= List of When Life Gives You Tangerines characters =

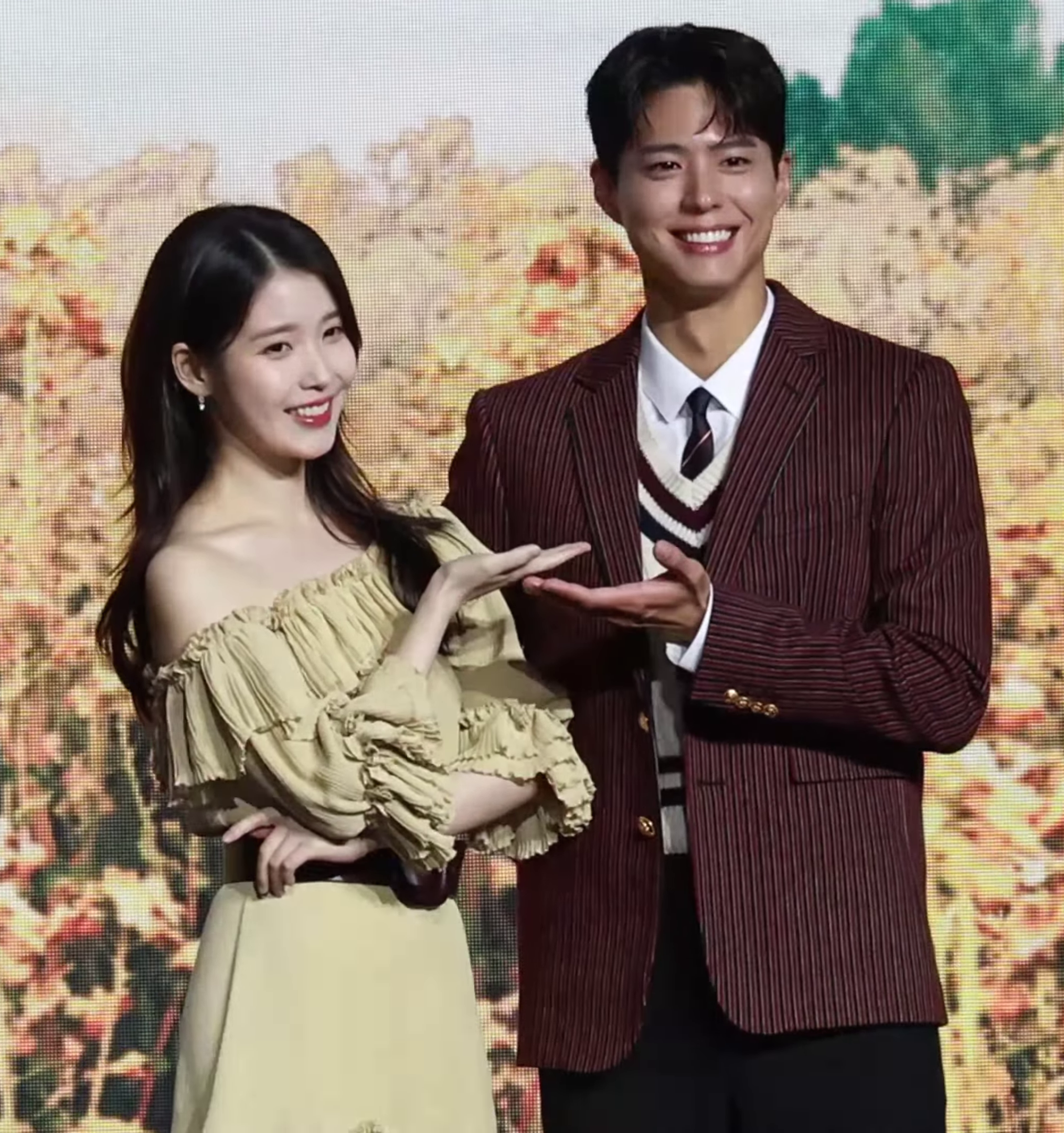
IU and Park Bo-gum portrayed the main characters Ae-sun and Gwan-sik respectively

This is a list of characters of the South Korean television series When Life Gives You Tangerines starring IU, Park Bo-gum, Moon So-ri, and Park Hae-joon. Netflix released the 16-episode series in four volumes, each with four episodes starting on March 7, 2025, through March 28, 2025. Bae Jong-byung, senior director of Netflix Korea's series division, explained: "We chose a release strategy that aligns with the creators' vision to maximize viewer enjoyment. From the beginning, the director and writer envisioned Tangerines as a story unfolding in four volumes, and we wanted viewers to experience it that way."

== Cast overview ==
List indicator

This section includes characters who will appear or have appeared in at least one act.

- A green cell indicates the actor is a main cast member.
- A red cell indicates the actor is a recurring cast member.
- A light blue cell indicates the actor is a guest or special guest cast member.

Character	Actor	Appearances			
Character	Actor	Volume I	Volume II	Volume III	Volume IV
Main characters
Oh Ae-sun	IU	Main	Main	Main	Main
Oh Ae-sun	Moon So-ri	Main	Main	Main	Main
Oh Ae-sun	Kim Tae-yeon	Recurring	Recurring	Recurring	
Oh Ae-sun	So-yeon	Recurring			
Yang Gwan-sik	Park Bo-gum	Main	Main	Main	Main
Yang Gwan-sik	Park Hae-joon	Main	Main	Main	Main
Yang Gwan-sik	Lee Cheon-mu	Recurring	Recurring	Recurring	
Yang Gwan-sik	Moon Woo-jin	Recurring			
Yang Geum-myeong	IU	Main	Main	Main	Main
Recurring characters
Park Mak-cheon	Kim Yong-rim	Recurring	Recurring	Recurring	
Kim Chun-ok	Na Moon-hee	Recurring	Recurring	Recurring	
Jeon Gwang-rye	Yeom Hye-ran	Recurring	Recurring	Recurring	
Kwon Gye-ok	Oh Min-ae	Recurring	Recurring	Recurring	Recurring
Bu Sang-gil	Choi Dae-hoon	Recurring	Recurring	Recurring	Recurring
Yeong-ran	Jang Hye-jin		Recurring	Recurring	Recurring
Yeong-ran	Chae Seo-an	Recurring	Recurring		
Park Chung-su	Cha Mi-kyung	Recurring	Recurring	Recurring	
Choi Yang-im	Lee Soo-mi	Recurring	Recurring	Recurring	Recurring
Hong Kyung-ja	Baek Ji-won	Recurring	Recurring	Recurring	Recurring
Oh Han-moo	Jung Hae-kyun	Recurring	Recurring	Recurring	
Park Yeong-bum	Lee Jun-young		Recurring	Recurring	Recurring
Yang Eun-myeong	Kang You-seok	Recurring	Recurring	Recurring	Recurring
Bu Hyeon-suk	Lee Soo-kyung		Recurring	Recurring	Recurring
Yoo Bu-young	Kang Myung-joo		Recurring	Recurring	
Song Bu-seon	Jung Yi-seo			Recurring	Recurring
Yang Gyeong-ok	Seo Hye-won	Recurring	Recurring	Recurring	Recurring
Guest characters
Yeom Byeong-cheol	Oh Jung-se	Special Guest			
Na Min-ok	Uhm Ji-won	Special Guest			
Park Chung-seop	Kim Seon-ho			Special Guest	Special Guest
Mi-sook	Lee Mi-do		Guest	Guest	Guest
Geum-ja	Kang Mal-geum	Guest			
Geum-ja's husband	Kim Young-woong	Guest			
Professor Jeon Ae-kyung	Kim Gook-hee		Guest		
Oh Jenny	Kim Su-an		Guest		
Kim Mi-hyang	Kim Geum-sun		Guest		
Oh Jenny's housekeeper	Nam Mi-jung		Guest		
Oh Jenny's driver	Kim Jae-young		Guest		
Kim Hae-bong	Kim Hae-gon			Guest	Guest
Song Young-Sam	Jeon Bae-soo			Guest	
Nurse	Lee Bong-ryun			Guest	
Jung Mi-in	Kim Sung-ryung			Guest	Guest
Jung Mi-in's manager	Hyun Bong-sik				Guest
Lee Hye-ran (Chloe H. Lee)	Yeom Hye-ran				Special Guest

== Family tree ==
Oh Ae-sun and Yang Gwan-shik family tree

Mr. Oh	Kim Chun-ok	Mr. Yang	Park Mak-cheon
Na Mi-ok	Yeom Byeong-cheol	Jeon Gwang-rye	Oh Han-gyu	Oh Han-moo	Hyeon Yi-sook	Yang Sam-bo	Kwon Gye-ok
Oh Ae-sun	Yang Gwan-sik	Oh Jong-go	Oh Jong-mi	Yang Gyeong-ok	Mr. Seo
Yeom Seon-nam
Yeom Seom-bom
Park Chung-seop	Yang Geum-myeong	Yang Eun-myeong	Bu Hyun-suk	Yang Dong-myeong	Seo Dong-min
Park Sae-bom	Yang Jae-il	Yang Yeong-won

== Main characters ==
=== Oh Ae-sun ===
Oh Ae-sun
- When Life Gives You Tangerines character
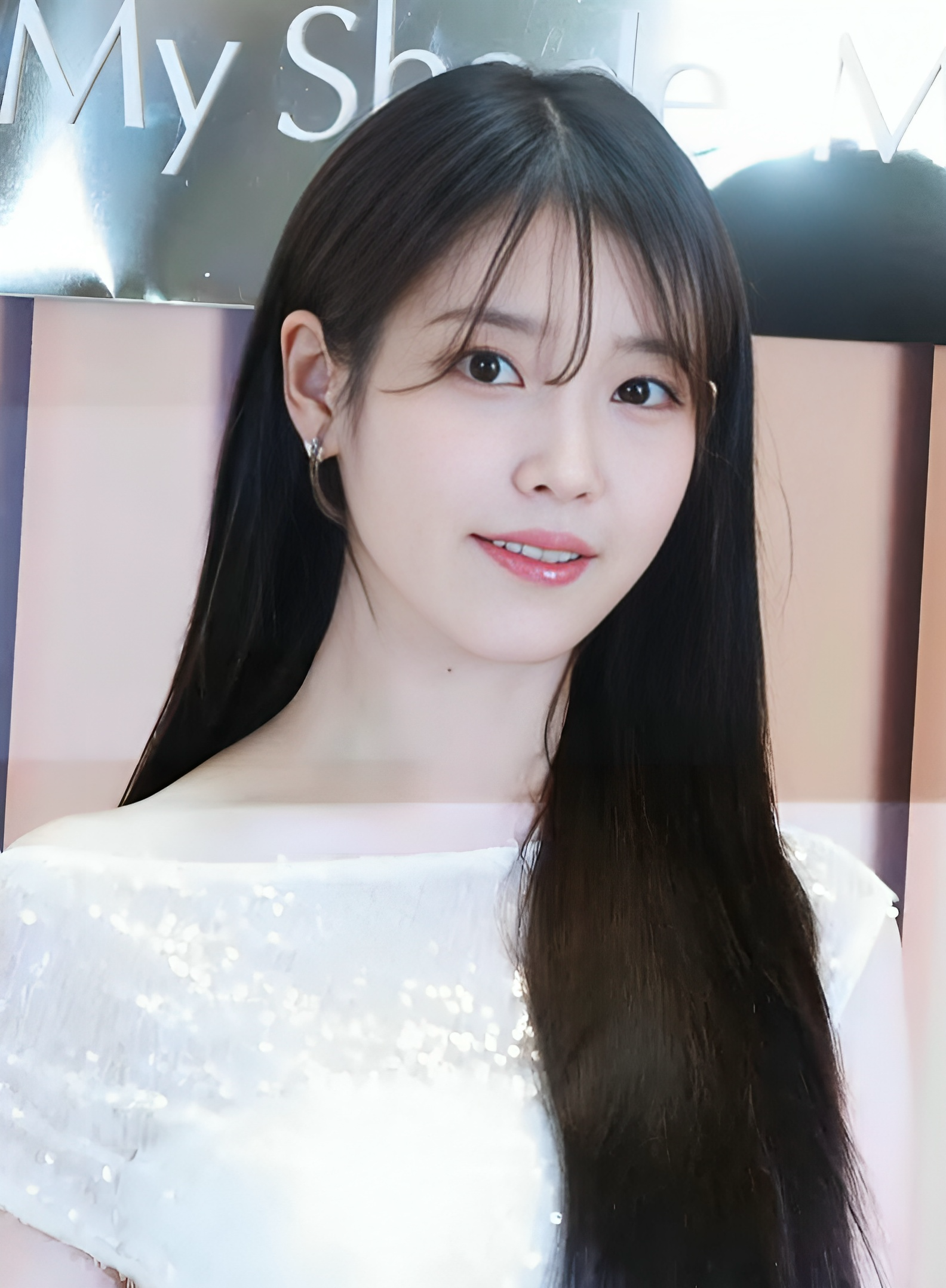
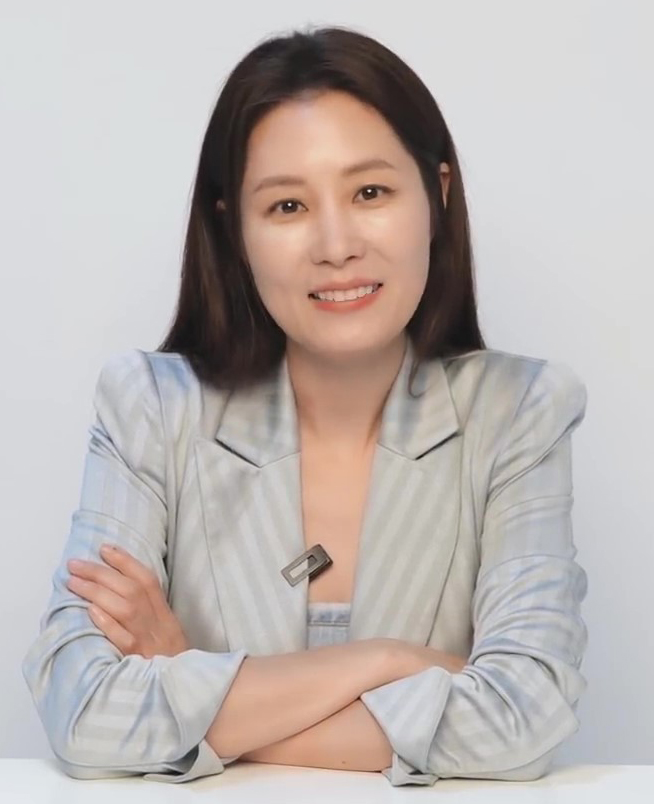
- IU (L) and Moon So-ri (R)
- Portrayed by: IU; Moon So-ri; Kim Tae-yeon; Seo-yeon
- First appearance: Episode 1
- Last appearance: Episode 16
- Created by: Lim Sang-choon
In-universe information
- Occupation: Housewife, poet
- Family: Yang
- Husband: Yang Gwan-sik
- Sons: Yang Eun-myeong; Yang Dong-myeong
- Daughters: Yang Geum-myeong

Oh Ae-sun (born in 1951) is the main protagonist of When Life Gives You Tangerines. Ae-sun was a small, timid literary girl who, despite needing to be resourceful in many ways, had a voice that trembled like a goat's whenever she rebelled. She was a child who had little but was not embittered. She is a resilient character like a wildflower tenaciously lifting its head toward the sun, even under the harsh shade of a wall that let in no sunlight. Even when circumstances prevented her from attending school, she dreamed of becoming a poet, unreservedly weeping when sad and laughing loudly enough to echo across the entire sea. She was assertive and capable.

Ae-sun's character is described as yo-mang-jin, a Jeju dialect term meaning "smart and clever." She is a lovable girl with infinite dreams and abilities, striving to get through life despite being frustrated by poverty and her gender. She possesses a girlish yet strong personality and maintains a beautifully positive outlook on life. Ae-sun's late mother, Gwang-rye, was a haenyeo—a female free diver who harvests seafood. Gwang-rye worked herself to death to ensure Ae-sun would never become a haenyeo and would be free to chase her dreams of becoming a poet.

Despite her intelligence and ambitions, Ae-sun was unable to graduate from high school or attend college on the mainland. She married her first love, childhood friend Yang Gwan-sik, and gave up her own dreams to become a mother at a young age, having her first child at 18.

Although Ae-sun escaped becoming a haenyeo, she did not become a writer or attend university. Instead, she became a housewife to a fisherman and repeated her mother cycle of sacrifice—working, cooking, and cleaning every day—in the hope that her daughter, Geum-myeong, would have opportunities she never enjoyed. She was deeply concerned about her ability to be a good mother, fearing she might fail to provide the love and care her child needed. This anxiety fueled her dedication to raising Geum-myeong with exceptional care, projecting her own hopes and insecurities onto her, making maternal love and commitment the core of her life. Ae-sun became furious and fought back when her in-laws tried to force Geum-myeong to become a haenyeo. Having lived a quiet life after marriage, this was her first act of rebellion, which resulted in her being slapped by her mother-in-law.

Ae-sun began publishing poetry in her 60s, with her poems appearing in magazines. In her 70s, she released a collection of poems titled You Have Done Well (폭싹 속았수다). After her husband's death, she volunteered teaching residents of a Jeju nursing home how to read, write, and express themselves through poetry. The residents called her "teacher," which brought her a sense of fulfillment. She lived in her renovated family home—originally her mother's—which had been sold to fund Geum-myeong's education but was later repurchased by Geum-myeong.

The character of Oh Ae-sun is portrayed by IU. Moon So-ri plays the middle-aged Ae-sun, Seo-yeon as teen Ae-sun and Kim Tae-yeon as child Ae-sun. IU and Kim Tae-yeon received praise for their performances in the drama, leading to IU's nomination for Best Actress – Television and Kim Tae-yeon's nomination for Best New Actress — Television at the 61st Baeksang Arts Awards. IU also considered for the Grand Prize. She also won for Best Actress in 2025 Blue Dragon Series Awards. IU ranked second place in Gallup Korea's Television Actor of the Year annual poll, after co-star Park Bo-gum (Gwan-sik).

=== Yang Gwan-sik ===
Yang Gwan-sik
- When Life Gives You Tangerines character
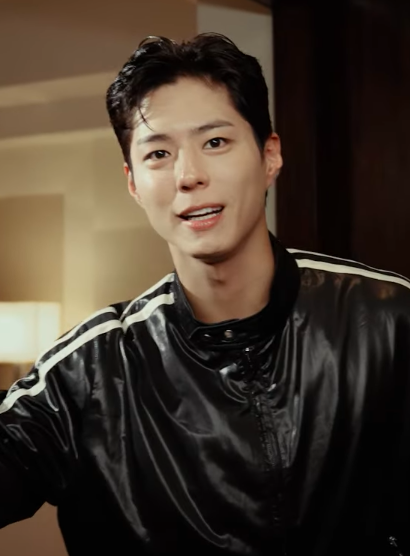
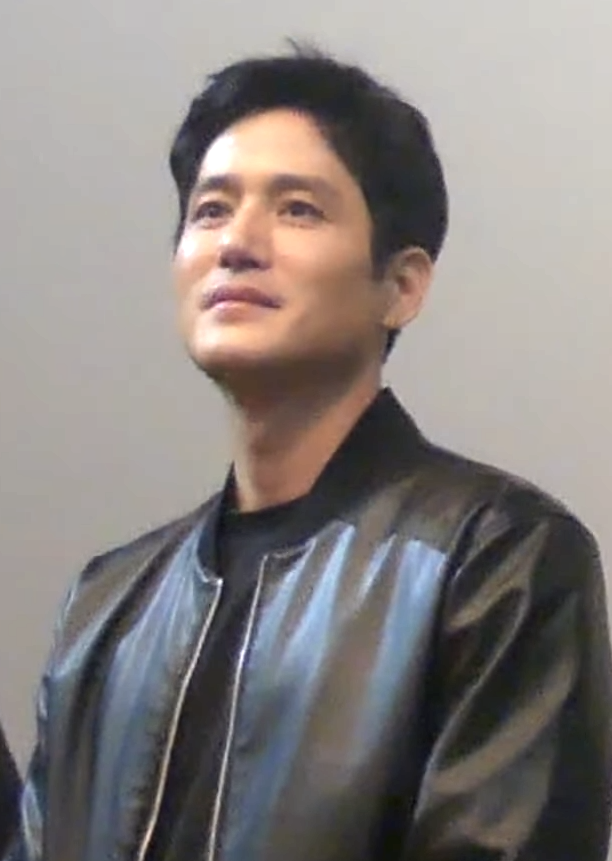
- Park Bo-gum (L) and Park Hae-joon (R)
- Portrayed by: Park Bo-gum; Park Hae-joon; Lee Cheon-mu; Moon Woo-jin
- First appearance: Episode 1
- Last appearance: Episode 16
- Created by: Lim Sang-choon
In-universe information
- Occupation: Fisherman; Restaurant owner
- Wife: Oh Ae-sun
- Sons: Yang Eun-myeong; Yang Dong-myeong
- Daughters: Yang Geum-myeong

Yang Gwan-sik (born 1950) is the main male character and Ae-sun's love interest, boyfriend, and later husband. He is described as "a character as silent and unyielding as cast iron and as unshakable as an old tree."

He understands the power of true dedication. However, in matters of love, he is as fragile as a ripe peach. Ae-sun's smile can make his heart falter, and her tears deeply affect him. Nevertheless, his loyalty remains unyielding. From the very beginning, he loves and cherishes Ae-sun alone, never wavering in his commitment. Using the circumstances of their era as a pretext, he guides Ae-sun through pivotal moments in her life—sometimes steering, pulling the emergency brake, or even stepping on the accelerator.

Gwan-sik has been by Ae-sun's side since their youth, always bringing fish from his own family's table to feed a neglected Ae-sun. He worked aboard a squid fishing boat under Captain Bu Sang-gil, where he endured verbal and physical abuse before quitting his job under Ae-sun's encouragement. Bu Sang-gil was the man Ae-sun had initially planned to marry and was known for his violent nature and frequent use of the word "hak."

Gwan-sik named his children Geum-myeong, Eun-myeong, and Dong-myeong. In English, geum translates to gold, eun to silver, and dong to bronze. Having given up a promising career as an athlete, his children became his greatest achievements. He later named his boat—bought for him by Ae-sun's grandmother—Geum Eun Dong as a tribute to his kids. Together, they lost a child but raised two to adulthood. They are grandparents and beloved members of the community, having done it all side by side. The character of Yang Gwan-sik is portrayed by Park Bo-gum. Park Hae-joon plays the middle-aged Gwan-sik, Lee Cheon-mu the child Gwan-sik, and Moon Woo-jin as teen Gwan-sik.

Park Bo-gum's portrayal received widespread praise by audience and critics domestically and internationally, earning him his second nomination for Best Actor – Television at the 61st Baeksang Arts Awards. He is also nominated for Best Actor in 2025 Blue Dragon Series Awards and won the Popularity Award. In addition, the role earned him two Grand Prizes (Daesang): Best Actor of the Year – OTT at the 10th Asia Artist Awards and Performer of the Year at the Fundex Awards. Park was named the 2025 Gallup Korea's Television Actor of the Year, his second time being selected. He is the first actor to top the poll for a streaming project.

=== Yang Geum-myeong ===
Yang Geum-myeong
- When Life Gives You Tangerines character
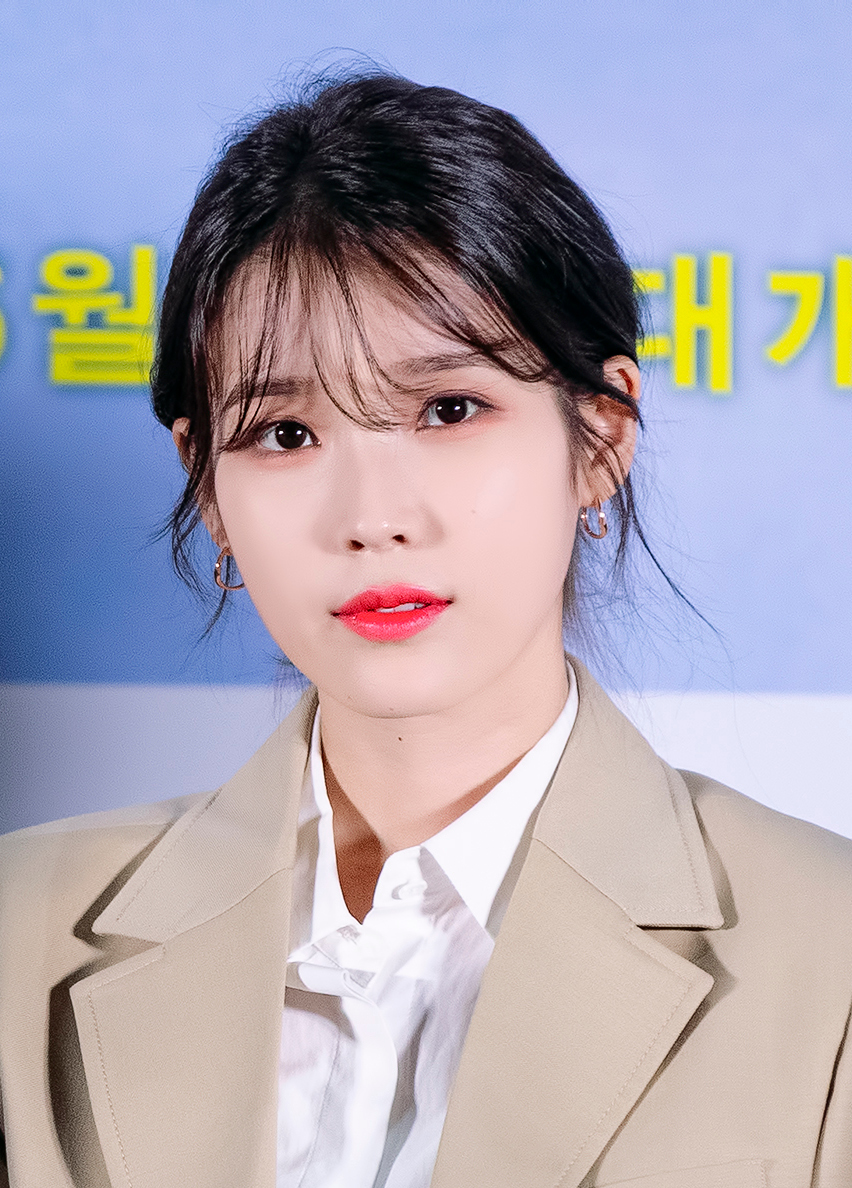
- Portrayed by: IU
- First appearance: Episode 2
- Last appearance: Episode 16
- Created by: Lim Sang-choon
In-universe information
- Occupation: Businesswoman
- Family: Park
- Father: Yang Gwan-sik
- Mother: Oh Ae-soon (mother)
- Brothers: Yang Eun-myeong; Yang Dong-myeong
- Husband: Park Chung-seop
- Daughters: Park Sae-bom

Yang Geum-myeong (born 1968) is the eldest and only daughter of Ae-sun and Gwan-sik, born when her parents were 18 and 19 years old, respectively. Her name, Geum-myeong, literally means "gold," symbolizing her status as her parents' "gold medal." She serves as the primary narrator of the series When Life Gives You Tangerines, with each episode structured around her reflections in her 50s. While Geum-myeong resembles her mother in appearance, her personality is distinct; she is often portrayed as speaking harshly to her affectionate parents. Her emotional struggles stem from the loss of her sibling, Dong-myeong, which left her with significant suppressed guilt. Throughout her youth, she found solace in academic achievement, viewed as a way to bring pride and joy to her family.

After enrolling at Seoul National University, Geum-myeong faced significant challenges, including the pressures of urban life and economic disparities with her romantic partner Park Young-beom. Her family made great sacrifices for her education; her parents even sold their house to send her on a student exchange programme to University of Tokyo in Tokyo, Japan. Upon returning to Korea, she lived in a rented room in Bongcheon-dong. An acquaintance, Park Chung-seop, recommended her for a part-time work at the Cannes Theatre. After graduation, she eventually secured employment at Daewoo and planned to marry her first love, Park Young-beom, the relationship ended due to opposition from his mother.

Geum-myeong lost her job during the 1997 Asian financial crisis. While job hunting, she attended a farewell screening at the closing Cannes Theatre, where she reconnected with an old friend, Park Chung-seop. The two married a year later and had a daughter, Sae-bom, in 2001. Geum-myeong later became a successful early tech entrepreneur. She launched an online lecture platform designed to make education accessible to individuals who, like her mother, were unable to attend college due to social or geographical barriers. Following her professional success, she purchased and renovated her grandmother's former home, which her parents had previously sold to fund her tuition.

The character was portrayed by IU as Yang Geum-myeong, Lee A-ra as child Geum-myeong (10–12 years old), Ahn Tae-rin as child Geum-myeong (7–10 years old), and Shin Chae-rin as child Geum-myeong (4–7 years old).

== Supporting characters: People from Jeju ==
=== Park Mak-cheon ===
Park Mak-cheon
- When Life Gives You Tangerines character
- Portrayed by: Kim Yong-rim
- First appearance: Episode 1
- Last appearance: Episode 12
In-universe information
- Occupation: shaman
- Family: Yang
- Sons: Yang Sam-bo
- Grandsons: Yang Gwan-sik

Park Mak-cheon is Gwan-sik's grandmother and a shaman. Due to her strong belief in superstitions, she dislikes Ae-sun, claiming that Ae-sun is possessed by the spirit of her deceased mother and is destined to die young. This leads to frequent conflicts between them. When Gwan-sik helps Ae-sun with her cabbage business at the market, Mak-cheon would come to overturn the cabbage cart and cause chaos.

Even after Gwan-sik and Ae-sun married, Mak-cheon threw red beans at Ae-sun daily to ward off bad luck. She also attempted to hold a ritual for Geum-myeong to become a haenyeo, which enraged Ae-sun, causing her to overturn the ritual table and move out.

Park Mak-cheon became kinder to Ae-sun after the birth of her son, Eun-myeong. After Ae-sun gave birth to their third child, a second son named Dong-myeong, Mak-cheon teased Gwon Gye-ok, Ae-sun's mother-in-law, by comparing Ae-sun favourably to her. When Dong-myeong went missing, Mak-cheon blamed herself for being unable to search for him due to her age. After Dong-myeong's death, she advised Eun-myeong to live as if he no longer had a birthday, emphasising the importance of behaving well for her mother's sake.

Park Mak-cheon died when Eun-myeong was in middle school, and she is depicted in a portrait in episode 12. The character is portrayed by Kim Yong-rim.

=== Kim Chun-ok ===
Kim Chun-ok
- When Life Gives You Tangerines character
- Portrayed by: Na Moon-hee
- First appearance: Episode 1
- Last appearance: Episode 12
In-universe information
- Occupation: housewife
- Family: Oh
- Sons: Oh Han-gyu; Oh Han-moo
- Grandsons: Oh Jong-gu
- Granddaughters: Oh Ae-sun

Kim Chun-ok is Ae-sun's paternal grandmother. Ae-sun is the only child of her eldest son, Oh Han-gyu. In her youth, Chun-ok sold gukbap (rice soup) on the mainland and fled to Jeju with her children during the Korean War.

Gwan-rye once asked her mother-in-law Chun-ok to accompany her to a photo studio for her mortuary portrait. Tearfully expressing her concerns about leaving Ae-sun behind in a world without her, Gwan-rye sought Chun-ok's support for her daughter. Chun-ok promised to honour Gwan-rye's wishes and, when Ae-sun was on the verge of giving up, her grandmother gave her money saved from selling gukbap and advised her to use it to buy a fishing boat.

Later in life, Chun-ok developed dementia and no longer recognised her children or other relatives. However, she immediately recognised her granddaughter Ae-sun, surprising everyone by saying, "Why don't I know? She's our Han-gyu's daughter." She showed concern for Ae-sun, asking, "Are you having a hard time? When did Kang-saeng, who lost his front teeth, grow this much? It must be hard, why aren't you feeling better? I know what's on your mind. I know everything." Ae-sun promised to get her new teeth after receiving her savings, but Chun-ok died on December 20, 1995, before that could happen. As both lost a son, they understand each other.

When Chun-ok died, in a dream-like sequence, Gwang-rye appears and asks, "How was your life? Was it like a picnic, or was it difficult?" Chun-ok responds, "It was like a picnic. It was a wonderful picnic where I saw all my children before departing." The song "Gwi-ro" by Jung Mi-jo plays softly in the background.

The character is portrayed by Na Moon-hee. Na Moon-hee with Yeom Hye-ran, Jung Hae-gyun, were all the writer's choices, as she had wanted them from the start.

=== Jeon Gwang-rye ===
Jeon Gwang-rye
- When Life Gives You Tangerines character
- Portrayed by: Yeom Hye-ran
- First appearance: Episode 1
- Last appearance: Episode 10
In-universe information
- Occupation: haenyeo
- Family: Yeom
- Spouse: Oh Han-gyu (late husband); Yeom Byeong-cheol (husband)
- Sons: Yeom Sun-bong
- Daughters: Oh Ae-sun; Yeom Sun-nam

Jeon Gwang-rye is Ae-sun's mother and a haenyeo (female diver). Born in 1932, she was a war orphan who faced numerous hardships before settling in Jeju at around 18 or 19 years old with her friend Kyung-ja. Gwang-rye lived a difficult life as a Jeju haenyeo to support her three children, but worsening diving sickness led to her premature death at the age of 29 in 1961.

Gwang-rye was married twice. She lost her first husband at sea and had Ae-sun with him. She had two more children with her second husband, Yeom Byeong-cheol, who was a loafer and rarely worked, causing financial strain. To make ends meet, Gwang-rye dove longer and deeper than others to catch one more abalone.

Ae-sun expressed her dissatisfaction with her mother by writing a poem titled "Gaejeombok", which have phrase, "I want to buy a day's fishing net with the money I earn by selling abalones." Gwang-rye, in an attempt to comfort herself, lit a cigarette but threw it into the fire pit after reading Ae-sun's words: "A diver who lives by breathing is going crazy if she smokes a cigarette because she wants to die." This made Gwang-rye cry, and she brought Ae-sun back home. Ae-sun was working as a maid at her uncle's house following her father's passing and her mother's absence.

Despite her often harsh demeanor, Gwang-rye loved her daughter deeply. Sensing her limited time, she asked her mother-in-law Chun-ok to accompany her to a photo studio, fearing to go alone. Among haenyeo, a photograph is considered a mortuary portrait symbolising one's impending death. Tearfully, Gwang-rye expressed her worries to Chun-ok about leaving Ae-sun behind, and asked her to support her daughter in times of struggle. Chun-ok's promise to honour these wishes. Gwang-rye became ill while Ae-sun was only ten. Ae-sun recalled her mother's words, "When the flower water fades, the living will come alive," while drinking balsam water. Gwang-rye roasted abalones over a bonfire, feeding them to Ae-sun and saying, "If you sell them, you will receive a hundred blessings, but if they enter a magpie's mouth, you will receive a thousand blessings," comforting her with, "Even if both parents die, the child will live." Gwang-rye died at 29, leaving Ae-sun and her two younger siblings behind.

The character of Jeon Gwang-rye was played by Yeom Hye-ran. Na Moon-hee, Yeom Hye-ran, and Jung Hae-gyun were all the writer's preferred choices, as she had envisioned them in the roles from the beginning. Yeom won the Best Supporting Actress award in the television category at the 61st Baeksang Arts Awards for her portrayal. She also won Best Supporting Actress in 2025 Blue Dragon Series Awards.

=== Kwon Gye-ok ===
Kwon Gye-ok
- When Life Gives You Tangerines character
- Portrayed by: Oh Min-ae
- First appearance: Episode 1
- Last appearance: Episode 16
- Created by: Lim Sang-choon
In-universe information
- Occupation: Housewife
- Family: Yang
- Husband: Yang Sam-bo
- Sons: Yang Gwan-sik

Kwon Gye-ok is the mother of Gwan-sik and mother-in-law of Ae-sun. She is a character who endures the hardships of her in-laws' life. Initially, Gye-ok does not strongly oppose Gwan-sik's relationship with Ae-sun, expressing only exasperation with the remark, "I should have raised a dog instead." However, she becomes angry and feels betrayed when Gwan-sik and Ae-sun run away to Busan. She attempts to persuade Ae-sun to stop the marriage but ultimately feels betrayed when they proceed.

Gye-ok's harsh treatment of Ae-sun after their marriage stems from her own loneliness and feelings of neglect. She was not recognised by her own mother-in-law and was ignored by her husband, so she expected compensation from her son. However, Gwan-sik neglected her, which increased her jealousy toward Ae-sun. She also tries to teach her granddaughter Geum-myeong the ways of a haenyeo, viewing it as early education rather than malice.

However, when Ae-sun is in distress due to the death of her youngest son Dong-myeong, she consoles Ae-sun with the line, "If you live, you will survive." In episode 7, frustrated with her grandson wandering around, Gye-ok drinks heavily. While drunk, she hugs her dog and calls him a filial son: "I did a good job raising him from the beginning. Oh my, let's go, filial son."

The role of Kwon Gye-ok is portrayed by Oh Min-ae.

=== Bu Sang-gil ===
Bu Sang-gil
- When Life Gives You Tangerines character
- Portrayed by: Choi Dae-hoon
- First appearance: Episode 3
- Last appearance: Episode 16
In-universe information
- Occupation: captain of the squid boat the vice-chief of Dodong-ri
- Family: Bu
- Spouse: Yeong-ran
- Sons: Bu Oh-seong; Bu Han-eum
- Daughters: Bu Hyeon-suk; Bu Jeong-suk

Bu Sang-gil is the main antagonist character in the drama. He is so rich that six out of ten Dodong-ri boats are his family's boats. He rules over the village with his money. He was former chief of Dodong-ri.

He has two sons from a previous marriage. He was once set to marry Ae-sun after a blind date, but Ae-sun, upset by Sang-gil's rude comments and still in love with Gwan-sik, ran away and married Gwan-sik instead. Later, he married Park Young-ran, with whom he has two daughters.

Sang-gil has a violent side and often displays abusive behavior toward his family. He is known for shouting "Hak! Ssi!" when in difficult situations, earning him the nickname "Hak Ssi Ahjusshi."

Sang-gil stands in stark contrast to Gwan-sik, epitomizing patriarchal masculinity. He fails to recognize Young-ran's accomplishments and seeks to dominate his wife through his financial influence and position of authority. Additionally, Sang-gil is unfaithful and has never participated in any of his children's school activities. As he reaches middle age, his family begins to turn against him, with even his children siding with Young-ran. Eventually, Young-ran divorces him. In his 60s, Sang-gil begins to show signs of positive change.

The role was portrayed by Choi Dae-hoon. His portrayal received critical acclaim, earning him his second nomination, and eventual win for Best Supporting Actor – Television at the 61st Baeksang Arts Awards. He is also nominated for Best Supporting Actor in 2025 Blue Dragon Series Awards.

=== Park Young-ran ===
Yeong-ran
- When Life Gives You Tangerines character
- Portrayed by: Jang Hye-jin; Chae Seo-an
- First appearance: Episode 4
- Last appearance: Episode 16
In-universe information
- Occupation: housewife real estate agent
- Family: Bu
- Spouse: Bu Sang-Gil
- Daughters: Bu Hyeon-suk; Bu Jeong-suk
- Stepsons: Bu Oh-seong; Bu Han-eum

Park Young-ran is the woman Bu Sang-gil married after his failed engagement to Ae-sun. Her husband, Sang-gil contrasts sharply with Gwan-sik, embodying patriarchal masculinity. He never acknowledges Young-ran's achievements and attempts to control her using his financial power and authority.

She took care of the children from his previous marriage despite enduring his infidelity and abuse. Her oldest stepson cannot tolerate his father's abusive treatment of her and supports her, wishing for her to divorce his father.

She shares a delicate and affectionate relationship with Ae-sun. Young-ran praises Ae-sun, saying, "You seem like a person who are treated preciously," and expresses to her daughter, Hyun-sook, urging her to grow up and marry a man like Ae-sun's loving husband, Gwan-sik.

After enduring over 30 years of abuse, Young-ran becomes emotionally detached. Later, after inheriting a tangerine orchard from her mother-in-law as a reward for her caregiving, she uses it as a stepping stone to pass the real estate exam around 2000. Ultimately, Young-ran divorces her husband.

The character is portrayed by Jang Hye-jin as middle-aged Yeong-ran and Chae Seo-an as younger Yeong-ran.

=== Park Chung-su ===
Park Chung-su
- When Life Gives You Tangerines character
- Portrayed by: Cha Mi-kyung
- First appearance: Episode 1
- Last appearance: Episode 12
In-universe information
- Occupation: haenyeo

Park Chung-su is Gwang-rye's haenyeo colleague and the eldest among them. She and the other haenyeo are like real aunts to Ae-sun, providing strong support throughout her life. When Ae-sun is bullied, they defend her vocally. In episode 3, when Gwan-sik jumped off the boat and swam across the sea toward Ae-sun, Park Chung-su scolded Gye-ok for trying to separate the two, saying, "What's wrong with the children's feelings?"

She later develops diving sickness (sumbyeong) and is the first of the three aunts to pass away. Out of habit, the remaining two aunts bring three spoons to the bibimbap bowl, evoking a poignant moment as they remember and miss Chung-su.

The character is portrayed by Cha Mi-kyung.

=== Choi Yang-im ===
Choi Yang-im
- When Life Gives You Tangerines character
- Portrayed by: Lee Soo-mi
- First appearance: Episode 1
- Last appearance: Episode 16
- Created by: Lim Sang-choon
In-universe information
- Occupation: haenyeo

Choi Yang-im is a native of Jeju and the best friend of Gwang-rye, one of the three haenyeo aunts. After Gwang-rye's death, she resolves to support Ae-sun, viewing their friendship as strong as a zelkova tree. Yang-im is always there for Ae-sun in difficult situations, providing warmth and support, and cherishes her like a niece. She defends Ae-sun from her grandmother-in-law Park Mak-cheon and mother-in-law Kwon Gye-ok, who often torment Ae-sun. Initially passive, Yang-im grows more assertive, particularly following the establishment of the Haenyeo Museum. As she ages, she becomes increasingly active in protecting the haenyeo and Jeju Island.

In episode 3, when Gwan-sik jumped off the boat and swam across the sea toward Ae-sun, she scolded Gye-ok for trying to separate them, saying, "The Cowherd and the Weaver Girl hit each other on the cheek."

The character is portrayed by Lee Soo-mi.

=== Hong Kyung-ja ===
Hong Kyung-ja
- When Life Gives You Tangerines character
- Portrayed by: Baek Ji-won
- First appearance: Episode 1
- Last appearance: Episode 16
In-universe information
- Occupation: haenyeo

Hong Kyung-ja was a war orphan who faced hardships before settling in Jeju at around 18 or 19 years old with her friend Gwang-rye. Together, they became haenyeo, with Hong Kyung-ja known as the most talkative among them. She has a gossipy nature and struggles to keep secrets. She often argued with Kwon Gye-ok when Gye-ok mistreated Ae-sun. On one occasion, she scolded Gye-ok for trying to separate Gwan-sik and Ae-sun, emphasising that some things are destined to happen: "Even the God above couldn't stop the day of the seventh lunar month, Chilseok."

Hong Kyung-ja, along with other haenyeo aunts and Ae-sun, sold snacks at a writing contest. She secretly submitted Ae-sun's poem, which unexpectedly won first prize, leading to an unforeseen turn of events. A photo of her with Yang-im at the Haenyeo Museum performance suggests that she is living a long life.

The character is portrayed by Baek Ji-won.

=== Oh Han-moo ===
Oh Han-moo
- When Life Gives You Tangerines character
- Portrayed by: Jung Hae-kyun
- First appearance: Episode 1
- Last appearance: Episode 13
In-universe information
- Occupation: housewife
- Family: Oh
- Sons: Oh Jong-gu

Oh Han-moo is Ae-sun's paternal uncle. Originally from a refugee family, he used to manage the Gyeonggi Trading Company in Gyeonggi Province. He neglected his niece Ae-sun, showing care primarily for his son Jong-gu. Despite this neglect, there was some affection for Ae-sun, as she was his niece. Living in a patriarchal society, Han-moo's attitude toward Ae-sun would likely have been different had she been a son. As head of the household, his actions were influenced by the prevailing social norms of the time.

Han-moo advised Ae-sun to give up college and work in a factory on the mainland, requesting that she send half of her monthly salary to him. In response, Ae-sun decided to steal jewelry and escape to Busan with Gwan-sik in the middle of the night.

Jung Hae-kyun was handpicked to be in the series by the mysterious star writer Lim Sang-chun, along with Na Moon-hee and Yeom Hye-ran.

=== Yeom Byeong-cheol ===
Yeom Byeong-cheol
- When Life Gives You Tangerines character
- Portrayed by: Oh Jung-se
- First appearance: Episode 2
- Last appearance: Episode 4
In-universe information
- Occupation: Fisherman
- Family: Yeom
- Spouse: Na Min-ok (wife)
- Sons: Yeom Sun-bong
- Daughters: Yeom Sun-nam
- Stepdaughters: Oh Ae-sun

Yeom Byeong-cheol is Ae-sun's stepfather. He married Ae-sun's widowed mother, Gwang-rye, and had a daughter and a son with her. Byeong-cheol is depicted as a man who relies on Gwang-rye for financial support and is often idle. However, he is not portrayed as entirely unkind, as he allowed Ae-sun, who was not his biological child, to live in his home.

Gwang-rye died at the age of 29 after falling ill from diving sickness when Ae-sun was 10 years old. To provide for his family, Byeong-cheol took a job on a deep-sea fishing boat and promised Ae-sun that he would send her to college. During her teenage years, Ae-sun cared and supported her younger siblings by farming and selling cabbages at the market. Byeong-cheol ensured she attended high school, though ultimately he failed to fulfill his promise of paying for her college education.

Seven years after Gwang-rye's death, Byeong-cheol remarried. His second wife, who was pregnant with his child before their marriage, gave birth to another child after they wed. While she accepted Byeong-cheol's two biological children from his previous marriage, she refused to accept Ae-sun, the daughter of his late first wife. As a result, she forced Ae-sun, still a minor, to leave the house.

The character is portrayed by Oh Jung-se.

=== Na Min-ok ===
Na Min-ok
- When Life Gives You Tangerines character
- Portrayed by: Uhm Ji-won
- First appearance: Episode 3
- Last appearance: Episode 4
In-universe information
- Occupation: housewife rice cake businessman
- Family: Yeom
- Spouse: Yeom Byeong-cheol (husband)
- Daughters: 1
- Stepsons: Yeom Sun-bong
- Stepdaughters: Oh Ae-sun; Yeom Sun-nam

Na Min-ok is Yeom Byeong-cheol's second wife. Seven years after Byeong-cheol's first wife, Gwang-rye, died, Min-ok became pregnant with Byeong-cheol's child out of wedlock and later married him as his second wife, giving birth to another child. Min-ok reluctantly accepted Byeong-cheol's two biological children from his previous marriage but struggled to accept Ae-sun, the child of his late wife. Ae-sun and Min-ok often clashed over minor issues and had a major disagreement when Min-ok wanted to remove a photo of Gwang-rye from the house. This conflict led Ae-sun to run away to Busan, taking some of Min-ok's clothing and jewelry. Despite their conflicts, Min-ok did not respond with anger but rather viewed Ae-sun's actions as romantic act. Min-ok sarcastically teased Gwan-sik's mother who came looking for Ae-sun to bring her back, saying, "Are you going to chase after her? You look just like a bounty hunter, very impressive."

Raising children on her own under difficult circumstances, makes Min-ok recognized Ae-sun's role in raising her half-siblings and felt a kinship with her, especially after Ae-sun had her own child, Geum-myeong. Min-ok showed her appreciation by giving Ae-sun gifts like a bicycle and clothes, saying, "Think of it as a moral scholarship." Saying, "I respect you. Living in this house, I've come to respect you. Your fate isn't as a maid; it's your character that resembles one." Before leaving Jeju, Min-ok even paid three months' rent for Ae-sun. The owner, a hard-of-hearing grandfather, misheard and wrote "Moral scholarship" as "Do Hee-jeong scholarship." Min-ok, fearing exposure of her Hangul illiteracy, pretended to understand and only checked that the numbers were correct.

Later, when Min-ok's rice cake business prospered, she gave a gold toad worth five don (a traditional unit of gold weight) as a gift at Ae-sun's grandson Jae-il's first birthday.

Na Min-ok is portrayed by Uhm Ji-won.

=== Yang Eun-myeong ===
Yang Eun-myeong
- When Life Gives You Tangerines character
- Portrayed by: Kang You-seok (teen to adult Choi Won (3 years ol); Lee Chae-hyun (4-7 years old); Lee Woo-seok (11 years old)
- First appearance: Episode 1
- Last appearance: Episode 16
In-universe information
- Occupation: businessman
- Family: Yang
- Father: Yang Gwan-sik
- Mother: Oh Ae-sun
- Brothers: Yang Dong-myeong
- Sisters: Yang Geum-myeong
- Spouse: Bu Hyeon-suk
- Sons: Yang Je-il
- Daughters: Yang Yeong-won

Yang Eun-myeong is the son of Ae-sun and Gwan-sik. His name, Eun-myeong, literally means "silver" in English, symbolizing that he is his parents' "silver medal."

Ae-sun was once called to school regarding Eun-myeong, expecting an important meeting but was disappointed to learn he had been causing trouble. Eun-myeong's high school homeroom teacher complained that he was the first student to steal car logos from teachers' cars and sell them. The teacher also listed other problems, such as making 11 bus passes out of 10 and earning 50 won per pass, gambling on small games like winning coins with panchi, and associating with bad friends. When the teacher mentioned Eun-myeong was dating a top female student, Ae-sun defended him, saying he didn't even play with his sister or cause trouble with women.

Among students, owning a car emblem letter matching their desired university's initial was believed to boost their chances of acceptance. In one scene, Geum-myeong is shown with a book binder adorned with an "S" emblem, possibly from Eun-myeong. This seemed to work, as she was admitted to Seoul National University, the top university in South Korea.

In Act 3, it is revealed that Eun-myeong's girlfriend is Bu Hyun-sook, daughter of Bu Sang-gil. She became pregnant in her early 20s while visiting Eun-myeong during his military service. Their baby was nicknamed Han-bang and later named Yang Jae-il. They had a shotgun wedding.

After Eun-myeong got married, he and his friend Chul-soo opened a pawnshop to make money. However, Chul-soo betrayed him by running away with the shop's money and assets, leading to Eun-myeong being wrongly accused of a crime and ending up in jail. While in jail, Eun-myeong's pent-up resentment towards his parents for always favoring his sister surfaced. Gwan-sik had to sell his boat to bail Eun-myeong out of jail. Eun-myeong resorted to selling rice cakes to survive, but when Gwan-sik discovered this, he helped Eun-myeong by secretly purchasing the rice cakes through Bu Sang-gil's acquaintances. Eun-myeong, upon learning of this, stopped selling the rice cakes. He attempted to leave by working on a deep-sea fishing boat, but Gwan-sik and Bu Sang-gil intervened to prevent him from leaving.

The character is portrayed by Kang You-seok, who portrays Eun-myeong from middle school to his 50s. The child actor progression is as follows: Choi Won at 3 years old, Lee Chae-hyun at 4–7 years old, and Lee Woo-seok at 11 years old. Kang is also nominated for Best New Actor in 2025 Blue Dragon Series Awards.

=== Bu Hyun-suk ===
Bu Hyun-suk
- When Life Gives You Tangerines character
- Portrayed by: Lee Soo-kyung
- First appearance: Episode 5
- Last appearance: Episode 16
In-universe information
- Occupation: businessman
- Family: Bu
- Father: Bu Sang-Gil
- Mother: Yeong-ran
- Sisters: Bu Jeong-suk
- Half-brothers: Bu Oh-seong; Bu Han-eum
- Spouse: Yang Eun-myeong
- Sons: Yang Je-il
- Daughters: Yang Yeong-won

Bu Hyeon-suk is the eldest daughter of Bu Sang-gil and Yeong-ran. Born in 1973, she fell in love with Yang Eun-myeong despite opposition from her family, so she was nicknamed Juliet of Dodong-ri.

She got pregnant in her early 20s while visiting Eun-myeong, who was in the military. Their baby was nicknamed Han-bang and later named Yang Jae-il. They had a shotgun wedding. She encountered disapproval from her father and half older brothers and eventually moved in with her in-laws.

When Eun-myeong faced false accusations, she asked Sang-gil for financial help to bail him out, but he refused. Comparing him unfavorably to Gwan-sik, she expressed envy towards her sister-in-law Geum-myeong for having a caring father. She is close to Gwan-sik, who secretly buys Hyeon-suk her favorite beer.

When Eun-myeong goes missing, she pleads with Sang-gil to find him. Eventually, Sang-gil and Gwan-sik locate Eun-myeong on a deep-sea fishing boat and bribe the captain to return him to port. She later discovers that Sang-gil has bribed a detective to prove Eun-myeong's innocence, leading to the investigation clearing her husband's name. Both events improve her relationship with her father.

Bu Hyeon-suk is portrayed by Lee Soo-kyung and as a child by Choi Ha-yoon.

=== Yang Dong-myeong ===
Yang Dong-myeong
- When Life Gives You Tangerines character
- Portrayed by: Shin Sae-byeok
- First appearance: Episode 5
- Last appearance: Episode 10
In-universe information
- Family: Yang
- Father: Yang Gwan-sik
- Mother: Oh Ae-sun
- Brothers: Yang Eun-myeong
- Sisters: Yang Geum-myeong

Yang Dong-myeong (Shin Sae-byeok) Ae-sun and Gwan-sik's youngest son. His name, Dong-myeong, literally means "bronze" in English, symbolizing that he is his parents' "bronze medal." Ae-sun loses Dong-myeong during a storm and he died.

=== Yang Sam-bo ===
Yang Sam-bo (Yoo Byung-hoon) is as Gwan-shik's father. He is the only child of Park Mak-cheon. He is a fisherman who own his fish shop in the market.

=== Hyeon Yi-sook ===
Hyeon Yi-sook (Oh Yeon-jae) as Han-moo's wife and Ae-sun's aunt. She and her husband were initially stingy with feeding young Ae-sun, but she dedicated her life to caring for her mother-in-law and performed ancestral rites for Ae-sun's father with devotion.

=== Yang Gyeong-ok ===
Yang Gyeong-ok (Seo Hye-won) is the only younger sister of Gwan-sik. Unlike Gwan-sik, she has a free-spirit personality. In second act, she tells Geum-myeong the secret of her birth while visiting their Jeju apartment. In the third act, she visits her sister in-law, middle-aged Ae-sun and forces her to buy a heated mat. In fourth act she attends Geum-myeong and Chung-seop's wedding.

=== Bu Seong-yi ===
Bu Seong-yi (Actor: Moon Yu-gang) is the eldest son of Bu Sang-gil and the stepson of Park Young-ran. He is the older brother of Bu Hyun-sook. Despite Park Young-ran not being his biological mother, Seong-yi expresses anger toward his father for harassing her while intoxicated. He asserts that he will live with Young-ran if she divorces Sang-gil. Additionally, he often nags his disoriented sister, Bu Hyun-sook, and is characterized as a strong son and a blunt, intimidating brother.

=== Ae-sun's homeroom teacher ===
Ae-sun's homeroom teacher, played by actor Hwang Jae-yeol, demotes her to vice president and instructs her to yield to a wealthier student despite her winning the class president election. He presents Ae-sun with her first injustice, emphasizing that background holds more weight than election results. His remarks, such as "37 votes are not important in social life," "The one who loses is the one who wins," and "If you come down on all fours, you will resign; for the greater good, you must yield," depict him as a symbol of power and corruption. This portrayal is strengthened by the props on his desk, including a newspaper and various books labeled "March 15th Election Fraud Mastermind."

Upon hearing that Ae-sun had lost the election to the military general's son, Gwang-rye decides to pay a visit to the homeroom teacher. Concerned about her daughter being mistreated, Gwang-rye shows her sincerity by gifting the teacher with an envelope containing expensive nylon socks and hidden 4,000 won. Given that the monthly salary of a civil servant in the early 1960s was between 3,000 and 4,000 won, this was a significant amount for Gwang-rye.

=== Harbang ===
Harbang, meaning grandfather in Jeju dialect (actor: Park Byung-ho), is Ae-sun and Gwan-sik's elderly landlord and co-owner of the Dodong-ri Manmul Center. He often grumbles as if scolding them but displays generosity by casually tossing an octopus to Ae-sun and Gwan-sik and reminding them to take care of the ancestral rites. His unique way of expressing affection includes giving them pork as a bonus when someone pays three months' rent for them. His famous line is, "You don't have to talk so much to understand."

=== Halmang ===
Halmang, meaning grandmother in Jeju dialect (actor: Song Kwang-ja), is Ae-sun and Gwan-sik's elderly landlady and co-owner of the Dodong-ri Manmul Center. She is deeply caring and demonstrates sensitivity, particularly when reminding her husband not to be too obvious in his actions, as it may annoy others. Her care is evident each night when she secretly refills Ae-sun's rice container—which often runs empty—with just enough rice for the family, creating a kind of 'goblin jar' magic. The grandmother's famous word is, "No one can live alone.".

=== Mi-sook ===
Mi-sook (Lee Mi-do) is the owner of a fortune-telling shop who first appears in episode 5. Caught dancing the so-called "social dance," she recovers quickly and declares, "Dance is a healthy sport." She later works as Bu Sang-gil's henchman. However, she also helps Ae-sun by informing her about Eun-myeong's boarding of a deep-sea fishing vessel. In middle age, when Ae-sun and Gwan-sik open a squid restaurant, Mi-sook opens a competing restaurant next door.

== Supporting characters: People from Seoul ==
=== Park Young-beom ===
Park Young-beom
- When Life Gives You Tangerines character
- Portrayed by: Lee Jun-young
- First appearance: Episode 6
- Last appearance: Episode 13
In-universe information
- Occupation: lawyer
- Family: Park
- Father: Park Geum-myeong
- Mother: Yoo Bu-young

Park Young-beom is Geum-myeong's first love. A graduate of Seoul National University Law School, he first met Geum-myeong at their college entrance ceremony. The two maintained an on-and-off relationship for seven years, which included periods of long-distance during his military service and a student exchange program in the United States.

Following their graduation, Park pressured Geum-myeong to marry him on several occasions, and the couple eventually became engaged. However, Geum-myeong terminated the engagement due to the behavior of Park's mother, who directed insults and cruelty toward both Geum-myeong and her parents. After a year of attempted reconciliations, the couple permanently separated on Park's birthday.

Park later entered into a marriage with an individual from a prestigious family. Despite his affluent background, he remained in an unhappy, loveless marriage and blamed his mother for his dissatisfaction. On the day of Geum-myeong's wedding to Chung-seop, Park secretly visited the venue and observed Geum-myeong in her wedding dress. After seeing her smiling and talking with a friend, he left, fulfilling a previous promise to see her as a bride. In the series, the character is portrayed by Lee Jun-young.

=== Yoon Boo-yong ===
Yoon Boo-yong
- When Life Gives You Tangerines character
- Portrayed by: Kang Myung-joo
- First appearance: Episode 4
- Last appearance: Episode 11
In-universe information
- Occupation: housewife
- Family: Park
- Spouse: Park Geum-myeong
- Sons: Park Young-beom

Yoon Boo-yong is the mother of Park Young-beom. She is characterized by a "twisted" form of maternal love, taking pride primarily in her son’s upbringing within their wealthy family. Consistently dissatisfied with Geum-myeong for failing to meet her social standards, she openly opposed her son’s relationship and their wedding preparations.

In the series, Boo-yong’s verbal abuse toward Geum-myeong reaches a peak when she discovers Geum-myeong at Young-beom’s house. During this confrontation, she insulted Geum-myeong’s parents and made disparaging remarks regarding their social standing, which ultimately prompted Geum-myeong to terminate the engagement. Following the breakup, Boo-yong arranged a marriage for her son with a woman from a prestigious family. However, this decision led to a deterioration of her relationship with Young-beom. In her later years, she faced mistreatment from her daughter-in-law and lived a life of loneliness and despair.

The character is portrayed by Kang Myung-joo. The drama served as her posthumous work; the actress passed away on February 28, 2025, at the age of 53 following a battle with cancer. As a tribute to Kang, who was Catholic, the production team incorporated funeral mass music into the fourth episode of the series.

=== Park Chung-seop ===
Park Chung-seop
- When Life Gives You Tangerines character
- Portrayed by: Kim Seon-ho
- First appearance: Episode 9
- Last appearance: Episode 16 (voice)
- Created by: Lim Sang-choon
In-universe information
- Other names: Park-casso, Park Toto
- Occupation: painter
- Family: Park
- Mother: Bun-hui
- Spouse: Yang Geum-myeong
- Daughters: Park Sae-bom

Park Chung-seop, affectionately nicknamed "Park-casso" and "Park Toto," is a film poster painter. He first crosses paths with Yang Geum-myeong in October 1990 when she rents a room from her partner's father. Despite both being in other relationships, the two form a connection through a series of small, kind gestures. Chung-seop helps Geum-myeong secure a job as a ticket seller, while Geum-myeong gifts a complimentary ticket to his mom.

Their relationship intensifies during a life-saving moment when Chung-seop rescues Geum-myeong from coal gas poisoning. He frequently walks her home, while carrying study materials for her. Before leaving for military service, he confesses his deep feelings, likening her to a sparkling Christmas tree. Leaving without saying goodbye, he left a portrait of her. In 1996, upon returning from service, he saw her in a departing bus, but failed to reconnect with her.

He eventually reunited her during 1997 Asian financial crisis after a determined bus chase through the streets following the Cannes Theater's final screening. They date shortly after and marries a year later in August. They welcomes their only daughter, Sae-bom, in 2001. Portrayed by Kim Seon-ho during the final acts of the story, the character received widespread critical and fan acclaim for the emotional depth brought to the performance.

=== Bun-hui ===
Bun-hui (Lee Ji-hyun) is a widow who operates a copy shop in the university district, is the mother of Park Chung-seop. She frequently attends movie premieres at the Cannes Theater to admire her son's film posters, initially unaware that Kim Hae-bong mistakes her for a scalper. After Geum-myeong provides her with a complimentary ticket, Bun-hui is able to watch Cinema Paradiso in a theater for the first time, an experience that moves her to tears. Remarking that the character Toto reminds her of her son, she shares a heartfelt moment of gratitude with Geum-myeong, telling her, "I think I will remember today even on the day I die." As a token of her appreciation, she gifts Geum-myeong English books and study materials from her shop, promising to support her until graduation and tasking her son with delivering the items.

=== Kim Hae-bong ===
Kim Hae-bong (played by Kim Hae-gon) is the president of the Cannes Theater. Although he often clashes with Chung-seop for prioritizing artistic integrity over the provocative posters the public demands for Madame Aema 4, he remains unable to fire him, despite his frustration over Chung-seop using others' money for his art. Beneath his gruff exterior, Kim is a soft hearted employer. Upon discovering that Chung-seop's mother is not a scalper but a proud parent visiting to admire her son's handiwork, he provides her with complimentary tickets under the guise of employee benefits while commending Chung-seop's talent.

Kim also plays matchmaker, encouraging a romance between Chung-seop and Geum-myeong. He facilitates their connection by having Geum-myeong deliver dumplings to Chung-seop. On the eve of final screening due to the theater's closure during the IMF crisis, Kim arranges for them to sit together. He even scolds Chung-seop for failing to capitalize on these moments. Kim later attends their wedding as a guest for the groom and becoming visibly emotional as the bride arrives.

=== Song Bu-seon ===
Song Bu-seon (Jung Yi-seo) is the daughter of a boarding house owner and Park Chung-seop's former girlfriend. Having dropped out of high school, she and Chung-seop often quarreled, fueled by his financial instability and her parents' disapproval of their relationship. Following a confrontation at the Cannes Theater where she mistakenly assumes Chung-seop and Geum-myeong are romantically involved, she begins acting out of jealousy by kicking Geum-myeong's shoes. Although she receives a marriage proposal from the son of the "Pil-dong Guksu" family, she struggles to move on from Chung-seop; she eventually marries the Guksu heir nonetheless. She is known as Natasha, a nickname derived from a poem in a collection owned by Chung-seop. In a lighthearted moment after their marriage, Geum-myeong teases Chung-seop about an appearance Bu-seon makes in a commercial, prompting a humorous exchange between them.

=== Song Young-sam ===
Song Young-sam (Jeon Bae-soo) is the owner of the boarding house where Geum-myeong stays after studying in Japan. He worked at a factory and has a daughter, Song Bu-seon, and a young son. When Geum-myeong moved in as a boarder, he initially refused her request to fix the doorknob and warned her that if she brought in a boyfriend, he would take eviction measures, stating that she was like a daughter to him. One day, he arrived just in time to catch Park Chung-seop.

=== Jeon Ae-kyung ===
Professor Jeon Ae-kyung, played by Kim Gook-hee, is a professor of English Literature at Seoul National University. She offered to send Geum-myeong to study in Japan with her own funds instead of government sponsorship, but she declined. Ye-rim feels Geum-myeong missed an opportunity and should have accepted the offer, but Geum-myeong chose to study abroad with money from her own parent. Professor Jeon has a habit of leaving apple slices on a window sill for birds to eat.

=== Min-seon ===
Min-seon, played by Kim Su-yeon, is Geum-myeong's best friend and a member of the same college film club. When Oh Ye-rim belittles Geum-myeong, Min-seon defends her by pointing out that Geum-myeong excels in both grades and height. She also mentions that Oh Ye-rim wouldn't have been able to study in Japan if Geum-myeong hadn't given up her spot. However, when Oh Ye-rim boasts about her victory, Min-seon sarcastically remarks that life is all about the total score and compliments her on her dignity before ending the conversation. Min-seon is a close friend of Geum-myeong, often visiting her at home and providing support after Geum-myeong ends her engagement with Young-beom. She serves as a bridesmaid at Geum-myeong's wedding.

=== Oh Ye-rim ===
Oh Ye-rim (Pyo Young-seo) is a member of the same college film club as Geum-myeong's college classmate. Oh Ye-rim, who comes from a wealthy and privileged family, contrasts with Geum-myeong's struggles to balance studies, part-time jobs, and dorm life. She subtly belittles Geum-myeong, flaunting her family's support and making snide remarks. However, she actually feels intellectually inferior to Geum-myeong.

=== Jo-kyung ===
Jo-kyung (Kim Gye-rim) is Geum-myeong's friend and a member of the same college film club. She is often caught disliking Geum-myeong or badmouthing her. However, she seems to have maintained a friendship with Geum-myeong and Min-seon even after graduating from college. She serves as a photographer at Geum-myeong's wedding.

=== Oh Jenny ===
Oh Jenny (Kim Su-an) was born on August 7, 1969. She is in Class 2, Number 27 of the 3rd grade at Seonhwa Girls' High School. Jenny is a student whom Geum-myeong tutors, and her nickname is Oh-jaemi. She uses an English name, but she struggles with writing Wednesday in English. Jenny is a typical rebellious high school girl who dreams of becoming a singer and enjoys dancing, singing, and playing rather than studying. She is a fan of singer Kim Seung-jin, and her room is covered with Kim Seung-jin's photos. Geum-myeong is well aware of Jenny's inclinations and advises her mother, Mi-hyang, to let Jenny pursue a career in what she is good at, rather than pushing her to attend a prestigious university through a proxy college scholastic ability test.

=== Kim Mi-hyang ===
Kim Mi-hyang (Kim Geum-sun) is Jenny's mother. She is a nouveau riche from a hostess background. She is aware of her daughter's lack of intelligence and asks Geum-myeong to take the college scholastic ability test for Jenny in exchange for buying her an apartment in Seoul. When Geum-myeong refuses, she retaliates by framing her as a ring thief to prevent her from leaking the information. However, she later clears Geum-myeong of the theft charge after her housekeeper threatens her with holding a diamond ring hostage. Despite receiving advice from both Geum-myeong and the housekeeper to live a life of accumulating good deeds and letting Jenny pursue what she is good at, she still decides to take the proxy exam for Jenny. This decision leads to her being caught and appearing on the front page of the newspaper. She instilled in her daughter the belief that she would be abandoned once the "sweet water" was gone, and true to her words, Jenny testifies that "Mom made me do it all" when the crime is discovered.

=== Oh Jenny's housekeeper ===
Jenny's Housekeeper (Nam Mi-jung). In episode 8, when Geum-myeong is falsely accused of stealing a diamond ring by the student's mother she tutors and is arrested by the police, she uses her wit to help her get released. Mi-hyang cannot bring herself to fire the housekeeper because of their relationship from her days as a hostess, and she drinks with her and asks why she helped her. The housekeeper says that Geum-myeong looks exactly like someone. As it turns out, when the housekeeper was staying at an inn in Busan when she was young, it was Gwan-shik and Ae-sun who told her that the owners were swindlers. Thanks to the two, the housekeeper was able to protect her mother's inheritance, and afterwards, she bought them tofu. Although decades have passed, she has not forgotten what happened at that time, and she noticed that Geum-myeong looked exactly like Ae-sun and helped her.

== Supporting characters: People from Busan ==
=== Geum-ja ===
Geum-ja (played by Kang Mal-geum) is the female owner of the Nampo-jang motel in Busan, where Ae-sun and Gwan-shik stay after running away. She is a swindler and thief who serves strong alcohol to guests and secretly steals their belongings when they fall asleep. Geum-ja steals Ae-sun and Gwan-shik's valuables bag, but when Ae-sun sneaks in to retrieve it and sees Hye-sook sleeping with her hairpin in her hair, she attempts to pull it out. Hye-sook wakes up, screams, and Geum-ja is caught, tying up Ae-sun in the process. Ae-sun headbutts her, allowing them to escape. Later, when Gye-ok arrives to stage a protest, Geum-ja becomes frustrated. She is eventually arrested for fraud and is revealed by the police to be a notorious criminal with more than ten previous convictions.

=== Park Bong-nam ===
Park Bong-nam (played by Kim Young-woong) is the male owner of the inn where Ae-sun and Gwan-shik stay after running away to Busan. When the innkeepers steal Ae-sun and Gwan-shik's bag and deny any knowledge, Park Bong-nam becomes angry and kicks them out, demanding evidence. However, when Ae-sun and Gwan-shik return to retrieve the bag and are caught, Park grabs Ae-sun and threatens her. This provokes Gwan-shik to become angry, kick a wall, and deliver a flying kick. Later, after his wife is reported and imprisoned, and following persistent demands from Gye-ok, Park finally returns the stolen valuables.

=== Gold Shop Owner ===
Goldsmith (played by Shin Mi-young) owns "Nampo-dang," a goldsmith shop in Busan visited by Ae-sun and Gwan-shik to sell their valuables. She immediately recognises them as runaway teenagers and initially regards them unfavorably. However, when the innkeeper attempts to steal and sell Ae-sun and Gwan-shik's valuables, the shop owner identifies the items as stolen goods and reports them to the police, aiding in their arrest. She also fulfils Gwan-shik's request by making a wedding ring, demonstrating genuine Busan generosity.

== Supporting characters: other ==
=== Jung Mi-in ===
Jung Mi-in (Actor: Kim Sung-ryung) is a top actress. She attempts to take her own life by jumping into the sea from a fishing boat following a scandal but is rescued by Yang Gwan-sik. She later bounces back in her career, winning a Baeksang Award for her role as a fisherman's she strives to repay her debts and ultimately becomes Yang Gwan-sik's savior after he experiences a significant mishap. Yang Gwan-sik, having purchased a small store in a desolate area, opens a squid and seafood restaurant named "Geum-eun-dong." Unfortunately, he faces financial troubles due to a lack of customers. Jung Mi-in visits the restaurant to film a broadcast, where she enjoys squid soup and humorously uses the catchphrase "Buy soup~ soup~ soup," a playful nod to Jang Mi-hee's catchphrase from the 1998 drama Six Siblings. Following her visit, the restaurant sees a surge in popularity, described as a 'jackpot,' with customers flocking in.

=== Hyun-ja ===
Hyun-ja (Actor: Lee Ji-hyun) is a kidnapper who appears in childhood flashbacks of middle-aged Ae-sun. In these flashbacks, she asks young Ae-sun, who is returning home, to pretend to have an injured leg and attempts to kidnap her by putting her in a truck with an accomplice.
