= When Life Gives You Tangerines =

2025 South Korean television series

- Promotional poster
- Hangul: 폭싹 속았수다
- Lit.: Thank You for Your Hard Work (Note: Could be mistaken for the standard Korean translation for 'Heavily Fooled')
- RR: Pokssak sogatsuda
- MR: P'okssak sogassuda
- Genre: Romance; Slice-of-life
- Written by: Lim Sang-choon
- Directed by: Kim Won-seok
- Starring: IU; Park Bo-gum; Moon So-ri; Park Hae-joon
- Music by: Park Sung-il
- Opening theme: "Spring" by Kim Jung-mi
- Country of origin: South Korea
- Original languages: Korean; Jeju Language
- No. of episodes: 16

Production
- Executive producer: Park Sang-hyun
- Producers: Hong Soo-hwan; Jeon Soo-jung
- Cinematography: Choi Yoon-man; Kim Dong-soo
- Editor: Kim Jin-oh
- Running time: 49–85 minutes
- Production companies: Pan Entertainment; Baram Pictures
- Budget: ₩60 billion

Original release
- Network: Netflix
- Release: March 7 – March 28, 2025

When Life Gives You Tangerines (Korean: 폭싹 속았수다; RR: Pokssak sogatsuda; Jeju for 'Thank You for Your Hard Work') is a 2025 South Korean romance slice-of-life television series written by Lim Sang-choon, directed by Kim Won-seok, and starring IU, Park Bo-gum, Moon So-ri, and Park Hae-joon. It was released on Netflix every Friday, from March 7, 2025, to March 28, 2025.

The series received widespread praise for its performances, screenplay, and direction. Among its numerous accolades, the series received a total of eight nominations at the 61st Baeksang Arts Awards, winning four, including Best Drama. It was also named by Time magazine as the best Korean drama of 2025. The series has been favorably compared to the acclaimed series Reply 1988 (2015–2016), also starring Park Bo-gum, for eliciting nostalgia and warmth rooted in the Korean experience.

== Synopsis ==
The drama follows the adventurous life and many trials of Ae-sun (IU), a poor girl wanting to become a poet who was born in Jeju in 1951, and Gwan-sik (Park Bo-gum), a young man who cherishes and loves her. The drama is narrated by their daughter, Yang Geum-myeong.

== Cast and characters ==
=== Main ===
- IU as Oh Ae-sun, the main female character and Gwan-sik's love interest, girlfriend and later wife, and as Yang Geum-myeong, the eldest child and only daughter of Ae-sun and Gwan-sik.

- Moon So-ri as middle age Ae-sun
- Yoon Seo-yeon as teen Ae-sun
- Kim Tae-yeon as child Ae-sun
- Shin Chae-rin as child Yang Geum-myeong (4–7 years old)
- Ahn Tae-rin as child Yang Geum-myeong (7–10 years old)
- Lee A-ra as child Yang Geum-myeong (10–12 years old)

- Park Bo-gum as Yang Gwan-sik, the main male character and Ae-sun's love interest, boyfriend and later husband.

- Park Hae-joon as middle age Gwan-sik
- Lee Cheon-mu as child Gwan-sik
- Moon Woo-jin as teen Gwan-sik

=== Supporting ===
- Kim Yong-rim as Park Mak-cheon Gwan-sik's grandmother who is a shaman
- Na Moon-hee as Kim Chun-ok, Ae-sun's paternal grandmother
- Yeom Hye-ran as Jeon Gwang-rye, Ae-sun's mother who is a haenyeo, and as chief editor Chloe H. Lee in a brief cameo appearance in episode 16
- Oh Min-ae as Kwon Gye-ok, Gwan-sik's mother
- Cha Mi-kyung as Park Chung-su, a haenyeo
- Lee Soo-mi as Choi Yang-im, a haenyeo
- Baek Ji-won as Hong Kyung-ja, a haenyeo
- Jung Hae-kyun as Oh Han-moo, Ae-sun's paternal uncle
- Choi Dae-hoon as Bu Sang-gil, a rich fishing captain
- Kang You-seok as Yang Eun-myeong, Ae-sun and Gwan-sik's son
- Oh Yeon-jae as Hyeon Yi-sook, Han-moo's wife and Ae-sun's aunt
- Yoo Byung-hoon as Yang Sam-bo, Gwan-sik's father
- Shin Sae-byeok as Yang Dong-myeong, Ae-sun and Gwan-sik's son
- Jang Hye-jin as Yeong-ran, Bu Sang-gil's wife

- Chae Seo-an as younger Yeong-ran

- Lee Soo-kyung as Bu Hyeon-suk, Sang-gil and Yeong-ran's daughter
- Moon Yu-gang as Bu Seong-yi, Bu Sang-gil's eldest son
- Seo Hye-won as Yang Gyeong-ok, Gwan-sik's sister
- Jung Yi-seo as Song Bu-seon, Chung-seop's girlfriend
- Lee Jun-young as Park Yeong-bum, Geum-myeong's first love
- Kang Myung-joo as Yoo Bu-young, Park Yeong-bum's mother
- Lee Gyu-hoe as Park Geum-myeong, Park Yeong-bum's father
- Lee Ji-hyun as Bun-hui, Chung-seop's mother
- Park Byung-ho as Harbang, Ae-sun and Gwan-sik's elderly landlord, co-owner of Dodong-ri Manmul Center
- Song Kwang-ja as Halmang, Ae-sun and Gwan-sik's elderly landlady, co-owner of Dodong-ri Manmul Center
- Hwang Jae-yeol as Ae-sun's school teacher
- Kim So-yeon as Min-seon, Geum-myeong's friend in the film club
- Kim Gye-rim as Ju-kyung, Geum-myeong's friend in the film club
- Pyo Young-seo as Oh Ye-rim, Geum-myeong's friend in the film club

=== Guest appearances ===
- Oh Jung-se as Yeom Byeong-cheol, Ae-sun's stepfather
- Uhm Ji-won as Na Min-ok, Byeong-cheol's second wife
- Lee Mi-do as Mi-sook, owner of a fortune teller shop
- Kim Seon-ho as Park Chung-seop, Geum-myeong's husband
- Kim Hae-gon as Kim Hae-bong, CEO of the Cannes Theater
- Kang Mal-geum as Geumja, Nampojang motel co-owner
- Kim Young-woong as Geumja's husband, Nampojang motel co-owner
- Kim Gook-hee as Jeon Ae-kyung, Geum-myeong's professor at Seoul National University
- Kim Su-an as Oh Jenny, Geum-myeong's tutee
- Kim Jae-young as Jenny's chauffeur
- Kim Geum-soon as Mi-hyang
- Nam Mi-jung as Mi-hyang's housekeeper
- Jeon Bae-soo as Song Yeong-sam, Geum-myeong's boarding house owner
- Kim Sung-ryung as Jeong Mi-in, an actress
- Lee Bong-ryun as a nurse
- Hyun Bong-sik as Mi-in's manager
- Kim Kang-hoon as Yang Je-il, Eun-myeong's and Hyeon-suk's eldest son / Ae-sun and Gwan-sik's grandson

== Episodes ==
Presented in a non-linear narrative, the story follows the lives of Ae-sun, Gwan-sik, and their children split between Dodong-ri in Jeju Island and Seoul between the 1950s and the 2000s. Events shown previously are sometimes shown again in later episodes with greater context to show the connection between different events and characters. Narration within episodes is often given by an older Geum-myeong, poetically reminiscing about her feelings on events of the past.

No.	Title	Directed by	Written by	Original release date
Volume I
1	"Spring in a Heartbeat"; Transliteration: "Hororong bom" (Korean: 호로록 봄)	Kim Won-seok	Lim Sang-choon	March 7, 2025
2	"Sassy First Love"; Transliteration: "Yomangjin cheotsarang" (Korean: 요망진 첫사랑)	Kim Won-seok	Lim Sang-choon	March 7, 2025
3	"Yesterday Was Your Spring"; Transliteration: "Yeseuteodei. "geudeurui bomeun..."" (Korean: 예스터데이. "그들의 봄은...")	Kim Won-seok	Lim Sang-choon	March 7, 2025
4	"The Blazing Summer Sunshine"; Transliteration: "Kkwarangkkwarang yeoreum" (Korean: 꽈랑꽈랑 여름)	Kim Won-seok	Lim Sang-choon	March 7, 2025
Volume II
5	"A Midsummer Night's Full Nets"; Transliteration: "Hanyeoreum bamui manseon" (Korean: 한여름 밤의 만선)	Kim Won-seok	Lim Sang-choon	March 14, 2025
6	"Life Goes On and On"; Transliteration: "Salmin sarajinda" (Korean: 살민 살아진다)	Kim Won-seok	Lim Sang-choon	March 14, 2025
7	"A Fruitful Fall"; Transliteration: "Jarakjarang gaeul" (Korean: 자락자락 가을)	Kim Won-seok	Lim Sang-choon	March 14, 2025
8	"The Moon Wanes, Yet the Young Heart Remains"; Transliteration: "Byeonhaneuni dariyo, maeumiya neukgenneunga" (Korean: 변하느니 달이요, 마음이야 늙겠는가)	Kim Won-seok	Lim Sang-choon	March 14, 2025
Volume III
9	"The Wind Goes Whoosh, My Heart Goes Boo-Hoo"; Transliteration: "Barameun waengwaengwaeng, maeumeun inginging" (Korean: 바람은 왱왱왱 마음은 잉잉잉)	Kim Won-seok	Lim Sang-choon	March 21, 2025
10	"The Storm Sweeps My Heart, the Love Rocks My Heart"; Transliteration: "Pum ane baram, pum ane sarang" (Korean: 품 안의 바람 품 안의 사랑)	Kim Won-seok	Lim Sang-choon	March 21, 2025
11	"My Love by My Side"; Transliteration: "Nae sarang nae gyeote" (Korean: 내 사랑 내 곁에)	Kim Won-seok	Lim Sang-choon	March 21, 2025
12	"A Glistening Winter"; Transliteration: "Pellong pellong gyeoul" (Korean: 펠롱펠롱 겨울)	Kim Won-seok	Lim Sang-choon	March 21, 2025
Volume IV
13	"Such an Uneven Love"; Transliteration: "Geuchuruk jjaksarang" (Korean: 그추룩 짝사랑)	Kim Won-seok	Lim Sang-choon	March 28, 2025
14	"Spread Your Wings and Fly"; Transliteration: "Hwolhwol nalla, hwolhwol nara bokyeo" (Korean: 훨훨 날라, 훨훨 날아 보켜)	Kim Won-seok	Lim Sang-choon	March 28, 2025
15	"A Spring Every Day"; Transliteration: "Mannal, bom" (Korean: 만날, 봄)	Kim Won-seok	Lim Sang-choon	March 28, 2025
16	"Here's to All You've Been Through"; Transliteration: "Pokssak sogatsuda" (Korean: 폭싹 속았수다)	Kim Won-seok	Lim Sang-choon	March 28, 2025

== Production ==
=== Development ===
The series was developed under the working title Insaeng (인생; 'Life'). The series was produced by Pan Entertainment and was helmed by director Kim Won-seok, and the script was penned by Lim Sang-choon, marking her return after writing the 2019 KBS drama When the Camellia Blooms. In December 2022, production designer Ryu Seong-hie acknowledged her involvement in the project. The production cost is reported to be around ₩60 billion.

The official Korean title Pokssak Sogatsuda (폭싹 속았수다) was revealed on January 27, 2023. The title is a Jeju language verb for "thank you for your hard work". In Jeju language, sokda (속다), which forms a part of sogatsuda (속았수다), means "trying hard", "taking the trouble" or "having a hard time". Coincidentally, sokda is a linguistic false friend to the standard Korean word for "be deceived", "be cheated" or "be fooled", so Pokssak sogatsuda could be misinterpreted as the standard Korean translation for "heavily fooled".

The official English title, When Life Gives You Tangerines, was announced on January 30, 2023, and is a word play on the proverb "When life gives you lemons, make lemonade"; the fruit that grows in Jeju Island is mandarin orange, however. The Chinese title, Kǔjìngānlái Yùjiànnǐ (Chinese: 苦盡柑來遇見你; lit. 'I finally get to meet you after enduring hardship'), similarly plays on the Chinese proverb Kǔjìngānlái (苦盡甘來; 'After the bitterness comes sweetness'); here, the Chinese character for either "mandarin orange" or "tangerine" (柑; gān) replaces similarly sounded character for "sweetness" (甘; gān) in the original proverb. A representative for Netflix's Globalisation Team stated that "When giving a title in English, the goal is to localize the creator's intention and cultural nuance in the original title to suit the culture of English-speaking countries".

=== Filming ===
Aside from filming in Jeju, the production also filmed in Andong in 2023.

In 2023, the series faced controversy over nuisance filming. A visitor to the Gochang Academy Farm Green Barley Field Festival reported being restricted from entering a rapeseed flower field due to ongoing filming. When the visitor attempted to photograph the flowers from a distance, a staff member reportedly shouted at them to stop taking pictures. Allegations of bullying by staff members toward extras surfaced in May 2025. In response, Netflix stated that it was investigating the allegations.

=== Casting ===
Principal cast

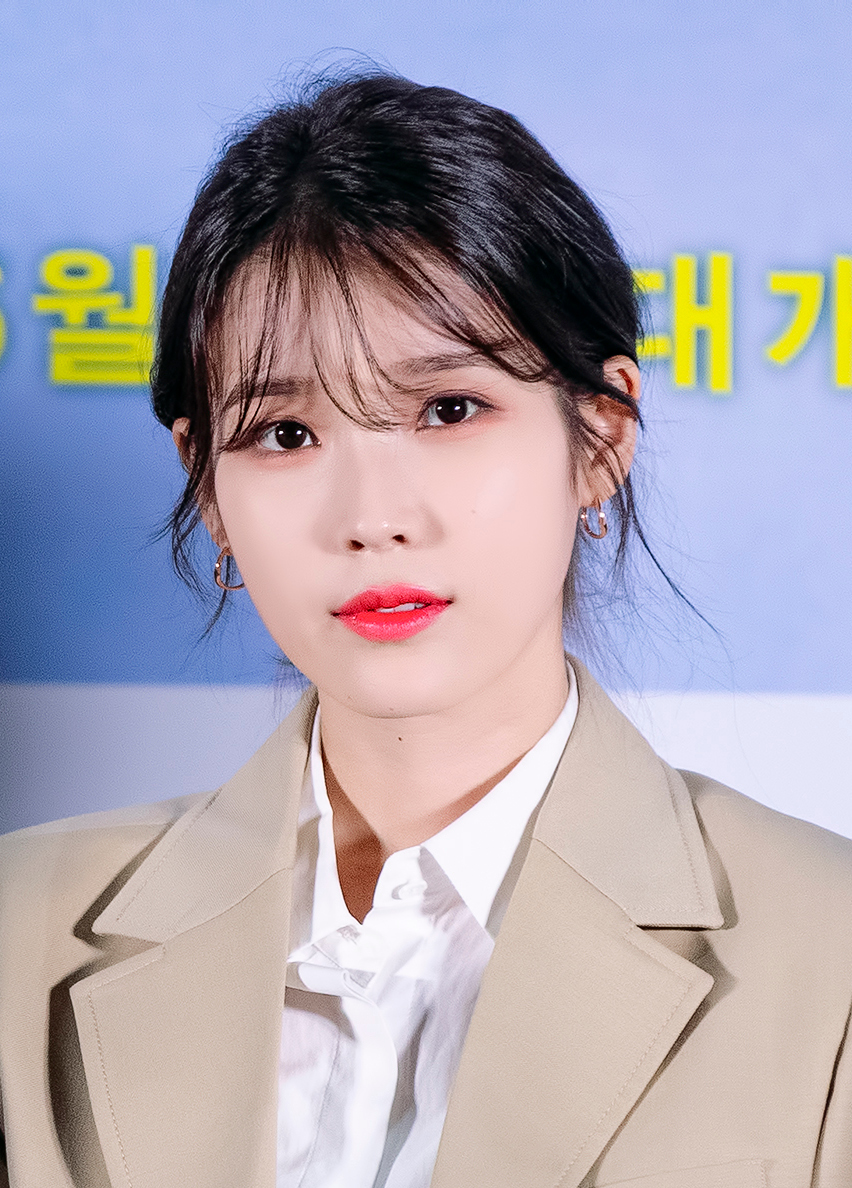
IU (Ae-sun / Geum-myeong)

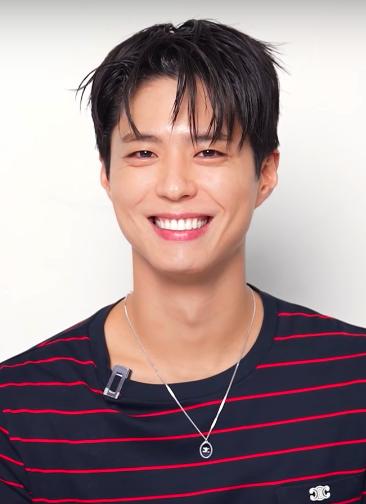
Park Bo-gum (Gwan-sik)

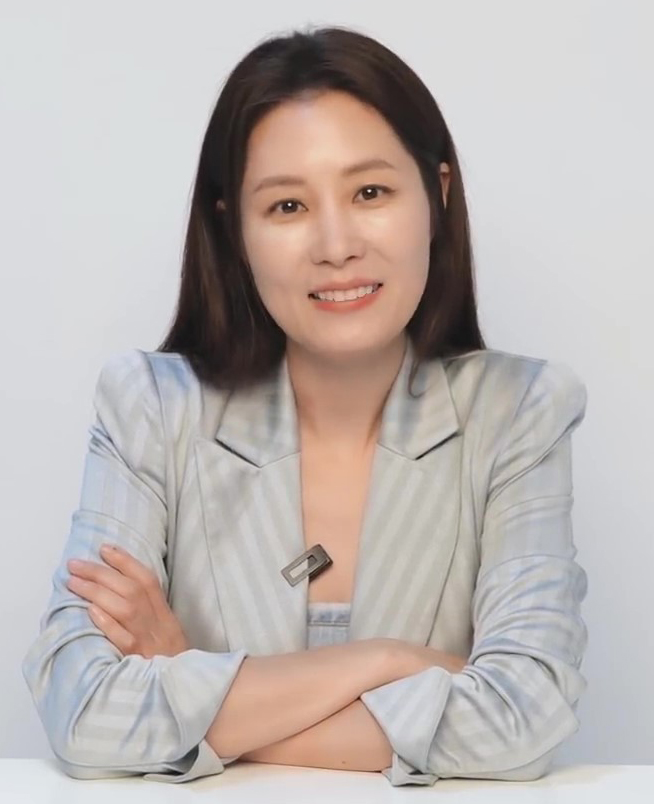
Moon So-ri (Middle-age Ae-sun)

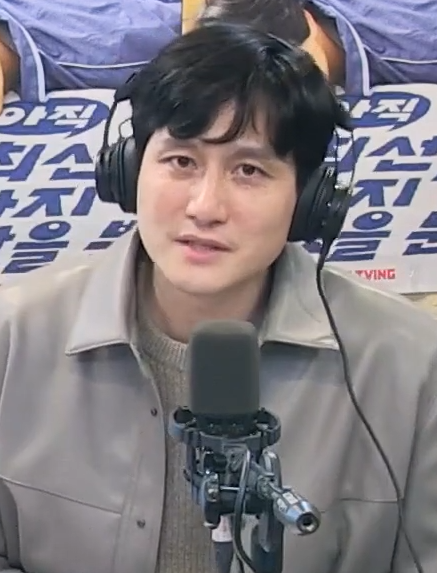
Park Hae-joon (Middle-age Gwan-sik)

On January 27, 2023, IU and Park Bo-gum were confirmed in the roles of the main characters Ae-sun and Gwan-sik respectively. IU and Park Bo-gum, both born in 1993, have been friends since starring in a television commercial together in their teens, with Park Bo-gum making a cameo in IU's drama The Producers (2015) in their twenties.

This is the second collaboration between director Kim Won-seok and IU after the 2018 tvN drama series My Mister. On January 30, 2023, Moon So-ri and Park Hae-joon were officially confirmed to play the older versions of Ae-sun and Gwan-sik, respectively. This marks the fourth appearance of Park Hae-joon in a Kim Won-seok-directed drama following Misaeng: Incomplete Life (2014), My Mister (2018), Arthdal Chronicles (2019). Choi Dae-hoon's casting was confirmed in October 2023, with filming for the series reportedly commencing in March 2023.

The first script reading took place in March 2023, together with the confirmation of the casting of Na Moon-hee, Kim Yong-rim, and Lee Jun-young. Lee Soo-kyung's casting was confirmed in May 2023, with Baek Ji-won's being confirmed the following month. In July 2023, Oh Jeong-se was confirmed to join the cast, with Kim Seon-ho making a guest appearance. Jung Yi-seo's casting was confirmed in August 2023, with Lee Soo-mi and Yeom Hye-ran joining the series the following month.

== Release ==
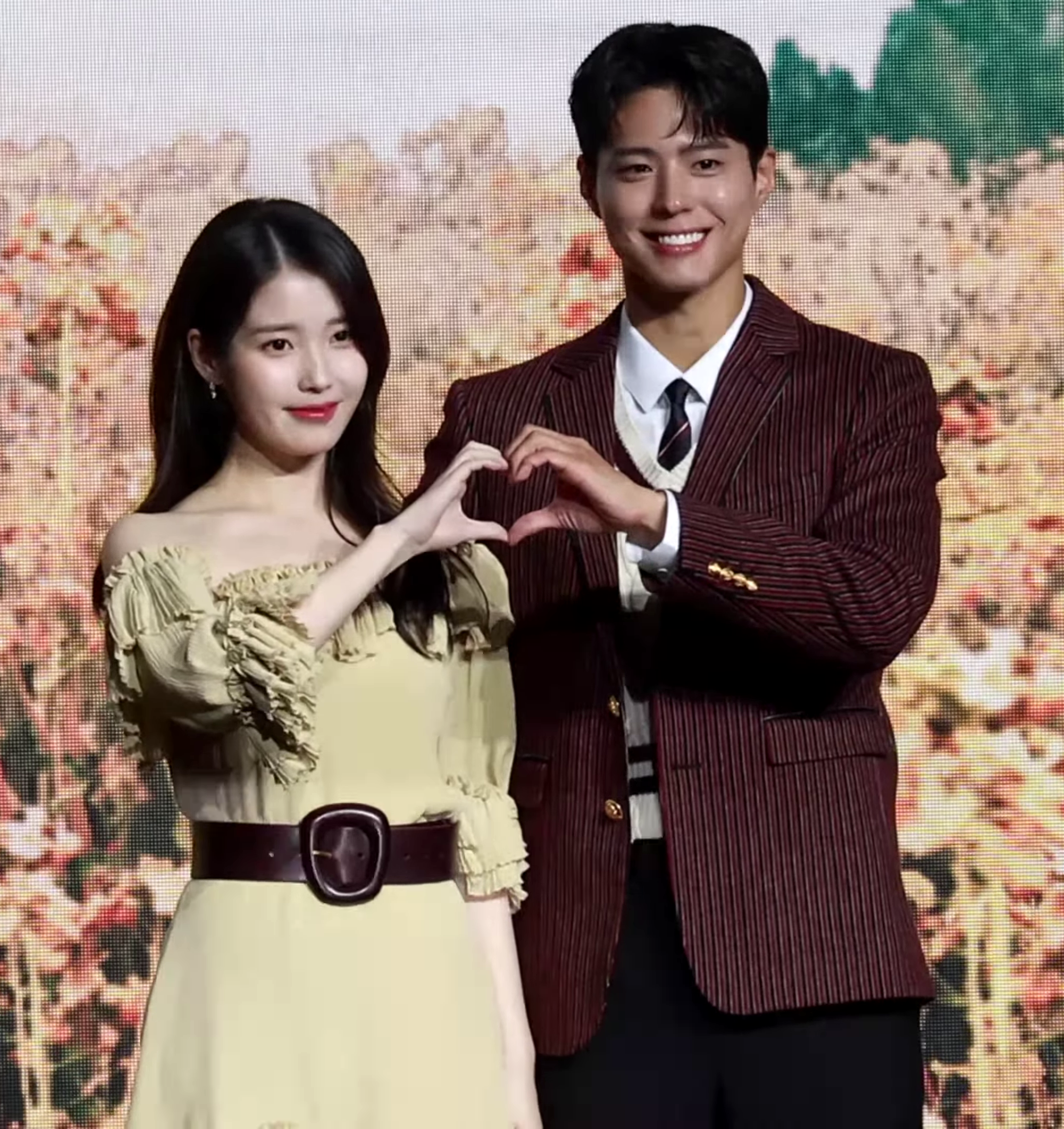
Leads IU and Park Bo-gum at the series official press conference, March 5, 2025

In April 2023, it was announced that PAN Entertainment signed a production contract with Netflix, and the series was planned to be released in 190 countries in 2024 through the platform. On January 30, 2024, media outlets shared the script reading photos of the drama and confirmed its exclusive release on Netflix worldwide. In January 2025, Netflix confirmed that the series will be released in four volumes comprising four episodes with each volume starting March 7, 2025. Netflix hosted a press conference at the Conrad Seoul Hotel in Yeongdeungpo District, Seoul on March 5, 2025. Director Kim Won-seok, along with IU, Park Bo-gum, Moon So-ri, and Park Hae-joon, were present at the event.

== Marketing ==
IU and Park Bo-gum appeared in KBS1's Gayo Stage to promote the series. They performed a duet of "Mountain Boy's Love Story" while wearing the traditional high school uniforms of their characters. The idea to appear in the show came from Park Bo-gum, stating that it was a way to appeal to a wider generation of audience.

Netflix Korea generated additional revenue through intellectual property collaborations aimed at drama enthusiasts. A partnership with Yuhan-Kimberly resulted in the launch of a limited edition Kleenex Moisturizing Essence Lotion, with packaging featuring the drama; this product sold out during the pre-order phase. Collaboration with design studio Oimu produced stationery items, including notebooks, letter paper, and rapeseed bookmarks, which quickly sold out at the Inventario stationery fair. Official merchandise including keychains and plushies of Ae-sun and Gwan-sik, was also released. The platform also partnered with a life insurance company to feature quotes in the series as the company's advertising material.

Netflix held the event "Well Done! Well Done! Geumeundong Village Feast" on March 30, 2025, at the Myeonghwa Live Hall. The event was attended by IU, Park Bo-gum, Park Hae-joon, Oh Min-ae, Jang Hye-jin, Kang You-seok, and Lee Soo-kyung. It featured an awards ceremony and a reading session, where the actors read the winning works selected by writer Lim Sang-choon from submissions to the When Life Gives You Tangerines 100-day event, held both online and offline. They also joined a panel discussion with the actors moderated by Movement CEO Jin Myeong-hyeon.

In February, Netflix organized an early screening of the series for nine grandmothers from Seonheul-ri, who then created paintings inspired by the story. The Social Museum is hosting an art exhibition titled "Pokssak Sogatsuda, Doldo, Eomeongdo, Halmangdo" from May 2 to June 29, 2025, at the Seonheulri Painting Workshop and Nonghyup Warehouse in Jeju. The exhibition showcases paintings by the nine grandmothers and their art teacher, Choi So-yeon. IU attended the exhibition in June.

== Original soundtrack ==
=== When Life Gives You Tangerines OST from the Netflix Series - Act 1 ===
When Life Gives You Tangerines OST from the Netflix Series - Act 1

Soundtrack album by Various Artists
- Released: 2025-03-08
- Genre: Soundtrack
- Languages: Korean; English
- Label: Kakao Entertainment / Netflix

When Life Gives You Tangerines OST from the Netflix Series - Act 1
No.	Title	Artist	Length
1.	"Midnight Walk" (밤 산책; Bam sanchaek)	d.ear	3:13
2.	"Ode to the Green Spring" (청춘가; Cheongchunga)	Chu Da-hye	3:36
3.	"Ode to the Green Spring (instrumental)" (청춘가; Cheongchunga (instrumental))	Chu Da-hye	3:36
4.	"Neoyeong Nayeong" (너영나영; Neoyeongnayeong)	Ahn Eun-kyung and Sim Eun-yong	2:46
5.	"Name" (이름; Ireum)	Kwak Jin-eon	4:11
6.	"Name (instrumental)" (이름; Ireum)	Kwak Jin-eon	4:11
Total length:			20:33

=== When Life Gives You Tangerines OST from the Netflix Series - Act 2 ===
When Life Gives You Tangerines OST from the Netflix Series - Act 2

Soundtrack album by Various Artists
- Released: 2025-03-15
- Genre: Soundtrack
- Languages: Korean; English
- Label: Kakao Entertainment / Netflix

When Life Gives You Tangerines OST from the Netflix Series - Act 2
No.	Title	Artist	Length
1.	"Hwal Hwal" (활활; Hwalhwal)	Hwang So-yoon	5:37
2.	"Hwal Hwal (instrumental)" (활활; Hwalhwal (instrumental))	Hwang So-yoon	5:37
3.	"To the Land of Hope" (희망의 나라로; Huimangui nararo)	Choi Baek-ho	2:55
4.	"To the Land of Hope (instrumental)" (희망의 나라로; Huimangui nararo (instrumental))	Choi Baek-ho	2:55
Total length:			17:04

=== When Life Gives You Tangerines OST from the Netflix Series - Act 3 ===
When Life Gives You Tangerines OST from the Netflix Series - Act 3

Soundtrack album by Various Artists
- Released: 2025-03-22
- Genre: Soundtrack
- Language: Korean
- Label: Kakao Entertainment / Netflix

When Life Gives You Tangerines OST from the Netflix Series - Act 3
No.	Title	Artist	Length
1.	"Midnight Walk" (밤 산책; Bam sanchaek)	IU	3:14
2.	"My Love By My Side" (내사랑 내곁에; Naesarang naegyeote)	Hong Isaac	4:56
3.	"My Love By My Side (instrumental)" (내사랑 내곁에; Naesarang naegyeote (instrumental))	Hong Isaac	4:56
Total length:			13:06

=== When Life Gives You Tangerines OST from the Netflix Series - Combined ===
When Life Gives You Tangerines OST from the Netflix Series - Combined

Soundtrack album by Various Artists
- Released: 2025-03-29
- Genre: Soundtrack
- Languages: Korean; English
- Label: Kakao Entertainment / Netflix

CD 1 (Vocal)
No.	Title	Artist	Length
1.	"Midnight Walk" (밤 산책)	d.ear	3:13
2.	"Ode to the Green Spring" (청춘가)	Chu Da-hye	3:36
3.	"Name" (이름)	Kwak Jin-eon	4:11
4.	"Hwal Hwal" (활활)	Hwang So-yoon	5:37
5.	"To the Land of Hope" (희망의 나라로)	Choi Baek-ho	2:55
6.	"My Love By My Side" (내사랑 내곁에)	Hong Isaac	4:56
7.	"Midnight Walk" (밤 산책)	IU	3:14
Total length:			27:42

CD 2

No.	Title	Artist	Length
1.	"Spring in a Heartbeat" (호로록 봄)	Park Sung-il	1:48
2.	"Theme of Ae-sun" (애순의 테마)	Park Sung-il	2:36
3.	"So Is My Heart Like Spring?" (그래서 내맘이 봄인가)	Kim Ji-ae	3:15
4.	"Stupid Abalone" (개점복)	Jeon Se-jin	2:25
5.	"Give Me 100 Hwan Every Day" (맨날 맨날 백환 줘)	Uncle Sam	1:07
6.	"Theme of Gwan-sik" (관식의 테마)	Park Sung-il	2:43
7.	"Your Daughter Worries" (똘내미 속 다 타두룩)	Jeon Se-jin	2:14
8.	"Mental and Financial Compotence" (물심양면)	Jeon Se-jin	2:24
9.	"Yesterday Was Your Spring" (그들의 봄은)	Yoon Hyun-gyeom	2:28
10.	"The Cabbages Are Sweet" (양배추 달아요)	Kim Ji-ae	2:36
11.	"They Did Not Back Down" (노빠꾸의 그들이 있었다)	Kim Hyun-do	2:52
12.	"You Are the Apple of My Eyes" (눈 감으면 아삼삼)	Kim Ji-ae	2:40
13.	"Epically Generous Busan" (직이는 부산 인심)	Park Won-jin	2:36
14.	"Slowly Take Your Time Get Busy" (천천히 사부작 사부작)	Ryu Seung-min	2:30
15.	"Like Butter in a Frying Pan" (후라이판 위에 인절미)	Yoon Hyun-gyeom	1:59
16.	"Not Making Any Money Tonight" (오늘 장사 공칬다)	Kim Hyun-do	3:04
17.	"Where's My Bag" (도둑맞은 가방)	Kim Hyun-do	2:32
18.	"Maybe It's My Mom Crying" (울 엄마가 우나 봐요)	Jeon Se-jin	2:59
19.	"I Don't Have Anywhere to go" (갈 데가 없어서요)	Yoon Ha-bin	2:47
20.	"Why Do You Take Everything That Belongs to Me" (왜 내꺼만 다가져가)	Park Sung-il	2:24
21.	"If She Hadn't Run That Day" (그때 뛰지 않았더라면)	Park Sung-il	2:35
22.	"Sassy Spring" (요망진 봄)	Ryu Seung-il	2:56
23.	"Eternal Nostalgia" (영원한 노스텔지어)	Judah Earl	2:12
24.	"Neo Yeong Na Yeong" (너영나영)	Eun-kyung Ahn	2:46
25.	"Young Head of the Family" (어린 가장)	Jeon Se-jin	2:43
26.	"Steelheart at Dawn" (무쇠의 새벽)	Zoran	3:48
27.	"Just Take It Easy" (쉬영갑서)	Jeon Se-jin	2:40
28.	"If She Ever Says She's Struggling" (고달프다고 한마디 하거든)	Jeon Se-jin	3:44
29.	"A Midsummer Night 's Full Nets" (한 여름 밤의 만선)	Yoon Hyun-gyeom	2:32
30.	"I Think I Was Always Pregnant" (엄만 맨날 배만 불렀던 것 같다)	Ryu Seung-min	2:40
31.	"GEUM, EUN, DONG" (금은동)	Zoran	2:46
32.	"On the Seawall" (방파제 위에)	Zoran	2:43
33.	"A Collapsed Retaining Wall" (무너진 축대)	Kim Hyun-do	2:47
34.	"On the Day Their World Collapsed" (그들의 하늘이 무너지던 날)	Park Sung-il	2:58
35.	"In Those Fierceful Waters" (그 드신 물속에서)	Tsumugu Misugi	3:03
36.	"Two-Faced Summer" (여름의 두 얼굴)	Park Sung-il	1:26
37.	"They Fell Down But Got Back Up Again" (그렇게 눕고 또 일어났다)	Judah Earl	3:10
38.	"Dad's' Heaven" (아빠의 천국)	Yoon Hyun-gyeom	2:11
39.	"Was That Summer of Our Live" (그때가 우리 여름이었나)	Ryu Seung-min	2:12
40.	"No Child Grows Without a Bit of Rebllion" (뿔 안 나고 크는 자식이 어딨어)	Jeong Jin-mok	2:22
41.	"Twenty Years of One-Sided Love" (이십 년 짝사랑)	Yoon Hyun-gyeom	2:33
42.	"But the World Away from Their Embrace Was Jungle" (품 밖의 세상은 정글이었다)	Zoran	2:50
43.	"I Do Know Her" (안다)	Kim Ji-ae	3:08
44.	"Goodness Pays Off in the End" (착한 끝)	Kim Dong-min	2:57
45.	"Looking Back, Spring Was Like a Feast" (봄은 지나고 보면 잔치였지만)	Ryu Seung-min	2:38
46.	"I Didn't Know at That Time" (그때는 몰랐다)	Judah Earl	2:57
47.	"A mother's instinct" (엄마의 촉)	Park Won-jin	2:49
48.	"The Devoted Heart That Even Prevents Coincidences" (우연을 막는 지극한 마음)	Zoran	4:31
49.	"A Cold Hand" (차가운 손)	Judah Earl	2:28
50.	"You Do Everything Well" (너는 다 잘해)	Park Sung-il	2:09
51.	"Just Be a Good Son, That's All" (너는 착한 아들만 하라고)	Park Sung-il	1:04
52.	"Craving My Mom's Cooking" (엄마 밥이 먹고 싶어젔다)	Zoran	2:37
53.	"That Day I Saw a Different Sun" (그날 나는 다른 해를 봤다)	Jeremy Chontow	2:30
54.	"A Kind-Hearted Mother Gave Birth to a Kind-Hearted Daughter" (착한 어미가 착한 딸을 낳아)	Lim Bo-mi	2:45
55.	"The Season When You Lose Your Second Tooth" (두 번째 이가 빠지는 계절)	Park Sung-il	3:16
56.	"Picasso's Room" (피카소의 방)	Yoon Hyun-gyeom	2:23
57.	"Third Time's The Charm" (기회는 삼세번)	Judah Earl	2:06
58.	"Two Men on a Boat" (배 위에 두 남자)	Jeong Jin-mok	2:35
59.	"Geun-myeong is Truly a Blessing to Me" (저는 금명이가 그렇게도 예쁩니다)	Jang Hyo-won	2:35
60.	"I'm Bu Sang-gil of Dodong-ri" (도동리 부상길)	Ryu Seung-min	2:14
61.	"How Lucky She Is to Be Treated Like That" (저 여자는 뭔 복에 저런 대접을 받고)	Jang Hyo-won	2:00
62.	"You Eat Out Before Coming Home?" (저녁 좀 먹고 들어와요)	Jeong Jin-mok	2:21
63.	"The Eldest Daughter's Weight" (무거운 장녀 노릇)	Yoon Ha-bin	2:39
64.	"A Rock That Never Erodes In the Sea of My Heart" (내 가심 바당에 삭지 않는 돌 하나)	Park Sung-il	1:39
65.	"Sore Finger Dad Was Mom's Soft Spot" (아픈 손가락)	Jang Hyo-won	2:33
66.	"The Reward Heung-bu Earned" (흥부가 따낸 포상)	Jang Hyo-won	2:16
67.	"Their Boat Came Back with Full Nets" (그들의 배가 만선이 됐다)	Yoon Ha-bin	2:34
68.	"Morning Sea" (아침바다)	Kim Hyun-do	2:53
69.	"Twilight Ride" (황혼의 라이딩)	Ryu Seung-min	2:06
70.	"The Old Mariner" (늙은 마도로스)	Ryu Seung-min	2:14
71.	"Cinderella's Shoe" (신데렐라의 구두)	Kim Dong-min	2:19
72.	"A Season Where the Wind Never Rested" (바람 잘일 없는 계절)	Kim Hyun-do	2:31
73.	"A Daughter Becoming a Mother Like Her Own" (엄마의 딸이 또 엄마가 되어 갔다)	Kim Hyun-do	3:22
74.	"That Deeply Precious Uncle" (잘도 아꾸운 삼촌)	Park Sung-il	4:04
75.	"My Guitar Story" (나의 기타이야기)	Yoon Hyun-gyeom	2:14
76.	"May Time Stand Still on That Day" (시간이 그 날에 멈추기를)	Kim Hyun-do	3:10
77.	"Looking Back It Was a Paradise" (돌아보니 낙원이었다)	Park Sung-il	1:31
78.	"Sometimes Spring, Sometimes Winter" (때때로 봄, 때때로 겨울)	Park Sung-il	3:03
Total length:			194:09

== Reception ==
=== Critical response ===
The series was a domestic and international hit. It received plaudits for its performances, screenplay, and direction, and has been favorably compared to the acclaimed period drama Reply 1988 (2015–16), for eliciting nostalgia and warmth rooted in the Korean experience. On the review aggregator website Rotten Tomatoes, 100% of 9 critics' reviews are positive, with an average rating of 8.9/10.

Time magazine praised the series for being "devastatingly profound", showing not only "the story of one family" but also "the story of Korea's modernization from the postwar period to today" and highlighting "a rich and distinct cultural history" of Jeju island. India Today stated that the series "isn't just a love story, nor is it merely a historical drama. It's a meditation on time, on love, and on the quiet labor of care that stretches across lifetimes." Per South China Morning Post the series "masterfully bridged past and present, blurring the line between nostalgic reverie and pressing reality" calling it "one of the very best K-dramas of all time – and quite possibly the most Korean of them all." The series was also praised by the Chinese Communist Party-owned daily tabloid Global Times.

=== Viewership ===
The series was in Netflix's Top 10 Non-English Shows for nine weeks.

When Life Gives You Tangerines Viewership per Netflix
Week	Date	Global Rank (Non-English series)	Viewing time (In hours)	Runtime (In hours) (Note: Four episodes were released weekly, for four weeks)	Views (In millions)	Ref.
1	March 3–9, 2025	4th	13,900,000	4.28	3.60	
2	March 10–16, 2025	2nd	48,100,000	8.36	6.00	
3	March 17–23, 2025	1st	65,500,000	12.16	5.50	
4	March 24–30, 2025	3rd	99,400,000	16.45	6.00	
5	March 31 – April 6, 2025	1st	89,700,000	16.45	5.40	
6	April 7–13, 2025	3rd	60,600,000	16.45	3.70	
7	April 14–20, 2025	4th	45,200,000	16.45	2.70	
8	April 21–27, 2025	7th	32,800,000	16.45	2.70	
9	April 28 – May 4, 2025	9th	26,400,000	16.45	1.60	

=== Impact ===
Following its release in the first week of March, the series topped the Good Data Corporation's Top 10 TV-OTT Drama Topicality Ranking for seven consecutive weeks. During this period, IU ranked first in the buzz-worthy drama performer category. Park Bo-gum rank second for six consecutive weeks and third the following week. In the third week of March, Lee Jun-young was fourth, and Kim Seon-ho was tenth. In the fourth week, Kim Seon-ho ranked third, Lee Jun-young eighth, and Kang You-seok tenth.

In addition, the series ranked first in Gallup Korea's nationwide survey of favorite TV programs for March, April, and May 2025. It was Netflix's fifth series to rank first for three consecutive months. It was also the first drama to surpass a 10% preference rating since January 2013. Park Bo-gum was named Gallup Korea's Television Actor of the Year, with IU in second place; he became the first artist to top the poll for an OTT release.

According to the mobile big data platform Mobile Index, Netflix reported 14 million monthly active users (MAUs) in March 2025, reflecting an increase of over 640,000 from the previous month. This marked the first time Netflix's MAUs exceeded 14 million since January 2023, when the drama The Glory gained significant popularity. Following the initial public release of the series, Pan Entertainment's stock price rose by 22.12%. Ahead of the second release, the stock reached 3,930 won, surpassing its 52-week high.

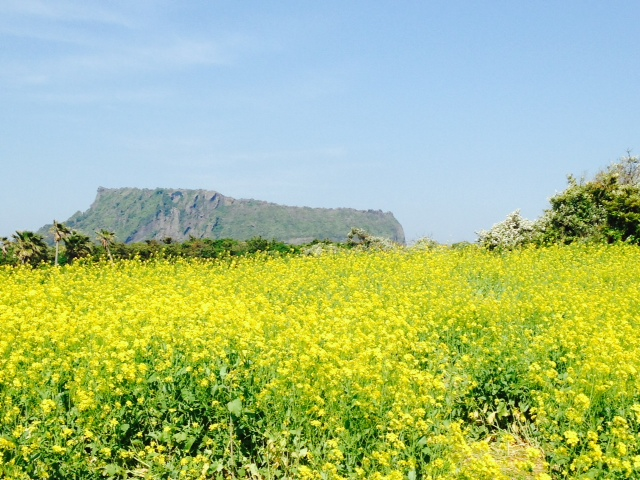
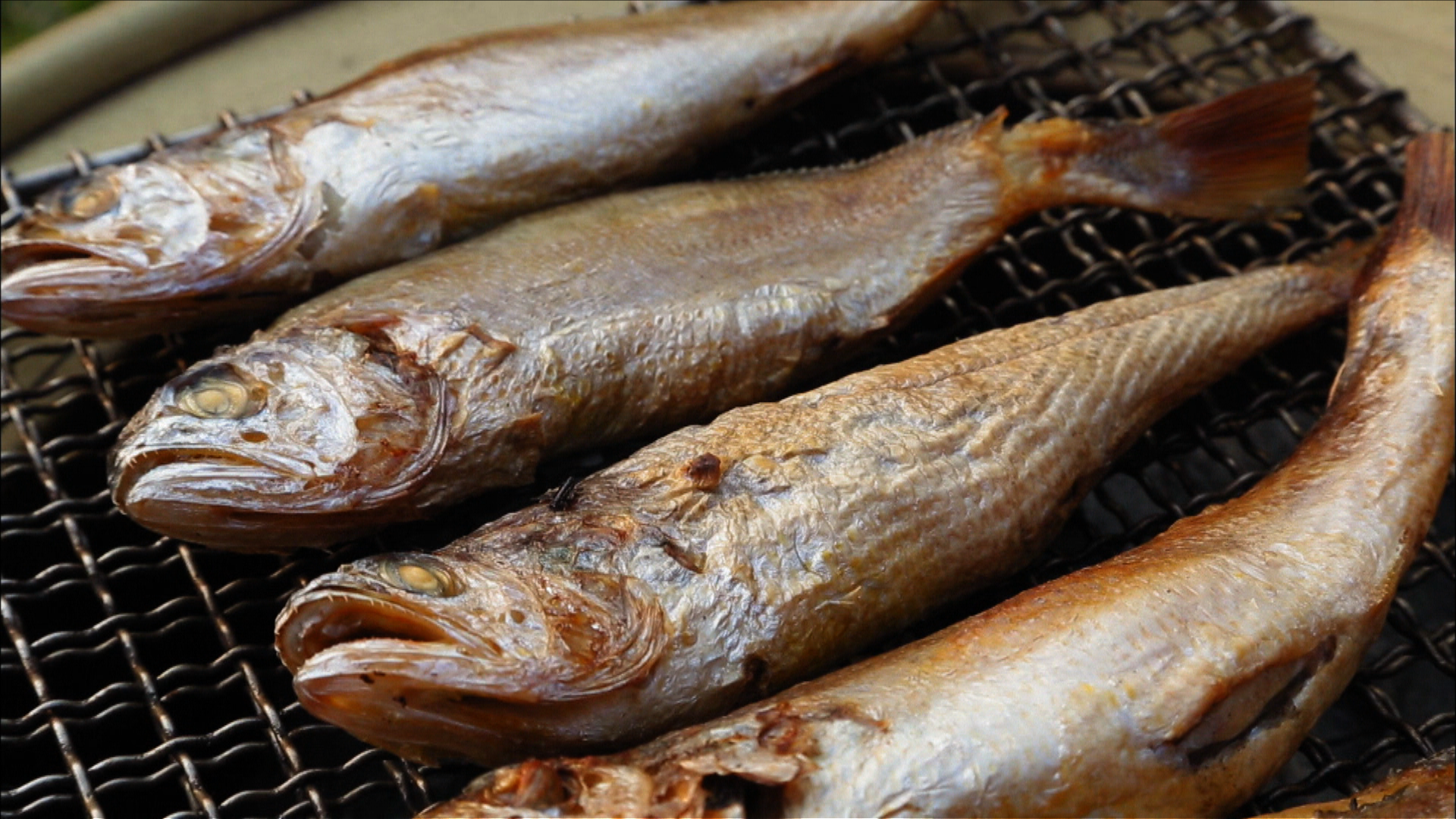
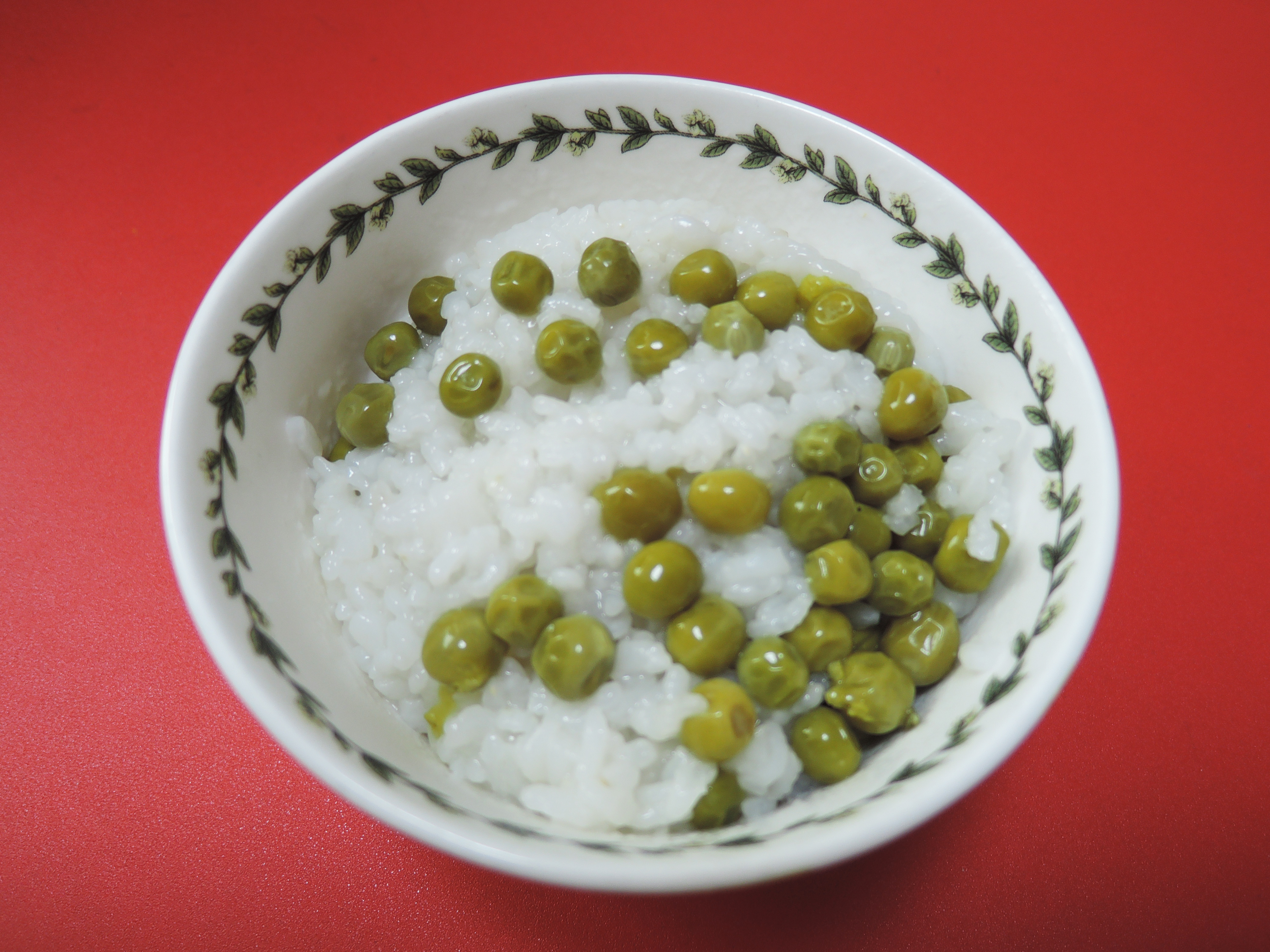
Clockwise from top: Rapeseed field in Jeju island, pea on rice, and croakers gained increased attention due to the series

The show had a major influence on popular culture, resulting in the creation of the term "Pokssak Sogatsuda Craze" (Korean: 폭싹 속았수다 열풍) shaping trends in furniture, fashion, food, and tourism. The mother-of-pearl chest treasured by Ae-sun in the drama prompted a trend of refurbishing similar chests on social media. The fashion styles of Ae-sun and Gwan-sik in the drama led to a resurgence of retro chic, also known as Grandmacore. Online shopping sites reported a spike in searches for these styles after the drama's release, with items like pearl hairpins, dot scarves, checkered ties, and floral shirts experiencing a notable increase in sales. A school lunch menu with dishes inspired by the series, such as barley and pea rice, squid, and croaker, gained popularity on social media. These dishes subsequently appeared in various cafeterias, including Hybe's cafeteria, further increasing online interest. Sales of sesame oil, perilla oil, soju brands, fried chicken brands, and snacks from the show have also experienced a significant boost.

The Jeju Tourism Organization observed a surge in interest in Jeju, the main setting of the series, prompting airlines to increase flights to Jeju during Golden Week. Major airlines like Korean Air, Asiana Airlines, and Jeju Air reported that all flights to Jeju on the first week of May were fully booked. In addition, after the success of the series, Jeju's local government and Netflix Korea signed the "Business Agreement for Activation of Jeju Culture and Tourism and Content" on May 16, 2025.

IU and Park Bo-gum's rendition of "Mountain Boy's Love Story" in Gayo Stage was praised, with the song becoming popular in streaming and social media as well as karaoke rooms. Park Bo-gum and Park Hae-joon's portrayals of Gwan-sik have been well received both domestically and internationally. Their depiction of a loving husband sparked a meme referred to as "Gwan-sik-ness," with the phrase "My Own Gwan-sik" trending on social media as users shared posts about partners and fathers exhibiting similar loving behaviors. Choi Dae-hoon's portrayal also led to the "Hak-ssi Craze," with the catchphrase "Hak-ssi" becoming well-known and earning him the nickname "Mr. Hak-ssi." Additionally, "Kim Seon-ho's smile challenge," in which netizens mimic his wink and smile from the drama became viral on social media globally.

The series' recognition led to unauthorized use of its images. A supermarket in Hebei, China, used images of the main characters from the drama in advertisements without permission, including scenes of Park Bo-gum as Gwan-sik selling cabbages and IU as Ae-sun holding a cup of pea rice. On June 2, 2025, shortly before the 2025 South Korean presidential election, candidate Kim Moon-soo posted a parody of the series on his social media replacing the faces of Park Bo-gum and IU with his and his wife's. Prior to this, he wore a red tracksuit similar to Gwan-sik's costume while campaigning in Jeju. Some viewers questioned whether Netflix had authorized the use and expressed concerns about politicizing the show. On June 3, Netflix stated that it was aware of the parody but had not approved it and was monitoring for further unauthorized uses.

== Accolades ==
=== Awards and nominations ===
Name of the award ceremony, year presented, category, nominee of the award, and the result of the nomination
Award ceremony	Year	Category	Nominee	Result	Ref.
Asia Artist Awards	2025	Artist of the Year, Actor (Daesang)	IU	Won	
Asia Artist Awards	2025	Best Actor of the Year, OTT (Daesang)	Park Bo-gum	Won	
Asia Artist Awards	2025	Best Actress of the Year, OTT (Daesang)	Moon So-ri	Won	
Asia Artist Awards	2025	Best Actor, Male	Lee Jun-young	Won	
Asia Artist Awards	2025	Best Artist	IU	Won	
Asia Artist Awards	2025	Best Artist	Park Bo-gum	Won	
Asia Artist Awards	2025	Best Artist	Moon So-ri	Won	
Asia Artist Awards	2025	Best Couple	IU & Park Bo-gum	Won	
Asia Artist Awards	2025	Scene Stealer	Choi Dae-hoon	Won	
APAN Star Awards	2025	Grand Prize (Daesang)	IU	Won	
APAN Star Awards	2025	Drama of the Year	When Life Gives You Tangerines	Won	
APAN Star Awards	2025	Best Director	Kim Won-seok	Won	
APAN Star Awards	2025	Best Screenwriter	Lim Sang-choon	Nominated	
APAN Star Awards	2025	Top Excellence Award, Actress in a Miniseries	IU	Nominated	
APAN Star Awards	2025	Top Excellence Award, Actor in a Miniseries	Park Bo-gum	Nominated	
APAN Star Awards	2025	Excellence Award, Actor in a Miniseries	Lee Jun-young	Won	
APAN Star Awards	2025	Excellence Award, Actor in a Miniseries	Park Hae-joon	Nominated	
APAN Star Awards	2025	Excellence Acting Award, Actor	Choi Dae-hoon	Nominated	
APAN Star Awards	2025	Excellence Acting Award, Actress	Yeom Hye-ran	Nominated	
APAN Star Awards	2025	Best New Actor	Kang You-seok	Won	
APAN Star Awards	2025	Best Child Actor	Kim Tae-yeon	Won	
APAN Star Awards	2025	Best Child Actor	Lee Cheon-mu	Won	
Asian Academy Creative Awards	2025	Best Drama series	When Life Gives You Tangerines	Nominated	
Asian Academy Creative Awards	2025	Best Direction (Fiction)	Kim Won-seok	Nominated	
Asian Academy Creative Awards	2025	Best Screenplay	Lim Sang-choon	Nominated	
Asian Academy Creative Awards	2025	Best Actor — South Korea	Park Bo-gum	Won	
Asian Pop Music Awards	2025	Best OST	"Midnight Walk"	Won	
Baeksang Arts Awards	2025	Best Drama	When Life Gives You Tangerines	Won	
Baeksang Arts Awards	2025	Best Director	Kim Won-seok	Nominated	
Baeksang Arts Awards	2025	Best Actor	Park Bo-gum	Nominated	
Baeksang Arts Awards	2025	Best Actress	IU	Nominated	
Baeksang Arts Awards	2025	Best Supporting Actor	Choi Dae-hoon	Won	
Baeksang Arts Awards	2025	Best Supporting Actress	Yeom Hye-ran	Won	
Baeksang Arts Awards	2025	Best New Actress	Kim Tae-yeon	Nominated	
Baeksang Arts Awards	2025	Best Screenplay	Lim Sang-choon	Won	
Bechdel Day	2025	Bechdel Choice 10	When Life Gives You Tangerines	Included	
Blue Dragon Series Awards	2025	Grand Prize	When Life Gives You Tangerines	Won	
Blue Dragon Series Awards	2025	Best Drama	When Life Gives You Tangerines	Nominated	
Blue Dragon Series Awards	2025	Best Actor	Park Bo-gum	Nominated	
Blue Dragon Series Awards	2025	Best Actress	IU	Won	
Blue Dragon Series Awards	2025	Best Supporting Actor	Choi Dae-hoon	Nominated	
Blue Dragon Series Awards	2025	Best Supporting Actress	Yeom Hye-ran	Won	
Blue Dragon Series Awards	2025	Best New Actor	Kang You-seok	Nominated	
Brand of the Year Awards	2025	Best Actor (OTT)	Park Bo-gum	Won	
Brand of the Year Awards	2025	Best Actor (Vietnam)	Park Bo-gum	Won	
Brand of the Year Awards	2025	Best Actress (OTT)	IU	Won	
Brand of the Year Awards	2025	Best Actress (Vietnam)	IU	Won	
Brand of the Year Awards	2025	Male Actor (Rising Star)	Lee Jun-young	Won	
Cine21 Film Awards	2025	Series Staff of the Year	Ryu Seong-hie and Choi Ji-hye	Won	
Daejeon Special Effects Film Festival - DFX OTT Awards	2025	Grand Prize (Technology Award - Work Category)	When Life Gives You Tangerines	Won	
Daejeon Special Effects Film Festival - DFX OTT Awards	2025	Art Prize (Technical Award - Artwork Category)	Ryu Seong-hie and Choi Ji-hye	Won	
Fundex Awards	2025	Program of the Year (Daesang)	When Life Gives You Tangerines	Won	
Fundex Awards	2025	Performer of the Year (Daesang)	Park Bo-gum	Won	
Fundex Awards	2025	Best OTT Original Drama	When Life Gives You Tangerines	Won	
Fundex Awards	2025	Best Leading Male Performer on OTT	Park Bo-gum	Won	
Fundex Awards	2025	Best Leading Female Performer on OTT	IU	Won	
Fundex Awards	2025	Best Supporting Actor of OTT Original Drama	Lee Jun-young	Nominated (Note: Won by Lee Jun-young for different series, Weak Hero Class 2.)	
Fundex Awards	2025	Best Supporting Actor of OTT Original Drama	Kang You-seok	Nominated	
Fundex Awards	2025	Popular Star Prize K-Drama Actor	Park Bo-gum	Nominated	
Fundex Awards	2025	Popular Star Prize K-Drama Actor	IU	Nominated	
Global K-Culture Awards	2025	Grand Prize (Culture Category)	Moon So-ri	Won	
Global OTT Awards	2025	Best Creative	When Life Gives You Tangerines	Won	
Global OTT Awards	2025	Best Director	Kim Won-seok	Nominated	
Global OTT Awards	2025	Best Screenplay	Lim Sang-choon	Won	
Global OTT Awards	2025	Best Actress	IU	Nominated	
Global OTT Awards	2025	Best Supporting Actor	Choi Dae-hoon	Nominated	
Global OTT Awards	2025	Best Supporting Actress	Yeom Hye-ran	Won	
KCA Culture and Entertainment Awards	2025	Drama Award 2025 Audience's Drama of the Year Award	When Life Gives You Tangerines	Won	
KCA Culture and Entertainment Awards	2025	Drama Production Company	Pan Entertainment	Won	
KCA Culture and Entertainment Awards	2025	Best Director	Kim Won-seok	Won	
KCA Culture and Entertainment Awards	2025	Best Screenwriter	Lim Sang-choon	Won	
KCA Culture and Entertainment Awards	2025	Actress of the Year Chosen by Public	Moon So-ri	Won	
Korea Culture and Entertainment Awards	2025	Best Actor	Park Hae-joon	Won	
Korea Drama Awards	2025	Best Drama	When Life Gives You Tangerines	Nominated	
Korea Drama Awards	2025	Top Excellence Award, Actor	Park Bo-gum	Nominated	
Korea Drama Awards	2025	Top Excellence Award, Actress	IU	Nominated	
Korea Drama Awards	2025	Excellence Award, Actor	Lee Jun-young	Nominated	
Korea Drama Awards	2025	Best New Actor	Kang You-seok	Nominated	
New Media Content Awards Ceremony	2025	Grand Prize (Mid-length/Long-length Category)	When Life Gives You Tangerines	Won	
Newsis K-Expo Cultural Awards	2025	Minister of Culture, Sports and Tourism Award	IU	Won	
Seoul International Drama Awards	2025	Outstanding Korean Drama	When Life Gives You Tangerines	Won (Note: Tied with The Trauma Code: Heroes on Call)	
Seoul International Drama Awards	2025	Best Director	Kim Won-seok	Nominated	
Seoul International Drama Awards	2025	Best Screenwriter	Lim Sang-choon	Nominated	
Seoul International Drama Awards	2025	Outstanding Korean Actress	IU	Won	
Seoul International Drama Awards	2025	Outstanding Asian Star	Park Bo-gum	Nominated	

=== Listicles ===
Name of publisher, year listed, name of listicle and placement
Publisher	Year	Listicle	Placement	Ref.
Collider	2025	10 Best K-Romances of 2025	1st	
Entertainment Weekly	2025	The 21 best Korean shows on Netflix to watch now	1st	
South China Morning Post	2025	The 15 best K-dramas of 2025	1st	
Teen Vogue	2025	15 Best K-Dramas of 2025	Included	
Time Magazine	2025	The 10 Best K-Dramas of 2025	1st	
