= Moon Woo-jin =

South Korean actor (born 2009)

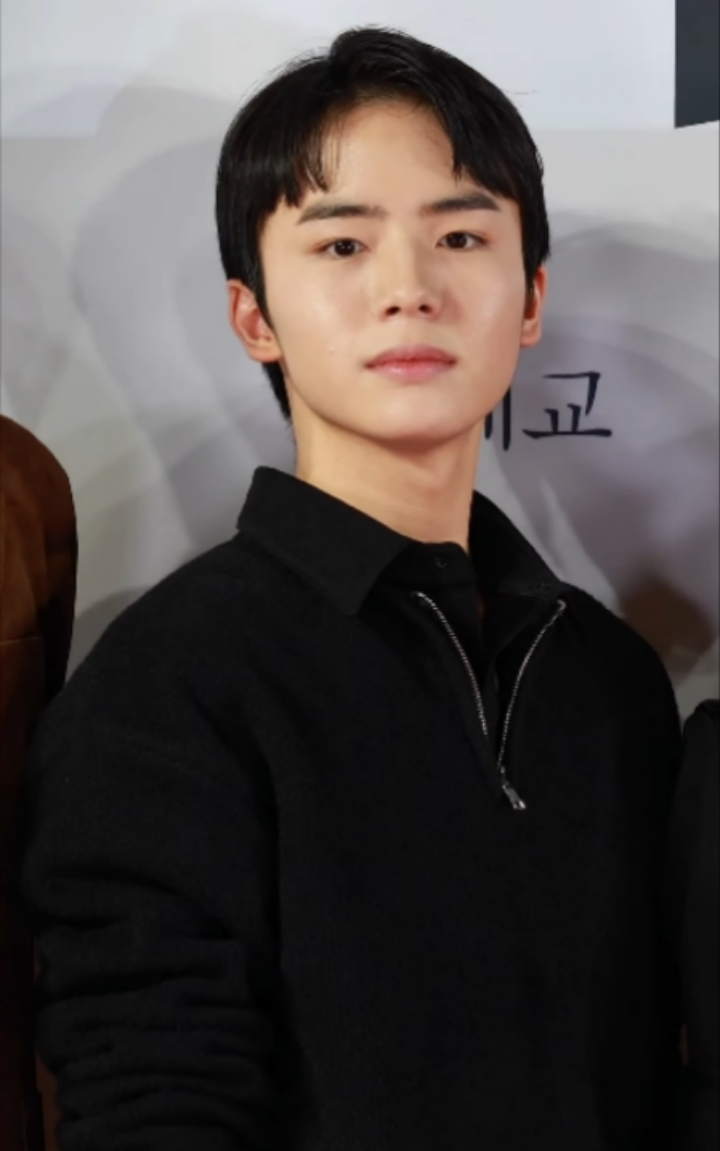
- Moon in January 2025
- Born: February 19, 2009 (age 17); Incheon, South Korea
- Occupation: Actor
- Years active: 2017–present
- Agent: T-One Entertainment
- Works: Filmography
- Awards: Male Youth Acting Award at the 2020 KBS Drama Awards

Korean name
- Hangul: 문우진
- RR: Mun Ujin
- MR: Mun Ujin

Moon Woo-jin (Korean: 문우진; born February 19, 2009) is a South Korean child actor. He made his acting debut in 2016 and has since had roles in television series What's Wrong with Secretary Kim (2018), It's Okay to Not Be Okay (2020), and The Atypical Family (2024).

== Life and career ==
Moon Woo-jin was born on February 19, 2009 in Incheon, South Korea. In 2016, he made his first public appearance in Jeju Air's Space Museum CF then made his acting debut in 2016 with his special appearance on SBS TV series Our Gap-soon.

Moon is affiliated to T-One Entertainment artist management company. He started to gain more public recognition for his acting as the young male lead in 2018 drama What's Wrong with Secretary Kim. In 2020, Moon appeared in KBS family weekend drama Once Again and got awarded as the best young actor for the first time at the 2020 KBS Drama Awards. Moon was appointed as Incheon's public relations ambassador. In September 2021, he participated in Save the Heart contest serving as a public model for the "Let's share our hearts" campaign. In 2025, he portrayed his first villain role in his acting career through the Disney+ original drama Unmasked, where he portrayed a brutal serial killer without blood or tears.

== Filmography ==
=== Film ===
Year	Title	Role	Notes	Ref.
2020	Peninsula	Dong-hwan		
2022	MoonParkJiHo	Ji-ho	short film	
2023	Where Would You Like to Go?	Park Hae-soo		
2024	Hijack 1971	Lee Han-bong		
2025	Dark Nuns	Hee-joon		
2025	The Accordion Door	Ji-soo		

=== Television series ===
Year	Title	Role	Notes	Ref.
2016	Our Gap-soon	Extra	Episode 50, 53, and 55	
2016	The Person Who Gives Happiness	Young Lee Geon-u		
2017	Suspicious Partner	Young Ji Eun-hyuk		
2017	Unknown Woman	Hysterical child		
2017	Bad Thief, Good Thief	Young Jang Min-jae		
2017	The King in Love	Young Wang Won		
2017	Live Up to Your Name	Young Heo Im		
2017–2018	Man in the Kitchen	Young Lee So-won		
2017–2018	Oh, the Mysterious	Han Kang		
2018	My Contracted Husband, Mr. Oh	Young Oh Jak-doo		
2018	Come and Hug Me	Young Chae Do-jin		
2018	About Time	Young Lee Do-ha		
2018	What's Wrong with Secretary Kim	Young Lee Yeong-joon		
2018	Life on Mars	Kyung Ho	Episode 6	
2018	My ID Is Gangnam Beauty	Young Do Kyeong-seok		
2018	The Beauty Inside	Han Se-gye	Episodes 8 and 9	
2018-19	Gangnam Scandal	Young Hong Se-hyeon		
2019	The Fiery Priest	Young Kim Hae-il		
2019	Kill It	Young Kim Soo-hyun		
2019	Arthdal Chronicles	Young Ta Gon		
2019	Watcher	Young Kim Young-goon		
2019	Vagabond	Cha Hoon	Episodes 1, 7, and 9	
2019	My Country: The New Age	Young Seo Hwi		
2020	Once Again	Kim Ji-hoon		
2020	The King: Eternal Monarch	Young Kang Shin-jae / Kang Hyeon-min		
2020	It's Okay to Not Be Okay	Young Moon Gang-tae		
2020	Alice	Young Park Jin-gyeom	Episodes 1 and 7	
2021	Joseon Exorcist	Grand Prince Kang-nyeong	2 episodes	
2021	The Devil Judge	Young Kang Yo-han		
2021	School 2021	Young Gong Ki-joon		
2022	Kiss Sixth Sense	Young Cha Min-hoo		
2023	Oh! Youngsim	Kang Woo-chan	Episode 2	
2023	Castaway Diva	Young Kang Bo-geol / Young Jung Ki-ho		
2023	Drama Special - Dog Days of Summer	Kim Yi-jun	Season 14, episode 5	
2024	The Atypical Family	Han Jun-woo		
2024	Dear Hyeri	Young Jung Hyun-oh		
2024	The Fiery Priest 2	Lee Sang-yeon		
2025	Unmasked	Son Jun-Yeong	Episode 2 & 3	
2025	My Dearest Nemesis	Young Ban Joo-yeon		
2025	When Life Gives You Tangerines	teen Yang Gwan-sik		
2025	You and Everything Else	Young Cheon Sang-heok		
2025	Spring of Youth	Young Sa-gye		
2026	The Scarecrow	teen Cha Si-young		

=== Music video appearances ===
Year	Title	Artist	Length	Ref.
2017	"Beautiful"	Wanna One	8:10	
2019	"Forever Love"	Min Kyung-hoon	3:44	
2019	"Thumbs Up"	Momoland	3:27	

== Awards and nominations ==
Award ceremony	Year	Category	Nominated work(s)	Result	Ref.
Baeksang Arts Awards	2025	Best New Actor – Film	Dark Nuns	Nominated	
Buil Film Awards	2025	Best New Actor	Dark Nuns	Nominated	
Busan International Film Festival	2025	Vision Award for Actor of the Year	The Accordion Door	Won	
KBS Drama Awards	2020	Best Young Actor	Once Again	Won	
KBS Drama Awards	2023	Best Young Actor	Dog Days of Summer	Won	
SBS Drama Awards	2019	Best Young Actor	Vagabond	Nominated	
SBS Drama Awards	2024	Best Young Actor	The Fiery Priest 2	Won	
