= Lim Sang-choon =

South Korean scriptwriter

- Born: 1985 (age 40–41); South Korea
- Occupation: Scriptwriter
- Years active: 2014–present
- Organization: Korea Television and Radio Writers Association (KTRWA)
- Agent: Pan Entertainment
- Notable work: Fight for My Way; When the Camellia Blooms; When Life Gives You Tangerines
- Spouse(s): married, undisclosed
- Honours: Commendation from the Minister of Culture, Sports and Tourism

Korean name
- Hangul: 임상춘
- Hanja: 林想賰
- RR: Im Sangchun
- MR: Im Sangch'un

Lim Sang-choon (Korean: 임상춘) is a South Korean screenwriter. She is primarily known for her work on the television dramas Fight for My Way (2017) and When the Camellia Blooms (2019) the latter of which earned her the Best Screenplay Award at the 56th Baeksang Arts Awards, the 15th Seoul International Drama Awards, the 2019 KBS Drama Awards, and 47th Korea Broadcasting Prizes.

Lim is currently a member of the Korea Television and Radio Writers Association (KTRWA) and is managed by Pan Entertainment. (Note: Korea Television and Radio Writers Association (KTRWA) is an association composed of thousands of South Korean writers who write the radio and/or television shows, news program, documentaries and translated scripts. This Association was established to protect all rights of broadcasting writers, including copyrights, and to contribute to the development of culture through the improvement and development of broadcasting literature and the exchange of broadcasting writers. The Association started as a social group in 1957 and was formally established in April 1988. In July of that year, the Association opened the Broadcasting Writers Education Center and received permission to manage copyright trusts, thereby taking a leading role in the protection of copyrights and other rights of broadcasting writers. There are currently around 3,700 active members from various fields, including variety program, documentary, drama, radio, translation, and entertainment.) Her name and copyrighted works as a television screenwriter are listed in both the KTRWA online database and Pan Entertainment's website.

== Career ==
The name 'Lim Sang-choon' is a pen name derived from the Chinese characters "想賰," which translates to "plentiful imagination." Lim adopted an androgynous pen name and maintains a private persona to mitigate potential biases related to gender and age. Her stated objective is to prioritize the narratives conveyed through her characters over personal recognition as an artist. Although her identity as a woman in her early 30s was revealed during the 2017 press conference for Fight for My Way, she reiterated her intention to remain anonymous and declined to disclose further personal details, indicating a preference to write under a different pen name should her anonymity be compromised. Consequently, she has not attended awards ceremonies to which she has been invited.

Prior to becoming a screenwriter, Lim worked at a company in her late 20s. She has stated that her aspiration to become a writer stemmed from observing the positive impact of dramas on viewers.

"I saw people smiling while watching dramas on their cell phones on the bus going home with their tired bodies. I thought I should write a drama that makes people happy."

She pursued screenwriting independently, studying existing scripts without formal training at a writer's education center. In 2013, Lim submitted her work to The 5th Drama Script Contest — Finding a Shooting Star in the Desert, with two of her scripts reaching the final screening. Despite her lack of formal training, she won the 'SBS Plus Award' at the contest. Subsequently, a producer who reviewed her scripts proposed a Chuseok special drama. In 2014, Lim debuted with the MBC Chuseok special drama "Lump in My Life." The drama, featuring actors Byun Hee-bong, Kang Hye-jung, Song Ok-sook, and child actor Kal So-won, depicts the reconciliation between a grandfather and granddaughter. The drama was also broadcast at the 2014 Short Drama Festival.

"The strength of writer Lim Sang-choon is that she writes realistic stories that are not absurd. She will be one of the few writers who can do both minis and weekend dramas."

— Producer Lee Kun-joon, Hankyoreh's Interview

Another of Lim's scripts was adapted into a mini-drama for The Ministry of Science, ICT and Future Planning's '2014 One-act Play Festival,' hosted by the Korea Communications Agency (KCA). The SBS Plus drama 'Dodohara' was directed by Yoon Ryun-hae. 'Dodohara' is a romantic comedy drama featuring Girl's Day's Yura, Shin So-yul, and Yoo Min-gyu, where a man and two women come together to create a fashion shopping mall.

Lim gained further recognition with KBS2 short drama Becky's Back in 2016. This four-episode Korean drama, starring Kang Ye-won, Jin Ji-hee, Kim Sung-oh, Choi Dae-chul, In Gyo-jin and Choi Phillip follows the return of Scarlet O'Hara Yang Baek-hee to the island of Seomwol-do after 18 years. It was well-received during its initial broadcast. Due to positive reception and viewer requests, KBS2 rebroadcast the director's cut of Becky's Back as a two-part series in March 2017, prior to the premiere of Lim's new drama Fight for My Way.

"All of Lim Sang-chun's works depict wrong prejudice against the weak and overcoming them. This time, she conveyed deep comfort by interpreting the community called Ongsan through the code of family."

— Drama critic Gong Hee-jeong

Fight for My Way, starring Park Seo-joon and Kim Ji-won, marked Lim's debut as a writer for a full-length drama series. Aired on KBS2 from May 22 to July 11, 2017, the series portrays the struggles of two childhood friends pursuing their career aspirations. The show achieved high viewership and topped the TV popularity index for three consecutive weeks. It was subsequently adapted into a manhwa.

In 2019, Lim returned with When the Camellia Blooms, a mini-series starring-series that stars Gong Hyo-jin, Kang Ha-neul, Kim Ji-seok, Son Dam-bi, and Kim Kang-hoon. Director Cha Young-hoon collaborated with Lim again after Becky's Back.

"The strength of writer Lim's script is its gripping power and tight character placement."

— Jo Eun-byeol
Bridge Economy and Culture Reporter, Weekly Kyunghyang Interview

Aired on KBS2 on Wednesdays and Thursdays, the series achieved the highest ratings for a mini-series drama in 2019, with a single episode reaching 23.8%. It also achieved a high average rating of 14.83% across all episodes. The show received 10 nominations at the 56th Baeksang Arts Awards, winning four, including the Grand Prize for Television and Best Screenplay Award. It also won multiple awards at the 2019 KBS Drama Awards, including the Grand Prize for Gong Hyo-jin and Best Scriptwriting for Lim. The series, blending romantic comedy and thriller elements, was released on Netflix in South Korea and several other regions following its television broadcast. (Note: For Japan, all episodes were launched at once on November 15, while for the rest of the world it was launched weekly from September 28.)

Lim's works convey a message of comfort, depicting individuals who have lost sight of their self-worth and regain it through the support of others.

"I want to write something to cheer people on, like putting air in their bikes until the day I die."

In August 2022, Lim made a return with series under the working title Life (Korean: 인생; RR: Insaeng). It was later announced that Kim Won-seok would direct. In December 2022, production designer Ryu Seong-hie confirmed her involvement. The original Korean title, Pokssak sogatsuda (Korean: 폭싹 속았수다), was revealed on January 27, 2023. This Jeju language expression translates to "thank you for your hard work." The English title, When Life Gives You Tangerines, was announced on January 30, 2023, and is a word play on the proverb "When life gives you lemons, make lemonade. The production cost of the series is reported to be around ₩60 billion. The series earned 8 nominations at the 61st Baeksang Arts Awards, winning four, including the Best Television Drama and Best Screenplay Award for Lim. Lim and the drama was also considered for Grand prize.

== Filmographies ==
=== Television series ===
Filmographies
Year	Title		Network	Credited as		Note
Year	English	Korean	Network	Creator	Writer	Note
2014	2014 Drama Festival – Lump of My Life	2014 드라마 페스티벌 – 내 인생의 혹	MBC	No	Yes	
2014	Dodohara	도도하라	SBS Plus	No	Yes	
2016	Becky's Back	백희가 돌아왔다	KBS2	No	Yes	
2017	Fight for My Way	쌈 마이웨이	KBS2	No	Yes	
2019	When the Camellia Blooms	동백꽃 필 무렵	KBS2	No	Yes	

=== Web series ===
Filmographies
Year	Title		Network	Credited as		Note
Year	English	Korean	Network	Creator	Writer	Note
2025	When Life Gives You Tangerines	폭싹 속았수다	Netflix	No	Yes	

== Recurring cast ==
Recurring casts
Actor Work	Baek Ji-won	Choi Dae-chul	In Gyo-jin	Jeon Bae-soo	Jin Ji-hee	Kim Kang-hoon	Kim Sung-oh	Lee Jung-eun	Oh Jung-se	Yeom Hye-ran
Lump of My Life										
Dodohara										
Becky's Back		check	check	check	check		check			
Fight for My Way	check		check	check	check		check	check		
When the Camellia Blooms		check	check	check		check		check	check	check
When Life Gives You Tangerines	check					check			check	check

== Accolades ==
=== Awards and nominations ===
Awards and nominations
Year	Ceremony	category	Nominated work	Result	Ref.
2013	The 5th Drama Script Contest 'Finding the Shooting Star in the Desert'	SBS Plus Award	Puberty	Won	
2018	54th Baeksang Arts Awards	Best Screenplay – Television	Fight for My Way	Nominated	
2018	13th Seoul International Drama Awards	Best Screenwriter	Fight for My Way	Nominated	
2019	KBS Drama Awards	Best Screenwriter	When the Camellia Blooms	Won	
2020	56th Baeksang Arts Award	Grand Prize (Daesang)	When the Camellia Blooms	Won	
2020	56th Baeksang Arts Award	Best Screenplay – Television	When the Camellia Blooms	Won	
2020	47th Korea Broadcasting Prizes	Best Screenwriter	When the Camellia Blooms	Won	
2020	15th Seoul International Drama Awards	Best Screenwriter	When the Camellia Blooms	Won	
2025	61st Baeksang Arts Awards	Best Drama	When Life Gives You Tangerines	Won	
2025	61st Baeksang Arts Awards	Best Screenplay	When Life Gives You Tangerines	Won	
2025	Blue Dragon Series Awards	Grand Prize	When Life Gives You Tangerines	Won	
2025	Blue Dragon Series Awards	Best Drama	When Life Gives You Tangerines	Nominated	
2025	Global OTT Awards	Best Creative	When Life Gives You Tangerines	Won	
2025	Global OTT Awards	Best Screenplay	When Life Gives You Tangerines	Won	
2025	Seoul International Drama Awards	Best Screenwriter	When Life Gives You Tangerines	Pending	

=== State honors ===
Name of country, year given, and name of honor
Country	Award Ceremony	Year	Honor	Ref.
South Korea	11th Korean Popular Culture and Arts Awards (Note: The Korean Popular Culture and Arts Awards (대한민국 대중문화예술상) is an annual South Korean government-run awards ceremony hosted by the Ministry of Culture, Sports and Tourism's Korea Creative Content Agency. The ceremony, which was first held in 2010, "honor[s] those who have made a contribution to contemporary pop culture and the arts, including actors, singers, comedians and models.")	2020	Commendation from the Minister of Culture, Sports and Tourism	

== See also ==
- South Korean Screenwriter
