= Cheeze =

Cheeze may refer to:

- Cheeze (band), South Korean band
- Cheeze (singer), South Korean singer

== See also ==
- Cheez (disambiguation)
- Cheese (disambiguation)
