= List of awards and nominations received by Park Bo-gum =

Park Bo-gum awards and nominations
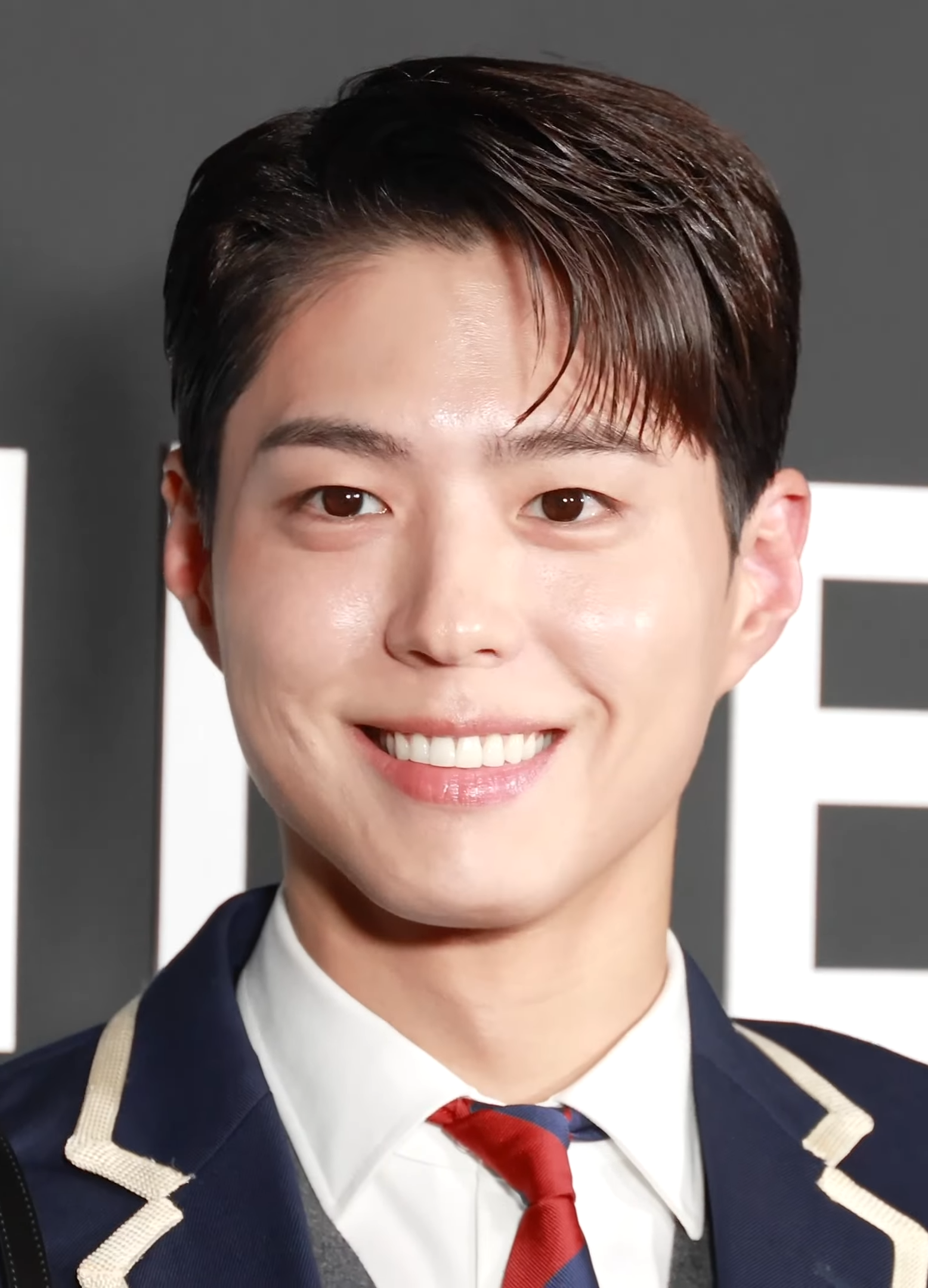
- Park in 2024
Awards and nominations
Award	Wins	Nominations
APAN Star Awards	1	5
Asia Artist Awards	7	11
Asian Academy Creative Awards	1	1
Baeksang Art Awards	2	5
Blue Dragon Series Awards	2	2
Brand of the Year Awards	3	3
DramaFever Awards	2	2
Fashionista Awards	2	2
Fundex Awards	2	4
Global OTT Awards	0	1
Golden Cinematography Awards	1	1
InStyle Icons: Next Generation	1	1
KBS Drama Awards	5	8
KBS Entertainment Awards	2	3
Korea Assembly Grand Award	1	1
Korea Brand Awards	0	2
Korea Broadcasting Prizes	1	0
Korea Drama Awards	0	3
Korea Musical Awards	0	1
Max Movie Awards	1	1
Melodi Awards	1	1
OSEN Awards	1	1
SBS Cultwo Show Awards	1	1
Seoul Global Movie Awards	0	1
Seoul International Drama Awards	1	2
Style Icon Asia	1	1
Top Chinese Music Awards	1	1
tvN10 Awards	1	3
Yahoo! Asia Buzz Awards	1	1

Totals (Note: Certain award groups do not simply award one winner. They acknowledge several different recipients, have runners-up, and have third place. Since this is a specific recognition and is different from losing an award, runner-up mentions are considered wins in this award tally. For simplification and to avoid errors, each award in this list has been presumed to have had a prior nomination.)
- Wins: 41
- Nominations: 68

South Korean actor and singer Park Bo-gum (Korean: 박보검) is known for his versatile performances and has been recognized with several awards and nominations across film, television, theater, and entertainment including two Grand Prizes (Daesang), (Note: A Daesang (Korean: 대상), which translates to "Grand Prize", is the highest honor given out at South Korean award ceremonies.) two Baeksang Arts Awards, a Blue Dragon Series Award, an Asian Academy Creative Award, a Seoul International Drama Award, and a Korea Broadcasting Prize. In addition, he is a two-time Gallup Korea's Television Actor of the Year (2016, 2025) and the first actor to ever top Forbes Korea Power Celebrity list (2017).

Park has also been accorded by his home country with several state honors including a Prime Minister's Commendation in 2022 for his active involvement in coal briquette charity, orphanage volunteer work, and comfort women support events – working to further expand his positive influence as a public figure.

== Awards and nominations ==
Name of the award ceremony, year presented, category, nominee of the award, and the result of the nomination
Award ceremony	Year	Category	Nominee / Work	Result	Ref.
APAN Star Awards	2015	Best New Actor	Naeil's Cantabile, Hello Monster	Nominated	
APAN Star Awards	2016	Best New Actor	Reply 1988	Won	
APAN Star Awards	2021	Excellence Award, Actor in a Miniseries	Record of Youth	Nominated	
APAN Star Awards	2021	Popular Star Award, Actor	Record of Youth	Nominated	
APAN Star Awards	2025	Top Excellence Award, Actor in a Miniseries	When Life Gives You Tangerines, Good Boy	Nominated	
Asia Artist Awards	2016	Popularity Award, Actor	Reply 1988, Love in the Moonlight	Nominated	
Asia Artist Awards	2016	Asia Star Award, Actor	Reply 1988, Love in the Moonlight	Won	
Asia Artist Awards	2016	Best Star Award, Actor	Reply 1988, Love in the Moonlight	Won	
Asia Artist Awards	2017	Popularity Award, Actor	Reply 1988, Love in the Moonlight	Nominated	
Asia Artist Awards	2025	Best Actor of the Year – OTT (Daesang)	When Life Gives You Tangerines	Won	
Asia Artist Awards	2025	Best Artist, Actor	When Life Gives You Tangerines, Good Boy	Won	
Asia Artist Awards	2025	Asia Star Award, Actor	When Life Gives You Tangerines, Good Boy	Won	
Asia Artist Awards	2025	Legendary Couple	Park Bo-gum (with Kim You-jung) for Love in the Moonlight	Won	
Asia Artist Awards	2025	Best Couple	Park Bo-gum (with IU) for When Life Gives You Tangerines	Won	
Asia Artist Awards	2025	Most Popular Actor	Park Bo-gum	Nominated	
Asia Artist Awards	2026	Popularity Award – Actor	Park Bo-gum	Pending	
Asian Academy Creative Awards	2025	Best Actor – South Korea	When Life Gives You Tangerines	Won	
Baeksang Arts Awards	2016	Best New Actor – Film	Coin Locker Girl	Nominated	
Baeksang Arts Awards	2016	InStyle Fashion Award	Park Bo-gum	Won	
Baeksang Arts Awards	2017	Best Actor – Television	Love in the Moonlight	Nominated	
Baeksang Arts Awards	2017	Most Popular Actor – Television	Love in the Moonlight	Won	
Baeksang Arts Awards	2025	Best Actor – Television	When Life Gives You Tangerines	Nominated	
Brand of the Year Awards	2025	Best Actor (OTT)	When Life Gives You Tangerines	Won	
Brand of the Year Awards	2025	Best Actor (Vietnam)	When Life Gives You Tangerines	Won	
Brand of the Year Awards	2025	Best Multi-Entertainer	The Seasons: Park Bo-gum's Cantabile	Won	
Blue Dragon Series Awards	2025	Best Actor	When Life Gives You Tangerines	Nominated	
Blue Dragon Series Awards	2025	Popular Star Award	When Life Gives You Tangerines	Won	
DramaFever Awards	2016	Best Rising Star	Reply 1988	Won	
DramaFever Awards	2016	Best Kiss	Park Bo-gum (with Lee Hye-ri) for Reply 1988	Won	
Fashionista Awards	2016	Best Dresser of the Year	Park Bo-gum	Won	
Fashionista Awards	2017	Best Fashionista (Red Carpet Category)	Park Bo-gum	Won	
Fundex Awards	2025	Performer of the Year (Daesang)	Park Bo-gum	Won	
Fundex Awards	2025	Best Leading Male Performer on TV	Good Boy	Nominated	
Fundex Awards	2025	Best Leading Male Performer on OTT	When Life Gives You Tangerines	Won	
Fundex Awards	2025	Best Player in a Seasonal or Mini TV Show	The Seasons: Park Bo-gum's Cantabile	Nominated	
Fundex Awards	2025	Popular Star Prize K-Drama Actor	Park Bo-gum	Nominated	
Global OTT Awards	2025	Best Actor	Good Boy	Nominated	
Golden Cinematography Awards	2021	Best New Actor	Seo Bok	Won	
InStyle Icons: Next Generation	2016	New Generation Actor Award	Park Bo-gum	Won	
KBS Drama Awards	2014	Best New Actor	Naeil's Cantabile, Wonderful Days	Nominated	
KBS Drama Awards	2015	Best Supporting Actor	Hello Monster	Won	
KBS Drama Awards	2015	Popularity Award, Actor	Hello Monster	Won	
KBS Drama Awards	2016	Grand Prize (Daesang)	Love in the Moonlight	Nominated	
KBS Drama Awards	2016	Top Excellence, Actor	Love in the Moonlight	Won	
KBS Drama Awards	2016	Excellence Award, Actor in a Mid-length Drama	Love in the Moonlight	Nominated	
KBS Drama Awards	2016	Netizen Award	Love in the Moonlight	Won	
KBS Drama Awards	2016	Best Couple	Park Bo-gum (with Kim You-jung); Love in the Moonlight	Won	
KBS Entertainment Awards	2015	Best Newcomer Award	Music Bank	Won	
KBS Entertainment Awards	2025	Grand Prize (Daesang)	The Seasons: Park Bo-gum's Cantabile, Music Bank World Tour	Nominated	
KBS Entertainment Awards	2025	Entertainer of the Year	The Seasons: Park Bo-gum's Cantabile, Music Bank World Tour	Won	
Korea Brand Awards	2017	Special Award	Park Bo-gum	Won	
Korea Broadcasting Prizes	2025	Best Entertainer	The Seasons: Park Bo-gum's Cantabile	Won	
Korea Drama Awards	2016	Excellence Award, Actor	Reply 1988	Nominated	
Korea Drama Awards	2017	Top Excellence Award, Actor	Love in the Moonlight	Nominated	
Korea Drama Awards	2025	Top Excellence Award, Actor	When Life Gives You Tangerines, Good Boy	Nominated	
Korea Musical Awards	2024	New Actor Award	Let Me Fly	Nominated	
Max Movie Awards	2016	Rising Star Award	Coin Locker Girl	Won	
Melodi Awards	2016	Most Influential Korean Drama Personality	Park Bo-gum	Won	
National Assembly Grand Awards (Note: Award is hosted by The National Assembly Popular Culture and Media Research Group)	2017	Acting Award	Park Bo-gum	Won	
OSEN Awards	2016	Star of the Year	Park Bo-gum	Won	
SBS Cultwo Show Awards	2016	Most Mentioned	Park Bo-gum	Won	
Seoul Global Movie Awards	2025	Popularity Award – Actor	When Life Gives You Tangerines, Good Boy	Nominated	
Seoul International Drama Awards	2017	Outstanding Korean Actor	Love in the Moonlight	Won	
Seoul International Drama Awards	2025	Outstanding Asian Star	When Life Gives You Tangerines	Nominated	
Style Icon Asia	2016	Style Icon	Park Bo-gum	Won	
Top Chinese Music Awards	2016	Best International Artist	Park Bo-gum	Won	
tvN10 Awards	2016	Made in tvN Actor, Drama	Reply 1988	Nominated	
tvN10 Awards	2016	Best Kiss	Park Bo-gum (with Lee Hye-ri); Reply 1988	Nominated	
tvN10 Awards	2016	Asia Star Award	Reply 1988	Won	
Yahoo! Asia Buzz Awards	2016	Asia Popular Artist Award	Park Bo-gum	Nominated	

== State honors ==
Name of the organization, year presented, and the honor or award given
Country	Organization	Year	Honor or Award	Ref.
South Korea	Financial Services Commission (Note: Honors are given at the Financial Day ceremony.)	2022	Prime Minister's Commendation	
South Korea	Korea Tourism Organization	2017	Special Achievement Award	
South Korea	Korean Popular Culture and Arts Awards (Note: Honors are given at the Korean Popular Culture and Arts Awards, arranged by the Korea Creative Content Agency and hosted by the Ministry of Culture, Sports and Tourism. They are awarded to those who have contributed to the arts and South Korea's pop culture.)	2017	Minister of Culture, Sports and Tourism Commendation	

== Listicles ==
Name of publisher, year listed, name of listicle, and placement
Publisher	Year	Listicle	Placement	Ref.
Cine21	2024	"Korean Film NEXT 50" – Actors	Included	
Forbes	2017	Korea Power Celebrity 40	1st	
Forbes	2018	Korea Power Celebrity 40	8th	
Forbes	2019	Korea Power Celebrity 40	18th	
Forbes	2020	Korea Power Celebrity 40	37th	
Forbes	2022	Korea Power Celebrity 40	40th	
Forbes	2025	Korea Power Celebrity 40	14th	
Forbes	2026	Korea Power Celebrity 40	14th	
Gallup Korea	2019	Korea's Favorite Actor	3rd	
Gallup Korea	2016	Television Actor of the Year	1st	
Gallup Korea	2017	Television Actor of the Year	4th	
Gallup Korea	2018	Television Actor of the Year	4th	
Gallup Korea	2019	Television Actor of the Year	4th	
Gallup Korea	2020	Television Actor of the Year	2nd	
Gallup Korea	2025	Television Actor of the Year	1st	
Gallup Korea	2020	Film Actor of the Year	21st	
Gallup Korea	2024	Film Actor of the Year	18th	
Gallup Korea	2025	Film Actor of the Year	18th	
Korea Broadcast Advertising Corporation	2017	Advertising Model of the Year	5th	
Korea Broadcast Advertising Corporation	2018	Advertising Model of the Year	4th	
Korea Broadcast Advertising Corporation	2019	Advertising Model of the Year	2nd	
Korea Broadcast Advertising Corporation	2020	Advertising Model of the Year	4th	
Korea Broadcast Advertising Corporation	2026	Advertising Model of the Year	4th	
Korean Film Council	2021	Korean Actors 200 (Note: The list introduces the 200 actors that best represent the present and future of Korean cinema to the people in the film industry all over the world.)	Included	
Star News (Note: Star News commissions Gallup Korea for the survey.)	2024	Best Television Couple of the Past Decade (Note: Only actor with two entries in the Top 10)	6th (Note: With Lee Hye-ri for Reply 1988 (2015–2016))	
Star News	2024	Best Television Couple of the Past Decade	10th (Note: With Kim You-jung for Love in the Moonlight (2016))	

== See also ==
- Park Bo-gum filmography
- Park Bo-gum discography
