= Cheese (disambiguation) =

Cheese is a dairy product usually made from the milk of cows, buffalo, goats or sheep.

Cheese may also refer to:

== Food ==
- Tofu cheese, or fermented bean curd
- Head cheese, a cold cut terrine or meat jelly
- Quince cheese, a jelly made of the pulp of the quince fruit
- Chuck E. Cheese, an American family entertainment center and restaurant chain

== Fictional characters ==
- Cheese (Foster's Home for Imaginary Friends)
- Big Cheese, the prime minister of Little Tokyo in the anime Samurai Pizza Cats
- Cheese the Chao, a character in the Sonic the Hedgehog franchise
- Cheese Wagstaff, a character on the TV series The Wire
- The Cheese, a character in the webcomic It's Walky!
- Chuck E. Cheese (character), mascot of the Chuck E. Cheese chain of restaurants
- Trainer Cheese, a non-playable opponent in Clash Royale

== Music ==
- Cheese (album), a 2010 album by Stromae
- Cheese, or Fleet Street, a 2004 album by the Stanford Fleet Street Singers
- Richard Cheese (born 1965), American musician and comedian

== Literature and visual art ==
- Cheese (novel), a novel by Willem Elsschot
- Cheese!, a Japanese manga magazine published by Shogakukan
- Bernard Cheese (1925–2013), British painter and printmaker, father of Chloe
- Chloe Cheese (born 1952), English artist, daughter of Bernard

== Photography, computing, and sports ==
- "Say cheese", an expression used in English-speaking countries when photographing people
- Cheese (software), a webcam application
- Kenyatta Cheese, American activist, software engineer, and businessman
- Cheese (speedrunner), a Super Mario 64 speedrunner
- Cheese, an object used in the sport of Skittles

== Other uses ==
- The Cheese, a New Zealand LPFM radio station
- Cheese (recreational drug)
- Cheese head (screw), a description of the shape of the head of some screws
- Cheese/Cheesy, used in the context of kitsch; see Camp (style)

== See also ==
- Cheez (disambiguation)
- Cheesy (disambiguation)
- Cheese It (disambiguation)
- Big Cheese (disambiguation)
