= Park Bo-gum filmography =

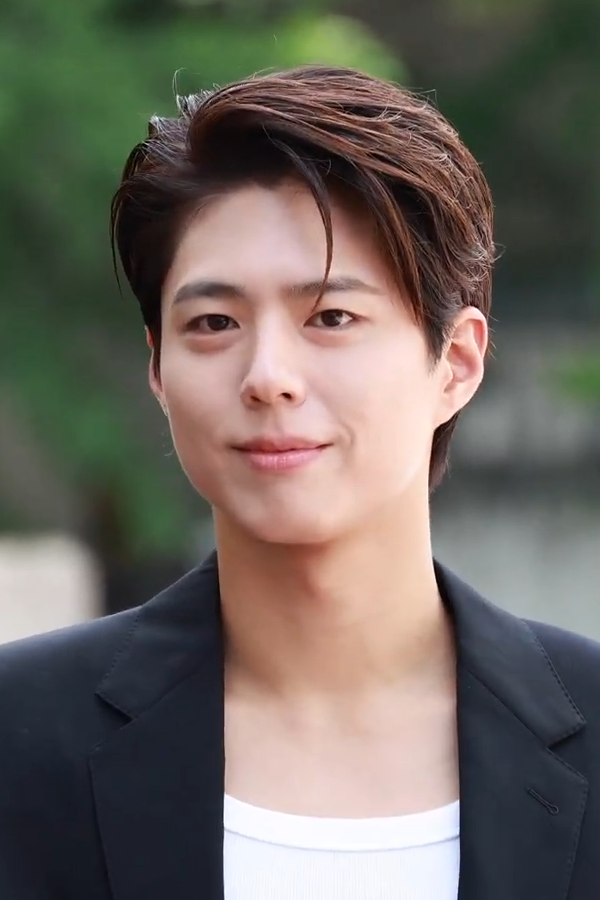
- Park in 2025
- Film: 11
- Television series: 15
- Television show: 8
- Documentary: 4
- Hosting: 30
- Music videos: 2
- Others: 4

Park Bo-gum (Korean: 박보검) is a South Korean actor and singer known for his performances across film, television, and theater which earned him numerous accolades. He debuted in the entertainment industry in 2011 with a role in the crime thriller film Blind. After a series of well-received roles in films, he had his breakthrough in the mystery series Hello Monster (2015) and family drama Reply 1988 (2015–16). He also gained attention for hosting the music program Music Bank (2015–16). This was followed by his first leading role in the historical romance Love in the Moonlight (2016) which made him a household name in South Korea. He then starred in the melodrama Encounter (2018–19) and coming-of-age series Record of Youth (2020) which catapulted him to further international prominence.

In 2021, he earned widespread praise for his first leading film role in sci-fi thriller Seo Bok. He then debuted on stage with the musical Let Me Fly in 2023, and starred in the sci-fi romance film Wonderland in 2024. After his military enlistment, he headlined the slice-of-life drama When Life Gives You Tangerines (2025) and action-comedy Good Boy (2025), both of which were critical and commercial successes. He hosted the late-night music talk show The Seasons: Park Bo-gum's Cantabile in 2025. In 2026, he led his own variety show titled The Village Barber for TvN.

== Film ==
Key
†	Denotes films that have not yet been released

Year	Title	Role	Notes	Ref.
2011	Blind	Min Dong-hyun		
2012	Runway Cop	young Cha Chul-soo		
2014	A Hard Day	Officer Lee Jin-ho		
2014	The Admiral: Roaring Currents	Bae Soo-bong		
2014	Twinkle-Twinkle Pitter-Patter	Jun-woo	Short film	
2015	Coin Locker Girl	Park Seok-hyun		
2021	Seo Bok	Seo Bok		
2024	Wonderland	Tae-joo		
2025	Never Ending Korea	Himself	Short film	
2026	Canvas of Blood †	Grand Prince Anpyeong		
2027	The Sword: Rebirth of the Red Wolf †	Chil-seong / Red Wolf		

== Television series ==
Year	Title	Role	Notes	Ref.
2012	Hero	Kang Dong-woo		
2012	KBS Drama Special – Still Picture	young Kim Hyun-soo	One-act drama	
2012	Bridal Mask	Han Min-kyu	Special appearance; Episodes 26–28	
2013	Wonderful Mama	Go Young-joon		
2014	Wonderful Days	young Kang Dong-seok		
2014	Naeil's Cantabile	Lee Yoon-hoo		
2015	The Producers	Himself	Cameo; Episode 9	
2015	Hello Monster	Jung Sun-ho / Lee Min		
2015–2016	Reply 1988	Choi Taek		
2016	Love in the Moonlight	Lee Yeong		
2018–2019	Encounter	Kim Jin-hyuk		
2020	Itaewon Class	Handsome chef	Cameo; Episode 16	
2020	Record of Youth	Sa Hye-jun		
2025	When Life Gives You Tangerines	Yang Gwan-sik		
2025	Good Boy	Yoon Dong-ju		

== Television shows ==
Year	Title	Role	Notes	Ref.
2015–2016	Music Bank	Host		
2016	Youth Over Flowers: Africa	Cast member		
2018	Hyori's Homestay: Season 2	Part-time employee	Episodes 6–10	
2022	Young Actors' Retreat	Cast member		
2024	My Name is Gabriel	Himself / Ruaidhri	Episodes 1–3	
2025	The Seasons: Park Bo-gum's Cantabile	Host	Season 7	
2025–2026	Reply 1988 10th Anniversary	Cast member		
2026	The Village Barber	Barber and barbershop owner		

== Documentaries ==
Year	Title	Role	Network	Ref.
2020	Blue Melody, Singing Hope	Narrator	Korean Forces Network	
2025	With a Heart That Sings of the Stars	Narrator	MBC Radio	
2025	Record of K-pop, Age of Exploration: Music Bank World Tour	Special appearance	KBS 1	
2026	Is Your Brain Running?	Narrator	EBS	

== Hosting ==
Year	Title	Notes	Ref.
2015	29th KBS Drama Awards	With Jun Hyun-moo, Kim So-hyun	
2016	KBS Song Festival	With Seolhyun	
2016	30th KBS Drama Awards	With Jun Hyun-moo, Kim Ji-won	
2017	Music Bank World Tour: Singapore	At Suntec Convention Centre; with Irene	
2017	Music Bank World Tour: Indonesia	At Jakarta International Expo; with Irene	
2017	19th Mnet Asian Music Awards	At Yokohama Arena, Japan	
2018	Music Bank World Tour: Chile	At Movistar Arena; with Jeongyeon	
2018	54th Baeksang Arts Awards	With Shin Dong-yup and Bae Suzy	
2018	Music Bank World Tour: Berlin	At Max-Schmeling-Halle; with Jeon So-mi	
2018	Music Bank World Tour: Hong Kong	At AsiaWorld–Arena; with Dahyun	
2018	2018 MAMA Fans' Choice in Japan	At Saitama Super Arena	
2019	55th Baeksang Arts Awards	With Shin Dong-yup and Bae Suzy	
2019	2019 Mnet Asian Music Awards	At Nagoya Dome, Japan	
2020	56th Baeksang Arts Awards	With Shin Dong-yup and Bae Suzy	
2020	2020 Republic of Korea Navy Patriotic Concert	With Park Se-young	
2021	2021 Republic of Korea Navy Patriotic Concert	With Kang A-rang	
2022	58th Baeksang Arts Awards	With Shin Dong-yup and Bae Suzy	
2022	2022 Republic of Korea Navy Patriotic Concert	With Kang A-rang	
2022	2022 MAMA Awards	At Kyocera Dome Osaka, Japan	
2023	59th Baeksang Arts Awards	With Shin Dong-yup and Bae Suzy	
2023	Music Bank World Tour: Paris	At Paris La Défense Arena	
2023	Music Bank World Tour: Mexico	At Palacio de los Deportes	
2023	2023 MAMA Awards	At Tokyo Dome in Japan	
2024	60th Baeksang Arts Awards	With Shin Dong-yup and Bae Suzy	
2024	Music Bank World Tour: Belgium	At Sportpaleis	
2024	Music Bank World Tour: Spain	At Auditorio Miguel Ríos, Rivas-Vaciamadrid	
2024	2024 MAMA Awards	At Dolby Theatre, United States; November 21	
2025	61st Baeksang Arts Awards	With Shin Dong-yup and Bae Suzy	
2025	Music Bank World Tour: Portugal	At MEO Arena	
2025	2025 MAMA Awards	At Kai Tak Stadium in Hong Kong	

== Music video appearances ==
Year	Song	Artist	Notes	Ref.
2015	"Forget You" (Teaser)	d.ear	Also vocals and piano	
2020	"I Will Give You All"	Lee Seung-chul	With Go Youn-jung	

== Others ==
Year	Exhibition	Role	Venue	Ref.
2023	Korea Heritage Service Presents Changgyeonggung Palace	Audio docent	Changgyeonggung Palace	
2023	Raoul Dufy: Melodies of Colors	Audio docent	Seoul Arts Centre	
2025	Marc Chagall Special Exhibition	Audio docent	Seoul Arts Centre	
2025–2026	Jean-Michel Basquiat: Signs Connecting Past and Future	Audio docent	Dongdaemun Design Museum	

== See also ==
- Park Bo-gum discography
- List of awards and nominations received by Park Bo-gum
