= Cheez =

Cheez may refer to:

- Cheez (music), compositions in Indian Classical Music
- Cheez TV, an Australian children's cartoon show
- Cheez-It, brand of cheese cracker
- Cheez Whiz, brand of processed cheese sauce
- Cheez Doodles, brand of cheese puff
- Cheezies, brand of cheese curl snack food sold in Canada
- Cheezels, brand of Australian snack food
- Cheez, a slang term for cheese

== See also ==
- Cheese (disambiguation)
- Cheesy (disambiguation)
- Cheeze (band), South Korean musical act
