= The Seasons (TV program) =

South Korean music talk show

- Program logo
- Hangul: 더 시즌즈
- RR: Deo sijeunjeu
- MR: Tŏ sijŭnjŭ
- Genre: Talk show; Music
- Presented by: Jay Park (Season 1); Choi Jung-hoon (Season 2); AKMU (Season 3); Lee Hyo-ri (Season 4); Zico (Season 5); Lee Young-ji (Season 6); Park Bo-gum (Season 7); 10cm (Season 8); Sung Si-kyung (Season 9)
- Opening theme: "Sunday Night Drive" by Jay Park (season 1); "Summer II" by Jannabi (season 2); "Last Goodbye" by AKMU (season 3); "Full Moon" by Lee Hyo-ri (season 4); "Artist" by Zico (season 5)
- Country of origin: South Korea
- Original language: Korean
- No. of seasons: 9
- No. of episodes: 136

Production
- Production location: South Korea
- Running time: 90 minutes

Original release
- Network: KBS2
- Release: February 5, 2023 – present

The Seasons (Korean: 더 시즌즈) is a South Korean late-night music talk show that airs on KBS2 every Friday at 22:00 / 23:20 (KST). It is a seasonal late-night music program with different hosts per season, showcasing musicians from various genres through in-depth interviews and live performances, and also features entertainers.

== Overview ==
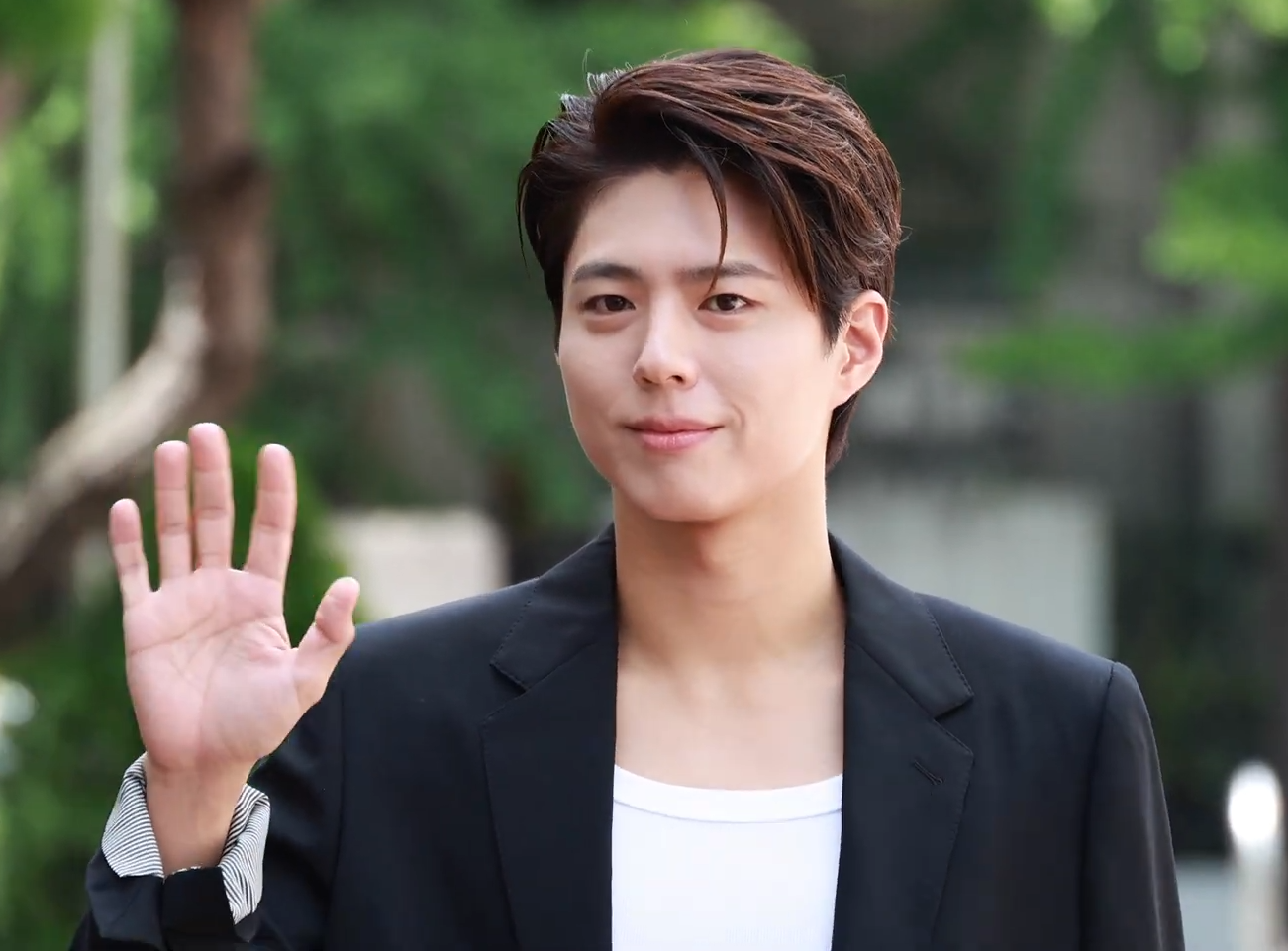
Season 7 host Park Bo-gum on his way to film The Seasons: Park Bo-gum's Cantabile, July 2025

The Seasons acts as a successor following the end of You Hee-yeol's Sketchbook after 13 years; adding to the long running "30-year legacy" of late night music talk shows broadcast by KBS alongside Lee Sora's Propose and Yoon Do-hyun's Love Letter among others. It was created with the intention to air four installations aligned with the four seasons of the year, each hosted by different stars with its own titles, following the KBS tradition of naming the late night music program after the artist. Its production assembled a young band led by pianist and composer, Jeong Dong-hwan of MeloMance, for the show to create a "well-made stage".

| Season | Episodes | | Originally released | | Host | Time slot (KST) |
| Season | Episodes | | First released | Last released | Host | Time slot (KST) |
|---|---|---|---|---|---|---|
| 1 | 12 | | February 5, 2023 | April 23, 2023 | Jay Park | Sunday 22:55 |
| 2 | 14 | 2 | May 14, 2023 | May 21, 2023 | Choi Jung-hoon | Sunday 22:55 |
| 2 | 14 | 12 | June 2, 2023 | August 18, 2023 | Choi Jung-hoon | Friday 22:00 |
| 3 | 14 | 7 | September 1, 2023 | October 20, 2023 | AKMU | Friday 22:00 |
| 3 | 14 | 7 | October 27, 2023 | December 22, 2023 | AKMU | Friday 23:20 |
| 4 | 13 | 4 | January 5, 2024 | January 26, 2024 | Lee Hyo-ri | Friday 23:20 |
| 4 | 13 | 9 | February 2, 2024 | March 29, 2024 | Lee Hyo-ri | Friday 22:00 |
| 5 | 17 | | April 26, 2024 | September 6, 2024 | Zico | Friday 22:00 |
| 6 | 19 | | September 27, 2024 | February 21, 2025 | Lee Young-ji | Friday 22:00 |
| 7 | 21 | | March 14, 2025 | August 1, 2025 | Park Bo-gum | Friday 22:00 / 23:20 |
| 8 | 25 | | September 5, 2025 | March 6, 2026 | 10cm | Friday 22:00 |
| 9 | TBA | | March 27, 2026 | TBA | Sung Si-kyung | Friday 22:00 |

== Seasons ==
=== I. The Seasons: Jay Park's Drive ===
The program began with The Seasons: Jay Park's Drive (박재범의 드라이브; Bak Jaebeomui deuraibeu) and its host Jay Park in February 2023; with its title named after the American-Korean artist's single, "Drive" (2016). It presented a segment called "Car Shout Out," conducting interviews and singing in a car with new artists.

Episodes

| Ep. | Broadcast date | Guest(s) | Ref. |
|---|---|---|---|
| 1 | February 5, 2023 | Lee Chan-hyuk (AKMU), Yang Hee-eun, Lee Young-ji, Balming Tiger, Crush | |
| 2 | February 12, 2023 | 10cm, MeloMance, Sion, Justhis, Jukjae | |
| 3 | February 19, 2023 | Dynamic Duo, Huh, Tanaka, Xooos, Be'O | |
| 4 | February 26, 2023 | Im Chang-jung, Paul Kim, Big Naughty, From All to Human | |
| 5 | March 5, 2023 | Hwasa (Mamamoo), Jang Dong-yoon, Seol In-ah, Lucy, DUT2 | |
| 6 | March 12, 2023 | Kwon Jin-ah, qman, J-Hope (BTS) | |
| 7 | March 19, 2023 | Johan Kim, Chancellor, Soran, Hwang So-yoon, Zior Park | |
| 8 | March 26, 2023 | MSG Wannabe, Wonstein, Peppertones, Kim Jae-hwan, Danny Koo | |
| 9 | April 2, 2023 | Roy Kim, Lee Mu-jin, Psick Univ, Mamamoo+, Navy Line (네이비라인) | |
| 10 | April 9, 2023 | Heize, Apink, George, Sokodomo | |
| 11 | April 16, 2023 | BOL4, Ive, The Rose, Jclef | |
| 12 | April 23, 2023 | Tiger JK, Jessi, The Korean Zombie, Baek Jong-won | |

Viewership

Average TV viewership ratings (audience share) In the ratings below, the blue numbers represent the lowest ratings and the red numbers represent the highest ratings.
| Ep. no. overall | Ep. no. in season | Original broadcast date | Nationwide (Nielsen Korea) |
|---|---|---|---|
| 1 | 1 | February 5, 2023 | 1.5% |
| 2 | 2 | February 12, 2023 | 0.9% |
| 3 | 3 | February 19, 2023 | 0.8% |
| 4 | 4 | February 26, 2023 | 0.9% |
| 5 | 5 | March 5, 2023 | 1.1% |
| 6 | 6 | March 12, 2023 | 0.7% |
| 7 | 7 | March 19, 2023 | 0.8% |
| 8 | 8 | March 26, 2023 | 0.8% |
| 9 | 9 | April 2, 2023 | 1.0% |
| 10 | 10 | April 9, 2023 | 0.7% |
| 11 | 11 | April 16, 2023 | 0.7% |
| 12 | 12 | April 23, 2023 | 1.0% |
| Average | | | 0.91% |

=== II. The Seasons: Choi Jung-hoon's Night Park ===
Its second season, The Seasons: Choi Jung-hoon's Night Park (최정훈의 밤의공원; Choe Jeonghunui bamuigongwon), hosted by Choi Jung-hoon of Jannabi, aired in May 2023; with its title named after his band's single, "Summer II" (2021). It presented a segment called "Re:Wake Project," where established musicians reinterpret their old songs and present them on broadcast stages and as music. Originally slated for twelve episodes, the program was extended for a fourteen episode second season. On the OTT platform Wavve, it recorded the highest viewing rate for people in their 20s as of April 25, 2024.

Episodes

| Ep. | Broadcast date | Guest(s) | Ref. |
|---|---|---|---|
| 1 | May 14, 2023 | Kim Chang-wan, Chang Kiha, Lee Dong-hwi, Lena Park, Meenoi, Jannabi | |
| 2 | May 21, 2023 | Kim Feel, Parc Jae-jung, (G)I-dle, Lee Mu-jin, Surl (설) | |
No broadcast on May 28 due to replacement of broadcast with My Little Hero.
| 3 | June 2, 2023 | Zior Park, Yang Hee-eun, MeloMance, Sunwoo Jung-a, Band Nah | |
| 4 | June 9, 2023 | Paul Kim, Rooftop Moonlight, Short Box, Lee Seung-yoon | |
| 5 | June 16, 2023 | Tei, DinDin, Choi Jung-in, Car, the Garden, Choi Yu-ree | |
| 6 | June 23, 2023 | Jo Hyun-ah (Urban Zakapa), Wet Boy, Jungyup, Roy Kim, Penomeco, Yang Dong-geun | |
| 7 | June 30, 2023 | UV, Yoo Byung-jae, Jonathan Yiombi, Stella Jang, Yoo Jun-sang, No Brain, Kim Gun-woo | |
| 8 | July 7, 2023 | Jung Seung-hwan, Kim Seo-hyung, Park Ki-young, Silica Gel | |
| 9 | July 14, 2023 | Beenzino, Daybreak, Hyolyn, Paul Blanco, EXO | |
| 10 | July 21, 2023 | Kang Min-kyung, Kim Wan-sun, The Imitation Label, Baek A | |
| 11 | July 28, 2023 | Se So Neon, Go Ah-sung, Oh My Girl | |
| 12 | August 4, 2023 | Kwak Jin-eon, Noel, Kim Pureum, Itzy | |
| 13 | August 11, 2023 | Touched, Nell, Kim Hieora, 10 cm, Dasutt (다섯), YB | |
| 14 | August 18, 2023 | Crying Nut, Jeong Mae and Kung Chi Tachi, Jannabi, Han Ji-min, Joo Woo-jae, Parc Jae-jung | |

Viewership

Average TV viewership ratings (audience share) In the ratings below, the blue numbers represent the lowest ratings and the red numbers represent the highest ratings.
| Ep. no. overall | Ep. no. in season | Original broadcast date | Nationwide (Nielsen Korea) |
|---|---|---|---|
| 13 | 1 | May 14, 2023 | 0.8% |
| 14 | 2 | May 21, 2023 | 0.7% |
| 15 | 3 | June 2, 2023 | 1.0% |
| 16 | 4 | June 9, 2023 | 0.9% |
| 17 | 5 | June 16, 2023 | 1.3% |
| 18 | 6 | June 23, 2023 | 1.3% |
| 19 | 7 | June 30, 2023 | 1.2% |
| 20 | 8 | July 7, 2023 | 1.1% |
| 21 | 9 | July 14, 2023 | 1.0% |
| 22 | 10 | July 21, 2023 | 1.2% |
| 23 | 11 | July 28, 2023 | 1.3% |
| 24 | 12 | August 4, 2023 | 1.0% |
| 25 | 13 | August 11, 2023 | 0.9% |
| 26 | 14 | August 18, 2023 | 1.4% |
| Average | | | 1.08% |

=== III. The Seasons: Long Day, Long Night with AKMU ===
Sibling duo AKMU, served as the project's third host with their show titled The Seasons: Long Day, Long Night with AKMU (악뮤의 오날오밤; Angmyuui onarobam), in correlation to their hit single, "Last Goodbye" (2017). Lee Chan-hyuk and Lee Su-hyun became the broadcast channel's youngest emcees for a late night talk show, and first to host one as a duo. It presented a segment called "Re:Wake Project 2," where they focus on new singers, giving them a chance to be noticed by the public. The installment garnered the most viewers on Wavve throughout the program's history as of April 25, 2024.

Episodes

| Ep. | Broadcast date | Guest(s) | Ref. |
|---|---|---|---|
| 1 | September 1, 2023 | Lee Juck, Lee Sung-kyung, 250, Bibi, AKMU | |
| 2 | September 8, 2023 | Hwasa (Mamamoo), Shin Se-hwi, Kim Se-jeong, H1-Key, Young K (Day6) | |
| 3 | September 15, 2023 | Jung Yong-hwa (CNBLUE), Kim Soo-chul, Rothy, Lee Jin-ah | |
| 4 | September 22, 2023 | Jinusean, D.O. (EXO), o3ohn, An Shin-ae (The Barberettes) | |
No broadcast on September 29 due to live coverage of the 2022 Asian Games
| 5 | October 6, 2023 | Ha Dong-kyun (Wanted), Shin Sung-rok, Sion, Sole (singer) | |
| 6 | October 13, 2023 | Lee Seok-hoon (SG Wannabe), Wheein (Mamamoo), Lee Yeon, Tomorrow X Together | |
| 7 | October 20, 2023 | Lee Hyori, Choi Jung-hoon (Jannabi), Kang Seung-wan, Choi Yu-ree, Loco, Woo Won-jae | |
| 8 | October 27, 2023 | Jessi, Sunmi, Yoo Hwe-seung (N.Flying), Le Sserafim | |
| 9 | November 3, 2023 | Jeon In-kwon, Lyn, Minnie ((G)I-dle), Taemin (Shinee) | |
| 10 | November 10, 2023 | Epik High, Bang Ye-dam, Hynn, Sumin | |
| 11 | November 17, 2023 | Gummy, Crush, Chuu, Hoody | |
No broadcast on November 24 due to the Blue Dragon Film Awards
| 12 | December 1, 2023 | Davichi, Lee Sang-yi, Meenoi, Big Naughty, Gist | |
| 13 | December 8, 2023 | Park Jin-young, Zion.T, Heize, 10 cm, Yoo Seung-woo | |
No broadcast on December 15 due to the 2023 Music Bank Global Festival
| 14 | December 22, 2023 | UV, Yim Si-wan, Lee Sun-bin, Jang Yoon-ju, Yoon Ji-sung, Yoon Seul-ki, Sunwoo Jung-a, Kim Min-seok (MeloMance), AKMU | |

Viewership

Average TV viewership ratings (audience share) In the ratings below, the blue numbers represent the lowest ratings and the red numbers represent the highest ratings.
| Ep. no. overall | Ep. no. in season | Original broadcast date | Nationwide (Nielsen Korea) |
|---|---|---|---|
| 27 | 1 | September 1, 2023 | 1.6% |
| 28 | 2 | September 8, 2023 | 1.8% |
| 29 | 3 | September 15, 2023 | 1.9% |
| 30 | 4 | September 22, 2023 | 1.9% |
| 31 | 5 | October 6, 2023 | 1.2% (Note: Initially broadcast at 22:00 (KST), the airing of the episode was abruptly delayed by one hour due to the broadcasting of the 2022 Asian Games. The episode went on air at 23:00 (KST).) |
| 32 | 6 | October 13, 2023 | 1.8% |
| 33 | 7 | October 20, 2023 | 1.4% |
| 34 | 8 | October 27, 2023 | 0.9% |
| 35 | 9 | November 3, 2023 | 1.1% |
| 36 | 10 | November 10, 2023 | 0.4% (Note: Initially broadcast at 23:20 (KST), the episode was delayed by two hours without prior notice due to the broadcasting of the 2023 Korean Series. The episode went on air at 25:20 (KST).) |
| 37 | 11 | November 16, 2023 | 0.9% |
| 38 | 12 | December 1, 2023 | 1.0% |
| 39 | 13 | December 8, 2023 | 1.0% |
| 40 | 14 | December 22, 2023 | 0.8% |
| Average | | | 1.26% |

=== IV. The Seasons: Lee Hyo-ri's Red Carpet ===
Its fourth installation was presented by Lee Hyori; titled The Seasons: Lee Hyo-ri's Red Carpet (이효리의 레드카펫; I Hyoriui redeukapet). The installment had the longest viewing time, which was 28% longer than the average viewing time for other seasons.

Episodes

| Ep. | Broadcast date | Guest(s) | Ref. |
|---|---|---|---|
| 1 | January 5, 2024 | Bebe, Lee Chan-hyuk (AKMU), Shin Dong-yup, Jennie (Blackpink), Lee Jung-eun | |
| 2 | January 12, 2024 | Younha, Riize, Kim Feel, Silica Gel | |
| 3 | January 19, 2024 | Han Young-ae, Sistar19, B1A4, Woodz | |
| 4 | January 26, 2024 | Defconn, Itzy, Hui, Youra | |
| 5 | February 2, 2024 | Park Myung-soo, Lee Jung-ha, Kim Min-seok (MeloMance), (G)I-dle | |
| 6 | February 9, 2024 | Roy Kim, Parc Jae-jung, Chen (EXO), Hynn, Hyolyn, RalRal, Kim Ho-young, Lee Ji-hye, Vromance, Shin Yong-jae, Kim Na-young, Lee Young-hyun (Big Mama), Park Min-hye (Big Mama), Park Ki-young | |
| 7 | February 16, 2024 | Kim Bum-soo, Wave to Earth, Cho Kyu-hyun, Kim Go-eun | |
| 8 | February 23, 2024 | Uhm Jung-hwa, Enhypen, Le Sserafim, Cha Eun-woo | |
| 9 | March 1, 2024 | Byul, Heo Hoy-kyung, Key (Shinee), Ten (NCT), Lee Yi-kyung | |
| 10 | March 8, 2024 | Jung Jae-hyung, Lee Eun-ji, SG Wannabe, Swings | |
| 11 | March 15, 2024 | Rooftop Moonlight, Chungha, Bolbbalgan4, Highlight | |
| 12 | March 22, 2024 | Day6, Kim Pil-sun, Yoo Yeon-seok, Baek Ji-young | |
| 13 | March 29, 2024 | Jung Mi-jo, Jay Park, Choi Jung-hoon, AKMU | |

Viewership

Average TV viewership ratings (audience share) In the ratings below, the blue numbers represent the lowest ratings and the red numbers represent the highest ratings.
| Ep. no. overall | Ep. no. in season | Original broadcast date | Nationwide (Nielsen Korea) |
|---|---|---|---|
| 41 | 1 | January 5, 2024 | 1.9% |
| 42 | 2 | January 12, 2024 | 1.0% |
| 43 | 3 | January 19, 2024 | 1.2% |
| 44 | 4 | January 26, 2024 | 0.8% |
| 45 | 5 | February 2, 2024 | 1.7% |
| 46 | 6 | February 9, 2024 | 1.7% |
| 47 | 7 | February 16, 2024 | 1.4% |
| 48 | 8 | February 23, 2024 | 1.5% |
| 49 | 9 | March 1, 2024 | 1.3% |
| 50 | 10 | March 8, 2024 | 1.2% |
| 51 | 11 | March 15, 2024 | 1.3% |
| 52 | 12 | March 22, 2024 | 1.2% |
| 53 | 13 | March 29, 2024 | 1.5% |
| Average | | | 1.36% |

=== V. The Seasons: Zico's Artist ===
The project was announced to be renewed for a fifth season, with its host confirmed to be Zico of boy group Block B, and is titled The Seasons: Zico's Artist (지코의 아티스트; Jikoui atiseuteu), with the title named after Zico's single, "Artist" (2017).

Episodes

| Ep. | Broadcast date | Guest(s) | Ref. |
|---|---|---|---|
| 1 | April 26, 2024 | Choi Baek-ho, Crush, Dynamic Duo, Kiss of Life, Rain, Lee Yong-jin | |
| 2 | May 3, 2024 | Kim Yoon-ah, Doyoung (NCT), Gong Myung, 10 cm, Lee Mu-jin | |
| 3 | May 10, 2024 | D.O. (EXO), Yook Sung-jae (BtoB), Giriboy, Wonstein, Stella Jang | |
| 4 | May 17, 2024 | Bada, Teo Yoo, Solar, Choi Yu-ree, Hwang Je-seong | |
| 5 | May 24, 2024 | JD1, HYB, BoyNextDoor, Hwang Je-seong | |
| 6 | May 31, 2024 | Park Bo-gum, Suzy, Zerobaseone, Peppertones | |
| 7 | June 7, 2024 | Go Young Bae, Kim Jung-min, Kim Kyung-ho, Suho (EXO) | |
| 8 | June 14, 2024 | Lee Seung-chul, Sunmi, Go Kyung-pyo, Chen (EXO) | |
| 9 | June 21, 2024 | Billie Eilish, Kwon Eun-bi, Hanroro, H1-Key | |
| 10 | June 28, 2024 | Chuu, K.Will, N.Flying, TWS | |
| 11 | July 5, 2024 | Lee Young-ji, An Shin-ae, Onewe, Hwang Je-seong | |
| 12 | July 12, 2024 | (G)I-dle, Ben, Lee Seung-yoon, Hwang Je-seong | |
| 13 | July 26, 2024 | F.T. Island, NCT 127, The Quiett, Hwang Je-seong | |
| 14 | August 16, 2024 | Onew (Shinee), Jeon Somi, George, Bong Tae-gyu, Hwang Je-seong | |
| 15 | August 23, 2024 | Hyolyn, Nmixx, Skull & Haha, Christopher, Taemin, Jo Jung-suk | |
| 16 | August 30, 2024 | Oh My Girl, So soo bin, Lee Jae-wook | |
| 17 | September 6, 2024 | Block B, Jang Pil-soon, Hwang Je-seong, Standard Friends | |

Viewership

Average TV viewership ratings (audience share) In the ratings below, the blue numbers represent the lowest ratings and the red numbers represent the highest ratings.
| Ep. no. overall | Ep. no. in season | Original broadcast date | Nationwide (Nielsen Korea) |
|---|---|---|---|
| 54 | 1 | April 26, 2024 | 1.1% |
| 55 | 2 | May 3, 2024 | 1.0% |
| 56 | 3 | May 10, 2024 | 0.5% |
| 57 | 4 | May 17, 2024 | 0.3% |
| 58 | 5 | May 24, 2024 | 0.9% |
| 59 | 6 | May 31, 2024 | 0.9% |
| 60 | 7 | June 7, 2024 | 0.9% |
| 61 | 8 | June 14, 2024 | 0.8% |
| 62 | 9 | June 21, 2024 | 0.7% |
| 63 | 10 | June 28, 2024 | 0.7% |
| 64 | 11 | July 5, 2024 | 0.8% |
| 65 | 12 | July 12, 2024 | 0.8% |
| 66 | 13 | July 26, 2024 | 0.9% |
| 67 | 14 | August 16, 2024 | 0.8% |
| 68 | 15 | August 23, 2024 | 1.1% |
| 69 | 16 | August 30, 2024 | 1.0% |
| 70 | 17 | September 6, 2024 | 0.8% |
| Average | | | 0.82% |

=== VI. The Seasons: Lee Young-ji's Rainbow ===
In its sixth season, the show would be fronted by the program's youngest host, Lee Young-ji, and is titled The Seasons: Lee Young-ji's Rainbow (이영지의 레인보우; I Yeongjiui reinbou).

Episodes

| Ep. | Broadcast date | Guest(s) | Ref. |
|---|---|---|---|
| 1 | September 27, 2024 | Hwasa (Mamamoo), Lee Eun-ji, Chang Kiha, Kim Yon-ja | |
| 2 | October 4, 2024 | Lee Juck, Lee Chang-sub (BtoB), Mimi (Oh My Girl), An Yu-jin (Ive), Nerd Connection | |
| 3 | October 11, 2024 | Jay Park, Park Jeong-min, Key (SHINee), Park Ki-young | |
| 4 | October 18, 2024 | Yoon Do-hyun, Kim Ho-young, Kim Hyeong-pyo, Kim Hyun-joo, CNBLUE | |
| 5 | October 25, 2024 | Sunwoo Jung-a, Kim Seung-joo, Roy Kim, JD1 | |
| 6 | November 1, 2024 | Jukjae, Nov, John Park, Aespa | |
| 7 | November 8, 2024 | Tomorrow X Together, Touched, Minho (SHINee), Yoo Byung-jae, UV, Jonathan Yiombi | |
| 8 | November 15, 2024 | LANY, Viviz, Kik5o, Koyote, 2AM | |
| 9 | November 22, 2024 | Ateez, EJel, Lee Dong-hwi, Crush | |
| 10 | November 29, 2024 | Soran, Rosé (Blackpink), Kyuhyun (Super Junior), Yang Da-il | |
| 11 | December 6, 2024 | Ha Hyun-sang, MRCH, Lee Yi-kyung, Twice | |
| 12 | December 13, 2024 | Daybreak, Kuonechan, Baek Ji-young, WayV | |
| 13 | December 27, 2024 | Baekhyun (Exo), Choi Yu-ree, 10cm, Ko Young-bae, Roy Kim, Sunwoo Jung-a, An Shin-ae, Yang Hee-eun, Ko Kyung-pyo, 2AM, John Park, Stella Jang, Kim Min-seok, Insooni | |
| 14 | January 10, 2025 | GFriend, Kassy, Song Joong-ki, BSS | |
| 15 | January 17, 2025 | Choi Jung-in, Ra.D, Gummy, Dynamic Duo, Lee Young-hyun, Xdinary Heroes | |
| 16 | January 24, 2025 | DickPunks, Jamie, Minnie (I-dle), Kim Wan-sun, Seulgi (Red Velvet) | |
| 17 | January 31, 2025 | BB Girls, Boramiyu, Paul Kim, Eunhyuk (Super Junior) | |
| 18 | February 7, 2025 | Ive, YdBB, Kim Min-ha, Jung Seung-hwan | |
| 19 | February 14, 2025 | Wheein (Mamamoo), Chung Ha, Isaac Hong, The Shepherd Bois | |
| 20 | February 21, 2025 | YB, The Volunteers, Na Yeong-seok, pH-1 | |

Viewership

Average TV viewership ratings (audience share) In the ratings below, the blue numbers represent the lowest ratings and the red numbers represent the highest ratings.
| Ep. no. overall | Ep. no. in season | Original broadcast date | Nationwide (Nielsen Korea) |
|---|---|---|---|
| 71 | 1 | September 27, 2024 | 1.1% |
| 72 | 2 | October 4, 2024 | 1.0% |
| 73 | 3 | October 11, 2024 | 0.9% |
| 74 | 4 | October 18, 2024 | 0.8% |
| 75 | 5 | October 25, 2024 | 0.7% |
| 76 | 6 | November 1, 2024 | 0.9% |
| 77 | 7 | November 8, 2024 | 0.7% |
| 78 | 8 | November 15, 2024 | |
| 79 | 9 | November 22, 2024 | |
| 80 | 10 | November 29, 2024 | |
| 81 | 11 | December 6, 2024 | |
| 82 | 12 | December 13, 2024 | |
| 83 | 13 | January 10, 2025 | |
| 84 | 14 | January 17, 2025 | |
| 85 | 15 | January 24, 2025 | |
| 86 | 16 | January 31, 2025 | |
| 87 | 17 | February 7, 2025 | |
| 88 | 18 | February 14, 2025 | |
| 89 | 19 | February 21, 2025 | |

=== VII. The Seasons: Park Bo-gum's Cantabile ===
The seventh season was hosted by Park Bo-gum entitled The Seasons: Park Bo-gum's Cantabile (박보검의 칸타빌레; Bak Bogeomui kantabille), and is the first actor to host the show. It premiered on March 14, 2025 on KBS2 and aired every Friday at 22:00 / 23:20 (KST) for 21 episodes until August 1, 2025. Park received positive reviews from both critics and audience and won him several accolades including Best Entertainer at the 52nd Korea Broadcasting Prizes and Entertainer of the Year at the 2025 KBS Entertainment Awards.

Episodes
Viewership

=== VIII. The Seasons: 10cm's Pat-Pat ===
In its eighth season, the show is hosted by singer-songwriter 10cm, real name Kwon Jung-yeol, with the Korean title The Seasons: 10cm's Sseudam Sseudam (10CM의 쓰담쓰담; 10CMui sseudamsseudam), named after 10cm's single "Sseudam Sseudam" (2014), and with the English title The Seasons: 10cm's Pat-Pat. It premiered on September 5, 2025 at 22:00 (KST), and ended on March 6, 2026. With 25 episodes hosted, he is the longest serving host of the series.

Episodes
Viewership

=== IX. The Seasons: Sung Si-kyung's Ear Candy ===
The ninth season will be hosted by singer and entertainer Sung Si-kyung, with the Korean title The Seasons: Sung Si-kyung's Eardrum Boyfriend (성시경의 고막남친; seongsigyeongui gomangnamchin), and with the English title The Seasons: Sung Si-kyung's Ear Candy. The season premiered on March 27, 2026 at 22:00 (KST).

== Awards and nominations ==
Name of the award ceremony, year presented, category, nominee of the award, and the result of the nomination
| Award ceremony | Year | Category | Nominee / Work | Result | Ref. |
|---|---|---|---|---|---|
| Brand of the Year Awards | 2025 | Best Multi-Entertainer | Park Bo-gum | Won | |
| Fundex Awards | 2025 | Best Player in a Seasonal or Mini TV Show | Park Bo-gum | Nominated | |
| KBS Entertainment Awards | 2023 | Excellence Award in Show and Variety | Choi Jung-hoon | Won | |
| KBS Entertainment Awards | 2023 | Rookie Award | AKMU | Nominated | |
| KBS Entertainment Awards | 2025 | Grand Prize (Daesang) | Park Bo-gum | Nominated | |
| KBS Entertainment Awards | 2025 | Entertainer of the Year | Park Bo-gum | Won | |
| KBS Entertainment Awards | 2025 | Rookie Award | 10 cm | Won | |
| 52nd Korea Broadcasting Prizes | 2025 | Best Entertainer | Park Bo-gum | Won | |
| 303rd Korean PD Association's Award of the Month | 2025 | Best TV/Entertainment | The Seasons: Park Bo-gum's Cantabile | Won | |
