= Top Banana =

Top Banana, a colloquial term for a boss or leader, may refer to:

- Top Banana (video game), a 1991 platform game
- "Top Banana" (Arrested Development), a 2003 television episode
- Top Banana (musical), a 1951 Broadway play with comedian Phil Silvers
  - Top Banana (film), a 1954 adaptation of the play
- Top Banana, a custom car and a winner of the 1969 Ridler Award at the Detroit Autorama
- Top Banana, a Hi-Impact Paint color offered by Dodge introduced in 1970.
- Top Banana, a 1996 novel by Bill James
- Top Banana, a 1990–1992 children's series aired during the TV-am programme Hey, Hey, It's Saturday!

== See also ==
- Big Cheese (disambiguation)
