= The Seasons: Park Bo-gum's Cantabile =

Seventh season of the KBS music talk show

- Promotional poster
- Starring: Park Bo-gum
- No. of episodes: 21

Release
- Original network: KBS2
- Original release: March 14 – August 1, 2025

Season chronology
- ← Previous; The Seasons: Lee Young-ji's Rainbow Next → The Seasons: 10cm's Pat-Pat

The Seasons: Park Bo-gum's Cantabile (Korean: 박보검의 칸타빌레) is the seventh season of the South Korean late-night music talk show The Seasons hosted by Park Bo-gum. It premiered on March 14, 2025, on KBS2 and aired every Friday at 22:00 / 23:20 (KST) for 21 episodes until August 1, 2025. Park received positive reviews from both critics and audience and won him several accolades including Best Entertainer at the 52nd Korea Broadcasting Prizes and Entertainer of the Year at the 23rd KBS Entertainment Awards.

== Background ==
Park Bo-gum is the first actor to host The Seasons which includes in-depth interviews and live performances from musicians and entertainers. He personally picked the title "cantabile" which means "as if singing" as he hoped that his season "will leave viewers with gentle comfort and a warm aftertaste" like a song.

== Episodes ==
| Episode number overall | Episode in season | Original broadcast date | Guest(s) | Ref. |
|---|---|---|---|---|
| 90 | 1 | March 14, 2025 | Noh Young-shim, Sunwoo Jungah, Jung Jin-young, Kwak Dong-yeon, Kim You-jung, Lee Young-ji, Jeong Jun-il, Hoshi x Woozi, Stardust | |
| 91 | 2 | March 21, 2025 | Kwak Jin-eon, Lee Seung-yoon, Jo Nam Ji Dae, Dragon Pony | |
| 92 | 3 | March 28, 2025 | Rooftop Moonlight, NMIXX, Lily, Haewon, Jo Hyun-ah, Seo In-guk | |
| 93 | 4 | April 4, 2025 | Song So-hee, Stella Jang, Roy Kim, WING, Beatpella House | |
| 94 | 5 | April 11, 2025 | Yoon Jong-shin, Daesung, NouerA, Yooseop, Jeong Ma-e, Kung Chi Tachi | |
| 95 | 6 | April 18, 2025 | Lee Seung-cheol, Cha Ji-yeon, Park Eun-tae, Dindin, CHEEZE | |
| 96 | 7 | April 25, 2025 | LUCY, Jung Eun-ji, Lee Jun-young, Melomance, TWS | |
| 97 | 8 | May 2, 2025 | Kwon Jin-ah, Sarah Kang, Jannabi, Meovv | |
| 98 | 9 | May 9, 2025 | Jo Sung-mo, Cherry Filter, Bae Ki-sung, Tim, Yoon Sang, Kim Hyun-hul, Lee Hyun-woo, Mingyu, As One | |
| 99 | 10 | May 16, 2025 | Jeong Seung-hwan, BIBI, OWALLOIL, BoyNextDoor | |
| 100 | 11 | May 23, 2025 | Baekhyun, I-dle, Daybreak, Sanmanhan | |
| 101 | 12 | May 30, 2025 | Peppertones, Jo Hye-ryun, Heo Seong-tae, Lee Sang-yi | |
| 102 | 13 | June 6, 2025 | N.Flying, So Soo-bin, Enhypen, Milena | |
| 103 | 14 | June 13, 2025 | Yuki Kuramoto, Kim Yu-na, Choi Yu-ree, Shin In-ryu, Kiss of Life | |
| 104 | 15 | June 20, 2025 | Sam Kim, O3ohn, Car, the Garden, Cho Chung-mi, UINONE | |
| 105 | 16 | June 27, 2025 | Lee Sang-soon, Jeong Su-min, Bobby Kim, Kim Na-young | |
| 106 | 17 | July 4, 2025 | Haha, Joo Woo-jae, Kim Joon-hyun, Hanhae, Moon Se-yoon, Yang Se-hyung, Yang Se-chan, Park Soo-hong, Park Kyung-lim | |
| 107 | 18 | July 11, 2025 | Jung Yong-hwa, g0nny, Ahn Hyo-seop, HITGS | |
| 108 | 19 | July 18, 2025 | Super Junior, Sunwoo Jung-a, Paul Blanco, Ji Sokuri Club | |
| 109 | 20 | July 25, 2025 | 10cm, Maria Kim, Ha Hyun-sang, Baby Don't Cry, Hyun Lee | |
| 110 | 21 | August 1, 2025 | Kim Bum-soo, Zion.T, IU, Let Me Fly cast | |

== Release ==
Aside from Wavve which streamed the previous seasons of the show, Cantabile also streams on TVING in South Korea. Globally, it aired on KBS World and streams on Kocowa and Viki.

== Media ==
The live recording of Enhypen's cover of the song "Demons" by Imagine Dragons, which they performed on the show, was released to various music streaming platforms on May 13, 2025. The following week, Cantabile released the live recording of Lee Jun-young's performance of "If It Were Me" on the show, with piano accompaniment by host Park Bo-gum, as a digital single. On June 27, 2025, the show released the live recording of Soyeon's (I-dle) cover of QWER's "My Name Is Malgeum". By popular demand, host Park Bo-gum released the live recording of his performance of "Uphill Road (ft. Yoon Jong-shin)" as a digital single on August 1, 2025.

== Reception ==
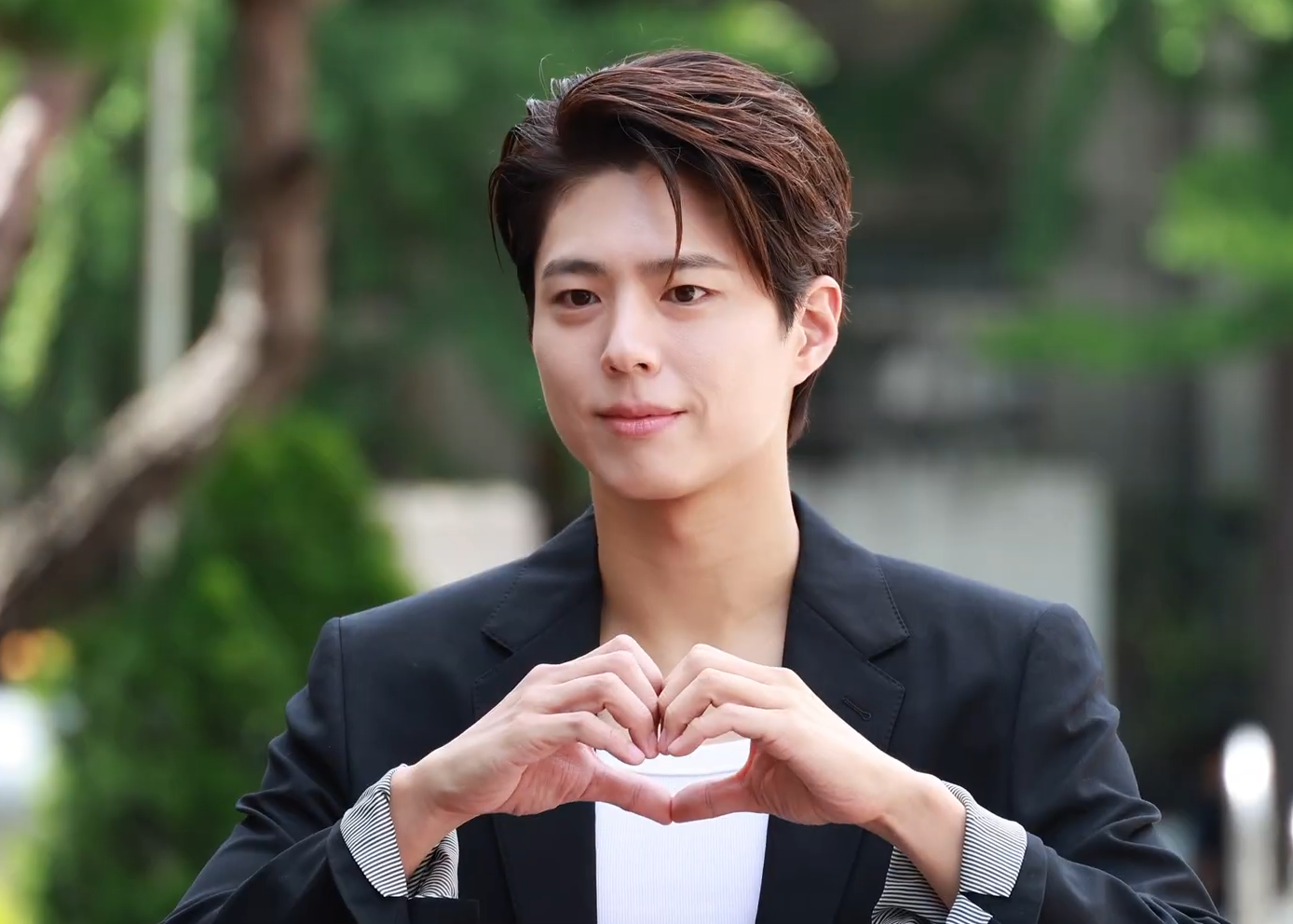
Host Park Bo-gum on his way to film the show, July 2025

The show received positive reviews and Park Bo-gum was praised by critics and audience alike for his musical knowledge, hosting, singing, and piano-playing skills. Entertainment writer Kang Joo-hee of Ilgan Sports commented that Park's "humility and consideration for his guests, his listening and empathizing attitude, his increasingly skilled hosting skills, and his sense of humor, has become a role model for all".

Park was a popular host with fans and media gathering outside KBS headquarters in Yeoui-dong, Seoul every week to witness him arriving for filming. For the premiere episode, more than 20,000 people applied for tickets to attend the live show. Hankook Ilbo reported that Park received support from middle-aged and older female viewers with the recording audience consisting mostly of female fans in their 40s and 50s. The broadcast also showed remarkable growth in terms of advertising orders compared to previous seasons. Per big data analytics firm Good Data Corporation, Park ranked first in the list of "Most Buzzworthy Performers" (TV and OTT; Entertainment) during the show's finale week, with the show ranking fifth in topicality among entertainment programs on television.

=== Viewership ===
| Episode number overall | Episode in season | Original broadcast date | Average audience share |
| Episode number overall | Episode in season | Original broadcast date | Nationwide (Nielsen Korea) |
Aired at 22:00 (KST)
| 90 | 1 | March 14, 2025 | 1.5% |
| 91 | 2 | March 21, 2025 | 1.0% |
| 92 | 3 | March 28, 2025 | 0.9% |
| 93 | 4 | April 4, 2025 | 1.1% |
| 94 | 5 | April 11, 2025 | 1.2% |
| 95 | 6 | April 18, 2025 | 1.6% |
| 96 | 7 | April 25, 2025 | 1.4% |
| 97 | 8 | May 2, 2025 | 1.0% |
| 98 | 9 | May 9, 2025 | 1.3% |
Aired at 23:20 (KST)
| 99 | 10 | May 16, 2025 | 0.5% |
| 100 | 11 | May 23, 2025 | 0.7% |
| 101 | 12 | May 30, 2025 | 0.6% |
| 102 | 13 | June 6, 2025 | 0.5% |
| 103 | 14 | June 13, 2025 | 0.5% |
| 104 | 15 | June 20, 2025 | 0.5% |
| 105 | 16 | June 27, 2025 | 0.6% |
| 106 | 17 | July 4, 2025 | 0.9% |
| 107 | 18 | July 11, 2025 | 0.6% |
| 108 | 19 | July 18, 2025 | 1.0% |
| 109 | 20 | July 27, 2025 | 0.4% |
| 110 | 21 | August 1, 2025 | 1.1% |
| Average | | | 0.876% |

== Accolades ==
Name of the award ceremony, year presented, category, nominee of the award, and the result of the nomination
| Award ceremony | Year | Category | Nominee | Result | Ref. |
|---|---|---|---|---|---|
| Brand of the Year Awards | 2025 | Best Multi-Entertainer | Park Bo-gum | Won | |
| Fundex Awards | 2025 | Best Player in a Seasonal or Mini TV Show | Park Bo-gum | Nominated | |
| KBS Entertainment Awards | 2025 | Grand Prize (Daesang) | Park Bo-gum | Nominated | |
| KBS Entertainment Awards | 2025 | Entertainer of the Year | Park Bo-gum | Won | |
| 52nd Korea Broadcasting Prizes | 2025 | Best Entertainer | Park Bo-gum | Won | |
| 303rd Korean PD Association's Award of the Month | 2025 | Best TV/Entertainment | The Seasons: Park Bo-gum's Cantabile | Won | |

== See also ==
- The Seasons
- Park Bo-gum filmography
- Park Bo-gum discography
