= Cheesy =

Cheesy may refer to:

== Art, entertainment, and media ==
- Cheesy (album), a 1993 album by En Esch
- Cheesy (video game), a 1996 game for PlayStation
- Cheesy Home Video, a 1992 video by Primus

== Food ==
- Cheese, a food derived from milk that is produced in a wide range of flavors, textures and forms
- Cheesy Peas, a fictitious food from The Fast Show

== Style ==
- Camp (style)
- Kitsch

== See also ==
- Cheese (disambiguation)
- Cheezies, brand of cheese curl snack food
- Cheez Doodles, a cheese-flavored cornmeal puff
