= Cheese It =

Cheese It may refer to:

- Cheese It (film), 1926 Krazy Kat film
- Cheese It, the Cat!, a 1957 Warner Bros. cartoon
- Cheez-It, a cheese cracker
