= Seo Bok =

2021 South Korean sci-fi action film

- Release poster
- Hangul: 서복
- Hanja: 徐福
- RR: Seo Bok
- MR: Sŏ Pok
- Directed by: Lee Yong-ju
- Written by: Lee Yong-ju
- Starring: Gong Yoo; Park Bo-gum
- Cinematography: Lee Mo-gae
- Edited by: Kim Sang-bum
- Music by: Jo Yeong-wook
- Production companies: Studio 101; CJ Entertainment
- Distributed by: CJ Entertainment
- Release date: April 15, 2021
- Running time: 114 minutes
- Country: South Korea
- Language: Korean
- Budget: ₩16 billion
- Box office: US$6.8 million (Note: Seo Bok was released simultaneously in theaters and the streaming platform TVING. Any revenue from online release is not factored into box office grosses.)

Seo Bok (Korean: 서복), also known as Seo Bok: Project Clone, is a 2021 South Korean science fiction action thriller film written and directed by Lee Yong-ju. It stars Park Bo-gum as the title character, and Gong Yoo as a former intelligence agent. It was initially slated for a December 2020 release, however, its launch was postponed due to the COVID-19 pandemic. The film, which was pre-sold to 56 countries ahead of its launch, was eventually released simultaneously in theaters in South Korea and several Asian countries, as well as via streaming media TVING on April 15, 2021. It is the first Korean film released simultaneously in theaters and over-the-top media service.

The film received generally favorable reviews from critics, with Park's performance as a human clone gaining critical acclaim. He won Best New Actor at the 41st Golden Cinematography Awards for the role.

== Plot ==
Former agent Gi-heon (Gong Yoo), who has been living in isolation due to a traumatic past event, receives an offer he cannot refuse from the intelligence agency. His mission is to safely transport an experimental subject named Seo Bok (Park Bo-gum), created through stem cell cloning and genetic engineering. However, as soon as the mission begins, they face an unexpected attack. Barely escaping, Gi-heon and Seo Bok embark on a unique journey together.

Seo Bok, experiencing the outside world for the first time, finds everything fascinating, while Gi-heon is eager to complete what he believes to be his final mission. Their clashing perspectives lead to constant friction as they move forward. Meanwhile, multiple groups seeking to claim Seo Bok, who could either be humanity's salvation or its downfall, intensify their pursuit. Eventually, Gi-heon and Seo Bok are forced to make an unavoidable choice.

== Cast ==
- Gong Yoo as Min Gi-heon, a former intelligence agent who is tasked with ensuring the safe transportation of Seo Bok
- Park Bo-gum as Seo Bok, the first human clone
- Jo Woo-jin as Chief Ahn, an agent of the Korea Intelligence Agency
- Park Byung-eun as Shin Hak-seon
- Jang Young-nam as Dr. Im Se-eun, director of the Institute
- Kim Jae-keon as Kim Cheon-oh
- Yeon Je-wook
- Kim Hong-pa
- Lee Eon-jung as Yoon Hyun-soo

== Production ==
=== Development ===
The film was initially developed in January 2017, with Lee Yong-ju directing and also writing the screenplay.

=== Casting ===
The film was formally announced with Park Bo-gum in the role of Seo Bok in January 2017. By October 2018, Gong Yoo was confirmed to appear in the role of an intelligence agent. In April 2019, Jang Young-nam, Jo Woo-jin and Park Byung-eun were cast in supporting roles. Art director Lee Ha-jun joined the production in June 2019. The net production cost was reportedly about ₩16 billion.

=== Filming ===
Principal photography began in May 2019, with filming taking place mainly at the Jeonju film studio located in Jeonju. Location filming took place from mid-June to early August 2019 in Tongyeong. The film ended principal photography in October 2019, after nearly six months of filming.

== Release ==
On October 21, 2020, distributor CJ Entertainment announced the film will be released in December 2020, with a first look of the film and teaser poster released days later. However, its premiere was postponed due to the COVID-19 pandemic. The film pre-sold to 56 countries ahead of its launch and opened simultaneously across several Asian markets alongside its home market, including Hong Kong, Singapore and Taiwan on April 15, 2021 alongside a streaming release on TVING. It is the first time that a Korean film was released theatrically and via over-the-top media service. In Vietnam, the film premiered on iQIYI on April 22, 2021. It premiered on July 16, 2021 in Japan. In the United States and Canada, distributor WellGo USA licensed the film for video on demand to streaming service Viki.

The film was selected to premiere at Brussels International Fantastic Film Festival 2021 held on April 6 to April 18, 2021. Seo Bok was also invited to Fantasia International Film Festival which was held from August 5 to 25, 2021 in Montreal. The film was screened in the Canadian Premiere section on demand.

== Reception ==
=== Box office ===
The film was released on April 15, 2021 in South Korea on 1,382 screens. It topped the South Korean box office in its opening day with 45,155 audiences. It remained at the top of the domestic box office, in its second day of its release with 36,183 admissions. The decrease in the number of audience from first day was attributed to the simultaneous release on streaming media TVING. The film maintained its #1 rank at Korean box office in its third day of release. It was #1 at the end of the opening weekend at domestic box office with a total of 210,210 admissions. In Hong Kong it topped the box office for two straight weekends.

Per Variety, the film was "one of the biggest local films to release in Korea in 2021." According to Korean Film Council data, it ranked 13th place among all the Korean films released in 2021, with a gross of US$3.28 million and a total of 385,409 admissions, as of December 11, 2021.

=== Critical response ===
On the review aggregator website Rotten Tomatoes, 80% of 15 critics' reviews are positive, with an average rating of 7.1/10. According to the Korean review aggregator Naver Movie Database, the film holds an audience approval rating of 8.17.

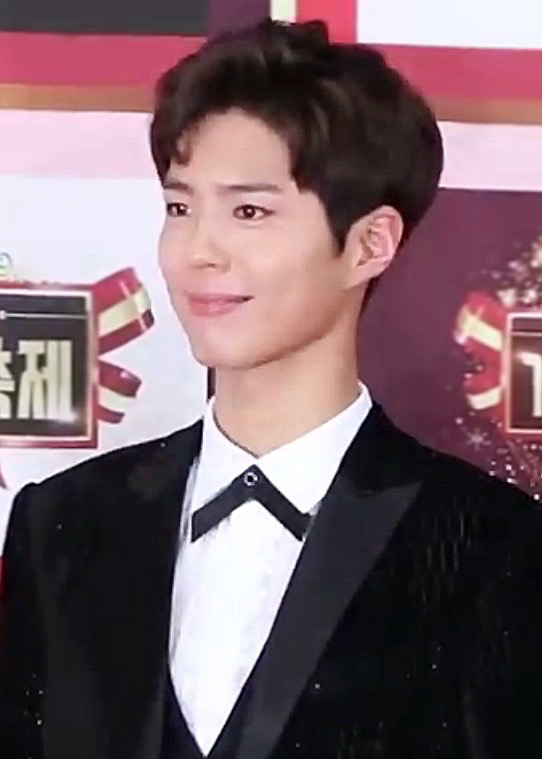
Park Bo-gum's performance in the film was praised by critics

Elisabeth Vintecelli, in her review for The New York Times wrote that director Lee Young-ju focuses on philosophical inquiry and "his slow-burning film casts a genuinely affecting spell" that "becomes increasingly poignant. Don't be surprised if you shed a few tears." In his review of the film, critic Kang Min-kyung of Star News Korea praised Park Bo-gum's performance writing: "[His] transformations are endless...That's why Park is like a piece of paper. It seems like the picture is drawn wherever the hand of the person drawing on the paper goes. It was a look of determination different from the look he showed in the drama Hello Monster. It's hard to imagine Seo Bok without Park. His unique dualistic atmosphere and gaze in Seobok keeps coming to mind and leaves a lasting impression." Bryan Tan, writing for Yahoo! News, rated the film with two and a half stars out of five. Praising the performance of Park, he wrote: "Seeing Park Bo Gum's compelling acting on the silver screen again really warmed the cockles of my heart." Tan concluded the review writing: "the over-the-top psychic CGI displays really got in the way of the bigger questions of how the first ever human clone should find his place in the world, without everyone trying to siphon his DNA for everlasting life." Kim Seong-Hyun reviewing the film for YTN wrote that the predominant question asked by the characters in the film was about life and death. Kim felt that the action in the film was unsatisfactory, but that did not reflect on the performance of the star cast. Concluding the review Kim wrote: "It is difficult to erase the thought that the actors' performance is somewhat regrettable to contain a long and repetitive message."

James Marsh writing for South China Morning Post rated the film with two out of five stars and called it a "... quasi-philosophical melodrama masquerading as a futuristic action thriller". He opined that director Lee Yong-ju in spite of putting all hi-tech thrills and setting a stage for good brainy cinema, could not make it happen. He found the film slow and lengthy and felt that the "violent, effects-heavy climax" was tardy to be enjoyable. Marsh concluded that: "Inevitably it is the all-too-familiar themes of mortality, family and corporate malfeasance that permeate to the surface as Lee defiantly steers his film headlong into a quagmire of ponderous, poorly articulated existential nonsense." Jeanmarie Tan writing for The New Paper rated the film with three stars out of five. She opined that the film touched on the question of philosophical and ethical immortality superficially. Praising the performance of Park she wrote: "[He] was effortless in switching countenance from childlike innocence to bestial rage." Concluding her write up Tan penned: "Watching Seobok, a superbeing with powers of telekinesis, go all Dark Phoenix on his enemies is right up there with any X-Men movie."

=== Accolades ===
Award	Year	Category	Recipient	Result	Ref.
41st Golden Cinematography Awards	2021	Best New Actor	Park Bo-gum	Won	
