= Music Bank World Tour =

South Korean music show

- World tour by various K-pop artists
- Start date: 13 July 2011
- No. of shows: 22

The Music Bank World Tour is a worldwide live concert tour of South Korean music show Music Bank by the Korean Broadcasting System. The tour stages live performances, featuring multiple K-pop acts, in various locations outside of South Korea. Since July 2011, the Music Bank World Tour has been held in multiple cities across Asia, Europe and Latin America with an estimated global live audience of 200,000.

== Overview ==
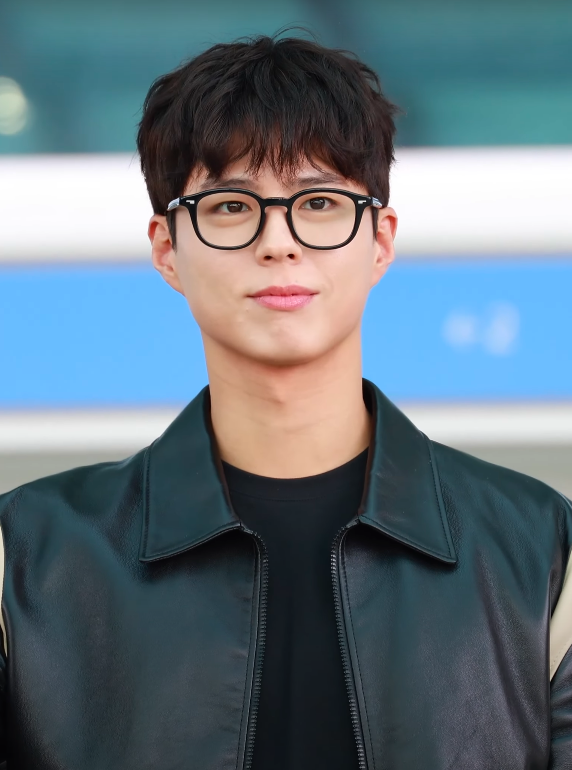
Actor and singer Park Bo-gum, a former host of Music Bank, has hosted the tour nine times as of 2025

Korean Broadcasting System's Music Bank is one of the most popular music programs of South Korea. It is broadcast live on KBS2 domestically since 1998, and is available globally with subtitles on KBS World, including on its official YouTube stream. It is one of the driving forces behind the Korean Wave and has a steady fan base around the world as it remains the most accessible of the major K-pop television shows.

After a two-year hiatus since the 2015 Hanoi show, the tour restarted in 2017 with Singapore and Jakarta as its stops. It was hosted by former Music Bank hosts actor Park Bo-gum and Red Velvet's Irene. As of 2025, Park has hosted the tour nine times.

== Performers ==
City	Country	Performers	Date
2011
Tokyo	Japan	Beast, 2PM, TVXQ, Girls' Generation, Secret, Rainbow, Baek Ji-young, RaNia, Infinite, Kara, 4Minute, U-Kiss, IU, Park Hyun-bin	July 13
2012
Paris	France	U-Kiss, 2PM, Girls' Generation, 4Minute, SHINee, Beast, T-ara, Sistar	February 8
Hong Kong	China	TVXQ, CNBLUE, IU, Beast, f(X), MBLAQ, Infinite, Wonder Girls	June 23
Viña del Mar	Chile	MBLAQ, CNBLUE, After School, Davichi, Super Junior, RaNia	November 2
2013
Jakarta	Indonesia	Super Junior, Beast, Sistar, Teen Top, 2PM, SHINee, Infinite, Eru	March 9
Istanbul	Turkey	FT–Island, Super Junior, Miss A, Beast, Ailee, MBLAQ	September 7
2014
Rio de Janeiro	Brazil	SHINee, B.A.P, MBLAQ, CNBLUE, M.I.B, Infinite, Ailee	June 7
Mexico City	Mexico	Exo-K, Beast, BTS, Ailee, Girl's Day, Infinite, B.A.P	October 30
2015
Hanoi	Vietnam	Teen Top, Block B, Got7, Exo, Apink, SHINee, Sistar	March 28
2017
Singapore		CNBLUE, SHINee, BTS, Red Velvet, Mamamoo	August 8
Jakarta	Indonesia	NCT 127, B.A.P, GFriend, Exo, Astro	September 2
2018
Santiago	Chile	Wanna One, SF9, Twice, VIXX, B.A.P, Taemin	March 23
Berlin	Germany	Exo, Wanna One, (G)I-dle, Stray Kids, Jeon Somi, Taemin	September 15
2019
Hong Kong	China	NU'EST W, Ailee, Twice, Seventeen, Monsta X, FT–Island	January 19
2022
Santiago	Chile	TXT, Ateez, STAYC, NCT Dream, The Boyz, (G)I-dle	November 12
2023
Paris	France	The Boyz, Enhypen, Stray Kids, Nmixx, AB6IX, P1Harmony, Cravity, Mamamoo, Ive	April 8
Mexico City	Mexico	TNX, AB6IX, (G)I-dle, STAYC, NewJeans, Itzy	October 22
2024
Antwerp	Belgium	Oneus, TXT, (G)I-dle, STAYC, ZeroBaseOne, Riize	April 20
Madrid	Spain	Enhypen, Aespa, Kiss of Life, P1Harmony, Nmixx, Riize, BoyNextDoor, Mamamoo+	October 12
2025
Lisbon	Portugal	Ateez, ZeroBaseOne, Riize, Taemin, Ive, Izna	September 27
2026
Barcelona	Spain	Ateez, Enhypen, Nmixx (Note: Haewon, member of Nmixx, did not perform due to a health issue.@nmixxpics_ (September 12, 2026). "Haewon will not be performing" (Tweet) – via X (formerly Twitter).), xikers, NCT Wish, Cortis, Alpha Drive One	September 12
2027
TBA	TBA	TBA	TBA
TBA	TBA	TBA	TBA

== Tour dates ==
Date	City	Country	Venue	Host(s)	Ref.
2011
July 13, 2011	Tokyo	Japan	Tokyo Dome		
2012
February 8, 2012	Paris	France	Bercy		
June 23, 2012	Hong Kong	China	AsiaWorld–Arena		
November 2, 2012	Viña del Mar	Chile	Quinta Vergara	Jung Yong-hwa, Uee, Kyuhyun	
2013
March 9, 2013	Jakarta	Indonesia	Gelora Bung Karno Stadium	Ok Taec-yeon, Kyuhyun, Nadia Mulya, Jeong Ji-won	
September 7, 2013	Istanbul	Turkey	Ülker Sports Arena	Kyuhyun, Bae Suzy, Yoon Doo-joon, Ayşe Süberker	
2014
June 7, 2014	Rio de Janeiro	Brazil	HSBC Arena		
October 30, 2014	Mexico City	Mexico	Mexico City Arena		
2015
March 28, 2015	Hanoi	Vietnam	Mỹ Đình National Stadium		
2017
August 4, 2017	Singapore		Suntec Convention Centre	Park Bo-gum, Irene	
September 2, 2017	Jakarta	Indonesia	Jakarta International Expo	Park Bo-gum, Irene	
2018
March 23, 2018	Santiago	Chile	Movistar Arena	Park Bo-gum, Jeongyeon	
September 15, 2018	Berlin	Germany	Max-Schmeling-Halle	Park Bo-gum, Jeon Somi	
2019
January 19, 2019	Hong Kong	China	AsiaWorld–Arena	Park Bo-gum, Dahyun	
2022
November 12, 2022	Santiago	Chile	Estadio Monumental David Arellano	Rowoon	
2023
April 8, 2023	Paris	France	Paris La Défense Arena	Park Bo-gum	
October 22, 2023	Mexico City	Mexico	Palacio de los Deportes	Park Bo-gum	
2024
April 20, 2024	Antwerp	Belgium	Sportpaleis	Park Bo-gum	
October 12, 2024	Madrid	Spain	Auditorio Miguel Ríos, Rivas-Vaciamadrid	Park Bo-gum	
2025
September 27, 2025	Lisbon	Portugal	MEO Arena	Park Bo-gum	
2026
September 12, 2026	Barcelona	Spain	Estadi Olímpic Lluís Companys	Park Bo-gum	
2027
TBA	TBA	TBA	TBA		
TBA	TBA	TBA	TBA		

== Accolades ==
Name of the award ceremony, year presented, category, nominee of the award, and the result of the nomination
Award ceremony	Year	Category	Nominee	Result	Ref.
KBS Entertainment Awards	2025	Grand Prize (Daesang)	Park Bo-gum	Nominated	
KBS Entertainment Awards	2025	Entertainer of the Year in Show and Variety	Park Bo-gum	Won	

== See also ==
- KBS Song Festival
