= The Cheese =

Lower Hutt; New Zealand
- Broadcast area: Wellington Region
- Frequency: 87.7 MHz

Programming
- Format: Adult contemporary music

Ownership
- Owner: Grant Thoms
- Operator: Brandit Media Limited

History
- Founded: 2006
- First air date: July 1, 2006
- Former frequencies: 88.4 and 87.9 MHz

Technical information
- Licensing authority: Radio Spectrum Management
- Class: LPFM
- Transmitter coordinates: 41.2167°S 174.9167°E

Links
- Webcast: Listen live (via TuneIn)
- Website: www.thecheese.co.nz

The Cheese is a LPFM (Low Power FM) radio station which broadcasts from Lower Hutt, a region close to Wellington in New Zealand. The station broadcasts 24 hours a day. The Cheese is licensed with APRA and PPNZ in New Zealand for music broadcasting rights and operates under the NZ laws governing LPFM transmission.

== History ==
The Cheese commenced broadcasting on Saturday, July 1, 2006, and its original frequency was at 88.4 FM from Wainuiomata.

The station can be heard in Lower Hutt on 87.7 MHz FM with simulcasting via their official website.

== Format ==
The Cheese broadcasts a mix of music from the 80s, 90s, recent and current hits. Their slogan is "Music For Generation-X!".
