= Say cheese =

Common instruction used by photographers to make their subjects smile

"Say 'cheese'" is an English-language instruction used by photographers who want their subject or subjects to smile with their lips apart and teeth showing.

== History ==
In the 19th century, most people were expected to use a neutral facial expression when being photographed. The expensive and time-consuming nature of early photography reinforced this behavior. In the late 19th century, different aesthetic and behavioral norms required keeping the mouth small, which led to photographers using "say prunes". Smiling while being photographed became normal in the 20th century, as the availability of cameras made photography a more common occurrence. Saying particular words was seen to help subjects have a particular smile, with cheese being recorded in 1943 as a word that was said in English. As such, photographers would use the phrase say "cheese" to encourage subjects to state the word while the photographer snapped the photo.

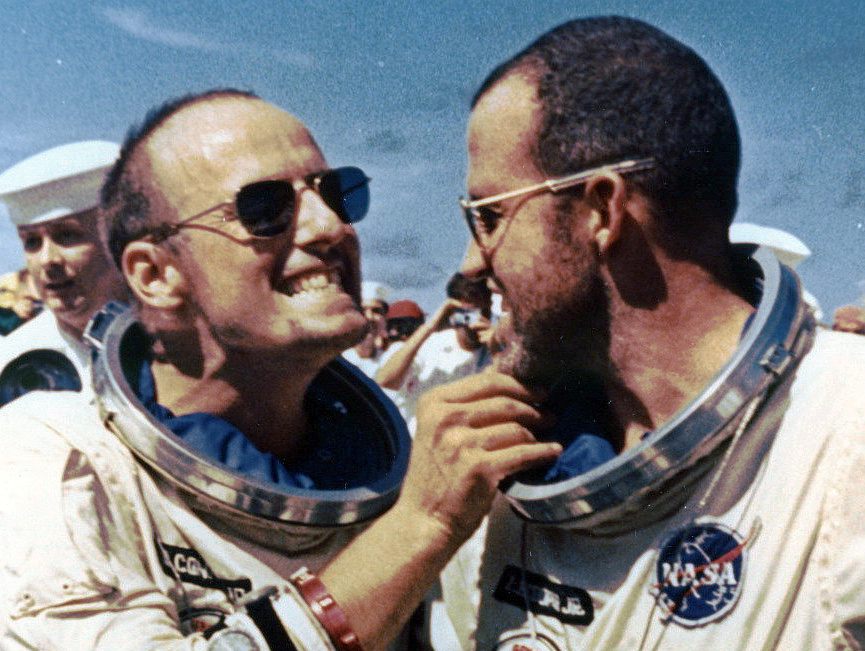
US astronauts Pete Conrad and Gordon Cooper after their safe return to Earth from the Gemini 5 mission in 1965. Pilot Conrad is jokingly instructing his commander Cooper to say cheese to the photographers.

== In different languages and cultures ==
Perhaps because of strong western influence, especially in the realm of photography, and perhaps because of increased numbers of western visitors after photographic equipment became widely available, "Say cheese" has also entered into the Japanese language.

Other languages have adopted this method, albeit with different words, to get the desired effect of shaping the mouth to form a smile.

- Australia: Please!
- Bulgaria: zele (зеле, 'cabbage')
- Brazil: digam 'X' ('say "X"') (the name of the letter 'X' in Portuguese ([ʃis]) sounds a lot like the English word cheese)
- China: 茄子 (qiézi), meaning 'eggplant'. The pronunciation of this word is notably similar to that of the English word cheese. In Hong Kong, the phrase is 一,二,三 (yat yi saam) meaning '1, 2, 3'.
- Croatia: ptičica ('little bird')
- Czech Republic: sýr ('cheese')
- Denmark: appelsin ('orange')
- Estonia: hernesupp ('pea soup')
- Finland: muikku, a species of fish known in English as the vendace
- France and other French-speaking countries: ouistiti ('marmoset')
- Germany: food-related words like Spaghetti, Käsekuchen ('cheesecake'), or Wurst are used, mainly to make children laugh for the picture.
- Hungary: itt repül a kis madár ('here flies the little bird') cheese is also used, mostly by younger people.
- India: paneer (Hindi: पनीर), people also say hari.
- Italy: cheese
- Israel: תגידו צ'יז (tagidu tshiz), meaning 'say "cheese"'.
- Japan: sē, no... ('ready, set..."). Also チーズ (chīzu), meaning 'cheese', is used.
- Most Latin American countries: whiskey ('whiskey', pronounced to end with an ee sound)
- Morocco: khbiz ('bread')
- Netherlands: lach eens naar het vogeltje ('Smile at the little bird'). The English word cheese is also often used.
- Portugal: olha o passarinho ('Look at the little bird')
- Serbia: птичица ('little bird'), which sounds like [ptiˈtʃitsa], pteecheetsa
- South Korea: kimchi
- Spain: di/diga/decid patata ("say 'potato'"). Also, mirar al pajarito ('look at the birdie'), intended to make people look directly at the camera. In other regions, like Catalonia or Valencian Community: "Lluís" ('Lewis').
- Sweden: säg 'omelett' ('say "omelette"')
