= Bernard Cheese =

English painter and printmaker

Bernard Cheese (20 January 1925 – 15 March 2013) was an English painter and printmaker, a fellow of the Royal Society of Painter-Printmakers. His works are found in internationally important collections in the UK and US.

== Early life ==
He was born in Sydenham, London, in 1925. He studied at Beckenham School of Art and, following four years in the army, studied at the Royal College of Art from 1947, in London, where he studied alongside Walter Hoyle and Sheila Robinson, and his teachers included Edward Bawden and Edwin La Dell.

== Artistic career ==
For the 1951 Festival of Britain, Cheese painted a mural on the Shot Tower and in 1953 was involved in La Dell's 'Coronation Suite', providing a lithograph. This helped to launch his career. He taught printmaking at St Martin's School of Art from 1950 to 1968, then at Goldsmiths College from 1970 to 1978, and Central School of Art and Design (1980–89).

He designed posters for London Transport, with several commissions from 1951. He also did commissions for Guinness (an illustrated mathematics book), the BBC and P&O Cruises.

In the 1950s he moved to the artists' community of Great Bardfield in Essex, which was also home to Bawden.

He exhibited in Beijing (1956), Stockholm (1960), Washington DC (1962) and New York (1968). Other shows include "Bon Appétit!: lithographs and watercolours by Bernard Cheese" at Aberystwyth University in 2002.

He became a fellow of the Royal Society of Painter-Printmakers in 1988.

== Works ==
A Fisherman's Story (1956) is owned by Tate in London.

Other works are in the collections of the Victoria and Albert Museum, the British Royal Collection, the British Government Art Collection, the New York Museum of Modern Art, New York Public Library, Contemporary Art Society, the Towner Art Gallery, Eastbourne, the Ashmolean Museum and Aberystwyth University, which holds more than 100 of his works. In 2000, the Fry Art Gallery (Saffron Walden) received thirty of his lithographs.

== Personal life ==
In 1951 he married Sheila Robinson, an artist from Nottinghamshire. They divorced in 1968 and he married Brenda Latham Brown, a former student. His daughters Chloe Cheese (with Sheila), Joanna Cheese and Sarah Cheese are also artists.
