= Big Cheese =

A big cheese is a boss or other senior person, particularly in an organization.

Big Cheese or The Big Cheese may also refer to:

== Arts and entertainment ==
=== Music ===
- Big Cheese (band), an English straight edge hardcore punk band
- "Big Cheese", a song by the American rock band Bayside from their 2014 album, Cult
- "Big Cheese", a song by the American rock band Nirvana from their 1989 album, Bleach

=== Television and film ===
- "The Big Cheese", an episode of the animated series Camp Lazlo
- "The Big Cheese" (Dexter's Laboratory), a 1996 episode
- "The Big Cheese" (Foster's Home for Imaginary Friends), a 2006 episode
- "The Big Cheese", an episode of the animated series Maggie and the Ferocious Beast
- The Big Cheese (film), a 2025 documentary film
- "The Big Cheese" (North Square), a 2000 episode

== Other ==
- Big Cheese (magazine), an independent music magazine published in the United Kingdom
- Big Cheese Festival, an annual food festival held in Caerphilly, Wales
- Bodalla Big Cheese, a visitor attraction in Bodalla, New South Wales
- Big Cheese, the prime minister of Little Tokyo in the anime Samurai Pizza Cats
- The Big Cheese, former professional wrestling manager of American former professional wrestler Stan Lane (born 1953)

== See also ==
- Cheese (disambiguation)
