= Park Bo-gum =

South Korean actor (born 1993)

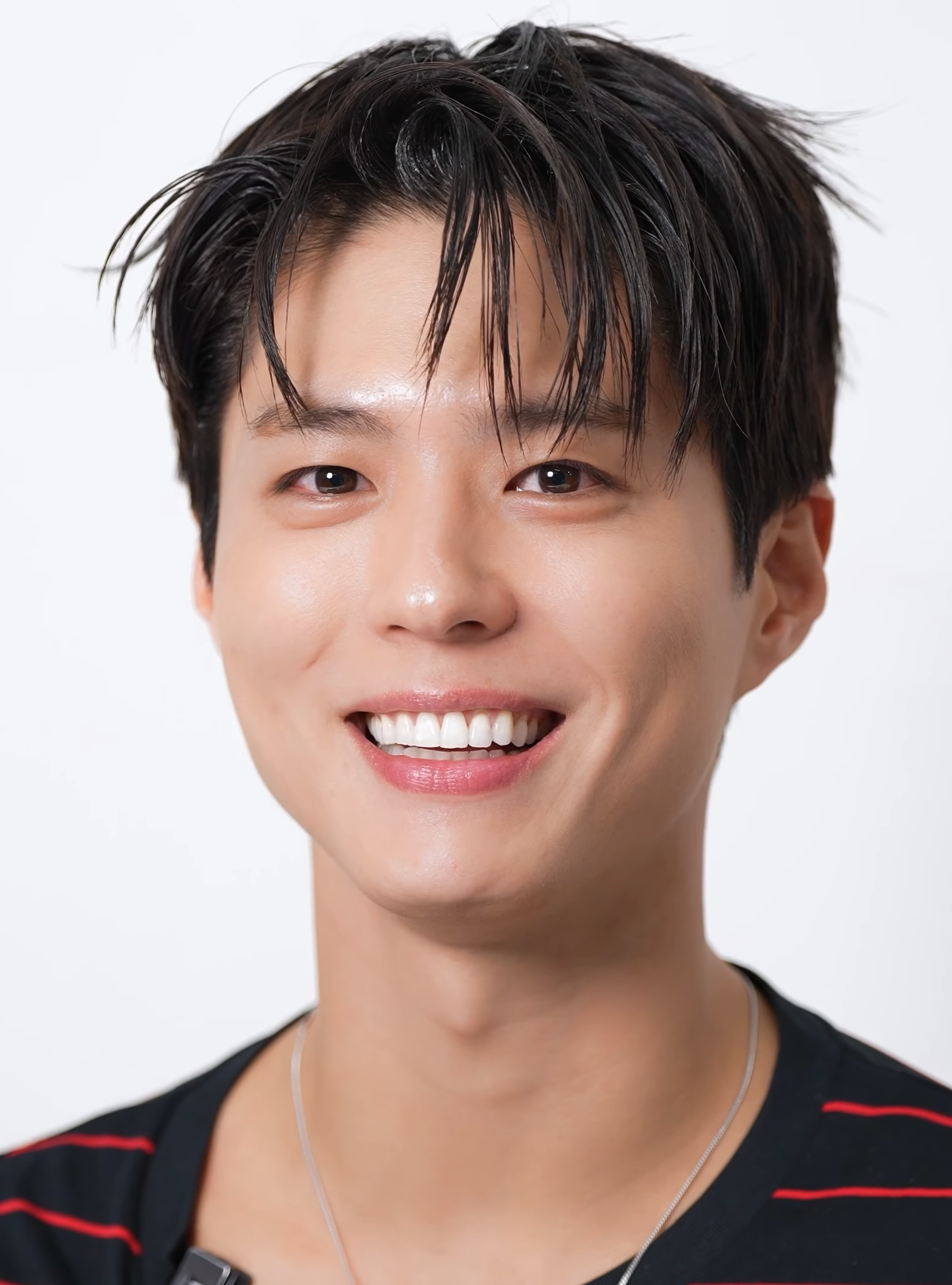
- Park in 2025
- Born: June 16, 1993 (age 33); Seoul, South Korea
- Education: Myongji University (BA); Sangmyung University (MA)
- Occupations: Actor; singer
- Years active: 2011–present
- Agent: The Black Label
- Works: Filmography; discography; theater
- Awards: Full list
- Musical career
- Instruments: Vocals; piano
- Years active: 2018–present
- Label: Pony Canyon

Korean name
- Hangul: 박보검
- RR: Bak Bogeom
- MR: Pak Pogŏm

Signature
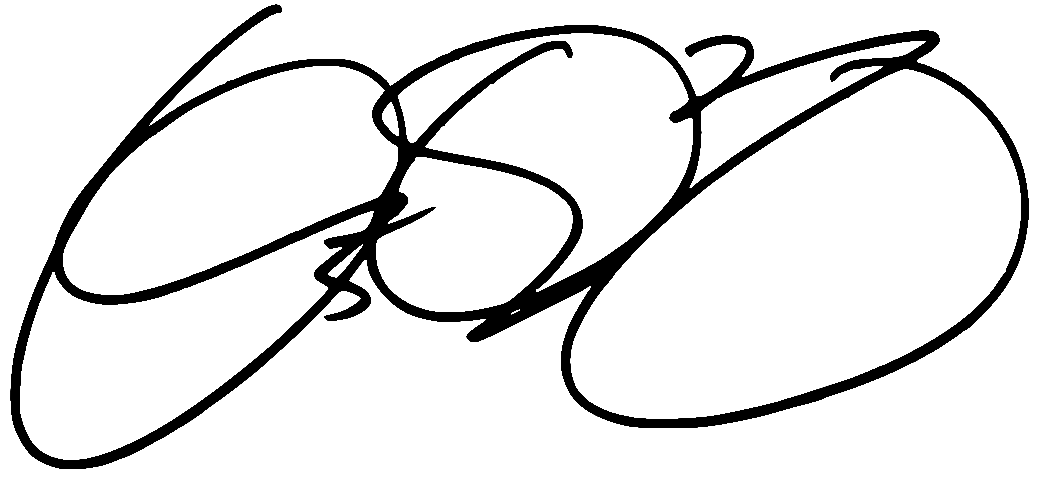

Park Bo-gum (Korean: 박보검; born June 16, 1993) is a South Korean actor and singer. He gained recognition for his work in film and television and is the youngest actor to be named Gallup Korea's Television Actor of the Year twice. He is also the first actor to top the Forbes Korea Power Celebrity list. Park has received major industry honors. He is regarded as a prominent figure of the Korean Wave.

== Early life and education ==
Park was born in Mok-dong, Seoul, South Korea on June 16, 1993, the youngest of three siblings. His given name, "Bo-gum" (Korean: 보검; Hanja: 寶劍), translates to "precious sword" and was given to him by a pastor. His mother died when he was in fourth grade.

Park began piano lessons in kindergarten and maintained an interest in music throughout his studies. Following his 2012 graduation from Shinmok High School, he enrolled as a musical theatre major at Myongji University in March 2014. After receiving his baccalaureate in February 2018, Park continued his studies and earned a master's degree in New Media Music at the Graduate School of Sangmyung University.

== Career ==
=== 2011–2014: Beginnings ===
During his sophomore year of high school, Park sent a video of himself singing and playing the piano to major entertainment agencies and received callbacks from SM, YG, and JYP among others. Although he initially intended to become a singer-songwriter, a talent agent recommended that he pursue acting, and Park subsequently signed with an agency representing actors.

His acting career began in 2011 with a supporting role in the thriller Blind, alongside Kim Ha-neul. After taking on minor and child roles in several dramas and films, he landed the role of Go Young-jun in the 2013 drama Wonderful Mama (2013). In 2014, he starred in weekend drama Wonderful Days (2014) as the teenage version of Lee Seo-jin's character Dong-seok. He concluded 2014 by portraying a gifted cellist in Naeil's Cantabile.

=== 2015–2021: Rise to prominence, breakthrough, and international popularity ===
Park drew positive reviews for his performance in the crime drama Hello Monster (2015). His portrayal earned him the Popularity Award and Best Supporting Actor Award at the 2015 KBS Drama Awards. The same year, he appeared in Han Jun-hee's neo-noir film Coin Locker Girl. The role earned him a nomination for the Best New Actor in Film at the 52nd Baeksang Arts Awards and won him the Rising Star Award at the 11th MaxMovie Awards. From May 2015 to June 2016, Park hosted the music show Music Bank with singer Irene. The pairing received significant media attention for their hosting and vocal performances, with press outlets identifying them as one of the program's best partnerships.

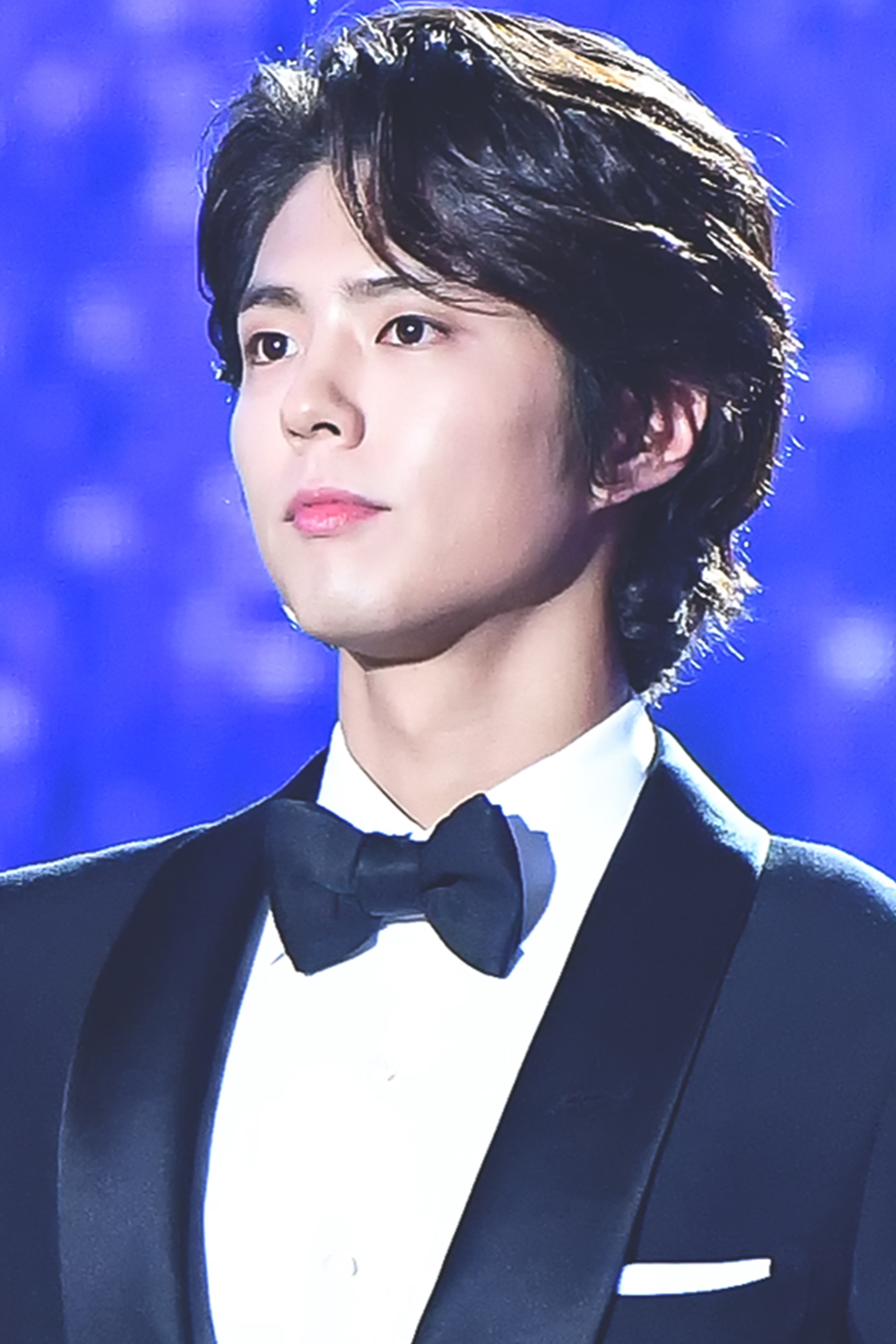
Park at the Baeksang Arts Awards in May 2018

In 2016, Park auditioned for the third installment of the Reply series, Reply 1988, by Shin Won-ho and Lee Woo-jung. He successfully passed the audition and portrayed the character Choi Taek, a professional baduk player. In August 2016, Park took on his first leading role as Crown Prince Lee Young in KBS2's historical drama Love in the Moonlight, directed by Kim Seong-yoon and based on the webtoon Moonlight Drawn By Clouds. Park was named Gallup Korea's Television Actor of the Year in 2016 and became the first actor to top the Forbes Korea Power Celebrity 40 list in 2017.

Park took a hiatus from acting to focus on his studies. His first project following this break was the tvN drama Encounter, which began filming in September 2018. The series was the first Korean drama partially filmed in Cuba. In 2020, Park starred in the tvN drama Record of Youth, directed by Ahn Gil-ho. He played Sa Hye-jun, a model aspiring to be an actor.

=== 2022–present: Career post enlistment ===
In December 2022, Park ended his contract with Blossom Entertainment after a decade with the agency. In January 2023, he signed with The Black Label. His first acting project following his military discharge was a role in the musical Let Me Fly. Director Lee Dae-woong noted that Park expressed interest in joining the production after attending the premiere performance. The show ran from September 26 to December 10, 2023, marking Park's stage debut. Ticket for his performances were reportedly sold out.

In the following year, He hosted the 2024 MAMA Awards in Los Angeles, California.

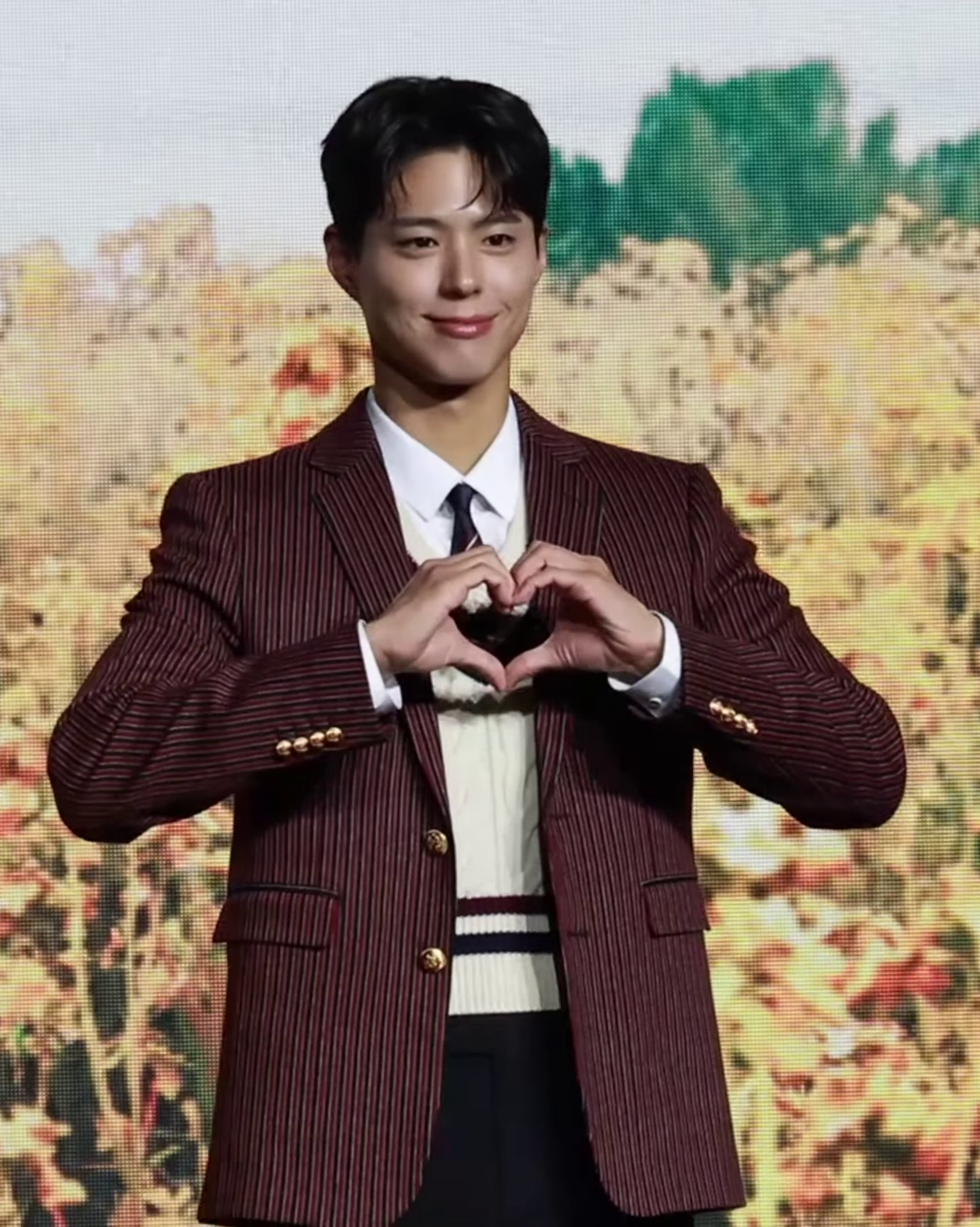
Park at an event for When Life Gives You Tangerines in March 2025

In March 2025, Park starred in the Netflix television series When Life Gives You Tangerines, directed by Kim Won-seok and written by Lim Sang-choon. This was followed by the JTBC series Good Boy, directed by Shim Na-yeon, in which Park played Yoon Dong-joo, a former Olympic gold medalist in boxing who becomes a police officer. Beyond his acting work, Park hosted KBS2's late-night music talk show The Seasons: Park Bo-gum's Cantabile from March until August 2025, for which he received the Best Entertainer Award at the 52nd Korea Broadcasting Prizes. He was also nominated for the Grand Prize (Daesang) at the 23rd KBS Entertainment Awards and won the Entertainer of the Year award. With a series of well-received projects, Moon Ji-yeon from Sport Chosun referred to 2025 as the "Year of Park Bo-gum". In December 2025, Park was named the 2025 Gallup Korea's Television Actor of the Year, his second time being selected.

== Public image ==
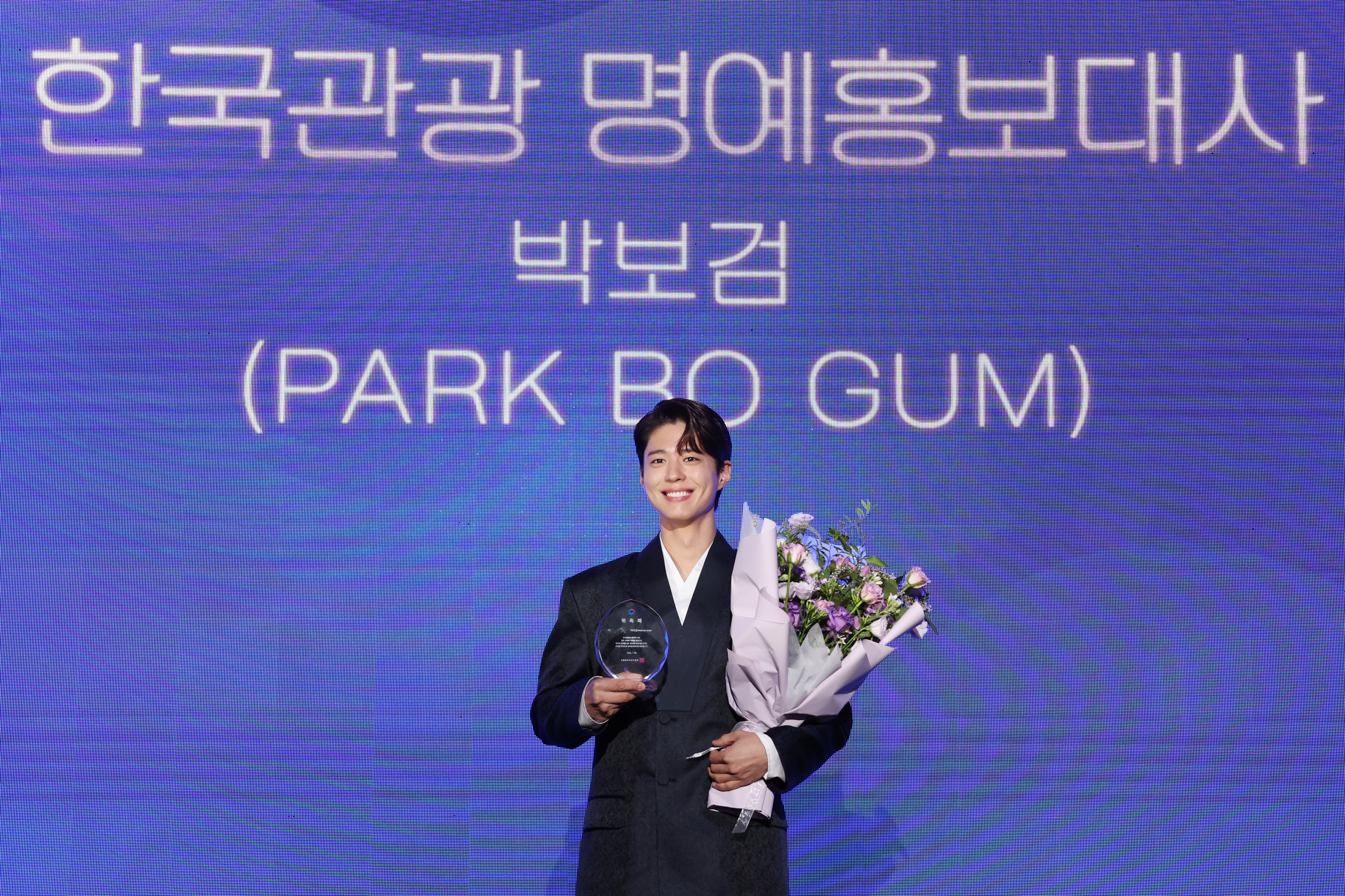
Park at his appointment ceremony as honorary ambassador for South Korean tourism, July 2025

Park became widely known in South Korea in his early twenties. Regarded as a prominent figure of the Korean Wave, the official web portal of the South Korean government has described him as a "hallyu superstar".

In 2016, Park became the youngest actor to be named Gallup Korea's Television Actor of the Year at age 23. In 2017, he topped Forbes magazine's Korea Power Celebrity list, making him the first actor to do so, and has been included in the list regularly since. He was one of the torchbearers of the 2018 Winter Olympics. Through his screen roles and public persona, he has been attributed several nicknames by media outlets, including "Nation's Little Brother", "Nation's Crown Prince", "Nation's Boyfriend", "Nation's Son-in-Law", and "Prince of Asia".

Park has served as an ambassador and endorser for a wide range of dometic and international brands. The Korean Business Research Institute has referred to his strong consumer influence as the "Park Bo-gum Effect", noting his consistently high brand reputation rankings. He was voted the Top Celebrity Endorser of 2017 by South Korean marketing executives, and has ranked highly in Korea Broadcast Advertising Corporation's Advertising Model of the Year surveys.

In April 2025, The Ministry of Culture, Sports and Tourism appointed Park as the face of 2025 Hanbok Wave Initiative.

== Personal life ==
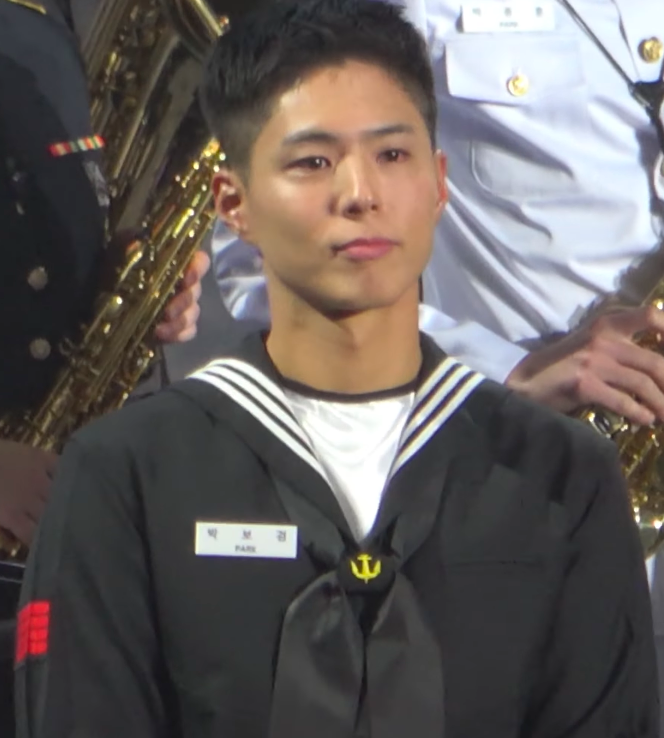
Park serving the Republic of Korea Navy during his military service, November 2021

On August 31, 2020, Park enlisted as an active-duty soldier with the Republic of Korea Navy's Military Band and Honor Guard Cultural Promotion Corps as part of his compulsory military service. Park was originally scheduled for discharge on April 30, 2022, but was released on February 21, 2022, after using his remaining leave in accordance with the Ministry of Defense COVID-19 guidelines. During his service, Park obtained a barber's license.

== Filmography ==
Selected filmography

- Hello Monster (2015)
- Reply 1988 (2015–16)
- Love in the Moonlight (2016)
- Encounter (2018–19)
- Record of Youth (2020)
- When Life Gives You Tangerines (2025)
- Good Boy (2025)

== Theater ==
Musical play performances of Park Bo-gum
Year	Title		Role	Venue	Date	Ref.
Year	English	Korean	Role	Venue	Date	Ref.
2023	Let Me Fly	렛미플라이	Nam-won (young)	Yes24 Stage 1	Sep 26–Dec 10	
2023	Let Me Fly	렛미플라이	Nam-won (young)	Pyeongchon Art Hall	December 23–24	

== Discography ==
=== Studio albums ===
Title	Album details	Peak chart positions	Sales
Title	Album details	JPN	Sales
Blue Bird	Released: March 18, 2020; Label: Pony Canyon; Track listing: 1. "Dear My Friend"; 2. "Yume No Route" (夢の Route); 3. "Come On & Join Us"; 4. "Fall Into My Arms"; 5. "Look Up at the Sky" (空を見上げてごらん, Sora wo Miagete Goran); 6. "Guiding Star"; 7. "Best Love Song"; 8. "Brilliant Days"; 9. "By Your Side" (君のそばに, Kimi no Sobani); 10. "Bloomin'" (Acoustic ver.); 11. "Happy Merry Christmas" (Japanese ver.)	8	JPN: 12,233

=== Video albums ===
Title	Details
Park Bo-gum Christmas Eve in Japan	Release date: October 31, 2018 (Japan); Label: Pony Canyon; Format: Two-disc DVD Set; Track listing: 1. "Yukiguni" (雪国); 2. "Rainy Blue" (レイニーブルー); 3. "December 24" (12月24日); 4. "Partner for Life" (私の人); 5. "Love Letter"; 6. "Swallowing My Heart" (心を飲み込む)
2019 Park Bo-gum Asia Tour in Japan	Release date: August 21, 2019 (Japan); Label: Pony Canyon; Format: Two-disc DVD Set; Track listing Disc 1: 1. Choahamunida (チョアハムニダ); 2. Opening Talk (トークコーナー); 3. Talk 1 (トークコーナー); 4. Talk 2 (トークコーナー); 5. Good Day Class (トークコーナー); 6. Present Time (トークコーナー); Disc 2: 1. Pyoru Boro Kaja (ピョル ボロ カジャ); 2. Kudeyaman Heyo (クデヨヤマン ヘヨ); 3. Angeggiru (アンゲッギル); 4. Ne Saramu (ネ サラム); 5. "Honey"; 6. Kudewa Hamuke (クデワ ハムケ); 7. Maumuru Samukinda (マウムル サムキンダ); 8. Kure Uri Hamuke (クレ、ウリ ハムケ); 9. "Hanamo"; 10. "Bloomin'"; 11. Choppuru Hana (チョップルハナ); 12. "Must Have Love"; 13. Chuppokuhamunida (チュッポクハムニダ); 14. Behind-the-Scenes (特典映像); 15. Special Contents (特典映像)

=== Singles ===
==== As lead artist ====
Title	Year	Peak chart positions		Sales	Album
Title	Year	KOR	JPN	Sales	Album
"My Person" (내 사람)	2016	3	—	KOR: 335,921 (dig.)	Love in the Moonlight OST
"Bloomin'"	2019	—	3	JPN: 31,206 (phy.)	Blue Bird
"Dear My Friend"	2020	—	—	—	Blue Bird
"All My Love"	2020	— (Note: "All My Love" did not enter the Circle Digital Chart, but the physical version of the single peaked at number 11 on the Circle Album Chart.)	11	KOR: 5,000 (phy.); JPN: 5,964 (phy.)	Non-album single
"Waterfall" (날 찾아가는 길)	2025	—	—	—	Good Boy OST
"Uphill Road (ft. Yoon Jong-shin)"	2025	—	—	—	Non-album single
"Everyday With You (매일 그대와)"	2025				Reply 1988 10th Anniversary OST
"—" denotes releases that did not chart or were not released in that region.

==== Promotional singles ====
Title	Year	Peak chart positions		Sales	Album
Title	Year	KOR	JPN	Sales	Album
"Let's Go See The Stars" (별 보러 가자)	2018	— (Note: "Let's Go See The Stars" did not enter the Circle Digital Chart, but it peaked at number 85 on the component Download Chart.)	—	—	Eider 2018 Fall/Winter Ad
"Happy Merry Christmas"	2019	—	—	—	Non-album single
"On My Way"	2025	—	—	—	Non-album single
"—" denotes releases that did not chart or were not released in that region.

==== As featured artist ====
Title	Year	Peak chart positions		Sales	Album
Title	Year	KOR	JPN	Sales	Album
"The World is Changing" (세상은 변해가) (Let Me Fly Cast featuring Park Bo-gum)	2023	—	—	—	Let Me Fly OST
"Jeongbun-ah" (정분아) (Let Me Fly Cast featuring Park Bo-gum)	2023	—	—	—	Let Me Fly OST
"Narrow, Narrow Room" (좁고 좁은 방) (Let Me Fly Cast featuring Park Bo-gum)	2023	—	—	—	Let Me Fly OST
"Travel" (여행) (Let Me Fly Cast featuring Park Bo-gum)	2023	—	—	—	Let Me Fly OST
"Leader of Fashion" (패션의 리더) (Let Me Fly Cast featuring Park Bo-gum)	2023	—	—	—	Let Me Fly OST
"Turn the Needle + Seonhee 2" (바늘을 틀어 + 선희야 2) (Let Me Fly Cast featuring Park Bo-gum)	2023	—	—	—	Let Me Fly OST
"Travel (Special)" (여행 (Special)) (Let Me Fly Cast featuring Park Bo-gum)	2023	—	—	—	Let Me Fly OST
"If It Was Me" (Piano by Park Bo-gum)	2025	—	—	—	Non-album single
"Hyehwa-dong (or Ssangmun-dong) (혜화동 (혹은 쌍문동))" (Ssangmun-dong Kids featuring Park Bo-gum)	2025				Reply 1988 10th Anniversary OST
"—" denotes releases that did not chart or were not released in that region.

=== Music videos ===
Year	Title	Album	Ref.
2018	"Let's Go See The Stars"	Non-album single	
2019	"Bloomin'"	Blue Bird	
2020	"Dear My Friend	Blue Bird	
2020	"All My Love"	Non-album single	
2025	"Waterfall"	Good Boy OST	
2025	"On My Way"	Non-album single	
2025	"Everyday With You"	Reply 1988 10th Anniversary OST	
2025	"Hyehwa-dong (or Ssangmun-dong)"	Reply 1988 10th Anniversary OST	

== Awards and nominations ==
Park has received various awards and nominations across film, television, theater, and entertainment, including two Baeksang Arts Awards and a Blue Dragon Series Award. He has also received state recognition, notably a Prime Minister's Commendation in 2022 for his participation in charitable and volunteer activities. Park has been included multiple times in the Forbes Korea Power Celebrity list and Gallup Korea's Television Actor of the Year survey, topping the former once and the latter twice.
