= KOBACO =

South Korean media company

Korea Broadcast Advertising Corp. (KOBACO)
- Type: Government funded public media representative
- Headquarters: 25 Taepyungno 1ga, Jung Gu, Seoul, South Korea 100-50
- Key people: Koak, Sung-Moon (CEO)
- Established: 20 January 1981; May 2012 (as government-funded media representative)
- Official website: kobaco.co.kr (Korean) kobaco.co.kr/site/eng/home (English)

Korean name
- Hangul: 한국방송광고진흥공사
- Hanja: 韓國放送廣告振興公社
- RR: Hanguk bangsong gwanggo jinheung gongsa
- MR: Han'guk pangsong kwanggo chinhŭng kongsa

Korea Broadcast Advertising Corporation (KOBACO; Korean: 한국방송광고진흥공사) is the only media representative in South Korea operating as an agency that represents every terrestrial broadcasting company of South Korea for their broadcast advertising sales. KOBACO was established in 1981 and it was re-established as a government-funded public media representative in May 2012.

== History ==
=== Beginnings ===
KOBACO was established in 1981.

=== 1980s ===
After its establishment in 1981, KOBACO started broadcast advertising sales on behalf of MBC and KBS. KOBACO moved into the Press Center after its completion in 1985. The following years, KOBACO completed the construction of Namhan River Training Institute (now KOBACO Training Institute) and KOBACO Advertising Academy. In 1987, it established the KOBACO Advertising Academy.

=== 1990s ===
In 1991, KOBACO expanded its broadcast advertising sales on behalf of SBS. It also completed the third construction phase for Seoul Arts Center, Arirang Tower, and the Broadcasting Center in the late 1990s.

=== 2000s ===
In 2000, the KOBACO act was revised and launched the Ratings Survey Verification Council. In 2003, KOBACO opened the KOBAnet (Korean Broadcasting Advertising Network) and in the following year KOBACO confirmed the launch of terrestrial DMB advertising sales. In 2005, KOBACO reopened the Namhan River Training Institute after putting it under direct management. It also launched the KOBACO Data Express (KODEX) the same year. In 2006, KOBACO opened the KOBACO Advertising Culture Center and established the new KOBACO CI the following year. In 2008, KOBACO opened the Advertising Museum in 2008. In 2009, KOBACO opened the online sales system called ADport and it also held the first Public Service Advertising Festival.

=== 2010s ===
In 2010, applicable laws for virtual advertising and PPL were established. In 2012, KOBACO was re-established as the only government-funded public media representative. KOBACO's area of business expanded from broadcast advertising sales for TV, radio and Digital Multimedia Broadcasting (DMB) to those for cable, IPTV, and satellite broadcasting.

== List of leaders ==
Term	Name	Term of office
1st	Hong Doo-pyo	January 20, 1981 – August 29, 1986
2nd	Ha Soon-bong	August 29, 1986 – December 24, 1987
3rd	Nam Woong-jong	April 12, 1988 – March 11, 1993
4th	Sung Nak-seung	March 11, 1993 – March 10, 1996
5th	Seo Byung-ho	March 11, 1996 – April 12, 1998
6th	Bae Ki-sun	April 13, 1998 – January 11, 2000
7th	Kang Dong-yeon	February 2, 2000 – February 1, 2003
8th	Kim Keun	May 12, 2003 – May 11, 2006
9th	Jung Soon-kyun	May 12, 2006 – April 14, 2008
10th	Yang Hwi-boo	June 16, 2008 – July 13, 2011
11th	Lee Won-chang	July 13, 2011 – July 31, 2014
12th	Kwak Sung-moon	September 26, 2014 – December 7, 2017
(Acting President)	Min Won-shik	December 8, 2017 – September 3, 2018
13th	Kim Ki-man	September 4, 2018 – October 1, 2021
14th	Lee Baek-man	October 1, 2021 – April 27, 2024
(Acting President)	Lee Jun-an	April 28 – August 1, 2024
15th	Min Young-sam	August 1, 2024 – May 7, 2026
(Acting President)	Lee Jun-an	May 8, 2026 – present

== Structure ==
KOBACO is an independently managed public corporation (공사,公社) funded by the South Korean government. KOBACO consists of several departments which could be listed as follows:

=== Industry Development & Support ===
The Industry Development & Support consists of Advertising Promotion Division, Public Service Division and Advertising Infrastructure Team. As the only government funded advertising management representative of South Korea, the aforementioned divisions engage in diverse business with the goal to improve the general industry and promote public interests. Since its establishment in 1981, KOBACO raised awareness of social issues through broadcasting PSA (public service advertisement). It also operates the Advertising Museum, Advertising Academy, KOBACO Training Institute, Advertising Library and Advertising Research Institute.

=== Media Business Headquarter ===
The Media Business Headquarter consists of Media Policy Division, New Business Development Division, and Marketing Research Team. The Media Business Department carries out the MCR (Media & Consumer Research) and announces the PEI index. It is equipped with IT Infrastructure such as KOBAnet and KODEX. KOBAnet is a comprehensive IT e-commerce broadcast advertising system which is designed for advertisement agencies to manage the process of purchasing broadcast ads. KODEX is a digital expressway for broadcast advertising distribution. Through broadcast advertising it supports small and medium-sized businesses while expanding its domain to DMB and New Media. It is recently expanding its relations with media advertisement agencies and supporting foreign media agencies that wish to advertise in Korea and vice versa. The New Business Development Division consists of New Media Business Team and Global Business Team. The Global Business Team focuses on linking clients in both Korea and overseas who wish to advertise on print or broadcast stations. KOBACO provides international advertisers with customized services and uses its work agreement with WPP to assist clients' marketing strategies.

=== Sales Headquarter ===
The Sales Headquarter consists of Sales Division I, II, Sales Planning Team and branches in Busan, Daegu, Gwangju and Daejeon. KOBACO expanded its business to MSO, IPTY and cable programs after the Act on Proxy Sales of Broadcast Advertising, ETC. became effective in May 2012.

== KOBACO Foundation ==
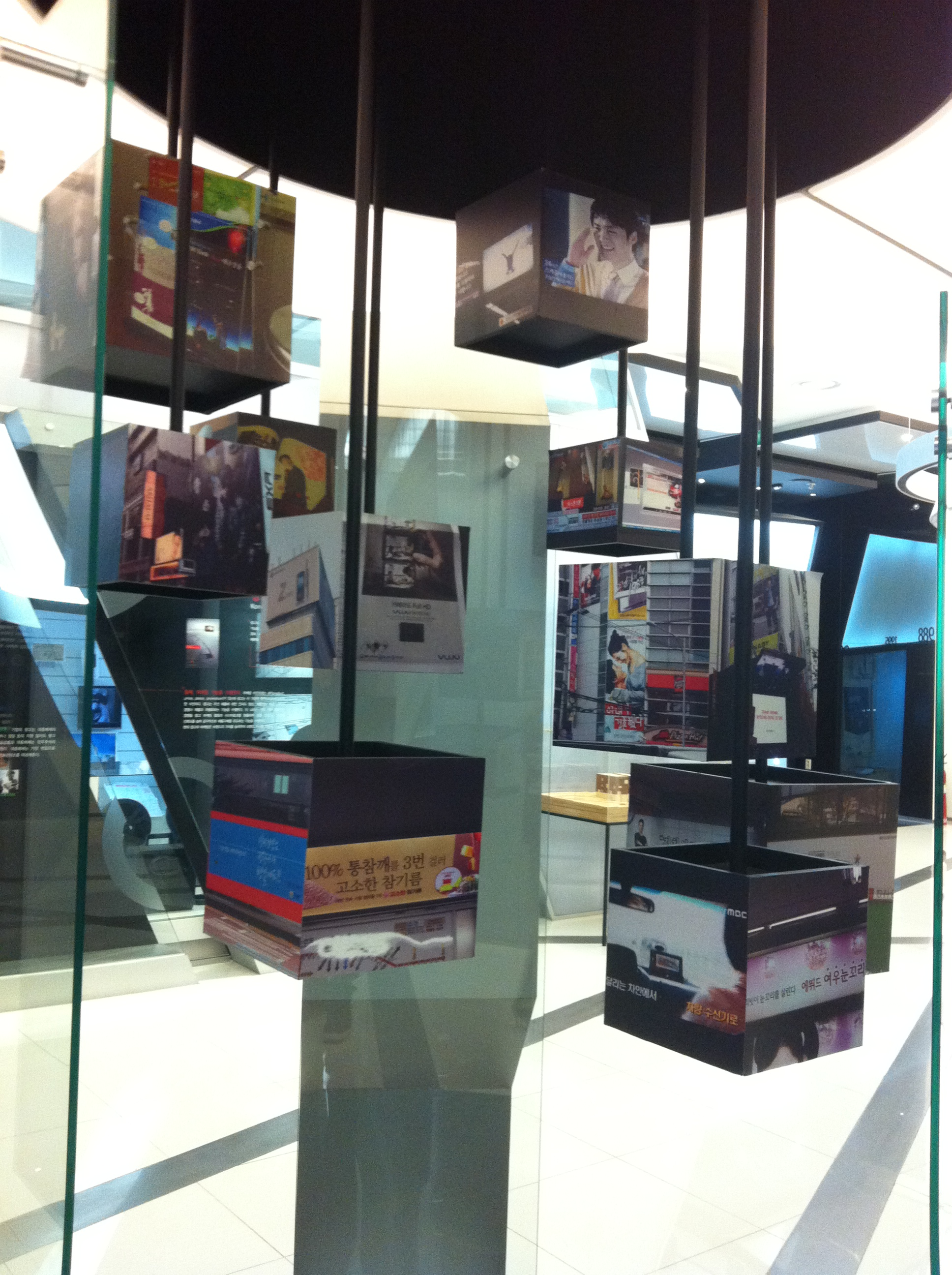
KOBACO Advertising Museum

=== KOBACO Advertising Academy ===
KOBACO Advertising Academy is the first domestic advertising educational institute officially recognized by the International Advertising Association (IAA) in 1999. Since 2007, it began providing training programs to potential employees and those interested in learning more about advertisement.

=== KOBACO Advertising Museum ===
The KOBACO Advertising Museum holds eight exhibitions ranging from history of Korean society through advertising to advertising with major social impacts. The museum is used as an educational venue about advertising developments and its digital archive has about 45,000 ads from 1886 to the present.

=== KOBACO Advertising Culture Center ===
The Advertising Culture Center opened in 2006 as the collective space to accommodate the KOBACO Advertising Academy, Library, Museum, and Research Institute. Korea Federation of Advertising Associations, Korea Advertising Society, Korea Association of Advertising Agencies, and Korea Commercial Film Maker Union can also be found here.

== RACOI ==
Developed by the Korea Communications Commission and the Korea Broadcast Advertising Corporation, RACOI (Response Analysis on Content of the Internet) is the Broadcast Content Value Information Analysis System designed to measure the hidden value of television programs and cast members that traditional viewership ratings cannot capture. By crawling and collecting internet buzz data from domestic and international websites, the system tracks content across approximately 28 channels, including terrestrial, general programming, and cable networks. Its evaluation framework is divided into media buzz, which tallies news articles from portals like Naver and Daum alongside video uploads on platforms such as YouTube, and viewer buzz, which aggregates community posts across forums like DC Inside, user comments, and total video view counts. Weekly and monthly internet response metrics have been tracked since May 2017, while cast rankings were added to the system beginning in January 2021.

== Affiliated organization ==
=== Korea Public Service Advertisement Council ===
The Korea Public Service Advertisement Council (공익광고협의회; 公益廣告協議會) is an organization under the Korea Broadcasting Advertisement Promotion Corporation, and is composed of around 20 prominent figures representing all walks of life such as advertising academia, media, broadcasting, advertising, and civic groups. The main task is the production of public service advertisements (broadcast public service advertisements, printed public service advertisements), and public service advertisements above a certain level are organized through broadcasting in accordance with broadcasting related laws.
