= Dalchong =

South Korean singer (born 1991)

Cheeze
- 임혜경
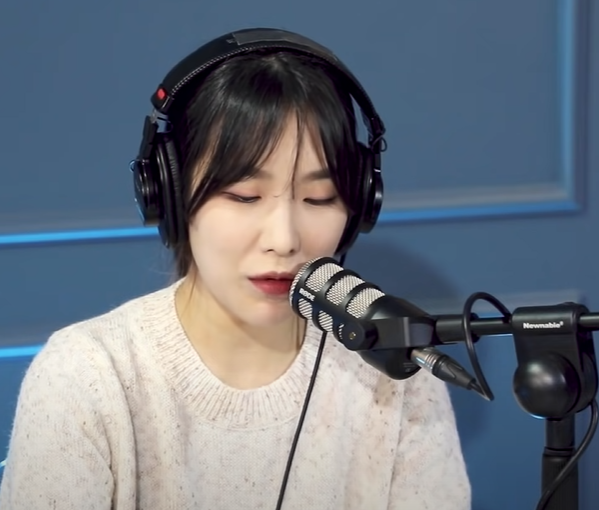
- Dalchong in 2021
- Born: Im Hye-kyung; August 19, 1991 (age 34); South Korea
- Occupation: Singer
- Musical career
- Instrument: Vocals
- Years active: 2011–present
- Labels: Magic Strawberry Sound
- Website: www.msbsound.com

Korean name
- Hangul: 임혜경
- RR: Im Hyegyeong
- MR: Im Hyegyŏng

Stage name
- Hangul: 달총
- RR: Dalchong
- MR: Talch'ong

Im Hye-kyung (Korean: 임혜경, born August 19, 1991), better known by the stage names Dalchong, is a South Korean singer who was a member of Cheeze.

On February 20, 2017, she released her first solo single on. In addition, she is also a member of the special all-female project called CSVC.

== Discography ==
=== Extended plays ===
Title	EP details	Peak chart positions
Title	EP details	KOR
Plate	Released: May 19, 2019; Label: Magic Strawberry Sound; Formats: CD, digital download; Track listing: 1. All Day; 2. We're Everywhere; 3. Orange; 4. Take Time	47
I Can't Tell You Everything	Released: May 18, 2020; Label: Magic Strawberry Sound; Formats: Digital download; Track listing: 1. icanttellUeverything; 2. Today's Mood; 3. That's OK; 4. Watercolour; 5. Excuse	—

=== Singles ===
Title	Year	Peak chart positions	Sales (DL)	Album
Title	Year	KOR	Sales (DL)	Album
As lead artist
"Love You (Bye)" (좋아해 (Bye))	2017	9	KOR: 200,199	Non-album singles
"Be There"	2017	71	KOR: 60,625	Non-album singles
"See You Again" (다음에 또 만나요)	2017	—	KOR: 14,895	Non-album singles
"In a Long Dream" (긴 꿈에서)	2018	—	—N/a	Non-album singles
"Just as a Lie" (거짓말처럼)	2018	—	—N/a	Non-album singles
"Everything To"	2018	—	—N/a	Non-album singles
"We're Everywhere" (우린 어디에나)	2019	107	—N/a	Plate
"Orange"	2019	196	—N/a	Plate
"Today's Mood"	2020	157	—N/a	I Can't Tell You Everything
"That's OK"	2020	—	—N/a	I Can't Tell You Everything
Collaborations
"Perhaps Love" (사랑인가요) with Eric Nam	2017	14	KOR: 273,455	Non-album singles
"Blue Champagne" (사랑인가요) with pH-1	2019	172	No data	Non-album singles
"Breakup for You, Not Yet for Me" (넌 이별 난 아직) with SunnysideMJ	2023	188	No data	Non-album singles
"—" denotes release did not chart.

=== Soundtrack appearances ===
Title	Year	Peak chart positions	Sales (DL)	Album
Title	Year	KOR	Sales (DL)	Album
"How About You" (어떨까 넌)	2017	83	KOR: 48,205	Suspicious Partner OST
"I Still"	2017	48	KOR: 39,916	Temperature of Love OST
"Hard for Me"	2018	—	—N/a	Rich Man OST
"The Day We Met" (영화 같던 날)	2018	—	—N/a	Encounter OST
"Little by Little" (너라서 고마워)	2020	107	—N/a	It's Okay to Not Be Okay OST
"My Romance"	2021	154	—N/a	Hometown Cha-Cha-Cha OST
"달 (치즈)"	2021	-	—N/a	My Roommate Is a Gumiho OST
"Melting" (사르르쿵)	2022	198	Forecasting Love and Weather OST	
"—" denotes release did not chart.
