= Cheeze (band) =

2011–2016 South Korean band

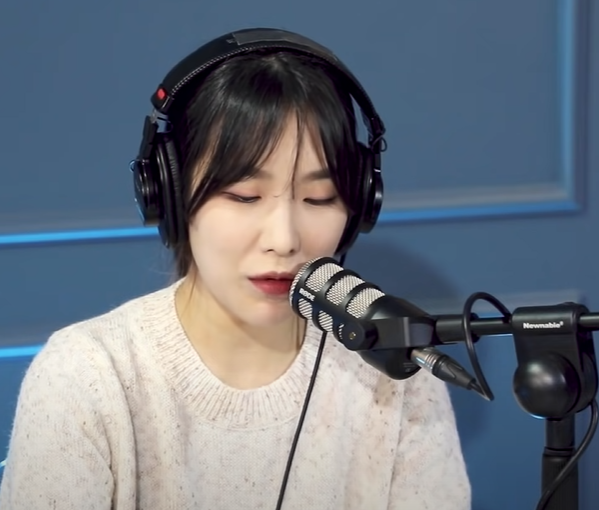
- Cheeze in 2021

Background information
- Origin: Seoul, South Korea
- Genre: Indie rock
- Years active: 2011–present
- Label: Magic Strawberry Sound
- Members: Dalchong
- Past members: Yasu; Moodi; Cloud
- Website: msbsound.com

Cheeze (Korean: 치즈) is a South Korean musical act currently composed of singer-songwriter Dalchong.

Originally a four members band formed in 2011. They released their first album, Recipe, on April 16, 2013. In late 2016, Dalchong was the only remaining member of Cheeze, thus leading to the group's disbandment and Dalchong becoming a solo artist.

== Members ==
- Dalchong – vocalist

== Previous members ==
- Yasu – rapper
- Moodi – producer
- Cloud – producer

== Discography ==
=== Studio albums ===
Title	Album details	Peak chart positions	Sales
Title	Album details	KOR	Sales
Recipe	Released: April 16, 2013; Label: Realcollabo, CJ E&M; Formats: CD, digital download	—	—N/a
Plain	Released: May 13, 2015; Label: In Next Trend, Music Lamp, CJ E&M; Formats: CD, digital download	—	—N/a

=== Extended plays ===
Title	Album details	Peak chart positions	Sales
Title	Album details	KOR	Sales
Q	Released: June 16, 2016; Label: Magic Strawberry Sound, Poclanos; Formats: CD, digital download	43	—N/a

=== Singles ===
Title	Year	Peak chart positions	Sales (DL)	Album
Title	Year	KOR	Sales (DL)	Album
"Home Alone" (나홀로 집에)	2011	—	—N/a	Non-album single
"Mango" (망고)	2013	—	—N/a	Recipe
"Ticket"	2013		—N/a	Plain
"Mystery Girl"	2013	—	—N/a	Plain
"Balloons"	2013	—	—N/a	Plain
"Room #501"	2014	—	—N/a	Plain
"Pinocchio" (피노키오)	2014	—	—N/a	Plain
"Alone"	2014	—	—N/a	Non-album singles
"Do It Again"	2014	—	—N/a	Non-album singles
"I'll Be There for You" (잘 다녀와요)	2014	—	—N/a	Non-album singles
"Everyone's Moment" (모두의 순간)	2015	—	—N/a	Plain
"Now What" (이제 뭐라고)	2015	—	—N/a	Non-album single
"Mood Indigo"	2016	—	—N/a	Q
"How Do You Think" (어떻게 생각해)	2016	—	—N/a	Q
"—" denotes releases that did not chart.
