= Audrey Cruddas =

English painter

Audrey Cruddas (1912–1979) was an English costume and scene designer, painter and potter.

== Biography ==
Born in Johannesburg, South Africa, Cruddas moved to England with her parents when she was an infant. After leaving school she studied art at St John's Wood School of Art, Royal Academy Schools, and Bram Shaw School of Drawing and Painting. During the Second World War, she worked as a 'Land Girl' in the Women's Land Army. At the end of the conflict she began to design costumes for the theatre and was quickly talent spotted by the dancer and actor Sir Robert Helpmann. Cruddas soon became one of the leading modern theatre designers of the post war period.

Cruddas' first commission was designing costumes for The White Devil at the Duchess Theatre, London (1947). This production starred her friend and mentor Robert Helpmann. Other early career highlights were for John Burrell’s 1947 Old Vic production of Taming of the Shrew and Verdi's, Aida at Convent Garden (1948). Notable later productions include Michael Benthall’s Old Vic productions of Julius Caesar (1955), Cymbeline (1957), and Hamlet (1958), and Peter Potter's Edinburgh Festival production of ‘The Wallace’ (1960).

In 1952, Cruddas illustrated a Folio Society edition of William Shakespeare’s, The Tragedy of Antony & Cleopatra (the forward of this edition was written by her friend, Laurence Olivier) and the book was republished again in 1963. Although best known for her theatre work she was an accomplished artist in different mediums – painting, drawing and ceramics. That same year, she also won the Donaldson Award for outstanding achievement for her designs for Caesar and Cleopatra.

In the early 1950s, Cruddas moved to the Essex village of Great Bardfield. At Bardfield she became involved with the dynamic art community which included: John Aldridge, Edward Bawden, George Chapman, Stanley Clifford-Smith, Joan Glass, Walter Hoyle, Sheila Robinson, Michael Rothenstein, Marianne Straub, among others. During this period she focused on watercolour paintings.

Cruddas lived in Walton House, Great Bardfield (next door to Edward Bawden's Brick House) during most of the 1950s and she was an important member of the art community that lived in the Essex village. In the 1960s, she moved to Bank House, Botesdale, Suffolk. During her exhibiting career, her paintings were shown at the Islington Galleries and the Augustin Gallery, Holborn.

Cruddas' work is in the collections of the Victoria and Albert Museum, the British Museum and the Fry Art Gallery at Saffron Walden.

== Bibliography ==
- David Buckman, The Dictionary of Artists in Britain Since 1945, Art Dictionaries Ltd, Bristol, 1998.
- Martin Salisbury (ed), Artists at the Fry, Ruskin Press, Cambridge, 2003.
- Frances Spalding, 'The Women of Bardfield' (exhibition catalogue), Fry Art Gallery, Saffron Walden, 2010.
