= Stanley Clifford-Smith =

English painter

Stanley Clifford-Smith (1906–1968) was an English Expressionist painter and textile designer who was active as an artist in the 1940s, 1950s and 1960s.

== Early life ==
The son of a photographer, Clifford-Smith was born in Reddish, Stockport, Cheshire and was educated in Manchester and Paris. In the 1930s he was involved in the carpet trade working firstly as a salesman and later as a designer for James Templeton & Co in Scotland. It was at this time that he first began to paint.

== Art ==
During the Second World War, Clifford-Smith was a member of the Royal Naval Volunteer Reserve. After leaving the armed forces, he married the English artist Joan Glass (1915–2000). The couple left London for Suffolk in 1947. While in East Anglia he painted mainly religious works much influenced by the French expressionist, Georges Rouault. In 1952 he moved with his family to Great Bardfield in north west Essex, firstly living in Buck's House, Great Bardfield. In his new home Clifford-Smith was an active member of the Great Bardfield art community during the mid to late 1950s and later became the Honorary Secretary of the group. During the 1950s the Bardfield artists included: John Aldridge, Edward Bawden, George Chapman, Stanley Clifford-Smith, Audrey Cruddas, Joan Glass, Walter Hoyle, Sheila Robinson, Michael Rothenstein, Marianne Straub, among others. The Great Bardfield Artists were diverse in style and rivalled the better known art community at St. Ives. Clifford-Smith and the other Bardfield artists exhibited in the large 'open house' shows in the isolated village in 1954, 1955 and 1958. These shows attracted thousands of visitors and made the art community famous thanks to national press coverage and several one-off and touring shows in the late 1950s.

The artists work in the 1950s was diverse and included Irish and Italian landscapes, images of ships, as well as hypnotic 'mother and child' portraits. Clifford-Smith received many positive press reviews for his work while at Great Bardfield. In 1958 the artist moved to the Old Bakehouse in Great Bardfield. In the early 1960s the Great Bardfield art community fragmented and Clifford-Smith and his family moved to Little Baddow Hall near Chelmsford. During his time at Little Baddow he painted mainly thickly textured monochrome moon portraits. Following his death, the artist had several important exhibitions of his work; a retrospective at The Minories, Colchester (November 1969), Little Baddow Hall Arts Centre (July 1979) and at the Fry Art Gallery, Saffron Walden (September/October 1998). His work is included in several prominent collections including: the Benjamin Britten Foundation, Aldeburgh, Suffolk; the Beecroft Art Gallery, Southend, Essex; and Thaxted Church, Thaxted, Essex.

== Personal life ==
The artist disliked his forename and signed his work under the name 'S. Clifford-Smith'. He was twice married, first to Susan Taylor and later to Joan Glass. He was survived by five children from his two marriages.
