= Great Bardfield =

Village in Essex, England

Coordinates: 51°56′55″N 00°26′15″E

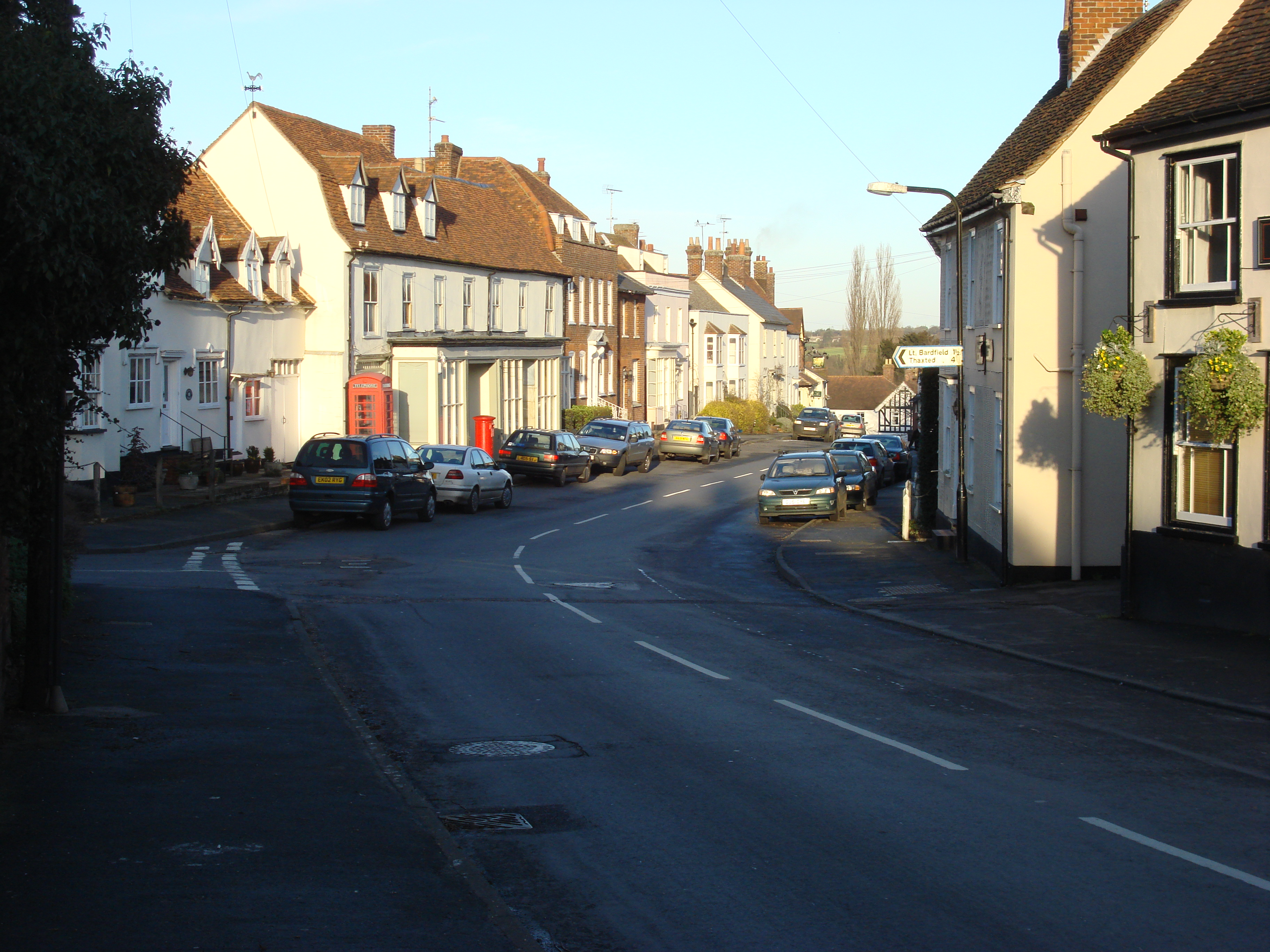

- Location within Essex
- Population: 1,374 (Parish, 2021)
- OS grid reference: TL675305
- District: Braintree
- Shire county: Essex
- Region: East
- Country: England
- Sovereign state: United Kingdom
- Post town: BRAINTREE
- Postcode district: CM7
- Dialling code: 01371
- Police: Essex
- Fire: Essex
- Ambulance: East of England

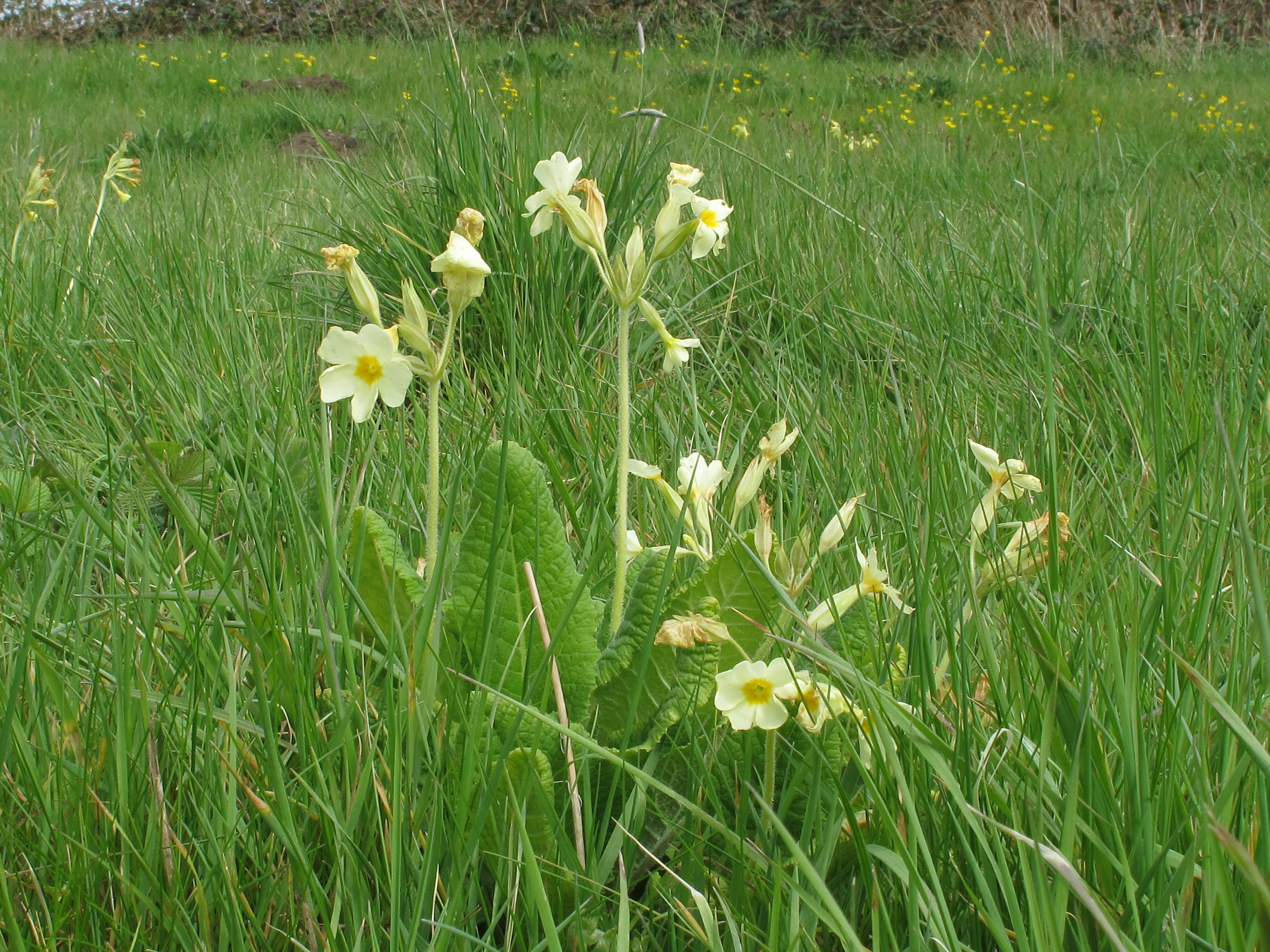
Oxlips in Piper's Meadow

Great Bardfield is a village and civil parish in the Braintree district of Essex, England. It is approximately 9 mi (14 km) northwest of the town of Braintree, and approximately 12 mi (19 km) southeast of Saffron Walden. At the 2021 census the parish had a population of 1,374.

The village came to national attention during the 1950s as home to the Great Bardfield Artists.

== History ==
Henry VIII is said to have given Bardfield to Anne of Cleves as part of his divorce settlement and a number of buildings in the village are associated with Anne of Cleves, including the Grade II-listed Great Lodge and its associated Grade I-listed barn, now named after her. The 1,000-acre (4.0 km^{2}) grounds include a Grade I-listed barn and a vineyard. Great Bardfield is home to the Bardfield Cage, a 19th-century village lock-up, and the Gibraltar Mill, a windmill which has been converted to a house.

Great Bardfield played an important role in the history of the oxlip (Primula elatior) which, in the UK, is a rare plant only found where Suffolk, Essex and Cambridgeshire meet. Originally it was thought that oxlips were cowslip-primrose hybrids but in 1842 Henry Doubleday and Charles Darwin conducted tests on plants collected from Great Bardfield and concluded that this was not so. For a while the plant was known as the Bardfield Oxlip. The common cowslip-primrose hybrid is known as the false oxlip (Primula × polyantha).

== Great Bardfield Artists ==
Bardfield was the home of many important twentieth-century English artists who hosted a series of important 'open house' exhibitions in the village during the 1950s. These exhibitions garnered national press attention and attracted thousands of visitors. The Great Bardfield Artists of the 1940s and 1950s were: John Aldridge, Edward Bawden, George Chapman, Stanley Clifford-Smith, Audrey Cruddas, Walter Hoyle, Tirzah Garwood, Michael Rothenstein, Eric Ravilious (who lodged with Bawden at Brick House), Sheila Robinson and Marianne Straub. Other artists linked to the art community include Joan Glass, Duffy Ayers, Laurence Scarfe and the political cartoonist David Low.

== Other notable people ==
- The 14th-century judge in Ireland, William of Bardfield, was born in the village in around 1258, the son of a local householder, Walter of Bardfield.
- William Bendlowes (1516–1584), Serjeant-at-Law to Mary I and Elizabeth I
- Early 20th-century Liberal candidate in several local constituencies, Ernest William Tanner.
- Artist Grayson Perry spent part of his childhood in the village, and worked for a while as the local paperboy.
- Alan Jordan, former Sheriff of Essex and the founder of Great Bardfield vineyard.
- Arthur Lindsay Sadler, Professor of Oriental Studies (1922–48) at the University of Sydney, spent his retirement in the village
- Sir Christopher Sibthorpe (died 1632), judge in Ireland and religious polemicist, and his brother Robert Sibthorp, Bishop of Limerick, were born in the village.

== Village events ==
Each year there is a village garage sale.

== See also ==
The Hundred Parishes

== Gallery ==
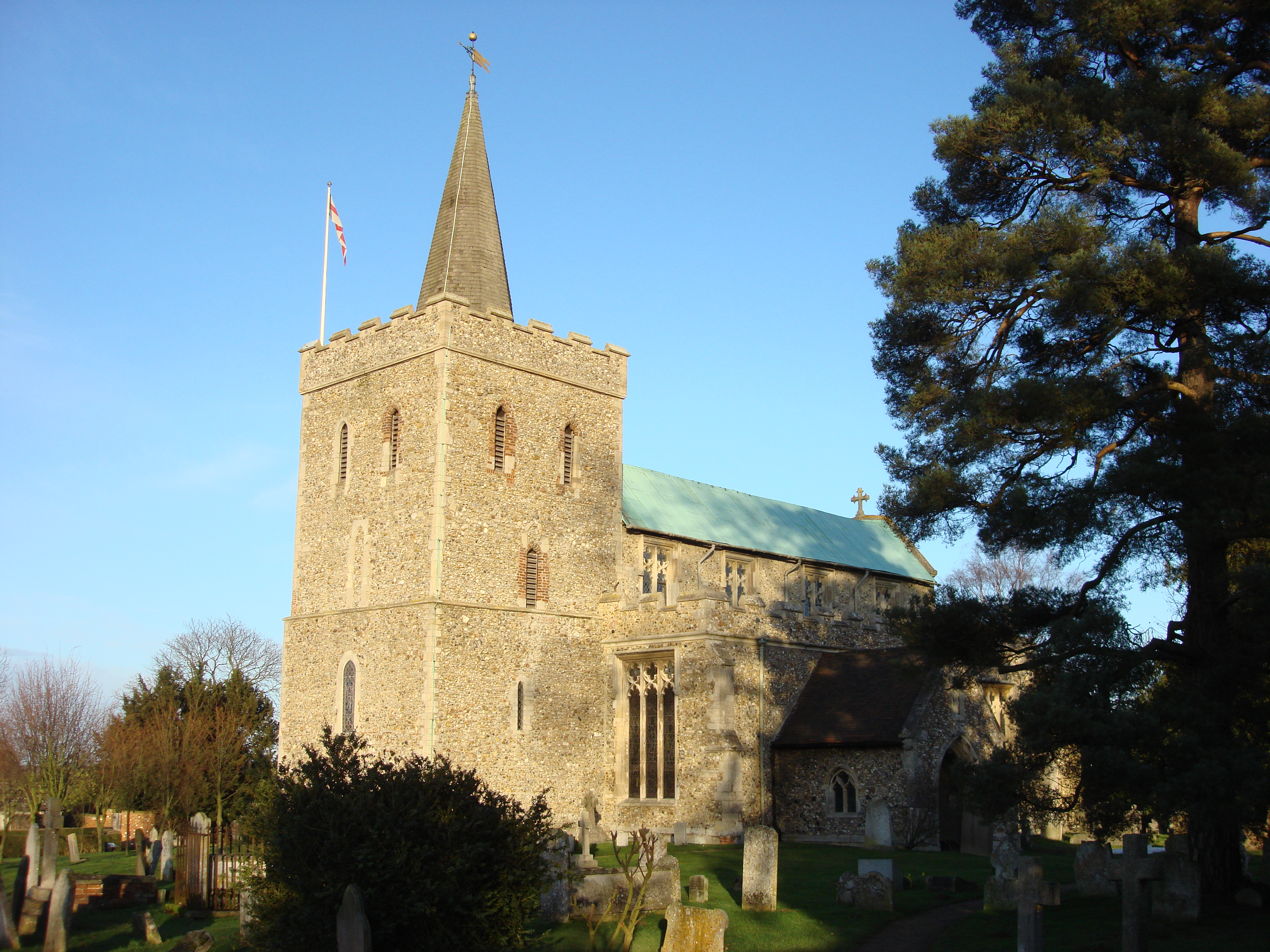
The church of St. Mary the Virgin

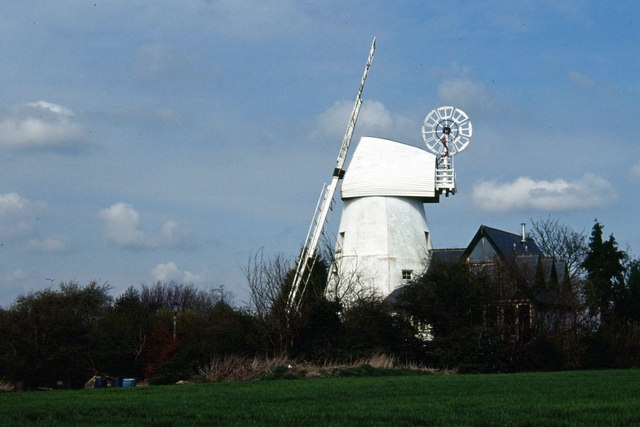
Gibraltar Mill

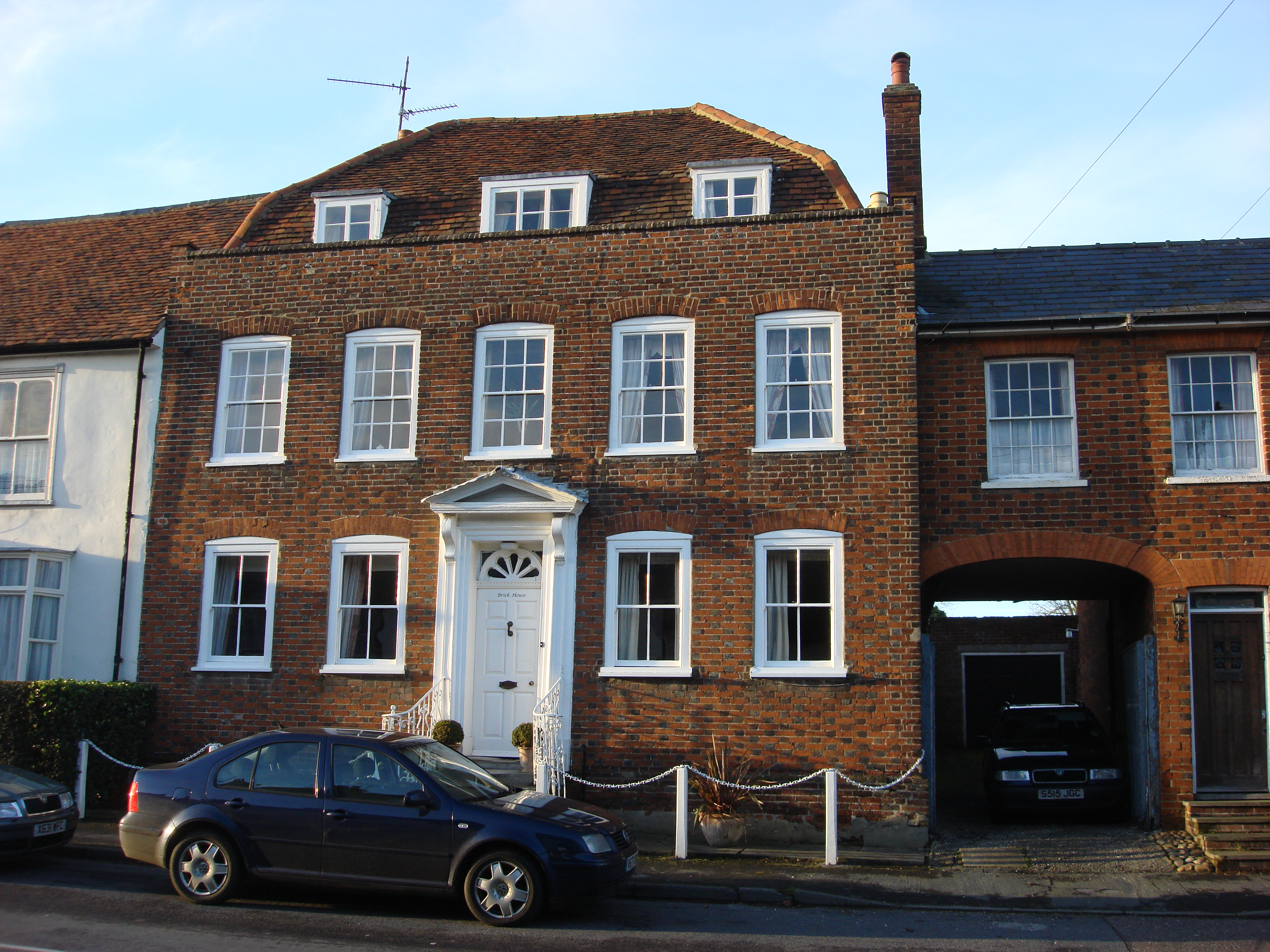
Brick House, Great Bardfield, home of Edward Bawden (1903–1989).
