= Great Bardfield Artists =

Mid-20th-century artist community, based in the English village of Great Bardfield

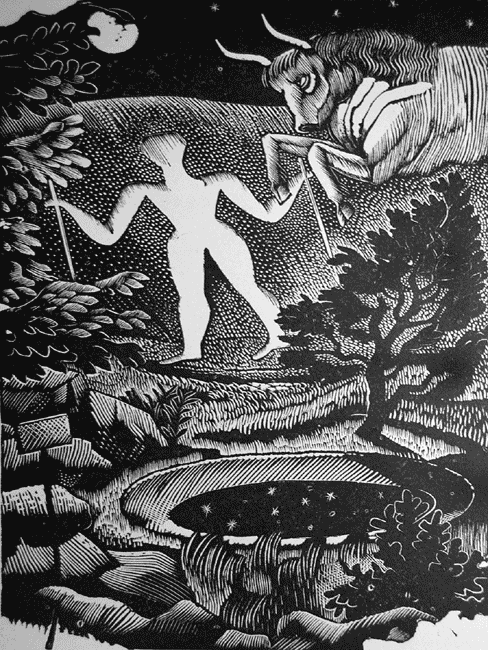
May, woodcut of the Long Man of Wilmington by Eric Ravilious

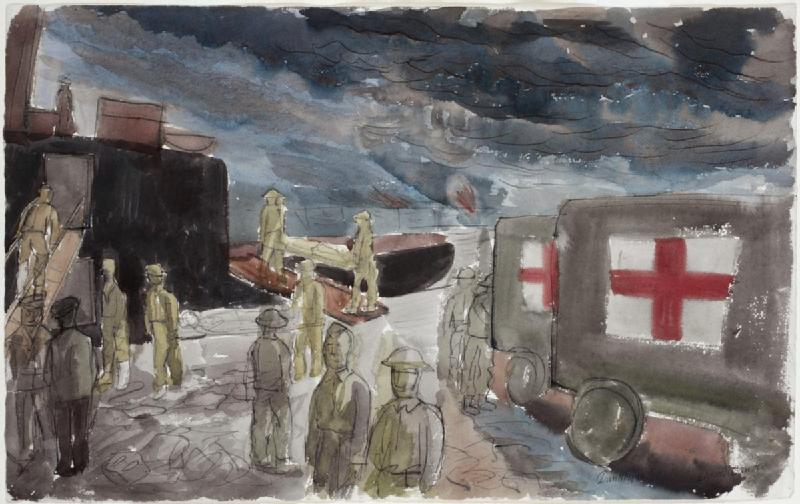
Edward Bawden's Dunkirk – Embarkation of Wounded, May 1940 Imperial War Museum

The Great Bardfield Artists were a community of artists who lived in Great Bardfield, a village in north west Essex, England, during the middle years of the 20th century.

The principal artists who lived there between 1930 and 1970 were John Aldridge RA, Edward Bawden, George Chapman, Stanley Clifford-Smith, Audrey Cruddas, Walter Hoyle, Eric Ravilious, Sheila Robinson, Michael Rothenstein, Kenneth Rowntree and Marianne Straub. Other artists associated with the group include Duffy Ayers, John Bolam, Bernard Cheese, Tirzah Garwood, Joan Glass, David Low and Laurence Scarfe. Great Bardfield Artists were diverse in style but shared a love for figurative art, making the group distinct from the better known St Ives School of artists in St Ives, Cornwall, who, after the war, were chiefly dominated by abstractionists.

During the 1950s the Great Bardfield Artists organised a series of large 'open house' exhibitions which attracted national and international press attention. Positive reviews and the novelty of viewing modernist art works in the artists' own homes led to thousands visiting the remote village during the summer exhibitions of 1954, 1955 and 1958. As well as these large shows the Great Bardfield Artists held exhibitions of their work in Cambridge (1956) and Bristol (1959). The artists also organised a multi-city tour of England and Ireland during 1957 and 1958. The early 1960s saw the majority of the Great Bardfield artists leave the village.

== Legacy ==
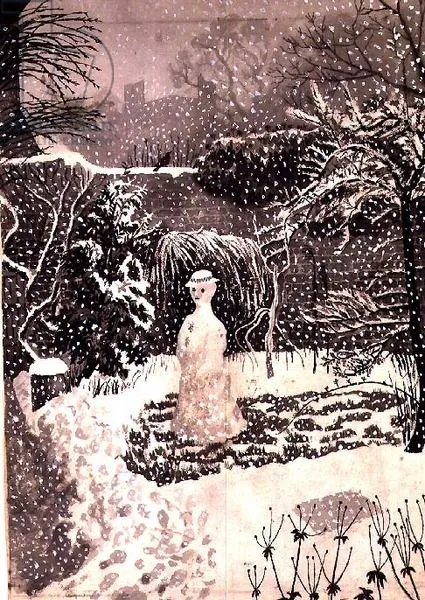
Tirzah Garwood - Woodcut - Snow Woman

In 1985, the Fry Art Gallery was established in Saffron Walden with the expressed aim of highlighting the paintings, prints, wallpapers, books, fabrics and ceramics made by the Great Bardfield art community between 1930 and 1970. Many of the artists have had exhibitions at the Fry Art Gallery and elsewhere.
