= Michael Rothenstein =

English painter (1908–1993)

William Michael Rothenstein RA (19 March 1908 – 6 July 1993) was a British printmaker, painter and art teacher.

== Early life ==
Born in Hampstead, London, on 19 March 1908, he was the youngest of four children born to the celebrated artist, Sir William Rothenstein and his wife Alice Knewstub.

== Art ==
He was home schooled and studied art at Chelsea Polytechnic and later at the Central School of Arts and Crafts. Affected by lingering depression, Rothenstein did little art making during the late 1920s and early 1930s. Despite this, he had his first one-man show at the Warren Gallery, London in 1931.

During the late 1930s the artist's output was mainly Neo-Romantic landscapes. In 1940 he was commissioned to paint topographical watercolours of endangered sites in Sussex for the Recording Britain project funded by the Pilgrim Trust. The artist held his first (of many) one-man shows at the famous Redfern Gallery, London in 1942. During this time he became increasingly fascinated by printmaking.

In the early 1940s Rothenstein moved to Ethel House, in the north Essex village of Great Bardfield. At Great Bardfield there was a small resident art community that included John Aldridge, Edward Bawden and Kenneth Rowntree. In the early 1950s several more artists (including George Chapman, Stanley Clifford-Smith, Audrey Cruddas and Marianne Straub) moved to the village making it one of the most artistically creative spots in Britain. Rothenstein took an important role in organising the Great Bardfield Artists exhibitions during the 1950s. Thanks to his contacts in the art world (his older brother, Sir John Rothenstein, was the current head of the Tate Gallery) these exhibitions became nationally known and attracted thousands of visitors.

From the mid-1950she almost abandoned painting in preference to printmaking which included linocut as well as etchings. Like his fellow Bardfield artists his work was figurative but became near abstract in the 1960s.

Although little known as a painter, Rothenstein became one of the most experimental printmakers in Britain during the 1950s and '60s. He authored several books on art subjects including Looking at Painting (1947) and Frontiers of Printmaking (1966). In 1965 he was the driving force behind the formation of Printmakers Council and served as its first chairman. He taught art for many years at Camberwell School of Art and Stoke-on-Trent College of Art, and he also lectured extensively in the USA. He illustrated several books including the first UK edition of John Steinbeck's Of Mice and Men (1937) and Acquainted with the Night: A Book of Dreams (1949) by Nancy Price.

Rothenstein was elected an Associate of the Royal Academy (ARA) in 1977 and a Royal Academician (RA) in 1984. Near the end of his life there was a retrospective of his work at the Stoke-on-Trent City Museum and Art Gallery (1989) and important shows followed at the Fry Art Gallery, Essex (1991 and 1993).

== Legacy ==
His work is included in several public collections including the Tate Gallery (London), Victoria and Albert Museum (London), and the Fry Art Gallery (Saffron Walden).

In 1974, the one-man show 'Violence and the Studio Process' was held in The Minories, Colchester.

== Personal life ==
In 1936 he married his first wife, the artist, Betty Fitzgerald, who was later known as Duffy Ayers, and the couple had two children. In 1956 he divorced Duffy and in 1958 married Diana Arnold-Forster. Not long after the 1958 Great Bardfield summer exhibition the couple moved to the nearby village of Stisted, Essex. She died in 2017.
