= Chloë Cheese =

English illustrator, painter and print-maker

Chloë Cheese (born 1952) is an English illustrator, painter and print-maker. She was raised among the Great Bardfield Artists community and studied at the Cambridge School of Art and at the Royal College of Art.

== Biography ==
Cheese was born in 1952 in London. She was the daughter of artist and printmaker Bernard Cheese (1925–2013) and artist and illustrator Sheila Robinson (1925–1988), both of whom worked in the commercial illustration trade. Her childhood was spent in Great Bardfield, Essex, where her parents were among a group known as the Great Bardfield Artists.

Cheese studied at the Cambridge School of Art (now Anglia Ruskin University) and at the Royal College of Art (RCA). After graduating, Cheese briefly worked as an usherette, before becoming a freelance illustrator and producing prints at the Curwen Studio and in Paris.

Cheese works in a variety of mediums (watercolours, gouache, and printmaking) and her style is characterised by both bold colours and intricate patterns. She draws inspiration for her works, urban life and from her travels to Venice or from setting up objects for table top still life.

Examples of her work are held in several public collections including those of The Arts Council of Great Britain, Tate Britain, Victoria and Albert Museum, and the Museum of London. The Fry Art Gallery in Saffron Walden holds many of her works, as well as those of her father.

In 1985, the British Council included Cheese's work, and her name, in a travelling exhibition titled: "British Illustration from Caxton to Chloë". She also exhibits with The St. Jude's print collective, the Emma Mason Gallery and the Hayletts Gallery.

In 2012, Cheese was commissioned by the UK Parliament's Works of Art Committee for their Jubilee Series and produced the work The Vote Office.

Cheese has also illustrated books including Antonio Carluccio's A Passion for Pasta (1993, BBC Books: ISBN 0563362545) and Walking the Bridge of your Nose, a children's poetry book selected by Michael Rosen (1994, Kingfisher Books: ISBN 1856972909). She has also contributed to the book Bawden, Ravilious and the Artists of Great Bardfield, which tells the story of Great Bardfield and its artists community, and was published by the Victoria and Albert Museum.
