= Duffy Ayers =

English portrait painter (1915–2017)

- Born: Betty Mona Desmond FitzGerald; 19 September 1915; Great Missenden, Buckinghamshire, England
- Died: 10 November 2017 (aged 102)
- Other names: Betty Fitzgerald, Duffy Rothenstein
- Education: Central School of Art
- Occupation: Portrait painter
- Spouse(s): Michael Rothenstein, Eric Ayers
- Children: Julian Rothenstein, Anne Rothenstein
- Relatives: William Rothenstein (father-in-law), Desmond FitzGerald (uncle)

Betty Mona Desmond Ayers (née FitzGerald; 19 September 1915 – 10 November 2017), known as Duffy Ayers, was an English portrait painter. She was known for most of her life by the nickname "Duffy".

Born in Great Missenden, Buckinghamshire, one of a pair of identical twin girls of an American mother and an Irish father, William FitzGerald, the brother of the politician and poet Desmond FitzGerald, she trained at the Central School of Art in London, and later married the painter and printmaker Michael Rothenstein RA, son of William Rothenstein. In 1941 the couple moved to Chapel Cottage in the Essex village of Great Bardfield, and relocated the next year to Ethel House in the centre of the village. Duffy and Michael were important members of the famous art community which lived in the north Essex village during the post-war period. At Great Bardfield she was mainly known as Duffy Rothenstein, although she still painted under the name of Betty Fitzgerald. The Rothensteins, along with other village artists, organised a series of large open-house exhibitions that garnered much press attention during the 1950s. During this time Duffy painted mostly portraits, and exhibited some of her work at the 1955 Great Bardfield Artists’ summer exhibition.

By the end of 1955 her marriage to Michael Rothenstein had dissolved, and she left Great Bardfield. She settled in Bloomsbury, London, and married Eric Ayers (1921–2001), a graphic artist. After her second marriage she painted under the name of Duffy Ayers, and regularly exhibited at the Royal Academy. One of her oil portraits, "The Arrival" (1993) is in the North West Essex collection of the Fry Art Gallery, Saffron Walden.

Ayers latterly lived in London, and had two children from her first marriage: Julian Rothenstein (owner of Redstone Press) and Anne Rothenstein (b. 1949), artist and wife of film-director Stephen Frears.

== Last years ==
Duffy Ayers turned 100 in September 2015 and died in November 2017 at the age of 102.

== Sources ==
- Martin Salisbury, Artists of the Fry: Art and Design in the North West Essex Collection, Cambridge: Ruskin Press, 2003.
- "Artists of Great Bardfield", Hearts and Essex Observer, 15 July 1955.
