= Redstone Press =

British publishing company

- Founded: 1986; 39 years ago
- Founder: Julian Rothenstein
- Country of origin: United Kingdom
- Headquarters location: London
- Publication types: Books
- Official website: www.theredstoneshop.com

Redstone Press is a London-based art book publisher that was founded in 1986 by Julian Rothenstein, the son of English portrait painter Duffy Ayers and her first husband, the painter and printmaker Michael Rothenstein. Publisher Julian Rothenstein, who has been called "a one-man art movement", is also the press's editor and designer.

== History ==
The first Redstone Press book was of drawings by the publisher's father as a child prodigy in 1912–17, entitled Drawing Book. In the words of Eye magazine: "A softbound book in a black paper portfolio, it was beautiful and quirky, perfectly pitched to delight eye and mind together. The same qualities have distinguished Redstone's subsequent output." Other early productions include visual books in boxes, such as Frans Masereel's Passionate Journey (1988), a novel told in 165 woodcuts, with an Introduction by Thomas Mann; Images of Frida Kahlo with an introduction by Angela Carter; and Osip Mandelstam's Journey to Armenia with an introduction by Bruce Chatwin.

The Redstone Diary, started in 1989, is now considered a "cult product", with Ian Sansom writing in The Guardian: "There may be no great diarists, then, but there are still great diaries. By far the best is the legendary Redstone Diary….In the midst of one's self-obsessions, the Redstone Diary reminds one of other worlds." It is an annual spiral-bound desk diary that "usually delivers a quirky collection of literary and graphic ephemera based around a single theme, such as ‘Daring!’ (2003), ‘The Artist’s World’ (2011) and ‘The Senses' (2012)."

Self-defined as "the publishers of surprising books and games", Redstone Press have published numerous books on psychology, including Psychobox (with an introduction by Jonathan Miller), Psychogames, The Redstone Inkblot Test and Psychobook (with an introduction by Lionel Shriver). Other titles include The Blind Photographer (2016), a compilation co-edited by Rothenstein with Mel Gooding, that was described as "the first of its kind" by World of Interiors, whose review concluded: "Summing up the book’s lucid, generous ethos is a quote by Stevie Wonder, placed on its cover. 'Visions are not seen purely by the eyes but through the spirit.' The Blind Photographer, challenging our assumptions, shows that blindness does not stop sight."

More recently, Redstone published the book Black Lives 1900: W.E.B. Du Bois at the Paris Exposition (accompanying an exhibition at the House of Illustration from 8 November 2019 to 1 March 2020, curated by Paul Goodwin and Katie McCurrach, featuring the pioneering infographics of W. E. B. Du Bois from the 1900 Paris Exposition), edited by Julian Rothenstein, and with an Introduction by Jacqueline Francis and Stephen G. Hall, a Foreword by David Adjaye and contribution from Henry Louis Gates Jr. According to the review in Black History Month magazine, "Black Lives is a book of black history that has contemporary relevance to the black lives of people across the globe."
