= Gibraltar Mill, Great Bardfield =

Windmill in Great Bardfield, Essex, England

Great Bardfield Mill
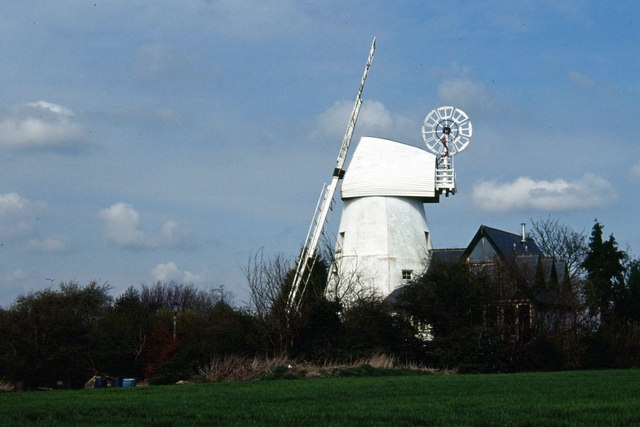
- The mill in April 2006

Origin
- Mill name: Gibraltar Mill
- Mill location: TL 68004 30727
- Coordinates: 51°56′59″N 0°26′35″E
- Operator(s): Private
- Year built: c1704

Information
- Purpose: Corn mill
- Type: Tower mill
- Storeys: Three storeys
- No. of sails: Four sails
- Type of sails: Double Patent sails
- Windshaft: Cast iron
- Winding: Fantail
- Fantail blades: Eight blades
- No. of pairs of millstones: Two pairs

Gibraltar Mill is a grade II listed Tower mill at Great Bardfield, Essex, England which has been converted to residential use.

== History ==
The first date at which a windmill is definitely known to have been standing here is 1707. A date of 1680 is given by some sources, but no mill was marked on Ogilby and Morgan's map of 1678. It cannot be proved or disproved that a mill was standing here in 1680. The most likely date of erection of Gibraltar Mill is 1704. A possible scenario being an earlier mill having been blown down in the Great Storm of 1703 and the present mill replacing it. By 1754, the mill had been converted to a cottage. The mill was put back to work as a windmill by 1806, when it was insured for £300, having only been insured for £50 in 1800. The mill was worked in conjunction with the nearby Great Bardfield Watermill at various times. A new cast iron windshaft was fitted in 1877, replacing the former wooden one. It was cast by Christy and Norris, millwrights of Chelmsford and fitted by Sillitoe and Brewer, millwrights of Long Melford, Suffolk. In January 1899, the sails were blown off and the cap severely damaged when the mill was tailwinded. The mill stood capless until 1904, when a new cap and sails were fitted, and a fantail added to replace the former internal winch winding system. The mill was working until 1930 It was threatened with demolition in 1938, but Essex County Council used their powers under the Town and Country Planning Act, 1932 to prevent demolition. After the death of the last miller in the late 1950s it was stripped of machinery and house converted. One of the sails was damaged in the Great Storm of 1987.

== Description ==
Gibraltar Mill is an underpowered three-storey tower mill with a boat-shaped cap. The mill has four double Patent sails carried on a cast-iron windshaft and is winded by an eight-bladed fantail. The tower is 3 feet 6 inches (1.07 m) to 4 feet (1.22 m) thick at base level. It is 32 feet (9.75 m) high, 20 feet (6.10 m) diameter at base level and 13 feet (3.96 m) diameter at curb level. The mill is 44 feet (13.41 m) high overall. The windshaft carries a wooden Brake Wheel with 90 iron teeth, cast in six segments. The Wallower was an iron mortice gear, with 44 wooden cogs. It was carried on a cast-iron Upright Shaft. The Great Spur Wheel had 88 cogs, and drove two pairs of millstones via Stone Nuts with 18 cogs each.

== Millers ==
- Jonas Osbourne 1754
- Thomas Joslin 1767 - 1792
- John Joslin 1800 - 1803
- John Brown 1803 - 1809
- Thomas Marriage
- Henry Marriage - 1855
- Thomas Dixon Smith 1872 - 1878
- Thomas Samuel Smith 1894–1930

References for above:-
