= Francis Gibson (banker) =

English banker (1805–1858)

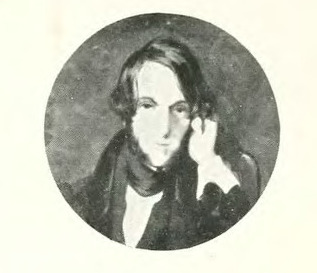
- Born: 5 March 1805; Saffron Walden
- Died: 19 December 1858
- Spouse: Elizabeth Pease
- Father: Atkinson Francis Gibson

Francis Gibson (1805-1858), was a British banker and businessman.

== Early life ==
He was born in Saffron Walden, Essex, the son of the banker Atkinson Francis Gibson (1763-1829).

== Career ==
Soon after his marriage, Gibson became a director of the Stockton and Darlington Railway. Soon afterwards, he was one of the four Quaker founders of Middlesbrough.

Although still base in Saffron Walden, Gibson and his wife spent two months every summer in County Durham and bought a house there, Balder Grange, in 1843. The Victorian house is close to Cotherstone and overlooks the River Balder.

== Personal life ==
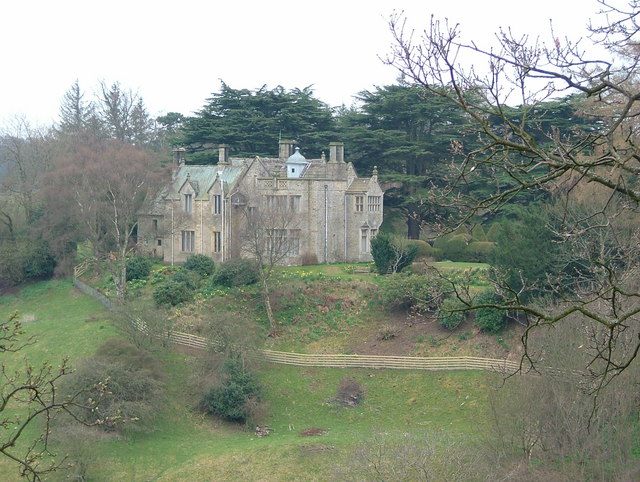
Balder Grange

On 7 May 1829, he married Elizabeth Pease, the youngest daughter of Edward Pease, "the father of the railways". He enjoyed painting and, late in life, he built the Fry Art Gallery (1856), in Saffron Walden.

They had two children:

- Elizabeth Pease Gibson (1830-1870). She married the Quaker lawyer, politician and philanthropist Lewis Fry (1832-1921)
- Francis Edward Gibson (1831-1862). He died of apoplexy in Florence, Italy.
