= Richard Bawden =

English painter, printmaker and designer (1936–2024)

- Born: 18 March 1936
- Died: 31 May 2024 (aged 88)
- Education: Royal College of Art
- Known for: Painting, printmaking, illustration, design
- Notable work: The Birdwatcher II, London Transport posters, etched church windows

Richard Bawden (18 March 1936 – 31 May 2024) was an English painter, printmaker and designer with a graphic, linear quality. His work includes book illustration, murals, etched glass church windows and doors, posters, mosaic and furniture.

His work is in the collections of London Transport, the Tate Gallery and V&A Museum.

The son of artist Edward Bawden, he was based in Suffolk. Richard Bawden died on 31 May 2024, at the age of 88.
