= St Mary Abchurch =

Church in the City of London, England

Coordinates: 51°30′42.02″N 0°5′18.05″W

St. Mary Abchurch
- Guild and Ward Church of Saint Mary Abchurch
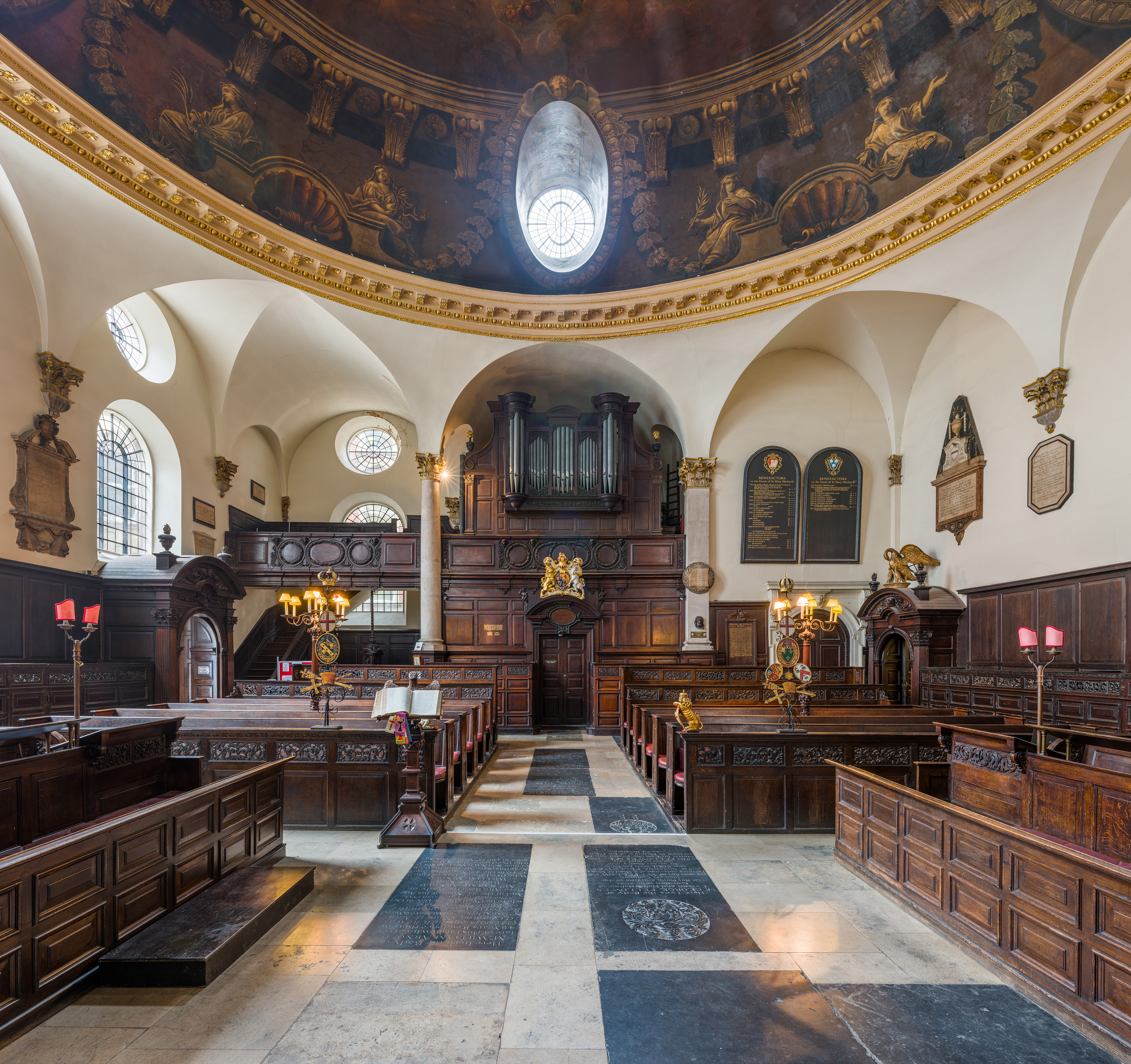
- The interior of St Mary Abchurch

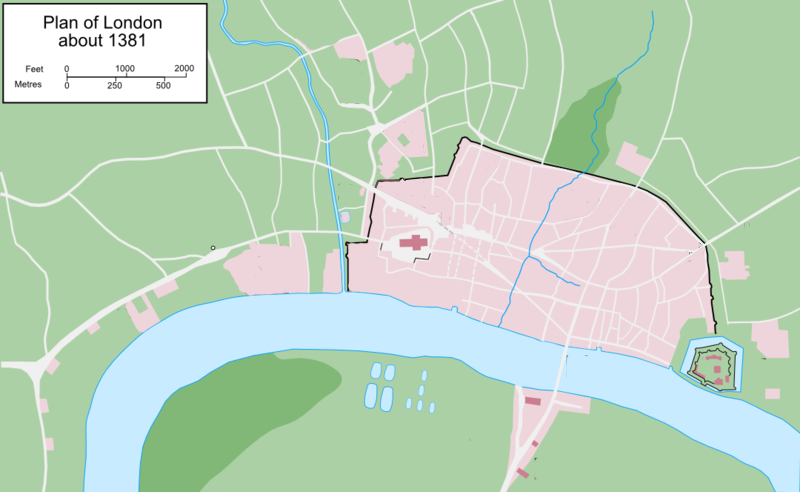
- Location within City of London Location within City of London in 1300
- Location: Abchurch Yard, City of London, EC3
- Country: England
- Language: English
- Denomination: Church of England
- Previous denomination: Roman Catholic (to 1538)
- Churchmanship: Traditional Catholic
- Website: stmaryabchurch.org.uk

History
- Founded: 12th century
- Dedication: Mary, mother of Jesus

Architecture
- Heritage designation: Grade I listed building
- Architect: Sir Christopher Wren
- Style: English Baroque
- Years built: 1681–87 (rebuilt after the Great Fire of London, 1666)

Administration
- Parish: St Mary Abchurch and St Laurence Pountney

St Mary Abchurch is a Church of England church off Cannon Street in the City of London. Dedicated to the Blessed Virgin Mary, it is first mentioned in 1198–1199. The medieval church was destroyed in the Great Fire of London in 1666, and replaced by the present building.

== History ==
=== Medieval church ===
The church dates back to the twelfth century and is dedicated to the Virgin Mary. The additional name "Abchurch" probably comes from the name of an early incumbent. An obsolete suggestion is that it is a variant of "Upchurch", referring to its position on comparatively high ground; this is unsupported by the early spellings.

The patronage of the church belonged to the convent of St Mary Overy, Southwark, until around 1455, when it passed to the master and chaplains of the college of Corpus Christi at the church of St Laurence Pountney. After the Reformation, Archbishop Parker persuaded Elizabeth I to grant the church to his college, Corpus Christi College, Cambridge, which has appointed the incumbent ever since.

"Restored and beautified" in 1611 at the cost of the parishioners, St Mary's was destroyed in the Great Fire of London of 1666.

=== Rebuilding ===
The church was rebuilt by Sir Christopher Wren, or under his aegis, in 1681–1686. The parish was united with that of the nearby church of St Laurence Pontney, also destroyed in the Great Fire but not rebuilt.

=== Wartime damage and repair ===
A bomb hit the church in September 1940 during the London Blitz. The greatest damage was to the dome. W. Godfrey Allen repaired the church between 1948 and 1953.

The dome was restored by E. W. Tristan, and work on it was completed after his death in 1952 by the artist Walter Hoyle. Many sources describe the reredos as having been shattered into many pieces by the bombing and then carefully restored. In fact it was removed from the church by order of the church wardens, and kept in a place of safety for the duration of the war. The church was designated a Grade I listed building on 4 January 1950.

== Exterior ==
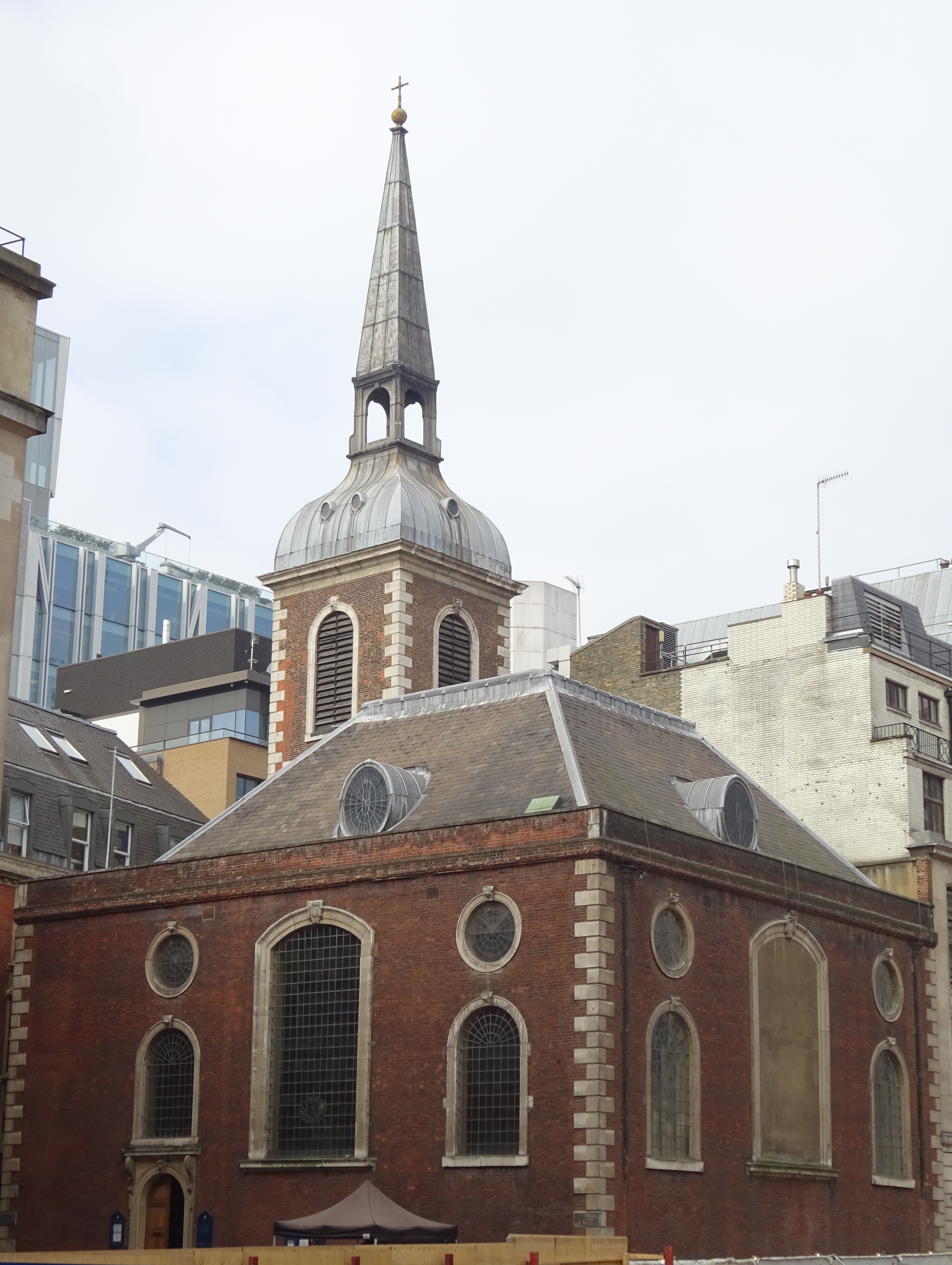
St Mary Abchurch (looking across empty site of 135 Cannon Street)

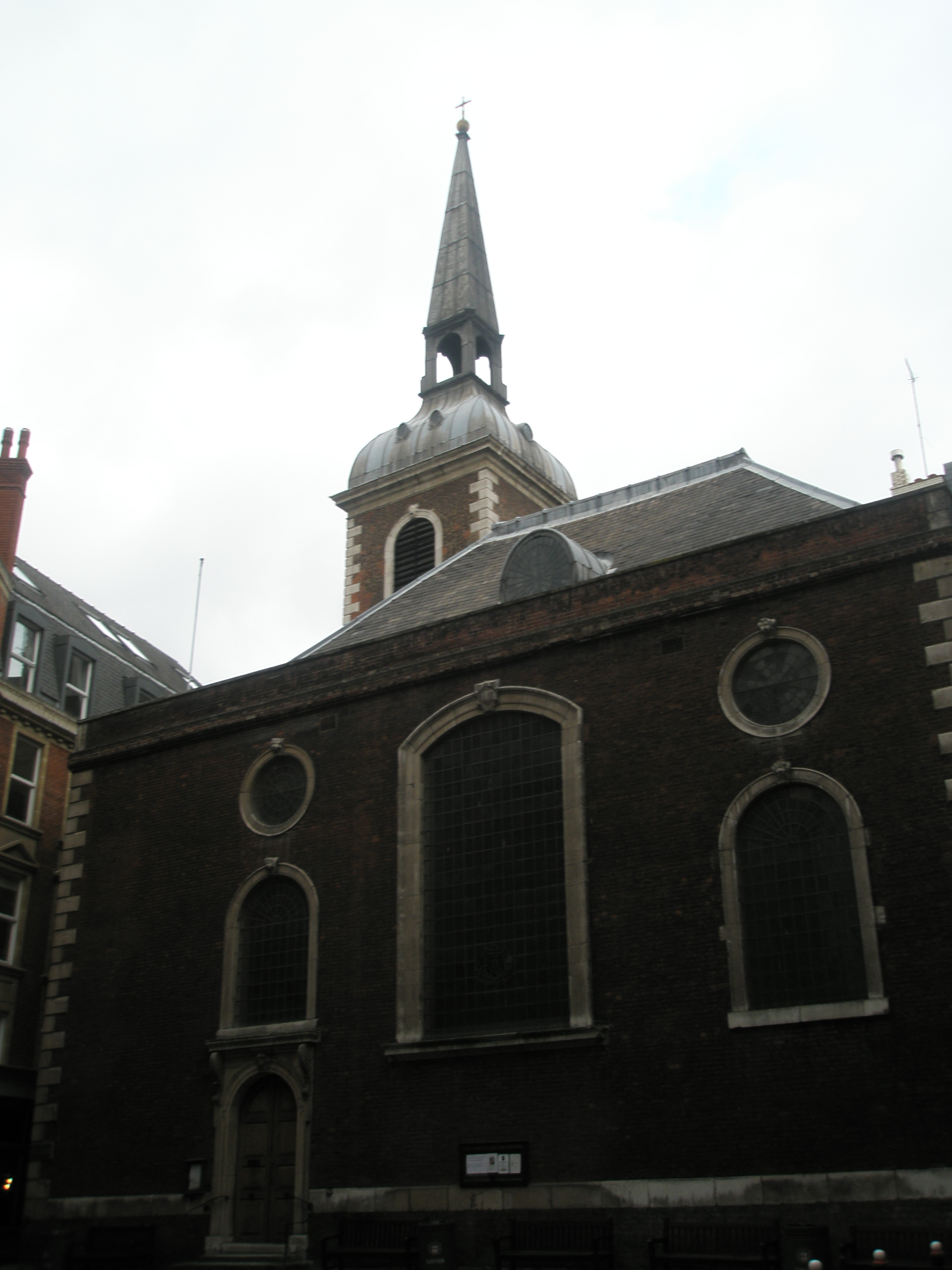
The tower and leaded spire of St. Mary Abchurch

The church has a red brick exterior with stone dressings. There is a four-storey, 51-foot-high tower with a leaded spire. The church was originally intended to be much larger, with a structure similar to St. Stephen Walbrook; however for reasons unknown it was rebuilt on a smaller scale under the supervision of Robert Hooke.

== Interior ==
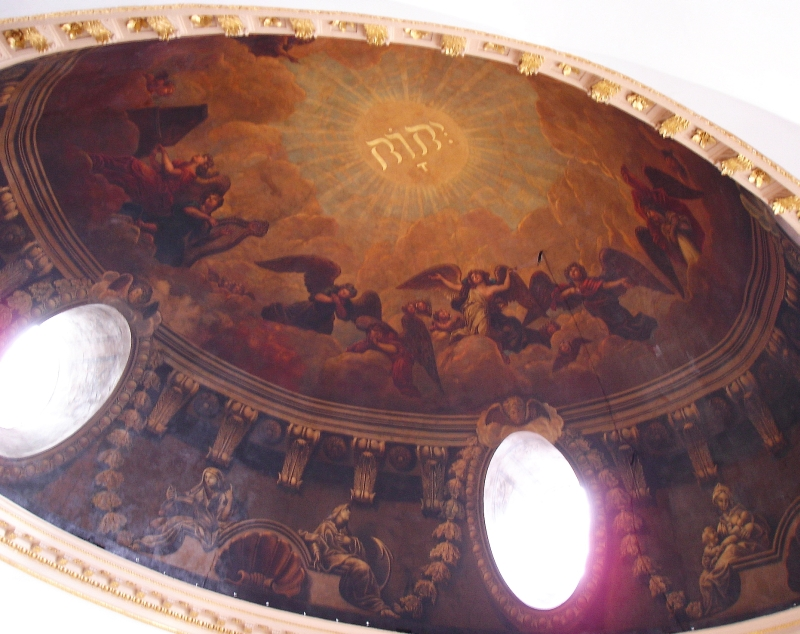
Painted interior of dome

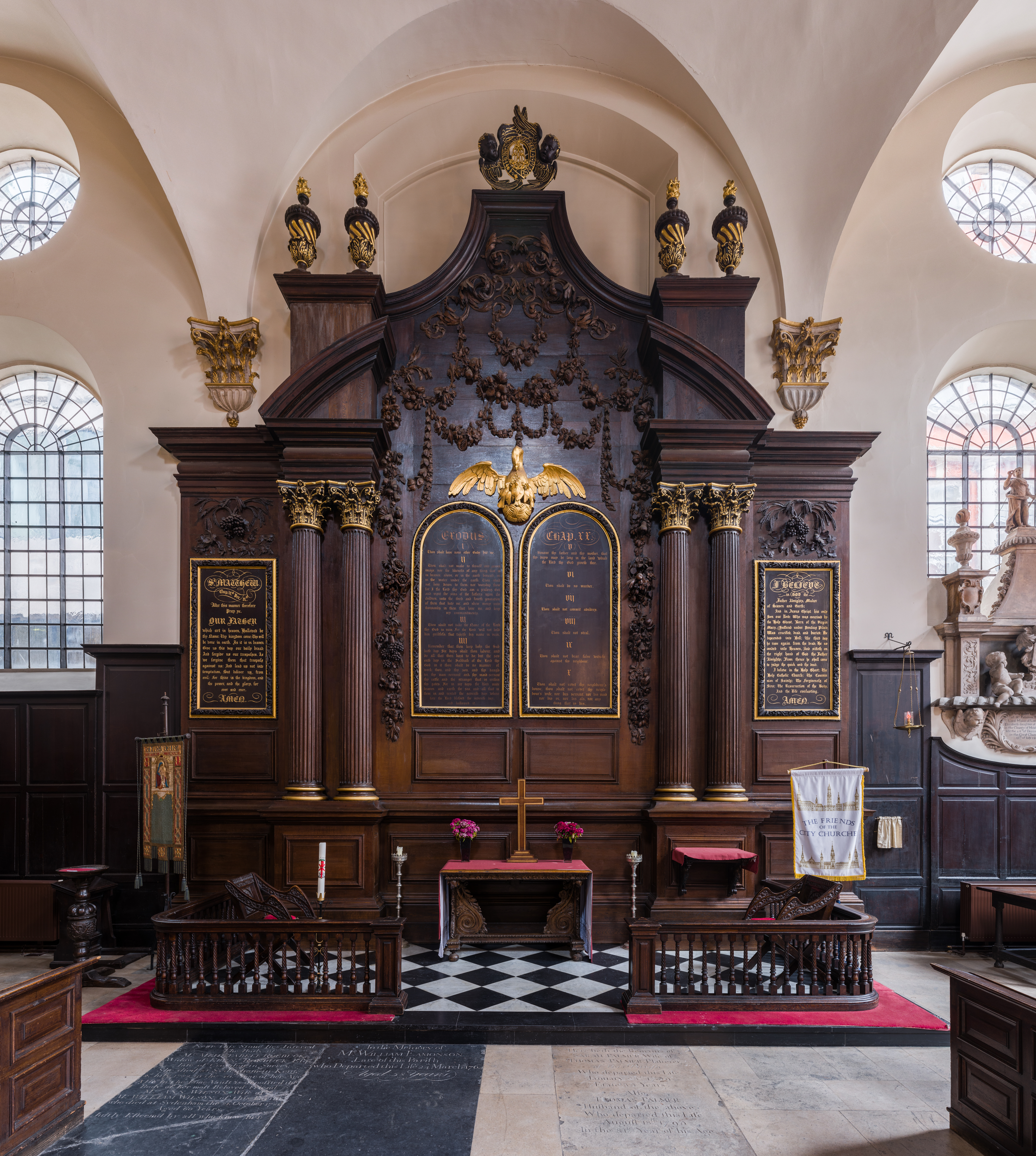
Grinling Gibbons' altar-piece

The ceiling of the church takes the form of a dished cupola pierced by four elliptical openings, which become almost circular externally in the dormer windows. The cupola springs from four plain brick walls, has no external thrusts, and spans more than forty feet across. It was painted with the present decorative scheme in 1708, when the whole church went under repair and beautification. The artist was almost certainly William Snow, a member of the Painter-Stainers' Company, who lived in a house just to the north of the church; the church's accounts from the time list payments totalling £170 to a "Mr Snow", without, however, specifying the services rendered. Painted in oils directly on the plaster, the decorations are divided in two horizontally by a painted Trompe-l'œil cornice. Above this a choir of angels and cherubs in adoration surrounds a golden glow, in the centre of which it the name of God in Hebrew characters. Below it are eight seated female figures painted in monochrome in imitation of sculpture; their precise symbolism has been variously interpreted. The painting was restored once in the 18th century and twice in the 19th. before the complete rebuild and repainting of the decorations following the end of the Second World War.

The pulpit is by William Grey, and the door cases, a font cover, rails and Royal Arms are by William Emmett. Its grand altar-piece is by Grinling Gibbons. Gibbons' original bill for what he called the 'Olter Pees' was rediscovered in the Guildhall Library in 1946. The motif of the gilded 'Pelican in her piety' (the emblem of Corpus Christi College, Cambridge) makes its appearance both on the reredos and in the original copper weathervane made by Robert Bird, which was relocated to sit over the north door after being removed from the spire for safety reasons. Also to be seen there are original high box pews on three sides of the church. The church was without an organ until 1822, when public subscription allowed one to be built by J.C. Bishop. This sustained serious bomb damage during the Second World War and a new organ was made by N. P. Mander in the 1950s, using the 1717 organ casing once belonging to All Hallows, Bread Street.

The remains of the former Lord Mayor of London Peter Perchard and his family are buried at St Mary Abchurch.

"This is one of Wren's happiest, outside and in...everything inside this apparently demure box is a little bit larger than life and has room to breathe - whereas an Italian designer of the same time would have crammed in twice as much detail and blurred the effect"

— Ian Nairn, Nairn's London

== See also ==
- List of churches and cathedrals of London
- List of Christopher Wren churches in London
