= John Bolam =

British painter (1922–2009)

John Bolam (1922–2009) was a British post war artist.

== Background ==
John Bolam was born in 1922 in Amersham, Buckinghamshire. He originally studied painting at Hornsey School of Art and furniture design at High Wycombe School of Art. From 1970 to 1983 Bolam was Head of the School of Art at Cambridge College of Arts and Technology.

== Work ==
John Bolam is seen by many as following in the path of the neo-Romantics, most notably John Piper and Graham Sutherland, but his imagery subsequently evolved independently. Bolam was also strongly influenced by French artists such as Braque and Degas as well as the English landscape, especially the Chilterns.

Exhibitions of Bolam's work have been held at AIA Galleries, Whitechapel Art Gallery, Arts Council Gallery, the Leicester Galleries and the New Art Centre (where he held a one-man show).

The major public collection of John Bolam's work is held at the Fry Art Gallery, Saffron Walden but his work also features in many important private art collections including those of Rank Xerox, Barclays Bank and Touche Ross.
