= Stuart Advertising Agency =

Stuart's Advertising Agency
- Industry: Advertising
- Founded: 1922; 104 years ago
- Founder: H. Stuart Menzies
- Headquarters: Kingsway, London, England

Stuart's Advertising Agency was, during the 1920s and 1930s, one of the leading London advertising agencies.

== History ==
Located at Kingsway House, Kingsway, the firm was founded in 1922 by H. Stuart Menzies. It had accounts with Elizabeth Arden, Keiller's marmalade, Shell-Mex & BP, Speedwriting, Crosse & Blackwell, Harper's Bazaar, Imperial Airways, Indian Trans-Continental Airways, Lewis Berger Paints, Toblerone and Qantas. Menzies retired in 1938-39 and moved first to Tahiti and later to Canada with his wife Elizabeth.

== Employees ==
Marcus Brumwell joined the firm in the early 1920s and became Managing Director when Menzies retired. Two other influential figures in the organisation in the late 1930s were D Lewis and the typographer/copywriter Robert Harling. While Menzies was an exceptional copywriter, Brumwell played a key role in liaising with leading contemporary artists of the time: Edward Bawden, Ben Nicholson, Edward McKnight Kauffer and Barbara Hepworth.

== Recognition ==
Stuart Advertising Agency is featured in the book Bright Ties Bold Ideas - Marcus Brumwell, Pioneer of C20 Advertising, Champion of the Artists by Joe Brumwell published in 2010 and entertaining a la carte by Mainstone Press, 2007.

== See also ==
- The Leith Agency
