= Walter Hoyle =

English artist (1922–2000)

Walter Hoyle (1922–2000) was an English artist, known for his prints, watercolours and illustration. He was a central figure in the Great Bardfield group of artists and a close associate of Edward Bawden. He taught at the Central School, London, and, for twenty years, at the Cambridge School of Art.

Walter Hoyle was youngest of four. He is the uncle to Susan Christine Hoyle and Great Uncle to Sally Christine Ward. Sally is now living in portslade East Sussex and Susan is now living in Spain.

== Early life and training ==
Walter Hoyle was born in Rishton, Lancashire in 1922. He studied at Beckenham School of Art from 1938 and took up a place at the Royal College of Art (RCA) in 1940. His studies were interrupted by war service as an army medical orderly from 1942. Following a prolonged demobilisation, he returned to the RCA in 1947.

In 1949, Hoyle took up a funded place to study mosaics at the Byzantine Institute of America in Istanbul, prompting an interest in Byzantine colour and design. On returning to the RCA for a post-graduate year, Hoyle met Edward Bawden who became a friend and major influence.

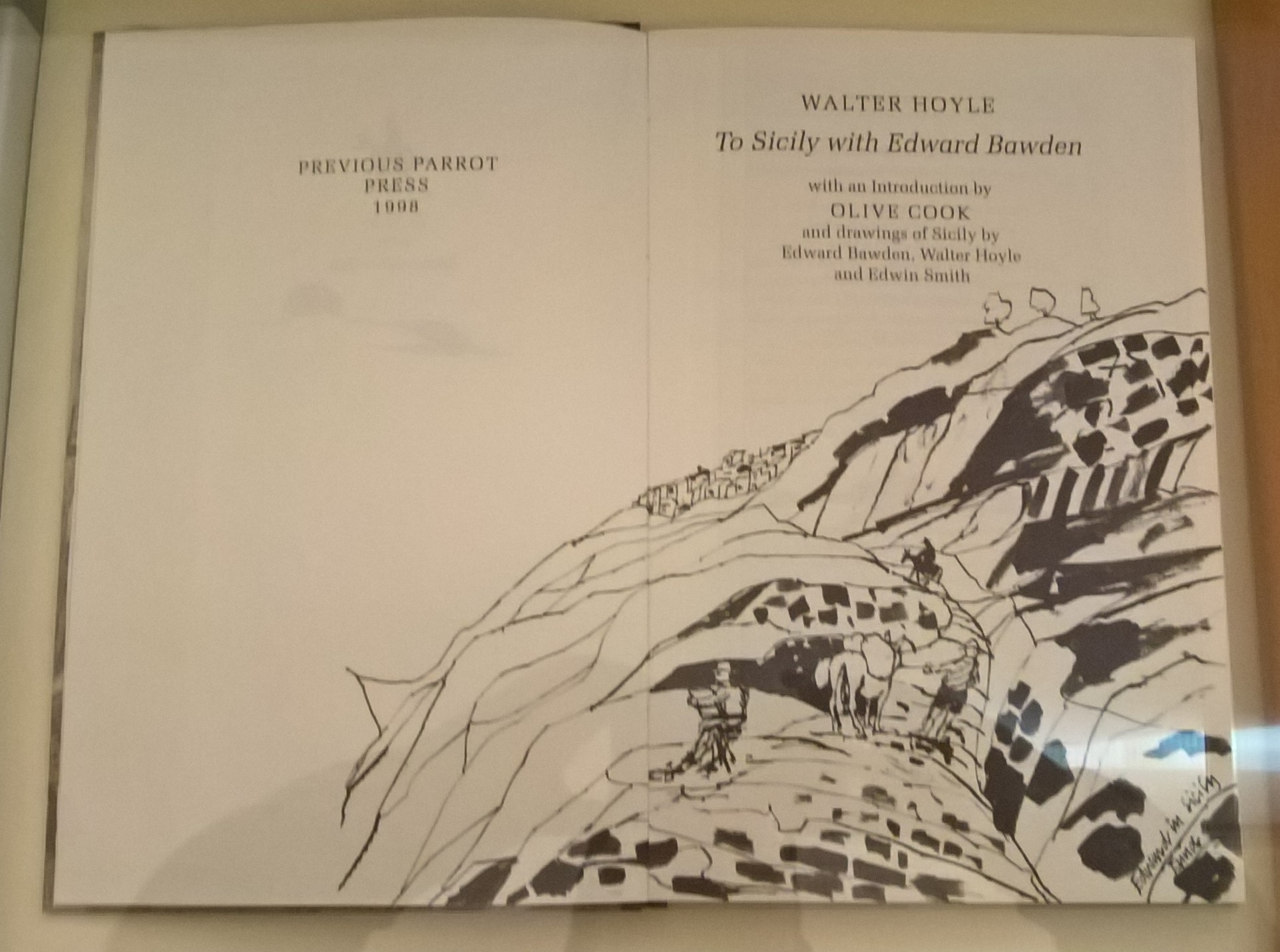
Hoyle's 'To Sicily with Edward Bawden' at the Fry Art Gallery

== Edward Bawden, Great Bardfield and family life ==
In 1950, Bawden asked Hoyle, along with Sheila Robinson, to help with the completion of his Country Life mural for the Lion and Unicorn pavilion at the Festival of Britain. The next year Bawden invited Hoyle to accompany him on a painting holiday to Sicily. Hoyle's resulting paintings were exhibited at the Leicester Galleries, London, in 1952 alongside work by Terry Frost. After his retirement, Hoyle wrote a memoir of this trip, To Sicily with Edward Bawden, which was published as an illustrated limited edition in 1998. A copy of both this limited edition and Hoyle's manuscript are held by the Fry Art Gallery, Saffron Walden; a copy of the manuscript is held by the Tate Gallery.

In 1952, Hoyle moved to Great Bardfield, Essex, where Bawden was one amongst a number of artist residents. Hoyle took part in the Great Bardfield Open House exhibitions in 1954, 1955 and 1958 (designing the catalogue cover for the 1958 exhibition. At the first of these he met his French-born wife, Denise. Their children, James and Nina were born in 1956 and 1960 respectively. In 1957, the family moved to the neighbouring village of Great Saling.

== Cambridge, Hastings and Dieppe ==
Hoyle taught at St. Martins School of Art, London, from 1951 to 1960 and the Central School of Art, London, from 1960 to 1964, when he left to take up a more local post at Cambridge School of Art. Here he established a printmaking studio and launched Cambridge Print Editions whilst continuing to exhibit in London and elsewhere. In 1972, Kettle's Yard, Cambridge, held a retrospective of his work from 1966 to 1971.

In 1975, Hoyle moved from the Great Bardfield area to Bottisham, Cambridgeshire. He retired from teaching in 1984 and that year moved to Hastings, Sussex, making frequent trips to Dieppe, France, where he owned a flat.

Hoyle died of a heart attack in 2000.

== Work ==
Editions of Hoyle's prints were produced by, amongst others, Christie's Contemporary Art, Neve International and Editions Alecto (who published his Cambridge Series of linocuts in 1965/66). His later prints combined figuration and an architectural sense of design with experimentation in printmaking processes including linocut, etching and aquatint.

In addition to paintings and prints sold through galleries (including the Leicester Galleries, London), Hoyle produced commissioned illustrative work for organisations such as Shell-Mex, the Folio Society and the BBC. He received a number of mural commissions, including restoring the painted dome of the Wren church St Mary Abchurch in London. He also produced a number of wallpaper designs, including one he named Bardfield, for Wall Paper Manufacturers Ltd, Sanderson's and Coles.

Hoyle's work is in a number of private and public collections including the Victoria and Albert Museum and the British Museum in London, the Bibliotheque National in Paris, as well as the UK Government Art Collection. A significant holding which includes paintings, prints and related objects is in the collection of the Fry Art Gallery, Saffron Walden.
