= Joan Glass =

English textile designer and painter (1915–2000)

- Born: Elizabeth Joan Glass; 1915; Orpington, Kent, England
- Died: 2000 (aged 84–85); Essex, England
- Other name: Joan Clifford-Smith
- Education: Graham Sutherland
- Movement: Textile design; Neo-romanticism
- Spouse: Stanley Clifford-Smith

Elizabeth Joan Glass (1915–2000), was an English textile designer and painter.

== Biography ==
=== Youth ===
Glass was born in Orpington, Kent. She was the oldest of three daughters born to John Pomeroy Glass and Edith Mary Muirhead. Her father, was a senior partner and later chairman of James Templeton & Co, then one of the leading makers of carpets in Britain. After her schooling Glass studied art at Chelsea Polytechnic in London. One of her teachers was neo-Romantic English painter, Graham Sutherland. At this time she was influenced by Sutherland as well as Pablo Picasso and Vincent van Gogh.

=== Career ===
During the war Glass joined the Women's Royal Naval Service and worked in military censorship. After her marriage, she became known as Joan Clifford-Smith but continued to sign her work under her maiden name (Joan Glass). She is best known for her textile designs and one of her carpet designs became one of the biggest selling commercial carpets available in Britain during the 1950s and 60s.

In 1952 she moved to Buck’s House in Great Bardfield, Essex. While in Great Bardfield, Glass and her husband became friendly with the village art community known as the Great Bardfield Artists. They organised a series of large open house exhibitions during the 1950s, which attracted thousands of visitors. Glass exhibited textiles and pictures at all these shows. Known for her fine sense of colour her textiles and paintings were mainly semi-abstract in design. Some of her work is included in the collection of the Fry Art Gallery in Saffron Walden, Essex.

The Bardfield art community fragmented in the early 1960s and Glass and her family (which now included four sons) briefly moved to London before relocating to (15th century) Little Baddow Hall, near Chelmsford, Essex. During this time the artist’s output was restricted to making and decorating ceramics, Following the example of the earlier Bardfield summer exhibitions, Glass established in 1971 a series of large summer art festivals at her Essex home. These were very popular with the local art community and in 1974 she converted her house and established the Little Baddow Hall Arts Centre.

Musicians and artists attracted to the centre included Howard Shelly, the Medici Quartet, John Miller and Andy Warhol, as well as prominent local artists Geoffrey Burnand, John Doubleday and Humphrey Spender. According to her obituary, the Arts Centre’s ‘enormous popularity was due in no part to Joan’s own stamp of style and sophistication, combined with a welcoming lack of pretension.' Despite its popularity with the mid Essex art community, the arts centre closed in 1979 and in 1990 she moved to a smaller house in Little Baddow.

== Personal life ==
During the Second World War, she served in the navy where she met artist Stanley Clifford-Smith and they married shortly after the end of the war. The couple moved to Suffolk in East Anglia where they both painted and designed fabrics. After the death of her husband she abandoned art practice for the role of art patron.

== Death ==
Joan Glass died in an Essex nursing home in 2000.
