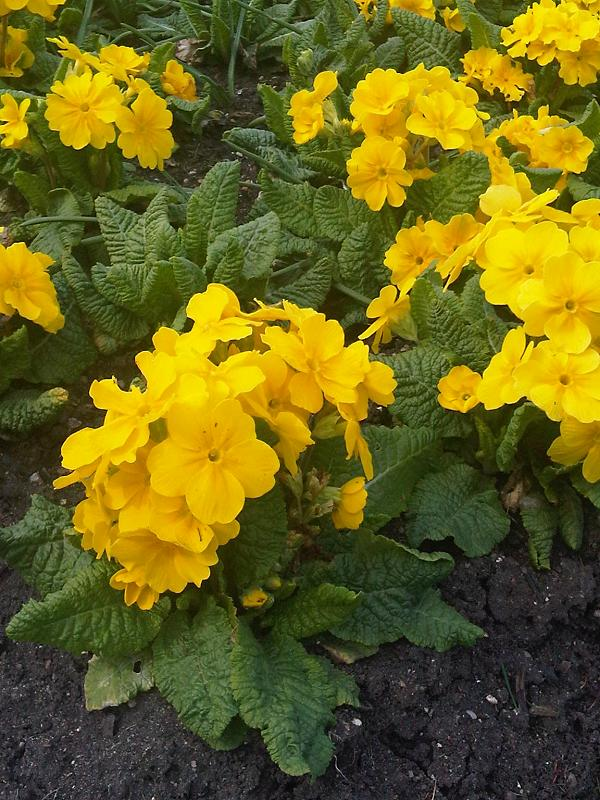
- At Kew Gardens
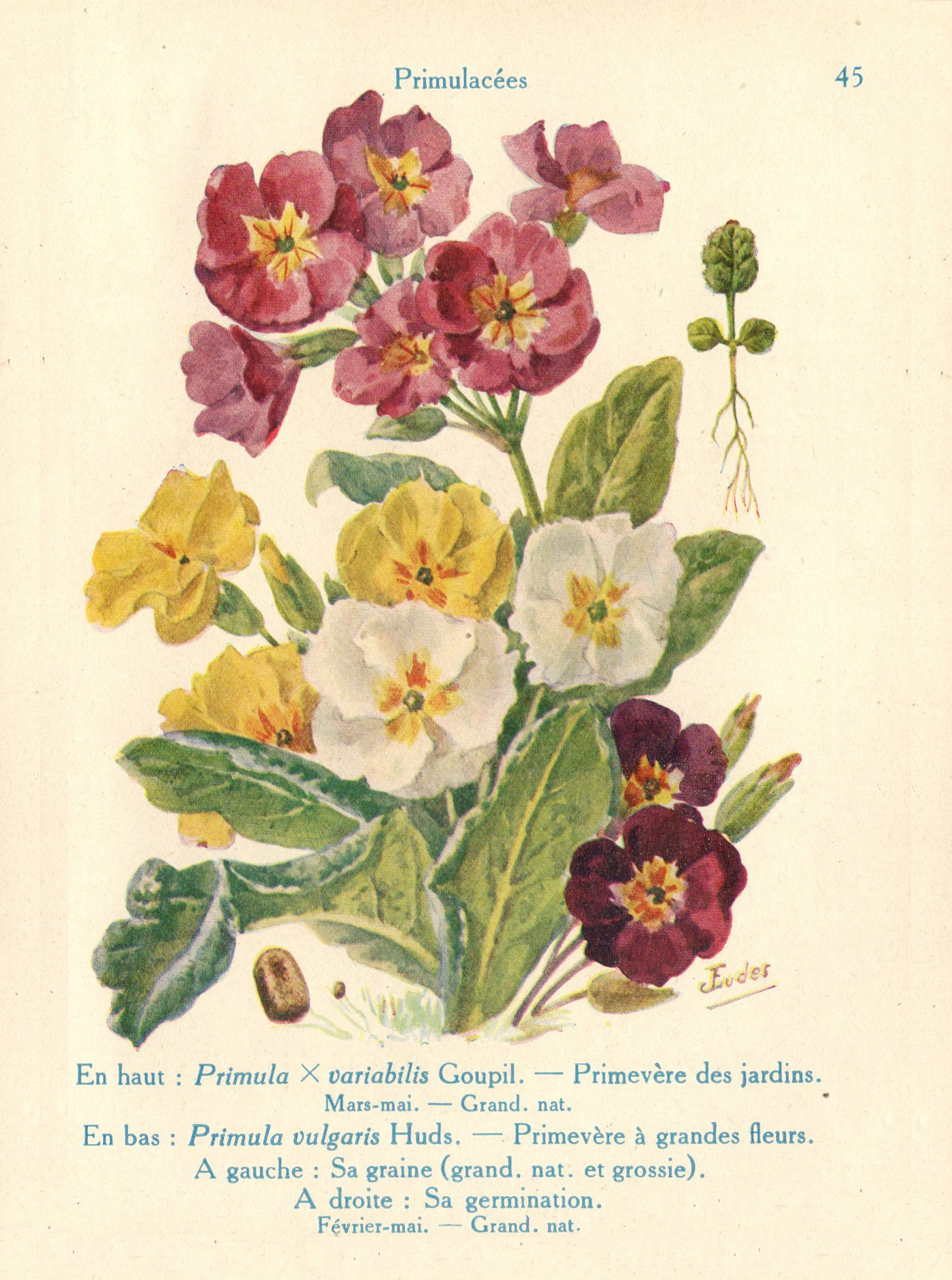
- Botanical illustration

Scientific classification
- Kingdom: Plantae
- Clade: Tracheophytes
- Clade: Angiosperms
- Clade: Eudicots
- Clade: Asterids
- Order: Ericales
- Family: Primulaceae
- Genus: Primula
- Species: P. × polyantha

Binomial name
- Primula × polyantha Mill.

Synonyms
- List: Primula × bosniaca Beck ex Fiala; Primula × brevistyla DC.; Primula × caulescens Pax; Primula × cupularis Pax; Primula × flagellicaulis A.Kern.; Primula × intermedia Facchini; Primula × legueana E.G.Camus; Primula × sanctae-coronae Beck; Primula × variabilis Goupil; Primula × variiflora Beck

= Primula × polyantha =

Species of flowering plant

Primula × polyantha, the polyanthus primrose or false oxlip, is a naturally occurring hybrid species of flowering plant in the family Primulaceae. It is the result of crosses between Primula veris (common cowslip) and Primula vulgaris (common primrose). It is native to Europe, found where the parent species' ranges overlap, and many artificial hybrid cultivars have also been created for the garden trade. Naturally‑occurring individuals (the false oxlips) tend to have yellow flowers, while a wide range of flower colors has been developed in the cultivars (the polyanthus primroses) over the centuries.

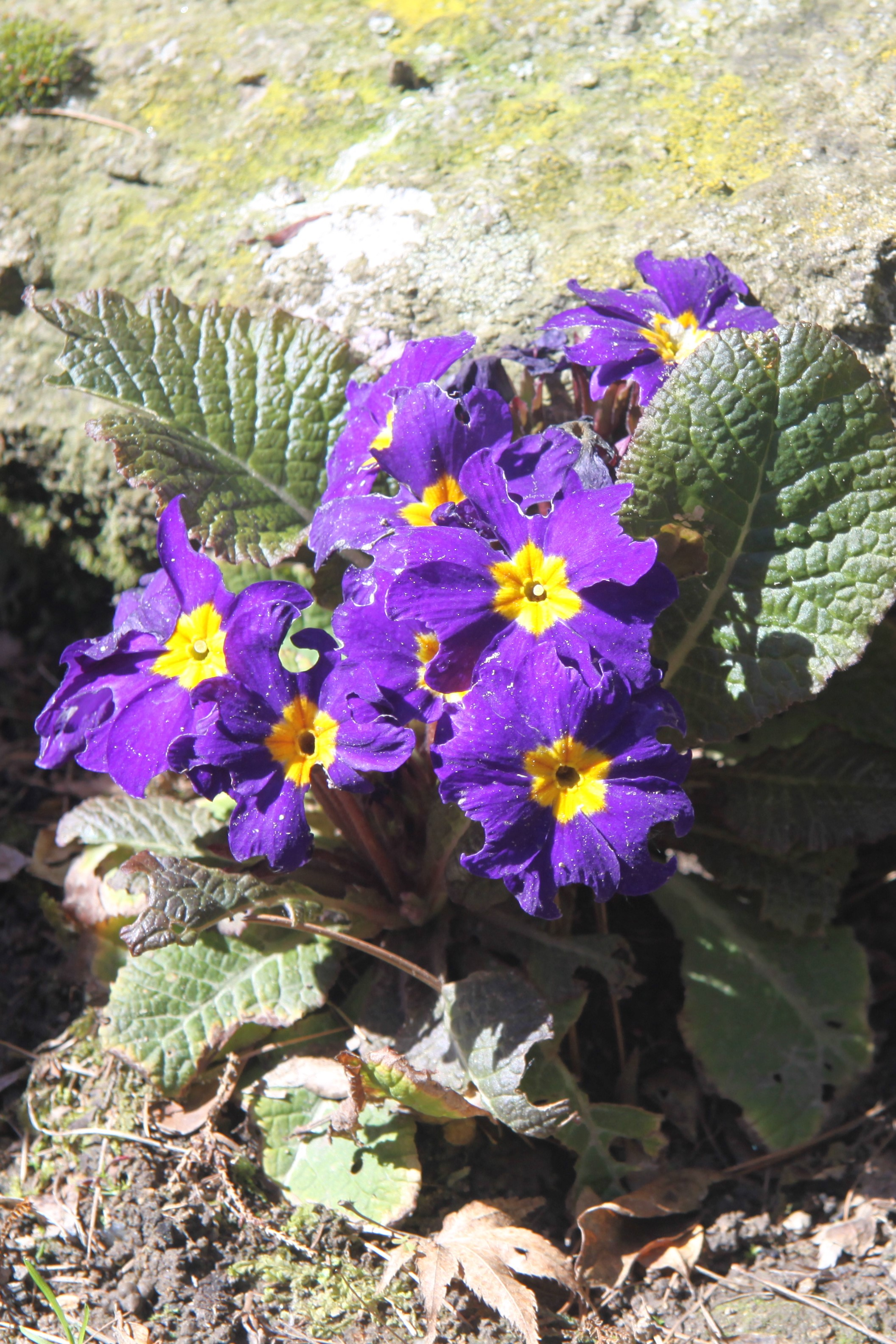
A purple and yellow cultivar

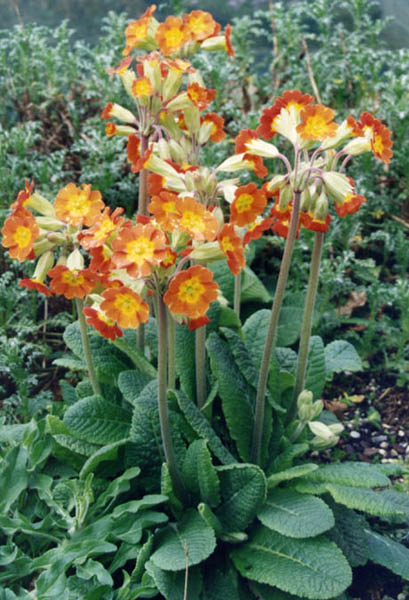
Multi-colored specimen

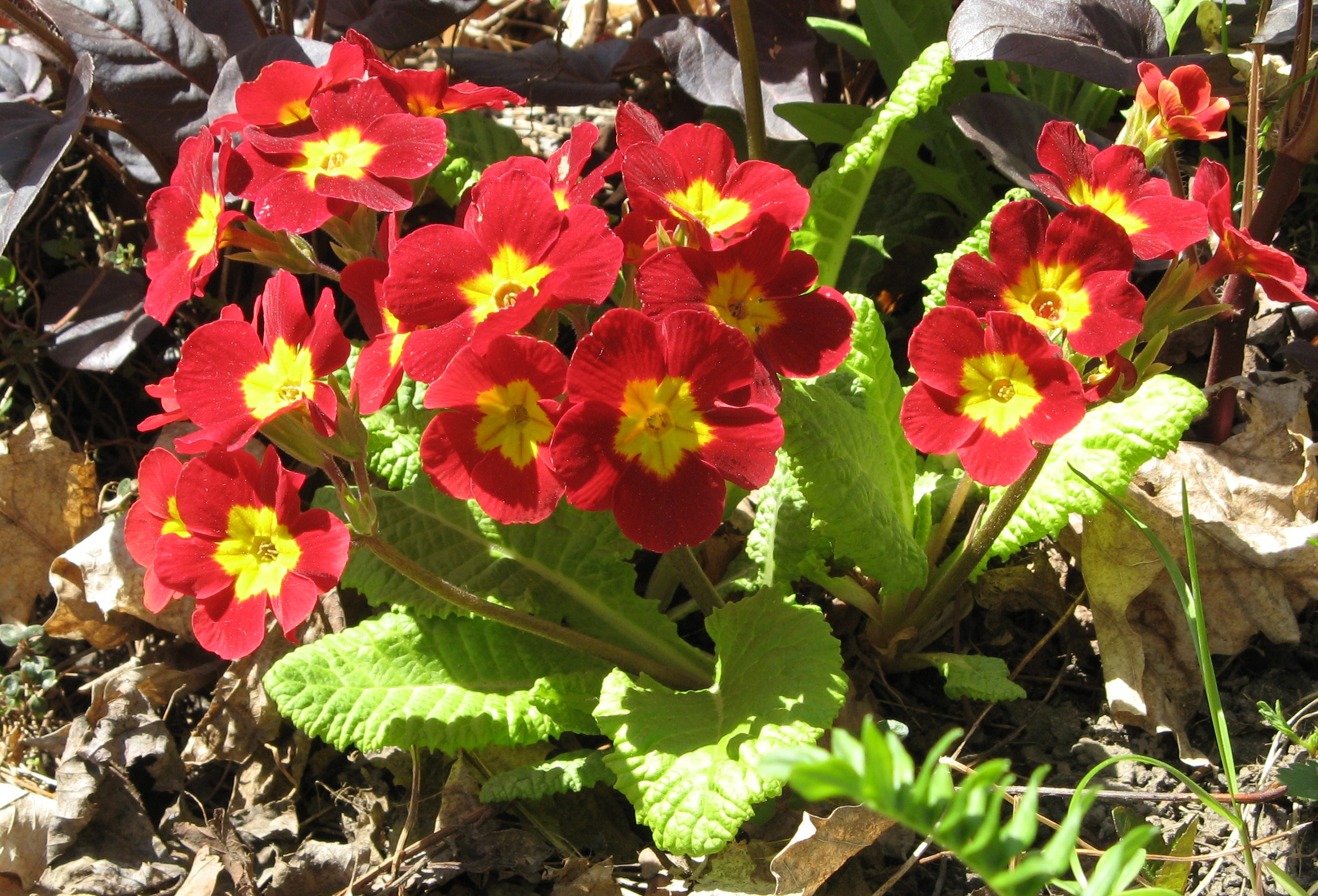
A red and yellow cultivar

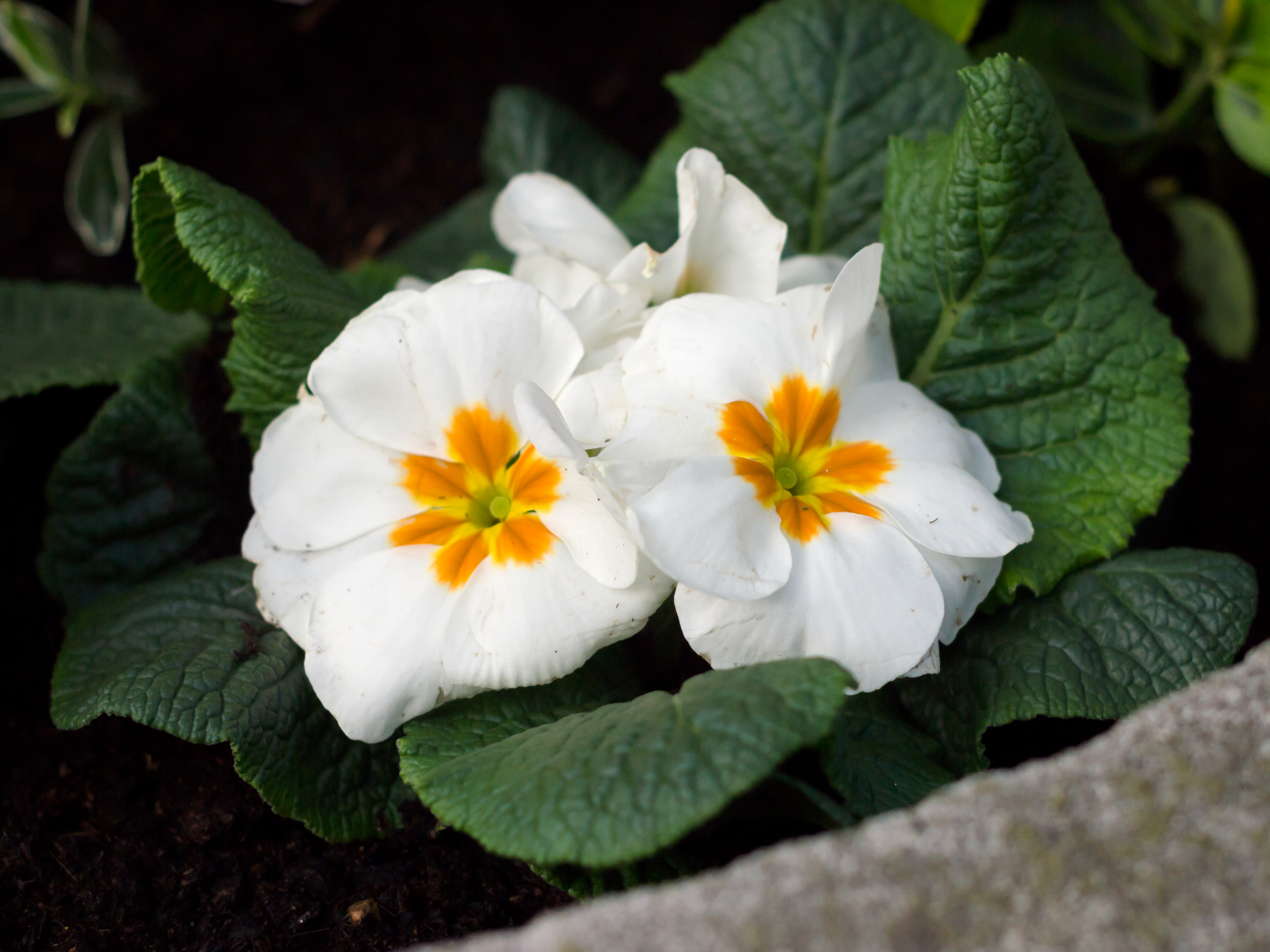
At Gray's Inn
