= Marianne Straub =

British textile designer (1909–1994)

Marianne Straub OBE RDI
- Marianne Straub
- Born: 23 September 1909; Amriswil, Switzerland
- Died: 8 November 1994 (aged 85); Berlingen, Switzerland.
- Occupations: Textile designer, academic
- Notable credit(s): Royal Designer for Industry (1972); Misha Black Medal (1993), OBE

Marianne Straub (23 September 1909 – 8 November 1994) was one of the leading commercial designers of textiles in Britain in the period from the 1940s to 1960s. She said her overriding aim was: "to design things which people could afford" in order to remain a hand weaver which did not seem satisfactory in this age of mass-production".

Linda Parry, curator of modern textiles at the Victoria and Albert Museum, described her in 1990 as "One of two or three British artists who used their great ability to serve the industry."

While she became a leading name in industrial design, creating upholstery for everything from London Underground to BEA aircraft – she almost always developed her ideas on a handloom before applying her technical expertise. She believed that if more designers tried out their ideas first, there would be fewer bad results.

== Early life and studies ==
Marianne Straub was born in the village of Amriswil, Switzerland, the second of four daughters of the textile merchant Carl Straub and his wife Cécile Kappeler. She had tuberculosis as a young child and spent over four years in a hospital ward, returning home at the age of eight. Straub studied art at the Kunstgewerbeschule in Zurich, focusing on hand weaving and textiles in the final two years where her tutor was Heinz Otto Hürlimann, who had studied at Bauhaus. She then spent six months working as a technician/helper at a mill in her village.

She moved to Bradford, England, arriving in 1932 and undertaking a year's study at Bradford Technical College. Where she was the third female student. In an interview in 1990, Straub noted that Germany during the early 1930s was out of the question as she was known for being outspoken and her mother did not want to have to rescue her from prison. The Bradford course covered textile maths, weaving technology and raw materials, as well as cloth construction, and its focus was on woollen materials as the city was a major wool manufacturing centre. The experience gave Straub a keen interest in the uses and varieties of fibres and she developed her skills in double cloth textile construction and the use of power looms.

== Move into industry ==
After finishing her course she was invited to work at Ethel Mairet's Gospels studio at Ditchling where she developed her hand loom techniques. In return, she introduced a variety of double cloth weaves to the studio and developed a firm friendship with Mairet.

Straub then began working as a consultant designer for the Welsh milling industry, advising 72 mills that were supported by the Rural Industries Bureau between 1934–7 and learning the skills of mass production. In 1937 she joined the firm of Helios, a subsidiary of Barlow & Jones as head designer, becoming managing director in 1947.

In 1950, Straub joined the firm of Warner & Sons in Braintree, Essex, and remained associated with the firm until 1970.

One of her most famous early designs for Warner was Surrey, a textile that featured in the Festival of Britain in 1951 and was used in the Regatta Restaurant. Based on the crystalline structure of afwillite, it was chosen as representative of textiles of the early post-war period.

== Great Bardfield Artists ==
In 1953, Straub moved to the north-west Essex village of Great Bardfield, and remains associated with the artists' community that developed there. Her neighbours included John Aldridge RA, Edward Bawden and Audrey Cruddas and Straub became friends with most of them and an integral part of the community. The village's "open house" exhibitions attracted national press attention and thousands visited the remote village to view art in the artists' own homes during the summer exhibitions of 1954, 1955 and 1958.

== Work from the 1960s ==
While Straub continued to work with Warner until 1970, she was also enlisted by Isabel Tisdall to create designs for the newly launched venture Tamesa Fabrics from 1964 – all designs were manufactured by Warner. Aimed firmly at the contract and commercial market, Tamesa was highly successful in introducing alternatives to the prevailing fashion for bold pattern, instead focusing on texture, tone and high-specification fabrics. Designs from the Tamesa range were to feature on everything from the QE2 to BEA's Trident aircraft – Straub was responsible for many of them, including the Trident seatcovers.

=== London Transport commission ===
Straub was also among the designers used to create the livery for moquette upholstery on London Transport buses and trains. Her blue/green design (known as Straub) was used on all buses and trains entering service from 1969 to 1978, notably featuring on trains operating along the Piccadilly line extension to Heathrow Airport opened in 1977. The design – and variations of it – also featured in British Rail carriages of the period.

== Academic work ==
Straub's work was already well respected by 1952, when she spoke at the international craft conference held at Dartington Hall and argued for the preservation of knowledge among the crafts community.

She became an influential textile teacher, combining work with Warner with teaching at Central School of Art, London from 1956. She also taught at Hornsey College of Art and the Royal College of Art. She was on the advisory council for the School of Art at Goldsmiths' College.

On retirement in 1970, she left Great Bardfield and moved to Cambridge. She continued to maintain her interest in cloth and weaving in retirement. In a letter to curator, academic and author Mary Schoeser some three months before her death, Straub described her design process. "Whilst thinking of the new cloth, I think of its weight, its draping qualities, the handle; I see it in colours...The essence of the whole exercise is to place the cloth, in my imagination, into the situation in which it will be used."

=== Awards ===
Straub was made a Royal Designer for Industry in 1972. In 1993, she received the Sir Misha Black Medal. She was a member of the Red Rose Guild and also a Fellow of the Society of Industrial Artists and Designers (SIAD) and was appointed an OBE for services to textile weaving.

== Publications ==
- Straub, Marianne (1977). Hand Weaving and Cloth Design. Pelham. ISBN 978-0720709681. OCLC 632904298.
