= Fry Art Gallery =

Public non-profit museum in Essex, England

Coordinates: 52.0251°N 0.2378°E

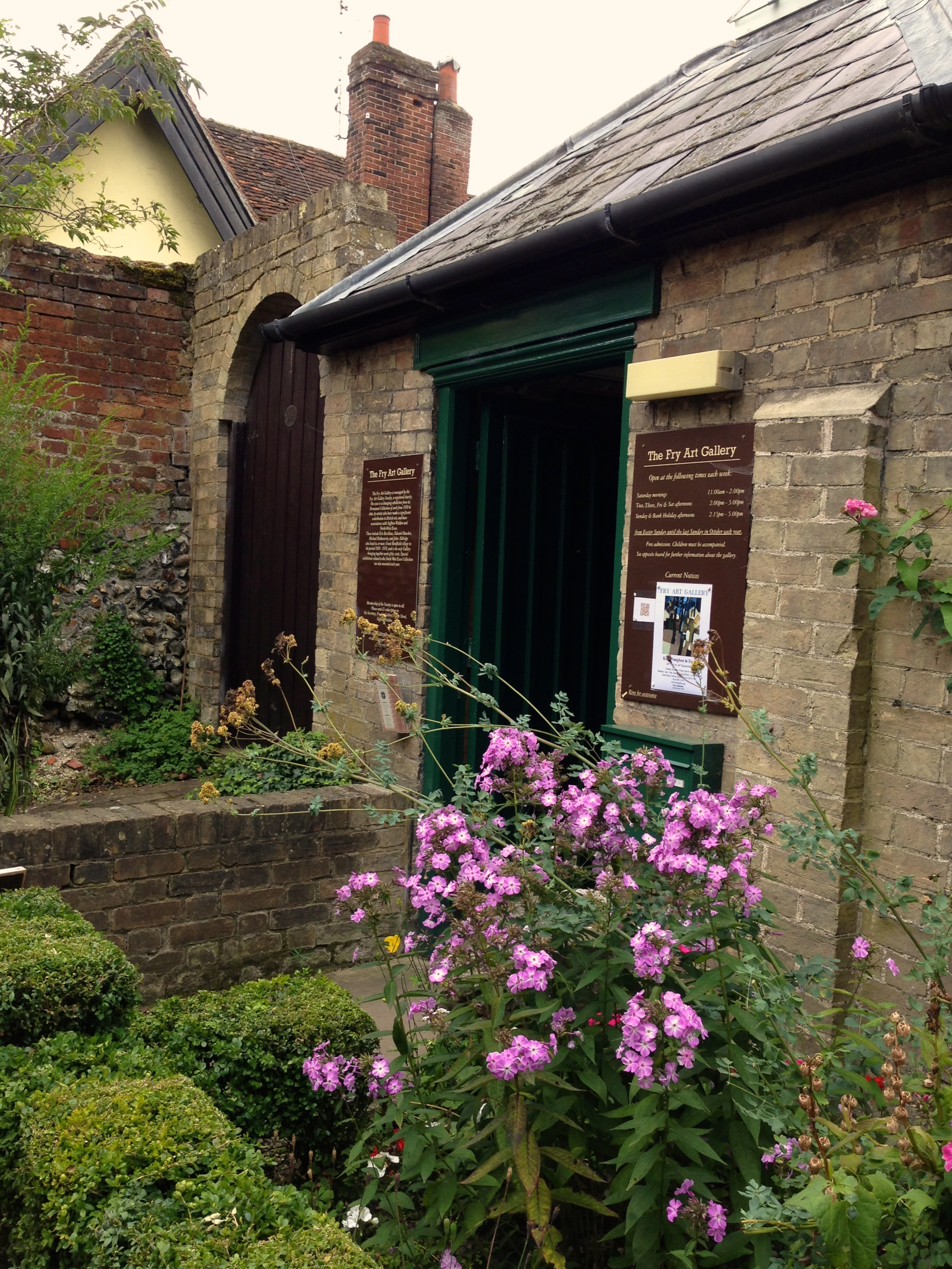
Entrance to the Fry Art Gallery

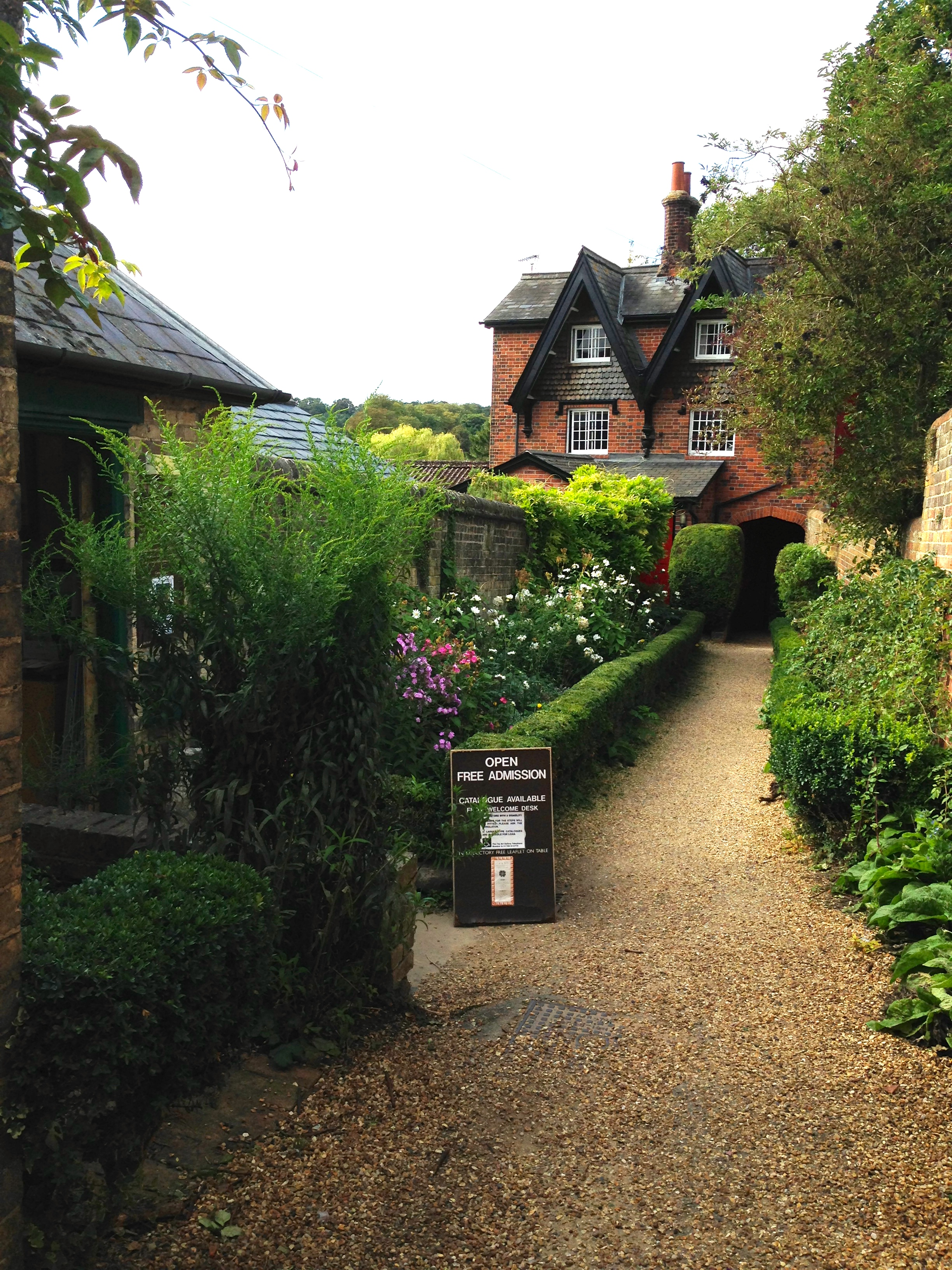
The gallery adjoins the historic Bridge End Gardens, which were also created by the Gibson family in the 19th century

The Fry Art Gallery is an art gallery in Saffron Walden, Essex. Recognised as an Accredited Museum by Arts Council England, it displays work by artists of national significance who lived or worked in North West Essex during the twentieth century and after. The gallery is known for its comprehensive collection of work by the Great Bardfield Artists, including Edward Bawden and Eric Ravilious.

== The collection and exhibitions ==
The Fry Art Gallery is home to the North West Essex Collection, a set of more than 3,000 works by diverse, nationally important artists who have lived or worked in the area. The collection includes paintings, prints, books, artists' scrapbooks, ceramics, wallpapers and decorative designs. There is an emphasis on artists who worked in and around Great Bardfield in the middle of the twentieth century, including Edward Bawden, Eric Ravilious, Tirzah Garwood, John Aldridge, Sheila Robinson, Bernard Cheese, Chloe Cheese, Walter Hoyle, Michael Rothenstein, Kenneth Rowntree, George Chapman and Marianne Straub. Artists in the collection with a connection to the wider area include Michael Ayrton, John Bellany, Robert Colquhoun, Robert MacBryde, Grayson Perry and Keith Vaughan.

The gallery displays a revolving selection of works from the collection in themed exhibitions. In 2016/17 the exhibitions held were: Exploring – Inspirational Places for North West Essex Artists, and three sequential temporary exhibitions: George Chapman – From Bardfield to the Rhondda; Michael Rothenstein – Sustained Invention; and Connections.

Items from the collection have been lent to exhibitions elsewhere, including Eric Ravilious at the Dulwich Picture Gallery in 2015 and Ravilious and Co at the Towner Gallery in 2017. New acquisitions to the collection have been supported by the Art Fund and the V&A Purchase Fund.

=== Work of the Great Bardfield Artists ===
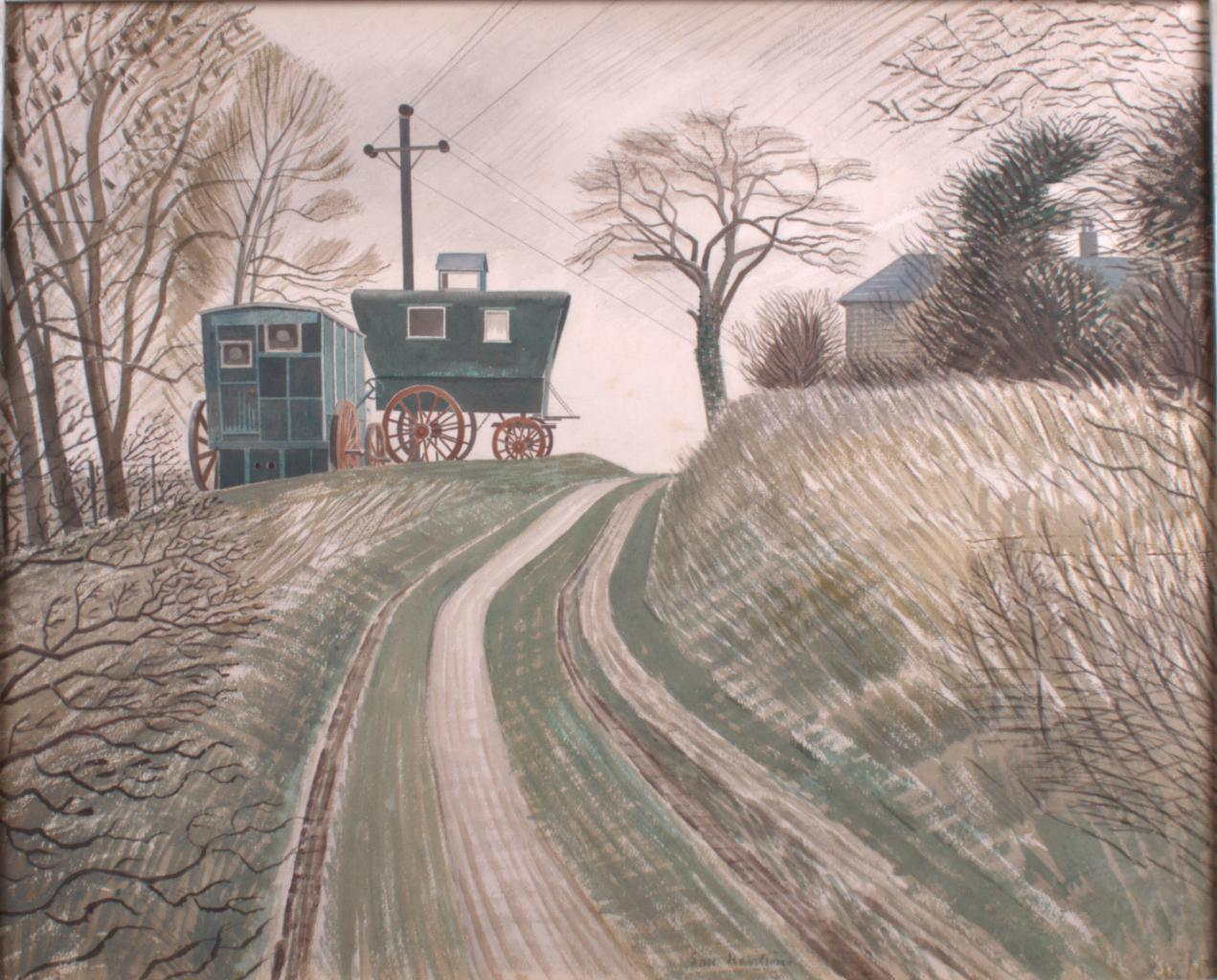
"Caravans" (Eric Ravilious)

Edward Bawden, who with his friend Eric Ravilious discovered Great Bardfield and became a key figure in the local artists' scene, is well represented in the Fry Art Gallery collection through linocuts, watercolours, posters, ceramics, books, scrapbooks and other printed material. The gallery holds watercolours by Ravilious, plus lithographs, books, fabric, ceramics and a collection of woodblocks, as well as two of his scrapbooks.

In 2015 V&A Publishing, in association with the Fry Art Gallery, published Bawden, Ravilious and the Artists of Great Bardfield, illustrating a number of the pieces by Bawden, Ravilious, Rothenstein and other Bardfield artists in the collection.

== History and operation ==
The Fry Art Gallery building was designed to house the art collection of Francis Gibson, a local Quaker businessman who died in 1859. The collection was inherited by his daughter, Elizabeth, who had married the Bristol MP Lewis Fry. The gallery passed through the Fry family, who maintained a tradition of public access and who displayed a mixture of the family collection of historic masters and paintings by family members, including Roger Fry, until its closure in the early 1970s.

The Fry Art Gallery Society was formed as a charity in 1985 and the gallery re-opened in its present form 1987. Prior to its closure it had been named the "Gibson Gallery". In 2002 the North West Essex Collection Trust, a separate charity, was formed, to be responsible for the safekeeping of the collection. In 2015 the Society purchased the freehold for the gallery building.

Total visitor numbers for 2016 were approximately 11,000.

== Sources ==
- Artists at the Fry (Saffron Walden, Essex: The Fry Art Gallery, 2012)
- Ravilious at the Fry (Saffron Walden, Essex: The Fry Art Gallery, 2012)
- Rothenstein at the Fry (Saffron Walden, Essex: The Fry Art Gallery, 2017)
- Gill Saunders and Malcolm Yorke (Eds), Bawden, Ravilious and the Artists of Great Bardfield (London: V&A Publishing, 2015)
- Andy Friend, Ravilious and Co (London: Thames and Hudson, 2017)
- Garwood, Tirzah, Long Live Great Bardfield (London: Persephone, 2016)
