= Laurence Scarfe =

British artist and designer

Laurence Scarfe (1914-1993) was a British artist and designer, active in the twentieth century.

== His work ==
Laurence Scarfe was born in Idle, Yorkshire in 1914. He attended Shipley School of Art and later moved to London. From 1933 to 1937 he studied painting at the Royal College of Art. He worked with several visual disciplines including book and magazine illustration, poster and wallpaper design, mural painting, fine art and ceramic decoration.

Scarfe is mostly known for his mural paintings. In 1937 he did mural work for the British Pavilion at the Exposition Internationale des Arts et Techniques dans la Vie Moderne, then the Books & Printing section at the Britain Can Make It Exhibition in 1946 and at the British Industries Fair in 1948. He also created mural paintings for Regatta Restaurant and the Dome of Discovery at the Festival of Britain exhibition. He was a fellow of the Society of Industrial Artist and Designers as well as a member of the Society of Mural Painters

In the 1960s he created a collection of wallpapers. A number of his wallpapers is exhibited to the public at the Museum of Domestic Design and Architecture, Middlesex University in London
