= Sheila Robinson (artist) =

English artist

Sheila Robinson (1925–1988) was a British artist and illustrator, one of the Great Bardfield Artists and a member of staff at the Royal College of Art. After her death, the RCA created the Sheila Robinson Drawing Prize in her honour.

== Biography ==
Sheila Robinson was born in Nottingham in 1925. She studied at the Nottingham School of Art and at the Royal College of Art, where she was a student of Edward Bawden. One of her RCA projects was a complete, hand-drawn, lettered and bound book, The Twelve Dancing Princesses. She married Bernard Cheese and moved to Thaxted, Essex, to raise their two children, one of whom is illustrator and printmaker Chloe Cheese. The marriage broke down, and she and the children moved to Great Bardfield in Essex, where she worked as part of a team with Edward Bawden on the Festival of Britain. She worked on a number of commercial commissions - advertising posters, including for BBC publications such as Time and Tune and the BBC Book of the Countryside. Robinson created several posters for London Transport in the early 1950s, including Literary London and Tattoo. She then taught at the Royal College of Art, and developed her work in printmaking and card-cut illustration. She was also one of the artists who contributed to The Oxford Illustrated Old Testament in the 1960s (along with Edward Ardizzone, Edward Bawden, Peter Blake, John Brathy, Edward Burra, David Hockney, Carel Weight and Brian Wildsmith. She died of a brain tumour in Saffron Walden in 1988.

== Works ==
- Illustrations for the boxed edition of D.H. Lawrence's Sons and Lovers (Limited Editions Club of New York, 1975)
- Illustrations for The Oxford Illustrated Old Testament, 1960s
- Illustrations for the Festival of Britain.

== The Sheila Robinson Drawing Prize ==
This prize was established in her honour at the Royal College of Art. Recipients include:

- 2013 - Anna Suwalowska
- 2010 - Leah Fusco
- 2010 - Rebecca Davies
- 2009 - Zoe Taylor
- 2006 - David Peter Kerr
- 2003 - Daryl Waller
- 2000 - Yu Rong
- Laura Carlin
- Yukki Yaura
