= John Aldridge (artist) =

English painter

Aldridge in June 1970.

John Arthur Malcolm Aldridge RA (26 July 1905 – 3 May 1983) was a British oil painter, draftsman, wallpaper designer, and art teacher in the United Kingdom. He was elected an Associate of the Royal Academy (ARA) in 1954 and a Royal Academician (RA) in 1963.

== Early years ==
Born in Woolwich, England, Aldridge grew up in a comparatively wealthy military family. After attending Uppingham School in Rutland, Aldridge studied 'Greats' at Corpus Christi College at Oxford University and graduated in 1928 with a Bachelor of Arts degree. After finishing university, Aldridge settled in London, taught himself to paint and held his first mixed exhibition in 1931.

== Beginning of career as artist ==
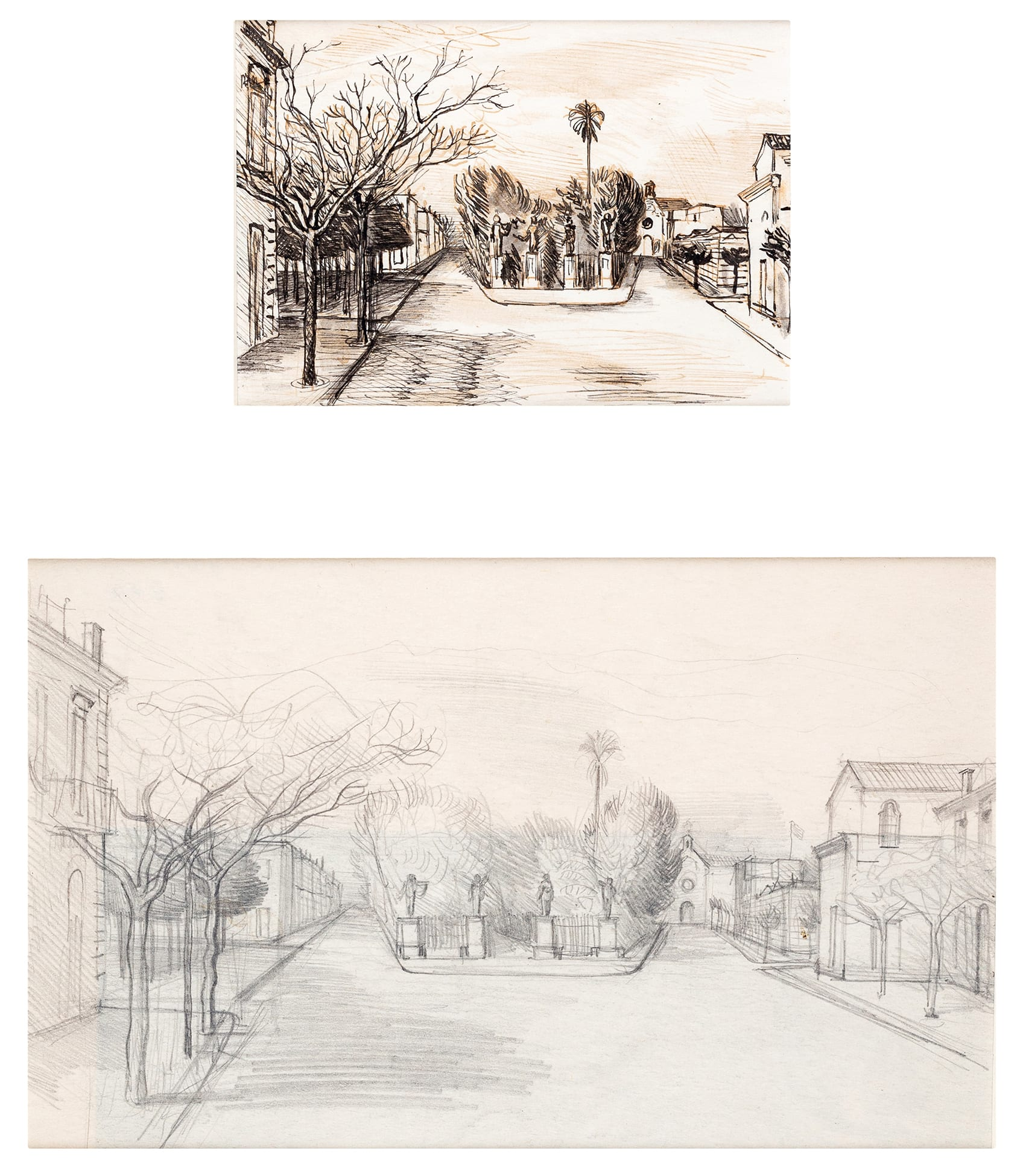
Aldridge's pen and ink drawing of San Severo and a pencil drawing of the same scene, circa 1944 or 1945. The pencil drawing is on the back of an aerial reconnaissance photograph.

Aldridge exhibited with the 'Seven and Five Society' at the Leicester Galleries from 1931 to 1933. In 1933, he presented his first one man-show at the Leicester Galleries in London and in 1934 he exhibited at the Venice Biennale art exhibition in Italy. During this period and for the rest of his life, Aldridge associated with the British poet Robert Graves and the poets and artists centred on him in the village of Deià, Mallorca. In 1933, at age 28, Aldridge, and his cats, moved to Great Bardfield in the Essex countryside and acquired 'Place House'. He quickly became a friend of his neighbour, Edward Bawden, himself a painter. The two artists collaborated in designing 'Bardfield' wallpapers during the later 1930s, which were distributed by Cole & Sons, a British wallpaper company. In 1941, Aldridge joined the British Intelligence Corps as an officer interpreting aerial photographs. After leaving the army in 1945, Aldridge returned to landscape painting. Although he was a skilled 'plein air' painter, many works were produced in his studio at his home; his subjects were the Essex countryside, scenes from his many visits to Italy and to Mallorca, and his much-loved garden at Place House.

== Great Bardfield ==
Starting in 1949, Aldridge taught at the Slade School for Fine Arts of University College London, under the realist painter Sir William Coldstream. After that, he became very popular. At the same time, other artists started moving to Great Bardfield, making the village a dynamic centre for the visual arts. Aldridge and his wife Cecelia Lucie Leeds Aldridge (née Saunders, a divorcee) frequently opened Place House for summer exhibitions in the village. These well-organised shows attracted thousands of art lovers. In 1955, Aldridge told a London Observer reporter that "people seem to prefer this domestic informality to galleries". At these summer exhibitions, Aldridge exhibited his oils while Lucie exhibited her hand-knitted rugs. Although Aldridge's work was well received, it seemed the most conservative of the Great Bardfield Artists, as it possibly reflected the art scene of the 1920s and 1930s in Britain.

The early 1960s saw the Bardfield art community fragment, but Aldridge would remain in Place House until his death. After his 1970 divorce, Aldridge married Gretl Cameron, the widow of his poet friend Norman Cameron. In 1980, on Aldridge's 75th birthday, London's New Grafton Gallery held a retrospective on his work. He died in 1983, his wife Gretl having pre-deceased him a few months earlier.

== Legacy ==
Aldridge's artwork is with the British Council and in the London collections of the Tate Gallery, the National Portrait Gallery, the Victoria and Albert Museum, and the Royal Academy.

A major holding of Aldridge's work is in the North West Essex Collection of the Fry Art Gallery in Saffron Walden, Essex. In 1999, the Fry Art Gallery presented a show of his oils and in 2000 an exhibition of his drawings and prints. An exhibition of his landscape oils and other works from across his career was held at the Fry from 7 September to 27 October 2013.

Some of his works were included in the Fry gallery's exhibition of Great Bardfield artists, held from 2 April to 29 October 2023.

== Sources ==
- John Aldridge, ‘John Aldridge’, Great Bardfield Artists, W. S. Cowell Ltd, c.1957
- Martin Salisbury (Ed), Artists of the Fry: Art and Design in the North West Essex Collection, Ruskin Press, Cambridge, 2003.
- Ian Tregarthen Jenkin, ‘John Aldridge RA’, Fry Art Gallery, Saffron Walden, 1999
- Nevile Wallis, 'Art in a Village’, Observer, 17 July 1955
- Peter Donovan, 'John Aldridge RA', Catalogue of exhibition 7 September to 27 October 2013 at the Fry Art Gallery, Saffron Walden, Essex
- Andrew Lambirth, 'Fresh airing for artist who loved the outdoors', Sunday Telegraph 28 September 2013
