= Edward Bawden =

English painter (1903–1989)

- Bawden in 1946
- Born: 10 March 1903; Braintree, Essex, England
- Died: 21 November 1989 (aged 86); Saffron Walden, Essex, England
- Education: Cambridge Municipal Art School, Royal College of Art (scholarship)
- Known for: Painter, illustrator, graphic artist
- Notable work: Roman Catholic Church at Addis Ababa (1941), Nine London Monuments (1966), Six London Markets (1967)
- Movement: Great Bardfield Artists
- Spouse: Charlotte Bawden
- Awards: RA, CBE, RDI

Edward Bawden, CBE RA (10 March 1903 – 21 November 1989) was an English painter, illustrator and graphic artist, known for his prints, book covers, posters, and garden metalwork furniture. Bawden taught at the Royal College of Art, where he had been a student, worked as a commercial artist and served as a war artist in World War II. He was a fine watercolour painter but worked in many different media. He illustrated several books and painted murals in both the 1930s and 1960s. He was admired by Edward Gorey, David Gentleman and other graphic artists, and his work and career is often associated with that of his contemporary Eric Ravilious.

Edward Bawden was married to the potter and artist, Charlotte Bawden (née Epton). Together they were principal members of the Great Bardfield Artists, a community of artists influential in the art scene of England during the mid-20th century.

== Early life and studies ==
Edward Bawden was born on 10 March 1903 at Braintree, Essex, the only child of Edward Bawden, an ironmonger, and Eleanor Bawden (née Game). His parents were Methodist Christians. A solitary child, he spent much time drawing or wandering with butterfly-net and microscope. At the age of seven he was enrolled at Braintree High School, and began studying or copying drawings of cats by Louis Wain, illustrations in boys' and girls' magazines, and Burne Jones' illustrations of Malory's Morte d'Arthur. Later his parents paid for him to attend the Friends' School at Saffron Walden, and there, when he was fifteen, the headmaster recommended him to study for one day a week at Cambridge School of Art.

Upon leaving school in 1919, he attended Cambridge School of Art full-time from 1919 to 1921. There he became interested in calligraphy and in the work of Aubrey Beardsley, Richard Doyle, William Morris and other Victorians. This was followed in 1922 by a scholarship to the Royal College of Art School of Design in London, where he took a diploma in illustration until 1925. Here he met his fellow student and future collaborator Eric Ravilious; the pair were described by their teacher Paul Nash as "an extraordinary outbreak of talent".

== Early work ==
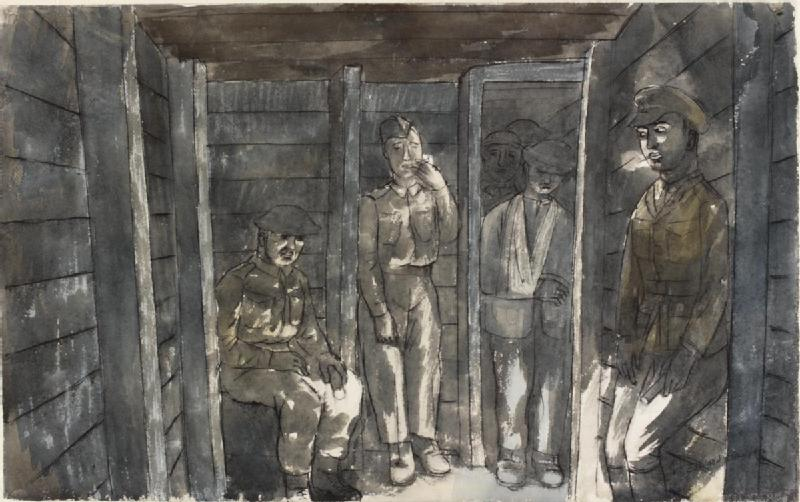
In an Air Raid Shelter, Dunkirk—Bombs are dropping. (IWM ART LD239)

It was during this period that Bawden produced the tiles for the London Underground that were exhibited at the International Building Trades Exhibition at Olympia in April 1928.

In 1928, Bawden was commissioned by Sir Joseph Duveen, at the rate of £1 per day, to create a mural for the Refectory at Morley College, London along with Ravilious and Charles Mahoney. The mural was unveiled in 1930 by former Prime Minister Stanley Baldwin, who was at the time Leader of the Opposition.

By 1930, Bawden was working one day a week for the Curwen Press, as was Ravilious and their former tutor, Nash, producing illustrations for leading companies at the time such as London Transport, Westminster Bank, Twinings, Poole Potteries, Shell-Mex & BP, the Folio Society, Chatto & Windus and Penguin Books. In the early 1930s he was discovered by the Stuart Advertising Agency, owned by H. Stuart Menzies and Marcus Brumwell. Around this time Bawden produced some of his most humorous and innovative work for Fortnum & Mason and Imperial Airways. He also worked for The Listener.

In 1932, Bawden married Charlotte Epton, a successful potter, who had been a fellow-student at the Royal College. They had two children, Joanna and Richard, both of whom would become artists. At first the couple lived in a flat in Hammersmith, but soon moved to a Georgian house in Great Bardfield, Essex, only a few miles from Braintree, where Bawden had been born. Following his move to the country he began to paint more, in addition to his commercial design work, developing his watercolour technique. Most of his subjects were of scenes around Great Bardfield. He held an exhibition of his Essex watercolours at the Zwemmer Gallery in 1934, and another show of his paintings was held at the Leicester Galleries in 1938. According to the Fry Gallery, "Charlotte Bawden was at the centre of all the artistic and social activity in Great Bardfield through four decades, providing generous hospitality, organisation, and support for Edward in his extensive output and teaching."

In 1938, Bawden collaborated with John Aldridge, who also lived in the village, on a range of wallpapers that they intended to be printed commercially, but from lino blocks handcut by the designers. The project left little other time for other work during the year, and war intervened before the papers could go into production.

One of Bawden's most familiar designs from this era was the 'Puzzled Lion and Startled Unicorn' Observer masthead, which was created around 1939 and remained in use by the national newspaper until 1989.

== War artist ==
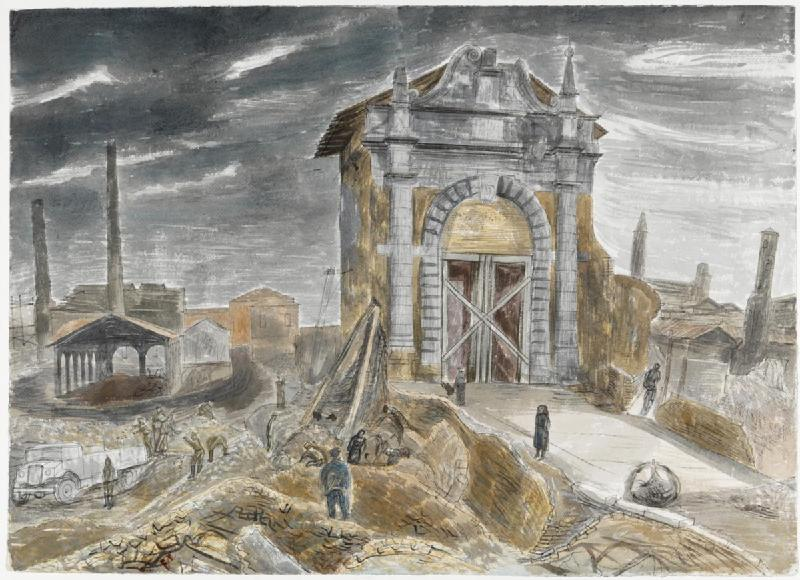
Ravenna – Royal Engineers' working party collecting material for bridge repairs and road making at the Porta Cybo (IWM ART LD4967)

During World War II Bawden served as an official war artist, first with the British army in France and then, following the army's evacuation from there, in the Middle East. Already in France before World War II was declared, he recorded defences being prepared at Halluin, then witnessed the bombing of Armentières and the evacuation from Dunkirk. He was posted to North Africa as a War Office Artist on a full-time War Artists' Advisory Committee contract. Bawden painted landscapes and portraits in Libya, Sudan, Cairo, Eritrea and Ethiopia, reaching Addis Ababa in May 1941. At the start of 1942 he travelled with Anthony Gross to Palestine and Lebanon.

After making a series of studies of the Marsh Arabs in southern Iraq, Bawden was recalled to London. He departed Cairo aboard the SS Stratheden but transferred to the RMS Laconia in Durban on 27 August 1942. After the Laconia was torpedoed and sunk, on 12 September 1942, he spent five days in an open lifeboat before being rescued by a French ship, the Gloire. He was held prisoner in a Vichy internment camp in Casablanca for two months before the camp was liberated by American troops. From Casablanca he sailed to Norfolk, Virginia. When he eventually returned to Britain, Bawden did portrait work at the Military Hospital in Colchester and in Scotland, with Polish forces training there. He returned to Iraq in September 1943, as a Ministry of Information artist to work in Baghdad and Kurdistan, before he joined the Middle East Anti-Locust Unit on its trek to Jeddah. From Jeddah, he returned to the Marsh Arabs in southern Iraq, before entering Iran to portray supply shipments to the Soviet Union.

Bawden returned to England in 1944 and for a short while, painted at Southampton Docks before departing for Yugoslavia, by way of Rome. Unable to enter Yugoslavia he went to Ravenna, then Greece, Austria and Florence before travelling back to England in July 1945.

== Later work ==
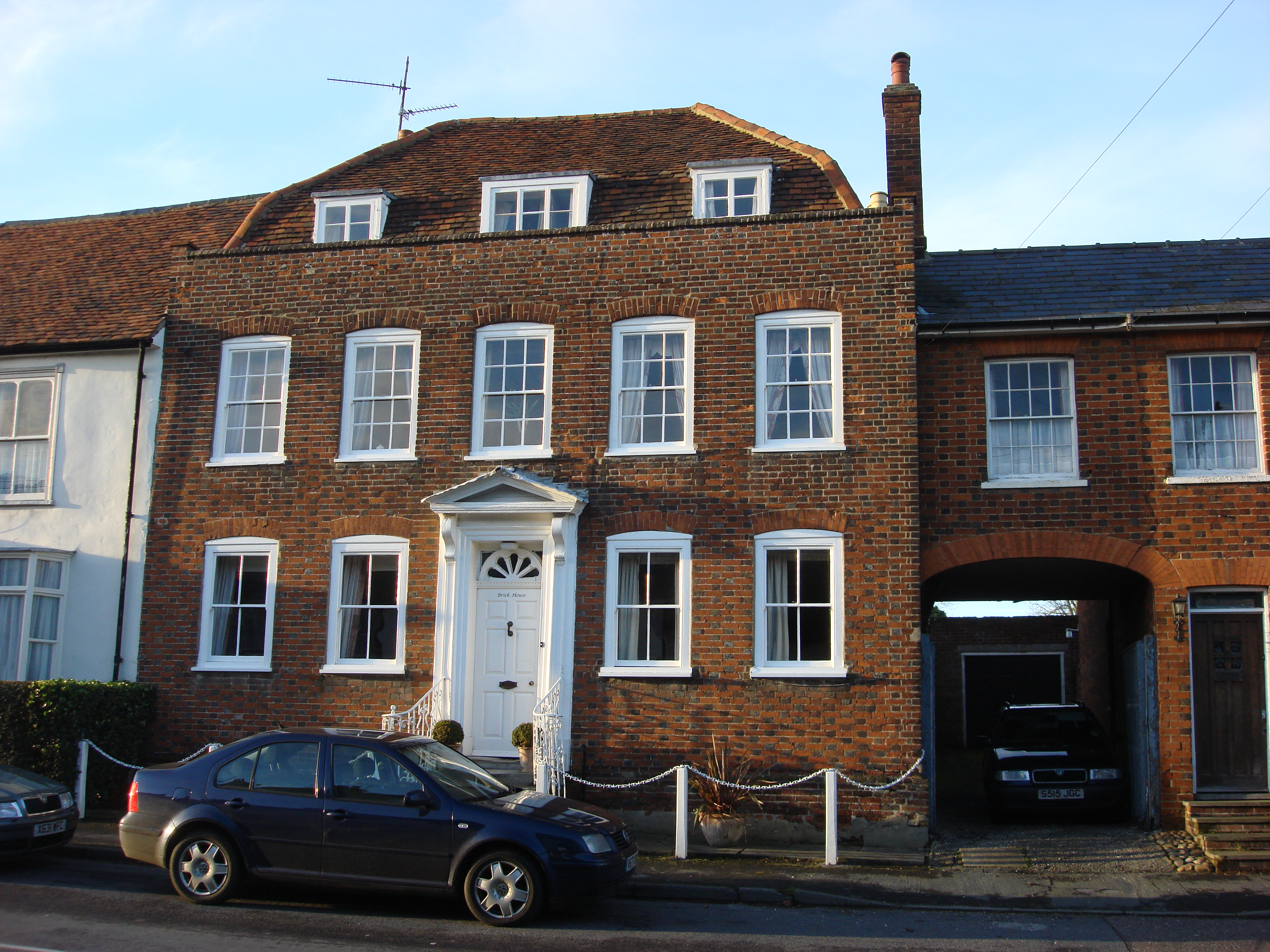
Brick House in Great Bardfield

Bawden lived in Great Bardfield, Essex from the 1930s to 1970. While living at Bardfield he was an important member of the Great Bardfield Artists. This group of local artists were diverse in style but shared a love for figurative art, making the group distinct from the better known St Ives art community in Cornwall, who, after the war, were chiefly dominated by abstractionists.

In 1949, Bawden provided illustrations for the book London is London – A Selection of Prose and Verse by D. M. Low. Bawden completed a series of eleven murals for the First Class lounge of the P&O liner Oronsay, which was launched in 1951. The theme was the English pub and Bawden depicted traditional pub names, such as the Rose & Crown, in purely visual form in his design. For the Festival of Britain in 1951 he created a mural, English Country Life, that was displayed in the entrance of The Lion and the Unicorn Pavilion.

During the 1950s, the Great Bardfield Artists organised a series of large 'open house' exhibitions which attracted national press attention. Positive reviews and the novelty of viewing art works in the artists' own homes (including Bawden's Brick House) led to thousands visiting the remote village during the summer exhibitions of 1954, 1955, and 1958. As well as these shows, the Great Bardfield Artists held several touring exhibitions of their work in 1957, 1958, and 1959.

After the death of his wife in 1970, Bawden moved to the nearby town of Saffron Walden, where he continued to work until his death at home on 21 November 1989.

== Legacy ==
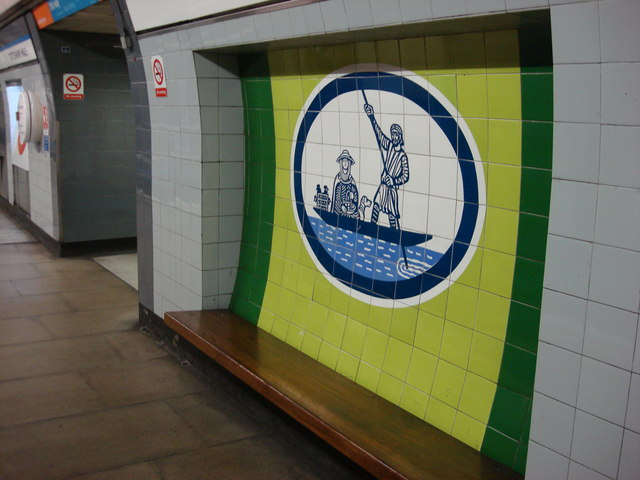
Bawden's Ferry across the River Lea tile at Tottenham Hale tube station

Bawden bequeathed about 3,000 of his works to The Higgins Art Gallery & Museum, Bedford.

His work can be seen in many major collections and is shown regularly at the Fry Art Gallery, Saffron Walden and at the Higgins. His notable surviving public works include a tile depicting a foot ferry on the River Lea, commissioned by London Underground and located on the Victoria line platform at Tottenham Hale tube station. Bawden also produced the cameo-like silhouette of Queen Victoria located at Victoria tube station. An early map, produced in 1931 for Scarborough's Pavilion Hotel and presented to Scarborough Library when the hotel was sold, was recently restored and rehung in the library.

The original Morley College mural that Bawden created in the 1930s was destroyed during a wartime bombing raid; however the rebuilt and relocated college on the South Bank contains a fine surviving mural by him. In 1965 Bawden completed a mural for Queen's University, Belfast and his last major commission, completed in 1972, was for an historical mural inside Blackwell's bookshop in Oxford.

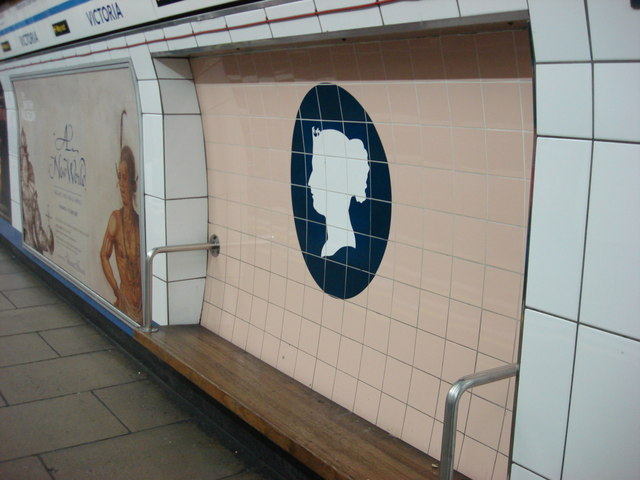
Queen Victoria tile at Victoria tube station

== Teaching, appointments and awards ==
Having briefly taught design and book illustration at Goldsmiths, University of London, from 1928 to 1931, Bawden then went on to teach at the Royal College of Art between 1930 and 1963 (except for the years of World War II). In 1968, he became a tutor at the Royal Academy Schools. In 1969 Bawden became a Senior Part-Time Lecturer in Graphics at the City of Leicester Polytechnic.

Among his numerous appointments and awards that came later in his career are:

- 1946 – Appointed a Commander of the Order of the British Empire (CBE)
- 1947 – Associate of the Royal Academy
- 1949 – Royal Designer for Industry (RSA)
- 1949/50 – Guest instructor for the Summers of 1949/50 at the Banff School of Fine Art, Canada
- 1951 – Trustee of the Tate Gallery (1951–1958
- 1956 – Elected Royal Academician
- 1962 – Honorary Associate of Manchester College of Art
- 1963 – Honorary Fellow of the Royal College of Art
- 1964 – Silver Medal from the Society of Industrial Artists
- 1970 – Honorary Doctorate from the Royal College of Art
- 1974 – Honorary Doctorate from the University of Essex
- 1979 – Honorary Fellow of the Royal Society of Painter-Etchers and Engravers

== Writings by Bawden ==
- Life in an English Village (King Penguin Books No. 51) (1949, Penguin Books)
- The English Scene (1952, Sheneval Press)
- Hold Fast By Your Teeth (1963, Routledge & Kegan Paul)
- Travels of a War Artist 1940–45 (1983, Imperial War Museum)
- Edward Bawden, war artist, and his letters home, 1940–1945 edited by Ruari McLean. 1989, Scolar Press, Aldershot, in association with the Imperial War Museum
