= Gallup Korea's Favorite Singer =

Recurring survey

Gallup Korea's Favorite Singer is a recurring survey conducted as part of the "What Koreans Like" (Korean: 한국인이 좋아하는) series. Launched in 2004 to commemorate the 30th anniversary of Gallup Korea's founding, the survey is conducted every five years to explore various aspects of South Korean lifestyle and culture. This survey is distinct from the Gallup Korea's Singer of Year. Unlike the annual "Singer of the Year" polls, which have been released every December since 2005 to highlight the most impactful performances of a specific year, the "Favorite Singer" survey measures long-term public preference and is released only every five years.

== 1994 ==
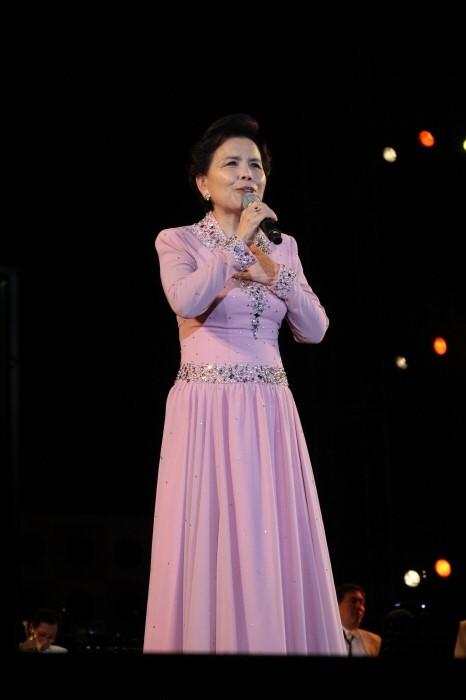
Lee Mi-ja

Top 10 Favorite Korean Singers of 1994
Rank	Name
1st	Lee Mi-ja
2nd	Cho Yong-pil
3rd	Hyun Cheol
4th	Na Hoon-a
5th	Seol Woon-do
5th	Patty Kim
5th	Choi Jin-hee
6th	—N/a
7th	—N/a
8th	Shin Seung-hoon
9th	Seo Taiji
9th	Kim Won-jun
10th	—N/a

== 2004 ==
Survey overview:

- Survey period: May 13 to 29, 2004
- Survey area: Nationwide (excluding Jeju Island)
- Survey subjects: Men and women aged 15 or older
- Sample size: 1,728 people
- Survey method: Household visit individual interview

Top 10 Favorite Korean Singers of 2004
Rank	Name	%
1st	Lee Mi-ja	5.6
2nd	Na Hoon-a	5.1
2nd	Rain	5.1
3rd	—N/a	
4th	Cho Yong-pil	4.8
4th	Hyun-cheol	3.8
6th	Tae Jin-ah	2.9
7th	Shin Seung-hoon	2.7
8th	Song Dae-gwan	2.5
9th	Kim Gun-mo	2.4
10th	Seol Woon-do	2.2

== 2009 ==
Survey Overview:

- Survey Period: May 20, 2009 – June 3, 2009
- Survey area: Nationwide (excluding Jeju Island)
- Survey subjects: Men and women aged 15 or older
- Sample size: 1,700 people

Top 10 Favorite Korean Singers of 2009
Rank	Name	%
1st	Jang Yoon-jeong	7.4
2nd	BIGBANG	6.8
3rd	Tae Jin-ah	4.3
4th	Lee Mi-ja	4.2
5th	Girls' Generation	4.0
6th	Na Hoon-a	3.6
7th	Cho Yong-pil	3.2
8th	Hyuncheol	3.0
8th	Son Dam-bi	3.0
8th	Lee Seung-chul	3.0
9th	—N/a	
10th	—N/a	

== 2014 ==
Survey Overview:

- Survey Period: October 2nd to 29th, 2013
- Survey area: Nationwide (excluding Jeju Island)
- Survey subjects: Men and women aged 15 or older
- Sample size: 1,700 people

Top 10 Favorite Korean Singers of 2014
Rank	Name	%
1st	Cho Yong-pil	7.2
2nd	Lee Sun-hee	4.4
3rd	Jang Yoon-jeong	3.9
4th	IU	3.6
5th	Tae Jin-ah	3.3
6th	EXO	2.9
7th	Lee Seung-chul	2.8
7th	Lee Mi-ja	2.8
8th	—N/a	
9th	Na Hoon-a	2.5
10th	Girls' Generation	2.1

== 2019 ==
Survey Overview:

- Survey period: May 9–25, 2019
- Survey area: Nationwide (excluding Jeju Island)
- Survey subjects: Men and women aged 15 or older
- Sample size: 1,700

Top 10 Favorite Korean Singers of 2019
Rank	Name	%
1st	BTS	9.6
2nd	Jang Yoon-jeong	6.8
3rd	Na Hoon-a	4.6
4th	IU	3.5
5th	Cho Yong-pil	3.4
6th	Lee Sun-hee	2.6
7th	Tae Jin-ah	2.3
7th	Lee Mi-ja	2.3
8th	—N/a	
9th	Lee Seung-chul	2.1
10th	Kim Yeon-ja	2.0
10th	Lee Moon-sae	2.0
10th	Hong Jin-young	2.0
10th	Twice	2.0
10th	Park Hyo-shin	2.0

== 2024 ==
Survey Overview:

- Survey Period: March 22, 2024 - April 5
- Survey area: Nationwide (excluding Jeju Island)
- Survey subjects: Men and women aged 15 or older
- Sample size: 1,777 people aged 13 or older

Top 10 Favorite Korean Singers of 2024
Rank	Name	%
1st	Lim Young-woong	10.3
2nd	IU	9.0
3rd	BTS	4.9
4th	Na Hoon-a	4.0
5th	NewJeans	3.5
6th	Jang Yoon-jeong	3.4
7th	Jin Sung	2.7
8th	Young Tak	2.4
8th	Song Ga-in	2.4
9th	—N/a	
10th	Blackpink	2.2

== See also ==
- Gallup Korea's Singer of the Year
- Gallup Korea's Song of the Year
- Gallup Korea's Favorite Actor
