= Gallup Korea =

South Korean market research company

- Logo since 2019
- Native name: 한국갤럽
- Romanized name: Hangukgaelleop
- Formerly: Korea Survey Polls (1974–79)
- Type: Private
- Industry: Market research
- Founded: June 17, 1974; 52 years ago in Seoul, South Korea
- Founder: Park Moo-ik
- Headquarters: 70 Sajik-ro, Jongno-gu, Seoul, South Korea
- Key people: Park Jae-hyung (Vice-chairman)
- Services: Opinion polling; Publishing
- Net income: ▼ ₩1.3 billion (2021)
- Number of employees: 184 (2021)
- Website: www.gallup.co.kr

Gallup Korea (Korean: 한국갤럽) or Gallup Korea Research Institute (Korean: 한국갤럽조사연구소) is a South Korean research company. Founded by Park Moo-ik in 1974, the company became a member of Gallup International Association in 1979. It is best known for conducting public surveys on political, entertainment, sports, as well as on social subjects. In 2012, it started its own survey program called 'Gallup Korea Daily Opinion', which announces new survey results every week.

== History ==
Park Moo-ik (1943–2017) founded the South Korea's first public opinion survey company, Korea Survey Polls, in Jongno-gu, Seoul, in 1974. Started correspondence with George Gallup in 1977, the company became a member of Gallup International Association in 1979. In the same year, with George Gallup's consent for exclusive use of the "Gallup" trademark, the company changed its name to Gallup Korea or Gallup Korea Research Institute.

In 1987, Gallup Korea, headed by Park Moo-ik, became the first company to successfully predict the results of a presidential election in South Korea. Furthermore, it almost correctly projected the number of votes won by the candidates in the 1997 South Korean presidential election.

In the 1990s, Gallup Korea established a database dedicated to survey results for the first time in South Korea.

In 2006, Gallup Korea in association with Korean Statistical Society, established the Gallup Korea Academic Award (Korean: 한국갤럽학술상) to encourage the development of statistics and research activities in related fields. Since then it has become one of the most prestigious award in the field of statistics in South Korea.

In March 2021, Gallup Korea signed a memorandum of understanding with KT Corporation to introduce artificial intelligence technology in opinion polls.

== Services ==
Gallup Korea is known for its public surveys or opinion polls. It conducts various periodic public surveys to check current popularity and influence of political leaders, entertainers and sports athletes. In 2012, it started its own survey program called 'Gallup Korea Daily Opinion', through which new survey results are announced every week which are free to be used by anyone. It has also published books, including monographs and periodicals, as a result of its own survey since 1978.

== Survey ==
=== Annual surveys ===
- Gallup Korea's Actor of the Year
- Gallup Korea's Athlete of the Year
- Gallup Korea's Singer of the Year
- Gallup Korea's Song of the Year
- Gallup Korea's Entertainer/Comedian of the Year

=== Quinquineal Surveys ===
- Gallup Korea's Favorite Actor
- Gallup Korea's Favorite Singer
