= Gallup Korea's Favorite Actor =

Recurring survey

Gallup Korea's Favorite Actor is a recurring survey conducted as part of the "What Koreans Like" (Korean: 한국인이 좋아하는) series. Launched in 2004 to commemorate the 30th anniversary of Gallup Korea's founding, the survey is conducted every five years to explore various aspects of South Korean lifestyle and culture.

While an integrated poll featuring both film and television actors was initially conducted in 1994, the survey was split into two distinct categories starting in 2004: Favorite Film Actor (Korean: 한국인이 좋아하는 영화배우) and Favorite Television Actor (or "Talent"; 한국인이 좋아하는 탤런트). This survey is distinct from the Gallup Korea's Actor of the Year rankings for Film and Television. Unlike the annual "Actor of the Year" polls, which have been released every December since 2005 to highlight the most impactful performances of a specific year, the "Favorite Actor" survey measures long-term public preference and is released only every five years.

Choi Bool-am holds the record for topping the Favorite Television Actor poll three times (1994, 2004, and 2014). In the film category, Ahn Sung-ki (2004, 2009) and Choi Min-sik (2014, 2024) are tied for the most wins with two each. Among actresses, Kim Hye-ja holds the record for the most wins, notably topping the television category (1994, 2009).

== Top 20 by Year ==
=== 1994 ===
Gallup Report November–December 1994 (Volume 15), Published on December 5, 1994.

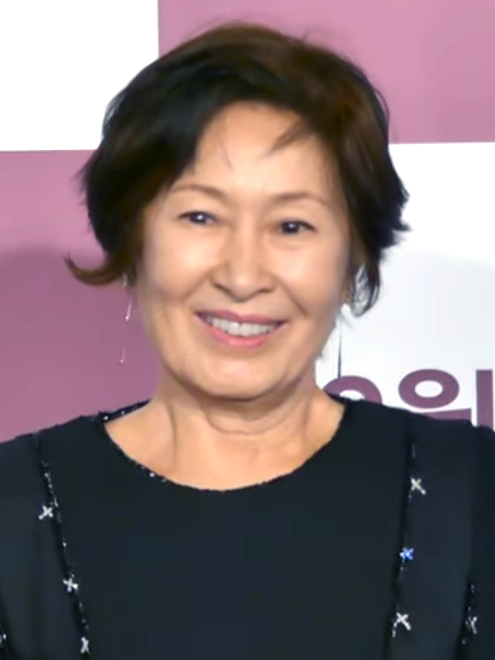
Kim Hye-ja, 1994 Favorite Actor (1st place)

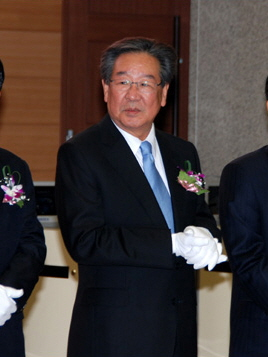
Choi Bool-am, 1994 Favorite Actor(2nd place)

Top 15 Favorite Korean Actors of 1994
Rank	Name
1st	Kim Hye-ja
2nd	Choi Bool-am
3rd	Ahn Sung-ki
4th	Choi Jin-sil
5th	Park Joong-hoon
5th	Choi Min-soo
6th	—N/a
7th	Yu In-chon
8th	Lee Deok-hwa
9th	Chae Shi-ra
10th	Shin Seong-il
11th to 15th	Go Doo-shim
11th to 15th	Kim Ji-mi
11th to 15th	Eom Aeng-ran
11th to 15th	Lee Gyeong-yeong
11th to 15th	Cha In-pyo

=== 2004 ===
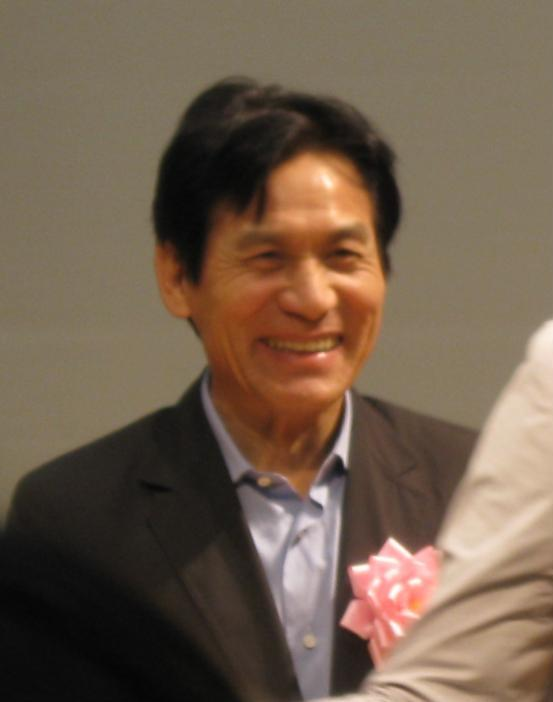
Ahn Sung-ki, 2004 Favorite Film Actor

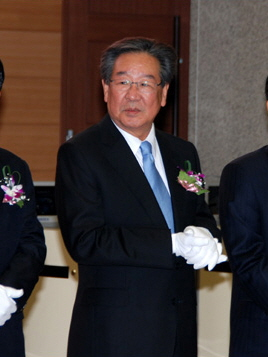
Choi Bool-am, 2004 Favorite Television Actor

Survey overview:

- Survey period: May 13 to 29, 2004
- Survey area: Nationwide (excluding Jeju Island)
- Survey subjects: Men and women aged 15 or older
- Sample size: 1,728 people
- Survey method: Household visit individual interview

Top 20 Favorite Korean Actors of 2004
Rank	Film Actors		Television Actors	
Rank	Name	%	Name	%
1st	Ahn Sung-ki	13.4	Choi Bool-am	4.1
2nd	Jang Dong-gun	7.4	Lee Young-ae	3.5
3rd	Sul Kyung-gu	3.8	Kwon Sang-woo	3.3
4th	Choi Min-sik	3.5	Kim Hye-ja	2.3
5th	Han Seok-kyu	3.3	Go Doo-shim	2.0
6th	Song Kang-ho	2.8	Choi Soo-jong	1.8
7th	Shin Seong-il	2.6	Song Hye-kyo	1.7
7th	Park Joong-hoon	2.6	Jang Dong-gun	1.7
8th	—N/a		—N/a	
9th	Jung Woo-sung	2.1	Chae Shi-ra	1.5
10th	Won Bin	2.0	Lee Seo-jin	1.3
11th	Jun Ji-hyun	1.7	—N/a	
12th	—N/a		—N/a	
13th	Eom Aeng-ran	1.0	—N/a	
14th	—N/a		—N/a	
15th	—N/a		—N/a	
16th	—N/a		—N/a	
17th	Jeon Do-yeon	0.9	—N/a	
18th	—N/a		—N/a	
19th	—N/a		—N/a	
20th	—N/a		—N/a	

=== 2009 ===
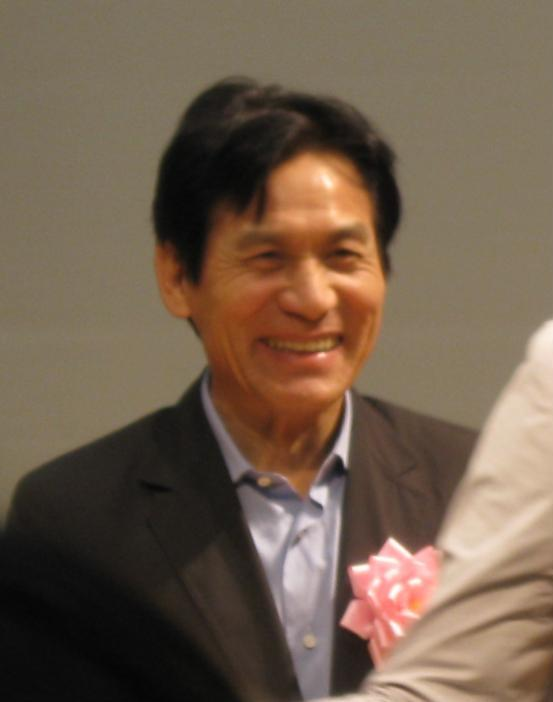
Ahn Sung-ki, 2009 Favorite Film Actor

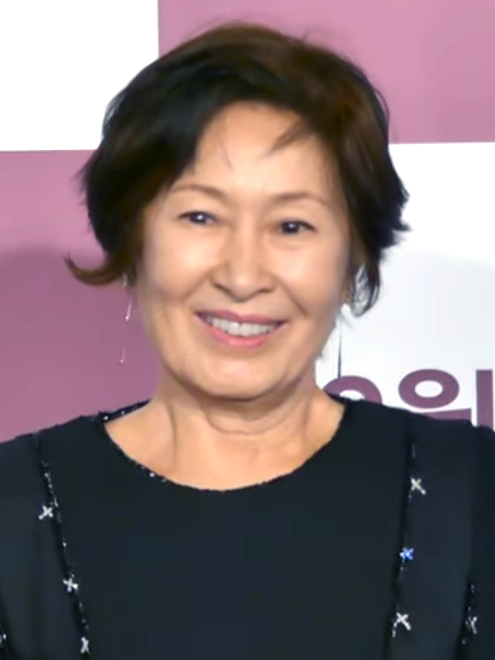
Kim Hye-ja, 2009 Favorite Television Actor

Survey Overview:

- Survey Period: May 20, 2009 – June 3, 2009
- Survey area: Nationwide (excluding Jeju Island)
- Survey subjects: Men and women aged 15 or older
- Sample size: 1,700 people

Top 10 Favorite Korean Actors of 2009
Rank	Film Actors		Television Actors	
Rank	Name	%	Name	%
1st	Ahn Sung-ki	9.2	Kim Hye-ja	6.1
2nd	Song Kang-ho	6.3	Choi Bool-am	4.3
3rd	Jang Dong-gun	5.4	Kim Tae-hee	2.9
4th	Sul Kyung-gu	5.2	Lee Soon-jae	2.5
5th	Shin Seong-il	3.9	So Ji-sub	2.0
6th	Jung Woo-sung	1.7	Kim Nam-joo	1.9
7th	Hwang Jung-min	1.6	Kang Boo-ja	1.7
8th	Kim Su-ro	1.4	Lee Min-ho	1.5
8th	Kim Su-ro	1.4	Jang Dong-gun	1.5
9th	Jeong Jun-ho	1.4	—N/a	
10th	Kim Hye-soo	1.3	Go Doo-shim	1.4

Top 5 Favorite Film Actors by Demographic (Age) of 2009
#	10		20		30		40		50	
#	Name	%	Name	%	Name	%	Name	%	Name	%
1st	Ahn Sung-ki	8.0	Sul Kyung-gu	8.5	Jang Dong-gun	9.3	Ahn Sung-ki	15.1	Ahn Sung-ki	11.2
2nd	Kim Soo-ro	6.1	Song Kang-ho	8.2	Song Kang-ho	9.0	Song Kang-ho	8.2	Shin Seong-il	10.5
3rd	Song Kang-ho	5.6	Jang Dong-gun	7.8	Sul Kyung-gu	8.9	Sul Kyung-gu	6.2	Song Kang-ho	2.4
3rd	Song Kang-ho	5.6	Jang Dong-gun	7.8	Sul Kyung-gu	8.9	Sul Kyung-gu	6.2	Jang Dong-gun	2.4
4th	Song Kang-ho	2.5	Hwang Jung-min	5.0	Ahn Sung-ki	8.3	Jang Dong-gun	2.9	—N/a	
4th	Song Kang-ho	2.5	Hwang Jung-min	5.0	Ahn Sung-ki	8.3	Shin Seong-il	2.9	—N/a	
4th	Song Kang-ho	2.5	Hwang Jung-min	5.0	Ahn Sung-ki	8.3	Kim Hye-soo	2.9	—N/a	
5th	Kim Hye-soo	2.0	Jang Dong-gun	4.7	Jung Woo-sung	2.7	—N/a		Sul Kyung-gu	1.4

Top 5 Favorite Television Actors by Demographic (Age) of 2009
#	10		20		30		40		50	
#	Name	%	Name	%	Name	%	Name	%	Name	%
1st	Kim Tae-hee	7.4	Kim Tae-hee	5.5	Kim Tae-hee	3.2	Kim Hye-ja	7.3	Kim Hye-ja	13.5
1st	Kim Tae-hee	7.4	So Ji-sub	5.5	Kim Tae-hee	3.2	Kim Hye-ja	7.3	Kim Hye-ja	13.5
2nd	Lee Min-ho	4.9	—N/a		Kim Nam-joo	3.1	Choi Bool-am	7.2	Choi Bool-am	7.8
3rd	Jang Dong-gun	2.0	Lee Min-ho	3.9	Jang Dong-gun	2.9	Kim Nam-joo	2.6	Lee Soon-jae	5.9
4th	So Ji-sub	2.1	Jang Dong-gun	2.9	So Ji-sub	2.1	Go Doo-shim	2.5	Kang Boo-ja	5.0
5th	Kim Nam-joo	1.4	Kim Nam-joo	1.8	Lee Soon-jae	2.7	Kim Tae-hee	2.7	Go Doo-shim	2.2

=== 2014 ===
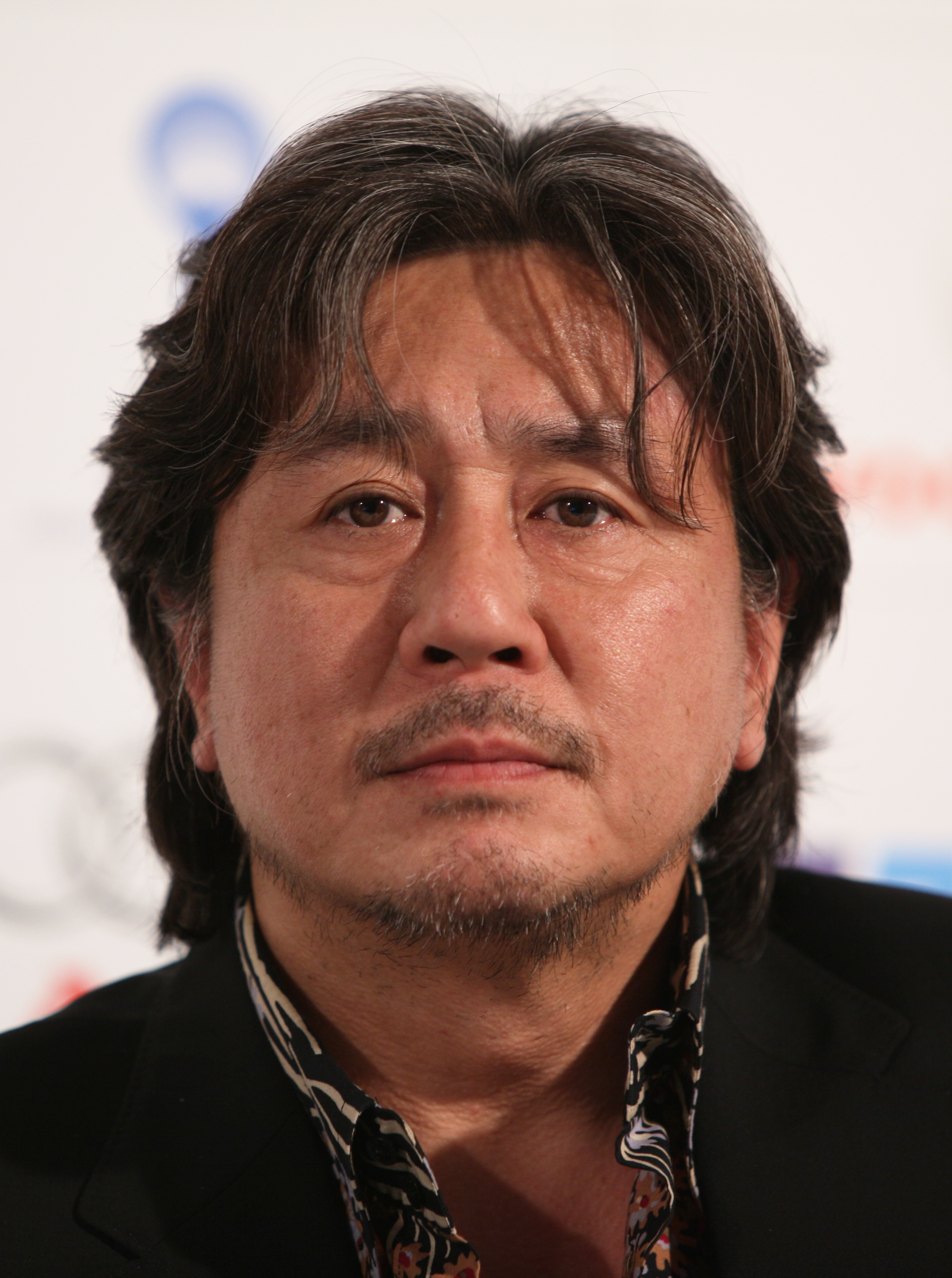
Choi Min-sik, 2014 Favorite Fim Actor

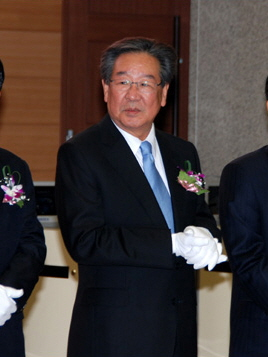
Choi Bool-am, 2014 Favorite Television Actor (#2)

Survey Overview:

- Survey Period: October 2nd to 29th, 2013
- Survey area: Nationwide (excluding Jeju Island)
- Survey subjects: Men and women aged 15 or older
- Sample size: 1,700 people

Top 20 Favorite Korean Actors of 2014
Rank	Film Actors		Television Actors	
Rank	Name	%	Name	%
1st	Choi Min-sik	7.5	Kim Soo-hyun	4.3
2nd	Song Kang-ho	6.9	Choi Bool-am	4.2
3rd	Ahn Sung-ki	6.5	Zo In-sung	3.3
4th	Ha Jung-woo	3.7	Kim Tae-hee	3.1
4th	Ha Jung-woo	3.7	Song Hye-kyo	3.0
5th	Jun Ji-hyun	3.1	Go Doo-shim	2.6
6th	Ryu Seung-ryong	3.3	Lee Soon-jae	2.5
7th	Jang Dong-gun	3.2	Kim Hye-ja	2.4
8th	Sul Kyung-gu	3.1	Kim Hee-ae	2.4
9th	Won Bin	2.7	Lee Yu-ri	2.2
9th	Jung Woo-sung	2.7	Lee Yu-ri	2.2
10th	—N/a		Yoo Dong-geun	2.1
10th	—N/a		Hyun Bin	2.1
11th	Zo In-sung	2.2	—N/a	
12th	Lee Byung-hun	2.1	—N/a	
13th	Lee Jung-jae	1.8	—N/a	
13th	Shin Seong-il	1.8	—N/a	
14th	—N/a		—N/a	
15th	—N/a		—N/a	
17th	Kim Hye-soo	1.7	—N/a	
15th	—N/a		—N/a	
18th	Han Seok-kyu	1.6	—N/a	
18th	Kang Dong-won	1.6	—N/a	
19th	Cha Tae-hyun	1.5	—N/a	
20th	—N/a		—N/a	

=== 2019 ===
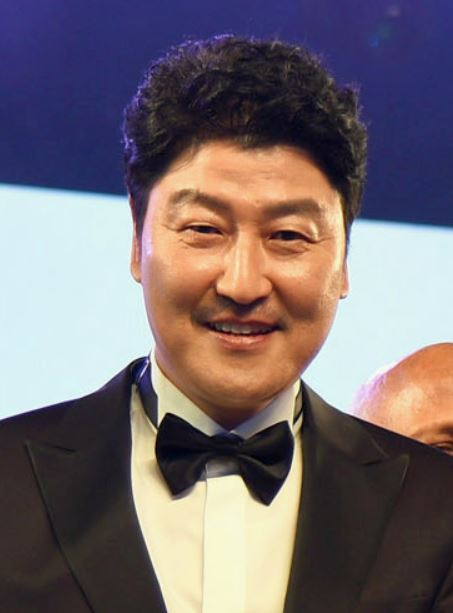
Song Kang-ho, 2019 Favorite Film Actor

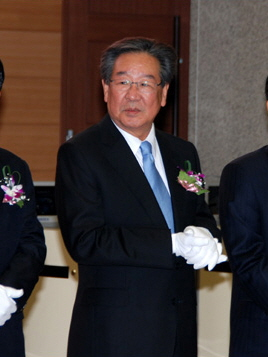
Choi Bool-am, 2019 Favorite Television

Survey Overview:

- Survey period: May 9–25, 2019
- Survey area: Nationwide (excluding Jeju Island)
- Survey subjects: Men and women aged 15 or older
- Sample size: 1,700

Top 20 Favorite Korean Actors of 2019
Rank	Film Actors		Television Actors	
Rank	Name	%	Name	%
1st	Song Kang-ho	10.1	Choi Bool-am	5.4
2nd	Ma Dong-seok	6.0	Kim Hye-ja	4.2
3rd	Ahn Sung-ki	5.8	Park Bo-gum	3.6
4th	Ha Jung-woo	5.1	Hyun Bin	3.0
4th	Ha Jung-woo	5.1	Song Hye-kyo	3.0
5th	Jung Woo-sung	4.8	—N/a	
6th	Lee Byung-hun	3.8	Lee Soon-jae	2.9
7th	Hwang Jung-min	3.3	Go Doo-shim	2.7
8th	Yoo Hae-jin	3.1	Choi Soo-jong	2.5
9th	Jang Dong-gun	3.0	Song Joong-ki	1.7
10th	Shin Seong-il	2.5	Jun Ji-hyun	1.5
11th	Kim Hye-soo	2.3	—N/a	
12th	Sul Kyung-gu	2.1	—N/a	
13th	Choi Min-sik	1.8	—N/a	
14th	Gong Yoo	1.6	—N/a	
15th	Cha Seung-won	1.5	—N/a	
15th	Jun Ji-hyun	1.5	—N/a	
17th	Zo In-sung	1.3	—N/a	
18th	Hyun Bin	1.1	—N/a	
19th	Kang Dong-won	1.0	—N/a	
19th	Lee Jung-jae	1.0	—N/a	
19th	Han Suk-kyu	1.0	—N/a	
19th	Song Joong-ki	1.0	—N/a	

=== 2024 ===
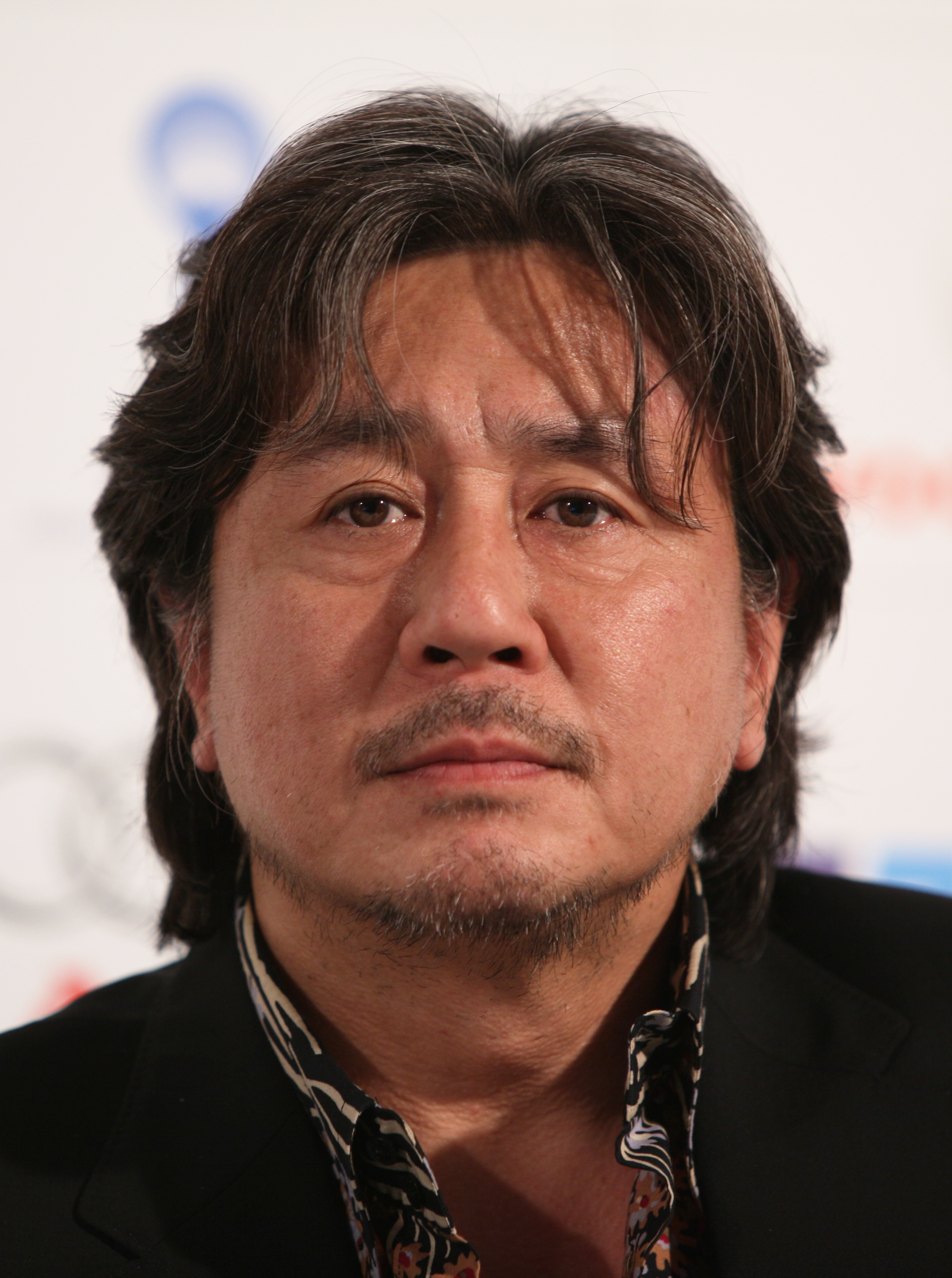
Choi Min-sik, 2024 Fim Actor of the Year

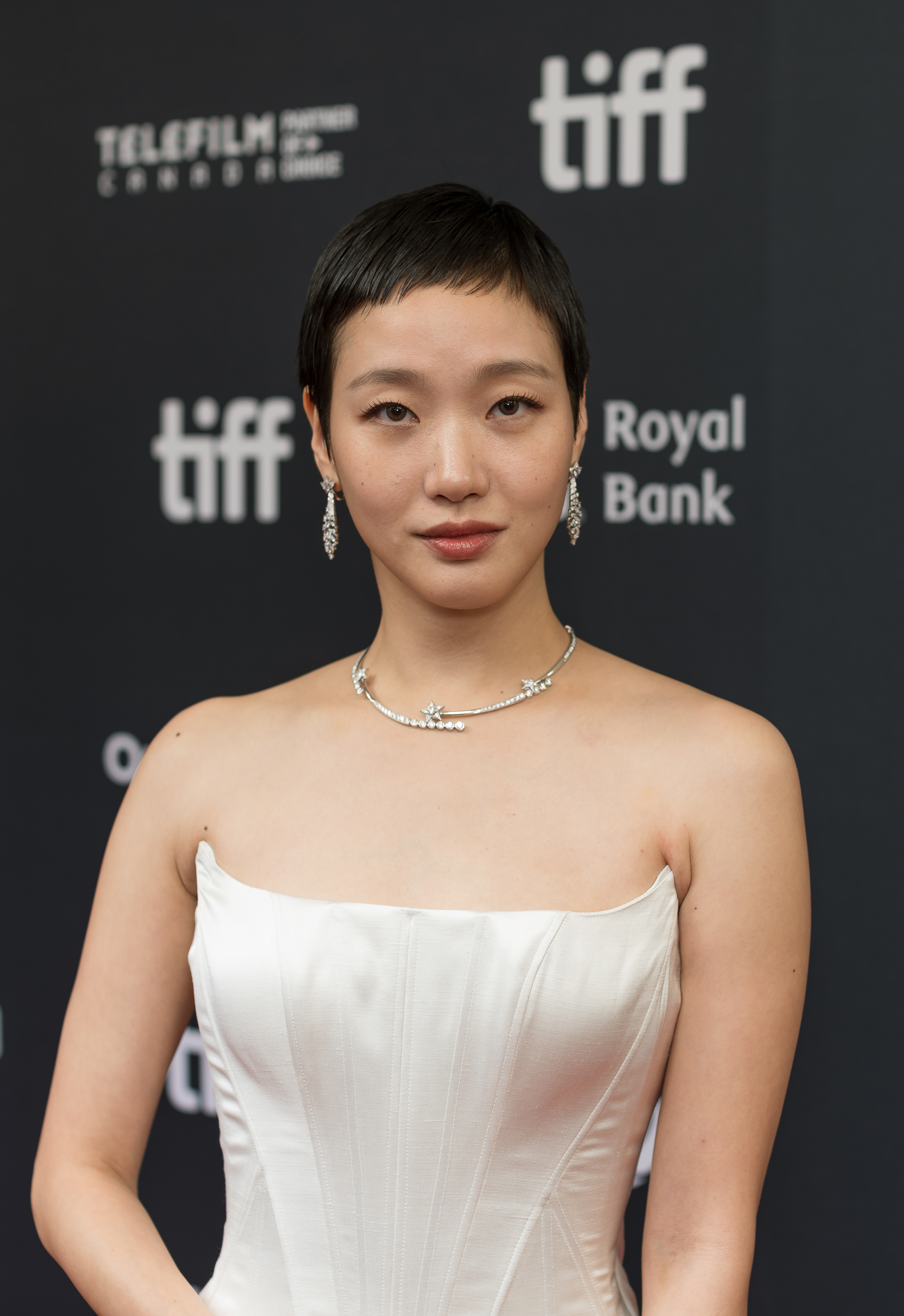
Kim Go-eun placed in Top 10 in both film and television categories

Survey Overview:

- Survey Period: March 22, 2024 - April 5, 2024
- Survey area: Nationwide (excluding Jeju Island)
- Survey subjects: Men and women aged 13 or older
- Sample size: 1,777 people

Top 20 Favorite Korean Actors of 2024
Rank	Film Actors		Television Actors	
Rank	Name	%	Name	%
1st	Choi Min-sik	8.1	Kim Soo-hyun	6.4
2nd	Ma Dong-seok	7.1	Namkoong Min	2.9
2nd	Ma Dong-seok	7.1	Kim Ji-won	2.9
3rd	Song Kang-ho	7.0	—N/a	
4th	Lee Byung-hun	4.7	Cha Eun-woo	2.7
4th	Lee Byung-hun	4.7	Kim Nam-joo	2.7
5th	Jung Woo-sung	4.2	—N/a	
6th	Lee Jung-jae	3.7	Choi Soo-jong	2.5
6th	Hwang Jung-min	3.7	Choi Soo-jong	2.5
7th	—N/a		Song Joong-ki	2.3
8th	Kim Hye-soo	3.4	Choi Bool-am	2.2
8th	Kim Go-eun	3.4	Choi Bool-am	2.2
9th	—N/a		Go Doo-shim	2.0
10th	Son Seok-gu	3.1	Kim Go-eun	1.8
11th	Yoo Hae-jin	2.9	—N/a	
12th	Youn Yuh-jung	2.1	—N/a	
12th	Gong Yoo	2.1	—N/a	
13th	—N/a		—N/a	
14th	Han Seok-kyu	1.6	—N/a	
15th	Hyun Bin	1.5	—N/a	
16th	Song Joong-ki	1.4	—N/a	
17th	Ahn Sung-ki	1.3	—N/a	
17th	Jun Ji-hyun	1.3	—N/a	
19th	Ha Jung-woo	1.0	—N/a	
20th	—N/a		—N/a	

== See also ==
- Gallup Korea's Actor of the Year
- Gallup Korea's Favorite Singer
