= Gallup Korea's Actor of the Year =

Gallup Korea's Film Actor of the Year (Korean: 한국갤럽 올해를 빛낸 영화배우) and Gallup Korea's Television Actor of the Year (한국갤럽 올해를 빛낸 탤런트) are annually selected through a year-end public survey conducted across South Korea by Gallup Korea. The survey, first conducted in 2005, includes respondents who are South Koreans aged 13 and older. This survey is distinct from the Gallup Korea's Favorite Actor, which measures long-term public preference and is released only every five years.

Song Kang-ho has been selected as Film Actor of the Year five times (2008, 2013, 2017, 2019, 2020) and has placed within the top 10 a total of 17 times. Lee Byung-hun has ranked first three times in the film category (2009, 2012, 2025) and once in the television category (2018). Ma Dong-seok has ranked first in the film category thrice (2018, 2023, 2024). Among actresses, Go Hyun-jung has led the Television Actor of the Year poll twice (2009, 2010). Actors Song Joong-ki (2012, 2017) and Park Bo-gum (2016, 2025) have each topped the Television Actor of the Year poll twice as well. In 2016, Park was the youngest actor to achieve a first-place ranking in the survey at age 23 and later became the first actor to top the poll for a streaming project in 2025.

== Top 10 by year ==
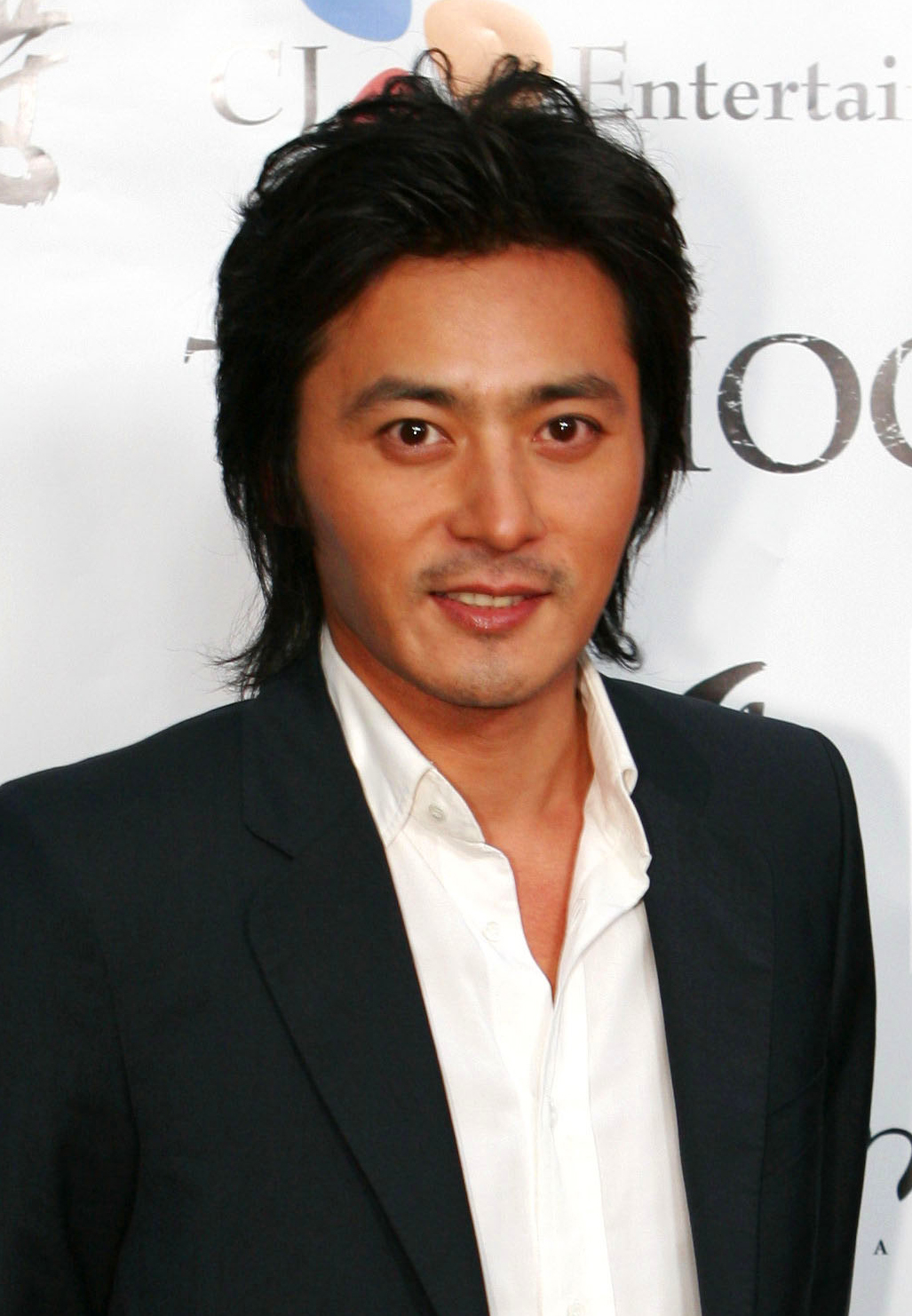
Jang Dong-gun, 2005 Fim Actor of the Year

Survey period: December 5–16, 2005

Rank	Film		Television	
Rank	Name	%	Name	%
1st	Jang Dong-gun	20.4	Choi Jin-sil	18.2
2nd	Lee Young-ae	17.5	Kim Sun-ah	10.3
3rd	Jeon Do-yeon	12.1	Lee Young-ae	6.2
4th	Hwang Jung-min	11.5	Jeon Do-yeon	5.2
5th	Bae Yong-joon	9.4	Jeong Ji-hoon	4.2
6th	Cho Seung-woo	5.9	Son Hyun-joo	4.0
7th	Ahn Sung-ki	4.8	Bae Yong-joon	3.5
8th	Kang Hye-jung	4.1	Go Doo-shim	3.2
9th	Choi Min-sik	3.6	Han Hye-jin	3.1
10th	Won Bin	2.8	Hyun Bin	3.1

=== 2007 ===
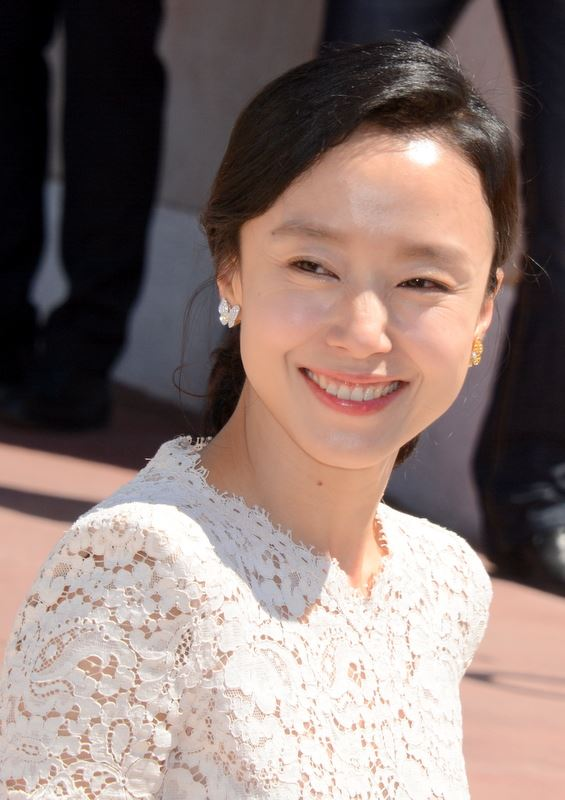
Jeon Do-yeon, 2007 Fim Actor of the Year

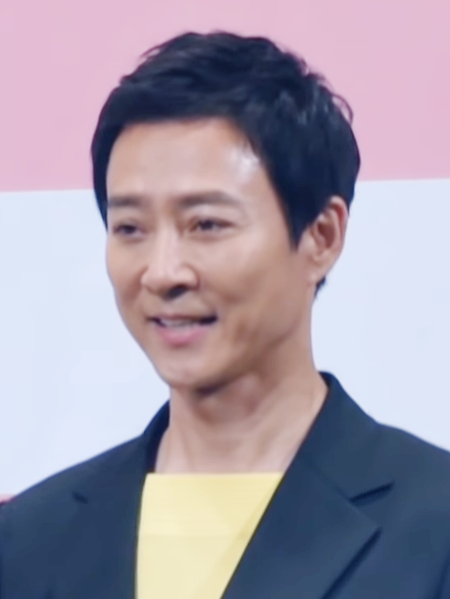
Choi Soo-jong, 2007 Television Actor of the Year

Survey period: December 5–16, 2007

Rank	Film		Television	
Rank	Name	%	Name	%
1st	Jeon Do-yeon	49.7	Choi Soo-jong	23.3
2nd	Song Kang-ho	16.5	Bae Yong-joon	18.8
3rd	Bae Yong-joon	6.4	Song Il-gook	18.1
4th	Ahn Sung-ki	6.4	Lee Seo-jin	3.5
5th	Sol Kyung-gu	5.0	Kim Tae-hee	2.8

=== 2008 ===
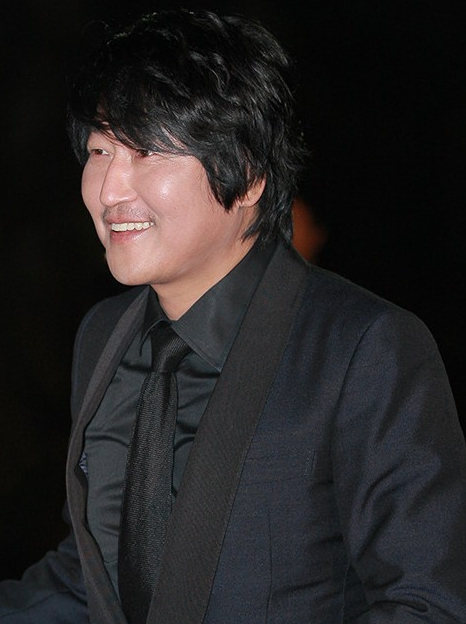
Song Kang-ho, 2008 Fim Actor of the Year

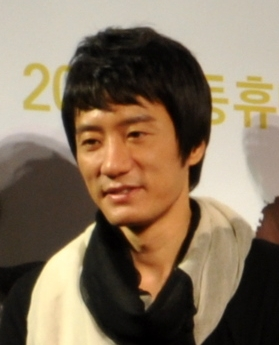
Kim Myung-min, 2008 Television Actor of the Year

Survey period: November 19 – December 4, 2008

Rank	Film		Television	
Rank	Name	%	Name	%
1st	Song Kang-ho	13.1	Kim Myung-min	15.6
2nd	Son Ye-jin	11.3	Song Seung-heon	10.6
3rd	Kim Hye-soo	7.4	Moon Geun-young	9.8
4th	Jeon Do-yeon	7.3	Song Il-gook	8.8
5th	Jang Dong-gun	7.3	Choi Jin-sil	8.1
6th	Jung Woo-sung	6.1	Kim Hye-ja	6.6
7th	Ha Jung-woo	5.4	Lee Soon-jae	5.3
8th	Moon Geun-young	4.7	Jang Hyuk	5.2
9th	Ahn Sung-ki	4.6	Jang Mi-hee	3.9
10th	Lee Byung-hun	4.4	Han Ye-seul	4.2

Demographic Leaders: Kim Myung-min (20s–40s), Choi Jin-sil (50+).

=== 2009 ===
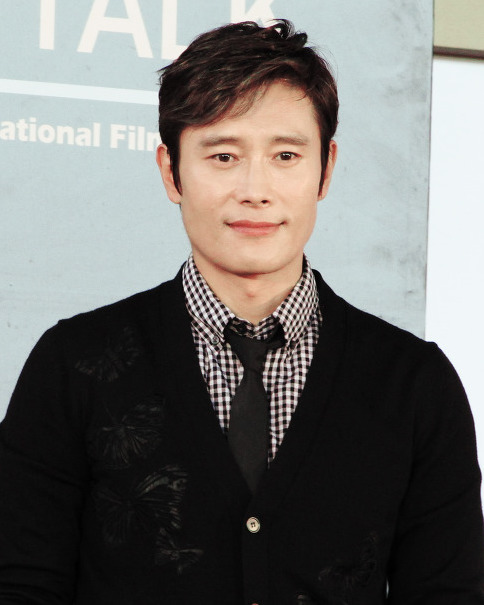
Lee Byung-hun, 2009 Fim Actor of the Year

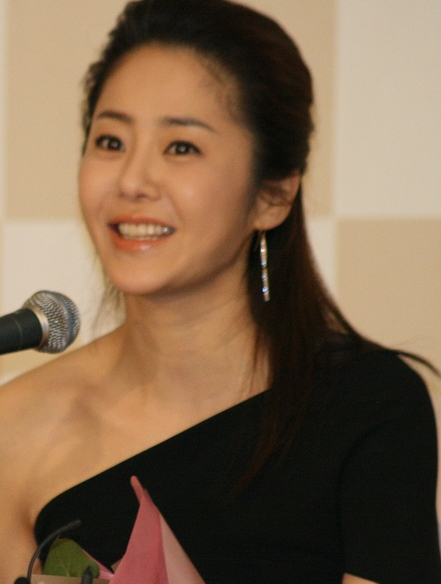
Go Hyun-jung, 2009 Television Actor of the Year

Survey period: November 12–30, 2009

Rank	Film		Television	
Rank	Name	%	Name	%
1st	Lee Byung-hun	20.1	Go Hyun-jung	38.4
2nd	Jang Dong-gun	17.9	Lee Byung-hun	20.5
3rd	Sol Kyung-gu	17.5	Kim Tae-hee	16.3
4th	Ha Ji-won	14.3	Lee Yo-won	8.4
5th	Jeong Ji-hoon	8.3	Kim Hye-soo	4.1
6th	—N/a		Choi Bool-am	3.7
7th	—N/a		Lee Soon-jae	3.6
8th	—N/a		Kim Nam-joo	2.9
9th	—N/a		Lee Seung-gi	2.6
10th	—N/a		Jang Keun-suk	2.5

=== 2010 ===
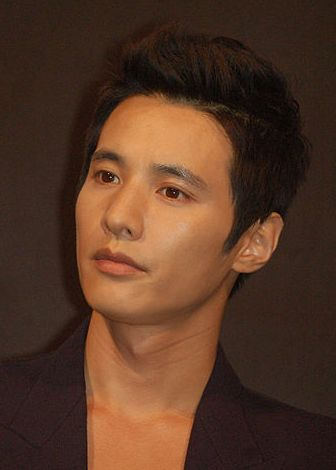
Won Bin, 2010 Fim Actor of the Year

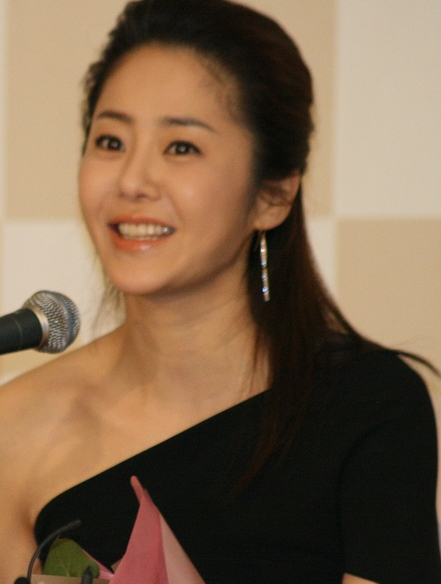
Go Hyun-jung, 2010 Television Actor of the Year

Survey period: November 17 – December 7, 2010

Rank	Film		Television	
Rank	Name	%	Name	%
1st	Won Bin	30.7	Go Hyun-jung	29.5
2nd	Jang Dong-gun	14.4	Kim Nam-joo	6.5
3rd	Kang Dong-won	11.6	Lee Beom-soo	6.5
4th	Lee Byung-hun	6.4	Kwon Sang-woo	5.1
5th	Song Kang-ho	5.6	Hyun Bin	5.0
6th	Jeong Ji-hoon	4.0	Jeong Ji-hoon	4.8
7th	Kim Hye-soo	2.8	Lee Seung-gi	3.8
8th	Jeon Do-yeon	2.8	Go Doo-shim	3.5
9th	Jung Woo-sung	2.2	Jung Bo-seok	3.3
10th	Yoon Jeong-hee	1.7	Lee Soon-jae	3.2

=== 2011 ===
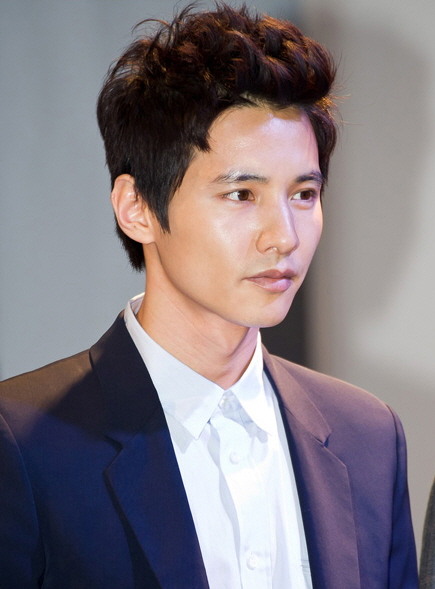
Won Bin, 2011 Fim Actor of the Year

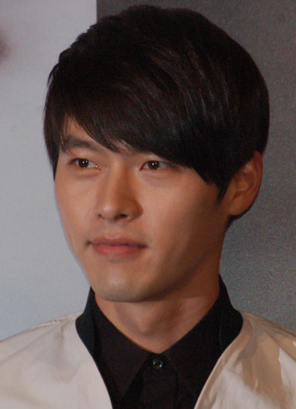
Hyun Bin, 2011 Television Actor of the Year

Survey period: November 17 – December 7, 2011

Rank	Film		Television	
Rank	Name	%	Name	%
1st	Won Bin	11.3	Hyun Bin	9.2
2nd	Park Hae-il	9.5	Han Suk-kyu	7.1
3rd	Jang Dong-gun	8.8	Kim Tae-hee	7.0
4th	Kim Ha-neul	8.2	Soo-ae	6.7
5th	Gong Yoo	5.8	Jang Hyuk	6.1
6th	Lee Byung-hun	4.8	Go Doo-shim	5.9
7th	Song Kang-ho	4.4	Song Joong-ki	4.7
8th	Ha Ji-won	3.1	Lee Soon-jae	4.1
9th	Ahn Sung-ki	3.0	Lee Seung-gi	4.0
9th	Han Suk-kyu	3.0	Kang Bu-ja	2.9

=== 2012 ===
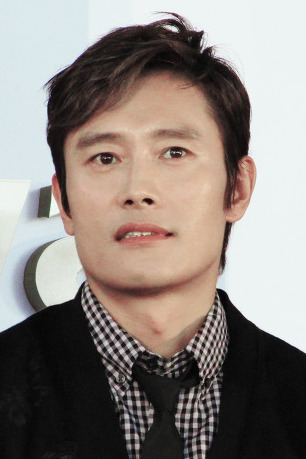
Lee Byung-hun, 2012 Fim Actor of the Year

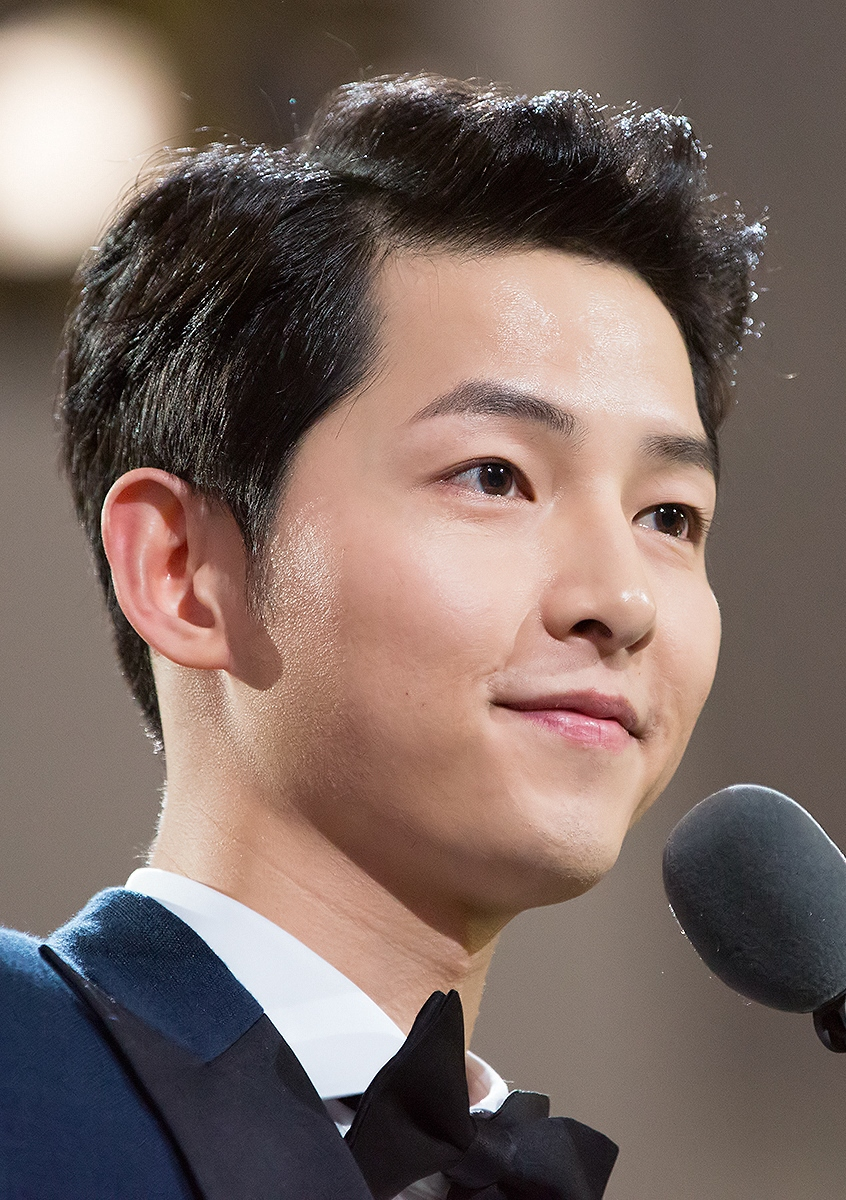
Song Joong-ki, 2012 Television Actor of the Year

Survey period: November 15–30, 2012

Rank	Film		Television	
Rank	Name	%	Name	%
1st	Lee Byung-hun	37.6	Song Joong-ki	18.2
2nd	Song Joong-ki	15.0	Kim Nam-joo	12.9
3rd	Kim Hye-soo	7.6	Yoo Jun-sang	9.5
4th	Jang Dong-gun	7.4	Kim Soo-hyun	8.2
5th	Ha Jung-woo	6.4	Jang Dong-gun	8.1
6th	Jun Ji-hyun	5.7	Lee Byung-hun	4.5
7th	Kim Yun-seok	4.5	Lee Soon-jae	3.7
8th	Park Bo-young	4.2	Moon Chae-won	3.6
9th	Ahn Sung-ki	3.4	Han Ga-in	3.1
10th	Jo Min-su	3.3	Kim Hae-sook	2.8

=== 2013 ===
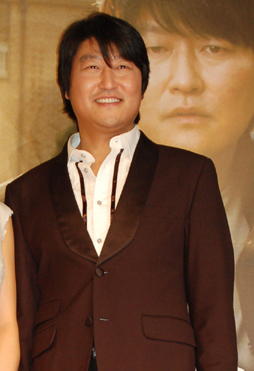
Song Kang-ho, 2013 Fim Actor of the Year

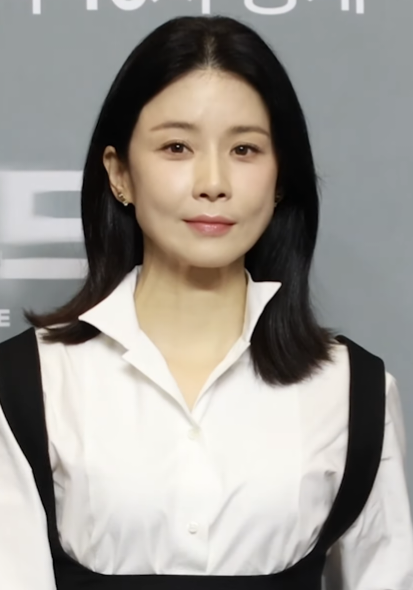
Lee Bo-young, 2013 Television Actor of the Year

Survey period: November 1–18, 2013

Rank	Film		Television	
Rank	Name	%	Name	%
1st	Song Kang-ho	22.5	Lee Bo-young	11.0
2nd	Ha Jung-woo	18.9	Ji Sung	8.1
3rd	Lee Byung-hun	18.0	So Ji-sub	7.5
4th	Ryu Seung-ryong	10.1	Joo Won	6.6
5th	Sol Kyung-gu	7.4	Lee Jong-suk	6.4
6th	Lee Jung-jae	6.7	Lee Soon-jae	5.2
7th	Kim Hye-soo	6.3	Kim Tae-hee	4.9
8th	Kim Soo-hyun	5.7	Lee Min-ho	4.6
9th	Jang Dong-gun	3.7	Hwang Jung-eum	4.5
10th	Jun Ji-hyun	2.8	Kim Soo-hyun	3.6

=== 2014 ===
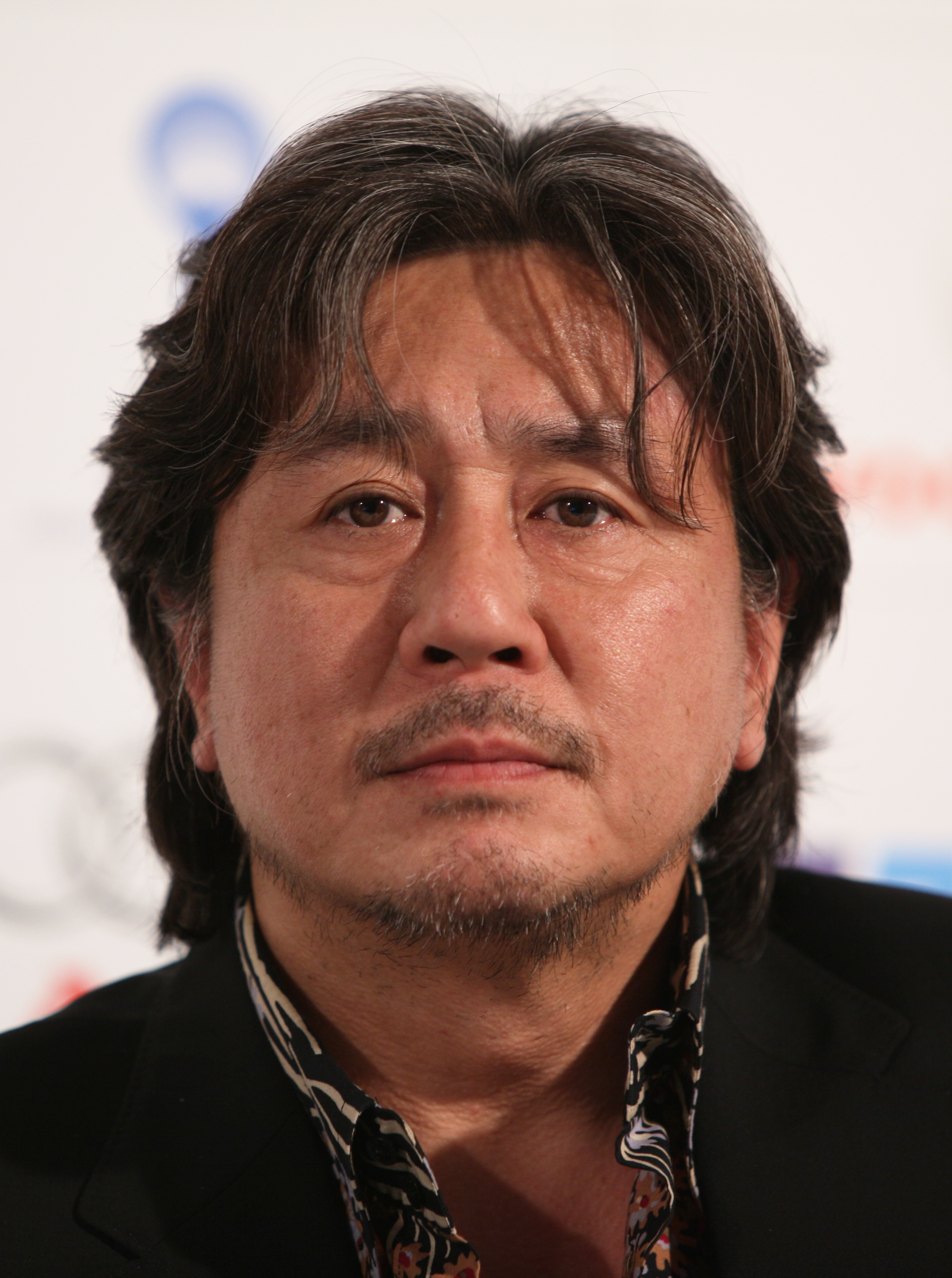
Choi Min-sik, 2014 Fim Actor of the Year

Survey period: October 29 – November 25, 2014

Rank	Film		Television	
Rank	Name	%	Name	%
1st	Choi Min-sik	42.3	Kim Soo-hyun	19.6
2nd	Song Kang-ho	22.2	Lee Yoo-ri	18.2
3rd	Ryu Seung-ryong	10.5	Jun Ji-hyun	17.6
4th	Ha Jung-woo	9.0	Song Yoon-ah	6.1
5th	Lee Byung-hun	4.5	Oh Yeon-seo	5.9
6th	Kang Dong-won	4.2	Yoo Dong-geun	5.1
7th	Sol Kyung-gu	3.7	Zo In-sung	4.6
8th	Jung Woo-sung	3.6	Go Doo-shim	3.2
9th	Hyun Bin	3.3	Kim Tae-hee	2.7
10th	Kim Soo-hyun	3.2	Kim Hee-ae	2.6

=== 2015 ===
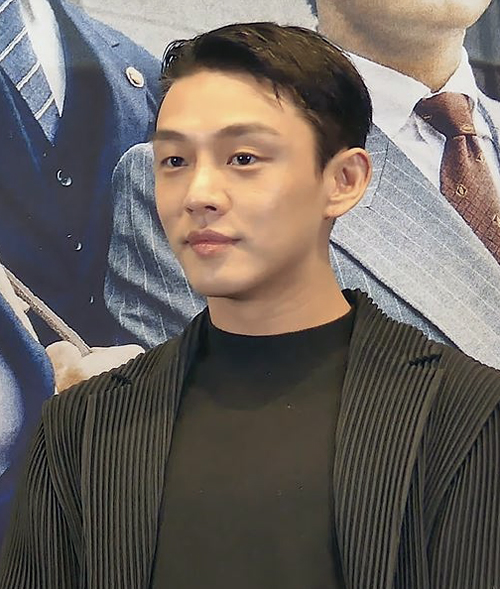
Yoo Ah-in, 2015 Fim Actor of the Year

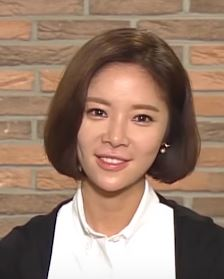
Hwang Jung-eum, 2015 Television Actor of the Year

Survey period: October 29 – November 21, 2015

Rank	Film		Television	
Rank	Name	%	Name	%
1st	Yoo Ah-in	26.9	Hwang Jung-eum	14.4
2nd	Song Kang-ho	20.3	Kim Soo-hyun	10.4
3rd	Hwang Jung-min	16.1	Jun Ji-hyun	10.4
4th	Jun Ji-hyun	14.2	Yoo Ah-in	9.4
5th	Ha Jung-woo	11.8	Park Seo-joon	7.8
6th	Choi Min-sik	9.8	Jeon In-hwa	7.6
7th	Oh Dal-su	6.2	Go Doo-shim	6.0
7th	Oh Dal-su	6.2	Kim Tae-hee	6.0
8th	Lee Jung-jae	5.8	—N/a	
9th	Kang Dong-won	4.2	Joo Won	4.8
10th	Yoo Hae-jin	4.1	Kim Hee-ae	3.4
10th	Yoo Hae-jin	4.1	Ji Sung	3.4

=== 2016 ===
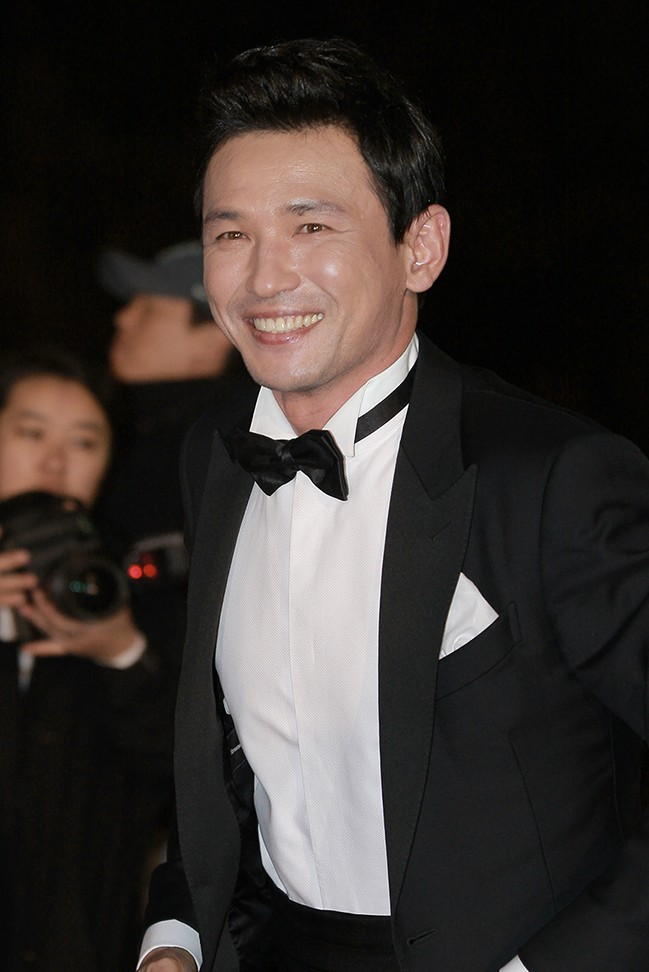
Hwang Jung-min, 2016 Fim Actor of the Year

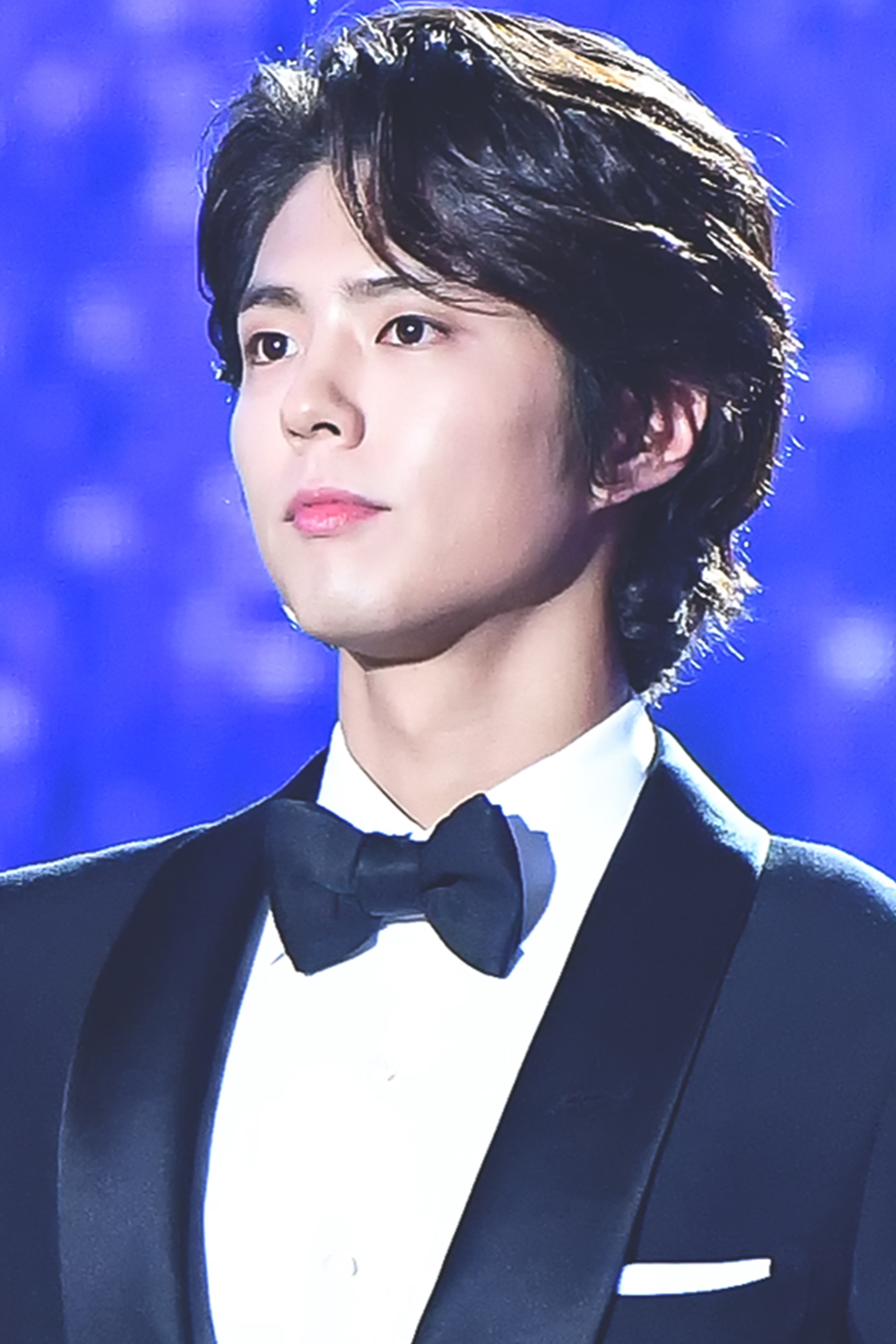
Park Bo-gum, 2016 Television Actor of the Year

Survey period: November 4–25, 2016

Rank	Film		Television	
Rank	Name	%	Name	%
1st	Hwang Jung-min	21.2	Park Bo-gum	35.2
2nd	Song Kang-ho	18.4	Song Joong-ki	28.1
3rd	Gong Yoo	12.7	Song Hye-kyo	12.6
4th	Ha Jung-woo	11.4	Kim You-jung	8.2
5th	Yoo Hae-jin	10.8	Jo Jung-suk	4.6
6th	Lee Byung-hun	9.6	Ra Mi-ran	3.4
7th	Lee Jung-jae	6.3	Gong Hyo-jin	3.2
8th	Jung Woo-sung	6.2	Go Doo-shim	3.0
9th	Jun Ji-hyun	5.4	Jun Ji-hyun	2.9
10th	Ma Dong-seok	5.0	Kim Hee-ae	2.6

=== 2017 ===
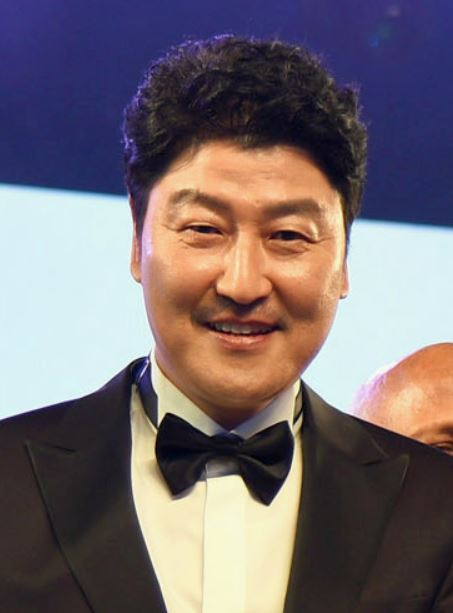
Song Kang-ho, 2017 Fim Actor of the Year

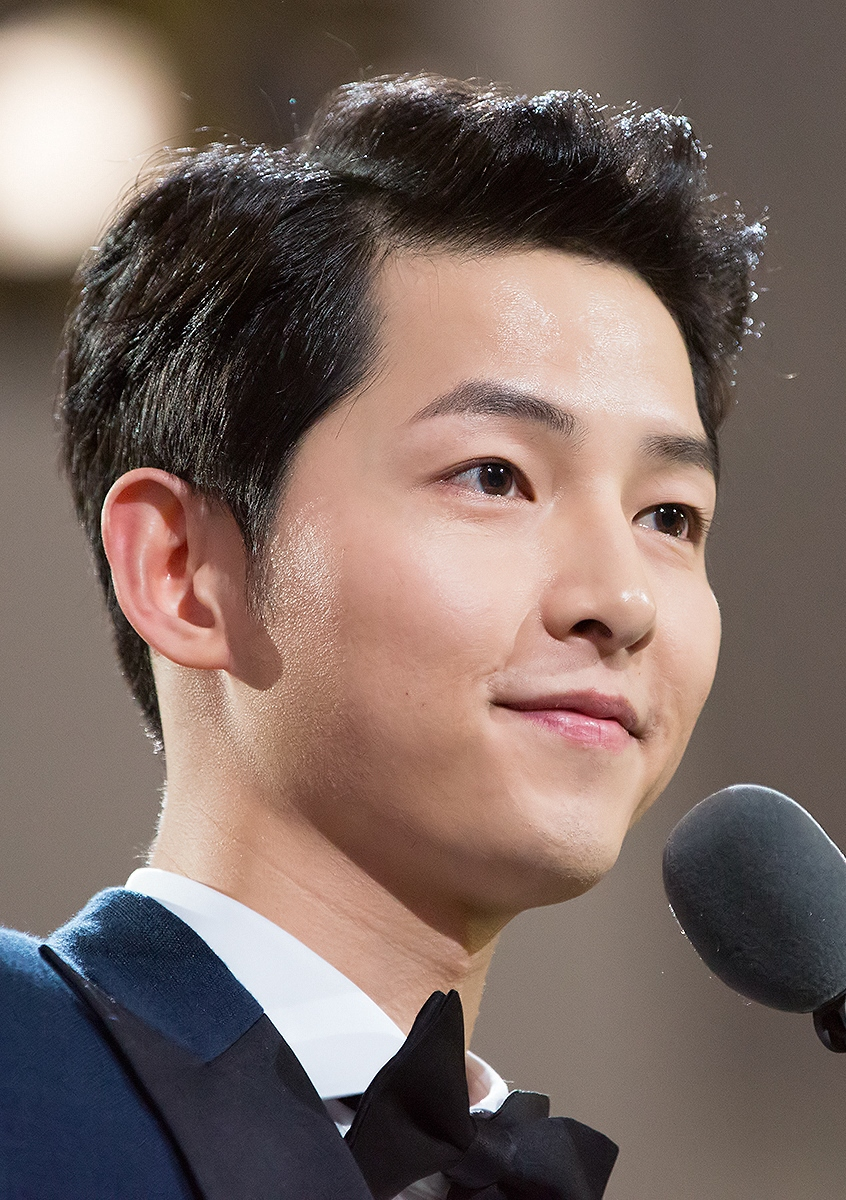
Song Joong-ki, 2017 Television Actor of the Year

Survey period: November 8–28, 2017

Rank	Film		Television	
Rank	Name	%	Name	%
1st	Song Kang-ho	35.0	Song Joong-ki	17.9
2nd	Ma Dong-seok	17.8	Gong Yoo	10.1
3rd	Lee Byung-hun	12.6	Song Hye-kyo	9.5
4th	Hwang Jung-min	8.1	Park Bo-gum	8.3
5th	Sol Kyung-gu	6.3	Lee Jong-suk	7.0
6th	Ha Jung-woo	6.3	Bae Suzy	4.3
7th	Gong Yoo	6.2	Kim Hee-sun	4.2
8th	Song Joong-ki	5.8	Kim Joo-hyuk	3.2
9th	Jung Woo-sung	5.2	Lee Soon-jae	3.2
10th	Yoo Hae-jin	5.1	Go Doo-shim	3.1
10th	Yoo Hae-jin	5.1	Kim Hae-sook	3.1

=== 2018 ===
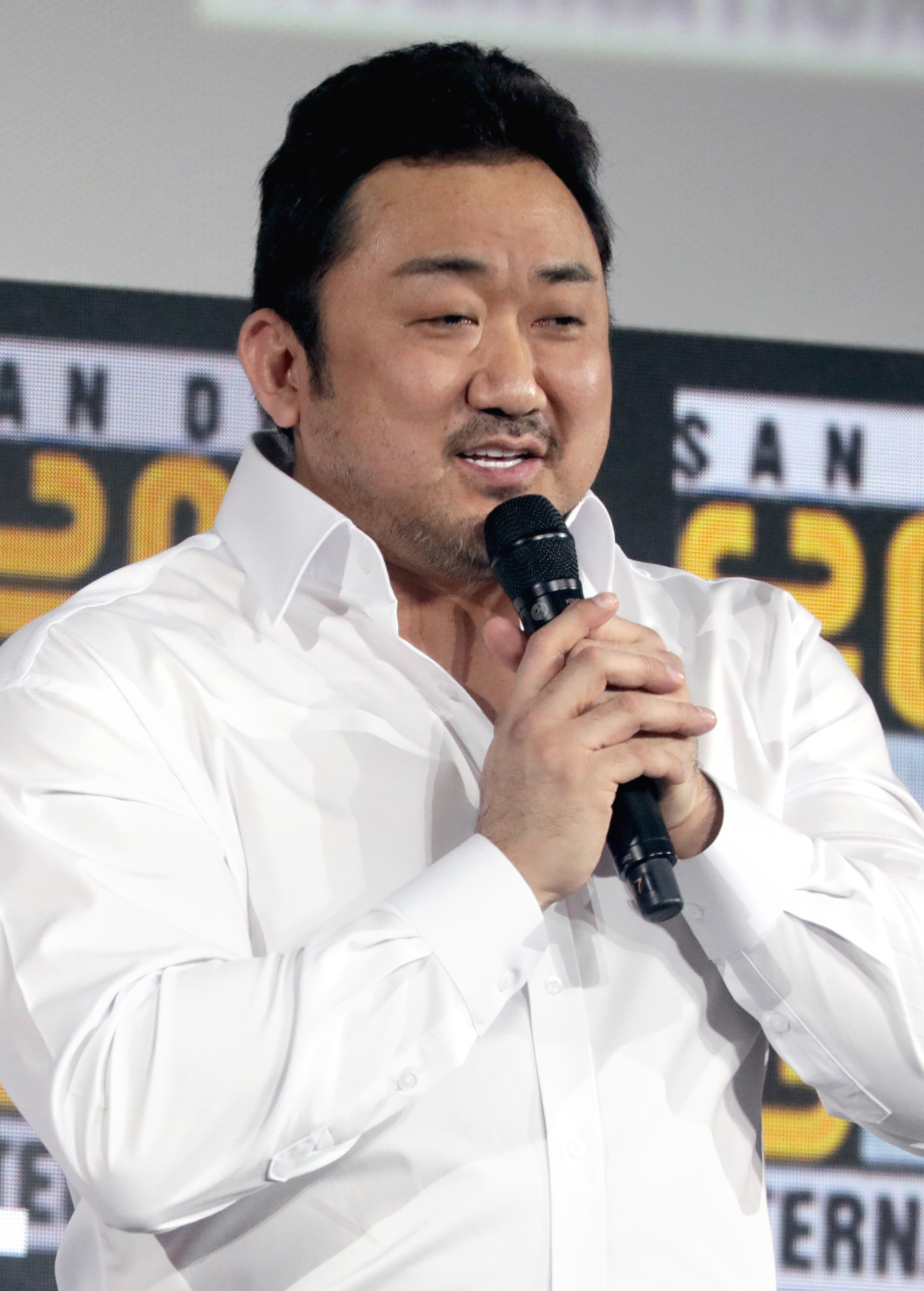
Ma Dong-seok, 2018 Fim Actor of the Year

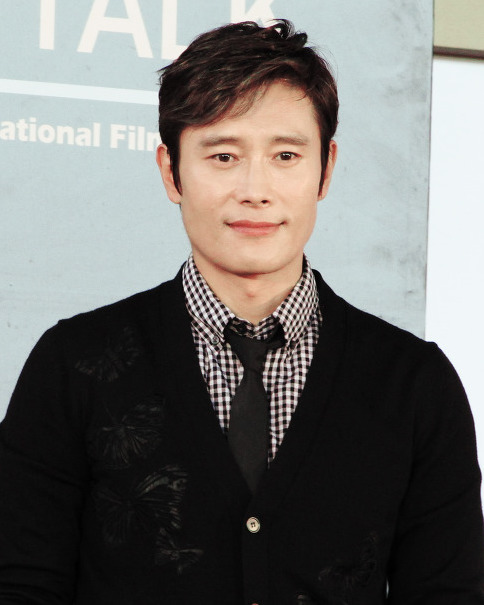
Lee Byung-hun, 2018 Television Actor of the Year

Survey period: November 7–30, 2018

Rank	Film		Television	
Rank	Name	%	Name	%
1st	Ma Dong-seok	19.9	Lee Byung-hun	12.9
2nd	Ha Jung-woo	18.6	Kim Tae-ri	9.0
3rd	Lee Byung-hun	11.2	Jung Hae-in	8.7
4th	Song Kang-ho	10.9	Park Bo-gum	6.1
5th	Ju Ji-hoon	7.3	Son Ye-jin	5.3
6th	Yoo Hae-jin	6.4	Jang Mi-hee	5.0
7th	Jung Woo-sung	6.2	Seo Hyun-jin	4.5
8th	Hwang Jung-min	4.9	Choi Soo-jong	4.3
9th	Zo In-sung	4.6	Yoo Dong-geun	3.9
10th	Cha Tae-hyun	4.1	Gong Yoo	3.7

=== 2019 ===
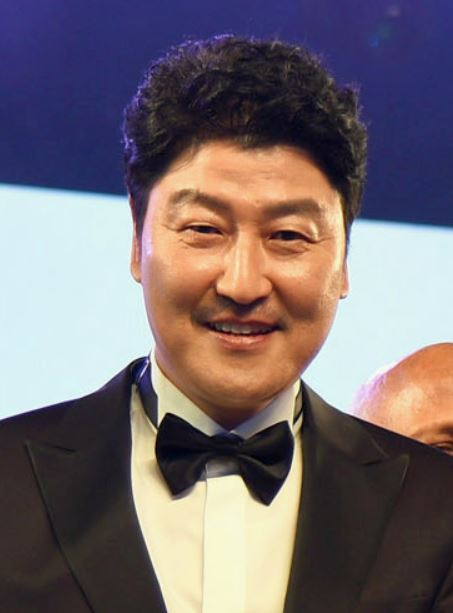
Song Kang-ho, 2019 Fim Actor of the Year

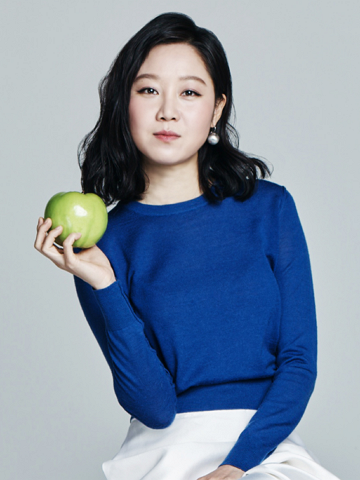
Gong Hyo-jin, 2019 Television Actor of the Year

Survey period: November 8–28, 2019

Rank	Film		Television	
Rank	Name	%	Name	%
1st	Song Kang-ho	29.8	Gong Hyo-jin	12.4
2nd	Ma Dong-seok	18.2	Kang Ha-neul	12.0
3rd	Gong Yoo	8.9	Go Doo-shim	7.0
4th	Cho Jin-woong	8.5	Park Bo-gum	5.0
5th	Lee Byung-hun	7.1	Gong Yoo	4.7
5th	Lee Byung-hun	7.1	Jung Hae-in	4.7
6th	Ha Jung-woo	7.1	—N/a	
7th	Jung Woo-sung	4.5	IU	4.2
8th	Yoo Hae-jin	4.1	Yum Jung-ah	3.9
9th	Hwang Jung-min	3.6	Kim Soo-mi	3.2
10th	Lee Ha-nui	3.3	Lee Seung-gi	3.0
10th	Lee Ha-nui	3.3	Choi Bool-am	3.0

Note: Song Kang-ho took first place across all age groups and generations.

=== 2020 ===
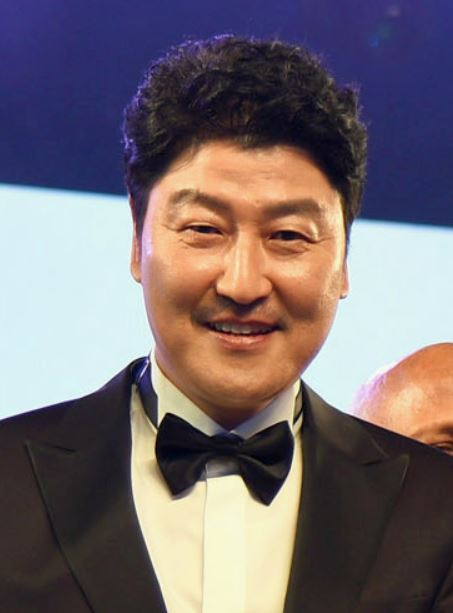
Song Kang-ho, 2020 Fim Actor of the Year

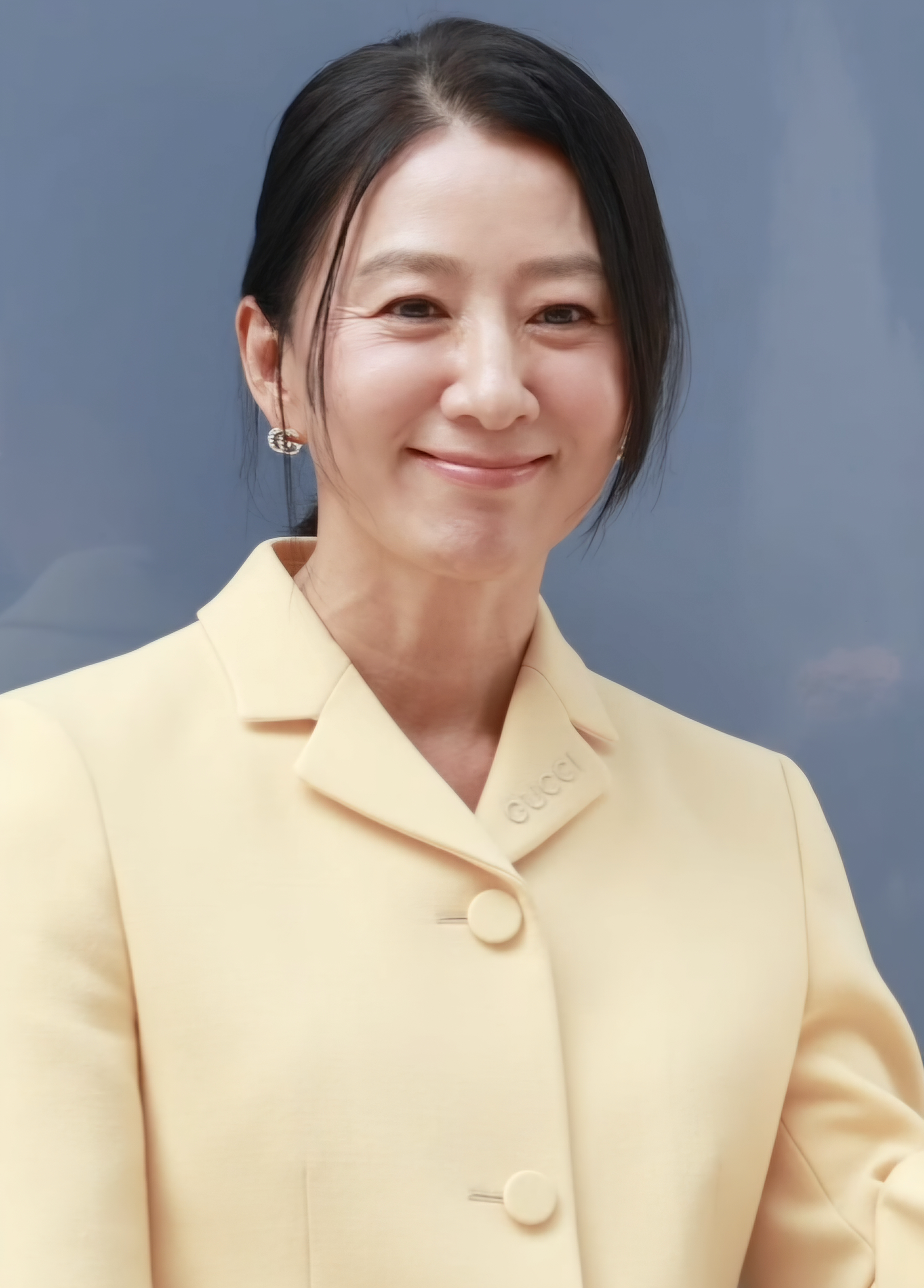
Kim Hee-ae, 2020 Television Actor of the Year

Survey period: November 5–29, 2020

Rank	Film		Television	
Rank	Name	%	Name	%
1st	Song Kang-ho	27.8	Kim Hee-ae	9.4
2nd	Lee Byung-hun	14.0	Park Bo-gum	7.6
3rd	Ma Dong-seok	9.1	Hyun Bin	6.5
4th	Hwang Jung-min	7.5	Park Seo-joon	5.9
5th	Jung Woo-sung	6.2	Son Ye-jin	4.6
6th	Gong Yoo	5.9	Bae Suzy	4.3
7th	Ha Jung-woo	4.0	Jeon In-hwa	4.1
8th	Lee Jung-jae	3.6	Gong Yoo	3.2
9th	Kim Hye-soo	3.5	Cha Hwa-yeon	3.2
10th	Lee Jung-eun	3.4	Gong Hyo-jin	3.0

Note: Song Kang-ho took first place across all age groups for the second consecutive year.

=== 2021 ===
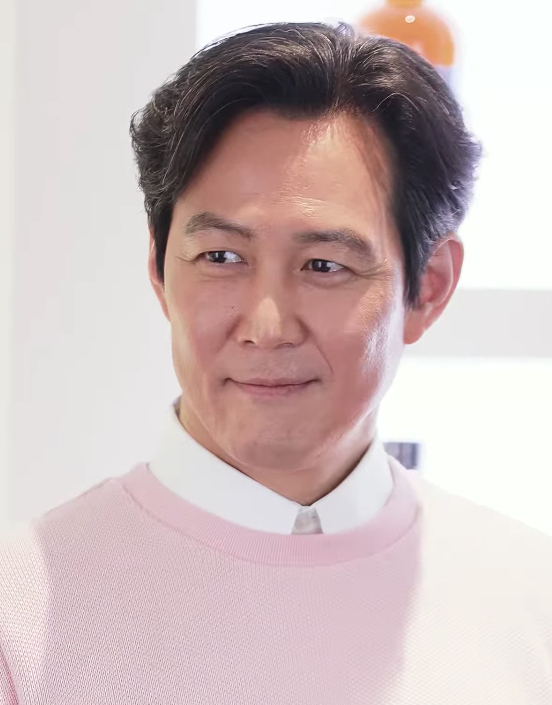
Lee Jung-jae, 2021 Fim Actor of the Year

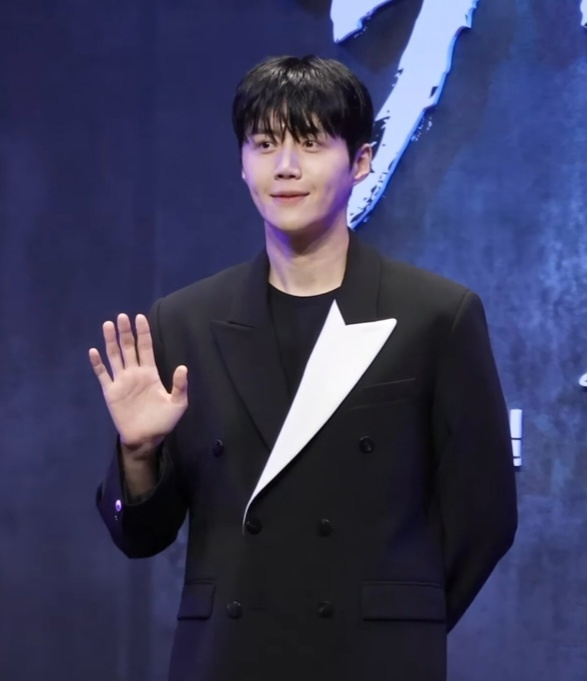
Kim Seon-ho, 2021 Television Actor of the Year

Survey period: November 5–28, 2021

Rank	Film		Television	
Rank	Name	%	Name	%
1st	Lee Jung-jae	39.7	Kim Seon-ho	7.8
2nd	Youn Yuh-jung	18.9	Shin Min-a	7.3
2nd	Youn Yuh-jung	18.9	Lee Jung-jae	7.3
3rd	Ma Dong-seok	11.4	—N/a	
4th	Song Kang-ho	8.8	Jun Ji-hyun	5.5
5th	Lee Byung-hun	7.0	Song Hye-kyo	5.2
6th	Hwang Jung-min	5.6	Kim So-yeon	5.0
7th	Gong Yoo	3.6	Lee Ha-nui	4.9
7th	Gong Yoo	3.6	Jo Jung-suk	4.9
8th	Jung Woo-sung	3.5	—N/a	
9th	Kim Hye-soo	2.6	Namgoong Min	4.5
10th	Zo In-sung	2.5	Song Joong-ki	4.1
10th	Zo In-sung	2.5	Youn Yuh-jung	4.1

=== 2022 ===
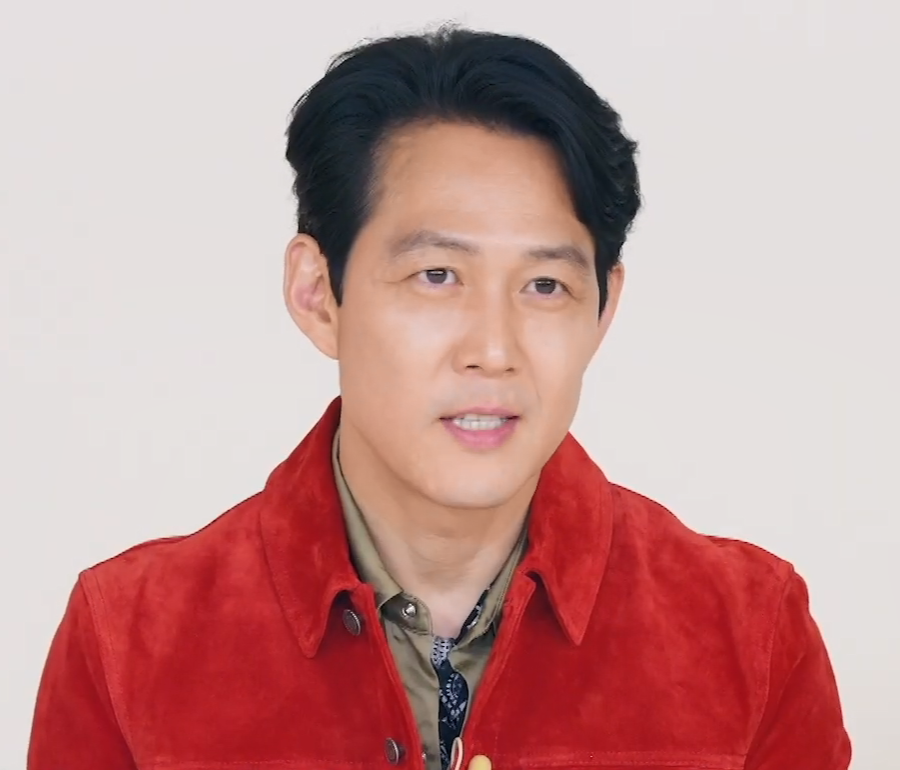
Lee Jung-jae, 2022 Fim Actor of the Year

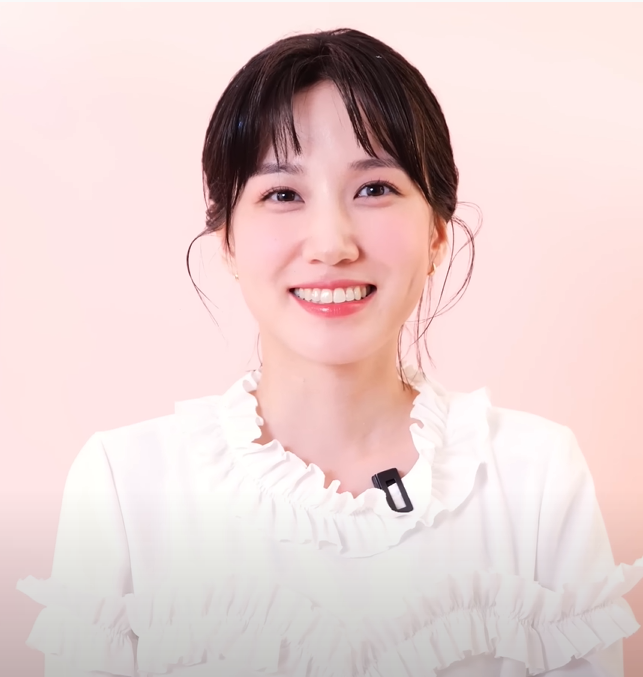
Park Eun-bin, 2022 Television Actor of the Year

Survey period: November 7–24, 2022

Rank	Film		Television	
Rank	Name	%	Name	%
1st	Lee Jung-jae	34.4	Park Eun-bin	13.6
2nd	Ma Dong-seok	18.8	Kim Hye-soo	13.0
3rd	Song Kang-ho	13.5	Namgoong Min	11.3
4th	Youn Yuh-jung	7.7	Go Doo-shim	4.2
5th	Hwang Jung-min	6.5	Song Joong-ki	3.3
5th	Jung Woo-sung	6.5	Song Joong-ki	3.3
6th	—N/a		Lee Jung-jae	2.9
7th	Lee Byung-hun	6.0	Hyun Bin	2.6
8th	Hyun Bin	5.5	Lee Byung-hun	2.5
9th	Yoo Hae-jin	5.2	Son Suk-ku	2.4
9th	Yoo Hae-jin	5.2	Kim Go-eun	2.4
10th	Son Suk-ku	5.0	—N/a	

=== 2023 ===
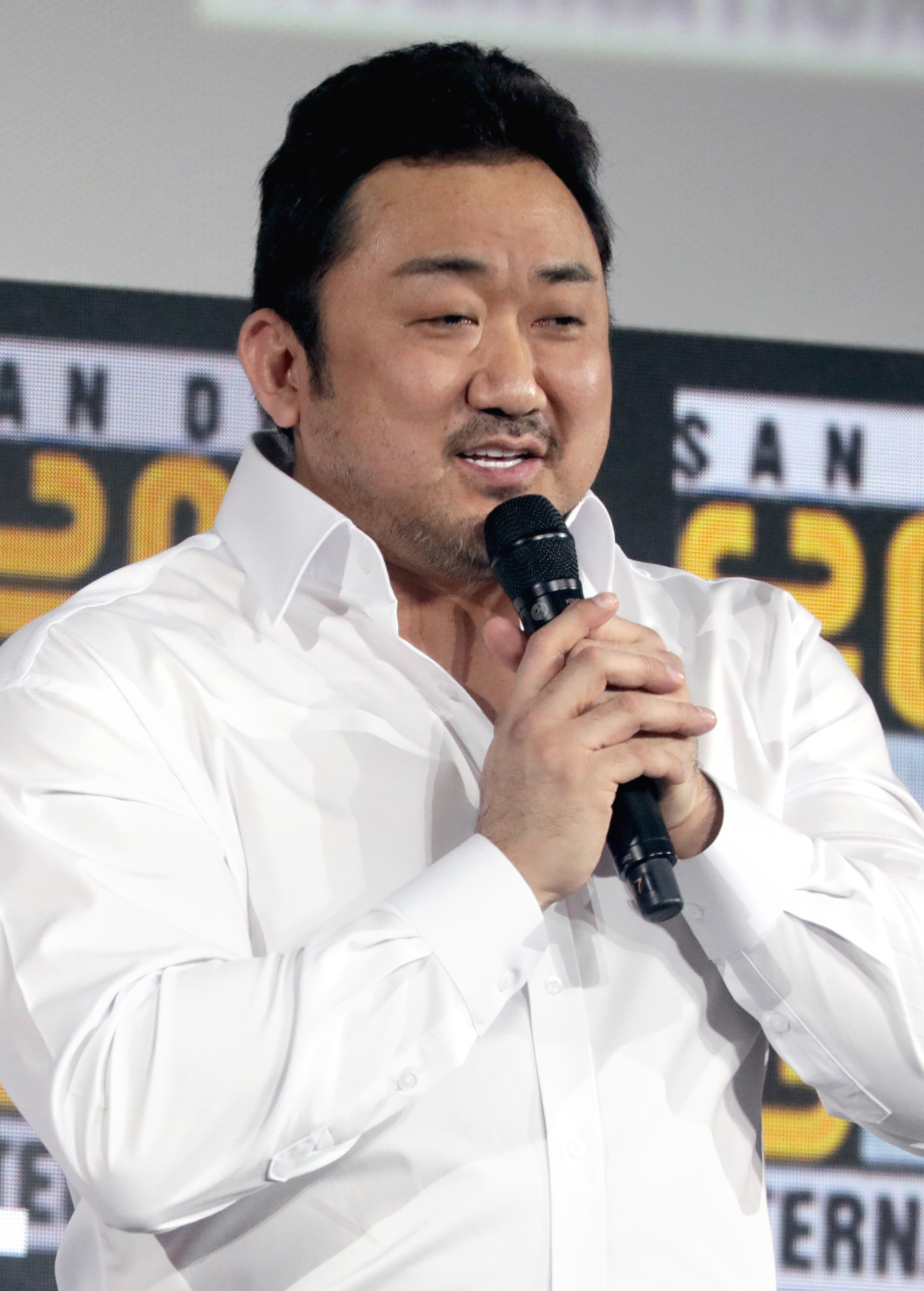
Ma Dong-seok, 2023 Fim Actor of the Year

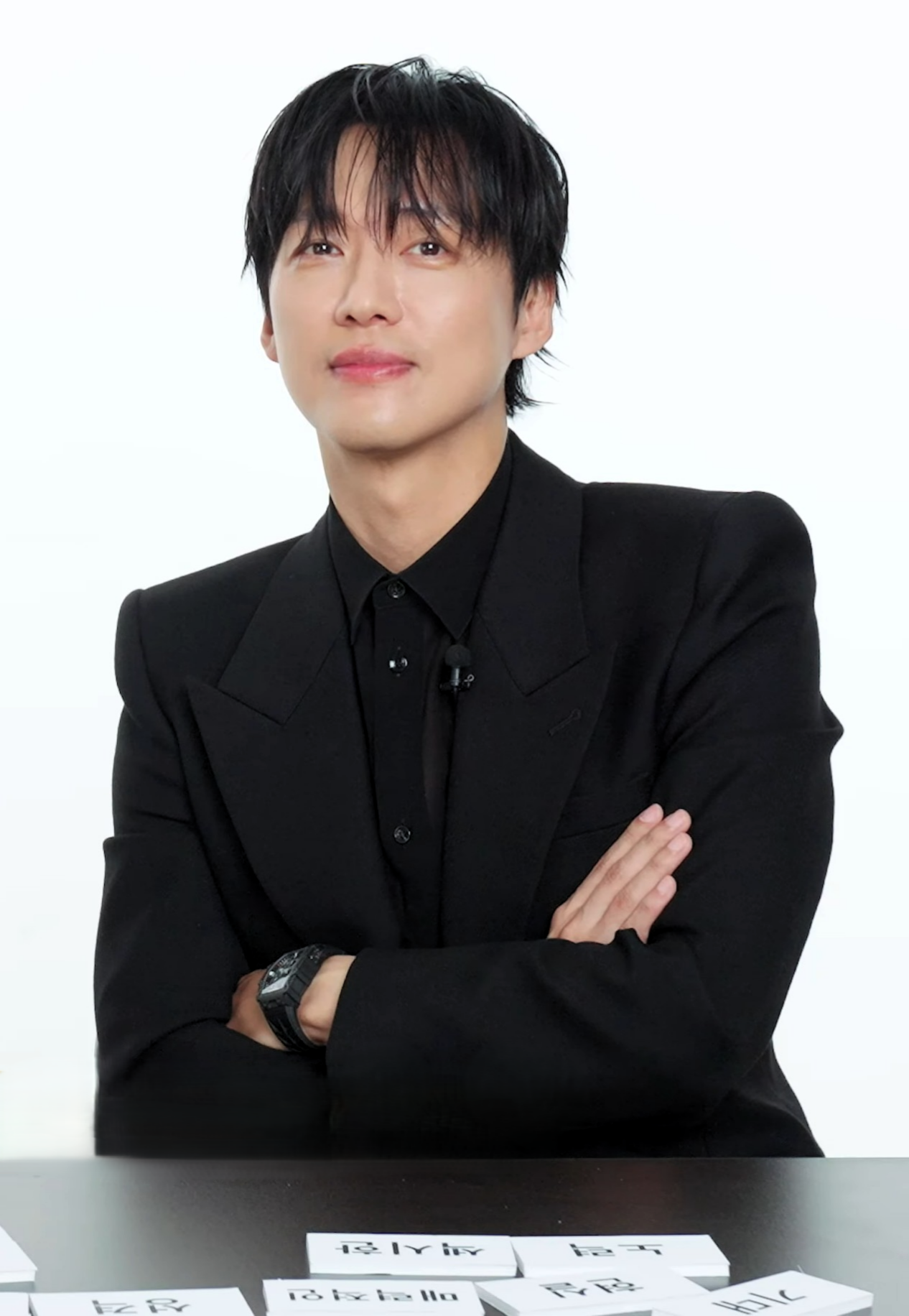
Namkoong Min, 2023 Television Actor of the Year

Survey period: November 2 – December 4, 2023

Rank	Film		Television	
Rank	Name	%	Name	%
1st	Ma Dong-seok	18.0	Namgoong Min	20.2
2nd	Lee Byung-hun	14.6	Park Eun-bin	6.4
3rd	Song Kang-ho	11.1	Song Hye-kyo	6.3
4th	Hwang Jung-min	10.1	Ahn Eun-jin	5.6
4th	Lee Jung-jae	10.1	Ahn Eun-jin	5.6
5th	—N/a		Song Joong-ki	3.2
6th	Kim Hye-soo	7.2	Choi Soo-jong	3.0
7th	Jung Woo-sung	6.6	Kim Hae-sook	2.4
8th	Zo In-sung	4.9	Han Suk-kyu	2.2
8th	Zo In-sung	4.9	Go Doo-shim	2.2
8th	Zo In-sung	4.9	Kim Hye-soo	2.2
9th	Son Suk-ku	3.6	—N/a	
10th	Yoo Hae-jin	2.9	—N/a	
10th	Ha Jung-woo	2.9	—N/a	

Demographics: Namgoong Min took first place in all age groups.

=== 2024 ===
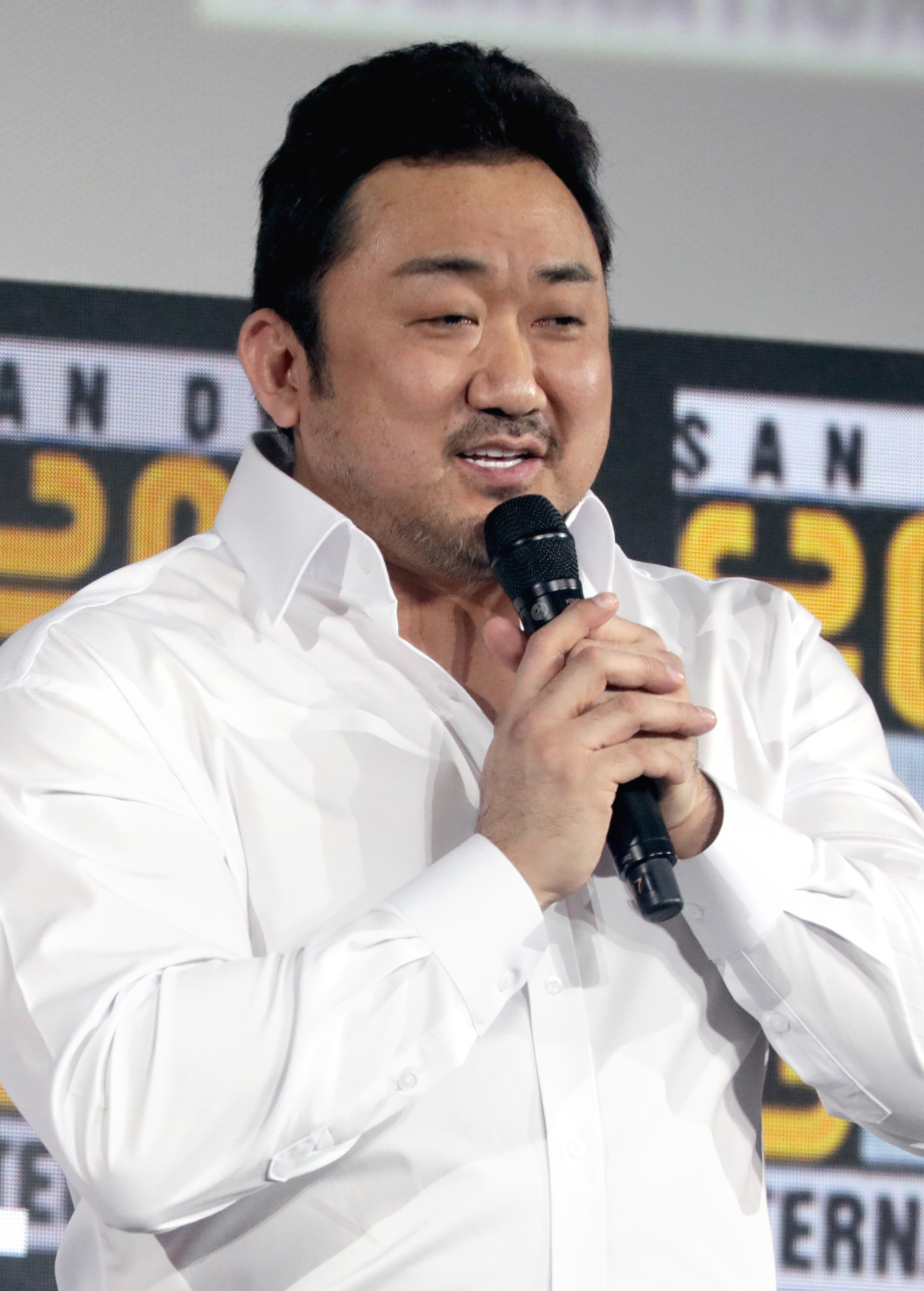
Ma Dong-seok, 2024 Fim Actor of the Year

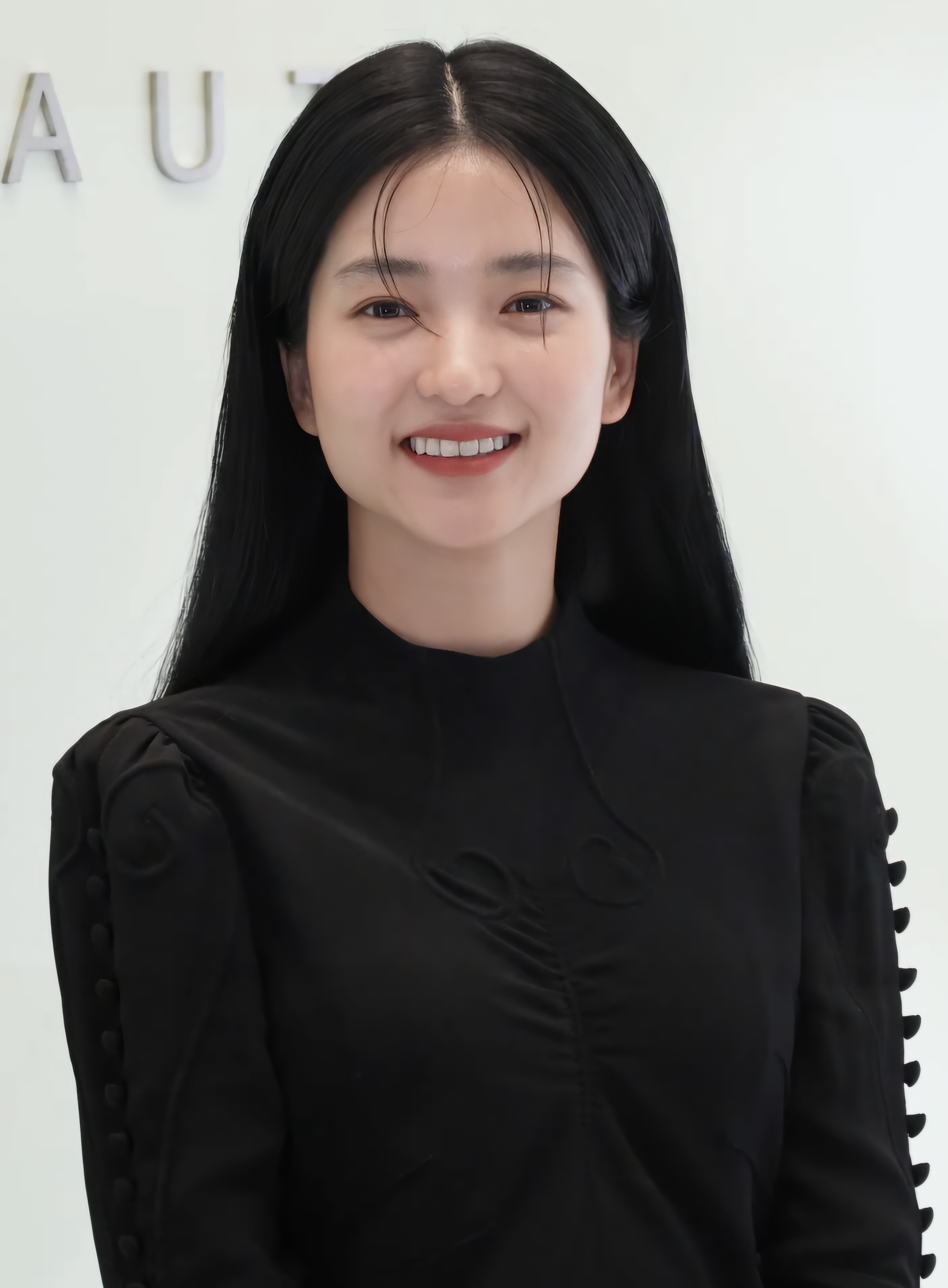
Kim Tae-ri, 2024 Television Actor of the Year

Survey period: November 11–25, 2024

Rank	Film		Television	
Rank	Name	%	Name	%
1st	Ma Dong-seok	26.5	Kim Tae-ri	11.9
2nd	Hwang Jung-min	14.2	Kim Soo-hyun	11.7
3rd	Kim Go-eun	12.2	Kim Ji-won	8.9
4th	Choi Min-sik	17.7	Byeon Woo-seok	5.5
5th	Lee Jung-jae	10.0	Namgoong Min	4.9
6th	Lee Byung-hun	8.3	Han Suk-kyu	4.0
7th	Song Kang-ho	7.3	Park Shin-hye	3.7
8th	Jung Woo-sung	5.3	Cha Eun-woo	3.5
8th	Jung Woo-sung	5.3	Kim Soo-mi	3.5
9th	Yoo Hae-jin	5.0	—N/a	
10th	Son Suk-ku	3.4	Jang Na-ra	3.4

=== 2025 ===
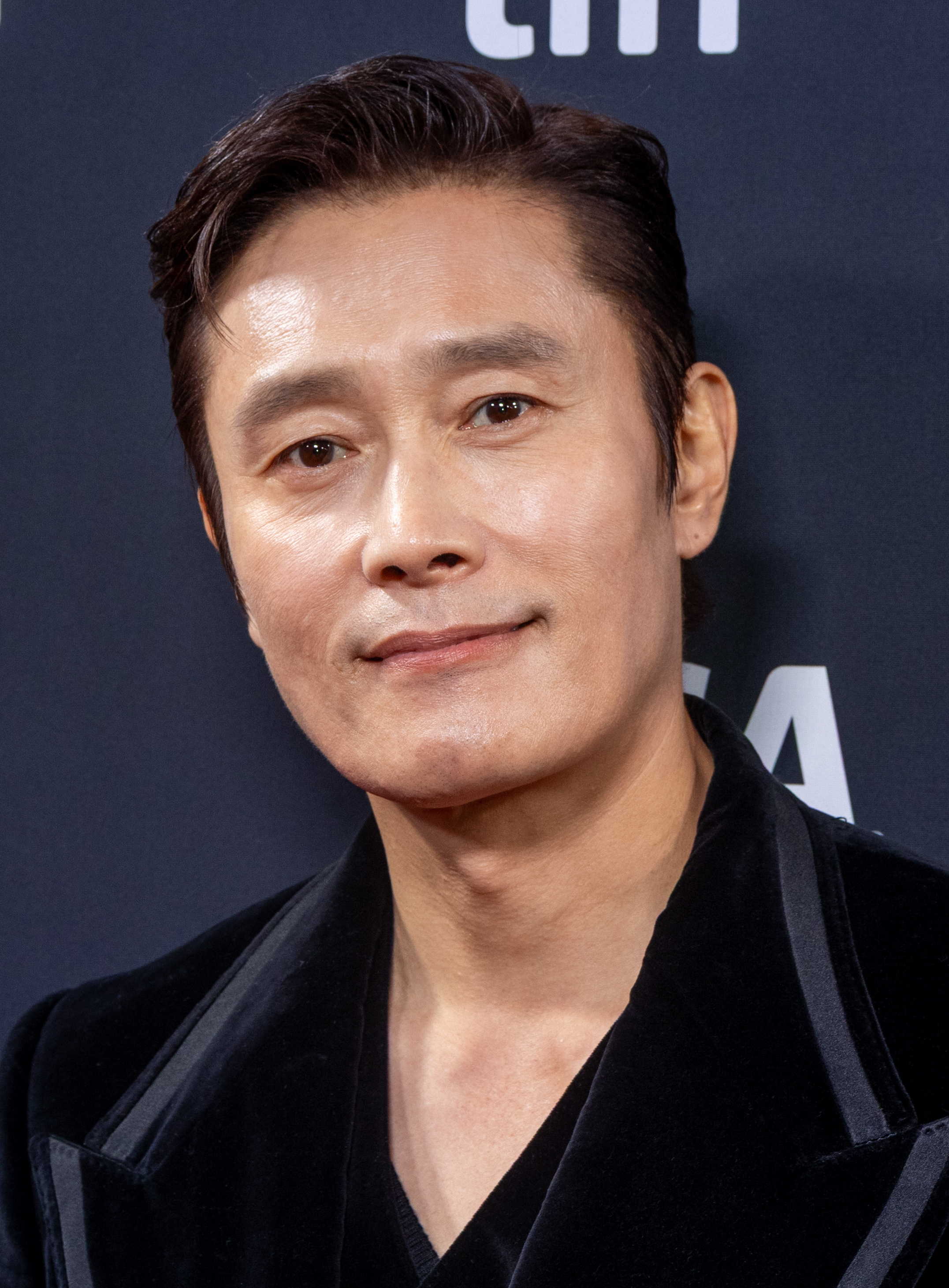
Lee Byung-hun, 2025 Fim Actor of the Year

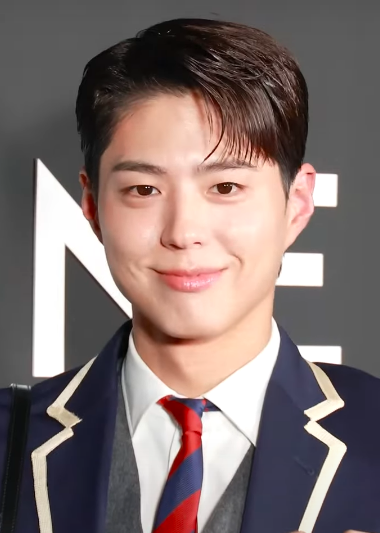
Park Bo-gum, 2025 Television Actor of the Year

Survey period: November 11–28, 2025

Rank	Film		Television	
Rank	Name	%	Name	%
1st	Lee Byung-hun	25.8	Park Bo-gum	13.3
2nd	Ma Dong-seok	18.4	IU	11.3
3rd	Lee Jung-jae	15.5	Kim Ji-won	4.4
4th	Hwang Jung-min	7.1	Im Yoon-ah	3.9
5th	Hyun Bin	6.4	Choo Young-woo	3.3
6th	Jo Jung-suk	5.5	Lee Jung-jae	3.1
7th	Song Kang-ho	5.1	Namkoong Min	2.9
7th	Song Kang-ho	5.1	Han Ji-min	2.9
7th	Song Kang-ho	5.1	Byeon Woo-seok	2.9
7th	Song Kang-ho	5.1	Kim Tae-ri	2.9
8th	Kim Go-eun	4.9	—N/a	
8th	Son Ye-jin	4.9	—N/a	
10th	Choi Min-sik	4.6	—N/a	

== See also ==
- Gallup Korea's Favorite Actor
- Gallup Korea's Singer of the Year
- Gallup Korea's Song of the Year
