= Gallup Korea's Song of the Year =

Gallup Korea's Song of the Year (Korean: 한국갤럽 올해를 빛낸 노래 1위) is selected annually through multiple public surveys conducted across South Korea by Gallup Korea. From 2020, survey is conducted in two categories on the basis of respondents' age group: 13–39, and 40 and above.

== List of recipients ==
=== 2000s ===
Year	Song	Artist	Vote %	Ref.
2007	"Tell Me"	Wonder Girls	33.9%	
2008	"Nobody"	Wonder Girls	11.4%	
2009	"Gee"	Girls' Generation	15.0%	

=== 2010s ===
Year	Song	Artist	Vote %	Ref.
2010	"Hoot"	Girls' Generation	7.2%	
2011	"Good Day"	IU	3.9%	
2012	"Gangnam Style"	Psy	30.7%	
2013	"Bounce"	Cho Yong-pil	13.6%	
2014	"The Meaning of You"	IU	7.7%	
2015	"Bang Bang Bang"	Big Bang	7.2%	
2016	"The Love I Committed"	Im Chang-jung	7.0%	
2017	"Like It"	Yoon Jong-shin	8.8%	
2018	"Ddu-Du Ddu-Du"	Blackpink	5.0%	
2019	"Boy with Luv"	BTS	5.9%	

=== 2020s ===
Key
‡	Indicates category selected by respondents in age group: 13–39
†	Indicates category selected by respondents in age group: 40 and above

Year	Song	Singer(s)	Vote %	Ref.
2020	‡ "Dynamite"	BTS	19.6%	
2020	† "Drink Makgeolli"	Young Tak	12.8%	
2021	‡ "Butter"	BTS	26.6%	
2021	† "Trust in Me"	Lim Young-woong	8.7%	
2022	‡ "Dynamite"	BTS	8.5%	
2022	† "Love Always Runs Away"	Lim Young-woong	6.9%	
2023	‡ "Super Shy"	NewJeans	6.8%	
2023	† "Love Always Runs Away"	Lim Young-woong	6.9%	
2024	‡ "Apt."	Rosé and Bruno Mars	9.8%	
2024	† "Love Always Runs Away"	Lim Young-woong	5.9%	
2025	‡ "Jump"	Blackpink	10.7%	
2025	† "I am a Firefly"	Hwang Ga-ram	6.7%	

== Artists with multiple songs selected ==
Gallery of singers indicated with year in which their song was selected as Song of the Year.

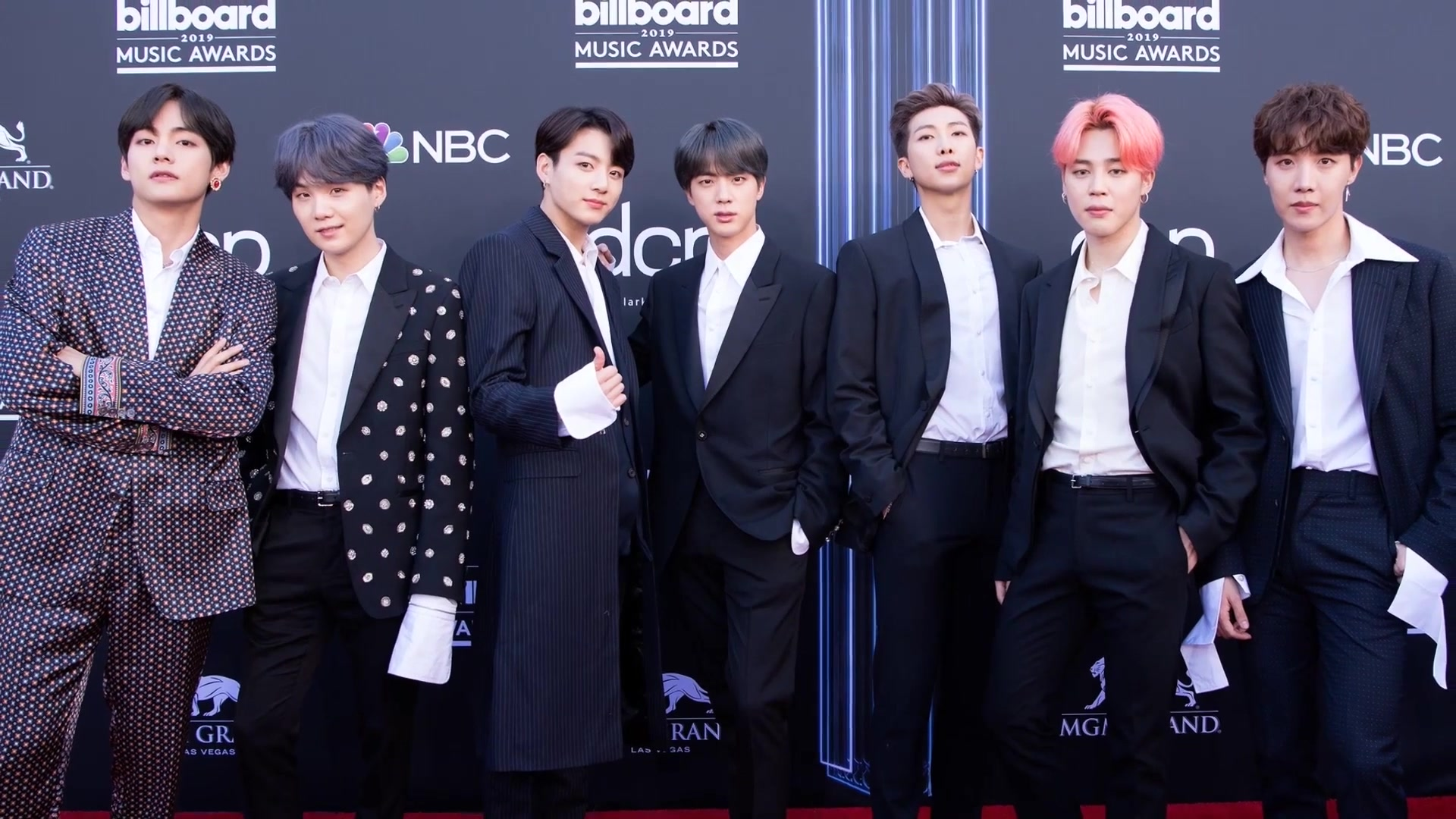
BTS (2019, 2020, 2021, and 2022)

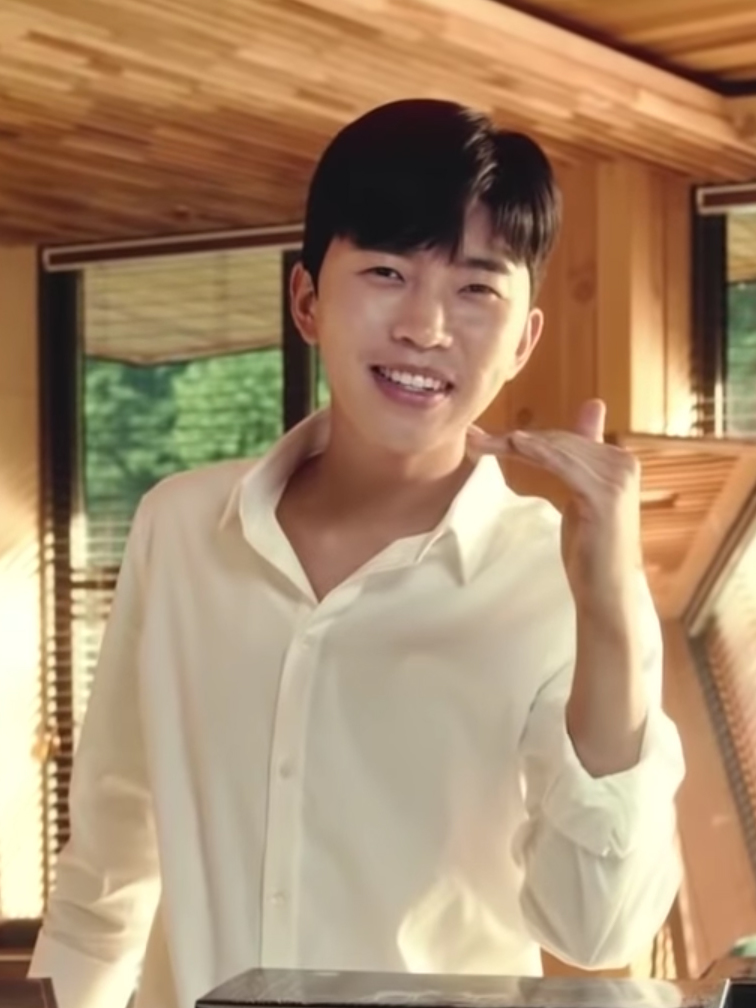
Lim Young-woong (2021, 2022, 2023, and 2024)

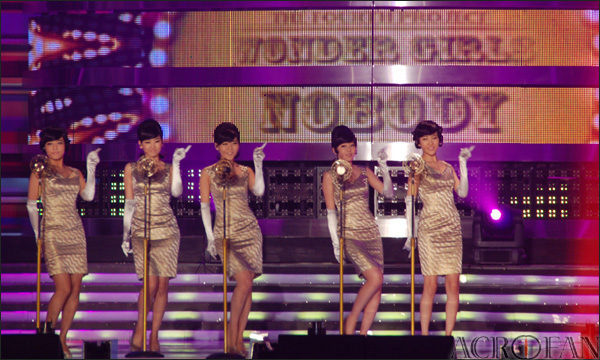
Wonder Girls (2007 and 2008)

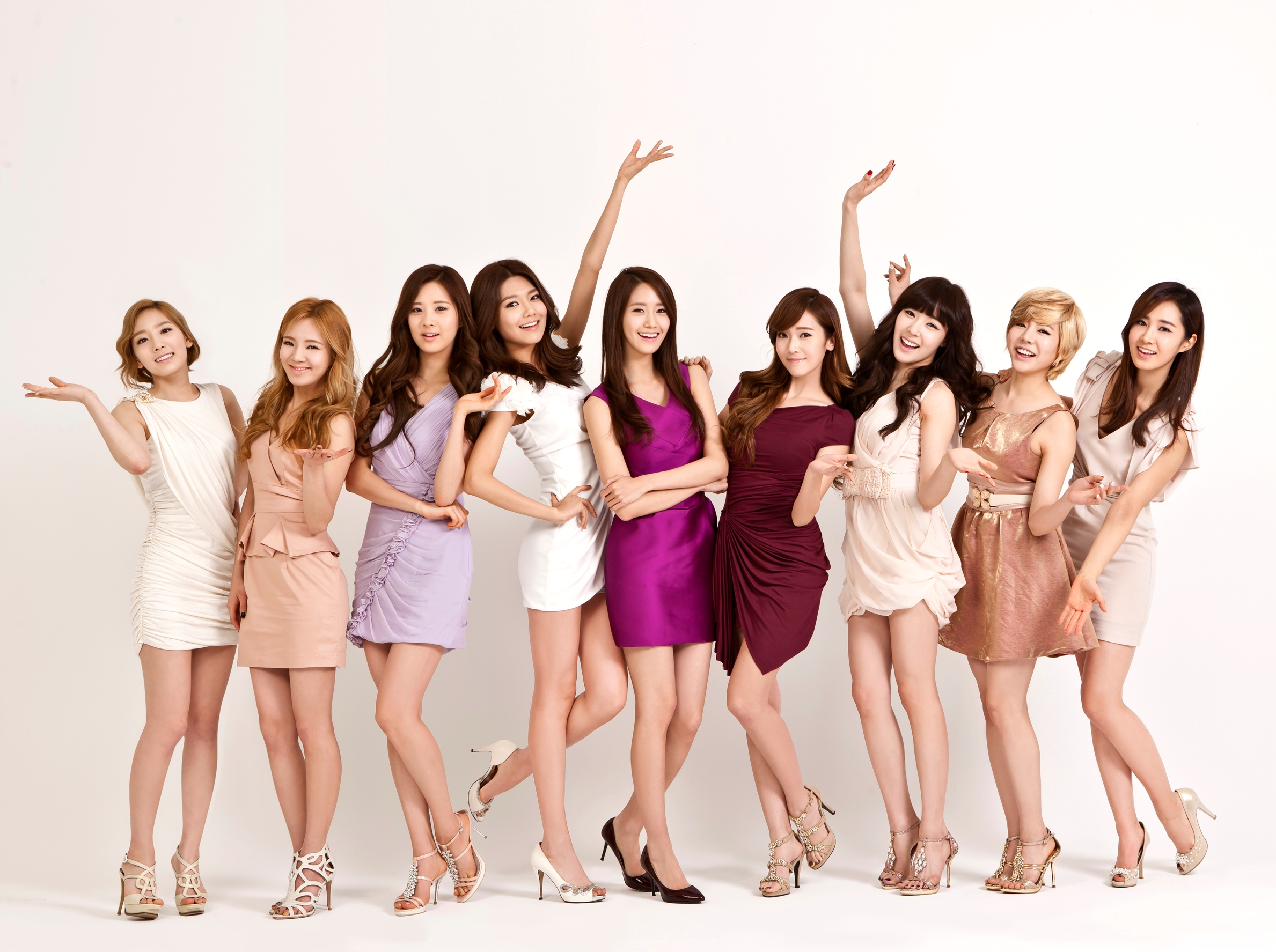
Girls' Generation (2009 and 2010)

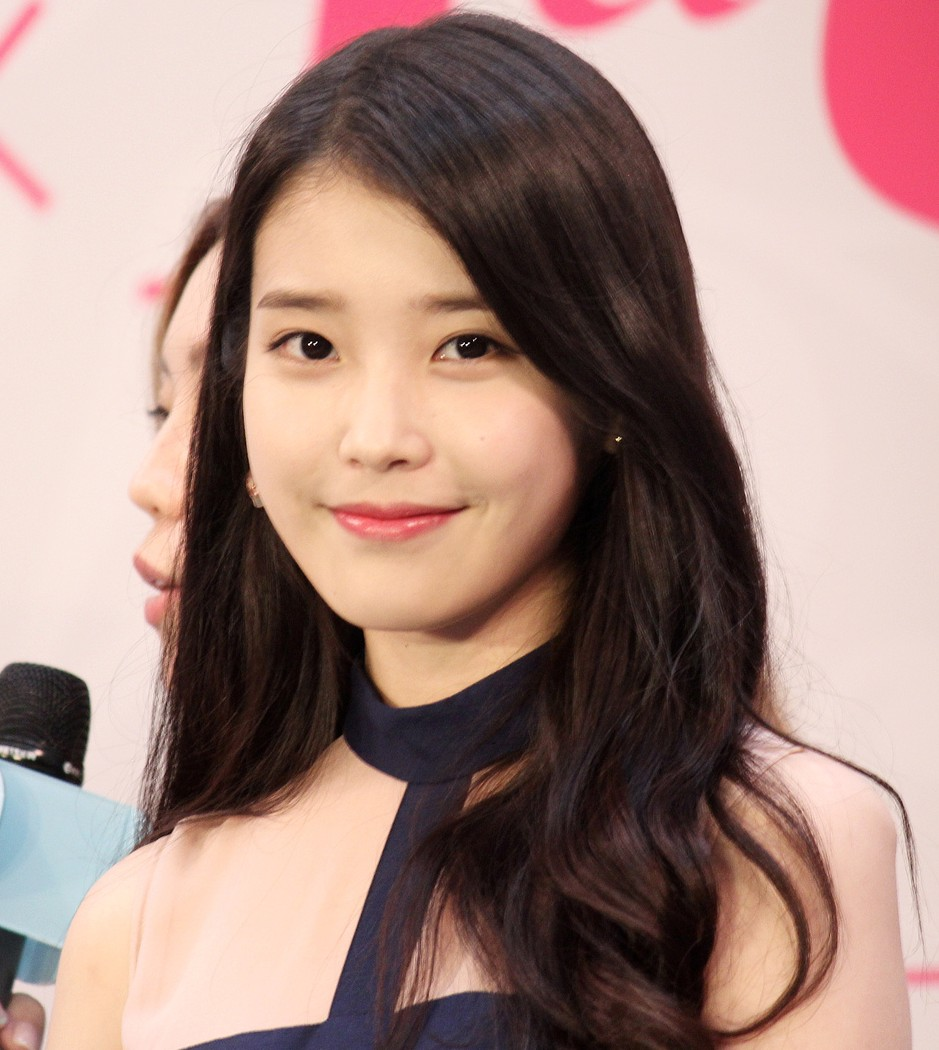
IU (2011 and 2014)

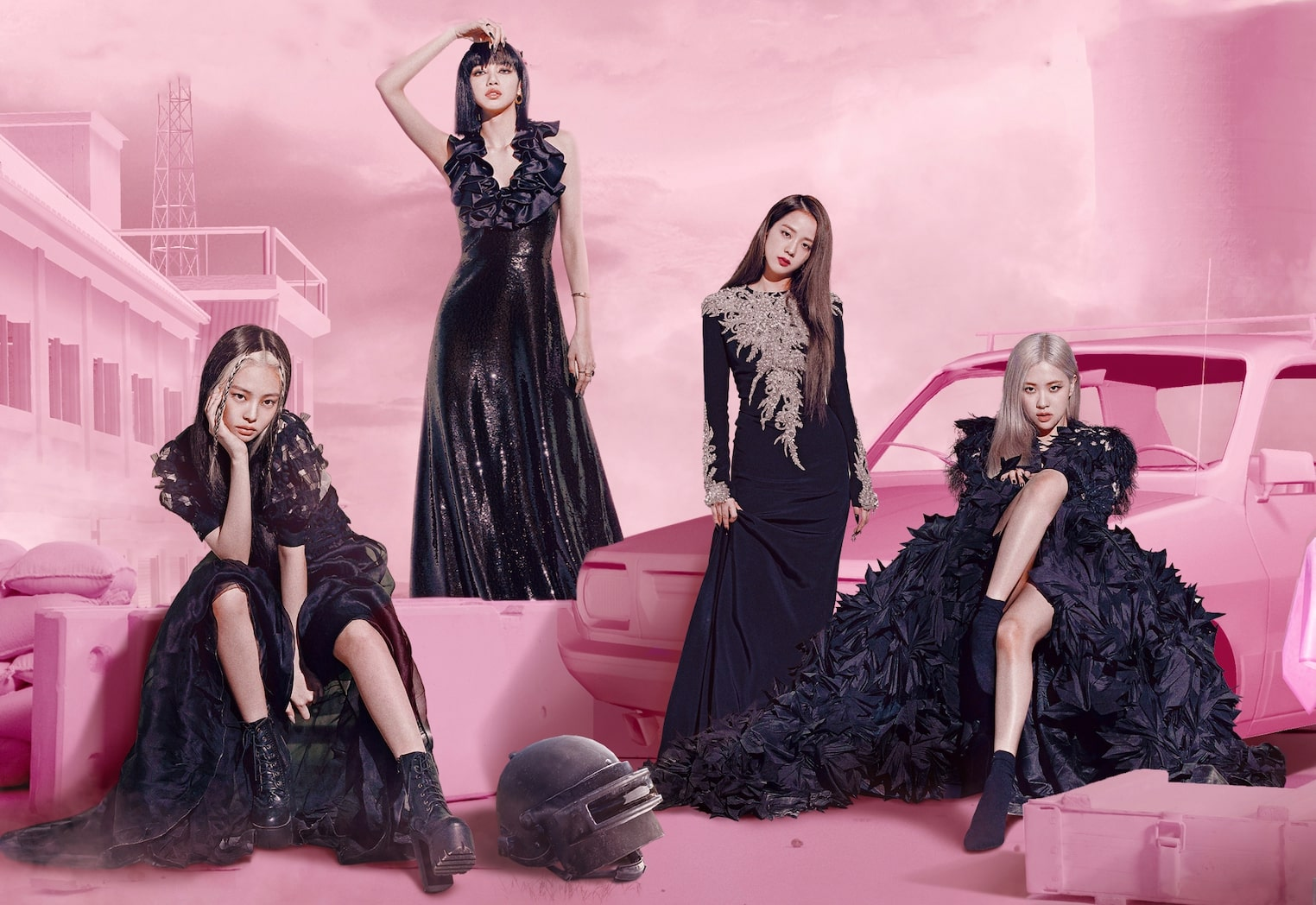
Blackpink (2018 and 2025)

== See also ==
- Gallup Korea's Actor of the Year
- Gallup Korea's Singer of the Year
