= MBLAQ discography =

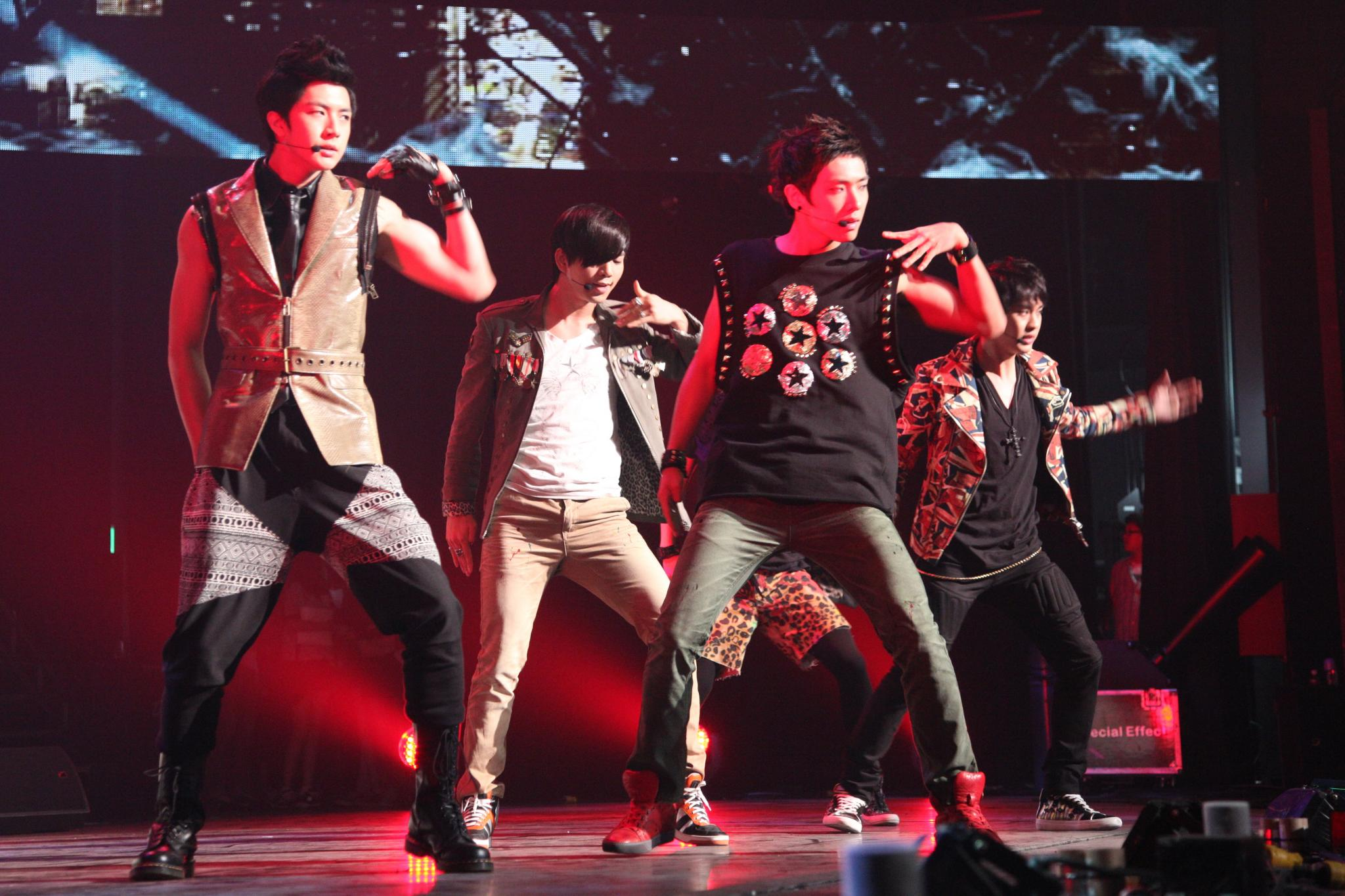
- MBLAQ performing at the Cyworld Dream Music Festival, July 23, 2011
- Studio albums: 1
- Extended plays: 8
- Soundtrack albums: 11
- Compilation albums: 2
- Singles: 21
- Video albums: 4
- Music videos: 16

The following is the discography of the South Korean dance-pop boy group MBLAQ which consists of one studio album, eight extended plays (EPs), two compilation albums, and twenty-one singles. MBLAQ have been in the music business ever since making their live debut on Mnet's M Countdown with their debut track, "Oh Yeah" on October 14, 2009.

== Albums ==
=== Studio albums ===
Title	Album details	Peak chart positions			Sales
Title	Album details	KOR	TWN (Note: The G-Music chart was established in July 2005 and only archives the top 20 releases.)	TWN East Asian (Note: Position was taken from 2011 week 12 for Blaq Style.)	Sales
BLAQ Style	Released: January 10, 2011; Re-released (3D Edition): February 22, 2011; Label: J. Tune Camp; Format: CD, digital download	2	12	1	KOR: 54,049

=== Compilation albums ===
Title	Album details	Peak chart positions				Sales
Title	Album details	KOR	JPN	TWN	TWN East Asian (Note: Position was taken from 2010 week 17 for MBLAQ Taiwan Special Album)	Sales
MBLAQ Taiwan Special Album	Released: August 11, 2010; Label: Universal Music Taiwan; Format: CD, digital download	—	—	17	5	
BLAQ Memories	Released: March 7, 2012; Label: Gr8! Records; Format: CD, digital download	—	18	—	—	JPN: 6,600
"—" denotes releases that did not chart or were not released in that region.

== Extended plays ==
Title	Details	Peak chart positions			Sales
Title	Details	KOR	TWN	TWN East Asian (Note: Position was taken from 2012 week 16 for 100% Ver., 2013 week 36 for Sexy Beat.)	Sales
Just BLAQ	Released: October 14, 2009; Label: J. Tune Camp; Format: CD, digital download	29	—	—	KOR: 19,986 (Note: Album sales for 2009 unavailable.)
Y	Released: May 17, 2010; Label: J.Tune Camp; Format: CD, digital download	3	—	—	KOR: 30,929
Mona Lisa	Released: July 12, 2011; Label: J.Tune Camp; Format: CD, digital download	1	—	—	KOR: 43,898; JPN: 3,193
100% Ver.	Released: January 10, 2012; Re-released (as BLAQ% Ver.): March 21, 2012; Label: J.Tune Camp; Format: CD, digital download	1	10	4	KOR: 81,475; JPN: 2,334
Sexy Beat	Released: June 4, 2013; Re-released (as Love Beat): August 12, 2013; Label: J. Tune Camp; Format: CD, digital download	1	17	5	KOR: 69,941; JPN: 616
Broken	Released: March 24, 2014; Label: J. Tune Camp; Format: CD, digital download	1	—	—	KOR: 18,597
Winter	Released: November 25, 2014; Label: J. Tune Camp; Format: CD, digital download	5	—	—	KOR: 6,881
Mirror	Released: June 9, 2015; Label: J. Tune Camp; Format: CD, digital download	6	—	—	KOR: 7,894
"—" denotes releases that did not chart or were not released in that region.

== Singles ==
Title	Year	Peak chart positions						Sales and Certifications	Album
Title	Year	KOR Gaon	KOR Hot 100	JPN Hot 100	JPN Oricon	TWN	TWN East Asian (Note: Position was taken from 2011 week 20 for "Your Luv," 2011 week 44 for "Baby U.")	Sales and Certifications	Album
Korean
"Oh Yeah"	2009	158	—	—	—	—	—		Just BLAQ
"G.O.O.D luv"	2009	134	—	—	—	—	—		Just BLAQ
"Y"	2010	5	—	—	—	—	—	KOR: 1,889,950 (DL)	Y
"Cry"	2011	20	—	—	—	—	—	KOR: 981,539	BLAQ Style
"Stay"	2011	16	—	—	—	—	—		BLAQ Style
"Again" (다시)	2011	23	—	—	—	—	—		BLAQ Style - 3D Edition
"Mona Lisa"	2011	8	37	—	—	—	—		Mona Lisa
"You & I"	2011	55	—	—	—	—	—		Non-album singles
"White Forever"	2011	44	—	—	—	—	—		Non-album singles
"Scribble"	2012	8	15	—	—	—	—	KOR: 794,781 (DL)	100% Ver.
"This Is War"	2012	6	8	—	—	—	—	KOR: 1,633,902 (DL)	100% Ver.
"100%"	2012	30	36	—	—	—	—	KOR: 210,362 (DL)	BLAQ% Ver.
"Smoky Girl"	2013	18	21	—	—	—	—	KOR: 293,640 (DL)	Sexy Beat
"No Love"	2013	40	61	—	—	—	—		Love Beat
"Our Relationship" (우리 사이)	2014	39	58	—	—	—	—	KOR: 44,847 (DL)	Broken
"Be a Man" (남자답게)	2014	19	59	—	—	—	—	KOR: 111,899 (DL)	Broken
"Spring, Summer, Autumn and..." (봄 여름 가을 그리고...)	2014	60	—	—	—	—	—		Winter
"Mirror"	2015	80	—	—	—	—	—	KOR: 36,512	Mirror
Japanese
"Your Luv"	2011	—	—	4	2	18	9	JPN: 49,000	
"Baby U!"	2011	—	—	6	2	—	5	JPN: 45,000	
"Mona Lisa"	2013	—	—	15	15	—	—	JPN: 13,000	
"Still in Love"	2014	—	—	73	14	—	—	JPN: 7,000	
"—" denotes releases that did not chart or were not released in that region.

== Other charted songs ==
Title	Year	Peak chart positions		Album
Title	Year	KOR Gaon	KOR Hot 100	Album
"One Better Day"	2010	81	—	Y
"Last Luv"	2010	106	—	Y
"Darling"	2011	178	—	BLAQ Style
"Rust"	2011	179	—	BLAQ Style
"You're My +"	2011	192	—	BLAQ Style
"Throw Away"	2011	198	—	BLAQ Style
"Can't Come Back"	2011	149	—	BLAQ Style - 3D Edition
"You"	2011	185	—	BLAQ Style - 3D Edition
"I Think You Know"	2011	126	—	Mona Lisa
"I Should Not Say"	2011	137	—	Mona Lisa
"I Don't Know"	2011	138	—	Mona Lisa
"One"	2011	157	—	Mona Lisa
"Run"	2012	129	—	100% Ver.
"She's Breathtaking"	2012	135	—	100% Ver.
"Hello My EX"	2012	164	—	100% Ver.
"R U OK?"	2013	171	—	Sexy Beat
"Sexy Beat"	2013	179	—	Sexy Beat
"—" denotes releases that did not chart or were not released in that region.

== Soundtrack appearances ==
Soundtrack Information	Track	Remarks
Fugitive (도망자) OST: Released October 13, 2010	Running & Running; Bang Bang Bang (뱅뱅뱅)	
Lie To Me (내게 거짓말을 해봐) OST Part. 3: Released May 31, 2011	I Belong To You	
Scent of a Woman (여인의 향기) OST: Released July 29, 2011	You & I (유앤아이)	G.O, Seungho, and Joon sang the soundtrack.
Beelzebub (OP Japanese Anime): Released October 26, 2011	Baby U!	
Full House Animated Movie OST: Unreleased	Unknown	
KPOP Best Survival (K-POP 최강 서바이벌) OST Part. 1: Released March 18, 2012	I Already Knew (알고 있었어)	G.O and Mir sang the soundtrack.
Ghost (유령) OST: Released July 17, 2012	We Were Both In Love (같이 사랑했잖아)	
The King Of Dramas (드라마의 제왕) OST Part. 4: Released December 26, 2012	Winter Rain (천국이니까)	G.O and Mir sang the soundtrack.
IRIS II (아이리스 II) OST Part.5: Released March 20, 2013	What a fool I am (바보같은 나)	G.O and Mir sang the soundtrack.
We Got Married: Global (우리 결혼했어요: 글로벌) OST Part. 5: Released June 30, 2013	Tonight (오늘밤)	
I Need Romance 3 (로맨스가 필요해 3) OST Part. 3: Released January 27, 2014	You	G.O sang the soundtrack.
Doctor Stranger (닥터 이방인) OST; Part. 4: Released June 3, 2014	As If Tomorrow Won't Come (내일이 안 올 것처럼)	G.O sang the soundtrack.
The Girl's Ghost Story (소녀괴담) OST: Released June 26, 2014	The Place You Left (니가 떠난 그 자리)	
Madame Antoine (마담 앙트완) OST Part. 2: Released February 13, 2016	No Love Feeling (사랑무감증)	G.O sang the soundtrack.
Happy Home (가화만사성) OST Part. 4: Released April 24, 2016	Say You Love Me (사랑한다고 말해요)	Seungho sang the soundtrack.

== Videography ==
=== Video albums ===
List of media, with selected chart positions
Title	Album details	Peak positions
Title	Album details	JPN
Mona Lisa Style	Released: December 7, 2011; Label: Sony; Format: DVD	45
Men in MBLAQ: 2011 the First Concert	Released: June 27, 2012; Label: Sony; Format: DVD	65
This Is War: Music Story	Released: June 27, 2012; Label: Sony; Format: DVD	149
MBLAQ 2012 the Blaq% Tour in Japan	Released: June 2, 2013; Label: Sony; Format: DVD	35

=== Music videos ===
List of music videos, showing year released and director
Title	Year	Director(s)
Korean
"Oh Yeah"	2009	Joo Hee-sun
"G.O.O.D Luv"	2009	Unknown
"Y"	2010	Hong Won-ki
"Cry"	2011	Hong Won-ki
"Stay"	2011	Hong Won-ki
"Mona Lisa"	2011	Joo Hee-sun
"White Forever"	2011	Unknown
"This is War"	2012	Hong Won-ki
"Smoky Girl"	2013	Unknown
"No Love"	2013	Unknown
"Be a Man"	2014	Woogie Kim
"Mirror"	2015	Unknown
Japanese
"Your Luv"	2011	Ishii Takahide
"Baby U"	2011	Mao Muramatsu
"Mona Lisa"	2013	Lim Sung-kwan
"Still in Love"	2014	Unknown
