= Mir (singer) =

South Korean musician (born 1991)

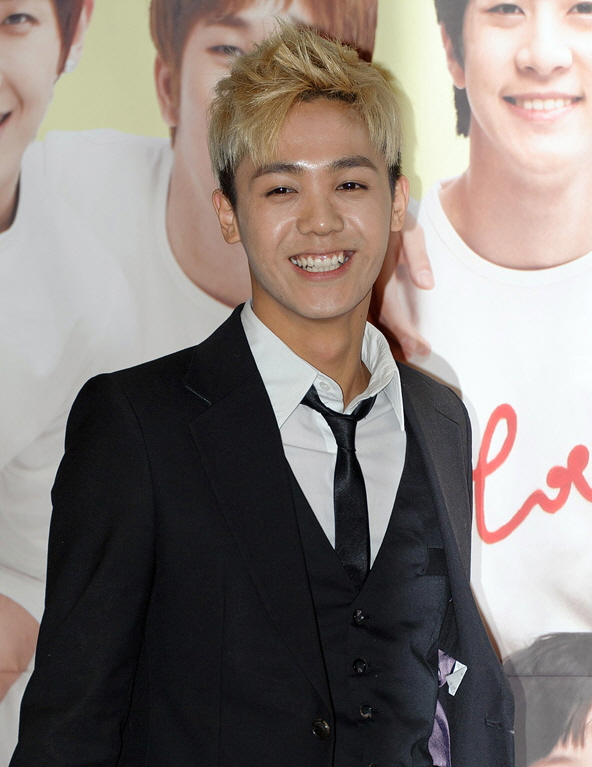
- Mir (MBLAQ) at the press conference of KBS Joy Hello Baby, on January 18, 2012
- Born: Bang Cheol-yong; March 10, 1991 (age 35); Bukha-myeon, Jangseong County, South Korea
- Occupations: Singer; dancer; rapper; actor
- Years active: 2009–2016
- Spouse: Unknown (m. 2025)
- Relatives: Go Eun-ah (sister)
- Musical career
- Genres: K-pop
- Instrument: Vocals
- Label: J. Tune Camp

Korean name
- Hangul: 방철용
- RR: Bang Cheolyong
- MR: Pang Ch'ŏryong

Stage name
- Hangul: 미르
- RR: Mireu
- MR: Mirŭ

Bang Cheol-yong (Korean: 방철용, born March 10, 1991), known professionally as Mir, is a South Korean singer, rapper, dancer, and actor. He is a member of the guy group MBLAQ. He enlisted in the army in 2016. He was discharged in July 2018.

== Early life ==
Mir was born in Bukha-myeon, Jangseong County, South Korea in the countryside.

== Career ==
=== MBLAQ (2009–2015) ===
Mir is the rapper and youngest member of the group MBLAQ. In 2011, Mir had injured himself, he had undergo spinal disc surgery, but returned to perform with the group after being inactive due to his injury. During the time with MBLAQ, Mir wrote the lyrics to "You're my +" and "Can't Come Back" alongside G.O around the year 2011.

In February 2012, Mir shared a picture on his Twitter of G.O working really hard on a new album (BLAQ%Ver.) for MBLAQ. On March 1, MBLAQ started their promotions for Run on M! Countdown. Also in 2012 Mir and G.O made a sub unit song where they both sang the song "Wild" for their Asia tour.

In 2013, Mir described their song Smoky Girl as an addictive song with sexy choreography. During the release of the album "Sexy Beat" during a photo shoot for Cosmopolitan Korea.

=== Solo activities (2010–present) ===
During the 2010 FIFA World Cup, MTV Korea created a program called Idol United, where members of male idol groups formed a soccer team to compete against other soccer teams. The fourteen-member team consisted of members from U-KISS, ZE:A, F.Cuz, and The Boss, with MBLAQ members being Seungho, Lee Joon and Mir.

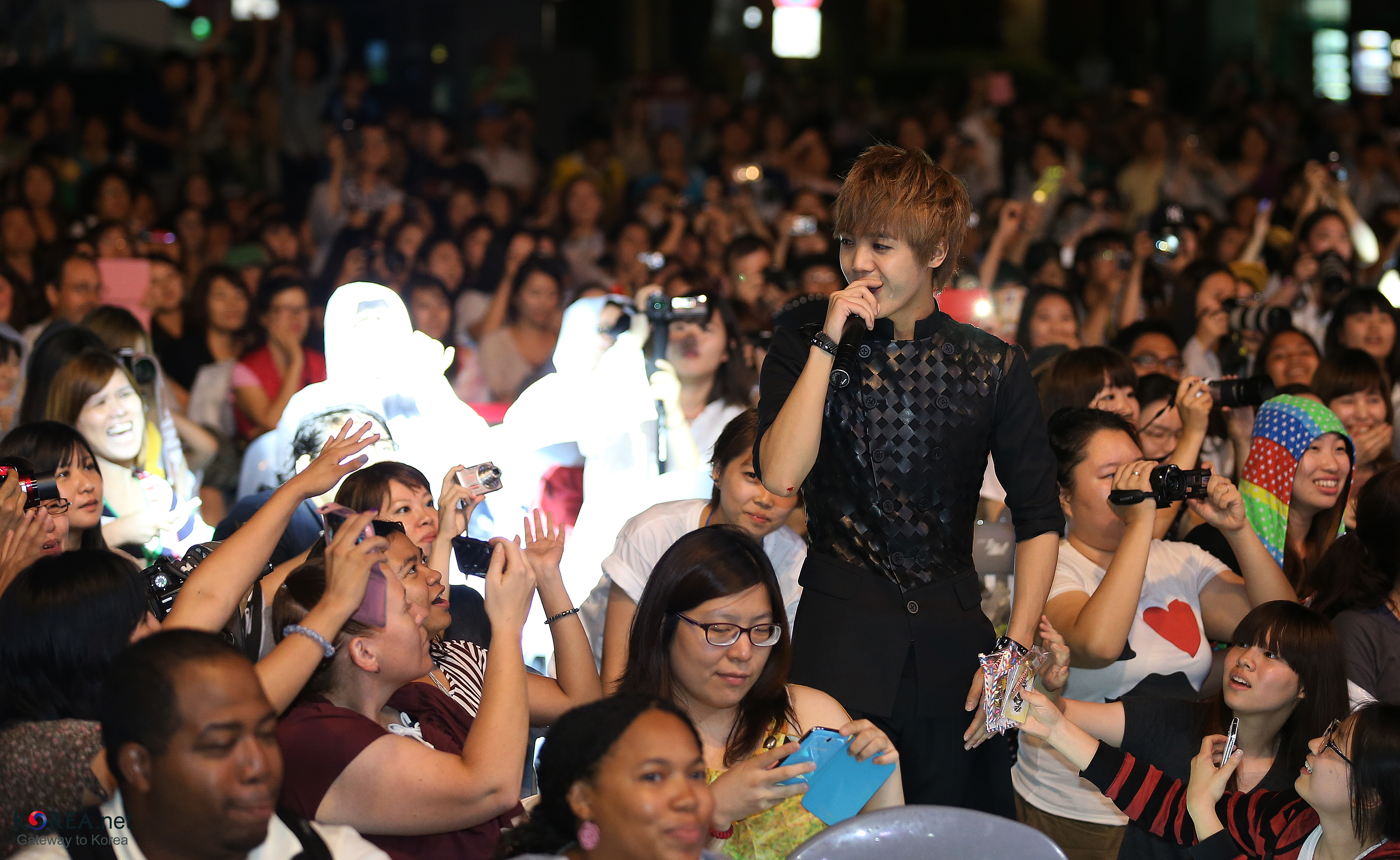
Mir at 2013 Concert

On February 21, 2010, Mir was featured on the song "Bad Person" by former member of Baby Vox Re.V, Ahn Jin Kyung. Where she performed the song on Inkigayo. On August 19, 2014, Mir has said that he is thinking of making a solo debut but nothing has been planned at the moment. During the same time of 2010 he collaborated with Kan Mi-youn on the song "Going Crazy" which also featured Lee Joon of MBLAQ. As of July 14, 2016, Mir has enlisted himself in the army to do his time. This came as a surprise to all fans out there who were trying to understand about him and the group's activity. He says, "I'm sorry I couldn't tell you sooner. As the time comes for all the men in Korea to enlist, it also makes me think that isn't this that time for me too? I hope that you do not worry or be upset".

=== Acting career (2012–present) ===
On November 11, 2012, Mir was in the reality TV show called The Romantic and Idol. He shared the screen time with Jun. K of 2PM, Park Hyung-sik of ZE:A, JB of JJ Project/Got7, and Seung Ah of Rainbow, Jei of Fiestar, Nam Ji-hyun of 4Minute, and Hyejeong of AOA. All were part of the first season. Around 2012, he was on the second season of Law of the Jungle and was known as the 3rd idol on the show. On August 11, 2015, Mir was on the kids musical program called "The Fairies in My Arms" alongside Spica's Yang Ji-won and GFriend's Sinb as a hero who saves weak children.

== Personal life ==
His sisters are Go Eun-ah and Bang Hyo-sun. His parents are Han Sung-sook and Bang Ki-soon.

Mir married a non-celebrity on December 21, 2025.

== Discography ==
=== Solo Artist ===
Year	Song	Album	With
2012	"Wild"	Non-album singles	G.O

=== Featured Artist ===
Year	Song	Album	Artists
2010	"Bad Person" (feat. Mir)	Non-album singles	Ahn Jin Kyung
2010	"Going Crazy" (feat. Mir and Lee Joon of MBLAQ)	Non-album singles	Kan Mi-youn
2011	"Even in My Dreams" (feat. Mir)	Non-album singles	GO
2012	"Do You Remember" (feat. Mir and Lee Joon of MBLAQ)	Non-album singles	Kim Jo-han

=== OST's (Original Sound Track) ===
Year	Song	Albums	With
2012	"I Knew"	Strongest K-POP Star Survival OST Part 1	G.O
2012	"Because It's Heaven (Winter Rain)"	The King of Dramas OST Part 4	G.O
2013	"What a fool I am"	Iris II OST Part 5	G.O

== Songwriting credits ==
Year	Album	Song	Lyrics		Music	
Year	Album	Song	Credited	With	Credited	With
2011	BLAQ Style	"You're My +"	Yes	Rado, Ji-in, Won-taek	No	Rado, Ji-in & Won-taek
2011	BLAQ Style	"Can't Come Back"	Yes	N/A	No	G.O
2012	BLAQ Memories	"You're My +" (Japanese Version)	Yes	Rado, Ji-in, Won-taek	No	Rado, Ji-in & Won-taek
2013	Sexy Beat	"R U OK?"	Yes	G.O	No	G.O & Primary
2013	Sexy Beat	"Pretty Girl" (소녀)	Yes	MAYBEE	No	Kim Kun-woo & Seo Jung-mo
2013	Sexy Beat	"Dress Up"	Yes	Cheondung, AB&Co	No	Cheondung & Seo Jung-hwan
2013	Love Beat	"Prayer" (기도 (NEW), preview on MBLAQ's Idol Manager Episode 11)	Yes	G.O & Bukgeukgom	No	G.O & Bukgeukgom
2014	Broken	"Be a Man"	Yes	Wheesung	No	Wheesung, Lee Ki, Youngbae
2014	Broken	"Between Us"	Yes	S Kim	No	S Kim
2014	Broken	"12 Months"	Yes	Cheondung, Super Cheongdam	No	Cheondung, Super Cheongdam
2014	Broken	"Because There are Two"	Yes	G.O, Avengers	No	G.O, Avengers, Radio Galaxy
2014	Winter	"Spring, Summer, Autumn And..."	Yes	G.O, Retro Funky	No	G.O, Retro Funky

== Filmography ==
=== Music Videos ===
Year	Song	Artist/Group	Role
2010	"Bad Person"	Ahn Jin Kyung	Himself
2010	"Going Crazy"	Kan Mi-youn	Himself

=== Dramas ===
Year	Title	Role
2012	"The Romantic & Idol"	Himself

=== Television ===
Year	Title	Notes
2009	"Idol Show"	Himself
2012	"KPOP Best Survival"	Himself
2012	Law of the Jungle in Amazon/Galapagos	Himself
2013	"Immortal Song 2"	Himself
2015	"The Fairies in My Arms"	Himself

=== Performance ===
Date	Song	With	Title
February 21, 2010	Bad Person	Ahn Jin Kyung	Inkigayo
