= 2011 in South Korean music =

The following is a list of notable events and releases that happened in 2011 in music in South Korea.

== Award shows and festivals ==
=== Award ceremonies ===
2011 music award ceremonies in South Korea
Date	Event	Host
January 20	20th Seoul Music Awards	Sports Seoul
February 23	8th Korean Music Awards	Korean Popular Music Awards Committee
November 15	Korean Popular Culture and Arts Awards	Korea Creative Content Agency (KOCCA)
November 24	3rd Melon Music Awards	Kakao M
November 29	13th Mnet Asian Music Awards	CJ E&M (Mnet)

=== Festivals ===
2011 music festivals in South Korea
Date	Event	Host
October 11	Asia Song Festival	Korea Foundation for International Culture Exchange (KOFICE)
December 7	K-Pop World Festival	Ministry of Foreign Affairs (South Korea)
December 29	SBS Gayo Daejeon	Seoul Broadcasting System (SBS)
December 30	KBS Song Festival	Korean Broadcasting System (KBS)
December 31	MBC Gayo Daejejeon	Munhwa Broadcasting Corporation (MBC)

== Debuting and disbanded in 2011 ==
=== Debuting groups ===
- AA
- APeace
- Apink
- Aziatix
- B1A4
- Blady
- Block B
- Boyfriend
- Brave Girls
- Busker Busker
- C-REAL
- Chocolat
- Clover
- Dal Shabet
- F-ve Dolls
- Geeks
- Kim Heechul & Kim Jungmo
- M.I.B
- Myname
- N-Sonic
- N-Train
- Rania
- Sistar19
- Stellar
- Super Junior-D&E
- Troublemaker
- Ulala Session

=== Reformed groups ===
- Super Junior-M
- Turtles

=== Solo debuts ===
- DJ Clazzi
- Jieun
- Jang Jin-young
- Kahi
- Keith Ape
- Kim Jong-min
- Okasian
- Reddy
- Zion.T

=== Disbanded groups ===
- Paran
- SeeYa

== Releases in 2011 ==
=== First quarter ===
==== January ====
Date	Title	Artist	Genre(s)
3	Heartmade	Joo	R&B, Ballad
4	Supa Dupa Diva	Dal Shabet	Pop
5	Keep Your Head Down	TVXQ	Dance, R&B
6	Evolution	Infinite	Dance
6	Shy Boy	Secret	Dance
10	BLAQ Style	MBLAQ	Dance, R&B
13	Transform	Teen Top	Pop
14	Peekaboo	JQT	Pop
18	Black & White	G.NA	Dance, Electropop
18	Tok Tok	Mighty Mouth	Hip-hop, Pop
20	V.V.I.P	Seungri	Dance, R&B
21	See You Again	SeeYa	Dance

==== February ====
Date	Title	Artist	Genre(s)
10	1.0	10cm	Acoustic folk
14	Come Back, You Bad Person	Kahi	Pop
14	Dalmatian	Dalmatian	Dance, Hip-hop
16	Real+	IU	Ballad, Electronic
16	Charming Five Girls	F-ve Dolls	Dance
22	BLAQ Style – 3D Edition	MBLAQ	Dance, R&B
24	Tonight	Big Bang	Hip-hop, Electropop

==== March ====
Date	Title	Artist	Genre(s)
10	Heart Beats	K.Will	Ballad
11	Tok Tok	Mighty Mouth	Hip-hop
16	Before U Go	TVXQ	Dance, R&B
17	Inspirit	Infinite	Dance
17	Lovability	ZE:A	Dance
18	Girl's Day Party #3	Girl's Day	Dance
21	First Step	CNBLUE	Rock
25	Travel of Only One-Time	Monni	Rock
30	Bran New Kiss	U-KISS	K-pop, Electropop, ballad
31	Classic Over	Clover	Hip-hop

=== Second quarter ===
==== April ====
Date	Title	Artist	Genre(s)
2	Aigoo	Turtles	Hip hop
5	4Minutes Left	4Minute	Dance, Electropop
7	Unveiled	Brian Joo	Pop, R&B
8	So Girls	Rainbow	Dance
8	Big Bang Special Edition	Big Bang	Hip-hop, Electropop
14	Do You Wanna B?	Block B	Hip-hop, Dance
14	Pink Rocket	Dal Shabet	Dance
18	Seven Springs of Apink	Apink	Dance
20	Pinocchio	F(x)	Dance, Electronica
21	Let's Fly	B1A4	Dance
22	Xenos	X-5	Dance
27	Take a Deeper Look	Jay Park	Hip-hop, R&B
29	Virgin	After School	Dance, Electropop

==== May ====
Date	Title	Artist	Genre(s)
3	Ma Boy	Sistar19	Pop
6	Electric Travel	The RockTigers	Rockabilly
9	Golden Lady	Lim Jeong-hee	Dance
11	Time To Play	F-ve Dolls	Dance
12	Let It Go	Youngsaeng	Dance
17	Fiction and Fact	Beast	Dance, Electropop
19	Pitta	Baek Ji-young	R&B
24	Return	F.T. Island	Rock
25	The, Park Jung Min	Park Jung Min (SS501)	Dance
29	Pitta	Baek Ji-young	K-pop

==== June ====
Date	Title	Artist	Genre(s)
1	Starlight Moonlight	Secret	Dance, Electropop
3	Midnight Circus	Sunny Hill	Dance
7	Break Down	Kim Hyun-joong	Dance, R&B
16	Solista Part 2	Kim Bum-soo	K-pop
17	Hot Summer	F(x)	Dance, Electronica
20	Hands Up	2PM	Electronic, R&B
21	8eight	8eight	Ballad
22	So Girls (repackage)	Rainbow	Dance
23	New Kids On The Block	Block B	Hip-hop, Dance
23	Vol. 4 Rainbow	Chu Ga-yeoul	Folk
27	Picnic (소풍)	Min Kyung-hoon	Ballad
29	John Travolta Wannabe	T-ara	Dance, Electropop

=== Third quarter ===
==== July ====
Date	Title	Artist	Genre(s)
5	Bubble Pop!	Hyuna	Pop
6	Good Night	HITT	Pop
7	Everyday	Girl's Day	Dance
12	Mona Lisa	MBLAQ	Dance
18	A Class	Miss A	Dance, Pop
21	Over the Top	Infinite	Dance, Electronic
26	Roman	Teen Top	Dance
28	2NE1 2nd Mini Album	2NE1	Dance, Electronic
29	Back To Da Future	Brave Girls	Dance

==== August ====
Date	Title	Artist	Genre(s)
2	Roly-Poly In Copacabana	T-ara	Dance, Electropop
3	Mr. Simple	Super Junior	R&B, Synthpop
9	So Cool	Sistar	Dance
11	Bling Bling	Dal Shabet	Dance
23	Top Girl	G.NA	Dance
25	Asura Balbalta	Leessang	Hip hop
29	Love Delight	Davichi	Pop, R&B

==== September ====
Date	Title	Artist	Genre(s)
1	Neverland	U-KISS	Dance
1	Loosen the Necktie	M. Street	Ballad
2	Girl’s Day Party #4	Girl's Day	Dance
6	Step	Kara	EDM
15	The First	Sung Si-kyung	Pop
15	In Heaven	JYJ	R&B, Dance
16	It B1A4	B1A4	Dance
16	Like 1st Mini Album "First Story"	Huh Gak	Pop, R&B
19	A-Cha	Super Junior	R&B, Synthpop
23	Sixth Sense	Brown Eyed Girls	Pop, R&B
23	We Are Rising	Vanilla Unity	Emo rock
26	Paradise (repackage)	Infinite	Dance, Electronic

=== Fourth quarter ===
==== October ====
Date	Title	Artist	Genre(s)
10	They Are Coming	Wheesung	R&B
10	Memory in FTISLAND	FTISLAND	Pop rock
11	Lucky	Kim Hyun-joong	R&B, Dance
12	Round 1	C-REAL	Dance
12	Part 1: State of the Art	Cho PD	Hip hop
18	Moving in Secret	Secret	Dance, Synthpop
19	The Boys	Girls' Generation	Dance, Electropop
21	Fever's End: Part 1	Tablo	Hip hop
25	Love You...Loved You	M. Street	ballad
25	Most Incredible Busters	M.I.B	Hip-hop
27	Tonight	Lee Seung-gi	Pop rock

==== November ====
Date	Title	Artist	Genre(s)
1	Fever's End: Part 2	Tablo	Hip hop
4	Jeongukjepae	Norazo	EDM, Rock
7	Wonder World	Wonder Girls	Dance, Retro
10	Blind	TRAX	EDM
11	Black Eyes	T-ara	Dance
16	Time to Rock da Show	Rania	Dance
22	Snow Pink	Apink	Dance, Electro hop
29	Last Fantasy	IU	Electronic, Pop

==== December ====
Date	Title	Artist	Genre(s)
1	Trouble Maker	Trouble Maker	Dance, R&B
2	You Hate Me	M. Street	Ballad
9	Dangerous	X-5	Dance
13	Winter: The Warmest Gift	Various	Holiday, Pop
16	Oppa, Oppa	Donghae & Eunhyuk	Dance, Ballad
28	New Breed Part 1	Jay Park	Dance

== Charts ==
- List of number-one hits of 2011 (South Korea)
- List of number-one albums of 2011 (South Korea)

== See also ==
- 2011 in South Korea
- List of South Korean films of 2011
