= Thunder (singer) =

South Korean singer

- 천둥
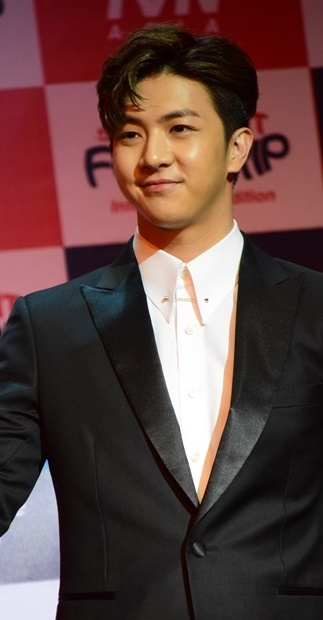
- Thunder in 2017
- Born: Park Sang-hyun; October 7, 1990 (age 36); Busan, South Korea
- Occupations: Singer-songwriter; actor; model
- Spouse: Jung Mi-mi (m. 2024)
- Relatives: Sandara Park (sister)
- Musical career
- Genres: K-pop; dance; R&B
- Instrument: Vocals
- Years active: 2009–present
- Labels: J. Tune Camp; APOP
- Member of: CATtRIEVER
- Formerly of: MBLAQ

Korean name
- Hangul: 박상현
- RR: Bak Sanghyeon
- MR: Pak Sanghyŏn

Stage name
- Hangul: 천둥
- RR: Cheondung
- MR: Ch'ŏndung

Park Sang-hyun (Korean: 박상현; born October 7, 1990), known professionally as Thunder (Korean: 천둥; RR: Cheondung), is a South Korean singer, songwriter, actor and model. He is a former member of South Korean boy band MBLAQ. On December 16, 2014, it was announced that he had departed from the group to focus on studying music. He signed with Mystic Entertainment's music label APOP on February 11, 2015 and released his debut extended play on December 7, 2016.

== Life and career ==
=== 1990–2008: Early life and career beginnings ===
Park Sang-hyun was born in Busan, South Korea, but grew up in the Philippines. He has two elder sisters, Sandara and Durami. Aside from his native Korean, he is also fluent in English and Tagalog, and can speak conversational Mandarin and Japanese.

His eldest sister, Sandara, achieved nationwide fame in the Philippines in 2004 after becoming the runner-up on the first season of Star Circle Quest, a talent search reality competition. He first appeared on national television when he attended the finale with his mother. Later on, as his sister began her hectic activities as a celebrity, a crew from one of South Korea's biggest television agencies recorded her daily life in the documentary My Name Is Sandara Park. This marked Thunder's first ever appearance on South Korean television.

Sandara's eventual decision to pursue activities in their home country led to their family's return to South Korea in 2007. By this time, Thunder had finished secondary education in the Philippines. It was later on revealed in a magazine interview that he had originally decided to pursue a professional career as a soccer player, specifically as a midfielder. He gave up and instead started auditioning for entertainment agencies, one of which was JYP Entertainment. He had taken dancing workshops offered by Sandara's home network back in the Philippines.

Thunder eventually became a trainee under LOEN Entertainment, where he met IU. He appeared in IU's debut music video for her song "Lost Child" and was also seen in a couple of videos with her wherein they sing Big Bang's "Lies" and Super Junior's "Sorry Sorry."

=== 2009–2014: MBLAQ ===
Thunder, Seung-ho, G.O, Lee Joon and Mir made their debut as MBLAQ on October 9, 2009, at Rain's Legend of Rainism concert where they performed various songs from their then-unreleased single album Just BLAQ. On October 14, MBLAQ officially released their debut single album Just BLAQ, along with the "Oh Yeah" music video. A day later, MBLAQ had their debut stage with their title song "Oh Yeah" on Mnet's M! Countdown. Also in October, he was featured in Lyn's "New Celebration" music video. In November, he starred in a commercial film with Wonder Girls for Cafe Mori.

Because of his androgynous face and modelesque image he was featured in Elle Girl's February 2010 issue. He was given a 4-page spread, where he showed off his unique yet fashionista chic image. In March 2010, Thunder alongside U-KISS' Dongho and Eli and Shinee's Key hosted a new variety show called Raising Idol. In March 2010, he also appears in K.Will's "Gift" music video. Thunder also participated in Mnet's Mnet Scandal. He was also a host of The M-Wave, a music program which aired on Arirang TV with Krystal Jung. Having lived in the Philippines, he participated in the cable TV show, Mom, I've gone crazy for English with Nicole Jung, where he was an English mentor to young children. In 2010, Thunder was also chosen to become Alba Heaven spokesperson. It is a job search site, focusing on connecting users who want part-time jobs with potential businesses and employers, he participated in a TV CF which was broadcast on the airwaves.

In 2011, Thunder was made a permanent cast member of the KBS show Imagination Arcade. He was featured in a six-page spread on the October issue of Singles, showing a completely different image. In December 2011, Thunder had a cameo role in jTBC drama Padam Padam where he played the role of Yang Kang-woo, the older brother of Yang Kang-chil (played by Jung Woo-sung).

In 2012, he was featured in two magazines: he posed shirtless for the March issue of Harper's Bazaar and the April issue of L'Officiel Hommes Korea; both were an eight-page spread. Also in April, Wanna Girls magazine named him as new fashionista icon of 2012, along with Jessica Jung, Hyomin and Yong Jun-hyung. In July 2012, Thunder released a self-composed solo song titled "Don't Go" for "The BLAQ% Tour" album. In October, Thunder started his career in runway as he walked for Lee Jae-ho's Coexistence Collection in S/S 2013 Seoul Fashion Week. In November, he walked for Korean designer Park Jong-cheol's fashion show 'Bling Bling Party' as part of SUNY Korea Festival.

In January 2013, Thunder was cast as the male lead in the MBC drama Nail Shop Paris, with Park Gyu-ri. In 2014, he was cast in the dance musical Moon Night, along with Seung-ho and Two X's Jiyou. In 2014, Thunder released his first single "Gone" which he composed himself. In March 2014, Thunder had graced the runway again for designer Lie Sang Bong's fashion show in 2014 F/W Seoul Fashion Week. He released his second single "Monster" later that year. On December 16, 2014, Thunder and Lee Joon officially withdrew from the group after their contracts expired.

=== 2015–present: Return to acting and Thunder ===
In 2015, he was cast in the role of Kang Hyun-seo in the MBC drama Make a Woman Cry. Starting with this drama, he is being credited by his birth name (except for music-related projects). In 2016, he made a cameo appearance on another MBC drama, Woman with a Suitcase, as Cheondung, a lawyer interviewing for the same job as Ma Seok-woo (played by Lee Joon).

On November 23, 2016, Mystic Entertainment revealed that Thunder would release new music in December. His self-titled debut extended play as a solo artist was released on December 7, 2016, and featured guest appearances by Goo Hara, Basick and Giantpink. Thunder participated in writing and composing all five tracks. The music video for the promotional single "Sign" features his sister Sandara. On February 6, 2017, it was announced that Thunder would be the first Korean idol to star in a Korean-Indonesian movie, titled Forever-Holidays in Bali. On April 19, before going over to Bali to film the movie, Thunder appeared in Indonesian music show "Dahsyat" to perform. It was a success with the hashtag #ThunderOnDahsyat trending second on Indonesian Twitter that morning.

Thunder debuted as part of the duo CATtRIEVER on January 21, 2024.

== Personal life ==
On July 13, 2023, Thunder announced he has been in a relationship with singer-actress Mimi, a former member of Gugudan, for four years. On December 19, 2023, it was reported the couple would marry next May. The couple married on May 26, 2024.

== Discography ==
=== Extended plays ===
Title	Album details	Peak chart positions	Sales
Title	Album details	KOR	Sales
Thunder	Released: December 7, 2016; Label: APOP Entertainment, LOEN Entertainment; Formats: CD, digital download; Track listing: 1. Look at Me (feat. Basick); 2. Sign (feat. Goo Hara); 3. Good; 4. Magic Spell; 5. In Time (feat. Giantpink)	24	KOR: 1,300
"—" denotes items which were not released in that country or failed to chart.

=== Singles ===
Title	Year	Peak chart positions		Album
Title	Year	Gaon		Album
Title	Year	Digital	Download	Album
"Blaq Cat"	2011	—	—	Non-album single
"Don't Go"	2012	97	82	Non-album single
"Gone"	2014	—	—	Non-album single
"Monster"	2014	—	—	Non-album single
"Sign" (featuring Goo Hara)	2016	—	—	Thunder
"Bomb Bomb Bomb"	2018	—	—	Non-album single
"—" denotes items which were not released in that country or failed to chart.

=== As featured artist ===
Title	Year	Peak chart positions		Album
Title	Year	KOR	JPN	Album
"Merry Christmas Ahead" (IU featuring Thunder)	2010	7	—	Real
"Run Away" (Vision Wei with Lee Joon and Thunder)	2011	—	—	Daybreak
"—" denotes items which were not released in that country or failed to chart.

== Filmography ==
=== Film ===
Year	Title	Role	Notes	Ref.
2018	Forever Holiday in Bali	Kay	Indonesian film	
2022	Lovely Voice: The Beginning		Musical	

=== Television drama ===
Title	Year	Role	Notes
Welcome to the Show	2011	Himself	Cameo; sitcom
Moon Night 90	2011	Koo Jun-yup	Fictional drama
Padam Padam	2011	Yang Kang-woo	Cameo
Strongest K-Pop Survival	2012	Himself	Cameo
Nail Shop Paris	2013	Jin	Lead role
Make a Woman Cry	2015	Kang Hyun-seo	Supporting role
We Broke Up	2015	Himself	Cameo; web drama
Woman with a Suitcase	2016	Cheondung	Cameo (episode 5)

=== Television shows ===
Title	Year	Notes	Ref.
King of Mask Singer	2017	Contestant (as the King of Toy Machines and Robot Fanatic)	
Dream Maker: Search for the Next Global Pop Group	2022–2023	Korean mentor	

=== Television show hosting ===
Title	Year	Notes
Raising Idols	2010	with Dongho, Eli and Key
The M Wave	2010	Co-hosted with Krystal Jung
Show! Music Core	2011	Ulsan Summer Festival MC with Lee Joon, Suzy and Ji-yeon special MC with G.O to accompany Suzy
M! Countdown	2012, 2013	special MC with G.O, special MC with Lee Joon
The Tasty One Shot	2015	Regular cast member

== Stage ==
Title	Year	Role	Notes
Moon Night Musical	2014	Lee Min-soo	Lead role
