= G.O (singer) =

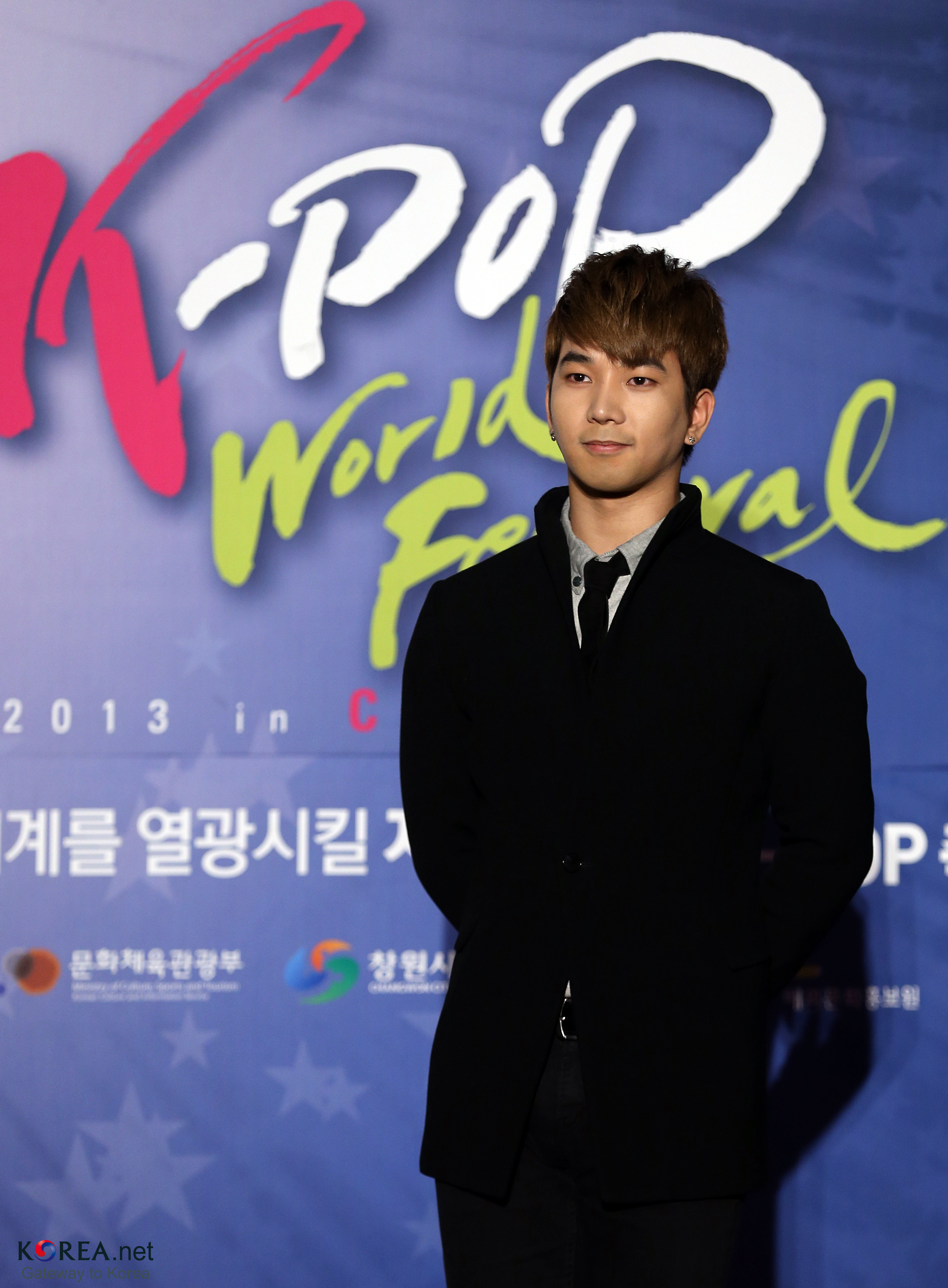
- G.O in 2013
- Born: Jung Byung-hee; 6 November 1987 (age 39); Changwon, South Korea
- Occupations: Singer-songwriter; actor
- Years active: 2007–2019
- Spouse: Choi Ye-seul (m. 2019)
- Musical career
- Genres: K-pop; R&B; Ballad
- Instrument: Vocals

Korean name
- Hangul: 정병희
- RR: Jeong Byeonghui
- MR: Chŏng Pyŏnghŭi

Jung Byung-hee (Korean: 정병희; born 6 November 1987), known professionally as G.O (Korean: 지오), is a South Korean singer-songwriter and actor. He is best known as a member of South Korean boy band MBLAQ.

== Personal life ==
He is the youngest in his family and has two older sisters. His hometown is Changwon.

He has narcolepsy.

On 28 September 2019, G.O married actress Choi Ye-seul.

== Music career ==
=== Ty Keys (2007) ===
In 2007, G.O debuted with Ty Keys, co-ed R&B group composed of a female and male vocalist and one male rapper. When the company went bankrupt, he went to court to end his contract.

=== MBLAQ (2009–2015) ===
Later in 2009, G.O debuted as the main vocalist for MBLAQ, a five-member boy group under J. Tune Entertainment. He trained with Rain who was the group's founder and mentor. The group debuted on 9 October 2009 at Rain's Legend of Rainism concert where they performed various songs from their then-unreleased single album Just BLAQ. Their performance was met with praise, with many concert spectators and fans considering them to be the next TVXQ. MBLAQ's first single, "Oh Yeah", was released to the public through a music video on 14 October 2009 with their debut single album, Just BLAQ releasing on the same day. MBLAQ made their broadcast debut with the song "Oh Yeah" on Mnet's M Countdown.

The group has starred in various South Korean variety shows as guests as well as in their own variety shows like Mnet's MBLAQ – The Art of Seduction, MBC's MBLAQ's Idol Army, Mnet's Sesame Player, KBS's Hello Baby Season 5, and MBC's Idol Manager.

MBLAQ made their Japanese debut on 3 May 2011 with an event held at the Kanagawa Lazona Kawasaki Plaza which gathered a reported 10, 000 fans. A day later, on 4 May, they released their first Japanese album Your Luv which immediately reached first position of the Oricon Daily Charts, selling more than 11,000 copies.

Since their debut, MBLAQ has released three single albums, three extended plays, and one studio album.

=== Solo career (2010–present) ===
In early 2010, G.O collaborated with J.ae in "I Can't Tell You This Is the End". Later he collaborated with Nassun for "O-IWI-O" and "One". On 11 and 12 November, the Group of Twenty Finance Ministers and Central Bank Governors (G20), who represents the 20 Major economies of the world, scheduled a summit Seoul. 20 idol singers from various popular South Korean groups were recruited to sing the theme song for the 2010 G20 Seoul Summit. G.O along with Gyuri (Kara), Seohyun (Girls' Generation), Jun. K (2PM), Changmin (2AM), Jaekyung (Rainbow), Jonghyun (Shinee), Sungmin (Super Junior), Kahi (After School), Luna (f(x)), Jieun (Secret), Junhyung (Beast), Gayoon (4minute), Min (miss A), Bumkey, G.NA, Son Dam-bi, Seo In-guk, IU, and Anna took part in recording the theme song, titled "Let's Go". In late 2010, G.O collaborated with JeA's Brown Eyed Girls in "Because You Sting" (released on 28 Dec.)."

On 4 July 2011, G.O finally released his long-awaited solo debut track, "Even In My Dreams". The song earned many headlines for being personally written and produced by himself. Unfortunately, G.O did not promote this song on music programs to prepare for MBLAQ's comeback.

On 16 October 2012, G.O was featured in Ailee's music video for her title single of the extended play, "I Will Show You".

On 20 November 2013, G.O. returned with a second solo digital single "Play That Song". The track is produced by renowned pianist Yiruma as well as 2FACE, raising the bar even higher and increasing anticipation.

== Television career ==
=== 2009 ===
In late 2009, MBLAQ's first aired program was Mnet's MBLAQ- The Art of Seduction, which received record ratings.

With their trip to Japan for Rain's fanmeet, music channel Mnet Japan decided to film a documentary of their stay, selecting them as the first stars of their show 2010 K-Pop Star series. The documentary, called Yo! Tokyo, aired in early 2010, showing the public their experience with Japanese culture and traditions over a period of four days.

On 15 December 2009, it was announced that the group would be part of season five of Idol Show (아이돌 군단의 떴다! 그녀!, lit. Idol Army, She Has Arrived!), with the first episode airing a day later. MBLAQ filmed a total of sixteen episodes.

=== 2010 ===
From 18 February 2010, G.O. along with his fellow member, Lee Joon took on the role of co-hosts (MCD Guys) for the music show M Countdown.

To coincide with the 2010 FIFA World Cup, MTV Korea created a program called Idol United, where members of male idol groups formed a soccer team to compete against other soccer teams. The fourteen-member team consisted of members from U-KISS, ZE:A, F.Cuz, and D-NA (Dae Guk Nam Ah), with MBLAQ members being Seungho, Lee Joon and Mir. At the end of May, MBLAQ participated in GOMTV's Making the Artist, a small documentary on their life as artists. MBLAQ filmed a total of four episodes documenting their promotions for Y.

Following their promotions for Y, MBLAQ were cast in the final series of Mnet's Celebrities Go to School.[6] Their mentor for the show is actor Kim Soo-Ro. The show started airing in August 2010. MBLAQ have filmed a cameo in Rain's 2010 drama Fugitive (도망자), where filming took place at the Saitama JEFF Hall.[7] The members of MBLAQ have also made an appearance in Joon's drama Housewife Kim Kwan Ja's third Activity.

=== 2011 ===
In March, MBLAQ took part in Mnet Wide's new corner, Refreshing Interview, with their own show called Sesame Player.[65] MBLAQ filmed a total of 13 episodes, and Infinite has been selected to film Season 2.

=== 2012 ===
They were the star fathers for Hello Baby season 5 where they take care and raise 3 children with different heritages.

G.O will participate on SBS next drama after Rooftop Prince, titled Ghost. Also, there is a plan for MBLAQ sub-unit album (G.O and Mir) release this year, maybe after he finish with the drama, following by Asian tour and MBLAQ next album around September.

G.O is a permanent member of the Immortal Songs 2 cast after the previous members left, along with other idols, like Luna (f(x)) and Shin Yong-jae (4Men).

=== 2013 ===
On 6 February 2013, MBLAQ's G.O., Kara's Seungyeon, ZE:A's Siwan, Secret's Jieun, and Infinite's Sungkyu will all be making cameos in the upcoming KBS2 sitcom A Bit of Love ('Remaining Love'). According to KBS reps, "The idols are not fixed cast members, but for about three weeks, they'll appear as the younger versions of the five main characters and leave a strong first impression." G.O. will be playing the younger role of manly man Lee Jae-ryong opposite to Jieun of Secret.

MBLAQ's G.O. and Rainbow's Go Woori are scheduled to appear in KBS 2TV's Couple Clinic – Love and War 2 for the Idol Special as the main couple. According to a KBS representative on the 15th through Starnews: “G.O. and Go Woori are confirmed to appear on the Idol Special on the May 17th broadcast of Love and War 2.” This episode is the second part of the Idol Special (first part previous aired in March) and will show a story that couples in their 20s and 30's will be able to relate to. It was also revealed that the two were chosen because they worked together in the past.

== Discography ==
=== Extended plays ===
| Title | Album details | Peak positions |
| Title | Album details | KOR |
|---|---|---|
| words | Released: 25 March 2019; Label: justbouncemusic; Formats: CD, digital download; Track listing: 1. After Spring; 2. I Often Dream These Days (요즘난니꿈을꾸곤해); 3. foreverlove 4. Dance On You; 5. we can't be | — |
"—" denotes release did not chart.

=== Singles ===
| Title | Year | Peak chart positions | Album |
| Title | Year | KOR Gaon | Album |
As lead artist
| "Even In My Dreams" (내 꿈에서라도) | 2011 | 45 | Non-album singles |
| "Play That Song" | 2013 | 53 | Non-album singles |
| "After Spring" | 2018 | — | words |
| "I Often Dream These Days" (요즘난니꿈을꾸곤해) | 2018 | — | words |
| "foreverlove" | 2019 | — | words |
Collaborations
| "O-IWI-O" with Nassun | 2010 | 38 | Non-album singles |
| "Because You Sting" (니가 따끔거려서) with JeA | 2010 | 12 | Non-album singles |
| "Wild" with Mir | 2012 | 68 | The BLAQ% Tour |
| "Good Dream" (좋은 꿈) with Dal of S.I.S | 2018 | — | Non-album single |
"—" denotes releases that did not chart or were not released in that region.

=== Soundtrack appearances ===
| Title | Year | Peak chart positions | Album |
| Title | Year | KOR Gaon | Album |
|---|---|---|---|
| "Believe" | 2011 | 92 | Mr. Idol OST |
| "I Knew" (알고 있었어) with Mir | 2012 | — | The Strongest K-Pop Survival OST |
| "Foolish Me" (바보같은 나) with Mir | 2013 | 77 | Iris II: New Generation OST |
| "You" | 2014 | — | I Need Romance 3 OST |
| "Like Tomorrow Won't Come" (내일이 안 올 것처럼) | 2014 | 57 | Doctor Stranger OST |
| "Numbness" (사랑무감증) | 2016 | — | Madame Antoine OST |
"—" denotes releases that did not chart or were not released in that region.

=== Lyrics and composition ===
Source: Korea Music Copyright Association, ID: W0700300

| Artist | Album | Title | Lyrics | Composer, arranger |
|---|---|---|---|---|
| Tykeys | TY PROJECT NO.1 | 07. Just Once | Jang Goon | Jeon Sang Hwan |
| MBLAQ | BLAQ Style 3D Edition Repackage | 03. Can't Come Back | Mir, G.O | G.O, Rado |
| G.O & Mir | Even in My Dreams | 01. Even in My Dreams | Mir, G.O | G.O, Park Soo Suk, Kim Gi Bum |
| G.O & Mir | Strongest K-Pop Survival OST | 01. I Already Knew | Mir, G.O | G.O, 1Take |
| G.O & Mir | THE BLAQ% TOUR | 01. Wild | Mir, G.O, 1Take | 1Take |
| A-Prince | You're the Only One | 01. You're The Only One | Mir, G.O | G.O, 1Take |
| G.O & Mir | IRIS 2 OST | 05. Foolish Me | Mir, G.O, Avengers, Hyun Jun Choi | G.O, Avengers, Hyun Jun Choi |
| MBLAQ | Sexy Beat | 03. R U OK | Mir, G.O | Primary, G.O |
| Outsider, G.O | Rebirth Outsider | 02. Bye U | G.O, Outsider | Jung Chang Wook |
| MBLAQ | Love Beat | 03. Prayer | Mir, G.O, Peebear | G.O, Peebear |
| MBLAQ | Broken | 06. Because There are Two | Mir, G.O, Avengers | G.O, Radio Galaxy, Avengers |
| MBLAQ | Broken | 07. Still With You Outro. | – | G.O, Avengers |
| G.O | Dr. Strange OST | 04. As If Tomorrow Won't Come | 김원 | 김원, G.O, 별나라언니 |
| MBLAQ | The Girl's Ghost Story OST | The Place You Left | Mir, G.O, Avengers, Hyun Jun Choi | G.O, Avengers, Hyun Jun Choi, Cha Min Young |
| ROO | OCN Bad Guys OST | Reason | 1Take | G.O, 1Take |
| MBLAQ | Winter | 02. Spring Summer Fall And Winter... | Mir, G.O, Retro Funkee | G.O, Retro Funkee |
| MBLAQ | Mirror | 02. Mirror | MBLAQ, 1Take | 1Take |
| MBLAQ | Mirror | 05. Eyes On You | – | G.O, Retro Funkee, 1Take |
| MBLAQ | Mirror | 06. I Know U Want Me | Mir, G.O, Retro Funkee | G.O, Retro Funkee |

== Filmography ==
=== Films ===
| Year | Title | Role | Ref. |
|---|---|---|---|
| 2017 | Daddy You, Daughter Me | Jeon Gong-gil | |

=== Television dramas ===
| Year | Title | Role | Ref. |
|---|---|---|---|
| 2010 | Housewife Kim Kwang-ja's Third Activities | Jin's group member (cameo) | |
| 2011 | Welcome to the Show | Himself (cameo) | |
| 2012 | Salamander Guru and The Shadows | Myung Shik (cameo) | |
| 2012 | Ghost | Lee Tae-kyun | |
| 2013 | The Clinic for Married Couples: Love and War | Joo Won (cameo) | |
| 2013 | Pure Love | young Choi Min-Soo | |

=== Television shows ===
| Year | Title | Notes | Ref. |
|---|---|---|---|
| 2010 | M Countdown | Rotating host; with Nichkhun, Lee Jun-ho, Hwang Chan-sung, Jo Kwon, Jeong Jin-woon, Kang Min-hyuk, and Lee Joon | |
| 2011 | Immortal Songs 2 | Contestant | |
| 2015 | King of Mask Singer | Contestant | |

== Musical theater ==
| Year | Title | Location | Role | Ref. |
|---|---|---|---|---|
| 2012–2013 | Gwanghwamun Sonata | Osaka; Tokyo | HyeonWoo | |
| 2014 | Seopyeonje | Seoul | DongHo | |
| 2014 | The Kingdom of the Winds | Seoul | HoDong | |

== Awards and nominations ==
| Year | Award | Category | Nominated work | Result | Ref. |
|---|---|---|---|---|---|
| 2014 | The Musical Award | Best Newcomer Actor | Seopyeonje | Won | |
