= Sexy Beat =

EP by MBLAQ
- Released: June 4, 2013 (Digital); June 11, 2013 (CD); August 12, 2013 (Repackage)
- Recorded: 2013
- Genre: K-pop, pop
- Length: 19:03 (Sexy Beat); 30:51 (Love Beat)
- Language: Korean, English
- Label: J. Tune Camp; CJ E&M Music and Live

MBLAQ chronology
BLAQ Memories -Best in Korea- (2012)	Sexy Beat (2012)	Broken (2014)

Singles from Sexy Beat
- 1. "Smoky Girl" Released: June 10, 2013

Alternative cover
- Repackaged album cover as Love Beat

Singles from Love Beat
- 1. "No Love" Released: August 11, 2013

Sexy Beat is the fifth EP by the South Korean boy group MBLAQ. It includes the single "Smoky Girl". Love Beat, a repackaged studio album, was released two months later on August 12, 2013.

== Track listing ==
=== Track listing for Sexy Beat ===
No.	Title	Lyrics	Music	Arrangement	Length
1.	"Sexy Beat"	Cheondung, Seo Jung-hwan, AB&Co	Cheondung & Seo Jung-hwan	Seo Jung-hwan	1:29
2.	"Smoky Girl" (스모키걸)	Crush, Simon D, Zion.T	Primary & Zion.T	Primary	3:30
3.	"R U OK?"	Mir & G.O	G.O & Primary	Primary	3:24
4.	"Celebrate"	Lee Si-woo & Yoon Young-min	Lee Si-woo & Yoon Young-min	Yoon Young-min	3:29
5.	"Pretty Girl" (소녀)	Mir & MAYBEE	Kim Kun-woo & Seo Jung-mo	Kim Kun-woo & Seo Jung-mo	3:23
6.	"Dress Up"	Mir, Cheondung, AB&Co	Cheondung & Seo Jung-hwan	Seo Jung-hwan	3:48
Total length:					19:03

=== Track listing for the repackaged version Love Beat ===
No.	Title	Lyrics	Music	Arrangement	Length
1.	"No Love"	Duble Sidekick & David Kim	Duble Sidekick	Duble Sidekick	3:47
2.	"I Don't Know"	Duble Sidekick & David Kim	Duble Sidekick, Ichiro Suezawa, Drew Ryan Scott	Duble Sidekick	4:07
3.	"Prayer" (기도, preview on MBLAQ's Idol Manager Episode 11)	Mir, G.O, Bukgeukgom	G.O & Bukgeukgom	Bukgeukgom	3:54
4.	"Sexy Beat"	Cheondung & Seo Jung-hwan	Cheondung & Seo Jung-hwan	Seo Jung-hwan	1:29
5.	"Smoky Girl" (스모키걸)	Crush, Simon D, Zion.T	Primary & Zion.T	Primary	3:30
6.	"R U OK?"	Mir & G.O	G.O & Primary	Primary	3:24
7.	"Celebrate"	Lee Si-woo & Yoon Young-min	Lee Si-woo & Yoon Young-min	Yoon Young-min	3:29
8.	"Pretty Girl" (소녀)	Mir & MAYBEE	Kim Kun-woo, Seo Jung-mo	Kim Kun-woo, Seo Jung-mo	3:23
9.	"Dress Up"	Cheondung & AB&Co	Cheondung & Seo Jung-hwan	Seo Jung-hwan	3:48
Total length:					30:51

== Chart performance ==
=== Sexy Beat ===
==== Album chart ====
Chart	Peak position
Gaon Weekly album chart	1
Gaon Monthly album chart	2

==== Single chart ====
Song	Peak chart position	
Song	KOR	KOR
Song	Gaon Chart	K-Pop Billboard
"Smoky Girl"	18	21

==== Sales and certifications ====
Chart	Amount
Gaon Physical Album Sales Chart	58,175

=== Love Beat ===
==== Album chart ====
Chart	Peak position
Gaon Weekly album chart	5
Gaon Monthly album chart	8

==== Sales and certifications ====
Chart	Amount
Gaon Physical Album Sales Chart	36,746

== Release history ==
Country	Date	Format	Label
South Korea	June 4, 2013	Digital download	J.Tune Camp CJ E&M Music
South Korea	June 11, 2013	CD	J.Tune Camp CJ E&M Music
