= 100% Ver. =

EP by MBLAQ
- Released: January 10, 2012 (South Korea)
- Recorded: 2011
- Genres: K-pop, pop, dance
- Length: 17:39 (100% Ver.); 25:39 (BLAQ% Ver.)
- Language: Korean
- Label: J. Tune Camp

MBLAQ chronology
| Mona Lisa (2011) | 100% Ver. (2012) | BLAQ Memories -Best in Korea- (2012) |

Singles from 100% Ver.
- 1. "Scribble" Released: January 3, 2012; 2. "This Is War" Released: January 10, 2012; 3. "Run" Released: March 1, 2012 (Promotional single)

Singles from BLAQ% Ver.
- 1. "100%" Released: March 21, 2012 (Promotional single)

100% Ver. is the fourth EP released by South Korean boy band MBLAQ. The album was released online on January 10, 2012. The online pre-orders started on January 10, 2012. It was recently revealed that 100% Ver. had over 40,000 pre-orders. The album consists of five new tracks, and the title track This Is War is a Dance Ballad with Orchestra Music. On March 21, the EP was re-released under the name "BLAQ% Ver.". The song "100%" was supposed to be the title track of the re-release, but the group will not promote the song to focus on solo activities.

== Background ==
On January 5, MBLAQ released their teaser of "This is War" on their official YouTube channel, J.Tune Camp. The video reveals the 5 members in their ensemble scene, and some small snippets of the full music video. The teaser ends with the members standing center stage with a string orchestra gathered on either side of them, shooting at the audience and finishes with a violent blood splatter that reveals their lead single's name, "전쟁이야 (This is War)". On the same day, the first concept photo was also released by J.Tune Camp. The directors jokingly stated that there was a particular member, Mir, who wanted to shave his hair bald, however they took fans' opinions in to consideration and only let the member go as far as a mohawk.

Not much has been said by the members about their secondary single, "낙서 (Scribble)". The group members only said, "You will be able to know about this song by listening to it rather than by us explaining about it". "Scribble" was released on music portal websites on January 3, 2012. When "Scribble" was released, it reached number one on Soribada and Bugs Music, number three on Mnet's Music chart, and number four on Cyworld Music. "Scribble" was also promoted along with their lead single, "전쟁이야 (This is War)", multiple times on stage as their second single from their 100% Ver..

100% Ver. was released on the same day as the music video, containing a total of five songs: "Run", "전쟁이야 (This is War)", "낙서 (Scribble)", "아찔한 그녀 (She's Breathtaking)", and "Hello My Ex" respectively.

== Promotions and awards ==
On January 12, 2012, the group kicked off the promotion of their mini album on the TV music show Mnet's M! Countdown, performing both "Scribble" and the album's title track "This Is War". The group performed the last promotional stage of "Scribble" on January 15, 2012, on SBS's Inkigayo, and they held the goodbye stage of "This Is War" on February 12, 2012 on SBS's Inkigayo. On January 26 and February 2, 2012, MBLAQ won on M! Countdown with their title song This is War. On March 1, 2012, the group started the follow-up promotion of their mini album with track "Run" on Mnet's M! Countdown.

== Track listing ==
=== Track list for 100% Ver. ===
| No. | Title | Lyrics | Music | Arrangement | Length |
|---|---|---|---|---|---|
| 1. | "Run" | Duble Sidekick | Duble Sidekick | Duble Sidekick & Ichiro Suezawa | 3:12 |
| 2. | "This Is War" (전쟁이야; Jeonjaengiya) | Duble Sidekick | Duble Sidekick | Duble Sidekick | 3:51 |
| 3. | "Scribble" (낙서; Nakseo) | Duble Sidekick | Duble Sidekick | Jang Jun-ho | 3:35 |
| 4. | "She's Breathtaking" (아찔한 그녀; Ajjilhan Geunyeo) | Duble Sidekick | Duble Sidekick | Duble Sidekick | 3:15 |
| 5. | "Hello My EX" | Duble Sidekick | Duble Sidekick & Ichiro Suezawa | Duble Sidekick & Ichiro Suezawa | 3:46 |
| Total length: | | | | | 17:39 |

=== Track list for the repackaged edition: BLAQ% Ver. ===
| No. | Title | Writer(s) | Arrangement | Length |
|---|---|---|---|---|
| 1. | "BLAQ%" (Theme) (feat. Duble Sidekick (이단옆차기)) | | Duble Sidekick | 1:15 |
| 2. | "100%" | Duble Sidekick | Duble Sidekick | 3:33 |
| 3. | "Love Is Coming (Beautiful)" (사랑이 온다; Sarangi Onda) | Duble Sidekick | Duble Sidekick | 3:13 |
| 4. | "Run" | | Duble Sidekick & Ichiro Suezawa | 3:12 |
| 5. | "This Is War" (전쟁이야; Jeonjaengiya) | | Duble Sidekick | 3:51 |
| 6. | "Scribble" (낙서; Nakseo) | | Jang Jun-ho | 3:35 |
| 7. | "She's Breathtaking" (아찔한 그녀; Ajjilhan geunyeo) | | Duble Sidekick | 3:15 |
| 8. | "Hello My EX" | | Duble Sidekick & Ichiro Suezawa | 3:46 |
| Total length: | | | | 25:39 |

== Chart performance ==
=== 100% Ver. ===
==== Album chart ====
| Chart | Peak position |
|---|---|
| Gaon Weekly album chart | 1 |
| Gaon Monthly album chart | 1 |

==== Single chart ====
| Song | Peak chart position | |
| Song | KOR | KOR |
| Song | Gaon Chart | K-Pop Billboard |
|---|---|---|
| "Scribble" | 8 | 15 |
| "This Is War" | 6 | 8 |
| "Run" | 129 | — |

==== Sales and certifications ====
| Chart | Amount |
|---|---|
| Gaon Physical Album Sales Chart | 58,175 |

=== BLAQ% Ver. ===
==== Album chart ====
| Chart | Peak position |
|---|---|
| Gaon Weekly album chart | 4 |

==== Single chart ====
| Song | Peak chart position | |
| Song | KOR | KOR |
| Song | Gaon Chart | K-Pop Billboard |
|---|---|---|
| "100%" | 30 | 36 |

==== Sales and certifications ====
| Chart | Amount |
|---|---|
| Gaon Physical Album Sales Chart | 23,300 |

== Release history ==
| Country | Date | Format | Label |
|---|---|---|---|
| South Korea | January 10, 2012 | Digital download | J.Tune Camp |
| South Korea | January 13, 2012 | CD | J.Tune Camp |
| South Korea | March 21, 2012 | Digital download (Special version) | J.Tune Camp |
