= BLAQ Style =

Studio album by MBLAQ
- Released: January 10, 2011
- Recorded: 2010
- Genre: K-pop, pop, dance, R&B
- Length: 42:49; 51:57 (3D Edition)
- Language: Korean
- Label: J. Tune Camp

MBLAQ chronology
MBLAQ Taiwan Special Edition Album (2010)	BLAQ Style (2011)	Mona Lisa (2011)

Singles from BLAQ Style
- 1. "Cry" Released: January 3, 2011; 2. "Stay" Released: January 10, 2011 (Promotional single)

Alternative cover

Singles from BLAQ Style – 3D Edition
- 1. "Again" Released: February 22, 2011 (Promotional single)

BLAQ Style is the first full-length album by South Korean boy band MBLAQ, and was released by J.Tune Camp on January 10, 2011, at 11 AM KST. MBLAQ's title songs will include "Stay" and "Cry". A re-release of the album, retitled BLAQ Style - 3D Edition, was released on February 22, 2011. Consisting a total of 16 tracks, the album contains the 13 tracks from BLAQ Style, as well as 3 new tracks. Two of the three new tracks included MBLAQ's participation in its production. The track "돌아올 수 없는 (Can't Come Back)" was composed by G.O and the lyrics were written by Mir, while the song titled You was written and composed by Cheon Doong.

Included in the repackage is the CD containing all 16 tracks, and a DVD consisting of the music videos of "Stay" and "Cry", as well as a 'making of' video.

When it was released, 3D Edition topped the Hanteo charts and MBLAQ's song "Again" was used to promote The Fighter in South Korea.

== Track listing ==
BLAQ Style track list

No.	Title	Lyrics	Music	Arrangement	Length
1.	"Sad Memories" (Intro)		Seungho	Park Se-hyun	1:40
2.	"Stay"	Rado, Ji-in, Won-taek and Gilme	Rado, Ji-in and Won-taek	Rado	3:20
3.	"Cry"	E-Tribe	E-Tribe	E-Tribe & Lee Chi-woo	3:47
4.	"Darling" (그대여; Geudaeyeo)	Rain	Rain, Bae Jin-ryul (JR Groove)	Bae Jin-ryul	3:13
5.	"Throw Away" (버린다; Beorinda)	Bae Jin-ryul	Bae Jin-ryul & Choi Ji-young	Bae Jin-ryul	3:25
6.	"Rust" (녹; Nok)	Ji-in & Won-taek	Ji-in & Won-taek	Ji-in	3:54
7.	"Tonight"	Bae Jin-ryul	Lee Jae-myung	Lee Jae-myung & Jo Sung-gwang	3:53
8.	"Wish You Hadn't" (이러지 않았으면 해; Ireoji anhateumyeon hae)	Bae Jin-ryul	Bae Jin-ryul & Choi Ji-young	Bae Jin-ryul & Choi Ji-young	3:25
9.	"You're My +"	Rado, Ji-in, Won-taek, Mir	Rado, Ji-in & Won-taek	Rado & Ji-in	3:51
10.	"Rolling U"	Bae Jin-ryul	Bae Jin-ryul	Bae Jin-ryul	3:30
11.	"Oh Yeah" (C-Luv & Blue Magic Remix)	Rain	Rain, Kim Tae-hwan, Jang Jae-min (Groove Network)	Blue Magic	4:41
12.	"Y" (JR GROOVE Remix)	Rain	Rain, Bae Jin-ryul		3:29
13.	"A Different Beginning" (또다른 시작; Ttodareun sijak)	Bae Jin-ryul	Bae Jin-ryul	Bae Jin-ryul	0:41
Total length:					42:49

BLAQ Style – 3D edition track list

No.	Title	Lyrics	Music	Arrangement	Length
1.	"Sad Memories" (Intro)		Seungho	Park Se-hyun	1:40
2.	"Again" (다시; Dasi)	C-Luv & Blue Magic	C-Luv & Lee Yong-hak	C-Luv	3:02
3.	"Can't Come Back" (돌아올 수 없는; Doraol su eobneun)	Mir	G.O	Rado	3:22
4.	"You"	Thunder	Thunder	C-Luv	3:33
5.	"Stay"	Rado, Ji-in, Won-taek and Gilme	Rado, Ji-in and Won-taek	Rado	3:20
6.	"Cry"	E-Tribe	E-Tribe	E-Tribe & Lee Chi-woo	3:47
7.	"Darling" (그대여; Geudaeyeo)	Rain	Rain, Bae Jin-ryul	Bae Jin-ryul	3:13
8.	"Throw Away" (버린다; Beorinda)	Bae Jin-ryul	Bae Jin-ryul & Choi Ji-young	Bae Jin-ryul	3:25
9.	"Rust" (녹; Nog)	Ji-in & Won-taek	Ji-in & Won-taek	Ji-in	3:54
10.	"Tonight"	Bae Jin-ryul	Lee Jae-young	Lee Jae-young & Jo Sung-gwang	3:53
11.	"Hope It Won't Be Like This" (이러지 않았으면 해; Ireoji anhasseumyeonhae)	Bae Jin-ryul	Bae Jin-ryul & Choi Ji-young	Bae Jin-ryul & Choi Ji-young	3:25
12.	"You're My +"	Rado, Ji-in, Won-taek, Mir	Rado, Ji-in & Won-taek	Rado & Ji-in	3:51
13.	"Rolling U"	Bae Jin-ryul	Bae Jin-ryul	Bae Jin-ryul	3:30
14.	"Oh Yeah" (C-Luv & Blue Magic Remix)	Rain	Rain, Kim Tae-hwan, Jang Jae-min	Blue Magic	4:41
15.	"Y" (JR GROOVE Remix)	Rain	Rain & Bae Jin-ryul		3:29
16.	"A Different Beginning (Outro)" (또다른 시작; Ttodareun sijag)	Bae Jin-ryul	Bae Jin-ryul	Bae Jin-ryul	0:41
Total length:					51:57

DVD
No.	Title	Length
1.	"Cry" (Music video)
2.	"Stay" (Music video)
3.	"Making the 'BLAQ Style'"

== Music videos ==
Prior to the release of the full MV for Cry, a teaser MV was released on December 29, 2010. The full MV for Cry was then released at 11am KST on January 3, 2011. On January 10, two MV teasers for Stay were released prior to the release of the full MV on January 11.

== Charts ==
=== BLAQ Style ===
Chart	Peak position
Gaon Weekly album chart	2
Gaon Monthly album chart	3
Gaon Yearly album chart	45

==== Single chart ====
Song	Peak position
Song	Gaon Chart
"Cry"	20
"Stay"	16

==== Sales and certifications ====
Chart	Amount
Gaon physical sales	31,634

=== BLAQ Style - 3D Edition ===
Chart	Peak position
Gaon Weekly album chart	3
Gaon Monthly album chart	9
Gaon Yearly album chart	83

==== Single chart ====
Song	Peak position
Song	Gaon Chart
"Again"	23

==== Sales and certifications ====
Chart	Amount
Gaon physical sales	18,533
