= Yang Seung-ho =

South Korean singer

Seungho 승호 양승호
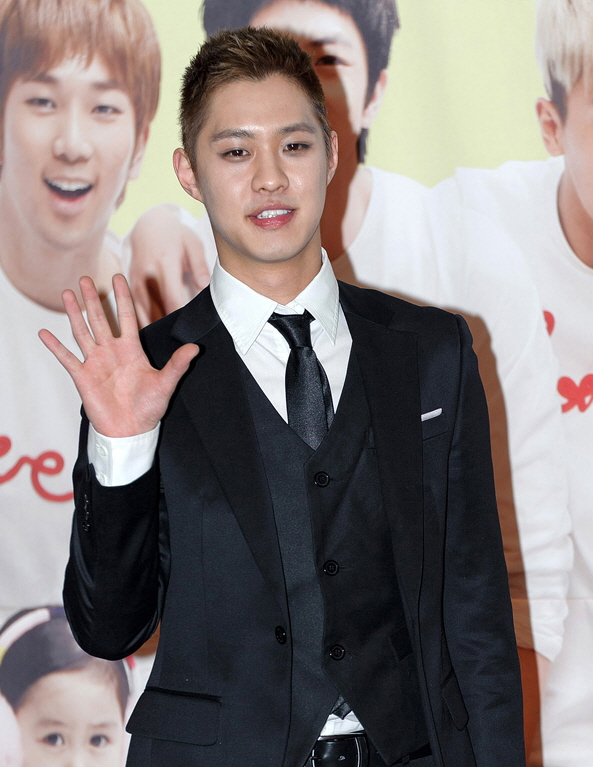
- Yang in 2012

Background information
- Born: Yang Seung-ho; October 16, 1987 (age 38); Seoul, South Korea
- Genre: K-pop
- Occupations: Singer, dancer, actor
- Instruments: Vocals, piano, guitar
- Years active: 2009–present
- Label: Alomalo Humane Entertainment
- Member of: MBLAQ
- Website: MBLAQ's official website

- Yang Seung-ho
- Hangul: 양승호
- RR: Yang Seungho
- MR: Yang Sŭngho

Yang Seung-ho (Korean: 양승호; born October 16, 1987), also known as Seungho, is a South Korean idol singer, dancer, actor, and the leader of South Korean boy band MBLAQ, currently active in South Korea under Will Entertainment.

== Career ==
=== Pre-debut ===
When Yang was young, he won a couple of singing contests that he joined. In addition, he had a television appearance in Sharp 1 (반올림1; Banolim 1) as a cameo in between 2003 and 2005. He was also featured in its soundtrack entitled "Gray Sky" by Lee Hyun-jung.

=== MBLAQ ===
After training under Rain and J. Tune Entertainment, Yang became a member of South Korean quintet boy band MBLAQ, serving as their leader, lead dancer and vocalist. The group made their unofficial debut on October 9, 2009, and officially debut on October 15, 2009, during Rain's Legend of Rainism concert, where they performed various songs from their then-unreleased single album Just BLAQ. Their performance that day was met with praise, with many concert spectators and fans considering them to be the next TVXQ.

MBLAQ's first single, "Oh Yeah", was released to the public through a music video on October 14, 2009, together with their debut single album, Just BLAQ. Afterwards, they had their broadcast debut on Mnet's M! Countdown, performing their single. The group also made their Japanese debut on May 3, 2011. They held an event at the Kanagawa Lazona Kawasaki Plaza, which gathered a reported 10,000 fans. A day later, on May 4, they released their first Japanese album Your Luv. The album immediately reached first position at the Oricon Daily Charts, selling more than 11,000 copies.

The group has starred in various South Korean variety shows as guests. They also had their own variety shows such as Mnet's MBLAQ – The Art of Seduction, MBC's MBLAQ's Idol Army, Mnet's Sesame Player and KBS's Hello Baby Season 5.

Since their debut, MBLAQ has released three single albums, six extended play albums, one studio album, one repackaged studio album, and two EPs in Korean. They also released one compilation album, four singles and four DVDs in Japanese.

=== Actor ===
On April 25, 2017, Yang signed a contract with Will Entertainment to start afresh as an actor. At Will Entertainment, Yang will not only act, but also release music and actively promote himself in various ways.

=== Other activities ===
Besides the group activities, Yang also guests on various television shows as a solo artist as well. These include Super Junior Miracle, Idol Maknae Rebellion, Kara Bakery, and Running Man, among others.

== Personal life ==
Yang Seung-ho was born on October 16, 1987, in Seoul. His family consists of a mother, a father, and a younger brother. When he was young, his family moved to Anyang, Gyeonggi and was raised there. He attended Anyang High School of Arts. After high school, he enrolled at the Sejong University of Film Arts but left afterwards due to MBLAQ's busy schedule. He now attends Kyung Hee Cyber University.

Yang is the only member in the group who uses his real name; his stage name was originally intended to be "Mir" but he rejected it.

== Discography ==
=== Collaborations ===
Year	Album	Song title	Artist
2010	One	"One"	with Hoody H

=== Writing credits ===
All song credits are adapted from the Korea Music Copyright Association's database.

Year	Artist	Album	Song
2011	MBLAQ	BLAQ Style	"Sad Memories"
2014	MBLAQ	Winter	"Live in the Past"
2014	MBLAQ	Winter	"You Ain't Know"
2016	Retro Funkee	Seoul	"Tinsel Town"

=== Soundtrack appearances ===
Year	Title		Album		Notes
Year	English	Hangul	English	Hangul	Notes
2006	"Gray Sky"	N/A	Sharp 3 OST	반올림3 OST	with 이현종
2016	"Say You Love Me"	사랑한다고 말해요	Happy Home OST	가화만사성 OST Part 4	

== Filmography ==
=== Televisions ===
Year	Network	Title	Notes
2009	Mnet	MBLAQ's Art of Seduction	Cast member
2009	MBC Every 1	Idol Army	Cast member
2010	GOMTV	Making the Artist	Cast member
2010	Mnet	MBLAQ Goes To School	Cast member
2011	Mnet	Sesame Player	Cast member
2011	Mnet	MBLAQ Idol Cam	Cast member
2012	KBS	MBLAQ's Hello Baby	Cast member
2012	MBC	Idol Manager	Cast member
2012	MBC	Dancing with the Stars	Contestant

=== Film ===
Year	Title	Role	Notes
2017	Rock N Roll Grandpa	Gi Ho-Tae	Lead role

=== Dramas ===
Year	Network	Title	Role	Notes
2006	KBS 2	Sharp 3	Student	Pre-debut
2010	MBC	Housewife Kim Kwang-ja's Third Activities	Jin's group member	Cameo
2011	SBS	Welcome to the Show	Himself	Cameo
2011	Mnet	Moon Night 90	Kang Won Rae	
2013	MBC Every 1	The Dramatic	Student	

=== Musical theatre ===
Year	Title	Period	Location	Role
2013	Gwanghwamun Sonata	Nov 17–22 – Jan 16–20	Shinkabukiza, Osaka	Kang HyunWoo
2014	Moon Night	02/21 – 03/23	Sejong Art Center, South Korea	Kim WooHyuk
2016 - 2017	Love in the Rain	August 5, 2016 – February 5, 2017	Dongyang Art Center, South Korea	Jung DongHyun
2020	Another Miss Oh	March, 2020 – June 4, 2020	Seokyeong University’s Performing Arts Center, South Korea	Park DoKyung
