= Lee Joon =

South Korean actor (born 1988)

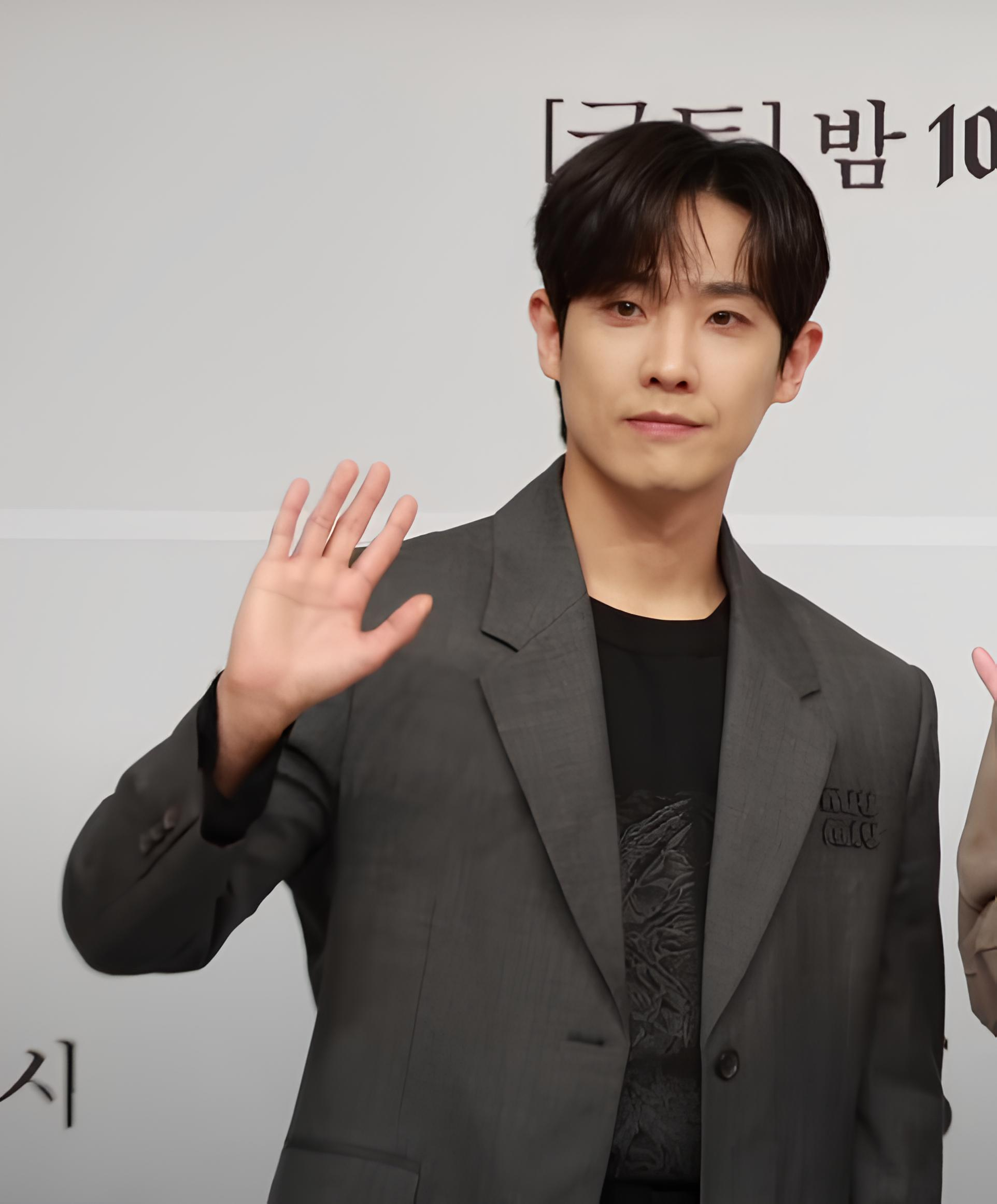
- Lee in March 2024
- Born: Lee Chang-sun; February 7, 1988 (age 38); Seoul, South Korea
- Education: Korea National University of Arts – Modern dance; Kyung Hee Cyber University
- Occupations: Actor; singer
- Years active: 2008–present
- Agent: Prain TPC
- Musical career
- Genre: K-pop
- Instrument: Vocals
- Years active: 2009–2014
- Label: J. Tune Camp
- Formerly of: MBLAQ

Korean name
- Hangul: 이창선
- Hanja: 李昌宣
- RR: I Changseon
- MR: I Ch'angsŏn

Stage name
- Hangul: 이준
- Hanja: 李準
- RR: I Jun
- MR: I Chun

Lee Chang-sun (Korean: 이창선; born February 7, 1988), known professionally as Lee Joon (Korean: 이준), is a South Korean actor, singer, model and DJ. He is best known as a former member of the South Korean boy band MBLAQ. He had notable roles in Gapdong (2014), My Father Is Strange (2017), The Silent Sea (2021), and Bulgasal (2021). He is currently a cast member of 2 Days & 1 Night and the host of the YouTube web series Workman.

== Career ==
=== Beginnings ===
Before becoming a part of MBLAQ, Lee acted in CFs, had a small non-recurring role in the first episode of the sitcom That Person Is Coming (그분이 오신다), which aired in 2008, and began and completed filming for the 2009 film, Ninja Assassin in which he portrayed the Teenage Raizo.

=== Music career ===
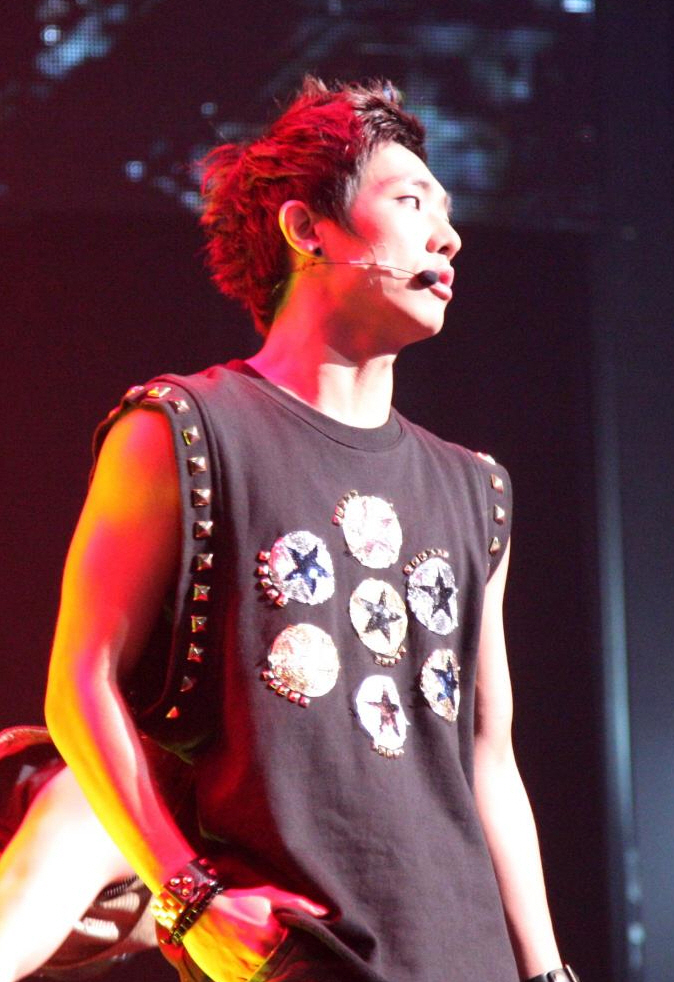
Lee on stage

After training under Rain and J. Tune Entertainment, Lee became a member of South Korean quintet boyband MBLAQ, serving as a vocalist and main dancer. The group debuted on October 9, 2009 at Rain's Legend of Rainism concert where they performed various songs from their then-unreleased single album Just BLAQ. MBLAQ's first single, "Oh Yeah", was released to the public through a music video on October 14, 2009 with their debut single album, Just BLAQ releasing on the same day. MBLAQ made their broadcast debut with the song "Oh Yeah" on Mnet's M! Countdown.

MBLAQ made their Japanese debut on May 3, 2011, with an event held at the Kanagawa Lazona Kawasaki Plaza which gathered a reported 10,000 fans. A day later, on May 4, they released their first Japanese single "Your Luv" which immediately reached first position of the Oricon Daily Charts, selling more than 11,000 copies.

With MBLAQ, he released three single albums, seven EPs and one studio album. He left the group in October 2014.

On October 18, 2017 ahead of his mandatory military enlistment Lee released his first solo digital single, "What I Want to Give to You", a pop ballad song written by his former MBLAQ band-mate Thunder.

=== Acting career ===
In 2010, he was cast in Jungle Fish 2, a youth drama which tackles real life issues about students. He participated in the OST for Jungle Fish 2, singing the song "슬픈예감 (Feeling Sad)" with Hong Jong-hyun.

In 2011, Lee lent his voice for the Korean dub of the film Gnomeo & Juliet.

In 2012 he was cast in Iris II, the sequel to the espionage series Iris. The same year, he joined the variety show, We Got Married where he was paired up with Oh Yeon-seo in an on-screen marriage.

In 2013, Lee starred in the film Rough Play, produced by Kim Kiduk. The film was unusually risque for a pop idol due to the numerous nude sex scenes he had to perform in it. He won the Best Male Newcomer award at the 1st Wildflower Film Awards for his performance, and was also nominated for the Best New Actor award at the 50th Baeksang Arts Awards and the 23rd Buil Film Awards.

In 2014, Lee had roles in the crime thriller Gap-dong and romance comedy fantasy drama Mr. Back.

In 2015, Lee starred in SBS' black comedy drama Heard It Through the Grapevine, winning accolades at the 8th Korea Drama Awards and 4th APAN Star Awards for his performance. In the same year, he was signed to Prain TPC.

The same year, he featured in the period mystery film The Piper; and lent his voice to the animated zombie film, Seoul Station.

In 2016, Lee starred in OCN's fantasy thriller The Vampire Detective as the title role. The same year, he had a supporting role in MBC's legal drama Woman with a Suitcase. He also co-starred in the action comedy film, Luck Key.

In 2017, Lee Joon starred in KBS2's weekend family drama, My Father Is Strange.

In 2021, Lee starred in Netflix Original series The Silent Sea. In the same year, Lee starred in tvN/Netflix fantasy series Bulgasal: Immortal Souls.

In 2022, Lee starred in KBS2' s historical drama Bloody Heart. In Bloody Heart, Lee played the role of Lee Tae who becomes King of Joseon. In same year, Lee Joon held the '2022 Lee Joon Busan Fan Camp' at Busan Metropolitan City's Arpina, Haeundae-gu, Busan.

In 2023, Lee stars in SBS’s picaresque revenge drama The Escape of the Seven. In The Escape of the Seven Lee plays the role of Min Do Hyuk who used to be a gangster whose life is filled with a series of betrayals. It was announced that Lee reprises his role in the second season.

=== Radio career ===
In 2019, Lee Joon started hosting the radio show Lee Joon's Youngstreet as Joon Haeng Ja on SBS Power FM.

== Personal life ==
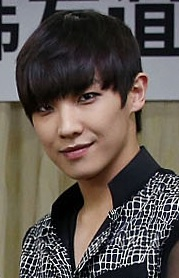
Lee in 2013

Lee Joon was born and raised in Seoul, South Korea, and has an older sister. He won second place in a dance competition and thus won a scholarship to Seoul Arts High School. He majored in modern dance at the Korea National University of Arts and attended Kyung Hee Cyber University. Lee has stated that he was diagnosed with bipolar disorder.

=== Military service ===
Lee began his mandatory military service as an active duty soldier on October 24, 2017, attending a five-week basic training in Pocheon, Gyeonggi Province. Lee completed his training first among 183 comrades. He was assigned to 8th Battalion to complete his duty.

Due to suffering with panic disorder while carrying out his military duties, Lee was deemed inadequate to serve as an active duty soldier, and was transferred to reservist duty. Lee completed his remaining mandatory duty as a public service officer. He was discharged on December 19, 2019.

== Discography ==
=== Singles ===
==== As lead artist ====
Title	Year	Album
"What I Wanna Give" (내가주고싶은건)	2017	Non-album single

==== As featured artist ====
Title	Year	Album
"Run away" (Featuring Vision Wei and Thunder)	2011	Daybreak (破晓)
"Do You Remember" (Featuring Mir of MBLAQ and Kim Jo Han)	2012	Non-album single
"Will You Marry Me? (너, 나, 우리)" (Jung Yonghwa Featuring Yoon Doo-joon of Highlight, Lee Joon, and Hwang Kwanghee)	2020	Reply Project

=== Soundtrack appearances ===
Title	Year	Album
"Feeling Sad" (슬픈예감)(with Hong Jong-hyun)	2010	Jungle Fish 2 OST
"Feeling Sad (Farewell Ver.)" (with Hong Jong-hyun, Kim Bo-ra, Shin So-yul and Han Ji-woo	2010	Jungle Fish 2 OST
"You & I" (유앤아이) (with G.O and Seung-ho)	2011	Scent of a Woman OST

== Filmography ==
=== Film ===
Year	Title	Role	Notes	Ref.
2009	Ninja Assassin	Teenage Raizo		
2011	Gnomeo & Juliet	Gnomeo	Voice-over for the Korean-dubbed version	
2013	Rough Play	Oh Young		
2015	The Piper	Nam-soo		
2015	Seoul Station	Ki-woong	Voice	
2016	Luck Key	Jae-sung		

=== Television series ===
Year	Title	Role	Notes	Ref.
2008	That Person Is Coming	Student	Cameo (Ep 1)	
2010	Jungle Fish 2	Ahn Ba-woo		
2010	KBS Drama Special "Housewife Kim Kwang Ja's 3rd Activities"	Jin		
2012	History of a Salaryman	Yeo-chi's boyfriend	Cameo (Ep 1)	
2012	Sent from Heaven	Lee Joon		
2012	Phantom	Passerby	Cameo (Ep 1)	
2013	Iris II: New Generation	Yoon Shi-hyuk		
2014	Gap-dong	Ryu Tae-oh		
2014	Mr. Back	Choi Dae-han		
2015	KBS Drama Special "What is the Ghost Up To?"	Goo Cheon-dong		
2015	Pinocchio	Fama	Cameo (Ep 19)	
2015	Heard It Through the Grapevine	Han In-sang		
2016	The Vampire Detective	Yoon San		
2016	Woman with a Suitcase	Ma Suk-woo		
2017	Mia Luang	Himself	Cameo (Ep 6)	
2017	My Father Is Strange	Ahn Joong-hee		
2021–2022	Bulgasal: Immortal Souls	Ok Eul-tae		
2022	Bloody Heart	Lee Tae		
2023–2024	The Escape of the Seven	Min Do-hyuk	Season 1–2	
2024	My Sweet Mobster	Goo Jun-gyung	Cameo (Ep 9)	

=== Web series ===
Year	Title	Role	Ref.
2021	The Silent Sea	Ryu Tae-seok	

=== Audio dramas ===
Year	Title	Role	Ref.
2022	I Want to Hurt	Cha Do-yoon	

=== Television shows ===
Year	Title	Role	Notes	Ref.
2010	M Countdown	Rotating host	with Nichkhun, Lee Jun-ho, Hwang Chan-sung, Jo Kwon, Jeong Jin-woon, Kang Min-hyuk, and G.O	
2012	Exploring Men and Women	Main cast		
2012–2013	We Got Married (season 4)	Main cast	with Oh Yeon-seo	
2024–present	2 Days & 1 Night	Main cast	Episode 237–present	
2025–present	Workman	Host		

== Theater ==
Year	Title	Role	Ref.
2025	Oseisa (lit.)	Toru	

== Awards and nominations ==
Year	Award	Category	Nominated work	Result	Ref.
2014	7th Korea Drama Awards	Best New Actor	Gap-dong	Nominated	
2014	1st Wildflower Film Awards	Best Actor	Rough Play	Nominated	
2014	1st Wildflower Film Awards	Best New Actor	Rough Play	Won	
2014	50th Baeksang Arts Awards	Best New Actor (Film)	Rough Play	Nominated	
2014	23rd Buil Film Awards	Best New Actor	Rough Play	Nominated	
2014	MBC Drama Awards	Best New Actor	Mr. Back	Nominated	
2015	51st Baeksang Arts Awards	Best New Actor (TV)	Heard It Through the Grapevine	Nominated	
2015	8th Korea Drama Awards	Excellence Award, Actor	Heard It Through the Grapevine	Won	
2015	4th APAN Star Awards	Excellence Award, Actor in a Serial Drama	Heard It Through the Grapevine	Won	
2015	Scene Stealer Festival	Youngest Scene Stealer	—N/a	Won	
2015	SBS Drama Awards	Best Couple Award (with Go Ah-sung)	Heard It Through the Grapevine	Nominated	
2016	MBC Drama Awards	Excellence Award, Actor in a Special Project Drama	Woman with a Suitcase	Nominated	
2017	KBS Drama Awards	Excellence Award, Actor in a Serial Drama	My Father Is Strange	Nominated	
2022	KBS Drama Awards	Excellence Award, Actor in a Miniseries	Bloody Heart	Won	
2022	KBS Drama Awards	Popularity Award, Actor	Bloody Heart	Nominated	
2022	KBS Drama Awards	Best Couple	Lee Joon (with Kang Han-na); Bloody Heart	Won	
2023	SBS Drama Awards	Excellence Award, Actor in a Miniseries Genre/Action Drama	The Escape of the Seven	Won	
2025	KBS Entertainment Awards	Top Excellence Award (Show/Variety)	2 Days & 1 Night	Won	
