= Broken (MBLAQ EP) =

EP by MBLAQ
- Released: March 24, 2014 (South Korea)
- Recorded: 2013–2014
- Genres: K-pop, dance, ballad
- Length: 19:23
- Language: Korean
- Label: J. Tune Camp

MBLAQ chronology
Sexy Beat (2013)	Broken (2014)	Winter (2014)

Singles from Broken
- 1. "Our Relationship" Released: March 16, 2014; 2. "Be a Man" Released: March 24, 2014

Broken is the sixth EP released by the South Korean boy group MBLAQ. The album was released online on March 24, 2014 at 12PM (KST). The album consists of 7 tracks, and Wheesung took part in the writing of the lyrics and composing for the title song Be a Man, whereby he gifted the song to MBLAQ. He expressed that "MBLAQ is the only male group that I wanted to give a song to, so it was a pleasure to work with them on the album. I am thankful for MBLAQ for conveying the feelings that I wanted from this track".

== Concept ==
The concept shows the members' chic and strong 'masculine' mature image. Filter imitating broken glass overlaid by the members' images, which are included in the concept photos, were uploaded on the official MBLAQ's SNS and creates a rainbow set of colours. This is in contrast to the meaning of the album's name, Broken, whereby it shows how a heart can grow cold when broken, as portrayed by the members' angry and hard gazes.

== Background ==
On March 20 at 12AM (KST), MBLAQ released their teaser of "Be a Man" on their official YouTube channel, J.Tune Camp. It shows the sleek and sophisticated images of the members, as they wore well-tailored black and white suits together with clean-cut hair, appearing mysterious with their sharp gaze. It further dramatizes the video through the added fog and shadow effects.

== Track listing ==
No.	Title	Lyrics	Music	Arrangement	Length
1.	"Broken (Intro)"	Cheondung, Super Cheongdam	Cheondung, Super Cheongdam	Super Cheongdam	1:26
2.	"Be a Man"	Wheesung, Mir	Wheesung, Lee Ki, Youngbae	Lee Ki, Youngbae	3:22
3.	"Between Us" (우리 사이; Uri Sai)	S Kim, Mir	S Kim	Bukgeukgom	3:07
4.	"12 Months" (12개월; 12 Gaewol)	Cheondung, Super Cheongdam, Mir	Cheondung, Super Cheongdam	Super Cheongdam	3:16
5.	"Key" (열쇠; Yeolsoe)	Duble Sidekick, David Kim	Tenjo, Tasco	Tenjo, Tasco	3:44
6.	"Because There are Two" (둘이라서; Duriraseo)	G.O, Avengers, Mir	G.O, Avengers, Radio Galaxy	Radio Galaxy	4:04
7.	"Still With You (Outro)"	G.O, Avengers	G.O, Avengers		0:58
Total length:					19:23

== Chart performance ==
=== Album chart ===
Chart	Peak position
Gaon Weekly album chart	1
Gaon Monthly album chart	8

=== Single chart ===
Song	Peak position	
Song	KOR	KOR
Song	Gaon Chart	K-Pop Billboard
"Be a Man"	20	9

==== Sales and certifications ====
Chart	Amount
Gaon physical album sales	20, 252

== Release history ==
Country	Date	Format	Label
South Korea	March 24, 2014	Digital download	J.Tune Camp CJ E&M Music
South Korea	March 26, 2014	CD	J.Tune Camp CJ E&M Music
