= Rock N Roll Grandpa =

- Directed by: Lee Jang-hee
- Starring: Yang Seung-ho; Ha eun-seol; singer Yoon Soo-il; Oh Kwang-rok; Lee Chae-mi
- Release date: 2016
- Country: South Korea
- Language: Korean

Rock N Roll Grandpa(로큰롤할배) is a 2016 Korean film, directed by Lee Jang-hee. The film portrays a boy full of dreams who rekindles an old man's passion. It stars Yang Seung-ho, Ha eun-seol, Oh Kwang-rok, and more.

The film marked Yang's screen debut. and It was screened at the 2018 Jecheon festival.

== Cast ==
- Yang Seung-ho as Gi Ho-tae
  Gi Ho-tae is a bright and confident 20-year-old Kee Ho-tae, who calls himself a 'voluntary applicant for temporary position' and works at a refrigerated warehouse. He has many dreams, and he is voluntarily working at this difficult job to follow his dreams. He meets an old man who lost all his dreams, and they hope to improve their lives, all the while communicating with each other through music.
- Ha eun-seol
- Oh Kwang-rok
- Yoon Soo-il
- Lee Chae-mi
