= Y (EP) =

EP by MBLAQ
- Released: May 17, 2010 (South Korea)
- Recorded: 2009
- Genre: K-pop, dance
- Length: 19:50
- Language: Korean
- Label: J. Tune Camp
- Producer: Rain, C-Luv

MBLAQ chronology
Just BLAQ (2009)	Y (2010)	MBLAQ Taiwan Special Edition Album (2010)

Singles from Y
- 1. "Y" Released: May 17, 2010

Y is the second EP by South Korean boy band MBLAQ, and was released through J.Tune Entertainment South Korea on May 17, 2010. The only single "Y" was released to Korean music portals on the same date as the EP release. The album is labeled as a "single-album" (single or maxi single) in Korea, however, the album falls into the category of an EP (extended play or mini album), and technically does not qualify as a single.

== Track listing ==
No.	Title	Lyrics	Music	Arrangement	Length
1.	"4 Ya' Stereo" (Feat. C-Luv, Seungho (beatboxing))	C-Luv	Groove Network (C-Luv, Park Se-hyun, Jang Jae-min)	Groove Network (C-Luv, Park Se-hyun, Jang Jae-min)	1:20
2.	"Y"	Rain	Rain, Bae Jin-ryul (JR Groove)	Bae Jin-ryul (JR Groove)	3:31
3.	"One Better Day"	C-Luv	Groove Network (C-Luv, Park Se-hyun, Jang Jae-min)	Groove Network (C-Luv, Park Se-hyun, Jang Jae-min)	3:05
4.	"What U Want"	C-Luv	Groove Network (C-Luv, Park Se-hyun, Jang Jae-min)	Groove Network (C-Luv, Park Se-hyun, Jang Jae-min)	2:42
5.	"Last Luv"	C-Luv	Groove Network (C-Luv, Park Se-hyun, Jang Jae-min)	Groove Network (C-Luv, Park Se-hyun, Jang Jae-min)	3:38
6.	"Y (Instrumental)" (*Jung Ji-hun is not Rain, although they have the same Korean name.)		Jung Ji-hun	Bae Jin-ryul (JR Groove)	3:29
7.	"One Better Day (Instrumental)"		Groove Network (C-Luv, Park Se-hyun, Jang Jae-min)	Groove Network (C-Luv, Park Se-hyun, Jang Jae-min)	3:05
Total length:					19:50

== Music videos and singles ==
- "Y" was the only single to be released from the boys follow up EP. The teaser was officially released on 13 May 2010 in South Korea. The full music video was released at midnight on 19 May 2010. The boys received some back lash after Joon's character held a gun to his girlfriend and shot her in the music video. The boy's label responded with an apology, and a statement stating they would remove the scene.
- "One Better Day" was also performed during promotions for "Y". The boys officially started promoting "One Better Day" on 20 May 2010, back to back with "Y". The song was never released as a single, nor was a music video produced.
