= Winter (MBLAQ EP) =

EP by MBLAQ
- Released: November 25, 2014 (South Korea; online); November 26, 2014 (Offline)
- Recorded: 2014
- Genre: K-pop, dance, Ballad
- Length: 15:50
- Language: Korean
- Label: J. Tune Camp

MBLAQ chronology
Broken (2014)	Winter (2014)	Mirror (2015)

Singles from Winter
- 1. "Spring, Summer, Autumn And..." Released: November 25, 2014

Winter is the seventh EP released by the South Korean boy group MBLAQ, in time to suit the approaching Winter season. The album was released online on November 25, 2014 at 12AM (KST) and offline on November 26, 2014. The album consists of 5 tracks, and all the tracks included in the album are self-composed ballad songs by the members themselves.

It was the final album to feature members Lee Joon and Thunder before their departures one month later on December 16, 2014.

== Promotions ==
Although MBLAQ did not officially promote the album on music programs, they held a Curtain Call concert at Olympic Hall in Olympic Park from November 29 to November 30, 2014.

== Concept ==
The teaser images were released on MBLAQ's official website as well as J. Tune Camp's Facebook and Twitter. It showed the five members presenting themselves in black outfits from suits to knitted sweaters. As they did not stare into the camera directly, they exuded different kinds of emotions to match the winter atmosphere.

== Track listing ==
No.	Title	Lyrics	Music	Arrangement	Length
1.	"Live in the Past"		Seungho, Han Jaesung	Seungho, Han Jaesung	1:42
2.	"Spring, Summer, Autumn And..." (봄 여름 가을 그리고...; Bom yeoreum Gaeul Geurigo...)	G.O, Mir, Retro Funky	G.O, Retro Funky	G.O, Retro Funky	3:32
3.	"You Ain`t Know"	Seungho, Yang Seunghoon, Retro Funky	Seungho, Yang Seunghoon, Retro Funky	Seungho, Retro Funky	3:08
4.	"Words that Would Make It OK (Feat. Fiestar's Hyemi)" (괜찮을 거란 그 말; Gwanchanheul georan geu mal)	Cheondung, Super Cheongdam	Cheondung, Super Cheongdam	Super Cheongdam	3:28
5.	"Rust (Unplugged Ver.)" (녹 (Unplugged Ver.); Nog (Unplugged Ver.))	Bukgeukgom, Wontaek	Bukgeukgom, Wontaek	Bukgeukgom, Wontaek, Shinhyung	4:00
Total length:					15:50

== Chart performance ==
=== Album chart ===
Chart	Peak position
Gaon Weekly album chart	5
Gaon Monthly album chart	18

==== Sales and certifications ====
Chart	Amount
Gaon physical album sales	6,272

== Release history ==
Country	Date	Format	Label
South Korea	November 25, 2014	Digital download CD	J.Tune Camp CJ E&M Music
