= Baby U! =

Single by MBLAQ
- Released: October 26, 2011 (Japan)
- Recorded: 2011
- Genre: J-pop, pop, Dance
- Length: 4:01
- Label: Rise Communications, Sony Music Records
- Songwriters: MIZUE, Cheon Dung (Thunder), Zeenan

MBLAQ Japanese singles chronology
"Your Luv" (2011)	"Baby U!" (2011)

"Baby U!" is a song released by the South Korean boy band MBLAQ. It is the group's second Japanese single and it was released on October 26, 2011, via Sony Music Records Japan.

== Promotions ==
In September it was revealed that MBLAQ's new Japanese single will be used as the opening theme for the Japanese anime Beelzebub. The title of the single is Baby U, and it was released on October 26, 2011. Baby U! reached #2 on the Oricon Daily Chart on its release date, selling more than 22,000 copies. As part of their promotions, MBLAQ travelled to Nagoya on the 28th, Osaka on the 29th, and Tokyo on the 30th to celebrate the release of their new single. On October 30, 1500, fans were chosen by a lottery among the 12,500 people who gathered at the venue to join the LIVE performance and Great Bingo Tournament. On the final day, 23,000 fans gathered for a special 'High five' event, as well as performances.

== Track listing ==
No.	Title	Lyrics	Length
1.	"Baby U!"	MIZUE, Cheon Dung (Thunder)	4:01
2.	"Again"	Tamami Matsui	5:12
3.	"Your Luv" (Wasabii Remix)	Nept	3:09
4.	"Baby U!" (TV Mix)	MIZUE, Cheon Dung (Thunder)	1:31
Total length:			13:53

DVD (Limited Edition A)
No.	Title	Length
1.	"Baby U!" (Music video)

DVD (Limited Edition B)
No.	Title	Length
1.	"Off Shot Movie"

DVD (Limited Edition C)
No.	Title	Length
1.	"BLAQ Impact Vol.1" (Off Shot Movie)

== Charts ==
Baby U! reached #2 on the Oricon Weekly Chart, selling a total of 42,624 copies in the first week. The song also reached #1 on Japan's Billboard Hot Animation Chart. The group released the second single in Japan, "Baby U! 'Three days a week Oricon singles chart came in second. Agency, J. Tune camp thus convey the day, "released last month on the 26th day on the day at No. 2 on the Oricon weekly chart, followed in ohreunde maintain top," he said.The 'Baby U!' The Nippon TV series, animation, 'Beelzebub' opening song jaepaen sapipdwae Billboard's "Hot Animation 'category won a latitude. Japanese debut single last May before MBLAQ 'Juvenile Love (Your Luv)' to the Oricon singles ilganchateu has the No. 1 spot.

Oricon Chart	Peak	Debut Sales	Sales Total	Chart Run
Daily Singles Chart	2	42,624	44,000+	3 weeks
Weekly Singles Chart	2	42,624	44,000+	3 weeks
Monthly Singles Chart	14	42,624	44,000+	3 weeks
