= Mona Lisa (EP) =

EP by MBLAQ
- Released: July 12, 2011
- Recorded: 2011
- Genres: K-pop, dance
- Length: 20:27
- Language: Korean
- Label: J. Tune Camp

MBLAQ chronology
BLAQ Style - 3D Edition (2011)	Mona Lisa (2011)	100% Ver. (2012)

Singles from Mona Lisa
- 1. "Mona Lisa" Released: July 12, 2011; 2. "I Don't Know" Released: September 1, 2011 (Promotional single)

Mona Lisa (Korean: 모나리자) is an EP by South Korean boy band MBLAQ. The album was released online on July 12 and physically on July 15. The online pre-orders started on July 8, 2011. The album consists of six new tracks, and the title track, also called Mona Lisa is a Spanish electronic dance track.

== Concept ==
The concept features the members parodying famous historical figures; Seungho chose Papillon, G.O chose James Dean, Joon chose Zorro, Thunder chose Boy George, and Mir chose The Beatles.

== Promotions ==
The group started promoting the title track "Mona Lisa" starting July 14 on TV music shows such as Mnet's M! Countdown. The song "I Think You Know" was used for the comeback. They finished promoting the song on August 28 and followed with the song "I Don't Know" on September 1. The promotions of the song and the EP ended on September 11.

== Track listing ==
All the songs (except Ojos Frios) were written by Rado, Ji-in, Won-taek & DoK2, composed by Rado, Ji-in & Won-taek and arranged by Rado.

No.	Title	Music	Arrangement	Length
1.	"Ojos Frios" (Bandoneon by 고상지; Go Sang-ji)	Rado, Ji-in, Won-taek	Go Sang-ji	1:31
2.	"Mona Lisa" (모나리자)	Rado, Wontaek, Jiin, Dok2	Rado	3:41
3.	"I Don't Know" (모르겠어요; Moreugesseoyo)	Rado, Wontaek, Jiin, Dok2	Rado	3:34
4.	"I Think You Know" (알면서 그래; Almyeonseo Geurae)	Rado, Wontaek, Jiin, Dok2	Rado	3:37
5.	"One"	Rado, Wontaek, Jiin, Dok2	Rado	4:00
6.	"I Shouldn't Have Said It" (말하지 말걸..; Malhaji Malgeol..)	Rado, Wontaek, Jiin, Dok2	Jiin, Bahk Chulho	4:04
Total length:				20:27

== Charts ==
=== Album chart ===
Chart	Peak position
Gaon Weekly album chart	1
Gaon Monthly album chart	3
Gaon Yearly album chart	34

=== Single chart ===
Song	Peak chart position	
Song	KOR	KOR
Song	Gaon Chart	K-Pop Billboard
"Mona Lisa"	8	37
"I Don't Know"	138	-

=== Sales and certifications ===
Chart (2011)	Amount
Gaon physical sales	41,025

== Release history ==
Country	Date	Format	Label
South Korea	July 12, 2011	Digital download	J.Tune Camp
South Korea	July 15, 2011	CD	J.Tune Camp
