= BLAQ Memories =

BLAQ Memories - Best in Korea

Compilation album by MBLAQ
- Released: March 7, 2012
- Recorded: 2009–2012
- Genres: K-pop, pop, dance, R&B
- Length: 44:53
- Languages: Korean, Japanese
- Labels: J.Tune Camp & Sony Music Japan

MBLAQ chronology
100% Ver. (2012)	BLAQ Memories - Best in Korea (2012)

BLAQ Memories is a compilation album released for the Japanese market. The album consists of MBLAQ's Korean songs, as well as a Japanese version of "You're My +". The album was released on March 7, 2012. Upon its release, the album landed at #9 on the Oricon Daily chart

== Track listing ==
No.	Title	Lyrics	Music	Arrangement	Length
1.	"Sad Memories" (Intro)		Seungho	Park Se-hyun	1:40
2.	"Oh Yeah"	Rain	C-Luv	C-Luv	3:29
3.	"G.O.O.D Luv"	Rain	C-Luv	C-Luv	3:16
4.	"Y"	Rain	Rain, Bae Jin-ryul (JR Groove)	Bae Jin-ryul	3:31
5.	"Last Luv"	C-Luv	Groove Network (C-Luv, Park Se-hyun, Jang Jae-min)	Groove Network	3:38
6.	"Cry"	E-Tribe	E-Tribe	E-Tribe & Lee Chi-woo	3:47
7.	"Stay"	Rado, Ji-in, Won-taek and Gilmi	Rado, Ji-in and Won-taek	Rado	3:20
8.	"Can't Come Back" (돌아올 수 없는; Doraol su eobneun)	Mir	G.O	Rado	3:22
9.	"You"	Cheondung	Cheondung	C-Luv	3:33
10.	"You're My +"	Rado, Ji-in, Won-taek, Mir	Rado, Ji-in & Won-taek	Rado & Ji-in	3:51
11.	"Rust" (녹)	Ji-in & Won-taek	Ji-in & Won-taek	Ji-in	3:54
12.	"Mona Lisa" (모나리자)	Rado, Ji-in, Won-taek, DoK2	Rado, Ji-in, Won-taek	Rado	3:41
13.	"You're My +" (Japanese Version)	Rado, Ji-in, Won-taek, Mir	Rado, Ji-in & Won-taek	Rado & Ji-in	3:51
Total length:					44:53
