= Just BLAQ =

EP by MBLAQ
- Released: October 14, 2009 (South Korea)
- Recorded: 2009
- Genre: K-pop, Dance
- Length: 13:36
- Language: Korean
- Label: J. Tune Camp
- Producer: Rain

MBLAQ chronology
| Just BLAQ (2009) | "Y" (2010) |

Singles from Just BLAQ
- 1. "Oh Yeah" Released: October 13, 2009

Just BLAQ is the debut Korean EP by the South Korean boy group MBLAQ. The EP was released online on October 14, 2009. The debut single, "Oh Yeah" was released the same day to Korean music outlets. The song "G.O.O.D. Luv" was released as the EP's second promotional single. The album is labeled as a single-album (single or maxi single) in Korea, however, the album falls into the category of an EP (extended play or mini album), and technically does not qualify as a single.

== Track listing ==
| No. | Title | Lyrics | Music | Arrangement | Length |
|---|---|---|---|---|---|
| 1. | "Oh Yeah" (feat. Elly and Hyuna) | Rain | C-Luv | C-Luv | 3:29 |
| 2. | "G.O.O.D Luv" | Rain | C-Luv | C-Luv | 3:16 |
| 3. | "My Dream" | C-Luv | C-Luv | Jang Jae-min | 3:51 |
| 4. | "If You Come Into My Heart" (feat. C-Luv [Cover, also released on The Artist (Jo Deok-bae 25th Anniversary Album)]) | Jo Deok-bae | Jo Deok-bae | Jo Deok-bae | 3:00 |
| Total length: | | | | | 13:36 |

== Music videos and singles ==
- "Oh Yeah" was released officially on 14 October 2009. The music video was choreographed by producer and mentor, Rain. The boys performed a Japanese version of "Oh Yeah" during a promotional trip to Japan. The Japanese version was only sung live, and there is no word if a studio version exists or if there are any plans to release one.
- "G.O.O.D. Luv" is the single-album's official second single. During the film of MBLAQ's reality show "Mnet Art of Seduction", the boys took some time to make their "own" music video for the song. The video was filmed with television cameras and cam-cord cameras. An "official" music video for the single was released on 10 December 2009.
