= MBLAQ =

South Korean boy band

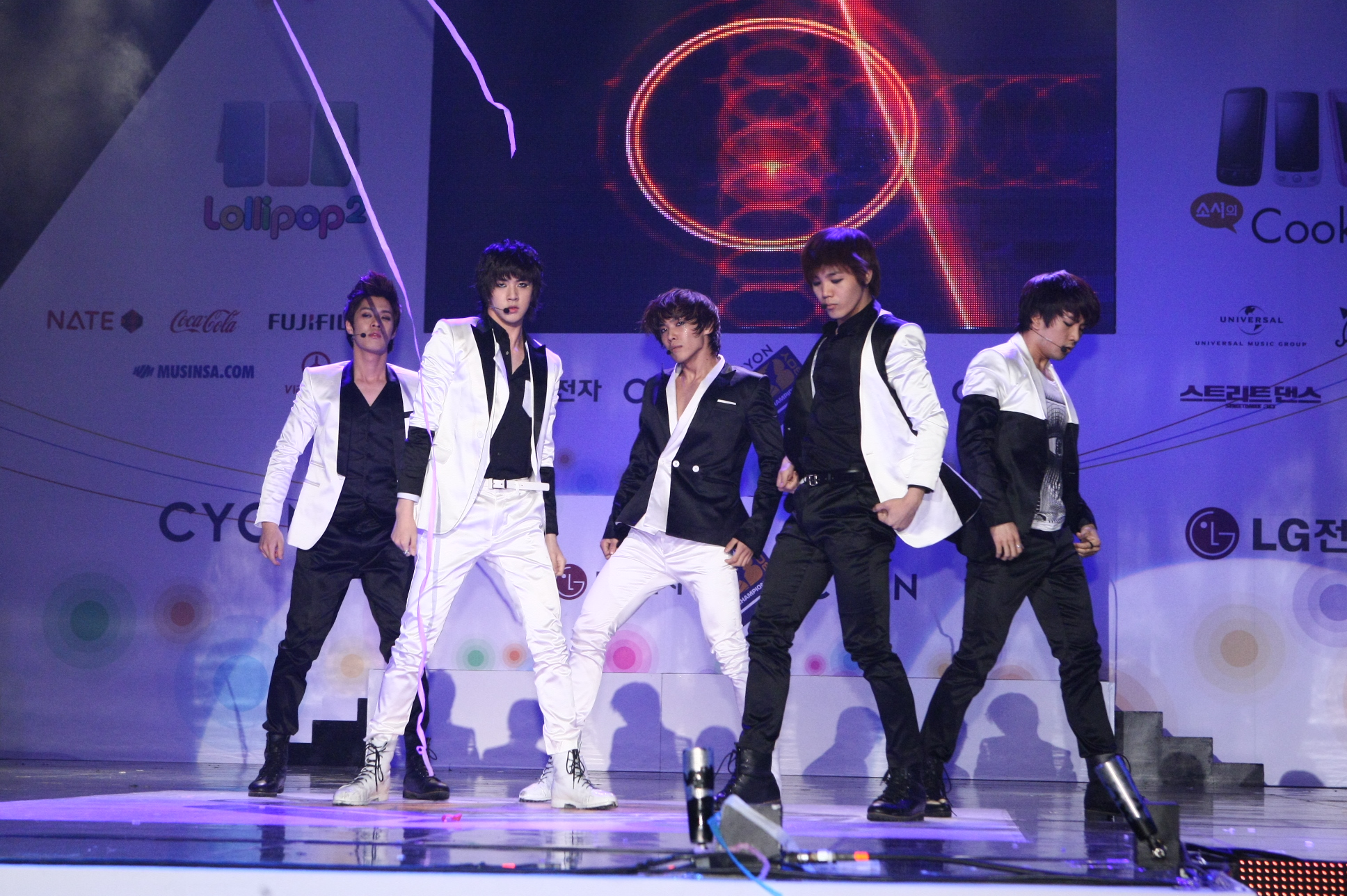
- MBLAQ in 2010 (L–R: Seungho, Thunder, Joon, Mir, G.O)

Background information
- Origin: South Korea
- Genres: K-pop; EDM; R&B
- Years active: 2009–2015 (Note: Indefinite hiatus)
- Labels: J. Tune Camp; gr8!
- Members: Seungho; G.O; Mir
- Past members: Lee Joon; Thunder

MBLAQ (Korean: 엠블랙, Japanese: エムブラック; an acronym for Music Boys Live in Absolute Quality) is a South Korean boy band created by South Korean singer Rain under J. Tune Camp. The group consists of Seungho, G.O, and Mir, and formerly Lee Joon and Thunder. The group debuted on October 15, 2009, at Rain's Legend of Rainism concert.

On October 14, 2009, the group released their debut single album, Just BLAQ, which topped various online and offline music charts in South Korea. The group then released their first extended play album Y on May 19, 2010, and on January 10, 2011, MBLAQ released their first studio album, BLAQ Style.

On December 16, 2014, it was announced Joon and Thunder had departed from the group and they will focus on individual activities for the time being.

== History ==
=== 2009: Just BLAQ ===
On September 21, 2009, J. Tune Camp announced that its new five-member boy group, MBLAQ, would make their first appearance in a photo spread for Nylon magazine in October. The group, composed of members Seungho, G.O, Mir, Lee Joon and Thunder, had reportedly trained for two years under the mentorship of singer and music producer Rain.

The group made their stage debut on October 9, opening for Rain at his Legend of Rainism concert in Seoul. On October 12, MBLAQ released a teaser video for their debut song, "Oh Yeah", which was released two days later as part of their debut extended play Just BLAQ. Upon its release, the extended play topped various music charts in South Korea. The next day, the group made their broadcast debut, performing "Oh Yeah" on M Countdown. Thunder later revealed in 2011 that, while he provided live vocals for the extended play's promotions, his voice does not appear on Just BLAQ, as he had joined the group only 15 days prior to its release.

In November, a reality series about the group, called MBLAQ - The Art of Seduction (Korean: MBLAQ 작업의 정석), aired on Mnet, garnering high viewership ratings.

On December 6, MBLAQ performed at Rain's fan meeting in Tokyo to promote their upcoming Japanese debut. The group began promotions for their second Korean single, "G.O.O.D Luv", on December 11. The group appeared as hosts of season five of the television series Idol Show starting on December 16.

=== 2010: Y ===
On May 17, 2010, the group released their second extended play, Y, featuring a lead single of the same name that was written and produced by Rain. "Y" reached number 5 on the Gaon Digital Chart, and the song claimed first place on M Countdown on June 3.

MBLAQ was featured on several reality television shows in 2010. The GomTV web series Making the Artist - MBLAQ followed the creation of the group's extended play Y. On the Mnet series Celebrities Go to School (Korean: 연예인 대학가기), the members audited college classes and experienced student life. And the Japanese documentary, Yo! Tokyo, showed the group discovering Japanese culture.

=== 2011: BLAQ Style, Japanese debut, and Mona Lisa ===
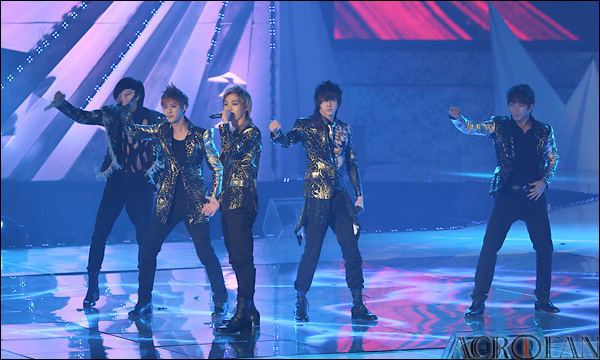
MBLAQ in 2011

On January 3, 2011, MBLAQ released "Cry", the pre-release single for their first full-length album. The album, BLAQ Style, was released on January 10, 2011, with the title track "Stay". Group member Seungho composed the album track "Sad Memories", while member Mir contributed lyrics to the track "You're My +". The album reached number 2 on the Gaon Album Chart.

A repackaged version of the album, titled BLAQ Style - 3D Edition, was released on February 22, 2011, with the title track "Again". In addition to "Again", the repackage includes the new tracks "Can't Come Back", which was written by Mir and G.O, and "You", which was written by Thunder. BLAQ Style - 3D Edition was released in Taiwan on March 18, 2011, and reached number one on G-Music's K-pop and J-pop album chart.

On May 4, 2011, the group released their first Japanese single, "Your Luv", which reached number 2 on Japan's weekly Oricon Singles Chart and sold more than 40,000 copies. They promoted the single with live performances in Osaka, Sapporo, Nagoya, Fukuoka and Tokyo.

MBLAQ released their third Korean extended play, Mona Lisa, on July 12, 2011. After the album reached 30,000 pre-order sales, J.Tune Camp announced that it would produce 50,000 more copies of the album to meet demand, particularly among Japanese fans. In South Korea, the album was the group's first number-one entry on the Gaon Album Chart, and its lead single, "Mona Lisa", topped online music video charts in Germany and Bulgaria.

The group released their second Japanese single, "Baby U!", on October 26, 2011. The song reached number 2 on the weekly Oricon Singles Chart, selling 45,624 copies in the first week of its release. MBLAQ promoted the single in Japan, with 23,000 fans attending a release event in Tokyo.

=== 2012: 100% Ver., BLAQ Memories, and first Asia tour ===
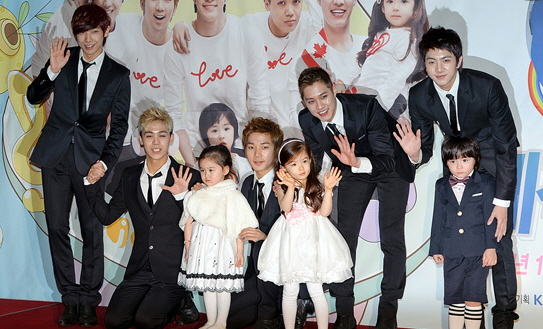
MBLAQ in 2012 at the Hello Baby press conference

On January 3, 2012, MBLAQ released the single "Scribble", which topped real-time music charts in South Korea. On January 10, the group released their fourth extended play, 100% Ver., which, in addition to "Scribble", includes the single "This Is War". The album sold more than 40,000 pre-ordered copies, and charted at number one on the Gaon Album Chart. On March 21, the group released BLAQ% Ver., a repackaged version of the album. The group promoted the repackage with the singles "Run" and "100%". Combined, the album and repackage sold more than 80,000 copies in 2012.

On January 19, the group joined the cast of season 5 of the reality show Hello Baby, on which they cared for children from multicultural families.

On March 7, MBLAQ released the compilation album BLAQ Memories in Japan. The album peaked at number 18 on the weekly Oricon Albums Chart. Later that month, the group made a cameo appearance on the television drama K-Pop Extreme Survival (Korean: K-팝 최강 서바이벌), which stars Mir's sister, Go Eun-ah.

In June, the group embarked on their first Asian tour, making stops in Indonesia, Thailand, Singapore, Japan and Taiwan, in addition to South Korea.

=== 2013: Sexy Beat & Love Beat ===
On May 28, a teaser video for 스모키걸 (Smoky Girl), the title track of their comeback album Sexy Beat, was uploaded onto J. Tune Camp's official YouTube channel. MBLAQ previously mentioned in behind the scenes video during a photo shot for Cosmopolitan Korea that they will be returning with the song Smoky Girl, described by member Mir as an addictive song with sexy choreography. Leader Seungho confirms in the video that MBLAQ will be making their comeback in the first week of June. On June 4, the music video for Smoky Girl was released online and MBLAQ held a comeback showcase on the same day as the release of the music video which was streamed live on various websites such as Mnet's Mwave. Sexy Beat, MBLAQ's fifth extended play was also released on June 4, which consists of six tracks with 스모키걸 (Smoky Girl) as their title track.

A repackaged special album titled Love Beat was released two months later on August 12, 2013. It consists of three new tracks: I Don't Know, Prayer (기도) and No Love as their title track, together with all six tracks from Sexy Beat. The music video for No Love was uploaded on J. Tune Camp's official YouTube channel on August 12, showing the photoshoot, composing and preparation for Love Beat.

=== 2014: Broken, Winter, Lee Joon and Thunder's departure ===
On March 20, 2014, at 12AM (KST), a teaser video for Be a Man, the title track of their comeback album Broken, was uploaded onto J. Tune Camp's official YouTube channel. On March 24, 2014, the music video of Be a Man was uploaded and the album which consists of seven tracks which the members actively participated in the writing and composing part, was subsequently released online at 12PM (KST). On the same day, MBLAQ also began their comeback promotions for Be a Man by performing at a comeback showcase in WAPOP Hall at 8PM (KST).

On October 13, 2014, it was rumored that Lee Joon and Thunder would be leaving the group after the expiration of their contract with J. Tune Camp. However, J. Tune Camp released an official announcement stating that this was a rumor and that both Joon and Thunder are in talks with the company regarding their future activities.

On November 18, 2014, J. Tune Camp revealed a mysterious image on their official Twitter which showed the date November 25, 2014. It turned out to be the release date of their upcoming album which is made up of self-composed songs.

A few days later on November 20, 2014, J. Tune Camp revealed the track list on their official Twitter and the album which appears to be titled "Winter".

On December 16, 2014, it was announced Joon and Thunder had departed from the group and they will focus on individual activities for the time being; Joon focusing on filming his current drama, MBC's Mr. Back and Thunder studying music for a while.

=== 2015: Mirror ===
The group released their eighth mini album Mirror on June 9, 2015, as a trio.

== Discography ==
- BLAQ Style (2011)

== Music, dance, and influence ==
Initially debuting as a group more focused on dance and pop, MBLAQ have since experimented with different genres. "Oh Yeah" and "Y" were dance/pop tracks, "My Dream", "Last Luv" and "Rust" are ballad tracks, "Bang Bang Bang" is rock ballad, "Cry" is an R&B track, and "Stay" is a track infused with hip-hop, electronic and rock.

With Rain being their mentor and major influence, he has either written, composed, produced and/or choreographed a few tracks for MBLAQ, including "Oh Yeah", "G.O.O.D Luv", and "Y". For the release of Just BLAQ and Y, MBLAQ focused heavily on their performance with strong choreography. With BLAQ Style, MBLAQ decided to focus more on the music and melody rather than the choreography.

== Concerts/Tours ==
- MBLAQ Concert "Blaq Style" (2011)
- MBLAQ Concert "Your Luv" (2011)
- MBLAQ Concert "Men in MBLAQ" (2011)
- MBLAQ Concert "Hello My A+" (2012)
- MBLAQ The 1st Asia Tour "The BLAQ% Tour" (2012)
- MBLAQ Concert In Mexico (2013)
- MBLAQ Sensation Zepp Tour (2013)
- MBLAQ Global Tour Concert "Sensation" (2013)
- MBLAQ Concert "MPARTY" (2014)
- MBLAQ Concert Summer Vacation In Tokyo (2014)
- MBLAQ Concert "Thank You" (2014)
- MBLAQ Curtain Call (2014)

== Filmography ==
=== Reality Show ===
Year	Channel	Title	Member(s)	Remarks
2009	Mnet Japan	Yo! Tokyo	MBLAQ	
2009	MBC Every 1	Idol Show	MBLAQ	Fifth Season and known as idol army, Co-hosts by Shin Bong-sun and Jung Joori.
2010	Mnet	Celebrity Goes To School	MBLAQ	Final season of the documentary reality show.
2010	GOMTV	MBLAQ's Making The Artist	MBLAQ	MBLAQ's mentor for the documentary is Kim Soo-ro.
2011	Mnet	Sesame Player	MBLAQ	Mir did not appear much as due to some injury.
2012	KBS	MBLAQ's Hello Baby	MBLAQ	Fifth season raising three multi-cultural children : Dayoung (Vietnamese-Korean), Lauren (Korean-Canadian) and Leo (French-Korean)
2012	MBC	Idol Manager	MBLAQ	

== Awards and nominations ==
Award ceremony	Year	Category	Nominee	Result	Ref.
Asia Jewelry Awards	2011	Diamond Award	MBLAQ	Won	
Asia Model Awards	2012	Popular Singer Award	MBLAQ	Won	
Golden Disc Awards	2011	Album Bonsang	BLAQ Style	Won	
Golden Disc Awards	2011	Album of the Year (Album Daesang)	BLAQ Style	Nominated	
Golden Disc Awards	2011	Digital Bonsang	"Mona Lisa"	Nominated	
Golden Disc Awards	2012	Album Bonsang	100% Ver.	Nominated	
Golden Disc Awards	2013	Album Bonsang	Love Beat	Nominated	
Korea Culture Entertainment Awards	2010	New Generation Top Ten Singers Award	MBLAQ	Won	
Korea Culture Entertainment Awards	2011	Idol Music Grand Prize	MBLAQ	Won	
Mnet 20's Choice Awards	2012	20's Performance	MBLAQ	Nominated	
Mnet Asian Music Awards	2009	Best New Male Artist	MBLAQ	Nominated	
Mnet Asian Music Awards	2010	Best Male Group	MBLAQ	Nominated	
Mnet Asian Music Awards	2010	Best Dance Performance (Male Group)	"Y"	Nominated	
Mnet Asian Music Awards	2011	Best Dance Performance (Male Group)	"Mona Lisa"	Nominated	
Mnet Asian Music Awards	2012	Best Dance Performance (Male Group)	"This Is War"	Nominated	
Republic of Korea Entertainment Arts Awards	2010	Group Singer Award	MBLAQ	Won	
