= Your Luv =

Single by MBLAQ
- Released: May 4, 2011 (Japan)
- Recorded: 2011
- Genre: J-pop, pop, Dance
- Length: 3:45
- Label: Rise Communications, Sony Music Records

MBLAQ Japanese singles chronology
"Your Luv" (2011)	"Baby U!" (2011)

Your Luv is a song released by the South Korean boy band MBLAQ. It is the group's Japanese debut single and was released on May 4, 2011 via Sony Music Records Japan.

== Promotions ==
On May 3, MBLAQ kicked off their Japanese promotions with their debut event held at Kanagawa Plaza, gathering a reported 10,000 fans. They performed the songs "Oh Yeah", "Your Luv" and "Daijoubu" and more than 4,000 CDs were sold during the event. It was announced in June that MBLAQ's "Your Luv" would be used in the Japanese anime adaption of Marvel Comics' "Blade".

== Music video ==
On the 11th of April, the music video for "Your Luv" was released on MTV Japan, and "Your Luv" ringtones were released on the ringtone downloading site, Recochoku. After the release of "Your Luv" on April 19, it was ranked first for 4 consecutive days on Recochoku. MBLAQ were also placed first on the 'Cellphone Message Music Video' chart. Furthermore, pre-orders of MBLAQ's single for the regular and limited A and B editions have ranked first, second and third.

== Track listing ==
No.	Title	Lyrics	Music	Length
1.	"Your Luv"	Nept	Miki Watanabe	3:45
2.	"Into the Light"	Ema Sato	Naoki Sekiya	4:14
3.	"Daijoubu" (ダイジョウブ; It's Alright)	WHITE JAM, Naoto Okabe, GASHIMA	WHITE JAM, Naoto Okabe	3:44
4.	"Your Luv" (Less Vocal Mix)	Nept	Miki Watanabe	3:40
Total length:				15:23

DVD (Type A)
No.	Title	Length
1.	"Your Luv" (Music video)

DVD (Type B)
No.	Title	Length
1.	"MBLAQ in Japan" (Off Shot Movie)

== Charts ==
"Your Luv" reached second position on the 'Oricon Daily Charts' for May 3, which is before their official debut and release date. On May 4, their official debut date, "Your Luv" reached first position on the 'Oricon Daily Charts', selling more than 11,000 CDs. A week after debut, MBLAQ reached second position on the 'Oricon Weekly Charts', selling more than 40,000 copies of 'Your Luv'.

=== Oricon ===
Oricon Chart	Peak	Debut Sales	Sales Total	Chart Run
Daily Singles Chart	1	41,751	45,000+	13 weeks
Weekly Singles Chart	2	41,751	45,000+	13 weeks
Monthly Singles Chart	15	41,751	45,000+	13 weeks
