= J. Tune Entertainment =

South Korean record label

J. Tune Entertainment 제이튠 엔터테인먼트
- Type: Private Company
- Industry: Popular music
- Genre: K-pop, hip hop, dance, pop, teen pop, R&B
- Founded: November 2007; 18 years ago
- Founder: Rain
- Defunct: November 2013; 12 years ago
- Fate: Merged with JYP Entertainment
- Headquarters: Seoul, South Korea
- Number of locations: 1
- Key people: Rain, MBLAQ, Two X
- Production output: Music albums
- Services: Entertainment agency
- Parent: JYP Entertainment
- Subsidiaries: J. Tune Camp
- Website: Official Website

J. Tune Entertainment (formerly known as Rainy Entertainment) was a Korean music record label founded in November 2007 by Rain. It was a subsidiary of JYP Entertainment.

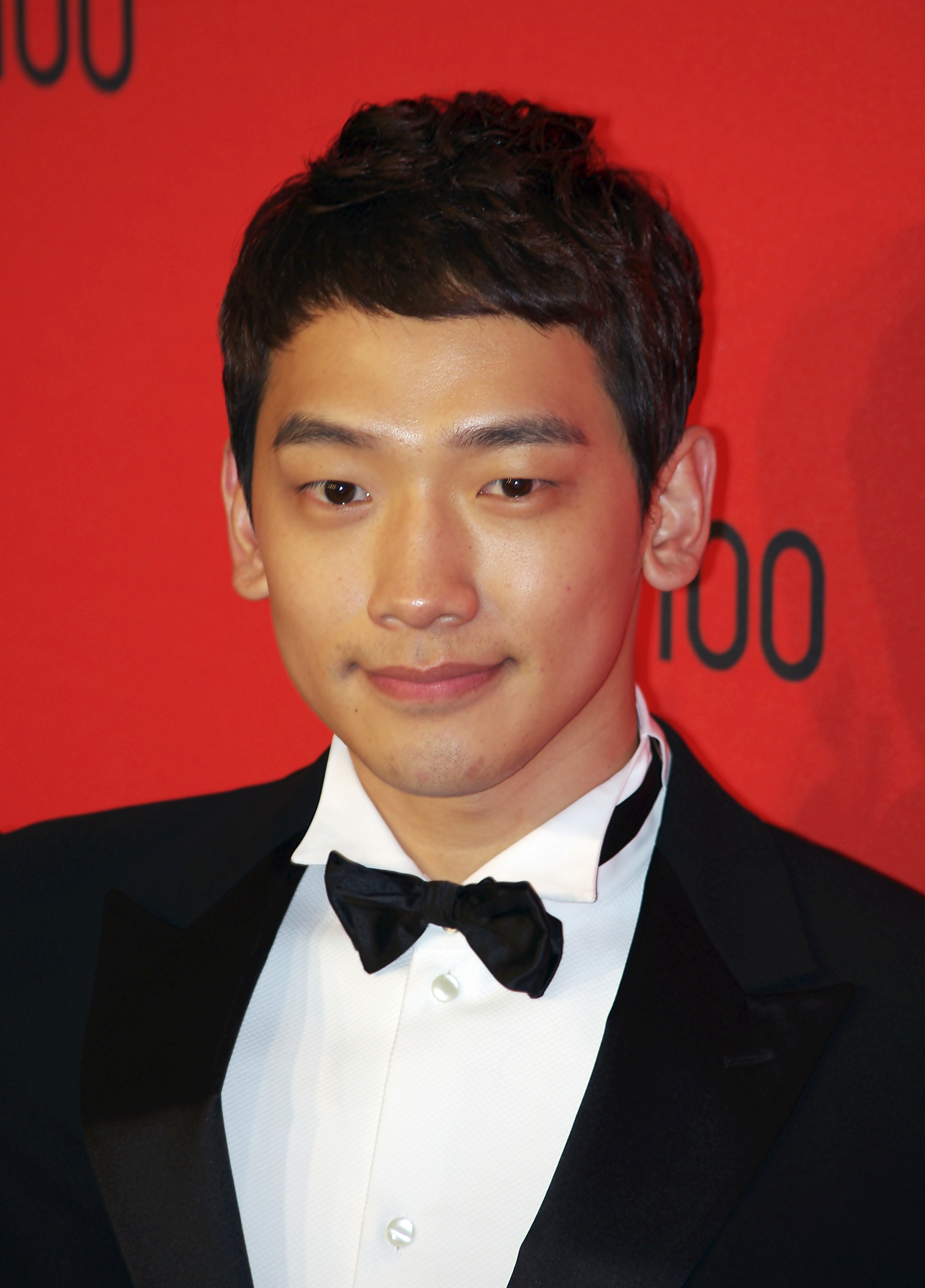
Rain, founder of J. Tune Entertainment, in 2011.

The label was fully merged into JYP Entertainment in November 2013.

== History ==
In November 2007, Rain told the Korean media that he has left JYP Entertainment and started his own entertainment company, J. Tune Entertainment (formerly known as Rainy Entertainment). He was scheduled to be CEO of the company, but told the media that he still kept in touch with his mentor and long-time trainer Park Jin-young.

In May 2008, Yeon Jung-hoon signed with J.Tune Entertainment after his military discharge.

In 2009, J. Tune Entertainment had a female trainee who was claimed by the Korean media to be the female version of Rain. The unknown female was dismissed by the company for unspecified reasons.

In July 2010, Rain reportedly sold his shares of J. Tune Entertainment to his mentor Park Jin-Young.

In December 2010, Park Jin-Young announced that J. Tune Entertainment would be merged with JYP Entertainment. JYP Entertainment become the largest shareholder in J. Tune Entertainment and it is viewed as a strategic alliance between the two companies.

In 2011, Rain announced that he will be enlisted in the army.

In June 2011, Yung Jung Hoon left J. Tune Entertainment to sign a contract with DBM Entertainment, joining the same company as long-time friend and fellow actress Lee Da-hae.

In May 2013, it was announced that Rain will be joining Cube Entertainment after he is discharged from his military service in July 2013.

=== J. Tune Entertainment and JYP Entertainment's fusion ===
On December 27, 2010, JYP Entertainment announced, 'JYP Entertainment and its employees have become the biggest shareholder of J.Tune Entertainment via third party shares allotment.'

JYPE continued, 'Some time ago, J.Tune's talent Rain approached JYPE producer Park Jin Young with a proposal. Until he joins the army next year, Rain will focus solely on his singing and acting activities. Also, he proposed that JYPE be in charge of his company's management.'

Both sides revealed, 'JYPE's shareholders had the same suggestion as Rain's, and the proposal accepted after a review.'

JYPE expressed, 'In the future, Rain will be able to freely and actively promote himself with the best support behind him. In the last three years, Rain has gained a lot of experience, which would create a strong and positive synergy between both.'

== Subsidiaries ==
=== J. Tune Camp ===
J. Tune Camp 제이튠캠프
- Type: Private
- Industry: Popular music
- Genre: K-pop; Dance-pop; R&B; Hip hop
- Predecessor: J. Tune Entertainment
- Founded: 2009; 17 years ago
- Founder: Jung Ji-hoon
- Defunct: 2017; 9 years ago
- Fate: Bankruptcy
- Headquarters: Samseong-dong, Gangnam District, Seoul, South Korea
- Number of locations: 1
- Key people: Gu Tae-won (CEO); artists: MBLAQ, Two X
- Services: Entertainment agency
- Parent: JYP Entertainment

J. Tune Camp, a former J. Tune Entertainment subsidiary, was an independent music record label based in South Korea. Founded in 2009 by J. Tune Entertainment, the record label roster of artists included MBLAQ. Founded in 2009 by J. Tune Entertainment, J. Tune Camp debuted their first artists, MBLAQ, in October 2009. Following the merger of J. Tune Entertainment with JYP Entertainment on December 27, 2010, J. Tune Camp stated in an interview with Newsen on January 3, 2011, that "J. Tune Camp and J. Tune Entertainment are separate corporate bodies" and that the merger of J. Tune Entertainment and JYP Entertainment will not affect the label. It also stated that MBLAQ will not be seen as part of JYP Entertainment. In February 2017, G.O wrote a letter to fans, hinting the closing of J.Tune Camp. Allkpop has confirmed the dissipation of the label, said "J.Tune Camp has basically dissipated. All the managers left, and Mad Town has signed with another label. They don't even have a celebrity that can promote, so it won't be able to be a company."

Former artists

- MBLAQ (2009–2016) (Hiatus)
  - Lee Joon (2009–2014)
  - Thunder (2009–2014)
- Two X (2012–2014)
- Madtown (2014–2016)
- Pro C (Inactive)

== Former Artists ==
- Yeon Jung-hoon
- Rain
- Two X
- Madtown

== Embezzlement Lawsuit ==
In April 2010, a fabric manufacturing company filed a lawsuit against Rain and his agency J.Tune Entertainment, saying that they had suffered financial losses due to J.Tune's fashion affiliate J.Tune Creative. The plaintiff claimed that the company had an investment of two billion won, but Rain and other shareholders of J.Tune Creative embezzled their money by falsely registering the company's stock assets worth 2.5 billion won and claiming the 2.2 billion won total fee for Rain's modeling work were unreasonable.

In December 2010, prosecutors ruled that they found the fabric company's accusation on J.Tune Creative falsely registering the company's stock assets as fake, and that Rain's modeling fees of 2.2 billion during three years was not excessive. However, prosecutors indicted two officials at J.Tune for embezzling 900 million won of the firm's money used to acquire a larger stake in the agency.
