= List of Running Man episodes (2012) =

- No. of episodes: 52

Release
- Original network: SBS
- Original release: January 1 – December 30, 2012

Season chronology
- ← Previous; 2011 Next → 2013

This is a list of episodes of the South Korean variety show Running Man in 2012. The show airs on SBS as part of their Good Sunday lineup.

== Episodes ==
List of episodes (episode 75–126)
Ep.	Airdate (Filming date)	Guest(s)	Landmark	Teams		Mission	Results
75 (Note: New Year's Special.) (Note: Special appearances by Lee Hwi-jae, Jang Yun-jeong, Tae Jin-ah, Son Ho-young, Lee Hyun and Dong-jun (ZE:A) from Challenge! 1000 Songs.)	January 1, 2012 (December 13, 2011)	Choi Min-ho (Shinee) Hyo-rin (Sistar) Siwon (Super Junior) Sohee (Wonder Girls) Sulli (f(x))	Paris Park (Mok-dong, Yangcheon District, Seoul)	Sohee Team (Sohee, Yoo Jae-suk, Kim Jong-kook); Sulli Team (Sulli, Gary, Haha); Hyo-rin Team (Hyo-rin, Jee Seok-jin, Lee Kwang-soo); Ji-hyo Team (Song Ji-hyo, Choi Min-ho, Siwon)		Solve for the number 1	Sulli Team Wins
76 (Note: IU only appeared on the 2nd day (ep 77).)	January 8, 2012 (December 26, 2011)	Ji Jin-hee Joo Sang-wook Kim Sung-soo Lee Chun-hee IU	Yeosu City Hall (Yeosu, South Jeolla Province)	Killers (Ji Jin-hee, Joo Sang-wook, Kim Sung-soo, Lee Chun-hee)	Running Man Team (Yoo Jae-suk, Haha, Jee Seok-jin, Kim Jong-kook, Gary); Spies (Lee Kwang-soo, Song Ji-hyo)	Find the four correct computers	Killers Win; Killers received speciality products of Yeosu (Han-u, jeotgal and kimchi).
77	January 15, 2012 (December 27, 2011)	Ji Jin-hee Joo Sang-wook Kim Sung-soo Lee Chun-hee IU	Hahwa Island (Yeosu, South Jeolla Province)	Red Team (Yoo Jae-suk, Haha, Song Ji-hyo, Joo Sang-wook); Blue Team (Gary, Jee Seok-jin, Kim Jong-kook, Ji Jin-hee); Yellow Team (Lee Kwang-soo, Kim Sung-soo, Lee Chun-hee, IU)		Find and take numbers for a bingo	Red Team Wins; Red Team left the island on a helicopter.
78 (Note: Seollal Special.)	January 22, 2012 (January 9, 2012)	Hong Soo-hyun Lee Beom-soo	Lotte Mall (Gangseo District, Seoul)	Skirmish/Reconnaissance: Cho (楚) (Gary, Haha, Kim Jong-kook, Hong Soo-hyun); Han (漢) (Yoo Jae-suk, Jee Seok-jin, Lee Kwang-soo, Song Ji-hyo, Lee Beom-soo)	World War: Cho (楚) (Haha, Kim Jong-kook, Hong Soo-hyun); Han (漢) (Yoo Jae-suk, Jee Seok-jin, Song Ji-hyo, Lee Beom-soo); Ji (志) (Gary, Lee Kwang-soo)	Find the pieces of the Royal Seal	Han Wins; Han received a Han-u set.
79 (Note: Special appearances by Kim Sung-ki, Seo Ki-won, Son Min-hyuk, and Jung Se-yeop from Gag Tonight.)	January 29, 2012 (January 10, 2012)	Kim Je-dong Yoon Do-hyun	Club Harmony Cruise Ship (Saha District, Busan)	Lupin (Jee Seok-jin)	Sherlock Holmes Team (Yoo Jae-suk, Gary, Haha, Kim Jong-kook, Lee Kwang-soo, Song Ji-hyo, Kim Je-dong, Yoon Do-hyun)	Eliminate Lupin	Kim Jong-kook and Song Ji-hyo Wins; Kim Jong-kook and Song Ji-hyo received special "Great Detective" name tags and the Blue Sapphire.
80	February 5, 2012 (January 16, 2012)	Go Ara Hyo-min (T-ara) Im Soo-hyang	Paradise Spa Dogo (Asan, South Chungcheong Province)	Retro Meeting Race: Yoo Jae-suk & Im Soo-hyang; Gary & Hyo-min; Haha & Song Ji-hyo; Jee Seok-jin & Lee Kwang-soo; Kim Jong-kook & Go Ara	Find Charlie: Charlie & Charlie's Angels (Song Ji-hyo, Go Ah-ra, Hyo-min, Im Soo-hyang) (Note: The three guests who were "Charlie's Angels", did not know that Song Ji-hyo was the "Charlie".); Running Man Team (Yoo Jae-suk, Gary, Haha, Jee Seok-jin, Kim Jong-kook, Lee Kwang-soo)	Defeat the other team	Charlie & Charlie's Angels Win; Charlie & Charlie's Angels received Asan speciality products and golden rings.
81	February 12, 2012 (January 30, 2012)	No guests	Songdo Convensia (Songdo-dong, Yeonsu District, Incheon)	No teams		Find and acclaim Gary's backpack	Lee Kwang-soo Wins; Lee Kwang-soo received an antique 19th century inkwell that Gary received in Europe.
82 (Note: Oh Ji-ho only appeared on the 2nd day (ep 83).)	February 19, 2012 (February 6, 2012)	Lee Da-hae Oh Ji-ho	Shinsegae Department Store, Centum City (Haeundae District, Busan)	Dry Sauna Room 3 Set Race: Hyukie Ji-hyo Seok-jin Team (Yoo Jae-suk, Jee Seok-jin, Song Ji-hyo); Da-hae and lol lol Team (Gary, Haha, Lee Da-hae); Tiger and Giraffe Team (Kim Jong-kook, Lee Kwang-soo)	Eliminate All Spies: Chasing Team (Lee Da-hae); Spies (Yoo Jae-suk, Gary, Haha, Jee Seok-jin, Kim Jong-kook, Lee Kwang-soo, Song Ji-hyo) (Note: Running Men did not know that they were all spies. They were given missions individually and secretly .)	Spies must do their mission. Lee Da Hae is not a spy and she must eliminate all spies to win.	Lee Da-hae Wins; Lee Da-hae received a digital television.
83	February 26, 2012 (February 7, 2012)	Lee Da-hae Oh Ji-ho	Nurimaru APEC House (Haeundae District, Busan)	Purple Team (Yoo Jae-suk, Gary, Song Ji-hyo); Red Team (Haha, Lee Da-hae, Oh Ji-ho); Blue Team (Jee Seok-jin, Kim Jong-kook, Lee Kwang-soo)		Get the real package	Purple Team Wins; Yoo Jae-suk, Gary and Song Ji-hyo received gifts wanted by the other members.
84	March 4, 2012 (February 20, 2012)	Dae-sung G-Dragon Seung-ri Tae-yang T.O.P (Big Bang)	Seodaemun Museum of Natural History (Seodaemun District, Seoul)	Running Man Team (Yoo Jae-suk, Gary, Haha, Jee Seok-jin, Kim Jong-kook, Lee Kwang-soo, Song Ji-hyo)	BigBang Team (Dae-sung, G-Dragon, Seung-ri, Tae-yang, T.O.P)	Defeat the other team	BigBang Team Wins; Big Bang members received specially made blue-white name tags and designer clothing from Cheil Industries.
85	March 11, 2012 (February 20, 2012)	Dae-sung G-Dragon Seung-ri Tae-yang T.O.P (Big Bang)	Cheil Industries Fashion Division Head Office (Jongno District, Seoul)	Running Man Team (Yoo Jae-suk, Gary, Haha, Jee Seok-jin, Kim Jong-kook, Lee Kwang-soo, Song Ji-hyo)	BigBang Team (Dae-sung, G-Dragon, Seung-ri, Tae-yang, T.O.P)	Defeat the other team	BigBang Team Wins; Big Bang members received specially made blue-white name tags and designer clothing from Cheil Industries.
86 (Note: Special appearances and commentaries by announcers Choi Ki-hwan and Kim Min-ji.)	March 18, 2012 (February 21, 2012)	Gaeko (Dynamic Duo) Ha Ji-won	SBS Broadcasting Center (Mok-dong, Yangcheon District, Seoul)	Red Team (Yoo Jae-suk, Gary, Ha Ji-won); Blue Team (Haha, Song Ji-hyo, Gaeko); Yellow Team (Jee Seok-jin, Kim Jong-kook, Lee Kwang-soo)		Defeat the other teams	Red Team Wins; Red Team received gold medals, Blue Team received silver medals, Yellow Team received bronze medals.
87 (Note: Special appearances by Jung Eun-pyo, Kim Ok-jung, and the children from Star Junior Show.)	March 25, 2012 (March 12, 2012)	Han Ga-in	Korea Job World (Bundang District, Seongnam, Gyeonggi Province)	The Moon That Pierces The Sun: Blue Team (Yoo Jae-suk, Gary, Lee Kwang-soo, Han Ga-in); Red Team (Haha, Jee Seok-jin, Kim Jong-kook, Song Ji-hyo)	Find Han Ga-in's First Love: Mission Team (Haha, Han Ga-in); Chasing Team (Yoo Jae-suk, Gary, Jee Seok-jin, Kim Jong-kook, Lee Kwang-soo, Song Ji-hyo)	Defeat the other members	Mission Team Wins; Haha and Han Ga-in received gold marbles.
88	April 1, 2012 (March 5, 2012)	BoA Jung Jae-hyung	The Shilla Jeju (Seogwipo, Jeju Province)	Red Team (Yoo Jae-suk, Gary, BoA); Yellow Team (Haha, Kim Jong-kook, Jung Jae-hyung); Blue Team (Jee Seok-jin, Lee Kwang-soo, Song Ji-hyo)		Solve the Running Man Code	Red Team Wins; Yoo Jae-suk, Gary and BoA were served Jeju seafood for dinner. Haha, Kim Jong-kook and Jung Jae-hyung were given curry to cook for dinner.
89 (Note: Special appearance by Julien Kang and the comedians from Gag Tonight.)	April 8, 2012 (March 6, 2012)	BoA Jung Jae-hyung	Ilchul Land (Seogwipo, Jeju Province)	No teams		Find the key to leave Wonderland	Song Ji-hyo Wins; Song Ji-hyo received a gold key.
90	April 15, 2012 (April 2, 2012)	Lee Deok-hwa Park Jun-gyu Park Sang-myun	Cheorwon County (Gangwon Province)	Yoo Jae-suk & Lee Kwang-soo; Gary & Song Ji-hyo; Haha & Lee Deok-hwa; Jee Seok-jin & Park Sang-myun; Kim Jong-kook & Park Jun-gyu		Earn fishing equipment and catch the biggest fish	No winners (Note: The final mission was not complete as no fish was caught after three hours due to heavy rain.)
91	April 22, 2012 (April 9, 2012)	No guests	SUNY Korea (Songdo International Business District, Incheon)	Yoo-mes Bond (Yoo Jae-suk)	Mission Team (Gary, Haha, Jee Seok-jin, Kim Jong-kook, Lee Kwang-soo, Song Ji-hyo)	Yoo-mes Bond; Recapture the others before they escape. Mission Team; Find the right key and escape.	Yoo-mes Bond Wins; Yoo Jae-suk received gold bars.
92	April 29, 2012 (April 16, 2012)	Chun Jung-myung Park Jin-young	Muuido (Jung District, Incheon)	Red Team (Yoo Jae-suk, Gary, Chun Jung-myung); Blue Team (Haha, Kim Jong-kook, Song Ji-hyo); Yellow Team (Jee Seok-jin, Lee Kwang-soo, Park Jin-young)		Defeat the other teams	Yellow Team Wins; Jee Seok-jin, Lee Kwang-soo and Park Jin-young each received golden chopsticks.
93 (Note: The guests only briefly appeared in ep 93 as "Angels" to help in a mission (Round 4).)	May 6, 2012 (April 23, 2012)	Han Seung-yeon Park Gyu-ri (Kara) Hyuna (4Minute) Krystal (f(x)) Suzy (Miss A)	Seoul Land (Moonwon-dong, Gwacheon, Gyeonggi Province)	No teams		Defeat the other members	Kim Jong-kook Wins; Kim Jong-kook received the power to select all the partners for the subsequent race.
94	May 13, 2012 (April 24, 2012)	Han Seung-yeon Park Gyu-ri (Kara) Hyuna (4Minute) Krystal (f(x)) Suzy (Miss A)	Mokdong Wedding Palace (Mok-dong, Yangcheon District, Seoul)	Yoo Jae-suk & Han Seung-yeon; Gary & Krystal; Haha & Suzy; Jee Seok-jin & Song Ji-hyo; Kim Jong-kook & Hyuna; Lee Kwang-soo & Park Gyu-ri		Defeat the other teams	Gary & Krystal Wins; Krystal received a gold tiara.
95 (Note: G.O, Lee Joon, Seung-ho, Thunder (MBLAQ), Bo-ra, Da-som, Hyo-rin, So-you (Sistar) only appeared on the 1st day (ep 95) to compete in a mission. Park Ji-sung made a special appearance on the 1st day (ep 95) delivering missions and acted as the guest on ep 96 and 97. IU only appeared on the 2nd day (ep 96) and briefly on the 3rd day (first half of ep 97). Jong Tae-se only appeared on the 3rd day (second half of ep 97) to compete in a mission. Yoo Jae-suk did not appear on the 3rd day (second half of ep 97), with Park Ji-sung acting as special host. Special appearances by Rio Ferdinand, Lee Chung-yong, Ahn Jung-hwan and Song Joong-ki during the Asian Dream Cup match.)	May 20, 2012 (May 7, 2012)	Park Ji-sung IU	Pantech Building (Sangam-dong, Mapo District, Seoul)	Find the 8th Running Man: No teams Find the 9th Running Man: Mission Team (Bo-ra, Da-som, Hyo-rin, So-you); Chasing Team (Yoo Jae-suk, Gary, Haha, Jee Seok-jin, Kim Jong-kook, Lee Kwang-soo, Song Ji-hyo)	Find the 10th Running Man: Mission Team (G.O, Lee Joon, Seung-ho, Thunder); Chasing Team (Yoo Jae-suk, Gary, Haha, Jee Seok-jin, Kim Jong-kook, Lee Kwang-soo, Song Ji-hyo); Find the 11th Running Man: No teams	Defeat the other members	Song Ji-hyo Wins; Song Ji-hyo received a signed soccer ball by Park Ji-sung and a golden star pin.
96	May 27, 2012 (May 20 & 21, 2012)	Park Ji-sung IU	University of Incheon Songdo Campus (Yeonsu District, Incheon)	Ji-sung Team (Park Ji-sung, Lee Kwang-soo)	Running Man Team (Yoo Jae-suk, Gary, Haha, Jee Seok-jin, Kim Jong-kook, Song Ji-hyo, IU)	Defeat the other team	Spy Team Wins; Park Ji-sung could invite the members to Thailand for the 2012 Asian Dream Cup.
96	May 27, 2012 (May 20 & 21, 2012)	Park Ji-sung IU	POSCO Global R&D Centre (Songdo-dong, Yeonsu District, Incheon)	Park Ji-sung Team (Park Ji-sung, Yoo Jae-suk, Kim Jong-kook); Mong-Easy Team (Song Ji-hyo, Jee Seok-jin, Lee Kwang-soo); IU Team (IU, Gary, Haha)		Defeat the other team	Spy Team Wins; Park Ji-sung could invite the members to Thailand for the 2012 Asian Dream Cup.
97	June 3, 2012 (May 21, 22 & 23, 2012)	Park Ji-sung IU	POSCO Global R&D Centre (Songdo-dong, Yeonsu District, Incheon)	Spy Team (Yoo Jae-suk, Park Ji-sung)	Mission Team (Gary, Haha, Jee Seok-jin, Kim Jong-kook, Lee Kwang-soo, Song Ji-hyo, IU)	Defeat the other team	Spy Team Wins; Park Ji-sung could invite the members to Thailand for the 2012 Asian Dream Cup.
97	June 3, 2012 (May 21, 22 & 23, 2012)	Park Ji-sung IU	SCG Stadium (Nonthaburi, Thailand)	No teams		Defeat the other members	Gary and Kim Jong-kook Wins; Gary and Kim Jong-kook got to participate in the 2012 Asian Dream Cup.
98 (Note: Special appearance by Yoo Ji-ae, Cho Seung-hee and Yeon-kyung.)	June 10, 2012 (June 4, 2012)	No guests	Tesco Home plus Academy (Muuido, Jung District, Incheon)	Humans (Yoo Jae-suk, Haha, Jee Seok-jin, Kim Jong-kook, Lee Kwang-soo, Song Ji-hyo)	Parent Zombie (Gary)	Humans' Mission: Eliminate the infected humans by using water gun with the special solution. Eliminate the Parent Zombie by tearing his nametag. Parent Zombie's Mission: Turn Humans to Zombies by tearing their nametags.	Gary Wins
99	June 17, 2012 (May 8, 2012)	Im Ho Lee Tae-gon	Xi Gallery (Mapo District, Seoul)	Gon Kingdom (Lee Tae-gon, Yoo Jae-suk, Haha); Song Kingdom (Song Ji-hyo, Gary, Jee Seok-jin); Ho Kingdom (Im Ho, Kim Jong-kook, Lee Kwang-soo)	Spy Team (Haha, Lee Kwang-soo)	Defeat the other teams	Im Ho, Kim Jong-kook & Lee Kwang-soo Wins; Ho Kingdom claimed their territory.
100 (Note: 100th Episode Special.)	June 24, 2012 (June 18, 2012)	Kim Hee-sun	Mecenatpolis (Hapjeong-dong, Mapo District, Seoul)	No teams		Defeat the other members	Yoo Jae-suk Wins; Yoo Jae-suk received a Running Man Gold Trophy, which he gave to Kim Hee-sun as a gift.
101	July 1, 2012 (June 19, 2012)	Kim Bum-soo Yoon Do-hyun Yoon Jong-shin	Korea Institute of Science and Technology (Seongbuk District, Seoul)	Green Team (Yoo Jae-suk, Lee Kwang-soo, Yoon Do-hyun); Blue Team (Gary, Haha, Kim Bum-soo); Red Team (Jee Seok-jin, Kim Jong-kook, Yoon Jong-shin)	C.S.I. Team (Song Ji-hyo, Yoo Jae-suk, Lee Kwang-soo, Gary, Haha, Jee Seok-jin, Kim Jong-kook); Criminal Team (Kim Bum-soo, Yoon Do-hyun, Yoon Jong-shin)	Find the real gold	Gary & Haha Wins; Gary and Haha received gold ornaments.
102 (Note: Special appearance by Lee Deok-hwa through a video and Son Hyun-joo.)	July 8, 2012 (June 25, 2012)	Kim Soo-hyun	SBS Tanhyeon-dong Production Center (Ilsanseo District, Goyang, Gyeonggi Province)	Running Man Team (Yoo Jae-suk, Gary, Haha, Jee Seok-jin, Kim Jong-kook, Lee Kwang-soo, Song Ji-hyo)	Criminal Team Boss (Kim Soo-hyun)	Find the real gold	Kim Soo-hyun Wins; Kim Soo-hyun received the Golden Turtle.
103	July 15, 2012 (July 2, 2012)	Noh Sa-yeon Shin Se-kyung Yoo Jun-sang	S-Oil Building (Gongdeok-dong, Mapo District, Seoul)	Princess Sa-yeon Team (Noh Sa-yeon, Yoo Jae-suk, Lee Kwang-soo); Princess Se-kyung Team (Shin Se-kyung, Gary, Haha); Princess Ji-hyo Team (Song Ji-hyo, Jee Seok-jin, Kim Jong-kook)	Beast (Yoo Jun-sang)	Eliminate the beast	Princess Ji-hyo Team Wins; Princess Ji-hyo Team received a gold ring.
104 (Note: London Olympics Special.) (Note: Special appearance by Jung Jae-hyung as opening ceremony host.)	July 22, 2012 (July 9, 2012)	Eunhyuk (Super Junior) Ham Eun-jung (T-ara) Jung Yong-hwa (CNBLUE) Lee Joon (MBLAQ) Nichkhun (2PM) Si-wan (ZE:A) Yoon Doo-joon (Beast)	Hanseong Baekje Museum (Bangi-dong, Songpa District, Seoul)	Running Man Team (Yoo Jae-suk, Gary, Haha, Jee Seok-jin, Kim Jong-kook, Lee Kwang-soo, Song Ji-hyo)	Idol Team (Eunhyuk, Ham Eun-jung, Jung Yong-hwa, Lee Joon, Nichkhun, Si-wan, Yoon Doo-joon)	Defeat the other team	Idol Team Wins; Idol Team members each received a gold medal.
105 (Note: Kim Je-dong only appeared on the 2nd day (ep 106).)	August 5, 2012 (July 22, 2012)	Han Ji-min Kim Je-dong	Aqua Planet Jeju (Seogwipo, Jeju Province)	Ji-min Team (Yoo Jae-suk, Gary, Haha, Han Ji-min)	Ji-hyo Team (Jee Seok-jin, Kim Jong-kook, Lee Kwang-soo, Song Ji-hyo)	Defeat the other team	Ji-min Team Wins; Han Ji-min received all vacation allowance.
106	August 12, 2012 (July 23, 2012)	Han Ji-min Kim Je-dong	Daum Communications Office (Jeju City, Jeju Province)	No teams		Find Han Ji-min's true love	Kim Jong-kook and Han Ji-min Wins; Han Ji-min received a gold ring.
107 (Note: Gaeko (Dynamic Duo) replaced Gary who was unable to attend due to an injury.) (Note: Special appearances by actor Jo Jae-yoon and singer Skull.)	August 19, 2012 (August 13, 2012)	Gaeko (Dynamic Duo) Jang Shin-young Kim Sang-joong	Yonsei University International Campus (Songdo-dong, Yeonsu District, Incheon)	Running Man Team (Yoo Jae-suk, Jee Seok-jin, Kim Jong-kook, Lee Kwang-soo, Song Ji-hyo, Gaeko)	The Chaser Team (Haha, Kim Sang-joong, Jang Shin-young)	Obtain the gold badge	Jang Shin-young Wins; Jang Shin-young received a golden badge.
108 (Note: Lee Joon (MBLAQ) replaced Gary who was unable to attend due to an injury.)	August 26, 2012 (August 14, 2012)	Gong Hyo-jin Lee Joon (MBLAQ)	NS Home Shopping Building (Sampyeong-dong, Bundang District, Seongnam, Gyeonggi Province)	Yellow Supporting Character Team (Yoo Jae-suk, Song Ji-hyo, Lee Joon); Blue Supporting Character Team (Haha, Jee Seok-jin, Kim Jong-kook); Main Character Team (Lee Kwang-soo, Gong Hyo-jin)		Defeat the other team	Main Character Team Wins; Lee Kwang-soo and Gong Hyo-jin received a gold trophy and necklace.
109	September 2, 2012 (August 27 and 28, 2012)	Park Tae-hwan Son Yeon-jae	Herb Island (Sinbuk-myeon, Pocheon, Gyeonggi Province)	Red Team (Yoo Jae-suk, Lee Kwang-soo, Son Yeon-jae); Green Team (Gary, Kim Jong-kook, Park Tae-hwan); Blue Team (Haha, Jee Seok-jin, Song Ji-hyo)		Defeat the other teams	Red Team Wins
110	September 9, 2012 (August 28, 2012)	Park Tae-hwan Son Yeon-jae	Herb Island (Sinbuk-myeon, Pocheon, Gyeonggi Province)	Red Team (Yoo Jae-suk, Lee Kwang-soo, Son Yeon-jae); Green Team (Gary, Kim Jong-kook, Park Tae-hwan); Blue Team (Haha, Jee Seok-jin, Song Ji-hyo)		Defeat the other teams	Red Team Wins
110	September 9, 2012 (August 28, 2012)	Park Tae-hwan Son Yeon-jae	Daejin University (Seondan-dong, Pocheon, Gyeonggi Province)	No teams		Defeat the other members	Park Tae-hwan Wins; Park Tae-hwan received an idonggalbi set.
111 (Note: Im Ha-ryong only appeared on ep 111 and was unable to appear on ep 112 due to scheduling conflicts, Tae-yeon (Girls' Generation) replaced him on ep 112.)	September 16, 2012 (September 3, 2012)	Go Chang-suk Im Ha-ryong Lee Jong-won Shin Jung-geun Son Byong-ho Tae-yeon (Girls' Generation)	National Maritime Museum (Dongsam-dong, Yeongdo District, Busan)	Purple (Big Hyungnim) Team (Yoo Jae-suk, Jee Seok-jin, Im Ha-ryong, Son Byong-ho); Green (The Last Match) Team (Gary, Haha, Song Ji-hyo, Lee Jong-won); Red Team (Kim Jong-kook, Lee Kwang-soo, Go Chang-suk, Shin Jung-geun)		Find the treasure chest	Red Team Wins; Kim Jong-kook received a four-day, three night vacation for four in Busan, which he gave to Im Ha-ryong. Im Ha-ryong shared those tickets with his team.
112	September 23, 2012 (September 4, 2012)	Go Chang-suk Im Ha-ryong Lee Jong-won Shin Jung-geun Son Byong-ho Tae-yeon (Girls' Generation)	Moorim P&P Paper Mill (Onsan-eup, Ulju County, Ulsan)	Blue Team (Yoo Jae-suk & Go Chang-suk); White Team (Gary & Lee Jong-won); Red Team (Haha & Shin Jung-geun); Green Team (Jee Seok-jin & Kim Jong-kook); Orange Team (Lee Kwang-soo & Tae-yeon); Purple Team (Song Ji-hyo & Son Byong-ho)		Defeat the other teams	Blue Team Wins; Yoo Jae-suk and Go Chang-suk received twelve golden eggs.
113 (Note: Chuseok Special.)	September 30, 2012 (September 17, 2012)	Jeon Mi-seon Yoo Hae-jin Yum Jung-ah	Samcheonggak (Seongbuk-dong, Seongbuk District, Seoul)	Gary's Family (Gary, Song Ji-hyo, Yoo Jae-suk, Yoo Hae-jin); Jong-kook's Family (Kim Jong-kook, Haha, Yum Jung-ah); Kwang-soo's Family (Lee Kwang-soo, Jee Seok-jin, Jeon Mi-seon)		Defeat the absolute ddakji	Jong-kook's Family Wins; Haha, Kim Jong-kook and Yum Jung-ah received a gold "Don't walk but run!" plate.
114 (Note: Max Changmin and U-Know Yunho (TVXQ) only appeared on the 2nd day (ep 115).)	October 7, 2012 (October 1, 2012)	Moon Geun-young Max Changmin U-Know Yunho (TVXQ)	Culture Park (Yeonsu District, Incheon)	Running Man Team (Gary, Haha, Jee Seok-jin, Kim Jong-kook, Lee Kwang-soo, Song Ji-hyo, Moon Geun-young) (Note: Running Man Team were divided into Red and Blue Team. After each mission, the winning team could switch out who they believe is X-Man in their team.)	X-Man (Yoo Jae-suk)	Find the X-Man	Yoo Jae-suk Wins; Yoo Jae-suk received a gold "X".
115	October 14, 2012 (October 2, 2012)	Moon Geun-young Max Changmin U-Know Yunho (TVXQ)	Coast Guard Main Station (Songdo-dong, Incheon)	Bells Race: Yoo Jae-suk & U-Know Yunho; Gary & Song Ji-hyo; Haha & Max Changmin; Jee Seok-jin & Lee Kwang-soo; Kim Jong-kook & Moon Geun-young	Bells Hide and Seek: Hiding Team (Yoo Jae-suk, Gary, Jee Seok-jin, Lee Kwang-soo, Song Ji-hyo, U-Know Yunho); Chasing Team (Haha, Kim Jong-kook, Max Changmin, Moon Geun-young)	Defeat the other team	Chasing Team Wins; Haha, Kim Jong-kook, Max Chang-min and Moon Geun-young received Coast Guard Gold Badges.
116 (Note: Suzy (Miss A) and Yubin (Wonder Girls) only appeared on the 2nd day (ep 117).)	October 21, 2012 (October 8, 2012)	Ji Jin-hee Ji Sung Song Chang-eui Suzy (Miss A) Yubin (Wonder Girls)	Suncheon Open Set (Jorye-dong, Suncheon, South Jeolla Province)	No teams		Defeat the other members	Ji Jin-hee Wins; Ji Jin-hee received a gold Hourglass.
117	October 28, 2012 (October 9, 2012)	Ji Jin-hee Ji Sung Song Chang-eui Suzy (Miss A) Yubin (Wonder Girls)	Asian Culture Complex (Gwangsan-dong, Dong District, Gwangju)	Yubin Team (Yubin, Yoo Jae-suk, Gary, Ji Sung); Suzy Team (Suzy, Haha, Lee Kwang-soo, Ji Jin-hee); Ji-hyo Team (Song Ji-hyo, Jee Seok-jin, Kim Jong-kook, Song Chang-eui)		Solve the absolute riddle and win in rock-paper-scissors	Yubin Team Wins
118 (Note: Special appearance by Park Bo-young.)	November 4, 2012 (October 22, 2012)	Choi Min-soo Park Bo-young	Jungnang Camp Ground (Mangu-dong, Jungnang District, Seoul)	Running Man Team (Yoo Jae-suk, Gary, Haha, Jee Seok-jin, Kim Jong-kook, Lee Kwang-soo, Song Ji-hyo)	Running Man Hunter (Choi Min-soo)	Collect all six pieces of Choi Min-soo's name tag and put it on his back	Choi Min-soo Wins
119 (Note: Special appearance by announcer Kim Hwan as referee during Superpowers Baseball.)	November 11, 2012 (October 29, 2012)	Choo Shin-soo Jin Se-yeon Ryu Hyun-jin	Gongrung Youth Baseball Park (Nowon District, Seoul)	Take Off The Name Tags: No teams	Superpowers Baseball: Choo Team (Choo Shin-soo, Yoo Jae-suk, Haha, Jee Seok-jin, Song Ji-hyo); Ryu Team (Ryu Hyun-jin, Gary, Kim Jong-kook, Lee Kwang-soo, Jin Se-yeon)	Win Superpowers Baseball	Ryu Team Wins; Ryu Team received a gold trophy.
120	November 18, 2012 (November 12, 2012)	Lee Seung-gi Park Shin-hye	Poeun Art Hall (Suji District, Yongin, Gyeonggi Province)	Red Team (Yoo Jae-suk, Lee Kwang-soo, Lee Seung-gi); Blue Team (Gary, Jee Seok-jin, Song Ji-hyo); Yellow Team (Haha, Kim Jong-kook, Park Shin-hye)		Defeat the other teams	Red Team Wins; Red and Blue Team received tablet PCs and mobile phones, Yellow Team received mobiles phones only for the next mission.
121	November 25, 2012 (November 13, 2012)	Lee Seung-gi Park Shin-hye	SBS Prism Tower (Sangam-dong, Mapo District, Seoul)	M16 Agents (Yoo Jae-suk, Gary, Haha, Jee Seok-jin, Lee Kwang-soo, Song Ji-hyo, Lee Seung-gi)	Villains (Kim Jong-kook, Park Shin-hye)	Prevent the safe explosion and eliminate the villains	No Winners; No one was successful in preventing the safe explosion. The gold safe exploded, therefore no gold prizes will be given in the next three months.
122	December 2, 2012 (November 19, 2012)	Goo Ha-ra (Kara) Jung Won-gwan Kim Tae-hyung Lee Sang-won (Sobangcha) Kang Susie Kim Wan-sun Park Nam-jung	ROCKCAMP (Galsan-dong, Bupyeong District, Incheon)	Running Man Team (Yoo Jae-suk, Gary, Haha, Jee Seok-jin, Lee Kwang-soo, Song Ji-hyo, Goo Ha-ra)	Legend Team (Kim Jong-kook, Jung Won-gwan, Kang Susie, Kim Tae-hyung, Kim Wan-sun, Lee Sang-won, Park Nam-jung)	Have more marbles in the circle	Legend Team Wins
123	December 9, 2012 (November 26, 2012)	Go Soo Han Hyo-joo	Song Cham Bong Joseon Village (Ipyeong-myeon, Jeongeup, North Jeolla Province)	Purple Team (Yoo Jae-suk, Gary, Han Hyo-joo); Blue Team (Haha, Kim Jong-kook, Go Soo); Yellow Team (Jee Seok-jin, Lee Kwang-soo, Song Ji-hyo)		Make the best kimchi	Yellow Team Wins; Yellow Team received Han-u and bokbunja juice sets.
124	December 16, 2012 (November 27, 2012)	Go Soo Han Hyo-joo	Jeonju University (Wansan District, Jeonju, North Jeolla Province)	No teams		Defeat the other members	Song Ji-hyo Wins
125 (Note: Christmas Special.)	December 23, 2012 (December 10, 2012)	Jeong Hyeong-don Juvie Train (Buga Kingz) Park Sang-myun Ryu Dam Shindong (Super Junior)	Konjiam Resort (Docheok-myeon, Gwangju, Gyeonggi Province)	Red Team (Yoo Jae-suk, Gary, Song Ji-hyo, Jung Hyung-don); Yellow Team (Haha, Kim Jong-kook, Juvie Train, Ryu Dam); Blue Team (Jee Seok-jin, Lee Kwang-soo, Park Sang-myun, Shin-dong)		Defeat the other teams	Red Team Wins; Red Team received a large box of cookies. Yellow Team went skiing in red long underwear.
126 (Note: Year-End Special.)	December 30, 2012 (December 17, 2012)	Choi Ji-woo	Busan-Gyeongnam Horse Racing Park (Gangseo District, Busan)	Running Man Team (Yoo Jae-suk, Gary, Haha, Jee Seok-jin, Kim Jong-kook, Lee Kwang-soo, Song Ji-hyo)	Spy Team (Choi Ji-woo)	Fool Choi Ji-woo	Running Man Team Wins; Everyone each received a digital camera.

== Ratings ==
- Ratings listed below are the individual corner ratings of Running Man. (Note: Individual corner ratings do not include commercial time, which regular ratings include.)

Ep. #	Original Airdate	TNmS Ratings		Naver Ratings	
Ep. #	Original Airdate	Nationwide	Seoul Capital Area	Nationwide	Seoul Capital Area
75	January 1, 2012	18.6%	21.5%	19.2%	21.7%
76	January 8, 2012	18.5%	20.9%	18.6%	20.6%
77	January 15, 2012	18.0%	20.7%	20.1%	22.7%
78	January 22, 2012	12.4%	12.6%	15.7%	17.6%
79	January 29, 2012	14.4%	15.7%	18.0%	20.7%
80	February 5, 2012	17.0%	18.8%	17.2%	18.7%
81	February 12, 2012	16.7%	18.8%	17.4%	19.3%
82	February 19, 2012	17.9%	21.9%	16.7%	18.2%
83	February 26, 2012	17.5%	20.6%	18.1%	20.7%
84	March 4, 2012	17.6%	21.6%	17.7%	20.2%
85	March 11, 2012	17.8%	22.0%	16.9%	19.5%
86	March 18, 2012	16.0%	19.8%	16.9%	19.2%
87	March 25, 2012	16.4%	19.7%	17.4%	19.8%
88	April 1, 2012	17.5%	21.5%	16.7%	18.5%
89	April 8, 2012	15.4%	20.1%	16.1%	18.1%
90	April 15, 2012	13.1%	15.9%	14.3%	15.8%
91	April 22, 2012	17.5%	21.9%	17.6%	20.0%
92	April 29, 2012	13.1%	15.8%	14.3%	15.7%
93	May 6, 2012	18.3%	21.2%	17.7%	19.6%
94	May 13, 2012	17.2%	20.5%	17.0%	18.9%
95	May 20, 2012	18.1%	22.2%	19.5%	22.2%
96	May 27, 2012	19.3%	23.2%	19.2%	20.6%
97	June 3, 2012	22.1%	27.6%	20.4%	22.0%
98	June 10, 2012	18.6%	22.5%	17.2%	19.0%
99	June 17, 2012	17.1%	19.4%	17.6%	18.7%
100	June 24, 2012	19.6%	23.1%	17.6%	19.0%
101	July 1, 2012	19.0%	21.5%	17.6%	19.1%
102	July 8, 2012	19.6%	22.6%	19.3%	21.2%
103	July 15, 2012	22.6%	25.2%	20.2%	22.0%
104	July 22, 2012	20.5%	23.3%	19.2%	20.6%
105	August 5, 2012	16.2%	17.7%	17.1%	18.5%
106	August 12, 2012	21.1%	23.9%	19.5%	20.6%
107	August 19, 2012	20.1%	23.9%	18.6%	20.3%
108	August 26, 2012	18.6%	21.4%	15.8%	17.5%
109	September 2, 2012	22.7%	24.5%	19.9%	21.1%
110	September 9, 2012	22.0%	23.8%	19.9%	21.4%
111	September 16, 2012	21.4%	22.0%	19.4%	20.5%
112	September 23, 2012	19.0%	20.7%	16.9%	18.0%
113	September 30, 2012	17.3%	18.2%	15.9%	17.7%
114	October 7, 2012	18.9%	20.1%	17.8%	19.1%
115	October 14, 2012	19.4%	21.8%	18.8%	20.1%
116	October 21, 2012	19.6%	21.3%	18.4%	20.3%
117	October 28, 2012	20.9%	23.2%	19.4%	21.1%
118	November 4, 2012	21.2%	23.1%	19.6%	20.7%
119	November 11, 2012	23.3%	24.9%	20.9%	22.6%
120	November 18, 2012	22.9%	24.3%	20.7%	22.1%
121	November 25, 2012	21.8%	22.9%	18.3%	19.9%
122	December 2, 2012	20.6%	21.1%	17.7%	19.5%
123	December 9, 2012	22.2%	25.1%	20.0%	21.6%
124	December 16, 2012	23.4%	25.7%	19.0%	20.5%
125	December 23, 2012	21.0%	22.9%	17.9%	18.9%
126	December 30, 2012	22.2%	24.2%	18.1%	19.3%
