= List of Running Man episodes (2013) =

- No. of episodes: 52

Release
- Original network: SBS
- Original release: January 6 – December 29, 2013

Season chronology
- ← Previous; 2012 Next → 2014

This is a list of episodes of the South Korean variety show Running Man in 2013. The show airs on SBS as part of their Good Sunday lineup.

== Episodes ==
List of episodes (episode 127–178)
| Ep. | Broadcast Date (Filming Date) | Guest(s) | Landmark | Teams | | Mission | Results |
|---|---|---|---|---|---|---|---|
| 127 (Note: New Year's Special.) | January 6, 2013 (December 18, 2012) | Choi Ji-woo Jung Yong-hwa Lee Jong-hyun (CNBLUE) Lee Gi-kwang (Beast) Simon Dominic (Supreme Team) | Jangsado Sea Park (Jangsado, Tongyeong, South Gyeongsang Province) | Ji-woo Team (Choi Ji-woo, Yoo Jae-suk, Haha, Jee Seok-jin, Kim Jong-kook, Lee Kwang-soo) | Ji-hyo Team (Song Ji-hyo, Gary, Jung Yong-hwa, Lee Jong-hyun, Lee Gi-kwang, Simon D) | Eliminate/Protect the snake | Ji-hyo Team Wins; 100 bags of rice were donated to orphanages in Busan under Ji-hyo Team's name. |
| 128 (Note: Special appearance by announcer Kim Hwan, SBS Director of Entertainment Programming Park Jung-hoon, and model Jung Ha-eun.) | January 13, 2013 (December 30, 2012) | Park Shin-yang Uhm Ji-won | SBS Broadcasting Center (Mok-dong, Yangcheon District, Seoul) | Blue Team (Yoo Jae-suk, Jee Seok-jin, Song Ji-hyo); Green Team (Gary, Haha, Park Shin-yang); Red Team (Kim Jong-kook, Lee Kwang-soo, Uhm Ji-Won) | | Protect your bonus | Green Team, Red Team Wins; Green Team received ₩20,000, Red Team received ₩2,520,000. Red Team donated their prize money to Indonesia's Java Compassion Orphanage. |
| 129 | January 20, 2013 (January 8, 2013) | Choi Min-ho (Shinee) Jung Yong-hwa Lee Jong-hyun (CNBLUE) Kwang-hee (ZE:A) L (Infinite) Lee Joon (MBLAQ) Sulli (f(x)) | National Institute of Biological Resources (Kyeongseo-dong, Seo District, Incheon) | Running Man Team (Yoo Jae-suk, Gary, Haha, Jee Seok-jin, Kim Jong-kook, Lee Kwang-soo, Song Ji-hyo) | Idol Team (Choi Min-ho, Jung Yong-hwa, Lee Jong-hyun, Kwang-hee, L, Lee Joon, Sulli) | Defeat the other team | Running Man Team Wins; Running Man Team members each received a gold-colored name tag. |
| 130 | January 27, 2013 (January 14, 2013) | No guests | New Seoul City Hall (Jung District, Seoul) | No teams | | Find the last surviving member from 1938 and the treasure chest | Haha Wins; Haha received gold bars. |
| 131 | February 3, 2013 (January 22, 2013) | Choo Sung-hoon Lee Si-young | Yongyu Train Depot (Unseo-dong, Jung District, Incheon) | Bounty Hunting: No teams | Earn Ddakji Money Race: Blue Team (Yoo Jae-suk, Haha, Choo Sung-hoon); Green Team (Gary, Lee Kwang-soo, Song Ji-hyo); Red Team (Jee Seok-jin, Kim Jong-kook, Lee Si-young) | Defeat the other teams ddakji | Red Team Wins; Red Team received Han-u sets. |
| 132 | February 10, 2013 (January 21, 2013) | Hwang Jung-min Hyuna (4Minute) Park Sung-woong | Asiana Town (Gangseo District, Seoul) | Actor Team (Hwang Jung-min, Yoo Jae-suk, Lee Kwang-soo, Gary, Park Sung-woong) (Note: Gary was a spy infiltrated the Singer Team.) | Singer Team (Kim Jong-kook, Song Ji-hyo, Haha, Jee Seok-jin, Hyuna) (Note: Song Ji-hyo was a spy infiltrated the Actor Team.) | Deliver the seven briefcases to the boss. | Actor Team Wins; Yoo Jae-suk, Gary, Lee Kwang-soo, Hwang Jung-min, Park Sung-woong received an undisclosed prize. |
| 133 | February 17, 2013 (February 3, 2013) | Han Hye-jin Lee Dong-wook | Macau (China) | Macau International Airport/Fisherman's Wharf: Yoo Jae-suk & Haha; Gary & Song Ji-hyo; Jee Seok-jin & Lee Kwang-soo | Macau Tower/Senado Square: Yellow Team (Yoo Jae-suk, Haha, Han Hye-jin); Green Team (Gary, Song Ji-hyo, Lee Dong-wook); Blue Team (Jee Seok-jin, Kim Jong-kook, Lee Kwang-soo) | Defeat the other teams | Yellow Team Wins; Yellow Team received a golden sword. |
| 134 (Note: Asia Race Special.) | February 24, 2013 (February 4, 2013) | Han Hye-jin Lee Dong-wook | Keangnam Hanoi Landmark Tower (Hanoi, Vietnam) | Green Team (Yoo Jae-suk, Jee Seok-jin, Song Ji-hyo); Yellow Team (Gary, Haha, Han Hye-jin); Blue Team (Kim Jong-kook, Lee Kwang-soo, Lee Dong-wook) | | Defeat the other teams | Yellow Team Wins; Yellow Team received a golden sword. |
| 135 | March 3, 2013 (February 19, 2013) | Jackie Chan Siwon (Super Junior) | Kwanghee Fashion Mall (Sindang-dong, Jung District, Seoul) | Blue Team (Yoo Jae-suk, Song Ji-hyo, Jackie Chan); Red Team (Gary, Kim Jong-kook, Siwon); Green Team (Haha, Jee Seok-jin, Lee Kwang-soo) | | Throw a dart into the golden zone | Red Team Wins; Red Team received a golden boot and gifted it to Jackie as a memento. |
| 136 | March 10, 2013 (February 5, 2013) | Han Hye-jin Lee Dong-wook | Hoa Lu (Vietnam) | No teams | | Defeat the other members | Song Ji-hyo Wins |
| 137 (Note: Special appearance by child actress, Park Min-ha.) | March 17, 2013 (March 5, 2013) | Noh Sa-yeon Uee (After School) | Jo In-joo Boxing Club (Wonhyoro-dong, Yongsan District, Seoul) | Green On Dal Team (Uee, Yoo Jae-suk, Lee Kwang-soo); Blue On Dal Team (Song Ji-hyo, Gary, Haha); Orange On Dal Team (Noh Sa-yeon, Jee Seok-jin, Kim Jong-kook) | | Defeat the other princesses | Green On Dal Team Wins; Uee received a pair of gold rings, which one was given to Lee Kwang-soo. |
| 138 | March 24, 2013 (March 18, 2013) | Kim Soo-ro Kim Woo-bin Lee Jong-hyun (CNBLUE) Lee Jong-suk Min Hyo-rin | Haewon High School (Gyeongseo-dong, Seo District, Incheon) | Theatre Department (Yoo Jae-suk, Kim Soo-ro, Kim Woo-bin, Lee Jong-hyun, Lee Jong-suk, Min Hyo-rin) | Athletics Department (Kim Jong-kook, Gary, Haha, Jee Seok-jin, Lee Kwang-soo, Song Ji-hyo) | Gain control of the school flag | Theatre Department Wins |
| 139 | March 31, 2013 (March 19, 2013) | Go Ara Lee Yeon-hee | The MVL Hotel Kintex (Janghang-dong, Ilsandong District, Goyang, Gyeonggi Province) | Part 1: Yoo Jae-suk & Song Ji-hyo; Gary & Lee Yeon-hee; Haha & Lee Kwang-soo; Kim Jong-kook & Go Ara; Jee Seok-jin; Part 2: Yoo Jae-suk & Lee Kwang-soo; Gary & Lee Yeon-hee; Haha & Song Ji-hyo; Kim Jong-kook & Go Ara; Jee Seok-jin | Part 3: Mission Team (Yoo Jae-suk, Lee Yeon-hee); Chasing Team (Gary, Haha, Jee Seok-jin, Kim Jong-kook, Lee Kwang-soo, Song Ji-hyo, Go Ara) | Find the real siblings | Go Ara Wins; Go Ara received a pair of gold "R" pins, which one was given to Kim Jong-kook. |
| 140 | April 7, 2013 (March 25, 2013) | No guests | Ecoplex (Maseo-myeon, Seocheon County, South Chungcheong Province) | Mission Team (Gary, Haha, Jee Seok-jin, Kim Jong-kook, Lee Kwang-soo) | Yoo-mes Bond (Yoo Jae-suk); Culprit (Song Ji-hyo) | Find the laughing vaccine to save the world Yoo-mes Bond mission: Eliminate the culprit Culprit mission: Eliminate all members and frame Yoo Jae-suk | Yoo Jae-suk Wins |
| 141 | April 14, 2013 (April 2, 2013) | Eun Ji-won Jessica (Girls' Generation) | Everland (Yongin, Gyeonggi Province) | No teams | | Defeat the other members | Lee Kwang-soo Wins; Lee Kwang-soo received a golden crown. |
| 142 (Note: Special appearance by announcer Kim Hwan as the lottery host.) | April 21, 2013 (April 1, 2013) | Lee Bo-young Lee Sang-yoon | Gwangnaru Safety Experience Center (Neung-dong, Gwangjin District, Seoul) | Best Couple Race: Pink Team (Yoo Jae-suk, Kim Jong-kook, Lee Bo-young); Green Team (Gary, Song Ji-hyo, Lee Sang-yoon); Yellow Team (Haha, Jee Seok-jin, Lee Kwang-soo) | Couple Bells Hide and Seek: Mission Team (Yoo Jae-suk & Song Ji-hyo, Gary & Lee Sang-yoon, Jee Seok-jin & Lee Bo-young, Kim Jong-kook & Lee Kwang-soo); Chasing Team (Haha) | Stay alive within the allotted time | Haha Wins; Haha received a pair of golden bracelets. |
| 143 (Note: Special appearance by Park Hyun-bin.) | April 28, 2013 (April 15, 2013) | Kim In-kwon Lee Kyung-kyu Ryu Hyun-kyung | Seoul City Hall (Jung District, Seoul) | Orange Team (Yoo Jae-suk, Jee Seok-jin, Lee Kwang-soo, Song Ji-hyo, Lee Kyung-kyu) | Blue Team (Gary, Haha, Kim Jong-kook, Kim In-kwon, Ryu Hyun-kyung) | Receive the highest score in "Superpowers Karaoke" | Orange Team Wins; Orange Team received a gold trophy, which was given to Ryu Hyun-kyung. |
| 144 (Note: Children's Day Special.) | May 5, 2013 (April 16, 2013) | Cha In-pyo Ricky Kim Seo Jang-hoon | Namsan Elementary School Seocheon Branch (Chuncheon, Gangwon Province) | Take Off The Name Tags: No teams | Donation Angel Race: Yoo Jae-suk & Cha In-pyo; Gary & Song Ji-hyo; Haha & Seo Jang-hoon; Jee Seok-jin & Lee Kwang-soo; Kim Jong-kook & Ricky Kim | Defeat the other teams ddakji | Yoo Jae-suk & Cha In-pyo Wins; 1,000 pairs of running shoes were donated to Gangwon Child Welfare Association and Gangwon Council on Social Welfare under Yoo Jae-suk and Cha In-pyo's name. |
| 145 (Note: Special appearance by Son Ye-jin through the phone.) | May 12, 2013 (April 30, 2013) | Jeon Hye-bin Jeong Jinwoon (2AM) Kim Byung-man Noh Woo-jin Park Jung-chul | Gyeonggi English Village Paju Camp (Tanhyeon-myeon, Paju, Gyeonggi Province) | Running Man Team (Yoo Jae-suk, Gary, Jee Seok-jin, Kim Jong-kook, Lee Kwang-soo, Song Ji-hyo) | Law of the Jungle Team (Haha, Jeon Hye-bin, Jinwoon, Kim Byung-man, Noh Woo-jin, Park Jung-chul) | Defeat the other team | Law of the Jungle Team Wins; Law of the Jungle Team members each received a gold ring. |
| 146 | May 19, 2013 (May 6, 2013) | Kim Sang-kyung Uhm Jung-hwa | Wolseong Nuclear Energy Information Center (Uljin County, North Gyeongsang Province) | Detective Team 1 (Yoo Jae-suk, Song Ji-hyo, Kim Sang-kyung); Detective Team 2 (Gary, Kim Jong-kook, Uhm Jung-hwa); Betrayers Club (Haha, Jee Seok-jin, Lee Kwang-soo) | | Catch the Betrayers Club | Detective Team 1 Wins; Yoo Jae-suk, Song Ji-hyo, Kim Sang-kyung each received a gold badge. Song Ji-hyo also received the privilege to have a future episode based on her. |
| 147 | May 26, 2013 (May 13, 2013) | Kim Soo-hyun Lee Hyun-woo | Sogang University (Mapo District, Seoul) | Blue Team (Yoo Jae-suk, Lee Kwang-soo, Kim Soo-hyun); Green Team (Gary, Jee Seok-jin, Song Ji-hyo); Red Team (Haha, Kim Jong-kook, Lee Hyun-woo) | | Win in tug of war | Green Team Wins; Green Team received a gold trophy. |
| 148 | June 2, 2013 (May 27, 2013) | Jeong Jun-ha So Yi-hyun | Gapyeong Gymnasium (Gapyeong County, Gyeonggi Province) | Red Team (Yoo Jae-suk, Jee Seok-jin, Jeong Jun-ha); Blue Team (Gary, Haha, Song Ji-hyo); Yellow Team (Kim Jong-kook, Lee Kwang-soo, So Yi-hyun) | | Complete the domino | Red Team Wins; Red Team received a gold spoon. |
| 149 | June 9, 2013 (May 14, 2013) | Kim Soo-mi Kim Sook Kwon Ri-se (Ladies' Code) Park So-hyun Song Eun-i | National Folk Museum of Korea (Jongno District, Seoul) | Yoo Jae-suk & Kim Soo-mi; Gary & Park So-hyun; Haha & Song Eun-i; Jee Seok-jin & Song Ji-hyo; Kim Jong-kook & Kim Sook; Lee Kwang-soo & Kwon Ri-se (Note: During the final mission, a gumiho can take the name tag of the male members to make them a part of her team.) | | Gain nine tails to become a Gumiho | Haha & Song Eun-i Wins; Song Eun-i received a golden cintamani. |
| 150 (Note: Summer Special.) | June 16, 2013 (June 3, 2013) | Chansung Taecyeon (2PM) Choo Sung-hoon Jung Doo-hong | SQUARE1 (Dongchun-dong, Yeonsu District, Incheon) | Superhero Capability Assessment: Yoo Team (Yoo Jae-suk, Jee Seok-jin, Lee Kwang-soo); Kook Team (Kim Jong-kook, Gary, Haha, Song Ji-hyo) Final Match: Yoo Jae-suk(Captain Running Man) (Note: Impersonation of Avenger Captain America.); Kim Jong-kook(Kkuk Thor) (Note: Impersonation of Avenger Thor.); Jee Seok-Jin(Dr. Zhee) (Note: Special appearance by Kim Dong-hyun as Dr. Zhee's transformation, Hulk.); Haha(Iron Ha) (Note: Impersonation of Avenger Iron Man.); Gary(Spider Gary) (Note: Impersonation of Avenger Spider Man.); Song Ji-Hyo(Black Meong) (Note: Impersonation of Avenger Black Widow.) (Note: Black Meong literally translates Black Blank in english. 멍(meong) means blank in english.); Lee Kwang-Soo(Girin Eye) (Note: Impersonation of Avenger Hawkeye.) (Note: Girin Eye literally translates Giraffe Eye in english. 기린(girin) means giraffe in english.); Chansung and Taecyeon(Invincible Twins); Choo Sung-hoon(The Fighter); Jung Doo-hong(Master Jeong) | | Defeat the other members | Choo Sung-hoon Wins |
| 151 | June 23, 2013 (June 10, 2013) | Han Hyo-joo Jung Woo-sung Junho (2PM) | SBS Broadcasting Center (Mok-dong, Yangcheon District, Seoul) | Seocheon Order of Arrival Game: No teams | Death God Race: Running Man Team (Yoo Jae-suk, Gary, Jee Seok-jin, Kim Jong-kook, Song Ji-hyo, Han Hyo-joo, Junho); Death Note Team (Jung Woo-sung, Haha, Lee Kwang-soo) | Defeat the other team | Running Man Team Wins; Running Man Team received an undisclosed prize. |
| 152 | June 30, 2013 (June 11, 2013) | Han Hyo-joo Jung Woo-sung Junho (2PM) | Baekje Cultural Complex (Gyuam-myeon, Buyeo County, South Chungcheong Province) | Blue Team (Yoo Jae-suk, Gary, Haha, Song Ji-hyo, Jung Woo-sung) | Red Team (Jee Seok-jin, Kim Jong-kook, Lee Kwang-soo, Han Hyo-joo, Junho) | Defeat the other team | Blue Team Wins; Blue Team received a digital camera, icebox, Han-u, rice, bicycle, television, fan, grill, tent, espresso machine and sunscreen. |
| 153 (Note: Koo Ja-cheol only appears on the first day (ep 153). Patrice Evra only appears on the 2nd and 3rd day (ep 154). Special appearance by Kim Bo-kyung, Ji Dong-won, Choi Min-ho (Shinee) during the Asian Dream Cup match.) | July 7, 2013 (June 19, 2013) | Koo Ja-cheol Park Ji-sung Patrice Evra Sulli (f(x)) | Korea Polar Research Institute (Songdo-dong, Yeonsu District, Incheon) | Ji-sung Team (Park Ji-sung, Yoo Jae-suk, Gary, Haha, Sulli) | Ja-cheol Team (Koo Ja-cheol, Jee Seok-jin, Kim Jong-kook, Lee Kwang-soo, Song Ji-hyo) | Defeat the other team | Ji-sung Team Wins; Ji-sung Team received 2 2013 Asian Dream Cup invitations. |
| 154 | July 14, 2013 (June 22 & 23, 2013) | Koo Ja-cheol Park Ji-sung Patrice Evra Sulli (f(x)) | Hongkou Football Stadium (Shanghai, China) | Ji-sung Team (Park Ji-sung, Yoo Jae-suk, Gary, Haha, Sulli) | Evra Team (Patrice Evra, Jee Seok-jin, Kim Jong-kook, Lee Kwang-soo, Song Ji-hyo) | Defeat the other team | Evra Team Wins; Evra Team received 2 2013 Asian Dream Cup invitations. Park Ji-sung chose Yoo Jae-suk and Haha while Patrice Evra chose Kim Jong-kook and Lee Kwang-soo to participate in the 2013 Asian Dream Cup. |
| 155 | July 21, 2013 (July 1, 2013) | Suzy (Miss A) | Incheon National University (Yeonsu District, Incheon) | 4 Periods Graduation Race: Division 1 (Yoo Jae-suk, Haha, Kim Jong-kook, Suzy); Division 2 (Gary, Jee Seok-jin, Lee Kwang-soo, Song Ji-hyo) | Find Your Partner of Fate: Running Man Team (Yoo Jae-suk, Gary, Haha, Jee Seok-jin, Kim Jong-kook, Lee Kwang-soo); Ghost Sisters (Song Ji-hyo, Suzy) | Defeat the other team | Ghost Sisters Wins |
| 156 | July 28, 2013 (July 16, 2013) | CL Minzy Park Bom Sandara Park (2NE1); Special Guest : Taeyang (Big Bang) | Hangang Park (Yeongdeungpo District, Seoul) | Pink Team (Yoo Jae-suk, Lee Kwang-soo, Minzy, Park Bom); Orange Team (Gary, Haha, CL, Sandara Park); Green Team (Jee Seok-jin, Kim Jong-kook, Song Ji-hyo) (Note: Tae-yang teamed up with the Green Team for the missions at YG Entertainment headquarters.) | | Collect 21 litres of water | Pink Team Wins; Pink Team received a golden flying saucer, which was given to 2NE1. |
| 157 | August 4, 2013 (July 22, 2013) | Ahn Gil-kang Jung Woong-in Kim Hee-won | Tangeum Lake International Rowing Stadium (Gageum-myeon, Chungju, North Chungcheong Province) | Suspect Team (Yoo Jae-suk, Lee Kwang-soo, Ahn Gil-kang Jung Woong-in, Kim Hee-won) | Prosecutor Team (Gary, Haha, Jee Seok-jin, Kim Jong-kook, Song Ji-hyo) | Find the evidence and win the trial | Suspect Team Wins |
| 158 | August 11, 2013 (August 5, 2013) | Jeon Mi-seon Moon Jung-hee Son Hyun-joo | Goyang Aqua Studio (Deogyang District, Goyang, Gyeonggi Province) | Acupressure Mat Hopscotch: Blue Team (Yoo Jae-suk, Gary, Song Ji-hyo, Son Hyun-joo); Orange Team (Haha, Kim Jong-kook, Jeon Mi-seon); Yellow Team (Jee Seok-jin, Lee Kwang-soo, Moon Jung-hee) | Back Number Hide and Seek Race: No teams | Guess everyone's number | Son Hyun-joo Wins; Son Hyun-joo received 3 gold rings. |
| 159 | August 18, 2013 (August 7, 2013) | Jo Jung-chi (Shinchireem) John Park Jung-in Kim Kwang-kyu Kim Ye-rim Park Sang-myun Sayuri Fujita | Yangju KBS Relay Station (Hoecheon-1-dong, Yangju, Gyeonggi Province) | Yoo Jae-suk & Kim Kwang-kyu; Gary & Song Ji-hyo; Haha & Sayuri Fujita; Jee Seok-jin & Park Sang-myun; Kim Jong-kook & Kim Ye-rim; Lee Kwang-soo & John Park; Jo Jung-chi & Jung-in | | Earn gold bars and choose between the gold and your partner | Gary & Song Ji-hyo, Jo Jung-chi & Jung-in Wins; Gary received 2 gold bars. Song Ji-hyo received 6 gold bars. Jo Jung-chi received 4 gold bars. |
| 160 (Note: The guests only briefly appeared in ep 160 in the 2nd day.) | August 25, 2013 (August 19 & 20, 2013) | Andy Eric Hye-sung Jun Jin Min-woo (Shinhwa) | Daeijak Island (Ongjin-gun, Incheon) | No teams | | Solve the "Curse of 'Get' Pearl" | Shinhwa Team Wins; Shinhwa Team members received a chest of gold coins. |
| 161 | September 1, 2013 (August 20, 2013) | Andy Eric Hye-sung Jun Jin Min-woo (Shinhwa) | Seungbong Island (Ongjin-gun, Incheon) | Running Man Team (Yoo Jae-suk, Gary, Haha, Jee Seok-jin, Kim Jong-kook, Lee Kwang-soo, Song Ji-hyo) | Shinhwa Team (Andy, Eric, Hye-sung, Jun Jin, Min-woo) | Solve the "Curse of 'Get' Pearl" | Shinhwa Team Wins; Shinhwa Team members received a chest of gold coins. |
| 162 (Note: Min-ah and Yu-ra (Girl's Day) had to leave early due to scheduling conflicts.) | September 8, 2013 (August 26, 2013) | Chansung Wooyoung (2PM) Da-som Hyo-rin (Sistar) Jung Eun-ji Son Na-eun (Apink) L Sung-kyu (Infinite) Lee Gi-kwang Yoon Doo-joon (Beast) Lee Joon Seung-ho (MBLAQ) Min-ah Yu-ra (Girl's Day) | Old Cheongju Tobacco Factory (Sangdang District, Cheongju, North Chungcheong Province) | Jae-suk & Girl's Day (Yoo Jae-suk, Min-ah, Yu-ra); Gary & Apink (Gary, Son Na-eun, Jung Eun-ji); Haha & Infinite (Haha, L, Sunggyul); Seok-jin & 2PM (Jee Seok-jin, Chansung, Wooyoung); Jong-kook & Sistar (Kim Jong-kook, Hyo-rin, Da-som); Kwang-soo & MBLAQ (Lee Kwang-soo, Lee Joon, Yang Seung-ho); Ji-hyo & Beast (Song Ji-hyo, Lee Gi-kwang, Yoon Doo-joon) | | Escape the cage, solve the tangram and unlock the flag using the earned time | Ji-hyo & Beast Wins; Song Ji-hyo, Lee Gi-kwang and Yoon Doo-joon received a gold trophy. |
| 163 | September 15, 2013 (September 2, 2013) | Dae-sung G-Dragon Seung-ri (Big Bang) | Icheon Art Hall (Jungri-dong, Icheon, Gyeonggi Province) | Princess Ji-hyo (Song Ji-hyo); G-Dragon Team (G-Dragon, Yoo Jae-suk, Gary); Seung-ri Team (Seung-ri, Haha, Jee Seok-jin); Dae-sung Team (Dae-sung, Kim Jong-kook, Lee Kwang-soo) | | Have the highest cumulative number in cards | Princess Ji-hyo Wins; Song Ji-hyo received 6 gold bars. |
| 164 (Note: Chuseok Special.) (Note: Special appearance by announcer Kim Hwan as a lawyer and host.) | September 22, 2013 (September 3, 2013) | Kim Hae-sook Yoo Ah-in | Baekbul Traditional House (Dunsan-dong, Dong District, Daegu) | Hae-sook's Family (Kim Hae-sook, Yoo Jae-suk, Jee Seok-jin, Kim Jong-kook) | Ji-hyo's Family (Song Ji-hyo, Gary, Haha, Lee Kwang-soo, Yoo Ah-in) | Make the absolute dish | Ji-hyo's Family Wins; Ji-hyo's Family received a gold ladle which was given to Kim Hae-sook. |
| 165 | September 29, 2013 (September 16, 2013) | No guests | Wabu Middle School (Wabu-eup, Namyangju, Gyeonggi Province) | No teams | | Place the picture taken with the girl in the photobook | Jee Seok-jin Wins |
| 166 (Note: Special appearance by comedians Cultwo, broadcaster Im Sung-hoon, actress Park So-hyun, announcer Park Min-ji, comedian Byun Ki-soo, actor Hong Rok-ki, announcer Park Sun-young, M.I.B, chief producer Nam Seung-yong, Min-ah and Yu-ra (Girl's Day).) | October 6, 2013 (October 1, 2013) | Choi Jin-hyuk Kim Woo-bin Park Shin-hye | SBS Broadcasting Center (Mok-dong, Yangcheon District, Seoul) | RM Fashion Team (Yoo Jae-suk, Gary, Choi Jin-hyuk, Kim Woo-bin, Park Shin-hye) | RM Oil Team (Haha, Jee Seok-jin, Kim Jong-kook, Lee Kwang-soo, Song Ji-hyo) | Have a higher balance | Choi Jin-hyuk Wins; Choi Jin-hyuk received a gold nameplate. |
| 167 | October 13, 2013 (September 17, 2013) | Chun Jung-myung Kim Min-jung | National Museum of Korean Contemporary History (Jongno District, Seoul) | Punk High Team (Yoo Jae-suk, Song Ji-hyo, Chun Jung-myung); Tiger High Team (Gary, Kim Jong-kook, Kim Min-jung); Betrayal High Team (Haha, Jee Seok-jin, Lee Kwang-soo) | Secret Police (Lee Kwang-soo, Kim Min-jung) | Find the "Legendary Backpack" | Kim Min-jung Wins |
| 168 | October 20, 2013 (September 30, 2013) | IU Park Myung-soo | Suwon World Cup Stadium Swimming Pool (Paldal District, Suwon, Gyeonggi Province) | Red Team (Yoo Jae-suk, Lee Kwang-soo, IU); Blue Team (Gary, Jee Seok-jin, Song Ji-hyo); White Team (Haha, Kim Jong-kook, Park Myung-soo) | | Bet the ratio of "wolf" and "sheep" cards | Gary & Song Ji-hyo Wins; Gary and Song Ji-hyo received 9 gold bars. |
| 169 | October 27, 2013 (October 14, 2013) | Joo Sang-wook Yang Dong-geun | Mayhills Resort (Gohan-eup, Jeongseon County, Gangwon Province) | Escape the Helmet Race: No teams | Bells Hide and Seek: Defense Team (Yoo Jae-suk, Gary, Haha, Joo Sang-wook, Yang Dong-geun); Offense Team (Jee Seok-jin, Kim Jong-kook, Lee Kwang-soo, Song Ji-hyo) | Defeat the other team | Defense Team Wins; Defense Team received speciality products of Jeongseon. |
| 170 | November 3, 2013 (October 15, 2013) | Kim Yoo-jung T.O.P (Big Bang) Yoon Je-moon | Samtan Art Mine (Gohan-eup, Jeongseon County, Gangwon Province) | Dorothy Expedition Team (Yoo Jae-suk, Gary, Haha, Kim Jong-kook, Lee Kwang-soo, Song Ji-hyo, Kim Yoo-jung, T.O.P, Yoon Je-moon) | Wizard (Jee Seok-jin) | Defeat the wizard | Kim Yoo-jung Wins; Kim Yoo-jung received 3 gold rings, which 2 of those were given to T.O.P and Yoon Je-moon each. |
| 170 | November 3, 2013 (October 15, 2013) | Ryu Hyun-jin Suzy (Miss A) | Lotte Outlets Buyeo Store (Gyuam-myeon, Buyeo County, South Chungcheong Province) | Ryu Hyun-jin's Choice: No teams | Bells Hide and Seek: Running Man Team (Yoo Jae-suk, Gary, Haha, Jee Seok-jin, Kim Jong-kook, Lee Kwang-soo, Song Ji-hyo); Exo Team (Baekhyun, Chen, D.O., Kai, Kris, Lay, Lu Han, Sehun, Suho, Tao, Xiumin) | Complete the missions given by Ryu Hyun-jin | Running Man Team Wins |
| 171 (Note: Yoon Suk-min only appeared on the 1st day (ep 171) to assist in presenting a mission. Baekhyun, Chen, D.O., Kai, Kris, Lay, Lu Han, Sehun, Suho, Tao, Xiumin (Exo) only appeared on the 1st day (ep 171 and 1st half of ep 172) to compete in a mission. Ryu Hyun-jin makes a special appearance on the 1st day (ep 171) delivering missions and acted as the guest on ep 172 & 173. Suzy (Miss A) only appeared on the 2nd and 3rd day (ep 172 & 173). Lee Byung-kyu, Kim Hyun-soo, Shin Kyung-hyun only appear on the 3rd day (ep 173) to compete in a mission. Special appearance by broadcaster Heo Jun, as referee during "Superpowers Baseball" match.) | November 10, 2013 (October 29, 2013) | Ryu Hyun-jin Suzy (Miss A) | Lotte Outlets Buyeo Store (Gyuam-myeon, Buyeo County, South Chungcheong Province) | Ryu Hyun-jin's Choice: No teams | Bells Hide and Seek: Running Man Team (Yoo Jae-suk, Gary, Haha, Jee Seok-jin, Kim Jong-kook, Lee Kwang-soo, Song Ji-hyo); Exo Team (Baekhyun, Chen, D.O., Kai, Kris, Lay, Lu Han, Sehun, Suho, Tao, Xiumin) | Complete the missions given by Ryu Hyun-jin | Running Man Team Wins |
| 172 | November 17, 2013 (October 29 & November 12, 2013) | Ryu Hyun-jin Suzy (Miss A) | Lotte Outlets Buyeo Store (Gyuam-myeon, Buyeo County, South Chungcheong Province) | Ryu Hyun-jin's Choice: No teams | Bells Hide and Seek: Running Man Team (Yoo Jae-suk, Gary, Haha, Jee Seok-jin, Kim Jong-kook, Lee Kwang-soo, Song Ji-hyo); Exo Team (Baekhyun, Chen, D.O., Kai, Kris, Lay, Lu Han, Sehun, Suho, Tao, Xiumin) | Complete the missions given by Ryu Hyun-jin | Running Man Team Wins |
| 172 | November 17, 2013 (October 29 & November 12, 2013) | Ryu Hyun-jin Suzy (Miss A) | Korean Folk Village (Mokhyeon-dong, Gwangju, Gyeonggi Province) | Late Autumn MT Race: Suzy Team (Suzy, Yoo Jae-suk, Gary); Betrayers Team (Haha, Jee Seok-jin, Lee Kwang-soo); Hyun-jin Team (Ryu Hyun-jin, Kim Jong-kook, Song Ji-hyo) | MT Cooking Battle: Spy (Ryu Hyun-jin); Running Man Team (Yoo Jae-suk, Gary, Haha, Jee Seok-jin, Kim Jong-kook, Lee Kwang-soo, Song Ji-hyo, Suzy) | N/A | Haha, Kim Jong-kook, Lee Kwang-soo, Song Ji-hyo, Ryu Hyun-jin, Suzy Wins; Yoo Jae-suk, Gary, Jee Seok-jin must wash the dishes. |
| 173 | November 24, 2013 (November 12 & 13, 2013) | Ryu Hyun-jin Suzy (Miss A) | Korean Folk Village (Mokhyeon-dong, Gwangju, Gyeonggi Province) | Late Autumn MT Race: Suzy Team (Suzy, Yoo Jae-suk, Gary); Betrayers Team (Haha, Jee Seok-jin, Lee Kwang-soo); Hyun-jin Team (Ryu Hyun-jin, Kim Jong-kook, Song Ji-hyo) | MT Cooking Battle: Spy (Ryu Hyun-jin); Running Man Team (Yoo Jae-suk, Gary, Haha, Jee Seok-jin, Kim Jong-kook, Lee Kwang-soo, Song Ji-hyo, Suzy) | N/A | Haha, Kim Jong-kook, Lee Kwang-soo, Song Ji-hyo, Ryu Hyun-jin, Suzy Wins; Yoo Jae-suk, Gary, Jee Seok-jin must wash the dishes. |
| 173 | November 24, 2013 (November 12 & 13, 2013) | Ryu Hyun-jin Suzy (Miss A) | Namyangju Little Baseball Park (Namyangju, Gyeonggi Province) | Earn Superpower Money Race: No teams | Superpowers Baseball: Jae-suk Team (Yoo Jae-suk, Haha, Lee Kwang-soo, Song Ji-hyo, Kim Hyun-soo, Lee Byung-kyu); Hyun-jin Team (Ryu Hyun-jin, Gary, Jee Seok-jin, Kim Jong-kook, Suzy, Shin Kyung-hyun) | Win the "Superpowers Baseball" match | Hyun-jin Team Wins; Hyun-jin Team members each received a gold ring. |
| 174 | December 1, 2013 (November 18, 2013) | Bo-ra (Sistar) Han Hye-jin Lee Seung-gi | "R" Warehouse (Sangam-dong, Mapo District, Seoul) | Yoo Jae-suk & Han Hye-jin; Gary & Song Ji-hyo; Jee Seok-jin & Haha; Kim Jong-kook & Bo-ra; Lee Kwang-soo & Lee Seung-gi | | Solve the Number | Lee Kwang-soo & Lee Seung-gi Wins; Lee Kwang-soo and Lee Seung-gi received 5 gold bars. |
| 175 | December 8, 2013 (November 25, 2013) | Gong Yoo Park Hee-soon | POSCO Green Building (Songdo-dong, Yeonsu District, Incheon) | Point Out the Suspect Race: Red Team (Yoo Jae-suk, Lee Kwang-soo, Gong Yoo); Green Team (Gary, Jee Seok-jin, Song Ji-hyo); Blue Team (Haha, Kim Jong-kook, Park Hee-soon) | Take Off the Target Name Tags: No teams | Defeat the other members | Haha Wins; Haha received a golden card leaving the entire members locked in prison. |
| 176 (Note: Song Ji-hyo only acted as host and did not participate in the race.) | December 15, 2013 (November 26, 2013) | Jang Ki-ha Jun Hyun-moo Kim Kwang-kyu Lee Juck Muzie | SBS Broadcasting Center (Mok-dong, Yangcheon District, Seoul) | 11-Person Trendy Men Team (Yoo Jae-suk, Gary, Haha, Jee Seok-jin, Kim Jong-kook, Lee Kwang-soo, Jang Ki-ha, Jun Hyun-moo, Kim Kwang-kyu, Lee Juck, Muzie) | | Guess the survey's rankings | 11-Person Trendy Men Team Wins; 11-Person Trendy Men Team members each received a gold coin. |
| 177 (Note: Christmas Special.) (Note: Special appearance by Choiza, Gaeko (Dynamic Duo), Jo Jung-chi (Shinchireem), Jung Eun-ji, Park Cho-rong, Yoon Bo-mi (Apink), Jung-in.) | December 22, 2013 (December 9, 2013) | Gil (Leessang) | NAVER Green Factory (Jeongja-dong, Bundang District, Seongnam, Gyeonggi Province) | Blue Team (Yoo Jae-suk, Jee Seok-jin); Red Team (Haha, Kim Jong-kook); Yellow Team (Lee Kwang-soo, Song Ji-hyo) | Leessang Team (Gary, Gil) | Stand on the platform | Leessang Team Wins; Gary and Gil received 7 gold bars. |
| 178 (Note: Year-End Special.) (Note: Special appearance by announcer Kim Hwan.) | December 29, 2013 (December 10, 2013) | No guests | Hangang Park (Mapo District, Seoul) | Running Man Team | Production Team | Earn the Running Balls | Production Team Wins; Due to the production staffs' mistake, the Production Team got water-bombed instead of the Running Man Team. |

== Ratings ==
- Ratings listed below are the individual corner ratings of Running Man. (Note: Individual corner ratings do not include commercial time, which regular ratings include.)

| Ep. # | Original Airdate | TNmS Ratings | | Naver Ratings | |
| Ep. # | Original Airdate | Nationwide | Seoul Capital Area | Nationwide | Seoul Capital Area |
|---|---|---|---|---|---|
| 127 | January 6, 2013 | 20.2% | 22.0% | 19.9% | 21.6% |
| 128 | January 13, 2013 | 20.5% | 22.4% | 19.4% | 21.2% |
| 129 | January 20, 2013 | 19.1% | 21.1% | 18.4% | 20.1% |
| 130 | January 27, 2013 | 19.8% | 21.2% | 19.5% | 21.7% |
| 131 | February 3, 2013 | 23.6% | 25.9% | 20.4% | 22.2% |
| 132 | February 10, 2013 | 15.4% | 16.3% | 14.2% | 15.3% |
| 133 | February 17, 2013 | 23.1% | 24.6% | 21.0% | 22.7% |
| 134 | February 24, 2013 | 19.9% | 21.2% | 17.3% | 18.6% |
| 135 | March 3, 2013 | 19.9% | 21.9% | 19.1% | 21.0% |
| 136 | March 10, 2013 | 19.5% | 21.2% | 20.4% | 22.6% |
| 137 | March 17, 2013 | 18.5% | 20.3% | 18.4% | 20.3% |
| 138 | March 24, 2013 | 19.8% | 21.7% | 19.6% | 21.5% |
| 139 | March 31, 2013 | 18.1% | 20.3% | 18.4% | 20.4% |
| 140 | April 7, 2013 | 17.2% | 19.0% | 16.6% | 18.7% |
| 141 | April 14, 2013 | 17.2% | 18.3% | 18.1% | 19.4% |
| 142 | April 21, 2013 | 15.3% | 15.7% | 17.5% | 19.0% |
| 143 | April 28, 2013 | 14.5% | 15.5% | 15.3% | 17.1% |
| 144 | May 5, 2013 | 11.9% | 12.7% | 12.7% | 13.8% |
| 145 | May 12, 2013 | 13.4% | 13.6% | 14.6% | 15.5% |
| 146 | May 19, 2013 | 12.4% | 12.7% | 14.5% | 15.4% |
| 147 | May 26, 2013 | 15.0% | 15.4% | 17.0% | 19.6% |
| 148 | June 2, 2013 | 12.9% | 13.2% | 13.7% | 14.8% |
| 149 | June 9, 2013 | 12.4% | 12.8% | 12.8% | 13.8% |
| 150 | June 16, 2013 | 10.7% | 11.3% | 11.4% | 11.6% |
| 151 | June 23, 2013 | 11.7% | 12.0% | 12.4% | 13.2% |
| 152 | June 30, 2013 | 13.2% | 14.2% | 13.6% | 14.7% |
| 153 | July 7, 2013 | 13.2% | 13.4% | 14.5% | 15.6% |
| 154 | July 14, 2013 | 15.6% | 17.2% | 15.0% | 16.2% |
| 155 | July 21, 2013 | 13.1% | 13.7% | 13.2% | 14.5% |
| 156 | July 28, 2013 | 12.5% | 13.5% | 13.0% | 14.5% |
| 157 | August 4, 2013 | 11.8% | 12.4% | 9.8% | 10.0% |
| 158 | August 11, 2013 | 11.6% | 12.4% | 11.7% | 11.7% |
| 159 | August 18, 2013 | 13.9% | 15.1% | 14.3% | 15.7% |
| 160 | August 25, 2013 | 12.1% | 12.7% | 12.3% | 12.4% |
| 161 | September 1, 2013 | 10.9% | 11.6% | 11.3% | 11.9% |
| 162 | September 8, 2013 | 12.2% | 12.8% | 13.6% | 13.9% |
| 163 | September 15, 2013 | 11.6% | 12.7% | 12.0% | 12.9% |
| 164 | September 22, 2013 | 13.2% | 13.5% | 14.1% | 14.2% |
| 165 | September 29, 2013 | 12.3% | 13.1% | 13.5% | 13.8% |
| 166 | October 6, 2013 | 11.9% | 12.6% | 12.3% | 13.2% |
| 167 | October 13, 2013 | 11.2% | 12.0% | 11.7% | 12.5% |
| 168 | October 20, 2013 | 12.1% | 13.7% | 12.6% | 13.6% |
| 169 | October 27, 2013 | 10.7% | 11.8% | 12.1% | 13.2% |
| 170 | November 3, 2013 | 11.8% | 13.2% | 11.5% | 12.0% |
| 171 | November 10, 2013 | 13.1% | 14.1% | 14.3% | 15.7% |
| 172 | November 17, 2013 | 12.2% | 12.9% | 12.5% | 13.5% |
| 173 | November 24, 2013 | 13.9% | 15.5% | 14.4% | 15.9% |
| 174 | December 1, 2013 | 12.5% | 14.2% | 13.3% | 14.5% |
| 175 | December 8, 2013 | 11.5% | 13.4% | 13.2% | 14.8% |
| 176 | December 15, 2013 | 11.6% | 13.2% | 13.3% | 14.0% |
| 177 | December 22, 2013 | 11.6% | 13.4% | 12.3% | 12.7% |
| 178 | December 29, 2013 | 11.6% | 13.2% | 13.8% | 15.6% |
