= Heo Jun (disambiguation) =

Heo Jun (1539–1615) was a court physician of the Joseon Dynasty in Korea.

Heo Jun may also refer to:

- Hur Jun (TV series), a South Korean television series
- Hur Jun, the Original Story, a South Korean television series
- 72059 Heojun, a main-belt asteroid
- Heo Jun (television personality) (born 1977), South Korean television personality
- Heo Jun (fencer) (born 1988), South Korean fencer
