= List of Running Man episodes (2010) =

- No. of episodes: 23

Release
- Original network: SBS
- Original release: July 11 – December 26, 2010

Season chronology
- ← Previous; N/A Next → 2011

This is a list of episodes of the South Korean variety show Running Man in 2010. The show airs on SBS as part of their Good Sunday lineup.

== Episodes ==
List of episodes (episode 1–23)
Ep.	Broadcast Date (Filming Date)	Guest(s)	Landmark	Teams		Mission	Results
1	July 11, 2010 (June 18 and June 21, 2010)	Hwang Jung-eum, Lee Hyo-ri	Times Square (Yeongdeungpo District, Seoul)	Expensive Team (Yoo Jae-suk, Kim Jong-kook, Lee Kwang-soo, Song Joong-ki, Hwang Jung-eum)	Cheap Team (Gary, Haha, Jee Seok-jin, Lee Hyo-ri)	Find the secret code	Expensive Team Wins; Haha and Jee Seok-jin works as greeters the next morning.
2	July 18, 2010 (July 5, 2010)	Goo Hara (Kara), Lee Chun-hee, Song Ji-hyo	Suwon World Cup Stadium (Paldal District, Suwon, Gyeonggi Province)	Away Team (Yoo Jae-suk, Gary, Haha, Lee Kwang-soo, Song Ji-hyo)	Home Team (Jee Seok-jin, Kim Jong-kook, Song Joong-ki, Goo Ha-ra, Lee Chun-hee)	Find the Golden Pigs with money	Home Team Wins; Away Team serves free coffee to employees.
3	July 25, 2010 (July 5, 2010)	Goo Hara (Kara), Lee Chun-hee, Song Ji-hyo	Suwon World Cup Stadium (Paldal District, Suwon, Gyeonggi Province)	Away Team (Yoo Jae-suk, Gary, Haha, Lee Kwang-soo, Song Ji-hyo)	Home Team (Jee Seok-jin, Kim Jong-kook, Song Joong-ki, Goo Ha-ra, Lee Chun-hee)	Find the Golden Pigs with money	Home Team Wins; Away Team serves free coffee to employees.
4	August 1, 2010 (July 18, 2010)	Jessica Jung (Girls' Generation), Nichkhun (2PM), Song Ji-hyo	Gwacheon National Science Museum (Gwacheon, Gyeonggi Province)	Adult Team (Yoo Jae-suk, Jee Seok-jin, Lee Kwang-soo, Nichkhun, Song Ji-hyo)	Child Team (Gary, Haha, Kim Jong-kook, Song Joong-ki, Jessica)	Find the Golden Pigs with money	Child Team Wins; Adult Team cleans up the museum.
5	August 8, 2010 (July 18, 2010)	Jessica Jung (Girls' Generation), Nichkhun (2PM), Song Ji-hyo	Gwacheon National Science Museum (Gwacheon, Gyeonggi Province)	Adult Team (Yoo Jae-suk, Jee Seok-jin, Lee Kwang-soo, Nichkhun, Song Ji-hyo)	Child Team (Gary, Haha, Kim Jong-kook, Song Joong-ki, Jessica)	Find the Golden Pigs with money	Child Team Wins; Adult Team cleans up the museum.
6 (Note: Song Ji-hyo is an official member as of this episode, but was unable to attend due to scheduling conflicts.)	August 15, 2010 (August 2, 2010)	Kim Shin-young, Se7en, Son Dam-bi	N Seoul Tower (Jung District, Seoul)	Adult Team (Yoo Jae-suk, Jee Seok-jin, Lee Kwang-soo, Se7en, Son Dam-bi)	Child Team (Gary, Haha, Kim Jong-kook, Song Joong-ki, Kim Shin-young)	Earn the Running Balls	Child Team Wins; Adult Team gets drawn on their face and must take the bus home without showering.
7 (Note: Song Ji-hyo's first episode as a member) (Note: Lee Kwang-soo was unable to attend due to drama filming. He appeared during Mission 3 (Leisure Time for a Cup of Tea).)	August 22, 2010 (August 9, 2010)	Ham Eun-jung (T-ara), Jo Kwon (2AM), Jung Yong-hwa (CNBLUE)	Sejong Center for the Performing Arts (Jongno District, Seoul)	Blue Team (Yoo Jae-suk, Jee Seok-jin, Lee Kwang-soo, Song Ji-hyo, Jo Kwon, Jung Yong-hwa)	Red Team (Gary, Haha, Kim Jong-kook, Song Joong-ki, Ham Eun-jung)	Earn the Running Balls	Blue Team Wins; Red Team gets drawn on their face and must take the subway to Yeouido Station without showering.
8 (Note: Song Joong-ki was unable to attend due to scheduling conflicts.)	August 29, 2010 (August 16, 2010)	Lee Joon (MBLAQ), Park Jun-gyu, Victoria (f(x))	Seoul Museum of History, Gyeonghuigung (Jongno District, Seoul)	Blue Team (Yoo Jae-suk, Jee Seok-jin, Lee Kwang-soo, Song Ji-hyo, Lee Joon)	Red Team (Gary, Haha, Kim Jong-kook, Park Jun-gyu, Victoria)	Earn the Running Balls	Red Team Wins; Blue Team wears hotpants, gets drawn on their face, and must take the bus home.
9	September 5, 2010 (August 22, 2010)	Lee Hong-gi (F.T. Island), Kim Soo-ro, Shin Bong-sun	Lotte World (Sincheon-dong, Songpa District, Seoul)	Blue Team (Yoo Jae-suk, Jee Seok-jin, Lee Kwang-soo, Song Ji-hyo, Kim Soo-ro)	Red Team (Gary, Haha, Kim Jong-kook, Lee Hong-gi, Shin Bong-sun)	Earn the Running Balls	Blue Team Wins; Red Team wears hotpants and carnival attire, gets drawn on their face, and must walk home.
10	September 12, 2010 (August 30, 2010)	Cha Tae-hyun, Yoon Se-ah	National Museum of Modern and Contemporary Art (Gwacheon, Gyeonggi Province	Blue Team (Yoo Jae-suk, Jee Seok-jin, Lee Kwang-soo, Song Ji-hyo, Cha Tae-hyun)	Red Team (Gary, Haha, Kim Jong-kook, Song Joong-ki, Yoon Se-ah)	Earn the Running Balls	Red Team Wins; Blue Team dresses up and goes to a convenience store in Hongdae to eat instant noodles. (Note: Song Ji-hyo was exempted from the punishment because she won a "Punishment Escape" card.)
11	September 19, 2010 (September 6, 2010)	Jung Yong-hwa (CNBLUE), Kim Je-dong	Seoul Central Post Office (Jung District, Seoul)	Blue Team (Yoo Jae-suk, Jee Seok-jin, Lee Kwang-soo, Song Ji-hyo, Jung Yong-hwa)	Red Team (Gary, Haha, Kim Jong-kook, Kim Je-dong)	Individually earn Running Balls	Haha, Jee Seok-jin, Song Ji-hyo, Jung Yong-hwa, Kim Je-dong Wins; Yoo Jae-suk, Gary, Kim Jong-kook, Lee Kwang-soo wears hotpants and must take the bus home.
12 (Note: Due to drama filming, it was announced that Song Joong-ki will only appear every other week.)	September 26, 2010 (September 19, 2010)	No guests	Seoul Design Fair @ Seoul Olympic Stadium (Songpa District, Seoul)	Mission Team (Yoo Jae-suk, Jee Seok-jin, Lee Kwang-soo, Song Joong-ki, Song Ji-hyo)	Chasing Team (Gary, Haha, Kim Jong-kook)	Individually earn Running Balls	Gary, Haha, Kim Jong-kook, Song Ji-hyo Wins; Yoo Jae-suk, Jee Seok-jin, Lee Kwang-soo must wear hotpants to get coffee and during next show opening; Song Joong-ki wore hotpants to the next recording at his drama set.
13	October 3, 2010 (September 20, 2010)	Jang Dong-min, Lizzy (After School)	SBS Broadcasting Center (Mok-dong, Yangcheon District, Seoul)	Mission Team (Yoo Jae-suk, Jee Seok-jin, Lee Kwang-soo, Song Ji-hyo, Lizzy)	Chasing Team (Gary, Haha, Kim Jong-kook, Jang Dong-min)	Individually earn Running Balls	Yoo Jae-suk, Gary, Jee Seok-jin, Lee Kwang-soo, Song Ji-hyo Wins; Haha, Kim Jong-kook, Jang Dong-min, Lizzy wears hanbok and participates in a live broadcast of Morning Wide.
14	October 17, 2010 (September 27, 2010)	Lizzy (After School)	Boramae Safety Experience Center (Dongjak District, Seoul)	Mission Team (Haha, Kim Jong-kook, Lee Kwang-soo, Song Joong-ki, Lizzy)	Chasing Team (Yoo Jae-suk, Gary, Jee Seok-jin, Song Ji-hyo)	Individually earn Running Balls	Haha, Jee Seok-jin, Lee Kwang-soo, Song Ji-hyo, Lizzy Wins; Yoo Jae-suk, Gary, Kim Jong-kook, Song Joong-ki wears hotpants to eat at Soondae Town in Sillim-dong.
15	October 24, 2010 (October 4, 2010)	Kim Kwang-kyu, Tony An	Seoul Metro Subway Yard (Deogyang District, Goyang, Gyeonggi Province)	Mission Team (Yoo Jae-suk, Jee Seok-jin, Song Ji-hyo, Kim Kwang-kyu, Tony An)	Chasing Team (Gary, Haha, Kim Jong-kook, Lee Kwang-soo, Song Joong-ki)	Individually earn Running Balls	Haha, Jee Seok-jin, Kim Jong-kook, Lee Kwang-soo, Song Joong-ki Wins; Yoo Jae-suk, Gary, Tony Ahn wears hotpants, Kim Kwang-kyu wears long pants, Song Ji-hyo wears a moustache and must take the subway home.
16	October 31, 2010 (October 11, 2010)	Yuri (Girls' Generation)	I'Park Mall (Yongsan District, Seoul)	Eat Samples and Gain 1 kg!: Song Ji-hyo and Two Middle-Aged Men Team (Song Ji-hyo, Yoo Jae-suk, Jee Seok-jin); Kim Jong-kook and his Two Kids Team (Kim Jong-kook, Gary, Haha); Youthful Boys and Girls Team (Lee Kwang-soo, Song Joong-ki, Yuri)	Bells Hide and Seek: Mission Team (Yoo Jae-suk, Gary, Haha, Song Joong-ki, Song Ji-hyo); Chasing Team (Jee Seok-jin, Kim Jong-kook, Lee Kwang-soo, Yuri)	Individually earn Running Balls	Yoo Jae-suk, Haha, Jee Seok-jin, Song Joong-ki, Song Ji-hyo Wins; Gary, Kim Jong-kook, Lee Kwang-soo wears hotpants, Yuri wears a moustache and visit the Noryangjin Fisheries Wholesale Market.
17	November 7, 2010 (October 25, 2010)	Go Joo-won, Jung Yong-hwa (CNBLUE)	Hanyang Women's University (Seongdong District, Seoul)	Perform the Band Songs!: Jae-suk Team (Yoo Jae-suk, Jung Yong-hwa, Go Joo-won); Seok-jin Team (Jee Seok-jin, Lee Kwang-soo, Song Joong-ki); Jong-kook Team (Kim Jong-kook, Gary, Haha, Song Ji-hyo)	Bells Hide and Seek: Mission Team (Yoo Jae-suk, Jee Seok-jin, Lee Kwang-soo, Song Joong-ki, Jung Yong-hwa); Chasing Team (Gary, Haha, Kim Jong-kook, Song Ji-hyo, Go Joo-won)	Individually earn Running Balls	Haha, Kim Jong-kook, Lee Kwang-soo, Song Ji-hyo, Jung Yong-hwa Wins; Yoo Jae-suk, Gary, Jee Seok-jin, Song Joong-ki, Go Joo-won wears hotpants designed by students at the university, and go eat ddeokbokki in Sindang-dong.
18 (Note: Lizzy's first episode as a member.)	November 21, 2010 (November 13, 2010)	Lizzy (After School)	Busan International Cruise Ship @ Gwangan Bridge (Haeundae District, Busan)	Mission Team (Yoo Jae-suk, Jee Seok-jin, Lee Kwang-soo, Song Joong-ki, Song Ji-hyo, Lizzy)	Chasing Team (Gary, Haha, Kim Jong-kook)	Individually earn Running Balls	Gary, Haha, Kim Jong-kook, Song Ji-hyo, Lizzy Wins; Yoo Jae-suk, Jee Seok-jin, Lee Kwang-soo, Song Joong-ki wears hotpants and greets tourists at Busan International Cruise Terminal. (Note: No lottery takes place, those without Running Balls are punished.)
19	November 28, 2010 (November 8, 2010)	Nichkhun (2PM), Lizzy (After School)	Namsangol Hanok Village (Jung District, Seoul)	Korean Food Contest: Red Team (Yoo Jae-suk, Jee Seok-jin, Lizzy); Blue Team (Gary, Haha, Kim Jong-kook, Nichkhun); Yellow Team (Lee Kwang-soo, Song Joong-ki, Song Ji-hyo)	Bells Hide and Seek: Mission Team (Yoo Jae-suk, Gary, Haha, Jee Seok-jin, Lee Kwang-soo, Song Joong-ki, Song Ji-hyo, Lizzy, Nichkhun); Chasing Team (Kim Jong-kook) (Note: Special 1 vs. 9 Race Mission: Kim Jong-kook vs. remaining 9 members.)	Individually earn Running Balls	Gary, Haha, Kim Jong-kook, Nichkhun Wins; Yoo Jae-suk, Jee Seok-jin, Lee Kwang-soo and Song Joong-ki wears hotpants, Song Ji-hyo and Lizzy wears a moustache, and gives free hugs to citizens (movie set for Lee Kwang-soo).
20	December 5, 2010 (November 22, 2010)	Kim Hee-chul (Super Junior)	Korea Meteorological Administration (Dongjak District, Seoul)	Mission Team (Yoo Jae-suk, Jee Seok-jin, Lee Kwang-soo, Song Ji-hyo, Kim Hee-chul)	Chasing Team (Gary, Haha, Kim Jong-kook, Lizzy)	Individually earn Running Balls	Yoo Jae-suk, Gary, Haha, Kim Jong-kook, Lizzy, Kim Hee-chul Wins; Jee Seok-jin, Lee Kwang-soo wears hotpants, Song Ji-hyo wears a moustache, and goes jogging at a park.
21	December 12, 2010 (November 29, 2010)	Kim Je-dong	Gwangmyeong Station (Gyeonggi Province, Gwangmyeong)	Run Running Man!: Yellow Team (Yoo Jae-suk, Jee Seok-jin, Kim Je-dong); Blue Team (Gary, Haha, Kim Jong-kook, Lizzy); Red Team (Lee Kwang-soo, Song Joong-ki, Song Ji-hyo)	Bells Hide and Seek: Mission Team (Yoo Jae-suk, Gary, Haha, Jee Seok-jin, Lee Kwang-soo, Song Joong-ki, Lizzy, Kim Je-dong); Chasing Team (Kim Jong-kook, Song Ji-hyo)	Individually earn Running Balls	Gary, Haha, Kim Jong-kook, Song Ji-hyo, Lizzy, Kim Je-dong Wins; Yoo Jae-suk, Jee Seok-jin, Lee Kwang-soo, Song Joong-ki wears hotpants to the Christmas Special recording.
22 (Note: Christmas Special)	December 19, 2010 (December 6, 2010)	Choi Si-won (Super Junior), Kim Min-jong	Lotte Mart (Gwangjin District, Seoul)	Christmas Presents: White Team (Yoo Jae-suk, Jee Seok-jin, Choi Si-won, Kim Min-jong); Red Team (Gary, Haha, Song Ji-hyo); Green Team (Kim Jong-kook, Lee Kwang-soo, Song Joong-ki, Lizzy)	Bells Hide and Seek: Mission Team (Jee Seok-jin, Kim Jong-kook, Lee Kwang-soo, Song Joong-ki, Song Ji-hyo, Lizzy); Chasing Team (Yoo Jae-suk, Gary, Haha, Kim Min-jong, Si-won)	Individually earn Running Balls	Yoo Jae-suk, Gary, Haha, Kim Jong-kook, Song Joong-ki, Kim Min-jong, Si-won Wins; Jee Seok-jin, Lee Kwang-soo wears hotpants, and Song Ji-hyo, Lizzy wears a moustache, and give presents to citizens at a subway station.
23 (Note: Year-End Special)	December 26, 2010 (December 13 and 14, 2010)	Shim Hyung-rae	Alpensia Ski Resort (Pyeongchang County, Gangwon)	Lift Quiz: Red Team (Yoo Jae-suk, Lee Kwang-soo, Shim Hyung-rae); Blue Team (Gary, Haha, Kim Jong-kook, Lizzy); Yellow Team (Jee Seok-jin, Song Joong-ki, Song Ji-hyo)	Bells Hide and Seek: Mission Team (Yoo Jae-suk, Gary, Jee Seok-jin, Song Joong-ki, Song Ji-hyo, Lizzy, Shim Hyung-rae); Chasing Team (Haha, Kim Jong-kook, Lee Kwang-soo)	Individually earn Running Balls	Haha, Jee Seok-jin, Kim Jong-kook, Lee Kwang-soo, Song Joong-ki, Song Ji-hyo, Shim Hyung-rae Wins; Yoo Jae-suk, Gary wears hotpants and Lizzy go skiing to cheer for Pyeongchang as the host of the 2018 Winter Olympics.

== Ratings ==
- Good Sunday divides its program into two parts, Running Man airs as Good Sunday Part 1.

Ep. #	Original Airdate	TNmS Ratings		Naver Ratings	
Ep. #	Original Airdate	Nationwide	Seoul Capital Area	Nationwide	Seoul Capital Area
1	July 11, 2010	12.0%	12.5%	10.0%	10.7%
2	July 18, 2010	8.0%	8.1%	7.8%	8.7%
3	July 25, 2010	6.7%	7.8%	7.4%	8.1%
4	August 1, 2010	7.8%	8.6%	6.3%	7.0%
5	August 8, 2010	8.0%	8.9%	7.3%	8.8%
6	August 15, 2010	7.6%	7.9%	7.8%	8.5%
7	August 22, 2010	8.4%	9.3%	6.6%	7.7%
8	August 29, 2010	8.4%	8.9%	7.9%	8.1%
9	September 5, 2010	9.3%	9.5%	7.4%	8.2%
10	September 12, 2010	7.8%	8.2%	6.6%	6.8%
11	September 19, 2010	8.2%	8.5%	7.0%	7.9%
12	September 26, 2010	6.7%	6.8%	5.6%	6.5%
13	October 3, 2010	7.0%	7.2%	7.1%	8.1%
14	October 17, 2010	11.1%	11.8%	8.8%	8.8%
15	October 24, 2010	13.2%	14.1%	11.1%	11.4%
16	October 31, 2010	11.0%	11.5%	10.3%	11.0%
17	November 7, 2010	13.2%	14.1%	9.8%	10.2%
18	November 21, 2010	10.3%	10.8%	8.9%	9.5%
19	November 28, 2010	13.2%	14.0%	9.3%	9.9%
20	December 5, 2010	11.8%	12.6%	9.3%	9.8%
21	December 12, 2010	12.7%	13.7%	11.2%	12.1%
22	December 19, 2010	13.2%	14.2%	10.6%	11.1%
23	December 26, 2010	12.6%	13.9%	10.7%	11.6%
