= List of Running Man episodes (2011) =

- No. of episodes: 51

Release
- Original network: SBS
- Original release: January 2 – December 25, 2011

Season chronology
- ← Previous; 2010 Next → 2012

This is a list of episodes of the South Korean variety show Running Man in 2011. The show airs on SBS as part of their Good Sunday lineup.

== Episodes ==
List of episodes (episode 24–74)
Ep.	Broadcast Date (Filming Date)	Guest(s)	Landmark	Teams		Mission	Results
24 (Note: New Year's Special.) (Note: Song Joong-ki was unable to attend due to schedule conflicts.)	January 2, 2011 (December 20, 2010)	Lee Kyung-shil, Song Eun-i	Xi Wi City (Ilsandong-gu, Goyang, Gyeonggi-do)	Collect Recyclables!: Red Team (Yoo Jae-suk, Jee Seok-jin, Lee Kyung-shil); Yellow Team (Gary, Song Ji-hyo, Song Eun-yi); Blue Team (Haha, Kim Jong-kook, Lee Kwang-soo, Lizzy); Raise the Heartbeat: Male Team (Yoo Jae-suk, Gary, Haha, Jee Seok-jin, Kim Jong-kook, Lee Kwang-soo); Female Team (Song Ji-hyo, Lizzy, Lee Kyung-shil, Song Eun-i)	Bells Hide and Seek: Sons Team (Yoo Jae-suk, Gary, Haha, Jee Seok-jin, Lee Kwang-soo); Mothers Team (Kim Jong-kook, Song Ji-hyo, Lizzy, Lee Kyung-shil, Song Eun-i)	Earn the Running Balls	Kim Jong-kook, Lee Kwang-soo, Song Ji-hyo, Lizzy, Song Eun-i Wins; Yoo Jae-suk, Gary, Haha, Jee Seok-jin, Lee Kyung-shil wears red long underwear and goes jogging.
25 (Note: Lizzy's last episode as a member.)	January 9, 2011 (December 27, 2010)	Park Bo-young	Museum Comics Information Center (Gyeonggi Province, Bucheon)	Come to the Manhwa Room!: White Team (Yoo Jae-suk, Jee Seok-jin, Song Joong-ki, Park Bo-young); Red Team (Gary, Haha, Song Ji-hyo); Blue Team (Kim Jong-kook, Lee Kwang-soo, Lizzy)	Bells Hide and Seek: Red Riding Hood Team (Yoo Jae-suk, Jee Seok-jin, Lee Kwang-soo, Song Joong-ki, Song Ji-hyo, Lizzy, Park Bo-young); Wolf Team (Gary, Haha, Kim Jong-kook)	Earn the Running Balls	Yoo Jae-suk, Gary, Haha, Jee Seok-jin, Kim Jong-kook, Song Joong-ki, Park Bo-young Wins (Note: No lottery takes place, those without Running Balls are punished.); Lee Kwang-soo, Song Ji-hyo, Lizzy wears red long underwear and receives a caricature.
26 (Note: Special appearance by Lee Joon-ik.)	January 16, 2011 (January 3, 2011)	Jung Jin-young, Lee Moon-sik	Nakwon Instruments Shopping Center (Insa-dong, Jongno District, Seoul)	Find the Guests: Mission Team (Jung Jin-young, Lee Moon-sik); Red Team (Yoo Jae-suk, Haha, Jee Seok-jin); Yellow Team (Gary, Song Ji-hyo, Song Joong-ki); Blue Team (Kim Jong-kook, Lee Kwang-soo); World Music: Red Team (Yoo Jae-suk, Haha, Jee Seok-jin); Yellow Team (Gary, Song Ji-hyo, Song Joong-ki); Blue Team (Kim Jong-kook, Lee Kwang-soo, Jung Jin-young, Lee Moon-sik)	Choose One of Two: Red Team (Yoo Jae-suk, Gary, Jee Seok-jin, Song Ji-hyo); Blue Team (Haha, Kim Jong-kook, Lee Kwang-soo, Song Joong-ki)	Earn the Running Balls	Haha, Kim Jong-kook, Lee Kwang-soo, Song Joong-ki, Jung Jin-young, Lee Moon-sik Wins; Yoo Jae-suk, Gary, Jee Seok-jin, Song Ji-hyo wears red long underwear and must take the bus to the next recording at Seoul Arts Center.
27	January 23, 2011 (January 10, 2011)	Max Changmin, U-Know Yunho (TVXQ)	Seoul Arts Center (Seocho District, Seoul)	Find the Guests: Mission Team (Max Changmin, U-Know Yunho); Chasing Team (Yoo Jae-suk, Gary, Haha, Jee Seok-jin, Kim Jong-kook, Lee Kwang-soo, Song Joong-ki, Song Ji-hyo)	Drawing Relay: Jae-suk Team (Yoo Jae-suk, Jee Seok-jin, Lee Kwang-soo, Song Joong-ki, Max Changmin); Jong-kook Team (Kim Jong-kook, Gary, Haha, Song Ji-hyo, U-Know Yunho)	Earn the Running Balls	Everyone Wins (Note: The members successfully completed the One Chance challenge and they all win and escape punishment regardless of Running Balls.)
28 (Note: Seollal Special.)	January 30, 2011 (January 17, 2011)	Kim Byung-man	Ansung Natural Resort (Juksan-myeon, Anseong, Gyeonggi Province)	Find the Guests: Mission Team (Kim Byung-man); Chasing Team (Yoo Jae-suk, Gary, Haha, Jee Seok-jin, Kim Jong-kook, Lee Kwang-soo, Song Joong-ki, Song Ji-hyo)	Diet Karaoke: Yellow Team (Yoo Jae-suk, Jee Seok-jin, Song Joong-ki); Red Team (Gary, Kim Jong-kook, Song Ji-hyo); Blue Team (Haha, Lee Kwang-soo, Kim Byung-man)	Earn the Running Balls	Gary, Haha, Lee Kwang-soo, Song Joong-ki, Song Ji-hyo Wins; Yoo Jae-suk, Jee Seok-jin, Kim Jong-kook, Kim Byung-man wears red long underwear and receives a massage.
29 (Note: New Year's Project - Membership Training: Who is the "Center of Power"? (Special Race Mission: Yoo Jae-suk vs. Kim Jong-kook))	February 6, 2011 (January 24, 2011)	No guests	COEX Aquarium (Gangnam District, Seoul)	Jae-suk Team (Yoo Jae-suk, Gary, Jee Seok-jin, Lee Kwang-soo) (Note: Teams were decided by Yoo Jae-suk and Kim Jong-kook in a Van Race, where they drove in a van to pick up members to join their team.)	Jong-kook Team (Kim Jong-kook, Haha, Song Joong-ki, Song Ji-hyo)	Earn the Running Balls	Everyone Wins
30	February 13, 2011 (January 31, 2011)	Seung-ri (Big Bang)	The National Center for Korean Traditional Performing Arts (Seocho District, Seoul)	Mission Team (Seung-ri)	Chasing Team (Yoo Jae-suk, Gary, Haha, Jee Seok-jin, Kim Jong-kook, Lee Kwang-soo, Song Joong-ki, Song Ji-hyo)	Earn the Running Balls	Everyone Wins
31	February 20, 2011 (February 9, 2011)	Hyun Young	Alpensia Ocean 700 Water Park (Pyeongchang County, Gangwon)	Find the Guests: Mission Team (Hyun Young); Chasing Team (Yoo Jae-suk, Gary, Haha, Jee Seok-jin, Kim Jong-kook, Lee Kwang-soo, Song Joong-ki, Song Ji-hyo)	Water Microphone Karaoke: Yellow Team (Yoo Jae-suk, Jee Seok-jin, Lee Kwang-soo, Song Joong-ki, Hyun Young); Red Team (Gary, Haha, Kim Jong-kook, Song Ji-hyo)	Earn the Running Balls	Everyone Wins
32	February 27, 2011 (February 14, 2011)	Kim Kwang-kyu, Tony Ahn	Woongjin Think Big Office (Paju, Gyeonggi Province)	Find the Guests: Mission Team (Kim Kwang-kyu, Tony Ahn); Chasing Team (Yoo Jae-suk, Gary, Haha, Jee Seok-jin, Kim Jong-kook, Lee Kwang-soo, Song Joong-ki, Song Ji-hyo)	Office Olympics: Business Team 1 (Yoo Jae-suk, Song Joong-ki, Song Ji-hyo, Kim Kwang-kyu, Tony Ahn) (Note: Teams were decided by a survey game of who Yoo Jae-suk and Kim Jong-kook wanted on their team.); Business Team 2 (Kim Jong-kook, Gary, Haha, Jee Seok-jin, Lee Kwang-soo)	Earn the Running Balls	Gary, Kim Jong-kook, Lee Kwang-soo, Song Ji-hyo, Kim Kwang-kyu, Tony Ahn Wins; Yoo Jae-suk, Haha, Jee Seok-jin, Song Joong-ki wears red long underwear, and are abandoned in the middle of Seoul Submerged Bridge and must walk to the south end.
33 (Note: Airport Special. (Special Race Mission: Downtown Race - Race throughout Seoul to Incheon International Airport.))	March 6, 2011 (February 21, 2011)	Oh Ji-ho	Incheon International Airport (Jung District, Incheon)	Find the Guests: Mission Team (Oh Ji-ho); Blue Team (Yoo Jae-suk, Jee Seok-jin, Song Joong-ki, Song Ji-hyo) (Note: Teams were decided with whoever that arrived at Sinnonhyeon Station's Entrance 3 and 5.); Red Team (Kim Jong-kook, Gary, Haha, Lee Kwang-soo)	Vacation Olympics: Running Village 1 (Yoo Jae-suk, Jee Seok-jin, Song Joong-ki, Song Ji-hyo, Oh Ji-ho); Running Village 2 (Kim Jong-kook, Gary, Haha, Lee Kwang-soo)	Earn the Running Balls	Running Village 1 Wins (Note: No lottery takes place, only the team who wins the final mission will win and escape punishment regardless of Running Balls from the previous missions.); Running Village 2 wears red long underwear, and are abandoned at Eurwangri Beach and must go to the sea and put on a mud pack.
34 (Note: Special appearance by Nana and Raina (After School) during Challenge 1 vs. 10.)	March 13, 2011 (February 28, 2011)	Park Jun-gyu, Uee (After School)	Hongdae area (Hongdae, Mapo District, Seoul)	Find the Guests: Mission Team (Park Jun-gyu, Uee); Blue Team (Yoo Jae-suk, Haha, Jee Seok-jin, Song Joong-ki); Red Team (Kim Jong-kook, Gary, Lee Kwang-soo, Song Ji-hyo)	The Master of Serving Water: Domestic Team (Yoo Jae-suk, Haha, Jee Seok-jin, Song Joong-ki, Uee); Foreign Team (Kim Jong-kook, Gary, Lee Kwang-soo, Song Ji-hyo, Park Jun-gyu)	Earn the Running Balls	Domestic Team Wins; Foreign Team wears red long underwear and pose as models in a drawing class.
35 (Note: Camping Special - The Lord of Camping.)	March 20, 2011 (March 7, 2011)	Dae-sung (Big Bang), Jung Yong-hwa (CNBLUE)	Nanji Camp (Sangam-dong, Mapo District, Seoul)	Find the Guests: Mission Team (Dae-sung, Jung Yong-hwa); Blue Team (Yoo Jae-suk, Haha, Jee Seok-jin, Song Joong-ki) (Note: Teams were decided by Song Ji-hyo in Mung Ji-hyo's Choice, where she is a team leader and may choose members for her team by picking them up with her water taxi.); Red Team (Song Ji-hyo, Gary, Kim Jong-kook, Lee Kwang-soo)	The Lord of Camping: Platoon 1 (Yoo Jae-suk, Haha, Jee Seok-jin, Song Joong-ki, Dae-sung); Platoon 2 (Kim Jong-kook, Gary, Lee Kwang-soo, Song Ji-hyo, Jung Yong-hwa)	Earn the Running Balls	Platoon 2 Wins; Platoon 1 wears red long underwear, and are abandoned in Gwanghwamun and must run to the statue of King Sejong.
36	March 27, 2011 (March 7, 2011)	Dae-sung (Big Bang), Jung Yong-hwa (CNBLUE)	Nanji Camp (Sangam-dong, Mapo District, Seoul)	Find the Guests: Mission Team (Dae-sung, Jung Yong-hwa); Blue Team (Yoo Jae-suk, Haha, Jee Seok-jin, Song Joong-ki); Red Team (Song Ji-hyo, Gary, Kim Jong-kook, Lee Kwang-soo)	The Lord of Camping: Platoon 1 (Yoo Jae-suk, Haha, Jee Seok-jin, Song Joong-ki, Dae-sung); Platoon 2 (Kim Jong-kook, Gary, Lee Kwang-soo, Song Ji-hyo, Jung Yong-hwa)	Earn the Running Balls	Platoon 2 Wins; Platoon 1 wears red long underwear, and are abandoned in Gwanghwamun and must run to the statue of King Sejong.
37	April 3, 2011 (March 14, 2011)	Park Ye-jin	Metapolis (Hwaseong, Gyeonggi Province)	Find the Guests: Mission Team (Park Ye-jin); Chasing Team (Yoo Jae-suk, Gary, Haha, Jee Seok-jin, Kim Jong-kook, Lee Kwang-soo, Song Joong-ki, Song Ji-hyo)	Grand Opening: Hyuk's People (Yoo Jae-suk, Gary, Jee Seok-jin, Lee Kwang-soo, Park Ye-jin); Kook's People (Kim Jong-kook, Haha, Song Joong-ki, Song Ji-hyo)	Earn the Running Balls	Hyuk's People Wins; Kook's People wears red long underwear, gets abandoned at a highway rest area, and must eat noodles together while looking at each other.
38	April 10, 2011 (March 21, 2011)	No guests	Seoul Medical Center (Jungnang District, Seoul)	Find the Guests: Mission Team (Yoo Jae-suk) (Note: Special Race Mission: The Usual Suspects In Running Man. The members believe they are searching for a guest, but Yoo Jae-suk acts as the guest and must eliminate all the members without them knowing.); Chasing Team (Gary, Haha, Jee Seok-jin, Kim Jong-kook, Lee Kwang-soo, Song Joong-ki, Song Ji-hyo)	Physical Examination: Blue Team (Yoo Jae-suk, Jee Seok-jin, Lee Kwang-soo, Song Ji-hyo); Red Team (Gary, Haha, Kim Jong-kook, Song Joong-ki)	Earn the Running Balls	Yoo Jae-suk, Gary, Haha, Kim Jong-kook, Song Joong-ki Wins; Jee Seok-jin, Lee Kwang-soo, Song Ji-hyo wears red long underwear and must find and wear a pair of slippers on a mountain.
39	April 17, 2011 (April 4, 2011)	Sunny, Yoona (Girls' Generation)	Seoul Folk Flea Market (Dongdaemun District, Seoul)	Catch the Running Man: Mission Team (Yoo Jae-suk, Gary, Haha, Jee Seok-jin, Kim Jong-kook, Lee Kwang-soo, Song Joong-ki, Song Ji-hyo); Chasing Team (Sunny, Yoona)	The Best Late-Night Snack is?: Ji-hyo Team (Song Ji-hyo, Gary, Kim Jong-kook); Sunny Team (Sunny, Jee Seok-jin, Lee Kwang-soo, Song Joong-ki); Yoona Team (Yoona, Yoo Jae-suk, Haha)	Earn the Running Balls	Yoona & Sunny Team Wins; Ji-hyo Team wears red long underwear and must catwalk at a mall in Dongdaemun District.
40	April 24, 2011 (April 11, 2011)	Nichkhun, Taecyeon (2PM)	Petite France (Gapyeong, Gyeonggi-do)	Catch the Running Man: Mission Team (Yoo Jae-suk, Gary, Haha, Jee Seok-jin, Kim Jong-kook, Lee Kwang-soo, Song Joong-ki, Song Ji-hyo); Chasing Team (Nichkhun, Taecyeon)	Running Man Virus: Yu-Maestro Team (Yoo Jae-suk, Haha, Jee Seok-jin, Song Joong-ki, Taecyeon); Kook-Maestro Team (Kim Jong-kook, Gary, Lee Kwang-soo, Song Ji-hyo, Nichkhun)	Earn the Running Balls	Gary, Kim Jong-kook, Lee Kwang-soo, Song Ji-hyo, Nichkhun, Taecyeon Wins; Yoo Jae-suk, Haha, Jee Seok-jin, Song Joong-ki walk along a national road in a row until the musical instrument ends.
41 (Note: Song Joong-ki's last episode as a member.)	May 1, 2011 (April 18, 2011)	Lee Sun-kyun, Park Joong-hoon	National Digital Library of Korea (Seocho District, Seoul)	Joong-hoon Team (Park Joong-hoon, Yoo Jae-suk, Jee Seok-jin, Kim Jong-kook) (Note: Teams were decided by the guests who are to compete to capture more members who would join their team.)	Sun-kyun Team (Lee Sun-kyun, Gary, Haha, Lee Kwang-soo, Song Joong-ki, Song Ji-hyo)	Earn the Running Balls	Joong-hoon Team Wins; Sun-kyun Team must move all of Haha's belongings back to its original place.
42 (Note: Heo Young-saeng only appeared briefly to help deliver one of the missions. Originally, he was the guest but was unable to participate due to his injury.) (Note: Special appearance by Jang Hyuk, Kim Mi-sook, Kim Eung-su.)	May 8, 2011 (April 25, 2011)	No guests	SBS Tanhyeon-dong Production Center (Ilsanseo District, Goyang, Gyeonggi Province)	No teams		Defeat the other members	Gary Wins; Gary "receives" Kim Jong-kook.
43 (Note: Traverse Race - Race from Seoul to Daegu: Special 160 minute episode to fill in the interim of Heroes and Kiss & Cry.)	May 15, 2011 (May 2, 2011)	IU, Shin Bong-sun	Daegu Stadium (Suseong District, Daegu)	Traverse Race/Find the Guests: Mission Team (IU, Shin Bong-sun); Chasing Teams (Yoo Jae-suk & Jee Seok-jin, Gary & Kim Jong-kook, Haha & Song Ji-hyo, Lee Kwang-soo)	Find the 5 Best Foods in Daegu: Jae-suk Team (Yoo Jae-suk, Jee Seok-jin, IU); Haha Team (Haha, Lee Kwang-soo, Song Ji-hyo); Jong-kook Team (Kim Jong-kook, Gary, Shin Bong-sun)	Earn the Running Balls	Jae-suk & Jong-kook Team Wins; Haha Team wears red long underwear and act as an elevator operator for employees at Daegu City Hall.
44 (Note: Special: 48 Hours Race. (The missions continued for two consecutive days.)) (Note: Special appearance by Shin Seung-hwan, who helped Jang Hyuk throughout missions, and Hong Seok-cheon.)	May 22, 2011 (May 9, 2011)	Jang Hyuk	Cheil Worldwide Building (Itaewon, Seoul)	Find the Guests: Mission Team (Jang Hyuk); Chasing Team (Yoo Jae-suk, Gary, Haha, Jee Seok-jin, Kim Jong-kook, Lee Kwang-soo, Song Ji-hyo)	Get-Together Idea Great Match!/Carpool Go To Work Race/Find the Best Commercial Model!: Yu-Pro Team (Yoo Jae-suk, Jee Seok-jin, Song Ji-hyo, Jang Hyuk) (Note: Teams were decided by Jang Hyuk, who won a Running Ball in Find the Guests.); Kim-Pro Team (Kim Jong-kook, Gary, Haha, Lee Kwang-soo)	Earn the Running Balls	Yu-Pro Team Wins; Jong-kook Team must pay for their get-together. Yu-Pro Team's supporters receive a bonus from their boss.
45	May 29, 2011 (May 10, 2011)	Jang Hyuk	Cheil Worldwide Building (Itaewon, Seoul)	Find the Guests: Mission Team (Jang Hyuk); Chasing Team (Yoo Jae-suk, Gary, Haha, Jee Seok-jin, Kim Jong-kook, Lee Kwang-soo, Song Ji-hyo)	Get-Together Idea Great Match!/Carpool Go To Work Race/Find the Best Commercial Model!: Yu-Pro Team (Yoo Jae-suk, Jee Seok-jin, Song Ji-hyo, Jang Hyuk); Kim-Pro Team (Kim Jong-kook, Gary, Haha, Lee Kwang-soo)	Earn the Running Balls	Yu-Pro Team Wins; Jong-kook Team must pay for their get-together. Yu-Pro Team's supporters receive a bonus from their boss.
46	June 5, 2011 (May 23, 2011)	Kim Hyun-joong (SS501)	Kyobo Book Centre (Jongno District, Seoul)	Find the Guests: Mission Team (Kim Hyun-joong, Haha) (Note: Haha was chosen as a spy by Kim Hyun-joong and was to help him throughout the race mission.); Chasing Team (Yoo Jae-suk, Gary, Jee Seok-jin, Kim Jong-kook, Lee Kwang-soo, Song Ji-hyo)	Find the Married Couples in the Office!/Go To Work Check/Survival Race: Jae-suk Team (Yoo Jae-suk, Haha, Jee Seok-jin, Kim Hyun-joong); Jong-kook Team (Kim Jong-kook, Gary, Lee Kwang-soo, Song Ji-hyo)	Earn the Running Balls	Jae-suk Team Wins; Jae-suk Team's supporters receive a bonus from their boss.
47 (Note: Special appearance by Park Beom-shin, Kim Hong-shin, Kim Ok-jung, Jo Hye-ryun, Kang Full, and Jang Yoon-ju.)	June 12, 2011 (May 24, 2011)	Kim Hyun-joong (SS501)	Kyobo Book Centre (Jongno District, Seoul)	Find the Guests: Mission Team (Kim Hyun-joong, Haha); Chasing Team (Yoo Jae-suk, Gary, Jee Seok-jin, Kim Jong-kook, Lee Kwang-soo, Song Ji-hyo)	Find the Married Couples in the Office!/Go To Work Check/Survival Race: Jae-suk Team (Yoo Jae-suk, Haha, Jee Seok-jin, Kim Hyun-joong); Jong-kook Team (Kim Jong-kook, Gary, Lee Kwang-soo, Song Ji-hyo)	Earn the Running Balls	Jae-suk Team Wins; Jae-suk Team's supporters receive a bonus from their boss.
48 (Note: Special Actual Fight Chapter: Find the Royal Treasures.)	June 19, 2011 (June 6, 2011)	No guests	National Museum of Korea (Yongsan District, Seoul)	No teams		Defeat the other members	Song Ji-hyo Wins
49	June 26, 2011 (June 7, 2011)	Goo Ha-ra (Kara), Noh Sa-yeon	Dream Forest (Gangbuk-gu, Seoul)	Queen Ji-hyo Team (Song Ji-hyo, Jee Seok-jin, Lee Kwang-soo); Queen Ha-ra Team (Goo Ha-ra, Haha, Kim Jong-kook); Queen Sa-yeon Team (Noh Sa-yeon, Yoo Jae-suk, Gary) (Note: The male members were to find a "queen bee" and become a team.)		Defeat the other teams	Queen Ha-ra Team Wins
50 (Note: Thailand Special.)	July 3, 2011 (June 19, 2011)	Kim Min-jung, Nichkhun (2PM)	Bangkok (Thailand)	Ji-hyo Team (Song Ji-hyo, Gary, Haha); Min-jung Team (Kim Min-jung, Yoo Jae-suk, Kim Jong-kook); Nichkhun Team (Nichkhun, Jee Seok-jin, Lee Kwang-soo)		Earn more money	Min-jung Team Wins; Min-jung Team keeps the money they earned so far. Ji-hyo & Nichkhun Team's money is confiscated.
51	July 10, 2011 (June 20, 2011)	Kim Min-jung, Nichkhun (2PM)	Pattaya Floating Market (Pattaya, Thailand)	Mission Team (Kim Jong-kook)	Chasing Team (Yoo Jae-suk, Gary, Haha, Jee Seok-jin, Lee Kwang-soo, Song Ji-hyo, Kim Min-jung, Nichkhun)	Find the culprit	Kim Min-jung, Nichkhun Wins; Kim Min-jung, Nichkhun receives all the money earned throughout missions.
52 (Note: 1st Anniversary Special: Running Man Hunter.)	July 17, 2011 (July 4, 2011)	Choi Min-soo, Yoon So-yi	Gyeongju World (Gyeongju, North Gyeongsang Province)	Running Man Team (Yoo Jae-suk, Gary, Haha, Jee Seok-jin, Kim Jong-kook, Lee Kwang-soo, Song Ji-hyo)	Running Man Hunter (Choi Min-soo)	Find the Golden Crowns	Running Man Team Wins
53 (Note: Yoon So-yi only appeared on the second day (episode 53).)	July 24, 2011 (July 5, 2011)	Choi Min-soo, Yoon So-yi	BlueOne Water Park (Bodeok-dong, Gyeongju, North Gyeongsang Province)	Purple Team (Yoo Jae-suk, Gary, Yoon So-yi); Blue Team (Haha, Lee Kwang-soo, Choi Min-soo); Red Team (Jee Seok-jin, Kim Jong-kook, Song Ji-hyo)		Defeat the other teams	Purple Team Wins
54	July 31, 2011 (July 18, 2011)	Choi Kang-hee, Ji Sung	63 Building (Yeouido, Yeongdeungpo District, Seoul)	Gary Team (Gary, Jee Seok-jin, Song Ji-hyo); Kwang-soo Team (Lee Kwang-soo, Yoo Jae-suk, Ji Sung); Kang-hee Team (Choi Kang-hee, Haha, Kim Jong-kook)		Defeat the other teams	Kang-hee Team Wins; Kang-hee Team receives Running Man Golden Rings.
55	August 7, 2011 (August 1, 2011)	Ji-yeon (T-ara), Luna (f(x)), Sulli (f(x)), Suzy (Miss A)	Wootdali Culture Village (Seotan-myeon, Pyeongtaek, Gyeonggi Province)	Partners Race: Yoo Jae-suk & Sulli; Gary (1st game)/ Jee Seok-jin (2nd game) & Song Ji-hyo (Note: Originally, Gary and Song Ji-hyo were partners and Jee Seok-jin was alone. After the first mission, Jee Seok-jin was allowed to switch with a partner and Gary chose the Eliminated card, therefore Jee Seok-jin became Song Ji-hyo's partner and Gary was alone.); Haha & Suzy; Kim Jong-kook & Ji-yeon; Lee Kwang-soo & Luna	Horrific Partners Hide and Seek: Mission Team (Yoo Jae-suk & Sulli, Haha & Suzy, Jee Seok-jin & Song Ji-hyo, Kim Jong-kook & Ji-yeon, Lee Kwang-soo & Luna); Chasing Team (Gary)	Defeat the other teams	Haha & Suzy Wins; Haha & Suzy receives a special couple dinner.
56 (Note: These guests appeared at the end of episode 55 as the guests of that episode "turned into them".)	August 14, 2011 (August 2, 2011)	Ahn Mun-sook, Kim Sook, Shin Bong-sun, Yang Jung-ah	Pyeongtaek Hwangsaewool Village (Pyeongtaek, Gyeonggi Province)	Yoo Jae-suk & Kim Sook; Gary & Song Ji-hyo; Haha & Yang Jung-ah; Kim Jong-kook & Shin Bong-sun; Lee Kwang-soo & Ahn Mun-sook; Jee Seok-jin (Note: Jee Seok-jin became partners with staff member, FD Ko Dong-wan, for a mission.)		Defeat the other teams	Haha & Yang Jung-ah Wins; Haha & Yang Jung-ah receives a special couple dinner and couple rings.
57 (Note: Jeju Island Special.)	August 21, 2011 (August 15, 2011)	Cha Tae-hyun, Shin Se-kyung	International Convention Center Jeju (Seogwipo, Jeju Province)	Pink Team (Yoo Jae-suk, Lee Kwang-soo, Shin Se-kyung); Yellow Team (Gary, Haha, Jee Seok-jin); Blue Team (Kim Jong-kook, Song Ji-hyo, Cha Tae-hyun)		Complete the mission given by the production staff	Pink Team Wins; Pink Team receives a special Jeju Black Pig Barbecue.
58	August 28, 2011 (August 16, 2011)	Cha Tae-hyun, Shin Se-kyung	Seopjikoji (Seogwipo, Jeju Province)	No teams		Defeat the other members	Shin Se-kyung Wins; Shin Se-kyung receives all losing members Running Coin. Yoo Jae-suk who guessed the winner correctly doubled his Running Coin.
59	September 4, 2011 (August 8 & 22, 2011)	Choiza (Dynamic Duo), Gaeko (Dynamic Duo), Simon Dominic (Supreme Team), Tiger JK (Drunken Tiger), Yoon Mi-rae	Old Seoul Station (Yongsan District, Seoul)	Black Team (Yoo Jae-suk, Lee Kwang-soo, Tiger JK, Yoon Mi-rae); Pink Team (Gary, Jee Seok-jin, Song Ji-hyo, Gaeko); Blue Team (Haha, Kim Jong-kook, Choiza, Simon Dominic)	Spy Team (Haha, Song Ji-hyo, Tiger JK) (Note: Haha, Song Ji-hyo and Tiger JK were chosen as spies to sabotage missions from being completed on the first attempt. They would later eliminate all members.)	Defeat the other teams	Spy Team Wins
60 (Note: Chuseok Special.)	September 11, 2011 (August 29, 2011)	No guests	D-Cube City (Sindorim-dong, Guro District, Seoul)	Mission Team (Yoo Jae-suk, Haha, Jee Seok-jin, Kim Jong-kook, Lee Kwang-soo, Song Ji-hyo)	Chasing Team (Gary) (Note: Special Mission: The Tru-Gary Show. Gary believes he is the spy and needs to eliminate all members. However, the members know of this and must allow him to complete his mission and pretend not to know.)	Fool Gary until the end of the recording	Mission Team Wins (Note: The winners may be debatable as the subtitles declared the remaining members as the winner. However, the final scene, a parody of The Usual Suspects, shows that Gary may have known all along, but the show does not declare that as fact. Therefore, the actual winner may be Gary, but it is not confirmed in the broadcast.); The winners receive a deluxe Han-u set.
61 (Note: China Special.) (Note: Song Ji-hyo was unable to attend due to schedule conflicts. Kang Ji-young replaced her, acting as the Running Girl.)	September 18, 2011 (September 4, 2011)	Kang Ji-young (Kara), Kim Joo-hyuk, Lee Yeon-hee	Beijing River (China)	Ji-young Team (Kang Ji-young, Jee Seok-jin, Lee Kwang-soo); Joo-hyuk Team (Kim Joo-hyuk, Haha, Kim Jong-kook); Yeon-hee Team (Lee Yeon-hee, Yoo Jae-suk, Gary)		Earn prize money	Joo-hyuk Team Wins; Joo-hyuk Team receives 8000 RMB. Yeon-hee & Ji-young Team's money is confiscated.
62	September 25, 2011 (September 5, 2011)	Kang Ji-young (Kara), Kim Joo-hyuk, Lee Yeon-hee	China (Huairou) Movie & TV Industry Zone (Beijing, China)	Mission Team (Kim Jong-kook, Song Ji-hyo)	Chasing Team (Yoo Jae-suk, Gary, Haha, Jee Seok-jin, Lee Kwang-soo, Kang Ji-young, Kim Joo-hyuk, Lee Yeon-hee)	Find the culprit	Mission Team Wins; Kim Jong-kook, Song Ji-hyo receives all the prize money from the previous day.
63 (Note: Song Ji-hyo was unable to attend due to health problems.)	October 2, 2011 (September 19, 2011)	Hyo-yeon, Jessica, Seo-hyun, Tae-yeon, Yoona, Yuri (Girls' Generation)	Goyang Stadium (Goyang, Gyeonggi Province)	Green Team (Yoo Jae-suk & Yoona, Lee Kwang-soo & Yuri); Pink Team (Gary & Jessica, Jee Seok-jin & Hyo-yeon); Blue Team (Haha & Tae-yeon, Kim Jong-kook & Seo-hyun)		Complete the mission given by the production staff	Green Team Wins; Lee Kwang-soo and Yuri receive couple rings.
64	October 9, 2011 (September 20, 2011)	Hyo-yeon, Jessica, Seo-hyun, Tae-yeon, Yoona, Yuri (Girls' Generation)	Gyeonggi English Village Paju Camp (Tanhyeon-myeon, Paju, Gyeonggi Province)	Dinner Race: Boys' Generation Team (Yoo Jae-suk, Gary, Jee Seok-jin, Kim Jong-kook, Lee Kwang-soo, Jessica); Girls' Generation Team (Haha, Hyo-yeon, Seo-hyun, Tae-yeon, Yoona, Yuri)	Horrific Couple Hide and Seek: Seekers (Yoo Jae-suk & Seo-hyun) (Note: Couples were decided by the order in which the men and women woke up.); Hiders (Gary & Yoona, Haha & Jessica, Jee Seok-jin & Hyo-yeon, Kim Jong-kook & Tae-yeon, Lee Kwang-soo & Yuri)	Defeat the other teams	Seekers Win; Yoo Jae-suk and Seo-hyun receive a special couple dinner.
65 (Note: Kim Joo-hyuk only appeared on episode 65 and was unable to appear on episode 66 due to schedule conflicts, Song Joong-ki replaced him on episode 66.)	October 23, 2011 (October 3, 2011)	Kim Joo-hyuk, Kim Sun-a	Baekje Military Museum (Bujeok-myeon, Nonsan, South Chungcheong Province)	Mission Team (Kim Sun-ah, Yoo Jae-suk, Haha)	Chasing Team (Gary, Jee Seok-jin, Kim Jong-kook, Lee Kwang-soo, Song Ji-hyo, Kim Joo-hyuk)	Defeat the other teams	Mission Team Wins; Mission Team receives speciality products of Nonsan.
66	October 30, 2011 (October 4, 2011)	Kim Sun-ah, Song Joong-ki	Hangang Park (Yeouido, Yeongdeungpo District, Seoul)	Blue Team (Yoo Jae-suk, Gary, Jee Seok-jin); Red Team (Haha, Kim Jong-kook, Kim Sun-ah); Yellow Team (Lee Kwang-soo, Song Ji-hyo, Song Joong-ki)		Complete the mission given by the production staff	Red Team Wins; Yellow Team must work overtime and greet guests from the Hangang Cruise.
67	November 6, 2011 (October 17, 2011)	Kim Soo-ro, Park Ye-jin	Gungpyeong Village (Seosin-myeon, Hwaseong, Gyeonggi Province)	Red Team (Yoo Jae-suk, Gary, Park Ye-jin); Blue Team (Haha, Kim Jong-kook, Kim Soo-ro); Yellow Team (Jee Seok-jin, Lee Kwang-soo, Song Ji-hyo)		Defeat the other teams	Yellow Team Wins
68	November 13, 2011 (October 18, 2011)	Kim Soo-ro, Park Ye-jin	Canal Walk (Songdo International Business District, Incheon)	Mission Team (Yoo Jae-suk, Gary, Haha, Kim Jong-kook, Song Ji-hyo); Fake Spies (Jee Seok-jin, Lee Kwang-soo)	Spy Team (Kim Soo-ro, Park Ye-jin)	Defeat the other teams	Spy Team Wins
69	November 20, 2011 (October 31, 2011)	Choi Min-soo	Incheon Culture & Arts Center (Guwol-dong, Namdong District, Incheon)	Grasshopper (Yoo Jae-suk); Hostage (Gary, Haha, Jee Seok-jin, Kim Jong-kook, Lee Kwang-soo, Song Ji-hyo)	Grasshopper Hunter (Choi Min-soo)	Yoo Jae-suk must save the members while being hunted by Choi Min-soo and escape the landmark	Choi Min-soo Wins
70	November 27, 2011 (November 14, 2011)	Lee Min-ki, Park Chul-min, Son Ye-jin	KT Building (Bundang District, Seongnam, Gyeonggi Province)	Green Team (Yoo Jae-suk, Son Ye-jin); Blue Team (Gary, Song Ji-hyo, Park Chul-min); Red Team (Haha, Kim Jong-kook, Lee Kwang-soo, Lee Min-ki); Black Team (Jee Seok-jin)	Individual Race; Spy Team (Kim Jong-kook, Son Ye-jin)	Get the nametags of the spies and solve the "FACE" code	Spy Team Wins; Son Ye-jin receives a gold plate.
71	December 4, 2011 (November 15, 2011)	Jo Hye-ryun, Oh Yeon-soo	Gyeonghuigung (Jongno District, Seoul)	Queen Ji-hyo Team (Song Ji-hyo, Jee Seok-jin, Lee Kwang-soo); Queen Hye-ryun Team (Jo Hye-ryun, Haha, Kim Jong-kook); Queen Yeon-soo Team (Oh Yeon-soo, Yoo Jae-suk, Gary)		Earn Running Brass Coins	Queen Yeon-soo Team Wins; Oh Yeon-soo receives a necklace and earrings.
72 (Note: Hong Kong Special - Hong Kong 24 Hours.) (Note: Special appearance by Carrie Lam.) (Note: Special appearance; Missions were given by Jackie Chan via video.)	December 11, 2011 (November 28, 2011)	Jung Yong-hwa (CNBLUE), Lee Min-jung	Hong Kong (China)	Green Team (Yoo Jae-suk, Haha, Lee Min-jung); Yellow Team (Gary, Jee Seok-jin, Lee Kwang-soo); Red Team (Kim Jong-kook, Song Ji-hyo, Jung Yong-hwa)		Solve the Legend of Nine Dragons	Song Ji-hyo Wins; Song Ji-hyo receives a golden cintamani.
73	December 18, 2011 (November 29, 2011)	Jung Yong-hwa (CNBLUE), Lee Min-jung	Ngong Ping Village (Hong Kong, China)	No teams		Solve the Legend of Nine Dragons	Song Ji-hyo Wins; Song Ji-hyo receives a golden cintamani.
74 (Note: Christmas Special.)	December 25, 2011 (December 12, 2011)	No guests	KINTEX (Ilsanseo District, Goyang, Gyeonggi Province)	Yoo Jae-suk (Space Controller); Gary (Duplicator); Haha (Time Controller); Jee Seok-Jin (Phoenix); Kim Jong-kook (Sixth Sense); Lee Kwang-Soo (Death Note); Song Ji-Hyo (Mind Controller)		Defeat the other members	Gary Wins; Gary receives a trip to Europe.

== Ratings ==
Ep. #	Original Airdate	TNmS Ratings		Naver Ratings	
Ep. #	Original Airdate	Nationwide	Seoul Capital Area	Nationwide	Seoul Capital Area
24	January 2, 2011	9.7%	12.9%	11.1%	12.1%
25	January 9, 2011	11.7%	15.7%	10.9%	11.1%
26	January 16, 2011	11.8%	14.4%	11.5%	12.0%
27	January 23, 2011	12.6%	15.8%	13.2%	14.5%
28	January 30, 2011	13.7%	17.5%	14.9%	16.3%
29	February 6, 2011	13.1%	16.6%	15.0%	16.2%
30	February 13, 2011	10.4%	12.5%	10.7%	11.4%
31	February 20, 2011	11.2%	13.7%	12.6%	13.4%
32	February 27, 2011	11.2%	13.7%	12.8%	13.7%
33	March 6, 2011	10.4%	13.1%	11.2%	12.0%
34	March 13, 2011	8.3%	10.7%	10.1%	11.2%
35	March 20, 2011	8.7%	10.4%	9.9%	10.6%
36	March 27, 2011	9.6%	11.7%	11.2%	12.3%
37	April 3, 2011	10.5%	12.9%	11.7%	12.5%
38	April 10, 2011	10.2%	13.4%	11.1%	12.5%
39	April 17, 2011	9.5%	12.6%	10.8%	12.4%
40	April 24, 2011	9.6%	12.4%	10.7%	11.2%
41	May 1, 2011	8.0%	9.7%	9.8%	10.8%
42	May 8, 2011	8.0%	9.9%	7.7%	8.1%
43	May 15, 2011	9.1%	11.9%	9.6%	10.0%
44	May 22, 2011	6.1%	8.0%	6.6%	8.0%
45	May 29, 2011	6.1%	7.6%	6.2%	7.3%
46	June 5, 2011	5.7%	7.2%	7.0%	8.2%
47	June 12, 2011	6.6%	8.9%	8.8%	9.7%
48	June 19, 2011	7.9%	10.3%	7.9%	9.4%
49	June 26, 2011	9.2%	12.0%	10.3%	10.5%
50	July 3, 2011	11.5%	14.2%	13.3%	14.6%
51	July 10, 2011	12.0%	13.9%	12.9%	13.5%
52	July 17, 2011	12.6%	14.5%	13.1%	13.7%
53	July 24, 2011	12.2%	14.2%	13.3%	13.9%
54	July 31, 2011	12.3%	14.2%	13.0%	14.4%
55	August 7, 2011	14.5%	17.4%	14.7%	15.3%
56	August 14, 2011	13.2%	16.8%	13.9%	15.6%
57	August 21, 2011	12.8%	15.1%	13.4%	15.3%
58	August 28, 2011	13.2%	15.0%	14.8%	15.7%
59	September 4, 2011	14.0%	16.0%	14.0%	15.3%
60	September 11, 2011	13.4%	14.8%	13.2%	13.8%
61	September 18, 2011	16.4%	17.8%	16.2%	16.6%
62	September 25, 2011	14.3%	18.5%	14.3%	15.5%
63	October 2, 2011	13.0%	16.0%	13.8%	15.0%
64	October 9, 2011	13.0%	14.2%	13.7%	14.0%
65	October 23, 2011	13.5%	16.8%	14.6%	15.1%
66	October 30, 2011	15.5%	17.5%	14.5%	14.9%
67	November 6, 2011	15.3%	18.3%	15.8%	16.8%
68	November 13, 2011	16.0%	19.4%	15.7%	16.9%
69	November 20, 2011	15.0%	17.1%	16.9%	18.2%
70	November 27, 2011	16.5%	19.8%	18.0%	19.8%
71	December 4, 2011	14.7%	17.6%	16.1%	17.9%
72	December 11, 2011	17.1%	20.4%	17.5%	19.0%
73	December 18, 2011	17.2%	18.9%	19.2%	20.8%
74	December 25, 2011	16.5%	18.7%	17.7%	18.3%
