= Paris Park (Seoul) =

Park in Seoul, South Korea

- 파리공원
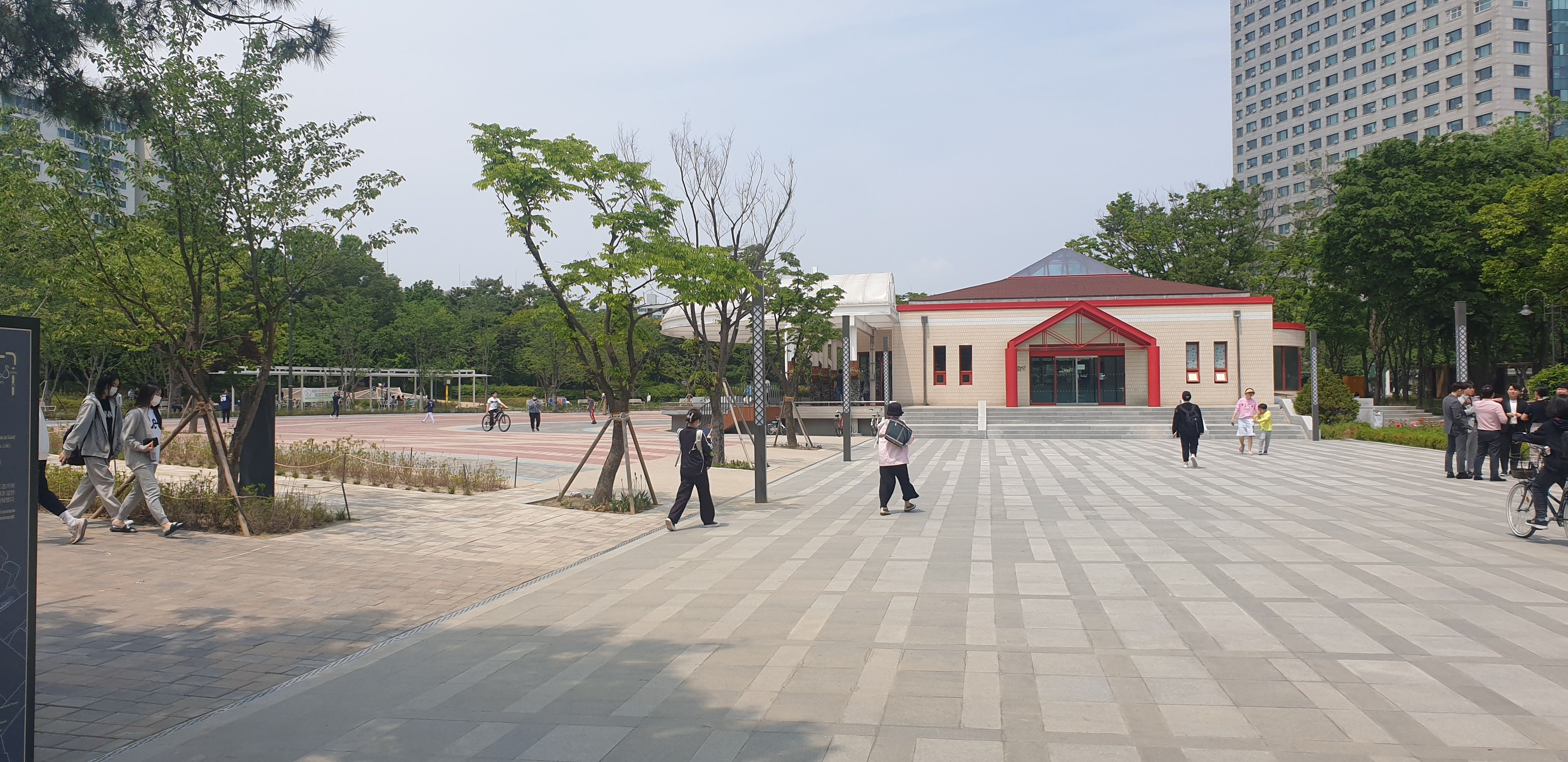
- Interior of the park (2023)
- Location: Mok-dong, Yangcheon District, Seoul, South Korea
- Coordinates: 37.5344°N 126.8771°E
- Area: 2.96 ha (7.3 acres)
- Opened: June 30, 1987
- Etymology: Paris, France
- Website: parks.seoul.go.kr/parks/detailView.do?pIdx=51&tabTarget=1 (in Korean)

Paris Park (Korean: 파리공원) is a park in Mok-dong, Yangcheon District, Seoul, South Korea. It is named for Paris, France, and first opened on June 30, 1987.

== Description ==
The year 1986 marked the centennial of the establishment of French-Korean relations. As part of this, a Place de Séoul public square was established in Paris, France, and a Paris Plaza was established in Seoul. In addition to these establishments, it was decided to rename a park then under construction, originally dubbed Mok-dong 2 Park, to Paris Park.

The park has an area of 2.96 hectares (7.3 acres). It has more Korean cultural elements in the north, and more French cultural elements in the south.

The park has a number of facilities, including a Seoul Plaza, a Paris Plaza, a pond with fountains in it, and a courtyard that blends elements of French and Korean design. Seoul Plaza is decorated with various Korean national symbols, including the flag of South Korea. Paris Plaza is similarly decorated, but with French symbols such as the flag of France and a model of the Eiffel Tower. The park has various outdoor exercise equipment, as well as basketball courts and table tennis tables. When the weather is warm, there are various water fountains and pools for children to play inside of. There are covered sitting areas, with air purifiers, heaters, and air conditioners. Smart benches have spots for charging phones using electricity generated from solar panels, and public Wi-Fi is available. There are also poles with buttons for calling emergency services. The park has space for hosting events, such as weddings and concerts.

The park underwent a significant renovation from August 2020 to April 2022. In December 2023, the renovation won a landscaping award from the city.
