= Heo Jun (television personality) =

South Korean television personality (born 1977)

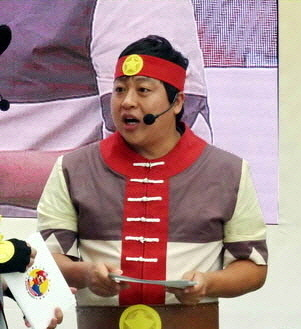
- Born: July 1, 1977 (age 47); South Korea
- Occupation: Television personality

Heo Jun (Korean: 허준; born July 1, 1977) is a South Korean television personality. He hosted TV show Invincible Baseball Team from 2009 to 2010. He is also host TV show Incidentally, Turn to the King since 2010.
