= 2AM discography =

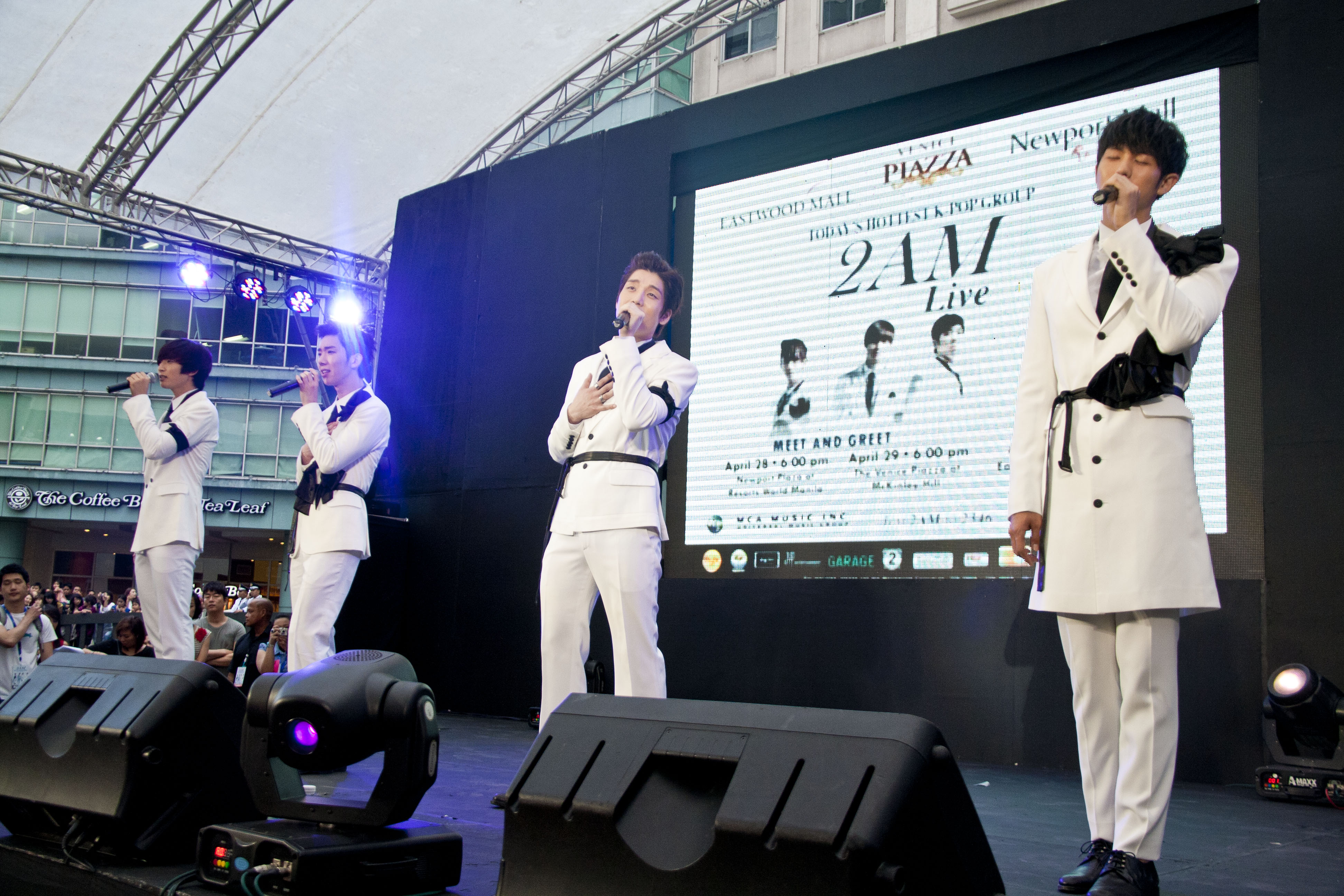
- Studio albums: 4
- Extended plays: 4
- Soundtrack albums: 5
- Singles: 20
- Music videos: 5

South Korean boy group 2AM have released four studio albums, four extended plays, and twenty singles. 2AM debuted with their first single "This Song" in 2008.

== Albums ==
=== Studio albums ===
List of studio albums, with selected details, chart positions and sales
Title	Details	Peak chart positions		Sales
Title	Details	KOR	JPN	Sales
Saint o'Clock	Released: October 26, 2010 (KOR); Label: Big Hit Entertainment; Formats: CD, digital download	2	6	KOR: 54,950; JPN: 11,362
Voice	Released: January 9, 2013 (JPN); Label: Ariola Japan; Formats: CD, digital download	—	10	JPN: 11,664
One Spring Day	Released: March 5, 2013 (KOR); Label: Big Hit Entertainment; Formats: CD, digital download	3	92	KOR: 21,737
Let's Talk	Released: October 30, 2014 (KOR); Label: JYP Entertainment; Formats: CD, digital download	7	—	KOR: 7,835
"—" denotes releases that did not chart or were not released in that region.

=== Reissues ===
List of single albums, with selected details, chart positions and sales
Title	Details	Peak chart positions	Sales
Title	Details	KOR	Sales
I Was Wrong	Released: March 18, 2010; Label: Big Hit Entertainment; Formats: CD, digital download	1	KOR: 47,037

== Extended plays ==
List of extended plays, with selected details, chart positions and sales
Title	Details	Peak chart positions		Sales
Title	Details	KOR	JPN	Sales
Can't Let You Go Even If I Die	Released: January 21, 2010; Label: Big Hit Entertainment; Formats: CD, digital download	2	—	KOR: 58,326
F. Scott Fitzgerald's Way of Love	Released: March 13, 2012; Label: Big Hit Entertainment; Formats: CD, digital download	1	39	KOR: 34,462; JPN: 3,289
Nocturne	Released: November 27, 2013; Label: Big Hit Entertainment; Formats: CD, digital download	4	—	KOR: 8,546
Ballad 21 F/W	Released: November 1, 2021; Label: Culture Depot, Stone Music Entertainment; Formats: CD, digital download	34	—	KOR: 5,530
"—" denotes releases that did not chart or were not released in that region.

== Singles ==
Title	Year	Peak chart positions					Sales (Note: Korean-language singles are based on digital downloads while Japanese-language singles are physical units, except noted.)	Album
Title	Year	KOR	KOR Hot	JPN	JPN Hot	JPN RIAJ	Sales	Album
"This Song" (이노래)	2008	—N/a	—N/a	—	—	—	KOR: 3,967 (phy.)	This Song
"A Friend's Confession" (친구의 고백)	2009	—N/a	—N/a	—	—	—		Time For Confession
"Can't Let You Go Even If I Die" (죽어도 못 보내)	2010	1	—N/a	—	—	—	KOR: 3,352,827	Can't Let You Go Even If I Die
"I Was Wrong" (잘못했어)	2010	2	—N/a	—	—	—	KOR: 2,175,618	I Was Wrong
"You Wouldn't Answer My Calls" (전활 받지 않는 너에게)	2010	1	—N/a	—	—	—	KOR: 1,900,863	Saint o'Clock
"Like Crazy" (미친 듯이)	2010	5	—N/a	—	—	—	KOR: 1,437,852	Saint o'Clock
"Never Let You Go: Shindemo Hanasanai" (Never Let You Go ～死んでも離さない～)	2012	—	—	3	4	81	JPN: 29,973	Voice
"I Wonder If You Hurt Like Me" (너도 나처럼; 君も僕のように)	2012	1	1	—	—	—	KOR: 2,306,398	F.Scott Fitzgerald's Way Of Love and Voice
"Denwa ni Denai Kimi ni" (電話に出ない君に)	2012	—	—	5	19	—	JPN: 20,582	Voice
"One Day" (with 2PM)	2012	—	—	5	5	28	JPN: 66,224	Non-album single
"For You: Kimi no Tame ni Dekiru Koto" (For You ～君のためにできること～)	2012	—	—	6	16	—	JPN: 21,134	Voice
"Darenimo Watasenai Yo" (誰にも渡せないよ)	2012	—	—	7	17	—	JPN: 19,153	Voice
"One Spring Day" (어느 봄날)	2013	3	3	—	—	—	KOR: 943,541	One Spring Day
"Just Stay" (그냥 있어줘)	2013	11	11	—	—	—	KOR: 224,313	Nocturne
"Regret" (후회할거야)	2013	18	18	—	—	—	KOR: 167,499	Nocturne
"Bye Bye"	2014	—	—	—	—	—		2AM Japan Tour 2012 “For You” in Tokyo International Forum
"I Will"	2014	—	—	—	—	—		2AM Japan Tour 2012 “For You” in Tokyo International Forum
"Days Like Today" (오늘따라)	2014	6	—N/a	—	—	—	KOR: 156,646	Let's Talk
"Over the Destiny" (나타나 주라)	2014	20	—N/a	—	—	—	KOR: 186,941	Let's Talk
"Should've Known" (가까이 있어서 몰랐어)	2021	41	34	—	—	—		Ballad 21 F/W
"No Good in Good-Bye" (잘 가라니)	2021	127	—	—	—	—		Ballad 21 F/W
"Though You're Gone" (그대 떠나가도)	2022	—	—	—	—	—		Non-album singles
"If You Change Your Mind" (혹시 니 생각이 바뀌면)	2024	175	—	—	—	—		Non-album singles
"Echoes of Love's Journey" (사랑은 먼 길을 돌아온 메아리 같아서)	2024	197	—	—	—	—		Non-album singles
"—" denotes releases that did not chart or were not released in that region.

== Other charted songs ==
Title	Year	Peak chart positions		Album
Title	Year	KOR	KOR Hot.	Album
"Not Because"	2008	98	—	This Song
"What Should I Do"	2008	107	—	This Song
"Lost"	2009	122	—	Time for Confession
"I'm Sorry I Can't Laugh for You"	2010	4	—	Can't Let You Go Even If I Die
"I Love You"	2010	14	—	Can't Let You Go Even If I Die
"To Her"	2010	20	—	Can't Let You Go Even If I Die
"Laughing"	2010	89	—	Can't Let You Go Even If I Die
"Prologue"	2010	172	—	I Was Wrong
"I'm the One"	2010	59	—	Saint o'Clock
"Mirage"	2010	82	—	Saint o'Clock
"To Love You Again"	2010	30	—	Saint o'Clock
"There Is Nothing More"	2010	41	—	Saint o'Clock
"Nervousness"	2010	68	—	Saint o'Clock
"Love U, Hate U"	2010	86	—	Saint o'Clock
"With or Without U"	2010	91	—	Saint o'Clock
"Can't Say I Love You"	2010	55	—	Saint o'Clock
"You Were Mine"	2012	4	10	F.Scott Fitzgerald's Way Of Love
"Erase All Our Memories"	2012	14	35	F.Scott Fitzgerald's Way Of Love
"One More Second"	2012	13	30	F.Scott Fitzgerald's Way Of Love
"To Leave On Good Terms"	2012	9	24	F.Scott Fitzgerald's Way Of Love
"I Love You, I Love You"	2012	15	27	F.Scott Fitzgerald's Way Of Love
"Spring"	2013	102	—	One Spring Day
"Reading You"	2013	28	38	One Spring Day
"Consolation"	2013	51	63	One Spring Day
"Sunshine"	2013	70	97	One Spring Day
"Back Then"	2013	58	67	One Spring Day
"Forgetting You"	2013	57	76	One Spring Day
"Coming To Me"	2013	75	—	One Spring Day
"You’re Prettier The More I See You"	2013	104	—	Nocturne
"To An Angel"	2013	133	—	Nocturne
"Only You"	2013	132	—	Nocturne
"—" denotes releases that did not chart or were not released in that region.

== Collaborations ==
Title	Year	Members	Other artist(s)	Album
"Molla-ing" (몰라-ing)	2009	Jo Kwon and Jinwoon	May Doni	7 Teen
"Star"	2010	Changmin and Jinwoon	8eight	The Bridge
"No. 1"	2010	All	—N/a	Listen Up! The Official 2010 FIFA World Cup Album
"For You, Goodbye" (널 위한 이별)	2010	All	—N/a	20th Anniversary Shin Seung Hun (Best Collection & Tribute Album)
"最愛/Saiai (The Best Love)"	2011	All	—N/a	"The Best Bang!! With Special Guests -Fukuyama Masaharu Remake"

== Soundtrack appearances ==
Title	Year	Members	Album
"Like a Fool"	2010	All	Personal Taste OST
"Love"	2010	All	Acoustic OST
"Can't I Love You" (사랑하면 안될까)	2011	Changmin and Jinwoon	Dream High OST
"Road of Tears" (눈물길)	2012	Changmin and Seulong	Dr. Jin OST
"Saying I Love You" (사랑한단 말)	2014	Changmin and Jinwoon	Hotel King OST
"1second 1minute 1hour" (1초 1분 1시간)	2022	All	Something Between Us OST

== Videography ==
=== Video albums ===
Title	Details	Peak chart positions
Title	Details	JPN
2AM Japan Tour 2012 “For You” in Tokyo International Forum	Released: August 20, 2014; Label: Epic Records Japan; Format: DVD	32
