= BigHit Music discography =

The Big Hit Music discography consists of most of the records distributed under the label since 2005.

== 2000s ==
=== 2005-2008 ===
Released	Title	Artist	Format	Language
June 10, 2005	Music Is My Life	Lim Jeong-hee	Full album, Digital download	Korean
2005	"Belief" (The Rain OST)	Lim Jeong-hee	Digital download	Korean
March 24, 2006	Thanks	Lim Jeong-hee	Full album, Digital download	Korean
March 6, 2007	Left Heart (왼쪽가슴)	K.Will	Full album, Digital download	Korean
September 3, 2007	The First	8Eight	Full album, Digital download	Korean
October 4, 2007	Before I Go J-Lim	Lim Jeong-hee	Full album, Digital download	Korean
December 2007	Heaven Breeze (하늘아 바람아)	Lim Jeong-hee	Digital download	Korean
March 18, 2008	Infinity	8Eight	Full album, Digital download	Korean
July 21, 2008	"This Song"	2AM	Digital download	Korean
November 11, 2008	"Dala Song"	8eight with Park Ki-young & Horan	Digital download	Korean
November 13, 2008	"All Night"	Baek Ji-young ft. Jo Kwon (2AM)	Digital download	Korean
December 12, 2008	"Superman"	Mario ft. Changmin (2AM)	Digital download	Korean

=== 2009 ===
Released	Title	Artist	Format	Language
January 5	"Molla-ing"	May Doni ft. Jo Kwon & Jinwoon (2AM)	Digital download	Korean
February 9	"Graduation"	Changmin & Jo Kwon (2AM)	Digital download	Korean
March 3	Golden Age	8Eight	Full album, Digital download	Korean
March 23	Time for Confession	2AM	Single album, Digital download	Korean
September 8	30 Minutes Ago	Lee Hyun (8Eight)	EP, Digital download	Korean
September 29	"Dunk Shot"	Jo Kwon (2AM) & Whale	Digital download	Korean
December 1	"Don't Swallow" (Dream Comes True OST)	Changmin (2AM)	Digital download	Korean
December 17	"We Fell in Love"	Jo Kwon (2AM) & Gain (Brown Eyed Girls)	Digital download	Korean

== 2010s ==
=== 2010 ===
Released	Title	Artist	Format	Language
January 21	Can't Let You Go Even If I Die	2AM	EP, Digital download	Korean
March 16	"I Was Wrong"	2AM	Digital download	Korean
March 23	"Farewell Story"	Wax ft. Jo Kwon (2AM)	Digital download	Korean
March 30	The Bridge	8Eight	EP, Digital download	Korean
March 31	"Like A Fool" (Personal Taste OST)	2AM	Digital download	Korean
June 3	"Nagging"	Seulong (2AM) & IU	Digital download	Korean
August 16	"Still Eating Well"	Lee Hyun (8Eight) & Changmin (2AM)	Digital download	Korean
September 30	It Can't be Real	Lim Jeong-hee	EP, Digital download	Korean
October 15	"Let's Go"	G20 musical guests (with Changmin of 2AM)	Digital download	Korean
October 25	"You Wouldn't Answer My Calls"	2AM	Digital download	Korean
October 26	Saint o'Clock	2AM	Full album, Digital download	Korean

=== 2011 ===
Released	Title	Artist	Format	Language
January 3	"Can't I Love You" (Dream High OST)	Changmin & Jinwoon (2AM)	Digital download	Korean
January 3	"Don't Go" (Dream High OST)	Lim Jeong-hee & Jun. K (2PM)	Digital download	Korean
April 26	"Please Don't Go"	San E ft. Outsider & Changmin (2AM)	Digital download	Korean
July 18	8eight	8Eight	EP, Digital download	Korean
July 18	Man Should Laugh	Lee Hyun	EP, Digital download	Korean
August 7	"You Walking Towards Me"	Jinwoon (2AM)	Digital download	Korean
November 16	"Now or Never"	Jinwoon (2AM)	Digital download	Korean
November 23	"How We Feel"	Seulong (2AM) & DJ Clazzi	Digital download	Korean

=== 2012 ===
Released	Title	Artist	Format	Language
January 4	The Healing Echo	Lee Hyun	Full album, Digital download	Korean
January 11	Never Let You Go	2AM	Single album, Digital download	Japanese
March 12	F.Scott Fitzgerald's Way Of Love	2AM	EP, Digital download	Korean
April 11	Denwa ni Denai Kimi ni	2AM	Single album, Digital download	Japanese
May 9	Golden Lady	Lim Jeong-hee	EP, Digital download	Korean
June 25	I'm Da One	Jo Kwon (2AM)	Full album, Digital download	Korean
July 1	"I Can't Live Without You" (You Are the Best! OST)	Dahee (GLAM) & Changmin (2AM)	Digital download	Korean
July 4	One Day	2AM with 2PM	Single album, Digital download	Japanese
July 9	"Party (XXO)"	GLAM	Digital download	Korean
September 12	For You	2AM	Single album, Digital download	Japanese
October 26	"The Person I Miss" (Five Fingers OST)	GLAM	Digital download	Korean
October 26	"Words There's No Way You Can Hear" (Five Fingers OST)	Homme	Digital download	Korean
October 26	"Because I'm Sorry" (Five Fingers OST)	Homme	Digital download	Korean
December 5	Darenimo Watasenai Yo	2AM	Single album, Digital download	Japanese
December 26	"Yesterday"	Dynamic Black (with Jinwoon of 2AM)	Digital download	Korean
December 26	"Tearfully Beautiful"	Dramatic Blue (with Jo Kwon of 2AM)	Digital download	Korean

=== 2013 ===
Released	Title	Artist	Format	Language
January 1	"I Like That"	GLAM	Digital download	Korean
January 9	Voice	2AM	Full album, Digital download	Japanese
March 5	One Spring Day	2AM	Full album, Digital download	Korean
March 12	"In Front of the Mirror"	GLAM	Digital download	Korean
March 15	"Words I Couldn't Say"	Jinwoon (2AM) & Star Love Fish	Digital download	Korean
March 17	"I Only See One Person" (You Are the Best! OST)	Dahee (GLAM) & Changmin (2AM)	Digital download	Korean
May 6	"Levels"	Seulong (2AM) & Avicii	Digital download	Korean
August 8	"Luv Is"	Lim Jeong-hee	Digital download	Korean
September 17	"Summer, Night"	Seulong (2AM) & Epitone Project	Digital download	Korean
October 9	"Moment" (The Heirs OST)	Changmin (2AM)	Digital download	Korean
November 19	"Just Stay"	2AM	Digital download	Korean
November 27	Nocturne	2AM	EP, Digital download	Korean

=== 2014 ===
Released	Title	Artist	Format	Language
February 4	"Give It 2 U"	GLAM	Digital download	Korean
February 6	"Q&A"	Gain (Brown Eyed Girls) ft. Jo Kwon (2AM)	Digital download	Korean
April 18	"Scent of A Flower" (Emergency Couple OST)	Lim Jeong-hee	Digital download	Korean
April 25	"Saying I Love You" (Hotel King OST)	Changmin & Jinwoon (2AM)	Digital download	Korean
April 25	"Hope" (Jang Bo-ri is Here! OST)	Changmin (2AM)	Digital download	Korean
May 22	"The Very Last First"	Melody Day ft. Changmin	Digital download	Korean
May 22	"New You"	Yoon Jong-shin ft. Seulong (2AM)	Digital download	Korean
March 20	Pour Les Femme	Homme	EP, Digital download	Korean
August 4	"Pool Party"	Swings ft. Seulong (2AM), G.NA, & Yoon Jongshin	Digital download	Korean
September 9	"U Don't Know"	Seulong (2AM) & Taecyeon (2PM)	Digital download	Korean
September 9	"Suddenly"	Jo Kwon (2AM), Baek Ye-rin (15&), and Jun. K (2PM)	Digital download	Korean
September 23	"Love Comes With Goodbyes" (Endless Love OST)	Homme	Digital download	Korean
October 30	Let's Talk	2AM	Full album, Digital download	Korean

=== 2015 ===
Released	Title	Artist	Format	Language
February 1	"It's Cold"	Shim Hyun Bo & Seulong (2AM)	Digital download	Korean
February 27	"Good Start 2015"	Seulong (2AM) & Jimin (AOA)	Digital download	Korean
March 20	"Mirage" (Super Daddy Yeol OST)	Changmin (2AM)	Digital download	Korean
September 2	"3 SEC"	Homme & Kisum	Digital download	Korean
October 2	"No More Cry"	Homme	Digital download	Korean
November 3	"It's Not Love"	Homme	Digital download	Korean

=== 2016 ===
Released	Title	Artist	Format	Language
April 1	"Just Come to Me"	Homme	Digital download	Korean
December 21	"All of Me"	Homme	Digital download	Korean

=== 2017 ===
Released	Title	Artist	Format	Language
December 1	"Your Lips"	Lee Hyun	Digital download	Korean

=== 2018 ===
Released	Title	Artist	Format	Language
February 26	"Will There Be a Next Time"	Lee Hyun	Digital download	Korean

=== 2019 ===
Released	Title	Artist	Format	Language
March 4	The Dream Chapter: Star	TXT	EP, Digital download	Korean
May 3	"Cat & Dog" (English version)	TXT	Digital download	English
May 31	"Our Summer" (Acoustic Mix)	TXT	Digital download	Korean
October 21	The Dream Chapter: Magic	TXT	Full album, Digital download	Korean

== 2020s ==
=== 2020 ===
Released	Title	Artist	Format	Language
January 15	Magic Hour	TXT	Single album, Digital download	Japanese
February 7	"Fool Again"	8Eight	Digital download	Korean
August 19	Drama	TXT	Single album, Digital download	Japanese
October 26	Minisode1: Blue Hour	TXT	EP, Digital download	Korean
November 24	"Your Light" (Live On OST Pt.1)	TXT	Digital download	Korean

=== 2021 ===
Released	Title	Artist	Format	Language
January 20	Still Dreaming	TXT	Full album, Digital download	Japanese
May 31	The Chaos Chapter: Freeze	TXT	Full album, Digital download	Korean
June 25	"0x1=Lovesong (I Know I Love You)" (feat. pH-1, Woodie Gochild, Seori)	TXT	Digital download	Korean
August 17	The Chaos Chapter: Fight or Escape	TXT	Repackage album, Digital download	Korean
September 10	"0x1=Lovesong (I Know I Love You)" (feat. Mod Sun)	TXT	Digital download	Korean
November 10	Chaotic Wonderland	TXT	EP, Digital download	Japanese

=== 2022 ===
Released	Title	Artist	Format	Language
May 9	Minisode 2: Thursday's Child	TXT	EP, Digital download	Korean
July 22	"Valley of Lies"	TXT	Digital single, Digital download	Korean
August 31	Good Boy Gone Bad	TXT	Single album, Digital download	Japanese

=== 2023 ===
Released	Title	Artist	Format	Language
January 27	The Name Chapter: Temptation	TXT	CD, digital download, streaming	Korean
July 5	Sweet	TXT	CD, DVD, digital download, streaming	Japanese
July 7	"Do It Like That"	TXT (with Jonas Brothers)	Digital download, streaming	English
September 15	"Back for More"	TXT (with Anitta)	Digital download, streaming	English, Spanish
October 13	The Name Chapter: Freefall	TXT	CD, digital download, streaming	Korean

=== 2024 ===
Released	Title	Artist	Format	Language
April 1	Minisode 3: Tomorrow	TXT	CD, digital download, streaming	Korean
November 4	The Star Chapter: Sanctuary	TXT	CD, digital download, streaming	English, Korean
