= One Day (South Korean band) =

South Korean boy band

- Origin: Seoul, South Korea
- Genre: K-pop
- Years active: Undebuted
- Label: JYP
- Spinoffs: 2PM; 2AM; JYP Nation
- Past members: Changmin; Jaebeom; Seulong; Jun. K; Nichkhun; Taecyeon; Wooyoung; Jo Kwon; Junho; Chansung; Jinwoon

One Day (Korean: 원데이) was an eleven-member South Korean band formed by Korean musician Park Jin-young of JYP Entertainment. After performing as one group, it was splintered into two separate bands, the ballad-oriented group 2AM and the dance-focused group 2PM. Since their debut, 2AM and 2PM members have frequently appeared together on YouTube videos and television programs, collaborated on songs, and performed together.

== Formation ==
A reality TV series on Mnet called Hot Blood Men captured the group's rigorous training program and had viewers vote on which trainees would debut. Former member Jay Park (Jaebeom) received the most fan votes, finishing in the top spot, while three trainees were eliminated: Lee Swichi, Jeong Jin-woon, and Yoon Doo-joon who were all cut. However, Jinwoon replaced Im Daehun upon the latter's withdrawal. By the end of the training process, One Day had been reduced to an eleven-member group.

== Split ==
The band was then split into four-member ballad group 2AM and seven-member hip-hop group 2PM.

2AM (Korean: 투에이엠; RR: Tueiem), became a four-member boy band and ballad group consisting of:

- Jo Kwon
- Lee Chang-min
- Lim Seul-ong
- Jeong Jin-woon

2PM (Korean: 투피엠; RR: Tupiem), became a seven-member hip hop band formed by JYP Entertainment, consisting of:

- Jun. K (formerly known as Kim Junsu)
- Nichkhun Buck Horvejkul
- Ok Taec-yeon
- Jang Wooyoung
- Lee Jun-ho
- Hwang Chan-sung
- Jay Park (also known as Park Jaebeom; left 2PM in September 2009).

== Collaborative work ==
As labelmates, 2AM and 2PM members have frequently appeared together on YouTube videos and variety TV programs such as Win Win, Star King, Star Golden Bell, and Strong Heart, collaborated on songs, and performed together at JYP Nation concerts.

In 2009, as part of a project for 2PM's variety show Wild Bunny, 2AM members Jo Kwon and Lim Seul-ong joined Ok Taec-yeon, Jang Wooyoung, and Hwang Chan-sung in filming a parody music video of Brown Eyed Girls' song "Abracadabra" under the group name of Dirty Eyed Girls. In 2010, Jo Kwon and Ok Taec-yeon were cast together for the second season of SBS's popular variety show Family Outing, and Jo Kwon and Nichkhun were both cast members of the second season of MBC's variety show We Got Married, where they occasionally appeared in episodes together. Also in 2010, 2AM also made a guest appearance at 2PM's first concert titled Don't Stop Can't Stop, and Hwang Chan-sung collaborated with 2AM on the song "To Her" (그녀에게) from 2AM's first EP Can't Let You Go Even If I Die. At the end of the year, 2PM and 2AM were among the JYP Nation artists who worked on the single "This Christmas", released prior to JYP Nation's 2010 concert. In 2011, 2AM members Jo Kwon and Lim Seul-ong made a guest appearance on the August 20 episode of 2PM's variety show 2PM Show!

From April 3, 2012 to September 25, 2012, 2AM and 2PM hosted a Japanese television show on Tokyo MX titled Wander Trip, in which members of both groups traveled through Japan and experienced Japanese culture. Also in April 2012, a Japanese documentary film featuring 2AM and 2PM titled Beyond the One Day ~Story of 2PM and 2AM~ was announced. The trailer for the film was released on April 13, with the film itself premiering on June 30. The theme song of the documentary, "One Day", was released as a digital single on July 4 as a collaboration between 2AM and 2PM, peaking at number five on the Oricon Singles Chart. The B-side track "No Goodbyes" was included in the single, and a live version of 2PM's song "Angel" from their debut single Hottest Time of the Day was included as a CD-only bonus track.

In 2014, Ok Taec-yeon and Lim Seul-ong collaborated on the song "U Don't Know", which they composed and wrote together. The song released as part of the live album JYP Nation Korea 2014 'One Mic' and, along with other collaborative stages between One Day members, was performed during the 2014 JYP Nation concert in South Korea. Also included in the live album were a live recording and a studio recording of a Korean rendition of the song "No Goodbyes", originally a Japanese B-side track for One Day. 2AM would then go on hiatus in 2015 as their members began leaving JYP Entertainment, followed by 2PM's hiatus starting in 2017 as their members began their mandatory military service.

Despite the members of One Day no longer belonging to the same label, members would continue to make television appearances together. For example, on January 24, 2018, Jo Kwon and Jang Wooyoung appeared together on MBC's Radio Star, and on March 14, 2019, Hwang Chan-sung and Jeong Jin-woon appeared together on Channel A's fishing show The Fisherman and the City. On April 4, 2020, Jo Kwon and Jang Wooyoung made a guest appearance together on JTBC's variety program Knowing Bros, the first variety TV show appearance for both since being discharged from the military.

In 2021, 2AM and 2PM both ended their hiatuses with the release of comeback albums. Lee Jun-ho starred in two music videos for 2AM's songs, "Should've Known" (가까이 있어서 몰랐어; Gakkai Isseoseo Mollasseo) and "No Good in Good-Bye" (잘 가라니; Jal Garani) from their comeback EP Ballad 21 F/W. Also in 2021, Jo Kwon reunited with former 2PM member Jay Park during the October 12 episode of Mnet's dance competition TV show Street Woman Fighter, which was the first time the two were seen interacting since Park's departure from 2PM in 2009.

In 2024, Hwang Chan-sung and Lee Chang-min, both of whom are signed to the agency HIAN Inc. for their activities in Japan, collaborated with Japanese hip-hop artist AK-69 on the Japanese single "Into the Fire", which was also used as the theme song for the anime television series adaptation of Re:Monster. In 2025, Lee Jun-ho appeared on Lim Seul-ong's newly-launched YouTube channel, OngStyle, in his first YouTube video.

== Discography ==
Title	Year	Artist	Peak chart positions		Album
Title	Year	Artist	KOR	JPN	Album
Korean
"To Her" (그녀에게)	2010	2AM feat. Hwang Chan-sung	20	—	Can't Let You Go Even If I Die
"This Christmas"	2010	JYP Nation (2AM, 2PM, Miss A, Wonder Girls, J.Y. Park, San E, Joo, Lim Jeong-hee)	34	—	Non-album single
"Angel" (JYP Nation in Japan 2011 ver.) (Note: Live version from JYP Nation in Japan 2011)	2012	2AM & 2PM (One Day)	—	—	One Day
"No Goodbyes" (Korean ver.) (Note: Live version from JYP Nation Korea 2014 'One Mic')	2014	2AM & 2PM (One Day)	—	—	JYP Nation Korea 2014 'One Mic'
"No Goodbyes" (Korean original ver.)	2014	2AM & 2PM (One Day)	—	—	JYP Nation Korea 2014 'One Mic'
"U Don't Know"	2014	Lim Seul-ong & Ok Taec-yeon	—	—	JYP Nation Korea 2014 'One Mic'
Japanese
"One Day"	2012	2AM & 2PM (One Day)	—	5	One Day
"No Goodbyes"	2012	2AM & 2PM (One Day)	—	5	One Day
"Into the Fire"	2024	Hwang Chan-sung & AK-69 feat. Lee Chang-min	—	18	Dawn
