= Like Crazy (disambiguation) =

Like Crazy is a 2011 American film.

Like Crazy may also refer to:

- Like Crazy (2016 film), Italian film
- Like Crazy, a 2013 album by Rose Falcon
- "Like Crazy", song and single by Korean band 2AM from the album Saint o'Clock (2010)
- "Like Crazy" (song), song and single by Jimin of BTS from the album Face (2023)

See also:
