= Hwang Chan-sung =

South Korean singer and actor (born 1990)

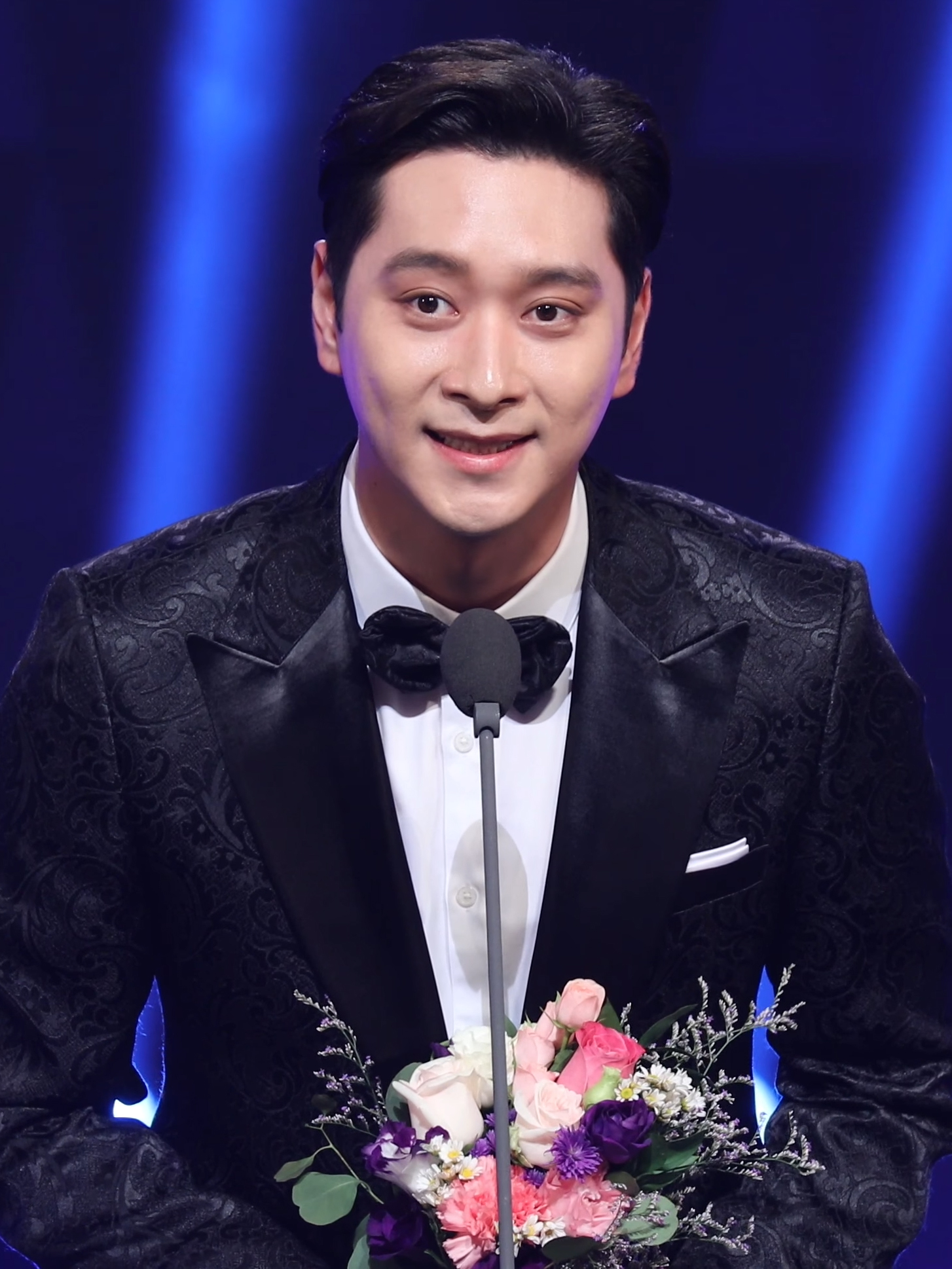
- Hwang at the 11th Korea Drama Awards, 2018
- Born: February 11, 1990 (age 36); Seoul, South Korea
- Other name: Chansung
- Education: Howon University (BA); Sejong University (MA)
- Occupations: Singer-songwriter; rapper; actor
- Agent(s): L' July Entertainment (South Korea); HIAN Inc. (Japan)
- Spouse: Unknown (m. 2022)
- Children: 1
- Musical career
- Genres: K-pop; J-pop
- Instruments: Vocals
- Years active: 2006–present
- Labels: HIAN Inc.; JYP
- Member of: 2PM
- Formerly of: JYP Nation; One Day
- Website: hwangchansung.bstage.in chansung.jp

Korean name
- Hangul: 황찬성
- Hanja: 黃燦盛
- RR: Hwang Chanseong
- MR: Hwang Ch'ansŏng

Signature
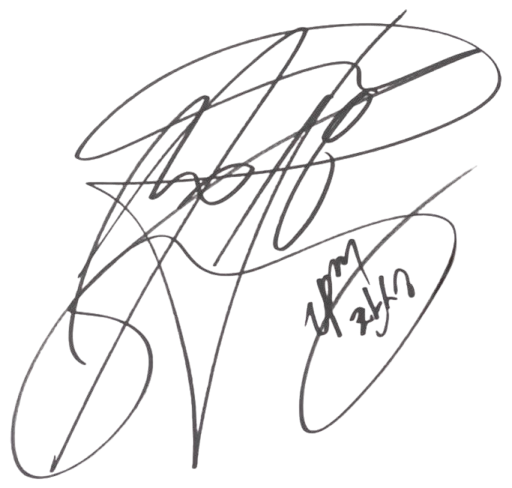

Hwang Chan-sung (Korean: 황찬성, born February 11, 1990), also known mononymously as Chansung, is a South Korean singer-songwriter, rapper and actor. He is a member of the Korean boy band 2PM. He made his debut as an actor in the 2006 comedy series Unstoppable High Kick, and has since starred in television series such as What's Wrong with Secretary Kim (2018), So I Married the Anti-fan (2021), Show Window: The Queen's House (2021–2022), True to Love (2023), and Bloodhounds (2026). As a solo artist, Hwang has released one studio album and one extended play in Japan.

== Early life and education ==
Hwang was born and raised in Seoul, South Korea. As a child, he had no interest in the performing arts and trained in taekwondo and kumdo with the ambition of becoming a taekwondo instructor. On the sports variety program Our Neighborhood Arts and Physical Education, he revealed that he holds a third degree black belt in taekwondo.

Upon joining JYP Entertainment, he transferred to Korean Arts High School, where he graduated in 2008 alongside Raina of After School and fellow JYP Entertainment trainees Sunye and Jo Kwon.

Hwang participated in an undergraduate program at Howon University located in Gunsan, South Korea, with his bandmates Junho and Wooyoung. Furthermore, along with Junho, he attained a master's degree of cinematography at Sejong University.

== Career ==
=== Pre-debut ===
Hwang was a television actor, having played roles in MBC's 2006 comedy sitcom Unstoppable High Kick, and then in KBS2's 2008 teen drama Jungle Fish. The latter won a number of awards, including the Peabody Award.

In 2006, Hwang was among the dozen finalists to compete in JYP Entertainment's audition program Superstar Survival, where he would meet future bandmates Junho and Taecyeon. He was offered a trainee contract despite being eliminated.

=== Music career ===
In 2008, he participated in Mnet's Hot Blooded Men, a program that chronicles the rigorous training of thirteen aspiring trainees, all vying for a coveted spot in the boy band One Day. This initiative ultimately led to the formation of two distinct boy bands, namely 2AM and 2PM.

Half a year following the televised airing of Hot Blooded Men, the group 2PM made their debut with the release of their inaugural single "10 Out of 10" from their first single album titled Hottest Time of the Day. However, it was their second single album, 2:00PM Time For Change, that propelled them to mainstream success in Korean music, solidifying their meteoric rise. As of 2021, the group has released seven studio albums in Korea and five studio albums in Japan. Hwang has written and composed several songs for the group.

On May 23, 2018, Hwang made his solo debut as a singer with his first Japanese EP titled Complex. That same month, Hwang began his first solo concert tour, Complex, with shows in Osaka and Tokyo. Later that year, Hwang held his first solo fan meetings in Osaka, Tokyo, and Seoul. He held two more fan meetings in South Korea titled Too Much Chanformation on June 1, 2019.

In 2023, Hwang held a series of fan meetings titled CSBS in Osaka and Tokyo. In 2024, he held a series of fan meetings titled Chanie's Bear Museum in Tokyo and Seoul.

On April 24, 2024, almost six years after Complex, Hwang collaborated with 2AM's Lee Chang-min and Japanese hip-hop artist AK-69 on the Japanese single "Into the Fire", which was also used as the theme song for the anime television series adaptation of Re:Monster. On December 4, 2024, Hwang released another Japanese single titled Korekara No Kimi No Tameni (これからの君のために; For You, In the Future). The album featured a track of the same name, which was used as the theme song for a Japanese drama Hwang starred in, Jun Kissa Inyeon, as well as the track "My Everything".

On August 26, 2025, Hwang released his first Chinese single, "Withdrawal Symptoms of Longing" (思念戒断反应), exclusively on Douyin's music app Soda Music, before being released on other music platforms on August 30. On October 29, 2025, Hwang released his first Japanese studio album titled Dawn, which included his Japanese singles from 2024 and a title track featuring his bandmate Jun. K titled "Amaku Setsunaku Tsuyoku" (甘く 切なく 強く; Sweet, Sad, Strong), which was pre-released digitally on October 24. In conjunction with his first studio album, he held a series of solo concerts in Japan titled Dawn ~The First Step~ from November 2–5 and on December 11.

=== Acting career ===
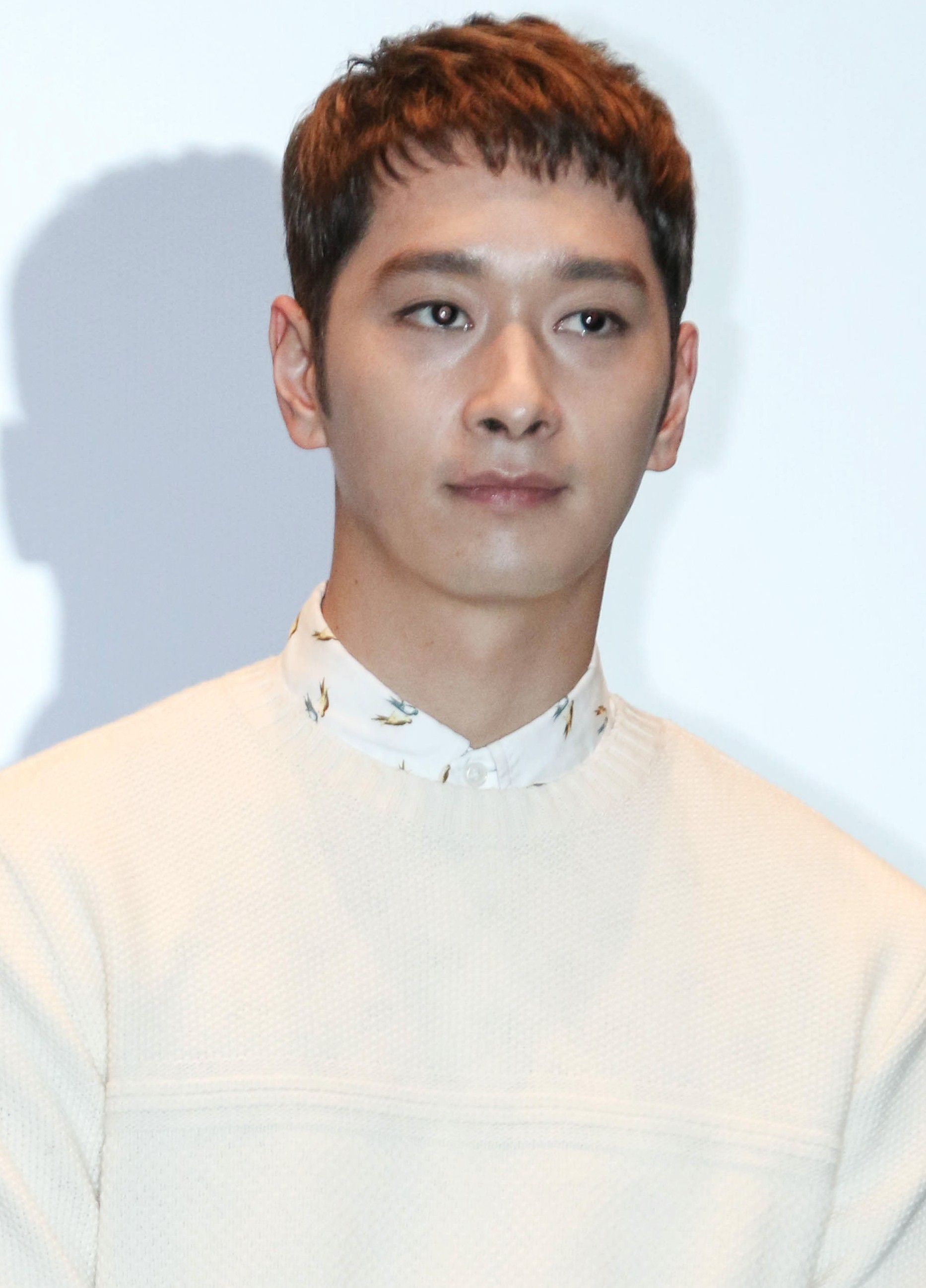
Hwang at the press conference for Red Carpet, 2014

In 2011, Hwang continued his acting career with the role of Jack in the Japanese drama Kaitō Royale.

In 2013, he played the supporting role of Gong Do-ha in a spy romantic comedy series, 7th Grade Civil Servant. The same year, Hwang took on the role of newbie gangster Hyeong-ju in Votre Noir.

In 2015, he made his acting debut in a Japanese film, The Last Snow of Winter, writing the lyrics for and singing the main theme song, "Yakusoku" (約束).

In 2016, Hwang was cast in the romantic-comedy drama My Horrible Boss as Nam Bong-gi.

In 2017, he was cast for a special cameo appearance as Eun Bong Hee's (Nam Ji Hyun) ex-boyfriend in SBS drama Suspicious Partner, and he appeared in KBS2's drama Queen for Seven Days as Seo No, the bodyguard and friend of Lee Yeok (Yeon Woo Jin). The same year, he made his official debut as a stage actor for the play My Love, My Bride and the musical Altar Boyz in Japan and South Korea, in which Hwang played the role of the band's leader Matthew.

In 2018, Hwang starred in the tvN drama What's Wrong with Secretary Kim and was awarded the Hallyu Star Award and Male Excellence Award at the 11th Korea Drama Awards for his work. He then starred in the first and second episodes of a promotional web series produced for Lotte Duty Free, Secret Queen Makers. In addition, he made his musical debut in Korea with the role of Hae in Smoke.

On February 7, 2020, Hwang starred in the Netflix series My Holo Love.

On April 30, 2021, Hwang's drama So I Married the Anti-fan premiered on Naver TV, with simultaneous broadcast through V Live and global platforms iQIYI, Viki and Amazon Prime Video in Japan. The drama was originally filmed in 2018 and was based on the 2010 novel So I Married The Anti-Fan, which was also adapted into a webtoon and a Chinese film.

Also in 2021, Hwang and his bandmate Nichkhun made special cameo appearances in Vincenzo to support their bandmate Taecyeon, who played a main role in the series. In November of that year, Hwang's drama Show Window: The Queen's House began airing. The drama went on to become one of the highest-rated dramas in Korean cable television history, and its finale set a new record for the highest viewership ratings of any Channel A series.

In 2023, Hwang played the role of Noh Joo-wan in the drama True to Love. In 2024, Hwang starred in the Japanese drama Jun Kissa Inyeon, which he also contributed to the soundtrack of.

In 2026, Hwang played the villainous supporting role of Yun Tae-geom, a dishonorably discharged sergeant skilled at martial arts, in the second season of Netflix action drama Bloodhounds.

=== Variety and reality shows ===
Chansung has appeared in various sports variety programs since 2010, beginning as a recurring Dream Team member in Let's Go! Dream Team Season 2. From 2013 to 2014, he appeared on the show Our Neighborhood Arts and Physical Education for the badminton series of episodes with his bandmate Nichkhun and for the taekwondo series of episodes. In 2023, Chansung was one of eight celebrities competing in the golfing-game show Golf Star K. In 2025, Chansung appeared with his bandmate Nichkhun on the second season of the golfing show To Die For.

From 2014 to 2015, Chansung was cast on Chinese variety programs. He was paired with Chinese actress Liu Yan in the first season of the celebrity dating show Perhaps Love in 2014. In 2015, he was cast for the Chinese variety show Let's Go Together!, which frequently brought Korean and Chinese celebrities as guests.

=== Other activities ===
On June 1, 2012, JYP Entertainment announced through their official Twitter that Hwang would be opening a fitness center located in Nonhyeon-dong, Seoul with his weight trainer, Hwang Mo.

On December 15, 2021, Hwang announced that he would be ending his contract with JYP Entertainment in January 2022. On March 3, 2022, Hwang signed an exclusive contract with L' July Entertainment. On October 10, 2023, it was announced that Hwang had signed an exclusive contract with HIAN Inc. to manage his activities within Japan.

In August 2022, Hwang opened a YouTube cooking channel called "I Approve of This Dish". In 2023, his YouTube cooking series was broadcast in nine countries across East and Southeast Asia on tvN Asia. In 2024, it was also broadcast on Japanese streaming service Rakuten TV.

In December 2022, Hwang held his first solo photo exhibition titled "Nahc Nahc" at the exhibition hall on the 3rd floor of AK Plaza in Hongdae from January 6–12, 2023.

== Personal life ==
=== Military service ===
Hwang enlisted in the army for his mandatory military service on June 11, 2019, and he was discharged on January 5, 2021.

=== Marriage and family ===
On December 15, 2021, Hwang announced his fiancée's pregnancy and their engagement via his Instagram. Their first child, a daughter, was born on July 26, 2022.

== Filmography ==
=== Film ===
Year	Title	Role	Notes	Ref.
2014	Red Carpet	Kim Dae-yoon		
2014	A Dynamite Family	Soo-geun		
2015	I Wanna Hold Your Hand	Ji-oh	Korean-Chinese film; Cameo	
2015	The Last Snow of Winter	Yoon Tae-oh	Japanese film	
2017	Midnight Runners	Himself	Cameo	
2019	Rose and Tulip	Jin Il	Japanese film; Cameo	
2023	Hong Kong Within Me	Chan-sung	Short film	
2025	Dare Yori mo Tsuyoku Dakishimete	Lee Jae-hong	Japanese film	
2025	Sumbisori		Cameo	

=== Television series ===
Year	Title	Role	Notes	Ref.
2006	High Kick!	Hwang Chan-sung		
2008	Jungle Fish	Park Young-sam		
2011	Dream High	Oh-sun's imaginary boy	Cameo (Episode 12)	
2011	Kaitō Royale	Jack	Japanese drama	
2013	7th Grade Civil Servant	Gong Do-ha		
2013	Votre Noir	Kim Hyung-joo		
2016	My Horrible Boss	Nam Bong-gi		
2016	Dr. Romantic	Young Gyun	Special appearance (Episodes 8, 11–12)	
2017	Suspicious Partner	Jang Hee-joon	Special appearance	
2017	Queen for Seven Days	Seo-no		
2018	What's Wrong with Secretary Kim	Go Gwi-nam		
2019	Touch Your Heart	Chansung	Cameo (Episodes 3, 5)	
2020	My Holo Love	Baek Chan-sung		
2021	Vincenzo	Actor	Cameo (Episode 12); with Nichkhun	
2021	So I Married the Anti-fan	JJ		
2021–2022	Show Window: The Queen's House	Han Jung-won		
2022	Now, We Are Breaking Up	Kim Soo-min	Cameo (Episode 16)	
2023	True to Love	Noh Joo-wan		
2024	Jun Kissa Inyeon	Si U	Japanese drama	
2024	Bitter Sweet Hell	Noh Young-min		
2024	Seoul Busters	Kang Min-jae		
2025	Ms. Incognito	Lee Se-jun	Cameo (Episode 8)	
2026	Bloodhounds	Yun Tae-geom	Season 2	
2026	Yumi's Cells	Yun PD	Cameo (Season 3 Episode 1)	

=== Web series ===
Year	Title	Role	Notes	Ref.
2015	Dream Knight	Himself	Cameo (Episode 3)	
2018	Secret Queen Makers	Chansung		
2018	Romance Written Differently	Himself		

=== Variety and reality shows ===
Year	Title	Role	Notes	Ref.
2006	Superstar Survival	Contestant		
2008–2009	Introducing the Star's Friends	Main cast	Episodes 21, 26, 50–57	
2009	Hello! Project Korea Auditions	Host	For Hello! Project; with Lee Jun-ho	
2009	Kko Kko Tours Single Single (Season 2)	Main cast	Episodes 7-10	
2010	M Countdown	Host	Rotating host; with Nichkhun, Lee Jun-ho, Jo Kwon, Jeong Jin-woon, Kang Min-hyuk, Lee Joon, G.O	
2010	Let's Go! Dream Team Season 2	Main cast	Dream Team cast	
2013–2014	Our Neighborhood Arts and Physical Education	Main cast	Episodes 14–24 (Badminton series), 39–40 (Badminton Returns series), 46–52 (Taekwondo series), 2014 Special	
2014	Perhaps Love (Season 1)	Main cast	Chinese variety show; Episodes 1–13; with Liu Yan	
2015–2016	Let's Go Together	Main cast	Chinese variety show; Episodes 1–13	
2016	Law of the Jungle in Tonga	Main cast	Episodes 208–211	
2018	One Night Food Trip (Season 3)	Main cast	Episodes 5–8	
2018	Sound of Grazing Grass Season 2: Autumn	Main cast	Episodes 1–10	
2019	Nemo Travel: A Trip to the Maldives	Main cast	Episodes 1–6; with Nichkhun and Jung Gun-joo	
2021	K-Pop Generation	Interviewee	With Jun. K, Nichkhun, and Jang Wooyoung	
2023	Chansung's Cooking	Host	Originally YouTube web series; released in Japan in 2024 under the title Chansung's Kitchen (チャンソンのキッチン)	
2023	Golf Star K	Main cast	Episodes 1–6	
2025	To Die For (Season 2)	Main cast		

== Theater ==
Year	Title	Role	Notes	Ref.
2017	My Love My Bride	Youngmin		
2017	Altar Boyz	Matthew	Japanese and Korean versions	
2018	Interview	Sinclair	Japanese version	
2018	Smoke	Hae		

== Discography ==
=== Studio albums ===
Title	Album details	Peak chart positions	Sales
Title	Album details	JPN	Sales
Dawn	Released: October 29, 2025; Label: Avex Trax; Format: CD, digital download; Track listing: 1. "Into the Fire"; 2. "Amaku Setsunaku Tsuyoku" (甘く 切なく 強く feat. Jun. K; Sweet, Sad, Strong); 3. "Forget-me-not" (song by Yutaka Ozaki); 4. "Korekara No Kimi No Tameni" (これからの君のために; For You, In the Future); 5. "Angel"; 6. "That Joy"; 7. "Life Race" (Japanese ver.); 8. "Tell Me Your Reason" (Japanese ver.); 9. "Love the Way U Move"; 10. "My Everything"; 11. "Kieteikukimie" (消えていく君へ; To You Who Are Disappearing; Japanese ver.); 12. "Fine" (Japanese ver.)	38	JPN: 910

=== Extended plays ===
Title	EP details	Peak chart positions		Sales
Title	EP details	JPN	JPN Hot	Sales
Complex	Released: May 23, 2018; Label: Epic Records Japan; Format: CD, digital download; Track listing: 1. "Treasure"; 2. "Fireworks"; 3. "Nandodemo" (何度でも; Numerous Times); 4. "Fading Away"; 5. "Yoru Ni" (夜に); 6. "Treasure" (instrumental); 7. "Baby" (Limited Edition B); 8. "Mayday" (Chansung ver.; Limited Edition B); 9. "Make Love" (Chansung ver.; Limited Edition B); 10. "Shining Star" (Chansung ver.; fan club limited edition)	8	9	JPN: 16,002

=== Singles ===
Title	Details	Peak chart positions
Title	Details	JPN
"Into the Fire"	Released: April 24, 2024 (JPN); Label: Avex Trax; Formats: CD, digital download; Track listing: 1. "Into the Fire"; 2. "Into the Fire" (DJ Ryow & Space Dust Club remix); 3. "Into the Fire" (instrumental)	18
"Korekara no Kimi no Tameni" (これからの君のために; For You, In the Future)	Released: December 4, 2024 (JPN); Label: Avex Trax; Format: CD, digital download; Track listing: 1. "Korekara No Kimi No Tameni" (これからの君のために; For You, In the Future); 2. "My Everything"; 3. "Korekara No Kimi No Tameni" (これからの君のために; For You, In the Future; unplugged ver.); 4. "Korekara No Kimi No Tameni" (これからの君のために; For You, In the Future; instrumental); 5. "My Everything" (instrumental)	11
"Withdrawal Symptoms of Longing" (思念戒断反应)	Released: August 26, 2025 (CHN); Label: Hangzhou Guangying Suiyue Culture Media Co.; Format: Digital download; Track listing: 1. "Withdrawal Symptoms of Longing" (思念戒断反应); 2. "Withdrawal Symptoms of Longing" (思念戒断反应; instrumental)	—
"Far Away"	Released: October 15, 2025 (CHN); Label: Hangzhou Guangying Suiyue Culture Media Co.; Format: Digital download; Track listing: 1. "Far Away"; 2. "Far Away" (instrumental)	—
"—" denotes releases that did not chart.

=== Collaborations ===
Year	Artist	Song title	Album
2010	Joo feat. Chansung	"Not Even In The Movies" (영화도 안보니)	Heart Made
2011	2AM feat. Chansung	"To Her" (그녀에게)	Can't Let You Go Even If I Die
2024	Chansung & AK-69 feat. Lee Chang-min	"Into the Fire"	Non-album single

=== Compositions ===
Release date	Title	Artist	Album
May 6, 2013	"Coming Down"	2PM	Grown
May 6, 2013	"Perfume"	Chansung	Grown (Grand Edition)
September 15, 2014	"Mine"	2PM	Go Crazy!
September 15, 2014	"Boyfriend"	2PM	Go Crazy!
September 15, 2014	"The Word, Love" (사랑한단 말)	Chansung & Taecyeon	Go Crazy! (Grand Edition)
September 15, 2014	"Please Come Back"	Chansung & Taecyeon feat. Baek A-yeon	Go Crazy! (Grand Edition)
June 15, 2015	"Hotter Than July" (여름보다 뜨거운 너; Yeoreumboda tteugeonun neo)	2PM	No.5
June 15, 2015	"Wanna Love You Again"	2PM	No.5
June 15, 2015	"Good Man"	2PM	No.5
April 27, 2016	"Shining Star"	2PM	Galaxy of 2PM
September 13, 2016	"Uneasy"	2PM	Gentlemen's Game
September 13, 2016	"Make Love"	2PM	Gentlemen's Game
September 13, 2016	"Can't Stop Feeling"	2PM	Gentlemen's Game

== Concerts and fan meetings ==
=== Concerts ===
- Complex (2018)
- Dawn ~The First Step~ (2025)

=== Fan meetings ===
- DJ Chansung's Naughty Music Camp (2018)
- Music Bless You (2018)
- TMC: Too Much Chanformation (2019)
- CSBS (2023)
- Chanie's Bear Museum (2024)
- Lucky Chan's Day (2026)

== Awards and nominations ==
Year	Award	Category	Nominated work	Result	Ref.
2010	Korea Jewelry Awards	Diamond Awards	Nichkhun and Chansung	Won	
2010	Men's Health	Best Cover Model	—N/a	Won	
2013	49th Baeksang Arts Awards	Most Popular Actor (TV)	—N/a	Nominated	
2018	11th Korea Drama Awards	Excellence Award, Actor	What's Wrong with Secretary Kim	Won	
2018	11th Korea Drama Awards	Hallyu Star	What's Wrong with Secretary Kim	Won	
