= Ballad 21 F/W =

- Digital cover

EP by 2AM
- Released: November 1, 2021
- Recorded: 2021
- Language: Korean
- Labels: Culture Depot; Stone Music

2AM chronology
Let's Talk (2014)	Ballad 21 F/W (2021)

Singles from Ballad 21 F/W
- 1. "Should've Known" Released: November 1, 2021; 2. "No Good in Good-Bye" Released: November 1, 2021

Ballad 21 F/W is the fourth extended play (EP) by South Korean boy group, 2AM, released on November 1, 2021. It was the first release by 2AM since their album, Let's Talk, in 2014.

== Background ==
On October 7, 2021, member Lee Chang-min announced that 2AM was preparing to make a comeback. Shortly after, it was reported the group had already recorded two title tracks, one written by Bang Si-hyuk and one by Park Jin-young.

On October 12, 2AM released a time table to social media, confirming that they would be releasing a new EP on November 1, 2021, with both music videos which would star 2PM member Junho and actor Kim So-hyun.

== Release and promotion ==
2AM began music show promotions at M Countdown, where they performed the two title tracks "Should've Known" and "No Good In Good-bye". The group performed the two songs in succeeding music shows Music Bank, Show! Music Core.

On November 4, 2021, the group appeared in web show IU's Palette where host IU covered the group's 2008 b-side "What Should I Do" from the repackage album I Was Wrong, while they covered IU's 2011 hit single "Hold My Hand". On the same day, the group guested on the 74th episode of Jessi's Showterview where they simultaneously promoted Ballad 21 F/W.

== Track listing ==
Ballad 21 F/W track listing
No.	Title	Lyrics	Music	Arrangement	Length
1.	"Should've Known" (가까이 있어서 몰랐어; Gakkai Isseoseo Mollasseo)	"Hitman" Bang	"Hitman" Bang	Score; Megatone	3:41
2.	"No Good in Good-Bye" (잘 가라니; Jal Garani)	J.Y. Park "The Asiansoul"	J.Y. Park "The Asiansoul"	Hong Ji-sang; Lee Woo-min "Collapsedone"	3:32
3.	"I Can't" (못 지; Mot Ja; lit. 'Can't Sleep')	KZ; Jung Da-woon; 미친감성; Surin	KZ; Jung Da-woon; 미친감성; Kim Hye-kwang	KZ; Jung Da-woon; 미친감성	3:41
4.	"Always Me"	Jeong Jinwoon	Jeong Jinwoon; Shin Yo-han	Shin Yo-han	3:50
5.	"Proposal" (청혼; Cheonghon)	Surin; Hong Sang-yi; Lee Ji-hye	Armadillo; Peridot; Jeon Sang-min; Nail Lee	Armadillo	3:14
Total length:					18:01

== Charts ==
Chart performance for Ballad 21 F/W
Chart (2021)	Peak position
South Korean Albums (Gaon)	34

== Release history ==
Release history and formats for Ballad 21 F/W
Region	Date	Format	Label
Various	November 1, 2021	Digital download; streaming	Culture Depot; Stone Music Entertainment
South Korea	November 1, 2021	CD	Culture Depot; Stone Music Entertainment
