= Let's Talk (album) =

- Standard Cover

Studio album by 2AM
- Released: October 30, 2014
- Recorded: 2014
- Genre: Pop
- Length: 45:00
- Language: Korean
- Label: JYP Entertainment

2AM chronology
Nocturne (2013)	Let's Talk (2014)	Ballad 21 F/W (2021)

Singles from Let's Talk
- 1. "Days Like Today" Released: October 26, 2014; 2. "Over the Destiny" Released: October 29, 2014

Let's Talk is the third studio album by South Korean boyband, 2AM. The album was released on October 30, 2014, preceded by the singles "Days Like Today" and "Over the Destiny." It was the group's first album released under JYP Entertainment after their departure in 2009, though they would once again separate from the label the following year.

== Background ==
On October 22, 2014, 2AM released the teaser for their song "Days Like Today," which was said to be a pre-release track for their upcoming album. The song, released on, October 26, marked the first time in five years that the group collaborated with their original founder, Park Jin-young.

On October 29, the group posted a spoiler video, which allowed fans to listen to snippets of each track from the album. The album was officially released on October 30, 2014, with the group holding a comeback stage on Music Bank on October 31st.

== Reception ==
The album sold over 7,835 copies in Korea, and peaked at number six at the Gaon Chart.

== Track listing ==
No.	Title	Length
1.	"To.AM (For You)"	0:59
2.	"Days Like Today" (오늘따라)	3:45
3.	"Over the Destiny" (나타나 주라)	4:24
4.	"Happy End" (해피엔드)	3:26
5.	"Realized" (실감)	3:22
6.	"Love Actually" (내 사랑은 말야)	3:01
7.	"All Right"	3:10
8.	"the Day" (이별 그 날)	3:51
9.	"I Know"	4:35
10.	"Be My Lady" (찜했어 Changmin solo)	3:34
11.	"Dance" (Jo Kwon solo)	3:26
12.	"Ready" (준비 Jinwoon solo)	4:50
13.	"Loveskin" (Seulong solo)	3:34
Total length:		45:00
