= One Day (2AM and 2PM song) =

- Regular edition cover

Single by One Day (2AM and 2PM)
- B-side: "No Goodbyes"
- Released: July 4, 2012
- Recorded: 2012
- Genre: J-pop; Dance-pop
- Length: 3:42
- Label: Ariola Japan
- Songwriters: Super Changddai; Faya; Yu Shimoji; Michael Yano
- Producer: Super Changddai

2PM singles chronology
"Beautiful" (2012)	"One Day" (2012)	"Masquerade" (2012)

2AM singles chronology
"Denwa ni Denai Kimi ni" (2012)	"One Day" (2012)	"For You: Kimi no Tame ni Dekiru Koto" (2012)

"One Day" is a Japanese single by the South Korean boy groups 2AM and 2PM, collectively known as One Day, released on July 4, 2012 by Ariola Japan. The song is the main theme song for the documentary Beyond the One Day ~Story of 2PM & 2AM~, which was released in Japan on June 30.

== Background and release ==
Prior to both groups' debuts, the members of 2AM and 2PM previously starred as JYP Entertainment trainees in a 2008 reality show on Mnet titled Hot Blooded Men, in which the public would vote on which members would eventually debut. By the end of the training process, the remaining members became a group known as One Day, although the group would eventually get split into the ballad-focused group 2AM and the dance-oriented group 2PM.

Following both groups' Japanese-language debuts, the two groups began filming the documentary Beyond the One Day in Japan in April 2012. The documentary focused on both groups' rise to fame, featuring content such as bonus footage from the JYP Nation in Japan 2011 concert, the first time both groups performed as One Day in Japan. The film, directed by Shoichi Omichi and distributed by Toho Pictures, premiered on June 7, 2012, before being released for theaters on June 30, 2012.

The theme song of the film, "One Day", was first used in a trailer for the film released on May 8, 2012. A ringtone version of the song was released on June 12, 2012. The song was later released as a single on July 4, 2012, in twelve editions:

- Regular edition is the CD single with a bonus track.
- Type A is a CD + DVD,
- Type B is the CD single with a front cover artwork of 2PM's member Jun. K,
- Type C is the CD single with a front cover artwork of 2PM's member Nichkhun,
- Type D is the CD single with a front cover artwork of 2PM's member Taecyeon,
- Type E is the CD single with a front cover artwork of 2PM's member Wooyoung,
- Type F is the CD single with a front cover artwork of 2PM's member Junho,
- Type G is the CD single with a front cover artwork of 2PM's member Chansung,
- Type H is the CD single with a front cover artwork of 2AM's member Changmin,
- Type I is the CD single with a front cover artwork of 2AM's member Seulong,
- Type J is the CD single with a front cover artwork of 2AM's member Jo Kwon,
- Type K is the CD single with a front cover artwork of 2AM's member Jinwoon,

== Composition ==
"One Day" is an original Japanese song composed by Super Changddai, who previously worked on several songs for both groups. The B-side track "No Goodbyes" is an original Japanese song composed by 2PM member Jun. K. "Angel", a CD-only bonus track, is originally a Korean song from 2PM's debut single album Hottest Time of the Day (2008) that was performed live by both groups at the JYP Nation in Japan 2011 concert.

== Track listing ==
Type A to K track list
No.	Title	Lyrics	Music	Length
1.	"One Day"	Super Changddai; Faya; Yu Shimoji; Michael Yano	Super Changddai	3:42
2.	"No Goodbyes"	Jun. K; Emyli	Jun. K	3:36
3.	"One Day" (without main vocal)		Super Changddai	3:42
4.	"No Goodbyes" (without main vocal)		Jun. K	3:33
Total length:				14:33

CD-only track list
No.	Title	Lyrics	Music	Length
1.	"One Day"	Super Changddai; Faya; Yu Shimoji; Michael Yano	Super Changddai	3:42
2.	"No Goodbyes"	Jun. K, Emyli	Jun. K	3:36
3.	"Angel" (song by 2PM) (Live from JYP Nation in Japan 2011)	Kwon Tae-eun, Jang Geun-yi	Kwon Tae-eun	4:06
4.	"One Day" (without main vocal)		Super Changddai	3:42
5.	"No Goodbyes" (without main vocal)		Jun. K	3:33
Total length:				18:39

DVD
No.	Title	Length
1.	"One Day" (music video)
2.	"One Day" (music video - movie version)

== Charts ==
=== Oricon ===
Oricon Chart	Peak	Debut sales	Sales total
Daily Singles Chart (1st day of release)	5	29,721	66,224+
Daily Singles Chart (7th day of release)	3	1,286	66,224+
Weekly Singles Chart	5	54,734	66,224+
Monthly Singles Chart	13	64,911	66,224+
Yearly Singles Chart	123	66,224	66,224+

=== Other charts ===
Chart	Peak position	Ref.
Japan Billboard Japan Hot 100	5	
Japan RIAJ Digital Track Chart	28	

== Release history ==
Country	Date	Format	Label
Japan	July 4, 2012	CD, Digital download	Ariola Japan
