= Nocturne (EP) =

- Korean release cover

EP by 2AM
- Released: November 27, 2013
- Recorded: 2013
- Genre: K-pop
- Length: 18:00
- Language: Korean
- Label: Big Hit Entertainment

2AM chronology
| One Spring Day (2013) | Nocturne (2013) | Let's Talk (2014) |

Singles from Nocturne
- 1. "Just Stay" Released: November 19, 2013; 2. "Regret" Released: November 27, 2013

Nocturne is the third EP by South Korean boy band 2AM. It was released in November 27, 2013 with the song "Regret" as the title track. Prior to the official release of their third EP, 2AM pre-released 'Just Stay' from their third mini album 'Nocturne' on November 19, 2013. 'Just Stay' is a soft R&B that is calm and soothing. It is about a girl who is having troubles with her lover and a man who is in love with that girl. The song 'Only You' is reminiscent of nineties K-Pop and R&B, which makes this one of the standout tracks in regard to the evolution of 2AM. 'To An Angel' is also more uptempo than the songs that 2AM is known for and is a solid pop song. 'You’re Prettier The More I See You' is very jazzy. It's the last 2AM album to be released under Big Hit, before their transition back to JYP Entertainment.

== Track listing ==
Korean & Japan Special Edition
| No. | Title | Lyrics | Music | Arrangement | Length |
|---|---|---|---|---|---|
| 1. | "Just Stay" (그냥 있어줘; Geu-nyang I-sseo-jwo) | Ra.D | Ra.D, d.ear | Yoo Woongryeol (유웅렬), d.ear | 3:56 |
| 2. | "Regret" (후회할거야; Ho-hwe-hal-keo-ya ) | Hwanggeum Doohyeon, Noneun Eorinie, Hitman 'Bang' | Oh Hyeonho, Hwanggeum Doohyeon, Noneun Eorinie | Oh Hyeonho, Hwanggeum Doohyeon, Noneun Eorinie | 3:16 |
| 3. | "You’re Prettier The More I See You" (볼수록 예뻐; Bol-soo-rok Yeh-ppeo) | Jang Wongyu, Jerry L | Igie, Jang Wongyu | Jang Wongyu | 3:13 |
| 4. | "To An Angel" (천사에게; Cheon-sa-eh-geh) | Jeong Jinwoon | Jeong Jinwoon | Son Yongjin, Im Sanghyeok, Jeong Jinwoon | 4:24 |
| 5. | "Only You" (너뿐이야; Neo-ppun-ie-ya) | Lee Changmin | Lee Changmin, Choi Jihoon, Miss Kay | Miss Kay | 3:09 |
| Total length: | | | | | 18:00 |
