= Perhaps Love (TV series) =

Chinese television show

- Also known as: Love House
- Genre: Reality television
- Presented by: Jeffrey G Nichkhun
- Country of origin: China
- Original language: Chinese
- No. of seasons: 4

Production
- Production locations: Sanya, Beijing, Taipei, Hong Kong, Singapore, Bali, Seoul, Jeju-si, Bangkok, Phuket, Chengdu, Shanghai, Macao, Ko Samui

Original release
- Network: Hubei Television
- Release: May 25, 2014 – March 18, 2018

Perhaps Love (Chinese: 如果爱) is a Chinese reality show that aired on Hubei Television from May 25, 2014 to March 18, 2018. it was a total of 4 seasons. The show was co-produced with CJ E&M from Korea.

== Broadcast timeline ==
Season	Period	Episode
1	May 25, 2014 - August 17, 2014	
2	July 2, 2015 - October 1, 2015	
3	September 15, 2016 - December 8, 2016	11
4	December 24, 2017 - March 18, 2018	11

== Format ==
Celebrities pair up, live and work together as they learn about other people and the love in their lives.

== Host ==
- Jeffrey G
- Nichkhun

== Cast member ==
=== Season 1 ===
Serial number	Artist guest	birthday	Hometown	Job
1	Liu Yan	November 8, 1980	Hengyang, Hunan, China	Actress, Singer
2	Fei	April 27, 1987	Haikou, Hainan, China	Singer (Member of miss A)
3	Li Zhang	June 8, 1984	Guilin, Guangxi, China	Actress
4	Jian Sun	May 23, 1983	Xi'an, Shaanxi, China	Actor
5	Sunny Wang	November 2, 1982	New York, New York, United States	Actor
6	Hwang Chan-sung	February 11, 1990	Seoul, South Korea	Singer (Member of 2PM)

=== Season 2 ===
Serial number	Artist guest	birthday	Hometown	Job
1	Fan Shiqi	March 23, 1992	Taobei District, Baicheng, Jilin, China	Singer
2	Lemon Zhang	December 29, 1988	Zhengzhou, Henan, China	Actress, Singer
3	Shawn Zhang	July 12, 1982	Qingdao, Shandong, China	Actor
4	Christy Chung	September 19, 1970	Montreal, Quebec, Canada	Actress
5	Lee Kwang-soo	July 14, 1985	Namyangju, Gyeonggi Province, South Korea	Actor, Cast members of Running Man
6	Lynn Hung	October 10, 1980	Nanjing, Jiangsu, China	Actress

=== Season 3 ===
Serial number	Artist guest	birthday	Hometown	Job
1	Kim Hee-chul	July 10, 1983	Wonju, Gangwon-do, South Korea	Singer (Member of Super Junior)
2	Li Feier	October 3, 1987	Liaoning, China	Actress
3	Fu Xinbo	March 5, 1987	Xi'an, Shaanxi, China	Singer (Member of BoBo)
4	Ying Er	December 12, 1988	Changde, Hunan, China	Actress
5	Shawn Zhang	July 12, 1982	Qingdao, Shandong, China	Actor
6	Christy Chung	September 19, 1970	Montreal, Quebec, Canada	Actress

=== Season 4 ===
Serial number	Artist guest	birthday	Hometown	Job
1	Henry Lau	October 11, 1989	Toronto, Ontario, Canada	Singer (Member of Super Junior-M)
2	Chen Duling	October 18, 1993	Xiamen, Fujian, China	Actress
3	Li Mao	June 2, 1986	Hefei, Anhui, China	Actor
4	Zhang Xianzi	April 22, 1986	Debao County, Baise, Guangxi, China	Singer
