= Glam (group) =

South Korean girl group

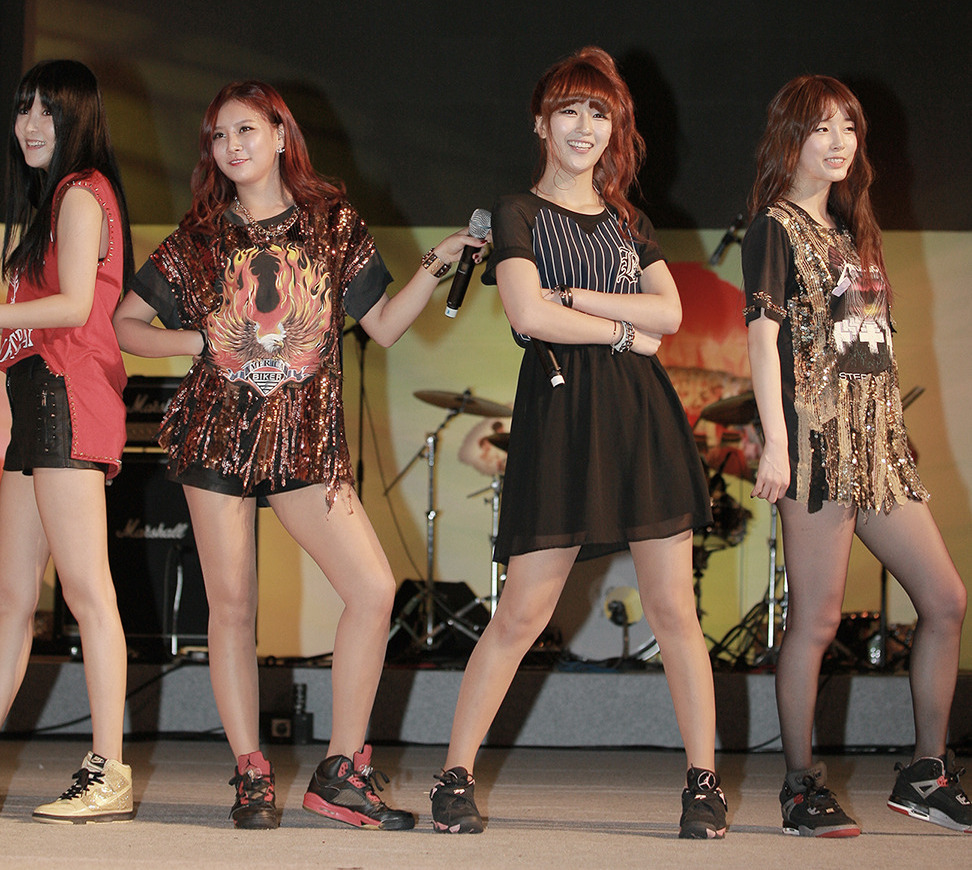

Background information
- Origin: South Korea
- Genres: K-pop; hip hop; dance-pop
- Years active: 2010–2015
- Labels: Source; Big Hit
- Past members: Trinity; Jiyeon; Zinni; Dahee; Miso

Glam (Korean: 글램; stylized in all caps) was a South Korean girl group formed by Source Music and produced by Big Hit Entertainment (now Hybe).

The group originally consisted of five members: Zinni, Trinity, Jiyeon, Dahee, and Miso. They were jointly launched by Source Music, becoming the first girl group under the label, and Big Hit Entertainment.

Glam officially debuted on July 16, 2012, with the single “Party (XXO).” The group gained attention for its progressive lyrics and genre-blending musical style.

Member Trinity left the group shortly after debut, and Glam continued as a four-member group.

In 2014, member Dahee was involved in a high-profile blackmail case involving actor Lee Byung-hun, which resulted in a prison sentence. The group disbanded shortly thereafter, in January 2015.

The group's name, "GLAM," is an acronym for "Girls be Ambitious."

== History ==
=== 2010–2011: Pre-debut ===
Before their official debut, Glam was featured on 2AM’s song "Just Me" from the boy band's 2010 album, Saint o'Clock.

In 2011, Glam and a pre-debut BTS were featured on Lee Hyun’s track "Bad Girl" from his album You Are Best of My Life.

The group also garnered attention when member Dahee provided the voice for the Vocaloid 3 product SeeU, the first Korean-language Vocaloid.

=== 2012–2013: Debut, digital singles and Trinity’s departure ===
In 2012, Glam starred in the reality show Real Music Drama: GLAM, which aired on SBS MTV from June 6 until the group’s official debut.

On July 16, 2012, Glam officially debuted with the release of their first single, "Party (XXO)." Later that year, they released the song "The Person I Miss" for the soundtrack of the Korean drama Five Fingers.

On December 31, 2012, Source Music and Big Hit Entertainment announced that member Trinity would be leaving the group for personal reasons. Glam continued as a four-member group.

On January 2, 2013, the group released their second single, "I Like That," which sampled "Why Do You" by Chuli and Miae.

On March 15, 2013, Glam made their second comeback of the year with the single "In Front of the Mirror," a genre-blending track that incorporated elements of Europop, trot, and hip hop.

=== 2015: Disbandment ===
On January 15, 2015, Glam's agency confirmed that the members had terminated their contracts, and the group had officially disbanded.

== Controversies ==
=== Blackmailing scandal ===
On September 2, 2014, actor Lee Byung-hun accused two women of attempting to blackmail him using a compromising video as leverage. Dahee, a member of Glam, and model Lee Ji-yeon were later identified as the women involved and were charged with attempting to extort ₩5 billion from the actor.

On January 15, 2015, the Seoul District Court sentenced Dahee to one year in prison.

On March 26, 2015, following a request for leniency by Lee Byung-hun, the Seoul District Court reduced Dahee’s sentence to a two-year suspended sentence.

== Discography ==
=== Singles ===
Title	Year	Peak chart positions		Sales (DL)
Title	Year	KOR Gaon	KOR Hot 100	Sales (DL)
"Party (XXO)"	2012	66	—	KOR: 59,641+
"I Like That"	2013	57	54	KOR: 75,850+
"In Front of the Mirror" (거울앞에서)	2013	37	47	KOR: 84,962+
"Give It 2 U"	2014	—	79	—N/a
"—" denotes release did not chart.

=== Soundtrack appearances ===
Title	Year	Album
"The Person I Miss" (그리운 사람)	2012	Five Fingers OST

=== Collaborations ===
Title	Year	Album
"Just Me" (바로 나야) 2AM feat. Glam	2010	Saint o'Clock
"Bad Girl" Lee Hyun feat. Glam & BTS	2011	You Are the Best of My Life

== Filmography ==
=== Television ===
Year	Title	Role	Network
2012	Real Music Drama: GLAM	Themselves	SBS MTV
