= F. Scott Fitzgerald's Way of Love =

2012 extended play by 2AM

- Korean release cover

EP by 2AM
- Released: March 12, 2012
- Recorded: 2012
- Genre: K-pop
- Length: 21:27
- Language: Korean
- Label: Big Hit Entertainment

2AM chronology
Saint o'Clock (2010)	F. Scott Fitzgerald's Way of Love (2012)	Voice (2013)

Singles from F. Scott Fitzgerald's Way of Love
- 1. "I Wonder If You Hurt Like Me" Released: March 12, 2012

F. Scott Fitzgerald's Way of Love: Japan Special Edition

EP by 2AM
- Released: August 8, 2012
- Recorded: 2012
- Genre: K-pop
- Length: 21:27
- Language: Korean
- Label: Big Hit Entertainment

2AM chronology
Saint o'Clock: Japan Special Edition (2011)	F. Scott Fitzgerald's Way of Love: Japan Special Edition (2012)	Voice (2013)

F. Scott Fitzgerald's Way of Love is the second EP by South Korean boy band 2AM. It was released on March 12, 2012 with the song "I Wonder If You Hurt Like Me" as the title track.

== Track listing ==
Korean & Japan Special Edition
No.	Title	Lyrics	Music	Arrangement	Length
1.	"You Were Mine" (내꺼였는데; Naekkeoyeonneunde)	Wheesung	Lee Sang-Ho, Choi Yong-Chan	Lee Sang-Ho, Choi Yong-Chan	3:30
2.	"I Wonder If You Hurt Like Me" (너도 나처럼; Neodo Nacheoreom)	Kim Do Hoon, The Hitman 'Bang'	Kim Do Hoon	Kim Do Hoon	3:48
3.	"Erase All Our Memories" (추억 다 지워; Chueok Da Jiwo)	Kwon Sool-Il	Kwon Sool-Il, Bak Yong-In	Bak Yong-In	3:27
4.	"One More Second" (1초만 더; 1 Choman Deo)	Park Seon-Joo	Park Seon-Joo	Kwon Tae-en	3:43
5.	"How To Break Up Well" (잘 이별하기; Jal Ibyeolhagi)	Yoon Jong-Shin	Yoon Jong-Shin	Miss Kay	3:40
6.	"I Love You, I Love You" (사랑해 사랑해; Saranghae Saranghae)	Changmin	Changmin	Miss Kay	3:22
Total length:					21:27

Japan Special Edition: Bonus track (regular edition only)
No.	Title	Length
7.	"I Wonder If You Hurt Like Me (Music Box ver.)"

Japan Special Edition – DVD
No.	Title	Length
1.	"I Wonder If You Hurt Like Me (Music Video)"
2.	"I Wonder If You Hurt Like Me Music Video オフショットムービー"

== Charts ==
=== Album chart ===
Chart	Peak position
Gaon Weekly album chart	1
Gaon Weekly domestic album chart	1

=== Single chart ===
Song	Peak chart position	
Song	KOR	KOR
Song	Gaon Chart	K-Pop Billboard
"I Wonder If You Hurt Like Me"	1	1

=== Other songs charted ===
Song	Peak chart position	
Song	KOR	KOR
Song	Gaon Chart	K-Pop Billboard
"You Were Mine"	4	10
"Erase All Our Memories"	14	35
"One More Second"	13	30
"How To Break Up Well"	9	24
"I Love You, I Love You"	15	27
