= I Was Wrong (2AM song) =

"Jalmot Haesseo 잘못했어 (I Was Wrong)"

Single by 2AM

from the album I Was Wrong
- Released: March 16, 2010
- Recorded: 2010
- Genre: K-pop, dance
- Length: 3:53
- Label: Big Hit Entertainment
- Songwriters: Hitman Bang (Lyrics and Music); Pdogg (Music); Wonderkid (Arrangement)

2AM Korean singles chronology
"Can't Let You Go Even If I Die" (2010)	"Jalmot Haesseo 잘못했어 (I Was Wrong)" (2010)	"You Wouldn't Answer My Calls" (2010)

I Was Wrong (Korean: 잘못했어; RR: Jalmot haesseo) is a song by South Korean ballad boyband 2AM, released off their repackaged mini-album I Was Wrong. The album was a repackaged album of the earlier Jugeodo Mot Bonae also known by its English title Can't Let You Go Even If I Die. "Jalmot Haesseo (I Was Wrong)" was a digital single on March 16, 2010.

== History ==
2AM revealed on March 5, 2010 through their official home page cuts of their new image. Jo Kwon, Changmin, Seulong, and Jinwoon respectively transformed as a club DJ, an ice hockey player, a biker, and a basketball player for their new 10-minute drama-music video. The repackaged mini-album features 4 additional songs, 3 from their first and second singles and one entirely new song titled "Jalmot Haesseo" ("잘못했어" - "I Was Wrong"), which would be their promoted track. One representative stated, “The song we’re releasing is something that 2AM has never shown before and is a brand new type of music.” A portion of the song was revealed in the first episode of 2AM's new reality show "2AM DAY" on March 10, where the members playfully sing along to it in their car.

== Music video ==
Four teasers were released for each member from March 12 to March 14. A leaked version of Part 1 of the music video was released on March 15, having been recorded by camera at 2AM's subway showcase. The second part was released a few days later. The video shows the 2AM members suddenly falling for a girl they have always liked, until they start to fight about it, and the girl becomes overwhelmed with grief she commits suicide

== Promotions ==
2AM first performed "I Was Wrong" on M.net M!Countdown on March 18, 2010. As opposed to their previous singles which were ballads, dance choreography was performed to the song.

2AM won the Mutizen on M!Countdown on April 1, 2010. However, due to the ROKS Cheonan sinking near Baengnyeong Island, all music shows were canceled. Member Jinwoon expressed his deep sympathies for the families of the missing people in the group's acceptance speech, asking the public to pray.

== Track listing ==
Digital download:

1. "I Was Wrong" (잘못했어; Jalmot Haesseo) - 3:53

== Chart performance ==
The song debuted at number 2 in Gaon's Weekly singles chart and stayed in the position for two consecutive weeks. It ranked number 33 in Gaon's Yearly chart with 420,901,170 points.

=== Charts ===
Chart	Peak position
Gaon Weekly singles chart	2
Gaon Monthly singles chart	2
Gaon Yearly singles chart	33
