= Never Let You Go: Shindemo Hanasanai =

"Never Let You Go: Shindemo Hanasanai Never Let You Go ～死んでも離さない～"
- Regular edition cover

Single by 2AM

from the album Voice
- B-side: "Waratte Agerarenakute Gomen"
- Released: January 11, 2012
- Recorded: 2011
- Genre: Pop, dance-pop, J-pop
- Length: 3:16
- Label: Ariola Japan

2AM Japanese singles chronology
"Never Let You Go: Shindemo Hanasanai; Never Let You Go ～死んでも離さない～" (2012)	"Denwa ni Denai Kimi ni" (2012)

"Never Let You Go: Shindemo Hanasanai" (Never Let You Go ～死んでも離さない～) is the first Japanese single by South Korean boy band 2AM. It was released on January 11, 2012, in three different editions.

The title track is the Japanese version of their Korean single "Can't Let You Go Even If I Die".

Track 2 in this album is a Japanese version of "I'm Sorry I Can't Laugh for You" (웃어 줄 수가 없어서 미안하다; Useo Jul Suga Obseoseo Mianhada) which can be found on the Can't Let You Go Even If I Die EP.

== Track listing ==
Regular edition
No.	Title	Length
1.	"Never Let You Go: Shindemo Hanasanai"	3:16
2.	"Waratte Agerarenakute Gomen" (笑ってあげられなくてごめん)	3:04
3.	"Missing"	4:10
4.	"Never Let You Go ～死んでも離さない～" (without main vocal)	3:16
5.	"Waratte Agerarenakute Gomen" (笑ってあげられなくてごめん without main vocal)	3:02
Total length:		16:48

DVD Ver. A
No.	Title	Length
1.	"Never Let You Go ～死んでも離さない～" (Japanese ver. Music Video)
2.	"死んでも離さない" (Korean ver. Music Video)

Limited edition Ver. B is also a CD only version + 32p booklet.
