= Culture Depot =

Korean media company

- Culture Depot logo
- Type: Subsidiary
- Industry: Entertainment; Production; Exhibition planning; Performance
- Genre: Korean drama
- Founded: April 20, 2010; 16 years ago
- Headquarters: Hyundai Liberty House, Hannam-dong #1803, Dokseodang-ro 70, Yongsan District, Seoul, South Korea
- Key people: Kim Sun-jung (CEO)
- Products: TV series
- Services: TV series production; artist management
- Revenue: 4,277,070,000 won (December 2016)
- Number of employees: 12 (December 2016)
- Parent: Studio Dragon

Korean name
- Hangul: 문화창고
- Hanja: 文化倉庫
- RR: Munhwa changgo
- MR: Munhwa ch'anggo

Culture Depot (Korean: 문화창고) is a Korean drama production and artist management company. It is a subsidiary of Studio Dragon.

== History ==
Culture Depot was founded in 2010 as an exhibition and performance planning company. Since 2012, it worked as a management agency for actress Jun Ji-hyun following her departure from SidusHQ. In the following years, it expanded its actor lineup and signed television screenwriter Park Ji-eun.

In January 2016, Culture Depot was acquired by CJ E&M, and later branched into drama production. A few months later, the company was integrated into CJ E&M's then-newly launched subsidiary, Studio Dragon.

== Works ==
Year	Title	Original title	Network	Notes
2016	The Legend of the Blue Sea	푸른 바다의 전설	SBS TV	Co-produced with Studio Dragon
2019	Crash Landing on You	사랑의 불시착	tvN	Co-produced with Studio Dragon
2022	Anna	안나	Coupang Play	Co-produced with Content Map
2024	Queen of Tears	눈물의 여왕	tvN	Co-produced with Studio Dragon and Showrunners
TBA	Soul	혼	TBA	Co-produced with Studio Dragon, Studio AA, Baram Pictures, and Imaginus

== Managed people ==
=== Current ===
==== Actors ====
- Han Dong-ho (2018–present)
- Yoon Ji-min (2019–present)

==== Musician ====
- 2AM (2021–present)

==== Screenwriter ====
- Park Ji-eun (2015–present)

=== Former ===
- Jun Ji-hyun (2012–2022)
- Kim So-hyun (2021–2022)
- Seo Ji-hye (2018–2022)
- Yoon Ji-on (2018–2022)
- Claudia Kim (2018–2020)
- Ko So-young (2018–2019)
- Jo Jung-suk (2015–2018)
- Park Min-young (2013–2017)
