= Voice (2AM album) =

- Regular edition cover

Studio album by 2AM
- Released: January 9, 2013
- Recorded: 2011–2012
- Genre: J-Pop
- Length: 46:42
- Language: Japanese
- Label: Big Hit Entertainment, Ariola Japan

2AM chronology
F.Scott Fitzgerald's Way Of Love (2012)	Voice (2013)	One Spring Day (2013)

Singles from Voice
- 1. "Never Let You Go: Shindemo Hanasanai" Released: January 11, 2012; 2. "Denwa ni Denai Kimi ni" Released: April 11, 2012; 3. "For You: Kimi no Tame ni Dekiru Koto" Released: September 12, 2012; 4. "Darenimo Watasenai Yo" Released: December 5, 2012

Voice is the first Japanese studio album (and second overall) by South Korean boy band 2AM. The new album contains twelve songs including a song, "無邪気な笑顔で", self-composed by its member Chang Min. Originally in Korean lyrics but for the Japanese album release, the lyrics had been changed to Japanese. The other 3 new songs are First Love, Pretty Girl and "愛の歌がRadioから". The rest are songs from their 1st to 4th Japanese singles releases in the year 2012: "Never Let You Go: Shindemo Hanasanai", "Denwa ni Denai Kimi ni", "For You: Kimi no Tame ni Dekiru Koto" and "Darenimo Watasenai Yo".

== Track listing ==
Regular edition.
No.	Title	Length
1.	"For You: Kimi no Tame ni Dekiru Koto"	4:05
2.	"Denwa ni Denai Kimi ni"	3:57
3.	"Darenimo Watasenai Yo"	5:36
4.	"First Love"	3:36
5.	"Pretty Girl"	4:37
6.	"Waratte Agerarenakute Gomen"	3:03
7.	"Birthday"	3:55
8.	"Innocent Smile" (無邪気な笑顔で)	3:50
9.	"Kowaresou"	2:53
10.	"Winter Gift"	4:05
11.	"Never Let You Go: Shindemo Hanasanai"	3:17
12.	"Love Song from Radio" (愛の歌がRadioから)	3:43
Total length:		46:42

Bonus Track - regular edition only
No.	Title	Length
13.	"I Wonder If You Hurt Like Me" (君も僕のように Jap. ver. of 너도 나처럼; Neodo Nacheoreom)	3:54
Total length:		50:36

DVD Ver. A.
No.	Title	Length
1.	"2AM 1st Japan Tour "Never Let You Go" Live in 梅田芸術劇場"

DVD Ver. B.
No.	Title	Length
1.	"Voice making movie"
2.	"Music Video Off Shot History 2012"
3.	"For You ～君のためにできること～ Music Video (Drama ver.)"

== Charts ==
=== Oricon ===
Oricon Chart	Peak	Debut sales	Total sales
Daily Albums Chart	3	6,506 (Daily); 11,664 (Weekly)	-
Weekly Albums Chart	10	6,506 (Daily); 11,664 (Weekly)	-
