= Saint o'Clock =

2010 album by 2AM

Saint o'clock
- Standard Cover

Studio album by 2AM
- Released: October 26, 2010
- Recorded: 2010
- Length: 38:38
- Label: Big Hit Entertainment; LOEN Entertainment
- Producer: Hitman Bang

2AM chronology
I Was Wrong (2010)	Saint o'clock (2010)	F.Scott Fitzgerald's Way Of Love (2012)

Singles from Saint o'clock
- 1. "You Wouldn't Answer My Calls" Released: October 25, 2010; 2. "Like Crazy" Released: October 26, 2010

Saint o'clock: Japan Special Edition

Studio album by 2AM
- Released: November 9, 2011
- Length: 50:33
- Label: Big Hit Entertainment, Ariola Japan
- Producer: Hitman Bang

2AM chronology
Saint o'clock: Japan Special Edition (2011)	Never Let You Go: Shindemo Hanasanai (2012)

Saint o'Clock is the first studio album by South Korean boy band 2AM. The album was released in digital and physical format by October 26, 2010. The songs "You Wouldn't Answer My Calls" and "Like Crazy" were chosen as the title tracks.

== Track listing ==
No.	Title	Length
1.	"Phone" (Intro)	1:32
2.	"You Wouldn't Answer My Calls" (전활 받지 않는 너에게; Jeonhwal Batji Annneun Neoege)	3:52
3.	"Like Crazy" (미친 듯이; Michin Deusi)	2:51
4.	"Just Me" (바로 나야; Baro Naya (feat. GLAM))	4:17
5.	"Mirage"	3:26
6.	"Can't Love You Again" (다시 사랑하기엔; Dasi Saranghagien)	3:45
7.	"There Is Nothing More" (이젠 없다; Ijen Eopda)	4:13
8.	"Nervous" (불안하다; Buranhada)	3:56
9.	"Love U, Hate U" (feat. RM of BTS (방탄소년단, Bangtan Sonyeondan))	3:14
10.	"With or Without U"	3:52
11.	"I Can't Say I Love You" (사랑한단 말 못해; Saranghandan Mal Motae)	3:17
Total length:		38:38

Special Limited Edition
No.	Title	Length
12.	"A Friend's Confession" (친구의 고백; Chingui Gobaek)	4:20
13.	"This Song" (이노래; Inurae)	4:05
Total length:		47:01

Japan Special Edition
No.	Title	Length
1.	"Phone" (Intro)	1:36
2.	"You Wouldn't Answer My Calls" (전활 받지 않는 너에게; Jeonhwal Batji Annneun Neoege)	3:55
3.	"Like Crazy" (미친 듯이; Michin Deusi)	2:52
4.	"I'm the One (Feat. GLAM)"	4:19
5.	"Mirage"	3:28
6.	"The Day I Confessed" (고백하던 날; Gobaekadeon Nal) (Jo Kwon solo)	3:30
7.	"There Is Nothing More" (이젠 없다; Ijen Eopda)	4:15
8.	"Nervous" (불안하다; Buranhada)	3:58
9.	"Love U, Hate U" (feat. Bulletproof Boy Scouts (방탄소년단))	3:16
10.	"With or Without U"	3:53
11.	"I Can't Say I Love You" (사랑한단 말 못해; Saranghandan Mal Motae)	3:21
12.	"A Friend's Confession" (친구의 고백; Chingui Gobaek)	4:20
13.	"This Song" (이노래; Inurae; この歌)	4:05
14.	"Can't love you again"	3:45
Total length:		50:33

Japan Special Edition - DVD
No.	Title	Length
1.	"2AM's Live Footage from "JYP Nation in Japan 2011" Held in Saitama Super Arena" (さいたまスーパーアリーナで行われたJYP Nation in Japan 2011の2AMのLIVE映像)
2.	"Japan's Visit Members Off-Shot Video" (来日時のメンバーオフショット映像)

- On the Japanese edition of the album, the track "Can't Love You Again" was replaced by the Jo Kwon's solo song "The Day I Confessed", and moved for the last track of the album.

== Charts ==
=== Album chart ===
Chart	Peak position
Japan Oricon Daily album chart	3
Japan Oricon Weekly album chart	6
Japan Oricon Monthly album chart	46
South Korea Gaon Weekly album chart	2
South Korea Gaon Weekly domestic album chart	2
South Korea Gaon Yearly album chart	30

=== Single chart ===
Song	Peak
Song	KOR
Song	Gaon Chart
"You Wouldn't Answer My Calls"	1
"Like Crazy"	5
