= For You: Kimi no Tame ni Dekiru Koto =

"For You ～君のためにできること～ For You: Kimi no Tame ni Dekiru Koto"
- Regular edition cover

Single by 2AM

from the album Voice
- B-side: Birthday; Saiai
- Released: September 12, 2012
- Recorded: 2012
- Genre: Pop, dance-pop, J-pop
- Length: 4:04
- Label: Ariola Japan

2AM Japanese singles chronology
"One Day" (2012)	"For You ～君のためにできること～ For You: Kimi no Tame ni Dekiru Koto" (2012)	"Darenimo Watasenai Yo" (2012)

For You: Kimi no Tame ni Dekiru Koto (For You ～君のためにできること～) is the fourth Japanese single (counted as third) by the South Korean boy band 2AM. It was released in September 12, 2012 in three different editions.

This title track is their first original Japanese single. Also included in this album is a remake of Fukuyama Masaharu 最愛 (Salai).

== Track listing ==
Regular edition.
No.	Title	Length
1.	"For You: Kimi no Tame ni Dekiru Koto"	4:04
2.	"Birthday"	3:56
3.	"最愛" (Salai)	5:13
4.	"For You ～君のためにできること～" (Instrumental)	4:01
5.	"Birthday" (Instrumental)	3:57
Total length:		21:11

Bonus Track - regular edition only
No.	Title	Length
6.	"For You ～君のためにできること～" (Autumn Leaves Instrumental ver.)	4:00
Total length:		25:11

DVD Ver. A
No.	Title	Length
1.	"For You ～君のためにできること～" (Original ver.)
2.	"For You ～君のためにできること～" (Lip Sync ver.)

Limited edition Ver. B is also a CD only version + 32p booklet.
