= One Spring Day =

- Standard Cover

Studio album by 2AM
- Released: 5 March 2013
- Recorded: 2013
- Genre: Pop
- Length: 31:45
- Language: Korean
- Label: Big Hit Entertainment

2AM chronology
Voice (2013)	One Spring Day (2013)	Nocturne (2013)

Singles from One Spring Day
- 1. "One Spring Day" Released: March 5, 2013

One Spring Day is the second Korean studio album (and third overall) by South Korean boy band 2AM. For this album, 2AM is planning for a musical transformation. A sneak preview of the song's introduction showcases Lim Seulong′s voice being prominent and different. The lead track is "One Spring Day", with a slow piano melody, for which a teaser video was released on 27 February 2013.

== Track listing ==
No.	Title	Length
1.	"Spring"	1:15
2.	"Reading You" (너를 읽어보다; neoleul ilg-eoboda)	3:30
3.	"Consolation" (위로; wilo)	4:26
4.	"One Spring Day" (어느 봄날; eoneu bomnal)	3:56
5.	"Sunshine"	3:44
6.	"Back Then" (그때; geuttae)	3:22
7.	"Forgetting You" (그대를 잊고; geudaeleul ijgo)	3:48
8.	"Coming To Me" (내게로 온다; naegelo onda)	3:48
9.	"One Spring Day" (inst.)	3:56
Total length:		31:45

== Chart performance ==
=== One Spring Day ===
References are as follows:

Singles Chart	Peak position
Billboard Korea	3
Gaon	3

=== Other charted songs ===
Song	Peak position	
Song	KOR	KOR
Song	Gaon Chart	K-Pop Billboard
"Reading You"	28	38
"Consolation"	51	63
"Forgetting You"	57	76
"Back Then"	58	67
"Sunshine"	70	97
"Coming To Me"	75	-
