= Darenimo Watasenai Yo =

"誰にも渡せないよ (Darenimo Watasenai Yo)"
- Regular edition cover

Single by 2AM

from the album Voice
- B-side: "Winter Gift"
- Released: December 5, 2012
- Recorded: 2012
- Genre: Pop, Dance-pop, J-pop
- Length: 5:35
- Label: Ariola Japan

2AM Japanese singles chronology
| "For You: Kimi no Tame ni Dekiru Koto" (2012) | "誰にも渡せないよ (Darenimo Watasenai Yo)" (2012) | "Voice" (2013) |

誰にも渡せないよ (Darenimo Watasenai Yo) is the fifth Japanese single (counted as fourth) by the South Korean boy band 2AM. It was released in December 5, 2012 in three different editions.

This title track is their second original Japanese single.

== Track listing ==
Regular edition.
| No. | Title | Length |
|---|---|---|
| 1. | "Darenimo Watasenai Yo" | 5:35 |
| 2. | "Winter gift" | 4:05 |
| 3. | "Everything" | 6:47 |
| 4. | "誰にも渡せないよ" (Instrumental) | 5:53 |
| 5. | "Winter gift" (Instrumental) | 4:05 |
| Total length: | | 26:25 |

Bonus Track - regular edition only
| No. | Title | Length |
|---|---|---|
| 6. | "誰にも渡せないよ" (Acoustic ver.) | 5:33 |
| Total length: | | 31:58 |

DVD Ver. A
| No. | Title | Length |
|---|---|---|
| 1. | "誰にも渡せないよ" (Original ver.) |
| 2. | "誰にも渡せないよ" (Lip Sync ver.) |

DVD Ver. B
| No. | Title | Length |
|---|---|---|
| 1. | "誰にも渡せないよ" (Original ver.) |
| 2. | "誰にも渡せないよ" (MUSIC VIDEO Off Shot Movie) |
