= 2AM (band) =

South Korean boyband

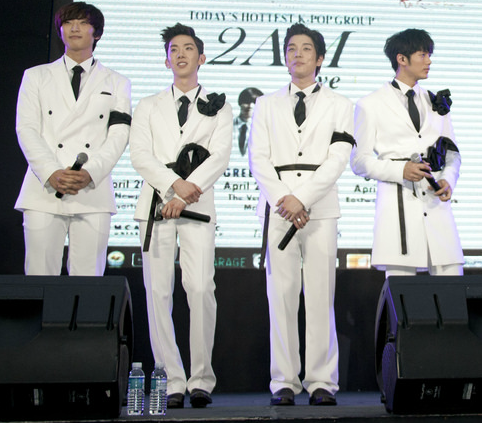
- 2AM in 2011 (L–R: Jinwoon, Jo Kwon, Changmin, and Seulong)

Background information
- Origin: Seoul, South Korea
- Genres: K-pop; R&B; soul
- Years active: 2008–2014; 2021–present
- Labels: Big Hit; JYP; Culture Depot; Ariola Japan; United Asia Management
- Spinoff of: One Day
- Members: Jo Kwon; Changmin; Seulong; Jinwoon

2AM (Korean: 투에이엠) is a South Korean boy band, that consists of Jo Kwon, Lee Chang-min, Lim Seul-ong, and Jeong Jin-woon. The band was formed by JYP Entertainment through the Mnet reality show Hot Blooded Men, which spawned the eleven-member boy band One Day; 2AM primarily perform ballad songs while their brother group 2PM performed more dance-focused music. With the addition of Changmin from Big Hit Entertainment, now known as Big Hit Music, the group was co-managed by JYP and Big Hit from 2008 to 2014. They officially debuted on July 11, 2008, on KBS' Music Bank, performing their debut single "This Song". The group also debuted in Japan with the single "Never Let You Go: Shindemo Hanasanai" in January 2012.

2AM's albums and singles were commercially successful. Several of their Korean albums have charted within the top ten in the Gaon Album Chart, with their album I Was Wrong (2010) marking their first number one album. Several of their singles have achieved high peaks at the Gaon Digital Chart, with "Can't Let You Go Even If I Die", "You Wouldn't Answer My Calls", and "I Wonder If You Hurt Like Me" topping the chart. Their Japanese singles have also peaked within the top ten of the Oricon Singles Chart.

After the group departed JYP and Big Hit, 2AM was put on hiatus as the members moved to different companies and labels and pursued solo careers. Their hiatus extended as most of the group took part in their mandatory military service. Following the end of their military service, the group reunited after seven years with their fourth extended play, Ballad 21 F/W (2021).

== Formation ==
Along with the members of 2PM, 2AM's Seulong, Jo Kwon, and Jinwoon appeared on the Mnet reality show Hot Blooded Men, which documented their rigorous training program during their pre-debut days. Changmin did not appear in the show because he had not joined JYP. Jinwoon was initially eliminated on Hot Blood, but he ended up in 2AM due to Daehun's withdrawal from JYPE.

== History ==
=== 2008–2010: Debut and early years ===
2AM's first single, "이 노래 (This Song)", was released on July 21, 2008. It was followed a year later by "Time For Confession", on March 19, 2009, with "친구의 고백 (Confession of a Friend)". In January 2010 the group released the EP Can't Let You Go Even If I Die (죽어도 못 보내), with a title track of the same name and four additional songs: three from their first and second singles and one new song titled "잘못했어 (I Was Wrong)", which was their promoted track. They won their first TV music program at Inkigayo on February 7 with "Can't Let You Go Even If I Die".

Through June and July 2010, 2AM opened for Wonder Girls on the second leg of their Wonder Girls World Tour. They are also featured in Made in Wonder Girls. On October 26, 2010, 2AM released their first full-length album entitled Saint o'Clock, with "전활 받지 않는 너에게 (You Wouldn't Answer My Calls)" and "미친 듯이 (Like Crazy)" as the lead singles.

=== 2011–2012: Asian career ===
Following the Korean success of their 2010 album Saint o'Clock, the group released a Japanese version on November 9, 2011. In January 2012, they released their first Japanese single "Never Let You Go: Shindemo Hanasanai", a Japanese version of the group's Korean single, "Even if I Die, I Can't Let You Go" (죽어도 못보내). It successfully entered both Oricon Daily Chart and Weekly Chart in the top 3. They released their second Korean EP F.Scott Fitzgerald's Way Of Love and released the music video for the lead track of the album, "I Wonder If You Hurt Like Me". In January 2012 they toured Japan, becoming the first K-Pop idol group to perform at Tokyo Bunkamura Orchard Hall.

The band followed up with the release of their second Japanese single "Denwa ni Denai Kimi ni (You Wouldn't Answer My Calls)" in Japan on April 11. The song immediately debuted on Oricon Daily charts at fourth place. The release included the Japanese version of "You Wouldn't Answer My Calls" and a cover Ken Hirai's "Close Your Eyes" (瞳をとじて).

In April 2012, 2PM and 2AM announced the release of the documentary film known as Beyond The One Day, in Japan. One Day refers to the group from which 2PM and 2AM both split. On April 13, they released the trailer for the film. This was followed up with the release of Japanese single for the theme song "One Day". In September 2012, 2AM released the third Japanese single For You: Kimi no Tame ni Dekiru Koto" their first original in Japanese. The title track "For You~君のためにできること~" was selected as the theme song for Japanese TBS drama NEO Soumatou Company which premiered on July 16. In the same year, 2AM held their first Asia concert tour, visiting Hong Kong, Taiwan, Japan and Malaysia. They recorded a Chinese version of the song "I Wonder If You Hurt Like Me (好痛) while Jokwon expressed some concerns about his pronunciation. It featured on the Asian version of their second EP F. Scott Fitzgerald's Way Of Love. In November 2012, prior to the concert in Japan, Seulong fractured a toe and performed in a wheelchair. The 4th Japanese single "Darenimo Watasenai Yo" was released in Japan on December 5, 2012.

=== 2013–2014: Japanese debut, One Spring Day, Nocturne, return to JYP, and Let's Talk ===
2AM released their first full-length Japan Album titled Voice on January 9, 2013. The album collected the tracks from their Japanese singles released to date and included four new songs; "First Love", "Pretty Girl", "愛の歌がRadioから", "無邪気な笑顔で" and Japanese version of "I Wonder If You Hurt Like Me (君も僕のように)". On March 5, 2013, 2AM released their second full-length album, One Spring Day. The album, containing nine tracks, is a collaboration with many artists, including pianist & composer Yiruma and Eptione Project. They also hosted SNL Korea on April 13, 2013. The band released their second EP, Nocturne, on November 19, 2013. The EP included five tracks. Due to member Jung Jinwoon's injury, 2AM did not promote the album on music programs.

Members Seulong, Jo Kwon, and Jinwoon all officially switched their contracts back to JYP Entertainment after their contracts with Big Hit Entertainment expired in April, while Changmin stayed with Big Hit due to his involvement with Homme. A new album, Let's Talk would be the first under JYP Entertainment, after releasing their previous albums with Big Hit Entertainment. Producer Park Jin Young composed several of the tracks, while the title song "Over The Destiny" was written for the group by Cho Kyumin. Days Like Today was released on October 27, followed by "Over The Destiny" on October 30, 2014.

=== 2015–2020: Hiatus ===
In March 2015, Seulong and Jinwoon decided not to renew their contracts with JYP Entertainment and would sign to other agencies. While Changmin ended his contract in August 2015, JYP Entertainment assured that the departures did not mean 2AM was breaking up.

On September 22, 2017, Jo Kwon parted ways with JYP Entertainment. Jo stated that, despite his departure from JYP Entertainment, 2AM had not disbanded and that the other members had clauses in their individual contracts which would allow them to promote as 2AM in the future.

On November 28, 2017, Seulong enlisted for his mandatory military service.

In August 2018, Jo Kwon enlisted to fulfil mandatory military service requirement.

On January 17, 2019, it was announced Jinwoon would enlist in March. He will be the final member to enlist, due to Changmin's service completion in 2008.

=== 2021–present: Return with Ballad 21 F/W ===
On May 20, 2021, CJ ENM subsidiary Culture Depot announced that 2AM will have a reunion, ending their indefinite hiatus. On September 16, the group was set to release a comeback but the release date of their song and album was not still decided.

On October 7, 2021, the comeback announcement was made by member Lee Chang-min. According to JTBC, the group already recorded two title tracks, one written by Bang Si-hyuk and one by Park Jin-young.

2AM's fourth EP Ballad 21 F/W was announced on October 12, via the groups brand-new Twitter account, set to be released on November 1 by Culture Depot and Stone Music Entertainment. The EP includes five songs, including the title tracks "Should've Known" and "No Good in Good-Bye".

On March 9, 2022, the group released the single "Though You're Gone", a cover of a song by Jo Jang-hyuk.

On December 28, 2023, it was revealed that the group would be collaborating with Day6 for a special performance at the 2023 MBC Music Festival on December 31. The following day, it was announced that the group would be releasing a new single, "If You Change Your Mind", on January 4, 2024.

On October 20, 2024, it was announced that the group would have a national concert tour in November called 2AM is Coming to Town.

== Other contributions ==
In April 2010, they participated in the original soundtrack of drama series Personal Taste with a ballad titled "바보처럼 (Like a Fool)", which also became a number one hit.

2AM was chosen to represent Asia on Listen Up! The Official 2010 Fifa World Cup Album with the song titled "No. 1". The song was digitally released on May 18, 2010. In October 2010, the group represented Korea and performed at the 7th Asia Song Festival, organised by Korea Foundation for International Culture Exchange, at the Seoul Olympic Stadium. In 2012, they were appointed as ambassadors for the World Conservation Congress.

== Discography ==
- Saint o'Clock (2010)
- Voice (2013)
- One Spring Day (2013)
- Let's Talk (2014)

== Concerts and tours ==
- 2AM 1st Tour "Saint' O Clock" (2010–2011)
- 2AM "Come On Christmas" Concert (2011)
- 2AM 1st Japan Tour "Never Let You Go" (2012)
- 2AM 1st Asia Tour "The Way Of Love" (2012)
- 2AM 1st World Tour "Nocturne Symphony Of The Night" (2013)
- 2AM Concert "22 S/S" (2022)
- 2AM is Coming to Town (2024)

=== JYP Nation ===
- 2014 JYP NATION - ONE MIC in Seoul
- 2012 JYP NATION Concert in Seoul

== Videography ==
List of music videos, showing year released and director
Title	Year	Director(s)	Ref.
Korean
"This Song"	2008	Unknown	
"What Should I Do"	2008	Unknown	
"Graduation"	2009	Unknown	
"A Friend's Confession"	2009	Unknown	
"Can't Let You Go Even If I Die"	2010	Hong Won-ki	
"I Was Wrong"	2010	Unknown	
"No.1"	2010	Hong Won-ki	
"You Wouldn't Answer My Calls"	2010	Unknown	
"Like Crazy"	2010	Hong Won-ki	
"I Wonder If You Hurt Like Me"	2012	Lee Gi-baek	
"One Spring Day"	2013	Hong Won-ki	
"Regret"	2013	Hong Won-ki	
"Days Like Today"	2014	Unknown	
"Over The Destiny"	2014	Unknown	
"Should've Known" (가까이 있어서 몰랐어)	2021	Unknown	
"No Good in Good-Bye" (잘 가라니)	2021	Unknown	
Japanese
"You Wouldn't Answer My Calls"	2011	Hong Won-ki	
"Never Let You Go: Shindemo Hanasanai"	2012	Lee Gi-baek	
"Denwa ni Denai Kimi ni"	2012	Lee Gi-baek	
"One Day" (with 2PM)	2012	Cho Su-hyun	
"For You: Kimi no Tame ni Dekiru Koto"	2012	Cho Su-hyun	
"Darenimo Watasenai Yo"	2012	Cho Su-hyun	
"One Spring Day"	2013	Unknown	
"Bye Bye"	2014	Igarashi Taku	
