= Lee Chang-min (singer) =

South Korean singer

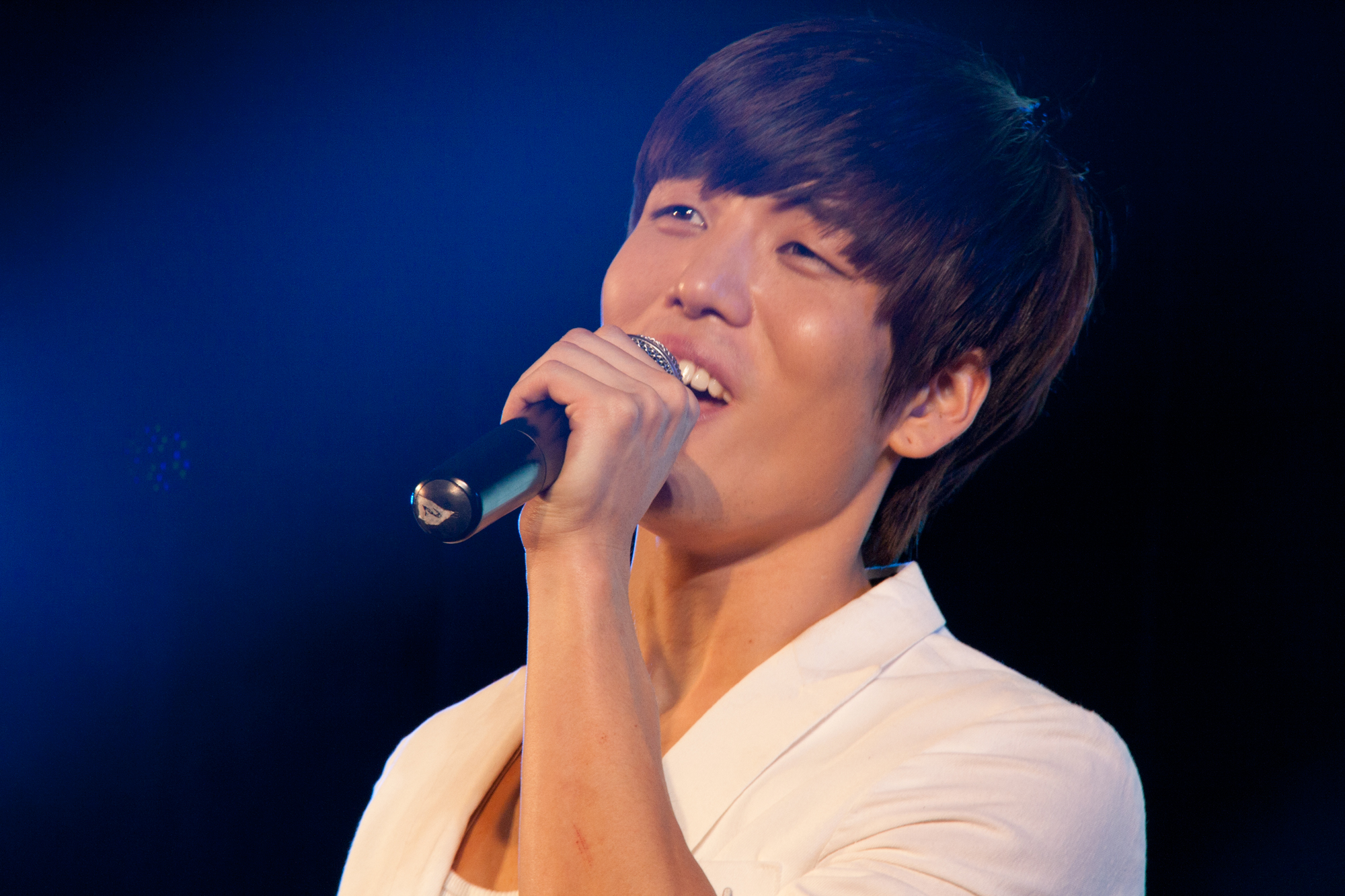
- Lee in 2011
- Born: May 1, 1986 (age 40); Busan, South Korea
- Occupations: Singer; actor
- Musical career
- Genres: K-pop; R&B
- Instrument: Vocals
- Years active: 2008–present
- Labels: Big Hit; JYP
- Member of: 2AM
- Formerly of: Homme

Korean name
- Hangul: 이창민
- RR: I Changmin
- MR: I Ch'angmin

Lee Chang-min (Korean: 이창민; born May 1, 1986), most often credited as Changmin, is a South Korean singer. He studied at Dong-ah Institute of Media and Arts and is the oldest member of the K-pop group 2AM. He was also a member of duo Homme, along with Lee Hyun.

== Discography ==
=== Extended plays ===
Title	Album details	Peak chart positions	Sales
Title	Album details	KOR	Sales
The Bright Sky	Released: April 11, 2018; Label: The Bsky; Format: CD, digital download	40	KOR: 931+

=== Singles ===
Title	Year	Peak chart positions	Sales	Album
Title	Year	KOR	Sales	Album
As lead artist
"Meet, Taste, Right?!" (만나 맛나 맞나?!)	2013	74	—N/a	Kimpira Project Part 1
Collaborations
"Graduation" (졸업) with Jo Kwon	2009	No data		Non-album singles
"Please Don't Go" (가면 안돼) with San E & Outsider	2011	14	KOR: 407,462+	Non-album singles
"The Very Last First" (마지막 처음) with Melody Day	2014	47	KOR: 91,426+	Non-album singles
"Easy to Say" (말은 쉽지)	2019			
As featured artist
"Superman" Mario feat. Changmin	2008	No data		Non-album single

=== Soundtrack appearances ===
Title	Year	Peak chart positions	Album
Title	Year	KOR	Album
"Don't Swallow" (삼키지마)	2009	No data	A Dream Comes True OST
"Can't I Love You" (사랑하면 안될까) with Jinwoon	2011	5	Dream High OST
"Road of Tears" (눈물길) with Im Seulong	2012	52	Dr. Jin OST
"I Only See One Person" (한 사람만 보여요) with Dahee of Glam	2013	36	You Are the Best! OST
"Moment"	2013	7	The Heirs OST
"Saying I Love You" (사랑한단 말) with Jinwoon	2014	37	Hotel King OST
"Hope" (바래)	2014	—	Jang Bo-ri is Here! OST
"Mirage" (신기루)	2015	—	Super Daddy Yeol OST
"That Light Trails" (그 빛을 따라서) with Lisa	2016	—	Musical Turnadot OST
"Only I Can" (오직 나만이) with Lisa, Lee Jung Hwa, Oh Sang Won	2016	—	Musical Turnadot OST
"My Name That Cannot Be Sung" (부를 수 없는 나의 이름)	2016	—	Musical Turnadot OST
"Stand By Me" (있어줘)	2018	—	Just Between Lovers OST
"—" denotes release did not chart

== Filmography ==
=== Television ===
Year	Title	Network	Notes
2009	Star Golden Bell	KBS	15.8.2009–8.5.2010
2010	Superstar K2	Mnet	Mentors with JeA & Supreme Team
2011	Food Essay	Olive TV	Host
2011	Immortal Songs 2	KBS2	Contestant
2012	I Am Changmin	Dokyo MX TV	Host
2013	God of Food Road	Y-Star	MC with Park Ji-yoon & Jeong Jun-ha (30.3.2013–22.3.2014)
2014	KBS Fly Top Striker Season 6 / Fly Shootdori 6	KBS N Sports	Coach
2014	Immortal Songs 2	KBS2	Contestant
2014	The Choice of 100 People - The Best Ramen	MBC Every1	MC
2014	Law of the Jungle - Costa Rica	SBS	
2015	Masked Singer	MBC	Contestant
2015	Immortal Songs 2	KBS2	Contestant
2015	Heir	KBS2	Road MC
2015	My Pet Consulting	Sky Petpark myPet TV	MC
2016	Duet Song Festival	MBC	Contestant
2016	Girl Spirit	KBS2	Contestant

=== Musical theatre ===
Year	Title	Role	Notes
2012	La Cage Aux Folles	Jean-Michel	Lead role
2013	Three Musketeers	D’Artagnan	Lead role
2013	Friends	Lee Joon Seok	Lead role
2014	Caffeine	Kang Ji Min	
2015	Audition	Byeong Tae	Lead role
2015	Turandot	Calaf	9th Daegu International Musical Festival
2015	Gorae Gorae	Byung Tae, the band's bassist	Kim Soo Ro's Project
2016	Romantic Muscle	Do Jae Ki	Lead role
2023	Secretly, Greatly: The Last	Lee Hae-rang	

=== Radio ===
Year	Title	Channel	Note
2015	Changmin's Music Plaza	KBS Cool FM	DJ (Sat & Sun)

== Awards and nominations ==
Year	Award	Category	Nominated work	Result
2010	Melon Music Awards	Song of the Year	"I Was Able to Eat Well" (with Lee Hyun)	Nominated
2010	Mnet Asian Music Awards	Best Collaboration	"I Was Able to Eat Well" (with Lee Hyun)	Nominated
2010	Bugs Music Awards	Best Duet	"I Was Able to Eat Well" (with Lee Hyun)	Nominated
2014	50th Baeksang Arts Awards	Best OST	"Moment"	Nominated
2014	2nd Asia Rainbow TV Awards	Outstanding Theme Song	"Moment"	Won
2014	16th Seoul International Youth Film Festival	Best OST by a Male Artist	"Moment"	Nominated
2014	16th Seoul International Youth Film Festival	Best OST by a Male Artist	"Telling You That I Love You" (with Jeong Jinwoon)	Nominated

== Personal life ==
Lee is a devout Roman Catholic.
