= Can't Let You Go Even If I Die =

Extended play recording by 2AM

EP by 2AM
- Released: January 21, 2010 (South Korea)
- Recorded: 2010
- Genre: K-pop
- Length: 17:48
- Label: Big Hit Entertainment

2AM chronology
| Time For Confession (2009) | Can't Let You Go Even If I Die (2010) | Saint o'Clock (2010) |

Repackaged edition cover

Singles from Can't Let You Go Even If I Die
- 1. "Can't Let You Go Even If I Die" Released: January 21, 2010

Singles from I Was Wrong
- 1. "I Was Wrong" Released: March 16, 2010

Can't Let You Go Even If I Die (Korean: 죽어도 못 보내; RR: Jugeodo mot bonae) is the debut extended play by South Korean boy band 2AM. The title track "Can't Let You Go Even If I Die" was released as a single. It was the most downloaded song of 2010 in South Korea, with 3,352,827 downloads.

A repackaged 11-track version renamed I Was Wrong was released as the group's first studio album. It contained all six tracks of the mini album Can't Let You Go Even If I Die with five additional tracks not found on the original mini-album. The title track "I Was Wrong" was released on March 16, 2010, as a single.

== History ==
As opposed to their previous songs, the tracks on the mini-album were not written by Park Jin-young, but by Big Hit Entertainment founder and Park's long-time songwriting partner Bang Si-hyuk, who is famous for composing Baek Ji-young's "총 맞은 것처럼" ("Like Being Hit By a Bullet") and 8Eight's "심장이 없어" ("Without a Heart"). Although set to be released on January 26, 2010, the mini-album was unexpectedly delayed and instead released 2 days later.

== Music video ==
In the week before the song's official release, four teaser videos of each member were released on 2AM's official YouTube channel, each depicting a different season. The only full music video was released on February 20, 2010.

== Promotion ==
The song quickly topped the online music charts after its release, beating Girls' Generation's "Oh!" and CNBLUE's "I'm A Loner". 2AM made their comeback stage on "Inkigayo" on January 24, 2010.

On February 7, 2010, 2AM won their first Mutizen award on "Inkigayo" since their debut. On February 25, 2010, their second win was on Mnet M!Countdown. They won a second Mutizen on their final day of promotions on March 7, 2010.

== Accolades ==
Awards for "Can't Let You Go Even If I Die"
| Year | Organization | Award | Result | Ref. |
|---|---|---|---|---|
| 2010 | Cyworld Digital Music Awards | Song of the Year | Won | |
| 2010 | Cyworld Digital Music Awards | Song of the Month (February) | Won | |
| 2010 | Golden Disc Awards | Digital Daesang | Won | |
| 2010 | Golden Disc Awards | Digital Bonsang | Won | |
| 2010 | Melon Music Awards | Song of the Year | Won | |
| 2010 | Mnet Asian Music Awards | Song of the Year | Nominated | |
| 2010 | Mnet Asian Music Awards | Best Vocal Performance – Group | Won | |
| 2010 | Mnet Asian Music Awards | Best Male Group | Nominated | |
| 2011 | Seoul Music Awards | R&B Ballad Award | Won | |

Music program awards
| Song | Program | Date | Ref. |
|---|---|---|---|
| "Can't Let You Go Even If I Die" | SBS's Inkigayo | February 7, 2010 | |
| "Can't Let You Go Even If I Die" | SBS's Inkigayo | March 7, 2010 | |
| "Can't Let You Go Even If I Die" | Mnet's M Countdown | February 25, 2010 | |

== Track listing ==
Can't Let You Go Even If I Die track listing
| No. | Title | Length |
|---|---|---|
| 1. | "Prologue" | 2:52 |
| 2. | "Can't Let You Go Even If I Die" (죽어도 못 보내; Jugeodo Mot Bonae) | 3:17 |
| 3. | "I'm Sorry I Can't Laugh for You" (웃어 줄 수가 없어서 미안하다; Useo Jul Suga Obseoseo Mianhada) | 3:06 |
| 4. | "I Love You" (feat. Baek Chan and Joo Hee of 8eight) | 3:34 |
| 5. | "To Her" (그녀에게; Geunyeoege) (feat. Chansung of 2PM) | 3:52 |
| 6. | "Laughing" (웃는다; Usneunda) (Outro) | 1:10 |
| Total length: | | 17:48 |

I Was Wrong track listing
| No. | Title | Length |
|---|---|---|
| 1. | "Prologue" | 2:52 |
| 2. | "I Was Wrong" (잘못했어; Jalmot Haesseo) | 3:53 |
| 3. | "What Do I Do?" (어떡하죠; Eotteokhajyo) | 3:46 |
| 4. | "Not Because" (아니라기에; Aniragie) | 3:49 |
| 5. | "Although You've Turned Around Now" (일단 돌아서지만; Ildan Doraseojiman) | 3:44 |
| 6. | "Lost" | 3:40 |
| 7. | "Can't Let You Go Even If I Die" (죽어도 못 보내; Jugeodo Mot Bonae) | 3:17 |
| 8. | "I'm Sorry I Can't Laugh for You" (웃어 줄 수가 없어서 미안하다; Useo Jul Suga Obseoseo Mianhada) | 3:06 |
| 9. | "I Love You" (feat. Baek Chan and Joo Hee of 8eight) | 3:34 |
| 10. | "To Her" (그녀에게; Geunyeoege) (feat. Chansung of 2PM) | 3:52 |
| 11. | "Laughing" (웃는다; Usneunda) (Outro) | 1:10 |
| Total length: | | 36:36 |

- On the re-release album I Was Wrong, all tracks from "Can't Let You Go Even If I Die" were listed as tracks 7 to 11, only "Prologue" stayed as the track 1.

== Charts ==
=== Album chart ===
Can't Let You Go Even If I Die

| Chart | Peak position |
|---|---|
| Gaon Weekly album chart | 2 |
| Gaon Weekly domestic album chart | 2 |
| Gaon Yearly album chart | 21 |

I Was Wrong

| Chart | Peak position |
|---|---|
| Gaon Weekly album chart | 1 |
| Gaon Weekly domestic album chart | 1 |
| Gaon Yearly album chart | 38 |

=== Single chart ===
| Song | Peak position |
| Song | KOR |
| Song | Gaon Chart |
|---|---|
| "Can't Let You Go Even If I Die" | 1 |
| "I Was Wrong" | 2 |

== See also ==
- List of best-selling singles in South Korea
