= Jeong Jin-woon =

South Korean singer and actor

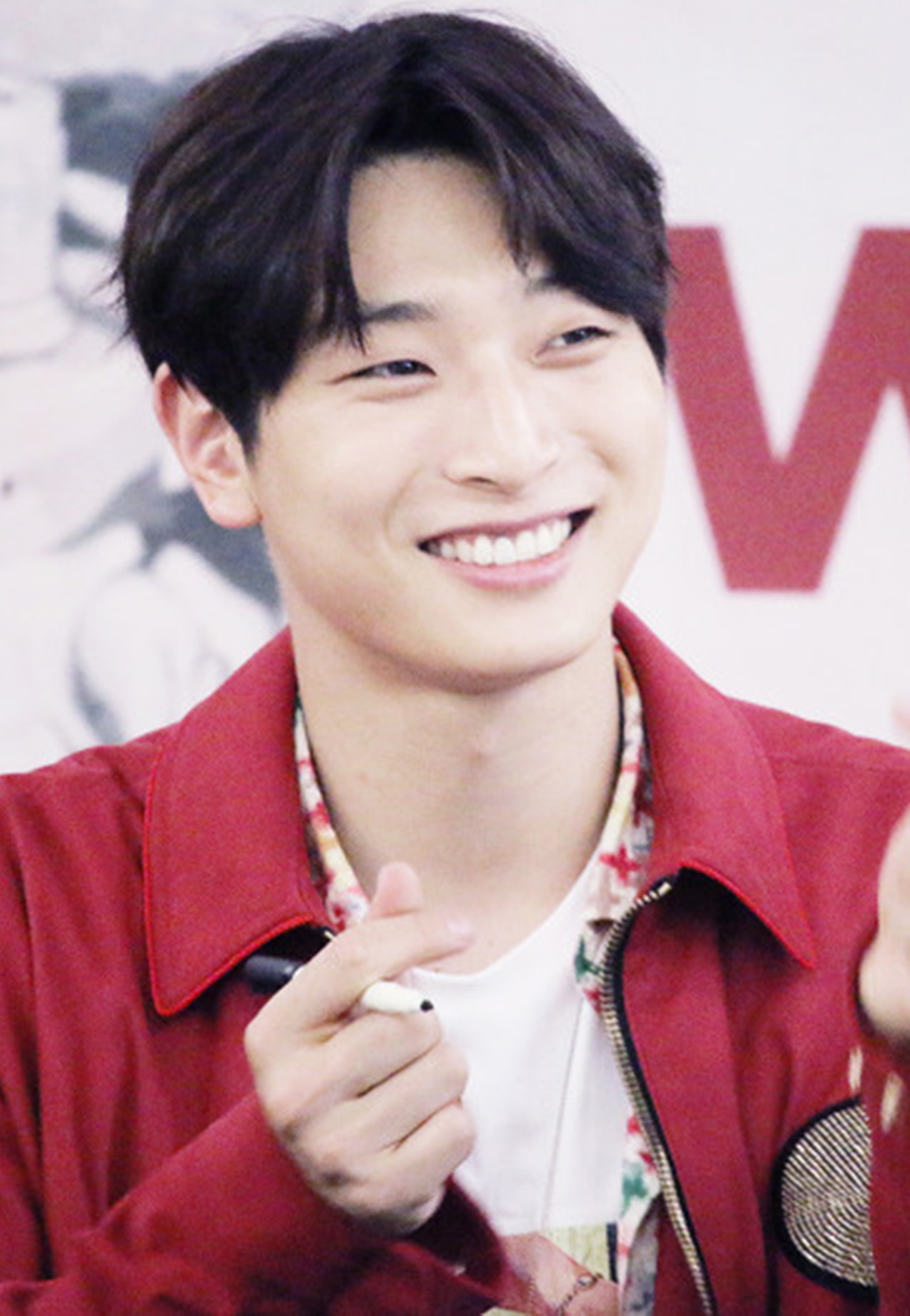
- Jeong in June 2016
- Born: May 2, 1991 (age 35); Seoul, South Korea
- Other name: Jung Jin-woon
- Occupations: Singer; actor
- Musical career
- Genres: K-pop
- Instruments: Vocals
- Years active: 2007–present
- Labels: Big Hit; JYP; Mystic Story
- Member of: 2AM

- Korean name
- Hangul: 정진운
- Hanja: 鄭珍雲
- RR: Jeong Jinun
- MR: Chŏng Chinun

Jeong Jin-woon (Korean: 정진운), most often credited as Jinwoon, is a South Korean singer and actor. Debuting as a member of the group 2AM in July 2008, he began his acting career in 2012 with the KBS series Dream High 2, playing Jin Yoo-jin.

== Biography ==
Jinwoon was born on May 2, 1991 in Seoul, South Korea. He graduated high school from BaekAhm High School. He, along with Shinee's Onew and Girls' Generation's Seohyun, had the highest national score for their high school SATs exam. He studied at Daejin University, Dept. of Theatre and Visual Arts, the same class as fellow group member, Seulong. Jinwoon is known to be close to 91-liners, such as Nicole Jung of Kara, Son Dong-woon of Beast, Mir of MBLAQ, Key of Shinee, and Seohyun of Girls' Generation. On October 7, 2013, Jinwoon, along with his manager and staff, were involved in a car accident in which he fractured his right ankle.

His cousin, Park Mi-so, was a member of a South Korean Kpop girl group Tahiti.

== Career ==
=== 2AM ===
He was originally eliminated from 2AM in the Hot Blood documentary, but Jinwoon eventually returned after one of the chosen members Daehun had to return to the States for personal reasons. Prior to debut, he was in a band called No Comment. He plays guitar, drums, bass guitar, bongo, and piano.

=== Solo promotions ===
Jinwoon debuted as a solo artist on July 31, 2011, at the Jisan Valley Rock Festival, where he performed his first solo single "You Walking Toward Me" written and composed by him. The limited single (1,000 copies) went on sale on August 4. Included on the single was an additional song, "Lalala," also composed by Jinwoon. On August 7, the music video for the song "You Walking Toward Me" was released by Big Hit Entertainment.

This was followed by another two-single mini-album, which includes the songs "Now or Never" and "Psycho", also written by Jinwoon. On November 8, Jinwoon enabled his song "Psycho" to be downloaded for free. The album and music video were released on November 17.

On November 25, he held his first solo concert at Hongdae V Hall in Seoul. To help establish his 'rocker roots', he received mentorship from veteran rock band YB, vocalist Yoon Do Hyun, and bassist Park Tae Hee. Big Hit Entertainment revealed on November 15, "Jinwoon successfully completed a joint production with Yoon Do Hyun's Band, who he's admired for a long time. Through his concert, Jinwoon will be deviating from his 2AM image to show a new "rocker" side to his personality."

On February 29, 2012, he released the OST song "We Are The B" for KBS's Dream High 2 together with Kang So-ra, Jinyoung and Kim Ji Soo.

He was then featured in his friend Nicole Jung's solo track "Lost" in Kara Collection, both in Korean and Japanese.

=== Acting ===
In 2009, he made an appearance on the television series Family Needed.

He was a rotating host for Mnet's M Countdown along with his bandmate Jo Kwon in 2010.

He was cast for KBS's drama Dream High Season 2 in 2012 as one of the main character Jin Yoojin, who dreams of becoming a rock star that attends Kirin Art School.

Jinwoon was paired with Go Joon-hee in the fourth season of We Got Married in 2013. Jinwoon became a co-host of Music Bank with Park Se-young on April 12, 2013. On October 6, Jinwoon was injured in a car accident. He promoted Park Seo-joon to replace him as co-host.

He was cast as Han Yeo Reum in TVN's drama Marriage Over Dating in 2014.

He played Choi Seung-chan, a former rookie rising baseball star, in the South Korean television series called Madame Antoine: The Love Therapist, which was released in January 2016.

== Discography ==
=== Single albums ===
Title	Album details	Peak chart positions	Sales
Title	Album details	KOR	Sales
You Walking Toward Me (걸어온다)	Released: August 1, 2011; Label: Big Hit Entertainment, JYP Entertainment; Format: CD, digital download; Track listing: 1. You Walking Toward Me (걸어온다); 2. La La La (라라라)	—	
Now or Never (지금이 아니면)	Released: November 17, 2011; Label: Big Hit Entertainment, JYP Entertainment; Format: CD, digital download; Track listing: 1. Now or Never (지금이 아니면) (feat. YB); 2. Psycho	9	KOR: 3,000
Will	Released: June 9, 2016; Label: Mystic Entertainment; Format: CD, digital download; Track listing: 1. Tricky (feat. Shin Dae-chul); 2. Will (feat. Tiger JK); 3. When the Petal Falls (꽃잎 떨어질 때) (feat. Jo Hyun Ah of Urban Zakapa)	17	KOR: 1,164
Koong! Pop!	Released: September 2, 2018; Label: Mystic Entertainment; Format: digital download; Track listing: 1. Oh, My Head (머리만 아파); 2. All I Need Is You; 3. Shine	—	
"—" denotes releases that did not chart.

=== Singles ===
Title	Year	Peak chart positions		Sales	Album
Title	Year	KOR	JPN	Sales	Album
Korean
"You Walking Toward Me" (걸어온다)	2011	37	—	KOR: 203,987	You Walking Toward Me
"Now or Never" (지금이 아니면) (feat. YB)	2011	62	—	KOR: 225,464	Now or Never
"Yesterday" (with L.Joe, Gikwang, Lee Joon & Hoya)	2012	9	—	KOR: 180,505	The Color Of K-Pop
"Will" (feat. Tiger JK)	2016	—	—		Will
"Set Me Free" (with Hanbin Chyung)	2017	—	—		Non-album singles
"Love is True"	2017	—	—		Non-album singles
"White Christmas" (with Gyeongree)	2017	—	—		Non-album singles
"Erasing" (널 잊고 봄)	2018	—	—		Non-album singles
"All I Need Is You"	2018	—	—		Koong! Pop!
"I'm glad"	2021	—	—		Thumping Broadcasting Accident OST
Japanese
"Will" (Japanese ver.)	2016	—	31	JPN: 1,966	Will (Japanese ver.)
"—" denotes releases that did not chart.

=== Soundtrack appearances ===
Title	Year	Peak chart positions	Sales	Album
Title	Year	KOR	Sales	Album
"Can't I Love You" (사랑하면 안될까) (with Lee Chang-min)	2011	7	KOR: 221,407	Dream High OST
"We Are The B" (B급 인생) (with Kang So-ra, Park Jin-young & Kim Ji-soo)	2012	13	KOR: 631,490	Dream High 2 OST
"Saying I Love You" (사랑한단 말) (with Lee Chang-min)	2014	37	KOR: 85,717	Hotel King OST

== Filmography ==
=== Film ===
Year	Title	Role	Notes	Ref.
2021	Only I Can See	Jang Geun		
2021	Brother	Kang soo		
2022	Oh! My Ghost	Studio FD Taemin		
2022	Lovely Voice: The Beginning	Kei		
2023	Rebound	Bae Gyu-hyuk		
2023	I'm Here	Kyu-jong		
2025	Choir of God	Captain Kim		

=== Television series ===
Year	Title	Role	Notes	Ref.
2011	Dream High	flash mob dancer	Cameo (Episode 16)	
2012	Dream High 2	Jin Yu-jin		
2013	Family	Kang Dong-won	Cameo	
2014	Marriage, Not Dating	Han Yeo-reum		
2016	Madame Antoine: The Love Therapist	Choi Seung-chan		
2018	Let Me Introduce Her	Lee Hee-yeong		
2018	Still 17	Jung Jin-woon	Cameo (Episode 24)	
2021	So Not Worth It	Carson's boyfriend	Cameo (Episode 6–7)	
2021	Friendly Police	Kim Soon-kyung	Midnight Thriller	

=== Television shows ===
Year	Title	Role	Notes	Ref.
2010	M Countdown	Rotating host	with Nichkhun, Lee Jun-ho, Hwang Chan-sung, Jo Kwon, Kang Min-hyuk, Lee Joon, and G.O	
2012	Law of the Jungle	Himself	Madagascar	
2013	We Got Married Season 4	Main cast	with Go Joon-hee	
2013	Music Bank	Host	with Park Se-young	
2015	Law of the Jungle	Himself	Yap Island, Hidden Kingdom (Brunei)	
2017	Law of the Jungle	Himself	Fiji, Pacific Ocean	
2016	King of Mask Singer	Contestant	As "One Wins Plus Singer King Minus" episode 73	
2022	Style Me	Host	Season 3	

=== Web shows ===
Year	Title	Role	Notes	Ref.
2022	#Romantic City	Cast Member	in Hua Hin, Thailand	

=== Music video appearances ===
Year	Song title	Artist
2011	"You, Walking Towards Me"	Himself
2011	"Now or Never"	Himself
2014	"Oppa, You're Mine"	Tahiti

== Awards and nominations ==
Year	Award	Category	Nominee / Work	Result	Ref.
2014	16th Seoul International Youth Film Festival	Best Young Actor	Marriage, Not Dating	Nominated	
2014	16th Seoul International Youth Film Festival	Best OST by a Male Artist (with Lee Changmin)	Saying I Love You	Nominated	
2015	SBS Entertainment Awards	Best Challenger Award	Law of the Jungle	Won	
2018	13th Asia Model Awards	Fashionsta Award	Jeong Jin-woon	Won	
