= Must (album) =

Studio album by 2PM
- Released: June 28, 2021
- Studios: JYPE, Seoul, South Korea
- Genres: K-pop; Contemporary R&B
- Length: 31:07
- Language: Korean
- Labels: JYP; Dreamus

2PM chronology
The Best of 2PM in Japan 2011–2016 (2020)	Must (2021)	With Me Again (2021)

Singles from Must
- 1. "Make It" Released: June 28, 2021

Must (stylized in all caps) is the seventh Korean studio album by South Korean boy band 2PM. The album was released on June 28, 2021. It was the group's first release in almost five years, since all of the group's members were discharged from their mandatory military service.

== Background and release ==
It was announced in January 2021 that 2PM would make a full group comeback later in the year after Junho completed his military service. On March 20, 2021, Junho became the final 2PM member to be discharged. On the same day, South Korean news outlet Ilgan Sports reported that the group's comeback was scheduled for the summer. JYP Entertainment confirmed that 2PM was working on a new album while noting that “the exact timing of the release will be announced later on."

On June 7, 2021, JYP Entertainment posted a video titled "The Hottest Origins" on its official social media channels, announcing the release date and the title of 2PM's seventh Korean studio album, their first in almost five years since Gentlemen's Game, Must. Between June 16 to June 21, concept photos of each member was posted on 2PM's social media, and on June 23, group teaser photos were released. A highlight medley produced by 2PM member Chansung showing excerpts of each track in the album was released on YouTube on June 24. On June 28, 2021, 2PM released both Must and the music video for the album's lead single, "Make It".

On July 13, 2021, a music video for the B-side track "The Cafe" was released, with a brighter and more innocent tone than "Make It". On August 3, 2021, a music video for the B-side track "Hold You" was released, dedicated to the group's fans and featuring behind-the-scenes footage of the group preparing for their comeback.

On May 23, 2022, JYP Entertainment released a limited edition LP record version of Must.

== Composition ==
During the group's hiatus, "My House", the title track of the group's 2015 album No.5, climbed back to the top spots of multiple music streaming charts. The members said that the success of the song impacted the production of Must. The album's ten tracks, seven of which were written by 2PM members, primarily borrow elements from jazz and pop while maintaining 2PM's signature sweltering electronic sound. The tracks "Moon & Back" and "The Cafe", on the other hand, utilize a pulsating 808 drumming for a familiar R&B inflection. The album's lead track, "Make It", is a pop song with jazz and soul elements written and composed by member Wooyoung.

Professional ratings
Review scores
Source	Rating
NME	4/5 stars
IZM	2/5 stars

== Promotion ==
In the lead up to the album's release, 2PM began uploading a new web series of group content titled Wild Six on their YouTube channel. They also made a group appearance on the web series MMTG, where they performed as a full group for the first time since their hiatus.

2PM hosted a TV comeback special of the same name, premiering globally on the cable channel Mnet and the digital channel M2 an hour after the album's release. During the show, 2PM performed songs from Must for the first time, as well as several of their older lead singles such as "Hands Up", "A.D.T.O.Y.", and "My House".

For two weeks, 2PM performed the tracks "Make It" and "OK or Not" on TV music programs to promote the album, starting with M Countdown on July 1, 2021. 2PM members also made individual and group appearances on Korean variety shows, such as The Return of Superman and Knowing Bros, and radio shows, such as Melon Station's Today Music, in promotion of the album. The group ended promotions for the album with a special live broadcast on Naver Now on July 11, 2021, titled "The Cafe in Front of My House Tonight" (Korean: 오늘 저녁 집 앞 카페; RR: Oneul jeonyeok jip ap kape) after the track "The Cafe".

== Track listing ==
All editions track listing
No.	Title	Lyrics	Music	Arrangement	Length
1.	"Intro."		HotSauce	HotSauce	1:00
2.	"Make It" (Korean: 해야 해; RR: Haeya hae; lit. 'Must')	Wooyoung; HotSauce	Wooyoung; HotSauce	HotSauce	2:59
3.	"OK or Not" (Korean: 괜찮아 안 괜찮아; RR: Gwaenchana an gwaenchana)	Jun. K; Lee Hae Sol	Jun. K; Lee	Lee	3:28
4.	"On My Way" (Korean: 보고싶어, 보러갈게; RR: Bogosipeo, boreogalge; lit. 'I Miss You, I'll Come See You')	Jun. K; Lee	Jun. K; Lee	Lee	3:01
5.	"Champagne" (Korean: 샴페인; RR: Syampein)	Taecyeon; Raphael	Taecyeon; Raphael	Raphael	3:05
6.	"The Cafe" (Korean: 집 앞 카페; RR: Jip ap kape; lit. 'Cafe in Front of My House')	Wooyoung	Toyo; Sean Michael Alexander; Sqvare	Toyo	3:40
7.	"Moon & Back"	Emily Yeonseo Kim	KT Park; Jinbyjin; Emily Yeonseo Kim	Jinbyjin	3:27
8.	"Two of Us" (Korean: 둘이; RR: Duri)	Kim Won	Kim Won; Yoo Young Ho	Yoo Young Ho	3:11
9.	"Hold You" (Korean: 놓지 않을게; RR: Nochi aneulge; lit. 'I Won't Let You Go')	Jun. K	Jun. K	Flum3n	3:56
10.	"My House" (Korean: 우리 집; RR: Uri jip; lit. 'Our House') (acoustic version)	Jun. K	Jun. K; LEL	LEL	3:20
Total length:					31:07

== Charts ==
=== Weekly charts ===
Chart performance for Must
Chart (2021)	Peak position
South Korea (Gaon)	3
Japan (Oricon)	4
Japan (Billboard Japan Hot 100)	8

=== Monthly charts ===
Chart performance for Must
Chart (2021)	Peak position
South Korean Albums (Gaon)	12

=== Year-end charts ===
Year-end chart performance for Must
Chart (2021)	Position
South Korean Albums (Gaon)	74

== Sales ==
Country	Sales
South Korea	143,480
Japan	8,187
