= With Me Again =

- Regular edition cover

EP by 2PM
- Released: September 29, 2021
- Genres: J-pop; Contemporary R&B
- Language: Japanese
- Label: Epic Records Japan

2PM chronology
Must (2021)	With Me Again (2021)

Singles from With Me Again
- 1. "With Me Again" Released: September 9, 2021

With Me Again (Japanese: 僕とまた; Boku to Mata) is the first Japanese extended play by South Korean boy band 2PM. It was released on September 29, 2021. It is the first Japanese release by 2PM since all of the group's members were discharged from their mandatory military service.

== Background and release ==
In 2017, 2PM went on hiatus as the group's members began their mandatory military services. On March 20, 2021, Junho became the final member to be discharged.

In July 2021, JYP Entertainment announced that the group will be release a mini-album titled With Me Again on September 29, their first Japanese release in five years, following their 2016 Japanese single "Promise (I'll Be)". In promotion of their new release, their Mnet comeback special Must was re-aired with Japanese subtitles on September 4, 2021.

The title track, "With Me Again", was pre-released digitally on September 9; its music video was released the day prior. "With Me Again" peaked at number 44 on the Oricon Digital Singles Chart and at number 43 on the Billboard Japan Download Songs Chart. 2PM performed the song on Japanese television programs such as Music Station on September 10, their first time on the show in 10 years, and Sukkiri on September 28, their first time on the show in 8 years.

== Composition ==
The title track, "With Me Again", written and composed by member Jun. K, is characterized by a pulsating whistling tone. He wrote the song at the beginning of the year, between January 1 and 2. The EP also includes a Japanese version of the title track of the group's Korean album Must, "Make It", as well as two more original songs written and composed by Jun. K: "By My Side" and "Urahara."

== Track listing ==
Track List
No.	Title	Lyrics	Music	Arrangements	Length
1.	"With Me Again" (僕とまた; Boku to Mata)	Jun. K, Mayu Wakisaka	Jun. K, Flum3n	Flum3n	3:47
2.	"Make It" (Japanese ver.)	Jang Wooyoung	Wooyoung, HotSauce	HotSauce	3:01
3.	"By My Side"	Sunny Boy, Albdin Norddqvist	Nordqvist, Selah	Nordqvist, Selah	4:02
4.	"Urahara"	Jun. K, Shoko Fujibayashi	Jun. K	Flum3n	4:07
5.	"With Me Again" (taalthechoi remix)	Jun. K, Wakisaka	Jun. K, Flum3n	taalthechoi	3:34
6.	"Make It" (Japanese ver., HotSauce remix)	Wooyoung	Wooyoung, HotSauce	HotSauce	3:12
7.	"My House" (Japanese ver., acoustic ver.)	Jun. K, Lel	Jun. K, Lel	Lel	3:20

== Charts ==
Chart (2021)	Peak position
Oricon Weekly Albums Chart	2
Oricon Yearly Albums Chart	83
