= A.D.T.O.Y. =

2013 single by 2PM

Single by 2PM

from the album Grown
- Released: May 11, 2013
- Recorded: 2013
- Genre: K-pop; Electropop; Contemporary R&B
- Length: 4:06
- Label: JYP
- Songwriters: Park Jin-young; Ok Taec-yeon
- Producer: Park Jin-young

2PM singles chronology
"Comeback When You Hear This Song" (2013)	"A.D.T.O.Y." (2013)	"Give Me Love" (2013)

Music video
- "A.D.T.O.Y." on YouTube

"A.D.T.O.Y." (Korean: 하.니.뿐.; RR: Ha.ni.ppun.; lit. 'Only you') is a song recorded by South Korean boy group 2PM. It is one of two title tracks for their third Korean studio album Grown, released by JYP Entertainment on May 11, 2013. Billboard placed the song at number 36 on their list of "The 100 Greatest K-pop Songs of the 2010s".

== Background ==
On April 30, 2013, JYP Entertainment revealed the title and track list of 2PM's third Korean studio album, which would feature a double title track: "Comeback When You Hear This Song" and "A.D.T.O.Y.", which stands for "All Day Think (of) Only You". The song's domestic title, "하.니.뿐.", is also an abbreviation, for the lyrics 하루 종일 니 생각뿐이야 (Haru jongil ni saenggakppuniya; 'I think about nothing but you all day long').

On May 6, 2013, 2PM released eleven of the twelve songs from their upcoming studio album Grown as a digital pre-release. On May 11, the twelfth song, "A.D.T.O.Y.", was released as a digital single along with its music video, followed by the group's first performance of the song on a comeback special aired on MBC titled 2PM Returns on May 12 at 00:30 KST.

== Composition ==
"A.D.T.O.Y" was written and composed by JYP Entertainment founder Park Jin-young, with the rap section co-written by 2PM member Taecyeon. The song is composed in the key B major at a rate of 148 beats per minute and a running time of 4 minutes and 6 seconds. "A.D.T.O.Y." is an electropop and contemporary R&B track that mixes repetitive violin, drums, and bass instrumentation with electronic dubstep sounds and layered breathy vocals. The lyrics of the song are about the intense intimate feelings of a man in love.

== Music video ==
The music video for "A.D.T.O.Y.", starring actress Lee Seul-ah, was released on May 11, 2013. The music video is filmed in black-and-white and features a choreography using chairs and incorporating sensual hip and pelvic movements. It received attention for what was described as "R-rated" scenes involving the members shirtless and being intimate with the actress in various set locations such as in bed, in a car, and in a bathroom. JYP Entertainment stated that more explicit scenes were removed during the editing process of the music video in order for it to receive a 15+ rating instead of a 19+ rating by the Korea Media Rating Board.

== Promotion ==
2PM first performed "A.D.T.O.Y." on their comeback special, 2PM Returns, aired on MBC on May 12, 2013. On May 16, 2013, 2PM held their first comeback stage for the song on Mnet's M Countdown; they went on to promote the song on Korean music programs for five weeks. They also performed the song on TV shows such as You Hee-yeol's Sketchbook and the third season of the South Korean edition of Dancing with the Stars.

Following the resurgence in popularity of 2PM's 2015 title track "My House" in 2020, "A.D.T.O.Y." also saw a smaller increase in attention. As a result, when promoting their comeback album Must in 2021 after a four-year hiatus due to mandatory military service, 2PM also performed "A.D.T.O.Y." on their Mnet comeback show special Must on June 28 and on MBC's Show! Music Core on July 3.

== Reception ==
Although the song initially topped various domestic music charts such as Bugs! and Soribada upon release, both it and "Comeback When You Hear This Song" failed to meet expectations in South Korea, with little staying power on charts. Critics attributed to this to timing, being released at the same time as many other major artists' new releases, as well as the group's lack of high-profile activities domestically in the past two years. However, "A.D.T.O.Y." peaked higher and charted longer on the American Billboard's World Digital Songs chart than the domestic Gaon Digital Chart. Furthermore, in the same year of the song's release, Billboard listed the song as number 13 on their list of the "20 Best K-pop Songs of 2013: K-Town Picks", describing it as a song "Usher would kill for".

In a retrospective article, Billboard praised the "emotional intensity" of the song, which had a unique "sexy concept" at a time when the concept was generally deemed as a girl group concept in South Korea. A 2021 GQ Korea article similarly praised performances of the song for showing a "more mature side of 2PM" while still captivating fans with simple choreography. In 2018, as part of the 10th anniversary since 2PM's debut, Japanese fans voted "A.D.T.O.Y." as the group's third "best sexy song", earning it a place in the digital compilation album 2PM Awards Selection.

"A.D.T.O.Y." on critic lists
Publication	Year	List	Rank	Ref.
Billboard	2013	20 Best K-pop Songs of 2013: K-Town Picks	13	
Billboard	2019	The 100 Greatest K-pop Songs of the 2010s	36	

== Charts ==
=== Weekly charts ===
Chart (2013)	Peak position
South Korea (Gaon)	16
South Korea (Gaon Streaming Singles Chart)	33
South Korea (Gaon Download Singles Chart)	9
South Korea (Gaon BGM Chart)	14
South Korea (Gaon Mobile Ringtone Chart)	41
South Korea (K-pop Hot 100)	21
US World Digital Songs (Billboard)	5

=== Monthly charts ===
Chart (May 2013)	Peak position
South Korea (Gaon)	37

== Sales ==
Country	Sales
South Korea (digital)	398,084

== Release history ==
Release history for "A.D.T.O.Y."
Region	Date	Format	Label
Various	May 11, 2013	Digital download	JYP
