= 2PM =

South Korean boy band

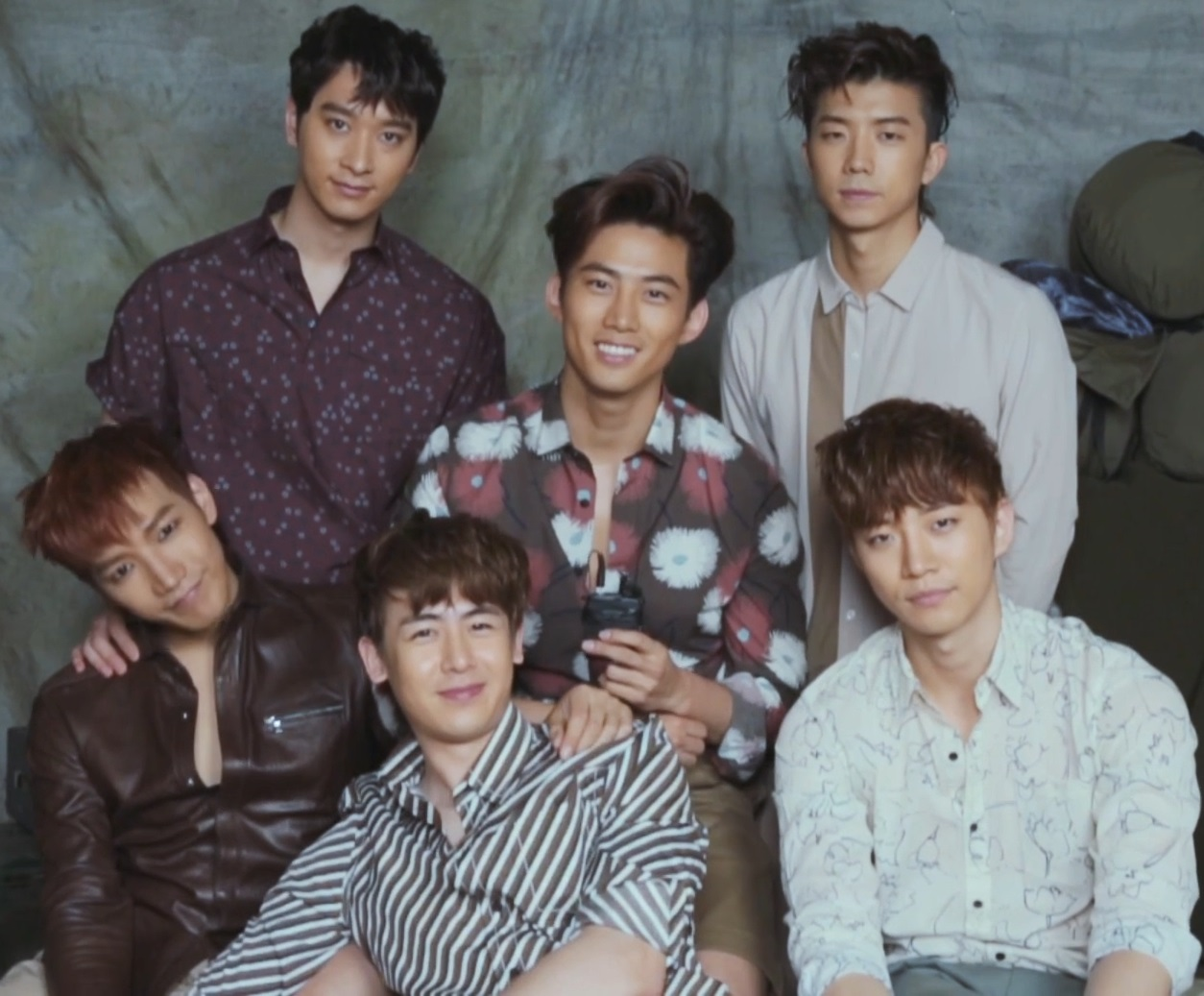
- 2PM in 2015; Clockwise from top to bottom: Chansung, Taecyeon, Wooyoung, Junho, Nichkhun, and Jun. K

Background information
- Origin: Seoul, South Korea
- Genres: K-pop; J-pop; R&B; hip-hop; electronic
- Works: 2PM discography
- Years active: 2008–2017; 2021–present
- Labels: JYP; Sony Music Japan; Ariola Japan; United Asia Management
- Member of: JYP Nation
- Spinoff of: One Day
- Members: Jun. K; Nichkhun; Taecyeon; Wooyoung; Junho; Chansung
- Past members: Jaebeom
- Website: 2pm.jype.com (Korea); 2pmjapan.com (Japan)

2PM (Korean: 투피엠) is a South Korean boy band formed by JYP Entertainment in 2008 composed of six members: Jun. K (formerly known as Junsu), Nichkhun, Taecyeon, Wooyoung, Junho, and Chansung. 2PM was originally a seven-piece group; Jaebeom left the band in 2009. Unlike most Korean boy bands at the time, 2PM constructed a tough and masculine image through their intense performances often featuring acrobatic stunts and sex appeal. As a result, 2PM is known for creating the "beast idol" (Korean: 짐승돌; RR: jimseungdol) phenomenon within South Korea. As the group grew older, they stopped incorporating acrobatics in their choreography routines and transitioned into a more gentlemanly image. The group has achieved commercial success in several regions in Asia, including South Korea, Japan, and Thailand, as a leading figure of the Korean Wave.

2PM debuted with the song "10 Out of 10" on September 4, 2008. They achieved their first number-one single with "Again & Again" in 2009, which contributed to them winning the 2009 MAMA Award for Artist of the Year. Both singles, along with their hit song "Heartbeat", were featured on their debut studio album, 01:59PM (2009), which topped the first issue of the Gaon Album Chart. From 2010 to 2011, they cemented their popularity across Asia with their streak of hit songs: "Without U", "I'll Be Back", and "Hands Up", all of which were included in their second studio album, Hands Up (2011).

2PM ventured into the Japanese music scene in 2011 with their debut Japanese single "Take Off" and their debut Japanese studio album, Republic of 2PM. As the group began writing and producing more of their own music, they enjoyed significant commercial success in South Korea with their subsequent albums: Grown (2013), Go Crazy! (2014), No.5 (2015), and Gentlemen's Game (2016), each of which peaked within the top 3 on the Gaon Album Chart. 2PM achieved even greater success in Japan, with their albums Legend of 2PM (2013), Genesis of 2PM (2014), 2PM of 2PM (2015), and Galaxy of 2PM (2016) all topping the Oricon Albums Chart. Furthermore, out of their eleven Japanese singles, nine have been certified Gold by the Recording Industry Association of Japan (RIAJ) for selling over 100,000 copies; Galaxy of 2PM also has received this certification.

The group took an official hiatus in 2017 due to mandatory military service. Following the members' discharge, 2PM returned with their seventh Korean studio album Must and Japanese EP With Me Again in 2021.

== History ==
=== Pre-debut ===
The members of 2PM all auditioned to join JYP Entertainment, with the exception of Thai-American member Nichkhun, who was scouted as a high school senior in the United States, became the company's first non-ethnic Korean trainee in 2006, and eventually became the first Thai idol in the Korean entertainment industry upon debut. Jaebeom and Jun. K were chosen from auditions in 2004, and Wooyoung was chosen after placing first in JYP Entertainment's first open audition in 2007. Taecyeon, Junho and Chansung had participated in JYP Entertainment's 2006 audition TV program Superstar Survival; Junho finished as the winner, while Taecyeon and Chansung were given trainee contracts despite being eliminated. Three of the members had previously lived in the United States: Jaebeom in the Seattle area, Nichkhun in Southern California, and Taecyeon in Massachusetts.

Originally, the members of 2PM were part of a larger group known as One Day. In early 2008, a reality TV series on Mnet called Hot Blooded Men captured the group's training days and had viewers vote on which trainees would debut. Former member Jaebeom received the most fan votes, finishing in the top spot, while three trainees were eliminated: Lee Swichi, Jeong Jin-woon, and Yoon Doo-joon. However, Jeong would later replace Im Daehun upon the latter's withdrawal. By the end of the training process, One Day had been reduced to an eleven-member group. The band was then split into four-member ballad group 2AM and seven-member dance-focused group 2PM. Jaebeom was chosen to serve as 2PM's leader, as the oldest and most well-rounded member.

=== 2008–2010: Debut, early success, and Jaebeom's departure ===
2PM debuted with their single album Hottest Time of the Day on August 29, 2008. The album consisted a total of 6 tracks, including its hip-hop title track "10 Out of 10". The group made their debut live performance on September 4, 2008 with "10 Out of 10" on M Countdown, drawing attention for their choreography which uniquely featured acrobatics and breakdancing. In December 2008, the group released a winter special version of their song "Only You", a B-side from their debut mini-album. Concurrently, 2PM hosted the third season of the Korean variety show Idol Show.

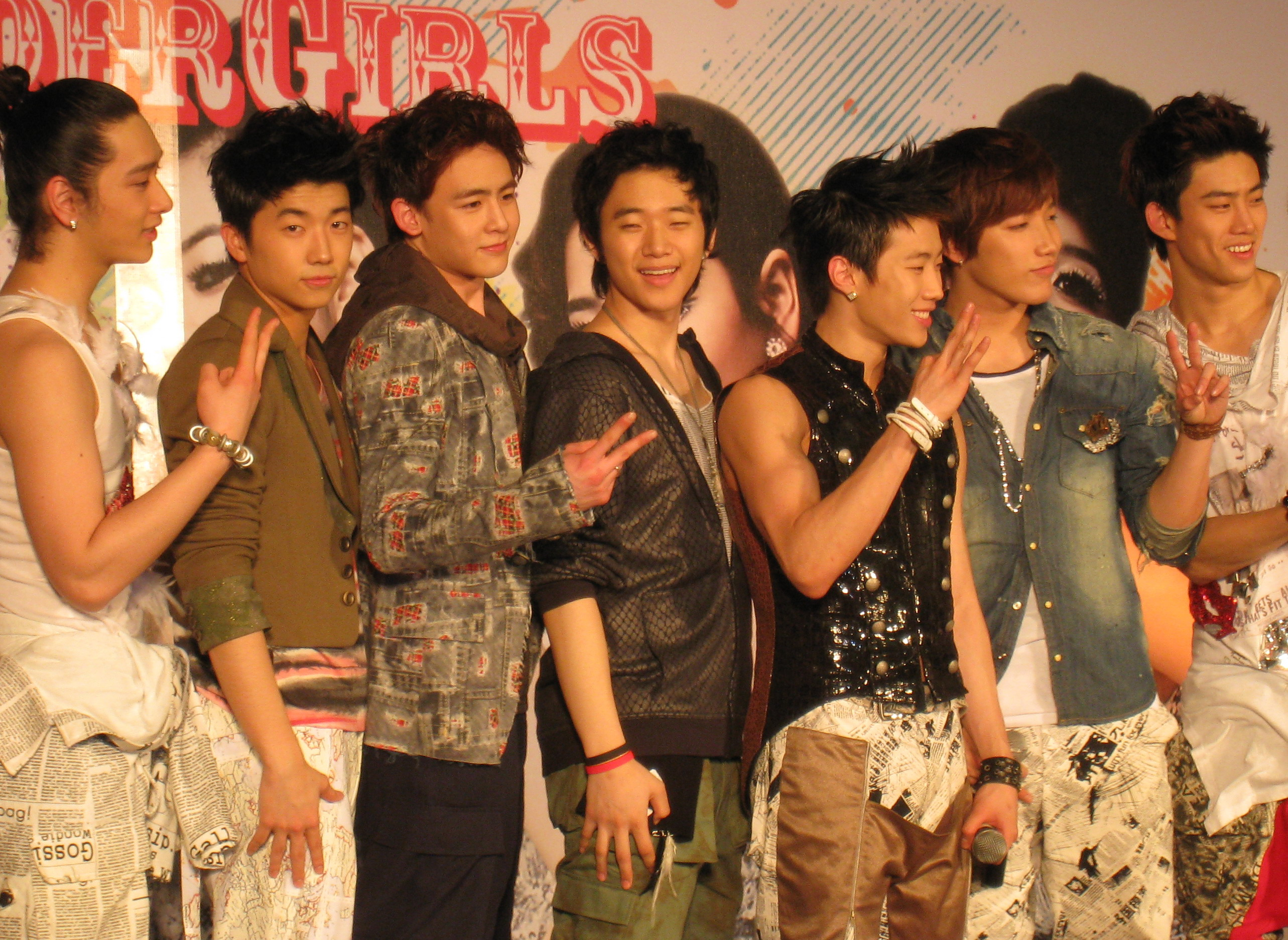
2PM at press conference in Bangkok, February 2009

On April 16, 2009, the group released their second single album, 2:00PM Time For Change, which they began promoting the same month with its title track "Again & Again". This comeback was met with commercial success, with "Again & Again" topping various domestic music charts and earning the group their first music show wins on M Countdown, Music Bank, and Inkigayo. In June, their two single albums were repackaged for a physical release in Thailand titled 2PM Thailand Special Edition; "10 Out of 10", "Again & Again", and the compilation album all topped various Thai music charts, and 2PM was later named the best-selling foreign artist in Thailand based on album sales in 2009. In July, 2PM became the first artist to receive two M Countdown Triple Crown awards with songs from the same album: "Again & Again" and "I Hate You". On August 15, 2PM held their first official fan meeting in Seoul with an audience of about 2,000 members of their fan club, named Hottest. From July to September, 2PM also starred in their own Korean variety show titled Wild Bunny, which was received positively.

A controversy regarding Jaebeom emerged when on September 4, 2009, articles surfaced on the internet regarding his posts from 2005 made on his personal Myspace account, in which he expressed his dislike for Korea while he was still a trainee for JYP Entertainment. These posts, leaked by a netizen who hacked his Myspace account, were taken out of context and severely misinterpreted by the Korean media. Jaebeom issued an apology regarding this matter. Although some netizens demanded Jaebeom's expulsion from 2PM, JYP Entertainment CEO J.Y. Park stated on September 7 that he lent the singer a vote of confidence, suggesting that Jaebeom would remain in the group. However, the following day, Jaebeom announced on his official fancafé that he would be going on hiatus and returning to the United States. In addition, he apologized to his fellow band members and promised to return upon reflecting on his behavior. J.Y. Park confirmed that 2PM would continue on as a six-member group. Due to the sensitive topic of Jaebeom's departure, 2PM withdrew from their appearances on television shows for several weeks.

Despite the controversy, the group went ahead with the release of their first studio album, 01:59PM, on November 10, 2009. The album included tracks from their previous single albums and would go on to top the very first issues of the Gaon Album Chart weeks later. In response to lingering questions regarding Jaebeom's future, J.Y. Park announced on the day after the release of 01:59PM that Jaebeom could return to 2PM if he wished to make a comeback, although the singer's return was not imminent. In support of Jaebeom, the six remaining 2PM members decided to equally split their income from their first album with him. The album included tracks voiced by Jaebeom, although his face was excluded from the cover. The group finished re-filming their music video for the album's title track "Heartbeat" without Jaebeom in October 2009. The group then began promotional activities for the album on TV music programs in November 2009. Performances of "Heartbeat" quickly became popular, with the song's choreography often being parodied on TV shows.

A week and a half after the album's release, 2PM performed at the Mnet Asian Music Awards on November 21, 2009 and won the awards for Best Male Group and Artist of the Year, the latter being one of the three Daesang awards, the most prestigious awards of the show. The group paid homage to Jaebeom during their performance of "Again & Again". During the performance, a spotlight shone over Jaebeom's usual position in the dance formation, and his vocals played over the speakers without being replaced. On December 30, 2009, at the KBS Song Festival, "Again & Again" was recognized as the Song of the Year, winning with 57,060 fan votes. "Again & Again" was also ranked as the fourth most popular song of 2009 in South Korea in Gallup Korea's annual survey and appeared on various domestic year-end music charts. From December 2009 to January 2010, 2PM promoted another single from 01:59PM, "Tired of Waiting", which was also used in promotions for the blockbuster film Jeon Woo-chi: The Taoist Wizard.

In February 2010, JYP Entertainment announced that Jaebeom would not return to 2PM, as his contract with the company had been permanently terminated, with the agreement of all 6 members. A combined fan meeting and press conference was held two days later with the six remaining members of 2PM and JYP Entertainment CEO Choi Jungwook in attendance. Various 2PM fansites were shut down immediately after the conference as a protest of Jaebeom's termination. The record label then announced that although 2PM would move forward with six members, a new leader would not be chosen to replace Jaebeom.

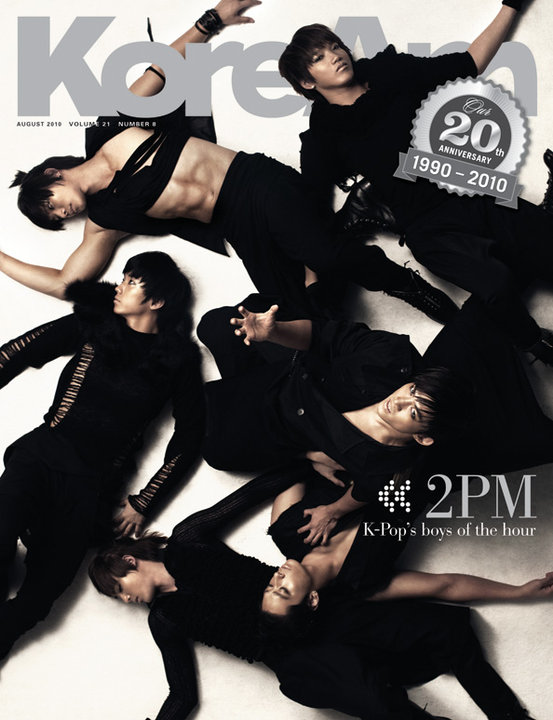
2PM on the cover of KoreAm, August 2010

On April 19, 2010, the band released their third single album Don't Stop Can't Stop, with its title track "Without U" topping the newly-launched Gaon Singles Chart despite the previous controversy over Jaebeom's departure. In June 2010, 2PM served as the opening act for the first nine Wonder Girls concerts in the United States, the first leg of the Wonder Girls World Tour.

On July 31, 2010, 2PM held their first solo concert Don't Stop Can't Stop at the KSPO Dome, with their labelmates 2AM and Miss A making guest appearances at the concert. The group held another concert date in Seoul on August 1, two concerts in Busan on August 7–8, and two encore concerts in Seoul from September 4–5 in line with the celebration of their second debut anniversary. It was reported that more than 12,000 fans attended 2PM's first concerts in Seoul. On August 17, 2010, 2PM released the single "Thank You", a new song dedicated to their fans, which they had first performed at their July 31 concert.

On October 11, 2010, 2PM released their first EP, Still 02:00PM, with the title track "I'll Be Back". On the following month, it was reported that Still 02:00PM unexpectedly debuted at the 13th spot of the Billboard World Albums Chart despite not being promoted in the United States. On October 18, 2PM won the "Most Popular Asian Singer" award at the 10th Annual CCTV-MTV Mandarin Music Honors held at the Wukesong Arena in China. They were the first Korean artist to receive the award, and they performed their songs "Heartbeat" and "I'll Be Back" at the event.

=== 2010–2012: Japanese debut, mainstream success, and first overseas concert tours ===
2PM made their debut live performance in Japan on December 8, 2010 with the release of their Korean album 01:59PM in the country and three showcase performances at the Ryogoku Kokugikan Gymnasium titled 2PM 1st Contact in Japan Live to a total audience of 25,000 fans. They also performed on Japanese television for the first time on Fuji TV's morning news program Tokudane! on December 9 and NHK's music program Music Japan on December 19, becoming the first act to perform a song in the Korean language on Music Japan. Their journey to debut in Japan was documented in the December 18 episode of MBC's documentary program Situational Human Documentary: The Day.

On March 9, 2011, 2PM released a compilation album in Japan titled All About 2PM, a box set comprising the group's previously released albums Hottest Time of the Day, 2:00PM Time for Change, 01:59PM, Don't Stop Can't Stop, and Still 02:00PM. The album debuted at number 26 on the Oricon Albums Chart, selling 4,502 copies in its first week.

On May 18, 2PM released their debut Japanese single, "Take Off", which was featured as the ending theme of the first season of the Blue Exorcist anime series. Concurrently, the group held their first Japanese concert tour, Take Off, which began in Sapporo on May 6 and ended on May 13 in Tokyo.

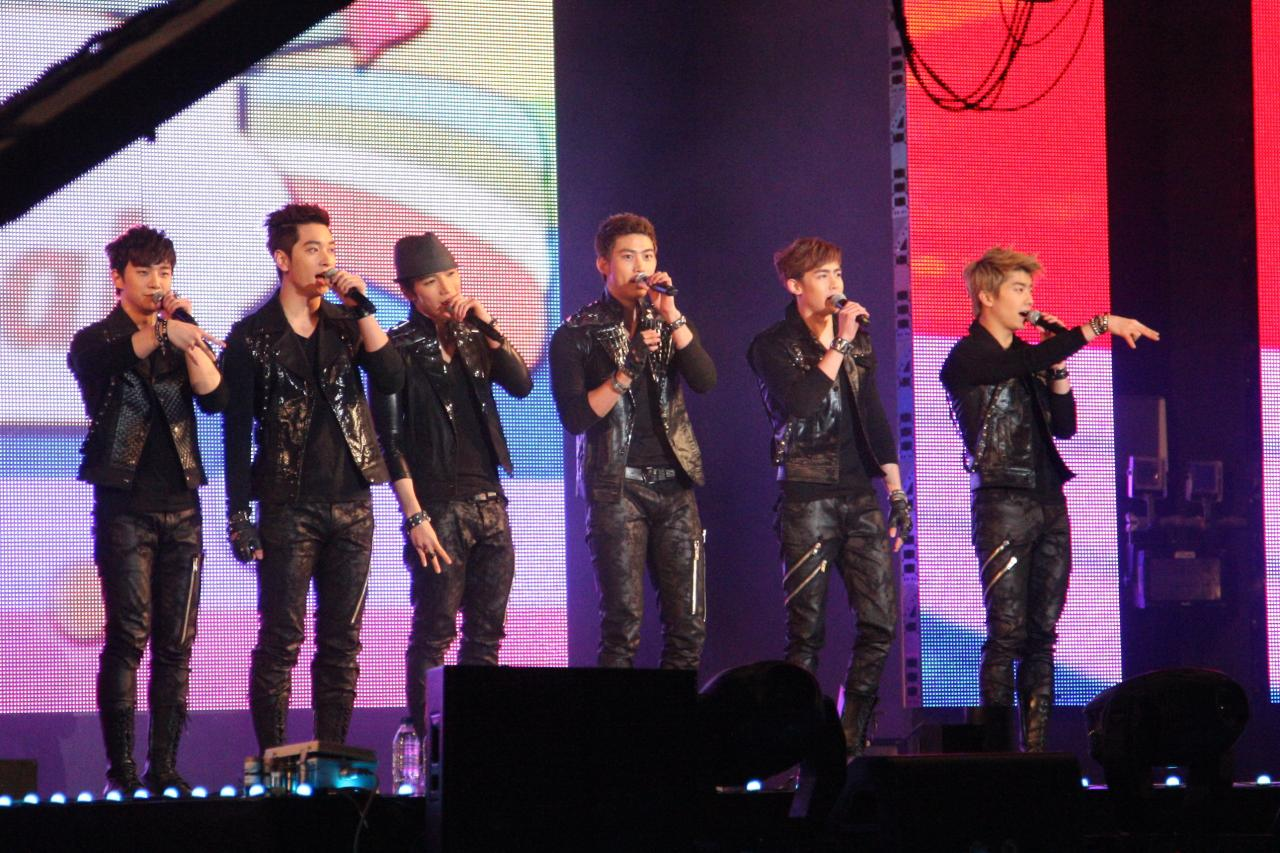
2PM performing at the Cyworld Dream Music Festival, July 2011

On June 20, 2PM released their second studio album, titled Hands Up, which, for the first time since the group's debut, included two songs composed by 2PM members: "Hot" by Jun. K and "Give It to Me" by Junho. Both "Hot" and "Give It To Me" were used in the promotions for the crime thriller film Blind. Party anthem and lead single "Hands Up" debuted on various music charts overseas, and on June 30, 2PM appeared on Billboard's Social 50 Chart, the first documented appearance of a K-pop act on this chart. Concurrently, 2PM starred in their own variety show titled 2PM Show! from July to September.

2PM began their Hands Up Asia Tour with two concerts on September 2–3, 2011 at the Seoul Jamsil Gymnasium with an attendance of over 15,000. The concert tour continued with intermittent breaks for the group to promote their Japanese releases and hold their first Japan arena tour. The group performed in arenas in seven more cities: Taipei, Jakarta, Singapore, Kuala Lumpur, Bangkok, Nanjing, and Hong Kong; the tour concluded with a recorded cumulative attendance of 160,000 people.

On August 17, 2011, 2PM released their second Japanese single, "I'm Your Man". On November 2, 2PM released their third Japanese single, "Ultra Lover". Both singles peaked at number four on the Oricon Singles Chart, and "Ultra Lover" became the group's first single to be certified Gold by RIAJ in December 2011. On November 30, 2PM released their first Japanese-language studio album, Republic of 2PM, which included five new tracks and the group's three previously released Japanese singles. The album debuted at number 4 on the Oricon Albums Chart, reporting over 50,265 copies sold in its first week.

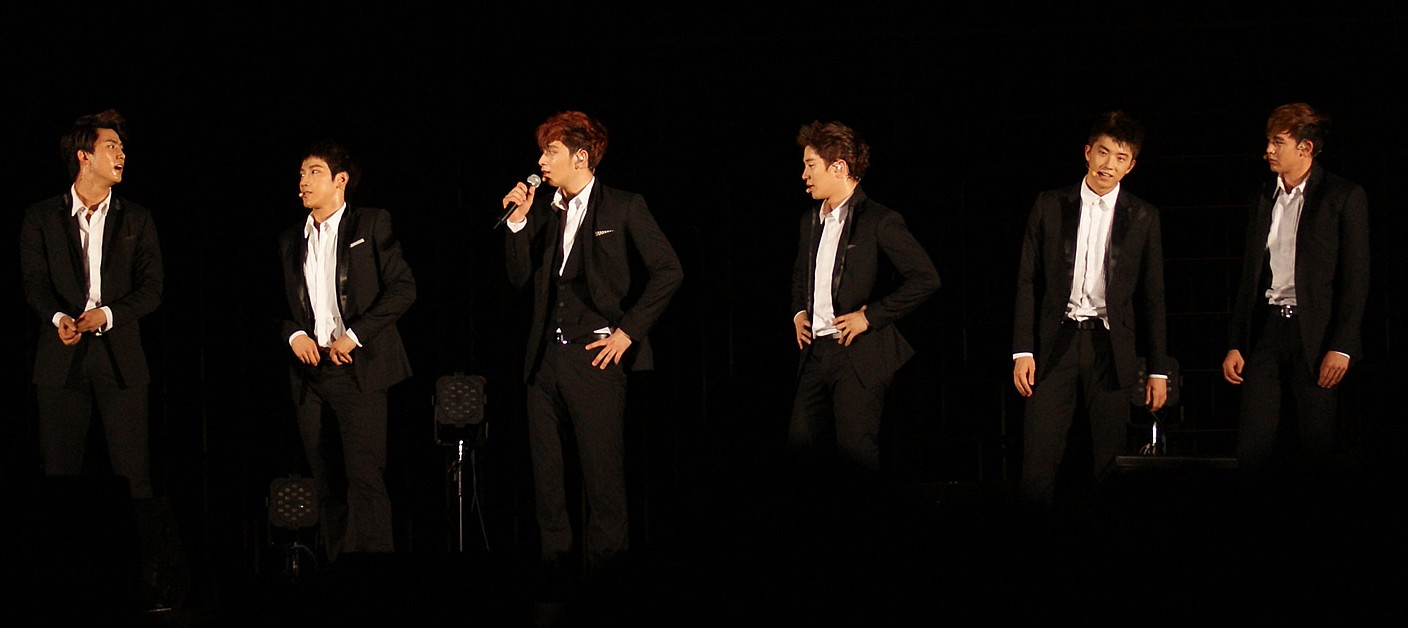
2PM performing at the Jingu Gaien Fireworks Festival in Tokyo, August 2011

From December 3–21, the group embarked on their Japan arena tour Republic of 2PM, but with all 100,000 tickets being sold out in just one minute, JYP Entertainment announced four additional concert dates including two concerts at the Nippon Budokan. Furthermore, 2PM opened its official Japanese fan club called Hottest Japan on December 22. In its annual sales report for the year 2011, Oricon announced that 2PM was the second best-selling new artist in Japan, being the highest-ranking Korean act. According to the report, 2PM reported revenue of over 990 million yen ($12.68 million) in singles, albums, and DVD sales. At the 2012 Japan Gold Disc Awards, 2PM were recognized as the New Artist of the Year in the Asian division (excluding artists from Japan).

On March 14, 2012, 2PM released a compilation album titled 2PM Best ~2008–2011 in Korea~ for the Japanese market, which consisted of 17 of their Korean songs, including the bonus tracks "Alive" and "Move On". The album reached its peak position of number 5 on the Oricon Album Chart, charting for 14 weeks. In April 2012, 2PM announced plans to release a documentary film with 2AM, to be known as Beyond the One Day ~Story of 2PM and 2AM~, in Japan. The trailer for the film was released on April 13, and the film itself premiered on June 30. The theme song of the documentary, "One Day", was released as a digital single on July 4 as a collaboration between 2PM and 2AM, peaking at number five on the Oricon Singles Chart. On May 22, 2012, 2PM released a compilation album titled 2PM Member's Selection for the Korean market. The album topped the Gaon Album Chart and sold 21,893 copies by the end of the year.

2PM became the first Korean group to perform at the Nippon Budokan in Tokyo for six consecutive shows with their Six Beautiful Days concert series on May 24–25 and May 28–31, 2012. The following week, 2PM held two additional solo concerts at the Yokohama Arena on June 5–6. Also on June 6, the group released their fourth Japanese single titled "Beautiful" and a live concert DVD titled Arena Tour 2011: Republic of 2PM. The single sold more than 73,529 copies on the day of its launch, peaked at number two on the Oricon Singles Chart, and was certified Gold by RIAJ the same month, while the DVD peaked at number two on Oricon's Combined DVD Chart. The group then performed at the 2012 MTV Video Music Awards Japan on June 23, where they won the award for Best Group Video for "I'm Your Man".

On November 12, 2012, 2PM began their second Asia-wide concert tour, What Time Is It?, which covered eight cities and concluded on June 22, 2013. On November 14, 2012, 2PM released their fifth Japanese single, "Masquerade", which peaked at number two on the Oricon Singles Chart and was certified Gold by RIAJ the same month.

=== 2013–2014: Legend of 2PM, Grown, Genesis of 2PM and Go Crazy! ===
On February 13, 2013, the group released their second Japanese studio album, Legend of 2PM. The album consisted of 9 tracks including the previously released singles "Beautiful" and "Masquerade". The album debuted atop the Oricon Albums Chart, selling 64,291 copies in its first week, and remained on the chart for nine weeks. The album would go on to win the award for Album of the Year at the 2013 MTV Video Music Awards Japan. 2PM embarked on their Legend of 2PM arena tour from January 13 to February 24, 2013, followed up by two concerts at the Tokyo Dome on April 20–21, which held a recorded combined attendance of over 110,000 people.

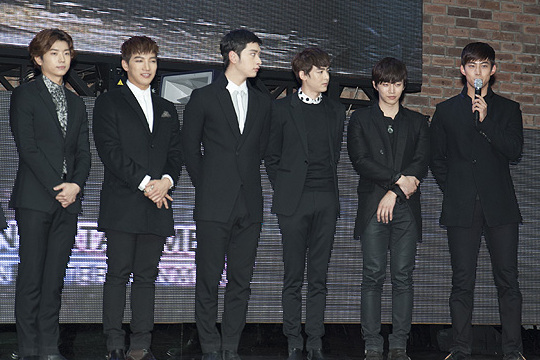
2PM at the Smilegate–JYP Entertainment MoU Signing Ceremony, November 2013

Over a year since Hands Up, 2PM made their Korean comeback in May 2013 with their third Korean studio album, Grown. The album's first title track, "Comeback When You Hear This Song", was released on May 6, along with 10 other songs from the album. Grown became the group's second entry on the Billboard World Albums Chart, becoming their first Top 10 entry upon peaking at number 6, and remained on the chart for three weeks. The album's second title track, "A.D.T.O.Y.", was released on May 11. "A.D.T.O.Y." was later recognized by Billboard magazine, ranking at number 13 in its "20 Best K-pop Songs of 2013: K-Town Picks" list.

On May 29, 2013, 2PM released their sixth Japanese single, "Give Me Love", which peaked at number two on the Oricon Singles Chart and was certified Gold by RIAJ that same month. On September 7–8, 2013, the group held their first official fan meetings in Japan titled YaZoo to a combined total audience of 48,000 fans, where they introduced their individual animal mascot characters collectively known as ZooPM and first performed their upcoming single, "Winter Games". On October 16, 2013, the group released "Winter Games" as their seventh Japanese single, which was certified Gold by RIAJ that same month, peaked atop the Oricon Singles Chart, and became the group's first chart-topper on the Billboard Japan Hot 100 on its issue dated November 2, 2013.

On January 29, 2014, 2PM released their third Japanese studio album, Genesis of 2PM, consisting of 9 new tracks and the previously released singles "Give Me Love" and "Winter Games". The album debuted atop the Oricon Albums Chart, selling 63,212 copies in its first week, and remained on the chart for seven weeks. In support of the album, the group embarked on their arena tour Genesis of 2PM, held from January 27 to March 27, 2014, performing in five cities in Japan with a recorded attendance of over 150,000.

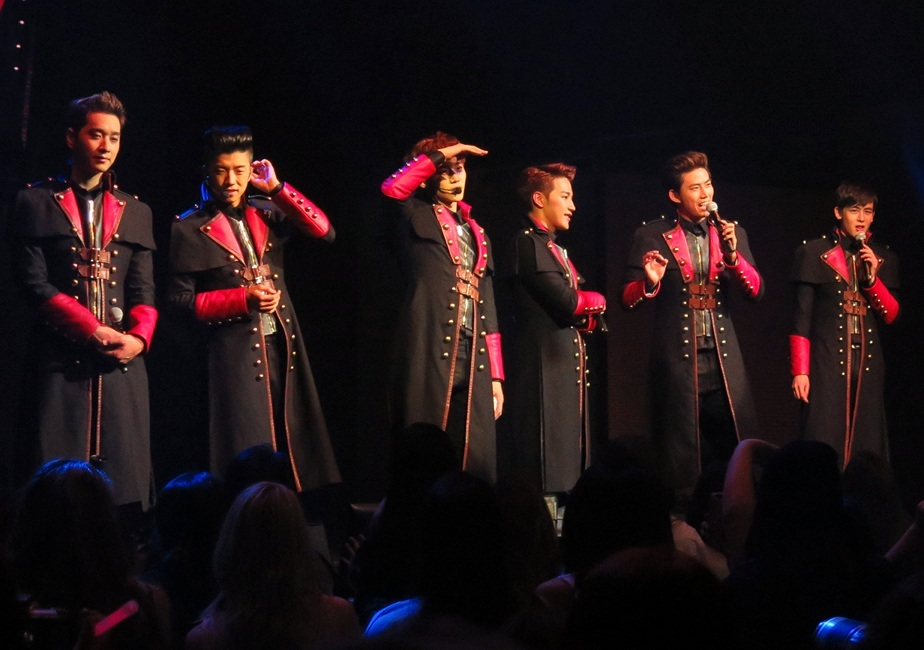
2PM performing in the US for their "Go Crazy" World Tour, November 2014

On September 15, 2PM released the fourth Korean studio album, Go Crazy!, with a title track of the same name; "Go Crazy!" marked the group's first self-composed single, having been written by Jun. K. On September 17, 2PM released a Japanese version of "Go Crazy!" titled "Midaretemina" as their eighth Japanese single, which peaked at number two on the Oricon Singles Chart and was certified Gold by RIAJ the same month. Go Crazy! marked 2PM's third appearance on the Billboard World Albums Chart, peaking at number 7 on its chart issue dated October 4, 2014. On its chart issue dated on the same day, Billboard reported that 2PM also landed their second Japan Hot 100 chart topper with "Midaretemina". The music video for "Go Crazy!" also won an award for Best Music Video at the 2014 Mnet Asian Music Awards.

In support of their latest album, 2PM then began their first world tour, "Go Crazy" World Tour, with a sold-out concert at the Jamsil Arena in Seoul on October 3, 2014. The concert tour covered 12 cities in 5 countries: Seoul, Bangkok, Beijing, Newark, Rosemont, Grand Prairie, Los Angeles, Guangzhou, Nanjing, Hong Kong, Jakarta, and Shanghai. With performances at major venues such as the Prudential Center, Rosemont Theatre, Verizon Theatre, and the Shrine Auditorium, the Go Crazy concert series marked the group's first solo concerts in the United States, having previously performed as opening acts for their labelmates Wonder Girls in 2010.

=== 2015–2017: 2PM of 2PM, No.5, Galaxy of 2PM, and Gentlemen's Game ===
On January 18, 2015, the group released their ninth Japanese single, "Guilty Love", which peaked atop the Oricon Singles Chart and was certified Gold by RIAJ the same month. On April 15, the group released their fourth Japanese studio album, 2PM of 2PM, which featured 13 tracks including the group's previous singles "Midaretemina" and "Guilty Love". The album debuted atop the Oricon Albums Chart, selling over 62,705 copies in its first week, and remained on the chart for 10 weeks. The album would go on to be one of three albums in the Asia division to win a Japan Gold Disc Award in 2016. In support of their album, 2PM embarked on their arena tour 2PM of 2PM from April 7 to May 31, 2015, recording a total attendance of over 150,000. An additional 13,000 people also attended the live concert viewing held in 50 movie theaters in 34 regions throughout Japan.

After a two-week delay caused by troubles with their initially-contracted video production company, Dextor Lab, 2PM released their fifth Korean studio album, No.5, on June 15, 2015. Nine of the twelve songs on the album were written by the members, with the title track "My House" being written by Jun. K. The album performed well commercially, debuting atop the Gaon Album Chart, at number 14 on the Oricon Album Chart, and at number three on the Billboard World Albums Chart. By the end of 2015, it was reported that No.5 sold 62,618 copies in South Korea.

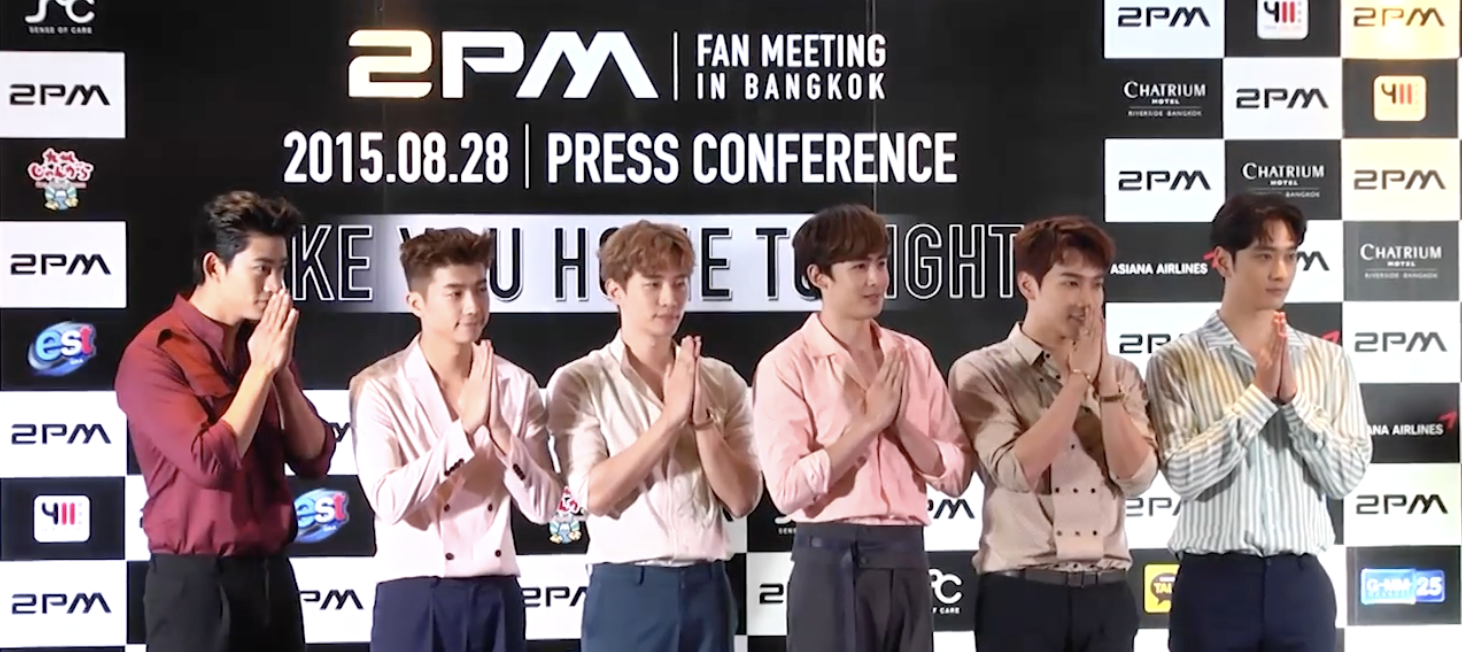
2PM at a press conference for their Take You Home Tonight fan meeting in Bangkok, August 2015

On June 27–28, 2PM held solo concerts titled House Party in Seoul at the KSPO Dome. This would be followed by solo concerts titled House Party in Japan at the Saitama Super Arena on August 22–23, their first official fan meeting in Thailand titled Take You Home Tonight at the Thunder Dome in Bangkok on August 29, and a solo concert titled House Party in Bangkok at the Impact Arena on March 20, 2016.

On October 21, 2015, the group released their tenth Japanese single, "Higher", which peaked at number two on the Oricon Singles Chart and was certified Gold by RIAJ in the same month. Concurrently, 2PM held a concert tour from October 7–29 titled Six "Higher" Days with three shows in Tokyo, Osaka, Yokohama, and Nagoya each, a total of twelve shows with a total recorded attendance of 130,000.

On April 27, 2016, the group released their fifth Japanese studio album, Galaxy of 2PM, which featured twelve tracks including tracks from "Higher". The album debuted atop the Oricon Album Chart and remained on the said chart for seven weeks. In May, the album was certified Gold by RIAJ, and by the end of the year, the album had sold over 122,685 copies according to Oricon. The album would go on to be one of three albums in the Asia division to win a Japan Gold Disc Award in 2017. In support of the album, 2PM embarked on their arena tour titled Galaxy of 2PM, which was held from April 23 to June 18, 2016, covering the cities of Nagoya, Tokyo, Fukuoka, Hokkaido, and Osaka. All 15 concert dates were sold out, and at the conclusion of the tour, the group had recorded an attendance of 160,000 people with an additional 35,000 fans who attended the live viewing of the concert held in 134 movie theaters throughout Japan. The group then followed up with two concert dates held at the Tokyo Dome on October 26–27 titled The 2PM at Tokyo Dome with a recorded attendance of 100,000, marking the group's 99th and 100th solo concerts in Japan.

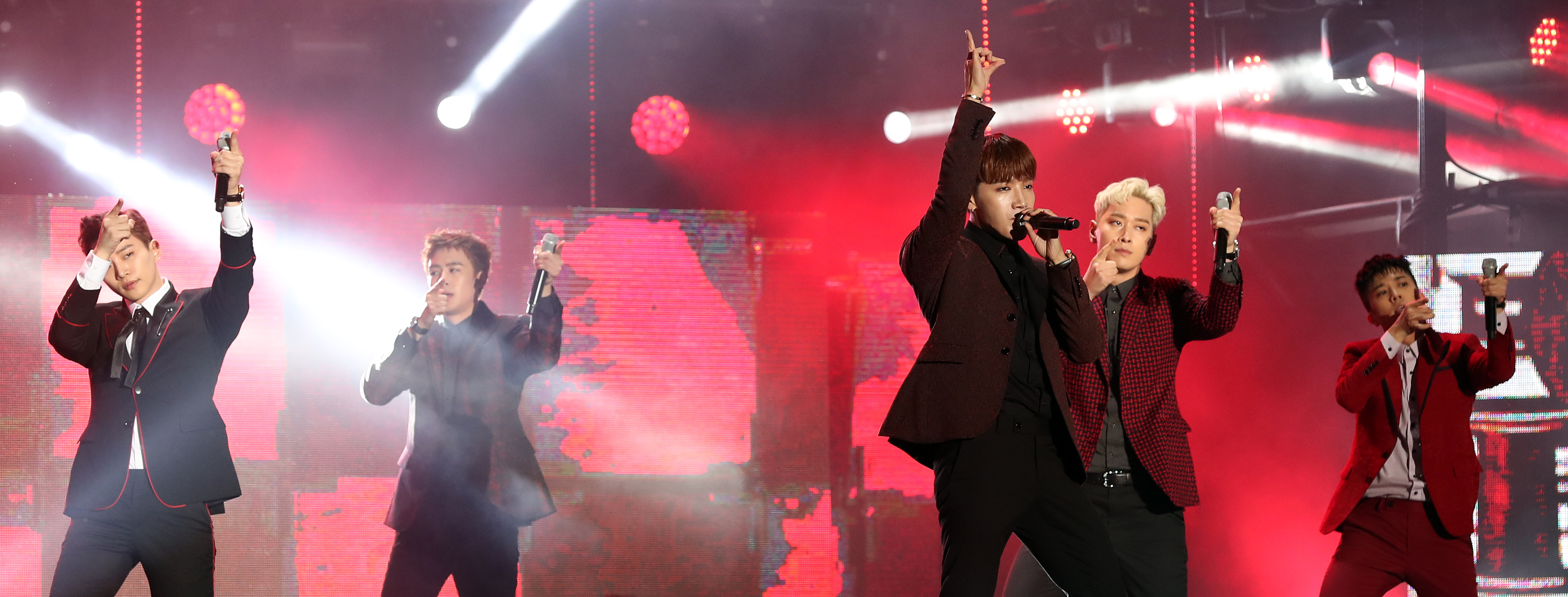
2PM performing at the Korea Sale Festa, September 2016

The group's sixth Korean studio album titled Gentlemen's Game was released on September 13, with the title track "Promise (I'll Be)" written by Taecyeon. The album peaked atop the Gaon Album Chart and entered the Billboard World Albums Chart for two weeks, peaking at number 11. On October 26, 2016, 2PM released a Japanese version of "Promise (I'll Be)" as their eleventh Japanese single, which reached number two on the Oricon Weekly Singles Chart. In November, the single was certified Gold by RIAJ.

In February 2017, 2PM's variety show 2PM Wild Beat began airing on E! Asia. 2PM also announced they would hold a concert series titled 6Nights at the SK Olympic Handball Gymnasium scheduled for February 24–26, 2017 and March 3–5, 2017, the group's final concert series before the members began their mandatory military enlistment. Each show would have a different setlist focusing on a different member. However, due to an injury sustained by Jun. K during their February 26 concert, the last three concerts were rescheduled for June 2–4, 2017 at Korea University's Hwajeong Gymnasium, and an additional set of concert dates from June 9–11 at the same venue was added.

=== 2017–2020: Group hiatus ===
Taecyeon enlisted for his mandatory military service on September 4, 2017. On January 31, 2018, five of the six members of 2PM signed their renewal to JYP Entertainment, with Taecyeon's renewal to be discussed after his military service. The following day, JYP Entertainment appointed the members of 2PM as directors of external affairs, as they were the most senior group remaining in the company.

Jun. K also entered the military on May 8, 2018 after delaying his enlistment due to his injury sustained during one of the 6Nights concerts. Wooyoung enlisted on July 8, serving active duty. On July 25, it was announced that Taecyeon decided not to re-sign with JYP Entertainment, instead signing with 51K, an agency specializing in actors. However, he stated that he would continue promoting with 2PM. Taecyeon completed his military service and was discharged on May 16, 2019. Junho began his military service on May 30, 2019, as a public service worker, and Chansung enlisted on June 11, 2019.

During the group's hiatus, JYP Entertainment and Epic Records Japan released three compilation albums in Japan. In celebration of 2PM's tenth anniversary in 2018, a fan vote titled 2PM Awards was held; the results were announced on September 26 on a Music On! TV special broadcast, and a digital compilation album of the top-ranking songs titled 2PM Awards Selection was released on September 27. On September 18, 2019, the compilation album 2PM Best in Korea 2 ～2012–2017～, was released, consisting of 15 of the group's songs previously released in Korea from 2012 to 2017. The album peaked at number 7 on the Oricon Albums Chart and remained on the chart for three weeks. On March 13, 2020, the Japanese-language compilation album The Best of 2PM in Japan 2011–2016 was released, consisting of two CDs containing a total of 38 songs previously released in Japan. Taking pre-order sales into consideration, the album topped the Oricon Albums Chart and Tower Records Daily Sales Chart upon release. JYP Entertainment and Epic Records Japan also released several DVDs of past concert footage in Japan during the group's hiatus.

Although 2PM did not release any new music as a group during the hiatus, each member released at least one solo album in Japan from 2017 to 2020, with Taecyeon, Chansung, and Nichkhun all releasing their debut solo albums. In addition, while 2PM never performed as a full group during their hiatus, several members made appearances together at concerts: Jun. K, Wooyoung, and Junho held a concert together titled From 2PM to You at the Yokohama Arena on November 3, 2017, and Taecyeon was joined by Nichkhun, Wooyoung, Junho, and Chansung at the headliner show for the Pyeongchang 2018 Winter Olympics.

=== 2020–present: End of military service, group comeback, and anniversary concerts ===
Jun. K completed his military service and was discharged on January 2, 2020. Wooyoung was also discharged on February 25, 2020. Chansung was discharged on January 5, 2021. It was announced in January 2021 that 2PM would make a full group comeback later in the year, after Junho completed his military service. Junho was discharged on March 20, completing 2PM's military services.

In early 2020, the music video and performance footage of "My House", 2PM's title track from their 2015 Korean album No.5, suddenly went viral on YouTube, causing the song to reenter various music streaming charts and spawn dance challenge videos. In early 2021, 2PM began airing the web content series Wild Six on YouTube, with later episodes marking the first time 2PM would be seen together as a full group since their mandatory military enlistment. This web series would later be broadcast on Mnet. Following guest appearances on popular YouTube variety series MMTG, 2PM made their first performance together as a full group since 2017 with "My House" on MMTG's "Songs that Deserve a Comeback" Concert special broadcast on SBS on June 11, 2021.

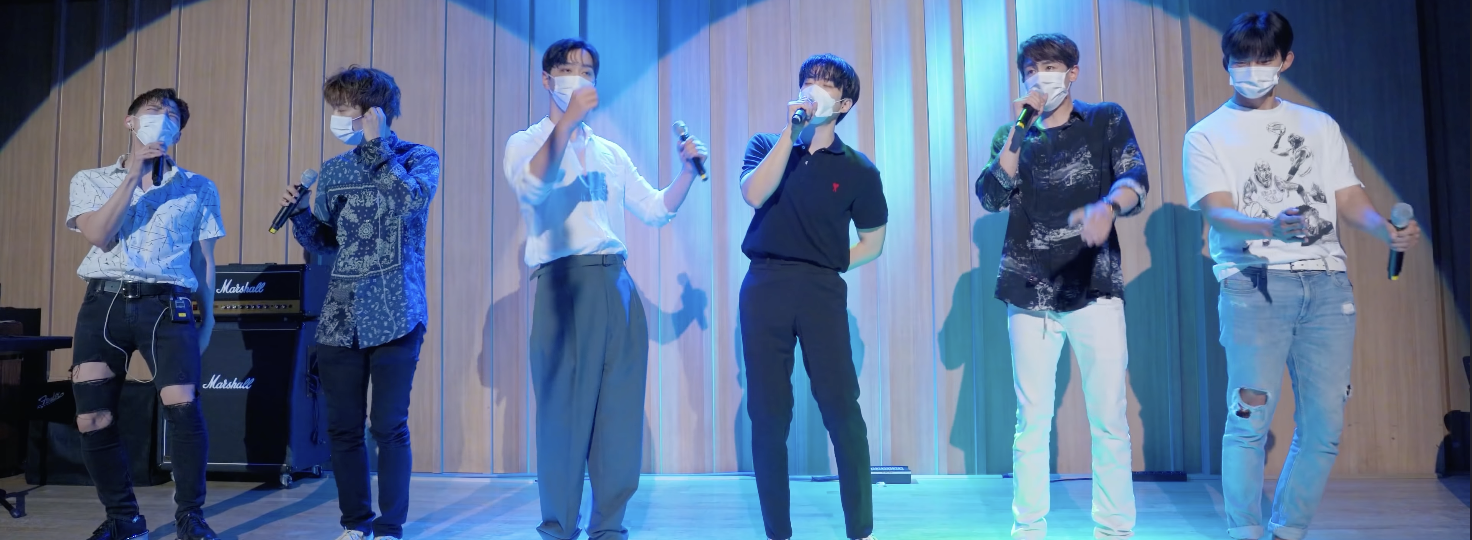
2PM performing on SBS Power FM, July 2021

On June 7, 2021, it was announced that 2PM would make a comeback with their seventh studio album Must. The album marked four years since their hiatus and five years since the release of Gentlemen's Game. Along with a television special focused on the group aired by Mnet, Must was released on June 28. The album featured ten tracks, seven of which were produced by 2PM members, including title track "Make It", which was co-written by Wooyoung. Must reached number three on the Gaon Albums Chart and number four on the Oricon Albums Chart.

2PM celebrated their 13th anniversary on September 4 with a fan meeting titled Dear. Hottest, which was held online via Beyond Live due to the COVID-19 pandemic in South Korea. On September 29, 2021, 2PM released their first Japanese EP With Me Again, featuring seven tracks including a title track of the same name written by Jun. K digitally pre-released on September 9. The mini-album peaked at number two on the Oricon Albums Chart.

In occasion of their 15th anniversary, 2PM held concerts titled It's 2PM at the Jamsil Indoor Stadium in Seoul from September 9–10, 2023 and at the Ariake Arena in Tokyo from October 7–8, 2023. In addition, an unofficial sub-unit of Jun. K, Nichkhun, and Wooyoung called ENWJ held five concerts together in Tokyo, Kobe, Bangkok, and Taipei from 2023 to 2024. Also in 2024, Jun. K, Nichkhun, Wooyoung, and Chansung performed together on August 30 for a show celebrating J.Y. Park's 30th anniversary, which was later aired on KBS on September 16 under the title KBS Korea's Mega Performance Project – 30th Anniversary Special "Ddanddara JYP". On December 27, Jun. K, Nichkhun, Taecyeon, and Wooyoung performed together as guests at J.Y. Park's 30th anniversary concert titled Still JYP.

On January 6, 2026, it was announced that 2PM would hold concerts in Japan in commemoration of their 15th anniversary since debuting in Japan. On February 2, 2026, JYP posted a teaser video and poster through their official social media channels revealing that the concerts, titled "The Return" in Tokyo Dome, would be held on May 9–10, 2026, ten years after their last concerts at that venue. The concert attracted over 85,000 fans over two shows, and a Korean leg of "The Return" was announced. "The Return" in Incheon was held on August 8–9, 2026 at a sold out Inspire Arena.

== Other activities ==
=== Television hosting ===
In December 2008, 2PM began hosting the third season of MBC's Idol Show (아이돌군단의 떴다!그녀) with senior entertainer Boom. The program ran from December 4, 2008 to March 26, 2009, with a total of seventeen episodes. In 2009, the group starred in a reality show on Mnet titled Wild Bunny, in which the members performed activities "forbidden" to idols, such as sneaking out. The show ran from July 21, 2009 to September 1, 2009, with seven episodes aired. The airing of the final episode, which featured the members engaged in a "Leader Olympics" game to select a new leader, was postponed indefinitely due to Jaebeom's controversy and subsequent departure from the group.

From 2008 to 2011, 2PM members were individually cast for various Korean variety shows and TV music programs in overlapping timeframes, most notably, Inkigayo, M Countdown, Star King, Let's Go! Dream Team Season 2, Family Outing 2, and We Got Married. In July 2011, 2PM Show!, another variety show hosted by the full group, began airing on SBS Plus.

From 2012 to 2014, following their breakthrough success in Japan, 2PM hosted two Japanese TV shows: Wander Trip, a travel program co-starring 2AM, and two seasons of One Point Korean, an educational program teaching Japanese audiences the Korean language. Upon debuting as a soloist in Japan in the summer of 2013, Junho hosted a solo variety program in Japan titled Junho (From 2PM)'s Say Yes ~Friendship~. Members would individually continue to host music shows and award shows and be cast for various variety programs to date, including Chinese and Thai TV shows.

In 2017, 2PM starred in a variety program titled 2PM Wild Beat, their final TV program together prior to their mandatory military enlistment. The show was filmed in Australia in November 2016 and featured the members earning money to fund their trip from Melbourne to Uluru through various challenges and real part-time jobs over the course of nine days.

=== Endorsements ===
Early in their career, 2PM established themselves among the most prominent advertising models in South Korea. They signed endorsement deals for and worked with several high-profile brands including Calvin Klein, Coca-Cola, Paris Baguette, Lotte Duty Free, Everland, Mr. Pizza, and Korean clothing brand NEPA. The group has released several promotional singles for such companies, such as the songs "My Color" and "Nori For U" (노리 포 유) for Samsung Anycall, "Crazy4S" for clothing brand SPRIS, "Tik Tok" featuring Yoon Eun-hye for Cass Beer, and "Cabi Song", a collaboration with Caribbean Bay co-spokespeople Girls' Generation. For Coca-Cola alone, 2PM released three promotional singles: the Korean version of "Open Happiness" (오픈 해피니스); a song sampling K'Naan's "Wavin' Flag" titled "What's Your Celebration?" (너만의 짜릿한 세레모니를 보여줘!), which was used as part of a campaign during the 2010 FIFA World Cup; and "Share the Beat" (셰어 더 비트), which was used as part of a campaign during the 2012 Summer Olympics.

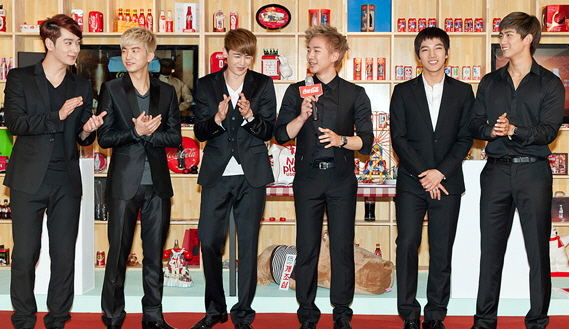
2PM at a pop-up exhibition for Coca-Cola, June 2011

In July 2009, the members of 2PM were selected as the representatives of foreign artists by the Thai government-led tourism campaign, I Love Thailand. Nichkhun was also selected by the Tourism Authority of Thailand as the face of their campaign, Come to Thailand; Let's Take a Break!, releasing a promotional single titled "Let's Take a Break" in August. The group has also endorsed various brands in Thailand such as Thai snack company Hanami and Chinese electronics manufacturer Oppo, releasing a promotional single titled "Follow Your Soul" for the latter.

2PM has also worked as promotional ambassadors on tourism campaigns for South Korea. In August 2010, 2PM released the promotional single "Fly To Seoul (Boom Boom Boom)". In November 2011, Annyeong, a short interactive film starring 2PM and their labelmates Miss A for the Korea Tourism Organization (KTO)'s Touch Korea campaign was released. In June 2012, 2PM and Miss A continued their work as ambassadors for the KTO by participating in a Touch Korea Tour program with foreign K-pop fans.

In April 2013, 2PM released their first Chinese song, "Shining in the Night", a promotional single used for the video game soundtrack of Tencent Games' QQ Dance 2. Later that year, 2PM and Miss A partnered with South Korean video game developer Smilegate to work on CFs for the official relaunch of the Korean first-person shooter game Crossfire due to the game's massive audience in both South Korea and China; characters based on each of the groups' members were added to the game as a limited-time event.

Following the group's return from their hiatus, 2PM endorsed sportswear brand Xexymix in April 2021.

== Artistry ==
=== Stage and image ===
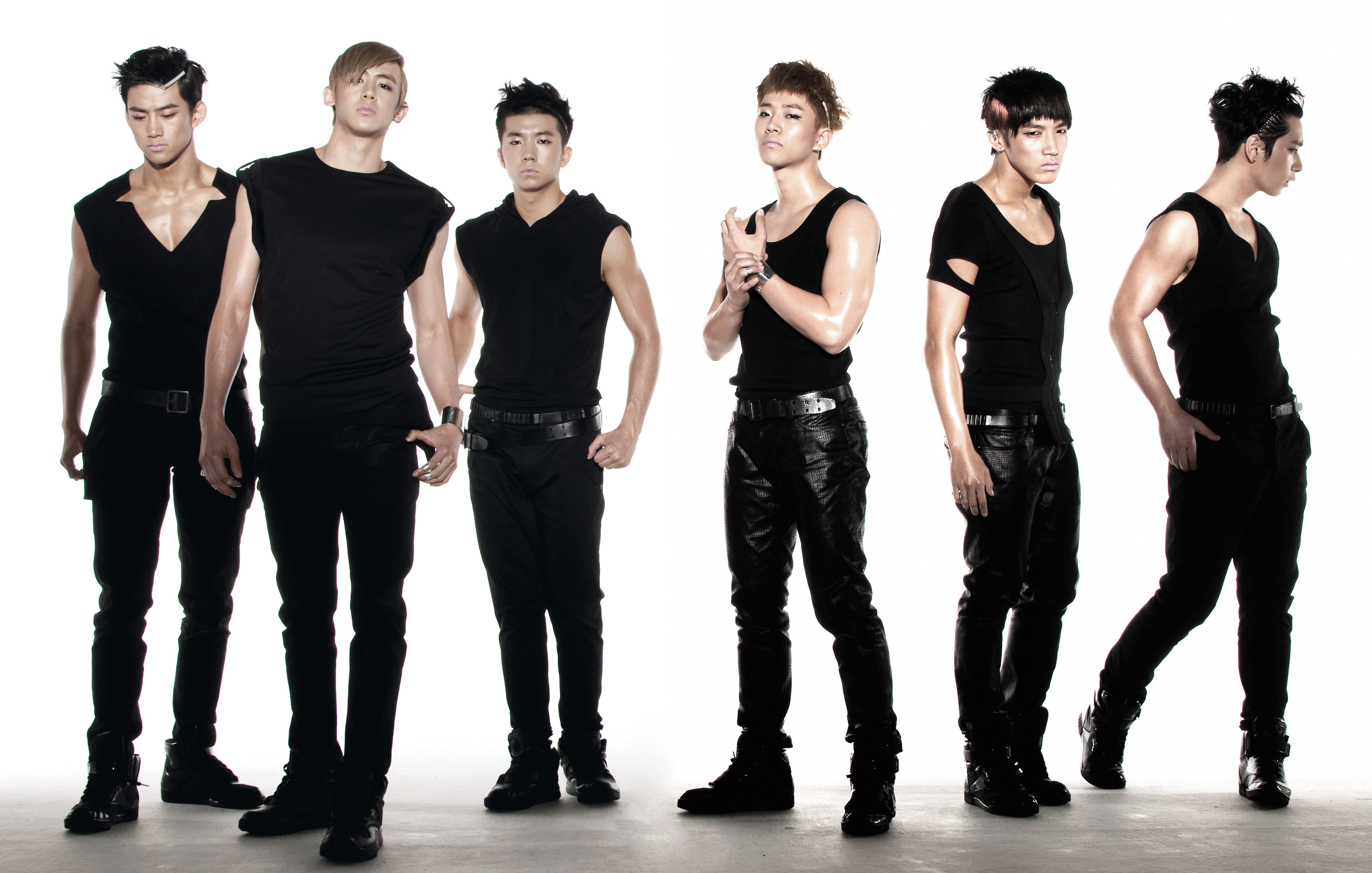
2PM was known for their "masculine" image compared to other K-pop boy groups of their time.

2PM have been credited with originating the term jimseung-dol (짐승돌), a portmanteau of the words jimseung ("beast" or "wild animal") and idol. They opted against the trending youthful kkonminam ("flower boy") image, debuting with a more mature "wild" and "beast-like" image that matched their heights and muscular physiques. Although not the first K-pop group to utilize acrobatics in their performances, they were the first group to regularly incorporate acrobatics-inspired moves into their live performances and choreography, with representative examples being "10 Out of 10", "Heartbeat", and "I'll Be Back". NME noted, "The group stood out, thanks to their dynamic, acrobatic choreography and hyper masculine image, which cemented them as K-pop's OG 'beast idols'." The jimseung-dol moniker was further solidified due to Taecyeon's frequent practice of tearing his shirt off at the end of performances of "Heartbeat", a practice generally unheard of among idol groups at the time. The popularity of this practice encouraged the group as a whole to lean into their sex appeal through suggestive choreography in performances of songs such as "I'm Your Man" and "Back 2U".

By 2013, the group stopped incorporating acrobatics into their choreography due to injury risks as members entered their mid-twenties. Their album Grown has been described as the turning point in their image, from the unrestrained "wild, beast-like" reputation they debuted with into a more sophisticated and "discreetly sexy" image; the choreographies for the album's promoted singles "A.D.T.O.Y." and "Comeback When You Hear This Song" were described to be more minimalistic and "restrained" yet just as "charm[ing]".

=== Musical style and themes ===
2PM's overall musical style has generally been described as being musically rooted in the R&B genre, often combined with electronic influences. Academic Crystal S. Anderson opined that their later discography strongly leaned towards the R&B genre of "quiet storm" as the group transitioned into a sophisticated and mature masculine concept, beginning with the 2013 album Grown.

They have occasionally experimented with genres; for example, "Go Crazy!", the lead single of the eponymously named 2014 album, was described as "[straddling] the line" between funk and EDM. The songs in their discography range from pop ballads such as "At Times" (문득), to emotional dance tracks such as "Without U" and "I'll Be Back", to party anthems such as "Hands Up". Their Japanese discography also explores music genres and dance styles not as prominent in their Korean discography, such as their track "Merry-Go-Round" exploring the pop rock genre or the choreography of their single "Beautiful" featuring voguing.

Some of their songs garnered attention due to the overtly sensual nature of the lyrics. The self-composed "Make Love" from Gentlemen's Game was notably banned by the Korean Broadcasting System due to its lyrics describing one's desire to have sex with a lover.

== Legacy ==
MTV Asia stated, "[They] rose to prominence as their catchy lyrics and easy-to-follow dance moves exploded in the early days of YouTube, long predating today's viral TikTok challenges. They were also the first group to embody the jimseung-dol, or beast-like idol, a charismatic and sensual archetype that has influenced the presentation of newer acts like Monsta X." 2PM has been noted for successfully transitioning into a "manband" without overly relying on sex appeal gimmicks such as taking off their shirts, with Melon's e-magazine dubbing them "classic K-sexy" during their 2021 comeback from hiatus. The members of Monsta X themselves, as well as of newer idol groups such as Seventeen, SF9, and labelmates Stray Kids, have cited 2PM as "role models" for their stage presence and charisma during live performances.

2PM has won numerous music awards, including a Daesang award for Artist of the Year the 2009 Mnet Asian Music Awards. They have also won the awards for Best Male Group (2009 and 2010), Best Dance Performance (2010) for "I'll Be Back", and Best Music Video (2014) for "Go Crazy!" at the Mnet Asian Music Awards. In addition, they have won an Album Bonsang (2009) at the Golden Disc Awards, two Bonsangs (2009 and 2010) as a Top 10 Artist at the Melon Music Awards, and a Bonsang (2009) at the Seoul Music Awards. Their Japanese discography has also received several accolades, with Legend of 2PM winning the award for Album of the Year at the 2013 MTV Video Music Awards Japan, and 2PM of 2PM and Galaxy of 2PM being awarded as one of the top three Asian albums (excluding releases by domestic artists) at the Japan Gold Disc Awards in 2016 and 2017 respectively.

The group has appeared on the Forbes Korea Power Celebrity 40 four times, from 2010 to 2013, peaking at fifth place. The group also placed in the top ten of Gallup Korea's Singer of the Year polls three times, from 2009 to 2011, peaking at second place, and they placed eighth on Gallup Korea's 2024 survey of the most beloved boy groups of the 21st century. In 2019, Billboard placed 2PM's song "A.D.T.O.Y." at number 36 on their list of the 100 Greatest K-pop Songs of the 2010s. In 2021, Melon and Seoul Shinmun placed "Heartbeat" at number 35 on their list of the Top 100 K-pop Masterpieces as determined by thirty-five music critics and industry experts. In 2023, Rolling Stone placed "Hands Up" at number 44 on their list of the 100 Greatest Songs in the History of Korean Pop Music.

== Members ==
Current

- Jun. K (준케이) - Vocalist
- Nichkhun (닉쿤) - Vocalist, Rapper, Visual
- Taecyeon (택연) - Rapper, Visual
- Wooyoung (우영) - Vocalist, Dancer
- Junho (준호) - Vocalist, Dancer
- Chansung (찬성) - Rapper, Vocalist

Former

- Jaebeom (재범) - Leader, Vocalist, Rapper, Dancer

== Discography ==
Korean albums

- 01:59PM (2009)
- Hands Up (2011)
- Grown (2013)
- Go Crazy! (2014)
- No.5 (2015)
- Gentlemen's Game (2016)
- Must (2021)

Japanese albums

- Republic of 2PM (2011)
- Legend of 2PM (2013)
- Genesis of 2PM (2014)
- 2PM of 2PM (2015)
- Galaxy of 2PM (2016)

== Filmography ==
Films

- Annyeong (2011)
- Beyond the One Day ~Story of 2PM and 2AM~ (2012)

Reality shows

- Hot Blooded Men (2008)
- Idol Show Season 3 (2009)
- It's Time 2PM (2009)
- Wild Bunny (2009)
- 2PM Show! (2011)
- One Point Korean (2012–2014)
- Wander Trip (2012)
- 2PM Wild Beat (2017)
- Wild Six (2021)

== Concert tours ==
World tours

- "Go Crazy" World Tour (2014)

Asia tours and concerts

- Don't Stop Can't Stop (2010)
- Hands Up Asia Tour (2011–2012)
- "What Time Is It?" Asia Tour (2012–2013)
- House Party (2015–2016)
- 6Nights (2017)
- It's 2PM (2023)
- The Return (2026)

Japan tours and concerts

- Take Off (2011)
- Republic of 2PM (2011)
- Six Beautiful Days (2012)
- Legend of 2PM (2013)
- Genesis of 2PM (2014)
- 2PM of 2PM (2015)
- Six "Higher" Days (2016)
- Galaxy of 2PM (2016)
- The 2PM in Tokyo Dome (2016)
