= Jaejae =

South Korean producer, host and television personality

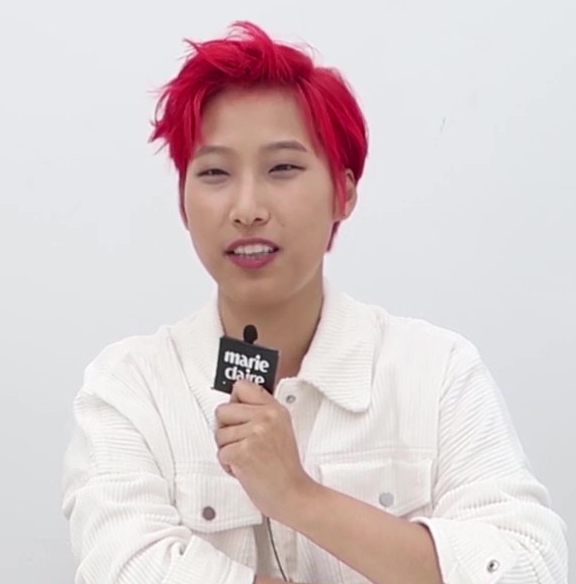
- Jaejae in 2019
- Born: Lee Eun-jae; September 7, 1990 (age 35); South Korea
- Occupations: Production director; host; television personality
- Years active: 2018–present
- Employer: SBS

Korean name
- Hangul: 이은재
- RR: I Eunjae
- MR: I Ŭnjae

Stage name
- Hangul: 재재
- RR: Jaejae
- MR: Chaejae

Lee Eun-jae (born September 7, 1990), known professionally as Jaejae, is a South Korean television producer, host, and television personality. She is best known as the host for MMTG.

== Filmography ==
=== Television series ===
| Year | Title | Role | Notes | Ref. |
|---|---|---|---|---|
| 2020 | Pop Out Boy! | Hairdresser, Art teacher & Photographer | Cameo (Episode 3, 4 & 9) | |
| 2021 | Awaken | Waitress | Cameo (Episode 13) | |

=== Television shows ===
| Year | Title | Role | Notes | Ref. |
|---|---|---|---|---|
| 2020 | Hidden Golden Tracks Concert | Host | Also as PD | |
| 2021 | Long Live Independence | Cast member | | |
| 2022 | The Hall of Yesul | Host | | |
| 2022 | Music Universe K-909 | Host | K-pop professor | |
| 2022 | Scholarship Quiz | Special MC | with Pengsoo | |

=== Web shows ===
| Year | Title | Role | Notes | Ref. |
|---|---|---|---|---|
| 2018–present | MMTG | Host | SBS program | |
| 2021 | Idol Dictation Contest | Cast member | Season 1–2 | |
| 2021–2024 | Girls High School Mystery Class | Cast member | Season 1–3 | |

=== Radio shows ===
| Year | Title | Role | Notes | Ref. |
|---|---|---|---|---|
| 2023–24 | JaeJae Two O'Clock Date | DJ | MBC FM4U | |

=== Hosting ===
| Year | Title | Notes | Ref. |
|---|---|---|---|
| 2022 | 11th Gaon Chart Music Awards | With Sieun and Doyoung | |
| 2022 | 1st Blue Dragon Series Awards | The Red Carpet event | |

== Awards and nominations ==
Name of the award ceremony, year presented, category, nominee of the award, and the result of the nomination
| Award ceremony | Year | Category | Nominee / Work | Result | Ref. |
|---|---|---|---|---|---|
| Baeksang Arts Awards | 2021 | Best Variety Performer – Female | Long Live Independence; Girls' High School Mystery Class | Nominated | |
| Blue Dragon Series Awards | 2022 | Best Female Entertainer | Girls High School Mystery Class | Nominated | |
| Brand of the Year Awards | 2020 | Program of the Year – Web Entertainment | MMTG | Won | |
