= 10 Out of 10 (2PM song) =

Single by 2PM

from the album 01:59PM
- B-side: "Only You"; "Angel"
- Released: August 29, 2008
- Recorded: 2008
- Genre: K-pop; R&B; Hip-hop
- Length: 3:22
- Label: JYP
- Songwriter: Park Jin-young
- Producer: Park Jin-young

2PM singles chronology
"10 Out of 10" (2008)	"Only You (Winter Special)" (2008)

2PM chronology
Hottest Time of the Day (2008)	2:00PM Time for Change (2009)

Music video
- "10 Out of 10" on YouTube "10 Out of 10" (For Fans) B-side ver. on YouTube "10 Out of 10" (Old School ver.) on YouTube

"10 Out of 10" (Korean: 10점 만점에 10점; RR: Sipjeom manjeome sipjeom) is the debut single by South Korean boy band 2PM. It is the lead single of the group's debut single album, Hottest Time of the Day, released on August 29, 2008 via JYP Entertainment.

== Background ==
"10 Out of 10" is a hip-hop song composed and written by Park Jin-young, running 3 minutes and 27 seconds in length. The song is about an attractive woman, who is considered a "10 out of 10". The song describes various aspects of her that are considered "10 points".

As 2PM's debut track, the song was composed with the intent to showcase a unique side to the group contrasting with other boy groups at the time. The choreography of the song incorporates acrobatics and breakdancing, hallmarks of 2PM's early signature style. The group made their debut live performance on September 4, 2008 with a performance of the song on Mnet's music program M Countdown.

The track would later be included in 2PM's first studio album, 01:59PM, released on November 10, 2009. Another version of the song was recorded without former 2PM member Jaebeom's vocals to be included in the 2012 compilation album 2PM Member's Selection.

== Music video ==
The teaser for the music video was released on August 26, 2008. The music video, directed by Jang Jae-hyuk, was released on August 29 on South Korean music websites.

The video starts with a woman, played by G.NA, pulling up and exiting a car. She walks through a building, and the members of 2PM stare at her as she walks by. The remainder of the video intersperses scenes of the group dancing with scenes showing their interest in the woman. The dancing scenes take place in a reflective stage, with a crystal-like background.

Some scenes use humor to illustrate the band's fantasies or delusions about the woman. For example, at one point Wooyoung is initially eating whipped cream off the woman's finger; however, a later scene shows the owner of the finger to actually be Jun. K. Another scene shows Junho playing with Taecyeon at the pool, until he realizes Taecyeon is not the woman. Near the end of the video, the members of 2PM look on with disappointment as the woman walks away with a different man, possibly her boyfriend. The end of the video features a cameo by labelmate and Wonder Girls member Yubin, whom the members of 2PM begin chasing after.

Another music video filmed in a white set showcasing the choreography of the song was released on October 13, 2008. A similar music video was released for an alternate mix of the song, titled the "Old School" version, on the same date.

== Charts ==
"10 Out of 10" was described as a hit song, charting on the September 2008 issue of the MIAK monthly albums chart at number 36 with a sales total of 6,332 copies for the month. This was the final MIAK album chart issue released, before it was replaced by the Gaon Album Chart starting in January 2010. "10 Out of 10" also peaked at number 8 on the Melon Weekly Chart and at number 60 on the 2008 Melon Yearly Chart. In 2009, following the release of the song's music video in Thailand, "10 Out of 10" topped various Thai music charts such as the MTV Thailand International Chart.

Monthly charts
Chart (September 2008)	Peak position
South Korean Albums (MIAK)	36

== Track listing ==
All editions track listing
No.	Title	Writer(s)	Arrangements	Length
1.	"10 Out of 10" (Korean: 10점 만점에 10점; RR: Sipjeom manjeome sipjeom)	Park Jin-young	The Asiansoul; Rainstone	3:22
2.	"Only You"	Park Jin-young		3:58
3.	"Angel"	Kwon Tae-eun, Park Jang-geun		3:54
4.	"10 Out of 10" (Old School ver.)	Park Jin-young	The Asiansoul; Rainstone	3:17
5.	"10 Out of 10" (instrumental)	Park Jin-young	The Asiansoul; Rainstone	3:23
6.	"Only You" (instrumental)	Park Jin-young		3:58
Total length:				21:52

== Release history ==
Release history and formats
Region	Date	Format(s)	Ref.
Various	August 29, 2008	Digital download	
South Korea	September 4, 2008	CD single	

== Accolades ==
Awards and nominations for "10 Out of 10"
Year	Organization	Award	Result	Ref.
2008	Cyworld Digital Music Awards	Rookie of the Month (September)	Won	
2008	Mnet Asian Music Awards	Best New Male Artist	Nominated	
