= Promise (I'll Be) =

- Japanese single cover

Single by 2PM

from the album Gentlemen's Game
- B-side: "Wow"; "Mayday"
- Released: September 13, 2016; October 26, 2016 (Japan)
- Recorded: 2016
- Genre: K-pop; J-pop; Contemporary R&B; Synth-pop
- Length: 3:28; 3:29 (Japan)
- Label: JYP; Epic Records Japan
- Songwriters: Taecyeon; Lesley Chiang; Raphael
- Producers: Lesley Chiang; Raphael

2PM singles chronology
"Higher" (2015)	"Promise (I'll Be)" (2016)	"Make It" (2021)

Music video
- "Promise (I'll Be)" on YouTube

"Promise (I'll Be)" is a song recorded by South Korean boy group 2PM as the lead single for their sixth Korean studio album, Gentlemen's Game, released by JYP Entertainment on September 13, 2016.

A Japanese version of the song with the same title was released as the group's eleventh Japanese single by Epic Records Japan on October 26, 2016. The single was certified Gold by the Recording Industry Association of Japan. It was 2PM's final release before the group went on hiatus due to mandatory military service.

== Background and release ==
Following the group's eighth anniversary on September 4, 2016, individual teaser photos for the group's Korean comeback were released from September 5–8. A music video teaser and a choreography teaser were uploaded on September 9 and September 11, respectively. The music video for "Promise (I'll Be)" was released on YouTube on September 13, 2016, along with the rest of 2PM's Korean album, Gentleman's Game. On the same day of the album's release, 2PM member Taecyeon announced that it would be the group's final Korean music release prior to the group going on hiatus due to its members enlisting in the South Korean military.

A Japanese-language version of "Promise (I'll Be)", was released on October 26, 2016, in the lead up to their The 2PM in Tokyo Dome concerts on October 26–27, the group's final concerts in Japan prior to their hiatus. The single was released in eight versions: a regular edition, a CD+DVD edition, and six individual member versions that include a member's logo stamp sticker and an instrumental version of "Promise (I'll Be)" as a bonus track. The single was the group's final Japanese music release prior to the group's hiatus.

== Composition ==
"Promise (I'll Be)" is a contemporary R&B and synth-pop song written and composed by 2PM member Taecyeon, Hong Kong singer-songwriter Lesley Chiang, and producer Raphael, who previously worked on several of 2PM's songs. The song incorporates elements of future bass, big band, and urban contemporary music, featuring piano instrumentals and a pulsating synth beat. The song's lyrics are about a man who promises to always be available for his lover.

The B-side tracks of the Japanese version of "Promise (I'll Be)" are the Japanese-language songs "Wow", co-written by 2PM member Junho, and "Mayday", co-written by 2PM member Chansung.

== Music video ==
The music video consists of shots of each member individually, dressed in suits and located in settings such as Kyung Hee University's Grand Peace Palace. Writer Kaori Simon for Real Sound noted the mature and sexually provocative nature of the music video, particularly scenes of member Jun. K laying with a woman, played by actress Kim Ji-eun, in bed, describing it as "something only [2PM], with their increased age, could pull off". The music video was the eighth most viewed K-pop music video on YouTube in the United States and the ninth most viewed K-pop music video on YouTube globally in September 2016.

== Promotion ==
In promotion of "Promise (I'll Be)", 2PM hosted the September 10, 2016 episode of the eighth season of Saturday Night Live Korea, where they performed an abridged version of the song live, prior to the song's official release. In the hour leading up to the release Gentleman's Game, 2PM held a live premiere event via V Live+ on September 12, 2016, where they performed songs from Gentleman's Game including "Promise (I'll Be)". The group then performed the song for two weeks on Korean television music programs, starting with the September 22, 2016 episode of M Countdown. 2PM also performed "Promise (I'll Be)" on the October 1, 2016 episode of You Hee-yeol's Sketchbook and the KNTV 20th & DATV 7th Anniversary Live 2016 at Yokohama Arena in Japan on October 1, 2016.

2PM first performed the Japanese version of "Promise (I'll Be)" at their The 2PM in Tokyo Dome concerts on October 26–27, 2016. The group held a "Hi Touch" event for the release of their single at Makuhari Messe on October 30, 2016. In November 2016, 2PM were featured on the cover of the Japanese fashion magazine Baila, becoming the first men to do so; the issue included sixty pages of photos and interviews of the group and testimonies from other celebrities about 2PM.

== Commercial performance ==
"Promise (I'll Be)" was generally more successful in Japan than in South Korea; the song topped the Oricon Daily Chart and charted on the Oricon Singles Chart for four weeks, peaking at number two, in contrast to in South Korea, where it charted on the Gaon Singles Chart for just one week and peaked at number 61. The song also charted internationally, reaching number 11 on Billboard's World Digital Songs chart and topping various K-pop charts in China such as KuGou's new Korean songs chart and YinYueTai's Korean music video chart. The Japanese version of "Promise (I'll Be)" was certified Gold by the Recording Industry Association of Japan in November 2016 for selling over 100,000 copies.

== Track listing ==
CD+DVD and CD-only track listing
No.	Title	Lyrics	Music	Mixer	Length
1.	"Promise (I'll Be)" (Japanese ver.)	Taecyeon; Lesley Chiang; Raphael	Taecyeon; Chiang; Raphael	Chiang; Raphael	3:29
2.	"Wow"	Junho; Hong Ji-sang; Yu-ki Kokubo	Junho; Hong; Kokubo	Hong; Kokubo	3:17
3.	"Mayday"	Chansung; Super Changddai; Shoko Fujibayashi	Chansung; Super Changddai; Shoko	Super Changddai	3:50
Total length:					10:36

Bonus track (press limited edition B–G only)
No.	Title	Music	Mixer	Length
4.	"Promise (I'll Be)" (Japanese ver., without main vocal)	Taecyeon; Chiang; Raphael	Chiang; Raphael	3:29
Total length:				14:25

DVD (press limited edition A)
No.	Title	Length
1.	"Promise (I'll Be) (Japanese ver.) (music video)"
2.	"Promise (I'll Be) Making Movie"

== Charts ==
=== Weekly charts ===
Weekly chart performance for "Promise (I'll Be)"
Chart (2016)	Peak position
South Korea (Gaon)	61
US World Digital Songs (Billboard)	11

Weekly chart performance for "Promise (I'll Be)" (Japanese ver.)
Chart (2016)	Peak position
Japan (Oricon)	2
Japan (Billboard Japan Hot 100)	4

== Sales ==
Country	Sales
South Korea (digital)	31,568
Japan (physical)	101,106

== Release history ==
Release history for "Go Crazy!"
Region	Date	Format	Label
Various	September 13, 2016	Digital download	JYP
Japan	October 26, 2016	CD, CD + DVD, Digital download	Epic Records Japan
