= Idol Show =

South Korean television series

Idol Show (Korean: 아이돌 군단의 떴다! 그녀), is a South Korean variety show starring idol singers as both MCs and weekly guests. The show aired for 5 seasons, from 2008 to 2010, on MBC every1.

== Hosts ==
Season	Main host	Co-hosts	Ref
1	Super Junior-H	Roo'ra's Go Young-wook, Click-B's Kim Sang-hyuk (Episode 1-5), Jang Dong-min (Episode 2 onwards)	
2	F.T. Island	Jang Dong-min	
3	2PM	Boom	
4	Kara	Boom	
5	MBLAQ	Shin Bong-sun, Jung Ju-ri	

== Idol guest stars ==
=== Season 1 ===
First aired: July 10, 2008

- Episode 1 - Jewelry
- Episode 2 - without Super Junior F.T. Island & Brown Eyed Girls
- Episode 3 & 4 - Wonder Girls
- Episode 5 - Kara
- Episode 6 - Roo'ra
- Episode 7 - Baby Vox Re.V
- Episode 8 - 2AM
- Episode 9 & 10 - Han Seung-yeon, Goo Hara, Joo, Moon Ji Eun, Lim So Young
- Episode 11 - Kim Na Young, Chun Ja, Han Young
- Episode 12 - Kim Na Young, Seulong (2AM), Lim So Young
- Episode 13 & 14 (finale) - Lee Chung Ah

=== Season 2 ===
First aired: October 16, 2008

- Episode 1 & 2 - Younha
- Episode 3 & 4 - 2PM, Hwangbo, Baek Boram
- Episode 5
- Episode 6 & 7 (finale)- Kim Na Young, Kim Sang Mi, Min Ji, Choi Eun Joo, Jamilla

=== Season 3 ===
First aired: December 4, 2008

- Episode 1 - None
- Episode 2 - Kara, Hwang Hyun Hee
- Episode 3 - High school girls and Ulzzang noonas
- Episode 4 - 2AM, Jang Young Ran, Go Young-wook (Roo'ra)
- Episode 5 - Brown Eyed Girls, Jang Young Ran, Go Young-wook (Roo'ra)
- Episode 6 - Foreign girls
- Episode 7 - None (Public recognition special)
- Episode 8 & 9 - Girls' Generation
- Episode 10 - Going to MT
- Episode 11 - High school girls and friends
- Episode 12 - College girls
- Episode 13 - Black Pearl, Jung Ju-ri, Yoo Chae-yeong, Baek Boram, Kim Jung-min, Jin Bora (Star Golden Bell Special)
- Episode 14 & 15 - SHINee
- Episode 16 - After School
- Episode 17 (finale)

=== Season 4 ===
First aired: April 2, 2009

- Episode 1 - none
- Episode 2 - Daesung
- Episode 3 - Lee Chun-hee
- Episode 4 - F.T. Island
- Episode 5 (finale) - 2AM

=== Season 5 ===
First aired: December 16, 2009

- Episode 1 - Kwon JiHye
- Episode 2 - Secret
- Episode 3 - T-ara
- Episode 4 - Kim Na Young, Kim Sae Rom, Kang Ye Bin
- Episode 5 - None (Queen Seondeok Parody/Lee Joon's Hidden Camera)
- Episode 6 - Soo Jung (Star Golden Bell)
- Episode 7 & 8 - After School
- Episode 9 - none
- Episode 10 - MBLAQ (Ski Resort Special)
- Episode 11 - IU, Kim Eun Jung (Jewelry), Ha Joo Yeon (Jewelry), Hong Jin Young
- Episode 12 - Transfer Girls
- Episode 13 & 14 - Sulli
- Episode 15 - MBLAQ (Health Check-up)
- Episode 16 - (finale)
