= Dongseongno Festival =

Festival in Daegu, South Korea

Coordinates: 35.869086°N 128.595834°E

- Begins: May
- Ends: May
- Frequency: Yearly
- Locations: Daegu Jung-gu, South Korea
- Years active: 22

- Dongseongno Festival
- Hangul: 동성로축제
- Hanja: 東城路祝祭
- Revised Romanization: Dongseongno Chukje
- McCune–Reischauer: Tongsŏngno Ch'ukche

The Dongseongno Festival is a festival held in Daegu Jung-gu, South Korea. The festival is held every May and includes a song festival, a fashion show, and concerts.

The Dongsang-ro Festival, which opened its doors in May 1990, is festival led by the pure private sector. The festival is a leading business district in Korea and will be the venue for the festival to showcase the excellence of culture with people around the world in Daegu Youth Street.

== See also ==
- List of music festivals in South Korea

== See also ==
- List of festivals in South Korea
- List of festivals in Asia
