= My House (2PM song) =

2015 single by 2PM

Single by 2PM

from the album No.5
- Released: June 15, 2015
- Recorded: 2015
- Genre: K-pop; Synth-pop; Contemporary R&B
- Length: 3:08
- Label: JYP
- Songwriters: Jun. K; Lel
- Producers: Jun. K; Lel

2PM singles chronology
"Guilty Love" (2015)	"My House" (2015)	"Higher" (2015)

Music video
- "My House" on YouTube "My House" (Japanese ver.) on YouTube

"My House" (Korean: 우리집; RR: Urijip; lit. 'Our House') is a song recorded by South Korean boy group 2PM as the lead single for their fifth Korean studio album, No.5. It was released by JYP Entertainment on June 15, 2015. Although the song was moderately successful upon release, it became a sleeper hit upon suddenly going viral in 2020.

Professional ratings
Review scores
Source	Rating
IZM	2.5/5 stars

== Composition ==
"My House" is a synth-pop and contemporary R&B track about the intense attraction to a woman, featuring a prominent triplet swing rhythm and a mix of acoustic guitar and electronic sounds. The song is written and composed by 2PM member Jun. K and producer Lel. It is composed in the key F-sharp minor and has 176 beats per minute and a running time of 3 minutes and 08 seconds.

A Japanese version of the song and its music video were released as a B-side for 2PM's single "Higher" on October 21, 2015. An acoustic version of the song with a new jazz-inspired arrangement was included in 2PM's seventh Korean studio album, Must (2021). A Japanese version of the acoustic version was later included in 2PM's Japanese EP, With Me Again (2021).

== Music video ==
The release of the music video for "My House" and the album No.5 was delayed by two weeks after initially-contracted video production company, Dextor Lab, unexpectedly pulled out of the production for the group's music video, resulting in JYP Entertainment taking legal action against the company. On May 13, JYP announced that they would be working with Naive Creative Productions for the music video. The video, starring actress and beauty pageant titleholder Kim Yu-mi, was released on June 15, 2015 and was inspired by European fairy tales such as "Snow White", "Little Red Riding Hood", and "Beauty and the Beast", and the play Romeo and Juliet. Set in a luxurious setting hosting a ball, Kim plays a girl who is trying to flee the party at midnight, but is seduced by each member in individual scenes, ending with her taking off a shoe and intentionally leaving it at the scene in an homage to "Cinderella".

The choreography for "My House" includes various hook dance moves such as one that emulates grabbing a lover by the hand.

== Promotion ==
2PM held a livestream titled "2PM is Coming to My House!" (Korean: 2PM이 우리집으로 온다!; RR: 2PMi urijibeuro onda!) via Naver Starcast On Air on the same date as the release of the album, June 15, 2015, in which they showcased several tracks from the album including "My House". They then held comeback stages for the song on Mnet's M Countdown on June 18, KBS's Music Bank on June 19, MBC's Show! Music Core on June 20, SBS's Inkigayo on June 21, and SBS M's The Show on June 23. The group ended promotions after just one week in order to focus on their concert titled House Party in Seoul on June 27–28.

In promotion of "My House", 2PM starred in Melon's radio show web series Oven Radio from June 15–20, 2015. The group also appeared on the July 1, 2015 episode of MV Bank Stardust 2 and the July 19, 2015 “Come to My House” special episode of Running Man.

== Reception and legacy ==
Billboard compared the song positively to labelmates Miss A's 2015 single "Only You", complimenting the "suave choreography". Music critic Kim Do-heon of IZM praised the song's flow and composition, but criticized the song for playing things too safe.

In early 2020, the music video and performance footage of "My House", particularly footage of member Junho, suddenly went viral on YouTube, causing the song to reenter various music streaming charts and spawn dance challenge videos. As a result, following the members' discharge from mandatory military service, 2PM made their first performance together as a full group since 2017 with "My House" on MMTG's "Songs that Deserve a Comeback" Concert special broadcast on SBS on June 11, 2021. According to MMTG producer Hong Min-ji, the recent success of "My House" in 2020 was the inspiration for the concept of the concert.

The song has retroactively become one of 2PM's most well-known songs, which music critic Kim Yoon-ha attributes to its showcasing of the group's maturation in image from "beast idols" to "subtle sexiness", which was able to attract "a new fandom".

== Charts ==
=== Weekly charts ===
Chart (2015)	Peak position
South Korea (Gaon)	7
US World Digital Songs (Billboard)	7

=== Monthly charts ===
Chart (June 2015)	Peak position
South Korea (Gaon)	29

== Accolades ==
Music program awards
Program	Date	Ref.
The Show	June 23, 2015	

== Sales ==
Country	Sales
South Korea (digital)	298,275

== Release history ==
Release history for "My House"
Region	Date	Format	Label
Various	May 15, 2015	Digital download	JYP
