= Jun. K =

South Korean singer

- 김민준
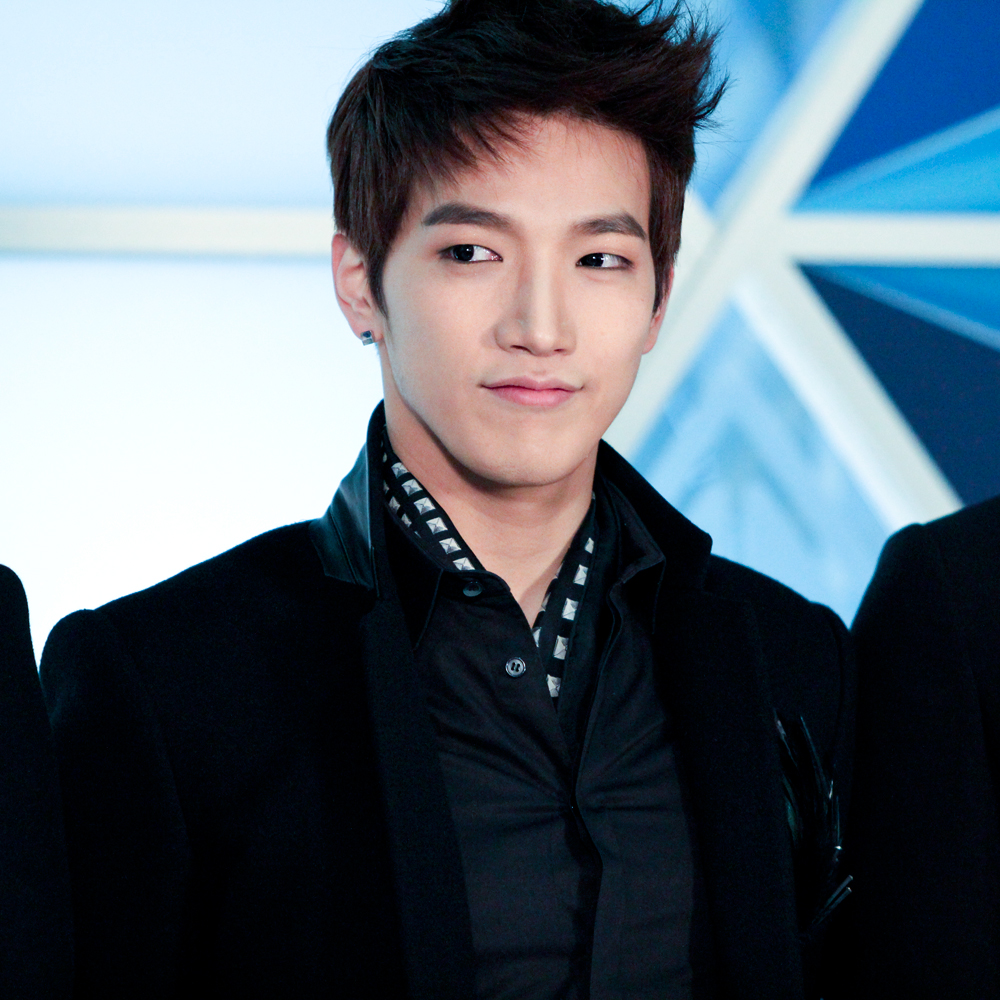
- Jun. K in 2012
- Born: Kim Jun-su; January 15, 1988 (age 38); Daegu, South Korea
- Education: Dong-ah Institute of Media and Arts (BA); Kyunghee University (MA)
- Occupations: Singer-songwriter; rapper; record producer; actor
- Musical career
- Genres: K-pop; J-pop; R&B; hip-hop; soul; jazz
- Instrument: Vocals
- Years active: 2008–present
- Label: JYP
- Member of: 2PM; JYP Nation
- Website: 2pm.jype.com

Korean name
- Hangul: 김민준
- Hanja: 金閔俊
- RR: Gim Minjun
- MR: Kim Minjun

Signature
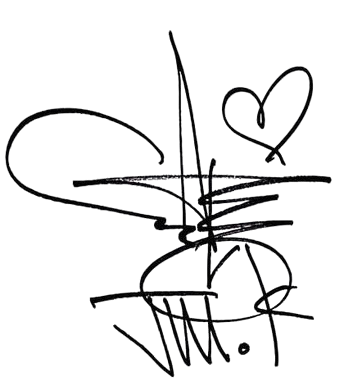

Kim Min-jun (Korean: 김민준; Hanja: 金閔俊; born January 15, 1988), known professionally as Jun. K (준케이), is a South Korean singer-songwriter, rapper, record producer, and actor. He is the main vocalist of 2PM, a boy band currently managed by JYP Entertainment, and he has written and composed several of the group's songs, including "Go Crazy!", "My House", and "With Me Again". Formerly known as Kim Jun-su (Korean: 김준수), he revealed on October 17, 2012, that due to family reasons, he would be changing his name to Min-jun, though his stage name would remain the same.

Aside from his group activities, Jun. K has released five EPs in South Korea and six EPs and one compilation album in Japan. His first three Japanese albums peaked at number two on the Oricon Weekly Albums Chart. His second Japanese album Love Letter ranked number one on both Billboard Japan's Top and Hot Albums charts. His first Korean album, Mr. NO♡, debuted at number nine on Billboard World Albums chart. His third Japanese album No Shadow ranked number two on Billboard Japan Top and Hot Albums charts. His fourth Japanese album No Time ranked number three on the Oricon Daily Albums Chart.

== Early life ==
The older of two sons, Jun. K was born and raised in Daegu, South Korea. He enjoyed music and composing since his middle school days and dreamed of becoming a singer. His parents were initially against this idea, but they changed their minds after he won prizes at the Dongseongno Festival (동성로축제) as a high school freshman.

He originally auditioned for YG Entertainment and first met G-Dragon and Taeyang of BigBang, both of whom remain his close friends. He was accepted into both YG Entertainment and JYP Entertainment, choosing to join the latter and moving to Seoul in 2004. Alongside former member Jay Park, he had the longest training period of all the 2PM members; his debut was cancelled several times prior to his participation in the survival program Hot Blooded Men.

== Career ==
=== 2008–2010: Debut with 2PM and solo activities ===
In 2008, he participated in Mnet's Hot Blooded Men, a program that chronicles the rigorous training of thirteen aspiring trainees, all vying for a coveted spot in the boy band One Day. This initiative ultimately led to the formation of two distinct boy bands, namely 2AM and 2PM.

Half a year following the televised airing of Hot Blooded Men, the group 2PM made their debut with the release of their inaugural single "10 Out of 10" from their first single album titled Hottest Time of the Day. However, it was their second single album, 2:00PM Time For Change, that propelled them to mainstream success in Korean music, solidifying their meteoric rise. As of 2021, the group has released seven studio albums in Korea and five studio albums in Japan.

During a 2PM fan meeting in 2009, he performed his composition "Hot" for the first time for his solo. "Hot" was later recorded by all six members and included on their second studio album Hands Up (2011). In 2010, he collaborated with composer Jung Woo on the track "Tok Tok Tok" released in August, provided guest vocals for then-labelmate San E's song "B.U.B.U." (an acronym for "Break Up Back Up"), released in September as part of his first extended play, and collaborated with other idols and singers for the 2010 G20 Seoul summit campaign song "Let's Go," released in October.

=== 2011–2013: Solo debut and theatrical debut ===
On October 7, 2011, Jun. K released his debut single "Alive". The accompanying music video was uploaded to 2PM's official YouTube channel three days later. The song quickly climbed the charts and became number one on Cyworld. On March 14, 2012, it was released as a ringtone on Japan's Recochoku ahead of 2PM's compilation album 2PM Best: 2008–2011 in Korea, where it could also be found as a bonus track in Limited Edition B. "Alive" managed to quickly rank in at number one on the daily chart. Following this, JYP Entertainment stated that the song "shows a deeper look into Jun. K's unique musical world. It has a smooth beat that reveals a new charm to the singer." He also recorded "Love... Goodbye" for the soundtrack of the Korean drama I Love Lee Tae-ri. It served as the male lead's theme.

Jun. K began his acting career in 2013 with the role of D'Artagnan in the musical The Three Musketeers. Also in 2013, he played the role of Daniel in the musical Jack the Ripper. In December 2013, he returned to his role of D'Artagnan in the musical The Three Musketeers performed in Tokyo, Japan.

=== 2014–present: Solo activities ===
In an interview with The Star in 2014, Jun. K revealed that Oricon's editor-in-chief had said Love and Hate was the number one album released in Japan that year and expressed his gratitude: "When I heard this I felt even better. I have really worked hard without any rest since December last year. I tried my best to prepare it, but I'm really thankful to everyone who helped me achieve this good result, and everyone who congratulated me."

Jun. K's Love & Hate concert tour ranked in the top 10 best concerts in Japan by Ranking Box, for having one of the most impressive live concerts of 2014, making him the only K-pop artist on the list. The editor-in-chief stated, "The album I personally listened to the most this year is Jun.K's solo album, 'Love & Hate', which was released in May. He's an artist who has an outstanding ability as a singer-songwriter, impressive voice tone, and musical talent. His solo live concert was rich with not only lyrical music but expressiveness as well."

On June 11, 2014, Jun. K released the Korean version of "No Love". Another song from the Japanese EP, titled "Mr. Doctor", was featured on HOT 97's DJ LEAD's Mix Album twice, in 2014 and 2015.

Jun. K's second Japanese album, Love Letter, was released on November 25, 2015, and quickly reached number one on the Oricon Daily Albums Chart and on Japan's Billboard charts for top album sales. On December 30, 2015, the Korean version of Love Letter was released.

In July 2016, Jun. K announced the release of his first Korean mini album, Mr. No♡, digitally on August 9 and physically on August 11. He held a showcase on August 8 before releasing his album and the showcase also aired on Naver's V app.

Jun. K's third Japanese album, No Shadow, was released on December 14, 2016, and reached number one on the Daily Albums Chart and number two on the Oricon Weekly Album Chart and Japan's Billboard charts for top and hot album sales.

On January 4, 2017, Jun. K released a surprise music video for his song "Your Wedding", for his return as a solo artist in Korea. The music video stars his bandmate Nichkhun and Twice's Nayeon. "Your Wedding" was a pre-release for Jun. K's self-composed album titled 77-1X3-00, which was released on January 12, 2017, along with the music video for its title track, a Korean version of his song "No Shadow".

Jun. K's second concert tour, Love Letter, and third concert tour, No Shadow, ranked in Yahoo Japan's 2015 and 2016 "Top 10+1 Best Concerts in Japan" respectively, making him the only K-pop artist on the lists.

On November 27, 2017, Jun. K released his second Korean mini-album My 20's as his final project in Korea before his mandatory military enlistment. The album includes songs Jun. K personally composed and wrote, including the title track "Moving Day".

Jun. K's fourth Japanese album, No Time, was released on April 4, 2018, as the final project in Japan before his army enlistment. No Time debuted at number three on the Oricon Daily Albums Chart.

Jun. K’s fourth Korean single and first Japanese digital single “This Is Not A Song, 1929” was released in both Korea and Japan simultaneously on June 10, 2020. On the same day, he carried out a free online concert, This Is Not a Special Live, for his fans to show his gratitude towards their continued support.

On December 9, 2020, Jun. K released his third Korean mini album 20 Minutes, with the title track "30 Minutes Might Be Too Long".

On March 10, 2021, Jun. K released his fifth Japanese album, This Is Not a Song.

In July 2022, it was announced that Jun. K would hold a fan meeting titled Jun. K (From 2PM) 2022 Fan Meeting "We, Love On, Again" in Japan on September 3.

== Personal life ==
Jun. K speaks Korean, English, and Japanese. His hobbies include composing, fashion, and collecting accessories and shoes. His specialities are singing and writing themes.

On February 24, 2011, he was admitted into the bachelor program for Performing Arts at the Dong-Ah Institute of Media and Arts, starting his new semester as a fourth-year student. Before singing, he had entered and won various poem and songwriting contests. He attended Kyung Hee University's Media Information Graduate School for his master's degree.

On October 17, 2012, he announced that he would be legally changing his name from Kim Jun-su to Kim Min-jun due to family reasons. In a 2014 interview with Starcast, he discussed the change: "There are still hateful comments about me changing my name. It is a name which my father gave to me in advance before he passed away after thinking about when to give it to me. I talked about it for 8 months with my mother. I thought about it for a long time since changing my name didn't feel good to me." He had previously used Jun. K only in his composing credits and began using it publicly as his stage name after the legal name change.

On February 10, 2018, Jun. K was discovered to have been driving under the influence of alcohol at a sobriety checkpoint that was set up at the intersection near Sinsa Station. He was reported to have been indicted without physical detention as he had a blood alcohol content level of 0.074 per cent. Jun. K personally apologized for his recent drunk driving incident, resulting in him not joining his fellow 2PM members on stage for the 2018 Pyeongchang Winter Olympics Headliner Show.

=== Military service ===
Jun. K joined the Nodo Training Centre, 2nd Infantry Division of 1st ROK Army, in Gangwon-do Yanggu to fulfil his mandatory military service on May 8, 2018. He received a silver medal with an honourable mention from the commander of the division for his outstanding performance as a trainee at the training camp graduation ceremony. After completing the training session successfully, Jun. K was assigned to a military band as a saxophone player and a singer.

On May 31, 2019, Jun. K received the status of "Special Class Warrior", which is only awarded to soldiers who excel in shooting, physical endurance, first aid, vigilance, CBR training, mental endurance, and combat skills. Jun. K completed his military service and was discharged on January 2, 2020.

== Filmography ==
=== Variety and reality shows ===
Year	Title	Role	Notes	Ref.
2011–2014	Immortal Songs 2	Contestant	Episodes 4–7, 60, 141–142	
2012	The Romantic & Idol	Main cast		
2014	Experience the Real Thailand	Main cast	with Nichkhun	
2016	King of Mask Singer	Contestant	Dream of the Square (Episodes 43–44)	
2021	Idol Live Agent	Idol cast	Episodes 1–4	
2021–2022	Adola School Homecoming Day	Host	with Lee Gi-kwang	
2022	Adola School 3: PR on Idol	Host	with Lee Gi-kwang	
2022	King of Mask Singer	Contestant	Orangutan (Episode 355)	
2022	Seven Stars	Producer	Thai audition program	
2023	K-Pop Generation	Interviewee	with Nichkhun, Jang Wooyoung, and Hwang Chan-sung	

=== Music videos ===
Year	Title
2011	"Alive"
2014	"No Love"
2014	"Love & Hate"
2014	"True Swag Part 2"
2014	"No Love" (Korean ver.)
2015	"Everest"
2015	"Love Letter" (Japanese ver.)
2015	"Love Letter" (Korean ver.)
2016	"Think About You"
2016	"Young Forever"
2016	"No Shadow" (Japanese ver.)
2016	"Think About You" (Japanese ver.)
2016	"Young Forever" (Japanese ver.)
2017	"Your Wedding"
2017	"No Shadow" (Korean ver.)
2017	"Moving Day"
2018	"Ms. No Time"
2018	"Moving Day" (Japanese ver.)
2020	"This Is Not A Song, 1929"
2020	"This Is Not A Song, 1929" (Japanese ver.)
2020	"30 Minutes Might Be Too Long"
2021	"Hide and Seek, 1995"
2023	"Command C+Me"
2024	"Paint This Love"
2025	"Automatic"
2025	"R&B Me" (feat. Changbin (Stray Kids))
2025	"Privacy"
2026	"Midnight Ticket"

== Theater ==
Year	Title	Role	Notes	Ref.
2013–2014	The Three Musketeers	D'Artagnan	Lead role	
2013	Jack the Ripper	Daniel	Lead role	
2021–2022	Theatrical Boy Radio ONAIR	DJ	Main Role	
2022	Equal	Theo	Lead role	
2022	On Air	DJ		
