= Make It (2PM song) =

2021 single by 2PM

Single by 2PM

from the album Must
- Released: June 28, 2021
- Recorded: 2021
- Genre: K-pop; Dance-pop; Contemporary R&B
- Length: 2:59
- Label: JYP
- Songwriters: Jang Wooyoung; Hotsauce
- Producers: Jang Wooyoung; Hotsauce

2PM singles chronology
"Promise (I'll Be)" (2016)	"Make It" (2021)	"With Me Again" (2021)

Music video
- "Make It" on YouTube

"Make It" (Korean: 해야 해; RR: Haeya hae; lit. 'Do it') is a song recorded by South Korean boy group 2PM as the lead single for their seventh Korean studio album, Must. It was released by JYP Entertainment on June 28, 2021.

== Background and release ==
On June 7, 2021, JYP Entertainment announced that 2PM would make a comeback after five years through a comeback trailer though JYP Entertainment social media accounts. Between June 16 to June 21, concept photos of each member was posted on 2PM's social media, and on June 23, group teaser photos were released. On June 28, 2021, 2PM released both Must and the music video for "Make It".

== Composition ==
"Make It" is written and composed by 2PM member Jang Wooyoung and producer Hotsauce. The song is composed in the key C-sharp minor and has 93 beats per minute and a running time of 2 minutes and 59 seconds. The song incorporates elements from jazz and soul, opening with a retro guitar riff and featuring classic string bass and synth.

I started my work by asking myself two questions ― what should I say if I get to meet my true love and what should I do if 2PM has to make its comeback right now?

— Wooyoung on the inspiration behind the song.

== Promotion ==
2PM first performed "Make It" on a TV comeback special titled Must, which aired on the cable channel Mnet and the digital channel M2 an hour after the release of "Make It" and Must. They performed "Make It" on Korean television music programs for two weeks, starting with M Countdown on July 1, 2021.

== Music video ==
The music video, directed by Naive Creative Production, shows a meteor that comes crashing onto Earth, destroying everything. However, instead of running for their lives, the members become captivated by a beautiful woman (Kim Ji-yoon) and ignore the dangers around them. The end of the music video reveals that the events of the video took place as a dream. The music video achieved 10 million views on YouTube in just two days.

A choreography video for the song was uploaded on July 8, 2021. The choreography of "Make It" features a point move of rolling up one's sleeves, which received particular attention.

== Charts ==
=== Weekly charts ===
Chart (2021)	Peak position
South Korea (Gaon)	39
South Korea (K-pop Hot 100)	81
US World Digital Songs (Billboard)	20

=== Monthly charts ===
Chart (July 2021)	Peak position
South Korea (Gaon)	80

== Release history ==
Release history for "Make It"
Region	Date	Format	Label
Various	June 28, 2021	Digital download; streaming	JYP
