= MMTG (web series) =

- Genre: Web series / Variety show
- Presented by: Jaejae
- Country of origin: South Korea
- Original language: Korean

Production
- Production company: SBS Mobidic

Original release
- Network: YouTube
- Release: February 15, 2018 – present

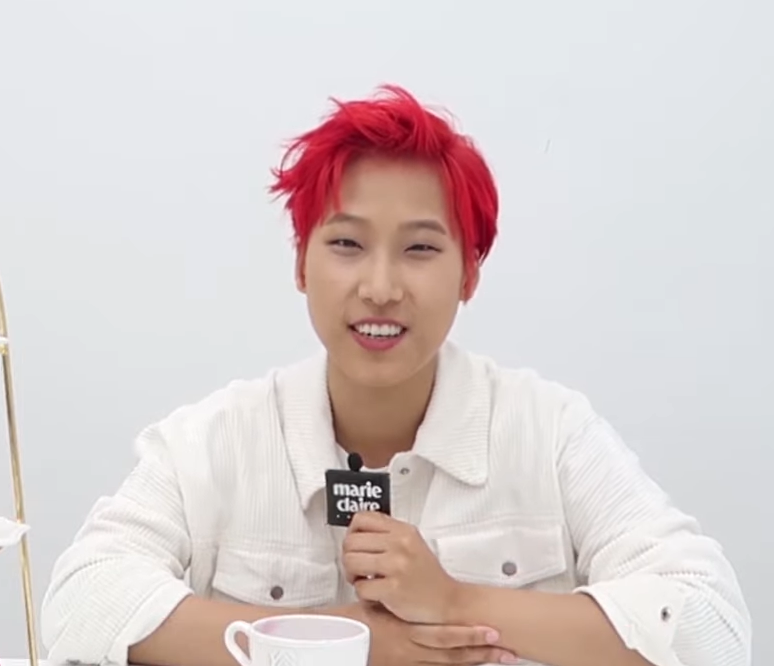
JaeJae during a Marie Claire Korea interview (2019)

MMTG (Korean: 문명특급; RR: Munmyeongteukgeup) is a South Korean web variety series produced by SBS Mobidic and hosted by Jaejae. The program, aired since 2018, features interviews with K-pop idols, actors, and public figures, along with themed segments such as "Civilization Express Rediscovery", which revisits past pop culture content. Since its launch, the show has contributed to the resurgence of several songs and trends within Korean popular culture.

== Format ==
MMTG features a flexible interview-based format, with MC Jaejae conducting conversations with figures from various sectors of Korean popular culture, including K-pop idols, actors, and cultural creatives. Recurring segments include "Civilization Express Rediscovery", in which Jaejae and her guests revisit older pop culture works or hit songs. MMTG has also conducted English-language interviews with western celebrities such as the casts of Wicked, Deadpool & Wolverine, and The Devil Wears Prada 2.

== History ==
The program originally began as Civilization Express (문명특급) under SBS’s digital news lab division. In early 2024, the show rebranded to MMTG. One example of a major project under this new format was the "2009 Classic Song Championship" (2009 명곡 챔피언십), which invited K-pop fans from over 24 countries to vote on the best songs of 2009. The "2009 Championship" was later aired on SBS TV, indicating the show's growing influence. Another notable project was a series of episodes documenting the formation of the mixed-gender group JaeJae × Gabi × Seungheon (also known as Jaessbee) and their journey of making music together.

== Impact ==
MMTG has played a significant role in bringing renewed attention to older K-pop hits, helping revive songs and creating new cultural conversations around them. In 2020 and 2021, due to the COVID-19 pandemic in South Korea, MMTG hosted virtual concerts featuring performances by second-generation soloists and groups that had previously been inactive or disbanded for years, including U-KISS, T-ara, SS501, Nine Muses, After School, and 2PM. The "2009 Classic Song Championship" is another notable episode for drawing a global audience to celebrate the second generation of K-pop.

The show has also proven its cultural reach by blending digital and traditional media: its YouTube-first content has been adapted to television on SBS, bridging new media and legacy broadcast spaces. Through the "JaeJae × Gabi × Seungheon" project, MMTG has engaged in real-world music production, turning its talk-show platform into a content-driven music incubator.

== Notable episodes ==
- 2020 Hidden Gems Concert – A Chuseok special featuring performances of "Bbi Ri Bba Bba" (삐리빠빠) by Narsha, "Don't Spray Perfume" by Teen Top, "Man Man Ha Ni" by U-KISS's Soohyun and Kevin, U-KISS's "Loud" by Teen Top, Soohyun, and Kevin (known as TeenKiss), "Roly-Poly" and "Sexy Love" by T-ara, and "U R Man" by SS501.
- 2021 "Songs that Deserve a Comeback" Concert – An episode featuring performances of "Dolls" by Nine Muses, "View" by Shinee, Gain's "Carnival" and VIXX's "Chained Up" by Jaejae, "Closer" by Oh My Girl, "Bang!" and "Diva" by After School, and "My House" by 2PM. Following the concert, several of the songs performed reclimbed various domestic music charts.
- 2009 Classic Song Championship – A 2024 Seollal special in which K-pop fans from 24 countries and K-pop idols vote for the top K-pop songs from 2009.
- Jaessbee (JaeJae × Gabi × Seungheon) Project – A series of episodes in which Jaejae collaborates with dancer Gabi and YouTuber Baek Seungheon to form a co-ed musical group called Jaessbee. The group debuted on November 11, 2024 with the single "Every Moment With You" (너와의 모든 지금), which charted for 35 weeks and peaked at number seven on the Circle Digital Chart. In the years following, the group has reunited through MMTG to release new music and perform at music shows and concerts such as Waterbomb.
- A/S Fan Signing Event – In February 2026, Jaejae held a joint fan signing event with singer Jang Hyun-seung as the culmination of the "Idol Exorcist" series. A total of 100 people attended the event.

== Reception ==
Media outlets have praised MMTG for its unique blend of nostalgia, global engagement, and meaningful interviews. The show’s "2009 Classic Song Championship" in particular received attention for its scale and emotional resonance among international K-pop fans. Additionally, the "Jaessbee" project was noted in the press for being ambitious despite relatively low production budgets, a testament to the community-driven nature of MMTG.
