= Again & Again (2PM song) =

2009 single by 2PM

Single by 2PM

from the album 01:59PM
- B-side: "What Time Is It"; "I Hate You"; "Maybe She'll Come Back"
- Released: April 16, 2009
- Recorded: 2009
- Genre: K-pop; Dance-pop; R&B
- Length: 4:05
- Label: JYP
- Songwriter: Park Jin-young
- Producer: Park Jin-young

2PM singles chronology
"Only You (Winter Special)" (2008)	"Again & Again" (2009)	"Heartbeat" (2009)

2PM chronology
Hottest Time of the Day (2008)	2:00PM Time for Change (2009)	2PM Thailand Special Edition (2009)

Music video
- "Again & Again" on YouTube

"Again & Again" is a Korean song by South Korean boy band 2PM. It is the title track of the group's second single album 2:00PM Time for Change, released on April 16, 2009 via JYP Entertainment. The song was 2PM's first number-one single and has won the group several accolades, including the 2009 MAMA Award for Artist of the Year.

== Background ==
"Again & Again" is a dance-pop song with R&B elements composed and written by Park Jin-young. The song was recorded over the course of a week at JYP Entertainment's New York branch, where local staff members including Grammy Award-nominated Vlado Meller assisted in the post-production and mastering process. The lyrics of the song are from the perspective of a man who cannot stop thinking about and going back to a woman who broke his heart.

The track would later be included in 2PM's first studio album, 01:59PM, released on November 10, 2009. Another version of the song was recorded without former 2PM member Jaebeom's vocals to be included in the 2012 compilation album 2PM Member's Selection.

== Music video ==
Two teasers for "Again & Again" were released on April 13 and 14, 2009. The music video, directed by Jang Jae-hyuk, was released on April 16, 2009. Both a teaser video and the music video itself were the most viewed YouTube videos in the music category on April 14 and April 17 respectively.

The music video alternates between scenes of the members individually following and watching a woman, who walks with another man into her house, and scenes showcasing the song's choreography with three different backdrops: one with radiating lines of lights, one with nested squares at different angles, and one with a curved backdrop. The ending features a dance break sequence involving acrobatic stunts and breakdancing.

== Promotion ==
2PM performed "Again & Again" for the first time on the music program M Countdown on April 23, 2009. They continued promoting the song on the TV music programs M Countdown, Music Bank, Show! Music Core, and Inkigayo for seven weeks. On the May 7 episode of M Countdown, "Again & Again" earned the group their first Mutizen Song award on a TV music program for being the show's top-charting song. The song would go on to win the group their first triple crown on M Countdown, followed by another triple crown on Inkigayo. 2PM would then promote their B-side track "I Hate You" from the same single album in June, becoming the first act on M Countdown to win two triple crowns for songs from the same album in July. 2PM has also performed "Again & Again" on TV shows such as Kim Jung-eun's Chocolate and Infinite Challenge, as well as end-of-year award ceremonies.

== Reception ==
"Again & Again" debuted at number 56 on Melon's Weekly Chart, but climbed up to the top of the chart over the course of four weeks. The song also topped other domestic music charts including Cyworld, Muse, Hanteo, and Dosirak. Upon the release of the song's music video in Thailand in June, the song also topped Thai music charts such as the Channel V Thailand Asian Chart and MTV Thailand International Chart.

By the end of 2009, "Again & Again" placed fifth in Melon's Year-End Chart. In addition, in Gallup Korea's annual survey, "Again & Again" was voted the fourth most popular song of 2009 in South Korea. The song also won the fan-voted Song of the Year award at the 2009 KBS Song Festival.

== Track listing ==
All editions track listing
No.	Title	Writer(s)	Arrangements	Length
1.	"What Time Is It Now?"	Park Jin-young	Fame-J	1:07
2.	"Again & Again"	Park Jin-young	Park Jin-young; Hong Ji Sang	4:05
3.	"I Hate You" (Korean: 니가 밉다; RR: Niga mipda)	Super Changddai	Super Changddai	3:06
4.	"Maybe She'll Come Back" (Korean: 돌아올지도 몰라; RR: Doraoljido molla)	Fame-J	Fame-J	4:07
5.	"Again & Again" (R&B mix)	Park Jin-young	Park Jin-young; Tommy Park	3:43
6.	"Again & Again" (instrumental)	Park Jin-young	Park Jin-young; Hong Ji Sang	4:05
7.	"I Hate You" (instrumental)	Super Changddai	Super Changddai	3:02
8.	"Maybe She'll Come Back" (instrumental)	Fame-J	Fame-J	4:07
Total length:				27:22

== Release history ==
Release history and formats
Region	Date	Format(s)	Ref.
Various	April 16, 2009	Digital download	
South Korea	April 23, 2009	CD single	

== Accolades ==
Awards and nominations for "Again & Again"
Year	Organization	Award	Result	Ref.
2009	Golden Disc Awards	Digital Bonsang Award	Nominated	
2009	KBS Song Festival	Song of the Year	Won	
2009	Melon Music Awards	Song of the Year	Nominated	
2009	Mnet Asian Music Awards	Artist of the Year	Won	
2009	Mnet Asian Music Awards	Best Male Group	Won	
2009	Mnet Asian Music Awards	Best Dance Performance	Nominated	

Music program awards for "Again & Again"
Program	Date	Ref.
M Countdown	May 7, 2009	
M Countdown	May 14, 2009	
M Countdown	May 21, 2009	
M Countdown	May 28, 2009	
Music Bank	June 12, 2009	
Inkigayo	May 10, 2009	
Inkigayo	May 17, 2009	
Inkigayo	May 24, 2009	

Music program awards for "I Hate You"
Program	Date	Ref.
M Countdown	July 2, 2009	
M Countdown	July 9, 2009	
M Countdown	July 16, 2009	
M Countdown	July 30, 2009	
Music Bank	July 3, 2009	

Awards and nominations for 2:00PM Time for Change
Year	Organization	Award	Result	Ref.
2009	Melon Music Awards	Album of the Year	Nominated	
