= Gentlemen's Game =

Studio album by 2PM
- Released: September 13, 2016
- Genres: K-pop; Contemporary R&B
- Language: Korean
- Label: JYP Entertainment

2PM chronology
Galaxy of 2PM (2016)	Gentlemen's Game (2016)	2PM Best in Korea 2 ～2012–2017～ (2019)

Singles from Gentlemen's Game
- 1. "Promise (I'll Be)" Released: September 13, 2016

Gentlemen's Game is the sixth Korean and eleventh overall studio album by South Korean boy band 2PM. The album was released on September 13, 2016, by JYP Entertainment as a celebration of their eight-year anniversary together. It was the final Korean release by 2PM before the members began their mandatory military service.

== Background and release ==
On September 4, 2016, 2PM's eighth anniversary since debuting, 2PM member Lee Jun-ho posted a schedule of 2PM's new album release dates. The teaser images of the members were released from September 5 to September 8, the music video teaser was released on September 9, and the track list and album spoiler were released on September 10. The final teaser was a choreography spoiler uploaded to JYP Entertainment's YouTube channel on September 11. The official music video for the title track "Promise (I'll Be)" was released on September 13, along with the release of the full album. On the same day of the album's release, 2PM member Taecyeon announced that it would be the group's final Korean music release prior to the group going on hiatus due to the group's members enlisting in the South Korean military.

== Composition ==
The album consists of eleven tracks, primarily of the electro-R&B genre, seven of which credit 2PM members Taecyeon, Wooyoung, or Chansung for lyrics and/or composition. The title track, "Promise (I'll Be)", was co-written and co-composed by 2PM member Taecyeon. One of the tracks written by Chansung, "Make Love", was notably banned by the Korean Broadcasting System due to its lyrics describing one's desire to have sex with a lover.

== Promotion ==
In the hour leading up to the release Gentleman's Game, 2PM held a live premiere event via V Live+ on September 12, 2016, where they performed songs from Gentleman's Game including "Promise (I'll Be)". The group then performed the song for two weeks on Korean television music programs, starting with the September 22, 2016 episode of M Countdown. 2PM also promoted the album through various Korean variety show guest appearances in which they performed title track "Promise (I'll Be)", such as the September 10, 2016 episode of the eighth season of Saturday Night Live Korea, which they hosted, and the October 1, 2016 episode of You Hee-yeol's Sketchbook.

== Commercial performance ==
The album debuted at number-one on the Gaon Album Chart, where it charted for five consecutive weeks. The album also topped ITunes album charts in four other Asian countries, Thailand, Taiwan, Indonesia, and Singapore, as well as the Apple Music album chart in Thailand. In Japan, the album peaked at number 12 on the Oricon Albums Chart, where it charted for a total of eight weeks. In the United States, the album peaked at number 11 on Billboard's World Digital Song Sales.

== Track listing ==
No.	Title	Lyrics	Music	Length
1.	"Promise (I'll Be)"	Taecyeon; Lesley Chiang; Raphael	Taecyeon; Chiang; Raphael	3:28
2.	"Uneasy"	Chansung	Jimmy Burney; Jonas W. Karlsson	3:42
3.	"Giv U Class."	Wooyoung	Wooyoung; superkiro	3:31
4.	"Make Love"	Chansung; Taecyeon	Chansung; LEL	3:37
5.	"All Night Long" (Korean: 시도때도없이; RR: Sidottaedoeopsi)	Kim Won	Kim	3:18
6.	"Never"	Joo Chan-yang	220; Andrew Choi; Secret Weapon	3:20
7.	"Humming" (Korean: 콧노래; RR: Konnorae)	Wooyoung; LEL; Wizil	Wooyoung; LEL	3:29
8.	"Shall We?" (Korean: 어때?; RR: Eottae?)	Lee Joo-hyung; Kye Beom-ju	Lee; Kye; Jonas Mengler	3:21
9.	"Perfume" (Korean: 향수; RR: Hyangsu)	e.one; Taecyeon	e.one	3:48
10.	"My Last"	Lee; NOPARI; GDLO	Lee; NOPARI	3:23
11.	"Can't Stop Feeling"	Chansung; Taecyeon	Chansung; LEL	3:17
Total length:				38:30

== Charts ==
=== Weekly charts ===
Chart performance for Gentlemen's Game
Chart (2016)	Peak position
South Korea (Gaon)	1
Japan (Oricon)	12
US World Albums (Billboard)	11

=== Monthly charts ===
Chart performance for Gentlemen's Game
Chart (2016)	Peak position
South Korea (Gaon)	3

=== Year-end charts ===
Year-end chart performance for Gentlemen's Game
Chart (2016)	Position
South Korea (Gaon)	42

== Sales ==
Country	Sales
South Korea	69,678
Japan	12,287

== Release history ==
Region	Date	Format	Label
Worldwide	September 13, 2016	Digital download	JYP Entertainment
South Korea	September 13, 2016	CD	JYP Entertainment
