= JYP Entertainment discography =

JYP Entertainment is a South Korean entertainment company established in 1997 by J.Y. Park. The company operates as a record label, talent agency, music production company, event management and concert production company, and music publishing house. It is currently one of the largest entertainment companies in South Korea.

The label is home to K-pop artists such as J.Y. Park, 2PM, DAY6, TWICE, Stray Kids, Boy Story, ITZY, NiziU, Xdinary Heroes, NMIXX, NEXZ, KickFlip, and more. The label's former artists include Rain, g.o.d, Wonder Girls, 2AM, Miss A, 15&, GSoul, GOT7, and Bernard Park, among others.

This is the discography of JYP Entertainment as a label. Releases by active JYP artists where they are licensed to other labels such as OSTs, featurings, or collaborations are not included. Japanese releases that are fully licensed to a Japanese partner label and do not feature the JYP Entertainment label or copyright on the release are still included, but highlighted.

== 1999-2000s ==
=== 1999–2004 ===
List of releases
Release Date	Title	Artist	Type	Language	Co-Label	Catalog Number(s)
December 2, 1999	Jinju's Soul Music	Pearl	Studio album	Korean	Daeyoung AV	DYCD-1098
January 18, 2000	쌍둥이 파워	량현량하	Studio album	Korean	Daeyoung AV	DYCD-1102 (CD) DYC-105 (Cassette)
July 26, 2000	Coming-of-Age Ceremony (성인식)	Park Ji-yoon	Studio album	Korean	Daeyoung AV	DYCD-1120 (CD); DYC-112 (Cassette)
April, 2001	Coming-of-Age Ceremony (성인식) Taiwan Limited Edition	Park Ji-yoon	Studio album (reissue)	Korean	Daeyoung AV; Rock Records & Tapes	ROD9181-4
June 7, 2001	Game	J. Y. Park	Studio album	Korean	Daeyoung AV	DYCD-1152 (CD) DYC-144 (Cassette)
January 11, 2002	Man	Park Ji-yoon	Studio album	Korean	Daeyoung AV	DYCD-1167
May 13, 2002	Bad Guy	Rain	Studio album	Korean	Daeyoung AV	DYCD-1175
October 10, 2002	December 32 Days (12월 32일)	Byul	Studio album	Korean	Daeyoung AV	DYCD-1193 (CD) DYC-179 (Cassette)
November 20, 2002	JYP Remixed	Park Ji-yoon, Rain	Studio album	Korean	Daeyoung AV	DYCD-1197
December 16, 2002	Noel (노을)	Noel	Studio album	Korean	Daeyoung AV	DYCD-1202
February 27, 2003	Twenty One	Park Ji-yoon	Studio album	Korean	Daeyoung AV	DYCD-1210
April 5, 2003	Twenty One Taiwan Edition	Park Ji-yoon	Studio album (reissue)	Korean	Daeyoung AV; Guts Records	GUT-2058
October 16, 2003	Rain 2	Rain	Studio album	Korean	POIBOS	DYCD-1230
May 27, 2004	These Are The Times (아파도 아파도)	Noel	Studio album	Korean	YBM Seoul Records	SRCD-3761
July, 2004	Rain 2 Taiwan Edition	Rain	Studio album (rerelease)	Korean	Guts Records	GUT-2076
October 8, 2004	I Do	Rain	Digital single	Korean	-	-
October 8, 2004	It's Raining	Rain	Studio album	Korean	YBM Seoul Records	SRCD-3777
December 9, 2004	An Ordinary Day	g.o.d	Studio album	Korean	YBM Seoul Records	SRCD-3786

=== 2005 ===
List of releases
Release Date	Title	Artist	Type	Language	Co-Label(s)	Catalog Number(s)
February 16	It's Raining Japanese Edition	Rain	Studio album (reissue)	Korean	King Records	KICP-1054
February 16	I Do (Japanese Version)	Rain	Digital single	Japanese	King Records	-
March 17	Star (안부)	Byul	Studio album	Korean	YBM Seoul Records	SRCD-3765
May 9	Music Is My Life	Lim Jeong-hee	Digital single	Korean	-	-
June 10	Music Is My Life	Lim Jeong-hee	Studio album	Korean	Big Hit Entertainment; T-Entertainment	TE-195-01
June 23	Rain's First Live Concert Rainy Day	Rain	Live album	Korean	Tube Media	2005-DVD89
September 23	The Rain's Soundtrack (浪漫再現 Rain 韓劇原聲帶)	J.Y. Park, Byul, Noel, Lim Jeong-hee, Rain	Compilation album	Korean	Universal Music Taiwan	9833687 KR002
September 24	Rain's First Live Concert Rainy Day (Deluxe Special Edition) (Hong Kong edition)	Rain	Live album (reissue)	Korean	Tube Media; Universal Music Hong Kong	983375
October 28	Into the Sky	g.o.d	Studio album	Korean	YBM Seoul Records	SRCD-3834
October 31	Rain's First Live Concert Rainy Day (Taiwan edition)	Rain	Live album (reissue)	Korean	齊威國際多媒體 (Power International Multimedia INC.)	01140009TN
December 7	Early Works	Rain	Compilation album	Korean	King Records	KICP-1116~17

=== 2006 ===
List of releases
Release Date	Title	Artist	Type	Language	Co-Label(s)	Catalog Number(s)
January 25	Sad Tango	Rain	Single	Japanese	King Records	KICM 7003; KICM 97003
February 10	Everything Was You (전부 너였다)	Noel	Studio album	Korean	-	JYCD-037
March 23	Thanks	Lim Jeong-hee	Studio album	Korean	Big Hit Entertainment; YBM Seoul Records	SDCD-0021 (CD); SDDC-0200 (Cassette)
April 25	Go Forward	Rain	Digital single	Korean	-	-
June 7	Free Way	Rain	Single	Japanese	King Records	KICM 7004; KICM 97004 (Limited)
September 6	Move On	Rain	Single	Japanese	King Records	KICM 7005; KICM 97005 (Limited)
September 7	BMW Meets Truth	Rain	Digital single	Korean	YBM Seoul Records	-
September 16	Eternal Rain	Rain	Studio album	Japanese	King Records	KICP 1149 (CD Japan); KICP 91149 (Japan Limited CD); TY0140C (CD China); KR 003 (Cassette)
September 22	Eternal Rain Limited Edition	Rain	Studio album (reissue)	Japanese	King Records; Universal Music Taiwan (regional); Universal Music Hong Kong (regional)	9800810
October 14	Rain's World	Rain	Studio album	Korean	Warner Music Group Hong Kong (regional); YBM Seoul Records	CBM0242 (Hong Kong); SRCD-3922
December 22	Rain's World Repackaged	Rain	Studio album (reissue)	Korean	YBM Seoul Records	SRCD-3942

=== 2007 ===
List of releases
Release Date	Title	Artist	Type	Language	Co-Label(s)	Catalog Number
February 13	The Wonder Begins	Wonder Girls	Single album	Korean	YBM Seoul Records	SRCD-3964
April 4	Rain 2 Japanese Edition	Rain	Studio album (re-release)	Korean	King Records	KICP-1223
April 27	미안한 마음 ~Tears~	Wonder Girls	Digital single	Korean	-	-
September 13	The Wonder Years	Wonder Girls	Studio album	Korean	YBM Seoul Records; GMM Grammy (Thailand)	SDL 0025; AVCD172 (Thailand)
October 8	Before I Go J-Lim	Lim Jeong-hee	Studio album	Korean	YBM Seoul Records	SDL 0035
November 19	Back To Stage	J.Y. Park	Studio album	Korean	YBM Seoul Records	SDL 0066
November 26	Joyo Joyo (쪼요쪼요)	Wonder Girls	Digital single	Korean	-	-
December 20	Sky, Wind (하늘아 바람아)	Lim Jeong-hee	Digital single	Korean	-	-

=== 2008 ===
List of releases
Release Date	Title	Artist	Type	Language	Co-Label(s)	Catalog Number
January 10	Young Lady (어린 여자)	Joo	Single album	Korean	YBM Seoul Records	SDL 0061
May 22	"So Hot"	Wonder Girls	Digital single	Korean	-	-
June 3	So Hot (The 3rd Project)	Wonder Girls	Single album	Korean	LOEN Entertainment; KMP Holdings	SDL 0126; JYPK 0128
July 21	This Song (이노래)	2AM	Single album	Korean	LOEN Entertainment; KMP Holdings	SDL 0141; JYPK 0129
August 29	Hottest Time of the Day	2PM	Single album	Korean	LOEN Entertainment; KMP Holdings	SDL 0162; JYPK 0130
September 22	The Wonder Years: Trilogy	Wonder Girls	EP	Korean	LOEN Entertainment; GMM Grammy (Thailand)	SDL 0171; AVC0235 (Thailand)
November 18	Anybody	Wonder Girls feat. Dynamicduo, San E & J.Y. Park	Digital single	Korean	-	-
December 10	Only You (Winter Special)	2PM	Digital single	Korean	-	-

=== 2009 ===
List of releases
Release Date	Title	Artist	Type	Language	Co-Label	Catalog Number
March 23	Time For Confession	2AM	Single album	Korean	LOEN Entertainment	L100003767
April 16	2:00PM Time for Change	2PM	Single album	Korean	LOEN Entertainment	L100003786
June 25	2PM Thailand Special Edition	2PM	Compilation album	Korean	Sony Music Thailand	-
June 26	Nobody	Wonder Girls	Digital single	English	-	-
June 29	"Nobody (English Version)"	Wonder Girls	Digital single	English	-	-
October 11	Nobody (Sing-Along Version)	Wonder Girls	Single	English	-	-
October 30	Nobody (The Remix Edition)	Wonder Girls	Digital single	English	-	-
November 10	01:59PM	2PM	Studio album	Korean	LOEN Entertainment	L100003933
December 3	Sad Freedom	J.Y. Park	Single album	Korean	LOEN Entertainment	L100003955

== 2010s ==
Used to note fully licensed releases by active JYP artists that do not feature the JYP Ent. label or list it in the copyright credits

=== 2010 ===
List of releases
Release Date	Title	Artist	Type	Language	Co-Label(s)	Catalog Number(s)
January 21	Can't Let You Go Even If I Die	2AM	EP	Korean	Big Hit Entertainment; LOEN Entertainment	L100004001
January 29	Nobody Rainstone Remix	Wonder Girls	Digital single	English	-	-
February 10	Wonder Girls Taiwan Special Edition	Wonder Girls	Compilation album	Korean, Chinese	Universal Music Taiwan; M-Net Media Corp	2734061; 27340613
February 10	Wonder Girls HK Special Edition	Wonder Girls	Compilation album	Korean, Chinese	Universal Music Hong Kong; M-Net Media Corp	2734061; 2734062; 27340613
March 18	I Was Wrong	2AM	Studio album (reissue)	Korean	Big Hit Entertainment; LOEN Entertainment	L100004026
April 19	Don't Stop Can't Stop	2PM	Single album	Korean	LOEN Entertainment	L100004048
May 8	Wonder Girls China Special Edition	Wonder Girls	Compilation album	Korean, Chinese	-	GE0477C
May 10	2PM Taiwan Special Edition	2PM	Compilation album	Korean	Universal Music Taiwan	2741104
May 15	2 Different Tears	Wonder Girls	EP	English, Korean, Chinese	LOEN Entertainment; Universal Music Taiwan (Taiwan Limited Edition)	L100004062; J071306003; JYPK 0139; 2743838
June 30	"The Day Of Confession" (고백하던 날)	Jo Kwon	Digital single	Korean	-	-
July 1	Bad But Good	Miss A	Single album	Korean	AQ Entertainment; LOEN Entertainment	L100004111
August 17	"Thank You"	2PM	Digital single	Korean	-	-
August 31	2PM 2nd Special Edition	2PM	Compilation album	Korean	Universal Music Taiwan	2750125
September 9	"Nori for U"	2PM	Digital single	Korean	-	-
September 10	Everybody Ready?	San E	Digital EP	Korean	-	-
September 27	Step Up	Miss A	Single album	Korean	AQ Entertainment; LOEN Entertainment	JYPK 0154; L100004151
September 30	It Can't Be Real	Lim Jeong-hee	EP	Korean	Big Hit Entertainment; LOEN Entertainment	L100004160
October 11	Still 02:00PM	2PM	EP	Korean	LOEN Entertainment	JYPK 0239, L100004171
October 26	Saint o'Clock	2AM	Studio album	Korean	Big Hit Entertainment; LOEN Entertainment	L100004170
December 1	"This Christmas"	JYP Nation	Digital single	Korean	-	-

=== 2011 ===
List of releases
Release Date	Title	Artist	Type	Language	Co-Label(s)	Catalog Number(s)
January 3	Heartmade	Joo	EP	Korean	LOEN Entertainment	L100004212
February 14	Dream High	Various Artists	Soundtrack album	Korean	HolyM (joint venture label); LOEN Entertainment	L100004248
March 9	All About 2PM	2PM	Compilation album	Korean	Sony Music Entertainment Japan	BVCL 185~191
April 26	"Please Don't Go" (가면 안돼)	San E featuring Outsider & Changmin	Single	Korean	-	-
May 2	"Love Alone"	Miss A	Single	English	-	-
May 9	Golden Lady	Lim Jeong-hee	EP	Korean	Big Hit Entertainment; LOEN Entertainment	L100004271
May 16	"Ice Cream" (아이스크림)	Joo with Leeteuk	Digital single	Korean	-	-
May 18	Take Off	2PM	Single	Japanese	Ariola Japan	BVCL 211~13
June 20	Hands Up	2PM	Studio album	Korean	LOEN Entertainment; Universal Music Taiwan (regional); KMP Holdings (re-release)	L100004306; 2779800; JYPK 0240
July 18	A Class	Miss A	Studio album	Korean	AQ Entertainment; LOEN Entertainment; Universal Music Taiwan (regional)	L100004286; 2785590
July 27	Dream High OST Japanese Premium Edition	Various Artists	Soundtrack album	Korean	Warner Music Japan	WPCL 10985; WPZL 30314/5
August 7	You Walking Toward Me (걸어온다)	Jinwoon	Single	Korean	-	-
August 17	I'm Your Man	2PM	Single	Japanese	Ariola Japan (CD version)	BVCL 240
September 20	A Class (Taiwan Deluxe Edition)	Miss A	Studio album (reissue)	Korean, Chinese	AQ Entertainment; Universal Music Taiwan	2785590
November 2	Ultra Lover	2PM	Single	Japanese	Ariola Japan	BVCL 272
November 7	"Alive"	Jun. K	Digital single	Korean	-	-
November 9	Saint o'Clock: Japan Special Edition	2AM	Studio album (reissue)	Japanese	Big Hit Entertainment; Ariola Japan	BVCL 273~4
November 11	Wonder World	Wonder Girls	Studio album	Korean	LOEN Entertainment; Universal Music Taiwan (regional)	JYPK 0151; 2793685; L100004386
November 17	"Now or Never" (지금이 아니면)	Jinwoon	Single	Korean	Big Hit Entertainment; LOEN Entertainment	L100004384
November 30	Republic of 2PM	2PM	Studio album	Japanese	Ariola Japan (Japan); Sony Music Taiwan (regional)	BVCL 285~6
December 3	K-Food Party	Wonder Girls	Digital single	Korean	-	-

=== 2012 ===
List of releases
Release Date	Title	Artist	Type	Language	Co-Label(s)	Catalog Number(s)
January 11	Never Let You Go: Shindemo Hanasanai	2AM	Single album	Japanese	Ariola Japan; Sony Music Taiwan (regional)	BVCL 298~9; 88691938182 (Taiwan)
January 12	"The DJ Is Mine"	Wonder Girls	Digital single	English	-	-
January 31	Dream High 2 Soundtrack	Various Artists	Soundtrack album	Korean	HolyM (joint venture label); LOEN Entertainment	-
February 20	Touch	Miss A	EP	Korean	AQ Entertainment; KMP Holdings; Universal Music Taiwan (regional)	JYPK 0112; 3700395 (Taiwan)
March 10	F. Scott Fitzgerald's Way of Love	2AM	EP	Korean	Big Hit Entertainment; KMP Holdings; Universal Music Group (regional)	JYPK 0113; JYPK 0118; 370 017-8 (Thailand); 3716275 (Taiwan)
March 14	2PM Best ~2008–2011 in Korea~	2PM	Compilation album	Korean	Epic JYP (joint venture label)	ESCL 5285; ESCL 5287; ESCL 5289
March 23	Touch (Asia Version)	Miss A	EP	Korean, Chinese	Universal Music Taiwan	3700395
April 11	電話に出ない君に	2AM	Single album	Japanese	Ariola Japan; Sony Music Taiwan	BVCL 322~3; BVCL 325; 88691973102 (Taiwan)
April 28	Spring: 5 Songs for a New Love(Spring 새로운 사랑에게 보내는 다섯곡의 노래)	J.Y. Park	EP	Korean	KMP Holdings	JYPK 0171
May 22	2PM Member's Selection	2PM	Compilation album	Korean	LOEN Entertainment	L100004484
May 20	Bounce	JJ Project	Single album	Korean	KT Music Co., Ltd.	JYPK 0175
June 3	Wonder Party	Wonder Girls	EP	Korean	Warner Music Malaysia (regional)	JYPK 0181; 5310556502 (Malaysia)
June 6	Beautiful	2PM	Single	Japanese	Ariola Japan (CD version)	BBVCL 335~8
June 25	I'm Da One	Jo Kwon	Studio album	Korean, English	Big Hit Entertainment	JYPK 0185; JYPK 1093
July 1	"Movie Star"	J.Y. Park	Digital single	Korean	-	-
July 4	One Day	One Day	Single	Japanese	Ariola Japan; Sony Music Taiwan (regional)	BVCL 400-1; 88725439532 (Taiwan)
July 8	23, Male, Single	Jang Wooyoung	EP	Korean	KMP Holdings	JYPK 0192
July 10	"Like Money"	Wonder Girls	Digital single	English	-	-
July 25	Nobody For Everybody	Wonder Girls	EP	Korean, Japanese, English	Defstar Records	DFCL 1901; DFCL 1903~5; DDCF 80382
August 8	F. Scott Fitzgerald's Way of Love ~Japan Special Edition~	2AM	EP	Korean	Ariola Japan; Big Hit Entertainment	BVCL 365~6
September 10	I'm Baek	Baek A-yeon	EP	Korean	AQ Entertainment; KMP Holdings	JYPK 0208
September 12	For You ~君のためにできること~	2AM	Single album	Japanese	Ariola Japan	BVCL 424~5
September 17	"Classic"	J.Y. Park, Jang Wooyoung, Ok Taec-yeon, & Suzy	Digital single	Korean	-	-
October 5	"I Dream"	15&	Digital single	Korean	-	-
October 14	Independent Women Part III	Miss A	EP	Korean	-	JYPK 0215
November 9	Independent Women, Pt. III Asia Special Edition	Miss A	Studio album	Korean, Chinese	-	-
November 14	Wonder Best Korea / USA / Japan 2007–2012	Wonder Girls	Compilation album	Korean, Japanese, English	Defstar Records	DFCL 1951~5
November 14	Masquerade	2PM	Single	Japanese	Ariola Japan	BVCL 430~2
December 3	"誰にも渡せないよ"	2AM	Digital single	Japanese	Ariola Japan	-
December 4	"Winter Gift"	2AM	Digital single	Japanese	Ariola Japan	-
December 5	誰にも渡せないよ	2AM	Single album	Japanese	Ariola Japan	BVCL 466~8

=== 2013 ===
List of releases
Release Date	Title	Artist	Type	Language	Co-Label(s)	Catalog Number(s)
January 9	Voice	2AM	Studio album	Japanese	Ariola Japan; Sony Music Taiwan (regional)	BVCL 476~80; 88765490652 (Taiwan)
January 18	"I Wonder If You Hurt Like Me (Japanese Version) (キミも僕のように)"	2AM	Digital single	Japanese	Ariola Japan	-
February 13	Legend of 2PM	2PM	Studio album	Japanese	Ariola Japan; Sony Music (non-SK regions)	BVCL 488
March 5	One Spring Day	2AM	Korean	Universal Music Taiwan (regional)	3736061 (Taiwan)	
April 7	Somebody	15&	Korean	Digital single	-	-
May 6	Grown	2PM	Korean	Studio album	KMP Holdings	JYPK 0254~5
May 11	"A.D.T.O.Y."	2PM	Korean	Digital single	-	
May 29	"Give Me Love"	2PM	Single	Japanese	Ariola Japan	BVCL 512~4
June 7	A Good Girl	Baek A-yeon	EP	Korean	AQ Entertainment	-
June 25	Grown – Grand Edition	2PM	Studio album (reissue)	Korean	KMP Holdings	JYPK 0262
July 24	Kimi no Koe (キミの声)	Lee Jun-ho	EP	Japanese	Ariola Japan	BVCL 518
August 14	One Spring Day Japan Special Edition	2AM	Studio album (reissue)	Korean	Ariola Japan; Big Hit Entertainment	BVCL 534
August 26	"24 Hours"	Sunmi	Digital single	Korean	-	-
September 2	"Greatest of These"	J.Y. Park with Namgung Songok & Gaeko	Digital single	Korean	-	-
September 9	Halftime	J.Y. Park	EP	Korean	-	-
October 16	Winter Games	2PM	Single	Japanese	Epic Records Japan (CD version)	ESCL-4117
November 6	Hush	Miss A	Studio album	Korean	AQ Entertainment; KT Music; Universal Music Taiwan (regional)	JYPK 0308; 3765270 (Taiwan)
November 27	Nocturne	2AM	EP	Korean	Big Hit Entertainment; KT Music; Universal Music Taiwan (regional)	JYPK 0306; 3768964 (Taiwan)

=== 2014 ===
List of releases
Release Date	Title	Artist	Type	Language	Licensee Label(s)	Catalog Number(s)
January 20	Got It?	GOT7	EP	Korean	-	JYPK 0322
January 29	Genesis of 2PM	2PM	Studio album	Japanese	Ariola Japan; Epic Records Japan	ESC8 1~2; ESCL 4155
February 17	Full Moon	Sunmi	EP	Korean	-	JYPK 0329
April 13	"Can't Hide It"	15&	Digital single	Korean	-	-
May 14	Love & Hate	Jun. K	EP	Japanese	-	JYPK 0390
May 26	Sugar	15&	Studio album	Korean	-	JYPK 0383
June 12	"No Love" (Korean version)	Jun. K	Digital single	Korean	-	-
June 23	Got Love	GOT7	EP	Korean	-	JYPK 0401
July 9	Feel	Lee Jun-ho	EP	Japanese	-	JYPK 0416
July 31	Me?	Ha:tfelt	EP	Korean	-	JYPK 0412
August 14	Feel (Korean Version)	Junho	Single album	Korean	-	-
August 20	2AM JAPAN TOUR 2012 "For you" in Tokyo International Forum	2AM	Live album	Japanese	Ariola Japan	ESBL 2371
September 10	Go Crazy!	2PM	Studio album	Korean	-	JYPK 0426
September 17	ミダレテミナ	2PM	Single	Japanese	Epic Records Japan	ESCL-4286~90
September 29	Go Crazy! – Grand Edition	2PM	Studio album (reissue)	Korean	-	JYPK 0427
October 13	I'm...	Bernard Park	EP	Korean	-	-
October 22	Around the World	GOT7	Single	Japanese	Epic Records Japan	ESCL 4306~7; ESCL 4310
October 27	"Days Like Today" (오늘따라)	2AM	Single	Korean	-	-
October 30	Let's Talk	2AM	Studio album	Korean	-	JYPK 0457
November 18	Identify	GOT7	Studio album	Korean	-	JYPK 0467~8
November 27	"Think of Me"	2AM	Single	Korean	-	-
December 10	JYP Nation Korea 2014 "One Mic"	JYP Nation	Live album	Korean	-	-
December 18	"Christmas With You"	Taecyeon	Digital single	Korean	-	-

=== 2015 ===
List of releases
Release Date	Title	Artist	Type	Language	Licensee or Co-Label	Catalog Number(s)
January 19	Coming Home	G.Soul	EP	Korean	Studio J	JYPK 0496
January 26	"You (Acoustic Version)"	G.Soul	Digital single	Korean	Studio J	-
January 28	"Guilty Love"	2PM	Single	Japanese	Epic Records Japan	ESCL 372~4
February 9	"Love Is Madness" (사랑은 미친짓)	15& featuring Kanto of Troy	Digital single	Korean	-	-
February 17	Dream Knight Special OST	Jay B	Digital single	Korean	JYP Pictures	-
March 4	R.O.S.E	Jang Wooyoung	Single album	Japanese	Epic Records Japan	ESCL 4402~3
March 30	Colors	Miss A	EP	Korean	-	JYPK 0509
April 5	"Hopeless Love"	Jimin Park	Digital single	Korean	Studio J	-
April 12	24/34	J.Y. Park	Digital single	Korean	-	-
April 15	2PM of 2PM	2PM	Studio album	Japanese	Epic Records Japan	ESCL 4440
April 20	R.O.S.E (Korean version)	Jang Wooyoung	Single	Korean	-	-
May 13	"Who's Your Mama? (Soul Ver.)"	J.Y Park featuring Lee Jin-ah & JiJohn	Digital single	Korean	-	-
May 20	"Shouldn't Have" (이럴거면 그러지말지)	Baek A-yeon featuring Young K	Digital single	Korean	Studio J	-
May 20	2PM of 2PM (Repackage)	2PM	Studio album (reissue)	Japanese	Epic Records Japan	-
May 22	Colors (Chinese version)	Miss A	EP (reissue)	Korean, Mandarin Chinese	Universal Music Taiwan	-
June 1	"Love Train"	GOT7	Digital single	Japanese	Epic Records Japan	-
June 10	"Love Train"	GOT7	Single	Japanese	Epic Records Japan	ESCL 4467~8
June 15	No.5	2PM	Studio album	Korean	-	JYPK 0537
June 29	Love Me Again	G.Soul	Digital single album	Korean	Studio J	-
July 13	Just Right	GOT7	EP	Korean	JYPK 0544	
July 15	So Good	Lee Jun-ho	EP	Japanese	Epic Records Japan	ESCL 4504
August 3	Reboot	Wonder Girls	Studio album	Korean	-	JYPK 0554
September 1	"Road to the Airport (Sing the Road #01)"	J.Y. Park & Lee Jin-ah	Digital single	Korean	-	-
September 7	The Day	Day6	EP	Korean	Studio J	JYPK 0565
September 8	"Jamsu Bridge (Sing the Road #02)"	J.Y. Park & Jung Seung-hwan	Digital single	Korean	-	-
September 10	Dirty	G.Soul	Digital EP	Korean	Studio J	-
September 14	One	Junho	Studio album	Korean	-	-
September 14	"Laugh Laugh Laugh"	GOT7	Digital single	Japanese	Epic Records Japan	-
September 23	"Laugh Laugh Laugh"	GOT7	Single	Japanese	Epic Records Japan	ESCL 4531
September 22	"Busan Memories (Sing the Road #03)"	J.Y Park, Bernard Park & Jamie (Jimin Park)	Digital single	Korean	-	-
September 24	"All I Need"	J.Y Park featuring P-Type	Digital single	Korean	-	-
September 29	Mad	GOT7	EP	Korean	-	JYPK 0576~7
October 20	The Story Begins	TWICE	EP	Korean	-	JYPK 0583
October 21	Higher	2PM	Single	Japanese	Epic Records Japan	ESCL 4557; ESCL 4549～50
October 21	Higher (Jun. K Version)	2PM	Single (reissue)	Japanese	Epic Records Japan	ESCL 4551
October 21	Higher (Nichkhun Version)	2PM	Single (reissue)	Japanese	Epic Records Japan	ESCL 4552
October 21	Higher (Taecyeon Version)	2PM	Single (reissue)	Japanese	Epic Records Japan	ESCL 4553
October 21	Higher (Wooyoung Version)	2PM	Single (reissue)	Japanese	Epic Records Japan	ESCL 4554
October 21	Higher (Junho Version)	2PM	Single (reissue)	Japanese	Epic Records Japan	ESCL 4555
October 21	Higher (Chansung Version)	2PM	Single (reissue)	Japanese	Epic Records Japan	ESCL 4556
October 23	"I Feel You (Chinese Version)"	Wonder Girls	Digital single	Chinese	-	-
November 23	Mad Winter Edition	GOT7	EP (reissue)	Korean	-	JYPK 0600
November 25	Love Letter	Jun. K	EP	Japanese	Epic Records Japan	ESCL 4564~70
November 30	Frank	Yerin Baek	Digital EP	Korean, English	Studio J	-
December 11	The Story Begins Taiwan Edition	TWICE	EP (reissue)	Korean	Universal Music Taiwan	8889172
December 16	"Be My Merry Christmas"	Taecyeon	Digital single	Korean	-	-
December 30	"Love Letter (Korean Version)"	Jun. K	Digital single	Korean	-	-

=== 2016 ===
List of releases
Release Date	Title	Artist	Type	Language	Licensee or Co-Label	Catalog Number(s)
January 7	"Dream"	Suzy & Baekhyun	Digital single	Korean	SM Entertainment; Mystic Entertainment; LOEN Entertainment	L100005157
February 3	Moriagatteyo	GOT7	Studio album	Japanese	Epic Records Japan	ESCL 4581~3
February 12	The Story Begins Thailand Edition	TWICE	EP (re-release)	Korean	BEC TERO Music	JYPK 0563
February 15	"Crosswalk" (횡단보도)	Jo Kwon	Digital single album	Korean	-	-
February 16	"Smooth Operator"	G.Soul featuring San E	Digital single	Korean	BrandNew Music; KT Music; Studio J	-
March 21	Flight Log: Departure	GOT7	EP	Korean	-	JYPK 0626
March 30	Daydream	Day6	EP	Korean	Studio J	JYPK 0645
April 3	"With You" (니가 보인다)	Bernard Park & Hyerim	Digital single	Korean	Studio J	-
April 10	"Still Alive" (살아있네)	J.Y. Park	Digital single	Korean	-	-
April 12	"HOME RUN"	GOT7	Digital single	Korean	-	-
April 25	Page Two	TWICE	EP	Korean	-	JYPK 0652
April 27	Galaxy of 2PM	2PM	Studio album	Japanese	Epic Records Japan	ESCL 4623
May 11	"Far, Far Away" (멀리멀리)	G.Soul	Digital single	Korean	Studio J	-
May 24	"So-So" (쏘쏘)	Baek A-yeon	Digital single	Korean	Studio J	-
June 15	Galaxy of 2PM (Repackage)	2PM	Studio album (reissue)	Japanese	Epic Records Japan	ESCL 4647~9
June 18	"To the Beautiful You" (아름다운 그대에게)	Wonder Girls	Single	Korean	Studio J	RNR-020
June 18	Still Alive (Limited Edition)	J.Y. Park	EP	Korean	-	RNR-021
June 20	"Bye Bye My Blue"	Yerin Baek	Digital single album	Korean	Studio J	-
July 5	Why So Lonely	Wonder Girls	Single album	Korean	-	JYPK 0676
July 19	DSMN	Junho	EP	Japanese	Epic Records Japan	ESCL 4673~6
July 21	"Fantasy"	Fei	Digital single album	Korean	-	-
July 25	"Encore"	JYP Nation	Digital single	Korean	-	-
August 2	"Don't Leave Me"	Jun. K featuring Baek A-Yeon	Digital single	Korean	-	-
August 9	Mr. No♡	Jun. K	EP	Korean	-	JYPK 0686
August 23	19 to 20	Jimin Park	Digital EP	Korean	Studio J	-
September 13	Gentlemen's Game	2PM	Studio album	Korean	-	JYPK 0695
September 27	Flight Log: Turbulence	GOT7	Studio album	Korean	-	JYPK 0697
September 30	Page Two Thailand Edition	TWICE	EP (reissue)	Korean	BEC Tero Music	JYPK 0652
October 24	Twicecoaster: Lane 1	TWICE	EP	Korean	-	JYPK 0711
October 26	"Promise (I'll Be)" (Japanese version)	2PM	Single album	Japanese	Epic Records Japan	ESCL 4740~7
October 31	"Hey Yah"	GOT7	Digital single	Japanese	Epic Records Japan	-
November 8	"Let me know"	GOT7	Digital single	Japanese	Epic Records Japan	-
November 16	Hey Yah	GOT7	EP	Japanese	Epic Records Japan	ESCL 4776~7
November 30	"Just Because" (그냥 한번)	Baek A-yeon featuring JB	Digital single	Korean	Studio J	-
December 7	"Love You on Christmas"	Yerin Baek	Digital single	Korean, English	Studio J	-
December 14	"Merry Christmas To You"	Taecyeon	Digital single	Korean	-	-
December 14	No Shadow	Jun. K	EP	Japanese	Epic Records Japan	ESCL 4800~6
December 19	Twicecoaster: Lane 1 (Christmas Edition)	TWICE	EP (reissue)	Korean	-	JYPK 0711
December 27	"Winter Hitori" (Winter 一人)	Taecyeon	Digital single	Japanese	Epic Records Japan	-

=== 2017 ===
List of releases
Release Date	Title	Artist	Type	Language	Licensee or Co-Label	Catalog Number(s)
January 4	"Your Wedding"	Jun. K	Digital single	Korean	-	-
January 6	Every DAY6 January	DAY6	Digital single	Korean	Studio J	-
January 12	77-1X3-00	Jun. K	EP	Korean	-	JYPK 0749
January 17	"Pretend" (행복한 척)	Suzy	Digital single	Korean	-	-
January 18	Taecyeon Special: Winter Hitori	Taecyeon	Studio album	Japanese, Korean	Epic Records Japan	ESCL 4824~5
January 24	Yes? No?	Suzy	EP	Korean	-	JYPK 0750
February 6	Every DAY6 February	DAY6	Digital single	Korean	Studio J	-
February 10	"Draw Me"	Wonder Girls	Digital single	Korean	-	-
February 16	Gentlemen's Game (Limited Edition)	2PM	Studio album (reissue)	Korean	-	JYPK 0715
February 20	Twicecoaster: Lane 2	TWICE	EP (reissue)	Korean	-	JYPK 0760
February 24	What's Twice?	TWICE	Digital compilation	Korean	Warner Music Japan	-
March 6	Every DAY6 March	DAY6	Digital single	Korean	Studio J	-
March 13	Flight Log: Arrival	GOT7	EP	Korean	-	JYPK 0765
March 17	Twicecoaster: Lane 1 (Thailand Limited Edition)	TWICE	EP (reissue)	Korean	BEC Tero Music	-
April 6	Every DAY6 April	DAY6	Digital single	Korean	Studio J	-
April 19	Party Shots	Jang Wooyoung	EP	Japanese	Epic Records Japan	ESLJ 3090 (Vinyl); ESCL 4850~1 (CD/DVD)
May 8	Every DAY6 May	DAY6	Digital single	Korean	Studio J	-
May 15	Signal	TWICE	EP	Korean	BEC Tero Music (regional)	JYPK 0785
May 24	My Swagger	GOT7	Single	Japanese	Epic JYP	ESCL 4872-3; 88985450732 (Thailand)
May 29	Bittersweet	Baek A-yeon	Digital EP	Korean	-	-
June 7	Sunrise	Day6	Studio album	Korean	-	JYPK 0790
June 14	"SIGNAL (Japanese Version)"	TWICE	Digital single	Japanese	-	-
June 28	"Blame" (탓)	Bernard Park	Digital single album	Korean	Studio J	-
June 28	#Twice	TWICE	Compilation album	Japanese, Korean	Warner Music Japan	WPCL-12634~5; WPZL-31298~9
July 6	Every DAY6 July	DAY6	Digital single	Korean	Studio J	-
July 7	Twicecoaster: Lane 2 (Thailand Limited Edition)	TWICE	EP (reissue)	Korean	BEC Tero Music	JYPK 0760
July 7	Sunrise (Taiwan Edition)	DAY6	Studio album (reissue)	Korean, Chinese	Universal Music Taiwan	8861075
July 26	2017 S/S	Junho	EP	Japanese	Epic JYP	ESCL 4902
July 31	Verse 2	JJ Project	EP	Korean	-	JYPK 0826
August 7	Every DAY6 August	DAY6	Digital single	Korean	Studio J	-
September 1	"How Old R U"	BOY STORY	Single	Chinese	NCC Entertainment	-
September 5	"Bye Bye"	Junho featuring CHEEZE	Digital single	Korean	-	-
September 6	Every DAY6 September	DAY6	Digital single	Korean	Studio J	-
September 11	Canvas	Junho	EP	Korean	-	JYPK 0838
September 29	Every DAY6 October	DAY6	Digital single	Korean	Studio J	-
October 10	7 for 7	GOT7	EP	Korean	-	JYPK 0849
October 11	Mada Boku Wa... (まだ僕は...)	Jang Wooyoung	EP	Japanese	Epic JYP	ESCL 4936
October 11	"Still Here" (똑같지 뭐)	Jang Wooyoung	Digital single	Korean	-	-
October 16	"Regrets" (후회해)	J. Y. Park featuring Heize	Digital single	Korean	-	-
October 18	"One More Time"	TWICE	Single	Japanese	Warner Music Japan	WPCL-12761; WPCL-12768; WPZL-31379~82
October 30	Twicetagram	TWICE	Studio album	Korean	BEC Tero Music (regional)	JYPK 0854
October 31	"Turn Up"	GOT7	Digital single	Japanese	Epic JYP	-
November 1	"Hellevator"	Stray Kids	Digital single	-	-	-
November 6	Every DAY6 November	DAY6	Digital single	-	-	-
November 15	Turn Up	GOT7	EP	Japanese	Epic JYP	ESCL 4944~5
November 20	"Nov to Feb"	Jun. K featuring Somi	Digital single	Korean	-	-
November 27	My 20's	Jun. K	EP	Korean	-	JYPK 0883
December 6	Moonrise	Day6	Studio album	Korean	-	JYPK 0880
December 11	Merry & Happy	TWICE	Studio album (reissue)	Korean	-	JYPK 0884
December 15	"Can't Stop"	BOY STORY	Single	Chinese	NCC Entertainment	-

=== 2018 ===
List of releases
Release Date	Title	Artist	Type	Language	Label Division	Licensee or Co-Label	Catalog Number(s)
January 8	Mixtape	Stray Kids	EP	Korean	Div 1	-	JYPK 0896
January 15	Bye (헤어질 때)	Jang Wooyoung	EP	Korean	Div 1	-	-
January 22	"I'm in Love With Someone Else" (다른사람을 사랑하고 있어)	Suzy	Digital single	Korean	Div 3	-	-
January 25	Winter Sleep	Junho	EP	Japanese	Div 1	Epic JYP	ESC8 30~1; ESCL 4978
January 29	Faces of Love	Suzy	EP	Korean	Div 3	-	JYPK 0899
February 7	"Candy Pop"	TWICE	Single	Japanese	Div 3	Warner Music Japan	WPCL-12820~1; WPZL-31403~6
February 28	"One and Only You"	GOT7 featuring Hyolyn	Digital single	Korean	Div 2	-	-
March 9	"Midnight" (잘자 내 몫까지)	Suzy featuring Yiruma	Digital single	Korean	Div 3	-	-
March 12	Eyes on You	GOT7	EP	Korean	Div 2	-	JYPK 1004
March 14	"If (Mata Aetara)"	DAY6	Single	Japanese	Studio J	Warner Music Japan	-
March 26	I Am Not	Stray Kids	EP	Korean	Div 1	-	JYPK 1005
March 29	"Jump Up"	BOY STORY	Single	Chinese	JYP China	NCC Entertainment	-
April 4	No Time	Jun. K	EP	Japanese	Div 1	Epic JYP	-
April 9	What Is Love?	TWICE	EP	Korean	Div 3	-	JYPK 1006
May 7	"The New Era"	GOT7	Digital single	Japanese	Div 2	Epic JYP	-
May 16	"Wake Me Up"	TWICE	Single	Japanese	Div 3	Warner Music Japan	WPCL-12871~2; WPZL-31450~3
May 23	Complex	Chansung	EP	Japanese	Div 1	Epic JYP	ESCL 5078~9
June 5	City Woman (都市女子)	Yubin	Digital single	Korean	Div 2	-	-
June 6	The Best Day	DAY6	Compilation album	Japanese	Studio J	Warner Music Japan	WPCL-12883; WPZL-31470~1
June 12	"Handz Up"	BOY STORY	Single	Chinese	JYP China	NCC Entertainment	-
June 15	"I Want You Back"	TWICE	Digital single	Japanese	Div 3	Warner Music Japan	-
June 20	The New Era (Limited Edition)	GOT7	Single album	Japanese	Div 2	Epic JYP	ESCL 5083~9
June 26	Shoot Me: Youth Part 1	DAY6	EP	Korean	Studio J	-	JYPK1009
June 26	"Souzou"	Junho	Digital single	Japanese	Div 1	Epic JYP	-
July 9	Summer Nights	TWICE	EP (reissue)	Korean	Div 3	-	JYPK 1011
July 11	Souzou (想像)	Junho	EP	Japanese	Div 1	Epic JYP	ESCL 5095~6
July 25	"Stop the Rain"	DAY6	Single	Japanese	Studio J	Warner Music Japan	WPCL-12912
August 6	I Am Who	Stray Kids	EP	Korean	Div 1	-	JYPK 1021
August 17	"BDZ"	TWICE	Digital single	Japanese	Div 3	Warner Music Japan	-
September 4	jiminxjamie	Jimin Park	Digital EP	Korean	Studio J	-	-
September 10	"Beautiful Feeling"	DAY6	Digital single	Korean	Studio J	-	-
September 12	BDZ	TWICE	Studio album	Japanese	Div 3	Warner Music Japan	WPCL-12914~5; WPZL-31490~3
September 17	Present: You	GOT7	Studio album	Korean, English, Chinese, Spanish	Div 2	-	JYPK 1028
September 18	"Breaking Down"	DAY6	Digital single	Japanese	Studio J	Warner Music Japan	-
September 21	Enough	BOY STORY	EP	Chinese	JYP China	NCC Entertainment	-
September 27	2PM Awards Selection	2PM	Digital compilation	Japanese	Div 1	Epic JYP	-
October 10	"Still..."	Bernard Park	Digital single	Korean	Studio J	-	-
October 17	Unlock	DAY6	Studio album	Japanese	Studio J	Warner Music Japan	WPCL-12947
October 22	I Am You	Stray Kids	EP	Korean	Div 1	-	JYPK 1036
October 22	"Stay by My Side"	TWICE	Digital single	Japanese	Div 3	Warner Music Japan	-
November 5	Yes or Yes	TWICE	EP	Korean	Div 3	-	JYPK 1039
November 9	"Lucky Charm"	Nichkhun	Digital single	English	Div 1	Epic JYP	-
November 21	Dear Me	Baek A-yeon	Digital EP	Korean	Studio J	-	-
November 22	"For U"	BOY STORY	Digital single	Chinese	JYP China	NCC Entertainment	-
November 27	#TUSM	Yubin	Digital single album	Korean	Div 2	-	-
December 3	Present: You & Me	GOT7	Studio album (reissue)	Korean, English, Chinese, Spanish	Div 2	-	JYPK 1040
December 5	Junho the Best	Junho	Compilation album	Japanese	Div 1	Ariola Japan; Epic JYP	ESCL 5144
December 10	Remember Us: Youth Part 2	DAY6	EP	Korean	Studio J	-	JYPK 1047
December 12	The Year of "Yes"	TWICE	EP (reissue)	Korean	Div 3	-	JYPK 1046
December 17	"I Won't Let You Go"	GOT7	Digital single	Japanese	Div 2	Epic JYP	-
December 19	Me (Japanese Edition)	Nichkhun	EP	English, Japanese	Div 1	Epic JYP	ESCL 5151~4
December 26	BDZ Repackage	TWICE	Studio album (reissue)	Japanese	Div 3	Warner Music Japan	WPZL-31564~5

=== 2019 ===
List of releases
Release Date	Title	Artist	Type	Language	Label Division	Licensee or Co-Label	Catalog Number(s)
January 25	Two	Lee Jun-ho	Studio album	Korean	Div 1	-	JYPK 1053
January 30	I Won't Let You Go	GOT7	EP	Japanese	Div 2	Epic JYP	ESCL 5168~79
February 9	"This Small Hand" (꽉 잡은 이 손)	J.Y. Park	Digital single	Korean	Div 2	-	-
February 12	It'z Different	ITZY	Digital single album	Korean	Div 2	-	-
February 18	Me	Nichkhun	EP	Korean	Div 1	-	JYPK 1055
March 5	Focus	JUS2	EP	Korean	Div 2	-	JYPK 1050
March 6	#Twice2	TWICE	Compilation album	Japanese	Div 3	Warner Music Japan	WPCL 13019~20; WPZL 31583~4
March 18	Our Love Is Great	Yerin Baek	EP	Korean, English	Studio J	-	JYPK 1065
March 25	Clé 1: Miroh	Stray Kids	EP	Korean	Div 1	-	JYPK 1059
March 29	"Oh My Gosh"	BOY STORY	Single	Chinese	JYP China	NCC Entertainment	-
April 10	Focus (Japanese Edition)	JUS2	EP	Japanese	Div 2	Epic JYP	-
April 22	Fancy You	TWICE	EP	Korean	Div 3	-	JYPK 1061
April 26	"Nothing But You"	Junho	Digital single	Japanese	Div 1	Epic JYP	-
May 20	Spinning Top	GOT7	EP	Korean	Div 2	-	JYPK 1066
June 19	Cle 2: Yellow Wood	Stray Kids	EP	Korean	Div 1	-	JYPK 1073
July 15	The Book of Us: Gravity	DAY6	EP	Korean	Studio J	-	JYPK 1075
July 17	"Happy Happy"	TWICE	Single	Japanese	Div 3	Warner Music Japan	WPCL 13052~3; WPZL 31615~8
July 24	"Breakthrough"	TWICE	Single	Japanese	Div 3	Warner Music Japan	WPCL 13054; WPZL 31621~4
July 29	It'z Icy	ITZY	EP	Korean	Div 2	-	JYPK 1076
July 26	"Too Busy"	BOY STORY featuring Jackson Wang	Digital single	Chinese	JYP China	NCC Entertainment	-
July 31	Love Loop	GOT7	EP	Japanese	Div 2	Sony Music Japan	ESCL 5260~7
September 18	2PM Best in Korea 2 ~2012–2017~	2PM	Compilation album	Korean	Div 1	Epic JYP	ESCL 5285~9
September 23	Feel Special	TWICE	EP	Korean	Div 3	-	JYPK 1094
October 9	"Double Knot"	Stray Kids	Single	Korean	Div 1	-	-
October 21	"Sing For U"	GOT7	Digital single	Japanese	Div 2	Sony Music Japan	-
October 22	The Book of Us: Entropy	DAY6	Studio album	Korean	Studio J	-	JYPK 1101
October 23	"Finale"	DAY6	Digital single	Japanese	Studio J	Warner Music Japan	-
October 30	Start of the End	Yubin	Digital single album	Korean	Studio J	-	-
November 4	Call My Name	GOT7	EP	Korean	Div 2	-	JYPK 1100
November 20	&Twice	TWICE	Studio album	Japanese	Div 3	Warner Music Japan	WPCL 13122~3; WPZL-31685~9
November 30	"Fever"	J.Y. Park featuring Superbee & Bibi	Digital single	Korean	Div 2	-	-
December 4	The Best Day2	DAY6	Compilation album	Japanese	Studio J	Warner Music Japan	WPCL 12883; WPZL 31470~1
December 9	Clé: Levanter	Stray Kids	EP	Korean	Div 1	-	JYPK 1103
December 18	Love Loop -Sing For U Special Edition-	GOT7	EP (reissue)	Japanese	Div 2	Sony Music Japan	ESCL 5308
December 23	Fever	J.Y. Park featuring Superbee & Bibi	Digital single album	Korean	Div 2	-	-
December 25	Story Of...	Nichkhun	EP	English, Japanese	Div 1	Sony Music Japan	ESCL 5312
December 26	"Mixtape: Gone Days"	Stray Kids	Digital single	Korean	Div 1	-	-

== 2020s ==
Used to note fully licensed releases by active JYP artists that do not feature the JYP Ent. label or list it in the copyright credits

=== 2020 ===
List of releases
Release Date	Title	Artist	Type	Language	Label Division	Licensee or Co-Label	Catalog Number(s)
January 7	I=U=WE: 序	BOY STORY	EP	Chinese	JYP China	NCC Entertainment	-
January 11	"Outta My Head"	Mark Tuan	Digital single	Chinese	Div 2	-	-
January 24	Step Out of Clé	Stray Kids	Digital single album	English	Div 1	-	-
January 31	"My Pace (Japanese Version)"	Stray Kids	Digital single	Japanese	Div 1	Sony Music Japan	-
February 5	&Twice (Repackage)	TWICE	Studio album (reissue)	Japanese	Div 3	Warner Music Japan	WPCL-13163; WPZL-31720~1
February 18	"Double Knot (Japanese Version)"	Stray Kids	Digital single	Japanese	Div 1	Sony Music Japan	-
March 9	It'z Me	ITZY	EP	Korean, English	Div 2	-	JYPK 1131
March 13	The Best of 2PM in Japan 2011–2016	2PM	Compilation album	Japanese	Div 1	Epic Records Japan	ESCL 5347~8
March 18	SKZ2020	Stray Kids	Compilation album	Japanese, Korean	Div 1	Epic Records Japan	ESCL 5370~5
March 25	"Mixtape: On Track"	Stray Kids	Digital single	Korean	Div 1	-	-
April 20	Dye	GOT7	EP	Korean	Div 2	-	JYPK 1145
May 11	The Book of Us: The Demon	DAY6	EP	Korean	Studio J	-	JYPK 1152
May 13	"Top" (Korean Version)	Stray Kids	Digital single	Korean	Div 1	-	-
May 20	"Top" (English Version)	Stray Kids	Digital single	English	Div 1	-	-
June 1	More & More	TWICE	EP	Korean	Div 3	-	JYPK 1154
June 1	"Change"	BOY STORY	Digital single	Chinese	JYP China	NCC Entertainment	-
June 3	"Top" (Japanese Version)	Stray Kids	Single	Japanese	Div 1	Epic Records Japan	ESSL 2 (Cassette); ESCL 5430~5
June 17	Go Live	Stray Kids	Studio album	Korean	Div 1	-	JYPK 1144
June 30	Make You Happy	NiziU	Digital EP	Japanese	JYP Japan	Sony Music Entertainment Japan	-
July 8	"Fanfare"	TWICE	Single	Japanese	Div 3	Warner Music Japan	WPCL-13203; WPZL 31750~1
August 12	"When We Disco"	J.Y. Park and Sunmi	Digital single	Korean	Div 2	-	-
August 17	Not Shy	ITZY	EP	Korean	Div 2	-	JYPK 1171
August 21	"More & More" (English version)	TWICE	Digital single	English	Div 3	-	-
August 31	The Book of Us: Gluon	DAY6 (Even of Day)	EP	Korean	Studio J	-	JYPK 1174
September 14	In Life	Stray Kids	Studio album (reissue)	Korean	Div 1	-	JYPK 1172
September 16	#Twice3	TWICE	Compilation album	Japanese	Div 3	Warner Music Japan	WPCL-13227~8; WPZL-31773~4
October 26	Eyes Wide Open	TWICE	Studio album	Korean	Div 3	-	JYPK 1180
November 4	ALL IN	Stray Kids	EP	Japanese	Div 1	Epic Records Japan	ESCL 5460~6
November 18	"Better"	TWICE	Single	Japanese	Div 3	Warner Music Japan	WPCL-13246; WPZL-31785~6
November 26	"ALL IN (Korean Version)"	Stray Kids	Digital single	Korean	Div 1	-	-
November 27	I=U=WE: 我	BOY STORY	EP	Chinese	JYP China	NCC Entertainment	-
November 30	Breath of Love: Last Piece	GOT7	Studio album	Korean	Div 2	-	JYPK 1197
November 30	"I Can't Stop Me" (English version)	TWICE	Digital single	English	Div 3	-	-
December 2	"Step and a Step"	NiziU	Single	Japanese	JYP Japan	Epic Records Japan	ESCL-5474; ESC8-70~8
December 9	20 Minutes	Jun. K	EP	Korean	Div 1	-	JYPK 1199
December 15	"Nevermind"	Yaochen	Digital single	Chinese	JYP China	FANLING ENTERTAINMENT	-
December 18	"Cry for Me"	TWICE	Digital single	Korean	Div 3	-	-

=== 2021 ===
List of releases
Release Date	Title	Artist	Type	Language	Label Division	Licensee or Co-Label	Catalog Number(s)
January 22	Not Shy (English Version)	ITZY	Digital single album	English	Div 2	-	-
March 10	This Is Not a Song	Jun. K	EP	Japanese	Div 1	Epic Records Japan	ESCL 5386~7
March 20	"Trust Me (Midzy)"	ITZY	Digital single	Korean, English	Div 2	-	-
April 7	"Take a Picture" / "Poppin' Shakin'"	NiziU	Single album	Japanese	JYP Japan	Sony Music Japan	ESCL-5517; ESC8-80~8
April 19	The Book of Us: Negentropy	DAY6	EP	Korean	Studio J	-	JYPK 1230
April 30	Guess Who	ITZY	EP	Korean	Div 2	-	JYPK 1227
May 12	"Kura Kura"	TWICE	Single	Japanese	Div 3	Warner Music Japan	WPCL-13289~90; WPZL-31855~6
May 14	"In the Morning (English Version)"	ITZY	Digital single	English	Div 2	-	-
June 11	Taste of Love	TWICE	EP	Korean	Div 3	-	JYPK 1231
June 26	"Mixtape: Oh"	Stray Kids	Digital single	Korean	Div 1	-	-
June 28	Must	2PM	Studio album	Korean	Div 1	-	JYPK 1260
June 28	"NO ANSWER"	Yaochen	Digital single	Chinese	JYP China	FANLING ENTERTAINMENT	-
July 5	Right Through Me	DAY6 (Even of Day)	EP	Korean	Studio J	-	JYPK 1265
July 5	"Super Summer"	NiziU	Digital single	Japanese	JYP Japan	Sony Music Japan	-
July 16	"Cookin' Fo Ya"	BOY STORY	Digital single	Chinese	JYP China	NCC Entertainment	-
July 28	Perfect World	TWICE	Studio album	Japanese	Div 3	Warner Music Japan	WPCL-13299~300; WPZL-31871
August 23	Noeasy	Stray Kids	Studio album	Korean	Div 1	-	JYPK 1271
September 1	WHAT'z ITZY	ITZY	Digital compilation	Korean	Div 2	Warner Music Japan	-
September 6	Eternal	Young K	EP	Korean	Studio J	-	JYPK 1285
September 14	I=U=WE:U	BOY STORY	Digital single	Chinese	JYP China	NCC Entertainment	-
September 23	"Thunderous (Japanese Version)"	Stray Kids	Digital single	Japanese	Div 1	Sony Music Japan	-
September 24	Crazy in Love	ITZY	Studio album	Korean	Div 2	-	JYPK 1263
September 27	"Out of the Blue"	Dowoon featuring Song Heejin	Digital single	Korean	Studio J	-	-
September 29	With Me Again	2PM	EP	Japanese	Div 1	Epic Records Japan	ESCL 5567~9
October 1	"The Feels"	TWICE	Digital single	English	Div 3	-	-
October 6	"Scars"	Stray Kids	Digital single	Japanese	Div 1	Sony Music Japan	-
October 13	"Scars" / "Thunderous (Japanese Version)"	Stray Kids	Single album	Japanese	Div 1	Epic Records Japan	ESCL 5571~7; ESC8 96
October 22	Crazy In Love Special Edition	ITZY	EP (reissue)	Korean	Div 2	-	JYPK 1280
November 12	Formula of Love: O+T=<3	TWICE	Studio album	Korean	Div 3	-	JYPK 1276
November 15	"Bad Influence"	Bernard Park	Digital single	Korean	Studio J	-	-
November 24	U	NiziU	Studio album	Japanese	JYP Japan	Epic Records Japan	ESCL 5586~9
November 29	Christmas EveL	Stray Kids	EP	Korean, English	Div 1	-	JYPK 1310
December 2	!:EM	Yaochen	Digital EP	Chinese	JYP China	FANLING ENTERTAINMENT	-
December 6	"Happy Death Day"	Xdinary Heroes	Digital single	Korean	Studio J	-	-
December 15	"Doughnut"	TWICE	Single	Japanese	Div 3	Warner Music Japan	WPCL-13347; WPCL-13353; WPZL-31920
December 17	Formula of Love: O+T=<3 (Result File Version)	TWICE	Studio album (reissue)	Korean	Div 3	-	JYPK 1309
December 22	IT'z ITZY	ITZY	Compilation album	Japanese, Korean	Div 2	Warner Music Japan	WPCL-13343
December 23	SKZ2021	Stray Kids	Digital compilation	Korean	Div 1	-	-
December 30	"LITHOPS"	Yaochen	Digital single	Chinese	JYP China	FANLING ENTERTAINMENT	-

=== 2022 ===
Released	Title	Artist	Type	Language
February 7	Pilmography	Wonpil	Studio album	Korean
February 22	Ad Mare	Nmixx	Single album	Korean
March 16	#Twice4	Twice	Compilation album	Japanese
March 18	Oddinary	Stray Kids	EP	Korean
April 6	"Voltage"	Itzy	Single	Japanese
April 12	"Asobo"	NiziU	Single	Japanese
April 25	"Wanna Get Worse"	Yao Chen	Single	Chinese
April 25	"Not Good"	Yao Chen	Single	Chinese
May 8	"Feel My Love"	Yao Chen	Single	Chinese
June 22	Circus	Stray Kids	EP	Japanese
June 24	Im Nayeon	Nayeon	EP	Korean
July 8	"Drinkin' You"	Yao Chen	Single	Chinese
July 15	Checkmate	Itzy	EP	Korean
July 20	"Clap Clap"	NiziU	Single	Japanese
July 20	Hello, World!	Xdinary Heroes	EP	Korean
July 27	Celebrate	Twice	Studio album	Japanese
July 29	"We Belong Tonight"	Yao Chen	Single	Chinese
August 1	"Mixtape: Time Out"	Stray Kids	Single	Korean
August 26	Between 1&2	Twice	EP	Korean
September 3	We	Boy Story	Studio album	Chinese
September 19	Entwurf	Nmixx	Single album	Korean
October 5	"Blah Blah Blah"	Itzy	Single	Japanese
October 7	Maxident	Stray Kids	EP	Korean
October 12	"Hush Down"	Yao Chen	Single	Chinese
October 21	"Boys Like You"	Itzy	Single	English
November 11	Overload	Xdinary Heroes	EP	Korean
November 18	Groove Missing	J.Y. Park	Single album	Korean
November 23	"Funky Glitter Christmas"	Nmixx	Single	Korean
November 30	Cheshire	Itzy	EP	Korean
December 14	"Blue Moon"	NiziU	Single	Japanese
December 21	SKZ-Replay	Stray Kids	Compilation album	Korean
December 31	"Christmas Snow" (白色信封)	Yao Chen and Nichkhun	Single	Chinese, English

=== 2023 ===
Released	Title	Artist	Type	Language
January 1	"Friends"	Boy Story	Single	Chinese
January 20	"Moonlight Sunrise"	Twice	Single	English
February 23	The Sound	Stray Kids	Studio album	Japanese
March 8	"Paradise"	NiziU	Single	Japanese
March 10	Ready to Be	Twice	EP	Korean, English
March 13	"Young, Dumb, Stupid"	Nmixx	Single	Korean
March 20	Expérgo	Nmixx	EP	Korean
March 23	"Problem"	Yaochen	Single	Chinese
April 26	Deadlock	Xdinary Heroes	EP	Korean
April 27	"Yaochen"	Yaochen	Single	Chinese
April 28	"What's Poppin"	Boy Story	Single	Chinese
May 8	Yaochen	Yaochen	Studio album	Chinese
May 31	"Hare Hare"	Twice	Single	Japanese
June 2	5-Star	Stray Kids	Studio album	Korean, English
June 23	"Better Day"	Young K	Single	Korean
July 3	"Roller Coaster"	Nmixx	Single	Korean
July 11	A Midsummer Nmixx's Dream	Nmixx	Single album	Korean
July 19	Coconut	NiziU	Studio album	Japanese
July 26	Masterpiece	MiSaMo	EP	Japanese
July 31	Kill My Doubt	Itzy	EP	Korean
August 18	Zone	Jihyo	EP	Korean
August 18	Z.I.P	Boy Story	EP	Chinese
August 23	"Can I"	Junho	Single	Japanese
August 25	"Let It Be Summer"	Young K	Single	Korean
September 1	"Fly High"	Changbin	Single	Korean
September 4	Letters with Notes	Young K	Studio album	Korean
September 6	Social Path / Super Bowl (Japanese Ver.)	Stray Kids	EP	Japanese
September 22	SeVit (New Light)	Vcha	EP	English
October 11	Livelock	Xdinary Heroes	EP	Korean
October 18	Ringo	Itzy	Studio album	Japanese
October 30	Press Play	NiziU	Single album	Korean
November 3	"Can I" (Korean version)	Junho	Single	Korean
November 10	Rock-Star	Stray Kids	EP	Korean
November 20	"Changed Man"	J. Y. Park	Single	Korean
November 22	The Remixes	Twice	Remix album	Korean, English
November 29	"Nothing But You" (Korean version)	Junho	Single	Korean
December 1	"Ready for the World"	Vcha	Single	English
December 4	"Soñar (Breaker)"	Nmixx	Single	Korean
December 18	"Miracle"	Nexz	Single	Japanese, Korean

=== 2024 ===
Released	Title	Artist	Type	Language
January 8	Born to Be	Itzy	EP	Korean
January 15	Fe3O4: Break	Nmixx	EP	Korean
January 17	"When We Meet Again"	Lee Jun-ho	Single	Korean
January 26	"Girls of the Year"	Vcha	Single	English
February 2	"I Got You"	Twice	Single	English
February 3	Ji	Boy Story	EP	Chinese
February 3	"Memories"	NiziU	Single	Japanese
February 20	"Like Magic"	J. Y. Park, Stray Kids, Itzy, Nmixx	Single	Korean
February 23	With You-th	Twice	EP	Korean
March 14	"Sweet Nonficition"	NiziU	Single	Japanese
March 15	"Only One"	Vcha	Single	English
March 18	Fourever	Day6	EP	Korean
April 3	"Command C+Me" (Korean version)	Jun. K	Single	Korean
April 12	"Why?"	Stray Kids	Single	Japanese
April 29	L.I.V.E.	Yaochen	EP	Chinese
April 30	Troubleshooting	Xdinary Heroes	Studio albums	Korean
May 10	"Lose My Breath"	Stray Kids featuring Charlie Puth	Single	English
May 15	"Algorhythm"	Itzy	Single	Japanese
May 20	Ride the Vibe	Nexz	Single album	Korean
June 3	Open Beta v6.1	Xdinary Heroes	Single	Korean
June 14	Na	Nayeon	EP	Korean
July 8	Open Beta v6.2	Xdinary Heroes	Single	Korean
July 12	Up	Boy Story	EP	Chinese
July 17	Dive	Twice	Studio album	Japanese
July 19	Ate	Stray Kids	EP	Korean
July 23	"Slash"	Stray Kids	Single	Korean
July 24	Rise Up	NiziU	EP	Japanese
August 5	Open Beta v6.3	Xdinary Heroes	Single	Korean
August 19	Fe3O4: Stick Out	Nmixx	EP	Korean
August 21	Ride the Vibe (Japanese ver.) / Keep on Moving	Nexz	EP	Japanese
August 26	"Paint This Love"	Jun. K	Single	Korean
September 2	Band Aid	Day6	EP	Korean
September 6	Aboutzu	Tzuyu	EP	Korean, English
September 9	Open Beta v6.4	Xdinary Heroes	Single	Korean
September 23	"Keep On Moving" (Korean version)	Nexz	Single	Korean
October 7	"Night"	Stray Kids	Single	Korean, Japanese, English
October 7	"Falling Up"	Stray Kids	Single	Korean, Japanese, English
October 11	"Soñar" (Spanish version)	Nmixx	Single	Spanish
October 14	Live and Fall	Xdinary Heroes	EP	Korean
October 15	Gold	Itzy	EP	Korean
November 4	"Easy Lover"	J. Y. Park	Single	Korean
November 5	30	Sungjin	Studio album	Korean
November 6	Haute Couture	MiSaMo	EP	Japanese
November 13	Giant	Stray Kids	Studio album	Japanese
November 18	Nallina	Nexz	EP	Korean
November 26	Better with You	Yaochen	EP	Chinese
December 6	Strategy	Twice	EP	English, Korean
December 13	Hop	Stray Kids	Mixtape	Korean

=== 2025 ===
Released	Title	Artist	Type	Language
January 20	Flip It, Kick It!	KickFlip	EP	Korean
February 4	Smoke Point	All(H)Ours	EP	Korean
February 5	Awake	NiziU	EP	Japanese
March 4	"High Horse"	Nmixx	Single	Korean
March 10	Air	Yeji	EP	Korean
March 17	Fe3O4: Forward	Nmixx	EP	Korean
March 19	O/N	Jun. K	EP	Japanese
March 21	Mixtape: Dominate	Stray Kids	Single album	Korean
March 24	Beautiful Mind	Xdinary Heroes	EP	Korean
March 31	Love Line	NiziU	Single album	Korean
April 28	O-RLY	Nexz	EP	Korean
April 28	Eyes on You	Yao Chen	EP	Chinese
April 30	"See You Today"	CIIU	Single	Chinese
May 7	"Maybe Tomorrow"	Day6	Single	Korean
May 14	#Twice5	Twice	Compilation album	Japanese
May 26	Kick Out, Flip Now!	KickFlip	EP	Korean
May 26	Love Line (Japanese Ver.) / Shining Day	NiziU	EP	Japanese
June 9	Girls Will Be Girls	Itzy	EP	Korean
June 18	Hollow	Stray Kids	EP	Japanese
June 23	"Simple Dance"	Jang Wooyoung	Single	Korean
July 7	"Fire (My Sweet Misery)"	Xdinary Heroes	Single	English
July 11	This Is For	Twice	Studio album	English, Korean
July 16	One Bite	Nexz	EP	Japanese
August 21	Our Departure	CIIU	EP	Chinese
August 22	Karma	Stray Kids	Studio album	Korean
August 27	Enemy	Twice	Studio album	Japanese
August 29	"Commas"	Girlset	Single	English
September 1	Dear My Muse	Jun. K	EP	Korean
September 5	The Decade	Day6	Studio album	Korean
September 9	VCF	All(H)Ours	EP	Korean
September 12	Lil Fantasy Vol. 1	Chaeyoung	Studio album	Korean
September 15	I'm Into	Jang Wooyoung	EP	Korean
September 17	"Freak Show"	Youngbin	Single	Korean
September 22	My First Flip	KickFlip	EP	Korean
October 8	Collector	Itzy	Studio album	Japanese
October 10	Ten: The Story Goes On	Twice	Studio album	English, Korean
October 13	Blue Valentine	Nmixx	Studio album	Korean
October 24	Lxve to Death	Xdinary Heroes	EP	Korean
October 27	Beat-Boxer	Nexz	EP	Korean
November 5	"Happy Hour"	J. Y. Park and Kwon Jin-ah	Single	Korean
November 10	Tunnel Vision	Itzy	EP	Korean
November 14	"Little Miss"	Girlset	Single	English
November 19	New Emotion	NiziU	Studio album	Japanese
November 21	Do It	Stray Kids	Mixtape	Korean
December 15	"Lovin' the Christmas"	Day6	Single	Korean
December 22	"Like U"	CIIU	Single	Chinese
December 24	3650.zip	Jang Wooyoung	Compilation album	Japanese

=== 2026 ===
Released	Title	Artist	Type	Language
January 20	From KickFlip, To WeFlip	KickFlip	Single album	Korean
January 21	"Just Like a Dream"	Dodree	Single	Korean
February 4	Play	MiSaMo	Studio album	Japanese
February 26	"Tic Tic"	Nmixx featuring Pabllo Vittar	Single	Spanish, English
March 6	"Tweak"	Girlset	Single	English
March 9	"Twenty"	KickFlip	Single	Korean
March 16	No Doubt	All(H)Ours	EP	Korean
March 23	Ice Cream	Yuna	EP	Korean
March 25	"Stay"	Stray Kids	Single	Korean
March 25	"X Room"	Xdinary Heroes	Single	Korean
March 30	Unpiltered	Wonpil	EP	Korean
April 1	Good Girl but Not for You	NiziU	EP	Japanese
April 9	My First Kick	KickFlip	EP	Korean
April 13	"Outta My Way"	Yaochen featuring Kun of WayV	Single	Chinese
April 13	1.Got Hooked: An Addictive Symphony	Modyssey	Single album	Korean, Chinese
April 17	Dead And	Xdinary Heroes	EP	Korean
April 27	"Roll the Dice"	Yaochen	Single	Chinese
April 27	Mmchk	Nexz	Single album	Korean
May 11	"Check Yaoself"	Yaochen	Single	Chinese
May 11	Heavy Serenade	Nmixx	EP	Korean
May 18	"Hold On"	Yaochen	Single	Chinese
May 18	Motto	Itzy	EP	Korean
May 25	Roll the Dice	Yaochen	EP	Chinese
June 15	"Midnight Ticket"	Jun.K	Single	Korean
June 24	"Run It"	Stray Kids	Single	Korean
June 24	"Hawwah"	Dodree	Single	Korean
June 24	Hellmate	Nexz	EP	Japanese
June 26	"Listen"	Baek A-yeon	Single	Korean
July 1	Portfolio	NiziU	Compilation album	Japanese
July 17	"Chat"	Girlset	Single	English
July 22	"Hungry (Side A)"	Ourbirthday	Single	Korean
July 23	"Wet"	J.Y. Park	Single	Korean
July 27	Youngest	Young K	Studio album	Korean
August 1	SKZ-Replay 2026 Pt.1	Stray Kids	Compilation album	Korean
August 7	This & That	Stray Kids	EP	Korean
August 17	"Your Lips"	Jun.K featuring Wendy	Single	English, Korean
August 18	Closer To 'You'	CIIU	EP	Chinese
August 19	Our Birthday	Ourbirthday	Single album	Korean
August 24	Saucin'	Nexz	EP	Korean
August 26	#Best 2015–2025	Twice	Compilation album	Korean, Japanese
September 10	Unbound	All(H)Ours	EP	Korean
September 28	Sour Grapes	NiziU	EP	Korean
September 28	"Puzzle Piece"	KickFlip	Single	Korean
October 6	Kick Off The Wall Pt.1	KickFlip	EP	Korean
October 12	Impulse	Xdinary Heroes	EP	Korean
October 12	2.Multitude: How We Bloom	Modyssey	EP	Korean, Chinese
October 19	Strange Muse	Nmixx	EP	Korean
November 9	Lovesick	Chaeryeong	EP	Korean
November 25	Suiatsu	Stray Kids	EP	Japanese
