= Lee Jun-ho discography =

Lee Jun-ho (born January 25, 1990), mononymously known as Junho, is a South Korean singer, songwriter, dancer, composer and actor. He is a member of the South Korean boy band 2PM.

As a solo artist, he has released two Korean studio albums and an extended play, as well as a Japanese compilation album and seven extended plays.

== Albums ==
=== Studio albums ===
Title	Album details	Peak chart positions			Sales
Title	Album details	KOR	JPN	JPN Hot	Sales
One	Released: September 14, 2015 (KOR), September 30, 2015 (JPN); Label: JYP Entertainment, Epic Records Japan (JPN); Format: CD, digital download, streaming audio; Track listing: 1. Fire; 2. SO GOOD; 3. Don't tease me 4. Don't Go Home; 5. Close My Eyes; 6. Like a Star; 7. Crush; 8. INSANE; 9. Good Life 4 Me; 10. Pressure; 11. Believe; Track listing (JPN): 1. Fire; 2. So Good; 3. Don't Tease Me; 4. Don't Go Home; 5. Closed Eyes; 6. Like a Star; 7. Crush; 8. Insane; 9. Good Life 4 Me; 10. Pressure; 11. Believe; 12. Nobody Else	4	22	25	KOR: 11,783
Two	Released: January 25, 2019 (KOR), January 29, 2019 (JPN); Label: JYP Entertainment; Format: CD, digital download, streaming audio; Track listing: 1. 상상 (Fancy); 2. FLASHLIGHT; 3. DSMN; 4. 바보(So sorry); 5. 비행기 (Airplane); 6. 독 (On your mind); 7. 마지막으로 (In the end); 8. Ride up 9. CANVAS; 10. Fine; 11. 겨울잠 (Winter Sleep); 12. Next to you	6	31	—	KOR: 16,596
"—" denotes release did not chart.

=== Compilation albums ===
Title	Album details	Peak chart positions			Sales
Title	Album details	KOR	JPN	JPN Hot	Sales
Junho the Best	Released December 5, 2018 (JPN); Label: Epic Records Japan; Format: CD, digital download, streaming audio; Track listing: 1. Kimi no Koe; 2. Like a Star; 3. Feel; 4. Next to You; 5. So Good; 6. Fire; 7. DSMN; 8. Doku on Your Mind; 9. Ice Cream; 10. Canvas; 11. Fine; 12. Winter Sleep; 13. Airplane; 14. Souzou; 15. Darling; 16. Say Yes	—	6	5	
"—" denotes release did not chart.

== Extended plays ==
Title	Album details	Peak chart positions			Sales
Title	Album details	KOR	JPN	JPN Hot (Note: Billboard Japan Hot Albums Chart was launched on June 4, 2015.)	Sales
Kimi no Koe (キミの声)	Released: July 24, 2013 (JPN); Label: Ariola Japan; Format: CD, digital download, streaming audio; Track listing: 1. キミの声; 2. Like a star 3. 目を閉じて; 4. GOOD BYE; 5. I love you 6. Heartbreaker (Version B only); 7. I'M IN LOVE (Version B only); 8. SAY YES (Version B only)	—	3	—	JPN: 67,064
Feel	Released: July 9, 2014 (JPN); Label: Epic Records Japan; Format: CD, digital download, streaming audio; Track listing: 1. FEEL; 2. Dangerous; 3. ずっと; 4. 行かないで (No No No); 5. Next to you 6. Can't let you go (Limited Edition B only); 7. Turn it up (Limited Edition B only); 8. You & Me (Limited Edition B only); 9. FEEL (Instrumental) (Regular Edition Only); 10. Dangerous (Instrumental) (Regular Edition Only); 11. Zutto (Instrumental) (Regular Edition Only); 12. Ikanaide ~No No No~ (Instrumental) (Regular Edition Only); 13. Next to you (Instrumental) (Regular Edition Only)	5	2	—	JPN: 57,666; KOR: 8,198
So Good	Released: July 15, 2015 (JPN); Label: Epic Records Japan; Format: CD, digital download, streaming audio; Track listing: 1. SO GOOD; 2. Fire; 3. Pressure; 4. INSANE; 5. THE LAST NIGHT; 6. SO GOOD (Instrumental); 7. Don't tease me (Limited Edition B only); 8. Good Life (Limited Edition B only); 9. Believe (Limited Edition B only)	—	3	3	JPN: 52,705
DSMN	Released: July 20, 2016 (JPN); Label: Epic Records Japan; Format: CD, digital download, streaming audio; Track listing: 1. HYPER (feat. Jun. K); 2. DSMN; 3. Doku (On your mind); 4. YES; 5. Run to you 6. DSMN (Instrumental); 7. Instant love (Limited Edition B only); 8. Roller coaster (Limited Edition B only); 9. Insomnia (Limited Edition B only); 10. Saigo Ni (Limited Edition only)	—	2	2	JPN: 48,644
2017 S/S	Released: July 26, 2017 (JPN); Label: Epic Records Japan; Format: CD, digital download, streaming audio; Track listing: 1. Ice Cream; 2. Candy; 3. Diamond; 4. Canvas; 5. Fine; 6. Ice Cream (instrumental); 7. Wow -Junho ver.- (Limited Edition B only); 8. Ice Cream (remix; Limited Edition B only); 9. また会える日 (Can We Meet Again?) (Limited Edition B only)	—	2	2	JPN: 46,224
Canvas	Released: September 11, 2017 (KOR); Label: JYP Entertainment; Format: CD, digital download, streaming audio; Track listing: 1. Canvas; 2. Fine; 3. Instant Love; 4. Nobody Else; 5. Wow; 6. Run to You; 7. 어차피 잊을 거면서 (Forget It Anyway)	5	28	—	KOR: 20,254; JPN: 2,080
Winter Sleep	Released: January 25, 2018 (JPN); Label: Epic Records Japan; Format: CD, digital download, streaming audio; Track listing: 1. Winter Sleep; 2. 飛行機(Airplane); 3. Too Late to Tell; 4. Frozen Heart; 5. Torso; 6. Winter Sleep (instrumental); 7. 365 Winter Party ver. (Limited Edition B only); 8. 一緒に過ごした時間(The Time We Spent Together) -Junho ver.- (Limited Edition B only); 9. Winter Sleep -Snowy Night ver.- (Limited Edition B only); 10. Fine Live ver. -Junho (From 2PM) Solo Tour 2017 "2017 S/S"より- (Full Limited Edition only)	—	3	4	JPN: 32,259
Souzou (想像)	Released: July 11, 2018 (JPN); Label: Epic Records Japan; Format: CD, digital download, streaming audio; Track listing: 1. Souzou (想像; Imagination); 2. Flashlight; 3. Ride up 4. What you want 5. Darling; 6. 想像 (Instrumental); 7. どうせ忘れるだろう(Anyway I will forget) (Limited Edition B only); 8. All Day (Limited Edition B only); 9. 時間を超えて(Beyond time) (Limited Edition B only); 10. 想像 -Night ver.- (Full Limited Edition only)	—	1	2	JPN: 40,907
"—" denotes release did not chart.

== Singles ==
Title	Year	Peak chart positions		Album
Title	Year	JPN	JPN Hot	Album
Korean
"Fire"	2015	—	—	One
"Canvas"	2017	—	—	Canvas
"Flashlight"	2019	—	—	Two
"Can I" (Korean ver.)	2023	—	—	Non-album single
"Nothing But You" (Korean ver.)	2023	—	—	Non-album single
"When We Meet Again"	2024	—	—	Non-album single
"Four Seasons (Always)" (사계 (Always))	2026	—	—	Non-album single
Japanese
"Kimi no Koe"	2013	—	—	Kimi no Koe
"Next To You"	2014	—	—	Feel
"So Good"	2015	—	43	So Good
"Fire"	2015	—	—	One ~Japan Special Edition~
"Insomnia"	2016	—	—	DSMN
"Ice Cream"	2017	—	—	2017 S/S
"365" (Winter Party ver.)	2018	—	—	Winter Sleep
"Issyoni Sugoshita Jikan" (Junho ver.)	2018	—	—	Winter Sleep
"Winter Sleep" (Snowy Night ver.)	2018	—	—	Winter Sleep
"Souzou" (想像; Imagine)	2018	—	—	Souzou
"Next to You"	2018	—	—	Junho the Best
"Can I"	2023	6	13	Non-album single
"When We Meet Again"	2024	—	—	Non-album single

== Original soundtrack and collaborations ==
Year	Song Title	Album
2012	"Undefeated" (with Vanness Wu)	Ti Amo Chocolate OST
2013	"My Way to You" (with Taecyeon)	7th Grade Civil Servant OST
2013	"I'm In Love"	Cold Eyes OST
2014	"You're The Right One" (你是对的人) (with Qi Wei)	Love Is Back OST
2015	"Cupid's Arrow" (with Lee Yu-bi)	Twenty OST
2015	"The Signs of LOVE"	私とドリカム2
2015	"M8" (with M.Joon)	M8
2017	"What Words Are Needed" (어떤 말이 필요하니)	Just Between Lovers OST
2025	"Did You See The Rainbow?"	Typhoon Family OST

== Compositions ==
Release date	Album	Artist	Title
June 20, 2011	Hands Up	2PM	Give It To Me
March 14, 2012	2PM Best ~2008–2011 in Korea~	Junho & Wooyoung	Move On
March 31, 2012	Feast of the Gods OST	Lee Jung	Sad Love
July 8, 2012	23, Male, Single	Wooyoung	Be With You
June 6, 2012	Beautiful	2PM	Kimi Ga Ireba (君がいれば; If You Are Here)
November 14, 2012	Masquerade	2PM	Forever; This Is Love
February 13, 2013	Legend of 2PM	Junho	Say Yes
May 6, 2013	Grown	2PM	Back To Square One; Go Back; Love Song
June 19, 2013	Grown (Grand Edition)	2PM	I'm in Love; Just A Feeling
July 24, 2013	Kimi no Koe	Junho	キミの声; Like a Star; Goodbye; 目を闭じて; I Love You; Heartbreaker
January 29, 2014	Genesis of 2PM	2PM	I Want You
January 29, 2014	Genesis of 2PM	Junho	Hey You
July 9, 2014	Feel	Junho	FEEL; ずっと; 行かないで ~No No No~; Next to You; Can't Let You Go; Turn It Up; You & Me
September 29, 2014	Go Crazy! (Grand Edition)	Junho & Nichkhun	Love is True
January 28, 2015	Guilty Love	2PM	365
April 15, 2015	2PM of 2PM	2PM	Everybody; Burning Love
April 15, 2015	2PM of 2PM	Junho	Crush
June 19, 2015	No.5	2PM	Nobody Else
July 15, 2015	So Good	Junho	So Good; Fire; Pressure; Insane; The Last Night; Don't Tease Me; Good Life; Believe
November 28, 2015	Higher	2PM	Chikai No Christmas (誓いのクリスマス)
November 28, 2015	Higher	Junho	So Many Girls
January 5, 2016	Galaxy of 2PM	2PM	一緒に過ごした時間
April 27, 2016	Galaxy of 2PM	2PM	Set Me Free
April 27, 2016	Galaxy of 2PM	Junho & Chansung	Versus
July 20, 2016	DSMN	Junho	Hyper(feat. Jun. K); DSMN; 毒 (On Your Mind); Yes; Run to You; 最後に; Instant Love; Roller Coaster; Insomnia
October 26, 2016	Promise (I'll Be) (Japanese ver.)	2PM	Wow
July 26, 2017	2017 S/S	Junho	Ice Cream; Candy; Diamond; Canvas; Fine; また会える日(Can We Meet Again?)
September 11, 2017	Canvas	Junho	어차피 잊을 거면서 (Forget It Anyway)
January 25, 2018	Winter Sleep	Junho	Winter Sleep; 飛行機 (Airplane); Too Late to Tell; Frozen Heart; Torso
July 11, 2018	Souzou	Junho	Souzou (想像; Imagine); Flashlight; Ride Up; What You Want; Darling; All Day; 時間を超えて (Beyond Time)

== See also ==
- 2PM discography
- List of songs recorded by 2PM
