= Two (Junho album) =

- Regular edition cover

Studio album by Lee Jun-ho
- Released: January 25, 2019
- Genre: K-pop; R&B
- Length: 43:43
- Language: Korean
- Label: JYP Entertainment
- Producer: Lee Jun-ho

Lee Jun-ho chronology
Junho the Best (2018)	Two (2019)

Singles from TWO
- 1. "Flashlight" Released: January 25, 2019

Two is the second Korean studio album by South Korean singer Lee Jun-ho. It was released on January 25, 2019. It was later released in Japan on January 29, 2019.

== Background ==
The album consists of the Korean versions of tracks from Lee's Japanese EPs Feel, DSMN, 2017 S/S, Winter Sleep, and Souzou.

== Track listing ==
All tracks are written by Lee.

Track Listing
No.	Title	Lyrics	Music	Producer	Length
1.	"Fancy"	Lee	Lee, FRANTS	FRANTS	4:04
2.	"Flashlight"	Lee, Hong	Lee, Hong	Hong	3:12
3.	"DSMN"	Lee, Hong	Lee, Hong	Lee	3:08
4.	"So Sorry"	Lee	Lee, Lee Woo Min “collapsedone”	Lee	4:13
5.	"Airplane"	Lee	Lee, Hong	Lee, Hong	3:36
6.	"On Your Mind"	Lee, Hong	Lee, Hong	Lee, Hong	3:36
7.	"In the End"	Lee, Hong	Lee, Hong	Lee, Hong	3:45
8.	"Ride up"	Lee, Hong	Lee, Hong	Lee, Hong	3:19
9.	"Canvas"	Lee	Lee, Hong	Hong	3:31
10.	"Fine"	Lee	Lee, Hong	Lee, Hong	4:06
11.	"Winter Sleep"	Lee	Lee, Hong	Lee, Hong	3:26
12.	"Next to you"	Lee, Hong	Lee, Hong	Lee, Hong	3:49
Total length:					43:43

== Charts ==
Chart (2019)	Peak position
Japanese Oricon Weekly Albums Chart	31
South Korean Gaon Weekly Albums Chart	6
