= Canvas (Junho EP) =

- Regular edition cover

EP by Lee Jun-ho
- Released: September 11, 2017
- Genres: K-pop; R&B
- Length: 20:48
- Language: Korean
- Label: JYP Entertainment
- Producer: Lee Jun-ho

Lee Jun-ho chronology
| 2017 S/S (2017) | Canvas (2017) | Winter Sleep (2018) |

Singles from Canvas
- 1. "Canvas" Released: September 11, 2017

Canvas is the first Korean extended play by South Korean singer Lee Jun-ho. It was released on September 11, 2017.

== Background ==
Canvas was Lee's second Korean release after One (2015). It contained Korean versions of three tracks from his Japanese EPs DSMN and 2017 S/S, as well as a solo recording of the track "Nobody Else", which he produced for 2PM's 2015 album No.5. A Japanese version of the track "Bye Bye" was later released on Lee's 2018 Japanese EP Souzou as a solo recording titled "Douse Wasureru Darou".

== Release and promotion ==
The release was supported by three music videos, including the track "Fine" on September 1, which Lee dedicated to the passing of his pet cat Rambo; "Bye Bye" featuring Cheeze on September 5; and the title track "Canvas".

== Track listing ==
Canvas track listing
| No. | Title | Lyrics | Music | Producer | Length |
|---|---|---|---|---|---|
| 1. | "Canvas" | Lee Jun-ho | Lee, Hong | Lee, Hong Ji-sang | 3:30 |
| 2. | "Fine" | Lee Jun-ho | Lee, Hong | Lee, Hong | 4:05 |
| 3. | "Instant Love" | Lee Jun-ho | Lee, Hong | Lee, Hong | 4:59 |
| 4. | "Nobody Else" | Lee Jun-ho | Lee, Hong | Lee, Hong | 4:10 |
| 5. | "Wow" | Lee Jun-ho | Lee, Hong | Lee, Hong | 3:16 |
| 6. | "Run to you" | Lee Jun-ho | Lee, Hong | Lee, Hong | 3:39 |
| 7. | "Bye Bye" (featuring Cheeze) | Lee Jun-ho | Lee, Hong | Lee | 4:02 |
| Total length: | | | | | 27:31 |

== Charts ==
| Chart (2017) | Peak position |
|---|---|
| Japanese Oricon Weekly Albums Chart | 28 |
| South Korean Gaon Weekly Albums Chart | 5 |
