= Can I (Junho song) =

Single by Lee Jun-ho
- Released: July 21, 2023 (Digital) August 23, 2023 (Physical)
- Genre: J-pop, R&B
- Length: 3:23
- Label: Epic Records Japan
- Songwriters: Lee Junho, Hong Ji-sang, D&H (Purple Night)

Lee Jun-ho singles chronology
"Souzou" (2018)	"Can I" (2023)

Can I is a Japanese single released by South Korean artist Lee Jun-ho. It first premiered digitally on July 21, 2023, in commemoration of the 10th anniversary of his debut as a solo artist.

== Background ==
On May 30, 2019, Lee began his military service as a public service worker. He was discharged on March 20, 2021.

On July 7, 2023, JYP Entertainment announced that Junho would be releasing a special single titled "Can I" on August 23, 2023, and revealed images of the album jacket. This followed the announcement of a solo concert tour titled The Day We Meet Again with six dates in July and August 2023, marking his 10th anniversary as a solo artist. The single would be his first Japanese release since December 2018, following Junho the Best, and his first release featuring new music in five years, following Souzou.

== Track listing ==
Track List
No.	Title	Lyrics	Music	Arrangement	Length
1.	"Can I"	Lee Jun-ho; D&H (Purple Night); Hong Ji-sang	Hong	Hong	3:23
2.	"Can I (Instrumental)"		Hong	Hong	3:20
Total length:					6:43

== Charts ==
=== Weekly charts ===
Chart (2023)	Peak position
Oricon Singles Chart	6
Billboard Japan Hot Albums	13
