= Lee Jun-ho =

South Korean singer and actor (born 1990)

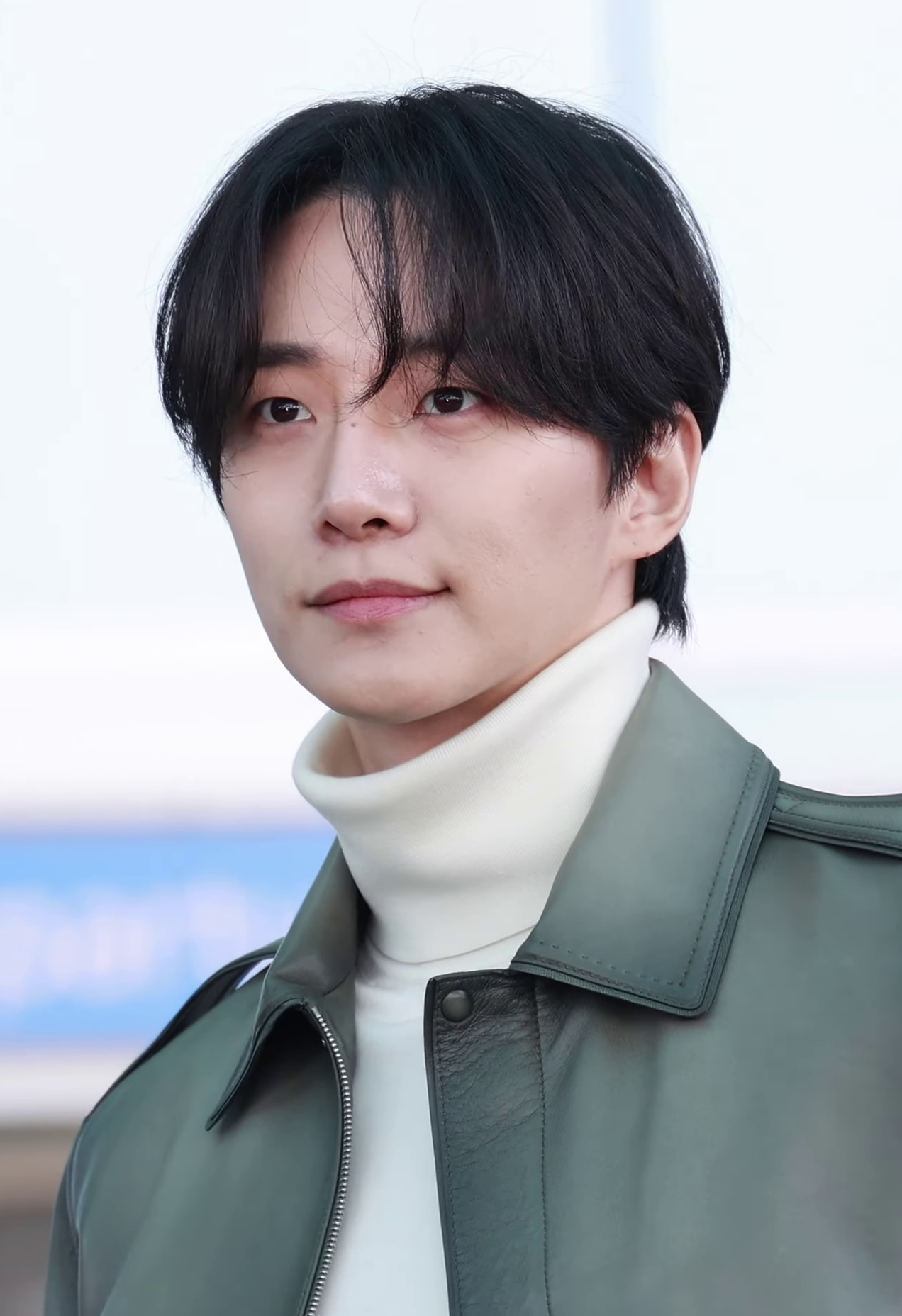
- Lee in 2025
- Born: January 25, 1990 (age 36); Seoul, South Korea
- Education: Howon University (BA); Sejong University (MA in Cinematography)
- Occupations: Singer-songwriter; actor
- Years active: 2008–present
- Agent: O3 Collective
- Musical career
- Genres: K-pop; J-pop; electronic; R&B; hip hop
- Instrument: Vocals
- Labels: O3 Collective; JYP
- Member of: 2PM
- Formerly of: JYP Nation; One Day
- Website: o3collective.kr

Korean name
- Hangul: 이준호
- RR: I Junho
- MR: I Chunho

Signature
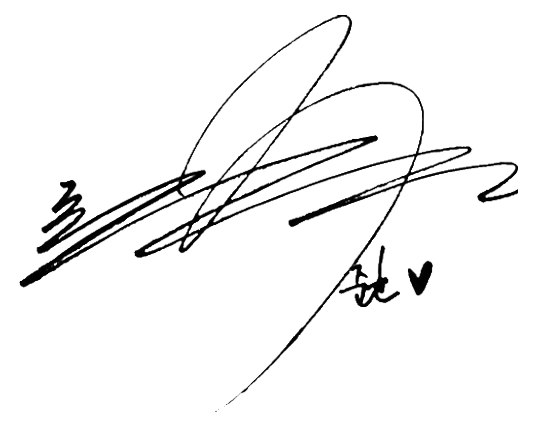

Lee Jun-ho (Korean: 이준호; born January 25, 1990), known mononymously as Junho, is a South Korean singer-songwriter and actor. He rose to prominence as a member of the South Korean boy band 2PM, before making his solo music debut in Japan in 2013. As a solo artist, he released two studio albums, one compilation album and eight extended plays, achieving significant success in Japan.

Lee made his acting debut in the film Cold Eyes (2013), followed by Twenty (2015). He gained recognition for his roles in television series including Good Manager (2017), Rain or Shine (2017–2018), Confession (2019), The Red Sleeve (2021), King the Land (2023) and Typhoon Family (2025). His performance in The Red Sleeve earned him the Baeksang Arts Award for Best Actor – Television.

== Early life and education ==
Lee was inspired to pursue filmmaking after watching the film Shiri in elementary school. However, by the fourth grade, his interests had shifted toward acting. Although he initially enjoyed dancing and singing, he aspired to become an actor and subsequently enrolled in the drama program at Sewon High School. While in high school, Lee was active in the school's theater club and participated in various provincial and poetry competitions.

Lee attended Howon University in Gunsan, South Korea, where he completed his undergraduate studies. He later earned a master's degree in cinematography from Sejong University.

== Career ==
=== Career beginnings ===
In 2006, Lee first gained public attention when he won Superstar Survival. The show began with twelve teenage competitors, who were eliminated one by one over the course of the competition. Lee signed a contract with JYP Entertainment after winning the contest, placing first among 6,500 applicants.

In 2008, he participated in Mnet's Hot Blooded Men, a program that followed the rigorous training of thirteen aspiring trainees competing for a coveted place in the boy band One Day. The program ultimately led to the formation of two boy bands, 2AM and 2PM.

Half a year after the airing of Hot Blooded Men, 2PM made their debut with the single "10 Out of 10" from their first single album, Hottest Time of the Day. The group gained mainstream success in South Korea following the release of their second single album, 2:00PM Time For Change, in 2009.

Despite the group's success, Lee has spoken about his lack of opportunities and recognition early in his career. He recalled that he was often alone in the dormitory while the other members were busy with their scheduled activities. Lee also stated that, despite his interest in acting, he believed JYP Entertainment had no intention of allowing him to pursue it at the time.

=== Solo music career ===
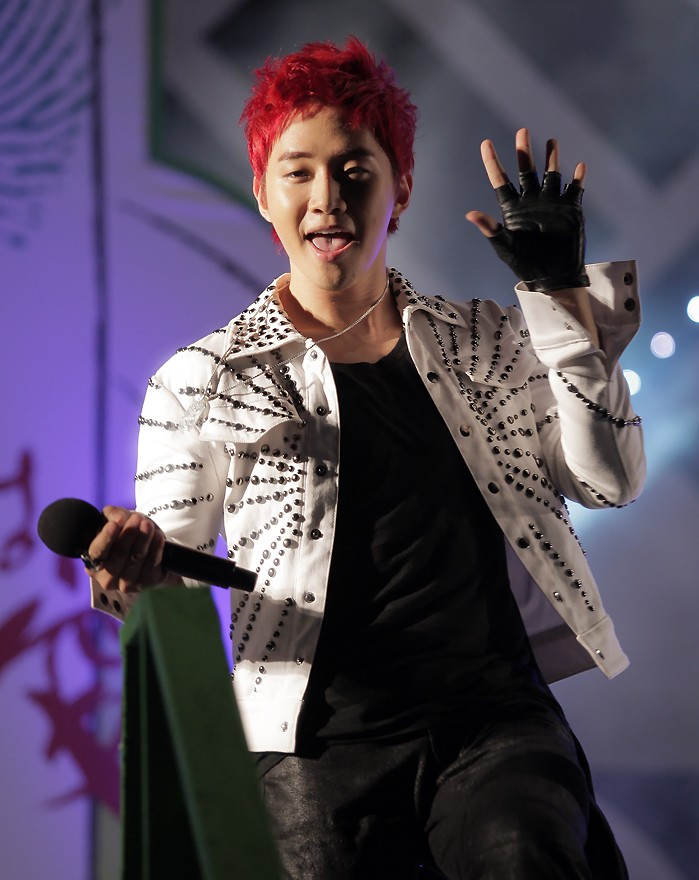
Lee performing in 2011

In 2013, Lee made his debut as a solo artist in Japan with the release of his debut solo EP, Kimi no Koe, for which he served as producer, composer, and lyricist across all tracks. The EP topped Tower Records' daily chart and peaked at number three on Oricon's daily and weekly album charts. On July 9, Lee began his first solo tour, Kimi no Koe, which comprised 12 shows across five cities and concluded on August 29 in Tokyo.

On July 9, 2014, Lee released his second self-composed Japanese EP, Feel. The EP topped Oricon's daily album chart on the day of its release and reached number two on the weekly chart. On July 3, Lee began his second solo Japanese tour, Feel, which encompassed 12 shows across five cities and attracted 50,000 fans. The final show at the Nippon Budokan on August 13 was broadcast live in 38 theaters across 23 prefectures in Japan.

On July 15, 2015, Lee released his third Japanese EP, So Good, which peaked at number three on Oricon's weekly albums chart, with first-week sales exceeding 40,000 copies. The EP was described as demonstrating Lee's growth as an artist, with emotional tracks like "Good Life" and "Pressure" reflecting his personal thoughts and emotions. On July 7, Lee began his 2015 Japanese tour, Last Night, which comprised 15 shows across seven cities and attracted over 55,000 fans. The tour included two performances each at Yokohama Arena and World Memorial Hall. The final show at the World Memorial Hall on August 6 was broadcast live in 41 theaters across 32 cities in Japan.

In September, Lee released his debut studio album in South Korea, One, consisting of Korean versions of eleven previously released self-composed Japanese tracks. For the album's promotion, Lee made his first solo appearances on South Korean music shows, including M Countdown, Music Bank, Show! Music Core and Inkigayo, performing the title track "Fire". He subsequently held two Last Night concerts at the Olympic Hall in Seoul on September 19 and 20.

In July 2016, Lee released his fourth Japanese EP, DSMN. The EP became Lee's first release to top both Oricon and Tower Records' daily albums charts, and peaked at number two on Oricon's weekly albums chart. The pre-release single "DSMN" also gained popularity on a Japanese ringtone platform. Lee held a special fan event, Whispering Summer with Junho ~Acoustic Talk Night~, on August 22. His fourth Japanese tour, Hyper, concluded with two performances at the Yoyogi National Gymnasium on August 24 and 25. Lee was responsible for the concert's overall production, including the setlist, opening video, costume concept, stage sound and lighting. On December 3 and 4, Lee held the special encore concerts Last Hyper Night at the Nippon Budokan, with 20,000 fans in attendance. The concerts were also broadcast live at theaters across Japan.

In July 2017, Lee released his fifth Japanese EP, 2017 S/S, which peaked at number two on Oricon's weekly albums chart. Tower Records ranked it as the second best-selling Japanese release of 2017 by a Korean artist. From July to August, Lee held his fifth Japanese tour, 2017 S/S.

In September 2017, Lee released his first Korean EP, Canvas. Music videos were released for "Fine", which Lee dedicated to his late cat Rambo, "Bye Bye" featuring Cheeze, and the title track "Canvas". Following the EP's release, Lee held a fan event, The Special Day "Canvas", on September 16.

In January 2018, Lee released his sixth Japanese EP, Winter Sleep, departing from the summer release and touring pattern established by his previous five Japanese EPs and accompanying tours, which had earned him the moniker "Lee Natsu" ("Lee Summer"). The title track "Winter Sleep" was released in both Korean and Japanese. The EP topped Oricon's daily albums chart and Tower Records' weekly albums chart, and peaked at number three on Oricon's weekly albums chart. Lee also held his first solo winter tour in Japan, Winter Boy (冬の少年), which comprised nine shows across five cities and concluded with two performances at the Nippon Budokan on February 23 and 24.

On July 11, 2018, Lee released his seventh Japanese EP, Souzou. The EP topped Oricon's daily albums chart with first-day sales of 27,200 copies and became his first release to top Oricon's weekly albums chart. His summer solo tour, Flashlight, began in late June in Nagoya and comprised 12 performances across five cities in Japan. The tour included performances at Nippon Budokan on August 20 and 21 and Osaka Castle Hall on September 5; a scheduled performance at Osaka Castle Hall on September 4 was cancelled due to Typhoon Jebi. On October 6, Lee held his first solo fan meetings, The Special Day "Unforgettable Day" (잊을 수 없는 날), in Seoul.

On December 5, Lee released the Japanese compilation album Junho the Best, consisting of sixteen tracks. From December 6 to 8, he held a concert series of the same name at Nippon Budokan. In Tower Records' year-end list of best-selling Japanese albums by Korean artists, Souzou and Winter Sleep ranked sixth and tenth, respectively. Lee was the only artist with multiple entries and the only solo artist in the top 10.

In January 2019, Lee released his second Korean studio album, Two. On March 23 and 24, he brought the Junho the Best concert series to South Korea with two shows at Olympic Hall in Seoul.

In January 2022, Lee held the fan meetings Junho the Moment in Seoul on January 22 and 23, with the second show also broadcast online via Beyond Live. He subsequently held the fan-concert series Before Midnight at SK Olympic Handball Gymnasium in Seoul from August 12 to 14 and at Nippon Budokan in Tokyo on August 20 and 21. The final show was broadcast live via Stagecrowd and Streaming+ and in theaters across Japan, and marked the 100th solo concert of Lee's career.

After filming King the Land in 2023, Lee began his first arena tour in Japan since completing his military service, The Day We Meet Again (Mata Aeru Hi). The tour comprised six shows, with two performances each in Yokohama, Kobe, and Nagoya, beginning at Pia Arena in Yokohama on July 22 and 23. The final show at Nippon Gaishi Hall in Nagoya on August 27 was streamed online and broadcast live at nine CGV theaters in South Korea. The tour marked the 10th anniversary of Lee's solo debut. To commemorate the anniversary, he released the special Japanese single "Can I". Following the tour, Lee held his first solo fan-meeting tour Junho the Moment 2023 from October 14 to December 10, with eight stops across Asia: Taipei, Macau, Manila, Kuala Lumpur, Jakarta, Hong Kong, Singapore, and Bangkok.

On January 13 and 14, 2024, Lee held concerts at Jamsil Indoor Stadium in Seoul as an extension of The Day We Meet Again tour. A concert film was screened at 50 CGV theaters across South Korea in July to mark the 11th anniversary of his solo debut. On January 17, Lee released the digital single "When We Meet Again", the Korean version of the track "Mata Aeru Hi" (また会える日) from his Japanese EP 2017 S/S. Billboard ranked the song 17th on its list of the best K-pop songs of the first half of 2024.

In early 2025, Lee began his Midnight Sun fan-concert tour, with two shows at Inspire Arena in South Korea on January 25 and 26. The Japanese leg, held at Tokyo Metropolitan Gymnasium on February 9 and 10, attracted over 18,000 fans. He subsequently performanced at NTU Sports Center in Taipei on February 23 and 24. The tour concluded with two shows at Vibra São Paulo in Brazil, on March 1 and 2, marking Lee's first solo concerts outside Asia.

In March, it was announced that Lee would leave JYP Entertainment upon the expiration of his contract on April 15, after seventeen years with the company. JYP Entertainment stated that it would continue to oversee Lee's solo activities in Japan. In April, it was reported that Lee was preparing to establish his own agency. On August 18, Lee launched O3 Collective, whose name represents three key elements: the artist's identity ("One"), originality in content ("Original") and a systematic management structure ("Orbit").

In January 2026, Lee held the fan meeting Stunning Us at Korea University's Hwajeong Gymnasium on January 24 and 25, with the second show streamed globally via Weverse. To mark the occasion, Lee released the digital single "Four Seasons (Always)" (사계 (Always)) on January 26. On 29 March, Lee held his first fan meeting in Shanghai, Lee Junho Fan Meeting in Shanghai: Always. On September 12, Lee held the fan meeting Lee Junho Fan Meeting in Seoul 'Autumn Note' at Kwangwoon University Donghae Culture & Arts Centre in Seoul.

=== Acting career ===
In 2013, Lee made his acting debut in the action thriller Cold Eyes. He auditioned for the film after undergoing shoulder surgery and attended the audition wearing a cast. Despite his condition, the directors and producers were impressed by his enthusiasm, and after three to four auditions, he was cast as a detective. The character, originally nicknamed "Giraffe", was reworked as "Squirrel" to better suit Lee. Director Kim Byung-seo stated that Lee was approached solely as an actor and credited him with developing the "Squirrel" character. Lee also composed and performed "I'm in Love" for the film's soundtrack; its music video was released on July 10.

In 2015, Lee appeared in the martial arts period film Memories of the Sword. That same year, he starred alongside Kim Woo-bin and Kang Ha-neul in the coming-of-age film Twenty as an aspiring cartoonist who takes on several part-time jobs after his family goes bankrupt. Lee said that he drew on his own experiences as a trainee to portray the character, recalling that he had suffered from gastritis due to financial hardship and subsisted on convenience store meals during that period. He also stated that he worked closely with the director to accurately express the character's struggles and emotions. Lee collaborated with co-star Lee Yu-bi on "Cupid's Arrow" for the film's soundtrack.

In 2016, Lee made his television debut in tvN's legal thriller Memory. He portrayed an associate lawyer named Jung Jin, a perfectionist whose strong sense of justice often strains his social life.

In 2017, Lee starred in the hit office comedy drama Good Manager. He received praise for his villainous acting in the drama as the arrogant director of finance and won the Excellence Award for an actor in a mid-length drama at the KBS Drama Awards, marking his first acting accolade. The same year, Lee landed his first lead role in JTBC's romantic melodrama series Rain or Shine. He portrayed a psychologically scarred and physically traumatized survivor of a fatal incident, losing over 7 kilograms for the role. Lee also performed "What Words Are Needed" for the series' soundtrack.

In 2018, Lee was cast in his first Japanese film, Rose and Tulip, written by manga artist Akiko Higashimura, in which he played a dual role. He then starred in SBS's romantic comedy drama Wok of Love as a star chef. The same year, he was cast in the historical comedy film Homme Fatale.

In 2019, Lee starred in tvN's legal drama Confession as a lawyer trying to save his wrongly convicted father from death row. His restrained portrayal of the character received praise, with Lee describing the role as one that required him to convey emotions through subtle expressions and brief dialogue.

In November 2021, following his mandatory military service, Lee starred as Crown Prince Yi San in the historical romance drama The Red Sleeve, alongside Lee Se-young as Royal Consort Uibin Seong. The drama became a critical and popular success, receiving eight awards at the 2021 MBC Drama Awards, where Lee won the Top Excellence Award. His performance earned him Best Actor at the 34th Korea PD Awards in 2022, becoming the first idol-turned-actor to win the category. He also won Best Actor – Television and Most Popular Actor at the 58th Baeksang Arts Awards, becoming the first idol-actor to win in the Best Actor – Television category at the Baeksang Arts Awards. Lee was also the first idol-actor to win the Top Excellence Award for Actor in a Miniseries at the 2022 APAN Star Awards and the first idol-actor to win Grand Prize (Daesang) for Actor of the Year at the 2022 Asia Artist Awards. Lee ranked first among all male idols in the January 2022 brand-reputation rankings published by KBRI. In an interview on You Quiz on the Block, Lee revealed that he received numerous script offers following the reception of The Red Sleeve.

In 2023, Lee starred in the romantic comedy drama King the Land alongside Lim Yoona. Lee said that he wanted to choose a project with a different atmosphere from his previous work and one that would be easy to watch. The drama achieved widespread international popularity, becoming the most-watched non-English show on Netflix during its broadcast run and accumulating the most viewed hours among all shows in the second half of 2023. He ranked first among actors in the July brand-reputation rankings published by KBRI. Lee became the first idol-actor to win the Grand Prize (Daesang) at the APAN Star Awards and retained the Grand Prize (Daesang) for Actor of the Year at the Asia Artist Awards. In the same year, he made cameo appearances in Celebrity, helmed by Confession's director Kim Cheol-kyu, and My Dearest, starring Namkoong Min, his co-star from Good Manager.

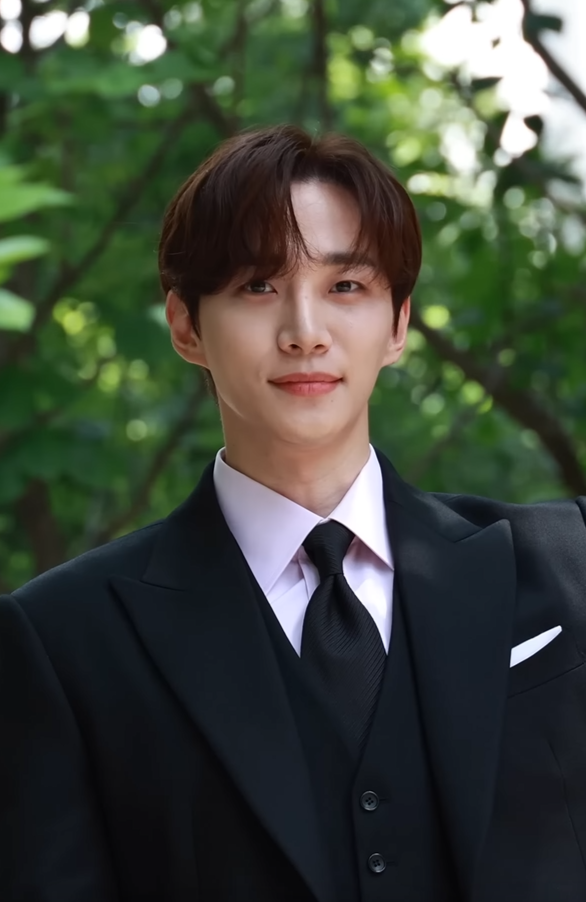
Lee in July 2023

In October 2025, Lee starred in the tvN drama Typhoon Family set during the 1997 financial crisis alongside Kim Min-ha. He also recorded "Did You See The Rainbow?", which served as the series' opening theme. His performance as Kang Tae-poong received positive reviews for its emotional range and restrained portrayal of the character's development, with writer Jang Hyun noting Lee's ability to embody the "nation's son, boyfriend, and CEO". Lee won the Grand Prize for Actor of the Year (TV) at the Asia Artist Awards and the Top Excellence Award for Actor in a Miniseries at the APAN Star Awards. He also received his second nomination in the Best Actor – Television category at the 62nd Baeksang Arts Awards. Lee ranked first among actors in the November brand-reputation rankings published by KBRI. Following the drama, Lee went on a Typhoon Family Drama Fan Meeting tour across four cities: Tokyo, Taipei, Macau and Bangkok.

In November 2025, Lee was confirmed to star in the third installment of the Veteran film series, a sequel to I, the Executioner, with production initially scheduled to begin in the first half of 2026. Lee described his role as "a villain who is evil to the bone". Filming was later postponed indefinitely due to director Ryu Seung-wan's health condition.

In December 2025, Lee starred in Netflix's superhero drama Cashero as Kang Sang-woong, an ordinary civil servant whose superhuman strength is tied to the amount of cash he holds. The drama topped Netflix's global non-English television chart in its second week of release and spent a total of four weeks in the Top 10. It received praise for its reinterpretation of the superhero genre through realism and humor.

In March 2026, Lee was cast in the drama Buy King as Han Ji-yeol, a cold strategist and third-generation heir engaged in a succession war with his uncle, played by Ju Ji-hoon. Filming began in April.

In July 2026, Lee was confirmed to star opposite Hong Hwa-yeon in the tvN fantasy romantic comedy drama Embassy for Foreign Monsters in Korea (working title). He is set to portray Cha Yeon, a water deity and ancient dragon who leads a secret embassy overseeing monsters in South Korea.

=== Songwriting and composition ===
Lee has been involved in songwriting, composition and production for both his solo work and 2PM. He has also written and composed for other artists. As of October 2019, he had 101 compositions registered with the Korea Music Copyright Association (KOMCA), ranking seventh among idols with the most copyrighted songs.

Lee received his first songwriting credit on a 2PM album in 2011 with "Give It to Me" from the group's second studio album, Hands Up. In 2012, he composed "Kimi Ga Ireba" (君がいれば; If You Are Here), the B-side of 2PM's fourth Japanese single, Beautiful, marking his first composition credit on a Japanese release. The song was later included on the group's second Japanese studio album, Legend of 2PM, along with his compositions "This is Love" and "Forever".

In 2012, Lee worked with actress Kim So-eun on MBC's Music and Lyrics, where they created the song "Sad Love". The song charted domestically and was later used as a theme song for the MBC drama Feast of the Gods. He also wrote "Move On" with bandmate Wooyoung for 2PM Best: 2008–2011 in Korea; the song later reached number one on Japan's Recochoku chart. Lee composed "Be With You" for Wooyoung's EP, 23, Male, Single, and collaborated with Mandopop artist Vanness Wu on "Bubai" (不敗; Undefeated) for the soundtrack of the Taiwanese drama Ti Amo Chocolate.

In 2013, Lee made his Japanese solo debut with Kimi no Koe, for which he produced, wrote and composed all tracks. He also contributed "Zero Point", "Love Song" and "Go Back" to 2PM's studio album Grown, and composed and performed "Just a Feeling" and "I'm in Love" for its Grand Edition. Lee later collaborated with Chinese singer and actress Qi Wei on "You're The Right One" (你是对的人) for the soundtrack of the Chinese drama Love Is Back. The music video, featuring both Lee and Qi, reached number one on YinYueTai, China's most visited music video website at the time.

In 2014, Lee contributed "I Want You" to 2PM's third Japanese studio album Genesis of 2PM and collaborated with bandmate Nichkhun on "Love Is True" for the Grand Edition of Go Crazy!. The following year, he contributed "365", "Everybody" and "Burning Love" to the group's Japanese releases, as well as "Nobody Else" to their fifth Korean studio album, No.5. "Nobody Else" was described by Billboard as a "sensual cut with surging synths and slick harmonies". He also produced "Chikai No Christmas" (誓いのクリスマス) and composed and recorded the solo track "So Many Girls" for editions of the group's Japanese single Higher.

In 2016, Lee contributed "The Time We Have Spent Together" (一緒に過ごした時間; Issyoni Sugoshita Jikan) and "Set Me Free" to 2PM's fifth Japanese studio album, Galaxy of 2PM. He also composed and recorded "Versus" with bandmate Chansung for the album's limited edition. In 2017, Lee wrote and composed all tracks on his Japanese EP 2017 S/S and his first Korean EP, Canvas. In 2018, he wrote and composed his solo material for the Japanese EPs Winter Sleep and Souzou. His second Korean studio album, Two, released in 2019, consisted of 12 tracks for which Lee was credited as a lyricist and composer.

Following his military service, Lee resumed his solo music activities. In 2023, he participated in writing the Japanese single "Can I", which was followed by a Korean version later that year. He also wrote and composed "Nothing But You (Korean Ver.)". In January 2024, Lee released "When We Meet Again", the Korean version of his previously released Japanese song "Mata Aeru Hi", for which he was credited as a composer. In January 2026, he released "Four Seasons (Always)" (사계 (Always)), for which he wrote the lyrics and participated in production.

== Other activities ==
=== Endorsements and ambassadorships ===
In 2012, Lee was appointed honorary ambassador of the 24 Hour Famine Program hosted by World Vision.

In May 2014, Lee was selected as a model for South Korean eyewear brand Look Optical.

In August 2021, Lee and bandmate Chansung were appointed as models for Dongwon Tuna. They featured in a commercial styled as the debut music video of a rookie project group named Team Chichi; the song was titled "Oh. My. God. Tuna!" (오. 마이. 갓. 참치!). In October, Lee was selected as the face of French luxury retailer L'Occitane's 2021 Holiday Magic Collection. He was also chosen as the model for South Korean wellness and nutrition brand Paperbag. In November, Lee was appointed as a model for South Korean athleisure brand Xexymix.

In February 2022, Lee was selected as a model for Subway's "Better Choice" advertising campaign. He was also chosen as a model for Domino's Korea alongside Hyeri. In March, he was appointed as the brand ambassador for South Korean ramyeon brand Paldo Bibimmen and Belgian chocolate maker Godiva, the latter in celebration of its 10th anniversary in Korea. In April, he was chosen by Daesang Life Science as a model for its protein brand My Meal. In May, he was selected as the ambassador for South Korean home and kitchen appliance maker Cuckoo Electronics, a role he continued to hold. In July, Lee was chosen as a model by L'Occitane for its 2022 Verbena Summer Paradise campaign. In August, Lee was selected as a model for Lotte Duty Free to promote international tourism. As part of the promotion, he starred in a short drama titled LDF Original Series, released on social media in November 2022.

In January 2023, he was appointed as an ambassador for French luxury goods company Dior in South Korea. In December, he was selected as a model by South Korean organic pet food manufacturer OSP for its brand Indigo Paw.

Lee in June 2025

In February 2024, Lee was selected as a model for South Korean outdoor apparel company NEPA, joining An Yu-jin as the brand's representative. In April, Lee was appointed as the first Korean global ambassador for Swiss luxury watchmaker and jeweller Piaget. He was also selected as the global ambassador for South Korean cosmetics brand The SAEM.

In March 2025, Lee was appointed as the global ambassador for French luxury menswear brand Berluti. In July 2025, Diageo Korea selected Lee as the first brand ambassador of its flagship single malt whisky brand, Singleton.

In January 2026, Lee was selected as the model for K-beauty travel platform Huayanxing (花尊行). In April, Lee was announced as the public ambassador for Busan's '2028 World Design Capital' campaign. He was also revealed as the model for men's contemporary fashion brand Liberclassy. South Korean appliance company Cuckoo, a brand he had been representing domestically since 2022, chose him as its global ambassador. In May, Lee was announced as a global promotional model for Shilla Duty Free. In July, O3 Collective collaborated with South Korean fragrance brand Taylor Scents on the O3 Air Orbit Fragrance Kit, with Lee serving as creative director.

=== Philanthropy ===
Since 2011, Lee has been associated with World Vision through sponsorship of children in Ethiopia and Ghana. In 2012, he was appointed as an ambassador and visited Ethiopia, where he met elephantiasis patients and children he sponsored, including a child named Felmeta, whom he referred to as dongsaeng ("younger brother"). In November 2018, Lee took part in World Vision's "Global 6K for Water" donation run, where he was reunited with Felmeta.

In March 2020, Lee donated 30 million won to support socially vulnerable children affected by the COVID-19 pandemic. In June 2024, Lee joined the Honor Society of the Social Welfare Joint Fundraising Association, whose members have donated more than 100 million won, through Shinhan Financial Group's campaign. In December, Lee donated 100 million won to the Samsung Medical Center to support the treatment of vulnerable children and adolescents. In March 2025, Lee donated 100 million won to help children and residents affected by the wildfires in South Gyeongsang Province and North Gyeongsang Province.

Lee's fans have also made donations to World Vision to mark various occasions, leading to what has been described as "a virtuous cycle of artist and fandom". Following Lee's 2012 visit to Ethiopia, where he was moved by the lack of clean water available to Felmeta and other residents, fans from Korea, Japan and Thailand donated over 26 million won in three weeks in March 2015 to help install drinking water pumps. In 2022, Lee's fan club "DC Inside Lee Junho Gallery" donated 5 million won in commemoration of his birthday. In 2025, the community donated 12.5 million won to support children in crisis, marking its sixth contribution since 2022.

== Personal life ==
=== Military service ===
On May 30, 2019, Lee began his military service as a public service worker. Due to a severe shoulder injury sustained during acrobatics practice in 2010, which required major surgery in 2012, he was deemed unfit for active duty. Lee was discharged on March 20, 2021.

=== Health ===
Lee has sustained several serious injuries during his career. In a 2014 interview, Lee revealed he had torn the labrum in his shoulder while preparing acrobatics for 2PM's comeback with "I'll Be Back" in 2010. He was unable to undergo surgery at the time and filmed the music video for the track a week after the injury while taking up to eight painkillers at a time. In a 2025 interview, Lee stated that eight holes were drilled in his shoulder during the subsequent surgery to repair the tear. Despite continued rehabilitation, Lee did not make a full recovery and was told that he may only be able to regain about 80% functionality in his arm. He was prescribed painkillers when involved in activities that strain his shoulder.

In November 2012, Lee suffered a back injury during a rehearsal for 2PM's What Time Is It? concert tour in Shanghai. He was diagnosed with a spinal fracture, with further examination revealing herniated discs in the third and fifth vertebrae and a fracture in the fourth vertebra. In a 2025 interview, Lee recalled that the spinal injury occurred after he felt a crack during a stage rehearsal. The nerve damage worsened to the point that the pain radiated to his head and he eventually collapsed. He was taken to the hospital, where an X-ray showed that the fourth vertebra was fractured. Although he was required to wear a back brace and had significant swelling, Lee proceeded with the performance and participated in the entire tour. He explained that he viewed performing despite the injury as a promise to his fans who had come to see the performance, while acknowledging that attitudes toward performing with injuries at the time differed from those of today.

In December 2013, Lee injured his index finger while filming an action scene on the set of Memories of the Sword.

In March 2022, JYP Entertainment announced that Lee had been diagnosed with COVID-19.

In February 2025, it was reported that Lee had sustained a grade 2 sprain to his left ankle during dance practice the day before his scheduled Midnight Sun fan-concert at Inspire Arena and was receiving treatment. He subsequently used crutches at the airport while departing for Japan. Despite the injury, Lee performed both scheduled shows of the Japanese leg of his Midnight Sun fan-concert tour, incorporating a cane into his performances.

== Public image ==
From 2013 to 2018, Lee released an extended play and embarked on a concert tour in Japan every summer, earning him the nickname "Lee Natsu" ("Lee Summer") in the country.

In 2020, the title track of 2PM's 2015 album No.5, "My House", climbed back to the top of multiple streaming charts as fancams of Lee's performance of the song became a belated sensation and went viral on YouTube. Despite being in the military at the time, his popularity skyrocketed, and he earned the moniker "Urijib Junho" ("My House Junho").

Lee is widely regarded among the best idol-turned-actors, with him being ranked first among all male idol-actors by a 2023 poll of entertainment insiders. He is the only idol-actor to win Best Actor at the Baeksang Arts Awards and the Korea PD Awards, as well as the Grand Prize (Daesang) for Actor of the Year at the Asia Artist Awards and the APAN Star Awards. Lee has been cited as a role model by many younger idols and actors including Jay B, Jinyoung, Dahyun, Kang Daniel and Kim Jae-won.

== Discography ==
=== Selected discography ===
Year	Studio albums	Extended plays	Compilation albums	Ref.
2013	—	Kimi no Koe	—	
2014	—	Feel	—	
2015	One	So Good	—	
2016	—	DSMN	—	
2017	—	2017 S/S, Canvas	—	
2018	—	Winter Sleep, Souzou	Junho the Best	
2019	Two	—	—	

== Filmography ==
=== Film ===
Year	Title	Role	Notes	Ref.
2011	White: Melody of Death	Music Fever host	Cameo	
2013	Cold Eyes	Squirrel		
2013	The Terror Live	Narrator	Barrier-free version	
2015	Twenty	Dong-woo		
2015	Memories of the Sword	Yul		
2019	Rose and Tulip	Nero / Daewon	Japanese film	
2019	Homme Fatale	Heo-saek		

=== Television series ===
Key
†	Denotes television productions that have not yet been released

Year	Title	Role	Notes	Ref.
2016	Memory	Jung Jin		
2016	Uncontrollably Fond	Himself	Cameo (Episode 4)	
2017	Good Manager	Seo Yul		
2017–2018	Rain or Shine	Lee Kang-doo		
2018	Wok of Love	Seo Poong		
2018	Kioku	Jung Jin	Japanese remake of Memory; Cameo (Episode 12)	
2019	Confession	Choi Do-hyun		
2021–2022	The Red Sleeve	Yi San / King Jeongjo		
2023	King the Land	Gu Won		
2023	Celebrity	Cleaning crew staff	Cameo (Episode 12)	
2023	My Dearest	Man in Gil-chae's dream	Voice cameo (Episode 1)	
2025	Typhoon Family	Kang Tae-pung		
2025	Cashero	Kang Sang-woong		
TBA	Buy King †	Han Ji-yeol		
TBA	Embassy for Foreign Monsters in Korea †	Cha Yeon		

=== Television film ===
Year	Title	Role	Notes	Ref.
2023	Whiteout: A Record of 17 Years	Narrator	ENA documentary	

=== Variety and reality shows ===
Year	Title	Role	Notes	Ref.
2006	Superstar Survival	Contestant	Episodes 1–10	
2009	Hello! Project Korea Auditions	Host	For Hello! Project; with Hwang Chan-sung	
2010	Let's Go! Dream Team Season 2	Main cast		
2011	EBS Global Sharing Project in Ethiopia	Main cast		
2012	Music and Lyrics	Main cast	Episodes 4–6; with Kim So-eun	
2013	Junho's Say Yes ~Friendship~	Host	Episodes 1–26	
2017	King of Mask Singer	Contestant	Watermelon Friend Melon (Episodes 119–120)	
2026	Kian's Bizarre B&B Season 2	Main cast	Episodes 1–10; with Kian84, Kim Yeon-koung, Kazuha	

=== Hosting ===
Year	Title	Notes	Ref.
2010	M Countdown	Rotating host; with Nichkhun, Hwang Chan-sung, Jo Kwon, Jeong Jin-woon, Kang Min-hyuk, Lee Joon, and G.O	
2012	MBC Music Festival	with Shindong	
2021	MBC Gayo Daejejeon	with Lim Yoona and Jang Sung-kyu	
2022	MBC Gayo Daejejeon	with Lim Yoona and Jang Sung-kyu	
2025	Asia Artist Awards	with Jang Won-young	

=== Music video appearances ===
Year	Song title	Artist	Notes	Ref.
2021	"Should've Known" (가까이 있어서 몰랐어)	2AM	with Kim So-hyun	
2021	"No Good in Good-Bye" (잘 가라니)	2AM	with Kim So-hyun	

== Concerts and fan meetings ==
=== Japan tours ===
- Kimi No Koe (2013)
- Feel (2014)
- Last Night (2015)
- Hyper (2016)
- 2017 S/S (2017)
- Winter Boy (2018)
- Flashlight (2018)
- The Day We Meet Again (2023)

=== World tours ===
- Midnight Sun (2025)

=== Fan meeting tours ===
- Junho the Moment (2023)
- Typhoon Family (2025–26)

=== Korea concerts ===
- Last Night in Seoul (2016)
- Junho the Best in Seoul (2019)
- Before Midnight (2022)
- The Day We Meet Again (2024)

=== Japan concerts ===
- Last Hyper Night (2016)
- Junho the Best (2018)
- Before Midnight (2022)

=== Fan meetings ===
- The Special Day "Unforgettable Day" (2018)
- Junho the Moment (2022)
- Stunning Us (2026)
- Always in Shanghai (2026)

== Awards and nominations ==
Lee's accolades include a Japan Gold Disc Award for his solo EP So Good (2016), alongside numerous acting awards and state honours. Among his notable acting awards are the Excellence Award for Actor in a Mid-length Drama at the KBS Drama Awards for Good Manager (2017) and Best Actor – Television at the 58th Baeksang Arts Awards for The Red Sleeve (2022). He has also won three Grand Prizes (Daesang) at the Asia Artist Awards (2022, 2023 and 2025) and one at the APAN Star Awards (2023). His state honours include the Prime Minister's Commendation (2024) and the Minister of Culture, Sports and Tourism Award (2026).
