= Love Is Back (Chinese TV series) =

- Genre: An Idol Play - City Love
- Written by: Garphine Liu
- Directed by: Jiang Jia-jun, Director, Hong Kong

Love Is Back (Chinese: 爱情回来了) was first aired in 2014 in Mainland China. It was produced by syndicated film and television company, together with its sister films, My Daughter and Waking Love Up. It was broadcast on Anhui Television, Heilongjiang Satellite TV, Shaanxi Satellite TV, and GRT Satellite Channel on July 21, 2014.

== Broadcast time ==
=== First broadcast ===
Channel	Location	Broadcast Date	Broadcast Time	Explanation
Anhui Television/Heilongjiang Satellite Television; Shaanxi Satellite TV/GRT Satellite Channel	Mainland China	21 July 2014	Broadcast daily at 19:31	Three episodes from Monday to Friday, two on Saturday and Sunday.

== Story content ==
The series tells the story of men and women in the new era, afraid of marriage, particularly late marriage, and late childbearing.

== List of actors ==
=== The leading actors ===
- Stephy Qi (played the role of Mingliang)- 30 years old, Creative Director of G&K Advertising Characters: Giant Woman, Queen of Blast, Action, Stormwind, Code name "Giant Woman". She believes that women's happiness depends on themselves, and that marriage only reduces women's points, and their attitude toward their lovers is a way to win, and that is, to wield it, a "fighter" among women.
- Michael Chen (played the role of Gaojian)- 32 years old, Director of Operations at G&K Advertising

Character label: dim sum man, playboy, commitment phobia, bad man stands for the code name dim sum man.

Personality: tyrannical, self-righteous, can speak in a good way as a habit to hide their true feelings. He believed that if love was a snack and marriage was a meal, he would rather be a snack man than a snack man. Suffering from "commitment phobia", he firmly believes that a man, as long as a commitment is over, will lose his freedom for the rest of his life, imprisoned in marriage. Ruffians under the appearance of a gentle and considerate heart, will use their own way to care for the people around.

- Qiao Renliang (played the role of Cheng Lei)- 31 years old, singer-songwriter.

Character tags: appetizer man, hot-blooded man, loser man, idealist, artist character.

The code name is "Appetizer Man". Born idealistic, upright and kind, not good at utilitarianism and calculation, willing to help others. With a dream of music in his arms, he fell to death in front of reality, and in the worst case, he couldn't pay the rent. Although he is loyal to his feelings, he is eager and afraid of getting married, and worried that he can't promise his lover's happy future. Because the conditions were too poor, Cheng Lei was used by his girlfriend as an appetizer before marriage. He thought it would be good to fall in love with him. He could never marry, and was even used as a "spare tire".

- Jiang Yan (played the role of Yu Xiaonuo)- 30 years old, senior editor of Hongyue Media Group

Role tags: tug-of-war girl, little shrewd, practical, pragmatic thinker

The code name is "tug-of-war girl" (as the name implies, she often hesitates about choosing bread or love). She is described as cautious, reliable, thoughtful, and respect pragmatism. She has a partner in love but doesn't want to get married, because she doesn not want to give up looking for an ideal man with better conditions. In her career, she hopes to get rid of boring and meaningless work, striving to improve herself and seek breakthroughs. She has a clear plan for her future life, but reality often does not follow that track.

- Mao Xiaotong (played the role of Bao Niannian)- 30 years old, the pearl girl who keeps changing jobs

Character tags: pearl girl, silly sister, delicate girl, feeling pie, princess disease

The code name is "Pearl Girl". Bao Niannian is a girl who doesn't grow up. The family environment creates her innate temperament. Although she is over 30 years old, she still prefers curly hair and "sweet" dresses. In terms of personality, she can't get rid of the characteristics of innocence and waywardness. She is often called a "brainless princess". In the face of love, she adheres to the attitude of "not falling in love will die" and enjoys the feeling of being held in the palm of her hand, but she is afraid of getting married and hopes to be a little princess forever.

- Eric Wang (played the role of Fang Siqi)-

Character tags: science man, digital maniac, IT man, cold knowledge expert, wooden man.

The code name is "standard male". Confident and arrogant intellectuals believe that everyone should get married, and marriage is a symbol of human civilization. Fang Siqi's academic background in science has created his single-celled thinking. He is calm and rational. He only uses digital quantitative analysis and does not believe in feelings. He also thought that it was too troublesome to fall in love, and marriage was the standard equipment for men, so he was designated as a "standard man".

== Ratings ==
Based on csm data, ratings include full-time ratings and market share parameters.

Platform	Average Rating	Average Share Of Viewership
Anhui Television	0.534	1.543
Heilongjiang Satellite TV	0.517	1.493
GRT Satellite Channel	0.378	1.094
Shaanxi Satellite TV	0.141	0.407
