= So Good (Junho EP) =

- Regular edition cover

EP by Lee Jun-ho
- Released: July 15, 2015
- Genre: J-pop; R&B
- Length: 30:17
- Language: Japanese
- Label: Epic Records Japan
- Producer: Lee Jun-ho, Hong Ji-sang

Lee Jun-ho chronology
Feel (2014)	So Good (2015)	One (2015)

Singles from So Good
- 1. "So Good" Released: July 15, 2015

So Good is the third Japanese extended play by South Korean singer Lee Jun-ho. It was released on July 15, 2015.

== Background ==
Lee revealed that the creative process for this release was different from his first two EPs. Previously, he used to search for a melody after building chords. For this EP, Lee created a melody from nothing and also participated in the arrangement. Lee also moved away from the upbeat tone of his first two releases and focused on creating more thoughtful music depicting his inner life.

== Track listing ==
All tracks are written by Lee Jun-ho.

Track listing
No.	Title	Lyrics	Music	Arranger(s)	Length
1.	"So Good"	Lee Junho, Yu-ki Kokubo	Lee, Hong Jisang	Hong	3:29
2.	"Fire"	Lee, Hajime Watanabe, Hong	Lee, Hong	Hong	3:47
3.	"Pressure"	Lee, Kenn Kato, Hong	Lee, Hong	Hong	3:54
4.	"Insane"	Lee, Watanabe, Hong	Lee, Hong	Hong	3:46
5.	"The Last Night"	Lee, Kokubo, Kohei Yokono, Hong	Lee, Hong	Hong	4:03
6.	"Don't Tease Me"	Lee, Yu Shimoji, Hong	Lee, Hong	Hong	3:07
7.	"Good Life"	Lee, Yuhki Shirai, Hong	Lee, Hong	Hong	3:39
8.	"Believe"	Lee, Risa Horie, Hong	Lee, Hong	Hong	4:30
Total length:					30:17

== Commercial performance ==
The album ranked first on Oricon's daily albums chart on the day of release. It sold over 40,000 copies in the first week of release and topped Tower Records' weekly albums chart and placed third on Oricon's weekly albums chart. It was the 88th best-selling album of 2015 in Japan according to Oricon.

== Charts ==
Chart (2013)	Peak position
Oricon Weekly Albums Chart	3
Oricon Yearly Albums Chart	88
