= Kimi no Koe (EP) =

- Regular edition cover

EP by Lee Jun-ho
- Released: July 24, 2013
- Genre: J-pop
- Length: 21:37
- Language: Japanese
- Label: Ariola Japan

Lee Jun-ho chronology
Kimi no Koe (2013)	Feel (2014)

Singles from Kimi no Koe
- 1. "Kimi no Koe" Released: July 24, 2013

Kimi no Koe (Japanese: キミの声; "Your Voice") is the first Japanese extended play by South Korean singer Lee Jun-ho. It was released on July 24, 2013.

== Background ==
On May 28, 2013, it was revealed that Lee would become the first 2PM member to make a solo Japanese debut.

== Track listing ==
All tracks are written by Lee Jun-ho.

Track listing
No.	Title	Lyrics	Music	Arranger(s)	Length
1.	"Kimi no Koe"	Lee Junho, Hong Jisang, Yu Shimoji	Lee, Hong	Hong	3:30
2.	"Like a Star"	Lee, Emyli	Lee, Hong	Hong	4:52
3.	"Me wo Tojite"	Lee, Emyli	Lee, Hong	Hong	4:18
4.	"Good Bye"	Lee, Natsumi Watanabe	Lee, Super Changddai	Super Changddai	4:39
5.	"I Love You"	Lee, Hong, IOCHI, Emyli	Lee, Hong	Hong	4:17
Total length:					21:37

Limited Edition B
No.	Title	Lyrics	Music	Arranger(s)	Length
1.	"Heartbreaker"	Emyli	Lee, Lee Woo-min "collapsedone"	collapsedone
2.	"I'm in Love (Japanese ver.)"	Lee, Hong, Shimoji, Miichael Yano	Lee, Hong	Hong
3.	"Say Yes (2013 Tokyo Dome Live ver.)"	Lee, Shimoji	Lee, Hong, Shin Bong-won	Hong, Shin

== Charts ==
Chart (2013)	Peak position
Oricon Weekly Albums Chart	3
Oricon Yearly Albums Chart	94
