= One (Junho album) =

ONE
- Regular edition cover

Studio album by Lee Jun-ho
- Released: September 14, 2015
- Genres: K-pop; R&B
- Length: 41:58
- Language: Korean
- Label: JYP Entertainment
- Producer: Lee Jun-ho

Lee Jun-ho chronology
So Good (2015)	ONE (2015)	DSMN (2016)

Singles from ONE
- 1. "Fire" Released: September 14, 2015

One is the first Korean studio album by South Korean singer Lee Jun-ho. It was released on September 14, 2015.

== Background ==
The album consists of the Korean versions of tracks from Lee's first three Japanese EPs Kimi no Koe, Feel and So Good.

== Release and promotion ==
In order to promote the title track "Fire," Lee made his first solo appearances on South Korean music shows including M Countdown, Music Bank, Show! Music Core and Inkigayo.

== Track listing ==
All tracks are written by Lee Jun-ho.

Track Listing
No.	Title	Lyrics	Music	Producer	Length
1.	"Fire"	Lee Jun-ho	Lee	Lee	3:45
2.	"So Good"	Lee, Hong Ji-sang	Lee, Hong	Lee	3:27
3.	"Don't Tease Me"	Lee, Hong	Lee, Hong	Lee	3:05
4.	"Don't Go Home"	Lee	Lee	Lee	3:40
5.	"Closed Eyes"	Lee	Lee	Lee	4:15
6.	"Like a Star"	Lee, Hong	Lee, Hong	Hong	4:50
7.	"Crush"	Lee, Hong	Lee, Hong	Lee	3:13
8.	"Insane"	Lee, Hong	Lee, Hong	Lee	3:44
9.	"Good Life 4 Me"	Lee	Lee	Lee	3:36
10.	"Pressure"	Lee, Hong	Lee, Hong	Lee, Hong	3:53
11.	"Believe"	Lee	Lee	Lee	4:32
Total length:					41:58

== Charts ==
Chart (2015)	Peak position
Japanese Oricon Weekly Albums Chart	22
South Korean Gaon Weekly Albums Chart	4
