= 2017 S/S =

- Regular edition cover

EP by Lee Junho
- Released: July 26, 2017
- Genres: J-pop; R&B
- Length: 21:31
- Language: Japanese
- Label: Epic Records Japan
- Producer: Lee Jun-ho

Lee Junho chronology
DSMN (2016)	2017 S/S (2017)	Canvas (2017)

Singles from 2017 S/S
- 1. "Ice Cream" Released: July 26, 2017

2017 S/S is the fifth Japanese extended play by South Korean singer Lee Junho. It was released on July 26, 2017.

== Background ==
On June 6, 2017, it was announced that Lee was set to release his fifth Japanese EP in July. The "S/S' in the title is an abbreviation for "Summer/Stream" and references Lee's history of releasing music and touring Japan every summer since 2013, earning him the moniker Lee Natsu (Lee Summer).

== Track listing ==
All tracks are written by Lee Jun-ho.

Track listing
No.	Title	Lyrics	Music	Arranger(s)	Length
1.	"Ice Cream"	Lee Junho, Yuka Matsumoto	Lee, Hong Jisang	Hong	3:21
2.	"Candy" (feat. Sana)	Lee, Risa Horie, Hong	Lee, Hong	Hong	3:22
3.	"Diamond"	Lee, Natsume Watanabe	Lee, Lee Woo-min "collapsedone"	"collapsedone"	3:44
4.	"Canvas"	Lee, Risa Horie, Hong	Lee, Hong	Hong	3:32
5.	"Fine"	Lee, Yu Shimoji	Lee, Hong	Hong	4:10
6.	"Ice Cream (instrumental)"		Lee, Hong	Hong	3:19
Total length:					21:31

Limited Edition B
No.	Title	Lyrics	Music	Arranger(s)	Length
1.	"Wow (Junho ver.)"	Lee, Yuki Kokubo, Hong	Lee, Hong	Hong	3:17
2.	"Ice Cream (remix)"	Lee, Hong, Matsumoto	Lee, Hong	Hong	3:21
3.	"Mata Aeruhi"	Lee, "collapsedone", Shimoji	Lee, "collapsedone"	"collapsedone"	3:48

== Charts ==
Chart (2017)	Peak position
Oricon Weekly Albums Chart	2
Oricon Yearly Albums Chart	98
