= Junho the Best =

- Standard edition cover

Compilation album by Lee Jun-ho
- Released: December 5, 2018
- Recorded: 2013–2018
- Genre: J-pop; R&B; dance-pop
- Length: 59:49
- Language: Japanese
- Label: Epic Records Japan
- Producer: Lee Jun-ho, Hong Ji-sang

Lee Jun-ho chronology
Souzou (2018)	Junho the Best (2018)	Two (2019)

Junho the Best is the first Japanese compilation album by South Korean singer Lee Jun-ho. It was released on December 5, 2018.

== Background ==
The album contains 16 tracks from Lee's seven Japanese EPs released from 2013 to 2018. It was his final Japanese release before enlisting for his mandatory military service.

== Track listing ==
Track listing
No.	Title	Lyrics	Music	Arranger(s)	Length
1.	"Kimi no Koe"	Lee Jun-ho, Hong Ji-sang, Yu Shimoji	Lee, Hong	Hong	3:30
2.	"Like a Star"	Lee, Emyli	Lee, Hong	Hong	4:52
3.	"Feel"	Lee, Shiimoji	Lee, Hong	Hong	3:36
4.	"Next to You"	Lee, Kenn Kato	Lee, Hong	Hong	3:52
5.	"So Good"	Lee, Yu-ki Kokubo	Lee, Hong	Hong	3:29
6.	"Fire"	Lee, Hajime Watanabe, Hong	Lee, Hong	Hong	3:47
7.	"DSMN"	Lee, Hong, KushitaMine	Lee, Hong	Hong	3:11
8.	"Doku (On Your Mind)"	Lee, Hong, Shoko Fujibayashi	Lee, Hong	Hong	3:39
9.	"Ice Cream"	Lee, Yuka Matsumoto	Lee, Hong	Hong	3:21
10.	"Canvas"	Lee, Risa Horie, Hong	Lee, Hong	Hong	3:32
11.	"Fine"	Lee, Shimoji	Lee, Hong	Hong	4:08
12.	"Winter Sleep"	Lee, Yhanael	Lee, Hong	Hong	3:29
13.	"Airplane"	Lee, Shoko Fujibayash	Lee, Hong	Hong	3:38
14.	"Souzou"	Lee, Natsume Watanabe	Lee, Hong	Hong	4:07
15.	"Darling"	Lee, Raphael, Shimoji	Lee, Raphael	Hong	3:08
16.	"Say Yes"	Lee, Shimoji	Lee, Hong, Shin Bong-won	Hong, Shin	4:21
Total length:					59:49

== Charts ==
Chart (2018)	Peak position
Oricon Weekly Albums Chart	6
