= Winter Sleep (EP) =

- Regular edition cover

EP by Lee Jun-ho
- Released: January 25, 2018
- Genre: J-pop; R&B
- Length: 22:12
- Language: Japanese
- Label: Epic Records Japan
- Producer: Lee Jun-ho

Lee Jun-ho chronology
Canvas (2017)	Winter Sleep (2018)	Souzou (2018)

Singles from Winter Sleep
- 1. "Winter Sleep" Released: January 25, 2018

Winter Sleep is the sixth Japanese extended play by South Korean singer Lee Jun-ho. It was released on January 25, 2018.

== Background ==
The EP marked Lee's first winter release after releasing new music and touring Japan every summer from 2013 to 2017, earning him the moniker Lee Natsu (Lee Summer). Lee revealed that the themes of the album were "hibernation" and "winter shelter" and aimed to heal the listener.

== Track listing ==
All tracks are written by Lee Junho.

Track listing
No.	Title	Lyrics	Music	Arrangements	Length
1.	"Winter Sleep"	Lee, Yhanael	Lee, Hong	Hong	3:28
2.	"Airplane"	Lee, Shoko Fujibayash	Lee, Hong	Hong	3:38
3.	"Too Late to Tell"	Lee, Yhanael	Lee, Lee Woo Min "collapsedone"	Lee, collapsedone	4:14
4.	"Frozen Heart"	Lee, Yuhki Shirai	Lee, Hong	Hong	3:46
5.	"Torso"	Lee, Yhanael	Lee, Ryan, Kyum Luk, Jade	Ryan, Kyum, Jade	3:46
6.	"Winter Sleep (Instrumental)"		Lee, Hong	Hong	3:37
Total length:					22:12

Limited Edition B
No.	Title	Lyrics	Music	Arranger(s)	Length
1.	"365 (Winter Party ver.)"	Lee, Hong, Yhanael	Lee, Hong	Hong	3:31
2.	"Issyoni Sugoshita Jikan (Junho ver.)"	Lee, Hong, Natsumi Watanabe	Lee, Hong	Hong	5:12
3.	"Winter Sleep (Snowy Night ver.)"	Lee, Hong, Yhanael	Lee, Hong	Hong	3:16

== Charts ==
Chart (2018)	Peak position
Oricon Weekly Albums Chart	3
