= DSMN =

- Regular edition cover

EP by Lee Jun-ho
- Released: July 20, 2016
- Genres: J-pop; R&B
- Length: 29:24
- Language: Japanese
- Label: Epic Records Japan
- Producers: Lee Jun-ho, Hong Ji-sang

Lee Jun-ho chronology
One (2015)	DSMN (2016)	2017 S/S (2017)

Singles from DSMN
- 1. "Insomnia" Released: July 20, 2016

DSMN is the fourth Japanese extended play by South Korean singer Lee Jun-ho. It was released on July 20, 2016.

== Background ==
In an interview, Lee revealed that the creative process behind his previous work, So Good, took a toll on his mental health. The concept for this release centred around "freedom" and "liberation." DSMN is an acronym for "Don't Stop Me Now."

== Composition ==
Lee shared that DSMN was the most challenging of his four releases at the time, largely due to his busy schedule. He wrote the track "On Your Mind" on a day off during 2PM's Galaxy of 2PM tour. The track is themed around forbidden love and has a smooth, mid-tempo groove with an '80s boogie influence. Lee also revealed that his goal with the release was to create hybrid music unbound by genre. “Run to You” blends tropical house with dancehall reggae.

== Track listing ==
All tracks are written by Lee Jun-ho.

DSMN track listing
No.	Title	Lyrics	Music	Arrangements	Length
1.	"Hyper" (featuring Jun. K)	Lee Jun-ho, Jun. K, Michael Yano, Lee Woo-min "collapsedone"	Lee, collapsedone	Lee, collapsedone	2:51
2.	"DSMN"	Lee, Hong Ji-sang, KushitaMine	Lee, Hong	Hong	3:11
3.	"Doku (On Your Mind)"	Lee, Hong, Shoko Fujibayashi	Lee, Hong	Lee, Hong	3:40
4.	"Yes"	Lee, Risa Horie	Lee, Sim Eunjee	Sim	3:38
5.	"Run to You"	Lee, Hong, Yu-ki Kokubo	Lee, Hong	Hong	3:38
6.	"Instant Love"	Lee, Hong, Yuhki Shirai	Lee, Hong	Hong	5:00
7.	"Roller Coaster"	Lee, Risa Horie	Lee, Sim	Sim	3:42
8.	"Insomnia"	Lee, collapsedone, YHANAEL	Lee, collapsedone	Lee, collapsedone	3:43
Total length:					29:24

== Charts ==
Chart (2016)	Peak position
Oricon Weekly Albums Chart	2
Oricon Yearly Albums Chart	90
