= Feel (Junho EP) =

FEEL

EP by Lee Junho
- Released: July 9, 2014
- Recorded: 2014
- Genre: J-pop, R&B, dance-pop
- Length: 29:07; 14:39 (Korean ver.)
- Language: Japanese, Korean
- Label: Epic Records Japan; JYP Entertainment
- Producer: Lee Jun-ho

Lee Junho chronology
Kimi no Koe (2013)	FEEL (2014)	So Good (2015)

Feel is the second Japanese extended play by South Korean singer Lee Jun-ho. It was released on July 9, 2014.

== Track listing ==
All tracks are written by Lee Jun-ho.

Track listing
No.	Title	Lyrics	Music	Arrangements	Length
1.	"Feel"	Lee Jun-ho, Yu Shimoji	Lee, Hong Ji-sang	Hong	3:36
2.	"Dangerous"	Lee, Shoko Fujibayashi	Lee, Hong	Hong	4:01
3.	"Zutto"	Lee, Shimoji	Lee, Min Lee "collapsedone"	Min	3:36
4.	"Ikanaide ~No No No~"	Lee, Natsumi Watanabe	Lee, Sim Eunjee	Sim	3:42
5.	"Next to you"	Lee, Kenn Kato	Lee, Hong	Hong	3:52
6.	"Can't Let You Go"	Lee, Horie	Lee, Hong	Hong	3:54
7.	"Turn It Up"	Lee, Shimoji	Lee, Min	Min	3:14
8.	"You & Me"	Lee, Osanai	Lee, Hong	Hong	3:09
Total length:					29:07

Korean Ver.
No.	Title	Length
1.	"Feel"	3:34
2.	"Dangerous"	4:00
3.	"Hey You"	3:13
4.	"Can't Let You Go"	3:51
Total length:		14:39

== Charts ==
Chart (2014)	Peak position
Japanese Oricon Weekly Albums Chart	2
Japanese Oricon Yearly Albums Chart	94
South Korean Gaon Weekly Albums Chart	5
