= Souzou =

- Regular edition cover

EP by Lee Jun-ho
- Released: July 11, 2018
- Genre: J-pop; R&B
- Length: 32:26
- Language: Japanese
- Label: Epic Records Japan
- Producer: Lee Jun-ho

Lee Jun-ho chronology
Winter Sleep (2018)	Souzou (2018)	Junho the Best (2018)

Singles from Souzou
- 1. "Souzou" Released: June 26, 2018

Souzou (Japanese: 想像; "Imagination") is the seventh Japanese extended play by South Korean singer Lee Jun-ho. It was released on July 11, 2018.

== Track listing ==
Souzou track listing
No.	Title	Lyrics	Music	Arrangements	Length
1.	"Souzou"	Lee Jun-ho, Natsumi Watanabe	Lee, Frants	Frants	4:07
2.	"Flashlight"	Lee, Yuhki Shirai	Lee, Hong Ji-sang	Hong	3:14
3.	"Ride Up"	Lee, Samuelle Soung, Yu-ki Kokubo	Lee, Hong	Hong	3:21
4.	"What You Want"	Lee, Ryan Im, Risa Horie	Lee, Im, Kyum LYK, 1Hz	Im, Kyum LYK, 1Hz	3:34
5.	"Darling"	Lee, Raphael, Yu Shimoji	Lee, Raphael	Raphael	3:08
6.	"Douse Wasureru Darou"	Lee, Eri Osanai	Lee, Hong	Im, Hong	4:04
7.	"All Day"	Lee, Simon	Lee, Boytoy	Boytoy	3:29
8.	"Jikan wo Koete"	Lee, Lauren Kaori	Lee, Toyo	Toyo	3:21
9.	"Souzou" (Instrumental)	–	Lee, Frants	Frants	4:05
Total length:					32:26

== Charts ==
Chart (2018)	Peak position
Oricon Weekly Albums Chart	1
Oricon Yearly Albums Chart	87

== Commercial performance ==
Souzou topped both Oricon's and Tower Records' daily albums chart, boasting estimated first-day sales of 27,270 units. It also topped Tower Records' weekly charts and became Lee's first release to top Oricon's weekly charts.
