= 2PM discography =

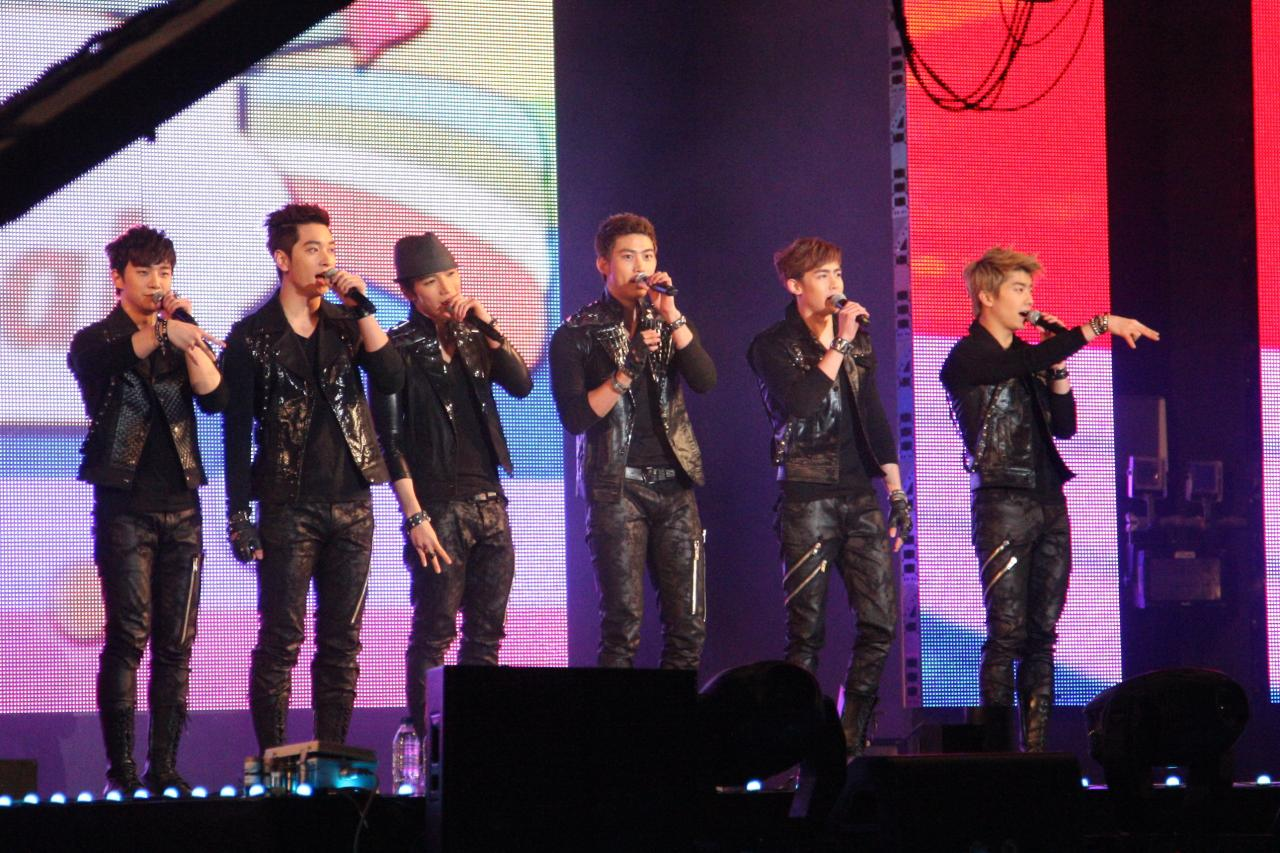
- 2PM in 2011; Left to right: Junho, Chansung, Jun. K, Taecyeon, Nichkhun, Wooyoung
- Studio albums: 12
- Extended plays: 2
- Compilation albums: 9
- Singles: 27
- Promotional singles: 11
- Single albums: 3

South Korean boy band 2PM has released twelve studio albums, nine compilation albums, two EPs, three single albums, and twenty-seven singles (excluding eleven promotional singles and three collaboration singles). Nine of their Japanese singles and their studio album Galaxy of 2PM (2016) have been certified Gold by the Recording Industry Association of Japan (RIAJ).

2PM made their debut with "10 Out of 10" from their first single album titled Hottest Time of the Day, first released on August 29, 2008. However, it was their 2009 song "Again & Again" from their second single album, 2:00PM Time For Change, that propelled them to mainstream success in Korean music, solidifying their meteoric rise. Both singles were compiled for a physical release in Thailand, which topped various Thai music charts. After the controversial departure of former leader Jaebeom, the group made a comeback as a six-member group in November 2009 with the lead single "Heartbeat" from their first full-length album 01:59PM. The album ended up topping the very first issue of the Gaon Album Chart. The success of both "Again & Again" and "Heartbeat" earned them the Artist of the Year award at the 2009 Mnet Asian Music Awards.

The following year, 2PM released another single album, Don't Stop Can't Stop, and their first extended play, Still 2:00PM, both of which topped the Gaon Album Chart. "Without U" from the former was the group's first song to top the Gaon Digital Chart. On November 1, 2010, the latter EP debuted unexpectedly at number 13 on the Billboard World Albums Chart, though no specific promotion for the album occurred in the United States.

In 2011, 2PM debuted in Japan with the single "Take Off", which peaked at number four on the Oricon Singles Chart. Soon after, they released their second Korean album, Hands Up, which topped the Gaon Chart and spawned the hit title track of the same name. Both of the group's follow-up Japanese singles, "I'm Your Man" and "Ultra Lover", peaked at number four, while the latter became their first release to be certified Gold by the RIAJ. All three singles were included in their first Japanese album, Republic of 2PM (2011).

In 2012, 2PM rerecorded several of their old Korean-language tracks for a compilation album titled 2PM Member's Selection. That same year, they released three more singles in Japan: "Beautiful"; "One Day", a collaboration with 2AM; and "Masquerade". "Beautiful" and "Masquerade" peaked at number two and were included in the group's second Japanese album, Legend of 2PM (2013), which topped the Oricon Albums Chart.

Grown (2013), their third Korean studio album, peaked at number ten on the Oricon Albums Chart, number six on the Billboard World Albums Chart, and number one in South Korea, their third consecutive number-one Korean studio album. That same year, 2PM released two more singles in Japan: "Give Me Love" and "Winter Games". The latter was the group's first single to top the Oricon Singles Chart. Both singles were included in their third Japanese album Genesis of 2PM (2014). 2PM's fourth Korean album, Go Crazy!, was their first album not to reach the top spot in the country, peaking at number three. The Japanese version of the album's title track, "Midaretemina", reached number two on the Oricon Singles Chart.

2PM reached the top spot on the Oricon Singles Chart for the second time in 2015 with "Guilty Love", which along with "Midaretemina", was included in their fourth Japanese album, 2PM of 2PM. The group's fifth Korean album, No.5 (2015), topped the Gaon Album Chart and peaked at number three on the Billboard World Albums Chart—their highest rank to date. They released another Japanese single, "Higher", which was followed by their fifth Japanese album, Galaxy of 2PM (2016), their fourth consecutive number-one studio album in Japan and their first to receive Gold certification status from the RIAJ. 2PM topped the Gaon Album Chart again with their sixth Korean studio album Gentlemen's Game. The Japanese version of the title track, "Promise (I'll Be)", peaked at number two on the Oricon Singles Chart.

2PM went on hiatus from 2017 to 2021 due to mandatory military service, during which their label released three compilation albums of their songs in Japan. Furthermore, "My House", the title track of No.5, suddenly went viral in 2020. The group made their comeback in 2021 with their seventh Korean studio album, Must, which peaked at number three on the Gaon Album Chart, and their first Japanese EP, With Me Again, which peaked at number two on the Oricon Albums Chart.

== Albums ==
=== Studio albums ===
List of studio albums, with selected chart positions, sales figures and certifications
Title	Album details	Peak chart positions				Sales	Certifications (Note: Albums' certification dates: Galaxy of 2PM: May 2016)
Title	Album details	KOR	JPN	JPN Hot (Note: Billboard Japan Hot Albums Chart was launched on June 4, 2015.)	US World	Sales	Certifications
Korean
01:59PM	Released: November 10, 2009 (KOR); Label: JYP Entertainment, Ariola Japan; Formats: CD, digital download	1	16	—	—	KOR: 57,906; JPN: 13,369	
Hands Up	Released: June 20, 2011 (KOR); Label: JYP Entertainment, Ariola Japan; Formats: CD, digital download	1	17	—	—	KOR: 117,005; JPN: 26,482	
Grown	Released: May 6, 2013 (KOR); Label: JYP Entertainment, KT Music; Formats: CD, digital download	1	10	—	6	KOR: 140,982; JPN: 24,937	
Go Crazy!	Released: September 15, 2014 (KOR); Label: JYP Entertainment, KT Music; Formats: CD, digital download	3	18	—	7	KOR: 72,815; JPN: 11,358	
No.5	Released: June 15, 2015 (KOR); Label: JYP Entertainment, KT Music; Formats: CD, digital download	1	14	—	3	KOR: 63,392; JPN: 11,777	
Gentlemen's Game	Released: September 13, 2016 (KOR); Label: JYP Entertainment, KT Music; Formats: CD, digital download	1	12	—	11	KOR: 69,678; JPN: 12,287	
Must	Released: June 28, 2021 (KOR); Label: JYP Entertainment; Formats: CD, digital download	3	4	8	—	KOR: 143,480; JPN: 8,187	
Japanese
Republic of 2PM	Released: November 30, 2011 (JPN); Label: Ariola Japan; Formats: CD, digital download	—	4	—	—	JPN: 73,510	
Legend of 2PM	Released: February 13, 2013 (JPN); Label: Ariola Japan; Formats: CD, digital download	—	1	—	—	JPN: 64,291	
Genesis of 2PM	Released: January 29, 2014 (JPN); Label: Epic Records Japan; Formats: CD, digital download	—	1	—	—	JPN: 72,003	
2PM of 2PM	Released: April 15, 2015 (JPN); Label: Epic Records Japan; Formats: CD, digital download	—	1	35	—	JPN: 68,147	
Galaxy of 2PM	Released: April 27, 2016 (JPN); Label: Epic Records Japan; Formats: CD, digital download	—	1	1	—	JPN: 122,685	RIAJ: Gold
"—" denotes items which were not released in that country or failed to chart.

=== Compilation albums ===
List of compilation albums, with selected chart positions and sales figures
Title	Album details	Peak chart positions			Sales
Title	Album details	KOR	JPN	JPN Hot	Sales
2PM Thailand Special Edition (Note: Compilation of Hottest Time of the Day and 2:00PM Time for Change)	Released: June 25, 2009 (THA); Label: Sony Music Thailand; Formats: CD + DVD	—	—	—	THA: 8,000
2PM Taiwan Special Edition (Note: Compilation of Hottest Time of the Day, 2:00PM Time for Change, and "Only You" (Winter Special))	Released: May 10, 2010 (TWN); Label: Universal Music Taiwan; Formats: CD + DVD	—	—	—	
2PM 2nd Special Edition (Note: Compilation of Don't Stop Can't Stop and first eight tracks of 01:59PM)	Released: August 31, 2010 (TWN); Label: Universal Music Taiwan; Formats: CD + DVD	—	—	—	
All About 2PM (Note: Compilation of Hottest Time of the Day, 2:00PM Time For Change, 01:59PM, Don't Stop Can't Stop, and Still 2:00PM)	Released: March 9, 2011 (JPN); Label: Ariola Japan; Formats: CD, digital download	—	26	—	JPN: 4,502
2PM Best ~2008–2011 in Korea~	Released: March 14, 2012 (JPN); Label: Ariola Japan; Formats: CD, digital download	—	5	—	JPN: 40,272
2PM Member's Selection	Released: May 22, 2012 (KOR); Label: JYP Entertainment; Formats: CD, digital download	1	—	—	KOR: 21,183; JPN: 3,364
2PM Awards Selection (Note: Compilation album of fan-voted songs.)	Released: September 27, 2018 (JPN); Label: Epic Records Japan; Formats: Digital download; Track listing: 1. "Back 2U"; 2. "Maza"; 3. "I Can't"; 4. "I'm Your Man"; 5. "Give It To Me"; 6. "Hot"; 7. "Stay With Me"; 8. "Hanarete Itemo" (離れていても; Even If We're Apart); 9. "A.D.T.O.Y."; 10. "Zero Point"; 11. "Next Generation"; 12. "365"; 13. "Magic"; 14. "Souzoushitemite" (想像してみて; Try Your Imagination); 15. "Milky Way ~Galaxy~" (天の川 ～Galaxy～); 16. "Humming"	—	— (Note: 2PM Awards Selection did not chart on the Oricon Albums Chart as a digital-only release, but peaked at number 26 on the composite Oricon Digital Albums Chart.)	86	
2PM Best in Korea 2 ～2012–2017～	Released: September 18, 2019 (JPN); Label: Epic Records Japan; Formats: CD, digital download; Track listing: 1. "A.D.T.O.Y."; 2. "Comeback When You Hear This Song"; 3. "Zero Point"; 4. "Game Over"; 5. "Love Song"; 6. "At Times"; 7. "Go Crazy!"; 8. "Mine"; 9. "Rain"; 10. "My House"; 11. "Nobody Else"; 12. "Promise (I'll Be)"; 13. "Giv U Class."; 14. "Make Love"; 15. "Humming"	—	7	8	JPN: 8,713
The Best of 2PM in Japan 2011–2016	Released: March 13, 2020 (JPN); Label: Epic Records Japan; Formats: CD, digital download; Disc One track listing: 1. "I'm Your Man"; 2. "Breakthrough"; 3. "Take Off"; 4. "Ultra Lover"; 5. "Unmei" (運命; Fate); 6. "Stay Here"; 7. "Kimi Ga Ireba" (君がいれば; If You Are Here); 8. "Masquerade" (マスカレード ～Masquerade～); 9. "Beautiful"; 10. "So Bad"; 11. "This Is Love"; 12. "Stay with me" 13. "I'll Be OK"; 14. "Beautiful Day"; 15. "Forever"; 16. "Next Generation"; 17. "Give Me Love"; 18. "Merry-Go-Round"; 19. "Hanarete Itemo" (離れていても; Even If We're Apart); Disc Two track listing: 1. "Souzoushitemite" (想像してみて; Try Your Imagination"; 2. "Midaretemina" (ミダレテミナ; Go Crazy!); 3. "Wow"; 4. "Everybody"; 5. "Fight"; 6. "Winter Games"; 7. "Step by Step"; 8. "Falling In Love"; 9. "365"; 10. "Shining Star"; 11. "Guilty Love"; 12. "Jam Session"; 13. "Higher"; 14. "My House" (Japanese ver.); 15. "Spring Breeze ~Good-Bye Again~"; 16. "Teaser"; 17. "The Time We Spent Together" (一緒に過ごした時間); 18. "Milky Way ~Galaxy~" (天の川 ~Galaxy~); 19. "Promise (I'll Be)" (Japanese ver.)	—	7	8	JPN: 7,734
"—" denotes items which were not released in that country or failed to chart.

=== Single albums ===
Title	Album details	Peak chart positions	Sales
Title	Album details	KOR (Note: Gaon Chart was launched on February 23, 2010.)	Sales
Hottest Time Of The Day	Released: August 29, 2008 (KOR); Label: JYP Entertainment; Formats: CD, digital download	10	KOR: 1,603
2:00PM Time For Change	Released: April 16, 2009 (KOR); Label: JYP Entertainment; Formats: CD, digital download	—	
Don't Stop Can't Stop	Released: April 19, 2010 (KOR); Label: JYP Entertainment; Formats: CD, digital download	1	KOR: 62,575
"—" denotes items which were not released in that country or failed to chart.

== Extended plays ==
List of extended plays, with selected chart positions and sales figures
Title	Details	Peak chart positions				Sales
Title	Details	KOR	JPN	JPN Hot	US World	Sales
Still 02:00PM	Released: October 11, 2010 (KOR); Label: JYP Entertainment, Jakorea; Formats: CD, digital download	1	—	—	13	KOR: 90,442; JPN: 6,994
With Me Again	Released: September 29, 2021 (JPN); Label: Epic Records Japan; Formats: CD, digital download	—	2	2	—	JPN: 48,075
"—" denotes items which were not released in that country or failed to chart.

== Singles ==
=== As lead artist ===
List of singles as lead artist, with selected chart positions, sales figures and certifications, showing year released and album name
Title	Year	Peak chart positions					Sales (Note: Korean single section is a digital sales only by Gaon Music Chart and Japanese single section is a CD single sales by Oricon)	Certifications (Note: Singles' certification dates: "Ultra Lover": December 2011; "Beautiful": June 2012; "Masquerade": November 2012; "Give Me Love": May 2013; "Winter Games": October 2013; "Midaretemina": September 2014; "Guilty Love": January 2015; "Higher": October 2015; "Promise (I'll Be)" (Japanese version): November 2016)	Album
Title	Year	KOR	KOR Hot (Note: K-Pop Hot 100 was launched on September 3, 2011 and discontinued on July 16, 2014.)	JPN	JPN Hot	US World	Sales	Certifications	Album
Korean
"10 Out of 10" (10점 만점에 10점)	2008	—	—	—	—	—			Hottest Time of the Day and 01:59PM
"Only You" (Winter Special)	2008	—	—	—	—	—			Non-album single
"Again & Again"	2009	—	—	—	—	—			2:00PM Time For Change and 01:59PM
"Heartbeat"	2009	14	—	—	—	—	KOR: 1,076,869		01:59PM
"Without U"	2010	1	—	—	—	—	KOR: 1,833,617		Don't Stop Can't Stop and Hands Up
"Thank You"	2010	18	—	—	—	—			Hands Up
"I'll Be Back"	2010	4	—	—	—	8	KOR: 1,412,066		Still 02:00PM and Hands Up
"Hands Up"	2011	1	26	—	—	3	KOR: 2,837,018		Hands Up
"Comeback When You Hear This Song" (이 노래를 듣고 돌아와)	2013	7	16	—	—	5	KOR: 512,972		Grown
"A.D.T.O.Y." (하.니.뿐.)	2013	16	21	—	—	5	KOR: 398,084		Grown
"Go Crazy!" (미친거 아니야?)	2014	5	—	—	—	5	KOR: 280,338		Go Crazy!
"My House" (우리집)	2015	7	—	—	—	7	KOR: 298,275		No.5
"Promise (I'll Be)"	2016	61	—	—	—	11	KOR: 31,568		Gentlemen's Game
"Make It" (해야 해)	2021	39	81	—	—	20			Must
Japanese
"Take Off" (Note: Japanese debut single)	2011	—	—	4	3	—	JPN: 73,210		Republic of 2PM
"I'm Your Man"	2011	69 (Note: Korean version from Go Crazy!)	—	4	3	—	JPN: 84,298; KOR: 166,972		Republic of 2PM
"Ultra Lover"	2011	—	—	4	6	—	JPN: 100,000	RIAJ: Gold	Republic of 2PM
"Beautiful"	2012	118	—	2	2	—	JPN: 163,463; KOR: 36,330	RIAJ: Gold	Legend of 2PM
"One Day" (with 2AM)	2012	—	—	5	5	—	JPN: 66,224		Non-album single
"Masquerade" (マスカレード ～Masquerade～)	2012	—	—	2	2	—	JPN: 151,227	RIAJ: Gold	Legend of 2PM
"Give Me Love"	2013	—	—	2	3	—	JPN: 151,841	RIAJ: Gold	Genesis of 2PM
"Winter Games"	2013	—	—	1	1	—	JPN: 125,227	RIAJ: Gold	Genesis of 2PM
"Midaretemina" (ミダレテミナ)	2014	—	—	2	1	—	JPN: 110,009 (phy.)	RIAJ: Gold	2PM of 2PM
"Guilty Love"	2015	—	—	1	1	—	JPN: 109,377	RIAJ: Gold	2PM of 2PM
"Higher"	2015	—	—	2	2	—	JPN: 137,238	RIAJ: Gold	Galaxy of 2PM
"Promise (I'll Be)" (Japanese ver.)	2016	—	—	2	4	—	JPN: 101,106 (phy.)	RIAJ: Gold	Non-album single
"With Me Again" (僕とまた)	2021	—	—	— (Note: "With Me Again" did not enter the Oricon Singles Chart due to its release as part of an EP, but did peak at number 44 on the composite Oricon Digital Singles Chart.)	— (Note: "With Me Again" did not enter the Oricon Singles Chart due to its release as part of an EP, but did peak at number 43 on the composite Billboard Japan Download Songs Chart.)	—			With Me Again
"—" denotes items which were not released in that country or failed to chart.

=== As featured artist ===
List of singles as featured artist, showing year released and album name
Title	Year	Peak chart positions	Album
Title	Year	KOR	Album
"This Christmas" (with JYP Nation artists)	2010	34	Non-album singles
"You Are A Miracle" (with SBS Gayo Daejeon Friendship Project) (Note: Jun. K, Nichkhun, Wooyoung, and Chansung only)	2013	32	Non-album singles
"Encore" (with JYP Nation artists) (Note: Nichkhun and Junho only)	2016	—	Non-album singles

=== Promotional singles ===
List of promotional singles, with selected chart positions and sales figures, showing year released and album name
Title	Year	Peak chart positions	Album
Title	Year	KOR	Album
"My Color"	2009	94	Non-album singles
"Crazy4S"	2010	—	Non-album singles
"Tik Tok" (feat. Yoon Eun-hye)	2010	21	Non-album singles
"Open Happiness" (오픈 해피니스)	2010	19	Non-album singles
"Follow Your Soul"	2010	—	Non-album singles
"Cabi Song" (with Girls' Generation) (Note: Jun. K, Nichkhun, Taecyeon, and Chansung only)	2010	35	Non-album singles
"What's Your Celebration?" (너만의 짜릿한 세레모니를 보여줘!)	2010	127	Non-album singles
"Fly to Seoul (Boom Boom Boom)" (Note: Jun. K, Taecyeon, Wooyoung, Junho and Chansung only)	2010	67	Non-album singles
"Nori For U" (노리 포 유)	2010	42	Non-album singles
"Share the Beat" (셰어 더 비트)	2012	137	Non-album singles
"Win the Day" (모두 애쓰리) (with Team SIII) (Note: Nichkhun and Junho only)	2012	—	Non-album singles
"—" denotes items which were not released in that country or failed to chart.

== Other charted songs ==
List of songs, with selected chart positions, showing year released and album name
Title	Year	Peak chart positions			Album
Title	Year	KOR	KOR Hot	US World	Album
"Tired of Waiting" (기다리다 지친다)	2009	15	—	—	01:59PM
"Maza" (마자)	2010	24	—	—	Don't Stop Can't Stop
"I Will Give You My Life" (목숨을 건다)	2010	28	—	—	Don't Stop Can't Stop
"Without U" (explorer mix)	2010	74	—	—	Don't Stop Can't Stop
"I Can't"	2010	46	—	—	Still 02:00PM
"Even If You Leave Me" (니가 나를 떠나도)	2010	63	—	—	Still 02:00PM
"Still"	2010	77	—	—	Still 02:00PM
"Dance2Night"	2010	102	—	—	Still 02:00PM
"I Know"	2010	106	—	—	Still 02:00PM
"I'll Be Back" (club mix)	2010	157	—	—	Still 02:00PM
"My Valentine" (Taecyeon and Nichkhun feat. J.Y. Park)	2011	16	—	—	Dream High OST
"Dream High" (Taecyeon and Wooyoung with Suzy, Kim Soo-hyun, and Joo)	2011	41	—	—	Dream High OST
"Give It To Me"	2011	50	—	—	Hands Up
"Like A Movie" (영화처럼)	2011	57	—	—	Hands Up
"Electricity"	2011	65	—	20	Hands Up
"Hot"	2011	68	—	—	Hands Up
"Don't You Know" (모르니)	2011	71	—	—	Hands Up
"Hands Up" (East4A mix)	2011	149	—	—	Hands Up
"Electricity" (220V remix)	2011	168	—	—	Hands Up
"Only You" (2012 ver.)	2012	109	85	—	2PM Member's Selection
"Classic" (Taecyeon and Wooyoung with J.Y. Park and Suzy)	2012	58	—	—	Reebok Classic promotional single
"The First Date" (오늘부터 1일)	2013	89	—	—	Grown
"Zero Point" (원점으로)	2013	112	—	—	Grown
"I'm Sorry"	2013	128	—	—	Grown
"Dangerous"	2013	131	—	—	Grown
"Go Back" (고백)	2013	136	—	—	Grown
"One More Day" (오늘 하루만)	2013	138	—	—	Grown
"Game Over"	2013	139	—	—	Grown
"At Times" (문득)	2013	144	—	—	Grown
"Love Song"	2013	148	—	—	Grown
"Coming Down"	2013	168	—	—	Grown
"Please Call My Name" (내 이름을 불러줘)	2013	83	77	—	Grown (Grand Edition)
"Humming" (콧노래)	2016	375	—	—	Gentlemen's Game
"Shall We?" (어때?)	2016	378	—	—	Gentlemen's Game
"Uneasy"	2016	384	—	—	Gentlemen's Game
"Perfume" (향수)	2016	389	—	—	Gentlemen's Game
"Make Love"	2016	392	—	—	Gentlemen's Game
"Never"	2016	394	—	—	Gentlemen's Game
"All Night Long" (시도때도없이)	2016	398	—	—	Gentlemen's Game
"—" denotes items which were not released in that country or failed to chart.

== See also ==
- List of songs recorded by 2PM
- 2PM videography
- Jun. K discography
- Lee Jun-ho discography
