= 2PM videography =

2PM video discography
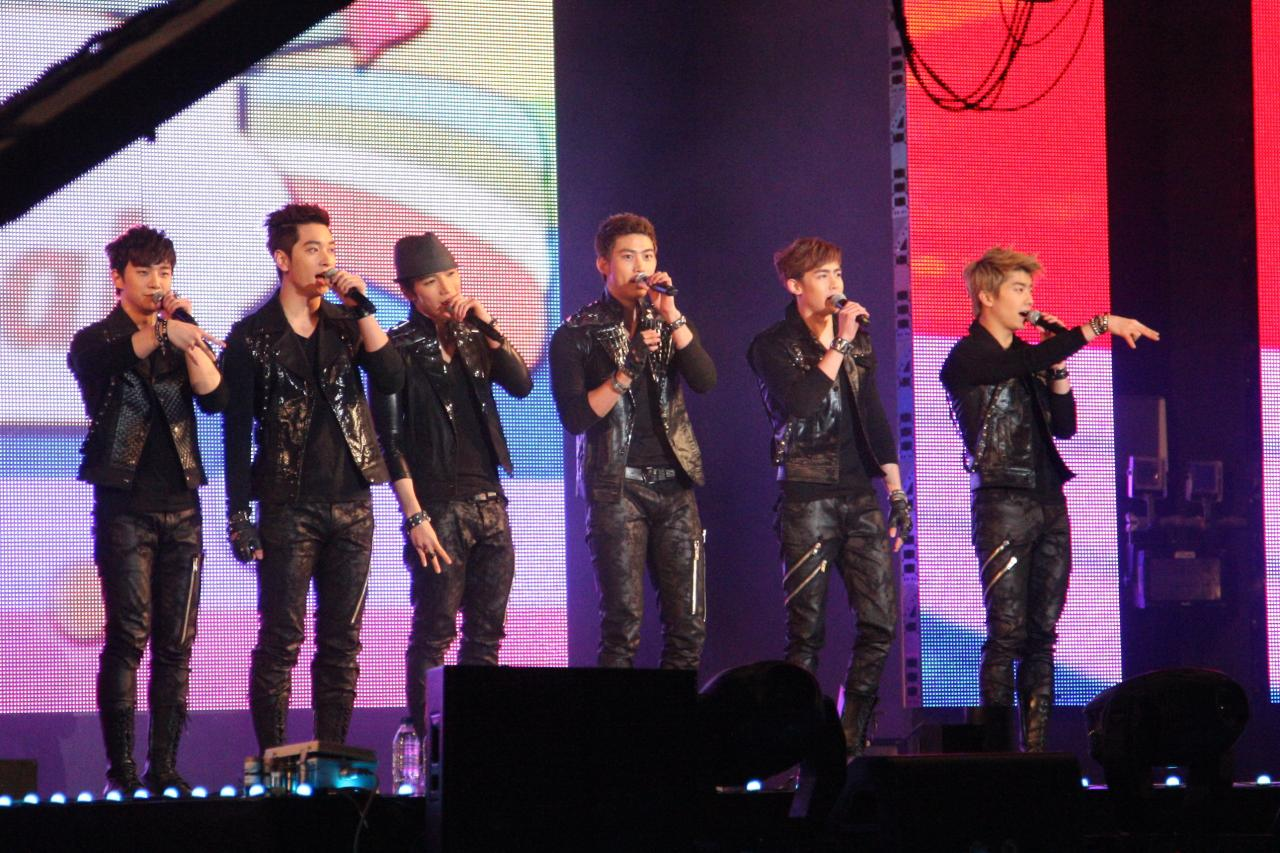
- 2PM in 2011; Left to right: Junho, Chansung, Jun. K, Taecyeon, Nichkhun, Wooyoung
- Music videos: 42
- Commercial film music videos: 9
- Dance videos: 10
- Music video compilations: 1
- Concert tour videos: 18

South Korean boy band 2PM has released forty-two music videos, nine commercial film music videos for promotional singles, eighteen concert tour videos, and one music video compilation. They debuted in 2008 with the release of their first single, "10 Out of 10", and its accompanying music video. Since then, they have released music videos for numerous songs, including two different music video versions for "Go Crazy!" and ten alternate dance videos. In 2012, the group won the Best Group Video Award at the 2012 MTV Video Music Awards Japan for "I'm Your Man". In 2014, the group won the MAMA Award for Best Music Video with "Go Crazy!"

On November 24, 2010, 2PM released a compilation of their Korean music videos titled Hottest: 2PM 1st Music Video Collection & The History in Japan prior to their debut there in 2011 with their single, "Take Off", and its accompanying music video. They have released at least one concert tour video in Japan each year from 2011 to 2020. In 2013, their DVD titled Legend of 2PM in Tokyo Dome was their first to top the Oricon DVD Chart. They have also released four concert tour videos in South Korea.

2PM has starred in a number of reality and variety shows, starting with the survival show Hot Blooded Men in 2008 that led to the formation of their group. In 2012, a documentary focusing on their group and their labelmates 2AM titled Beyond the One Day ~Story of 2PM & 2AM~ was released in Japan.

== Music videos ==
Title	Year	Album	Notes
"10 Out of 10" (10점 만점에 10점)	2008	Hottest Time of the Day	
"10 Out of 10" (Old-School ver.)	2008	Hottest Time of the Day	Also called "For fans" version
"Again & Again"	2009	2:00PM Time For Change	Original and Dance version
"I Hate You" (니가 밉다)	2009	2:00PM Time For Change	
"Heartbeat"	2009	01:59PM	
"Tired of Waiting" (기다리다 지친다)	2009	01:59PM	
"Without U"	2010	Don't Stop Can't Stop	
"I Will Give You My Life" (목숨을 건다)	2010	Don't Stop Can't Stop	
"Thank You"	2010	Hands Up	
"I'll Be Back"	2010	Still 02:00PM	Original and Dance version
"Take Off"	2011	Republic of 2PM	Original and Dance version
"Hands Up"	2011	Hands Up	
"Hands Up" (East4A mix)	2011	Hands Up	
"Give It to Me"	2011	Hands Up	
"Hot"	2011	Hands Up	
"I'm Your Man"	2011	Republic of 2PM	Original and Dance version; won the Best Group Video Award at the 2012 MTV Video Music Awards Japan
"Ultra Lover"	2011	Republic of 2PM	
"Hands Up" (Japanese version)	2011	Republic of 2PM	
"Only You"	2012	2PM Member's Selection	Originally from single album Hottest Time of the Day
"Beautiful"	2012	Legend of 2PM	Original and Dance version
"One Day" (with 2AM, as One Day)	2012	None	Original and Movie version
"Masquerade" (マスカレード ～Masquerade～)	2012	Legend of 2PM	Original, Dance version, and Off-shot movie version
"Comeback When You Hear This Song" (이 노래를 듣고 돌아와)	2013	Grown	
"A.D.T.O.Y." (하.니.뿐.)	2013	Grown	
"Give Me Love"	2013	Genesis of 2PM	Original, Dance version, and Off-shot movie version
"Winter Games"	2013	Genesis of 2PM	Original and Dance version
"Step by Step"	2013	Genesis of 2PM	
"Go Crazy!" (미친거 아니야?)	2014	Go Crazy!	Original and Party version; won the 2014 MAMA Award for Best Music Video
"Midaretemina" (ミダレテミナ)	2014	2PM of 2PM	Original and Party version
"Guilty Love"	2015	2PM of 2PM	
"365"	2015	2PM of 2PM	
"My House" (우리집)	2015	No.5	
"Higher"	2015	Galaxy of 2PM	Original, Dance version, and Close Up version
"My House" (Japanese version)	2015	Galaxy of 2PM	
"The Time We Spent Together" (一緒に過ごした時間)	2016	Galaxy of 2PM	
"Milky Way ～Galaxy～" (天の川 ～Galaxy～)	2016	Galaxy of 2PM (repackaged edition)	
"Promise (I'll Be)"	2016	Gentlemen's Game	
"Promise (I'll Be)" (Japanese version)	2016	None	
"Make It" (해야 해)	2021	Must	
"The Cafe"	2021	Must	
"Hold You"	2021	Must	
"With Me Again" (僕とまた)	2021	With Me Again	

=== Commercial film music videos ===
Title	Year	Notes
"My Color"	2009	For Samsung Anycall
"Crazy4S"	2010	For SPRIS; Original and Dance version
"Tik Tok" (featuring Yoon Eun-hye)	2010	For Casa Beer
"Open Happiness" (오픈 해피니스)	2010	For Coca-Cola; 2010 version and 2011 version
"Follow Your Soul"	2010	For Oppo Thailand
"Cabi Song" (with Girls' Generation)	2010	For Everland Resort's Caribbean Bay
"Fly to Seoul (Boom Boom Boom)"	2010	For Seoul Tourism "Infinitely Yours, Seoul"
"Nori For U" (노리 포 유)	2010	For Samsung Anycall
"Shining in the Night"	2013	For QQ Dance 2; first Chinese song

== Video albums ==
=== Music video collections ===
Title	Album details	Peak positions	Sales
Title	Album details	JPN	Sales
Hottest: 2PM 1st Music Video Collection & The History	Released: November 24, 2010; Language: Korean; Label: Ariola Japan	4	23,005

=== Concert tour videos ===
Title	Album details	Peak positions	Sales
Title	Album details	JPN	Sales
2PM 1st Concert in Seoul: Don't Stop Can't Stop	Released: April 6, 2011; Language: Korean; Label: Ariola Japan	7	7,890
2PM 1st Concert Don't Stop Can't Stop: This is For My Hottest	Released: July 25, 2011; Language: Korean; Label: CJ E&M	—	
1st Japan Tour 2011: Take Off in Makuhari Messe	Released: November 2, 2011; Language: Korean, Japanese; Label: Ariola Japan	3	12,386
Arena Tour 2011: "Republic of 2PM"	Released: June 6, 2012; Language: Korean, Japanese; Label: Ariola Japan	2	24,575
2PM Live 2012: Six Beautiful Days in Budokan	Released: December 26, 2012; Language: Korean, Japanese; Label: Ariola Japan	4	22,692
Legend of 2PM in Tokyo Dome	Released: December 9, 2013; Language: Korean, Japanese; Label: Ariola Japan	1	27,176
2PM Arena Tour 2014 "Genesis of 2PM"	Released: December 10, 2014; Language: Korean, Japanese; Label: Epic Records Japan	2	16,138
2PM X Hottest 5th Fan Meeting DVD	Released: May 8, 2015; Language: Korean; Label: JYP Entertainment	—	
2PM World Tour "Go Crazy" in Seoul DVD	Released: June 29, 2015; Language: Korean; Label: Epic Records Japan	—	
2PM Arena Tour 2015 "2PM of 2PM"	Released: December 16, 2015; Language: Japanese; Label: Epic Records Japan	5	JPN: 15,968
2015 2PM Concert "House Party" in Seoul	Released: March 22, 2016; Language: Korean; Label: JYP Entertainment	—	
2PM X Hottest 6th Fan Meeting DVD	Released: May 31, 2016; Language: Korean; Label: JYP Entertainment	—	
2PM Arena Tour 2016 "Galaxy of 2PM"	Released: February 17, 2017; Language: Japanese; Label: Epic Records Japan	2	JPN: 16,911
The 2PM in Tokyo Dome	Released: May 17, 2017; Language: Japanese; Label: Epic Records Japan	4	
2PM Concert "6Nights"	Released: January 29, 2018; Language: Korean; Label: Epic Records Japan	1	
2PM Six "Higher" Days	Released: April 4, 2019; Language: Japanese; Label: Epic Records Japan	10	
2PM Arena Tour 2016 "Galaxy of 2PM" Tour Final in Osaka-jō Hall	Released: December 23, 2020; Language: Japanese; Label: Epic Records Japan	16	
2PM Japan 15th Anniversary Concert "The Return" in Tokyo Dome	Released: January 20, 2027; Language: Japanese; Label: Epic Records Japan	TBA	
"—" denotes items which were not released in that country or failed to chart.

== Filmography ==
=== Film ===
Year	Title	Role	Notes	Ref.
2011	Annyeong	Themselves	Short interactive film for Korea Tourism Organization's Touch Korea campaign; with Miss A	
2012	Beyond the One Day ~Story of 2PM & 2AM~	Themselves	Japanese documentary; with 2AM	

=== Television series ===
Year	Network	Title	Role	Notes	Ref.
2009	SBS	Style	Themselves	Cameo (Episode 6); with 2NE1, F.T. Island, and Bada	
2011	CX (Fuji TV)	Boss (Season 2)	Themselves	Japanese drama; Cameo (Episode 6)	

=== Television specials ===
Year	Network	Title	Notes	Ref.
2011	Music On! TV	2PM's Special Week	Aired following release of Republic of 2PM	
2011	Space Shower TV	2PM Special	Aired in conjunction with Japan Arena Tour 2011: Republic of 2PM	
2013	Space Shower TV	2PM Special -Fans' Choice Live Scenes-	Aired prior to release of Legend of 2PM	
2013	Music On! TV	M-On! Monthly Icon 2PM	Aired following release of Legend of 2PM	
2013	MBC	2PM Returns	Aired in conjunction with physical release of Grown	
2014	Music On! TV	M-On! Monthly Icon 2PM	Aired prior to release of Genesis of 2PM	
2018	Music On! TV	2PM 10th Anniversary Special	Aired in conjunction with release of 2PM Awards Selection	
2021	Mnet	Must	Aired in conjunction with release of Must	

=== Variety and reality shows ===
Year	Network	Title	Notes	Ref.
2008	Mnet	Hot Blooded Men	10 episodes (January 25, 2008 – March 28, 2008). Survival show to decide members of 2PM and 2AM.	
2008–2009	MBC every1	Idol Show (Season 3)	17 episodes (December 4, 2008 – March 26, 2009). Variety show with co-host Boom and both celebrity and pedestrian guests.	
2009	Mnet	It's Time 2PM	8 episodes (June 3, 2009 – July 3, 2009). Interview series with one 2PM member per episode and one final episode of cut footage.	
2009	Mnet	Wild Bunny	7 episodes (July 21, 2009 – September 1, 2009). Variety show in which 2PM engages in activities "forbidden" to idols. Eighth episode never aired following Jaebeom's scandal and hiatus.	
2011	SBS Plus	2PM Show!	12 episodes (July 9, 2011 – September 24, 2011). Variety show in which 2PM competes to show off a different aspect of themselves each episode, with the worst ranking member being punished.	
2012–2014	NHK	One Point Korean	Two seasons (April 2, 2012 – March 17, 2014). Japanese show including segments in which 2PM teaches Korean.	
2012	Tokyo MX	Wander Trip	25 episodes (April 3, 2012 – September 25, 2012). Japanese show in which 2PM and 2AM members travel through Japan and experience Japanese culture.	
2013	KBS2	A Song For You From 2PM	15 episodes (February 17, 2013 – May 24, 2013). Web series in which 2PM members respond to fans' video messages and sing songs.	
2015	1theK Originals	Oven Radio	5 episodes (June 14, 2015 – June 18, 2015). Web series of five-minute "live radio" videos by Melon made to promote 2PM's fifth Korean studio album, No.5.	
2017	E! Asia	2PM Wild Beat in Australia	10 episodes (February 1, 2017 – April 5, 2017). Variety show in which 2PM earns money to fund their trip from Melbourne to Uluru through various challenges and searching for real part-time jobs.	
2021	Mnet	Wild Six	12 episodes. Originally a web series released on 2PM's YouTube channel that was later broadcast on Mnet.	
