= List of 2PM concert tours =

2PM concert tours
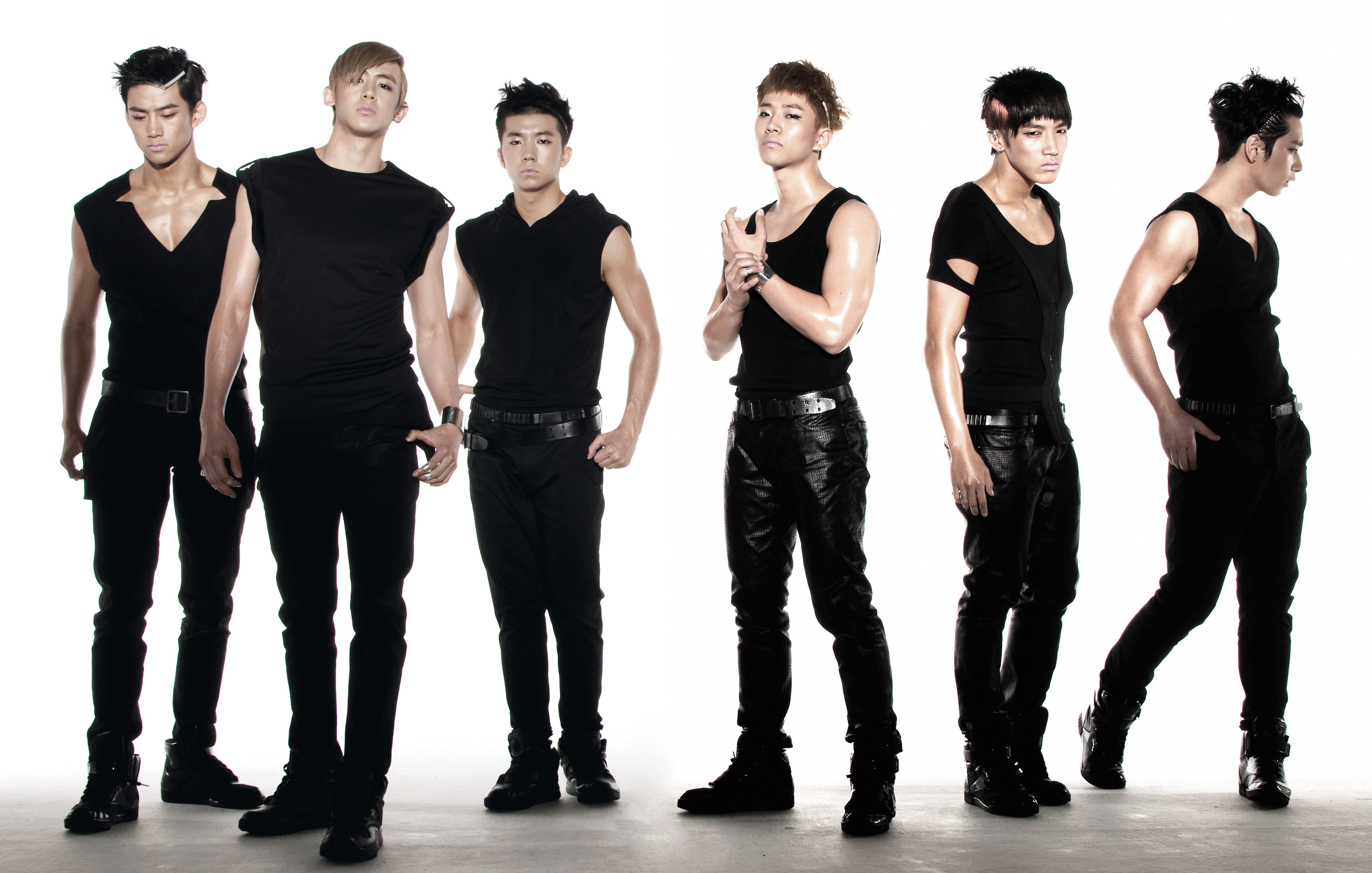
- 2PM in 2010
- Asia tours: 7
- Japan tours: 10
- World tours: 1
- Live showcases: 6
- Fan meetings: 12
- Partial group concerts: 4

South Korean boy group 2PM has performed over 100 concerts across Asia and North America. They embarked on their first tour, Don't Stop Can't Stop, in July 2010. In 2011, 2PM embarked on their first Japan tour, Take Off. In 2014, their first world tour, Go Crazy, marked the group's first solo concerts in the United States, having previously performed as opening acts for their labelmates Wonder Girls in 2010.

Their 2013 Japan tour, Legend of 2PM, marked the group's first time performing at the Tokyo Dome, one of the largest concert venues in Japan. They would return to the Tokyo Dome in 2016, marking the group's 99th and 100th solo concerts in Japan, as well as the group's final concerts in Japan prior to enlisting for mandatory military service.

Since completing their mandatory military service, 2PM has held anniversary concerts in 2023 for the fifteen anniversary since their debut and in 2026 for the fifteenth anniversary since their debut in Japan.

== Asia tours ==
=== 1st Concert: Don't Stop Can't Stop ===
Seoul, South Korea (July 31, 2010)

Main Set
Act 1 - Concert Intro

1. "What Time Is It Now?"
2. "Don't Stop Can't Stop"
3. "Tired of Waiting"
4. "Without U" (explorer mix)
5. "Only You"
6. "Angel"
7. "Boom Boom Boom" / "Open Happiness"
8. "Crazy 4S" / "My Color" & "Tik Tok"
9. "Sunday Morning" / Justin Timberlake's "SexyBack" (Taecyeon & Nichkhun)
10. "3 Bears" + Extreme's "More Than Words" (Nichkhun)
11. Justin Timberlake's "LoveStoned" / Chris Brown's "Take You Down" (Chansung)

Act 2 - Cinderella's Stepsister Parody Video

1. Orange Caramel's "Magic Girl" (Wooyoung, Chansung & Taecyeon // Junho, Jun. K & Nichkhun)
2. Trot Medley (Junho, Jun. K & Nichkhun // Wooyoung, Chansung & Taecyeon)
3. CLON's "Kungtari Shabara"

Act 3 - Changing Room Video

1. Member's Dance Bridge Songs
2. "I Hate You"
3. "I Was Crazy About You"
4. "Again & Again" (R&B mix) + Dance Flips / "You Might Comeback"
5. "10 Out of 10"
6. "Empire State of Mind" (DJ Remix) (Jun. K)
7. "Nice & Slow" / "Caught Up" (Junho)
8. Wooyoung Solo Dance (2 versions)
9. "Etude of Memory" (Taecyeon)
10. "My Life 4 U"
11. "Gimme the Light"
12. "Heartbeat"
13. "Again & Again"

Encore

1. "Thank You"
2. "I Hate You" (lounge mix)
3. "Again & Again" (remix)

Concert dates (6 shows)
Date	City	Country	Venue	Attendance
July 31, 2010	Seoul	South Korea	KSPO Dome	24,000
August 1, 2010	Seoul	South Korea	KSPO Dome	24,000
August 7, 2010	Busan	South Korea	Busan Exhibition & Convention Center	—
August 8, 2010	Busan	South Korea	Busan Exhibition & Convention Center	—
September 4, 2010	Seoul	South Korea	Jamsil Indoor Stadium	—
September 5, 2010	Seoul	South Korea	Jamsil Indoor Stadium	—

=== 2nd Concert: Hands Up Asia Tour ===
Seoul, South Korea (September 2, 2011)

Main Set
Act 1

1. "Hot"
2. "Electricity"
3. "Hands Up"
4. "I Was Crazy About You" & "Tired of Waiting (Remix)"
5. "Move On" (Junho & Wooyoung)
6. "I Can’t"
7. "Give It to Me"
8. "Dance2Night"
9. "My Valentine" (Nichkhun & Taecyeon)
10. "Revenger" (Chansung)
11. "I’ll be Back"
12. "Hyun Moo Jung"
13. "Back 2U"
14. "Alive" (Jun. K)
15. "Without U"
16. "Only You"
17. "10 Out of 10"
18. "Again & Again"
19. "I’m Your Man"
20. "Don’t Stop Can’t Stop"
21. "Heartbeat"
22. "Thank You"
23. "10 Out of 10 (Remix)"
24. "Hands Up (Remix)"

Concert dates (10 shows)
Date	City	Country	Venue	Attendance
September 2, 2011	Seoul	South Korea	Jamsil Indoor Stadium	14,000
September 3, 2011	Seoul	South Korea	Jamsil Indoor Stadium	14,000
October 7, 2011	Taipei	Taiwan	NTU Sports Center	10,000
October 8, 2011	Taipei	Taiwan	NTU Sports Center	10,000
November 11, 2011	Jakarta	Indonesia	JITEC Mangga Dua Square	7,000
November 19, 2011	Singapore		Singapore Indoor Stadium	8,000
November 25, 2011	Kuala Lumpur	Malaysia	Stadium Negara	5,000
February 18, 2012	Bangkok	Thailand	Impact Arena	9,000
February 25, 2012	Nanjing	China	Nanjing Olympic Sports Center	9,000
March 10, 2012	Hong Kong	China	AsiaWorld–Arena	9,000
Total				71,000

=== "What Time Is It?" Asia Tour ===
Concert dates (9 shows)
Date	City	Country	Venue	Attendance
November 17, 2012	Shanghai	China	Mercedes-Benz Arena	8,000
December 8, 2012	Jakarta	Indonesia	Mata Elang International Stadium	9,000
December 15, 2012	Taipei	Taiwan	Nangang Exhibition Hall	7,000
December 22, 2012	Macau	China	Cotai Arena	8,000
March 2, 2013	Manila	Philippines	Mall of Asia Arena	8,000
March 30, 2013	Guangzhou	China	Guangzhou Gymnasium	10,000
April 8, 2013	Bangkok	Thailand	Impact Arena	10,000
June 21, 2013	Seoul	South Korea	Jamsil Indoor Stadium	15,000
June 22, 2013	Seoul	South Korea	Jamsil Indoor Stadium	15,000
Total				75,000

=== 2PM Concert "House Party" ===
Concert dates (5 shows)
Date	City	Country	Venue	Attendance
June 27, 2015	Seoul	South Korea	KSPO Dome	16,000
June 28, 2015	Seoul	South Korea	KSPO Dome	16,000
August 22, 2015	Saitama	Japan	Saitama Super Arena	36,000
August 23, 2015	Saitama	Japan	Saitama Super Arena	36,000
March 20, 2016	Bangkok	Thailand	Impact Arena	—
Total				N/A

=== 2PM Concert "6Nights" ===
Concert dates (9 shows)
Date	City	Country	Venue	Attendance
February 24, 2017	Seoul	South Korea	SK Olympic Handball Gymnasium	—
February 25, 2017	Seoul	South Korea	SK Olympic Handball Gymnasium	—
February 26, 2017	Seoul	South Korea	SK Olympic Handball Gymnasium	—
~~March 3, 2017~~	Seoul	South Korea	SK Olympic Handball Gymnasium	—N/a (Note: Following Jun. K's injury sustained during the February 26 concert, the March concert dates were cancelled.)
~~March 4, 2017~~	Seoul	South Korea	SK Olympic Handball Gymnasium	—N/a
~~March 5, 2017~~	Seoul	South Korea	SK Olympic Handball Gymnasium	—N/a
June 2, 2017	Seoul	South Korea	Hwajeong Gymnasium	30,000
June 3, 2017	Seoul	South Korea	Hwajeong Gymnasium	30,000
June 4, 2017	Seoul	South Korea	Hwajeong Gymnasium	30,000
June 9, 2017	Seoul	South Korea	Hwajeong Gymnasium	30,000
June 10, 2017	Seoul	South Korea	Hwajeong Gymnasium	30,000
June 11, 2017	Seoul	South Korea	Hwajeong Gymnasium	30,000
Total				N/A

=== "It's 2PM" – 15th Anniversary Concert ===
Concert dates (4 shows)
Date	City	Country	Venue	Attendance
September 9, 2023	Seoul	South Korea	Jamsil Indoor Stadium	—
September 10, 2023	Seoul	South Korea	Jamsil Indoor Stadium	—
October 7, 2023	Tokyo	Japan	Ariake Arena	22,000
October 8, 2023	Tokyo	Japan	Ariake Arena	22,000
Total				N/A

=== 2026 2PM Concert "The Return" ===
Tokyo, Japan (May 9–10, 2011)
1. "Take Off"
2. "Set Me Free"
3. "Everybody"
4. "Next Generation"
5. Talk 1
6. "Higher"
7. "Give Me Love"
8. "Beautiful"
9. Talk 2
10. "Ultra Lover"
11. "Jam Session"
12. "Guilty Love"
13. "Souzoushitemite" (想像してみて)
14. "Midaretemina"
15. VCR 1
16. "With Me Again"
17. ""My House -Japanese ver.-"
18. "I'm Your Man"
19. "Masquerade"
20. Talk 3 – Members' Solo Songs Jukebox
21. "Unmei" (運命)
22. "Merry-Go-Round"
23. "Fight"
24. Talk 4
25. "Promise (I'll Be) -Japanese ver.-"
26. "Winter Games"
27. "Heartbeat"
28. VCR 2
29. "Hanarete Itemo" (離れていても)
30. Talk 5
31. "Falling in Love"
32. "365"
33. "Hands Up"
34. "I'll Be Back -Japanese ver.-"

Concert dates (4 shows)
Date	City	Country	Venue	Attendance
May 9, 2026	Tokyo	Japan	Tokyo Dome	85,000
May 10, 2026	Tokyo	Japan	Tokyo Dome	85,000
August 8, 2026	Incheon	South Korea	Inspire Arena	—
August 9, 2026	Incheon	South Korea	Inspire Arena	—
Total				N/A

== Japan tours ==
=== First Japan Tour: Take Off ===
Sapporo, Japan (May 6, 2011)

Main Set
Act 1

1. "What Time Is It Now?"
2. "Don't Stop, Can't Stop"
3. "I Hate You"
4. "Without U"
5. "I Can't"
6. "Only You (Acoustic and Winter Special Remix)"
7. "Tired of Waiting"
8. Utada's "First Love" (Nichkhun)
9. Usher's "Nice & Slow" (Junho)
10. Far East Movement's "Like a G6" (Wooyoung)
11. "Take Off"
12. "I'll Be Back"
13. "10 Out of 10"
14. Jay-Z & Alicia Keys' Empire State of Mind (Jun. K)
15. Rain's "Love Song" (Chansung)
16. Greeeen's "Miracle" (Taecyeon)
17. "I Will Give You My Life"
18. "Gimme the Light"
19. "Again & Again"
20. "Heartbeat"

Encore

1. "Thank You"
2. "Again & Again (Remix)"
3. "I Hate You (Lounge Mix)"

Concert dates (6 shows)
Date	City	Country	Venue	Attendance
May 6, 2011	Sapporo	Japan	Zepp Sapporo	20,000
May 8, 2011	Fukuoka	Japan	Zepp Fukuoka	20,000
May 9, 2011	Osaka	Japan	Zepp Osaka	20,000
May 10, 2011	Nagoya	Japan	Zepp Nagoya	20,000
May 12, 2011	Chiba	Japan	Makuhari Messe	20,000
May 13, 2011	Tokyo	Japan	Zepp Tokyo	20,000
Total				20,000

=== Japan Arena Tour 2011: Republic of 2PM ===
Concert dates (9 shows)
Date	City	Country	Venue	Attendance
December 3, 2011	Mie	Japan	Sun Arena	100,000
December 5, 2011	Osaka	Japan	Osaka-jō Hall	100,000
December 6, 2011	Osaka	Japan	Osaka-jō Hall	100,000
December 8, 2011	Nagoya	Japan	Nippon Gaishi Hall	100,000
December 14, 2011	Saitama	Japan	Saitama Super Arena	100,000
December 17, 2011	Fukuoka	Japan	Marine Messe Fukuoka	100,000
December 18, 2011	Fukuoka	Japan	Marine Messe Fukuoka	100,000
December 20, 2011	Tokyo	Japan	Nippon Budokan	100,000
December 21, 2011	Tokyo	Japan	Nippon Budokan	100,000
Total				100,000

=== Six Beautiful Days ===
Tokyo, Japan (May 24–31, 2011)

Main Set

1. "Tired of Waiting"
2. "I Hate You" (remix)
3. "Hot"
4. "Take Off"
5. "10 Out of 10"
6. "Hands Up"
7. Solo stage 1
8. "Beautiful"
9. "Kimi ga Ireba" (君がいれば)
10. "I Can't"
11. "Stay With Me"
12. "Back 2 U"
13. Solo stage 2
14. "Hanareteitemo" (離れていても)
15. "Heartbeat -Japanese ver.-"
16. "I'm Your Man
17. "Don't Stop Can't Stop"

Encore

1. "Thank You"
2. "Ultra Lover"
3. "Take Off"

Solo stages
May 24 – Chansung

1. "Forget-Me-Not" by Yutaka Ozaki
2. "Lay You Down" by Usher

May 25 – Taecyeon

1. "Kiss"
2. "No Tonan Fu (After You Left)" (ノ トナン フ（君が離れたあと）)

May 28 – Wooyoung

1. "Wall to Wall" by Chris Brown
2. "Orion" by Mika Nakashima

May 29 – Nichkhun

1. "Just the Way You Are" by Bruno Mars
2. "I Do" by Rain

May 30 – Jun. K

1. "Just One Night"
2. "Hanareteitemo" (離れていても) & "Writing a Letter" (手紙を書く)

May 31 – Junho

1. "Just a Feeling"
2. "Chocolat" (ショコラ) by Anzen Chitai

Concert dates (8 shows)
Date	City	Country	Venue	Attendance
May 24, 2012	Tokyo	Japan	Nippon Budokan	60,000
May 25, 2012	Tokyo	Japan	Nippon Budokan	60,000
May 28, 2012	Tokyo	Japan	Nippon Budokan	60,000
May 29, 2012	Tokyo	Japan	Nippon Budokan	60,000
May 30, 2012	Tokyo	Japan	Nippon Budokan	60,000
May 31, 2012	Tokyo	Japan	Nippon Budokan	60,000
June 5, 2012	Yokohama	Japan	Yokohama Arena	—
June 6, 2012	Yokohama	Japan	Yokohama Arena	—
Total				N/A

=== Japan Arena Tour 2013: Legend of 2PM ===
Concert dates (15 shows)
Date	City	Country	Venue	Attendance
January 11, 2013	Fukuoka	Japan	Marine Messe Fukuoka	150,000
January 12, 2013	Fukuoka	Japan	Marine Messe Fukuoka	150,000
January 24, 2013	Nagoya	Japan	Nippon Gaishi Hall	150,000
January 25, 2013	Nagoya	Japan	Nippon Gaishi Hall	150,000
January 28, 2013	Osaka	Japan	Osaka-jō Hall	150,000
January 29, 2013	Osaka	Japan	Osaka-jō Hall	150,000
January 30, 2013	Osaka	Japan	Osaka-jō Hall	150,000
February 13, 2013	Tokyo	Japan	Nippon Budokan	150,000
February 14, 2013	Tokyo	Japan	Nippon Budokan	150,000
February 19, 2013	Tokyo	Japan	Yoyogi National Gymnasium	150,000
February 20, 2013	Tokyo	Japan	Yoyogi National Gymnasium	150,000
February 23, 2013	Sapporo	Japan	Hokkaido Prefectural Sports Center	150,000
February 24, 2013	Sapporo	Japan	Hokkaido Prefectural Sports Center	150,000
April 20, 2013	Tokyo	Japan	Tokyo Dome	110,000
April 21, 2013	Tokyo	Japan	Tokyo Dome	110,000
Total				260,000

=== Japan Arena Tour 2014: Genesis of 2PM ===
Concert dates (13 shows)
Date	City	Country	Venue	Attendance
January 27, 2014	Nagoya	Japan	Nippon Gaishi Hall	150,000
January 28, 2014	Nagoya	Japan	Nippon Gaishi Hall	150,000
January 31, 2014	Yokohama	Japan	Yokohama Arena	150,000
February 2, 2014	Yokohama	Japan	Yokohama Arena	150,000
February 22, 2014	Fukuoka	Japan	Marine Messe Fukuoka	150,000
February 23, 2014	Fukuoka	Japan	Marine Messe Fukuoka	150,000
March 4, 2014	Osaka	Japan	Osaka-jō Hall	150,000
March 5, 2014	Osaka	Japan	Osaka-jō Hall	150,000
March 6, 2014	Osaka	Japan	Osaka-jō Hall	150,000
March 17, 2014	Tokyo	Japan	Yoyogi National Gymnasium	150,000
March 18, 2014	Tokyo	Japan	Yoyogi National Gymnasium	150,000
March 25, 2014	Tokyo	Japan	Yoyogi National Gymnasium	150,000
March 26, 2014	Tokyo	Japan	Yoyogi National Gymnasium	150,000
Total				150,000

=== Japan Arena Tour 2015: 2PM of 2PM ===
Concert dates (14 shows)
Date	City	Country	Venue	Attendance
April 7, 2015	Fukuoka	Japan	Marine Messe Fukuoka	150,000
April 8, 2015	Fukuoka	Japan	Marine Messe Fukuoka	150,000
April 14, 2015	Nagoya	Japan	Nippon Gaishi Hall	150,000
April 15, 2015	Nagoya	Japan	Nippon Gaishi Hall	150,000
May 7, 2015	Osaka	Japan	Osaka-jō Hall	150,000
May 8, 2015	Osaka	Japan	Osaka-jō Hall	150,000
May 19, 2015	Yokohama	Japan	Yokohama Arena	150,000
May 20, 2015	Yokohama	Japan	Yokohama Arena	150,000
May 21, 2015	Yokohama	Japan	Yokohama Arena	150,000
May 23, 2015	Tokyo	Japan	Yoyogi National Gymnasium	150,000
May 24, 2015	Tokyo	Japan	Yoyogi National Gymnasium	150,000
May 25, 2015	Tokyo	Japan	Yoyogi National Gymnasium	150,000
May 30, 2015	Sapporo	Japan	Hokkaido Prefectural Sports Center	150,000
May 31, 2015	Sapporo	Japan	Hokkaido Prefectural Sports Center	150,000
Total				150,000

=== 2PM Six "Higher" Days ===
Concert dates (12 shows)
Date	City	Country	Venue	Attendance
October 7, 2015	Tokyo	Japan	Nippon Budokan	130,000
October 8, 2015	Tokyo	Japan	Nippon Budokan	130,000
October 9, 2015	Tokyo	Japan	Nippon Budokan	130,000
October 13, 2015	Osaka	Japan	Osaka-jō Hall	130,000
October 14, 2015	Osaka	Japan	Osaka-jō Hall	130,000
October 15, 2015	Osaka	Japan	Osaka-jō Hall	130,000
October 20, 2015	Yokohama	Japan	Yokohama Arena	130,000
October 21, 2015	Yokohama	Japan	Yokohama Arena	130,000
October 22, 2015	Yokohama	Japan	Yokohama Arena	130,000
October 27, 2015	Nagoya	Japan	Nippon Gaishi Hall	130,000
October 28, 2015	Nagoya	Japan	Nippon Gaishi Hall	130,000
October 29, 2015	Nagoya	Japan	Nippon Gaishi Hall	130,000
Total				130,000

=== Japan Arena Tour 2016: Galaxy of 2PM ===
Concert dates (15 shows)
Date	City	Country	Venue	Attendance
April 23, 2016	Nagoya	Japan	Nippon Gaishi Hall	160,000
April 24, 2016	Nagoya	Japan	Nippon Gaishi Hall	160,000
April 29, 2016	Tokyo	Japan	Yoyogi National Gymnasium	160,000
April 30, 2016	Tokyo	Japan	Yoyogi National Gymnasium	160,000
May 1, 2016	Tokyo	Japan	Yoyogi National Gymnasium	160,000
May 7, 2016	Fukuoka	Japan	Marine Messe Fukuoka	160,000
May 8, 2016	Fukuoka	Japan	Marine Messe Fukuoka	160,000
May 20, 2016	Tokyo	Japan	Yoyogi National Gymnasium	160,000
May 21, 2016	Tokyo	Japan	Yoyogi National Gymnasium	160,000
May 22, 2016	Tokyo	Japan	Yoyogi National Gymnasium	160,000
May 28, 2016	Sapporo	Japan	Hokkaido Prefectural Sports Center	160,000
May 29, 2016	Sapporo	Japan	Hokkaido Prefectural Sports Center	160,000
June 16, 2016	Osaka	Japan	Osaka-jō Hall	160,000
June 17, 2016	Osaka	Japan	Osaka-jō Hall	160,000
June 18, 2016	Osaka	Japan	Osaka-jō Hall	160,000
Total				160,000

=== The 2PM in Tokyo Dome ===
Concert dates (2 shows)
Date	City	Country	Venue	Attendance
October 26, 2016	Tokyo	Japan	Tokyo Dome	100,000
October 27, 2016	Tokyo	Japan	Tokyo Dome	100,000
Total				100,000

== World tours ==
=== Go Crazy World Tour ===
Concert dates (13 shows)
Date	City	Country	Venue	Attendance
Asia
October 3, 2014	Seoul	South Korea	Jamsil Indoor Stadium	14,000
October 4, 2014	Seoul	South Korea	Jamsil Indoor Stadium	14,000
October 11, 2014	Bangkok	Thailand	Impact Arena	10,000
November 1, 2014	Beijing	China	Capital Indoor Stadium	7,000
North America
November 14, 2014	Newark	United States	Prudential Center	—
November 16, 2014	Rosemont	United States	Rosemont Theatre	4,000
November 18, 2014	Grand Prairie	United States	Verizon Theatre	—
November 21, 2014	Los Angeles	United States	Shrine Auditorium	—
Asia
November 29, 2014	Guangzhou	China	Guangzhou International Sports Arena	—
January 17, 2015	Nanjing	China	Nanjing Olympic Sports Center	—
February 14, 2015	Hong Kong	China	AsiaWorld–Arena	10,000
March 28, 2015	Jakarta	Indonesia	Istora Senayan	—
April 4, 2015	Shanghai	China	Mercedes-Benz Arena	—
Total				N/A

== Live showcases ==
Title	Date	City	Country	Venue	Attendance
2PM 1st Contact in Japan Live	December 8, 2010 (Note: 3 events on one day)	Tokyo	Japan	Ryōgoku Kokugikan	25,000
2PM is Back with Genie	May 17, 2013	Seoul	South Korea	Gangnam Station M-Stage	3,000
2PM Xmas Live 2013 in Universal Studios Japan	November 23–24, 2013	Osaka	Japan	Universal Studios Japan	11,000
"Midaretemina" Surprise Party	September 17, 2014	Tokyo	Japan	Roppongi Hills Arena	—
2PM New Year Live 2015 at Universal Studios Japan	January 10–11, 2015	Osaka	Japan	Universal Studios Japan	12,000
The Cafe in Front of My House Tonight (오늘 저녁 집 앞 카페)	July 11, 2021	—N/a	—N/a	Naver Now	—

== Fan meetings ==
Title	Date	City	Country	Venue	Attendance
Hottest 1st Fan Meeting	August 15, 2009	Seoul	South Korea	Kwangwoon University	2,000
Hottest 2nd Fan Meeting	April 3, 2011	Seoul	South Korea	Kwangwoon University	2,000
2PM's The Hottest Party	April 1, 2012	Seoul	South Korea	Kyung Hee University Peace Hall	4,000
The Hottest Awards	September 1, 2013	Seoul	South Korea	Kyung Hee University Peace Hall	3,000
2PM Hottest Japan 1st Fan Club Event "YaZoo"	September 7-8, 2013 (Note: 2 events on each day)	Tokyo	Japan	Yoyogi National Gymnasium 1st Auditorium	48,000
2PM X Hottest 5th Fan Meeting "Class of 2PM" (미친高 아니야?)	December 7, 2014	Seoul	South Korea	Sangmyung University Art Center	—
New Year’s Party 2015 "Old Boy vs Young Boy"	January 3-4, 2015	Saitama	Japan	Saitama Super Arena	40,000
2PM Fan Meeting in Bangkok "Take You Home Tonight"	August 29, 2015	Bangkok	Thailand	Thunder Dome	5,000
2PM X Hottest 6th Fan Meeting "Hot Guys"	November 8, 2015	Seoul	South Korea	Jangchung Gymnasium	—
2PM Wild Beat Fan Meeting (Note: Wooyoung, Junho and Chansung only)	June 17, 2017	Tokyo	Japan	Tokyo International Forum Hall A	—
2PM 13th Anniversary Online Fanmeeting "Dear. Hottest"	September 4, 2021	—N/a	—N/a	Beyond Live	—

== Partial group concerts ==
=== From 2PM to You ===
Date	Members	City	Country	Venue	Attendance
November 3, 2017	Jun. K, Wooyoung, Junho	Yokohama	Japan	Yokohama Arena	—

=== From 2PM to You 2023 ===
Date	Members	City	Country	Venue	Attendance
March 4, 2023	Jun. K, Nichkhun, Wooyoung	Tokyo	Japan	Ariake Arena	—

=== Premium Live 2024 ENWJ ===
Concert dates (2 shows)
Date	Members	City	Country	Venue	Attendance
September 7, 2024	Jun. K, Nichkhun, Wooyoung	Tokyo	Japan	Ariake Arena	—
October 26, 2024	Jun. K, Nichkhun, Wooyoung	Kobe	Japan	World Memorial Hall	—

=== Fan-Con 2024 ENWJ ===
Concert dates (2 shows)
Date	Members	City	Country	Venue	Attendance
November 16, 2024	Jun. K, Nichkhun, Wooyoung	Bangkok	Thailand	Chaengwattana Hall	—
December 7, 2024	Jun. K, Nichkhun, Wooyoung	Taipei	Taiwan	Taipei International Convention Center	—

== Concert participation ==
=== JYP Nation ===
- 2009 JYP Tour
- 2010 Wonder Girls World Tour (Note: Opening act for USA shows)
- JYP Nation 2010 "Team Play"
- JYP Nation 2011 in Japan
- JYP Nation 2012 in Seoul
- JYP Nation 2012 in Japan
- JYP Nation 2014 "One Mic" in Seoul
- JYP Nation 2014 "One Mic" in Hong Kong
- JYP Nation 2014 "One Mic" in Tokyo
- JYP Nation 2014 "One Mic" in Bangkok
- JYP Nation 2016 "Hologram"
- JYP Nation 2016 "Mix & Match"
- KBS Korea's Mega Performance Project – 30th Anniversary Special "Ddanddara JYP" (Note: Jun. K, Nichkhun, Wooyoung, and Chansung only)
- J.Y. Park 30th Anniversary Concert "Still JYP" (2024) (Note: Jun. K, Nichkhun, Taecyeon and Wooyoung only)

=== Other ===
- 2008 Asia Song Festival
- 2009 Incheon Korean Music Wave
- 2009 Dream Concert
- 2010 Korea Times Music Festival
- 2010 Dream Concert
- Everland Cool Concert (2010)
- 2010 Mnet Ultimate Live in Asia (MULA) in Taiwan
- 2010 Mnet Ultimate Live in Asia (MULA) in Thailand
- 2010 Mnet Ultimate Live in Asia (MULA) in Singapore
- 2010 Incheon Korean Music Wave
- 2011 MBC Korean Music Wave in Bangkok
- 2011 Dream Concert
- 2011 Music Bank World Tour in Tokyo
- 2011 Incheon Korean Music Wave
- 2011 K-Pop All Star Live in Niigata
- 2012 Music Bank World Tour in Paris
- 2012 MBC Korean Music Wave in Bangkok
- 2012 Dream Concert
- MBC Korean Music Wave "Love Concert in Kobe 2012"
- 2013 Music Bank World Tour in Jakarta
- 2013 MBC Korean Music Wave in Bangkok
- 2013 Asia Song Festival
- 2013 Korea-China Friendship Concert in Beijing
- Open Concert (L.A. K-Pop Festival) (2014)
- 2014 MBC Korean Music Wave in Beijing
- 2016 KCON Japan
- 2018 Winter Olympics Headliner Show (Note: Nichkhun, Taecyeon, Wooyoung, Junho and Chansung only)
- MMTG "Songs that Deserve a Comeback" Concert (2021)
