= 2PM Best: 2008–2011 in Korea =

2PM Best ~2008–2011 in Korea~
- Regular edition cover

Compilation album by 2PM
- Released: March 14, 2012
- Recorded: 2008–2011
- Genre: K-pop, dance-pop, R&B
- Length: 52:47
- Language: Korean
- Label: Ariola Japan

2PM chronology
Republic of 2PM (2011)	2PM Best ~2008–2011 in Korea~ (2012)	2PM Member's Selection (2012)

2PM Best ~2008–2011 in Korea~ (Japanese: 2PM ベスト ～2008-2011 in コリア～) is the fifth compilation album by South Korean boy band 2PM, released on March 14, 2012 in Japan. The album charted on the Oricon Albums Chart for fourteen weeks, peaking at number five.

== Background ==
The album was announced on 2PM's official Japanese website on January 18, 2012. On February 22, the track list of all editions was announced. The album had three editions: limited CD+DVD, limited CD with bonus tracks and a regular edition. CD Type B edition includes 2 bonus tracks: "Alive", sung by Jun. K, which is already released in South Korea as a digital single and "Move On", sung by Junho and Wooyoung.

== Composition ==
The album contains all Korean singles of the group released from 2008 to 2011 and some tracks from the single albums Hottest Time of the Day, 2:00PM Time for Change, and Don't Stop Can't Stop, the EP Still 02:00PM, and the studio albums 01:59PM and Hands Up.

== Track listing ==
CD+DVD Type A and Regular edition track list:
No.	Title	Lyrics	From the album	Length
1.	"Don't Stop Can't Stop"	J.Y. Park "The Asiansoul"	Don't Stop Can't Stop	4:08
2.	"I'll Be Back"	J.Y. Park "The Asiansoul"	Still 02:00PM	3:34
3.	"Tired of Waiting" (기다리다 지친다; Gidarida jichinda)	Kim Chang-dae "Chang dda-ee"	01:59PM	3:25
4.	"I Was Crazy About You" (너에게 미쳤었다; Neoege michyeosseotda)	Kim Eun-su, Jo Joong-su "FAME-J" (rap making)	01:59PM	3:35
5.	"Heartbeat"	J.Y. Park "The Asiansoul"	01:59PM	3:13
6.	"I Hate You" (니가 밉다; Niga mipda)	Kim Chang-dae "Chang dda-ee"	2:00PM Time for Change	3:06
7.	"Again & Again"	J.Y. Park "The Asiansoul"	2:00PM Time for Change	4:06
8.	"Without U"	J.Y. Park "The Asiansoul"	Don't Stop Can't Stop	3:20
9.	"Maza" (마자; Maja)	Super Changddai	Don't Stop Can't Stop	3:16
10.	"10 Out of 10" (10점 만점에 10점; 10 jeom manjeome 10 jeom)	J.Y. Park "The Asiansoul"	Hottest Time of the Day	3:23
11.	"Hands Up"	J.Y. Park "The Asiansoul"	Hands Up	3:18
12.	"Only You"	J.Y. Park "The Asiansoul"	Hottest Time of the Day	3:59
13.	"I Will Give You My Life" (목숨을 건다; Mokssumeul kkeonda)	Super Changddai	Don't Stop Can't Stop	3:09
14.	"I Can't"	Ra.D	Still 02:00PM	3:09
15.	"Thank You"	J.Y. Park "The Asiansoul"	Hands Up	3:57
Total length:				52:47

Limited CD Type B track list:
No.	Title	Lyrics	Length
16.	"Alive" (Jun. K solo)	Jun. K
17.	"Move On" (Junho and Wooyoung)	Junho

DVD (CD+DVD Type A: JYP NATION in Japan 2011 -2PM Selection-)
No.	Title	Length
1.	"I'm Your Man"
2.	"I Hate You"
3.	"I'll Be Back"
4.	"Heartbeat" (Japanese version)
5.	"Without U" (Japanese version)
6.	"Take Off"
7.	"Hands Up"

== Charts ==
Oricon Chart	Peak	Sales
Daily Albums Chart	2	16,253
Weekly Albums Chart	5	29,024
Monthly Albums Chart	16	35,229
Yearly Albums Chart	163	40,272

== Release history ==
Country	Date	Format	Label
Japan	March 14, 2012	Digital download, CD	Ariola Japan, Sony Music Japan
