= 2PM Member's Selection =

Compilation album by 2PM
- Released: May 21, 2012
- Recorded: 2008–2011
- Genres: Pop, dance-pop, R&B
- Length: 58:30
- Language: Korean
- Label: JYP Entertainment

2PM chronology
2PM Best (2008–2011 in Korea) (2012)	2PM Member's Selection (2012)	Legend of 2PM (2013)

2PM Member's Selection is the sixth compilation album by South Korean boy band 2PM. It was released on May 21, 2012 both digitally and as a CD via JYP Entertainment.

== Background ==
Details of the album were announced on May 18, on the website Naver. They revealed the track list, concept photos, an interview of the group and a preview of the music video for a new version of the song "Only You", previously released on the single Hottest Time of the Day. It was later announced that the physical version of the album was limited to 20,000 copies. The album also includes a 72-page photobook and 8 postcards of the group.

== Composition ==
The album contains tracks from the group's Korean-language single albums, EPs, and studio albums: Hottest Time of the Day, 2:00PM Time for Change, Don't Stop Can't Stop, Still 02:00PM, 01:59PM, and Hands Up. The album also includes two songs from the compilation album 2PM Best ~2008–2011 in Korea~ exclusively released in Japan: the song "Alive", a solo song by Jun. K, which had previously been released as a digital single, and "Move On", a duet sung by Junho and Wooyoung. Songs such as "Only You" were re-recorded to exclude the vocals of Jaebeom, who left the band in 2009.

Along with the album, a music video for "Only You" was released on May 21.

== Track listing ==
Official track list
No.	Title	Lyrics	Music	From the album	Length
1.	"10 Out of 10" (10점 만점에 10점; 10 jeom manjeome 10 jeom)	J.Y. Park "The Asiansoul"	J.Y. Park "The Asiansoul"	Hottest Time of the Day	3:23
2.	"Only You"	J.Y. Park "The Asiansoul"	J.Y. Park "The Asiansoul"	Hottest Time of the Day	3:59
3.	"Again & Again" (어게인 & 어게인; Eogein & eogein)	J.Y. Park "The Asiansoul"	J.Y. Park "The Asiansoul"	2:00PM Time for Change	4:04
4.	"I Hate You" (니가 밉다; Niga mipda)	Kim Chang-dae	Kim Chang-dae	2:00PM Time for Change	3:05
5.	"Maybe She'll Come Back" (돌아올지도 몰라; Dolaoljido molla)	Jo Joong-su "FAME-J"	Jo Joong-su "FAME-J"	2:00PM Time for Change	4:07
6.	"Heartbeat"	J.Y. Park "The Asiansoul"	J.Y. Park "The Asiansoul"	01:59PM	3:13
7.	"Tired of Waiting" (기다리다 지친다; Gidarida jichinda)	Kim Chang-dae	Kim Chang-dae	01:59PM	3:25
8.	"Gimme the Light"	Jo Joong-su "FAME-J"	Jo Joong-su "FAME-J"	01:59PM	4:33
9.	"Don't Stop Can't Stop"	J.Y. Park "The Asiansoul"	J.Y. Park "The Asiansoul"	Don't Stop Can't Stop	4:09
10.	"Without U"	J.Y. Park "The Asiansoul"	J.Y. Park "The Asiansoul"	Don't Stop Can't Stop	3:21
11.	"I'll Be Back"	J.Y. Park "The Asiansoul"	J.Y. Park "The Asiansoul"	Still 2:00PM	3:35
12.	"I Can't"	Ra.D	Ra.D	Still 02:00PM	3:21
13.	"Hands Up"	J.Y. Park "The Asiansoul"	J.Y. Park "The Asiansoul"	Hands Up	3:17
14.	"Give It to Me"	Junho	Junho	Hands Up	3:39
15.	"Hot"	Jun. K	Jun. K	Hands Up	3:30
16.	"Thank You"	J.Y. Park "The Asiansoul"	J.Y. Park "The Asiansoul"	Hands Up	3:30
17.	"Alive" (Jun. K solo)	Chance, Jun.K	Chance, Jun.K	2PM Best ~2008–2011 in Korea~	4:05
18.	"Move On" (Junho and Wooyoung)	Junho	Junho, Hong Ji-sang	2PM Best ~2008–2011 in Korea~	4:03
Total length:					58:30

- In the iTunes Store version, the album was divided into 2 discs with 9 tracks each, with the song "Alive" on disc 1 and "Move On" on disc 2 (both songs are listed as track 9).

== Chart performance ==
Chart performance for 2PM Member's Selection
Chart	Peak position
South Korea Gaon Weekly Albums	1
South Korea Gaon Monthly Albums	9
Japan Oricon Weekly Albums	83

Sales for 2PM Member's Selection
Chart	Amount
Gaon physical sales	20,000
Oricon sales	2,541+

== Release history ==
Country	Date	Format	Label
South Korea	May 21, 2012	Digital download, CD	JYP Entertainment
