= Jun. K discography =

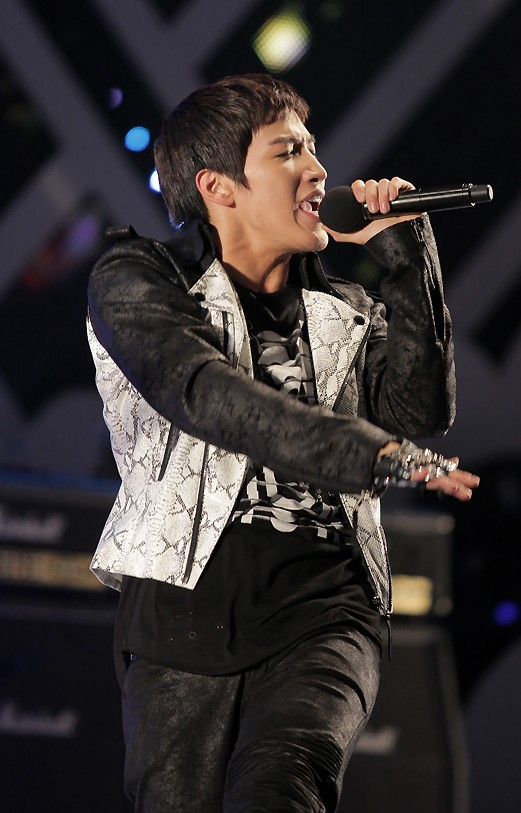
- Jun. K in 2011
- EPs: 11
- Compilation albums: 1
- Singles: 20

South Korean singer Jun. K has released one compilation album, eleven extended plays, and twenty singles. He is known as the main vocalist of the boy group 2PM.

His 2nd Japanese solo album Love Letter ranked 1st on both Billboard Japan "Top" and "Hot" album sales charts. His first Korean solo album Mr. No♡ debuted at No. 9 on the Billboard World Albums chart. His third Japanese solo album No Shadow ranked second on the Billboard Japan "Top" and "Hot" album sales charts. His fourth Japanese album No Time ranked number three on the Oricon daily sales chart.

== Albums ==
=== Compilation albums ===
List of compilation albums, with selected chart positions and sales figures
Title	Album details	Peak chart positions	
Title	Album details	JPN	JPN Hot
The Best	Released: December 13, 2023 (JPN); Label: Epic Records Japan; Formats: CD, digital download; Track listing: 1. "Love & Hate"; 2. "No Music No Life" (feat. Ai); 3. "With You"; 4. "Real Love" (feat. Lang Lang); 5. "No Love"; 6. "True Swag"; 7. "Write a Letter"; 8. "WHPH"; 9. "Love Letter"; 10. "Better Man"; 11. "Everest" (album ver.); 12. "No Shadow"; 13. "Think About You" (Japanese ver.); 14. "Lost Boy ~The Boy Who Lost His Way~"; 15. "Ms. No Time"; 16. "Comma"; 17. "This Is Not a Song, 1929"; 18. "River Flows, 1971"; 19. "In the Car, 1981"; 20. "Command C+Me"	7	7

== Extended plays ==
List of EPs, with selected details, peak chart positions and sales figures
Title	EP details	Peak chart positions				Sales
Title	EP details	KOR	JPN	JPN Hot (Note: Billboard Japan Hot Albums Chart was launched on June 4, 2015.)	US World	Sales
Korean
Mr. No♡	Released: August 9, 2016; Label: JYP Entertainment; Formats: CD, digital download; Track listing: 1. "Mr. No♡"; 2. "Think About You"; 3. "Better Man"; 4. "Young Forever"; 5. "Ocean Waves" (파도타기); 6. "My House" (우리집; solo ver.); 7. "Don't Leave Me" (가지마; feat. Baek A-yeon); 8. "No Love Part 2" (feat. San E)	5	9	—	9	KOR: 25,700+; JPN: 4,921
77-1X3-00	Released: January 12, 2017; Label: JYP Entertainment; Formats: CD, digital download; Track listing: 1. "Alive Pt2"; 2. "No Shadow"; 3. "No Goodbye"; 4. "Phone Call"; 5. "Mary Poppins"; 6. "Good Morning"; 7. "Walking on the Moon"; 8. "Just One Night"; 9. "Love Letter" (remix); 10. "Your Wedding" (결혼식)	5	29	56	—	JPN: 2,704
My 20's	Released: November 30, 2017; Label: JYP Entertainment; Formats: CD, digital download; Track listing: 1. "Honestly" (솔직히 말할게); 2. "Nov to Feb" (11월부터 2월까지; feat. Somi); 3. "A Moving Day" (이사하는 날); 4. "Why" (왜; feat. Park Jimin); 5. "My 20's" (나의 20대; feat. Double K)	6	32	—	—	KOR: 8,961+; JPN: 2,230
20 Minutes	Released: December 9, 2020; Label: JYP Entertainment; Formats: CD, digital download; Track listing: 1. "House" (집); 2. "Sketchbook" (스케치북); 3. "30 Minutes Might Be Too Long" (30분은 거절할까 봐); 4. "Slip 'n Slide" (미끄럼틀); 5. "Parallel Lines" (폄행선); 6. "Comma" (쉄표; Korean ver.); 7. "Ms. No Time" (Korean ver.)	10	40	70	—	KOR: 9,408
Dear My Muse	Released: September 1, 2025; Label: JYP Entertainment; Formats: CD, digital download, streaming; Track listing: 1. "Privacy"; 2. "R&B Me" (featuring Changbin); 3. "All on You" (featuring Youha); 4. "Largo"; 5. "Happy Ending"	18	—	—	—	KOR: 21,275
Japanese
Love & Hate	Released: May 14, 2014; Label: Epic Records Japan; Formats: CD, digital download; Track listing: 1. "Love & Hate"; 2. "No Music No Life"; 3. "With You"; 4. "Mr. Doctor"; 5. "Real Love"; 6. "No Love"; 7. "True Swag Part 2"; 8. "Writing a Letter"; 9. "Love & Hate" (instrumental)	—	2	—	—	JPN: 45,707+
Love Letter	Released: November 25, 2015; Label: Epic Records Japan; Formats: CD, digital download; Track listing: 1. "Love Letter"; 2. "Better Man"; 3. "Good Morning"; 4. "Walking on the Moon"; 5. "Hold Me Tight"; 6. "Love Letter" (instrumental); 7. "Sorry"; 8. "Love Game"; 9. "Everest" (album ver.)	—	2	1	—	JPN: 36,241
No Shadow	Released: December 14, 2016; Label: Epic Records Japan; Formats: CD, digital download; Track listing: 1. "No Shadow"; 2. "Mary Poppins"; 3. "Phone Call"; 4. "Mr. No♡" (Japanese ver.); 5. "Think About You" (Japanese ver.); 6. "No Shadow" (instrumental); 7. "Lost Boy" (道をなくした少年); 8. "Young Forever" (Japanese ver.); 9. "50 50" (album ver.)	—	2	2	—	JPN: 33,392
No Time	Released: April 4, 2018; Label: Epic Records Japan; Formats: CD, digital download; Track listing: 1. "Switch Me"; 2. "Ms. No Time"; 3. "Comma"; 4. "Our Farewell Talk" (私たちの別れた話; with May J.); 5. "Moving" (引っ越し); 6. "No Shadow" (instrumental); 7. "Why" (なぜ); 8. "As It Is" (心のままに); 9. "Ms. No Time" (taalthechoi remix)	—	5	8	—	JPN: 14,712
This Is Not a Song	Released: March 10, 2021; Label: Epic Records Japan; Formats: CD, digital download; Track listing: 1. "Moon Light, 2003"; 2. "This Is Not a Song, 1929"; 3. "Magritte in My Room, 2013"; 4. "Hide and Seek, 1995"; 5. "River Flows, 1971"; 6. "In the Car, 1981"	—	7	8	—	JPN: 8,038
O/N	Released: March 19, 2025; Label: Epic Records Japan; Formats: CD, digital download; Track listing: 1. "Automatic"; 2. "Mayonaka No Door ~Stay With Me" (真夜中のドア～Stay With Me); 3. "Plastic Love" (プラスティック・ラブ); 4. "Kiss" (接吻); 5. "Remember Summer Days"; 6. "Aino Katachi" (アイノカタチ); 7. "Sakura Iro Mau Koro" (桜色舞うころ; When the Cherry Blossoms Dance)	—	7	—	—	JPN: 10,045

== Singles ==
List of singles, with selected peak chart positions and sales figures
Title	Year	Peak chart position		Sales (Digital download)	Album
Title	Year	KOR	JPN Hot	Sales (Digital download)	Album
Korean
"Alive"	2011	—	—	—N/a	Non-album single
"No Love"	2014	—	—	—N/a	Non-album single
"Love Letter"	2015	354	—	—N/a	Non-album single
"Think About You"	2016	124	—	KOR: 9,696+	Mr. No♡
"Young Forever"	2016	—	—	—N/a	Mr. No♡
"Your Wedding" (결혼식)	2017	—	—	—N/a	77-1x3-00
"No Shadow"	2017	—	—	—N/a	77-1x3-00
"Nov to Feb" (feat. Jeon Somi)	2017	—	—	—N/a	My 20's
"A Moving Day" (이사하는 날)	2017	—	—	—N/a	My 20's
"This Is Not a Song, 1929"	2020	—	—	—N/a	Non-album single
"30 Minutes Might Be Too Long" (30분은 거절할까 봐)	2020	—	—	—N/a	20 Minutes
"Paint This Love"	2024	— (Note: "Paint This Love" did not enter the Circle Digital Chart, but peaked at number 71 on the composite Download Chart.)	—	—N/a	Non-album single
"R&B Me" (featuring Changbin)	2025	— (Note: "R&B Me" did not enter the Circle Digital Chart, but peaked at number 133 on the composite Download Chart.)	—	—N/a	Dear My Muse
"Midnight Ticket"	2026	— (Note: "Midnight Ticket" did not enter the Circle Digital Chart, but peaked at number 149 on the composite Download Chart.)	—	—N/a	Non-album single
"Your Lips" (feat. Wendy)	2026	— (Note: "Your Lips" did not chart on the Circle Digital Chart, but peaked at number 80 on the composite Download Chart.)	—	—N/a	Non-album single
Japanese
"Love & Hate"	2014	—	22	—N/a	Love & Hate
"No Love"	2014	—	—	—N/a	Love & Hate
"Love Letter"	2015	—	—	—N/a	Love Letter
"No Shadow"	2016	—	—	—N/a	No Shadow
"Ms. No Time"	2018	—	—	—N/a	No Time
"This Is Not a Song, 1929"	2021	—	—	—N/a	This Is Not a Song
"Command C+Me"	2023	—	—	—N/a	The Best
"Automatic"	2025	—	—	—N/a	O/N
"—" denotes releases that did not chart or were not released in that region

== Soundtrack appearances and collaborations ==
Year	Album	Title	Artist
2010	Non-album single	"Tok Tok Tok" (뚝뚝뚝; Ttukttukttuk)	Jun. K & Jung Woo
2010	Everybody Ready?	"B.U.B.U." (feat. Jun. K)	San E
2010	Non-album single	"Let's Go" (2010 G-20 Seoul summit song)	List of Artists Jun. K, Lala, Anna, G.NA, IU, Son Dam-bi, Seo In-guk, Bumkey, Changmin, Gayoon, Kahi, Gyuri, G.O, Junhyung, Jonghyun, Sungmin, Min, Seohyun, Luna, Jaekyung, Jieun
2010	Non-album single	"Music" (2010 MAMA theme song)	Jun. K, Narsha, JeA, 8Eight, Supreme Team, Boohwal
2011	Rainy Days	"Rainy Days" (feat. Jun. K)	One Way
2011	Watch	"Sunshine" (with Jun. K)	Kan Mi-youn
2011	Woman	"Count 3" (feat. Jun. K)	Double
2011	Dream High OST	"Don't Go" (가지마; Gajima)	with Lim Jeong-hee
2012	23, Male, Single	"DJ Got Me Goin' Crazy" (feat. Jun. K)	Jang Wooyoung
2012	I'm Baek	"Always" (feat. Jun. K)	Baek A-yeon
2012	I Love Lee Tae-ri OST	"Love... Goodbye" (사랑... 안녕; Sarang... Annyeong)	
2014	Non-album single	"Just As It Is" (있는 그대로; Issneun Geudaero) (feat. Jun. K)	Lel
2014	Red Carpet OST	"Come Back"	
2015	Once in a Lifetime	"Everytime Everyday" (feat. Jun. K)	Kim Johan
2015	Non-album single	"Chameleon" (feat. Jun. K)	SIMON
2016	DSMN	"Hyper" (feat. Jun. K)	Junho
2017	T-WITH	"Just Feeling" (느낌적인 느낌) (feat. Jun. K and Taecyeon)	Kim Tae-woo

== Songwriting and composing credits ==
Title	Year	Artist	Album	Notes
"Don't Go" (가지마; Gajima)	2011	Jun. K & Lim Jeong-hee	Dream High OST	
"Sunshine" (with Jun. K)	2011	Kan Mi-youn	Watch	
"Hot"	2011	2PM	Hands Up	
"Alive"	2011	Jun. K	Non-album single	
"Hanarete Itemo" (離れていても; Even When We're Apart)	2011	2PM	Republic of 2PM	
"No Goodbyes"	2012	One Day (2PM & 2AM)	One Day	
"DJ Got Me Goin' Crazy" (feat. Jun. K)	2012	Jang Wooyoung feat. Jun. K	23, Male, Single	
"Always" (feat. Jun. K)	2012	Baek A-yeon feat. Jun. K	I'm Baek	
"Sunshine"	2012	Jun. K	My Little Hero OST	
"True Swag"	2013	Jun. K	Legend of 2PM	
"Game Over"	2013	2PM	Grown	
"At Times" (문득; Mundeuk)	2013	2PM	Grown	Korean version of "Even When We're Apart"
"True Swag"	2013	Jun. K	Grown (Grand Edition)	Korean version
"Falling in Love"	2014	2PM	Genesis of 2PM	Originally released as the B-side of the 2PM single "Give Me Love"
"So Wonderful"	2014	Nichkhun	Genesis of 2PM	Limited Edition B bonus track (disc 2)
"Love & Hate"	2014	Jun. K	Love & Hate	
"No Music No Life" (feat. Ai)	2014	Jun. K	Love & Hate	
"With You"	2014	Jun. K	Love & Hate	
"Mr. Doctor"	2014	Jun. K	Love & Hate	
"Real Love" (feat. Lang Lang)	2014	Jun. K	Love & Hate	
"No Love"	2014	Jun. K	Love & Hate	Limited Edition B bonus track
"True Swag Part 2" (feat. Simon)	2014	Jun. K	Love & Hate	Limited Edition B bonus track
"Writing a Letter" (手紙を書く; Tegami wo Kaku)	2014	Jun. K	Love & Hate	Limited Edition B bonus track
"Go Crazy!" (미친 거 아니야?; Michin geo Aniya?)	2014	2PM	Go Crazy!	
"Goodbye Trip" (이별 여행; Ibyeol Yeohaeng)	2014	2PM	Go Crazy!	
"Superman"	2014	Jun. K & Wooyoung	Go Crazy! (Grand Edition)	
"Brodia" (ブローディア; Burōdia)	2014	Tomohisa Yamashita	You	
"So Lucky"	2014	Got7	Around the World	
"Midaretemina" (ミダレテミナ; Go Crazy!)	2015	2PM	2PM of 2PM	Japanese version
"Sexy Ladies"	2015	2PM	2PM of 2PM	
"Work Hard Play Hard"	2015	Jun. K	2PM of 2PM	Limited Edition B bonus track (disc 2)
"My House" (우리집; Urijib)	2015	2PM	No.5	
"Not the Only One" (너만의 남자; Neomanui Namja)	2015	2PM	No.5	
"Higher"	2015	2PM	Higher	
"My House" (Japanese ver.)	2015	2PM	Higher	
"My House" (Japanese ver.; without main vocal)	2015	2PM	Higher	
"Love Letter"	2015	Jun. K	Love Letter	
"Better Man"	2015	Jun. K	Love Letter	
"Good Morning"	2015	Jun. K	Love Letter	
"Walking on the Moon"	2015	Jun. K	Love Letter	
"Hold Me Tight"	2015	Jun. K	Love Letter	
"Sorry"	2015	Jun. K	Love Letter	Limited Edition B bonus tracks
"Love Game"	2015	Jun. K	Love Letter	Limited Edition B bonus tracks
"Everest"	2015	Jun. K	Love Letter	Limited Edition B bonus tracks
"50 50"	2016	Jun. K & Taecyeon	Galaxy of 2PM	Limited Edition B bonus track
"Mr. No♡"	2016	Jun. K	Mr. No♡	
"Think About You"	2016	Jun. K	Mr. No♡	
"Better Man"	2016	Jun. K	Mr. No♡	
"Young Forever"	2016	Jun. K	Mr. No♡	
"Surfing"	2016	Jun. K	Mr. No♡	
"My House" (solo ver.)	2016	Jun. K	Mr. No♡	
"Don't Go" (feat. Baek A-yeon)	2016	Jun. K	Mr. No♡	
"No Love Part 2" (feat. San E)	2016	Jun. K	Mr. No♡	
"No Shadow"	2016	Jun. K	No Shadow	
"Mary Poppins"	2016	Jun. K	No Shadow	
"Phone Call"	2016	Jun. K	No Shadow	
"Mr. No♡" (Japanese ver.)	2016	Jun. K	No Shadow	
"Think About You" (Japanese ver.)	2016	Jun. K	No Shadow	
"Lost Boy"	2016	Jun. K	No Shadow	Limited Edition B bonus tracks
"Young Forever" (Japanese ver.)	2016	Jun. K	No Shadow	Limited Edition B bonus tracks
"50 50" (solo ver.)	2016	Jun. K	No Shadow	Limited Edition B bonus tracks
"Alive Part 2"	2017	Jun. K	77-1x3-00	
"No Shadow" (Korean ver.)	2017	Jun. K	77-1x3-00	
"No Goodbyes" (solo ver.)	2017	Jun. K	77-1x3-00	
"Phone Call" (Korean ver.)	2017	Jun. K	77-1x3-00	
"Mary Poppins" (Korean ver.)	2017	Jun. K	77-1x3-00	
"Good Morning" (Korean ver.)	2017	Jun. K	77-1x3-00	
"Walking On The Moon" (Korean ver.)	2017	Jun. K	77-1x3-00	
"Just One Night"	2017	Jun. K	77-1x3-00	
"Love Letter" (remix)	2017	Jun. K	77-1x3-00	
"Your Wedding"	2017	Jun. K	77-1x3-00	
"느낌적인 느낌" (co-written and co-composed)	2017	Kim Tae-woo feat. Jun. K and Taecyeon	T-WITH	
"I'll Be Honest"	2017	Jun. K	My 20's	
"Nov to Feb" (feat. Somi)	2017	Jun. K	My 20's	
"Moving Day"	2017	Jun. K	My 20's	
"Why" (feat. Park Jimin)	2017	Jun. K	My 20's	
"My 20's" (feat. Double K)	2017	Jun. K	My 20's	
"Switch Me"	2018	Jun. K	No Time	
"Ms. NO TIME"	2018	Jun. K	No Time	
"Comma"	2018	Jun. K	No Time	
"Our Farewell Talk" (with May J.)	2018	Jun. K	No Time	
"Why"	2018	Jun. K	No Time	
"As It Is"	2018	Jun. K	No Time	
"Ms. NO TIME" (Taalthechoi remix)	2018	Jun. K	No Time	
"This Is Not A Song, 1929"	2020	Jun. K	This Is Not A Song	
"Ok Or Not"	2021	2PM	Must	
"On My Way"	2021	2PM	Must	
"Hold You"	2021	2PM	Must	
"My House" (acoustic ver.)	2021	2PM	Must	
"With Me Again" (僕とまた; Boku to Mata)	2021	2PM	With Me Again	
"Urahara"	2021	2PM	With Me Again	
"With Me Again" (Taalthechoi remix)	2021	2PM	With Me Again	
"My House" (Japanese ver.; acoustic ver.)	2021	2PM	With Me Again	
"Command C+Me"	2023	Jun. K	The Best	

== See also ==
- 2PM discography
- List of songs recorded by 2PM
