= Republic of 2PM =

- Regular edition cover

Studio album by 2PM
- Released: November 30, 2011
- Recorded: 2011
- Genres: Pop, dance-pop
- Length: 42:50
- Language: Japanese
- Label: Ariola Japan

2PM chronology
Hands Up (2011)	Republic of 2PM (2011)	2PM Best ~2008–2011 in Korea~ (2012)

Singles from Republic of 2PM
- 1. "Take Off" Released: May 18, 2011; 2. "I'm Your Man" Released: August 17, 2011; 3. "Ultra Lover" Released: November 2, 2011

Republic of 2PM is the first Japanese studio album (third album overall) by South Korean boy band 2PM. It was released on November 30, 2011 in three editions: two CD+DVD editions and a regular edition.

== Composition ==
The album includes eight original Japanese songs. It also includes Japanese versions from each lead single from their Korean EPs and albums, most notably, "Heartbeat" from 01:59PM, "Without U" from Don't Stop Can't Stop, "I'll Be Back" from Still 2:00PM and "Hands Up" from the album with same name. It also includes a song written by the member Jun. K dedicated to the group's fans titled "Hanarete Itemo" (離れていても, Even When We're Apart).

== Singles ==
The album has three singles. The lead single of the album (and also their Japanese debut single) is "Take Off". It was released on May 18, 2011 and sold more than 75,000 copies at the date.

The second single is the song "I'm Your Man". It was released on August 17, 2011 and sold more than 85,000 copies at the date.

The third and last single from the album is "Ultra Lover". It was released on November 2, 2011 and has sold more than 100,000 copies at the date. This is the first single of the group to get certified Gold by RIAJ.

All singles peaked number 4 in Oricon's Weekly chart.

== Promotions ==
To promote the album, the band released a music video for the song "Hands Up". It premiered on the Japanese major music channels on November 21, 2011.

== Track listings ==
All editions track listing
No.	Title	Lyrics	Music	Length
1.	"I'm Your Man"	J.Y. Park "The Asiansoul", Yu Shimoji, JiN	J.Y. Park "The Asiansoul", Super Changddai	3:10
2.	"Ultra Lover"	Super Changddai, Yu Shimoji, NICE73	Super Changddai	3:22
3.	"I'll Be Back" (Japanese version)	J.Y. Park "The Asiansoul", Kenn Kato, KOMU	J.Y. Park "The Asiansoul"	3:39
4.	"Stay with Me"	Kenn Kato, KOMU	Tommy Park	3:30
5.	"Without U" (Japanese version)	J.Y. Park "The Asiansoul", Yu Shimoji, KOMU	J.Y. Park "The Asiansoul"	3:23
6.	"Crazy in Love"	J.Y. Park "The Asiansoul", EMI K. Lynn, NICE73	J.Y. Park "The Asiansoul", Yosuke Nimbari	3:31
7.	"100th Day Anniversary" (100日記念日, 100-Nichi kinenbi)	H.U.B., NICE73	Hong Ji Sang, Tommy Park	3:47
8.	"Take Off"	Kenn Kato, KOMU	J.Y. Park "The Asiansoul", Super Changddai, Akihito Tanaka	3:24
9.	"Hands Up" (Japanese version)	J.Y. Park "The Asiansoul", PA-NON, NICE73	J.Y. Park "The Asiansoul"	3:21
10.	"Fate" (運命, Unmei)	Kenn Kato, NICE73	Super Changddai	3:40
11.	"Heartbeat" (Japanese version)	J.Y. Park "The Asiansoul", Yu Shimoji, Shoko Fujibayashi, KOMU	J.Y. Park "The Asiansoul"	3:19
12.	"Even When We're Apart" (離れていても, Hanarete ite mo)	Jun. K, Kenn Kato	Jun. K	4:44
Total length:				42:50

DVD (Type A)
No.	Title	Length
1.	"2010.12.8 Documentary movie held on Ryogoku Kokugikan [1st Contact in Japan]" (2010.12.8に両国国技館にて行われた「1st Contact in Japan」のライブ映像+その来日時のドキュメンタリームービー)

DVD (Type B)
No.	Title	Length
1.	"Album jacket shooting" (Offshoot movie)
2.	"Take Off" (Music video)
3.	"I'm Your Man" (Music video)
4.	"Ultra Lover" (Music video)
5.	"Hands Up" (Japanese version) (Music video)

== Charts ==
Oricon

Oricon Chart	Peak	Debut sales	Total sales
Daily Albums Chart	2	25,756 (Daily); 50,265 (Weekly)	73,510
Weekly Albums Chart	4	25,756 (Daily); 50,265 (Weekly)	73,510
Monthly Albums Chart	13	25,756 (Daily); 50,265 (Weekly)	73,510
Yearly Albums Chart	113	25,756 (Daily); 50,265 (Weekly)	73,510

Other charts

Chart	Peak position
Billboard Japan Top Albums	4

== Release history ==
Country	Date	Format	Label
Japan	November 30, 2011	Digital download, CD	Ariola Japan, Sony Music Japan
Taiwan	December 9, 2011	CD	Sony Music Taiwan
South Korea	January 18, 2012	Digital download	JYP Entertainment
