= Ultra Lover =

- Regular edition cover

Single by 2PM

from the album Republic of 2PM
- B-side: "I'll Be Back (Japanese ver.)"
- Released: November 2, 2011
- Recorded: 2011
- Genre: J-pop; Dance-pop
- Length: 3:22
- Label: Ariola Japan
- Songwriters: Shimoji Y; Fukuda N; Kim C

2PM singles chronology
"I'm Your Man" (2011)	"Ultra Lover" (2011)	"Beautiful" (2012)

Music video
- "Ultra Lover" on YouTube

"Ultra Lover" is the third Japanese single by South Korean boy band 2PM. It was released on November 2, 2011 by Ariola Japan, peaking at number 4 on the Oricon Singles Chart. "Ultra Lover" became 2PM's first single to be certified Gold by the Recording Industry Association of Japan in December 2011.

== Background and release ==
"Ultra Lover" is an upbeat dance-pop song with a synth beat about falling in love, composed by Super Changddai and written by Super Changddai, Yu Shimoji, and Fukuda Nana (also known as Nice73). The single was announced on October 7, 2011, with a teaser for the song's music video being released on October 7 via 2PM's official Japanese website. The full music video premiered on October 9 on the Japanese TV network Space Shower TV, although 2PM member Taecyeon does not appear in any choreography scenes of the music video due to an injury sustained during the Seoul concert of 2PM's Hands Up Asia Tour.

The single was released on November 2, 2011, in three editions: CD + DVD, CD + Photobook, and a Regular edition. The B-side of the single is a Japanese version of their Korean song "I'll Be Back", which served as the lead single of their 2010 EP titled Still 02:00PM. The single was simultaneously released with the group's second concert DVD, 1st Japan Tour 2011 "Take Off" in Makuhari Messe.

== Promotions ==
The group first performed the song live at the winter light show event VenusFort Illumination 11-12 on November 3, 2011. The group also performed the song on the November 12, 2011 episode of Happy Music, November 26, 2011 episode of Music Fair, and the December 11, 2011 episode of Music Japan.

"Ultra Lover" was also used to promote the group's first Japanese studio album, Republic of 2PM, released just weeks later, on November 30, 2011, as well as the group's first arena tour in Japan, also titled Republic of 2PM, from December 5 to 21, 2011. 2PM held a "Hi Touch" fan event for purchasers of "Ultra Lover" on December 10, 2011 at the Makuhari Messe.

== Track listing ==
CD+DVD and CD-only track listing
No.	Title	Lyrics	Music	Length
1.	"Ultra Lover"	Yu Shimoji; Super Changddai; nice73	Super Changddai	3:22
2.	"I'll Be Back" (Japanese ver.)	J.Y. Park "The Asiansoul"; Kenn Kato; Komu	J.Y. Park	3:39
3.	"Ultra Lover" (without main vocal)		Super Changddai	3:22
4.	"I'll Be Back" (Japanese ver.) (without main vocal)		J.Y. Park	3:36
Total length:				13:57

DVD
No.	Title	Length
1.	"Ultra Lover" (music video)
2.	"I'll Be Back" (music video - Korean version)
3.	"Ultra Lover Jacket Shooting Making Movie"

== Charts ==
=== Oricon ===
Oricon Chart	Peak	Debut sales	Sales total	Ref.
Daily Singles Chart	3	65,367	100,000+	
Weekly Singles Chart	4	65,367	100,000+	
Monthly Singles Chart	9	65,367	100,000+	
Yearly Singles Chart	84	65,367	100,000+	

=== Other Charts ===
Chart	Peak Position	Ref.
Billboard Japan Hot 100	6	
Japan RIAJ Digital Track Weekly Top 100	29	
South Korea Gaon Weekly Singles	141	
South Korea Gaon Weekly International Singles	14	
South Korea Gaon Monthly International Singles	58	

=== Sales and certifications ===
Chart	Amount	Ref.
RIAJ physical shipping certification	Gold (100,000+)	

== Release history ==
Country	Date	Format	Label	Ref.
Japan	November 2, 2011	CD, CD + DVD, CD + Photobook, Digital download	Ariola Japan	
Taiwan	November 14, 2011	CD + DVD, CD + Photobook	Sony Music Taiwan	
