= I'm Your Man (2PM song) =

- Type B cover

Single by 2PM

from the album Republic of 2PM
- B-side: "Without U (Japanese ver.)"
- Released: August 17, 2011
- Recorded: 2011
- Genre: J-pop; K-pop; Dance-pop
- Length: 3:12
- Label: Ariola Japan
- Composers: Park Jin-young; Super Changddai
- Lyricists: Park Jin-young; Yu Shimoji; Komu

2PM singles chronology
"Hands Up" (2011)	"I'm Your Man" (2011)	"Ultra Lover" (2011)

Music video
- "I'm Your Man" on YouTube

"I'm Your Man" is the second Japanese single by South Korean boy band 2PM, released on August 17, 2011 by Ariola Japan. The music video of the song won the award for Best Group Video at the 2012 MTV Video Music Awards Japan. In 2014, a Korean version of the song was included in 2PM's Korean studio album Go Crazy!

== Composition ==
"I'm Your Man" is a dance-pop song written from the perspective of a man who wants to protect their loved one. In contrast to their debut Japanese single, "Take Off", which showed a more youthful and "refreshing" side to the group, "I'm Your Man" showcased the group's "beast idol" and masculine image seen in their previous Korean releases. This was particularly evident in the choreography of the song, which features removing and dancing with neckties. In 2018, as part of the 10th anniversary since 2PM's debut, Japanese fans voted "I'm Your Man" as the group's second "best sexy song", earning it a place in the digital compilation album 2PM Awards Selection.

The B-side is a Japanese version of their Korean song "Without U", which served as the lead single of their 2010 EP Don't Stop Can't Stop.

== Music video ==
A teaser of the music video was released on July 5, 2011 on 2PM's official Japanese website. The full music video premiered on MTV Japan on July 30. In the music video, the members are dressed in formal attire.

== Promotion ==
2PM first performed "I'm Your Man" and B-side track "Without U" (Japanese ver.) at the Jingu Gaien Fireworks Festival in Tokyo on August 6, 2011. They then performed the song on Japanese television shows, such as TV Asahi's music program Music Station on August 26, Happy Music on August 27, Monthly MelodiX! on August 27, and Music Japan on August 28. The song was also performed at the 2012 MTV Video Music Awards Japan on June 23, 2012, along with "Beautiful".

In promotion of the single, 2PM appeared as the monthly guest for Space Shower TV's Korean Hits Ranking every Thursday of August 2011. 2PM held a "Hi Touch" event with an attendance of 50,000 fans at Pacifico Yokohama on August 21, 2011.

The Korean version of the song, which was released on September 14, 2014 as part of 2PM's fourth Korean studio album, Go Crazy!, was performed on South Korean television music programs in promotion of the album starting on the September 11, 2014 episode of M Countdown.

== Track listing ==
All lyrics are written by J.Y. Park "The Asiansoul", Yu Shimoji, and KOMU.

CD+DVD and CD-only track listing
No.	Title	Writer(s)	Length
1.	"I'm Your Man"	J.Y. Park "The Asiansoul"; Super Changddai	3:12
2.	"Without U" (Japanese ver.)	J.Y. Park "The Asiansoul"; Tommy Park	3:21
3.	"I'm Your Man" (without main vocal)		3:12
4.	"Without U" (Japanese ver.; without main vocal)		3:22
Total length:			13:06

DVD
No.	Title	Length
1.	"I'm Your Man" (music video)
2.	"I'm Your Man" (music video – dance ver.)

== Charts ==
Oricon Chart	Peak	Debut sales	Sales total	Ref.
Japan (Oricon Daily)	3	69,383	84,298	
Japan (Oricon Weekly)	4	69,383	84,298	
Japan (Oricon Monthly)	9	69,383	84,298	
Japan (Oricon Yearly)	91	69,383	84,298	

=== Other charts ===
Chart	Peak Position	Ref.
Billboard Japan Hot 100	3	
Japan RIAJ Digital Track	26	
South Korea Gaon Weekly Singles	69	
South Korea Gaon Weekly International Singles	2	
South Korea Gaon Monthly Singles	140	
South Korea Gaon Monthly International Singles	6	

== Awards ==
Year	Organization	Award	Result	Ref.
2012	MTV Video Music Awards Japan	Best Group Video	Won	

== Release history ==
Country	Date	Format	Label	Ref.
Japan	August 17, 2011	CD, Digital download	Ariola Japan	
South Korea	August 18, 2011	Digital download	JYP Entertainment	
