= Hands Up (2PM song) =

2011 single by 2PM

Single by 2PM

from the album Hands Up
- Released: June 20, 2011
- Recorded: 2011
- Genre: K-pop; Dance-pop; Electropop
- Length: 3:18
- Label: JYP
- Songwriter: Park Jin-young
- Producer: Park Jin-young

2PM singles chronology
"Take Off" (2011)	"Hands Up" (2011)	"I'm Your Man" (2012)

Music video
- "Hands Up" on YouTube "Hands Up (East4A mix)" on YouTube "Hands Up (Japanese ver.)" on YouTube

"Hands Up" is a song recorded by South Korean boy band 2PM. It was released as the lead single of their second studio album, Hands Up, on June 20, 2011 via JYP Entertainment. "Hands Up" saw both domestic and international popularity, becoming 2PM's first song to chart on Billboard's newly-launched K-pop Hot 100 and resulting in the group's appearance on Billboard's Social 50 Chart. It was the group's second number-one song on the Gaon Digital Chart.

== Background and release ==
"Hands Up" is an upbeat dance-pop club song featuring prominent synths and drums, written and composed by JYP Entertainment founder Park Jin-young. Unlike their recent singles such as "Without U" and "I'll Be Back", which were more emotional and generally focused on heartbreak, "Hands Up" was chosen as a title track to show a more fun and youthful side of the group, much like their debut single, "10 Out of 10".

The song includes a vocal cameo by labelmate and Wonder Girls member Ahn So-hee, who sings one line in the song; the line was originally intended for f(x) member Krystal Jung, but plans for the collaboration fell through due to Jung being underage at the time.

2PM released a teaser for "Hands Up" on their YouTube channel on June 15, 2011. On June 20, both the music video for "Hands Up" and their second studio album Hands Up were released. A Japanese version of the song was included in the group's first Japanese studio album, Republic of 2PM, released on November 30, 2011.

== Music video ==
The music video of "Hands Up" was filmed in Singapore and features landmarks such as Marina Bay and the Singapore Flyer. In the beginning of the music video, each member has an individual scene engaging in various luxurious activities, such as golfing, relaxing at a resort, or drinking champagne on a private aircraft. The members then gather at a crowded nightclub, where they dance and drink alcohol. The song's choreography includes jumping up and down with hands raised in the air, with the concept of playing around in a club.

On July 15, 2011, 2PM released a music video for the remix version of "Hands Up" by South Korean DJ East4A, which was originally included in their studio album Hands Up. The music video, also filmed in Singapore, includes different scenes set on a yacht, at a nightclub, and on a ferris wheel. The end of the video also contains bloopers and behind-the-scenes footage of the making of both music videos and the teaser video for "Hands Up".

== Promotion ==
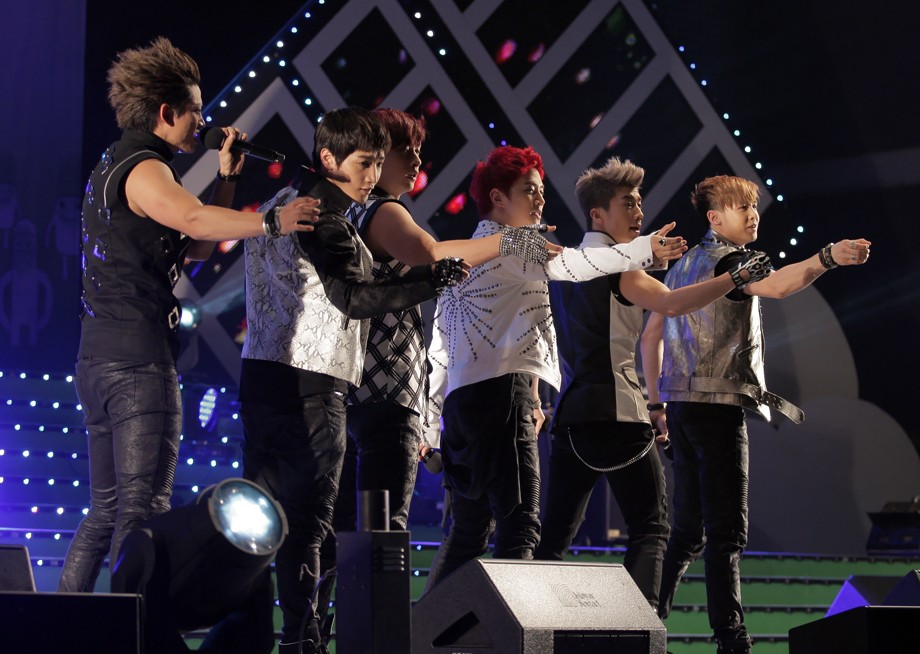
2PM performing "Hands Up" in July 2011.

2PM first performed "Hands Up" on the June 24, 2011 episode of Music Bank, before performing on other Korean television music programs such as M Countdown, Show! Music Core, and Inkigayo. After one month, they ended promotions for Hands Up in late July to focus on advertising promotions in Thailand, the release of their first Japanese studio album Republic of 2PM, and their Hands Up Asia Tour starting in September, the group's first concert tour spanning multiple countries.

As one of 2PM's most recognized songs, "Hands Up" has frequently been performed by the group and their labelmates in various events and concerts throughout their career, such as the MBC Gayo Daejejeon, the SBS Gayo Daejeon, KCON, and JYP Nation concerts. The song has also been covered by other K-pop groups, such as Sistar.

== Reception ==
"Hands Up" quickly topped various domestic music charts such as Melon and saw popularity in other Asian regions, which can be attributed to its "catchy chorus" and "energetic" performances. The song charted on the Gaon Digital Chart for twelve consecutive weeks, debuting at number 1, and also debuted at number 26 on the first issue of Billboard's K-pop Hot 100 several weeks later.

The music video, which saw 2.4 million views within 10 days, resulted in 2PM's appearance at number 35 on Billboard's Social 50 Chart, the first documented appearance of a K-pop act on this chart. Rolling Stone, who ranked the song number 44 on their list of "The 100 Greatest Songs in the History of Korean Pop Music", described the song as a "celebratory" and "classic party song" which embodied the "hedonistic energy of the era".

== Ministry of Gender Equality and Family designation ==
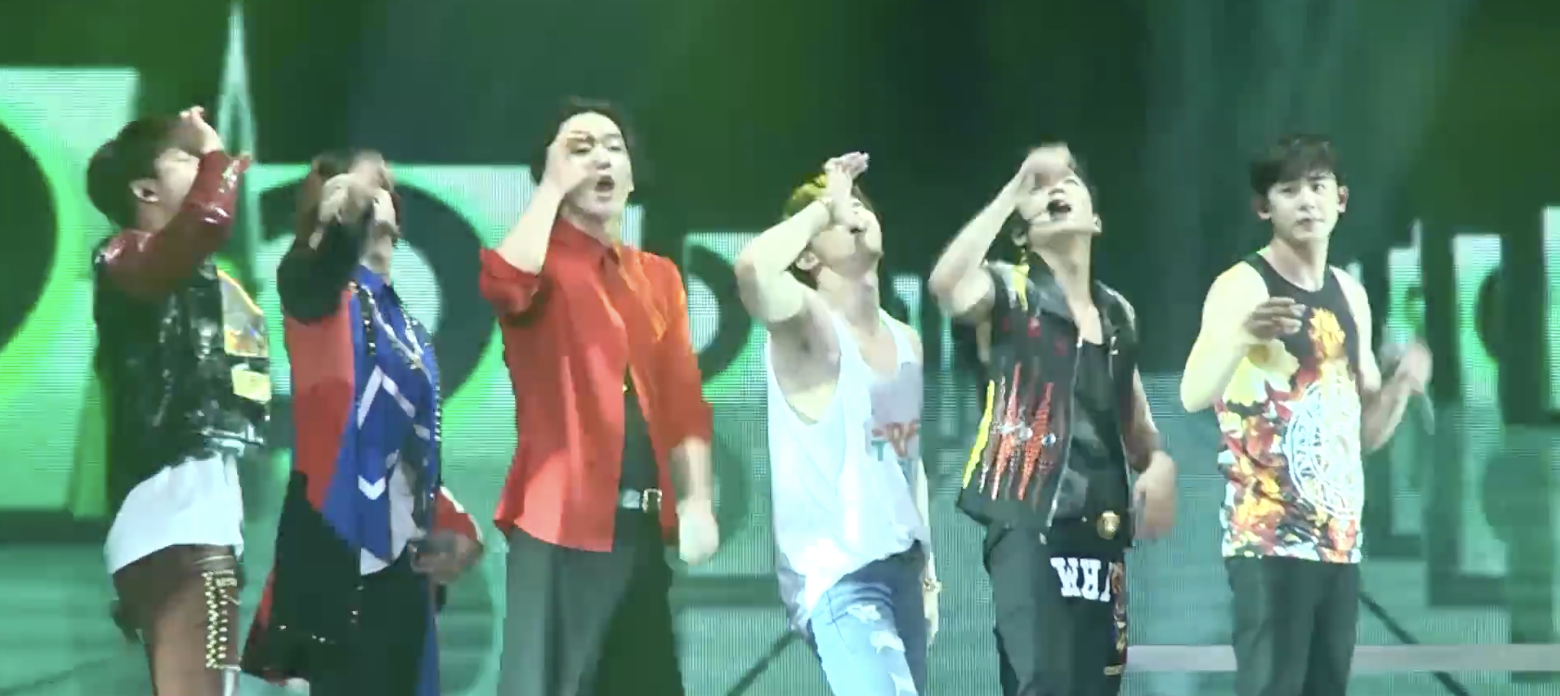
2PM performing "Hands Up" in March 2016. The song was designated as "harmful to youth" due to its references to alcohol.

On August 16, 2011, the South Korean Ministry of Gender Equality and Family (MOGEF) announced that, along with other recent popular songs such as Beast's "On Rainy Days", Homme's "I Was Able to Eat Well", and 10cm's "Americano", "Hands Up" would be rated as "19+" and "harmful to youth" due to lyrics that "glorified" alcohol abuse. These songs were prohibited from being broadcast during certain hours of the day, and purchasing these songs would require age verification. The announcement was controversial with Korean netizens, who flooded the MOGEF's phone lines and caused the MOGEF's website to crash on August 25 due to complaints over the perceived inefficacy towards "protecting youth" and outdated or overly sensitive standards of the MOGEF. Music experts and musicians also criticized the MOGEF for their "ambiguity" and "arbitrary" selection criteria, with some record labels even filing lawsuits against the MOGEF for censorship and lack of objectivity. The designation of "Hands Up" as 19+ resulted in particular backlash, which eventually resulted in the MOGEF enacting a set of "Enforcement Rules" to show objectivity. In October 2012, the MOGEF chose to overturn their 19+ rating for about 300 songs, including "Hands Up"; the decision may be attributed to the global success of the song "Gangnam Style" by Psy, who previously had songs rated 19+ by the MOGEF.

== Accolades ==
Awards and nominations for "Hands Up"
Year	Organization	Award	Result	Ref.
2011	Golden Disc Awards	Digital Bonsang Award	Nominated	
2011	Melon Music Awards	Best Music Video	Nominated	
2011	Melon Music Awards	Netizen Popularity Award	Nominated	

Music program awards
Program	Date	Ref.
M Countdown	July 7, 2011	(Note: Broadcast was cancelled due to the 2011 Mnet 20's Choice Awards.)
Music Bank	July 1, 2011	
Music Bank	July 8, 2011	
Music Bank	July 15, 2011	
Music Bank	July 22, 2011	
Inkigayo	July 3, 2011	
Inkigayo	July 10, 2011	

"Hands Up" on critic lists
Publisher	List	Rank	Ref.
Rolling Stone	The 100 Greatest Songs in the History of Korean Pop Music	44	

== Charts ==
=== Weekly charts ===
Chart (2011)	Peak position
South Korea (Gaon)	1
South Korea (K-pop Hot 100)	26
US World Digital Songs (Billboard)	3

=== Monthly charts ===
Chart (June 2011)	Peak position
South Korea (Gaon)	6

=== Year-end charts ===
Chart (2011)	Peak position
South Korea (Gaon)	24

== Sales ==
Country	Sales
South Korea (digital)	2,837,018

== Release history ==
Country	Date	Format	Label
South Korea	June 20, 2011	Digital download	JYP Entertainment
