= 01:59PM =

Studio album by 2PM
- Released: November 10, 2009
- Recorded: 2008–09
- Genres: K-pop; dance; ballad
- Length: 46:21
- Labels: JYP; LOEN
- Producer: The Asiansoul

2PM chronology
2PM Thailand Special Edition (2009)	01:59PM (2009)	Don't Stop Can't Stop (2010)

Singles from 01:59PM
- 1. "10 Out of 10" Released: August 29, 2008; 2. "Again & Again" Released: April 16, 2009; 3. "Tired of Waiting" Released: November 3, 2009; 4. "I Was Crazy About You" Released: November 6, 2009; 5. "Heartbeat" Released: November 10, 2009; 6. "Thank You" Released: August 17, 2010

01:59PM is the first studio album by South Korean boy band, 2PM. The album was released digitally on November 10, 2009 and as a CD on November 12, 2009, via JYP Entertainment. This would be 2PM's only studio album featuring former member Jaebeom's vocals, although his face was excluded from the cover following his departure from the band.

== Background ==
Prior to the release of 01:59PM, 2PM had withdrawn from appearances on television shows for several weeks due to the controversy surrounding the group's leader Jaebeom and his subsequent departure from the group.

On October 31, 2009, a clock appeared on 2PM's official website, counting down from 70:40. While netizens predicted that it would reach zero at 4:30PM on November 2, the clock instead froze when it reached 1:59; at that time, the teaser for "Tired of Waiting" (기다리다 지친다) was released. Another countdown began for the full song, which was released with the album cover on November 3 at 12:00 AM, when the clock again stopped at 1:59. A teaser for the next track, "I Was Crazy About You" (너에게 미쳤었다), appeared on November 5 with the same procedure, and the full song was released on November 6. On November 7, six teaser videos for the title track "Heartbeat", each featuring one of the band members, were released on YouTube.

Following the release of the rest of the album on November 10, netizens commented on the storytelling of the album, as the lyrics of the two promoted singles, "Tired of Waiting" and "Heartbeat", in particular seemed to describe the group's loss of former member Jaebeom. The album comprises eight new tracks and five tracks from the group's previous single albums, Hottest Time of the Day and 2:00PM Time for Change.

01:59PM was later released in Japan on December 8, 2010, which was promoted with 2PM's debut live performances in the country on the same day, titled 2PM 1st Contact in Japan.

== Track listing ==
Korean editions
No.	Title	Writer(s)	Arrangements	Length
1.	"My Heart"	Jo Joong-su (Fame-J)	Fame-J	1:03
2.	"Heartbeat"	J.Y. Park (The Asiansoul)	The Asiansoul; Rainstone	3:15
3.	"Tired of Waiting" (기다리다 지친다)	Kim Chang-dae (Super Changddai)	Super Changddai	3:27
4.	"I Was Crazy About You" (너에게 미쳤었다)	Kim Eun-su; Jo Joong-su (rap)	Fame-J	3:37
5.	"Gimme the Light"	Jo Joong-su	Fame-J	4:37
6.	"Back 2U"	Shim Eun-ji; Tommy Park	Tommy Park	3:29
7.	"All Night Long"	Hong Ji-sang	Hong Ji-sang	3:53
8.	"Heartbeat" (Red Light mix)	J.Y. Park	J.Y. Park	3:14
9.	"10 Out of 10" (10점 만점에 10점; 10 jeom manjeome 10 jeom)	J.Y. Park	The Asiansoul; Rainstone	3:25
10.	"Only You" (acoustic mix)	J.Y. Park	J.Y. Park	4:40
11.	"Again & Again"	J.Y. Park	The Asiansoul; Heung	4:08
12.	"I Hate You" (니가 밉다; Niga mipda) (lounge mix)	Kim Chang-dae	Super Changddai	3:24
13.	"Maybe She'll Come Back" (돌아올지도 몰라) (Bossa Nova mix)	Jo Joong-su	Fame-J	4:09
Total length:				46:21

Japan special edition
No.	Title	Length
14.	"Thank You"	3:57
Total length:		49:50

Japan special edition – DVD
No.	Title	Length
1.	"2010.09.04~05 2PM 1st Concert Digest Video"
2.	"Thank You" (music video)

== Charts ==
Upon release, both the album and its title track, "Heartbeat", quickly rose to the number one position on multiple domestic music charts. Despite the Gaon Album Chart launching months after the album's release, the album still topped the chart for its first three weeks.

Chart (2010)	Peak position
South Korea Gaon Weekly Albums	1
South Korea Gaon Yearly Albums	31
Japan Oricon Weekly Albums	16

== Release history ==
Country	Release date	Format	Label	Ref.
South Korea	November 10, 2009	Digital download	JYP Entertainment	
South Korea	November 12, 2009	CD	JYP Entertainment	
Japan	December 8, 2010	CD, CD + DVD	Ariola Japan	
Thailand	December 14, 2010	CD + DVD	Sony Music Thailand	
