= Heartbeat (2PM song) =

2009 single by 2PM

Single by 2PM

from the album 01:59PM
- Released: November 10, 2009
- Recorded: 2009
- Genre: K-pop
- Length: 3:15
- Label: JYP
- Songwriter: Park Jin-young
- Producer: Park Jin-young

2PM singles chronology
"Again & Again" (2009)	"Heartbeat" (2009)	"Without U" (2010)

Music video
- "Heartbeat" on YouTube

"Heartbeat" is a song by South Korean boy band 2PM. It was released on November 10, 2009 via JYP Entertainment as the lead single for 01:59PM, the group's first studio album and first release since the departure of the group's leader Jaebeom. "Heartbeat" is often considered 2PM's signature song within South Korea due to the popularity of the group's performances, which were often parodied on television.

== Background ==
"Heartbeat" is an experimental song composed and written by Park Jin-young. The song utilizes stringed instrumentation and a pulsing electronic drumbeat that emulates the sound of a heartbeat. The lyrics of the song center around the experience of heartbreak.

Prior to the release of "Heartbeat", 2PM had withdrawn from appearances on television shows for several weeks due to the controversy surrounding the group's leader Jaebeom and his subsequent departure. Starting from November 6, 2009, six teaser videos, each featuring one of the band members, were released on YouTube in the days leading up to the album's release. The videos featured various close-up shots of the band members hooked up to medical equipment and speaking, before panning to a heartbeat monitor, playing a short clip of the song, and displaying the text "What is your Heartbeating for?" Taecyeon's teaser video mentioned the inclusion of seven members in the band, the seventh member referring to Jaebeom.

== Music video ==
The song's music video was directed by Jang Jae-hyuk and released on November 11, 2009, the day after the song's release. The music video features the members acting as zombies, styled identically in dark makeup and black-and-white outfits. It is 2PM's first music video to exclude Jaebeom, who left the group a few months before the video's release.

The video begins with reversed sequences of the members falling in sand accompanied by stringed instruments, before transitioning to a sequence of close-up shots of the members expressing anguish accompanied by the sounds of a heart rate monitor eventually flatlining. The rest of the music video showcases the choreography of the song, set in either a dark, sandy set with minimal beams of light to accentuate the members' shadows or a well-lit room with curved white walls. At the end of the music video, the members all lie on the ground, with their souls leaving their bodies.

== Reception and legacy ==
"Heartbeat" initially saw mixed reception due to its experimental sound and "zombie" concept, with responses ranging from "novel" and "refreshing" to "strange" and "difficult to understand". Furthermore, netizens commented on how the storytelling of the song, along with the entire album 01:59PM, seemed to be a metaphor for the group without former member Jaebeom.

However, the song quickly grew popular due to its choreography featuring multiple "point dances" and physical stunts that have often been covered by other groups or parodied on TV music programs and variety shows such as Family Outing and Running Man. Examples include the opening sequence of Taecyeon pantomiming a pulsating heart in his hand, only to have his head pushed away by Chansung; the point dance of emphasizing a heartbeat with a hand to the chest; and the human pyramid formation at the end of the song. "Heartbeat" was also known for having different choreographed endings focused on a different member each performance, such as 2PM's hallmark acrobatic flips or ripping shirts open. The latter was an uncommon practice for K-pop idols at the time and solidified 2PM's image of masculinity and sex appeal, with media outlets giving the group the moniker "beast idols" (Korean: 짐승돌; RR: jimseungdol).

"Heartbeat" is often considered 2PM's signature song for its impact in South Korean pop culture. In 2010, the song won a Bonsang Award at the Cyworld Digital Music Awards. In 2016, "Heartbeat" was voted as the eleventh best male idol song in the past 20 years in a poll involving 2,000 people by South Korean magazine Dong-a Ilbo, web magazine Idology, and research company M Brain. In 2021, Melon and Seoul Shinmun placed "Heartbeat" at number 35 on their list of the top 100 K-pop songs of all time as determined by thirty-five music critics and industry experts. MBC Radio director Son Han-seo praised the song for being able to invoke "intense emotions akin to watching a heart-wrenching movie", as well as the theatricality of the group's performances of the song.

"Heartbeat" on select critic lists
Publication	Year	List	Rank	Ref.
The Dong-a Ilbo	2016	Top Male Idol Songs of the Past 20 Years	11	
Melon	2021	Top 100 K-pop Songs of All Time	24	

== Japanese version ==
2PM performed the Korean version of "Heartbeat" when making their first appearances on Japanese television: Fuji TV's morning news program Tokudane! on December 9, 2010 and NHK's music program Music Japan on December 19, 2010, the latter being the first instance of an act performing a song in the Korean language on Music Japan.

A Japanese version of "Heartbeat" was first performed live at the Mezamashi Super Live in Okinawa on February 26, 2011. A ringtone version of the track was released on April 25, 2011, the same day the song received its first broadcast television performance on Fuji TV's Hey! Hey! Hey! Music Champ. The song was then included as the B-side track for 2PM's debut Japanese single "Take Off", released on May 18, 2011. The track was also included in 2PM's first Japanese studio album, Republic of 2PM, released on November 30, 2011.

== Charts ==
Despite the Gaon Digital Chart launching in 2010, months after the release of "Heartbeat," the song charted at number 14 in its very first issue and remained on the chart for 11 cumulative weeks. "Heartbeat" also topped other domestic charts including the Melon Chart and charted at number 58 in the 2009 Melon Year-End Chart.

Chart performance for "Heartbeat"
Chart (2010)	Peak position
South Korea Weekly Singles (Gaon)	14

== Accolades ==
Awards and nominations for "Heartbeat"
Year	Organization	Award	Result	Ref.
2009	Cyworld Digital Music Awards	Bonsang Award	Won	
2010	Melon Music Awards	Netizen Popularity Award	Nominated	

Music program awards
Program	Date	Ref.
Music Bank	November 27, 2009	
Music Bank	December 4, 2009	
Music Bank	December 11, 2009	
Music Bank	December 18, 2009	
Inkigayo	November 29, 2009	
Inkigayo	December 6, 2009	
Inkigayo	December 13, 2009	
