= Still 02:00PM =

EP by 2PM
- Released: October 11, 2010
- Recorded: 2010
- Genres: K-pop; Dance-pop; hip-hop; R&B
- Length: 22:05
- Labels: JYP; LOEN
- Producer: The Asiansoul

2PM chronology
2PM 2nd Special Edition (2010)	Still 02:00PM (2010)	All About 2PM (2011)

Singles from Still 2:00PM
- 1. "I'll Be Back" Released: October 11, 2010

Still 02:00PM is the first extended play by South Korean boy band 2PM. The album was released digitally on October 11, 2010 and as a CD on October 14, 2010 via JYP Entertainment. The album reached number 1 on the Gaon Album Chart. All the tracks on Still 02:00PM, also charted on the Gaon Singles Chart. On November 1, 2010, Still 02:00PM debuted unexpectedly on the 13th spot of the Billboard World Albums Chart, although no specific promotions for the album were made in the US. The songs "I'll Be Back" and "I Can't" were later added on the group's second studio album, Hands Up (2011).

Professional ratings
Review scores
Source	Rating
The Korea Times	favorable

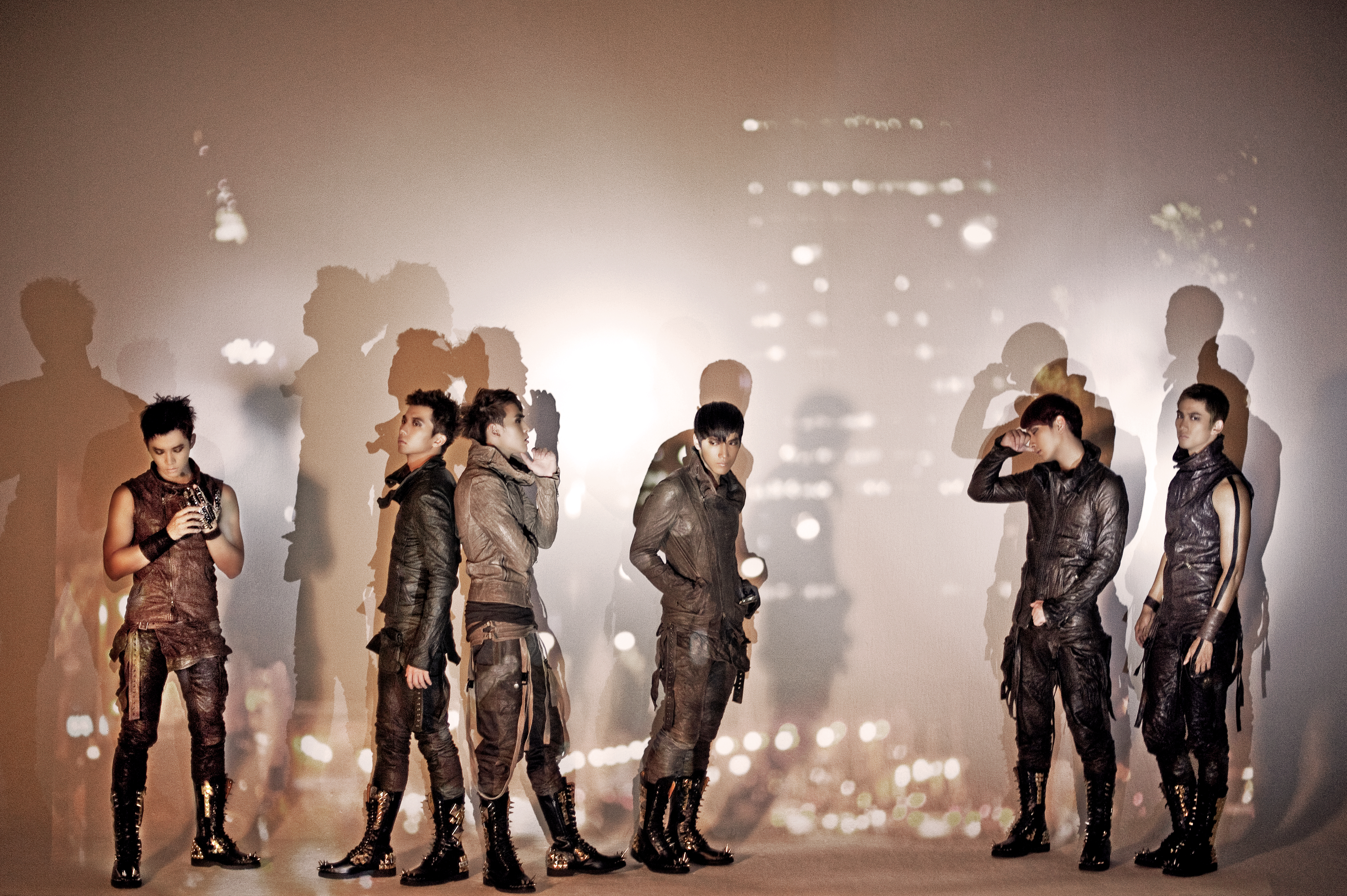
A teaser photoshoot of 2PM for Still 02:00PM.

== Track listing ==
All editions track listing
No.	Title	Lyrics	Music	Mixer	Length
1.	"Still"	Park Jin-young	Park Jin-young; Shin So-yeon	The Asiansoul; So-yeon	1:05
2.	"I'll Be Back"	Park Jin-young	Park Jin-young	The Asiansoul; Fame-J; Shim Eun-ji	3:37
3.	"Even If You Leave Me" (Korean: 니가 나를 떠나도; RR: Niga nareul tteonado)	Kim Chang-dae	Chang-dae	Chang dda-ee	3:26
4.	"I Can't"	Lee Doo-hyun	Lee Doo-hyun	Ra.D	3:25
5.	"I Know"	Joong-su	Joong-su	Fame-J	3:29
6.	"Dance2Night"	Bang Yu-hyeon; Park Se-jin	Bang Yu-hyeon; Park Se-jin	Bang Yu-hyeon; Park Se-jin	3:03
7.	"I'll Be Back" (club mix)	Park Jin-young	Park Jin-young; Tommy Park; Brian Stanley; Choi Joong-Bae	Stanley; Tommy Park; JB	4:00
Total length:					22:05

== Charts ==
Chart	Peak position	Ref.
South Korea Gaon Weekly Albums	1	
South Korea Gaon Monthly Albums	4	
South Korea Gaon Yearly Albums	14	
United States Billboard World Albums	13	

=== Sales ===
Chart	Amount
Gaon physical sales	90,442

== Release history ==
Region	Date	Format	Label	Ref.
South Korea	October 11, 2010	Digital download	JYP Entertainment	
South Korea	October 14, 2010	CD	JYP Entertainment	
Japan	October 15, 2010	CD	Jakorea	
Taiwan	November 3, 2010	CD + DVD	Universal Music Taiwan	
Thailand	November 19, 2010	CD	Sony Music Thailand	
