= I'll Be Back (2PM song) =

Single by 2PM

from the EP Still 02:00PM
- Released: October 11, 2010
- Recorded: 2010
- Genre: K-pop; Dance-pop; House music
- Length: 3:34
- Label: JYP
- Songwriter: Park Jin-young
- Producer: Park Jin-young

2PM singles chronology
"Thank You" (2010)	"I'll Be Back" (2010)	"Take Off" (2011)

Music video
- "I'll Be Back" on YouTube

"I'll Be Back" is a song recorded by South Korean boy band 2PM. It was released on October 11, 2010 via JYP Entertainment as the lead single for Still 02:00PM, the group's first EP. The song has won 2PM several accolades, including the 2010 MAMA Award for Best Male Group and the 2010 MAMA Award for Best Dance Performance.

== Background ==
"I'll Be Back" is a house song composed and written by Park Jin-young. The song runs 3 minutes and 34 seconds in length. The lyrics of the song are from the perspective of a man in denial over a breakup, claiming his ex-partner will return to him.

On October 9, 2010, a teaser for the music video of "I'll Be Back" was released on 2PM's official website and YouTube channel. On October 11, the music video for "I'll Be Back" was released.

The track would later be included in 2PM's second studio album, Hands Up, released on June 20, 2011. A Japanese version of the song was included as the B-side track of 2PM's third Japanese single, "Ultra Lover", released on November 2, 2011.

== Music video ==
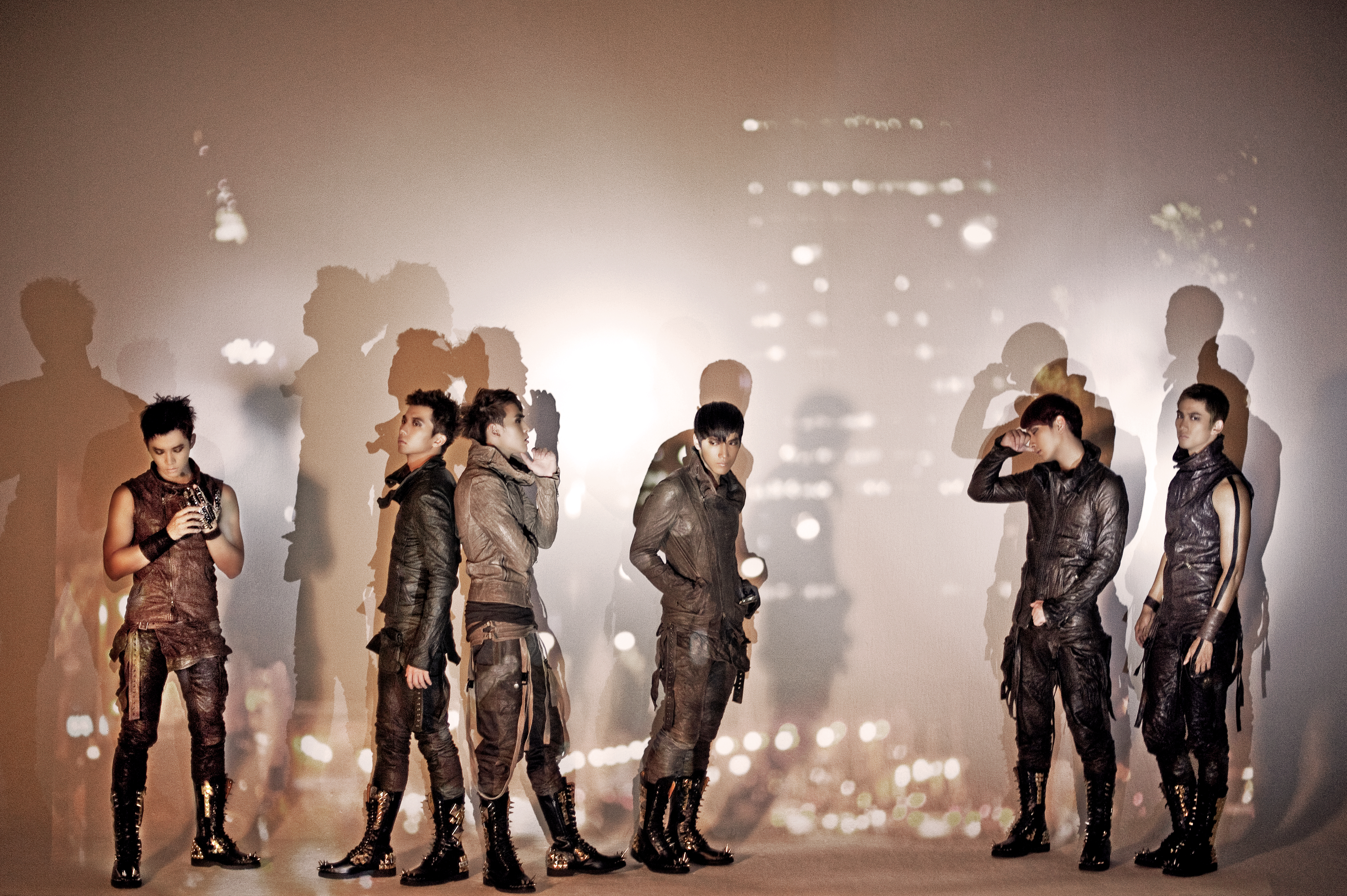
A teaser photoshoot of 2PM for Still 02:00PM.

The music video is heavily inspired by the Terminator series of films, as the title of the song is the same as the films' famous catchphrase "I'll be back", and the choreography of the song begins with member Jun. K recreating the T-800 Terminator's death scene in Terminator 2: Judgment Day by raising a thumbs-up above his head while singing the catchphrase.

The music video features the members dressed in metallic eye shadow and leather post-apocalyptic fashion, dancing in brightly lit rooms. The choreography of the song heavily focuses on a type of shuffle dance called the running man, and the ending of the music video includes a dance break sequence which incorporates acrobatic flips and breakdancing, hallmarks of 2PM's early signature style, to the beat of mechanical sound effects.

== Charts ==
=== Weekly charts ===
Chart (2010)	Peak position	Ref.
South Korea (Gaon Singles Chart)	4	

=== Monthly charts ===
Chart (October 2010)	Peak position	Ref.
South Korea (Gaon Singles Chart)	11	

=== Year-end charts ===
Chart (2010)	Peak position	Ref.
South Korea (Gaon Singles Chart)	83	

== Accolades ==
Awards and nominations for "I'll Be Back"
Year	Organization	Award	Result	Ref.
2010	Golden Disc Awards	Digital Bonsang Award	Nominated	
2010	Mnet Asian Music Awards	Song of the Year	Nominated	
2010	Mnet Asian Music Awards	Best Male Group	Won	
2010	Mnet Asian Music Awards	Best Dance Performance	Won	

Music show wins
Program	Date	Ref.
M Countdown	October 28, 2010	
M Countdown	November 4, 2010	
Music Bank	October 22, 2010	
Music Bank	October 29, 2010	
Inkigayo	October 24, 2010	
