= List of songs recorded by 2PM =

South Korean boy band 2PM has recorded over 200 songs for twelve studio albums and two extended plays (EP). The group debuted with their 2008 single "10 Out of 10" from their single album Hottest Time of the Day. The group later debuted in Japan with their 2011 single "Take Off"; since then, the group has released both Korean-language and Japanese-language versions for select songs.

The group's second studio album, Hands Up (2011), was their first music release to include songs written by the group's members. 2PM would gradually increase the amount of songs written or composed by the group in subsequent albums, with their 2014 single "Go Crazy!" being their first single to be written by a group member. Furthermore, the group's musical identity would firmly solidify in the R&B genre, often combined with electronic influences. Each 2PM member has also released at least one solo studio album or EP in South Korea and/or Japan.

2PM has achieved two number-one and four other top-ten songs on the South Korean Gaon Digital Chart and two number-one songs and ten other top-ten songs on the Japanese Oricon Singles Chart. The group has also recorded one Mandarin Chinese-language song in 2013, "Shining in the Night".

== Songs ==
Key
†	Indicates single release
#	Indicates song without official release

Name of song, featured performers, writers, originating album, and year released
Song	Writer(s)	Originating album or single	Year	Ref.
"10 Out of 10" †	J.Y. Park	Hottest Time of the Day	2008	
"10 Out of 10" (Old School Version)	J.Y. Park	Hottest Time of the Day	2008	
"10 Out of 10" (re-recorded ver.)	J.Y. Park	2PM Member's Selection	2012	
"100th Day Anniversary"	Hong Ji-sang; Tommy Park; Nice73; H.U.B.	Republic of 2PM	2011	
"365"	Junho; Hong Ji-sang; Yu Shimoji; Shin Bong-won	Guilty Love	2015	
"365" (Starlight Version)	Junho; Hong Ji-sang; Yu Shimoji; Shin Bong-won	Guilty Love (LP-size Limited Edition)	2015	
"50 50" (Jun. K Rap ver.) Jun. K and Taecyeon	Jun. K Boytoy; Michael Yano	Galaxy of 2PM (Jun. K x Taecyeon Edition)	2016	
"50 50" (Taecyeon Rap ver.) Jun. K and Taecyeon	Jun. K Boytoy; Michael Yano; Taecyeon (Note: Rap lyrics only)	Galaxy of 2PM (Jun. K x Taecyeon Edition)	2016	
"A.D.T.O.Y." †	J.Y. Park; Taecyeon	Grown	2013	
"About to Go Insane"	Taecyeon; Raphael	No.5	2015	
"Again & Again" †	J.Y. Park	2:00PM Time for Change	2009	
"Again & Again" (R&B mix)	J.Y. Park	2:00PM Time for Change	2009	
"Again & Again" (re-recorded ver.)	J.Y. Park	2PM Member's Selection	2012	
"All Night Long"	Hong Ji-sang	01:59PM	2009	
"All Night Long" (Korean: 시도때도없이; RR: Sidottaedoeopsi)	Kim Won	Gentlemen's Game	2016	
"Alive" Jun. K solo	Jun. K Chance	Non-album single	2011	
"Angel"	Kwon Tae-eun; Park Jang-geun	Hottest Time of the Day	2008	
"Angel" (JYP Nation in Japan 2011 ver.) (Note: Live version) with 2AM, as One Day	Kwon Tae-eun; Park Jang-geun	One Day (Regular Edition)	2012	
"At Times" (Note: Korean version of "Hanarete Itemo")	Jun. K	Grown	2013	
"Awesome!"	Laybacksound; Taecyeon	Go Crazy!	2014	
"Back 2U"	Tommy Park; Sim Eunjee	01:59PM	2009	
"Beat of Love"	Yosuke Ninbari; Michael Yano; Kenn Kato	Genesis of 2PM	2014	
"Beautiful" †	J.Y. Park; Natsumi Watanabe; Nice73	Beautiful	2012	
"Beautiful" (Aqua Blu mix)	J.Y. Park; Natsumi Watanabe; Nice73	Beautiful (Regular Edition)	2012	
"Beautiful" (Kor Ver.)	J.Y. Park	Go Crazy!	2014	
"Beautiful Day"	Collapsedone; Kenn Kato; Michael Yano	Genesis of 2PM	2014	
"The Blue Light" Wooyoung solo	Wooyoung; Boytoy; Kenn Kato	2PM of 2PM (Limited Edition B)	2015	
"Boku Wa" Chansung solo	Chansung; Natsumi Watanabe	2PM of 2PM (Limited Edition B)	2015	
"Boyfriend"	Chansung; Sim Eunjee; Taecyeon	Go Crazy!	2014	
"Breakthrough"	Kazuhiro Hara; Yu Shimoji; Nice73	Legend of 2PM	2013	
"Burning Love"	Junho; Hong Ji-sang; Risa Horie; Michael Yano	2PM of 2PM	2015	
"By My Side"	Albin Nordqvist; Selah; Sunny Boy	With Me Again	2021	
"Cabi Song" with Girls' Generation	Shinsadong Tiger; Choi Kyu-sung	Promotional single for Everland Resort's Caribbean Bay	2010	
"The Cafe"	Wooyoung; Toyo; Sean Michael Alexander; Sqvare	Must	2021	
"Can't Stop Feeling"	Chansung; Lel; Taecyeon	Gentlemen's Game	2016	
"Champagne"	Taecyeon; Raphael	Must	2021	
"Chikai no Christmas"	Junho; Hong Ji-sang; Yu Shimoji	Higher (Limited Edition A)	2016	
"Chocolate" Taecyeon featuring Yerin	Taecyeon; Yerin; Raphael	2PM of 2PM (Limited Edition B)	2015	
"Comeback When You Hear This Song" †	J.Y. Park; Taecyeon	Grown	2013	
"Comeback When You Hear This Song" with JYP Nation	J.Y. Park; Taecyeon	JYP Nation Korea 2014 'One Mic'	2014	
"Comeback When You Hear This Song" (Japanese: この歌を聴いて戻ってきて, Hepburn: Kono uta o kiite modotte kit)	J.Y. Park; Natsumi Watanabe; Michael Yano; Taecyeon	Winter Games (Limited Edition B)	2013	
"Coming Down"	East4A; Chansung; Taecyeon	Grown	2013	
"Crazy 4S"	Super Changddai	Promotional single for SPRIS	2010	
"Crazy in Love"	J.Y. Park; Yosuke Ninbari; Emi K. Lynn; Nice73	Republic of 2PM	2011	
"Crush" Junho solo	Junho; Hong Ji-sang; Mayumi Kon	2PM of 2PM (Limited Edition B)	2015	
"Dance2Night"	Bang Yu-hyeon; Park Se-jin	Still 02:00PM	2010	
"Dangerous"	Ryan IM	Grown	2013	
"Don't Forget"	Taecyeon; Raphael; Risa Horie	Galaxy of 2PM	2016	
"Don't Leave Me" (Note: Song originally by J.Y. Park) with JYP Nation	J.Y. Park; Seo Yoon-jeong	JYP Nation Korea 2014 'One Mic'	2014	
"Don't Stop Can't Stop"	J.Y. Park	Don't Stop Can't Stop	2010	
"Don't You Know"	Hong Ji-sang	Hands Up	2011	
"Eien ~Lasting Heart~"	Hong Ji-sang; Yu Shimoji; Michael Yano	Genesis of 2PM	2014	
"Electricity"	J.Y. Park	Hands Up	2011	
"Electricity" (220v mix)	J.Y. Park	Hands Up	2011	
"Encore" Nichkhun and Junho, with JYP Nation	J.Y. Park; Yubin; Hyerim; Mark Tuan; Yugyeom; Jackson Wang	Non-album single	2016	
"Even If You Leave Me"	Super Changddai	Still 02:00PM	2010	
"Everest" Jun. K solo	Jun. K Lel; Boytoy; Simon	Higher (Jun. K Version)	2016	
"Everybody"	Junho; Noboru Abe; Masanori Morita; Yu Shimoji	2PM of 2PM	2015	
"Falling in Love"	Jun. K Michael Yano; Faya	Give Me Love	2013	
"Fight"	Taecyeon; Raphael; Joohyo; Garfunkel; Risa Horie	Midaretemina	2014	
"The First Date"	Yeom Dong-geon; RT-T; 17Holic	Grown	2013	
"Fly To Seoul (Boom Boom Boom)" Jun. K, Taecyeon, Wooyoung, Junho, and Chansung	Super Changddai	Promotional single for Seoul Tourism "Infinitely Yours, Seoul" campaign	2010	
"Follow Your Soul"		Promotional single for OPPO Thailand	2010	
"Forever"	Junho; Hong Ji-sang; Shin Bong-won; Mai Watarai	Masquerade	2012	
"Freeze"	Ragoon IM; Teria IM; Yhanael	Galaxy of 2PM	2016	
"The Galaxy"	Collapsedone	Galaxy of 2PM	2016	
"Game Over"	Jun. K Chance	Grown	2013	
"Genesis"	Collapsedone	Genesis of 2PM	2014	
"Gimme the Light"	Fame-J	01:59PM	2009	
"Giv U Class."	Wooyoung; Super Kiro	Gentlemen's Game	2016	
"Give It To Me"	Junho; Hong Ji-sang	Hands Up	2011	
"Give Me Love" †	Yosuke Ninbari; Michael Yano; Natsumi Watanabe	Give Me Love	2013	
"Give Me Love" (ArmySlick's bavtronic mix)	Yosuke Ninbari; Michael Yano; Natsumi Watanabe	Give Me Love (Regular Edition)	2013	
"Give Up" Wooyoung solo	Wooyoung; Ryan IM; Vincenzo; Emyli	Genesis of 2PM (Limited Edition B)	2014	
"Go Back"	Junho; Hong Ji-sang; Taecyeon	Grown	2013	
"Go Crazy!" †	Jun. K Danny Majic; Dustin Tavella; DJ Nure; Fingazz	Go Crazy!	2014	
"Go Crazy!" (Boytoy Crazy Remix)	Jun. K Danny Majic; Dustin Tavella; DJ Nure; Fingazz	Go Crazy! (Grand Edition)	2014	
"Go Crazy!" (Boytoy Vibe Remix)	Jun. K Danny Majic; Dustin Tavella; DJ Nure; Fingazz	Go Crazy! (Grand Edition)	2014	
"Go Crazy!" (Djnure vs. Fingazz Remix)	Jun. K Danny Majic; Dustin Tavella; DJ Nure; Fingazz	Go Crazy! (Grand Edition)	2014	
"Good Man"	Chansung; Ryan IM; Taecyeon	No.5	2015	
"Goodbye Trip"	Jun. K Lel	Go Crazy!	2014	
"Guilty Love" †	Masaki Iehara; Jam9; Risa Horie; Yuhki Shirai; Michael Yano	Guilty Love	2015	
"Guilty Love" (Collapsedone remix)	Masaki Iehara; Jam9; Risa Horie; Yuhki Shirai; Michael Yano	Guilty Love (LP-size Limited Edition)	2015	
"Hallucination"	e.one Taecyeon	No.5	2015	
"Hanarete Itemo"	Jun. K Kenn Kato	Republic of 2PM	2011	
"Hanarete Itemo" (Live ver.)	Jun. K Kenn Kato	Legend of 2PM (Regular Edition)	2013	
"Hands Up" †	J.Y. Park	Hands Up	2011	
"Hands Up" (Clean Ver.)	J.Y. Park	Hands Up	2011	
"Hands Up" (East4A mix)	J.Y. Park	Hands Up	2011	
"Hands Up" (Japanese ver.)	J.Y. Park; Nice73; Pa-non	Republic of 2PM	2011	
"Hanpa Nai" Wooyoung solo	Wooyoung; Super Kiro; Yu Shimoji	Higher (Wooyoung Version)	2016	
"Heartbeat" †	J.Y. Park	01:59PM	2009	
"Heartbeat" (Japanese ver.)	J.Y. Park; Shoko Fujibayashi; Yu Shimoji; Komu	Take Off	2011	
"Heartbeat" (Red Light Mix)	J.Y. Park	01:59PM	2009	
"Hey You" Junho solo	Junho; Hong Ji-sang; Collapsedone; Yu Shimoji	Genesis of 2PM (Limited Edition B)	2014	
"Higher" †	Jun. K Lel; Morizuki Kyasu; Simon	Higher	2016	
"Hold You"	Jun. K	Must	2021	
"Hot"	Jun. K	Hands Up	2011	
"Hotter than July"	Chansung; 220; Brian Cho; Andrew Choi; Chris Hope; J Faith; Taecyeon	No.5	2015	
"Humming"	Wooyoung; Lel; Rap Wizil	Gentlemen's Game	2016	
"I Can't"	Ra.D	Still 02:00PM	2010	
"I Hate You"	Super Changddai	2:00PM Time for Change	2009	
"I Hate You" (Lounge Mix)	Super Changddai	01:59PM	2009	
"I Hate You" (re-recorded ver.)	Super Changddai	2PM Member's Selection	2012	
"I Know"	Fame-J	Still 02:00PM	2010	
"I Know"	Kenji Kabashima; Takashige Tsukada; Yu Shimoji	2PM of 2PM (Repackage)	2015	
"I Want You"	Junho; Hong Ji-sang; Risa Horie; Michael Yano	Genesis of 2PM	2014	
"I Was Crazy About You"	Fame-J; Jennifer Eunsoo Kim	01:59PM	2009	
"I Will Give You My Life"	Super Changddai	Don't Stop Can't Stop	2010	
"I'll Be Back" †	J.Y. Park	Still 02:00PM	2010	
"I'll Be Back" (Club Mix)	J.Y. Park	Still 02:00PM	2010	
"I'll Be Back" (Japanese ver.)	J.Y. Park; Kenn Kato; Komu	Ultra Lover	2011	
"I'll Be OK"	Tommy Park; Dokebi Punch; Michael Yano; Chokkyu Murano	Legend of 2PM	2013	
"I'm In Love" Junho solo	Junho; Hong Ji-sang; Michael Yano; Yu Shimoji	Grown (Grand Edition)	2013	
"I'm Sorry"	Dokebi Punch; Taecyeon	Grown	2013	
"I'm Your Man" †	J.Y. Park; Super Changddai; Yu Shimoji; JiN	I'm Your Man	2011	
"I'm Your Man" (Kor Ver.)	J.Y. Park; Super Changddai	Go Crazy!	2014	
"Intro"	Jun. K	2PM of 2PM	2015	
"Intro."	HotSauce	Must	2021	
"It's Only You" Taecyeon featuring Yerin	Taecyeon; Michael Yano	Genesis of 2PM (Limited Edition B)	2014	
"It's Time" Taecyeon featuring San E and Yubin	Taecyeon; San E Yubin	Grown (Grand Edition)	2013	
"Jam Session"	Yu-ki Kokubo; Kohei Yokono; Michael Yano	2PM of 2PM	2015	
"Jump"	Taecyeon; Raphael	No.5	2015	
"Just a Feeling" Junho solo	Junho	Grown (Grand Edition)	2013	
"Kanojo" Nichkhun and Wooyoung	Wooyoung; Lel; Kenn Kato	Galaxy of 2PM (Nichkhun x Wooyoung Edition)	2016	
"KBS World Logo" #	Raphael	Promotional single for KBS World 10th Anniversary	2013	
"Kimi ga Ireba"	Junho; Mai Watarai; Nice73	Beautiful	2012	
"Kimidakeni" Taecyeon solo	Taecyeon; Kenn Kato; Garfunkel	Legend of 2PM (Limited Edition B)	2013	
"Know Your Mind"	Ragoon IM; Ban Mi-sun	No.5	2015	
"The Legend"	Tommy Park	Legend of 2PM	2013	
"Let It Rain" Nichkhun solo	Nichkhun; Hong Ji-sang	Legend of 2PM (Limited Edition B)	2013	
"Like a Movie"	Chance	Hands Up	2011	
"Like Tonight"	Playful Children; Shin Man-soo; Taecyeon	Go Crazy!	2014	
"Love is True" Nichkhun and Junho	Nichkhun; Junho; Hong Ji-sang	Go Crazy! (Grand Edition)	2014	
"Love Song"	Junho; Hong Ji-sang	Grown	2013	
"Love U Down" Chansung solo	Tommy Park	Grown (Grand Edition)	2013	
"Magic"	Taecyeon; Raphael	No.5	2015	
"Make It" †	Wooyoung; HotSauce	Must	2021	
"Make It" (Japanese ver.)	Wooyoung; HotSauce	With Me Again	2021	
"Make It" (Japanese ver., HotSauce Remix)	Wooyoung; HotSauce	With Me Again (Limited Edition B)	2021	
"Make Love"	Chansung; Lel; Taecyeon	Gentlemen's Game	2016	
"Masquerade" †	Yosuke Ninbari; Michael Yano; Pa-non	Masquerade	2012	
"Masquerade" (Album ver.)	Yosuke Ninbari; Michael Yano; Pa-non	Legend of 2PM	2013	
"Masquerade" (ArmySlick's bavtronic mix)	Yosuke Ninbari; Michael Yano; Pa-non	Masquerade (Regular Edition)	2012	
"Maybe She'll Come Back"	Fame-J	2:00PM Time for Change	2009	
"Maybe She'll Come Back" (Bossa Nova Mix)	Fame-J	01:59PM	2009	
"Maybe She'll Come Back" (re-recorded ver.)	Fame-J	2PM Member's Selection	2012	
"Maybe You Are" Nichkhun solo	Ryan IM; Lauren Kaori; Natsumi Watanabe	Higher (Nichkhun Version)	2016	
"Mayday"	Chansung; Super Changddai; Shoko Fujibayashi	Promise (I'll Be) -Japanese ver.-	2016	
"Maza"	Super Changddai	Don't Stop Can't Stop	2010	
"Merry-Go-Round"	Wooyoung; Hong Ji-sang; Garfunkel; Natsumi Watanabe	Genesis of 2PM	2014	
"Midaretemina" (Note: Japanese version of "Go Crazy!") †	Jun. K Danny Majic; Dustin Tavella; DJ Nure; Fingazz; Shoko Fujibayashi	Midaretemina	2014	
"Midaretemina" (Boytoy crazy remix)	Jun. K Danny Majic; Dustin Tavella; DJ Nure; Fingazz; Shoko Fujibayashi	Midaretemina (LP-size Limited Edition)	2014	
"Midaretemina" (Boytoy vibe remix)	Jun. K Danny Majic; Dustin Tavella; DJ Nure; Fingazz; Shoko Fujibayashi	Midaretemina (LP-size Limited Edition)	2014	
"Midaretemina" (Djnure vs. Fingazz Remix)	Jun. K Danny Majic; Dustin Tavella; DJ Nure; Fingazz; Shoko Fujibayashi	Midaretemina (LP-size Limited Edition)	2014	
"Milky Way ~Galaxy~"	Wooyoung; Ryan IM; Natsumi Watanabe	Galaxy of 2PM (Repackage)	2016	
"Mine"	Chansung; Lasse Lindorff; Ilanguaq David Lumholt; Mads W. Møller; Thor Nørgaard; Taecyeon	Go Crazy!	2014	
"Miss Wonderful" Nichkhun solo	Sam Gray; Yuka Matsumoto	2PM of 2PM (Limited Edition B)	2015	
"Miss You" Chansung solo	Chansung; Super Changddai; Risa Horie	Higher (Chansung Version)	2016	
"Missing You"	Tommy Park; Michael Yano; Pa-non	Legend of 2PM	2013	
"Moon & Back"	Emily Yeonseo Kim; KT Park; Jinbyjin	Must	2021	
"Move On" Wooyoung and Junho	Junho; Hong Ji-sang	2PM Best ~2008–2011 in Korea~	2012	
"My Color"	J.Y. Park	Promotional single for Samsung Anycall	2009	
"My Heart"	Fame-J	01:59PM	2009	
"My House" †	Jun. K Lel	No.5	2015	
"My House" (Acoustic ver.)	Jun. K Lel	Must	2021	
"My House" (Japanese ver.)	Jun. K Lel; Shoko Fujibayashi	Higher	2016	
"My House" (Japanese ver., Acoustic ver.)	Jun. K Lel; Shoko Fujibayashi	With Me Again (Limited Edition B)	2021	
"My Last"	Lee Joo-hyoung; Nopari; GDLO	Gentlemen's Game	2016	
"Never"	220; Andrew Choi; Secret Weapon; Ju Chan-yang	Gentlemen's Game	2016	
"Never Give Up" Taecyeon solo	Taecyeon; Raphael; Samuelle Soung	Higher (Taecyeon Version)	2016	
"Next Generation"	Kazuhiro Hara; Yu Shimoji; Michael Yano	Genesis of 2PM	2014	
"No Goodbyes" with 2AM, as One Day	Jun. K Emyli	One Day	2012	
"No Goodbyes" (Korean Original Version) with 2AM	Jun. K	JYP Nation Korea 2014 'One Mic'	2014	
"No Goodbyes" (Korean Version) with 2AM	Jun. K	JYP Nation Korea 2014 'One Mic'	2014	
"No Love" Jun. K solo	Jun. K Super Changddai; Kenn Kato	Genesis of 2PM (Limited Edition B)	2014	
"Nobody Else"	Junho; Hong Ji-sang	No.5	2015	
"Nori For U"	Hong Ji-sang	Promotional single for Samsung Anycall	2010	
"Not the Only One"	Jun. K Kim Tae-sung; Ryan Kim; Secret Weapon; Taecyeon	No.5	2015	
"Oh" Chansung solo	Tommy Park; Emyli	Legend of 2PM (Limited Edition B)	2013	
"OK or Not"	Jun. K Lee Hae-sol	Must	2021	
"On My Way"	Jun. K Lee Hae-sol	Must	2021	
"One Day" † with 2AM, as One Day	Super Changddai; Michael Yano; Yu Shimoji; Faya	One Day	2012	
"One More Day"	Sim Eunjee; Taecyeon	Grown	2013	
"Only Girl"	Sim Eun-jee; Shoko Fujibayashi; Michael Yano	Genesis of 2PM	2014	
"Only One"	Hong Ji-sang; Garfunkel; Natsumi Watanabe	Legend of 2PM	2013	
"Only You"	J.Y. Park	01:59PM	2009	
"Only You" (Acoustic Mix)	J.Y. Park	Hottest Time of the Day	2008	
"Only You" (re-recorded ver.)	J.Y. Park	2PM Member's Selection	2012	
"Only You" (Winter Special) †	J.Y. Park	Non-album single	2008	
"Open Happiness"		Promotional single for Coca-Cola	2010	
"Party Monster"	Damon Sharpe; Jimmy Burney; Drew Ryan Scott; Ichiro Suezawa; Yhanael	Galaxy of 2PM	2016	
"Perfume" Chansung solo	Chansung; Ha Jung-ho	Grown (Grand Edition)	2013	
"Perfume" (Japanese: 香水, Hepburn: Kōsui) Chansung solo	Chansung; Ha Jung-ho; Mai Watarai	Genesis of 2PM (Limited Edition B)	2014	
"Perfume" (Korean: 향수; RR: Hyangsu)	e.one Taecyeon	Gentlemen's Game	2016	
"Please Call My Name"	Taecyeon; Ahn Jung-yeon	Grown (Grand Edition)	2013	
"Please Come Back" Taecyeon and Chansung featuring Baek A-yeon	Taecyeon	Go Crazy! (Grand Edition)	2014	
"Promise (I'll Be)" †	Taecyeon; Raphael; Lesley Chiang	Gentlemen's Game	2016	
"Promise (I'll Be)" (Japanese ver.) †	Taecyeon; Raphael; Lesley Chiang	Promise (I'll Be) -Japanese ver.-	2016	
"Pull&Pull"	Ragoon IM; Ryan IM; Taecyeon	Go Crazy!	2014	
"Rain"	Glory Face; Alto; Taecyeon	Go Crazy!	2014	
"Red"	Jennifer Eunsoo Kim; Andreas Gustaf Erik Öberg; Jimmy Burney; Chris Wahle; Taecyeon	No.5	2015	
"Say Yes" Junho solo	Junho; Hong Ji-sang; Shin Bong-won; Yu Shimoji	Legend of 2PM (Limited Edition B)	2013	
"Set Me Free"	Junho; Hong Ji-sang; Yu Shimoji	Galaxy of 2PM	2016	
"Sexy Ladies"	Jun. K Shoko Fujibayashi	2PM of 2PM	2015	
"Sexy Lady" Wooyoung solo	J.Y. Park	23, Male, Single	2012	
"Share the Beat"		Promotional single for Coca-Cola	2012	
"Shall We?"	Bumzu; Lee Joo-hyung; Jonas Mengler	Gentlemen's Game	2016	
"She's Ma Girl"	Ha Jung-ho	Go Crazy!	2014	
"Shining in the Night" #	Rainstone	QQ Dance 2 OST	2013	
"Shining Star"	Chansung; Super Changddai; Risa Horie	Galaxy of 2PM	2016	
"Shiny Girl"	Kazuhiro Hara; Yuhki Shirai; Michael Yano	2PM of 2PM	2015	
"Slender Man"	Taecyeon; Ryan IM; Kim Seung-soo; Song Ji-wook; Yu Shimoji	2PM of 2PM	2015	
"So Bad"	J.Y. Park; Natsumi Watanabe; Michael Yano	Legend of 2PM	2013	
"So Many Girls" Junho solo	Junho; Hong Ji-sang; Kenn Kato	Higher (Junho Version)	2016	
"So Wonderful" Nichkhun solo	Jun. K Emyli	Genesis of 2PM (Limited Edition B)	2014	
"SOS Man"	J.Y. Park; Kenn Kato; Garfunkel	Legend of 2PM	2013	
"Souzoushitemite"	Wooyoung; Frants; Shoko Fujibayashi	Galaxy of 2PM	2016	
"Space Maza" (Note: Remix version of "Maza")	Super Changddai	Don't Stop Can't Stop	2010	
"Spring Breeze ~Good-Bye Again~"	ArmySlick; Jam9; Risa Horie	2PM of 2PM	2015	
"Stay Here"	Collapsedone; Hong Ji-sang; Natsumi Watanabe; Michael Yano	Winter Games	2013	
"Stay With Me"	Tommy Park; Kenn Kato; Komu	Republic of 2PM	2011	
"Step by Step"	Paul Drew; Greig Watts; Pete Barringer; Claire Rodrigues; Joe Killington; Michael Yano; Faya; Jam9	Genesis of 2PM	2014	
"Still"	Hong Ji-sang; J.Y. Park	Still 02:00PM	2010	
"Superman" Jun. K and Wooyoung	Jun. K Wooyoung; Young Sky; Boytoy	Go Crazy! (Grand Edition)	2014	
"Take Off" †	J.Y. Park; Super Changddai; Akihito Tanaka; Kenn Kato; Komu	Take Off	2011	
"Talk About Your Love"	Kazuhiro Hara; Yu Shimoji; Michael Yano	Galaxy of 2PM	2016	
"Teaser"	Taecyeon; Raphael; Kenko-P	Galaxy of 2PM	2016	
"Thank You" †	J.Y. Park	Non-album single	2010	
"This Christmas" with JYP Nation	J.Y. Park	Non-album single	2010	
"This Is Love"	Junho; Hong Ji-sang; Mai Watarai; Michael Yano	Legend of 2PM	2013	
"This Is Love" Wooyoung solo	Wooyoung; Hong Ji-sang; Han Jae-sung	Grown (Grand Edition)	2013	
"Through the Fire"	Kazuhiro Hara; Kenn Kato; Simon	2PM of 2PM	2015	
"The Time We Have Spent Together"	Junho; Hong Ji-sang; Natsumi Watanabe	Galaxy of 2PM	2016	
"Tired of Waiting"	Super Changddai	01:59PM	2009	
"Tik Tok" featuring Yoon Eun-hye	Jennifer Eunsoo Kim; Tommy Park	Promotional single for Cass Beer	2010	
"Traición" Taecyeon solo	Taecyeon	Grown (Grand Edition)	2013	
"True Swag" Jun. K solo	Jun. K Super Changddai	Legend of 2PM (Limited Edition B)	2013	
"Two of Us"	Kim Won; Yoo Young-ho	Must	2021	
"Ultra Lover" †	Super Changddai; Yu Shimoji; Nice73	Ultra Lover	2011	
"Uneasy"	Chansung; Jimmy Burney; Jonas W. Karlsson	Gentlemen's Game	2016	
"Unmei"	Super Changddai; Kenn Kato; Nice73	Republic of 2PM	2011	
"Urahara"	Jun. K Shoko Fujibayashi	With Me Again	2021	
"Versus" Junho and Chansung	Junho; Hong Ji-sang; Shoko Fujibayashi	Galaxy of 2PM (Junho x Chansung Edition)	2016	
"Wanna Love You Again"	Chansung; Taecyeon	No.5	2015	
"Want You Back"	Michael Yano; Kohei Yokono; Natsumi Watanabe; Mai Watarai	Legend of 2PM	2013	
"What Time Is It Now?"	J.Y. Park	2:00PM Time for Change	2009	
"What's Your Celebration?"		Promotional single for Coca-Cola	2010	
"WHPH" Jun. K solo	Jun. K Super Changddai; Simon	2PM of 2PM (Limited Edition B)	2015	
"Win the Day" Nichkhun and Junho, with Team SIII	Han Jae-ho; Kim Seung-su; Song Su-yun	Promotional single for Samsung Galaxy S III	2010	
"Winter Games" †	Super Changddai; Michael Yano; Natsumi Watanabe	Winter Games	2013	
"With Me Again" †	Jun. K Flum3n; Mayu Wakisaka	With Me Again	2021	
"With Me Again" (Taalthechoi Remix)	Jun. K Flum3n; Mayu Wakisaka	With Me Again	2021	
"Without U" †	J.Y. Park	Don't Stop Can't Stop	2010	
"Without U" (Explorer Mix)	J.Y. Park	Don't Stop Can't Stop	2010	
"Without U" (Japanese ver.)	J.Y. Park; Yu Shimoji; Komu	I'm Your Man	2011	
"The Word, Love" Taecyeon and Chansung	Chansung; Taecyeon	Go Crazy! (Grand Edition)	2014	
"Wow"	Junho; Hong Ji-sang; Yu-ki Kokubo	Promise (I'll Be) -Japanese ver.-	2016	
"You Are a Miracle" Jun. K, Nichkhun, Wooyoung, and Chansung, with SBS Gayo Daejeon Friendship Project	Kim Hyeong-seok; Kim Do-hyun; Kim Eana	Non-album single	2013	
"Zero Point"	Junho; Hong Ji-sang	Grown	2013	

== See also ==
- 2PM discography
- Jun. K discography
- Lee Jun-ho discography
