= List of songs written by Taecyeon =

Ok Taec-yeon, composing as Taecyeon a.k.a TY, is a South Korean actor, entrepreneur, singer, songwriter and the main rapper of the South Korean boy group 2PM. In 2012, Taecyeon teamed up with his fellow Dankook University alumni students to produce a digital album and then began writing and composing songs for his solo stage at 2PM's Japanese concert, Six Beautiful Days. Taecyeon started actively participating in writing and composing songs for 2PM the following year.

== Songs ==
Year	Album	Artist(s)	Song	Lyrics		Music		Ref.
Year	Album	Artist(s)	Song	Credited	With	Credited	With	Ref.
2012	Share (나눔)	Blue Bears and Taecyeon	"Wing"(날개)	Rap	Yang Ji-hoon	No	Yang Ji-hoon	
2012	Share (나눔)	Blue Bears and Taecyeon	"A Night Like This"(오늘 같은 밤)	Rap	Lee Jung-sun	No	Lee Jung-sun	
2012		Taecyeon	"Kiss"	Yes		Yes		
2012		Taecyeon ft. Yeeun	"After You Left Me"	Yes		Yes		
2013	Legend of 2PM	Taecyeon	"Only You"(君だけに)	Yes		Yes		
2013	We Got Married OST	Taecyeon and Gui Gui	"I Love You"	Yes		Yes		
2013		Taecyeon	"I Love You, You Love Me"	Yes		Yes		
2013	Grown	2PM	"Comeback When You Hear This Song"(이 노래를 듣고 돌아와)	Rap	J.Y. Park "The Asiansoul"	No	J.Y. Park "The Asiansoul"	
2013	Grown	2PM	"A.D.T.O.Y."(하.니.뿐)	Rap	J.Y. Park "The Asiansoul"	No	J.Y. Park "The Asiansoul"	
2013	Grown	2PM	"I’m Sorry"	Rap	Dokebi	No	Dokebi	
2013	Grown	2PM	"One More Day" (오늘 하루만)	Rap	Shim Eunji	No	Shim Eunji	
2013	Grown	2PM	"Coming Down"	Rap	Hwang Chan-sung	No	east4A	
2013	Grown	2PM	"Go Back"(고백)	Rap	Hong Ji-sang, Lee Jun-ho	No	Hong Ji-sang, Lee Jun-ho	
2013	Grown (Grand Edition)	Taecyeon feat. San E and Yubin	"It's Time"	Yes	San E, Yubin	Yes		
2013	Grown (Grand Edition)	Taecyeon	"Traición"	Yes		Yes		
2013	Grown (Grand Edition)	2PM	"Call My Name" (내 이름을 불러줘)	Yes		Yes		
2013	Marriage Blue OST	Taecyeon	"Marriage Blue Opening" (결혼전야 Opening)	Yes		Yes		
2013		Taecyeon	"Okcat Song" (옥캣송)	Yes		Yes		
2013		Taecyeon	"Okcat Song" (옥캣송) (Christmas ver.)	Yes		Yes		
2014	Genesis of 2PM	Taecyeon	"It's Only You"	Yes		Yes		
2014	Go Crazy!	2PM	"Awesome!"	Rap	Laybacksound	No	Laybacksound	
2014	Go Crazy!	2PM	"Rain Is Falling" (비가와)	Rap	Glory Face	No	Glory Face, Alto	
2014	Go Crazy!	2PM	"Boyfriend"	Rap	Hwang Chansung	No	Hwang Chansung, Shim Eun-ji	
2014	Go Crazy!	2PM	"Mine"	Rap	Hwang Chansung	No	Ilanguaq "ilang" Lumholt, Lasse Lindorff, Thor Norgaard, Mads Moller	
2014	Go Crazy!	2PM	"Pull&Pull"	Rap	Ragoon IM, Ryan IM	No	Ragoon IM, Ryan IM	
2014	Go Crazy! (Grand Edition)	Taecyeon andChansungfeat. Baek A-yeon	"Please Come Back" (돌아와줘)	Yes		Yes		
2014	Go Crazy! (Grand Edition)	Taecyeon and Chansung	"The Word, Love" (사랑한단 말)	Rap	Hwang Chansung	No	Hwang Chansung	
2014	JYP Nation Korea 2014 'One Mic'	Taecyeon and Lim Seul-ong	"U Don't Know"	Yes		Yes		
2014		Taecyeon	"Christmas With You"	Yes		Yes		
2015	2PM of 2PM	2PM	"Fight"	Yes	Raphael, Johyo	Yes	Raphael, Johyo	
2015	2PM of 2PM	2PM	"Slender Man"	Yes	Kim Seung-soo, Song Ji-wook	Yes	Kim Seung-soo, Song Ji-wook	
2015	2PM of 2PM	Taecyeon ft. Baek Ye-rin	"Chocolate" (チョコレート)	Yes	Baek Ye-rin	Yes	Raphael	
2015	No.5	2PM	"About to Go Insane" (미칠 것 같아)	Yes	Raphael	Yes	Raphael	
2015	No.5	2PM	"Magic"	Yes	Raphael	Yes	Raphael	
2015	No.5	2PM	"Jump"	Yes	Raphael	Yes	Raphael	
2015	No.5	2PM	"Hallucination" (환각)	Rap	e.one	No	e.one	
2015	No.5	2PM	"Not The Only One (너만의 남자)	Rap	Jun. K	No	Kim Tae-sung, Frost, Secret Weapon, Jun.K	
2015	No.5	2PM	"Red"	Rap	Kim Eun-su	No	Andreas Oberg, Chris Wahle, Jimmy Burney	
2015	No.5	2PM	"Wanna Love You Again"	Rap	Hwang Chan-sung	No	Hwang Chan-sung	
2015	No.5	2PM	"Good Man"	Rap	Hwang Chan-sung	No	Hwang Chan-sung, Ryan IM	
2015		Taecyeon	"Never Give Up"	Yes		Yes		
2015		Taecyeon	"It's Not Only You" (君だけじゃない)	Yes		Yes		
2015		Taecyeon	"Be My Merry Christmas"	Yes		Yes		
2016	Galaxy of 2PM	2PM	"Don't Forget"(忘れないで)	Yes	Raphael, Risa Horie	Yes	Raphael	
2016	Galaxy of 2PM	2PM	"Teaser"	Yes	Raphael, Kenko-p	Yes	Raphael	
2016	Galaxy of 2PM	Taecyeon and Jun. K	"50 50" (Taecyeon rap ver.)	Rap	Jun. K, Michael Yano	No	Jun. K, Boytoy	
2016		Taecyeon, Nichkhun, Tzuyu, Jeongyeon	"Summer Together"	Yes	Raphael	Yes	Raphael	
2016	Gentlemen's Game	2PM	"Promise (I'll Be)"	Yes	Lesley Chiang, Raphael	Yes	Lesley Chiang, Raphael	
2016	Gentlemen's Game	2PM	"Make Love"	Rap	Hwang Chansung	No	Hwang Chansung, LEL	
2016	Gentlemen's Game	2PM	"Perfume"(향수)	Rap	e.one	No	e.one	
2016	Gentlemen's Game	2PM	"Can't Stop Feeling"	Rap	Hwang Chansung	No	Hwang Chansung, LEL	
2016		Taecyeon	"Merry Christmas to You"	Yes		Yes		
2017	Taecyeon Special ～Winter Hitori～	Taecyeon	"Winter Alone" (Winter 一人)	Yes	Raphael, Yu-ki Kokubo	Yes	Raphael	
2017	Taecyeon Special ～Winter Hitori～	Taecyeon	"Don't Want to" (やりたくない)	Yes	Raphael, Yhanael	Yes	Raphael	
2017	Taecyeon Special ～Winter Hitori～	Taecyeon	"Toc Toc Toc"	Yes	Raphael	Yes	Raphael	
2017	Taecyeon Special ～Winter Hitori～	Taecyeon	"Move Your Body"	Yes	Raphael, Yhanael	Yes	Raphael	
2017	T-WITH	Kim Tae-woo feat. Jun. K & Taecyeon	"Just Feeling" (느낌적인 느낌)	Yes	Geonjeongayoyeonhab, Jun. K	No	Geonjeongayoyeonhab, Jun. K	
2019		Taecyeon	“Anyway”					
2019		Taecyeon	“Give You All”					
2021	Must	2PM	“Champagne”	Yes	Raphael	Yes	Raphael	
2023		Taecyeon	“ParTY Like TY”					
