= Winter Games (2PM song) =

- Regular edition cover

Single by 2PM

from the album Genesis of 2PM
- B-side: "Stay Here"
- Released: October 16, 2013
- Recorded: 2013
- Genre: J-pop; Dance-pop; Ballad
- Length: 3:27
- Label: Epic Records Japan
- Composer: Super Changddai
- Lyricists: Super Changddai; Natsumi Watanabe; Michael Yano

2PM singles chronology
"Give Me Love" (2013)	"Winter Games" (2013)	"Go Crazy!" / "Midaretemina" (2014)

Music video
- "Winter Games" on YouTube

"Winter Games" is the seventh Japanese single by the South Korean boy band 2PM. It was released on October 16, 2013, in three different editions. The single was the group's first song to top the Oricon Singles Chart and the Billboard Japan Hot 100 chart.

== Background and release ==
The song "Winter Games" was first performed at 2PM's first official fan meeting in Japan titled YaZoo on September 7–8, 2013, a month before the single's official release. The song is a sentimental ballad in the dance-pop genre themed around winter, composed by Super Changddai.

The single includes "Stay Here" as B-side track, which was originally intended to be included as a B-side track for the group's previous single, "Masquerade". The limited edition B version comes with a bonus track, the Japanese version of "Comeback When You Hear This Song" from their third Korean studio album Grown. The music video of "Winter Games" features South Korean actress Shim Ji-won.

On September 9, 2013, the single's jacket photos were released on 2PM's official Japanese website. The B-side "Stay Here" was pre-released as a ringtone on September 30, 2013, topping RecoChoku's daily ringtone charts.

== Promotion ==
2PM performed "Winter Games" on Japanese television music shows, including the October 24, 2013 episode of Music Japan and the October 25, 2013 episode of Music Dragon. The group then held a "Hi Touch" fan event on November 2, 2013 at Tokyo Big Sight. In addition, the group held special shows titled 2PM Xmas Live 2013 in Universal Studios Japan on November 23–24, 2013, where they performed several songs including "Winter Games" to a total attendance of 11,000 fans.

== Commercial performance ==
"Winter Games" sold about 109,000 copies in its debut week, becoming the group's first single to chart at number-one on the Oricon Singles Chart. The song also became the group's first single to chart at number-one on the Billboard Japan Hot Albums chart. The single was certified Gold by the Recording Industry Association of Japan for selling over 100,000 copies.

== Track listing ==
Ver. A (CD+DVD) & regular edition (CD-only) track list
No.	Title	Lyrics	Music	Arrangement	Length
1.	"Winter Games"	Super Changddai; Natsumi Watanabe; Michael Yano	Super Changddai	Super Changddai	3:27
2.	"Stay Here"	Watanabe; Hong Ji-sang; Michael Yano; Min Lee (Collapsedone)	Hong; Collapsedone	Hong; Collapsedone	3:24
3.	"Winter Games" (instrumental)		Super Changddai	Super Changddai	3:27
4.	"Stay Here" (instrumental)		Hong; Collapsedone	Hong; Collapsedone	3:21
Total length:					13:39

Ver. B (CD-only) track list
No.	Title	Lyrics	Music	Arranger	Length
1.	"Winter Games"	Super Changddai; Watanabe; Yano	Super Changddai	Super Changddai	3:27
2.	"Stay Here"	Watanabe; Hong; Yano; Collapsedone	Hong; Collapsedone	Hong; Collapsedone	3:24
3.	"Comeback When You Hear This Song" (この歌を聴いて戻ってきて)	J.Y. Park; Watanabe; Yano	Park	Park	3:43
4.	"Winter Games" (instrumental)		Super Changddai	Super Changddai	3:27
5.	"Stay Here" (instrumental)		Hong; Collapsedone	Hong; Collapsedone	3:21
Total length:					17:22

DVD ver. A
No.	Title	Length
1.	"Winter Games Jacket Shooting Making Movie"

== Charts ==
=== Oricon ===
Oricon Chart	Peak	Debut sales	Sales total	Ref.
Daily Singles Chart	1	65,696	108,537	
Weekly Singles Chart	1	108,537	108,537	

=== Other Charts ===
Chart	Peak position	Ref.
Billboard Japan Hot 100	1	

== Release history ==
Country	Date	Format	Label	Ref.
Japan	October 16, 2013	Digital download, CD, CD + DVD	Epic Records Japan	
Korea	November 7, 2013	Digital download	JYP Entertainment	
