= Higher (2PM song) =

- Regular edition cover

Single by 2PM

from the album Galaxy of 2PM
- B-side: "My House (Japanese ver.)"
- Released: October 21, 2015
- Recorded: 2015
- Genre: J-pop; Dance-pop; Hip-hop
- Length: 3:04
- Label: Epic Records Japan
- Composers: Jun. K; Lel
- Lyricists: Jun. K; Morizuki Kyasu; Simon

2PM singles chronology
"My House" (2015)	"Higher" (2015)	"Promise (I'll Be)" (2016)

Music video
- "Higher" on YouTube

"Higher" (stylized in all caps) is the tenth Japanese single by South Korean boy band 2PM, released on October 21, 2015 in eight editions by Epic Records Japan. The single peaked at number two on both the Oricon Singles Chart and the Billboard Japan Hot 100. It was certified Gold by the Recording Industry Association of Japan for selling over 100,000 copies.

== Background and release ==
2PM announced the release of "Higher" at their final House Party in Japan concert at Saitama Super Arena on August 23, 2015. Due to the single's milestone status as the group's tenth Japanese single, the single would also be released in six solo member editions, each with a different album jacket and a solo song. From August 25–30, 2015, jacket photos and tracklists for each of the six solo member editions of the single were revealed online via 2PM's official Japanese website. Starting from September 29, 2015, each of the nine tracks from "Higher" was pre-released daily as a ringtone version. "Higher" was released on October 21, 2015 in eight editions: a regular edition, a CD + DVD edition, and six solo member editions.

== Composition ==
"Higher" is a dance-pop and hip-hop track co-written by 2PM member Jun. K, starting with piano instrumentation and shifting between multiple genres, such as jazz. The lyrics of the song are about the feeling of being in love and becoming a better man as a result. Writer Kaori Simon for Real Sound noted that the melody of the song's chorus felt inspired by J-pop, unlike Jun. K's first composition released as a lead single by the group, "Midaretemina", which was originally written for the South Korean market.

The single's B-side track is a Japanese version of "My House", the title track of the group's fifth Korean studio album, No.5 (2015), also co-written 2PM member Jun. K. The CD + DVD version includes the bonus track "Chikai no Christmas", a warm song co-written by 2PM member Junho. Each solo member edition replaces "My House" (Japanese ver.) with a different solo track ranging in genres, from the hip-hop track "Everest" by Jun. K to the powerful anthem song "Never Give Up" by Taecyeon.

== Promotion ==
In conjunction with the release of the single, 2PM embarked on a concert series titled Six "Higher" Days was held from October 7–28, 2015, with three shows each in four locations: Nippon Budokan, Osaka-jō Hall, Yokohama Arena, and Nippon Gaishi Hall. The concert series was considered a spiritual successor to their Six Beautiful Days concert series in 2012, with shows featuring a different member's solo performances as part of the setlist. Every track from each edition of "Higher" was performed at this concert series.

The group also performed the song on Japanese television shows such as the October 18, 2015 episode of NHK's music program Music Japan. The group also held a "Hi Touch" fan event on October 24, 2015 at Makuhari Messe for the release of the single. Furthermore, the group appeared on the cover of the October 8, 2015 issue of the Japanese women's fashion magazine Hanako, the magazine's first issue since its revamp.

== Commercial performance ==
Following the single's release, "Higher" topped the Oricon Daily Singles Chart and the Tower Records Nationwide K-pop Single Weekly Chart. The single peaked at number two on the Oricon Singles Chart, charting for five weeks, and on the Billboard Japan Hot 100, charting for 3 weeks. Within one week, the single sold about 118,000 copies, resulting in it becoming certified Gold by the Recording Industry Association of Japan in October 2015 for selling over 100,000 copies.

== Track listing ==
Regular edition track listing
No.	Title	Lyrics	Music	Arrangements	Length
1.	"Higher"	Jun. K; Morizuki Kyasu; Simon	Jun. K; Lel	Jun. K; Lel	3:05
2.	"My House" (Japanese ver.)	Jun. K; Shoko Fujibayashi	Jun. K; Lel	Jun. K; Lel	3:10
3.	"Higher" (instrumental)		Jun. K; Lel	Jun. K; Lel	3:05
4.	"My House" (Japanese ver., without main vocal)		Jun. K; Lel	Jun. K; Lel	3:08
Total length:					12:28

CD+DVD track listing
No.	Title	Lyrics	Music	Arrangements	Length
1.	"Higher"	Jun. K; Kyasu; Simon	Jun. K; Lel	Jun. K; Lel	3:05
2.	"My House" (Japanese ver.)	Jun. K; Fujibayashi	Jun. K; Lel	Jun. K; Lel	3:10
3.	"Chikai no Christmas" (誓いのクリスマス)	Junho; Hong Ji-sang; Yu Shimoji	Junho; Hong	Hong	4:05
4.	"Higher" (instrumental)		Jun. K; Lel	Jun. K; Lel	3:05
5.	"My House" (Japanese ver., without main vocal)		Jun. K; Lel	Jun. K; Lel	3:08
Total length:					16:33

Jun. K Version track listing
No.	Title	Lyrics	Music	Arrangement	Length
2.	"Everest" (Jun. K solo)	Jun. K; Simon	Jun. K; Lel; Boytoy	Lel; Boytoy	3:47
4.	"Everest" (instrumental)		Jun. K; Lel; Boytoy	Lel; Boytoy	3:44
Total length:					13:41

Nichkhun Version track listing
No.	Title	Lyrics	Music	Arrangement	Length
2.	"Maybe You Are" (Nichkhun solo)	Ryan IM; Natsumi Watanabe; Lauren Kaori	Ryan IM	Ryan IM; Hong Younghwan IM	3:09
4.	"Maybe You Are" (instrumental)		Ryan IM	Ryan IM; Hong Younghwan IM	3:07
Total length:					12:26

Taecyeon Version track listing
No.	Title	Lyrics	Music	Arrangement	Length
2.	"Never Give Up" (Taecyeon solo)	Taecyeon; Samuelle Soung	Taecyeon; Raphael	Taecyeon; Raphael	3:37
4.	"Never Give Up" (instrumental)		Taecyeon; Raphael	Taecyeon; Raphael	3:35
Total length:					13:22

Wooyoung Version track listing
No.	Title	Lyrics	Music	Arrangement	Length
2.	"Hanpa Nai" (ハンパない) (Wooyoung solo)	Wooyoung; Super Kiro; Yu Shimoji	Wooyoung; Super Kiro	Super Kiro	3:31
4.	"Hanpa Nai" (instrumental)		Wooyoung; Super Kiro	Super Kiro	3:29
Total length:					13:10

Junho Version track listing
No.	Title	Lyrics	Music	Arrangement	Length
2.	"So Many Girls" (Junho solo)	Junho; Hong Ji-sang; Kenn Kato	Junho; Hong	Hong	3:32
4.	"So Many Girls" (instrumental)		Junho; Hong	Hong	3:30
Total length:					13:12

Chansung Version track listing
No.	Title	Lyrics	Music	Arrangement	Length
2.	"Miss You" (Chansung solo)	Chansung; Super Changddai; Risa Horie	Chansung; Super Changddai	Super Changddai	4:05
4.	"Miss You" (instrumental)		Chansung; Super Changddai	Super Changddai	4:03
Total length:					14:18

DVD (limited edition A only)
No.	Title	Length
1.	"Higher" (music video)
2.	"Higher" (music video – dance ver.)
3.	"My House" (Japanese ver.) (music video)

== Charts ==
=== Weekly charts ===
Chart (2015)	Peak position
Japan (Oricon Singles Chart)	2
Japan (Billboard Japan Hot 100)	2

== Sales ==
Country	Sales
Japan	137,238

== Release history ==
Release history for "Higher"
Region	Date	Format	Label
Japan	October 21, 2015	CD, CD + DVD, Digital download	Epic Records Japan
South Korea	August 18, 2016	Digital download	JYP Entertainment
