= Give Me Love (2PM song) =

- Regular edition cover

Single by 2PM

from the album Genesis of 2PM
- B-side: "Falling in Love"
- Released: May 29, 2013
- Recorded: 2013
- Genre: J-pop; Dance-pop
- Length: 3:59
- Label: Ariola Japan
- Composers: NA.ZU.NA; M.I
- Lyricists: Natsumi Watanabe; Michael Yano

2PM singles chronology
"A.D.T.O.Y." (2013)	"Give Me Love" (2013)	"Winter Games" (2013)

Music video
- "Give Me Love" on YouTube

"Give Me Love" is the sixth Japanese single by the South Korean boy band 2PM, released on May 29, 2013 by Ariola Japan in three different editions. The song was used as the opening theme for the Japanese drama Take Five ~Can We Steal Love?~. It charted at number two on the Oricon Singles Chart and number three on the Billboard Japan Hot 100.

== Background and release ==
Prior to the song's official release, "Give Me Love" was chosen by Japanese producer Hidenori Iyoda as the opening theme song for his TBS Television drama, Take Five ~Can We Steal Love?~, which started airing on April 19, 2013. On the same date, a ringtone version of "Give Me Love" and the jacket cover photos for the single were released; the ringtone version topped the Recochoku ringtone chart.

On May 29, 2013, the single was released by Ariola Japan in three different editions: a regular edition and two CD + DVD editions. Both "Give Me Love" and B-side track "Falling in Love" were later included in the group's third Japanese studio album, Genesis of 2PM (2014), and "Give Me Love" was also included in a 2014 J-pop compilation album by DJ Kaori titled DJ Kaori's Jmix VI.

== Composition ==
"Give Me Love" is a dance-pop song about being in love, with lyrics using words such as "fate" and "destiny" to describe it. The single includes the B-side track and summer anthem "Falling in Love, a song composed by 2PM member Jun. K, which was on the original track list for the group's previous Japanese single, "Masquerade". Like "Give Me Love", "Falling in Love" was also pre-released as a ringtone, topping the Recochoku Daily Ringtone chart. The regular CD-only edition also includes a remix of "Give Me Love" by Japanese music producer ArmySlick.

== Music video ==
The music video for "Give Me Love" was first shown at 2PM's Legend of 2PM concerts held at the Tokyo Dome on April 20–21, 2013. The desert setting seen in the music video was filmed in Buan County, a coastal area of South Korea. In the video, which primarily focuses on the choreography of the song, the members depict spies who "steal the hearts of women".

== Promotion ==
"Give Me Love" was first performed live at 2PM's Legend of 2PM concerts held at the Tokyo Dome on April 20–21, 2013 to a total of 110,000 fans. In promotion of the single, 2PM appeared on the live broadcast GyaO! Live Talk on May 29, 2013 and held a "Hi Touch" fan event at Tokyo Big Sight on June 16, 2013. The group also performed "Give Me Love" on Japanese television shows such as the June 6, 2013 episode of NHK's music program Music Japan.

== Commercial performance ==
"Give Me Love" quickly topped the Tower Records pre-order chart upon announcement. Upon release, the single debuted at number one on the Tower Records' daily and weekly singles chart and number two on Oricon's Daily and Weekly Singles Chart. The single charted on the Oricon Singles Chart for a total of five weeks. It also charted on the Billboard Japan Hot 100 for three weeks, peaking at number three. The single was certified Gold by the Recording Industry Association of Japan the same month of its release for selling over 100,000 copies.

== Track listing ==
CD+DVD track listing
No.	Title	Lyrics	Music	Arrangement	Length
1.	"Give Me Love"	Natsumi Watanabe; Michael Yano	NA.ZU.NA; M.I	NA.ZU.NA; M.I	3:59
2.	"Falling in Love"	Jun. K; Faya; Yano	Jun. K	Peter & Young Sky (of D2O)	3:39
3.	"Give Me Love" (instrumental)		NA.ZU.NA; M.I	NA.ZU.NA; M.I	3:59
4.	"Falling in Love" (instrumental)		Jun. K	Peter & Young Sky (of D2O)	3:37
Total length:					15:14

CD-only track listing
No.	Title	Lyrics	Music	Arrangement	Length
1.	"Give Me Love"	Watanabe; Yano	NA.ZU.NA; M.I	NA.ZU.NA; M.I	3:59
2.	"Falling in Love"	Jun. K; Faya; Yano	Jun. K	Peter & Young Sky (of D2O)	3:39
3.	"Give Me Love" (ArmySlick's bavtronic mix)	Jun. K; Faya; Yano	Jun. K	ArmySlick	4:17
4.	"Give Me Love" (instrumental)		NA.ZU.NA; M.I	NA.ZU.NA; M.I	3:59
5.	"Falling in Love" (instrumental)		Jun. K	Peter & Young Sky (of D2O)	3:37
Total length:					19:31

DVD (limited edition ver.A)
No.	Title	Length
1.	"Give Me Love" (music video)
2.	"Give Me Love" (music video – dance ver.)

DVD (limited edition ver.B)
No.	Title	Length
1.	"Give Me Love" (music video – off shot movie)

== Charts ==
=== Oricon ===
Oricon Chart	Peak	Debut sales	Total
Daily Singles Chart	2	81,825	151,841+
Weekly Singles Chart	2	137,755	151,841+

=== Other charts ===
Chart	Peak
Billboard Japan Hot 100	3

== Release history ==
Country	Date	Format	Label
Japan	May 29, 2013	Digital download, CD, CD + DVD	Ariola Japan
South Korea	July 2, 2013	Digital download	JYP Entertainment
