= Guilty Love =

- Regular edition cover

Single by 2PM

from the album 2PM of 2PM
- B-side: "365"
- Released: January 28, 2015
- Recorded: 2014
- Genre: J-pop; Dance-pop; Funk
- Length: 3:46
- Label: Epic Records Japan
- Composers: Yuuki Ishino (Jam9); Masaki lehara
- Lyricists: Risa Horie; Yuhki Shirai; Michael Yano

2PM singles chronology
"Go Crazy!" / "Midaretemina" (2014)	"Guilty Love" (2015)	"My House" (2015)

Music video
- "Guilty Love" on YouTube

"Guilty Love" is the ninth Japanese single by South Korean boy band 2PM, released on January 28, 2015 in four editions by Epic Records Japan. The single was the group's second to top the Oricon Singles Chart and the group's third to top the Billboard Japan Hot 100.

== Background and release ==
"Guilty Love" and B-side track "365" were first performed on January 3–4, 2015 at 2PM's second fan meeting in Japan, titled New Year’s Party 2015 "Old Boy vs Young Boy", to a total of 40,000 fans at Saitama Super Arena. The single was released on January 28, 2015 in four editions: a regular CD-only edition, two CD + DVD editions, and a LP size jacket limited edition which includes remixes of "Guilty Love" and "365".

== Composition ==
"Guilty Love" is a dance-pop song with heavy funk elements featuring horn instrumentation. The lyrics of the song are from the perspective of a "sinful man" trying to seduce a woman he is attracted to. The B-side track is "365", a composition by 2PM member Junho and a bright pop song with lyrics about the joy of spending each day of the year with a loved one.

== Music video ==
Prior to the release of the single, a short version of the music video for "365" was released on YouTube on December 15, 2014, with the full version being uploaded on January 5, 2015. The music video was filmed in Phuket, Thailand, depicting the group having fun by the water.

The music video for "Guilty Love" features the members wearing various suits, dancing a jazz dance-inspired choreography that primarily focuses on footwork. The music video is set inside of a jukebox. Writer Kaori Simon for Real Sound noted the choreography as "understated yet subtly sensual" due to the group's mature and masculine image.

== Promotion ==
In promotion of the single, 2PM held special shows titled 2PM New Year Live 2015 at Universal Studios Japan on January 10–11, 2015, performing various songs including "Guilty Love" and "365" to a total audience of 12,000 people, their second time performing at the theme park since 2013. The group also appeared on various Japanese television shows to perform "Guilty Love", including the January 26, 2015 and February 1, 2015 episodes of NHK's music program Music Japan.

The group held two "Hi Touch" fan events for the release of the single, one on January 31, 2015 at Intex Osaka, and the second on February 8, 2015 at Makuhari Messe. A pop-up event in collaboration with Sony's Walkman brand took place at the Sony Building in Tokyo from January 27, 2015 to February 24, 2015, in which attendees could listen to "Guilty Love" in high-resolution audio. Additionally, limited edition 2PM-themed models of the Walkman A Series and Walkman S Series were released, pre-installed with high-resolution audio tracks of "Guilty Love and "365", wallpaper designs, the dance version of the "Guilty Love" music video, the making movie of "Guilty Love", and video messages from 2PM members.

== Commercial performance ==
"Guilty Love" debuted at number-one on the Oricon Singles Chart, their second single to accomplish this feat since "Winter Games", and charted for a total of four weeks. The single also became their third single to top the Billboard Japan Hot Albums chart after "Winter Games" and "Midaretemina", charting for a total of 3 weeks. The single was certified Gold by the Recording Industry Association of Japan in the same month as its release for selling over 100,000 copies.

== Track listing ==
CD+DVD and CD-only track listing
No.	Title	Lyrics	Music	Arrangement	Length
1.	"Guilty Love"	Risa Horie; Yuhki Shirai; Michael Yano	Yuuki Ishino (Jam9); Masaki lehara	Jam9; Masaki lehara	3:46
2.	"365"	Junho; Yu Shimoji; Hong Ji-sang; Shin Bong-won	Junho	Junho	3:45
3.	"Guilty Love" (instrumental)		Jam9; Masaki lehara	Jam9; Masaki lehara	3:46
4.	"365" (instrumental)		Junho	Junho	3:45
Total length:					13:82

LP size jacket limited edition
No.	Title	Lyrics	Music	Arrangement	Length
1.	"Guilty Love"	Risa Horie; Yuhki Shirai; Michael Yano	Jam9; Masaki lehara	Jam9; Masaki lehara	3:46
2.	"365"	Junho; Yu Shimoji; Hong Ji-sang; Shin Bong-won	Junho	Junho	3:45
3.	"Guilty Love" (Collapsedone remix)	Horie; Shirai; Yano	Jam9; Masaki lehara	Min Lee (Collapsedone)	3:46
4.	"365" (Starlight version)	Junho; Yu; Hong; Shin	Junho	Hong; Shin	3:45
Total length:					13:82

DVD (Ver. A)
No.	Title	Length
1.	"Guilty Love" (music video)
2.	"365" (music video)

DVD (Ver. B)
No.	Title	Length
1.	"Guilty Love" (making movie)
2.	"365" (making movie)

== Charts ==
=== Oricon ===
Oricon Chart	Peak	Debut sales	Sales total
Daily Singles Chart	1	57,026	109,377
Weekly Singles Chart	1	98,229	109,377

=== Other charts ===
Chart	Peak position
Billboard Japan Hot Albums	1

== Release history ==
Country	Date	Format	Label
Japan	January 28, 2015	Digital download, CD, CD + DVD	Epic Records Japan
Korea	February 25, 2015	Digital download	JYP Entertainment
