= No.5 (2PM album) =

- Digital and "White" version

Studio album by 2PM
- Released: June 15, 2015
- Recorded: 2015
- Studio: JYP Studios
- Genres: K-pop; Contemporary R&B
- Length: 42:31
- Language: Korean
- Label: JYP Entertainment

2PM chronology
2PM of 2PM (2015)	No.5 (2015)	Galaxy of 2PM (2016)

Singles from No.5
- 1. "My House" Released: June 15, 2015

No.5 (stylized as №5) is the fifth Korean studio album (ninth overall) by South Korean boy band 2PM. The album was released in both physical and digital format on June 15, 2015, by JYP Entertainment.

Professional ratings
Review scores
Source	Rating
Billboard	4/5 stars

== Background and release ==
On May 8, 2015, JYP Entertainment announced that the group would be releasing their fifth album on June 1, followed by two concerts titled House Party in Seoul to be held at the Olympic Gymnastics Arena later that month. However, on May 11, the JYP Entertainment announced that the album would be pushed back to mid-June after video production company, Dextor Lab, pulled out of the production for the music video of the album's lead single, resulting in JYP Entertainment taking legal action against the company for the delay. On May 13, JYP said that they would be working with Naive Creative Productions for the music video.

Teaser photos for the group's comeback were released on June 5 and June 8, 2011. The album's track list was revealed on June 10, 2015. The album and the music video for title track "My House" were subsequently released on June 15, 2015 in South Korea.

== Composition ==
The album's lead single, "My House", is a synth-pop and contemporary R&B song co-written and co-composed by member Jun. K, who previously wrote and composed the lead single of their last Korean release, "Go Crazy!". Other group members also participated in the production of the album, with members having writing or composition credits nine of the twelve tracks. The album predominantly features R&B-inspired tracks, while mixing other genres such as funk and electronic. For example, "About to Go Insane" is an electropop song, "Jump" is a high-energy EDM track, and "Good Man" is a sultry jazz-inspired ballad.

== Reception ==
Billboard writer Jeff Benjamin rated the album 4 out of 5 stars, stating that the album "play[s] off their signature sound, but... more confidently and with a wave of sophistication missing in recent releases like Go Crazy! or 2013’s Grown." Billboard later ranked No.5 eighth on their list of "The 10 Best K-Pop Albums of 2015", calling the album the group's "most representative" work to date.

No.5 debuted at number one on the Gaon Album Chart for the week of June 14, 2015. As of 2015, the album had sold 62,618 copies in South Korea. In Japan, the album debuted at number fourteen on the Oricon Albums Chart, selling 6,307 copies in its first week. By the end of June, No.5 had sold 9,132 copies in Japan. In the United States, the album debuted at number three on the Billboard World Albums chart.

At the 2016 IF Product Design Awards, JYP Entertainment won an award under the album packaging design category for No.5.

== Promotion ==
2PM held a live stream titled "2PM is Coming to My House!" (Korean: 2PM이 우리집으로 온다!; RR: 2PMi urijibeuro onda!) via Naver Starcast On Air on the same date as the release of the album, June 15, 2015, in which they showcased several tracks from the album. The group then made appearances on Korean television music programs with title track "My House": Mnet's M Countdown on June 18, KBS's Music Bank on June 19, MBC's Show! Music Core on June 20, SBS's Inkigayo on June 21, and SBS M's The Show on June 23. The group ended promotions after just one week in order to focus on their concerts titled House Party in Seoul on June 27–28. The House Party concert series was later brought to Japan on August 22–23, 2015, as well as to Thailand on March 20, 2016.

In promotion of the album, 2PM starred in Melon's radio show web series Oven Radio from June 15 to June 20.

== Track listing ==
Track list
No.	Title	Lyrics	Music	Arrangements	Length
1.	"My House" (Korean: 우리집; RR: Urijip)	Jun. K	Min-jun; Lel	Lel	3:07
2.	"Nobody Else"	Junho	Junho; Hong Ji-sang	Hong Ji-sang	4:08
3.	"Hallucination" (Korean: 환각; RR: Hwangak)	e.one^{[a]}	e.one	e.one	3:33
4.	"Not The Only One" (Korean: 너만의 남자; RR: Neomanui namja)	Jun. K^{[a]}	Kim Tae-sung; Frost; Secret Weapon; Jun. K	Secret Weapon	3:17
5.	"Hotter Than July" (Korean: 여름보다 뜨거운 너; RR: Yeoreumboda tteugeoun neo; lit. 'Hotter Than Summer')	Chansung^{[a]}	220; Brian Cho; Andrew Choi; Chris Hope; J Faith	220; Brian Cho	3:38
6.	"About To Go Insane" (Korean: 미칠 것 같아; RR: Michil geot gata)	Taecyeon; Raphael	Taecyeon; Raphael	Raphael	3:28
7.	"Red"	Kim Eun-su^{[a]}	Andreas Oberg; Chris Wahle	Chris Wahle	3:46
8.	"Wanna Love You Again"	Chansung^{[a]}	Chansung	Super Changddai	4:05
9.	"Know Your Mind"	Ragoon IM; Ban Mi-sun	Ragoon IM; Ban Mi-sun	Ragoon IM; Ban Mi-sun	3:29
10.	"Magic"	Taecyeon; Raphael	Taecyeon; Raphael	Raphael	3:07
11.	"Jump"	Taecyeon; Raphael	Taecyeon; Raphael	Raphael	3:08
12.	"Good Man"	Chansung^{[a]}	Chansung; Ryan IM	Ryan IM; Hong Young-hwan	3:45
Total length:					42:31

Notes

- ^{^a} Taecyeon is also credited for writing and producing the song's rap.

== Charts ==
=== Weekly charts ===
Chart (2015)	Peak position
South Korea (Gaon)	1
Japan (Oricon)	14
US World Albums (Billboard)	3

== Release history ==
Region	Date	Format	Label
Worldwide	June 15, 2015	Digital download	JYP Entertainment
South Korea	June 15, 2015	CD, digital download	JYP Entertainment
Japan	June 17, 2015	CD	JYP Entertainment
