= Genesis of 2PM =

- Regular edition cover

Studio album by 2PM
- Released: January 29, 2014
- Recorded: 2013
- Genres: J-pop; Dance-pop
- Length: 46:15
- Language: Japanese
- Label: Epic

2PM chronology
Grown (2013)	Genesis of 2PM (2014)	Go Crazy! (2014)

Singles from Genesis of 2PM
- 1. "Give Me Love" Released: May 29, 2013; 2. "Winter Games" Released: October 16, 2013

Genesis of 2PM is the third Japanese studio album and sixth album overall by South Korean boy band 2PM. It was released on January 29, 2014 by Epic Records Japan. The album debuted at number one on the Oricon Weekly Albums Chart.

== Release ==
Genesis of 2PM was released on January 29, 2014 as their first album release under Sony Music Japan sublabel Epic Records Japan in three editions:

- Regular edition: CD
- Limited Edition A: CD + DVD
- Limited Edition B: CD + CD

There are nine new tracks in this third Japanese studio album. Tracks from both Give Me Love and Winter Games are also included in this album.

== Track listing ==
All editions tracklist
No.	Title	Lyrics	Music	Arranger(s)	Length
1.	"Genesis"	Lee Woo Min “Collapsedone”	Lee Woo Min “Collapsedone”		1:10
2.	"Give Me Love"	Michael Yano, Natsumi Watanabe	M.I, NA.ZU.NA	M.I, NA.ZU.NA	3:59
3.	"Merry-go-round"	Wooyoung, Natsumi Watanabe, Garfunkel	Wooyoung, Hong Jisang	Hong Jisang	3:45
4.	"Winter Games"	Super Changddai, Natsumi Watanabe, Michael Yano	Super Changddai	Super Changddai	3:25
5.	"永遠～Lasting heart～"	Yu Shimoji, Michael Yano	Hong Jisang	Hong Jisang	3:21
6.	"Step by Step"	Faya, Jam9, Michael Yano	Paul Drew, Greig Watts, Joe Killington, Pete Barringer, Claire Rodrigues		3:26
7.	"Falling in love"	Jun. K, Faya, Michael Yano	Jun. K		3:38
8.	"Beat of Love"	Kenn Kato, Michael Yano	M.I, Na.Zu.Na		3:38
9.	"Only Girl"	Sim Eunji, Michael Yano, Shoko Fujibayashi	Sim Eunji		4:26
10.	"I Want You"	Junho, Hong Jisang, Risa Horie, Michael Yano	Junho, Hong Jisang		3:46
11.	"Stay Here"	Hong Jisang, Lee Woo Min “Collapsedone”, Natsumi Watanabe, Michael Yano	Hong Jisang, Lee Woo Min “Collapsedone”		3:23
12.	"Next Generation"	Yu Shimoji, Michael Yano	Kazuhiro Hara		4:28
13.	"Beautiful Day"	Kenn Kato, Michael Yano, Lee Woo Min “Collapsedone”	Lee Woo Min “Collapsedone”		3:50
Total length:					46:15

DVD (Limited Edition Ver. A)
No.	Title	Length
1.	"Prologue of Genesis"
2.	"Genesis of 2PM Making Movie"
3.	"2PM Arena Tour 2013 “Legend of 2PM” Document Movie"
4.	"Winter Games (Original ver.)"
5.	"Winter Games (Dance ver.)"

Bonus CD (Limited Edition Ver. B)
No.	Title	Length
1.	"Hey You" (Junho solo)
2.	"It’s Only You" (Taecyeon feat. Baek Ye-rin (15&))
3.	"Give Up" (Wooyoung solo)
4.	"So Wonderful" (Nichkhun solo)
5.	"Perfume" (香水) (Chansung solo)
6.	"No Love" (Jun. K solo)

== Release history ==
Country	Date	Format	Label
Japan	January 29, 2014	CD, Digital download	Epic Records Japan
South Korea	February 19, 2014	Digital download	JYP Entertainment

== Oricon charts ==
Oricon Albums Chart	Peak position	Debut sales (copies)
Weekly Chart	1	63,213
Daily Singles Chart	2	81,825
Weekly Singles Chart	2	137,755
