= Without U =

2010 single by 2PM

Single by 2PM

from the album Hands Up
- B-side: "Don't Stop Can't Stop"; "Maza"; "I Will Give You My Life"
- Released: April 19, 2010
- Recorded: 2009–2010
- Genre: K-pop; Dance-pop; R&B; hip hop
- Length: 21:09
- Label: JYP Entertainment
- Composers: J.Y. Park; Tommy Park
- Lyricist: J.Y. Park
- Producer: J.Y. Park (The Asiansoul)

2PM singles chronology
"Heartbeat" (2009)	"Without U" (2010)	"Thank You" (2010)

Music video
- "Without U" on YouTube

"Without U" is a song recorded by South Korean boy band 2PM. It is the title track of the group's single album Don't Stop Can't Stop, released on April 19, 2010 by JYP Entertainment. It was 2PM's first song to top the newly-launched Gaon Singles Chart, despite also being the group's first single since the controversial announcement that former member Jaebeom would not return to the group following the termination of his contract with JYP Entertainment.

== Background ==
"Without U" is a contemporary R&B song composed and written by J.Y. Park. The song combines piano instrumentation with the synthesizer. The lyrics of the song are from the perspective of a man who resolves to get over an ex-partner who broke his heart.

Two months prior to the release of "Without U", JYP Entertainment announced that Jaebeom would not return to 2PM following his hiatus due to controversy over his social media posts, as his contract with the company had been permanently terminated for an undisclosed reason, with the agreement of all 6 members. Following a combined fan meeting and press conference with the six remaining members of 2PM and JYP Entertainment CEO Choi Jungwook in attendance, various 2PM fansites were shut down and boycott movements were started as a protest of Jaebeom's termination.

Music industry insiders noted that the time between 2PM's previous album and their comeback with Don't Stop Can't Stop was notably shorter than their prior comebacks, being released just five months after 01:59PM. Several speculated it to be a strategic move to attempt to decisively move past the controversy over Jaebeom's departure surrounding the group since September 2009.

On April 14, 2010, pictures of the group's comeback were released. On April 16, 2PM released a teaser for the music video of "Without U" on YouTube. On April 19, Don't Stop Can't Stop was released digitally, along with the music video for "Without U". A music video for the B-side track "I Will Give You My Life" (목숨을 건다; also known as "My Life 4 U") was later released on June 10, 2010, primarily featuring behind-the-scenes content from the making of and the promotion for Don't Stop Can't Stop.

The track would later be included in 2PM's second studio album, Hands Up, released on June 20, 2011. A Japanese version of the song was included as the B-side track of 2PM's second Japanese single, "I'm Your Man", released on August 17, 2011.

== Music video ==
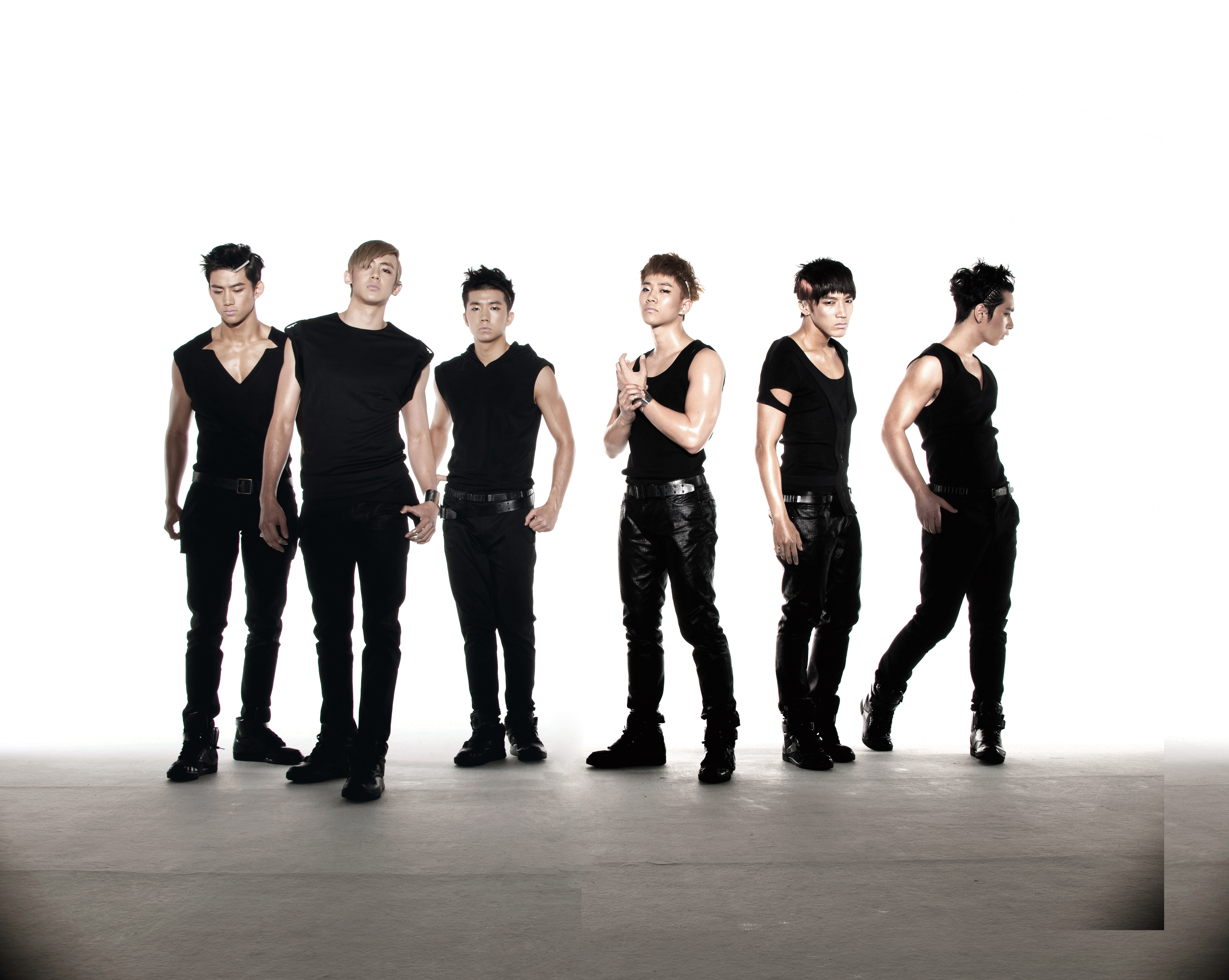
A teaser photoshoot of 2PM for "Without U".

The music video, filmed in either black-and-white or sepia tones, features the members dressed in sleeveless black tops and black skinny jeans dancing in heavy rain in dark, muddy sets designed to look like a ruined factory or empty alleyways.

== Promotion ==
2PM performed "Without U" for the first time on the April 22 episode of M Countdown. After accumulating a total of seven music show wins on M Countdown, Music Bank, and Inkigayo, 2PM also performed "Without U" and "Don't Stop Can't Stop" at the 2010 Dream Concert on May 22, as well as on the 100th episode of Kim Jung-eun's Chocolate which aired on May 29. 2PM then embarked on their first solo concerts titled Don't Stop Can't Stop, the same name as their single album, with shows in Seoul on July 31 and August 1, in Busan on August 7–8, and in Seoul again on September 4–5, where they performed tracks from Don't Stop Can't Stop.

== Reception ==
Upon the release of the single album, several netizens commented on how the lyrics of "Without U" and "Don't Stop Can't Stop" seemed to be a metaphor for the group moving on without Jaebeom, although JYP Entertainment stated the song was about a romantic relationship. Despite the controversy, several tracks on the single album charted on various music charts, with "Without U" topping the Gaon Singles Chart and Don't Stop Can't Stop topping the Gaon Album Chart.

== Track listing ==
All editions track listing
No.	Title	Lyrics	Music	Mixer	Length
1.	"Don't Stop Can't Stop"	J.Y. Park	J.Y. Park (The Asiansoul), Tommy Park	Mun Ho Yun (Moonworker)	4:09
2.	"Without U"	J.Y. Park	J.Y. Park, Tommy Park	Manny Marroquin, Christian Plata, Erik Madrid	3:21
3.	"Maza" (Korean: 마자; RR: maja)	Super Changddai	Super Changddai	Hong Seong Jun, Shim So Yeon	3:15
4.	"I Will Give You My Life" (Korean: 목숨을 건다; RR: moksumeul geonda)	Super Changddai	Super Changddai	Yang Gwang Ho, Kwon Hae Hun	3:08
5.	"Without U" (explorer mix)	J.Y. Park	Moonworker, Tommy Park, J.Y. Park	Moonworker, Tommy Park, The Asiansoul	4:00
6.	"Space Maza" (Korean: Space 마자; RR: Space maja)	Super Changddai	Super Changddai	Yoon Wong Won, Choi Ja Uk	3:17
Total length:					21:10

== Charts ==
Weekly chart performance for Don't Stop Can't Stop
Chart (2010)	Peak position	Ref.
South Korea (Gaon)	1	
Chart (2011)	Peak position	Ref.
South Korea (Gaon)	4	

Monthly chart performance for Don't Stop Can't Stop
Chart (2010)	Peak position	Ref.
South Korea (Gaon)	8	

Year-end chart performance for Don't Stop Can't Stop
Chart (2010)	Peak position	Ref.
South Korea (Gaon)	20	

Weekly chart performance for "Without U"
Chart (2010)	Peak position	Ref.
South Korea (Gaon)	1	
Chart (2011)	Peak position	Ref.
South Korea (Gaon)	85	

Monthly chart performance for "Without U"
Chart (2010)	Peak position	Ref.
South Korea (Gaon)	8	

Year-end chart performance for "Without U"
Chart (2010)	Peak position	Ref.
South Korea (Gaon)	50	

== Accolades ==
Music show wins
Program	Date	Ref.
M Countdown	April 29, 2010	
M Countdown	May 6, 2010	
M Countdown	May 13, 2010	
Music Bank	May 7, 2010	
Music Bank	May 14, 2010	
Inkigayo	May 16, 2010	
Inkigayo	May 23, 2010	

== Release history ==
Country	Release date	Format	Label	Ref.
South Korea	April 19, 2010	Digital download	JYP Entertainment	
South Korea	April 22, 2010	CD	JYP Entertainment	
Philippines	August 21, 2010	CD	PolyEast Records	
Thailand	December 14, 2010	CD	Sony Music Thailand	
