= Danny Majic =

Record producer

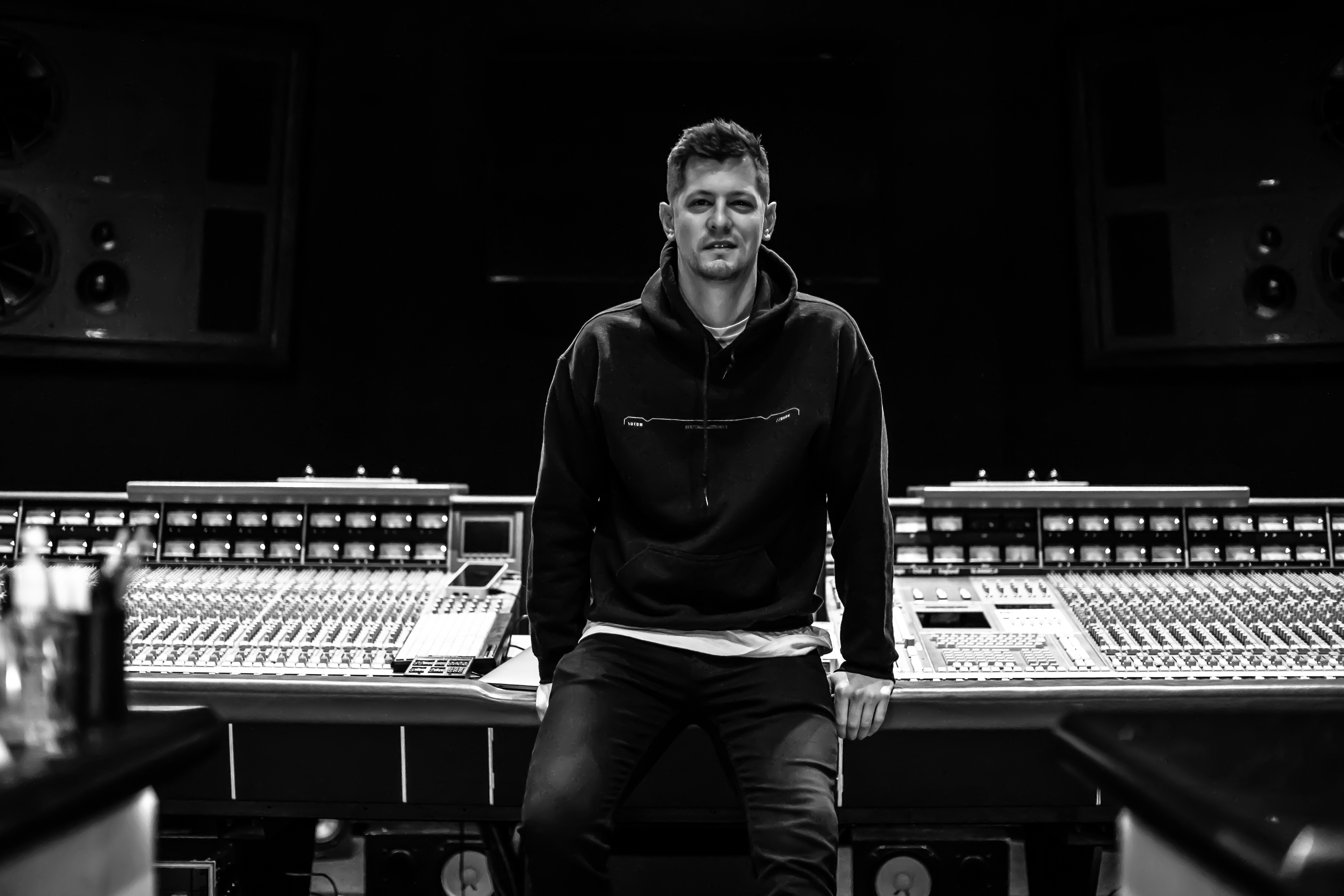

Background information
- Born: Daniel Majic
- Origin: San Mateo, California & Colorado, United States
- Genres: Pop, urban/rap, folk
- Years active: 2014−present
- Label: APG
- Website: www.dannymajic.com

Daniel Majic, or Danny Majic is a Croatian-American record producer based in Los Angeles, CA. Majic has produced and written songs for G-Eazy, OneRepublic, Eminem 2 Chainz, Lecrae, Calum Scott, Galantis, A Boogie wit da Hoodie, Galantis, David Guetta, Flo Rida, The Vamps and Ally Brooke.

== Production Discography ==
Title	Year	Artist	Album	Chart notes
"Go Crazy!"	2014	2PM	Go Crazy!	#5 Gaon Singles chart
"Watcha Gonna Do"	2014	Drop City Yacht Club	Non-album single	
"Lift Me Up"	2015	David Guetta (featuring Nico and Vinz and Ladysmith Black Mambazo)	Listen	#1 US Top Dance/Electronic Albums #4 US Billboard 200
"Feel's So Good"	2016	B.A.P	Non-album singles	
"Who's With Me"	2016	Flo Rida	Non-album singles	
"On My Own"	2016	Lecrae (featuring Leon Bridges)	Non-album singles	
"At Night"	2016	Flo Rida (featuring Liz Elias)	Non-album singles	
"All Night"	2016	The Vamps and Matoma	Non-album singles	BRIT Certified: PLATINUM; RIAA Certified: GOLD
"Home"	2016	Gnash		
"Cake"	2016	Flo Rida and 99 Percent	This is a Challenge	RIAA Certified: GOLD
"Carry On"	2017	Young Rising Sons	Non-album singles	
"Game Time"	2017	Flo Rida (featuring Sage the Gemini)	Non-album singles	
"Good Life"	2017	G-Eazy and Kehlani	The Fate of the Furious: The Album	RIAA Certified: GOLD
"I'll Find You"	2017	Lecrae (featuring Tori Kelly)	All Things Work Together	#1 Billboard Christian Songs; RIAA Certified: PLATINUM
"Dancer"	2018	Flo Rida	Non-album single	
"Start Again"	2018	OneRepublic (featuring Logic)	13 Reasons Why: Season 2	RIAA Certified: GOLD
"Need To Know"	2018	Calum Scott	[Only Human]	
"Bones"	2019	Galantis (featuring OneRepublic)	[Single]	RIAA Certified: GOLD
"The Least I Could Do"	2019	Plested	[Single]	
"Big Numbers"	2019	Sage The Gemini	Madden NFL 20 Soundtrack	
"Leave Me"	2019	Skizzy Mars (featuring Marc E. Bassy)	[Single]	
"Too Young"	2020	Louis Tomlinson	Walls	
"Drown" (featuring John Legend)	2020	Lecrae	Restoration (Lecrae album)	#1 US Christian Albums (Billboard)
"Bad Vibe"	2020	Quando Rondo featuring A Boogie wit da Hoodie and 2 Chainz)	Qpac	#22 Billboard 200
"Last One Standing"	2021	Skylar Grey featuring Polo G, Mozzy, and Eminem	Venom: Let There Be Carnage (Original Motion Picture Soundtrack)	
