= Beautiful (2PM song) =

- Regular edition cover

Single by 2PM

from the album Legend of 2PM
- B-side: "Kimi ga Ireba"
- Released: June 6, 2012
- Recorded: 2012
- Genre: J-pop; Dance-pop
- Length: 3:59
- Label: Ariola Japan
- Songwriters: Park Jin-young; Nice73; Natsumi Watanabe

2PM singles chronology
"Ultra Lover" (2011)	"Beautiful" (2012)	"One Day" (2012)

Music video
- "Beautiful" on YouTube

"Beautiful" is the fourth Japanese single by South Korean boy band 2PM. It was released on June 6, 2012 by Ariola Japan. The single received Gold certification status by the Recording Industry Association of Japan the same month as its release. A Korean version of the song was later released in 2014 as part of the group's fourth Korean studio album, Go Crazy!.

== Background and release ==
"Beautiful" is a Japanese song composed by J.Y. Park "The Asiansoul", Nice73 and Natsumi Watanabe. The B-side "Kimi ga Ireba" is an original Japanese song, composed by 2PM member Junho. This is the group's first single to include an original Japanese song as a B-side.

A ringtone version of the song was first used for 2PM's first Japanese commercial, for a black vinegar called Heukcho (흑초) by South Korean brand Sempio, which aired on April 17, 2012. The group then became the first Korean act to hold a six-show concert at the Nippon Budokan, titled Six "Beautiful" Days after the single, from May 24 to 31, 2012. They held an additional two shows at the Yokohama Arena on June 5 and 6.

The single was released simultaneously with the group's live DVD, Arena Tour 2011: "Republic of 2PM", on June 6, 2012, in 3 editions: CD+DVD, CD+Photobook and a Regular edition. It was later released in South Korea on June 20, 2012. A Korean version of the song was included in 2PM's studio album Go Crazy! (2014).

== Music video ==
A teaser of the music video was released on May 14, 2012 on 2PM's official Japanese website, and the full music video was released on May 22 on the Japanese TV network M-On!. The choreography of the song features a "mermaid dance" move that involves gyrating hips while leaning on chairs.

== Promotions ==
The group performed the song on Japanese television shows such as the June 2 episode of Music Fair and the June 10 episode of NHK's music program Music Japan, as well as at the 2012 MTV Video Music Awards Japan on June 23. In support of the release of "Beautiful", 2PM held "Hi Touch" fan events in Osaka on June 9 and in Tokyo on June 16.

== Commercial performance ==
"Beautiful" sold almost 150,000 copies within a week of its release, becoming the highest-selling single in the history of the Tower Records Shibuya location. The song peaked at number two on the Oricon Singles Chart, charting for a total of nine weeks. The song also peaked at number two on the Billboard Japan Hot 100, charting for two weeks.

== Track listing ==
CD+DVD and CD+Photobook track listing
No.	Title	Lyrics	Music	Length
1.	"Beautiful"	J.Y. Park "The Asiansoul"; Nice73; Natsumi Watanabe	J.Y. Park "The Asiansoul"	3:59
2.	"Kimi ga Ireba" (君がいれば; If You Are Here)	Mai Watarai; Nice73	Junho	3:39
3.	"Beautiful" (without main vocal)		J.Y. Park "The Asiansoul"	4:00
4.	"Kimi ga Ireba" (without main vocal)		Junho	3:36
Total length:				15:12

CD-only track listing
No.	Title	Lyrics	Music	Length
1.	"Beautiful"	J.Y. Park "The Asiansoul"; Nice73; Watanabe	J.Y. Park "The Asiansoul"	3:59
2.	"Kimi ga Ireba" (君がいれば; If You Are Here)	Watarai; Nice73	Junho	3:39
3.	"Beautiful" (Aqua Blu mix)	J.Y. Park "The Asiansoul"; Nice73; Watanabe	Aqua Blu; J.Y. Park "The Asiansoul"	3:46
4.	"Beautiful" (without main vocal)			4:00
5.	"Kimi ga Ireba" (without main vocal)			3:36
Total length:				18:57

DVD
No.	Title	Length
1.	"Beautiful" (music video)
2.	"Beautiful" (music video – dance version)

== Charts ==
=== Oricon ===
Oricon Chart	Peak	Debut sales	Sales total	Ref.
Daily Singles Chart	2	73,529	163,463	
Weekly Singles Chart	2	141,236	163,463	
Monthly Singles Chart	4	162,178	163,463	
Half-Year Singles Chart (2012)	29	141,236	163,463	
Yearly Singles Chart	47	163,463	163,463	

=== Other charts ===
Chart performance for "Beautiful"
Chart	Peak position	Ref.
Billboard Japan Hot 100	2	
Japan RIAJ Digital Track	32	
South Korea Gaon Weekly Singles (Note: Korean-language version)	118	
South Korea Gaon Weekly International Singles	4	
South Korea Gaon Monthly International Singles	21	

Chart performance for "Kimi ga Ireba"
Chart	Peak position	Ref.
Japan RIAJ Digital Track	65	
South Korea Gaon Weekly International Singles	100	

== Sales and certifications ==
Chart	Amount
RIAJ physical shipping certification	Gold (100,000+)

== Release history ==
Country	Date	Format	Label	Ref.
Japan	June 6, 2012	CD, Digital download	Ariola Japan	
South Korea	June 20, 2012	Digital download	JYP Entertainment	
