= Legend of 2PM =

- Regular edition cover

Studio album by 2PM
- Released: February 13, 2013
- Recorded: 2012–2013
- Genres: J-pop, dance-pop
- Length: 45:28
- Language: Japanese
- Label: Ariola Japan

2PM chronology
2PM Member's Selection (2012)	Legend of 2PM (2013)	Grown (2013)

Singles from Legend of 2PM
- 1. "Beautiful" Released: June 6, 2012; 2. "Masquerade" Released: November 14, 2012

Legend of 2PM is the second Japanese studio album (fourth album overall) by South Korean boy band 2PM. It was released on February 13, 2013, in three editions:

- Regular edition: CD
- Limited Edition A: CD + DVD
- Limited Edition B: CD + CD

There are nine new tracks in this second Japanese studio album. Tracks from both Beautiful and Masquerade are also included in this album. "This Is Love" and "So Bad" were released digitally via the iTunes Store on February 18–19, 2013, as a promotional single from the album.

== Track listing ==
All editions track list
No.	Title	Lyrics	Music	{{{extra_column}}}	Length
1.	"The Legend"				0:58
2.	"Masquerade" (マスカレード ～"Masquerade"～; "Masukarēdo"; album version)	PA-NON, Michael Yano	NA.ZU.NA, M.I		3:59
3.	"Beautiful"	J.Y. Park "The Asiansoul", Nice73, Natsumi Watanabe	J.Y. Park "The Asiansoul",		3:58
4.	"So Bad"	J.Y. Park "The Asiansoul", Natsumi Watanabe・Michael Yano	J.Y. Park "The Asiansoul",		3:25
5.	"Only One"	Natsumi Watanabe・Garfunkel	Hong Ji Sang		3:08
6.	"Missing You"	Dokebi Punch・PA-NON, Michael Yano	Dokebi Punch		3:12
7.	"Want You Back"	Dokebi Punch, PA-NON, Michael Yano	Dokebi Punch		4:07
8.	"This Is Love"	Lee Junho, Mai Watarai, Michael Yano	Lee Junho, Hong Ji Sang		4:06
9.	"Kimi ga Ireba" (君がいれば; "If You Are Here")	Mai Watarai, Nice73	Lee Junho		3:40
10.	"I'll Be OK"	Dokebi Punch, Chokkyu Murano, Michael Yano	Dokebi Punch	Dokebi Punch	3:35
11.	"SOS Man"	J.Y. Park "The Asiansoul", Kenn Kato, Garfunkel	J.Y. Park "The Asiansoul",		3:00
12.	"Breakthrough"	Yu Shimoji, NICE73	Kazuhiro Hara		3:49
13.	"Forever"	Lee Junho, Shin Bong-won, Mai Watarai	Lee Junho, Shin Bong-won		4:31
Total length:					45:28

Bonus track (regular edition only)
No.	Title	Lyrics	Music	Length
14.	"Hanarete Ite Mo" (離れていても; "Even When We're Apart"; live version)	Jun.K	Jun.K, Kenn Kato

DVD (limited edition ver. A)
No.	Title	Length
1.	"Prologue of LEGEND OF 2PM"
2.	"LEGEND OF 2PM making movie"
3.	"Members’ Solo Off Shot Movie Woo Young"
4.	"Members’ Solo Off Shot Movie Jun Ho"
5.	"Members’ Solo Off Shot Movie Taec Yeon"
6.	"Members’ Solo Off Shot Movie Chan Sung"
7.	"Members’ Solo Off Shot Movie Jun. K"
8.	"Members’ Solo Off Shot Movie Nick Khun"

Bonus CD (limited edition ver. B)
No.	Title	Length
1.	"Sexy Lady" (Woo-young solo)	3:52
2.	"Say Yes" (Jun-ho solo)	4:21
3.	"Kimidakeni" (君だけに; "Only You"; Taec-yeon solo)	3:34
4.	"Oh" (Chan-sung solo)	3:22
5.	"True Swag" (Jun. K solo)	4:17
6.	"Let It Rain" (Nichkhun solo)	3:32
Total length:		22:58

There is also PLAYBUTTON Limited Edition. It is released in 7 different editions. Each have the 13 tracks + 1 bonus track.

Bonus track (original version)
No.	Title	Length
14.	"Hanarete Ite Mo" (離れていても; "Even When We're Apart"; live version)

Bonus track (Woo-young version)
No.	Title	Length
14.	"Sexy Lady" (Woo-young solo)

Bonus track (Jun-ho version)
No.	Title	Length
14.	"Say Yes" (Jun-ho solo)

Bonus track (Taec-yeon version)
No.	Title	Length
14.	"Kimidakeni" (Taec-yeon solo)

Bonus track (Chan-sung version)
No.	Title	Length
14.	"Oh" (Chan-sung solo)

Bonus track (Jun. K version)
No.	Title	Length
14.	"True Swag" (Jun. K solo)

Bonus track (Nichkhun version)
No.	Title	Length
14.	"Let It Rain" (Nichkhun solo)

== Release history ==
Region	Date	Label
Japan	February 13, 2013	Ariola Japan
South Korea	March 13, 2013	JYP Entertainment
Malaysia	February 26, 2013	Sony Music Malaysia

== Chart positions ==
=== Weekly ===
Chart (2013)	Peak position
Japanese Albums (Oricon)	1

=== Year-end ===
Chart (2013)	Position
Japanese Albums (Oricon)	100
