= 2PM of 2PM =

Studio album by 2PM
- Released: April 15, 2015
- Genres: J-pop, dance-pop
- Length: 56:31
- Language: Japanese
- Label: Epic

2PM chronology
Go Crazy! (2014)	2PM of 2PM (2015)	No.5 (2015)

Singles from Genesis of 2PM
- 1. "Midaretemina" Released: September 17, 2014; 2. "Guilty Love" Released: January 28, 2015

2PM of 2PM is the fourth Japanese and eighth overall studio album by South Korean boy band 2PM. It was released on April 15, 2015, as their second album release under Sony Music Japan sub-label Epic Records Japan, in three editions:

- Regular edition: CD
- Limited edition A: CD + DVD
- Limited edition B: CD + CD

The album consists of thirteen tracks, including songs from Midaretemina and Guilty Love. The album debuted at number one on the Weekly Oricon Albums Chart. In 2016, it was awarded as one of the top three Asian albums (excluding releases by domestic artists) at the 30th Japan Gold Disc Awards.

On May 20, 2015, 2PM released the album as 2PM of 2PM (Repackage) with two editions:

- Regular edition: CD + new song "I Know"
- Limited edition A: CD + DVD

== Track listing ==
No.	Title	Length
1.	"Intro"	0:40
2.	"Midaretemina" (ミダレテミナ)	3:57
3.	"Guilty Love"	3:06
4.	"Sexy Ladies"	3:42
5.	"Everybody"	4:06
6.	"Fight"	3:07
7.	"Through The Fire"	3:53
8.	"Jam Session"	3:54
9.	"Slender Man"	3:20
10.	"Shiny Girl"	3:47
11.	"365"	3:44
12.	"Burning Love"	4:11
13.	"春風 ～Good-bye Again～ (Harukaze / Spring Breeze)"	4:16
Total length:		56:31

DVD (limited edition ver. A)
No.	Title	Length
1.	"Prologue of 2PM of 2PM"
2.	"2PM of 2PM" (making movie)
3.	"2PM Arena Tour 2014 “Genesis Of 2PM”" (Document Movie)
4.	"Midaretemina" (music video – close up ver.)
5.	"Guilty Love" (music video – close up ver.)
6.	"Guilty Love" (music video – dance ver.)

Bonus CD (limited edition ver. B)
No.	Title	Length
1.	"Crush" (Junho solo)	3:05
2.	"Miss Wonderful" (Nichkhun solo)	3:11
3.	"WHPH" (Jun. K solo)	2:55
4.	"チョコレート (Chocolate) feat. Yerin (15&)" (Taecyeon solo)	3:17
5.	"僕は (Boku wa / I am)" ((Chansung solo)	3:43
6.	"THE BLUE LIGHT" (Wooyoung solo)	4:12
Total length:		20:22

2PM of 2PM (Repackage)
No.	Title	Length
14.	"I Know"	5:03
Total length:		1:01:34

2PM of 2PM (Repackage) DVD track listing (limited edition)
No.	Title	Length
1.	"2PM Hottest Japan New Year's Party 2015 "Old Boy vs Young Boy""

== Release history ==
Country	Date	Format	Label
Japan	April 15, 2015	CD, Digital download	Epic Records Japan
South Korea		Digital download	JYP Entertainment

== Oricon charts ==
Release	Oricon Albums Chart	Peak position	Debut sales (copies)
April 15, 2015	Weekly Chart	1	62,705+
