= Masquerade (2PM song) =

- Regular edition cover

Single by 2PM

from the album Legend of 2PM
- B-side: "Forever"
- Released: November 14, 2012
- Recorded: 2012
- Genre: J-pop; Dance-pop
- Length: 3:52
- Label: Ariola Japan
- Composers: NA.ZU.NA; M.I
- Lyricists: PA-NON; Michael Yano

2PM singles chronology
"One Day" (2012)	"Masquerade" (2012)	"Comeback When You Hear This Song" (2013)

Music video
- "Masquerade" on YouTube

"Masquerade" (Japanese: マスカレード ～Masquerade～, Hepburn: Masukarēdo) is the fifth Japanese single by the South Korean boy band 2PM. It was released on November 14, 2012 in three different editions.

== Background and release ==
The single was originally scheduled to be released on August 29, 2012, with an initial track list made up of "Masquerade" and two original Japanese songs, "Stay Here", a B-side track, and "Falling in Love", a composition by 2PM member Jun. K included as a bonus track. However, due to the controversy surrounding 2PM member Nichkhun's car accident in South Korea on July 29, 2012, the single's release was postponed. On October 5, following the announcement of the end of Nichkhun's hiatus, a note on 2PM's Japanese website revealed that the single would be released in mid-November with a different track list.

On October 15, the jacket covers of the single were re-announced and a new CD track list was revealed. It was also revealed that the original songs that were supposed to be on the single, "Stay Here" and "Falling in Love", would be included in future releases by the group. The single was released on November 14, 2012 in three different editions: a regular edition and two CD + DVD editions.

== Composition ==
"Masquerade" is a dance-pop song about a forbidden romance and desiring a woman, with a melancholic tone. "Forever", the single's B-side, is a ballad co-written and co-composed by member Junho. The CD-only edition includes a remix of "Masquerade" by ArmySlick as a bonus track.

== Music video ==
A teaser of the music video was revealed on July 17, 2012 on 2PM's Japanese website. The music video prematurely premiered on MTV Japan on August 21; MTV Japan later apologized for unintentionally airing the music video on August 23.

The music video, directed by Jang Jae-hyeok, is shot in black-and-white and received attention for its "mask dance" choreography, in which the members remove and reattach masks on their face and shoulders through the use of magnets. Taecyeon does not appear in the choreography scenes of the music video due to an arm injury sustained on May 15, 2012.

== Promotion ==
On the date of the release of "Masquerade", 2PM appeared on Yahoo! Live Talk, a live streamed fan event with games and Q&A segments. Advertisements for the single were run in Omote-sandō Station in Tokyo for a week, starting on November 19, 2012. In promotion of the release of the single, 2PM held a fan event on November 24, 2012 at Pacifico Yokohama titled 2PM Forever with an audience of 20,000 fans, where they first performed the B-side song "Forever". In addition, they held a "Hi Touch" fan event the next day, also at Pacifico Yokohama. "Masquerade" was also used as the opening theme song for Nippon Television's music program Happy Music for the month of November.

== Commercial performance ==
"Masquerade" and "Forever" were both pre-released as ringtones, with "Masquerade" topping various domestic ringtone charts such as RecoChoku. The single peaked at number two on the Oricon Singles Chart, charting for five weeks. "Masquerade" also peaked at number two on the Billboard Japan Hot 100, charting for two weeks. The single was certified Gold by the Recording Industry Association of Japan in November 2012 for selling over 100,000 copies.

== Track listing ==
CD+DVD and CD+photobook track list
No.	Title	Lyrics	Music	Length
1.	"Masquerade" (マスカレード ～Masquerade～; Masukarēdo)	PA-NON; Michael Yano	NA.ZU.NA; M.I	3:52
2.	"Forever"	Junho; Shin Bong-won; Mai Watarai	Junho; Shin	4:36
3.	"Masquerade" (instrumental)		NA.ZU.NA; M.I	3:49
4.	"Forever" (instrumental)		Junho; Shin	4:32
Total length:				16:46

CD-only and digital bonus track
No.	Title	Lyrics	Music	Length
1.	"Masquerade" (マスカレード ～Masquerade～; Masukarēdo)	PA-NON; Michael Yano	NA.ZU.NA; M.I	3:52
2.	"Forever"	Junho; Shin; Watarai	Junho; Shin	4:36
3.	"Masquerade" (ArmySlick's bavtronic mix)	PA-NON; Michael Yano	NA.ZU.NA; M.I; ArmySlick	4:22
4.	"Masquerade" (instrumental)		NA.ZU.NA; M.I	3:49
5.	"Forever" (instrumental)		Junho; Shin	4:32
Total length:				21:07

DVD (limited edition type A)
No.	Title	Length
1.	"Masquerade" (music video)
2.	"Masquerade" (music video – dance ver.)

DVD (limited edition type B)
No.	Title	Length
1.	"Masquerade" (music video)
2.	"Masquerade" (music video — off-shot movie)

== Charts ==
=== Oricon ===
Oricon Chart	Peak	Debut sales	Sales total	Ref.
Daily Singles Chart	2	88,166	151,227+	
Weekly Singles Chart	2	130,242	151,227+	
Monthly Singles Chart	4	150,736	151,227+	
Yearly Singles Chart	52	151,227	151,227+	

=== Other charts ===
Chart	Peak position	Ref.
Billboard Japan Hot 100	2	

== Release history ==
Country	Date	Format	Label	Ref.
Japan	October 22, 2012	Digital download ("Masquerade" only)	Ariola Japan	
Japan	November 14, 2012	Digital download, CD, CD + DVD	Ariola Japan	
South Korea	December 6, 2012	Digital download	JYP Entertainment	
