= Hands Up (album) =

2011 studio album by 2PM

Studio album by 2PM
- Released: June 20, 2011
- Recorded: 2010–11
- Genres: Electronic; R&B; hip-hop
- Length: 48:25
- Label: JYP
- Producer: Park Jin-young

2PM chronology
All About 2PM (2011)	Hands Up (2011)	Republic of 2PM (2011)

Singles from HANDS UP
- 1. "Without U" Released: April 19, 2010; 2. "Thank You" Released: August 17, 2010; 3. "I'll Be Back" Released: October 11, 2010; 4. "Hands Up" Released: June 20, 2011

Hands Up is the second studio album by South Korean boy band, 2PM. The album was released in digital format on June 20, 2011 and in physical format on June 21, 2011. A special limited edition was released on June 23, 2011. Hands Up was 2PM's first album to include tracks written and composed by the group's members.

== Background ==
A teaser for the music video of "Hands Up", the lead single of their album, was released on June 15, 2011 on 2PM's official YouTube account. The full music video was released on June 20, 2011 along with the album Hands Up. The physical version of the album was released the next day.

The album contains thirteen tracks, including their 2010 single "Thank You" and songs from their previous single album Don't Stop Can't Stop and previous EP Still 02:00PM. Hands Up was 2PM's first album to include songs written and composed by the members, with "Give It to Me" and "Hot" being written and composed by Junho and Jun. K respectively. These two songs were pre-released as ringtones and ringback tones on July 16, 2011; "Hot" was originally written and performed at a fan-meeting in 2009 with a different arrangement and lyrics.

On July 15, 2011, 2PM released a music video for the remix version of "Hands Up" by South Korean DJ East4A. Two music videos for "Give It to Me" and "Hot" were later released on July 19 and July 25 respectively to promote the movie Blind.

2PM promoted the album with performances of "Hands Up" and the B-side track "Like a Movie" on Korean television music programs starting on June 24, 2011. After one month, they ended promotions for Hands Up in late July to focus on advertising promotions in Thailand, the release of their first Japanese studio album titled Republic of 2PM, and their Hands Up Asia Tour starting in September, the group's first concert tour spanning multiple countries.

The Japanese edition of the album include a 24-page photo book.

== Track listing ==
No.	Title	Lyrics	Music	Arrangements	Length
1.	"Hands Up"	Park Jin-young	Park Jin-young	Park Jin-young	3:18
2.	"Electricity"	Park Jin-young	Park Jin-young	Tommy Park	3:52
3.	"Give It To Me"	Junho	Junho; Hong Ji-sang	Hong	3:38
4.	"Like a Movie" (Korean: 영화처럼; RR: Yeonghwacheoreom)	Chance	Chance	Chance	4:20
5.	"Don't You Know" (Korean: 모르니; RR: Moreuni)	Hong	Hong	Hong	3:45
6.	"Hot"	Jun. K	Jun. K	Chance	3:30
7.	"Without U"	Park Jin-young	Park Jin-young	Park Jin-young	3:20
8.	"I'll Be Back"	Park Jin-young	Park Jin-young	Park Jin-young; Fame-J; Shim Eun-ji	3:37
9.	"I Can't"	Ra.D	Ra.D	Ra.D	3:25
10.	"Hands Up" (East4A mix)	Park Jin-young	Park Jin-young	East4A	3:30
11.	"Electricity" (220v mix)	Park Jin-young	Park Jin-young	Hong Ji-sang	4:06
12.	"Thank You"	Park Jin-young	Park Jin-young	Tommy Park	3:58
13.	"Don't Stop Can't Stop"	Park Jin-young	Park Jin-young	Park Jin-young; Tommy Park	4:08
Total length:					48:25

Bonus track
No.	Title	Lyrics	Music	Arrangements	Length
14.	"Hands Up" (Clean ver.)	Park Jin-young	Park Jin-young	Park Jin-young	3:17
Total length:					51:42

Taiwan edition DVD
No.	Title	Length
1.	"Hands Up" (music video)
2.	"I'll Be Back" (music video)

== Charts and sales ==
=== Weekly charts ===
Chart (2011)	Peak position
South Korea (Gaon)	1
Japan (Oricon)	17
Chart (2012)	Peak position
South Korea (Gaon)	9
Chart (2013)	Peak position
South Korea (Gaon)	19

=== Monthly charts ===
Chart (2011)	Peak position
South Korea (Gaon)	2
Japan (Oricon)	47
Chart (2012)	Peak position
South Korea (Gaon)	41
Chart (2013)	Peak position
South Korea (Gaon)	99

=== Year-end charts ===
Chart (2011)	Peak position
South Korea (Gaon)	12

=== Sales ===
Chart	Sales
Gaon physical sales	117,005+
Oricon sales	26,039

== Release history ==
Country	Date	Format	Label	Ref.
South Korea	June 20, 2011	Digital download	JYP Entertainment, LOEN Entertainment	
South Korea	June 21, 2011	CD	JYP Entertainment, LOEN Entertainment	
Taiwan	August 1, 2011	CD	Universal Music Taiwan	
Japan	August 17, 2011	CD	Ariola Japan	
Philippines	September 24, 2011	CD	PolyEast Records	
Indonesia	October 29, 2011	CD	Warner Music Indonesia	
South Korea	March 22, 2013	Re-issue (KMP edition)	JYP Entertainment, KMP Holdings	
