= Galaxy of 2PM =

- Regular edition cover

Studio album by 2PM
- Released: April 27, 2016
- Genres: J-pop; dance-pop
- Language: Japanese
- Label: Epic Records Japan

2PM chronology
No.5 (2015)	Galaxy of 2PM (2016)	Gentlemen's Game (2016)

Singles from Galaxy of 2PM
- 1. "Higher" Released: October 21, 2015

Galaxy of 2PM is the fifth Japanese studio album by South Korean boy band 2PM. It was released on April 27, 2016 in five editions:

- Regular edition: CD
- Limited edition A: CD + DVD
- Limited edition B (Jun. K x Taecyeon edition): CD + bonus tracks
- Limited edition C (Nichkhun x Wooyoung Edition): CD + bonus tracks
- Limited edition D (Junho x Chansung edition): CD + bonus tracks

The regular edition consists of 12 tracks, including tracks from 2PM's previous Japanese single, "Higher". The album debuted at number one on the Weekly Oricon Albums Chart. In May 2016, Galaxy of 2PM became the group's first studio album to be certified Gold by the Recording Industry Association of Japan for selling over 100,000 copies. In 2017, it was awarded as one of the top three Asian albums (excluding releases by domestic artists) at the 31st Japan Gold Disc Awards.

On June 15, 2016, 2PM released the album as Galaxy of 2PM (Repackage) in two editions:

- Regular edition: CD + new song "Milky Way ~Galaxy~"
- Limited edition: CD + DVD

== Track listing ==
Track list
No.	Title	Lyrics	Music	Arrangements	Length
1.	"The Galaxy"		Min Lee "collapsedone"	Min Lee "collapsedone"	1:25
2.	"Try Your Imagination" (想像してみて; Souzoushitemite)	Wooyoung, Frants, Shoko Fujibayashi	Wooyoung, Frants	Frants	3:16
3.	"Party Monster"	Yhanael	Damon Sharpe, Jimmy Burney, Drew Ryan Scott, Ichiro Suezawa	Damon Sharpe, Jimmy Burney, Drew Ryan Scott, Ichiro Suezawa	3:05
4.	"Talk About Your Love"	Yu Shimoji, Michael Yano	Kazuhiro Hara	Kazuhiro Hara	4:15
5.	"My House" (Japanese ver.)	Jun. K	Jun. K, Lel	Lel	3:10
6.	"Freeze"	Ragoon IM, Teria IM, Yhanael	Ragoon IM, Teria IM	Ryan IM, Ragoon IM, Teria IM	3:40
7.	"Don't Forget" (忘れないで; Wasurenaide)	Taecyeon aka TY, Raphael, Risa Horie	Taecyeon aka TY, Raphael	Raphael	4:01
8.	"Higher"	Jun. K, Kyasu Morizuk, Simon	Jun. K, Lel	Lel	3:04
9.	"Teaser"	Taecyeon aka TY, Raphael, Kenko-p	Taecyeon aka TY, Raphael	Raphael	3:37
10.	"Shining Star"	Chansung, Super Changddai, Risa Horie	Chansung, Super Changddai	Super Changddai	3:51
11.	"Set Me Free"	Junho, Hong Jisang, Yu Shimoji	Junho, Hong Jisang	Junho, Hong Jisang	3:25
12.	"The Time We Have Spent Together" (一緒に過ごした時間; Issho ni Sugoshita Jikan)	Junho, Hong Jisang, Natsumi Watanabe	Junho, Hong Jisang	Hong Jisang	5:11
Total length:					42:00

DVD (limited edition ver. A)
No.	Title	Length
1.	"Galaxy of 2PM" (prologue)
2.	"Galaxy of 2PM" (making movie)
3.	"Six Higher Days" (document movie)
4.	"Higher" (making movie)
5.	"The Time We Have Spent Together" (music video)

Bonus tracks (limited edition ver. B - Jun. K x Taecyeon edition)
No.	Title	Length
13.	"50 50" (Jun. K rap ver.)	3:29
14.	"50 50" (Taecyeon rap ver.)	3:29
15.	"50 50" (instrumental)	3:29

Bonus tracks (limited edition ver. C – Nichkhun x Wooyoung edition)
No.	Title	Length
13.	"彼女 (Kanojo)"	4:48
14.	"彼女 (Kanojo)" (instrumental)	4:48

Bonus tracks (limited edition ver. D - Junho x Chansung edition)
No.	Title	Length
13.	"Versus"	3:18
14.	"Versus" (instrumental)	3:18

Galaxy of 2PM (repackaged edition)
No.	Title	Length
13.	"天の川 ～Galaxy～ (Milky Way ~Galaxy~)"	3:55
Total length:		45:55

Galaxy of 2PM (repackaged edition) DVD track list (limited edition)

Disc 1
No.	Title	Tracks	Length
1.	"2PM Six 'Higher' Days" (member’s solo live Chansung)	Wanna Love You Again; Miss You; I Am (僕は; Boku wa); Boyfriend; Mine
2.	"2PM Six 'Higher' Days" (member’s solo live Junho)	Crush; Insane; Turn It Up; So Many Girls; So Good; Don't Tease Me
3.	"2PM Six 'Higher' Days" (member’s solo live Wooyoung)	R.O.S.E; Cocktail; Hanpa Nai (ハンパない); Happy Birthday; Give Up

Disc 2
No.	Title	Tracks	Length
1.	"2PM Six 'Higher' Days" (member’s solo live Taecyeon)	I Love U, U Love Me; Marriage Blue Part 2; Traición; Slender Man; Never Give Up
2.	"2PM Six 'Higher' Days" (member’s solo live Nichkhun)	Maybe You Are; Let It Rain; So Wonderful; Miss Wonderful; My Valentine
3.	"2PM Six 'Higher' Days" (member’s solo live Jun. K)	No Love; True Swag; No Goodbyes; Love & Hate; Everest

== Release history ==
Country	Date	Format	Label
Japan	April 27, 2016	CD, Digital download	Epic Records Japan
South Korea	August 25, 2016	Digital download	JYP Entertainment, KT Music

== Charts ==
=== Oricon ===
Oricon chart	Peak	Debut sales	Sales total
Daily Album Chart	1	49,992	122,685+
Weekly Album Chart	1	95,871	122,685+
Monthly Album Chart	5	95,871	122,685+
Half-Year Album Chart	20	105,668	122,685+
Yearly Album Chart	36	122,685	122,685+

=== Other charts ===
Chart	Peak position
Billboard Japan Hot Albums	1
Billboard Japan Top Album Sales	1

== Certifications ==
Chart	Amount
RIAJ physical shipping certification	Gold (100,000+)
