= Comeback When You Hear This Song =

2013 single by 2PM

Single by 2PM

from the album Grown
- Released: May 6, 2013
- Recorded: 2013
- Genre: K-pop; Electropop; R&B
- Length: 3:38
- Label: JYP
- Songwriters: Park Jin-young; Ok Taec-yeon
- Producer: Park Jin-young

2PM singles chronology
"Masquerade" (2012)	"Comeback When You Hear This Song" (2013)	"A.D.T.O.Y." (2013)

Music video
- "Comeback When You Hear This Song" on YouTube

"Comeback When You Hear This Song" (Korean: 이 노래를 듣고 돌아와; RR: I noraereul deutgo dorawa) is a song recorded by South Korean boy group 2PM. It is one of two title tracks for their studio album Grown, released by JYP Entertainment on May 6, 2013.

== Background and release ==
On April 29, 2013, JYP Entertainment revealed the title and track list of 2PM's third studio album, Grown, which would feature a double title track: "Comeback When You Hear This Song" and "A.D.T.O.Y." On May 6, 2013, 2PM released the music video for "Comeback When You Hear This Song" and digitally released the album Grown, minus the second title track, "A.D.T.O.Y."

A Japanese version of the song with the title "Kono uta o kiite modotte kit" (この歌を聴いて戻ってきて) was released as a bonus track for the group's Japanese single "Winter Games" on October 16, 2013.

== Composition ==
"Comeback When You Hear This Song" is an electropop song with R&B elements written and composed by JYP Entertainment founder Park Jin-young, with the rap section co-written by 2PM member Ok Taec-yeon. The song composed in the key C major at a rate of 125 beats per minute and with a running time of 3 minutes and 38 seconds. "Comeback When You Hear This Song" is written from the perspective of a man who regrets a breakup. In contrast to the more masculine and "sexy" "A.D.T.O.Y.", "Comeback When You Hear This Song" portrays a "younger" image of 2PM.

== Music video ==
The music video of "Comeback When You Hear This Song", starring model Stephanie Lee, features a motif of the seven deadly sins. It switches between individual scenes of each member in various sets inside or around a building, either losing their love interest or apologizing to her, and choreography scenes with the members dancing on top of a rooftop behind a giant stereo. The choreography of the song was created by foreign choreographers who did not understand the lyrics of the song, primarily featuring beckoning hand gestures and clapping.

== Promotion ==
2PM first performed "Comeback When You Hear This Song" on their comeback special, 2PM Returns, aired on MBC on May 12, 2013. On May 16, 2PM held their first comeback stage for the song on Mnet's M Countdown; they promoted the song for two weeks. On May 24, "Comeback When You Hear This Song" topped the Music Bank K-Chart.

== Charts ==
=== Weekly charts ===
Chart (2013)	Peak position
South Korea (Gaon)	7
Gaon Streaming Singles Chart	15
Gaon Download Singles Chart	3
Gaon BGM Chart	9
Gaon Mobile Ringtone Chart	38
South Korea (K-pop Hot 100)	16
US World Digital Songs (Billboard)	5

=== Monthly charts ===
Chart (May 2013)	Peak position
South Korea (Gaon)	15

== Accolades ==
Music program awards
Program	Date	Ref.
Music Bank	May 24, 2013	

== Sales ==
Country	Sales
South Korea (digital)	512,972

== Release history ==
Release history for "Comeback When You Hear This Song"
Region	Date	Format	Label
Various	May 6, 2013	Digital download	JYP
