= Grown (album) =

Studio album by 2PM
- Released: May 6, 2013
- Recorded: 2012–13
- Genres: Electronic; R&B; hip hop
- Length: 44:48
- Label: JYP
- Producer: The Asiansoul

2PM chronology
| Legend of 2PM (2013) | Grown (2013) | Genesis of 2PM (2014) |

Singles from Grown
- 1. "Comeback When You Hear This Song" Released: May 6, 2013; 2. "A.D.T.O.Y." Released: May 11, 2013

Grown is the third Korean and fifth overall studio album by South Korean boy band 2PM. The album was released digitally on May 6, 2013 and physically on May 13, 2013 by JYP Entertainment. A repackaged edition with ten new tracks, titled Grown (Grand Edition), was released digitally on June 19, 2013 and physically on June 25, 2013.

== Background ==
Grown was 2PM's first Korean release in a year, since their 2012 compilation album 2PM Member's Selection, and their first new Korean release in almost two years, since their 2011 studio album Hands Up. On April 29, 2013, JYP Entertainment revealed the title and track list of 2PM's third studio album, Grown, which would feature a double title track: "Comeback When You Hear This Song" and "A.D.T.O.Y." A teaser for the music video of "Comeback When You Hear This Song" was released on May 2, 2013 on the 2PM's official YouTube account. The full music video was released on May 6, along with 10 other songs from the album. The twelfth track, "A.D.T.O.Y.", and its music video were released on May 11. The album was physically released on May 13, with part of the album's profits being donated to charity.

The album was rereleased on June 19, 2013 with ten new songs, including self-composed solo tracks by each member and the title track "Please Call My Name" (내 이름을 불러줘), a song with lyrics written by a fan chosen in a contest in a collaboration with Daum titled "Write the Lyrics When You Hear This Song". The contest ran from May 27 to June 2, 2013, with the winner being announced on June 10.

== Promotion ==
On May 2, 2013, 2PM recorded a special comeback television special at the MBC Ilsan Dream Center Public Hall. The special, titled 2PM Returns, aired on May 12 on MBC at 00:30 KST and featured the group's first performances of several songs from Grown, including "Comeback When You Hear This Song", "A.D.T.O.Y.", and "At Times" (문득), a Korean version of their 2011 Japanese song, "Hanarete Itemo" (離れていても, Even When We're Apart), originally released in Republic of 2PM.

As part of their promotion activities for the album, from May 2 to July 31, 2013, the group took part in the 2PM G+Star Zone exhibition, at Apgujeongrodeo station. It is part of the G+Dream Project by Gangnam-gu Office for disadvantaged youth. Furthermore, on May 17, 2PM held a surprise live showcase at the Gangnam Station's M Stage titled 2PM Is Back with Genie, which was also live-streamed on JYP Entertainment's YouTube channel.

The group made their first promotional appearance for the album on Mnet's M Countdown on May 16, 2013; they promoted "Comeback When You Hear This Song" for two weeks and "A.D.T.O.Y." for five weeks.

== Track listing ==
All editions track listing
| No. | Title | Lyrics | Music | Arrangements | Length |
|---|---|---|---|---|---|
| 1. | "A.D.T.O.Y." (하.니.뿐.; Ha.ni.ppun.) | J.Y. Park; Taecyeon | J.Y. Park | The Asiansoul | 4:06 |
| 2. | "Comeback When You Hear This Song" (이 노래를 듣고 돌아와; I noraereul deutgo dorawa) | J.Y. Park; Taecyeon | J.Y. Park | The Asiansoul | 3:36 |
| 3. | "Zero Point" (원점으로; Wonjeomeuro) | Hong Ji-sang; Junho | Hong; Junho | Hong | 3:42 |
| 4. | "I’m Sorry" | Dokebi; Taecyeon | Dokebi | Dokebi; Jung Min-hyung | 3:07 |
| 5. | "The First Date" (오늘부터 1일; Oneulbuteo 1il) | Yeom Dong-geon; RP-T; 17HOLIC | Yeom | Yeom | 3:09 |
| 6. | "Dangerous" | Ryan IM | Ryan IM | Ryan IM; Moon Chang-gyoo | 3:14 |
| 7. | "One More Day" (오늘 하루만; Oneul haruman) | Shim Eun-ji; Taecyeon | Shim | Shim | 4:15 |
| 8. | "Game Over" | Park Jang-geun; Ham Jun-seok; Chance; Jun. K | Park; Ham; Chance; Jun. K | Duble Sidekick; Chance | 3:44 |
| 9. | "Coming Down" | Chansung; Taecyeon | east4A | east4A | 3:43 |
| 10. | "Go Back" (고백) | Hong; Junho; Taecyeon | Hong; Junho | Hong | 3:36 |
| 11. | "Love Song" | Hong; Junho | Hong; Junho | Hong | 4:03 |
| 12. | "At Times" (문득; Mundeuk) | Jun. K | Jun. K | Lei; Shim | 4:33 |
| Total length: | | | | | 44:48 |

Bonus CD (Grand Edition only)
| No. | Title | Lyrics | Music | Arrangements | Length |
|---|---|---|---|---|---|
| 1. | "Traición" (performed by Taecyeon) | Taecyeon | Taecyeon | Geol | 4:19 |
| 2. | "I'm In Love" (performed by Junho) | Junho | Hong; Junho | Hong | 3:21 |
| 3. | "This is Love" (performed by Wooyoung) | Wooyoung | Hong; Wooyoung; Jae-sung | Wooyoung | 3:01 |
| 4. | "Perfume" (향수; Hyangsu) (performed by Chansung) | Chansung | Jeong-ho | Jeong-ho; Storyteller | 3:42 |
| 5. | "Let It Rain" (performed by Nichkhun) | Nichkhun | Hong; Nichkhun | Hong | 3:32 |
| 6. | "True Swag" (performed by Jun. K) | Jun. K | Jun. K; Super Changddai | Jun. K; Super Changddai | 3:45 |
| 7. | "It's Time" (performed by Taecyeon feat. San E and Yubin) | Taecyeon; San E; Yubin | Taecyeon | Fame-J | 3:37 |
| 8. | "Just a Feeling" (performed by Junho) | Junho | Junho | Junho | 2:57 |
| 9. | "Love U Down" (performed by Chansung) | Dokkaebi | Dokkaebi | Dokkaebi | 3:25 |
| 10. | "Please Call My Name" (내 이름을 불러줘; Nae ireumeul bulleojwo) | Ahn Jung-yeon; Taecyeon | Taecyeon | Super Changddai; Minigun | 3:51 |
| Total length: | | | | | 35:30 |

DVD Malaysia edition
| No. | Title | Length |
|---|---|---|
| 1. | "Comeback When You Hear This Song MV" |
| 2. | "A.D.T.O.Y. MV" |
| 3. | "Grown Album Trailer" |
| 4. | "Comeback When You Hear This Song Jacket Making Video" |
| 5. | "Comeback When You Hear This Song MV Making Video" |
| 6. | "A.D.T.O.Y. Jacket Making Video" |
| 7. | "A.D.T.O.Y. MV Making Video" |

== Charts and sales ==
=== Weekly charts ===
Weekly chart performance for Grown
| Chart (2013) | Peak position |
|---|---|
| South Korea (Gaon) | 1 |
| Japan (Oricon) | 10 |
| US World Albums (Billboard) | 6 |
| Chart (2014) | Peak position |
| South Korea (Gaon) | 51 |

Weekly chart performance for Grown (Grand Edition)
| Chart (2013) | Peak position |
|---|---|
| South Korea (Gaon) | 1 |
| Chart (2014) | Peak position |
| South Korea (Gaon) | 41 |

=== Monthly charts ===
Monthly chart performance for Grown
| Chart (2013) | Peak position |
|---|---|
| South Korea (Gaon) | 2 |

Monthly chart performance for Grown (Grand Edition)
| Chart (2013) | Peak position |
|---|---|
| South Korea (Gaon) | 8 |

=== Year-end charts ===
Year-end chart performance for Grown
| Chart (2013) | Peak position |
|---|---|
| South Korea (Gaon) | 18 |

Year-end chart performance for Grown (Grand Edition)
| Chart (2013) | Peak position |
|---|---|
| South Korea (Gaon) | 68 |

=== Sales ===
| Chart | Sales |
|---|---|
| Gaon (physical) | 116,776+ (Grown) |
| Gaon (physical) | 23,336+ (Grown Grand Edition) |

== Release history ==
| Country | Version | Date | Format | Label |
|---|---|---|---|---|
| South Korea | Version A | May 6, 2013 | Digital download | JYP Entertainment, KT Music |
| South Korea | Version A | May 13, 2013 | CD, CD + DVD | JYP Entertainment, KT Music |
| South Korea | Version B | May 11, 2013 | Digital download | JYP Entertainment, KT Music |
| South Korea | Version B | May 23, 2013 | CD, CD + DVD | JYP Entertainment, KT Music |
| South Korea | Grand Edition | June 19, 2013 | Digital download | JYP Entertainment, KT Music |
| South Korea | Grand Edition | June 25, 2013 | CD | JYP Entertainment, KT Music |
| Taiwan | Taiwan Version | June 14, 2013 | CD + DVD | Universal Music Taiwan |
| Malaysia | Version A | May 31, 2013 | CD, CD + DVD | JYP Entertainment |
| Malaysia | Version B | June 29, 2013 | CD, CD + DVD | JYP Entertainment |
| Malaysia | Asia Version | July 25, 2013 | CD, CD + DVD | Warner Music Malaysia |
| Thailand | Thailand Version | August 8, 2013 | CD + DVD | GMM Grammy |
