= Go Crazy! (song) =

2014 single by 2PM

- Japanese single cover

Single by 2PM

from the album Go Crazy!
- B-side: "Fight"
- Released: September 15, 2014; September 17, 2014 (Japan)
- Recorded: 2014
- Genre: K-pop; J-pop; Dance-pop
- Length: 3:59; 4:03 (Japan)
- Label: JYP; Epic Records Japan
- Songwriter: Jun. K
- Producers: Jun. K; Danny Majic; Glen Choi; Fingazz; Dustin Tavella

2PM singles chronology
"Winter Games" (2013)	"Go Crazy!" (2014)	"Guilty Love" (2015)

Music video
- "Go Crazy!" on YouTube "Go Crazy!" (Party ver.) on YouTube "Midaretemina" (Party ver.) on YouTube

"Go Crazy!" (Korean: 미친거 아니야?; RR: Michingeo aniya?; lit. 'Aren't you crazy?') is a song recorded by South Korean boy group 2PM as the lead single for their fourth Korean studio album of the same name, released by JYP Entertainment on September 15, 2014. It was the group's first title track written by one of the group's members, rather than J.Y. Park. The music video for the song won the MAMA Award for Best Music Video in 2014.

A Japanese version of the song titled "Midaretemina" (Japanese: ミダレテミナ) was released as the group's eighth Japanese single on September 17, 2014. The single was certified Gold by the Recording Industry Association of Japan.

== Background and release ==
2PM's Korean comeback in 2014 was originally scheduled for April, but it was postponed due the sinking of MV Sewol on April 16, 2014. On September 5, a teaser for the music video of the title track "Go Crazy!" was uploaded on JYP's YouTube channel. A second teaser for an alternate version of the music video was released on September 7. The music video for "Go Crazy!" was released on YouTube on September 10. The song was released digitally along with the rest of the album on September 15, 2014.

A Japanese-language version of "Go Crazy!", titled "Midaretemina", was released on September 17, 2014 by Epic Records Japan in four editions: a regular edition, a LP-size limited edition, and two CD + DVD editions. "Midaretemina" was later included in the group's fourth Japanese studio album, 2PM of 2PM.

== Composition ==
"Go Crazy!" is a dance-pop song about partying written by 2PM member Jun. K and composed by Jun. K, Danny Majic, Glen Choi, Fingazz and Dustin Tavella. The song is composed in the key D-sharp minor at a rate of 123 beats per minute and a running time of 3 minutes and 59 seconds. The song is described as a blend of disco and EDM with bass, synth-strings, and guitar, while also containing elements of bounce and house music.

The B-side of "Midateremina" is the Japanese-language song "Fight", co-written by 2PM member Taecyeon. A Korean-language version of "Fight" was first performed at 2PM's Go Crazy World Tour shows in Seoul, but an official studio version of the track has not been released.

== Music video ==
In March 2014, during the filming of the music video of "Go Crazy!", a fire broke out on the set of the music video. Authorities later stated that the fire was relatively small and had been controlled by the time the fire team arrived, resulting in minimal damage and no injuries. The fire reportedly started when a spark from some fireworks which were being used in the music video landed on a sponge.

The music video, produced by Zanybros, would go on to win the MAMA Award for Best Music Video in 2014. In the music video, the group dances in various sets, such as a warehouse, a nightclub, and a set with neon strobe lights, crashing through the walls between them to transition. The member's comically exaggerated expressions and the song's choreography mimicking the act of riding a motorcycle received particular attention.

An alternate "Party version" music video, set in a house party and a nightclub, was released on September 15, 2014.

== Promotion ==
In promotion of "Go Crazy!", 2PM held various club party-themed fan events at nightclubs in Seoul, including a "Pre-Party" event for fans prior to the release of the album on September 10 at Club Octagon, which was also live streamed via Naver Music. The group first performed "Go Crazy!" on Mnet's M Countdown on September 11, 2014. They ended promotions on Korean television music programs after three weeks to embark on their first world tour, titled Go Crazy World Tour, on October 3. 2PM also performed "Go Crazy!" at various end-of-year television programs such as the 2014 KBS Song Festival. The group's "free-spirited" performances of the song often received attention due to the members' unconventional outfits and styling.

On September 17, 2014, 2PM held a surprise live performance titled "Midaretemina" Surprise Party at Roppongi Hills Arena to celebrate the release of "Midaretemina", only announcing the location of the performance as "somewhere in Tokyo" and the time of the performance beforehand. There, the group performed "Midaretemina", the B-side track "Fight", and the group's 2011 song "Hands Up". In 2018, in celebration of the group's 10th anniversary since debuting, unreleased behind-the-scenes footage from the performance was screened at a fan event in Tokyo titled 2PM 10th Anniversary 10th Hottest Day 2018. The footage was later released in 2020 as part of the compilation album The Best of 2PM in Japan 2011–2016. The group also made their first guest appearance on Japanese radio in three years in order to promote the single on the September 21, 2014 episode of Shofukutei Tsurube's Sunday Show, hosted by Shofukutei Tsurube II.

== Reception ==
Jeff Benjamin of Billboard described the song as "throwback-tinged", praising it for "compellingly straddl[ing] the line between" disco and EDM. Journalist Tomonori Shiba similarly complimented the Japanese version of the song for mixing old and new music genres, calling it a major and timely shift in the group's sound and image. "Midaretemina" topped various Japanese daily music charts, including Oricon and Tower Records, eventually being certified Gold by the Recording Industry Association of Japan the same month of its release for selling over 100,000 copies.

== Track listing ==
CD+DVD and CD-only track listing
No.	Title	Lyrics	Music	Mixer	Length
1.	"Midaretemina" (ミダレテミナ)	Jun. K; Shoko Fujibayashi	Jun. K; Danny Majic; Glen Choi (DJ Nure); Fingazz; Dustin Tavella	Fingazz; DJ Nure	4:03
2.	"Fight"	Taecyeon; Raphael; Joohyo; Risa Horie; Garfunkel	Taecyeon; Raphael; Joohyo	Taecyeon; Raphael; Joohyo	3:07
3.	"Midaretemina" (without main vocal)		Jun. K; Majic; Choi; Fingazz; Tavella	Fingazz; DJ Nure	4:03
4.	"Fight" (without main vocal)		Taecyeon; Raphael; Joohyo	Taecyeon; Raphael; Joohyo	3:07
Total length:					14:18

LP-size limited edition track listing
No.	Title	Lyrics	Music	Mixer	Length
1.	"Midaretemina"	Jun. K; Shoko Fujibayashi	Jun. K; Danny Majic; Glen Choi (DJ Nure); Fingazz; Dustin Tavella	Fingazz; DJ Nure	4:03
2.	"Fight"	Taecyeon; Raphael; Joohyo; Risa Horie; Garfunkel	Taecyeon; Raphael; Joohyo	Taecyeon; Raphael; Joohyo	3:07
3.	"Midaretemina" (Boytoy crazy mix)	Jun. K; Fujibayashi	Jun. K; Majic; Choi; Fingazz; Tavella	Boytoy	4:11
4.	"Midaretemina" (Boytoy vibe mix)	Jun. K; Fujibayashi	Jun. K; Majic; Choi; Fingazz; Tavella	Boytoy	3:07
5.	"Midaretemina" (Djnure VS. Fingazz Remix)	Jun. K; Fujibayashi	Jun. K; Majic; Choi; Fingazz; Tavella	Fingazz; DJ Nure	3:32
Total length:					18:00

DVD (press limited edition A)
No.	Title	Length
1.	"Midaretemina (music video)"
2.	"Midaretemina (music video – Party ver.)"

DVD (press limited edition B)
No.	Title	Length
1.	"Midaretemina Making Movie"

== Charts ==
=== Weekly charts ===
Weekly chart performance for "Go Crazy!"
Chart (2014)	Peak position
South Korea (Gaon)	5
South Korea (Gaon Social Chart)	20
South Korea (Gaon Streaming Singles Chart)	20
South Korea (Gaon Download Singles Chart)	5
South Korea (Gaon BGM Chart)	5
South Korea (Gaon Mobile Ringtone Chart	32
US World Digital Songs (Billboard)	5

Weekly chart performance for "Midaretemina"
Chart (2014)	Peak position
Japan (Oricon)	2
Japan (Billboard Japan Hot 100)	1

=== Monthly charts ===
Monthly chart performance for "Go Crazy!"
Chart (September 2014)	Peak position
South Korea (Gaon)	22

Monthly chart performance for "Midaretemina"
Chart (September 2014)	Peak position
Japan (Oricon)	5

== Sales ==
Country	Sales
South Korea (digital)	280,338
Japan (physical)	110,009

== Awards ==
Year	Organization	Award	Result	Ref.
2014	Mnet Asian Music Awards	MAMA Award for Best Music Video	Won	
2014	SBS MTV Best of Best	Best Dance Music Video	Nominated	

== Release history ==
Release history for "Go Crazy!"
Region	Date	Format	Label
Various	September 15, 2014	Digital download	JYP
Japan	September 17, 2014	CD, CD + DVD, Digital download	Epic Records Japan
