= Go Crazy! (album) =

Studio album by 2PM
- Released: September 15, 2014
- Recorded: 2014
- Genres: K-pop; Electronic; Contemporary R&B; Synth-pop
- Length: 39:17
- Language: Korean
- Label: JYP
- Producers: Jun. K; J.Y. Park

2PM chronology
Genesis of 2PM (2014)	Go Crazy! (2014)	2PM of 2PM (2015)

Singles from Go Crazy!
- 1. "Go Crazy!" Released: September 10, 2014

Go Crazy! (Korean: 미친거 아니야?; RR: Michingeo aniya?; lit. 'Aren't you crazy?'; stylized in all capital letters) is the fourth Korean and seventh overall studio album by South Korean boy band 2PM. The album was released on September 15, 2014 by JYP Entertainment. A repackaged edition with seven additional tracks, titled Go Crazy! (Grand Edition), was released on September 29, 2014.

== Background ==
2PM's 2014 comeback was originally scheduled for April, but was postponed due the sinking of MV Sewol on April 16, 2014. Furthermore, during the filming for the music video of the title track in March, a fire broke out on set; however, it was reported that there was minimal damage and no injuries.

On August 28, 2014, Taecyeon first teased the group's comeback by releasing a photo of Nichkhun and Wooyoung on his personal Twitter account. This was followed by Jun. K, who released a photo of Taecyeon and Chansung, and then Wooyoung, who released a photo of Jun. K and Junho. On September 1, JYP officially released the three teaser photos and one group photo for 2PM's comeback, which was announced to be September 15.

On September 3, six more teaser photos of each individual member were released. On September 5, a teaser for the music video of the title track "Go Crazy!" was uploaded on JYP's YouTube channel. A second teaser for an alternate version of the music video was released on September 7. The full track list for the normal edition and grand edition was released the next day. On September 9, an album spoiler video was uploaded on JYP's YouTube channel. The music video for "Go Crazy!" was released on YouTube on September 10.

Go Crazy! was released on September 15 at 12am (KST). The normal edition consists of 11 songs, including Korean versions of two of their Japanese singles, "Beautiful" and "I'm Your Man". Several of the tracks were composed and written by the group's members, including the title track "Go Crazy!" by Jun. K. The grand edition was released on September 29 at 12pm (KST) with seven additional tracks, consisting of three remixes of "Go Crazy!" and four sub-unit songs composed and written by the group's members.

== Promotion ==
In promotion of the album, 2PM held various club party-themed fan events at nightclubs in Seoul, including a "Pre-Party" event for fans prior to the release of the album on September 10 at Club Octagon, which was also live streamed via Naver Music.

The group performed lead single "Go Crazy!" and B-side track "I'm Your Man" on South Korean television music programs for three weeks, starting with the September 11, 2014 episode of Mnet's M! Countdown. They ended promotions to embark on their first world tour, titled Go Crazy World Tour after the album, on October 3.

== Reception ==
Billboard writer Jeff Benjamin praised the album for showing the group's growth, stating that the group incorporates "unexpected sounds without straying too far from their R&B-pop roots". He complimented both the album's "throwback-tinged" tracks, which are mainly inspired by 80s synth-pop, as well as the more "modern-day" songs such as the R&B track "Pull&Pull".

== Track listing ==
All editions track list
No.	Title	Lyrics	Music	Arrangements	Length
1.	"Go Crazy!" (Korean: 미친거 아니야?; RR: Michingeo aniya?)	Jun. K	Jun. K; Danny Majic; Glen Choi; Fingazz; Dustin Tavella	Jun. K; Majic; Choi; Fingazz; Tavella	3:59
2.	"Like Tonight" (Korean: 오늘 같은 밤; RR: Oneul gateun bam)	Playful Children	Playful Children; Shin Man-soo	Playful Children; Shin	3:25
3.	"She's Ma Girl"	Ha Jung-ho	Ha	Ha; Storyteller	3:08
4.	"Mine"	Chansung; Taecyeon	Ilanguaq Lumholt; Lasse Lindorff; Thor Norgaard; Mads Moller	Lumholt; Lindorff; Norgaard; Moller	4:15
5.	"Awesome!"	Laybacksound; Taecyeon	Laybacksound	Laybacksound	3:24
6.	"Rain is Falling" (Korean: 비가와; RR: Bigawa)	Glory Face; Taecyeon	Glory Face; Alto	Glory Face	3:54
7.	"Boyfriend"	Chansung; Taecyeon	Chansung; Shim Eun-ji	Shim	3:49
8.	"Pull&Pull"	Ragoon IM; Ryan IM; Taecyeon	Ragoon IM; Ryan IM	Ragoon IM; Ryan IM	3:13
9.	"Farewell Trip" (Korean: 이별여행; RR: Ibyeoryeohaeng)	Jun. K	Jun. K; Lel	Lel	3:04
10.	"Beautiful" (Korean ver.)	J.Y. Park	J.Y. Park	"The Asiansoul"; Hong Ji-sang	3:56
11.	"I'm Your Man" (Korean ver.)	J.Y. Park	J.Y. Park; Super Changddai	Super Changddai	3:10
Total length:					39:17

Bonus CD (Grand Edition only)
No.	Title	Lyrics	Music	Arrangements	Length
1.	"Superman" (performed by Jun. K and Wooyoung)	Jun. K; Wooyoung; Young Sky	Jun. K; Boytoy	Boytoy	3:47
2.	"Please Come Back" (Korean: 돌아와줘; RR: Dorawajwo) (performed by Taecyeon and Chansung feat. Baek A-yeon)	Taecyeon	Taecyeon	Fame-J	3:42
3.	"Love is True" (performed by Junho and Nichkhun)	Junho; Nichkhun	Junho; Hong Ji-sang	Hong	4:04
4.	"The Word, Love" (Korean: 사랑한단 말; RR: Saranghandan mal) (performed by Taecyeon and Chansung)	Chansung; Taecyeon	Chansung	Super Changddai	3:27
5.	"Go Crazy!" ("Boytoy Crazy" remix)	Jun. K	Jun. K; Majic; Choi; Fingazz; Tavella	Boytoy	4:11
6.	"Go Crazy!" ("Boytoy Vibe" remix)	Jun. K	Jun. K; Majic; Choi; Fingazz; Tavella	Boytoy	3:07
7.	"Go Crazy!" (Djnure VS. Fingazz remix)	Jun. K	Jun. K; Majic; Choi; Fingazz; Tavella	Choi; Fingazz	3:32
Total length:					25:50

== Charts and sales ==
=== Weekly charts ===
Weekly chart performance for Go Crazy!
Chart	Peak position
South Korea (Gaon)	3
Japan (Oricon)	18
US World Albums (Billboard)	7

Weekly chart performance for Go Crazy! (Grand Edition)
Chart	Peak position
South Korea (Gaon)	5

=== Monthly charts ===
Monthly chart performance for Go Crazy!
Chart	Peak position
South Korea (Gaon)	4

Monthly chart performance for Go Crazy! (Grand Edition)
Chart	Peak position
South Korea (Gaon)	8

=== Sales ===
Chart	Sales
Gaon physical sales	53,311+

== Release history ==
Country	Version	Date	Format	Label
South Korea	Normal edition	September 15, 2014	Digital download	JYP Entertainment, KT Music
South Korea	Normal edition	September 16, 2014	CD	JYP Entertainment, KT Music
South Korea	Grand edition	September 29, 2014	Digital download	JYP Entertainment, KT Music
South Korea	Grand edition	September 29, 2014	CD	JYP Entertainment, KT Music
