= Michael Yano =

Ghanaian footballer (born 1979)

Michael Yano 矢野 マイケル
Personal information
- Date of birth: January 22, 1979 (age 47)
- Place of birth: Accra, Ghana
- Height: 1.74 m (5 ft 8 1/2 in)
- Position: Forward

Youth career
- Shimizu S-Pulse

Senior career*
| Years | Team | Apps | (Gls) |
| 1997–1998 | Vissel Kobe | 13 | (1) |
| 2000 | Mito HollyHock | 13 | (0) |
| 2001 | Sagan Tosu | 20 | (2) |
| Total | | 46 | (3) |
- * Club domestic league appearances and goals

Michael Yano (矢野 マイケル, Yano Michael; born January 22, 1979) is a Ghanaian former footballer, kickboxing player and musician.

== Playing career ==
Yano was born in Accra, Ghana on January 22, 1979 to a Japanese father and a Ghanaian mother. He moved to Japan when he was 10 years old. He joined newly was promoted to J1 League club, Vissel Kobe from Shimizu S-Pulse youth team in 1997. Although he played many matches as forward in 1997, he could hardly play in the match in 1998. After 1 year blank, he joined newly was promoted to J2 League club, Mito HollyHock in 2000. In 2001, he moved to J2 club Sagan Tosu. He retired end of 2001 season.

== After retirement ==
After retirement, he became a kickboxing player and musician. He has also written songs for artists such as 2PM and AAA.

== Club statistics ==
| Club performance | | | League | | Cup | | League Cup | | Total | |
| Season | Club | League | Apps | Goals | Apps | Goals | Apps | Goals | Apps | Goals |
| Japan | | | League | | Emperor's Cup | | J.League Cup | | Total | |
|---|---|---|---|---|---|---|---|---|---|---|
| 1997 | Vissel Kobe | J1 League | 10 | 1 | 1 | 0 | 0 | 0 | 11 | 1 |
| 1998 | Vissel Kobe | J1 League | 3 | 0 | | | 1 | 0 | 4 | 0 |
| 2000 | Mito HollyHock | J2 League | 13 | 0 | | | 2 | 1 | 15 | 1 |
| 2001 | Sagan Tosu | J2 League | 20 | 2 | | | 2 | 0 | 22 | 2 |
| Total | | | 46 | 3 | 1 | 0 | 5 | 1 | 52 | 4 |
