= Jung Yi-seo =

South Korean actress (born 1993)

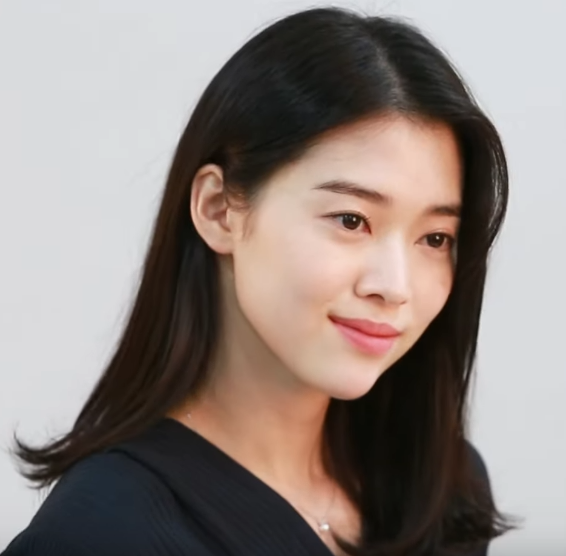
- Jung in June 2021
- Born: August 13, 1993 (age 33); Seoul, South Korea
- Other name: Jeong E-suh
- Education: Dongduk Women's University (Department of Broadcasting and Entertainment)
- Occupation: Actress
- Years active: 2014–present
- Agent: J Wide-Company

Korean name
- Hangul: 정동화
- RR: Jeong Donghwa
- MR: Chŏng Tonghwa

Stage name
- Hangul: 정이서
- RR: Jeong Iseo
- MR: Chŏng Isŏ
- Website: jwide.co.kr

Jung Yi-seo (Korean: 정이서; born August 13, 1993) is a South Korean actress. She is known for her roles in dramas such as Tale of the Nine Tailed (2020), Mine (2021), Snowdrop (2022), and All of Us Are Dead (2022). She has also appeared in films such as Parasite (2019), Samjin Company English Class (2020), Real (2017), Josée (2020), and Decision to Leave (2022).

== Early life ==
Jung Dong-hwa was born on August 13. She lived in United States from the age of 3 to 12. In her last year in primary school, her family relocated to South Korea. Due to her inability to speak fluent Korean, Jung couldn't get along well with her friends. She went to movie theater by herself and watched film A Cube of Sugar. She was moved to tears and decided that she should become an actor.

Jung studied art and attended acting academy. Later, she attended Dongduk Women's University's Department of Broadcasting and Entertainment.

== Career ==
In 2014, she made her debut in a minor role in Kundo: Age of the Rampant. Her breakthrough came after her appearance as a pizza shop owner in Bong Joon-ho's film Parasite. She scolded Ki-taek (Song Kang-ho) and Ki-woo (Choi Woo-shik) for not folding the pizza boxes properly, a brief but impactful appearance, a scene stealer.

In 2021, she appeared as supporting role in Lee Na-jeong's television drama Mine, starring Lee Bo-young and Kim Seo-hyung. She portrayed Kim Yu-yeon, an orphan who used to be a teacher at the Ilsin Foundation and the new housemaid at Cadenza. Her performance in the drama was well received.

== Filmography ==
=== Film ===
| Year | Title | Role | Ref. |
|---|---|---|---|
| 2014 | Kundo: Age of the Rampant | Si-ra | |
| 2017 | Real | Secret room club addict | |
| 2018 | Duck Town | Non-believable woman | |
| 2019 | Parasite | Pizza parlor owner | |
| 2020 | On July 7 | Mi-joo | |
| 2020 | Samjin Company English Class | Audit office employee | |
| 2020 | Josée | Na-young | |
| 2022 | Decision to Leave | Yoo Mi-ji | |
| 2023 | Her Hobby | Jung-in | |

=== Television series ===
| Year | Title | Role | Notes | Ref. |
|---|---|---|---|---|
| 2017 | Hello, My Twenties! 2 | Ye-eun's classmate | | |
| 2019 | Voice 3 | Kwon Se-young | | |
| 2019 | KBS Drama Special: "Goodbye B1" | Kyung-hee | Season 10; one act-drama | |
| 2020 | Tale of the Nine Tailed | Kim Sae-rom | | |
| 2021 | Mine | Kim Yoo-yeon | | |
| 2021 | KBS Drama Special: "Atonement" | Woo Hyung-joo | Season 12; one act-drama | |
| 2021–2022 | Snowdrop | Shin Gyeong-ja | | |
| 2023 | O'PENing: "Don't Press the Peach" | Jang Ha-gu | one act-drama | |

=== Web series ===
| Year | Title | Role | Ref. |
|---|---|---|---|
| 2018 | My Ex Diary | Lee Bo-na | |
| 2019 | Cat's Bar | Eun-joo | |
| 2022 | All of Us Are Dead | Kim Hyeon-ju | |
| 2022 | The King of the Desert | Na Yi Seo | |
| 2024 | A Killer Paradox | Seo Yeo-ok | |
| 2025 | When Life Gives You Tangerines | Song Bu-seon | |
| 2026 | The Wonderfools | Seok Ju-ran | |

== Awards and nominations ==
Name of the award ceremony, year presented, category, nominee of the award, and the result of the nomination
| Award ceremony | Year | Category | Nominee / Work | Result | Ref. |
|---|---|---|---|---|---|
| Bucheon International Fantastic Film Festival | 2023 | Best Actress | Her Hobby | Won | |
