= List of awards and nominations received by Lee Jun-ho =

Lee Jun-ho awards and nominations
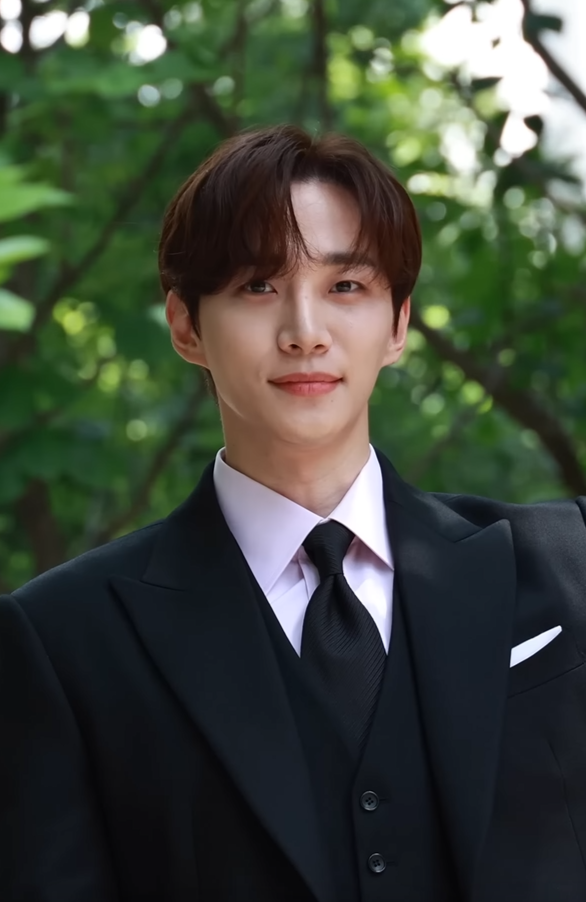
- Lee in 2023
Awards and nominations
Award	Wins	Nominations
APAN Star Awards	9	11
Asia Artist Awards	12	13
Asia Star Entertainer Awards	3	3
Baeksang Arts Awards	2	3
Brand Customer Loyalty Awards	2	2
Buil Film Awards	0	1
Fundex Awards	1	2
Japan Gold Disc Award	1	1
KBS Drama Awards	2	3
Korea PD Awards	1	1
Korea Drama Awards	0	1
MBC Drama Awards	2	2
SBS Drama Awards	0	1

Totals (Note: Certain award groups do not simply award one winner. They acknowledge several different recipients, have runners-up, and have third place. Since this is a specific recognition and is different from losing an award, runner-up mentions are considered wins in this award tally. For simplification and to avoid errors, each award in this list has been presumed to have had a prior nomination.)
- Wins: 35
- Nominations: 44

Lee Jun-ho is a South Korean singer, songwriter, dancer, composer, and actor who has achieved widespread acclaim and commercial success both as a member of the boy band 2PM and for his television and film roles.

Over an acting career spanning more than a decade, he has earned critical praise and accolades, including Grand Prize (Daesang) (Note: A Daesang (Korean: 대상), which translates to "Grand Prize", is the highest honor given out at South Korean award ceremonies.) at the APAN Star Awards and Asia Artist Awards, Baeksang Arts Awards, and multiple acting honors across broadcasting networks.

A Korean Wave entertainer-actor, he has also been included in annual rankings such as the Forbes Korea Power Celebrity 40 and Gallup Korea's Television Actor of the Year list.

== Awards and nominations ==
Name of the award ceremony, year presented, category, nominee of the award, and the result of the nomination
Award ceremony	Year	Category	Nominee / Work	Result	Ref.
APAN Star Awards	2022	Top Excellence Award, Actor in a Miniseries	The Red Sleeve	Won	
APAN Star Awards	2022	Best Couple	Lee Jun-ho (with Lee Se-young); The Red Sleeve	Nominated	
APAN Star Awards	2022	Popularity Star Award, Actor	The Red Sleeve	Nominated	
APAN Star Awards	2023	Best Character Award	King the Land	Won	
APAN Star Awards	2023	Best Couple Award	Lee Jun-ho (with Lim Yoona); King the Land	Won	
APAN Star Awards	2023	Global Star Award	Lee Jun-ho	Won	
APAN Star Awards	2023	Grand Prize (Daesang)	King the Land	Won	
APAN Star Awards	2023	Popularity Award (Male)	Lee Jun-ho	Won	
APAN Star Awards	2025	Global Star Award	Lee Jun-ho	Won	
APAN Star Awards	2025	Popularity Star Award, Actor	Lee Jun-ho	Won	
APAN Star Awards	2025	Top Excellence Award, Actor in a Miniseries	Typhoon Family	Won	
Asia Artist Awards	2017	Best Celebrity, Actor	Good Manager	Won	
Asia Artist Awards	2018	Artist of the Year, Actor	Wok of Love	Won	
Asia Artist Awards	2018	Best Emotive, Actor	Wok of Love	Won	
Asia Artist Awards	2022	AAA Hot Trend	Lee Jun-ho	Won	
Asia Artist Awards	2022	Grand Prize (Daesang) – Actor of the Year	The Red Sleeve	Won	
Asia Artist Awards	2023	AAA Hot Trend	Lee Jun-ho	Won	
Asia Artist Awards	2023	AAA Popularity Award	Lee Jun-ho	Won	
Asia Artist Awards	2023	Grand Prize (Daesang) – Actor of the Year	King the Land	Won	
Asia Artist Awards	2025	AAA Fabulous	Lee Jun-ho	Won	
Asia Artist Awards	2025	AAA Popularity Award	Lee Jun-ho	Won	
Asia Artist Awards	2025	Best Artist – Actor	Lee Jun-ho	Won	
Asia Artist Awards	2025	Grand Prize (Daesang) – Actor of the Year – TV	Typhoon Family	Won	
Asia Artist Awards	2026	Popularity Award – Actor	Lee Jun-ho	Pending	
Asia Star Entertainer Awards	2026	Best Artist (Actor)	Lee Jun-ho	Won	
Asia Star Entertainer Awards	2026	Best Character (Actor)	Lee Jun-ho	Won	
Asia Star Entertainer Awards	2026	Fan Choice – Artist (Actor)	Lee Jun-ho	Won	
Baeksang Arts Awards	2022	Best Actor – Television	The Red Sleeve	Won	
Baeksang Arts Awards	2022	Most Popular Actor	The Red Sleeve	Won	
Baeksang Arts Awards	2026	Best Actor – Television	Typhoon Family	Nominated	
Brand Customer Loyalty Awards	2022	Best Male Actor	The Red Sleeve	Won	
Brand Customer Loyalty Awards	2026	Best Actor (Drama)	Typhoon Family	Won	
Buil Film Awards	2013	Best New Actor	Cold Eyes	Nominated	
Fundex Awards	2023	Grand Prize (Daesang) – Drama Performer	Lee Jun-ho	Won	
Fundex Awards	2026	Best Actor of TV Drama	Typhoon Family	Pending	
Japan Gold Disc Award	2016	Best 3 Albums (Asia)	So Good	Won	
KBS Drama Awards	2017	Best Couple	Lee Jun-ho (with Namgoong Min); Good Manager	Won	
KBS Drama Awards	2017	Excellence Award, Actor in a Mid-length Drama	Good Manager	Won	
KBS Drama Awards	2017	Best New Actor	Good Manager	Nominated	
Korea Drama Awards	2022	Top Excellence Award, Actor	The Red Sleeve	Nominated	
Korea PD Awards	2022	Best Actor	The Red Sleeve	Won	
MBC Drama Awards	2021	Best Couple	Lee Jun-ho (with Lee Se-young); The Red Sleeve	Won	
MBC Drama Awards	2021	Top Excellence Award, Actor in a Miniseries	The Red Sleeve	Won	
SBS Drama Awards	2018	Top Excellence Award, Actor in a Monday–Tuesday Drama	Wok of Love	Nominated	

== State honors ==
Name of country, award ceremony, year given, and name of honor
Country	Award Ceremony	Year	Honor/Award	Ref.
South Korea	Savings Day	2012	Commendation from the Chairman of Finance	
South Korea	Seoul Conference on Social Welfare	2021	Seoul Mayor's Award	
South Korea	9th Finance Day	2024	Prime Minister's Commendation	
South Korea	Newsis K-Expo Cultural Awards	2026	Minister of Culture, Sports and Tourism Award	

== Listicles ==
Name of publisher, year listed, name of listicle, and placement
Publisher	Year	Listicle	Placement	Ref.
Elle Japan	2022	Top 16 Hallyu Best Actor	2nd	
Forbes	2023	Korea Power Celebrity 40	12th	
Forbes	2024	Korea Power Celebrity 40	20th	
Forbes	2026	Korea Power Celebrity 40	40th	
Gallup Korea	2023	Gallup Korea's Television Actor of the Year	11th	
Gallup Korea	2025	Gallup Korea's Television Actor of the Year	12th (Note: Tied for 12th place with 2.7% votes each with Kim Woo-bin)	
Korean Film Council	2021	Korean Actors 200 (Note: Introduces 200 actors that best represent the present and future of Korean cinema to the people in the film industry all over the world.)	Included	
Star News	2023	Best Idol-Actor of the Year (Male)	1st	

== See also ==
- List of awards and nominations received by 2PM
