= Secret Love (South Korean TV series) =

2013 South Korean TV series

- Promotional poster
- Also known as: Secret
- Genre: Melodrama; Thriller
- Created by: Kwak ki won KBS Drama Division
- Written by: Choi Ho-chul; Yoo Bo-ra
- Directed by: Lee Eung-bok; Baek Sang-hoon
- Starring: Ji Sung; Hwang Jung-eum; Bae Soo-bin; Lee Da-hee
- Music by: Gaemi
- Country of origin: South Korea
- Original language: Korean
- No. of episodes: 16

Production
- Executive producers: Hwang Eui-kyung; Choi Kwan-yong; Hwang Chang-woo
- Producers: Kim Jung-hyun; Park Woo-ram
- Production location: Korea
- Running time: 60 minutes on Wednesdays and Thursdays at 21:55 (KST)
- Production companies: Secret Love SPC; Content K

Original release
- Network: KBS2
- Release: 25 September – 14 November 2013

Secret Love (Korean: 비밀; RR: Bimil; lit. 'Secret') is a 2013 South Korean television series starring Hwang Jung-eum, Ji Sung, Bae Soo-bin and Lee Da-hee. It aired on KBS2 from September 25 to November 14, 2013, on Wednesdays and Thursdays at 21:55 for 16 episodes.

== Plot ==
A rich "bad boy" falls in love with an innocent but tenacious woman who went to prison for her boyfriend's 'hit and run' murder. As the story unfolds, secrets begin to unravel.

== Cast ==
=== Main ===
- Hwang Jung-eum as Kang Yoo-jung

She sacrifices her future by going to prison in place of her then-boyfriend, Do-hoon after he kills a woman in a hit-and-run. Refusing to give in to despair, she emerges from prison becoming a stronger woman who's determined to make a fresh start and live differently.

- Ji Sung as Jo Min-hyuk

A second-generation chaebol who has everything but a good personality, he burns with revenge after the death of his girlfriend, who was killed in the hit-and-run. He later realises there is a whole different story to the original culprit, and falls in love with the seemingly worst person to do so (Yoo-jung) as he realised her kindness in life.

- Bae Soo-bin as Ahn Do-hoon

Once a brilliant and righteous prosecutor, after his girlfriend went into prison instead of him, he transforms into an ambitious man, hungry for power.

- Lee Da-hee as Shin Se-yeon

She is engaged to Min-hyuk, and she has been buried in insecurity because of Min-hyuk's love to Ji-hee (his deceased girlfriend), then to Yoo-jung as the story progresses.

=== Supporting ===
- Lee Deok-hwa as Chairman Jo Han-il, father of Jo Min-hyuk and Jo Min-joo
- Jo Mi-ryung as Madam Hong In-joo, Chairman Jo Han-il's wife, Min-joo's mother and Min-hyuk's step-mother
- Song Min-kyung as Jo Min-joo, Jo Min-hyuk's sister
- Yang Jin-sung as Seo Ji-hee, Jo Min-hyuk's girlfriend, killed in crash
- Lee Seung-joon as Choi Kwang-min, Chairman Jo Han-il's secretary and Kwang-soo's older brother
- Choi Woong as Choi Kwang-soo, Jo Min-hyuk's secretary and Kwang-min's younger brother
- Kang Nam-gil as Kang Woo-chul, Kang Yoo-jung's father
- Ahn Ji-hyun as Yang Hae-ri, Kang Yoo-jung's friend
- Jung Soo-young as Dan-bal / Lee Ja-yeong
- Hwang Seok-jeong as Sandra Hwang
- Moon Ji-in as Lee Hye-jin, Kang Yoo-jung's prison friend
- Yang Hee-kyung as Park Kye-ok, Ahn Do-hoon's mother
- Kang Shin-il as Ahn In-hwan, Ahn Do-hoon's father
- Kim Hyun-kyun as Park Hyun-seok
- Han Ki-joong as Yang Ik-tae
- ?? as Assemblyman Shin Sang-ho
- Kim Hee-ryeong as Madam Yeon Mi-yeon
- Yoon Gil as Kim Jae-ha
- Kim Seong-hun as restaurant manager
- Jung Yoo-geon as San/Jeong Hwan
- Lee Dong-ha

== Ratings ==
- In the table below, the blue numbers represent the lowest ratings and the red numbers represent the highest ratings.
  - NR denotes that the drama did not rank in the top 20 daily programs on that date.

| Episode # | Original broadcast date | Average audience share | | | |
| Episode # | Original broadcast date | TNmS Ratings | | AGB Nielsen | |
| Episode # | Original broadcast date | Nationwide | Seoul National Capital Area | Nationwide | Seoul National Capital Area |
|---|---|---|---|---|---|
| 1 | 25 September 2013 | 4.7% (NR) | 4.7% (NR) | 5.3% (NR) | 5.6% (NR) |
| 2 | 26 September 2013 | 4.1% (NR) | 4.3% (NR) | 5.7% (NR) | 5.9% (NR) |
| 3 | 2 October 2013 | 6.2% (NR) | 6.6% (NR) | 7.2% (NR) | 7.9% (19th) |
| 4 | 3 October 2013 | 7.8% (18th) | 9.1% (14th) | 10.7% (11th) | 12.7% (9th) |
| 5 | 9 October 2013 | 10.6% (9th) | 11.8% (7th) | 12.4% (6th) | 14.2% (4th) |
| 6 | 10 October 2013 | 11.9% (9th) | 13.1% (6th) | 14.6% (3rd) | 15.4% (3rd) |
| 7 | 16 October 2013 | 12.4% (5th) | 13.4% (5th) | 15.1% (3rd) | 16.2% (3rd) |
| 8 | 17 October 2013 | 12.9% (6th) | 14.6% (5th) | 15.3% (3rd) | 16.4% (3rd) |
| 9 | 23 October 2013 | 13.0% (5th) | 14.9% (4th) | 15.3% (4th) | 16.8% (3rd) |
| 10 | 24 October 2013 | 13.8% (6th) | 14.7% (6th) | 16.3% (3rd) | 18.4% (2nd) |
| 11 | 30 October 2013 | 13.2% (6th) | 15.9% (4th) | 15.7% (3rd) | 17.3% (3rd) |
| 12 | 31 October 2013 | 14.6% (3rd) | 17.2% (3rd) | 16.7% (2nd) | 18.8% (2nd) |
| 13 | 6 November 2013 | 13.3% (5th) | 15.5% (4th) | 15.8% (4th) | 16.9% (3rd) |
| 14 | 7 November 2013 | 13.4% (6th) | 15.6% (5th) | 17.3% (3rd) | 18.9% (2nd) |
| 15 | 13 November 2013 | 13.3% (7th) | 14.7% (5th) | 17.4% (3rd) | 18.6% (3rd) |
| 16 | 14 November 2013. | 15.4% (4th) | 18.0% (3rd) | 18.9% (3rd) | 20.6% (2nd) |
| Average | | 11.3% | 12.8% | 13.7% | 15.0% |

== Awards and nominations ==
| Year | Award | Category | Recipient | Result |
|---|---|---|---|---|
| 2013 | KBS Drama Awards | Top Excellence Award, Actor | Ji Sung | Won |
| 2013 | KBS Drama Awards | Top Excellence Award, Actress | Hwang Jung-eum | Won |
| 2013 | KBS Drama Awards | Excellence Award, Actor in a Miniseries | Ji Sung | Nominated |
| 2013 | KBS Drama Awards | Excellence Award, Actress in a Miniseries | Hwang Jung-eum | Nominated |
| 2013 | KBS Drama Awards | Best Supporting Actor | Bae Soo-bin | Won |
| 2013 | KBS Drama Awards | Best Supporting Actress | Lee Da-hee | Won |
| 2013 | KBS Drama Awards | Netizen Choice Award | Hwang Jung-eum | Won |
| 2013 | KBS Drama Awards | Popularity Award | Ji Sung | Won |
| 2013 | KBS Drama Awards | Popularity Award | Bae Soo-bin | Nominated |
| 2013 | KBS Drama Awards | Popularity Award | Hwang Jung-eum | Nominated |
| 2013 | KBS Drama Awards | Popularity Award | Lee Da-hee | Nominated |
| 2013 | KBS Drama Awards | Best Couple Award | Ji Sung and Hwang Jung-eum | Won |
| 2013 | KBS Drama Awards | Best Couple Award | Bae Soo-bin and Lee Da-hee | Nominated |
| 2014 | 50th Baeksang Arts Awards | Most Popular Actor (TV) | Ji Sung | Nominated |
| 2014 | 50th Baeksang Arts Awards | Most Popular Actress (TV) | Hwang Jung-eum | Nominated |
| 2014 | 50th Baeksang Arts Awards | Best OST | Tears Stole the Heart - Ailee | Nominated |
| 2014 | 2nd Asia Rainbow TV Awards | Outstanding Modern Drama | Secret Love | Won |
| 2014 | 7th Korea Drama Awards | Top Excellence Award, Actress | Hwang Jung-eum | Nominated |
| 2014 | 3rd APAN Star Awards | Excellence Award, Actor in a Miniseries | Ji Sung | Nominated |

== Original soundtrack ==
Secret Love OST

Soundtrack album by Various Artists
- Genres: Soundtrack, Pop
- Languages: Korean, English

=== Track listings ===
| No. | Title | Artist | Length |
|---|---|---|---|
| 1. | "Because Of Tears" | Ailee | 4:04 |
| 2. | "Secret Love" | Ji Sook ft. Outsider | 3:26 |

== Version ==
Secret Love later being adapted into a Malay-language drama, dubbed Patahnya Sebelah Sayap (broke leftwings) starred Ummi Nazeera, Aeril Zafril and Izzue Islam in March 2018 in TV3. However, only a few scene is similar, and most of the scenes were changed to follow Malaysian custom and life style, which differs greatly to the Korean Society.

Secret Love was also adapted into a Turkish drama, dubbed Meryem – Tales Of Innocence, starred Furkan Andic, Ayça Aysin Turan and Cemal Toktas. It was produced by TMC and aired on Kanal D from August 2, 2017, to February 28, 2018. And yet the Turkish remake witnessed some changes that are different from the original Korean plot.

Secret Love was also adapted into a Vietnamese drama as 7 năm chưa cưới để chia tay, aired directly on VieON around June 2024.
