= List of awards and nominations received by 2PM =

2PM awards and nominations
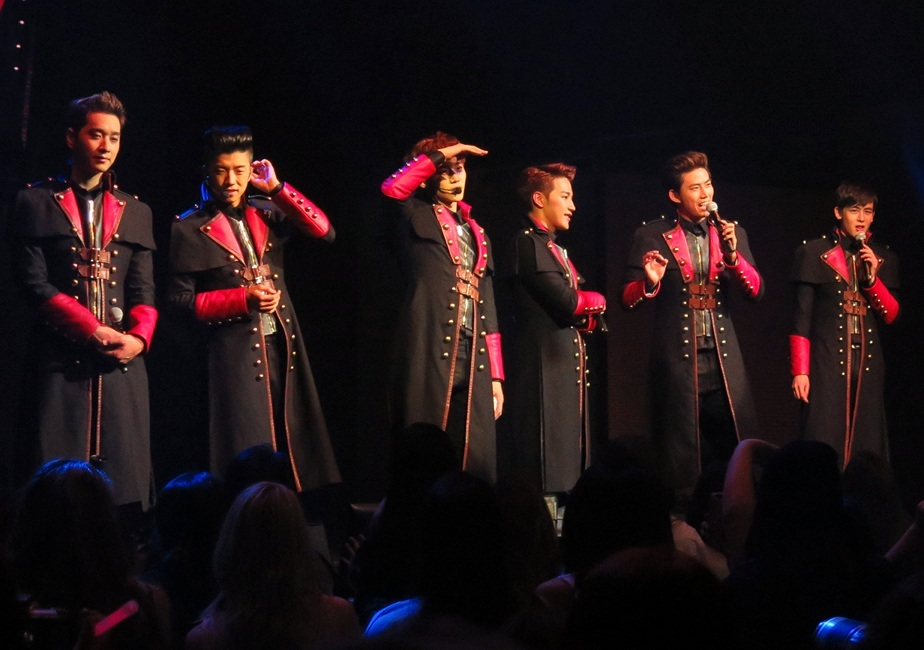
- 2PM in November 2015
Awards and nominations
Award	Wins	Nominations
Asia Artist Awards	0	2
Asia Model Festival Awards	1	1
Asia Song Festival	1	1
Billboard Japan Music Awards	0	1
Cyworld Digital Music Awards	2	2
Gaon Weibo Chart Awards	0	1
Global Chinese Music Awards	0	1
Golden Disc Awards	1	13
Japan Gold Disc Awards	3	3
KBS Music Festival	1	1
Korean Culture & Entertainment Awards	1	1
KU Music Asian Awards	1	1
MBC Entertainment Awards	1	1
Melon Music Awards	2	9
Mnet 20's Choice	4	9
Mnet Asian Music Awards	6	16
MTV Asia Awards	1	1
MTV Italy Awards	0	1
MTV Japan	2	2
Mandarin Music Honors	1	1
Nickelodeon Korea Kids' Choice Awards	1	1
SBS Gayo Daejeon	1	1
SBS MTV Best of the Best	0	3
Seoul Music Awards	2	7
Style Icon Awards	1	1
Thailand Pop Music Award	0	1
TVCF Awards	0	2
World Music	0	4

Totals (Note: Certain award groups do not simply award one winner. They acknowledge several different recipients, have runners-up, and have third place. Since this is a specific recognition and is different from losing an award, runner-up mentions are considered wins in this award tally. For simplification and to avoid errors, each award in this list has been presumed to have had a prior nomination.)
- Wins: 34
- Nominations: 86

These are the list of awards received by 2PM, a South Korean boy group. Their major accolade is winning the Artist of the Year award at the 2009 Mnet Asian Music Awards.

== Awards and nominations ==
Name of the award ceremony, year presented, category, nominee(s) of the award, and the result of the nomination
Award ceremony	Year	Category	Nominee / work	Result	Ref.
Asia Artist Awards	2021	Male Idol Group Popularity Award	2PM	Nominated	
Asia Artist Awards	2021	U+Idol Popularity Award – Male Idol Group	2PM	Nominated	
Asia Model Awards	2010	Popular Artist Award	2PM	Won	
Asia Song Festival	2008	Asian Newcomer's Award	2PM	Won	
Billboard Japan Music Awards	2013	Excellent Pop Artist Award	2PM	Nominated	
Cyworld Digital Music Awards	2008	Rookie of the Month (September)	"10 Out of 10"	Won	
Cyworld Digital Music Awards	2010	Bonsang Award	"Heartbeat"	Won	
Gaon Weibo Chart Awards	2014	K-POP Male Idol Group Award	2PM	Nominated	
Global Chinese Music Awards	2015	Best Group	2PM	Nominated	
Golden Disc Awards	2008	Rookie of the Year (Digital Category)	"10 Out of 10"	Nominated	
Golden Disc Awards	2009	Disc Daesang (Album of the Year)	01:59PM	Nominated	
Golden Disc Awards	2009	Album Bonsang	01:59PM	Won	
Golden Disc Awards	2009	Digital Bonsang Award	"Again & Again"	Nominated	
Golden Disc Awards	2009	Samsung YEPP Popularity Award	2PM	Nominated	
Golden Disc Awards	2010	Digital Bonsang Award	"I'll Be Back"	Nominated	
Golden Disc Awards	2010	Popularity Award	2PM	Nominated	
Golden Disc Awards	2011	Album Bonsang	Hands Up	Nominated	
Golden Disc Awards	2011	Digital Song Bonsang	"Hands Up"	Nominated	
Golden Disc Awards	2011	Popularity Award	2PM	Nominated	
Golden Disc Awards	2013	Album Bonsang	Grown	Nominated	
Golden Disc Awards	2013	Popularity Award	2PM	Nominated	
Golden Disc Awards	2014	Album Bonsang	Go Crazy!	Nominated	
Golden Disc Awards	2015	Album Bonsang	No.5	Nominated	
Golden Disc Awards	2015	Popularity Award	2PM	Nominated	
Golden Disc Awards	2021	Album Bonsang	Must	Nominated	
Golden Disc Awards	2021	Seezn Most Popular Artist Award	2PM	Nominated	
Japan Gold Disc Award	2012	Best 3 New Artists (Asia)	2PM	Won	
Japan Gold Disc Award	2012	New Artist of the Year (Asia)	2PM	Won	
Japan Gold Disc Award	2016	Best Album of the Year (Asia)	2PM of 2PM	Won	
Japan Gold Disc Award	2017	Best Album of the Year (Asia)	Galaxy of 2PM	Won	
KBS Music Festival	2009	Song of the Year	"Again & Again"	Won	
Korean Culture & Entertainment Awards	2013	Best Male Idol Group	2PM	Won	
Ku Music Asian Music Awards	2016	Asian Most Popular Group	2PM	Won	
Mandarin Music Honors Awards	2010	Most Popular Asian Singer Award	2PM	Won	
MBC Entertainment Awards	2013	Popularity Award	2PM	Won	
Melon Music Awards	2009	Top 10 Artists	2PM	Won	
Melon Music Awards	2009	Artist of the Year	2PM	Nominated	
Melon Music Awards	2009	Song of the Year	"Again & Again"	Nominated	
Melon Music Awards	2009	Album of the Year	2:00PM Time for Change	Nominated	
Melon Music Awards	2010	Top 10 Artists (Bonsang)	2PM	Won	
Melon Music Awards	2010	Netizen Popularity Award	"Heartbeat"	Nominated	
Melon Music Awards	2011	Top 10 Artists (Bonsang)	2PM	Nominated	
Melon Music Awards	2011	Popularity Award	2PM	Nominated	
Melon Music Awards	2011	Best Music Video	"Hands Up"	Nominated	
Melon Music Awards	2011	Netizen Popularity Award	"Hands Up"	Nominated	
Mnet 20's Choice Awards	2009	Hot Performance Star Award	2PM	Won	
Mnet 20's Choice Awards	2009	Hot Summer Heat Popularity Award	2PM	Won	
Mnet 20's Choice Awards	2010	Daum's Search Hot Star Award (Special Award)	2PM	Won	
Mnet 20's Choice Awards	2010	Most Influential Stars	2PM	Won	
Mnet 20's Choice Awards	2011	Hot Performance Star	2PM	Nominated	
Mnet 20's Choice Awards	2011	Hot CF star	2PM	Nominated	
Mnet 20's Choice Awards	2011	Hot Hallyu star	2PM	Nominated	
Mnet 20's Choice Awards	2011	Hot Balance star	2PM	Nominated	
Mnet 20's Choice Awards	2013	20's Mwave Global Star	2PM	Nominated	
Mnet Asian Music Awards	2008	Best New Male Artist	"10 Out of 10"	Nominated	
Mnet Asian Music Awards	2009	Artist of the Year	"Again & Again"	Won	
Mnet Asian Music Awards	2009	Best Male Group	"Again & Again"	Won	
Mnet Asian Music Awards	2009	Best Dance Performance	"Again & Again"	Nominated	
Mnet Asian Music Awards	2010	Artist of the Year	2PM	Nominated	
Mnet Asian Music Awards	2010	Best Male Group	2PM	Won	
Mnet Asian Music Awards	2010	The Shilla Duty Free Asian Wave	2PM	Won	
Mnet Asian Music Awards	2010	Best Dance Performance	"I'll Be Back"	Won	
Mnet Asian Music Awards	2010	Song of the Year	"I'll Be Back"	Nominated	
Mnet Asian Music Awards	2011	Best Male Group	2PM	Nominated	
Mnet Asian Music Awards	2011	Artist of the Year	2PM	Nominated	
Mnet Asian Music Awards	2011	Singapore's Choice Award	2PM	Nominated	
Mnet Asian Music Awards	2014	Best Music Video	"Go Crazy!"	Won	
MTV Asia Awards	2010	Best Popularity Award	2PM	Won	
MTV Italy Awards	2014	Best Artist from the World	2PM	Nominated	
MTV Video Music Awards Japan	2012	Best Group Video	"I'm Your Man"	Won	
MTV Video Music Awards Japan	2013	Album of the Year	Legend of 2PM	Won	
Nickelodeon Korea Kids' Choice Awards	2011	Favorite Male Singer	2PM	Won	
SBS Awards Festival	2014	Global Star Award	2PM	Won	
SBS MTV Best of Best	2011	Best Male Group	2PM	Nominated	
SBS MTV Best of Best	2011	Best Rival	2PM	Nominated	
SBS MTV Best of Best	2014	Best Dance Music Video	"Go Crazy!"	Nominated	
Seoul Music Awards	2009	Popularity Award	2PM	Won	
Seoul Music Awards	2009	Bonsang Award	2PM	Won	
Seoul Music Awards	2013	Bonsang Award	2PM	Nominated	
Seoul Music Awards	2013	Popularity Award	2PM	Nominated	
Seoul Music Awards	2014	Bonsang Award	2PM	Nominated	
Seoul Music Awards	2014	Popularity Award	2PM	Nominated	
Seoul Music Awards	2014	Hallyu Award	2PM	Nominated	
Style Icon Awards	2010	Male Singer Award	2PM	Won	
Thailand Pop Music Award	2009	N/A	2PM	Won	
TVCF Awards	2011	CF Model of the Year	2PM	Nominated	
TVCF Awards	2012	CF Model of the Year	2PM	Nominated	
World Music Awards	2013	Best Group	2PM	Nominated	
World Music Awards	2014	Best Group	2PM	Nominated	
World Music Awards	2014	Best Live Act	2PM	Nominated	
World Music Awards	2014	Best Album	Genesis of 2PM	Nominated	

== Listicles ==
Name of publisher, year listed, name of listicle, and placement
Publisher	Year	Listicle	Placement	Ref.
Forbes	2010	Korea Power Celebrity	11th	
Forbes	2011	Korea Power Celebrity	5th	
Forbes	2012	Korea Power Celebrity	11th	
Forbes	2013	Korea Power Celebrity	15th	

== See also ==
- List of awards and nominations received by Lee Jun-ho
