= Lee Na-jeong =

South Korean filmmaker (born 1978)

- Born: 1978 (age 47–48); South Korea
- Education: Sogang University
- Occupation: Television director
- Years active: 2006 - present
- Employers: KBS (2006–2017); Studio Dragon (2018 to 2022); Studio Trii (2022 to present)
- Agent: Brillstein Entertainment Partners

Korean name
- Hangul: 이나정
- Hanja: 李娜靜
- RR: I Najeong
- MR: I Najŏng

Lee Na-jeong (Korean: 이나정; born 1978) is a South Korean film, television director and producer. Lee is best known for her work as director of KBS television series Fight for My Way (2017), Netflix original series Love Alarm (2019) and tvN mystery thriller Mine (2021), as well as her critically acclaimed film Snowy Road (2017).

Lee started her career in KBS Drama Department as an assistant director. In 2018, Lee resigned from KBS and moved to Studio Dragon Drama Department. Lee signed a deal with Brillstein Entertainment Partners in 2021. She became the first Korean female television director to have joined a U.S. management agency.

== Early life and education ==
Lee Na-jeong was born in 1978. She graduated from Journalism Department of Sogang University. In 2005, Lee applied for the 31st Public Recruitment at KBS. Lee started her career in KBS Drama Department as an assistant director.

== Career ==
=== Beginning in KBS ===
Lee Na-jeong started her career as an assistant director for the drama It's Only You in 2011. In 2012, she served as an assistant director to Kim Jin-won for the drama The Innocent Man. Her breakthrough came when she took on the role of the main director for the KBS Drama Special - Yeonwoo's Summer in 2013.

In early 2014, Lee began planning the project Snowy Road in collaboration with writer Yoo Bo-ra. Set in 1944 during the final years of the Japanese colonial period, the story depicts the harrowing realities faced by two young women, Jong-bun (Kim Hyang-gi) and Young-ae (Kim Sae-ron), who were forced to be comfort women. Despite the weight of the subject matter, the principal photography was completed in just 17 days.

Although the project premiered as a two-part television special on KBS1 in 2015, KBS had envisioned it as a feature film from its inception. This dual-format strategy was intentional; while broadcasting content faced distribution hurdles in Japan, a theatrical version offered a pathway to international film festivals and human rights screenings. To facilitate this, the production utilized both broadcasting and film crews, and the script was developed collaboratively to suit both mediums. The goal was to maximize viewership and raise global awareness regarding the historical issue. The theatrical version debuted at the 16th Jeonju International Film Festival and received a nationwide release on March 1, 2017, a date chosen to coincide with South Korea's Independence Movement Day in South Korea, which commemorates the 1919 March First Movement. Snowy Road gained significant international recognition, notably winning the Prix Italia for TV Drama/TV Movie at the 67th Prix Italia Awards in 2016.

=== As director at Studio Dragon ===
Following her departure from KBS, Lee joined the production company Studio Dragon. Her inaugural project at the studio was Love Alarm, based on the Daum webtoon of the same name by Chon Kye-young. Starring Kim So-hyun, Jung Ga-ram, and Song Kang, it gained distinction as the first Korean drama series confirmed for streaming on Netflix (Note: Although Love Alarm was confirmed first, Kingdom was streamed on the service before Love Alarm.) The series centers on a high school student navigating a society shaped by a mobile application that notifies users of nearby romantic interest. Starring first season premiered on August 22, 2019, and quickly became one of the platform's top releases, leading to its renewal in October 2019. While the second season, released on March 12, 2021, was helmed by a different director, the series maintained significant global popularity. In 2021, Love Alarm was ranked as the sixth most-watched K-drama worldwide on Netflix, and by 2022, it was the ninth most-searched Korean drama globally.

Director Lee Na-jeong said, "I wanted to portray the love and growth of three men and women who face the most ecstatic and exciting moments as well as the most painful and terrible moments while embodying the wonderfully well-crafted world of the original work. I want to share the deep emotion of the original work with more people."

In 2021, Lee collaborated with Writer Baek Mi-kyung on a drama centered around the theme of motherhood. Initially titled "Blue Diamond," Lee suggested changing the title to Mine, which Baek Mi-kyung gladly accepted. It explores the lives of wealthy family members and their servants, delving into the complexities of their relationships. Each women character defy societal prejudices to find their "truly mine." Mine made history as the first Korean drama to feature a lesbian character in a leading role, further expanding representation in the industry.

We put a lot of effort into expressing the luxury of the real upper class on screen. Because it is set in the top 1%, I thought there should be plenty to see, but the visuals should not be boring or distracting. I wanted to create a drama that would appeal to viewers' eyes and ears. We created a visual pre-production team (prior to filming) and prepared the concept for about 4 months, researching what kind of buildings the upper class likes in 2021 and what they use, wear, and eat. Based on this, we clearly communicated the image and direction we wanted to create to the staff, including the cinematographer and art director, and completed the work together. I also wanted to present a new standard for luxury. I tried to convey the feelings of real rich people by clearly choosing emptiness and filling.

— Lee Na-jeong, Women Donga's Interview.

The series, starring Lee Bo-young, Kim Seo-hyung, Lee Hyun-wook, and Ok Ja-yeon, premiered on tvN on May 8, 2021. It aired every Saturday and Sunday at 21:00 (KST) until June 27, 2021. Netflix acquired the exclusive rights for international distribution. The drama garnered substantial ratings throughout its run. With an average nationwide viewership of 8.208% and 9.078% in the metropolitan area, Mine attracted an average of 1.826 million viewers per episode. The drama's final episode recorded an average of 10.5% and 11.2% ratings for households nationwide and in the metropolitan area, respectively. These numbers surpassed its own previous highest ratings in both segments.

In 2021, Fine Cut, an overseas film distribution company, announced the news that Lee signed a deal with Brillstein Entertainment Partners in 2021, which has a number of production studios and Hollywood stars under its wing. She became the first Korean female TV director to have joined a U.S. management agency. Missy Malkin from Brillstain decided to signed Lee after watching tvN mystery thriller Mine (2021).

=== Studio Trii, Imaginus ===
In March 2024, it was reported that Lee joined Studio Trii as a creator, alongside director Lee Yoon-jung. Studio Trii, established in June 2022 by CEO Kim Jin-yi, operates as a production label under Imaginus, a media firm founded by former Studio Dragon CEO Choi Jin-hee.

== Filmography ==
=== Film ===
Feature film credits
Year	Title		Credited as			Scriptwriter	Notes	Ref.
Year	English	Korean	Assistant director	Director	Producer	Scriptwriter	Notes	Ref.
2017	Snowy Road	눈길	—N/a	Yes	—N/a	Yoo Bo-ra	Re-leased and re-edited version	

=== Television series ===
Television drama credits
Year	Title		Ep.	Network	Scriptwriter	Credited as			Ref.
Year	English	Korean	Ep.	Network	Scriptwriter	Assistant director	Director	Producer	Ref.
2006	Take Care, Weapon	무기여 잘 있거라	2	KBS2	Chae Su-bong	Yes	—N/a		
2008	Strongest Chil Woo	최강칠우	20	KBS2	Baek Un-cheol	Yes	—N/a		
2009	Ode to Youth	청춘예찬	75	KBS1	Choi Min-ki	Yes	—N/a		
2009	Hot Blood	열혈 장사꾼	20	KBS2	Hong Seung-hyun; Yoo Byung-woo; Kim Kyung-hoe	Yes	—N/a		
2011	The Princess' Man	공주의 남자	24	KBS2	Jo Jung-ju; Kim Wook	Yes	—N/a		
2011–2012	Only You	당신뿐이야	128	KBS1	Choi Min-ki	—N/a	Co-director (Note: Co-directed with PD Jin Hyung-wook)	—N/a	
2012	The Innocent Man	세상 어디에도 없는 착한남자	20	KBS2	Lee Kyung-hee	—N/a	Co-director (Note: Co-directed with PD Kim Jin-won)	—N/a	
2013	KBS Drama Special - Yeonwoo's Summer	KBS 드라마 스페셜 - 연우의 여름	1	KBS2	Yoo Bo-ra	—N/a	Yes	—N/a	
2014	Beyond the Clouds	태양은 가득히	16	KBS2	Heo Sung-hye	—N/a	—N/a	Yes	
2015	Snowy Road	눈길	2	KBS1	Yoo Bo-ra	—N/a	Yes	—N/a	
2015	Hello Monster	너를 기억해	16	KBS2	Kwon Ki-young	—N/a	Yes	—N/a	
2015–2016	Oh My Venus	오 마이 비너스	16	KBS2	Kim Eun-ji	—N/a	Co-director (Note: Co-directed with PD Kim Hyung-seok)	—N/a	
2016	Becky's Back	백희가 돌아왔다	4	KBS2	Lim Sang-choon	—N/a		Yes	
2016–2017	My Fair Lady	오 마이 금비	16	KBS2	Jeon Ho-sung	—N/a		Yes	
2017	Fight for My Way	쌈 마이웨이	16	KBS2	Lim Sang-choon	—N/a	Co-director (Note: Co-directed with PD Kim Dong-hwi)	—N/a	
2021	Mine	마인	16	tvN	Baek Mi-kyung	—N/a	Yes	—N/a	
2023	See You in My 19th Life	이번 생도 잘 부탁해	12	tvN	Choi Young-rim; Min Ye-ji	—N/a	Yes	—N/a	
2025	Typhoon Family	태풍상사	16	tvN	Jang Hyun-sook	—N/a	Co-director (Note: Co-directed with Kim Dung-hwi)	—N/a	

=== Web drama ===
Web drama credits
Year	Title		OTT	Credited as				Ref.
Year	English	Korean	OTT	Scriptwriter	Director	Production Company	Planner	Ref.
2019	Love Alarm Season 1	좋아하면 울리는	Netflix	Lee Ah-yeon; Seo Bo-ra	Yes	Kim Jin-yi	Studio Dragon	

== Accolades ==
Awards and nominations
Year	Award	Category	Recipient	Result	Ref.
2016	28th Korea Producer Awards	Best Picture in the TV Drama	Snowy Road	Won	
2016	24th Golden Rooster Awards	Best Foreign Film	Snowy Road	Won	
2016	Prix Italia	Best TV Drama-TV Movie category	Snowy Road	Won	
2017	Brand of the Year Awards	Drama of the Year	Fight for My Way	Won	
2017	1st The Seoul Awards	Best Drama	Fight for My Way	Nominated	
2018	30th Korea Producer Awards	Best Drama	Fight for My Way	Won	
2018	54th Baeksang Arts Awards	Best Drama	Fight for My Way	Nominated	
2018	13th Seoul International Drama Awards	Excellence Award for Korean Drama	Fight for My Way	Won	
2018	13th Seoul International Drama Awards	Best Comedy	Fight for My Way	Nominated	
2022	58th Baeksang Arts Awards	Best Director	Mine	Nominated	
