= Snowy Road =

- Theatrical release poster
- Hangul: 눈길
- RR: Nungil
- MR: Nunkil
- Directed by: Lee Na-jeong
- Written by: Yoo Bo-ra
- Produced by: Ham Yeong-hun
- Starring: Kim Hyang-gi; Kim Sae-ron
- Cinematography: Park Sung
- Edited by: Kim Young-ju
- Music by: Nam Hye-seung
- Production companies: KBS at9 Films
- Distributed by: CGV Arthouse
- Release dates: May 2015 (JIFF); March 1, 2017
- Running time: 122 minutes
- Country: South Korea
- Languages: Korean; Japanese
- Box office: US$866,692

Snowy Road (Korean: 눈길) is a 2015 South Korean historical drama film directed by Lee Na-jeong which narrates the story of two teenage girls' fate as comfort women during the Japanese occupation of Korea. It originally aired on KBS1 in 2015 as a two-part television special, and then was re-edited for theatrical screening. The theatrical cut was first showcased at the 16th Jeonju International Film Festival.

The film was theatrically released on March 1, 2017, also known as the Independence Movement Day in South Korea, which commemorates the 1919 March First Movement.

== Plot ==
In 1944, during the final years of the Japanese occupation, two girls are born in the same village but destined for completely different fates. Jong-boon, poor yet full of spirit, and Young-ae, the youngest daughter of a wealthy family who excels in her studies. Jong-boon admires the intelligent and beautiful Young-ae and envies her when she is sent away to Japan. Wishing for a better life, Jong-boon begs her mother to send her to Japan as well.

One day, while her mother is away, Jong-boon is left alone at home with her younger brother. Suddenly, Japanese soldiers storm into their house, forcibly dragging her away onto a train bound for an unknown destination. Confused and terrified, Jong-boon finds herself surrounded by other girls her age, all trembling in fear. Just then, Young-ae, whom she had believed to be studying abroad in Japan, is thrown into the same train car.

Now sharing the same tragic fate, the two girls are thrust into the horrors of war. While Jong-boon clings to the desperate hope of returning home, Young-ae, resigned to the cruel reality, makes a dangerous decision to bring an end to their nightmare.

== Cast ==
- Kim Hyang-gi as Choi Jong-boon (past)
  - Kim Young-ok as Choi Jong-boon (present)
- Kim Sae-ron as Kang Young-ae
- Cho Soo-hyang as Jang Eun-soo
- Jang Young-nam as Choi Jong-boon's mother
- Seo Young-joo as Kang Young-joo
- Lee Seung-yeon as Yoon Ok
- Jang Dae-woong as Choi Jong-gil
- Lee Joo-woo as Ayako
- Lee Kan-hee as Kang Young-ae's mother
- Seo Jin-won as Kang Young-ae's school teacher
- Choi Dae-chul as (cameo)
- Lee Hak-joo as Child soldier

== Awards and nominations ==
Year	Award	Category	Recipients	Result
2015	KBS Drama Awards	Best Young Actress	Kim Hyang-gi	Won
2015	24th Golden Rooster & Hundred Flowers Film Festival	Best Foreign Film	Snowy Road	Won
2015	24th Golden Rooster & Hundred Flowers Film Festival	Best Foreign Actress	Kim Sae-ron	Won
