= Typhoon Family =

2025 South Korean television series

- Promotional poster
- Hangul: 태풍상사
- RR: Taepungsangsa
- MR: T'aep'ungsangsa
- Genre: Period drama
- Created by: Studio Dragon
- Written by: Jang Hyun-sook
- Directed by: Lee Na-jeong; Kim Dong-hwi
- Starring: Lee Jun-ho; Kim Min-ha
- Music by: Dalpalan
- Opening theme: "Did You See The Rainbow?" by Lee Jun-ho
- Country of origin: South Korea
- Original language: Korean
- No. of episodes: 16

Production
- Executive producer: Kim Ryon-hee
- Producers: Lee Ji-min; Ji Yong-ho; Song Ho-kyoung; Lee Yu-bin
- Running time: 70-80 minutes
- Production companies: Studio Dragon; Imaginus; Studio PIC; Tree Studio

Original release
- Network: tvN
- Release: October 11 – November 30, 2025

Typhoon Family (Korean: 태풍상사) is a 2025 South Korean television series written by Jang Hyun-sook, directed by Lee Na-jeong and Kim Dong-hwi, and starring Lee Jun-ho and Kim Min-ha. It aired on tvN from October 11, to November 30, 2025, every Saturday and Sunday at 21:10 (KST). It is also available for streaming on Netflix.

== Synopsis ==
It depicts the growth period of a young CEO and the struggles of his family and employees as they strive to protect his father's small company during the 1997 financial crisis.

== Cast and characters ==
=== Main ===
- Lee Jun-ho as Kang Tae-poong

A CEO struggling to save Typhoon Company, the small business his father left behind, during the 1997 financial crisis. Before the crisis hits, he is depicted as a member of the Apgujeong "Orange Tribe," a youth cultural phenomenon in the 1990s, named after the color of the subway line that leads to the district. He is an unemployed horticulture graduate, with a free-spirited youth personality, who is forced to undergo a transformation and take charge of a company with no employees, money, or goods to sell.

- Kim Min-ha as Oh Mi-seon

A bookkeeper at Typhoon Company. She lives a diligent life and works 11 hours a day to support her family as the responsible eldest daughter.

=== Supporting ===
==== People around Tae-poong ====
- Kim Ji-young as Jeong Jeong-mi

Tae-poong's mother and Jin-young's wife.

- Kim Min-seok as Wang Nam-mo

Tae-poong's best friend and Oh Mi-ho's boyfriend.

- Mu Jin-sung as Pyo Hyeon-jun

Director of Pyo Sang Seon, a container shipping company, who is Bak-ho's son and Tae-poong's rival.

- Kim Sang-ho as Pyo Bak-ho

CEO of Pyo Sang Seon and Hyeon-jun's father.

- Park Sung-yeon as Kim Eul-nyeo

Wang Nam-mo's mother.

- Yang Byung-yeol as Yoon-sung

Tae-poong's friend.

==== Employees at Typhoon Company ====
- Lee Chang-hoon as Go Ma-jin

Head of Sales at Typhoon Company.

- Lee Sang-jin as Bae Song-jung

Logistics agent at Typhoon Company.

- Kim Song-il as Gu Myeong-gwan

Managing Director at Typhoon Company.

- Kim Jae-hwa as Cha Seon-taek

Head of General Affairs at Typhoon Company.

==== People around Mi-seon ====
- Kim Young-ok as Yeom Boon-i

Mi-seon's grandmother.

- Kwon Han-sol as Oh Mi-ho

Mi-seon's younger sister and Wang Nam-mo's girlfriend.

- Kwon Eun-seong as Oh Beom

Mi-seon's younger brother.

=== Special appearances ===
- Sung Dong-il as Kang Jin-young

Tae-poong's father and founder of Typhoon Company.

- Im Seong-jae as Kim Chu-seok

Man #1 on dating show

- Jin Seon-kyu as Park Yoon-cheol

CEO of safety shoe brand Shoe Park in Busan

- Kim Hye-eun as Jeong Cha-ran

A currency trader at Hongshin Company

- Lee Jae-kyun as Ryu Hee-gyu

A loan shark in Busann

- Davika Hoorne as Natnicha Nihakam (Nicha)

The youngest daughter of the Nihakam Group

- Jung Soo-young as Cha Ju-joo

A civil servant

== Episodes ==
The titles of show's episodes are inspired from popular South Korean television series of the 1990s.

No.	Title	Directed by	Written by	Original release date
1	"The Season of Typhoon"	Lee Na-jeong; Kim Dong-hwi	Jang Hyun-sook	October 11, 2025
In late 1997, as South Korea teeters on the brink of economic collapse, Typhoon Corporation, a small business in Euljiro, struggles to stay afloat. At its center is CEO Kang Jin-young, who has led the company with quiet integrity for over two decades. While he and his employees endure mounting financial pressure, his son, Kang Tae-poong, lives aimlessly, enjoying the comforts of wealth as a member of the flashy "Abstreet Boys" in Apgujeong. After a fight with a rival leads to his arrest, Jin-young refuses to intervene, believing Tae-poong must face the consequences of his actions. Their relationship, already strained, grows colder—though beneath the surface, affection remains. Tae-poong expresses his care in small, silent acts, like grafting a rose for his father and polishing his shoes each morning. As the economy falters and bankruptcy rumors spread, Jin-young makes a risky business decision in a last effort to protect the company. The pressure overwhelms him, and he collapses from a heart attack. While Tae-poong keeps vigil at the hospital, he briefly steps away and returns to find his father has died. News of South Korea's IMF bailout breaks, signaling both a national crisis and a turning point in Tae-poong's life.
2	"Asphalt Man"	Lee Na-jeong; Kim Dong-hwi	Jang Hyun-sook	October 12, 2025
Upon arriving at the office to settle his father's affairs, Tae-poong is confronted with the harsh realities of the struggling business—unpaid debts, demands from creditors, and a workforce that has mostly resigned due to the financial turmoil. He discovers a secret safe containing bankbooks under the names of employees, a testament to his father's deep care and long-term commitment to his staff. His father also made monthly deposits in his name with a brief message expressing his love and support for Tae-poong's dreams and the importance of people over results. With encouragement and support from accountant Oh Mi-sun, who has been steadfast throughout the crisis, Tae-poong decides to take responsibility and become actively involved in the company. He adopts a more serious and professional demeanor, leaving behind his previously carefree lifestyle, and begins learning the business. At a delivery site, Tae-poong notices signs of financial distress, such as empty files and disconnected phone lines, indicating possible fraud or mismanagement. He takes decisive action to halt a risky delivery by laying in front of the truck to stop it.
3	"Moonlight in Seoul"	Lee Na-jeong; Kim Dong-hwi	Jang Hyun-sook	October 18, 2025
Tae-poong continues to face mounting challenges as he tries to keep Typhoon Corporation afloat. After physically blocking a delivery truck to prevent a failed deal with Daebang Textile, he is forced to unload fabric in an empty parking lot due to the lack of available warehouse space. He spends the night guarding the materials alone. The next day, Pyo Baek-ho offers the use of his old, poorly maintained warehouse. With no other options, Go Ma-jin hurriedly accepts the agreement, despite Tae-poong's skepticism. Heavy rain soon threatens the stored fabric, prompting all employees to work together through the night to protect it. However, a clause in the warehouse contract reveals that goods can be seized after 72 hours of non-payment. Unable to secure a loan or outside help, Tae-poong faces the likely loss of the inventory. As tensions rise, many long-time employees choose to resign, expressing frustration that the company can no longer support them. One urges Kang to file for closure. Despite the departures, Mi-sun remains loyal, insisting the company is worth saving. In a final act of determination, Tae-poong visits her and offers a handwritten business card naming himself "President." He asks her to join him in rebuilding from scratch. She accepts, offering a glimmer of hope amid the company's ongoing crisis.
4	"The Wind Cannot Stop Me"	Lee Na-jeong; Kim Dong-hwi	Jang Hyun-sook	October 19, 2025
Tae-poong discovers that part of a fabric shipment was never unloaded and, noticing the contract lacks unit specifications, recalculates the quantity in yards instead of meters, creating a shortfall. When Pyo tries to return the goods to Italy—violating conditions prohibiting changes in quantity or quality—he's stuck with the inventory and mounting logistics costs. Tae-poong and Mi-sun seize the opportunity, offering to sell him the remaining fabric at triple the original price, forcing Pyo to comply. With the deal closed, they travel to Busan in search of new export ventures, where they meet Jeong Cha-ran, a seasoned international trader. Mi-sun impresses her with sharp mental math, while Tae-poong becomes intrigued by Shoe Park safety shoes after a dramatic live demo by the inventor, Park Yoon-cheol. He impulsively places an order for 500 pairs, earning a rebuke from Mi-sun and doubts from Jeong, who's never heard of the brand. Tae-poong later apologizes to Mi-sun during a quiet moment on the beach. But the reprieve is short lived and on Christmas, Tae-poong's apartment is auctioned off, leaving him and his mother with no home. With nowhere else to go, they return to Typhoon Company. Meanwhile, Pyo begins watching closely as Tae-poong, humbled but undeterred, prepares for his next big move.
5	"Heaven, Where We Are"	Lee Na-jeong; Kim Dong-hwi	Jang Hyun-sook	October 25, 2025
Mi-sun discovers Tae-poong and his mother sleeping at the company and brings them to her humble home. Tae-poong's business takes a devastating turn when he finds out that Shoe Park has gone bankrupt. The owner, Yoon-cheol, had borrowed money from the ruthless loan shark Ryu Hee-gyu and failed to repay it, leading to the loss of both Tae-poong's advance payment and his entire shipment. Determined to set things right, Tae-poong searches for a solution. With Mi-sun's help, he gathers 5 million won—the amount Ryu demanded to release the goods—and travels to Busan to reclaim them. At the factory, Tae-poong discovers Yoon-cheol severely beaten and the place abandoned. Realizing that paying Ryu would only enable further abuse, he refuses to hand over the money. Instead, he chooses to rescue Yoon-cheol, valuing human life over financial loss. Facing Ryu directly, Tae-poong proposes a daring deal—to sell 7,000 pairs of safety shoes for 100 million won, on the condition that Ryu takes the money and disappears—but when Ryu warns that he will take Tae-poong's eyes if the promise is broken, Tae-poong accepts without hesitation.
6	"The Legend of Ambition"	Lee Na-jeong; Kim Dong-hwi	Jang Hyun-sook	October 26, 2025
Misun initially becomes frustrated when 7,000 units arrive in Seoul instead of the agreed 500, concerned about exports and Tae-poong's unilateral decision, but he apologizes and reassures her. Together, Tae-poong and Misun launch an all-out sales campaign, targeting Europe and the United States where worker safety is highly valued. Tae-poong demonstrates the shoes' durability in videos, performing stunts on broken glass and over obstacles, while Misun, using her business English skills, successfully pitches to overseas buyers, resulting in a major contract. An unexpected problem arises when the ship scheduled to transport the shoes refuses to load them, as Tae-poong's company was blacklisted due to the scheming of Pyo Sang-seon. Mi-sun, having learned about the loan certificate and Tae-poong's pledge to give up his eyes, was upset at his reckless approach that ignored the responsibility of a president. Amid tension, Tae-poong and Misun discover the Busan Fish Market and conceive the idea of using ocean-going fishing vessels to transport the shoes.
7	"The Meaning of Life"	Lee Na-jeong; Kim Dong-hwi	Jang Hyun-sook	November 1, 2025
8	"The Bright Days of Youth"	Lee Na-jeong; Kim Dong-hwi	Jang Hyun-sook	November 2, 2025
9	"Walking to the Sky"	Lee Na-jeong; Kim Dong-hwi	Jang Hyun-sook	November 8, 2025
10	"You and I"	Lee Na-jeong; Kim Dong-hwi	Jang Hyun-sook	November 9, 2025
11	"Tomorrow Comes Love"	Lee Na-jeong; Kim Dong-hwi	Jang Hyun-sook	November 15, 2025
12	"My Reason for Living"	Lee Na-jeong; Kim Dong-hwi	Jang Hyun-sook	November 16, 2025
13	"Love Beyond Fear"	Lee Na-jeong; Kim Dong-hwi	Jang Hyun-sook	November 22, 2025
14	"Born in the Wind"	Lee Na-jeong; Kim Dong-hwi	Jang Hyun-sook	November 23, 2025
15	"The Last Match"	Lee Na-jeong; Kim Dong-hwi	Jang Hyun-sook	November 29, 2025
16	"We Met the Bluebird, and Life Goes On"	Lee Na-jeong; Kim Dong-hwi	Jang Hyun-sook	November 30, 2025

== Production ==
=== Development ===
The series is directed by Lee Na-jeong and Kim Dong-hwi, written by Jang Hyun-sook, and co-produced by Imaginus, Studio PIC, and Tree Studio. Writer Jang Hyun-sook shared that the inspiration for the show came from stories told by her seniors during her time as a salesperson, when mobile phones were not yet commonplace. Her intention with the story was to capture the warmth and resilience of people during difficult times.

=== Casting ===
On September 23, 2024, Lee Jun-ho was reportedly in talks to star in the series and positively reviewing the offer. During the show's press conference, director Lee Na-jeong said, "Actor Lee Jun-ho has already reached the peak of K-pop once as a singer, and I believe he has also reached the peak of K-dramas as an actor. Through Typhoon Family, I wanted to show every aspect that an actor standing at the top of both fields can display." On November 11, Keum Sae-rok reportedly received the offer as the female lead and was positively reviewing it but eventually stepped down due to scheduling conflicts.

On January 13, 2025, Kim Min-ha was reportedly considered as Keum's replacement. On February 18, Lee and Kim were officially cast as the lead actors. The next day, Sung Dong-il and Kim Ji-young were confirmed to appear as Lee's parents. On February 20, Kim Min-seok and Mu Jin-sung were cast as Tae-poong's best friend and rival, respectively.

=== Filming ===
Principal photography began on February 27, 2025, and was completed on October 20, 2025.

== Original soundtrack ==
On October 2, 2025, it was announced that both Lee Jun-ho and Kim Min-ha were featured on the series' original soundtrack. On October 11, it was announced that "Eternity", a piano track with vocals from Kim would be released as the series' first OST on October 12 at 18:00 (KST). The seried opening theme, also used in the finale of episode 2, titled "Did You See the Rainbow?" is a soft pop rock track performed by Lee and was released on October 19, 2025. On October 24, it was announced that the series third OST performed by Stray Kids' Han, would be released on October 26. The track titled "Updraft" is described as an alternative rock track featuring punchy drums and powerful distorted guitar. On November 7, it was announced that the series' fifth OST titled "God Bless" performed by Guckkasten's Ha Hyun-woo would be released on November 9. On November 14, it was announced that actor Kim Min-seok lend his voice for the series' sixth OST described as a ballad song, which he also partook in writing and composing and would be released on November 16. On November 28, it was announced that "The Moments" performed by Roy Kim is a song in which a melody that seems to speak casually blends with simple lyrics over a dry-textured sound, would be released on November 30.

=== Album ===
Typhoon Family (Original Soundtrack)

Soundtrack album by Various artists
- Released: December 1, 2025
- Language: Korean
- Labels: Stone Music; Studio Dragon

Singles from Typhoon Family
- 1. "Eternity" Released: October 12, 2025; 2. "Did You See the Rainbow?" Released: October 19, 2025; 3. "Updraft" Released: October 26, 2025; 4. "Once Again, with You" Released: November 2, 2025; 5. "God Bless" Released: November 9, 2025; 6. "Sirius" Released: November 16, 2025; 7. "The Moments" Released: November 30, 2025

Typhoon Family' soundtrack album was released on December 1, 2025; it contains all of the singles and background tracks from the series.

==== Tracklist ====
Typhoon Family track listing
No.	Title	Lyrics	Music	Artist	Length
1.	"Eternity" (영원)	Dailog	Dailog	Kim Min-ha	3:46
2.	"Did You See the Rainbow?"	Phina	Phina; Sean Kimm; Hemian	Lee Jun-ho	3:40
3.	"Updraft" (상승기류)	Qudo (Papermaker); Nynas	Qudo (Papermaker); Nynas	Han	3:02
4.	"Once Again, with You" (한 번 더, 이렇게, 너와)	Brother Su	Gemma; Paprikaa; Iris (Monotree); Brother Su	Lee Won-suk	3:34
5.	"God Bless"	Zozo (Eldorado); D&; Yoon Sun-young	Jung Do-young; Mohan; Zozo (Eldorado)	Ha Hyun-woo	3:20
6.	"Sirius" (늑대별)	Kim Min-seok; Jjunjjeon	Jjunjjeon; Kim; DD	Kim Min-seok	3:40
7.	"The Moments" (순간들)	Shim Hyun-bo	Kwon Ji-yoon; Kim Dong-wook	Roy Kim	3:13
8.	"Good Morning Typhoon Family"		Kim Ji-hye		2:00
9.	"Callin Question"		Kim Dong-in		1:46
10.	"Tomorrow"		Kim Dong-in		2:43
11.	"Accidentally"		Kim Ji-hye		1:58
12.	"Cheesy"		Jeong Na-hyeon		2:17
13.	"Last Train Boy"		Lee Jee-hyang		2:13
14.	"First Petal"		Lee Shin-hee		2:11
15.	"Morning Star"		Dalpalan		2:03
16.	"Shard"		Lee Shin-hee		1:48
17.	"Decoded"		Jeong Na-hyeon		3:14
18.	"Vibe"		Son Hee-nam		1:57
19.	"Duel"		Heo		2:12
20.	"Fall Out"		Son Hee-nam		2:55
21.	"Dockside"		Heo		2:10
22.	"Bond of Debt"		Lee Ji-hyang		1:51
23.	"From Mija"		Dalpan		4:58a

=== Singles ===
Singles included on the album were released from October 12, to November 30, 2025.

Original soundtrack (Part 1–7)

Part 1

All tracks are written by Dailog.

Released on October 12, 2025
No.	Title	Artist	Length
1.	"Eternity" (영원)	Kim Min-ha	3:46
2.	"Eternity" (영원; Inst.)		3:46
Total length:			7:32

Part 2

All lyrics are written by Phina; all music is composed by Phina, Sean Kimm, and Hemian.

Released on October 19, 2025
No.	Title	Artist	Length
1.	"Did You See the Rainbow?"	Lee Jun-ho	3:40
2.	"Did You See the Rainbow?" (Inst.)		3:40
Total length:			7:20

Part 3

All tracks are written by Qudo (Papermaker) and Nynas.

Released on October 26, 2025
No.	Title	Artist	Length
1.	"Updraft" (상승기류)	Han	3:02
2.	"Updraft" (상승기류; Inst.)		3:02
Total length:			6:04

Part 4

All lyrics are written by Brother Su; all music is composed by Gemma, Paprikaa, Iris (Monotree), and Brother Su.

Released on November 2, 2025
No.	Title	Artist	Length
1.	"Once Again, with You" (한 번 더, 이렇게, 너와)	Lee Won-suk	3:34
2.	"Once Again, with You" (한 번 더, 이렇게, 너와; Inst.)		3:34
Total length:			7:08

Part 5

All lyrics are written by Zozo (Eldorado), D&, and Yoon Sun-young; all music is composed by Jung Do-young, Mohan, and Zozo (Eldorado).

Released on November 9, 2025
No.	Title	Artist	Length
1.	"God Bless"	Ha Hyun-woo	3:20
2.	"God Bless" (Inst.)		3:20
Total length:			6:40

Part 6

All lyrics are written by Kim Min-seok and Jjunjjeon; all music is composed by Jjunjjeon, Kim, and DD.

Released on November 16, 2025
No.	Title	Artist	Length
1.	"Sirius" (늑대별)	Kim Min-seok	3:40
2.	"Sirius" (늑대별; Inst.)		3:40
Total length:			7:20

Part 7

All lyrics are written by Shim Hyun-bo; all music is composed by Kwon Ji-yoon and Kim Dong-wook.

Released on November 30, 2025
No.	Title	Artist	Length
1.	"The Moments" (순간들)	Roy Kim	3:13
2.	"The Moments" (순간들; Inst.)		3:13
Total length:			6:26

== Release and promotion ==
Typhoon Family premiered on tvN on October 11, 2025, and airs every Saturday and Sunday. It also available globally on Netflix. On May 30, tvN released an introductory video of the show featuring commentary from Lee Jun-ho and Kim Min-ha as part of a 10-minute preview of its upcoming releases. On August 21, the images from the first script reading were released. On September 8, the first poster featuring Lee Jun-ho as Kang Tae-poong was released. On September 10, a second poster alongside a teaser clip highlighting the impact of the 1997 financial crisis was released. On September 12, stills of Lee Jun-ho and Kim Min-ha, featuring their characters' first meeting was released.

On September 15, a pre-screening of the first episode took place at CGV Yongsan I-Park Mall, with casts and 400 fans, selected based on a motto competition, in attendance. On September 17, the first character posters featuring Lee Jun-ho and Kim Min-ha were released. On September 19, the first stills depicting Lee Jun-ho and Kim Min-seok as members of the Apgujeong Orange tribe were released. On September 25, a preview depicting the transformation in Kang Tae-poong's life due to the crisis was released. On October 1, the show's production presentation was held at the Sindorim The Link Hotel in Seoul, with Lee Jun-ho, Kim Min-ha and director Lee Na-jeong in attendance.

On October 11, a pre-released clip of the first episode showed Tae-poong dancing to Nan by Clon, one of the most popular Korean songs of the era. A donation initiative titled "Support Korea Movement with Typhoon Family" was also announced on the same day. Through this, IBK Industrial Bank will contribute 10 million won for every 10,000 support messages on tvN's website till the end of the show's run, aimed at assisting workers in small and medium-sized enterprises.

On October 21, it was announced that Lee Jun-ho will hold the "Typhoon Family Drama Fan Meeting" starting in Tokyo on December 14, with stops in Taipei on December 27 and 28, Macau on January 17, and concluding in Bangkok on January 31, 2026. The same day, Lotte Wellfood's Kirin Bread brand launched four new varieties of hotteok in collaboration with Typhoon Family, accompanying various giveaways and promotional events in November, coinciding with the show's airing.

On October 23, it was revealed that Lee Jun-ho and Kim Min-ha will appear on Na Yeong-seok's Channel Fullmoon as part of the show's promotion.

On November 21, Studio Dragon announced that a pop-up store for Typhoon Family would be held in South Korea, Japan, and Taiwan as part of the drama's promotional activities. The South Korean pop-up store is scheduled to operate from November 27 to December 5 at The Corner on the sixth floor of The Center in Yongsan I'Park Mall, featuring a retro-themed design reflecting the series' atmosphere.

== Reception ==
=== Critical reception ===
Typhoon Family has received positive attention for its meticulous recreation of 1990s South Korea, resonating strongly with viewers through its authentic portrayal of the era's aesthetics and social atmosphere. The drama's detailed set design, period-accurate props, and use of era-specific elements — such as pagers, cassette tapes, and 1990s television captions — have been praised for evoking a strong sense of nostalgia. Director Lee Na-jeong emphasized the importance of historical accuracy, with the production team sourcing rare items and interviewing people who lived through the 1997 Asian financial crisis to ensure authenticity. Following the premiere, Lee Jun-ho's performance as Kang Tae-poong was widely acclaimed for its emotional depth and subtle expressiveness. Critics and viewers praised his balance of humor, vulnerability, and growth, with writer Jang Hyun noting his ability to embody the "nation's son, boyfriend, and CEO." His portrayal was seen as a key strength of the series, reinforcing his reputation as a versatile and bankable lead. Pop culture critic Jung Deok-hyun said, "Kang Tae-pung is a very three-dimensional character and not an easy one to play. In some ways, it could be a very hopeless situation, but the actor's task was to portray it with the character's optimistic and positive spirit without making it too heavy."

=== Viewership ===
Typhoon Family debuted on Netflix South Korea at No. 2 and has maintained the top position since. In the week of October 13–19, the show ranked No. 5 globally in Netflix's non-English category and was Top 10 overall in 19 countries. In the week of October 20–26, the show ranked No. 7 globally in Netflix's non-English category and was Top 10 overall in 8 countries.

Typhoon Family : South Korea viewers per episode (millions)

Season	Episode number																Average
Season	1	2	3	4	5	6	7	8	9	10	11	12	13	14	15	16	Average
1	1.376	1.616	1.762	2.065	1.646	2.166	1.944	2.103	1.747	2.230	1.988	2.397	1.678	2.289	1.578	2.512	1.944

Source: Audience measurement performed nationwide by Nielsen Korea.

Average TV viewership ratings
Ep.	Original broadcast date	Average audience share (Nielsen Korea)	
Ep.	Original broadcast date	Nationwide	Seoul
1	October 11, 2025	5.874% (1st)	5.730% (1st)
2	October 12, 2025	6.826% (1st)	6.321% (1st)
3	October 18, 2025	7.399% (1st)	7.040% (1st)
4	October 19, 2025	9.012% (1st)	8.498% (1st)
5	October 25, 2025	7.068% (1st)	6.614% (1st)
6	October 26, 2025	8.877% (1st)	8.496% (1st)
7	November 1, 2025	8.246% (1st)	8.054% (1st)
8	November 2, 2025	9.093% (1st)	9.026% (1st)
9	November 8, 2025	7.319% (1st)	7.860% (1st)
10	November 9, 2025	9.440% (1st)	9.568% (1st)
11	November 15, 2025	8.541% (1st)	8.704% (1st)
12	November 16, 2025	9.908% (1st)	9.998% (1st)
13	November 22, 2025	7.345% (1st)	7.264% (1st)
14	November 23, 2025	9.468% (1st)	9.514% (1st)
15	November 29, 2025	6.598% (1st)	6.658% (1st)
16	November 30, 2025	10.342% (1st)	10.619% (1st)
Average		8.210%	8.123%
Special	October 5, 2025	1.325% (6th)	1.273% (3rd)
In the table above, the blue numbers represent the lowest ratings and the red numbers represent the highest ratings.; This series aired on a cable channel/pay TV which normally has a relatively smaller audience compared to free-to-air TV/public broadcasters (KBS, SBS, MBC, and EBS).

=== Accolades ===
Name of the award ceremony, year presented, category, nominee of the award, and the result of the nomination
Award ceremony	Year	Category	Recipient(s)	Result	Ref.
Asia Artist Awards	2025	Grand Prize - Actor of the Year - TV	Lee Jun-ho	Won	
Asia Artist Awards	2025	Best Artist	Lee Jun-ho	Won	
Asia Artist Awards	2025	AAA Fabulous	Lee Jun-ho	Won	
Asia Artist Awards	2025	AAA Popularity Award	Lee Jun-ho	Won	
APAN Star Awards	2025	Top Excellence in Acting Award	Lee Jun-ho	Won	
APAN Star Awards	2025	Best Production Director	Lee Na-jeong	Nominated	
APAN Star Awards	2025	Best Writer	Jang Hyun-seok	Won	
Baeksang Arts Awards	2026	Best Actor	Lee Jun-ho	Nominated	
Brand Customer Loyalty Awards	2026	Best Actor – TV Drama	Lee Junho	Won	
Fundex Awards	2026	Best Actor of TV Drama	Lee Junho	Pending	
