= Reflection of You =

2021 South Korean television series

- Promotional poster
- Hangul: 너를 닮은 사람
- Lit.: Someone Who Looks Like You
- RR: Neoreul dalmeun saram
- MR: Nŏrŭl talmŭn saram
- Genre: Melodrama; Revenge
- Created by: JTBC
- Based on: Someone Who Looks Like You by Jung So-hyeon
- Written by: Yoo Bo-ra
- Directed by: Lim Hyeon-wook
- Starring: Go Hyun-jung; Shin Hyun-been; Kim Jae-young; Choi Won-young
- Composer: Nam Hye-seung
- Country of origin: South Korea
- Original language: Korean
- No. of episodes: 16

Production
- Executive producers: Jo Na-hyeon; Jeong Dae-woong; Jeong Go-eun
- Producers: Park Jae-sam; Kim Ji-woo; Ham Young-hoon; Park Woo-ram; Kim Bo-reum
- Running time: 70 minutes
- Production companies: JTBC Studios; Celltrion Entertainment

Original release
- Network: JTBC
- Release: October 13 – December 2, 2021

Reflection of You (Korean: 너를 닮은 사람) is a South Korean television series directed by Lim Hyeon-wook and starring Go Hyun-jung, Shin Hyun-been, Kim Jae-young, Choi Won-young, and Kim Sang-ho. Based on a novel by writer Jung So-hyeon, the series tells the story of a woman who leaves the conditioned lifestyle of 'wife and mother' for a brief period and becomes faithful to her desires, and another woman who comes in contact with her in that short span and loses the light of her life. It premiered on JTBC on October 13, 2021, and aired every Wednesday and Thursday at 22:30 KST till December 2. The series is available for streaming on Netflix.

== Synopsis ==
Jeong Hee-joo (Go Hyun-jung) had a tough time in her youth, but has become a successful painter and essayist. Her husband, Ahn Hyeon-seong (Choi Won-young), is a rich and powerful person. With their two children, they seem to enjoy a perfect family life, but Hee-joo feels like she is spending her time pointlessly. She meets Gu Hae-won (Shin Hyun-been), an art teacher who lacks worldly means, but is still full of life.

== Cast ==
=== Main ===
- Go Hyun-jung as Jeong Hee-joo

A successful painter and essayist, daughter-in-law of Taerim Corporation.

- Shin Hyun-been as Gu Hae-won

Substitute art teacher at Taerim Girls' Middle School.

- Kim Jae-young as Seo Woo-jae

A sculptor and Hae-won's senior from art school.

- Choi Won-young as Ahn Hyeon-seong

Hee-joo's husband, Principal of Taerim Girls' Middle School and Chairman of Taerim Foundation.

=== Supporting ===
==== People around Jeong Hee-joo ====
- Kim Bo-yeon as Park Young-sun

Hee-joo's mother-in-law, Director of Taerim Hospital.

- Shin Dong-wook as Jeong Seon-woo

Hee-joo's younger brother, physiotherapist at Taerim Hospital.

- Jang Hye-jin as Ahn Min-seo

Hee-joo's sister-in-law, Chief of Neurosurgery at Taerim Hospital.

- Hong Seo-jun as Lee Hyung-ki

Min-seo's husband, a legal counsellor for Taerim Foundation.

- Kim Su-an as Ahn Li-sa

Hee-joo's teenage daughter, a 3rd grader at Taerim Girls' Middle School.

- Kim Dong-ha as Ahn Ho-su

Hee-joo's son, a kindergartener.

- Park Sung-yeon as Lee Dong-mi

Hee-joo's friend, owner of the fishing grounds.

- Yang Jo-ah as Li-sa's new tutor

==== People around Gu Hae-won ====
- Lee Ho-jae as Gu Kwang-mo

Hae-won's grandfather.

- Seo Jeong-yeon as Gu Jeong-yeon

Hae-won's mother, a cosmetics door-to-door seller.

- Kim Sang-ho as Yoon Sang-ho

The owner of a new bar in Hae-won's neighbourhood.

- Shin Hye-ji as Lee Joo-young

Ahn Li-sa's classmate and best-friend, who records everything on her phone.

- Seo Jin-won as Lee Il-seong

A former professional billiards player, who maintains a billiard room. Lee Joo-young's father.

=== Others ===
- Kim Ho-jung as Lee Jung-eun

Director of Hwain Gallery.

- Han Jae-yi as Yoon Jeong

A curator at Hwain Gallery.

- Kang Ae-sim as Ok-su

Mother of Jeong Sun-woo's late friend.

== Production ==
In November 2020, Go Hyun-jung was confirmed to appear in the TV series. The drama serves as her comeback, after a hiatus of more than two years. Her last appearance was in 2019 TV series My Lawyer, Mr. Jo 2: Crime and Punishment. At the end of June 2021, Park Seong-yeon joined the cast. On August 6, it was reported that due to a positive case of COVID-19, the filming was stopped. The main cast of the series tested negative.

The series is based on a novel of the same name by writer Jung So-hyeon. Yoo Bo-ra has adapted the story of the novel and gave it a different perspective.

== Release ==
Reflection of You was released on October 13, 2021, and aired on Wednesday and Thursday at new fall timings of 22:30 KST. The series is also available worldwide on Netflix for streaming.

== Original soundtrack ==
Reflection of You

Soundtrack album by Various
- Released: 2021
- Genre: Soundtrack
- Languages: Korean; English
- Labels: NHN Bucks Co., Ltd.; Most content

=== Part 1 ===
Released on October 14, 2021
No.	Title	Lyrics	Music	Artist	Length
1.	"Moving Away"	Nam Hye-seung, Janet Suhh	Nam Hye-seung, Park Sang-hee	Savina & Drones	3:56
2.	"Moving Away" (Inst.)				3:56

=== Part 2 ===
Released on October 21, 2021
No.	Title	Lyrics	Music	Artist	Length
1.	"The Moment"	Nam Hye-seung, Janet Suhh	Nam Hye-seung, Park Sang-hee	Lim Kim	4:10
2.	"The Moment" (Inst.)				4:10

=== Part 3 ===
Released on October 28, 2021
No.	Title	Lyrics	Music	Artist	Length
1.	"Knocking On"	Nam Hye-seung, Jello Ann	Nam Hye-seung, Park Sang-hee	Janet Suhh	4:01
2.	"Knocking On" (Inst.)				4:01

=== Part 4 ===
Released on November 4, 2021
No.	Title	Lyrics	Music	Artist	Length
1.	"I Am Lost"	Nam Hyeseung, Kim Kyunghee, Jello Ann	Nam Hyeseung, Kim Kyunghee, Jello Ann	Lee Seung-yoon	3:21
2.	"I Am Lost" (Inst.)				3:21

=== Part 5 ===
Released on November 18, 2021
No.	Title	Lyrics	Music	Artist	Length
1.	"Midnight Sun"	Nam Hye-seung, Kim Kyung-hee, Jello Ann	Nam Hye-seung	Kim Kyung-hee	3:32
2.	"Midnight Sun" (Inst.)		Nam Hye-seung		3:32

== Viewership ==
Audience response

The series climbed up in Netflix's rankings to figure in top ten in the week ending on November 14 in South Korea.

Reflection of You : South Korea viewers per episode (thousands)

Season	Episode number																Average
Season	1	2	3	4	5	6	7	8	9	10	11	12	13	14	15	16	Average
1	670	N/A	549	550	N/A	N/A	N/A	N/A	N/A	N/A	N/A	578	510	N/A	564	N/A	N/A

Source: Audience measurement performed nationwide by Nielsen Korea

Average TV viewership ratings
Ep.	Original broadcast date	Title	Average audience share (Nielsen Korea)	
Ep.	Original broadcast date	Title	Nationwide	Seoul
1	October 13, 2021	"Someone Like You"	3.636% (7th)	4.109% (4th)
2	October 14, 2021	"Your Name Is"	2.592% (11th)	3.335% (5th)
3	October 20, 2021	"My Personal Story"	2.899% (8th)	3.242% (5th)
4	October 21, 2021	"What Shouldn't Be Loved"	2.722% (11th)	3.164% (4th)
5	October 27, 2021	"Nobody Lied"	2.359% (14th)	2.706% (9th)
6	October 28, 2021	"That's not How Love Ends"	2.700% (11th)	3.593% (5th)
7	November 3, 2021	"If Love Is Beginning of Misfortune"	2.213% (13th)	2.506% (NR)
8	November 4, 2021	"Us, Here Again"	2.311% (15th)	2.793% (NR)
9	November 10, 2021	"Wavering Without the Wind"	2.300% (15th)	3.041% (10th)
10	November 11, 2021	"Point of No Return"	2.039% (19th)	2.841% (8th)
11	November 17, 2021	"Anytime, Anyone, Can be a Monster"	2.437% (11th)	2.787% (7th)
12	November 18, 2021	"Not Hell Yet"	2.790% (11th)	3.568% (NR)
13	November 24, 2021	"Sometimes Do Not"	2.666% (12th)	3.148% (9th)
14	November 25, 2021	"Did Not Love Anyone"	2.628% (13th)	3.303% (6th)
15	December 1, 2021	"Breakups are Harder Than"	2.723% (12th)	3.165% (8th)
16	December 2, 2021	"After the Strom"	3.178% (13th)	4.154% (4th)
Average			2.637%	3.216%
In the table above, the blue numbers represent the lowest ratings and the red numbers represent the highest ratings.; This drama airs on a cable channel/pay TV which normally has a relatively smaller audience compared to free-to-air TV/public broadcasters (KBS, SBS, MBC and EBS).

== Awards and nominations ==
Name of the award ceremony, year presented, category, nominee of the award, and the result of the nomination
Award ceremony	Year	Category	Nominee / Work	Result	Ref.
APAN Star Awards	2022	Excellence Award, Actress in a Miniseries	Shin Hyun-been	Nominated	
Korea Drama Awards	2022	Top Excellence Award, Actress	Shin Hyun-been	Won	
