= Mine (TV series) =

2021 South Korean mystery television series

- Promotional poster
- Also known as: Blue Diamond
- Hangul: 마인
- RR: Main
- MR: Main
- Genre: Drama; Mystery; Thriller; Black comedy
- Created by: Kim Jae-hyun (tvN); Kim Young-gyu (Studio Dragon)
- Written by: Baek Mi-kyung
- Directed by: Lee Na-jeong
- Starring: Lee Bo-young; Kim Seo-hyung; Cha Hak-yeon; Park Hyuk-kwon
- Composer: Dalpalan
- Country of origin: South Korea
- Original language: Korean
- No. of episodes: 16

Production
- Executive producer: Kim Geon-hong
- Producers: Lee Jin-seok; Shin Ye-ji
- Camera setup: Single-camera
- Running time: 70 minutes
- Production company: JS Pictures

Original release
- Network: tvN
- Release: May 8 – June 27, 2021

Mine (Korean: 마인) is a 2021 South Korean television series directed by Lee Na-jung, and starring Lee Bo-young, Kim Seo-hyung, Lee Hyun-wook, and Ok Ja-yeon. The story revolves around strong women who free themselves from the prejudices of society to find their true 'mine'. It also concerns the lives of members of a wealthy family and their servants. Mine is the first Korean drama to feature a lesbian as a lead character.

The series premiered on tvN on May 8, 2021, and aired every Saturday and Sunday from 21:00 (KST) until June 27, 2021. Netflix acquired the exclusive rights to international distribution.

It ended on June 27 with an average viewership of 8.208% nationwide and 9.078% for the metropolitan area, and an average viewership of 1.826 million audience per episode. The last episode recorded an average of 10.5% and 11.2% for households nationwide and metropolitan area respectively, breaking its own highest ratings in both segments.

== Synopsis ==
The series glimpses into the high society's lifestyle and follows strong and ambitious women who are trying to find their real 'mine'.

Seo Hi-soo, a former top actress and now the second daughter-in-law of the Hyowon Group chaebol, and Jung Seo-hyun, the first daughter-in-law of Hyowon Group, are trying to find their true identities.

== Cast ==
=== Main ===
- Lee Bo-young as Seo Hi-soo, former top actress and Hyowon Group's second daughter-in-law
- Kim Seo-hyung as Jung Seo-hyun, Hyowon Group's first daughter-in-law and director of Seohyun Gallery
  - Cho Hye-won as young Jung Seo-hyun
- Ok Ja-yeon as Kang Ja-kyung, Han Ha-joon's tutor

=== Supporting ===
==== Hyowon family ====
- Lee Hyun-wook as Han Ji-yong, second son of the Hyowon family and Seo Hi-soo's husband
- Park Hyuk-kwon as Han Jin-ho, eldest son of the Hyowon family and Jung Seo-hyun's husband
- Cha Hak-yeon as Han Soo-hyuk, Han Jin-ho's son from his first marriage and Jung Seo-hyun's stepson
- Jung Hyeon-jun as Han Ha-joon, Han Ji-yong's son from a previous relationship and Seo Hi-soo's stepson
- Park Won-sook as Yang Soon-hye, mother-in-law of Jung Seo-hyun and Seo Hi-soo
- Jung Dong-hwan as Chairman Han Suk-chul, father-in-law of Jung Seo-hyun and Seo Hi-soo
- Kim Hye-hwa as Han Jin-hee, only daughter of the Hyowon family
- Jo Eun-sol as Park Jung-do, Han Jin-hee's husband

==== Hyowon Mansion's staff ====
- Jung Yi-seo as Kim Yu-yeon, an orphan who used to be a teacher at the Ilsin Foundation and the new housemaid at Cadenza
- Park Sung-yeon as Butler Joo, she is responsible for management and housekeeping at Hyowon Mansion
- Lee Joong-ok as Kim Seong-tae, the only male staff member at Hyowon Mansion
- Jo Yoon-seo as Oh Soo-young, Seo Hi-soo's personal assistant
- Yoon Seon-ah as Hwang Gyeong-hye, a housemaid
- Kim Nam-jin as Ko Mi-jin, a housemaid

==== People around the Hyowon family ====
- Ye Soo-jung as Mother Emma/Seol-hwa, founder of Ilsin Foundation, who acts as therapist for members of the Hyowon family
- Kim Jung-hwa as Suzy Choi, a painter and Jung Seo-hyun's first love
- Kim Yi-seo as young Suzy Choi
- Choi Soo-im as Kim Mi-ja, Chairman Han's dead mistress and Han Ji-yong's biological mother
- Song Seon-mi as Seo Jin-kyeong, mistress of Yang Soon-hye's older brother and director of Hawon Gallery
- Jang Ha-eun as Roh A-rim, eldest granddaughter of the Yeongwon Group and Han Soo-hyuk's intended fiancée

==== Hyowon Group's employees ====
- Kim Woo-dam as Secretary Seo, Jung Seo-hyun's secretary
- Lee Ho-suk as Secretary Jo, Han Ji-yong's secretary
- Ma Jung-pil as Secretary Cha
- Park Sang-yong as member of the Legal Team
- Kim Soo-hyun as member of the PR Team

=== Others ===
- Choi Young-joon as Baek Dong-hun, a detective
- Ahn Ji-hye as deputy director of Seohyun Gallery
- Kim Yoon-ji as Jasmin, a member of the Bible study group
- Oh Jung-yeon as Mi-joo, a member of the Bible study group
- Song Seung-hwan as autistic teen artist
- Kim Ji-woo as Ji-won, Han Ha-joon's classmate
- Kwon So-hyun as Ji-won's mother
- Gil Geum-seung as Mr. Kwak, an underground fighter

== Production ==
In October 2020, it was reported that writer Baek Mi-kyeong and director Lee Na-jeong were in talks with Lee Bo-young and Kim Seo-hyung for appearing in a women oriented drama initially known as 'Blue Diamond'.

On 29 December, tvN channel reported that Lee Bo-young, Kim Seo-hyung, Ok Ja-yeon, Park Hyuk-kwon and Park Won-sook confirmed their appearance in the drama, and Ko So-young, who has earlier received the proposal has refused the appearance due to scheduling conflicts.

Cha Hak-yeon joined the cast in January 2021.

On March 25, stills from script reading were released by the production crew.

== Awards and nominations ==
Year	Award	Category	Recipient(s)	Result	Ref.
2021	Metro K-Drama Awards	Most Stylish Female in a Drama	Kim Seo-hyung (as Jung Seo-hyun)	Won	
2022	58th Baeksang Arts Awards	Best Director	Lee Na-jung	Nominated	
2022	58th Baeksang Arts Awards	Best Supporting Actor	Lee Hyun-wook	Nominated	
2022	58th Baeksang Arts Awards	Best Supporting Actress	Ok Ja-yeon	Nominated	
2022	58th Baeksang Arts Awards	Best Screenplay	Baek Mi-kyung	Nominated	

== Episodes ==
No.	Title	Directed by	Written by	Original release date	South Korea viewers (millions)
1	"The Strangers"	Lee Na-jung	Baek Mi-kyung	May 8, 2021	1.464
2	"The Wings of Icarus"	Lee Na-jung	Baek Mi-kyung	May 9, 2021	1.349
3	"The Grey Area"	Lee Na-jung	Baek Mi-kyung	May 15, 2021	1.261
4	"Strait is The Gate"	Lee Na-jung	Baek Mi-kyung	May 16, 2021	1.841
5	"The Sixth Sense"	Lee Na-jung	Baek Mi-kyung	May 22, 2021	1.599
6	"'The Uncomfortable Truth and False Peace'"	Lee Na-jung	Baek Mi-kyung	May 23, 2021	1.854
7	"Love is Just a Dream"	Lee Na-jung	Baek Mi-kyung	May 29, 2021	1.850
8	"How an Elephant Gets Through a Door"	Lee Na-jung	Baek Mi-kyung	May 30, 2021	2.083
9	"A Toast to the Devil"	Lee Na-jung	Baek Mi-kyung	June 5, 2021	1.833
10	"The Real Mother"	Lee Na-jung	Baek Mi-kyung	June 6, 2021	2.127
11	"Some Enchanted Week"	Lee Na-jung	Baek Mi-kyung	June 12, 2021	1.964
12	"Crime and Sin"	Lee Na-jung	Baek Mi-kyung	June 13, 2021	2.240
13	"They All Lie"	Lee Na-jung	Baek Mi-kyung	June 19, 2021	2.045
14	"Fighting in the Dark"	Lee Na-jung	Baek Mi-kyung	June 20, 2021	2.109
15	"The Judges"	Lee Na-jung	Baek Mi-kyung	June 26, 2021	1.911
16	"Glorious Women"	Lee Na-jung	Baek Mi-kyung	June 27, 2021	2.429

== Original soundtrack ==
Mine

Soundtrack album by Various
- Released: 2021
- Genre: Soundtrack
- Languages: Korean; English
- Label: Genie Music/Stone Music Entertainment

=== Part 1 ===
Released on May 23, 2021
No.	Title	Lyrics	Music	Artist	Length
1.	"This is Mine"	Min Kim	Min Kim, Taylor	Lee Seung-yoon	3:18
2.	"This is Mine" (Inst.)				3:18

=== Part 2 ===
Released on May 30, 2021
No.	Title	Lyrics	Music	Artist	Length
1.	"Mine"	Mikyung Baek	ID:Earth, Kim Jae-jong, Jerry Carrot	ID:Earth (Ideas)	3:00
2.	"Mine" (Inst.)				3:00

=== Part 3 ===
Released on June 6, 2021
No.	Title	Lyrics	Music	Artist	Length
1.	"In a Dream" (꿈에서)	Kim Tae-young, December 32	Kim Tae-young, December 32	SAya	4:10
2.	"In a Dream" (Inst.)				4:10

=== Part 4 ===
Released on June 13, 2021
No.	Title	Lyrics	Music	Artist	Length
1.	"Dear Son"	Choi In-young	Choi In-young	Park Seon-ye	3:08
2.	"Dear Son" (Inst.)		Choi In-young		3:08

=== Part 5 ===
Released on June 20, 2021
No.	Title	Lyrics	Music	Artist	Length
1.	"Winner"	DOKO	DOKO	Kim Yoon-ah (Jaurim)	2:59
2.	"Winner" (Inst.)		DOKO		2:59

== Reception ==
=== Audience response ===
As per Nielsen Korea, the last (16th) episode aired on June 27, 2021, logged a national average viewership of 10.512% with 2.42 million viewers watching the episode, thereby breaking its own highest ratings.

=== Viewership ===
Mine : South Korea viewers per episode (millions)

Season	Episode number																Average
Season	1	2	3	4	5	6	7	8	9	10	11	12	13	14	15	16	Average
1	1.464	1.349	1.261	1.841	1.599	1.854	1.850	2.083	1.833	2.127	1.964	2.240	2.045	2.109	1.911	2.429	1.872

Source: Audience measurement performed nationwide by Nielsen Korea

Average TV viewership ratings
Ep.	Original broadcast date	Title	Average audience share (Nielsen Korea)	
Ep.	Original broadcast date	Title	Nationwide	Seoul
1	May 8, 2021	The Strangers (낯선 사람들)	6.565% (1st)	7.906% (1st)
2	May 9, 2021	The Wings of Icarus (이카루스의 날개)	6.017% (1st)	6.836% (1st)
3	May 15, 2021	The Grey Area (회색의 영역)	5.578% (1st)	6.399% (1st)
4	May 16, 2021	Strait is The Gate (좁은문)	7.373% (1st)	7.822% (1st)
5	May 22, 2021	The Sixth Sense (여섯 번째 감각)	6.943% (1st)	7.717% (1st)
6	May 23, 2021	The Uncomfortable Truth and False Peace (불편한 진실 거짓된 평화)	8.173% (1st)	8.678% (1st)
7	May 29, 2021	Love is Just a Dream (꿈속의 사랑)	8.627% (1st)	9.959%(1st)
8	May 30, 2021	How an Elephant Gets Through a Door (코끼리가 문을 나가는 방법)	9.023%(1st)	9.817% (1st)
9	June 5, 2021	A Toast to the Devil (악마와 축배를)	8.421% (1st)	9.807% (1st)
10	June 6, 2021	The Real Mother (진짜 엄마)	9.354% (1st)	10.016% (1st)
11	June 12, 2021	Some Enchanted Week (매혹의 일주일)	8.314% (1st)	9.030% (1st)
12	June 13, 2021	Crime and Sin (죄 와 죄)	9.487% (1st)	9.703% (1st)
13	June 19, 2021	They All Lie (모두가 거짓말을 하고 있다)	8.821% (1st)	9.792% (1st)
14	June 20, 2021	Fighting in the Dark (보이지 않는 것과의 싸움)	9.395% (1st)	9.957% (1st)
15	June 26, 2021	The Judges (심판자들)	8.720% (1st)	10.589% (1st)
16	June 27, 2021	Glorious Women (빛나는 여인들)	10.512% (1st)	11.221% (1st)
Average			8.208%	9.078%
In the table above, the blue numbers represent the lowest ratings and the red numbers represent the highest ratings.; This series aired on a cable channel/pay TV which normally has a relatively smaller audience compared to free-to-air TV/public broadcasters (KBS, SBS, MBC and EBS).
