= Yoo Bo-ra =

South Korean screenwriter

- 유보라
- Born: South Korea
- Occupation: Screenwriter
- Years active: 2017–present
- Employer: Studio Dragon
- Organization(s): Korea Television and Radio Writers Association (KTRWA)
- Notable work: Reflection of You

Korean name
- Hangul: 유보라
- RR: Yu Bora
- MR: Yu Pora

Yoo Bo-ra (Korean: 유보라) is a South Korean film and television screenwriter. Yoo debuted as screenwriter on terrestrial television with the KBS Drama Special in 2012. Yoo is best known for her work as scriptwriter of KBS television series Secret Love (2013), JTBC mini-series Rain or Shine (2017) and Reflection of You (2021), as well as her critically acclaim film Snowy Road (2017).

Before Yoo made her feature drama debut, she began her career as a one-act drama writer at KBS. Her stories focused on social issues. She wrote several KBS Drama Specials, including "A Spoonbill Flies Away," "Do You Know Taekwondo?," "Sangkwoni," "Yeonwoo's Summer," and "Youth."

== Early life and education ==
During her time as an undergraduate student, Yoo pursued a major in fiction within the creative writing department. Throughout her college years, she had the fortunate opportunity to make her literary debut at the Spring Festival. However, her subsequent endeavors did not yield favorable results, as she faced repeated failures in full-length novel contests. While grappling with these setbacks, she would examine award-winning works and wonder why hers did not achieve similar success. There were moments when she contemplated the reasons behind her failures, eventually leading to a realization after going through that challenging period.

After completing her undergraduate studies, Yoo enrolled in Dongguk University's where she focused on screenwriting. Despite exploring directing, she concluded that it was not the right path for her. Consequently, she decided to condense the full-length screenplay she had written for her graduation and submitted it to a one-act play contest.

In 2008, Yoo collaborated with Park Jung-bum, a fellow alumnus of Dongguk University's Graduate School, on a short independent film script titled 125JEON Seung-chul. Directed by Park Jung-bum, the film served as an entry for the 34th Seoul Independent Film Festival in 2008. It depicts the story of Seung-cheol, a North Korean defector portrayed by Park Jung-bum, who has recently left Hanawon. Seung-cheol spends his days in a state of confusion and disorientation in an empty rental apartment. The detective in charge of Seung-cheol introduces him to a factory, but he faces rejection due to his status as a North Korean defector.

In 2011, Yoo won the Grand Prize in the KBS 24th TV One-act Drama Contest for her script, "A Spoonbill Flies Away." "A Spoonbill Flies Away" was evaluated as a delicate and lyrical expression of the process of a young man reflecting on his love through his father's pure love. KBS announced that a total of 2,943 works applied for the 2011 one-act play script contest, and there were many works with diverse perspectives, including works with strong topicality that criticized reality, human plays that allowed one to feel family love, and genre works based on unique ideas. The winning writers were set to work as KBS intern writers, and the winning works were set to be broadcast on KBS Drama Special in 2012.

== Career ==
=== Early career ===
The script written by Yoo was selected to get production support work in from the Korea Creative Content Agency for the one-act play category. It was helmed by Director Kim Young-gyun and developed into the KBS2 drama special "Do You Know Taekwondo?" The drama follows Do-hyeon (played by Lim Ji-gyu), an unknown action actor who unexpectedly becomes a taekwondo instructor at his alma mater. He takes charge of three problem children who have given up on school and three underachievers with little talent. The cast includes Lim Ji-gyu, Niel, Han Yeo-reum, Kim Hee-won, Kim So-young, Yoon Park, Ki Joo-bong, Lee Chae-eun, and Lee Dae-hoon. The drama was broadcast at 11:45 pm on October 7, 2012.

Yoo's winning script, "A Spoonbill Flies Away," was adapted into a one-act drama as part of the lineup for the KBS 2012 Drama Special. The four winning works from the previous year's One-Act Play Script Contest were broadcast every Sunday at 11:15 pm for four consecutive weeks, starting from October 28, 2012. "A Spoonbill Flies Away," directed by Jeon San, was aired on the second Sunday in the first week of November.

Yoo's one-act drama titled "Sangkwon," directed by Kim Jin-woo, was the 23rd work of KBS2's Drama Special Season 3. Lee Moon-sik played the lead role of Sang-kwon, a construction worker who has lost his family and struggles with memory loss when drunk. Lee Moon-sik's performance was praised. Due to the small production budget of the drama, he was willing to cut his fee by more than half. It aired on December 16, 2012, and achieved the highest viewership rating of all the drama specials in Season 3.

In 2013, Yoo also wrote KBS drama special one-act play 'Yeonwoo's Summer'. The story follows Yeon-woo (Han Ye-ri), an indie band singer-songwriter who took over the family business after her father died, runs a home appliance repair shop, and works part-time at a cafe while going to work to replace her mother, Park Soon-im (Kim Hye-ok), a building sanitation worker who was hospitalized in a traffic accident. It begins. Yeonwoo meets her elementary school classmate Yoon Ji-wan (Lim Se-mi), who works as an announcer at this company, and sets up a blind date with Kim Yun-hwan (Han Joo-wan), the son of Ji-wan's father's friend, on Ji-wan's behalf.

=== Mini-series debut ===
Yoo made her debut in the 2013 mini-series Secret Love, which she co-wrote with Choi Ho-cheol. It was a project planned by Director Lee Eung-bok since October 2012, while still working on School 2013. Director Lee was impressed by Choi Ho-cheol's award-winning script from the KBS Miniseries Script Contest in 2012. He had been preparing for nearly a year, holding frequent meetings with Choi Ho-cheol. Chief Producer Hwang Ui-kyung recommended Yoo to join the project. The roles were well-defined, with writer Yoo Bo-ra responsible for infusing the emotional and feminine elements, while writer Choi Ho-cheol handled the mystery and thriller aspects. Due to joining a pre-planned work, Yoo had to write the script in a hurry.

Secret Love starred Hwang Jung-eum, Ji Sung, Bae Soo-bin, and Lee Da-hee in the lead roles. The 16-episode series aired on KBS2 from September 25 to November 14, 2013, with episodes broadcast on Wednesdays and Thursdays at 21:55. Secret Love garnered positive reviews consistently for its well-structured portrayal of a passionate melodrama involving four characters intertwined with revenge and desire. It secured the top position among Wednesday-Thursday dramas, achieving a viewership rating of 16%. Additionally, it successfully held its ground in direct competition with writer Kim Eun-sook's The Heirs (SBS).

The success of Secret Love was attributed to the combined talents of promising new writers and the planning skills of the production team. Hwang Eui-kyung, the Chief Producer of the KBS drama department, acknowledged that broadcasting companies traditionally hesitated to hire new writers, especially for mini-series, due to the financial implications and increased risk. However, in this case, they took a chance on a new writer who had demonstrated their capabilities in one-act plays and internal planning. This decision held significance as it was a single cohesive project that yielded positive results.

After Secret Love, Yoo received love calls for her from several production companies, but she chose a one-act play that was her basic. Yoo wrote KBS 2TV Drama Special 2014: 18 Years Old.

In early 2014, Yoo started planned Snowy Road with director Lee Na-jeong. Set in 1944 at the end of the Japanese colonial period, Snow Road is a work depicting the reality that Jongbun (Kim Hyang-gi) and Young-ae (Kim Sae-ron) had to face as comfort women. The actual filming period for Snowy Road lasted only 17 days. It was first premiered as a two-part television drama special on KBS1 in 2015, and then was re-edited for theatrical screening.

KBS initially planned the project as a film, bringing together broadcasting and film staff to collaborate on the production. The decision was influenced by the higher chances of film being screened in Japan, particularly at film festivals, including those with a focus on human rights. The primary goal was to increase viewership, raise awareness, and educate a wider audience about the issue through the film. The theatrical cut was first showcased at the 16th Jeonju International Film Festival. The film version was eventually released nationwide on March 1, 2017, coinciding with South Korea's Independence Movement Day, which commemorates the 1919 March 1st Movement. In 2016, Snowy Road won the Prix Italia Award in the TV Drama/TV Movie category at the 67th Prix Italia Awards.

In 2014, Yoo collaborated again with Park Jung-bum after 4 years, on the independent film script Alive. Directed by Park Jung-bum, the film is a mystery thriller that portrays a dramatized version of a real-life murder case that took place at a raw fish restaurant in Gangwon-do. In 2015, the film received the JPM Best Feature Film Award at the 16th Jeonju International Film Festival.

The drama Just Between Lovers is a work based on the Sewol ferry accident, Sampoong Department Store collapse, and Seongsu Bridge collapse. It is a drama that provides comfort by depicting post-traumatic syndrome in Korea. A story has no choice but to reflect the times, whether consciously or unconsciously, and I like that this is always clearly felt in the author's writing.

== Filmography ==
=== Film ===
Feature film credits
Year	Title		Credited as		Director	Notes	Ref.
Year	English	Korean	Adaptation	Original script	Director	Notes	Ref.
2008	125 Jeon Seung-cheol	125 전승철	—N/a	Yes	Park Jung-bum	Short film	
2015	Alive	산다	Yes	—N/a	Park Jung-bum		
2017	Snowy Road	눈길	—N/a	Yes	Lee Na-jeong	Re-leased and re-edited version	

=== Television series ===
Television drama credits
Year	Title		Network	Credited as			Ref.
Year	English	Korean	Network	Adaptation	Original Script	Creator	Ref.
2012	KBS Drama Special - A Spoonbill Flies Away	KBS 드라마 스페셜 - 저어새 날아가다	KBS2	—N/a	Yes	—N/a	
2012	KBS Drama Special - Do You Know Taekwondo?	KBS 드라마 스페셜 - 태권, 도를 아십니까	KBS2	—N/a	Yes	—N/a	
2012	KBS Drama Special - Sangkwoni (Business District)	KBS 드라마 스페셜 - 상권이	KBS2	—N/a	Yes	—N/a	
2013	KBS Drama Special - Yeonwoo's Summer	KBS 드라마 스페셜 - 연우의 여름	KBS1	—N/a	Yes	—N/a	
2013	Secret Love	비밀	KBS2	—N/a	Co-author	—N/a	
2014	KBS Drama Special - Youth	KBS 드라마 스페셜 - 18세	KBS2	—N/a	Yes	—N/a	
2015	Snowy Road	눈길	KBS1	—N/a	Yes	—N/a	
2017	Rain or Shine	그냥 사랑하는 사이	JTBC	—N/a	Yes	—N/a	
2021	Reflection of You	너를 닮은 사람	JTBC	Yes	—N/a	—N/a	
2024	Hide	하이드	JTBC	—N/a		Yes	

=== Web Series ===
Web series credits
Year	Title		OTT	Credited as				Ref.
Year	English	Korean	OTT	Director	Scriptwriter	Creator	Planner	Ref.
2019	Love Alarm	좋아하면 울리는	Netflix	Lee Na-jeong	Lee Ah-yeon; Seo Bo-ra	Yes	Studio Dragon	

== Accolades ==
=== Awards and nominations ===
List of award
Award ceremony	Year	Category	Recipient	Result	Ref.
24th TV One-act Drama Contest	2011	Best Prize	A Spoonbill Flies Away (Note: script Contest version)	Won	
2nd Asia Rainbow TV Awards	2014	Outstanding Modern Drama	Secret Love	Won	
67th Locarno International Film Festival	2014	Young Critics Award	Alive (Note: Yoo Bo-ra adapted script by Park Jung-bum)	Won	
29th Mar del Plata International Film Festival	2014	Obra Cine Award for Best First or Second Feature	Alive	Won	
25th Singapore International Film Festival	2014	Silver Screen Awards for Asian Feature Film; Special Mention	Alive	Won	
9th Asia Pacific Screen Awards	2015	Best Feature Film	Alive	Nominated	
9th Asia Pacific Screen Awards	2015	Jury Grand Prize	Alive	Won	
3rd Wildflower Film Awards	2016	Grand Prize	Alive	Won	
3rd Wildflower Film Awards	2016	Best Screenplay	Alive	Nominated	

=== Listicles ===
Name of publisher, year listed, name of listicle, and placement
Publisher	Year	Listicle	Placement	Ref.
Cine21	2023	22 Writers	Shortlisted	
