= Park Sung-yeon =

South Korean actress (born 1975)

- Born: Park Sung-yeon; 24 June 1975 (age 51); South Korea
- Other name: Park Sung-yun
- Education: Dankook University (Department of Theater and Film)
- Occupation: Actress
- Years active: 1998–present
- Agent: Cosmo Entertainment
- Known for: Love Alarm; Abyss; Do Do Sol Sol La La Sol; Behind Your Touch

Park Sung-yeon (born 24 June 1975) is a South Korean actress. She is known for her roles in dramas such as Love Alarm, Mine, Abyss, Reflection of You, Do Do Sol Sol La La Sol and Record of Youth. She also appeared in movies The Silenced, Peppermint Candy, The Wailing, The Client, Vanishing Time: A Boy Who Returned and Believer.

== Filmography ==
=== Television series ===
Year	Title	Role	Ref.
2016	Dear My Friends	Hee-ja's daughter-in-law	
2019	Possessed	Ji-sook	
2019	Abyss	Park Mi-soon	
2019	Love Alarm	Ko Hyun-sook	
2019	Arthdal Chronicles	Hae Yeo-bi	
2019	Diary of a Prosecutor	Kang Young-hee	
2020	Record of Youth	Lee Kyung-mi	
2020	Do Do Sol Sol La La Sol	Seung-gi's mother	
2020	SF8	Manxin church member	
2021	Mine	Joo Min-soo	
2021	Reflection of You	Lee Dong-mi	
2021	KBS Drama Special: "Siren"	Seo Hye-seon	
2021	Melancholia	Yoo Seon-ah	
2022	Our Blues	Family court Investigator	
2022	Bloody Heart	Court Lady Choi	
2022	Never Give Up	Sharon Oh	
2022	Glitch	Choi Seong-joo	
2023	Daily Dose of Sunshine	Internal medicine head nurse	
2023	Decoy	Han Da-jung	
2023	Behind Your Touch	Jung Hyeon-ok	
2024	Queen of Tears	Kang-mi	
2024	Missing Crown Prince	Kim Sang-gung	
2025	Pump Up the Healthy Love	Im Seong-im	

=== Film ===
Year	Title		Role
Year	English	Korean	Role
2000	Peppermint Candy	박하사탕	Factory worker
2010	Secret Reunion	의형제	Han-gyoo's wife
2011	Re-encounter	혜화,동	Han-soo's sister
2011	The Client	의뢰인	Chul-min's wife
2011	Ordinary Days	평범한 날들	Drunk girl
2012	The Night of the Witness	목격자의 밤	Ms. Yeon
2013	The Gifted Hands	사이코메트리	Eun-ji's mother
2015	Heels Over Head	머리 위로 발 뒤꿈치	Sung-yoon
2015	The Silenced	경성학교: 사라진 소녀들	Life teacher
2016	The Wailing	곡성	Kwon Myeong-joo
2016	Vanishing Time: A Boy Who Returned	가려진 시간	Tae-shik's mother
2018	Believer	독전	Sign language interpreter
2018	The Accidental Detective 2: In Action	탐정: 리턴즈	Nurse
2018	Believer: Extended Cut	독전: 익 스텐 디드 컷	Sign language interpreter
2018	Adulthood	어른도감	Somers
2018	Last Child	살아남은 아이	Hyun-kyu's wife
2019	By Quantum Physics: A Nightlife Venture	양자물리학	Yoon-shik's assistant clerk
2019	Kim Ji-young: Born 1982	82년생 김지영	Team leader Kim
2020	Diva	디바	Detective Oh
2022	Take Care of My Mom	엄마를 부탁해	Mi-sook
2022	How Have You Been	오랜만이다	Yeong-hee
2023	Soulmate	소울메이트	Seong-yeon

== Awards and nominations ==
Name of the award ceremony, year presented, category, nominee of the award, and the result of the nomination
Award ceremony	Year	Category	Result	Ref.
5th Korea Drama Awards	2012	Best New Actress Award	Won	
Korea Drama Awards	2019	Best New Actress	Won	
