= Ok Ja-yeon =

South Korean actress (born 1988)

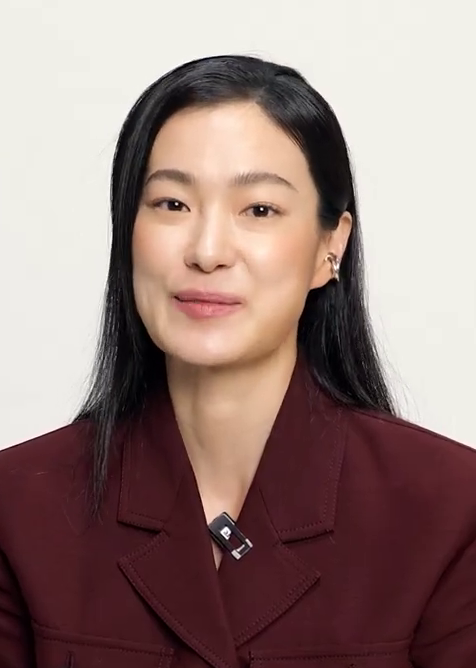
- Ok in 2024
- Born: December 19, 1988 (age 37); Suncheon, South Korea
- Education: Seoul National University (Department of Aesthetics)
- Years active: 2012–present
- Agent: Media Lab SISO

Korean name
- Hangul: 옥자연
- RR: Ok Jayeon
- MR: Ok Chayŏn

Ok Ja-yeon (Korean: 옥자연; born December 19, 1988) is a South Korean actress.

== Early life ==
Ok was born and raised in Suncheon by school teacher parents.

Ok described herself as not studious in her younger years, but due to the influence of her friend in middle school, she started taking her studies seriously. She then excelled in academics all throughout middle school and high school. She was also a member of the theater club in middle school, but had no desire of becoming an actress during that time.

Ok initially wanted to become a lawyer and planned to study law for her undergraduate degree, but her grades did not meet the admission requirement of Seoul National University for the said degree. Due to her interest in the arts, she then decided to major in aesthetics and planned to pursue law later.

In her third year of university, Ok watched the play Snow In March and was moved by the performance of actor Jang Minho. She cited it as the reason why her love for theater and acting grew and her dream of becoming an actress was born.

== Career ==
Ok decided to change careers and pursued acting at 25 years old (in Korean age). She made her acting debut in the theater play Guest in 2012.

For almost 10 years, Ok only played minor and supporting roles in various stage plays, films, and TV dramas. In 2021, she landed her first main role in the TV series Mine which became a hit and Ok gained recognition for her villain character. For her performance, she received a Best Supporting Actress nomination at the 58th Baeksang Arts Awards.

Ok received her first acting award at the 23rd Jeonju International Film Festival after being named Best Actress for her work in the independent film The Archeology of Love.

In April 2023, Ok was named as a judge at the 24th Jeonju International Film Festival for the International Competition category.

In 2025, Ok acted in the Korean premiere of the British play The Effect, written by Lucy Prebble. Ok was triple cast as the character Connie Hall, starring alongside Park Jeong-bok and Kim Ju-yeon. The play is a story about "love and sorrow" centered on four characters: Connie Hall and Tristan Frey, who are participating in a clinical trial for an antidepressant, and the two doctors supervising the test, Dr. Lorna James and Dr. Toby Seeley. The production was directed by Min Sae-rom, with Park Ji-sun as the screenwriter and Bae Yu-ri as the motion director. The show ran from June 10 to August 31 at the Nol Seo-kyung Square Scone Theater 2.

In March 2026, it was announced that Ok will be starring in the upcoming South Korean television adaption of the American spy drama television series The Americans alongside Lee Byung-hun and Han Ji-min under the working title The Koreans (코리언즈), that is slated to be released on Disney+ in 2027. Also in 2026, Ok starred in the SBS romantic comedy workplace television series titled Sold Out on You. It was announced that Ok will make a special appearance in the upcoming psychological thriller television series titled The Perfect Lie starring Yoo Yeon-seok and Seo Hyun-jin, that will premiere on MBC TV in October 2026.

== Filmography ==
=== Film ===
Key
†	Denotes films that have not yet been released

Year	Title	Role	Notes	Ref.
2016	The Age of Shadows	Lee Jung-chool's wife		
2017	Because I Love You	School guard	Cameo	
2018	Burning	Ja-yun	Support role	
2018	Illang: The Wolf Brigade	Illang	Bit part	
2018	The Great Battle	Soldier's wife	Bit part	
2019	Miss & Mrs. Cops	New Pacific suicide female victim	Bit part	
2019	The Beast	Jong-chan's wife	Support role	
2019	The Snob	Tak So-young	Main role	
2019	Ashfall	Min	Supporting role	
2021	The Very Rose	Yoon Jeong	Main role	
2021	Save the Cat	Young-woo	Main role	
2021	Ghost Image		Main role	
2021	On the Line	Intelligence Temple #1	Cameo	
2022	Alienoid	Doctor		
2023	The Archeology of Love	Yeong-sil	Main role	
2024	Mission: Cross	Baek Seon-woo	Supporting role	
2025	The Old Woman with the Knife	Cho-yeob	Supporting role	

=== Television series ===
Key
†	Denotes television productions that have not yet been released

Year	Title	Role	Notes	Ref.
2017	Two Cops	Jin Soo-ah	Supporting role	
2017	Bad Guys: City of Evil	Yang Pil-soon	Supporting role	
2018	Wok of Love	Lee Ji-kyung	Supporting role	
2019	Different Dreams	Oh Kwang-shim	Supporting role	
2020	Find Me in Your Memory	Ms. Kang	Cameo (Episode 30)	
2020	The Uncanny Counter	Baek Hyang-hee	Supporting role	
2021	Mine	Kang Ja-kyung / Lee Hye-jin	Main role	
2021	The Veil	Lin Wei	Supporting role	
2022	Big Mouth	Hyun Ju-hee	Supporting role	
2022	Under the Queen's Umbrella	Royal Consort Gwi-in Hwang	Supporting role	
2023	Queenmaker	Guk Ji-yeon	Supporting role	
2023–2024	Gyeongseong Creature	Na Young-chun	Supporting role	
2024	LTNS	Jeong Min-soo	Supporting role	
2024	Gangnam B-Side	Choi Su-in	Supporting role	
2024	Parole Examiner Lee	Protester	Cameo (Episode 12)	
2025	Nine Puzzles	Seo Yang-hee	Cameo	
2025	Oh My Ghost Clients	Lee Seo-jeong	Guest role (Episodes 3 and 4)	
2026	Sold Out on You	Michelle	Supporting role	
2026	The Ordinary Jackpot		Supporting role	
2026	The Perfect Lie		Supporting role	

=== Television shows ===
Year	Title	Role	Ref.
2022	Jump Like a Witch	Cast member	

== Theater ==
Year	Title	Role	Notes	Ref.
2012	Guest		Acting debut	
2013	Sunday Morning Rice Thief			
2012–2013	Romeo and Juliet	Guard		
2014	Dry and Worn Out			
2014	King Claudius	Gertrude		
2014	The Story of the Beast's Body	Doctor		
2014	Hamlet Avatar	Ophelia		
2015	The Hague 1907	Lee Jun's wife		
2015	Origin of Faith 2: The Winds of Fukushima	Su-jin		
2016	Game	Emma Sara		
2016	Blackbird	Una	Lead role	
2020	Wandering Around	Lee Ja-yeon		
2022	Hiding White Flowers	Maiko		

== Awards and nominations ==
Name of the award ceremony, year presented, category, nominee of the award, and the result of the nomination
Award ceremony	Year	Category	Nominee / Work	Result	Ref.
Baeksang Arts Awards	2022	Best Supporting Actress – Television	Mine	Nominated	
Jeonju International Film Festival	2022	Best Actress	The Archeology of Love	Won	
Singapore International Film Festival	2022	Best Actress	The Archeology of Love	Won	
