= Kim Seon-ho filmography =

Filmography of the South Korean actor

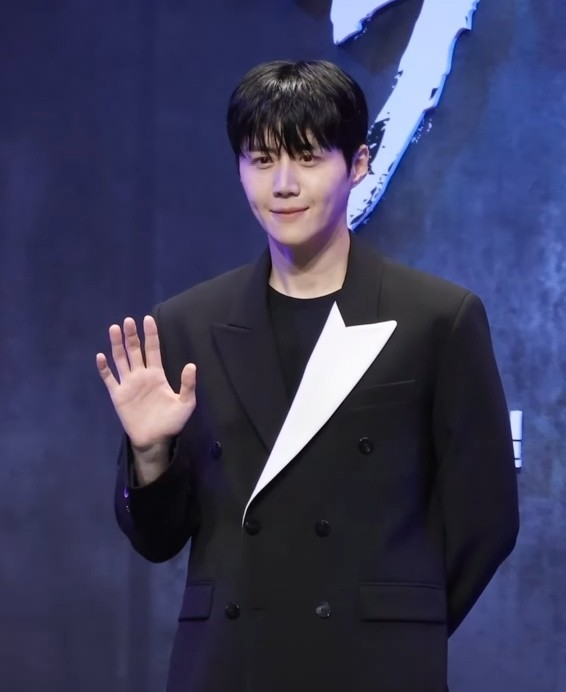
- Kim in 2024
- Film: 1
- Television series: 18
- Television show: 3
- Radio show: 1
- Hosting: 1
- Music videos: 4

Kim Seon-ho (Korean: 김선호) is a South Korean actor with a diverse body of work across various entertainment platforms. He primarily appears in television series and has also participated in three television shows (Note: Unscripted television programs are classified as TV shows in Korea. Scripted shows are classified as TV series.) and one feature film, as well as one radio show.

He began his career in theater, making his debut on stage in 2009. After performing exclusively on stage for eight years, he auditioned for a television role, landing a supporting role in the KBS2 drama Good Manager (2017). Following this, he auditioned for a supporting part in Strongest Deliveryman (2017) but was upgraded to the second male lead. A similar turn of events occurred when he auditioned for a supporting role in MBC drama Two Cops (2017), again earning a second male lead position.

His first leading role came in the four-episode MBC drama special You Drive Me Crazy (2018). That same year, he also played a secondary lead in his first cable drama and pre-produced historical series, tvN's 100 Days My Prince (2018). He continued to gain prominence with his first lead role in a full-length miniseries with JTBC's Welcome to Waikiki 2 (2019), and took on another leading role in the tvN series Catch the Ghost (2019).

He gained international recognition after joining the main cast of the KBS variety show 2 Days & 1 Night (2019–2021) and for his breakout role in the tvN drama series Start-Up (2020), which earned him a Baeksang Arts Award for Most Popular Actor. He solidified his status as a leading actor with the tvN romantic comedy series Hometown Cha-Cha-Cha (2021).

He made his feature film debut in the action noir film The Childe (2023) directed by Park Hoon-jung, where he was top billing. He and Park subsequently collaborated again on their first streaming series, the Disney+ production The Tyrant (2024).

== Filmography ==
=== Film ===
Feature film appearances
Year	Title	Role	Note(s)	Ref.
2023	The Childe	Nobleman	Film debut	

=== Television series ===
Key
†	Denotes television productions that have not yet been released

Television series appearances
Year	Title	Role	Note(s)	Ref.
2017	Good Manager	Sun Sang-tae		
2017	Strongest Deliveryman	Oh Jin-kyu		
2017–2018	Two Cops	Gong Su-chang		
2018	You Drive Me Crazy	Kim Rae-wan	Drama special	
2018	Your House Helper	Yong-joon	Cameo, episode 2	
2018	100 Days My Prince	Jung Jae-yoon		
2018	Feel Good to Die	Kim Min-hyuk	Cameo, episode 4	
2019	Welcome to Waikiki 2	Cha Woo-sik		
2019	Catch the Ghost	Go Ji-seok		
2020	Find Me in Your Memory	Seo Gwang-jin	Cameo, episode 1	
2020	Start-Up	Han Ji-pyeong		
2021	Run On	Kim Sang-ho	Cameo, episode 16	
2021	Hometown Cha-Cha-Cha	Hong Du-sik		
2024	The Tyrant	Director Choe		
2025	When Life Gives You Tangerines	Park Chung-seop	Special appearance, episodes 9–16	
2026	Can This Love Be Translated?	Joo Ho-jin		
2026	Unfriend †	TBA		
2027	Portraits of Delusion †	Yun I-ho		
2027	My Ghostly Running Mate †	Cha Jae-rim		

=== Television shows ===
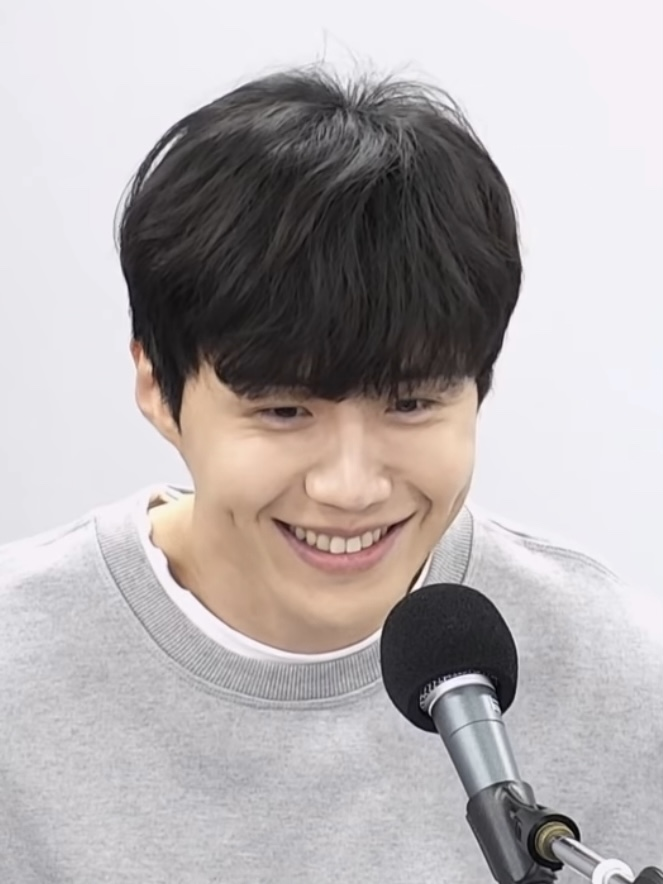
Kim appeared as a guest on SBS Love FM's Kim Sang-hyuk and DinDin's Oppa's Radio on March 13, 2020, where he talked about 2 Days & 1 Night.

Television shows appearances
Year	Title	Role	Note(s)	Ref.
2019–2021	2 Days & 1 Night	Main cast	Season 4 (Episodes 1–95)	
2024	Mukbo Brothers	Cast member	Season 2 (Episodes 1–4)	
2026	Bonjour Bakery	Cast member		

=== Radio show ===
Radio show appearance
Date	Title	Role	Ref.
December 24, 2019	Naver NOW.'s "I Want to Tell You"	Special DJ	

=== Hosting ===
Hosting appearances
Year	Title	Role	Note(s)	Ref.
2020	MBC Gayo Daejejeon	Host	with Im Yoon-ah and Jang Sung-kyu	

=== Music video appearances ===
Music video appearances
Year	Title	Artist(s)	Ref.
2020	"Sleepless" (Vocals by Younha)	Epitone Project	
2021	"Reason" (Vocals by Kim Seon-ho)	Epitone Project	
2024	"Falling Slowly"	Daesung	
2024	"Miracle" (미라클)	Kim Seon-ho	

== See also ==
- Kim Seon-ho discography
- List of Kim Seon-ho live performances
- List of awards and nominations received by Kim Seon-ho
