= List of Kim Seon-ho live performances =

Kim Seon-ho live performances
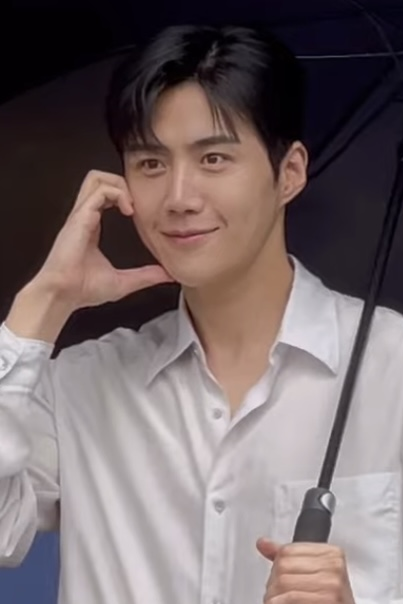
- Kim Seon-ho in 2023
- Award show: 1
- Joint concert: 1
- Talk shows: 2
- Theaters: 22
- Tours: 3

South Korean actor and singer Kim Seon-ho (Korean: 김선호) began his career in the Daehak-ro theater district of Seoul, making his professional debut in the 2009 production of New Boeing Boeing. Kim performed exclusively in theater for eight years, during which time his rising prominence earned him the nickname "theater idol". In a 2016 year-end review, critic Huh Yun-seon highlighted Kim's "explosive energy" on stage and recognized him as an actor with significant potential.

Following his 2017 television debut as accountant Seon Sang-tae in KBS's drama Good Manager, Kim has continued to return to the stage every one to two years. To date, his body of work includes over 20 live theater productions and two talk show appearances in Daehak-ro, Seoul.

On May 8, 2021, Kim released the single "Reason." He co-wrote the lyrics with Epitone Project. This marked their second creative partnership following his appearance in one of their music videos. He subsequently his debut solo tour across Asia, which kicked off in Seoul in December 2022 and continued through 2023 with ten performances across eight cities: Manila, Bangkok, Hong Kong, Tokyo, Taipei, Jakarta, Kuala Lumpur, and Singapore, drawing an estimated total audience of 40,000. In July of the same year, he also joined fellow actors Kim Jae-joong, Hwang Min-hyun, Lee Jae-wook, and Lee Jun-young for a joint concert in Yokohama, Japan.

On April 30, 2024, Kim released the digital single "Miracle" across major music platforms. Written for his fans, the lyrics were a collaboration between Kim and lyricist Kim Ji-hyang. (Note: The song was composed by Seo Jeong-jin, Kim Do-hyun, and Lee Geun-soo) Prior to its official release, he debuted the song live in Bangkok in February during his 2024 Asia tour, with subsequent performances following in Osaka, Tokyo, Manila, Seoul, and Jakarta. In 2026, he commenced his third Asia tour with performances in Seoul, Kanazawa, Jakarta, Manila, Taiwan, and Bangkok.

== Awards show ==
Awards show performance of Kim Seon-ho
Event	Venue	Date(s)	Performed song(s)	Ref.
MBC Gayo Daejejeon	MBC Dream Center in Ilsan, Goyang-si, Gyeonggi-do	December 31, 2021	"Perhaps Love" (Note: Duet with Lim Yoona)	

== Joint concert ==
Joint concert performance of Kim Seon-ho
Year	Title		Role	Venue	Date(s)	Ref.
Year	English	Korean	Role	Venue	Date(s)	Ref.
2023	AAA's Beginning Concert 'Male God'	AAA'의 비기닝 콘서트 '男神(남신)'	Singer	Pia Arena MM, Yokohama, Japan	July 8, 2023	

== Talk shows ==
Talk show performances of Kim Seon-ho
Year	Title		Role	Venue (Note: All venues are in Seoul unless stated otherwise)	Date(s)	Ref.
Year	English	Korean	Role	Venue	Date(s)	Ref.
2012	Mozart and 14 people — the Sound of 13 Seconds to the Northern Land	모차르트와 14인, 13초의 울림 북녘 땅까지'	Figaro (Note: Performing as actor in Opera Segment)	Hongik University cafe 'aA The Design Museum'	November 6, 2012	
2015	Hoy! Style Magazine Show	보이스 오브 밀레니엄	Panelist (Note: Performing as himself)	Jangcheon Hall, Gwanglim Art Center	November 30, 2015	

== Theaters ==
Theater play performances of Kim Seon-ho
Year	Title		Role(s)	Venue	Date(s)	Ref.
Year	English	Korean	Role(s)	Venue	Date(s)	Ref.
2009	New Boeing Boeing	뉴 보잉보잉	Sung-ki	Daehakro Doore Hall 3	—N/a	
2012	Sherlock: The Secret of Birlstone	셜록 : 벌스톤의 비밀	Dr. Watson	Noeul Small Theater	August 1 – September 23, 2012	
2013	New Boeing Boeing	뉴 보잉보잉	Sung-ki	Seongsan Art Hall Small Theater, Changwon	December 18–22, 2013	
2013–2014	Words I Couldn't Say for 7 Years	7년동안 하지 못한 말	In-ho	Daehakro Moonlight Theater	December 17, 2013 – May 30, 2014	
2014	New Boeing Boeing	뉴 보잉보잉	Sung-ki	Somyeong Art Hall, Cheongju	January 22 – February 23, 2014	
2014	Words I Couldn't Say for 7 Years	7년동안 하지 못한 말	In-ho	Figaro Art Hall in Seongnam-dong, Jung District, Ulsan	February 4 – April 4, 2014	
2014	Words I Couldn't Say for 7 Years	7년동안 하지 못한 말	In-ho	Gu Sangsang Art Hall, Daejeon	April 3 – June 1, 2014	
2014	Words I Couldn't Say for 7 Years	7년동안 하지 못한 말	In-ho	SM Art Hall 3, Busan	April 15 – May 4, 2014	
2014	Rooftop House Cat	옥탑방 고양이	Lee Kyung-min	Daehakro Tintin hall	August 4, 2014 – February 8, 2015 (Note: Season 10)	
2015	Rooftop House Cat	옥탑방 고양이	Lee Kyung-min	Daehakro Tintin hall	February 9 – August 8, 2015 (Note: Season 11)	
2015	Rooftop House Cat	옥탑방 고양이	Lee Kyung-min	Daehakro Tintin hall	August 9, 2015 – February 8, 2016 (Note: Season 12)	
2015	Purpose of Love	연애의 목적	Choi Ji-sung	A Art Hall	February 12 – June 21, 2015	
2015	True West	트루웨스트	Austin	A Art Hall	August 13 – November 1, 2015	
2015	Rooftop House Cat	옥탑방 고양이	Lee Kyung-min	CK Art Hall, Ulsan	November 3–29, 2015	
2015–2016	Kiss of the Spider Woman	거미여인의 키스	Valentin	Sinyeon Art Hall (A Art Hall)	November 7, 2015 – January 31, 2016	
2015–2016	Rooftop House Cat	옥탑방 고양이	Lee Kyung-min	Shindorim Prime Art Hall	December 3, 2015 – February 28, 2016	
2016	Almost, Maine	올모스트 메인	East, Lendall, Chad, Dave	Sangmyung Art Hall 1	January 8 – July 3, 2016	
2016	True West Returns	트루웨스트 리턴즈	Austin	Yegreen Theater	June 24 – August 28, 2016	
2016	Closer	클로저	Dan	Yegreen Theater	September 6 – November 13, 2016	
2016	Voice of Millennium	보이스 오브 밀레니엄	Hyung-seok	Dongsung Art Center Small Theater	November 5 – December 31, 2016	
2017–2018	Kiss of the Spider Woman	거미여인의 키스	Valentin	Art One Theater 2	December 5, 2017 – February 25, 2018	
2019–2020	Memory in Dream	메모리 인 드림	Eden	Haeoreum Arts Theater	November 8, 2019 – January 19, 2020	
2021	Ice	얼음	Detective 2 Lee Jong-ryeol	Sejong Center S Theater	January 8 – March 21, 2021	
2021	Ice	얼음	Detective 2 Lee Jong-ryeol	Seongnam Arts Center, Seongnam	May 14–16, 2021	
2022	Touching the Void	터칭 더 보이드	Joe	Art One Theatre 2	July 8 – September 18, 2022	
2023–2024	Realise Happiness	행복을 찾아서	Kim Woo-jin	Daehak-ro TOM 2	December 5, 2023 – February 18, 2024	
2026	Secret Passage: Interval	비밀통로 : Interval	Dong-jae	NOL Theater, Middle Theater	February 13 – May 3, 2026	

== Tours ==
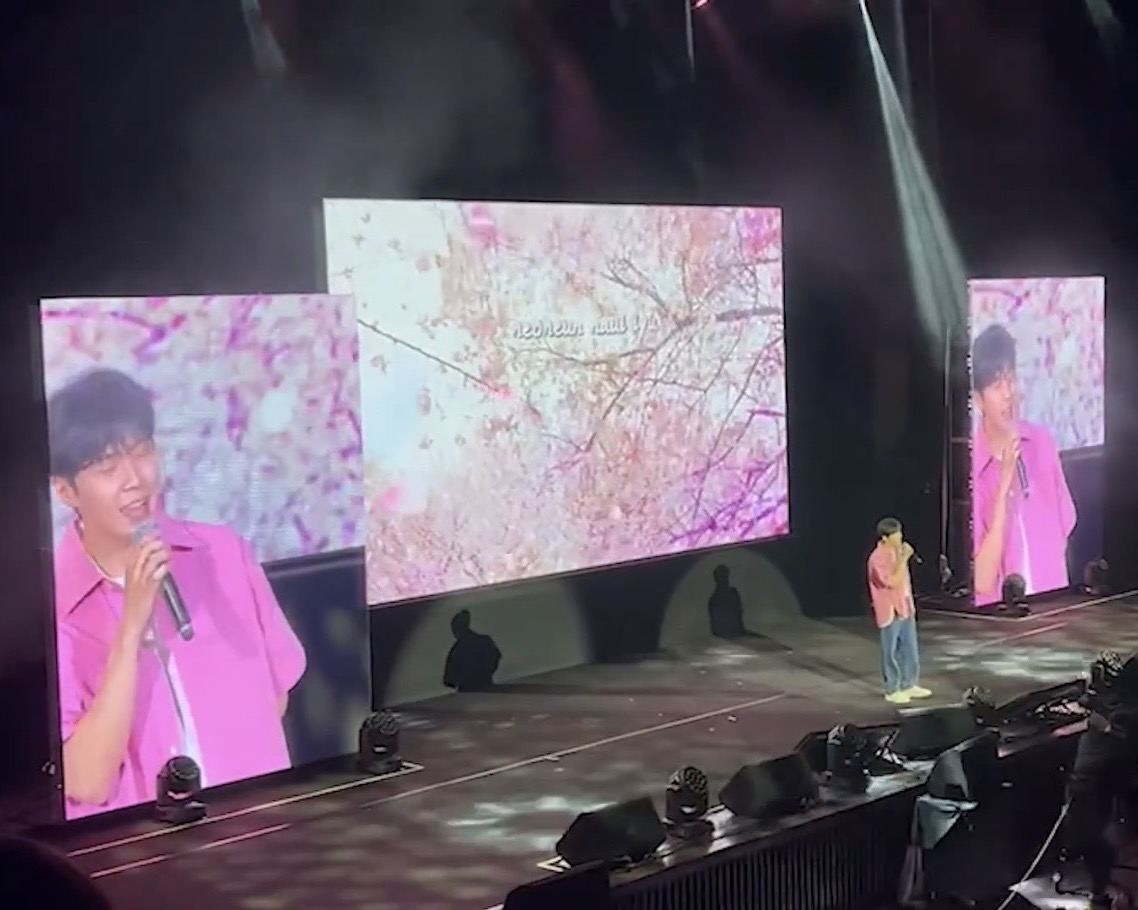
Kim Seon-ho singing "Reason" during his "One, Two, Three, Smile" Asia Tour concert in Taipei (2023)

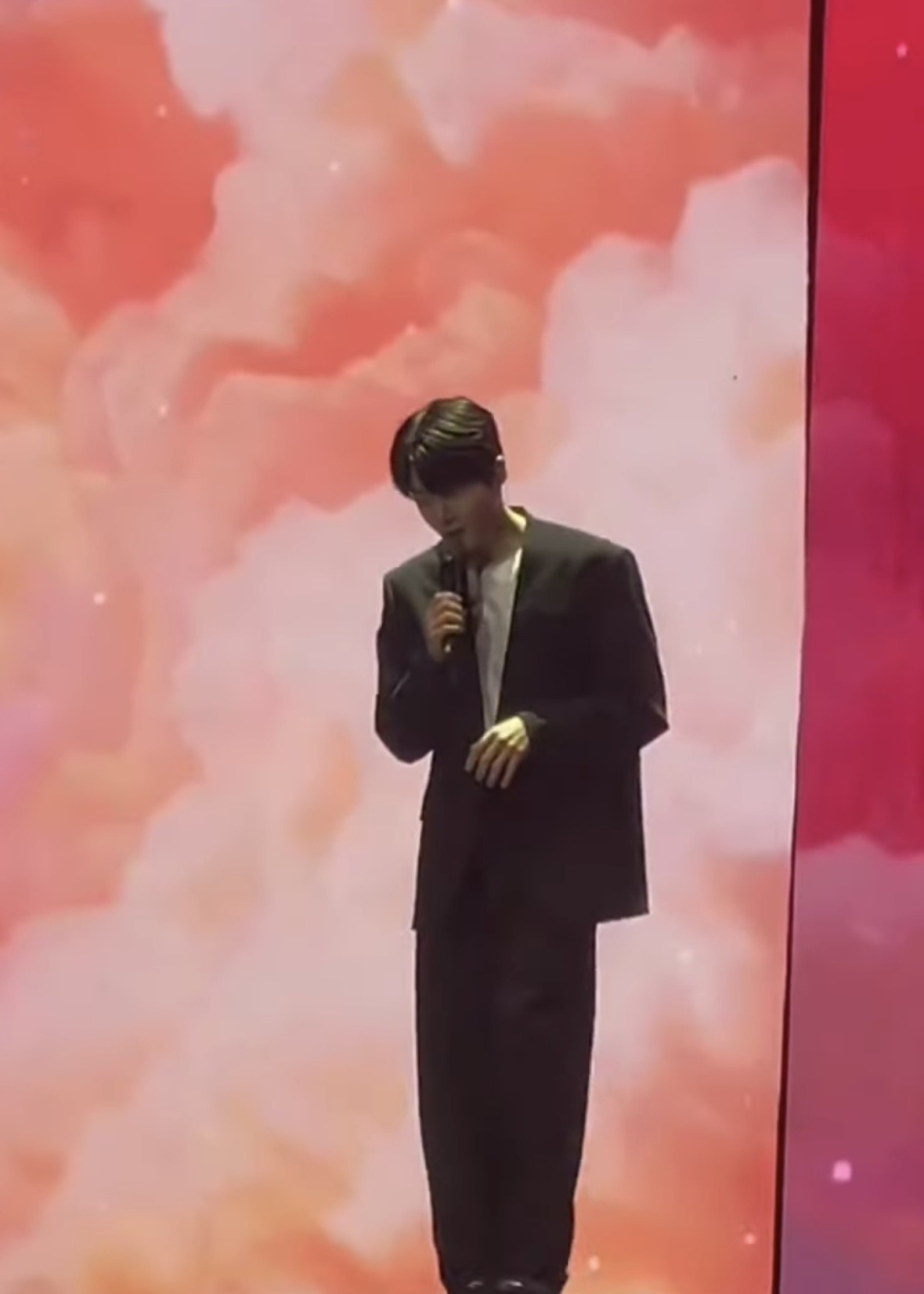
Kim Seon-ho singing "Miracle" during his "Color+Full" Asia Tour concert in Jakarta (2024)

Tour performances of Kim Seon-ho
Year	Title	Venue	Date(s)	Ref.
2022–2023	Kim Seon-ho Asia Tour: One, Two, Three, Smile	Sejong University (Daeyang Hall), Seoul	December 10–11, 2022	
2022–2023	Kim Seon-ho Asia Tour: One, Two, Three, Smile	SM Mall of Asia Arena, Manila	January 22, 2023	
2022–2023	Kim Seon-ho Asia Tour: One, Two, Three, Smile	Queen Sirikit National Convention Center, Bangkok	February 11–12, 2023	
2022–2023	Kim Seon-ho Asia Tour: One, Two, Three, Smile	Taipei International Convention Center, Taipei	April 16, 2023	
2022–2023	Kim Seon-ho Asia Tour: One, Two, Three, Smile	Star Hall Kitec, Hongkong	April 29, 2023	
2022–2023	Kim Seon-ho Asia Tour: One, Two, Three, Smile	Line Cube Shibuya, Tokyo	May 12, 2023	
2022–2023	Kim Seon-ho Asia Tour: One, Two, Three, Smile	Tennis Indoor Senayan, Jakarta	June 2–3, 2023	
2022–2023	Kim Seon-ho Asia Tour: One, Two, Three, Smile	Megastar Arena, Kuala Lumpur	August 18, 2023	
2022–2023	Kim Seon-ho Asia Tour: One, Two, Three, Smile	The Star Theater, Singapore	September 15, 2023	
2024	Kim Seon-ho Asia Tour: Color+Full	Queen Sirikit National Convention Center, Bangkok	February 3, 2024	
2024	Kim Seon-ho Asia Tour: Color+Full	Tachikawa Stage Garden, Tokyo	April 5, 2024	
2024	Kim Seon-ho Asia Tour: Color+Full	Higashiosaka Cultural Creation Hall (Grand Hall), Osaka	April 7, 2024	
2024	Kim Seon-ho Asia Tour: Color+Full	SM Mall of Asia Arena, Manila	April 13, 2024	
2024	Kim Seon-ho Asia Tour: Color+Full	KBS Arena, Seoul	April 27–28, 2024	
2024	Kim Seon-ho Asia Tour: Color+Full	Indonesia Arena, Jakarta	July 27, 2024	
2026	Kim Seon-ho Asia Tour: Love Factory	Bluesquare Woori Won (Banking Hall), Seoul	April 11–12, 2026	
2026	Kim Seon-ho Asia Tour: Love Factory	ICE BSD (Hall 10), Jakarta	April 25, 2026	
2026	Kim Seon-ho Asia Tour: Love Factory	Cultiz Kawasaki, Kanagawa	May 10, 2026	
2026	Kim Seon-ho Asia Tour: Love Factory	Smart Araneta Coliseum, Manila	May 31, 2026	
2026	Kim Seon-ho Asia Tour: Love Factory	New Taipei City Exhibition Hall, Taipei	June 6, 2026	
2026	Kim Seon-ho Asia Tour: Love Factory	Thunder Dome, Bangkok	June 20, 2026	

== See also ==
- Kim Seon-ho discography
- Kim Seon-ho filmography
- List of awards and nominations received by Kim Seon-ho
