= Kim Seon-ho =

South Korean actor (born 1986)

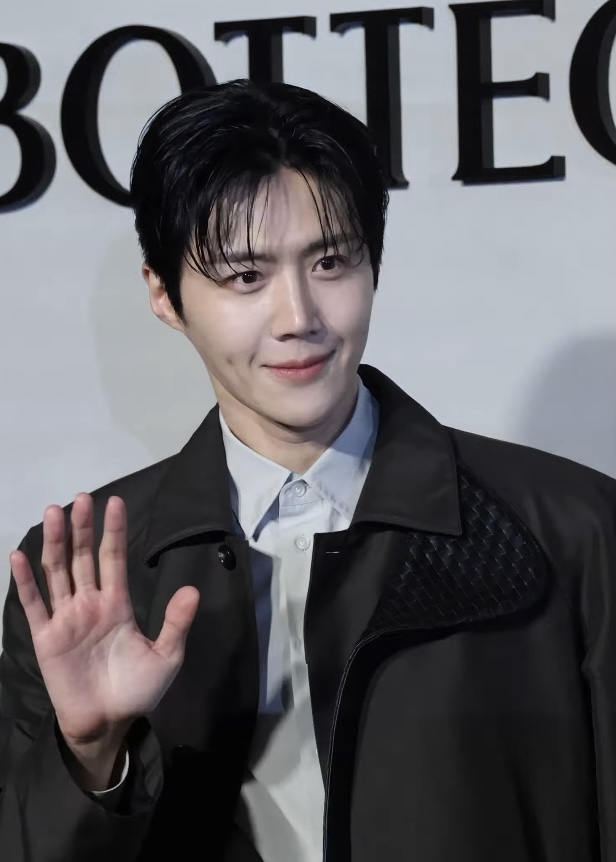
- Kim in January 2026
- Born: May 8, 1986 (age 40); Seoul, South Korea
- Education: Seoul Institute of the Arts
- Occupation: Actor
- Years active: 2009–present
- Agent: Fantagio
- Works: Discography; filmography; live performances
- Awards: Full list

Korean name
- Hangul: 김선호
- Hanja: 金宣虎
- RR: Gim Seonho
- MR: Kim Sŏnho
- Kim Seon-ho's voice Kim Seon-ho introduces himself (2026)
- Website: Official website

Signature
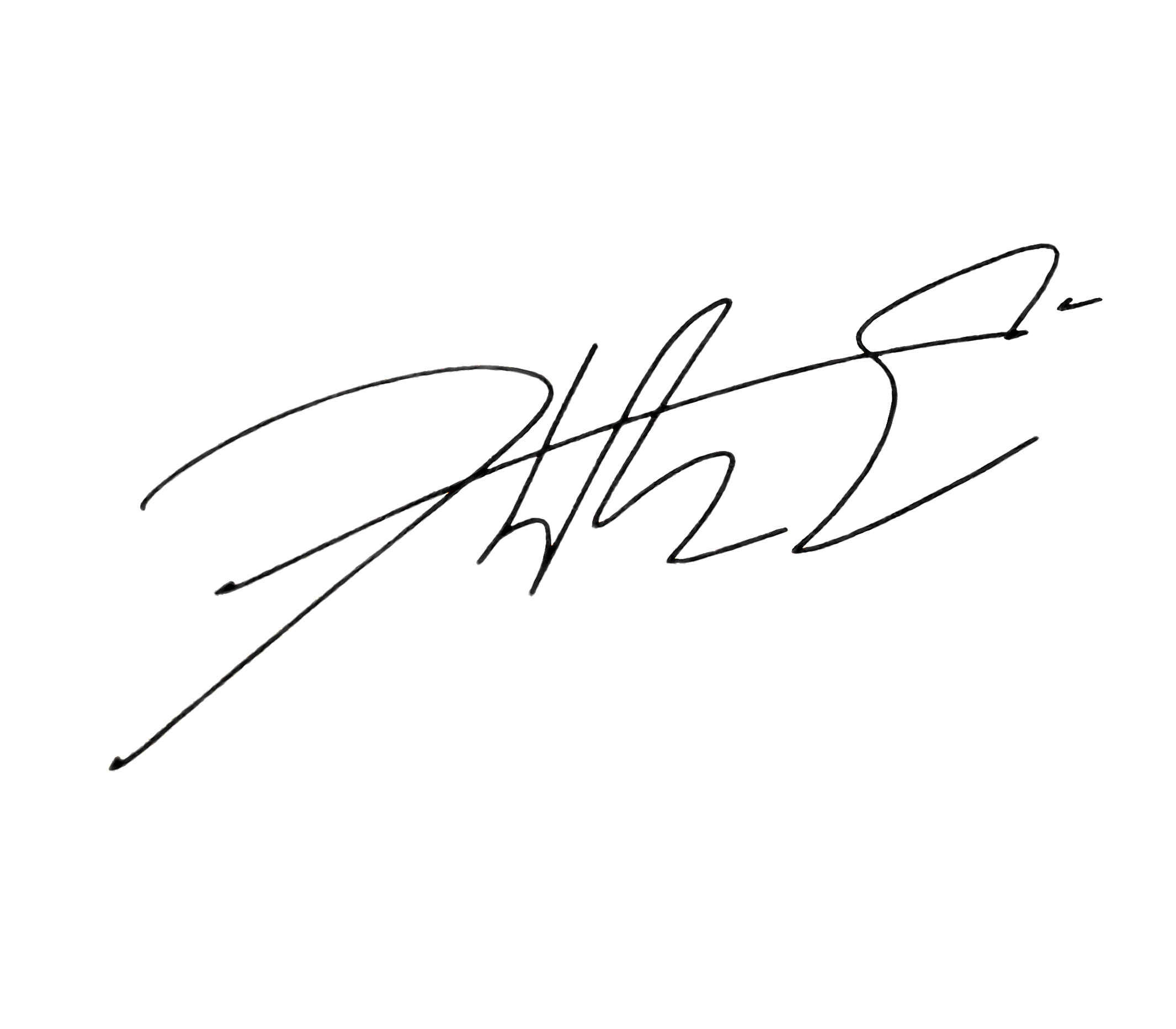

Kim Seon-ho (Korean: 김선호; pronounced [kim.sʰʌnho̞]; born May 8, 1986) is a South Korean actor. He had his breakthrough role as Han Ji-pyeong in Start-Up (2020) and gained further attention for his performance as Hong Du-sik in the romantic comedy Hometown Cha-Cha-Cha (2021). For the latter, Gallup Korea named him Television Actor of the Year. He also stars as Joo Ho-jin in the Netflix series Can This Love Be Translated? (2026), for which he received a Best Actor nomination at the 5th Blue Dragon Series Awards.

In 2005, Kim began studying acting at the Seoul Institute of the Arts. While still in college, he launched his acting career as a theater actor in Daehangno in 2009. After graduating with his bachelor's degree in 2011, he continued to gain recognition through his stage performances and earned the moniker "theater idol." He made his television debut in KBS drama Good Manager (2017). After auditioning for supporting roles in Strongest Deliveryman (2017) and Two Cops (2017), he was upgraded to the second male lead in both dramas, winning two MBC Drama Awards for the latter. His first leading role came in the four-episode MBC drama special You Drive Me Crazy (2018), followed by secondary lead roles in tvN's 100 Days My Prince (2018), before he transitioned to full miniseries leads in JTBC's Welcome to Waikiki 2 (2019) and tvN series Catch the Ghost (2019).

In 2023, he received top billing for his feature film debut in Park Hoon-jung's action noir The Childe (2023), for which he won several Best New Actor awards. The pair subsequently collaborated again on their first streaming series, Disney+ The Tyrant (2024). Alongside his screen career, he continues to perform in stage productions.

Beyond acting, he ventured into variety programming as a main cast member on the KBS show 2 Days & 1 Night (2019–2021), winning the Rookie Award at the KBS Entertainment Awards. Later, he joined the cast of Bonjour Bakery (2026) and received a Best New Entertainer nomination at the 5th Blue Dragon Series Awards. He has also worked as a brand model in South Korea and across Asia, and engaged in various philanthropic activities.

== Early life and education ==
Kim Seon-ho was born on May 8, 1986, in Seongbuk District, Seoul, South Korea. His given name, "Seon-ho" (Korean: 선호; Hanja: 宣虎), translates to "benevolent tiger." He grew up as an only child in Bongcheon-dong, a low-income hillside neighborhood known as a daldongnae. (Note: Daldongne (달동네; 'Moon Village'), derived from dal (달; 'moon') and dongne (동네; 'neighborhood'), is a term describing hillside neighborhoods historically populated by the urban poor, originally North Korean refugees and rural migrants seeking employment.) In the second grade, a home invasion forced him to hide under a bed while witnessing his mother being stabbed. The experience left him timid and introverted, resulting in severe public anxiety, an inability to read aloud in class, and intense discomfort whenever anyone stood behind him. A chance visit to an acting academy with a friend during his third year of high school sparked his interest in the craft. He enrolled and soon found in acting an outlet that helped him work through the trauma.

Encouraged by his acting academy teacher, an alumnus of the Seoul Institute of the Arts, Kim chose the same institution to pursue his goal of becoming a professional actor. His parents fully supported his career choice and agreed to help finance his education. Although enrolled in the Department of Broadcasting and Entertainment as part of the Class of 2005, Kim focused heavily on theater coursework, through which he met Lee Dong-hwi and Kwon Hyuk-soo, who were students in the Department of Theater. Together, they joined the campus theater club, the Dramatic Arts Research Society, (Note: Seouryedae geugyesul yeonguhoe (서울예대극예술연구회; 'The Seoul Institute of the Arts Dramatic Arts Research Society') is the oldest and official theater club of the Seoul Institute of the Arts, established in 1980. It continues the legacy of the original Dramatic Art Research Society, a group founded in 1931 by early theater figures including Dongrang Yu Chi-jin. Kim Seon-ho was active in the club with peers including Lee Dong-hwi (Class of 2005, Theater Department). Other notable alumni include Park Hee-soon, Jung Hae-kyun, and Im Won-hee.) which performed established works such as My Town, The Seagull, and Chunpung's Wife, alongside original pieces written and produced by members. While playing a cafe worker in an early student production, Kim experienced severe stage fright, but regained his composure upon seeing his high school friends in the audience and gradually grew comfortable on stage through subsequent roles.

In 2007, Kim began his mandatory military service. Initially serving as a drill instructor at the Nonsan Army Training Center before transitioning to a role as a public service worker. He credited his time as a drill instructor with improving his pronunciation and enunciation, while noting that managing and counseling diverse individuals as a public service worker enhanced his communication skills and fostered a more outgoing personality. He has characterized this period as transformative, stating that it broadened his worldview and provided new perspectives for his acting career.

== Career ==
=== 2009–2016: Beginnings in theater ===
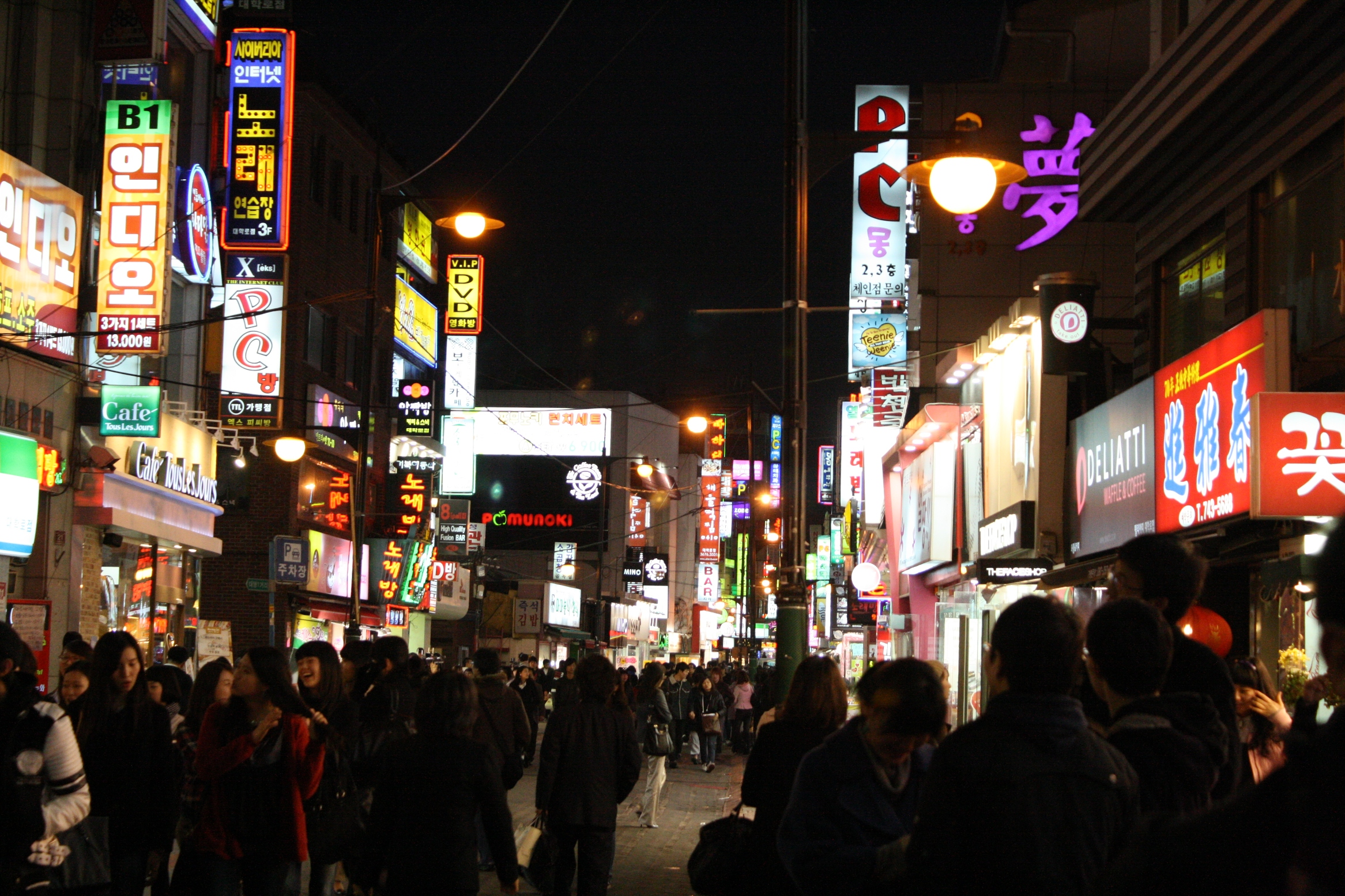
The Daehakro theater district, where Kim started his career as stage actor

Kim made his professional stage debut in 2009 in the Daehakro theater district's open-run production of New Boeing Boeing, an adaptation of French playwright Marc Camoletti's farce Boeing-Boeing. He reprised this role in 2013 and 2014. After graduating with his bachelor's degree in 2011, he continued his career in Daehakro, auditioning for roles while leveraging the experience he gained at the Seoul Institute of the Arts. In 2012, he portrayed Dr. Watson in Han Jae-hyeok's Sherlock: The Secret of Birlstone, a Korean adaptation of Sir Arthur Conan Doyle's novel The Valley of Fear.

In December 2013, Kim took the leading role in Park Jung-in's Words I Couldn't Say for 7 Years at the Daehakro Moonlight Theater, Seoul, later reprising this role in 2014 at venues in Ulsan, Daejeon, and Busan. In autumn 2014, he was triple-cast as Lee Kyung-min in season 10 of Alligator Theater Company's Rooftop House Cat{{efn-ua|. (Note: The open-run romantic comedy Rooftop House Cat concluded its record-setting 15-year run from December 2010 to February 2026, having been seen by over 3 million people.) after winning an audition against 200 candidates. Kim was recast for seasons 11 and 12. In 2015, he secured another lead role in the company's romantic comedy Purpose of Love.

Later that year, Kim continued his work with the Alligator Theater Company while transitioning to a darker repertoire, auditioning for Oh Man-seok's revival of Sam Shepard's True West. Kim shared the role of Austin alongside Lee Hyun-wook and Moon Sung-il, alternating performances opposite Jeon Seok-ho, Kim Jun-won, and Lee Dae-il, who shared the role of Austin's brother, Lee. The production ranked first in Interpark sales as soon as bookings opened. He closed the year as Valentin in the Korean revival of Manuel Puig's Kiss of the Spider Woman, performing from November through January 2016.

In 2016, Kim auditioned for Theater Ganda's production of John Cariani's Almost, Maine. Despite a 200-to-1 competition rate, he secured a place in the production and portrayed four different roles as part of the second cast, beginning his run in April. He followed this with two consecutive productions with Alligator Theater Company: first reprising the role of Austin in the Korean encore of Sam Shepard's play True West Return and subsequently performing in the revival of Patrick Marber's Closer. Directed by Roh Deok, the latter featured him alongside an ensemble including Bae Seong-woo, Seo Hyun-woo, Kim So-jin, and Park So-dam. In November, he joined the production of Park Dong-wook's Voice of Millennium. The play was produced by Space to Create (Note: Space to Create is a theater company established by Ahn Hyuk-won and Jeon Seok-ho.) and directed by Park Seon-hee. His growing prominence in Daehakro during this period earned him the nickname "theater idol." In a year-end review, critic Huh Yun-seon noted his significant potential and his "explosive energy" on stage.

=== 2017–2019: Television debut ===
In 2016, producer Lee Eun-jin, having previously seen his performance in the play Closer, invited him to an audition for the KBS2 office drama Good Manager. He landed a supporting role as Seon Sang-tae, an accounting department employee, marking his screen debut when the drama aired in early 2017. Later that year, despite initially auditioning for a minor deliveryman role, Kim was cast by director Jeon Woo-sung as second lead Oh Jin-kyu in KBS2 drama Strongest Deliveryman, starring alongside Go Kyung-pyo, Chae Soo-bin, and Go Won-hee. His performances in both series earned him a nomination for Best New Actor at the 2017 KBS Drama Awards.

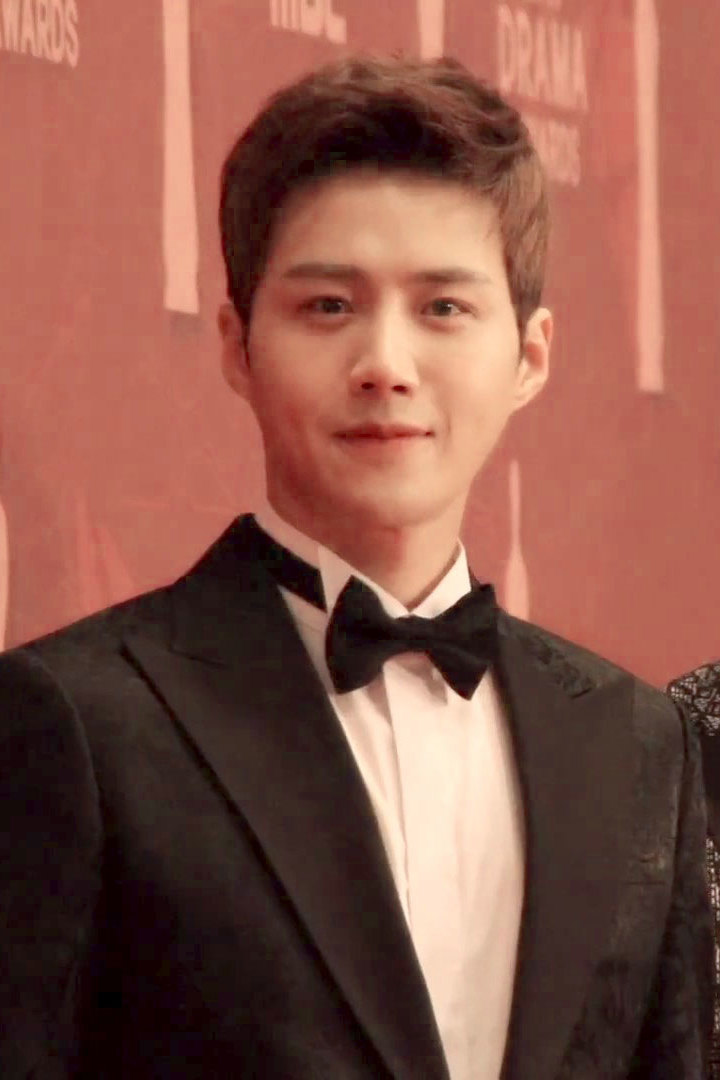
Kim Seon-ho in the red carpet interview of 2017 MBC Drama Awards

Kim's subsequent project was the MBC action comedy Two Cops, starring opposite Jo Jung-suk and Lee Hye-ri. Director Oh Hyun-jong cast him as the second lead, conman Gong Su-chang, despite Kim originally auditioning for a supporting role. For his performance, Kim won both the New Actor Award and the Excellence Actor Award at the 2017 MBC Drama Awards. While the series was still airing, he reprised his stage role as Valentin in Korean encore production of Kiss of the Spider Woman.

In May 2018, Kim starred opposite Lee Yoo-young in the four-episode MBC drama You Drive Me Crazy. It marked his first leading role, in which he portrayed painter Kim Rae-wan. The production was noted for the lead actors' chemistry and topped portal site search rankings during its broadcast. That July, he made a cameo appearance in Your House Helper as the ex-boyfriend of Go Won-hee's character, reuniting with Go and director Jeon Woo-sung, with whom he had previously worked on Strongest Deliveryman. Following his departure from the Alligator Theater Company, Kim signed an exclusive contract with S.A.L.T. Entertainment in September.

Concurrently, Kim had been filming his first pre-produced historical drama, 100 Days My Prince, since April. In the series, he portrayed Jung Jae-yoon, a genius yangban (aristocrat) with face blindness, whose career rank is limited by his status as the illegitimate son of a concubine. 100 Days My Prince aired on tvN from September 10 to October 30, 2018, and peaked at 14.4% viewership, becoming one of the Korea's highest-rated cable dramas. It led Good Data's TV Drama Buzzworthiness rankings for three weeks, with Kim ranking sixth among performers in mid-October. He concluded the year in November with a special appearance in the KBS2 drama Feel Good to Die, a role taken to support director Lee Eun-jin.

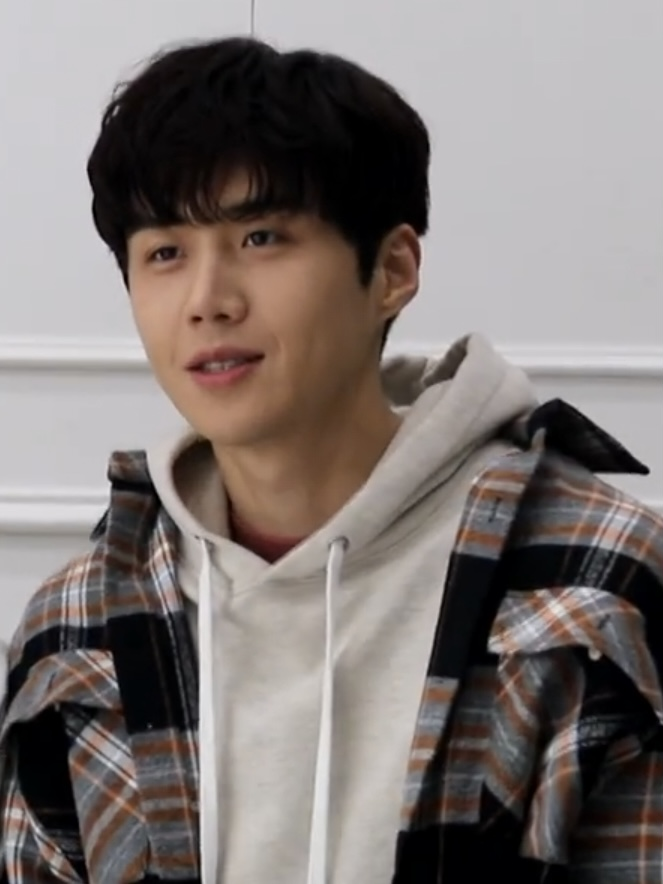
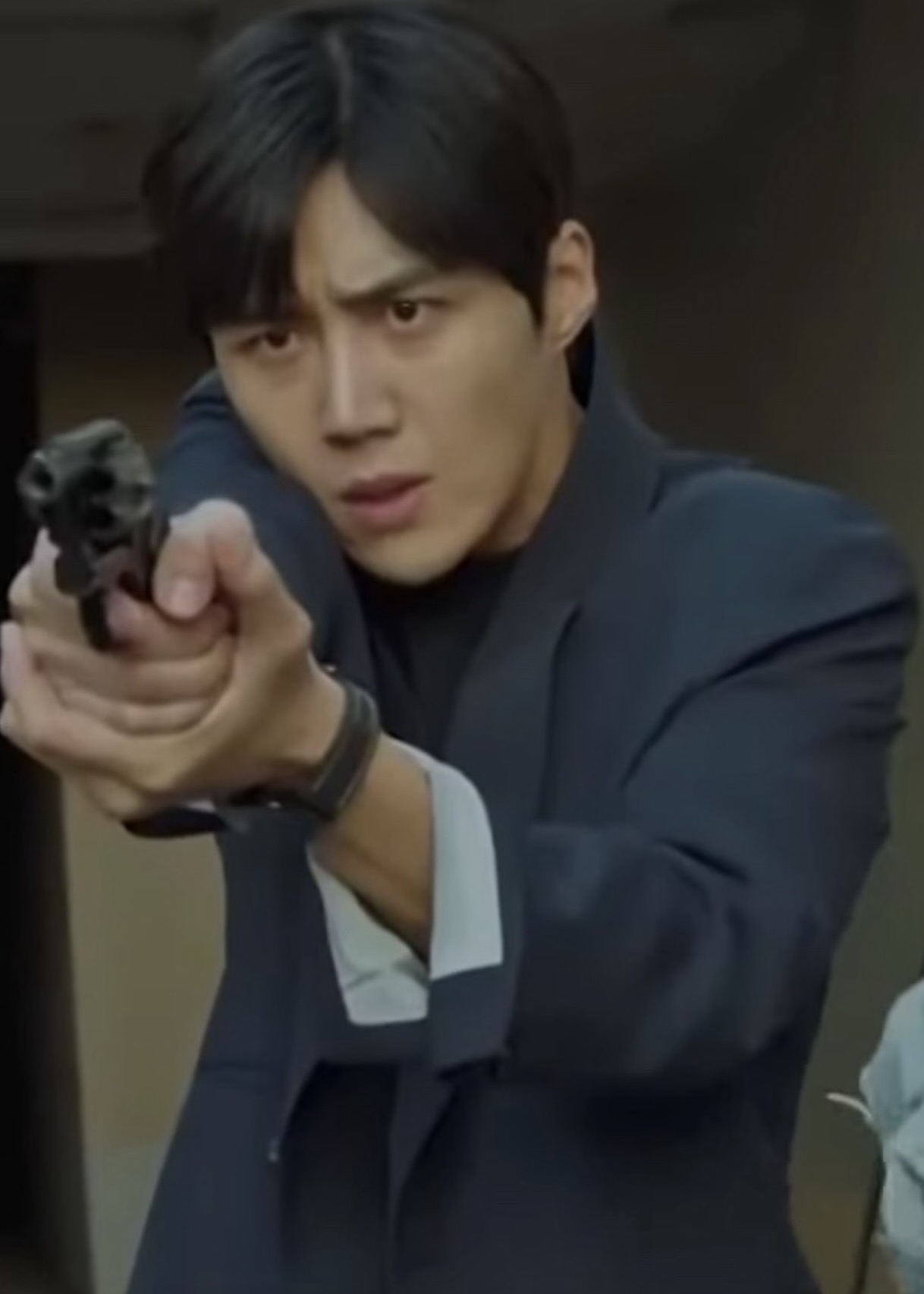
In 2019, Kim Seon-ho playing protagonist Cha Woo-shik in Welcome to Waikiki 2 (left) and Go Ji-seok in Catch the Ghost (right)

In March 2019, Kim starred in the JTBC comedy series Welcome to Waikiki 2 as aspiring singer Cha Woo-shik. He joined a new ensemble cast including Shin Hyun-soo, Ahn So-hee, Moon Ga-young, and Kim Ye-won, alongside returning season one actor Lee Yi-kyung. Later that October, Kim starred opposite Moon Geun-young in the tvN investigative crime drama Catch the Ghost. He portrayed Go Ji-seok, a subway police detective who sacrificed a career in the violent crimes unit to care for his mother following her dementia diagnosis. This project marked his second main protagonist role in a miniseries following Welcome to Waikiki 2. On November 5, 2019, Kim joined the permanent cast of the fourth season of the KBS2 reality show 2 Days & 1 Night. His work on the program earned him the Rookie Award at the 2020 KBS Entertainment Awards. For his final project of the year, Kim returned to the stage in the play Memory in dream [sic]. During his run from November 2019 to February 2020, he performed in 33 sold-out shows, attracting an audience of approximately 4,700.

=== 2020–2022: Breakthrough roles ===
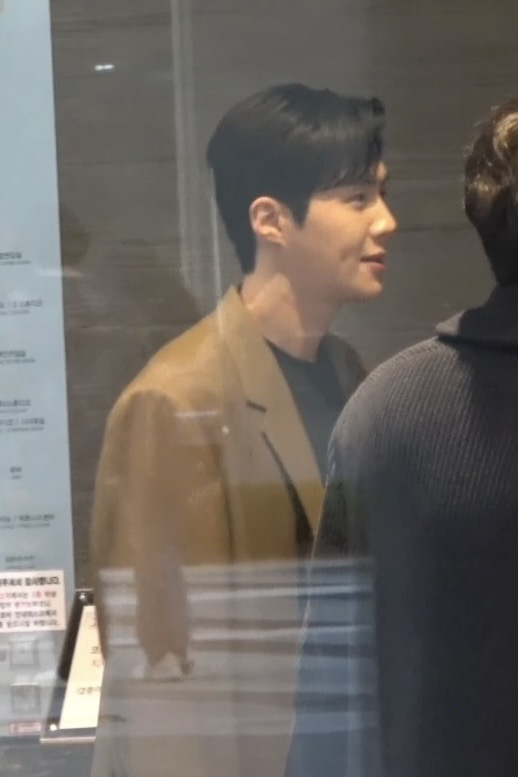
Kim Seon-ho in costume as venture capitalist Han Ji-pyeong (2020)

In March 2020, Kim made a special appearance in the MBC drama Find Me in Your Memory, marking a reunion with Two Cops director Oh Hyun-jong and his Welcome to Waikiki 2 co-star Moon Ga-young. Later that year, he starred as Han Ji-pyeong in Start-Up alongside Bae Suzy, Nam Joo-hyuk, Kang Han-na and Kim Hae-sook. Written by Park Hye-ryun and directed by Oh Chung-hwan, the series aired concurrently on tvN and Netflix from October 17 to December 6, 2020.

Kim's portrayal as Han Ji-pyeong, a self-made venture capitalist who succeeded after aging out of the foster-care system, (Note: Jaripjunbicheongnyeon (자립준비청년; 'Youth preparing for self-reliance') is term depicting orphan who was aged out from foster care system. This term was formally adopted in 2022, replacing the former term of Bohojongnyoadong (보호종료아동; 'child whose protection has ended').) was widely regarded as a breakout performance that significantly raised his profile both domestically and internationally. During the series' run, he remained in Good Data's Top 10 Actor Buzzworthiness chart for six consecutive weeks, peaking at third, and earned the top spot on the Korean Business Research Institute's Actor Brand Reputation ranking in November. He subsequently featured on the Forbes Korea Power Celebrity 40 list. At the 57th Baeksang Arts Awards, he received a nomination for Best Supporting Actor – Television and won the Most Popular Actor Award.

The character's cultural footprint extended beyond television ratings. The 2021 Seoul International Drama Awards named Han Ji-pyeong one of the Characters of the Year, and the Beautiful Foundation (Note: Areumdaeun jaedan (아름다은재단; 'The Beautiful Foundation') is a non-profit organization established in August 2000, to spread a mature philanthropic culture and support neighbors in community and public-benefit activities.) praised the character for challenging media stereotypes surrounding youth aging out of foster-care; noting that, "Kim Seon-ho has brought the character to life with his excellent acting." This prompted the organization to send handwritten letters and gifts to Studio Dragon and Kim in January 2021, and later awarded Han Ji-pyeong second place in the Eighteen Adults Awards category at their 2022 Media Character Awards Ceremony. (Note: The Media Character Awards was held on December 2022. It was organized by The Beautiful Foundation, with winners chosen through a survey and public vote involving 645 participants. The initiative featured the Eightheen Adults Award category created to recognize nuanced portrayals of youth preparing for self-reliance. Oh Mi-joo (played by Shin Se-kyung) from the drama Run On placed first, followed by Han Ji-pyeong in second place.)

In early 2021, Kim made a special appearance in the JTBC drama Run On, reuniting with director Lee Jae-hoon, who also directed Good Manager. He then returned to the theater with Jang Jin's two-hander Ice from January 8 to March 21, 2021, at S Theater, Sejong Center for the Performing Arts, playing Detective Lee Jong-ryeol. All his shows sold out on the first day tickets went on sale. He and actor Jung Woong-in reprised their roles for a special encore performance on May 16 at the Seongnam Arts Center. Earlier, on May 8, Kim released the single "Reason" for his fans. He co-wrote the lyrics with Epitone Project, marking their second collaboration after he previously starred in one of his music videos.

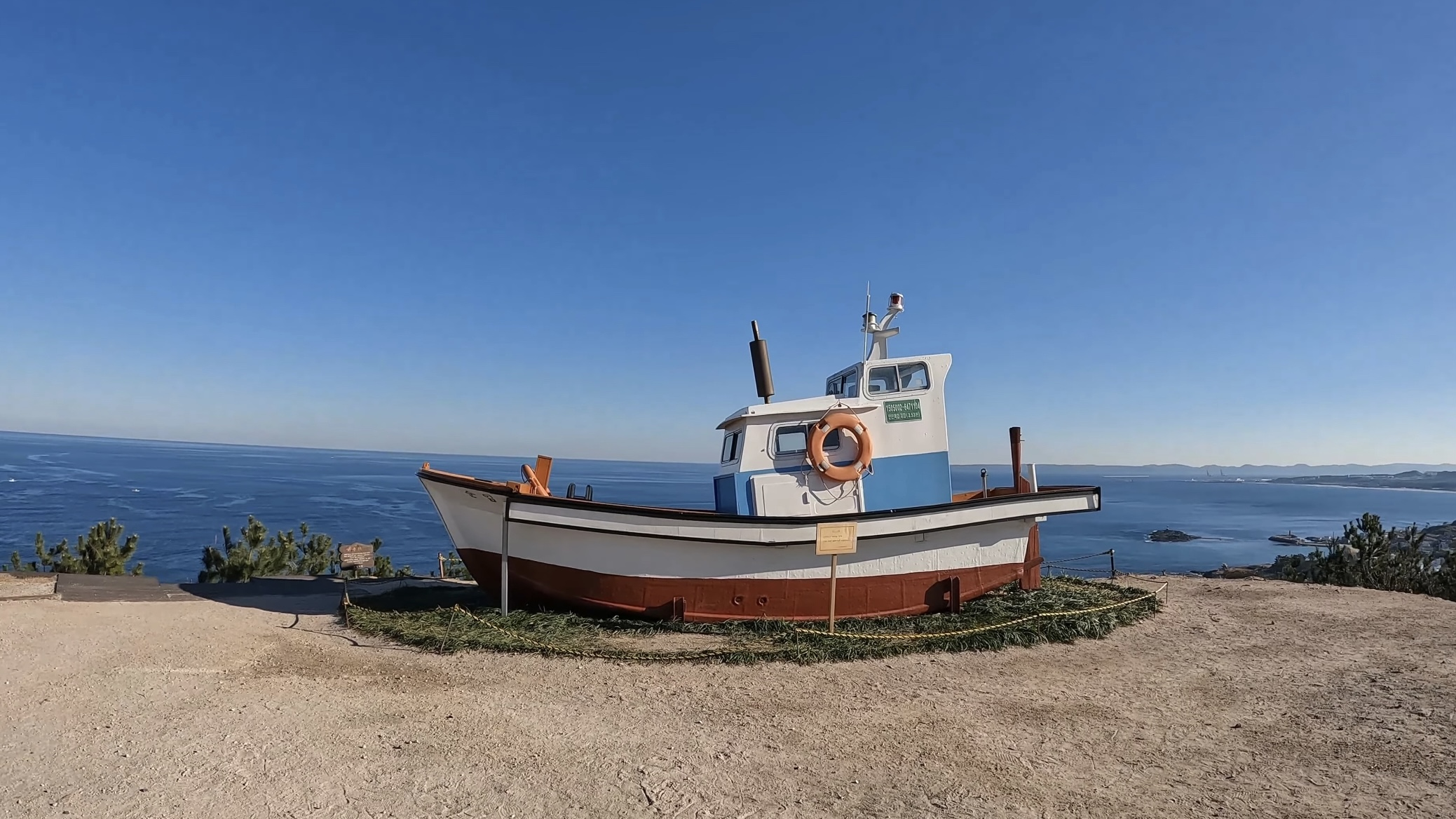
Frequently dubbed as "Kim Seon-ho's boat," the prop from Hometown Cha-Cha-Cha was permanently installed on Mugeunbong Peak in Pohang's Sabang Memorial Park, transforming the site into an international tourist destination.

In August 2021, Kim headlined the tvN romantic comedy series Hometown Cha-Cha-Cha, opposite Shin Min-a, playing a multi-skilled handyman and village chief Hong Du-sik. It was a remake of 2004 film Mr. Handy, Mr. Hong. For the part, Kim learned to surf, trained as a barista, and practiced guitar so he could perform "Old Love" by Lee Moon-sae in the series. Critic Matt O'Neill noted that the on-screen chemistry between Shin Min-a and Kim "is akin to that of Julia Roberts and Richard Gere in Pretty Woman." The series achieved peak ratings of 13.3%, among the highest recorded for cable drama. It spent 16 weeks on Netflix's Global non-English Top 10 list, reached the Top 10 in over 20 countries. Kim secured first place in Good Data's "Drama Performer Buzzworthiness" list for five straight weeks, and was named Gallup Korea Television Actor of the Year. He went on to win the Outstanding Actor Award at the 2022 Seoul International Drama Awards.

Filming for his debut feature film, The Childe, started in December 2021, with overseas scenes filmed in Thailand in March 2022. In May, Kim returned to the stage for the third installment of "The 9th Best Plays Festival" (Note: The Best Play Festival or Yeongeuk yeoljeon (연극열전; 'Theater Chronicle') is a biennial theater festival hosted by The Best Plays Inc. Established in 2007 following the success of the 2004 event initiated by the Dongsoong Art Center Theatre Company, the festival marked a significant shift in Korean theater by featuring young directors and popular stars. Its core goals are to produce outstanding Korean plays, support new playwrights, and introduce exceptional international works to enrich the domestic theater industry.) in the Korean premiere of David Greig's play Touching the Void. Directed by Kim Dong-yeon, Kim was triple-cast in the role of Joe Simpson with Shin Sung-min and Lee Hwi-jong. According to Interpark, all of Kim's performances in the 250-seat Art One Theater sold out during their run from July to September 2022. He donated his entire theater appearance fee to relief efforts for Typhoon Hinnamnor. For his performance, Kim received the OBS Hot Icon Award in December 2022, along with Best Theater Actor nomination at Interpark Golden Ticket Awards in April 2023.

=== 2023–2024: Film debut, theater work, and return to television ===
2023 saw him work on two primary projects, beginning with Park Hoon-jung's The Tyrant, which filmed from January 2 through April. From June to November, Kim filmed the streaming series Unfriend. During this period, Kim also promoted his feature film debut, The Childe, which opened in South Korea, Taiwan, and Indonesia on June 21, 2023, before its subsequent worldwide release. Kim portrayed Gwigongja, an eccentric killer-for-hire. As requested by director Park Hoon-jung, Kim modeled his character after Stanley Kubrick's A Clockwork Orange. His preparation involved two months of English practice and intensive action training including firearms handling. Despite his acrophobia, Kim performed most of his own stunts, including a jump from an overpass. Critic James Marsh of South China Morning Post noted that the nobleman exhibited "self-effacing irreverence". For his performance, Kim won the Best New Actor award at both the Buil Film Awards and the 59th Grand Bell Awards. At the 44th Blue Dragon Film Awards in December 2023, he was nominated in the Best New Actor and also received the Chung Chung Won Popular Star Award. The following year, he earned nominations for Most Popular Actor and Best New Actor at the 60th Baeksang Arts Awards.

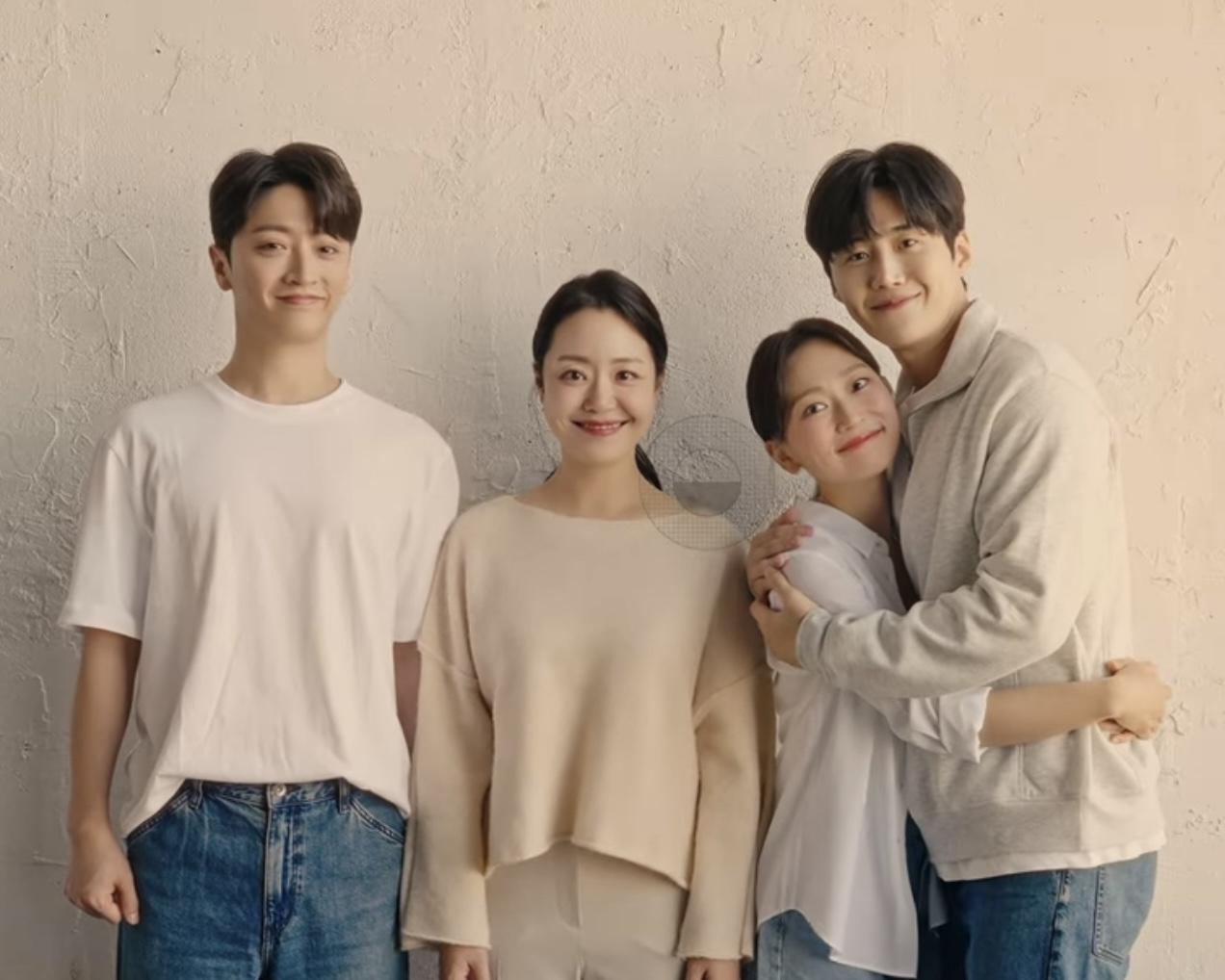
From left: Choi Jeong-heon as Jeong Ji-yong, Lee Ji-hae as Seo Tae-young, Kim Seul-gi as Lee Eun-soo, and Kim Seon-ho as Kim Woo-jin in promotional footage for the play Realise Happiness (2023)

In winter 2023, Kim reprised his role as an aspiring photographer in the adaptation of the 2019 play Memory in Dream [sic], which was renamed Realise Happiness. His character, originally named Eden, was localized to Korean as Kim Woo-jin. On October 20, 2023, theater company Content Haap announced that Kim would be triple-cast in this role alongside Ahn Woo-yeon and Lee Dong-ha. The play ran from December 5, 2023, to February 18, 2024, with all performances featuring Kim selling out.

Kim reunited with Welcome to Waikiki 2 co-star Moon Ga-young for Daesung's music video "Falling Slowly," directed by Hong Jong-chan. The video was released on March 5, 2024. Following this, Season 2 of Mukbo Brothers premiered on March 25 on SBS Plus, marking Kim's return to variety television and his reunion with 2 Days & 1 Night co-star Moon Se-yoon. The first four episodes followed Kim, Moon, and Kim Jun-hyun on a four-day, three-night trip to Thailand, as they toured Chiang Mai and Chiang Dao, including a visit to Elephant Nature Park to meet elephants and their caretaker, Sangduen Chailert.

Hosted by journalist Masayuki Furuya, a special pre-release stage greeting for The Childe in Tokyo on April 8, 2024, brought Kim together with 600 fans. To coincide with the official Japan premiere on April 12, cinemas in Marunouchi Piccadilly, Shinjuku, and Osaka's Namba Parks displayed the original nobleman costumes worn by Kim during filming. On April 30, Kim released the fan-dedicated digital single "Miracle" across major music platforms, which he co-wrote with lyricist Kim Ji-hyang. (Note: The song were composed by Seo Jeong-jin, Kim Do-hyun, and Lee Geun-soo) Prior to its official release, he debuted the song in February at the kickoff of his 2024 Asia tour. Kim then performed "Miracle" live across subsequent tour stops in Osaka, Tokyo, Manila, Seoul, and Jakarta.

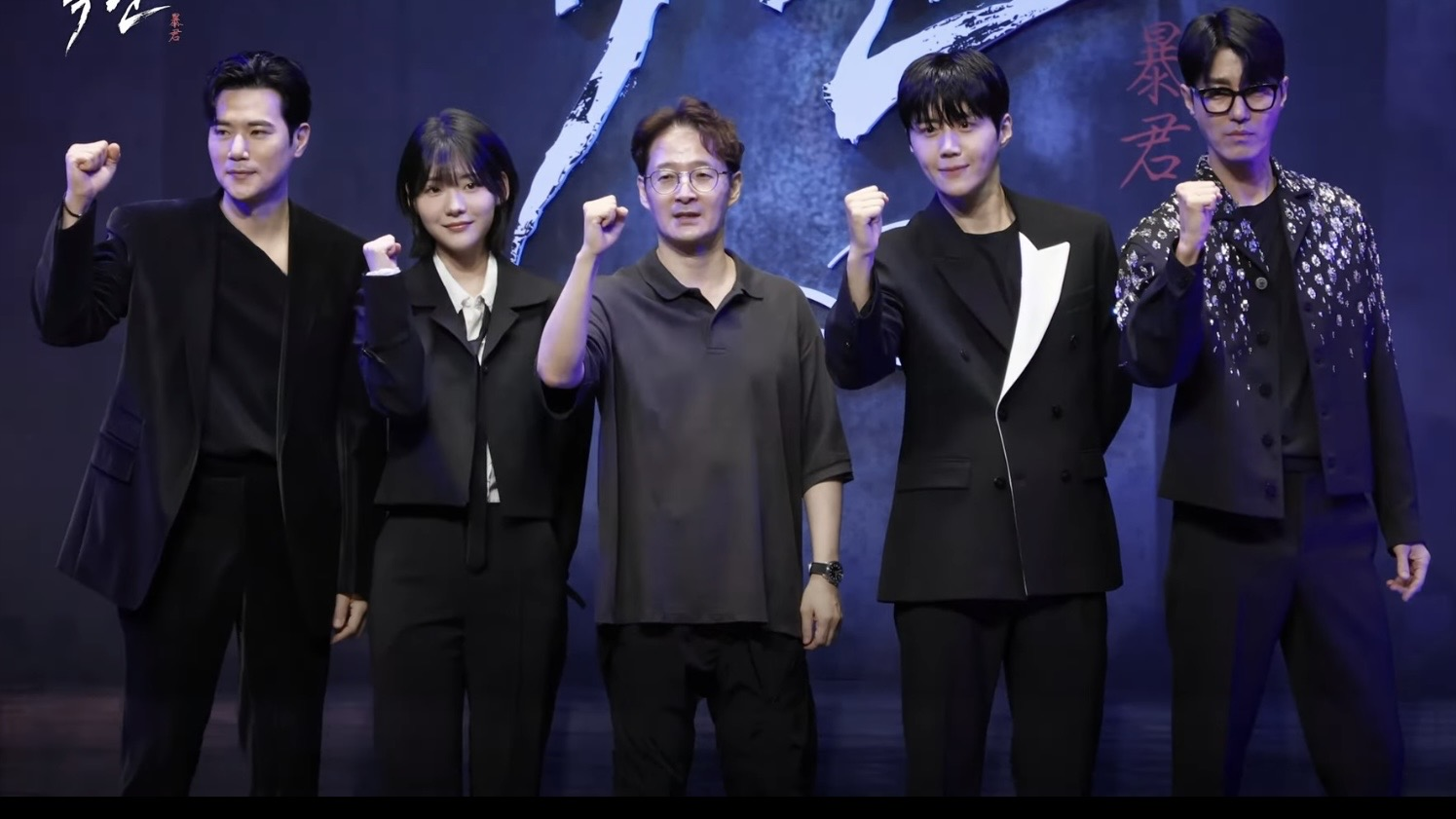
From left: Kim Kang-woo, Jo Yoon-su, director Park Hoon-jung, Kim Seon-ho, and Cha Seung-won at The Tyrant press conference in Seoul (2024)

On August 14, 2024, The Tyrant premiered on Disney+, supported by promotional activities in July and August ahead of its release. Initially produced as a feature film, the project was restructured into a four-part series, (Note: The format change was announced by Disney+ on February 19, 2024.) marking the first streaming series for Kim and director Park Hoon-jung. In the series, Kim portrays Director Choe, the youngest leader of South Korea's National Intelligence Service, who oversees a clandestine unit running the Tyrant Program. To prepare for the role, he drew inspiration from Tinker Tailor Soldier Spy and Peaky Blinders, lost seven kilograms to match his character's haggard appearance and practiced smoking for three months despite being a non-smoker. Writing for NME, Critic Carmen Chin praised Kim's performance, noting his "aloof yet grounded charisma that feels incredibly natural." His portrayal earned him nominations for Popular Male Actor Award and Best Male Actor in a Short Film/Web Drama at the 2024 APAN Star Awards, alongside a win for Outstanding Asian Star at the 2025 Seoul International Drama Awards.

=== 2025–present: Agency changes, streaming series and return to theater ===
In February 2025, Kim became a free agent before signing an exclusive contract with Fantagio the following month. In March 2025, Kim made a special appearance in writer Lim Sang-choon's Netflix series When Life Gives You Tangerines as Park Chung-seop, husband of Yang Geum-myeong (IU). Director Kim Won-seok noted that while Chung-seop becomes significant later in the series, he is not central to the main narrative. Despite the limited screentime, Kim ranked tenth in Good Data's "TV-OTT Drama Performer Buzzworthiness" list in the third week of March, and rose to third place the following week. Chung-seop's wedding scene initiated the "Kim Seon-ho Smile Challenge" on Chinese social media. A TikTok edit featuring Ariana Grande's song "Supernatural" went viral, encouraging further participation in the challenge. This prompted Grande to share a compilation of the challenge videos on her own social media accounts.

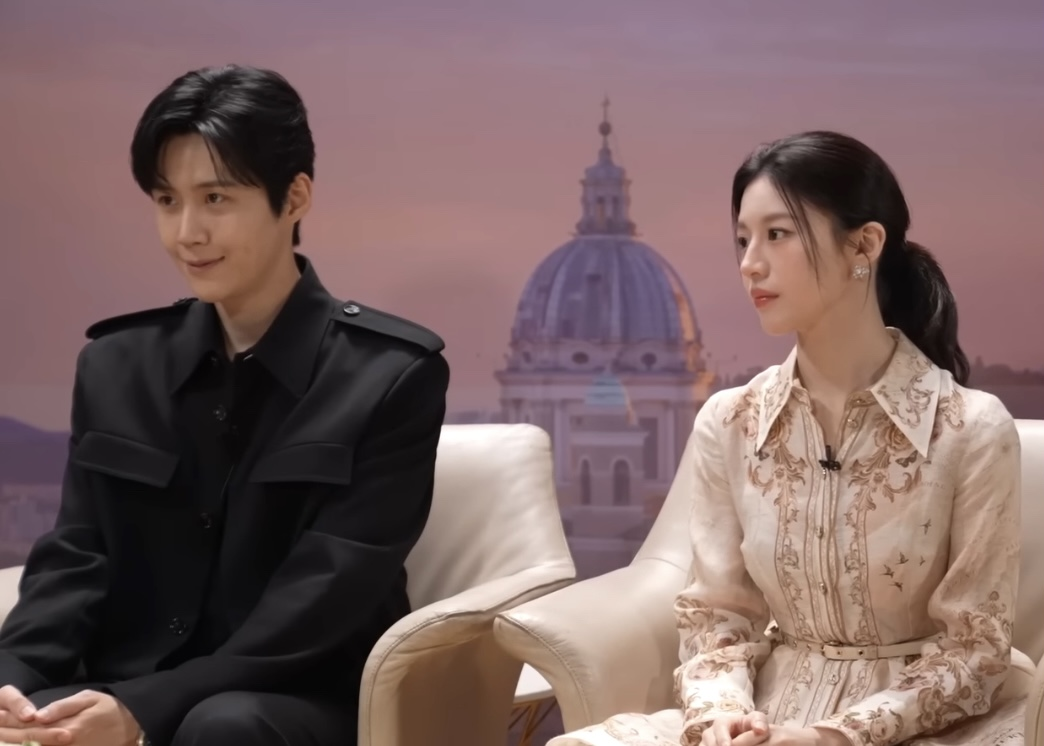
From left: Kim Seon-ho and Go Youn-jung during a press interview for Can This Love Be Translated in Jakarta (2026)

Kim returned to the romance genre with Netflix original series Can This Love Be Translated?, written by the Hong Sisters. On the series' release date, January 16, 2026, Kim, Go Youn-jung, and director Yoo Young-eun attended a promotional event in Jakarta, Indonesia. In the series, Kim portrayed Joo Ho-jin, a multilingual interpreter whose life becomes intertwined with top actress Cha Mu-hee, played by Go. To prepare for the role, Kim observed professional interpreters and completed four months of intensive Japanese, Italian, and English language courses; language coaches were also present on set to assist during filming. Filming took place from June 2024 to February 5, 2025, and spanned numerous locations across South Korea, Japan, Canada, and Italy. For this role, he received Best Actor nominations at the 2026 Global OTT Awards and the 5th Blue Dragon Series Awards.

Kim returned to the stage in the two-hander play Secret Passage: Interval. Directed by Min Sae-rom, this adaptation of Tomohiro Maekawa's Loophole Conference Room featured Kim as Dong-jae, a role requiring him to portray various reincarnated versions of the character. The play ran from February 13 to May 3, 2026, at the Nol Theater. Concurrently, Kim returned to variety television as a cast member of Bonjour Bakery. To prepare for his role, he completed barista training prior to filming. The show aired on Coupang Play from May 8 to June 29 and began rebroadcasting on KBS2 on August 5, marking the first time KBS has broadcast original OTT platform content. His work on the program earned him a Best New Entertainer nomination at the 5th Blue Dragon Series Awards.

His upcoming project includes the crime mystery series Unfriend, which is slated to premiere as a TVING original. Though filmed in 2023, the series, co-starring Park Gyu-young, was held for a 2026 launch. Co-directed by Kim Jee-woon and Park Bo-ram, the project is a joint production by Yong Film, Anthology Studio, and SK Global Entertainment, adapting Chan Ho-kei's crime novel Second Sister. Another upcoming project is the Disney+ series Portraits of Delusion. Directed by Han Jae-rim and based on Hongjacga's manhwa Delusion, the series reunited Kim with his Start-Up co-star Bae Suzy. Following a filming cycle that began in May 2025, the drama is scheduled to premiere in the second half of 2026. Kim is set to star alongside Kim Yoon-seok in an adaptation of the Kakao webnovel May the Congressman Protect You. Studio Dragon confirmed his casting on May 14, 2026, with the series scheduled to air in the first quarter of 2027.

== Acting artistry and influences ==
Kim regards theater as both "his starting point and his home," continually returning to the stage for its collaborative environment and the familiarity of working with trusted colleagues. He considers theater his most effective training ground to sharpen his skills and likens the repetitive nature of theatrical performance to squats, noting that repeating a simple phrase like "hello" for months generates subtle, organic shifts that are impossible onscreen, where finished lines cannot be revisited. Through this ongoing stage practice, he builds focus, viewing focus itself as a muscle that must be trained into a habit to deliver strong performances in any setting.

Influenced by several senior actors who serve as his mentors and role models, Kim has drawn guidance from each throughout his career. His admiration for Jo Jung-suk began during his freshman year, a period when he was filled with worries about acting; watching Jo star in the musical Grease (2005) left him deeply inspired by how naturally the actors handled both singing and acting. The two later co-starred in Two Cops (2017), which allowed Kim to learn from him in person. Having shared the stage with Kim So-jin in the play Closer (2016), Kim developed a deep appreciation for her elegance and total character immersion. He also looks to her film work as a benchmark, admiring her poised delivery and sharp enunciation in The King (2017). From Oh Man-seok, who directed him in True West (2015–2016), Kim learned foundational actor professionalism and grew to admire Oh's razor-sharp script analysis, specifically adopting Oh's practice of reading a full script in a single sitting and completing a minimum of 13 rereads prior to a performance.

Kim is known for his thorough preparation, including taking specialized courses for his roles and investing significant time in character research and development. Beginning with detailed script analysis and line memorization, he ensures his delivery sounds natural, noting that "acting is about bringing lines to life." To prevent his own speaking habits from bleeding into a character, he selects key lines and practices them with his manager or friends. He also repeats these lines in his head during daily activities and often recites them aloud while listening to music or taking in scenic views, continuing until he intuitively grasps the character's speech patterns. To minimize variables in his creative process, he incorporates a "drawing in" technique that channels personal emotion from direct and indirect experiences. Expanding his perspective further, he visualizes how his role models would approach a scene and experiments with techniques from established actors such as Lee Byung-hun and Song Kang-ho. He regards Song and Robert De Niro as the gold standards. Believing that "acting is a choice," he sees Song's acting as consistently making the right call, resulting in lifelike performances. He has cited a quiet moment in The Intern (2015), where De Niro simply sips coffee and reads a newspaper as inspiration for how a composed presence can create a vivid character.

Kim champions close collaboration with his costars. He also places great importance on communicating with directors and screenwriters, frequently asking questions to clarify a character's direction. Director Park Hoon-jung, who collaborated with him on The Childe (2023) and The Tyrant (2024), praised his solid fundamentals stemming from extensive theater experience and his ability to embody characters while filling directorial gaps. Reflecting on their second collaboration, Park stated that he requested very little from the actor and simply enjoyed watching his nuanced performance, noting that Kim successfully expresses decisiveness while conveying inner anguish.

== Other ventures ==
=== Endorsements ===
Following his rising profile in 2020, Kim became an endorser for various brands in South Korea and Southeast Asia, covering the apparel, technology, and lifestyle sectors. Media reports in 2021 coined the "Kim Seon-ho effect" to describe sales increases at several partner brands. In May 2021, Kim appeared in a promotional video for the 2021 P4G Seoul Summit, South Korea's first environmental multilateral summit. Released via Naver TV, KakaoTV and YouTube Channel of Korea Blue House, the video featured Kim introducing a venture-led solar panel project in Africa.

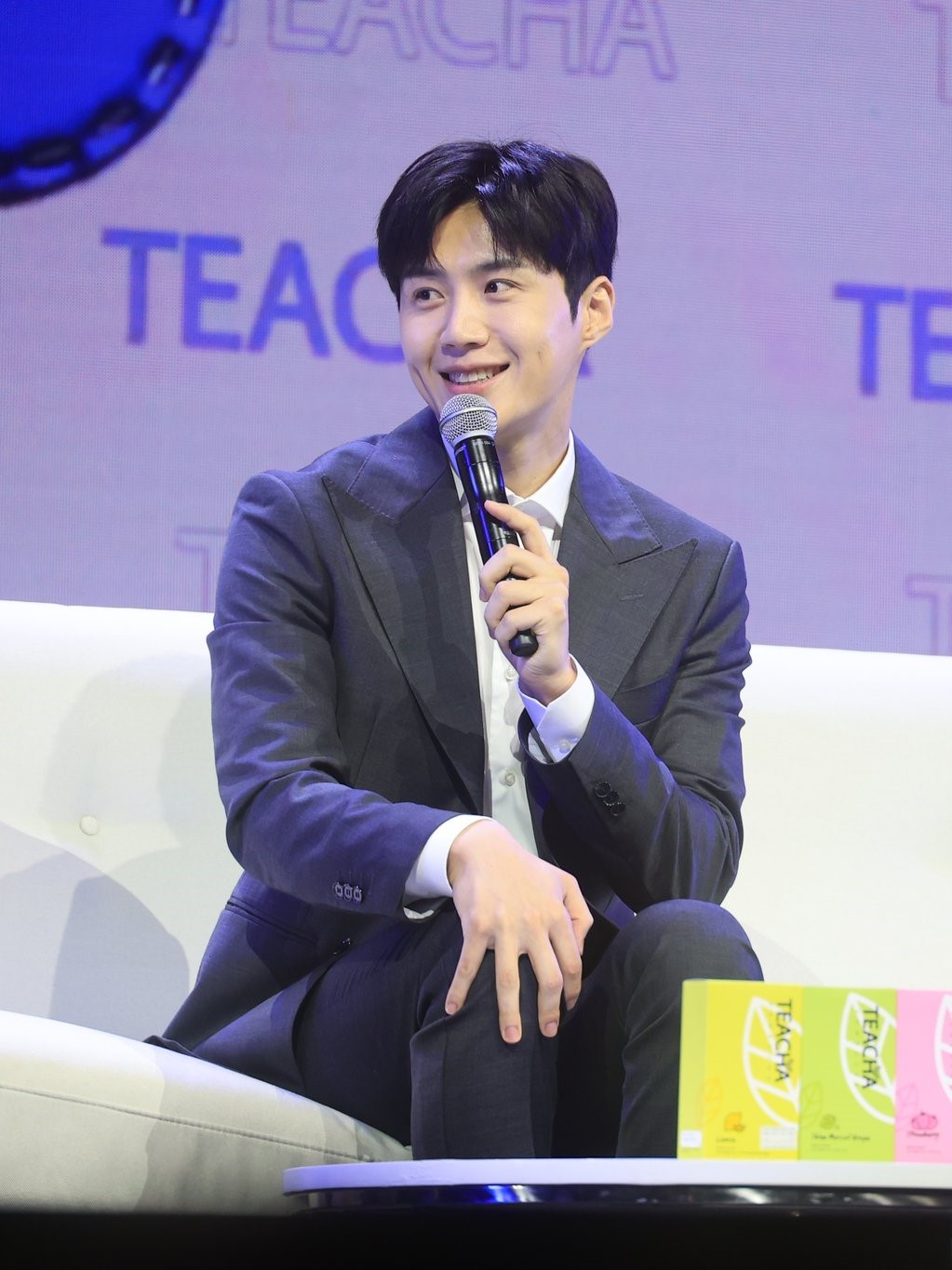
Kim attending a promotional event for Teacha in Bangkok (2023)

In late 2022, Kim held a fan signing event for the lifestyle brand Miima Mask in Gangnam, Seoul, attended by 100 raffle winners. In April 2023, he became the model for Korean sportswear brand Ballop. The following month, he signed with the Thai brand Teacha and later attended a meet-and-greet in Bangkok on May 5, 2023. Later that year, Kim was named global ambassador for Philippine brand Bench. His July promotional event in Manila drew over 6,000 attendees, where featured campaign items reportedly sold out.

His international endorsement portfolio continued to grow in 2024. In February, NutriAsia's UFC launched a line of Korean-inspired meal mixes with Kim as the official endorser, which later sponsored the Manila leg of his "Color+Full" Asia Tour on April 13. In May, he became the first brand presenter for the Thai skincare brand Dr. Pong, subsequently attending a meet-and-greet event in Bangkok on September 8. By fall, Kim was appointed as an ambassador for SC Johnson's brands, representing Mr. Muscle in Malaysia and the Philippines, as well as Duck in Thailand, in a campaign that included a contest for a tour package to Seoul, South Korea for two.

=== Philanthropy ===
Kim has engaged in ongoing philanthropic work, with particular emphasis on supporting vulnerable youth, elderly, health initiatives, and disaster relief. He frequently times major contributions to his birthday, which coincides with World Red Cross and Red Crescent Day. A consistent focus of these birthday donations has been supporting the independence of youth aging out of foster care, a cause selected by fans who voted on the allocation of proceeds from his fan meeting. (Note: The donation was funded by proceeds from Kim's 2022–2023 Asia tour, "One, Two, Three, Smile." The tour began with a stop in Seoul in December 2022, followed by dates in Manila, Bangkok, Hong Kong, Tokyo, Taipei, Jakarta, Kuala Lumpur, and Singapore. Spanning 11 shows across nine cities, the tour drew approximately 40,000 attendees.) Through the Korean Red Cross, he donated ₩100 million in 2023 to provide 146 individuals with essential items, learning devices, medical expenses, and a healing camp, followed by an additional ₩100 million in 2024, and ₩50 million in 2025.

Support for the elderly has formed another recurring theme. In September 2021, he collaborated with Marcoroho (Note: Mareukoroho (마르코로호; 'Marcoroho') is a South Korean social lifestyle brand founded in 2015 that focuses on empowering marginalized communities, particularly elderly women. The company sells handcrafted products, such as jewelry and stationery, that are made by these women, aiming to provide them with financial stability and a sense of purpose.) on the Happy Bean Special Funding Project, which raised funds for improved living conditions for the elderly. Within three days of its launch on September 3, the fundraiser surpassed its goal by 3600%, raising over ₩100 million. In 2026 he directed a ₩50 million birthday donation to the Korea Association of Senior Welfare Centers, (Note: Hanguk noin jonghap bokjigwan hyeophoe (한국노인종합복지관협회; 'The Korea Association of Senior Welfare Centers'), abbreviated as KASWC, is a national network of senior welfare facilities in South Korea. It supports policy initiatives, education, research, and collaborative networks to advance the development of senior centers and improve elderly welfare.) funding educational programs and social participation activities for older adults nationwide. The contribution was inspired by meaningful interactions with seniors during the filming of the variety program Bonjour Bakery.

In the field of public health, Kim participated in the 2018 Ice Bucket Challenge, a fundraising campaign by the ALS Association aimed to build Korea's first Lou Gehrig's Disease Rehabilitation Hospital. In January 2021, Kim donated ₩100 million to the Korea Childhood Leukemia Foundation (KCLF). (Note: Hanguk baekhyeolbyeong eorini jaedan (한국백혈병어린이재단; 'The Korea Childhood Leukemia Foundation'), abbreviated as KCLF, was formally established in 2000, having originated in 1991 as the Childhood Leukemia Supporters' Association. The nonprofit organization is dedicated to providing social services and medical treatment support to help children with leukemia successfully reintegrate into society in good health.) In February 2022, it was revealed that Kim made another donation of ₩50 million to the KCLF in mid-December 2021, a donation he initially asked to remain confidential.

Kim has also contributed to other causes. For disaster relief, he donated his entire theater fee from Touching the Void through the Hope Bridge Korea Disaster Relief Association (Note: Huimang beuriji jeonguk jaehae guho hyeophoe (희망브리지 전국재해구호협회; 'Hope Bridge National Disaster Relief Association') was established in 1961 by media and social organizations as a non-profit organization originally founded as the Korea Flood Damage Response Committee following Typhoon Sarah. It expanded its scope in 1964 and, following a 2001 amendment to the Disaster Relief Act, became South Korea's sole government-authorized organization for raising and distributing domestic natural disaster relief funds.) in September 2022 to support victims of Typhoon Hinnamnor. He later donated ₩50 million toward recovery efforts following wildfires in the Yeongnam region in early 2025. Kim supports animal welfare as well, donating personal belongings to the Anseong Princess Pyeonggang Animal Shelter Charity Bazaar, (Note: The Pyeonggang Princess Shelter Bazaar is an annual charity event for the Anseong Pyeonggang Princess Animal Shelter in Gyeonggi Province, South Korea, which houses and cares for hundreds of abandoned dogs and cats. The 2024 bazaar was organized by Beullu enjel bongsadan (블루엔젤봉사단; 'Blue Angel Volunteer Group') and the abandoned dog volunteer group Himnaegae (힘내개; 'Cheer up, Dogs').) with proceeds designated for animal care at the shelter.

== Personal life ==
On October 17, 2021, a user who identified herself as the ex-girlfriend of "Actor K" (later revealed to be Kim) made allegations on a Korean internet forum that the actor had 'coerced her into getting an abortion' while the two were dating. On October 20, 2021, in light of his ex-girlfriend's claims, Kim issued a public apology through his agency. As reports of the ex-girlfriend's claims spread, multiple advertisers halted campaigns that featured Kim, which according to Korea's Daily included popular international brands such as an American pizza restaurant chain and a Japanese camera brand. Kim stepped down from the permanent cast of the KBS variety show 2 Days & 1 Night, and subsequently withdrew from film projects Dog Days and Pretty Crazy.

On October 20, 2021, Kim's ex-girlfriend issued a new statement revealing that Kim had apologised to her personally; she also stated that there had been misunderstandings between them and expressed remorse at causing unintentional damage. On October 26, 2021, a South Korean media outlet published evidence challenging the accusations of Kim's ex-girlfriend, citing sources from close acquaintances of both parties; the report concluded that the decision to abort was mutual, that Kim had been supportive throughout the process, and that the pair had broken up the following year due to questionable circumstances involving the ex-girlfriend. Following the new reports, seven companies resumed advertisements featuring Kim. The production team of the film The Childe also announced their decision to retain Kim as a main cast member.

== Discography ==
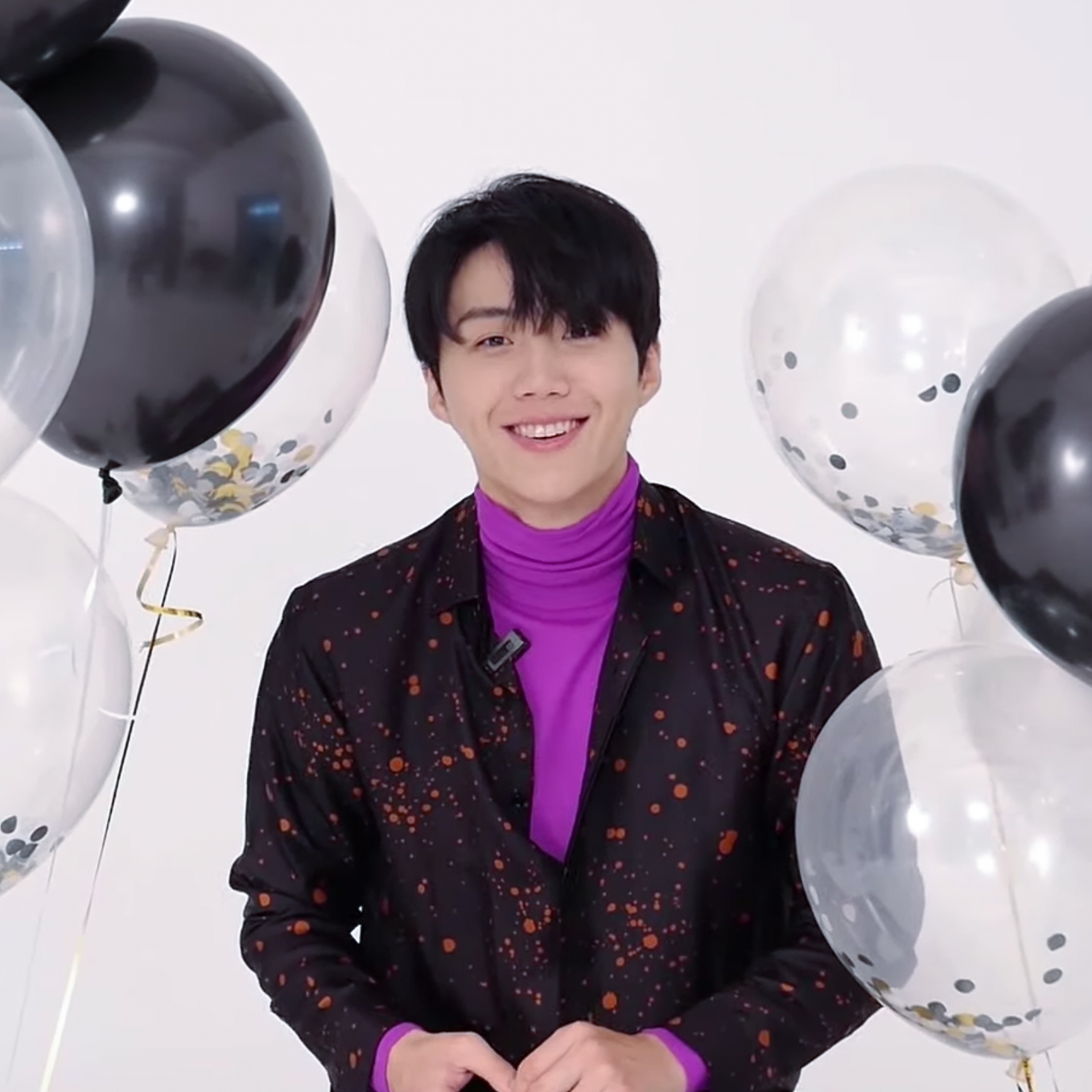
Kim's Marie Claire Korea's interview (2020)

=== Singles ===
Digital singles released by Kim
Title	Year	Peak chart positions	Album	Ref.
Title	Year	KOR Hot	Album	Ref.
"Waikiki (Actors Ver.)" (with Lee Yi-kyung, Shin Hyun-soo)	2019	—	Welcome to Waikiki 2 OST	
"Reason" (너라는 이유) (Epitone Project; Vocal by Kim Seon-ho)	2021	89	Non-album single	
"Miracle" (미라클) (Lyric by Kim Seon-ho and Kim Ji-hyang)	2024	—	Non-album single	
"—" denotes a recording that did not chart or was not released in that territory.

== Filmography ==
Selected filmography

- Two Cops (2017)
- Start-Up (2020)
- Hometown Cha-Cha-Cha (2021)
- The Childe (2023)
- The Tyrant (2024)
- Can This Love Be Translated? (2026)
