= List of awards and nominations received by Kim Seon-ho =

Kim Seon-ho awards and nominations
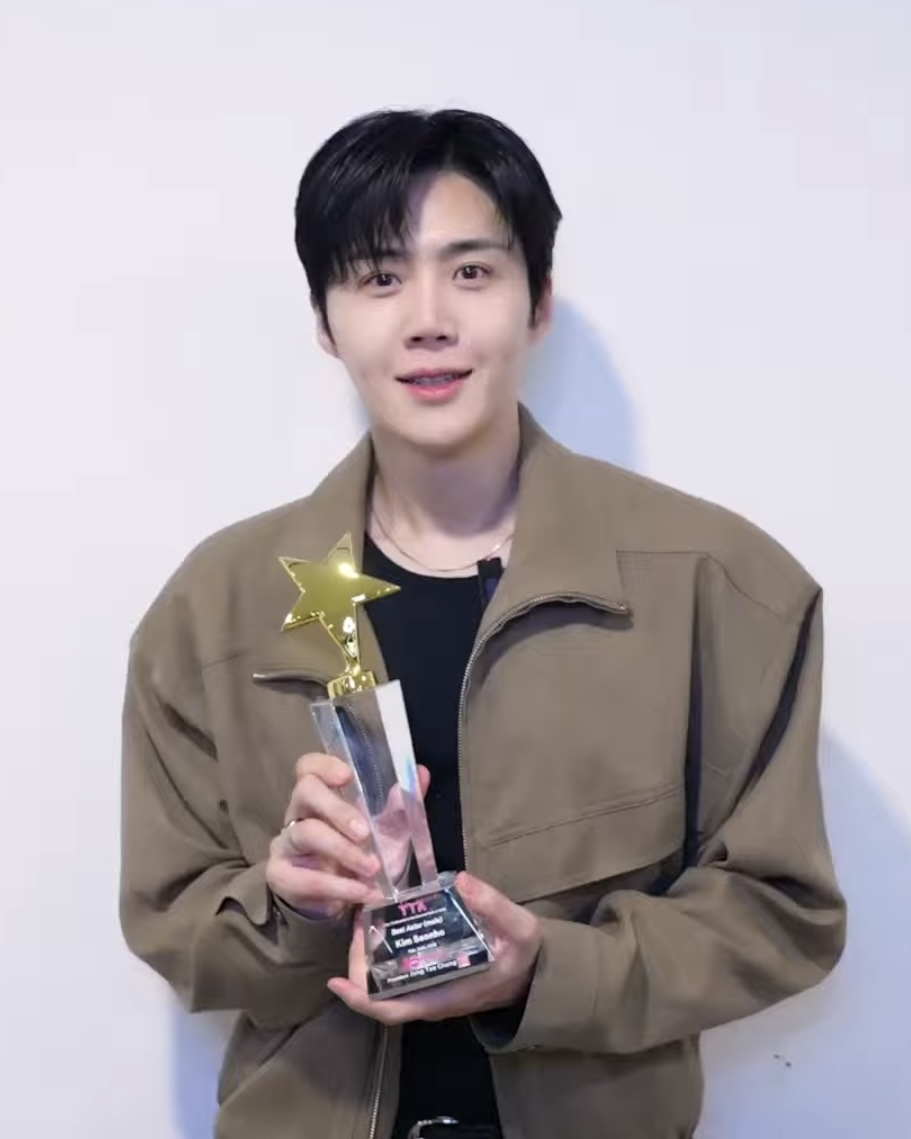
- Kim with his 14th Top Ten Awards (TTA) trophy (2026)
Awards and nominations
Award	Wins	Nominations
Asia Artist Awards	9	11
Asia Model Awards	1	1
APAN Star Awards	0	1
Asia Star Entertainer Awards	0	1
Baeksang Art Awards	1	4
Beautiful Foundation's Media Character Awards	1	1
Blue Dragon Film Awards	1	2
Blue Dragon Series Awards	0	2
Brand Customer Loyalty Awards	2	2
Buil Film Awards	1	2
Fundex Awards	1	0
Global OTT Awards	2	0
Grand Bell Awards	1	1
Interpark Golden Ticket Awards	0	1
KBS Drama Awards	0	1
KBS Entertainment Awards	1	1
Korea Broadcasting Awards	1	1
MBC Drama Awards	2	3
OBS Hot Icons Awards	1	1
SEC Awards	0	1
Seoul International Drama Awards	4	4
Seoul Global Movie Awards	0	1
Top Ten Awards	1	1

Totals (Note: Certain award groups do not simply award one winner. They acknowledge several different recipients, have runners-up, and have third place. Since this is a specific recognition and is different from losing an award, runner-up mentions are considered wins in this award tally. For simplification and to avoid errors, each award in this list has been presumed to have had a prior nomination.)
- Wins: 26
- Nominations: 51

South Korean actor Kim Seon-ho (Korean: 김선호) has been recognized with numerous awards and nominations in film and television. He has won a Baeksang Arts Award, one Blue Dragon Film Award, one Grand Bell Award, and one Buil Film Award. He has also won nine times at the Asia Artist Awards.

In his television debut year, Kim won Best New Actor and the Excellence Award for Actor in a Monday-Tuesday Drama at the 2017 MBC Drama Awards for his role in the drama Two Cops (2017). Kim's breakthrough role in Start-Up (2021) earned him the Most Popular Actor Award at the 57th Baeksang Arts Awards, alongside a nomination for Best Supporting Actor – Television at the same ceremony. For this role, he also received the Emotive Award at the Asia Artist Awards, and his character Han Ji-pyeong was recognized as one of the 2021 Seoul Drama Awards' characters of the year. Kim returned as the leading man in tvN romantic comedy series Hometown Cha-Cha-Cha (2021). In a year-end poll by Gallup Korea, Kim was named Gallup Korea's Television Actor of the Year. He also won Outstanding Actor at the 2022 Seoul Drama Awards.

Kim made his feature film debut in Park Hoon-jung's noir film The Childe (2023), where he was given top billing status. His portrayal of the nobleman in his debut film earned critical acclaim, leading to his winning the New Actor Award at the 32nd Buil Film Awards and the 59th Grand Bell Awards. In December 2023, Kim was nominated in the New Actor Award category and also received the Chung Chung Won Popular Star Award at the 44th Blue Dragon Film Awards. He also earned nominations in the Most Popular Actor and Best New Actor categories at the subsequent year's 60th Baeksang Arts Awards.

Kim's performance as Joo Ho-jin in his first Netflix original series Can This Love Be Translated? (2026) received numerous accolades. He and Go were nominated in the Fan Choice Couple category at the 2026 Asia Star Entertainer Awards. He secured nominations for Best Lead Actor and the People's Choice Award for Male Actor at the 2026 Global OTT Awards, as well as Best Performance in an International Series at the SEC Awards. Further recognition followed with Best Actor and Popularity Award nominations at the 2026 Blue Dragon Series Awards, as well as nominations for Best Actor in International Competition and Outstanding Asian Star at the 2026 Seoul International Drama Awards.

== Awards and nominations ==
Name of the award ceremony, year presented, category, nominee of the award, and the result of the nomination
Award ceremony	Year	Category	Nominee / Work	Result	Ref.
APAN Star Awards	2024	Best Actor in a Short/Web Drama	The Tyrant	Nominated	
APAN Star Awards	2024	Popular Male Actor	The Tyrant	Nominated	
Asia Artist Awards	2020	Best Emotive Award – Actor	Kim Seon-ho	Won	
Asia Artist Awards	2020	Popularity Award – Actor	Kim Seon-ho	Nominated	
Asia Artist Awards	2021	RET Popularity Award – Actor	Kim Seon-ho	Won	
Asia Artist Awards	2021	U+Idol Live Popularity Award – Actor	Kim Seon-ho	Won	
Asia Artist Awards	2022	Asia Celebrity Award – Actor	Kim Seon-ho	Won	
Asia Artist Awards	2022	Best Choice Award – Actor	Kim Seon-ho	Won	
Asia Artist Awards	2022	DCM Popularity Award – Actor	Kim Seon-ho	Won	
Asia Artist Awards	2022	Idol Plus Popularity Award – Actor	Kim Seon-ho	Won	
Asia Artist Awards	2023	Asia Celebrity Award – Actor	Kim Seon-ho	Won	
Asia Artist Awards	2023	Best Artist Award – Actor	Kim Seon-ho	Won	
Asia Artist Awards	2023	Idol Plus Popularity Award – Actor	Kim Seon-ho	Nominated	
Asia Artist Awards	2024	Idol Plus Popularity Award – Actor	Kim Seon-ho	Nominated	
Asia Model Awards (Note: Asia Model Awards is an annual ceremony that recognizes Asia's top models and celebrities.)	2020	Model Star Award	Kim Seon-ho	Won	
Asia Star Entertainer Awards	2026	Fan Choice Couple	Can This Love Be Translated (Note: Couple nomination with Go Youn-jung)	Nominated	
Baeksang Arts Awards	2021	Best Supporting Actor – Television	Start-Up	Nominated	
Baeksang Arts Awards	2021	Most Popular Actor	Kim Seon-ho	Won	
Baeksang Arts Awards	2024	Best New Actor – Film	The Childe	Nominated	
Blue Dragon Film Awards	2023	Best New Actor	The Childe	Nominated	
Blue Dragon Film Awards	2023	Chung Jung-won Popular Star Award	The Childe	Won	
The Beautiful Foundation Media Character Awards (Note: The Media Character Awards Ceremony was organized by The Beautiful Foundation to recognize nuanced portrayals of youth aging out of foster care. Winners were chosen through a survey and public vote, with a total of 645 participants.)	2022	Eighteen Adults Awards	Han Ji-pyeong of Start-Up	Runner-up	
Blue Dragon Series Awards	2026	Best Actor	Can This Love Be Translated?	Nominated	
Blue Dragon Series Awards	2026	Best New Entertainer	Bonjour Bakery	Nominated	
Brand Customer Loyalty Awards (Note: Brand Customer Loyalty Awards is an annual event which selects and awards the most influential brands in society and popular culture, determined through national consumer surveys. It is organized by the Korea Consumer Forum and Brand Keys, a top 10 American brand consulting organization.)	2021	Trend Icon – Actor	Kim Seon-ho	Won	
Brand Customer Loyalty Awards	2021	Male Multitainer	Kim Seon-ho	Won	
Buil Film Awards	2023	Best New Actor	The Childe	Won	
Buil Film Awards	2023	Popular Star Award	The Childe	Nominated	
Fundex Awards	2026	People's Choice Award — Male Actor	Can This Love Be Translated	Pending	
Global OTT Awards	2026	Best Lead Actor	Can This Love Be Translated?	Nominated	
Global OTT Awards	2026	People's Choice Award — Male Actor	Kim Son-ho	Nominated	
Grand Bell Awards	2023	Best New Actor	The Childe	Won	
Interpark Golden Ticket Awards	2023	Best Actor in a Play	Touching The Void	Nominated	
KBS Drama Awards	2017	Best New Actor	Strongest Deliveryman and Good Manager	Nominated	
KBS Entertainment Awards	2020	Rookie Award – Show/Variety Category	2 Days & 1 Night Season 4	Won	
Korea Broadcasting Award	2021	Popularity Award – Entertainer	2 Days & 1 Night Season 4	Won	
MBC Drama Awards	2017	Excellence Award, Actor in a Monday-Tuesday Drama	Two Cops	Won	
MBC Drama Awards	2017	Best New Actor	Two Cops	Won	
MBC Drama Awards	2017	Best Comic Character	Two Cops	Nominated	
OBS Hot Icon Awards (Note: OBS Hot Icon Awards is an entertainment popularity award given by OBS Gyeongin TV since 2013.)	2022	2022 Hot Icon Award 'Proven Trend'	Kim Seon-ho	Won	
SEC Awards (Note: The SEC Awards, formerly known as the Séries em Cena Awards, is a Brazilian award show that honors achievements in music, film, television, and internet culture in Brazil and globally.)	2026	Performance in an Asian Series	Can This Love Be Translated?	Nominated	
Seoul Global Movie Awards	2025	Popularity Award – Actor	The Tyrant	Nominated	
Seoul International Drama Awards	2021	Character of the Year	Han Ji-pyeong of Start-Up	Won	
Seoul International Drama Awards	2022	Outstanding Korean Actor	Hometown Cha-Cha-Cha	Won	
Seoul International Drama Awards	2025	Outstanding Asian Star	The Tyrant	Won	
Seoul International Drama Awards	2026	International category — Best Actor	Can This Love Be Translated?	Nominated	
Seoul International Drama Awards	2026	Outstanding Asian Star (South Korea)	Can This Love Be Translated?	Nominated	
Top Ten Awards	2026	Best Global Artist – Best Actor	Kim Seon-ho	Won	

== Listicles ==
Name of publisher, year listed, name of listicle, and placement
Publisher	Year	Listicle	Placement	Ref.
Allure Korea	2016	Rising Stars, New Faces on Stage	Shortlist (Note: Shortlisted with Jang Eun-ah, Lim Bye-ol, and Kim Sung-cheol)	
Cine21	2020	New Actors to watch out for in 2021	3rd	
Cine21	2021	New Actors to watch out for in 2022	5th (Note: Kim Seon-ho mentioned together with Rowoon, Wi Ha-joon, Song Kang, Byeon Woo-seok, Lee Jun-young)	
Cine21	2021	Actors to watch out for in 2022	6th (Note: Kim Seon-ho mentioned together with Wi Ha-joon, Kim Soo-hyun, Jo Jung-suk, Park Jeong-min, Song Kang-ho, Ma Dong-seok, Ahn Bo-hyun, Ryu Jun-yeol, Choi Woo-shik)	
Cine21	2026	Actors to watch out for in 2026	4th	
Forbes Korea	2021	Power Celebrity 40	31st	
Gallup Korea	2020	Television Actor of the Year	17th	
Gallup Korea	2021	Television Actor of the Year	1st	
Gallup Korea	2022	Television Actor of the Year	20th	
Joy News 24	2021	Actor of the Year	4th	
Joy News 24	2021	Best Drama Couple	1st (Note: Hometown Cha-Cha-Cha couple with Shin Min-a)	
Joy News 24	2023	Rising Star Film Actor of the Year	5th (Note: Tied for 5th place with 6 votes each with Do Kyung-soo, Kang Tae-joo and Lee Shin-young)	
Joy News 24	2026	Best Drama Couple of the Year	Runner-up (Note: Can This Love Be Translated couple with Go Youn-jung)	
Joy News 24	2026	Best Actor of the Year	9th (Note: Tied in 9th place: Kim Seon-ho, Park Ji-hoon, Lim Ji-yeon, and Kim Yoo-jung with 4 votes.)	
Joy News 24	2026	Power People of the Year	13th (Note: Tied in rank 13th: Kim Seon-ho, Kim Ji-won, Lee Chang-dong, Heo Nam-jun, Ateez Choi San, BigBang, and Moon Sang-min with 2 votes.)	
Movie Walker Press	2024	10 Korean Actors that Movie Writers Recommended in 2024	Top 10	
Numero Tokyo	2026	[Korean Dramas of the First Half of 2026] Which handsome actors and beloved dramas do industry insiders choose as their favorites?	Shortlisted	
Sports Dong-a	2018	The Star that will Shine in 2018 (Actor)	Shortlisted (Note: Shortlisted with Dong-ha, Seo Eun-soo, Won Jin-ah, and Ha Jun)	
Wavve	2020	Wavve Award Popular Star (Note: Winners were picked by star-specific Wavve editor.)	3rd	

== See also ==
- Kim Seon-ho discography
- Kim Seon-ho filmography
- List of Kim Seon-ho live performances
