= Welcome to Waikiki 2 =

2019 South Korean television series

- Promotional poster
- Also known as: Waikiki 2; Laughter in Waikiki 2; Go Go Waikiki 2; Woohoo Waikiki 2
- Hangul: 으라차차 와이키키 2
- RR: Eurachacha Waikiki 2
- MR: Ŭrach'ach'a Waik'ik'i 2
- Genre: Comedy; Slice of life
- Written by: Kim Ki-ho; Song Ji-eun; Song Mi-so; Seo Dong-bum
- Directed by: Lee Chang-min
- Starring: Lee Yi-kyung; Kim Seon-ho; Shin Hyun-soo; Moon Ka-young; Ahn So-hee; Kim Ye-won
- Country of origin: South Korea
- Original language: Korean
- No. of episodes: 16

Production
- Producers: Baek Chang-ju; Park Jin-hyung; Park Jun-seo
- Running time: 70 minutes
- Production companies: C-JeS Entertainment; Drama House

Original release
- Network: JTBC
- Release: March 25 – May 14, 2019

Welcome to Waikiki 2 (Korean: 으라차차 와이키키 2; RR: Eurachacha Waikiki 2) is a 2019 South Korean television series starring Lee Yi-kyung, Kim Seon-ho, Shin Hyun-soo, Moon Ka-young, Ahn So-hee and Kim Ye-won. It is the sequel to the 2018 series of the same title. It aired on JTBC from March 25 to May 14, 2019, every Monday and Tuesday at 21:30 (KST).

== Cast ==
=== Main ===
- Lee Yi-kyung as Lee Joon-ki

The CEO of Waikiki Guesthouse, who dreams of becoming a famous actor.

- Kim Seon-ho as Cha Woo-sik

Joon-ki's high school friend who invested in the Waikiki Guesthouse. He dreams of becoming a musician.

- Shin Hyun-soo as Kook Ki-bong

Joon-ki's high school friend who invested in the Waikiki Guesthouse. He dreams of becoming a baseball player.

- Moon Ga-young as Han Soo-yeon

The first love of Joon-ki, Woo-sik and Ki-bong. After her wedding was called off, she has to learn how to earn money for herself.

- Ahn So-hee as Kim Jeong-eun

Joon-ki's university friend who dreams of becoming an actress. In the meantime, she does part-time jobs, and later falls in love with Joon-ki.

- Kim Ye-won as Cha Yoo-ri

Woo-sik's manipulative older sister. She knows how to use other people's weaknesses to get what she wants. She dreams of having her own restaurant, and later falls in love with Ki-bong.

=== Supporting ===
- Jeon Soo-kyeong as the owner of Waikiki Guesthouse (eps. 1–2, 16)
- Song Young-jae as the coach of baseball team
- Jung Eun-woo as Min-seok (eps. 1–2)

Soo-yeon's ex-fiancée.

- Jung In-gi as Soo-yeon's father (eps. 1–2, 16)

=== Special appearances ===
- Lee Jun-hyeok as a director with amnesia (ep. 1)
- Kim Hyeong-beom as a director (ep. 2)
- Kim Young-dae as Kook Ki-bong's successful baseball junior at the baseball academy (ep. 2)
- Joo Sang-wook as Kang Min-ho (ep. 2)

A top star.

- Jung Man-sik as a lender (ep. 2)
- Oh Na-ra as lender's wife (ep. 2)
- Moon Hee-kyung as Min-seok's mother (ep. 2)
- Lee Si-eon as a producer (ep. 3)
- Lee Jung-eun as Kimbap Heavenly owner (ep. 3)
- Kim Young-woong as a zookeeper (ep. 3)
- Im Kang-sung as Yu-min (ep. 4)

A top star.

- Byeon Woo-seok as Yoon Seo-jun (ep. 4)
- Park Ah-in as Da-young (ep. 5)
- In Gyo-jin as Kwak Ha-ni (ep. 5)
- Kim Yeon-woo as Woo-sik's senior (ep. 6)
- Shim Hyung-tak as Byeong-cheol sunbae (eps. 6–7)

Gi-bong's senior in baseball academy.

- Kim Ki-cheon as a beggar (ep. 7)
- Shin Hyun-jong as a protester (ep. 7)
- Oh Hee-joon as a pervert (ep. 7)
- Yoon Ji-won as a Waikiki guest (ep. 7)
- Kim Kwang-sik as Park Yong-pal (ep. 8)

The gangster boss.

- Lee Hee-jin as Kang Mi-young (ep. 8)

The boss's wife.

- Heo Tae-hee as Sang-woo (eps. 8–9)

A news anchor.

- Kim Jong-pal as Park Cho-rong (ep. 9)

A sheep-rancher.

- Kim Joo-ryoung as a speech teacher (ep. 9)
- Kim Il-jung as a quiz show host (ep. 10)
- Yang Joo-ho as a Waikiki guest (ep. 10)
- Yeom Dong-heon as Jang Jun-hyeok (ep. 11)
- Yoon Hee-seok (ep. 12)
- Bang Jun-ho (ep. 12)

== Production ==
Kang Han-na was offered to play one of the lead roles, but she declined. Kim Jung-hyun, who starred in the first season, declined an offer to return. Lee Yi-kyung is the only lead actor from the original series who reprise his role in the second season. The first script reading took place on January 21, 2019, at the JTBC Building in Sangam-dong.

== Original soundtrack ==
Welcome to Waikiki 2 OST

Soundtrack album by Various artists
- Released: 2019
- Genre: Soundtrack
- Languages: Korean; English
- Label: Warner Music Korea

=== Part 1 ===
Released on March 25, 2019
No.	Title	Lyrics	Music	Artist	Length
1.	"Waikiki"	Han Joon; Park Se-joon	Lee Yoo-jin; Park Se-joon	Na Sung-ho (Noel)	3:06
2.	"Waikiki (Actors Ver.)"	Han Joon; Park Se-joon	Lee Yoo-jin; Park Se-joon	Kim Seon-ho; Lee Yi-kyung; Shin Hyun-soo	3:06
3.	"Waikiki" (Inst.)		Lee Yoo-jin; Park Se-joon		3:06
4.	"Waikiki (Actors Ver.)" (Inst.)		Lee Yoo-jin; Park Se-joon		3:06
Total length:					12:24

=== Part 2 ===
Released on April 1, 2019
No.	Title	Lyrics	Music	Artist	Length
1.	"OMG!" (이게 뭐야! 왜이래!)	Han Joon; Park Se-joon	Seo Jae-ha; Park Se-joon	Gu Yoon-hoe	3:23
2.	"OMG!" (Inst.)		Seo Jae-ha; Park Se-joon		3:23
Total length:					6:46

=== Part 3 ===
Released on April 8, 2019
No.	Title	Lyrics	Music	Artist	Length
1.	"Delight"	Park Se-joon; Han Joon; Namgoong Ki-chan	Park Se-joon; Kim Young-sung; Namgoong Ki-chan	Kriesha Chu	3:23
2.	"Delight" (Inst.)		Park Se-joon; Kim Young-sung; Namgoong Ki-chan		3:23
Total length:					6:46

=== Part 4 ===
Released on April 15, 2019
No.	Title	Lyrics	Music	Artist	Length
1.	"How Can I Do"	Han Joon; Park Se-joon	Lee Yoo-jin; Park Se-joon	Pentagon (Note: Credited as a song by Pentagon, sung by members Hui, Jinho and Wooseok)	3:22
2.	"How Can I Do" (Inst.)		Lee Yoo-jin; Park Se-joon		3:22
Total length:					6:44

=== Part 5 ===
Released on April 22, 2019
No.	Title	Lyrics	Music	Artist	Length
1.	"Even For 1 Minute" (1분이라도)	Han Joon; Park Se-joon	Lee Yoo-jin; Park Se-joon	Park Yong-in (Urban Zakapa)	3:43
2.	"Even For 1 Minute" (Inst.)		Lee Yoo-jin; Park Se-joon		3:43
Total length:					7:26

=== Part 6 ===
Released on April 29, 2019
No.	Title	Lyrics	Music	Artist	Length
1.	"Looking The Stars"	Han Joon; Park Se-joon	Lee Yoo-jin; Park Se-joon	WANNA	3:28
2.	"Looking The Stars" (Inst.)		Lee Yoo-jin; Park Se-joon		3:28
Total length:					6:58

=== Part 7 ===
Released on May 6, 2019
No.	Title	Lyrics	Music	Artist	Length
1.	"Forever More"	Han Joon; Park Se-joon	Lee Yoo-jin; Park Se-joon	Seol Ha-yoon	3:10
2.	"Forever More" (Inst.)		Lee Yoo-jin; Park Se-joon		3:10
Total length:					6:20

== Ratings ==
Welcome to Waikiki 2 : South Korea viewers per episode (thousands)

Season	Episode number																Average
Season	1	2	3	4	5	6	7	8	9	10	11	12	13	14	15	16	Average
2	570	456	TBD	TBD	TBD	TBD	TBD	TBD	TBD	TBD	TBD	TBD	TBD	TBD	TBD	TBD	TBD

Source: Audience measurement performed nationwide by Nielsen Media Research.

Average TV viewership ratings
Ep.	Original broadcast date	Title	Average audience share
Ep.	Original broadcast date	Title	AGB Nielsen (nationwide)
1	March 25, 2019	The Smile Has Left Your Eyes (하늘에서 내리는 1억 개의 별)	2.118%
1	March 25, 2019	On Your Wedding Day (너의 결혼식)	2.118%
2	March 26, 2019	Butterfly Effect (나비효과)	1.769%
2	March 26, 2019	Magical Princess Minky Momo (요술공주 밍키)	1.769%
3	April 1, 2019	Fantastic Beasts and Where to Find Them (신비한 동물사전)	1.997%
3	April 1, 2019	Worlds Within (그들이 사는 세상)	1.997%
4	April 2, 2019	I Saw the Devil (악마를 보았다)	1.752%
4	April 2, 2019	Only I Didn't Know (나만 몰랐던 이야기)	1.752%
5	April 8, 2019	Crying Fist (주먹이 운다)	1.971%
5	April 8, 2019	On the Pitch (Note: Titled after the 2010 South Korean movie) (꿈은 이루어진다)	1.971%
6	April 9, 2019	The Innocent Man (세상 어디에도 없는 착한남자)	1.636%
6	April 9, 2019	Encounter (남자친구)	1.636%
7	April 15, 2019	Our Twisted Hero (우리들의 일그러진 영웅)	1.492%
7	April 15, 2019	The Last Match (마지막 승부)	1.492%
8	April 16, 2019	A Bittersweet Life (달콤한 인생)	1.389%
8	April 16, 2019	Dear My Friends (디어 마이 프렌즈)	1.389%
9	April 22, 2019	Everything About My Male Friend (내 남친의 모든 것)	1.390%
9	April 22, 2019	Extreme Job (극한직업)	1.390%
10	April 23, 2019	Adults Don't Know (Note: Titled after the 1988 South Korean movie) (어른들은 몰라요)	1.489%
10	April 23, 2019	Busted (범인은 바로 너)	1.489%
11	April 29, 2019	Should I Say I Love You Again? (Note: Titled after Kim Dong-ryul's song) (다시 사랑한다 말할까?)	1.407%
11	April 29, 2019	Between Love And Friendship (Note: Titled after Park Hye-kyung's song) (사랑과 우정사이)	1.407%
12	April 30, 2019	Your Name (너의 이름은)	1.171%
12	April 30, 2019	Love Guide for Dumpees (극적인 하룻밤)	1.171%
13	May 6, 2019	The Girls Who Climbed Out of the Window and Disappeared (Note: Titled after the 2013 film The Hundred-Year-Old Man Who Climbed Out of the Window and Disappeared) (창문 넘어 도망친 소녀)	1.324%
13	May 6, 2019	Even If You Get Cheated by World (Note: Titled after Kim Jang-hoon's song) (세상이 그대를 속일지라도)	1.324%
14	May 7, 2019	Everybody Has Secrets (누구나 비밀은 있다)	1.421%
14	May 7, 2019	Scar Deeper Than Love (Note: Titled after Yim Jae-beom & Lena Park's song) (사랑보다 깊은 상처)	1.421%
15	May 13, 2019	Can I Love You? (사랑해도 될까요)	1.103%
15	May 13, 2019	One Day Suddenly (어느 날 갑자기)	1.103%
16	May 14, 2019	Goodbye Waikiki (굿바이 와이키키)	1.496%
Average			1.558%
In the table above, the blue numbers represent the lowest ratings and the red numbers represent the highest ratings.; This drama aired on a cable channel/pay TV which normally has a relatively smaller audience compared to free-to-air TV/public broadcasters (KBS, SBS, MBC and EBS).
