= Mukbo Brothers =

South Korean reality-variety show

- Hangul: 먹고 보는 형제들
- Lit.: Brothers Who Eat and Watch
- RR: Meokgo boneun hyeongjedeul
- MR: Mŏkko ponŭn hyŏngjedŭl
- Genre: Variety show
- Directed by: Kim Jae-hyung; Um Jae-hyun; Lee Kwang-bok; Baek Seung-mi; Ku Ye-seul; Kang Ri-a; Yoon Cho-ha; Choi Yong-hoon
- Starring: Kim Jun-hyun; Moon Se-yoon
- Country of origin: South Korea
- Original language: Korean
- No. of seasons: 2
- No. of episodes: 18 (Pilot/Season 1: 10, Season 2: 8)

Production
- Executive producer: Lee Yang-hwa
- Producer: Hwang In-mok
- Running time: 110 minutes

Original release
- Network: SBS Plus
- Release: September 5, 2023 – May 13, 2024

Eating and Seeing Brothers (Korean: 먹고 보는 형제들) abbreviated as Mukbo Brothers (먹보형) is a South Korean variety show that features professional "mukbang" stars on a real overseas food travel journey.

== Cast ==
=== Main cast ===
- Kim Jun-hyun
- Moon Se-yoon

=== Special cast members ===
- Kim Seon-ho (Season 2, Episodes 1–4)
- Jung Hyuk (Season 2, Episodes 5–8)
- Um Ji-yoon (Season 2, Episodes 5–8)

=== Special appearance ===
- Sangduen Chailert
- Mawin Thaweephon
- Piyawadee Maleenont.

== Broadcast timeline ==
The program aired across several segments:

- Pilot episode: September 5, 2023 – September 26, 2023
- Season 1: November 7, 2023 – December 12, 2023
- Season 2: March 25, 2024 – May 13, 2024

Season 2
Ep.	Original broadcast date	Location
1	March 25, 2024	Thailand
2	March 31, 2024	Thailand
3	April 7, 2024	Thailand
4	April 15, 2024	Thailand
5	April 22, 2024	Taiwan
6	April 29, 2024	Taiwan
7	May 6, 2024	Taiwan
8	May 13, 2024	Taiwan
