= Strongest Deliveryman =

2017 South Korean television series

- Promotional poster
- Hangul: 최강 배달꾼
- Hanja: 最強 配達꾼
- RR: Choegang baedalkkun
- MR: Ch'oegang paedalkkun
- Genre: Slice of life; Drama; Romance
- Written by: Lee Jeong-woo
- Directed by: Jeon Woo-sung
- Creative directors: Kim Gil-yong; Choi Dong-sook
- Starring: Go Kyung-pyo; Chae Soo-bin; Kim Seon-ho; Go Won-hee
- Composer: Park Sung-jin
- Country of origin: South Korea
- Original language: Korean
- No. of episodes: 16

Production
- Executive producers: Kim Sang-hwi; Ahn Hyung-jo
- Producers: Kim Shin-il; Jeon Je-yeon
- Cinematography: Uhm Joon-sung; Lee Young-seop
- Editor: Oh Dong-hee
- Camera setup: Single camera
- Running time: 60 min
- Production companies: Jidam Inc. Web TV Asia (Note: Web TV Asia (stylized as WEB TV ASIA) is a pan-Asian multimedia production company under the auspices of Malaysia-based entertainment firm Prodigee Media Sdn. Bhd. Strongest Deliveryman is its debut Korean drama production.)

Original release
- Network: KBS2
- Release: August 4 – September 23, 2017

Strongest Deliveryman (Korean: 최강 배달꾼; RR: Choegang baedalkkun) is a 2017 South Korean television series starring Go Kyung-pyo, Chae Soo-bin, Kim Seon-ho, and Go Won-hee. It premiered on August 4, 2017, and aired every Friday and Saturday at 23:00 (KST) on KBS2 until September 23, 2017.

== Synopsis ==
Choi Kang-soo is a deliveryman who wants to become the CEO of his own delivery app company. The series tells of his journey to achieving love and success.

== Cast ==
=== Main ===
- Go Kyung-pyo as Choi Kang-soo

A veteran deliveryman who puts his life on the line at whatever he does.

- Chae Soo-bin as Lee Dan-ah

A delivery woman who is so single-minded about making money and escaping from "Hell Joseon" that she turns down all advances from men.

- Kim Seon-ho as Oh Jin-kyu

A rich man's son, the former Head Manager of Jung Family Seollongtang, he is stubborn at first but changes later.

- Go Won-hee as Lee Ji-yoon

The daughter of the Jung Family Foods' CEO. She wants to become independent, so runs away from home.

=== Supporting ===
==== People around Kang-soo ====
- Kim Kyung-nam as Sung-jae

Kang-soo's friend who is also a deliveryman.

- Kim Ki-doo as Baek Gong-gi

A martial artist who is a leader of the Holy Noodles deliverymen. He is loyal to Kang-soo.

- Heo Ji-won as Min-chan

He attended a good college but has not gotten a job, she becomes a deliveryman.

- Kang Bong-sung as Byung-soo

A Holy Noodles deliveryman who is on Kang-soo's side.

- Jung Ik-han as Young-taek

A Holy Noodles deliveryman who is caring to his younger sister.

- Kim Min-seok as Ho-young

A deliveryman at Holy Noodles who is loyal to Gong-gi.

- Ye Soo-jung as Jeong-im

The owner of Hanyang Seollongtang, Hyun-soo's grandmother, who is caring to Kang-soo and his friends.

- Yoon Jeong-il as Hyun-soo

Kang-soo's friend that turns out to be Kang-soo's younger brother.

- Lee Yu-ri as Yoon Hwa-young

A web developer who helped Kang-soo.

==== People around Dan-ah ====
- Jo Hee-bong as Jang Dong-soo

The chef and boss in Lively Handmade Noodles. He is a former gang boss.

- Lee Min-young as Soon-ae

Dong-soo's assistant in the noodle house. She is the daughter of a rich man.

- Nam Ji-hyun (Note: Credited as Son Ji-hyun.) as Choi Yeon-ji

Dan-ah's friend and housemate. She works at a karaoke bar.

- Oh Yoon-hong as Lee Dan-ah's mother
- Lee Kyu-sung as Dan-ah's younger brother

==== People around Jin-gyu ====
- Lee Won-jong as Oh Sung-hwan

Jin-kyu's father and the CEO of Ohsung Group.

- Lee Kan-hee as Jung Sook

Jin-kyu's mother.

- Park Joo-hyung as Oh Sung-gyu

Jin-kyu's brother.

==== People around Ji-yoon ====
- Kim Hye-ri as Jung Hye-rin

Ji-yoon's mother and the CEO of Jung Family Foods. She is an antagonist in the series.

- Sunwoo Jae-duk as Lee Jang-jin

Ji-yoon's father.

- Yoo Ji-hyun as Coffee World's manager

==== Extended cast ====
- Lee Hang-na as Hyeon-soo's mother
- N/A as Jong-hyun
- N/A as So-hyun
- Park Sung-joon as Yoon-cheol
- Han Seung-hyun as Team leader
- Lee Myung-hoon as Department Head Park

=== Cameo appearances ===
- Jo Hyun-sik as a postman injured in a traffic accident
- Kim Won-hyo as a hit-and-run driver
- Choi Hong-il as Choi Kang-soo's father

== Production ==
Strongest Deliveryman was produced by Jidam Inc. for KBS. Jidam also produced Jang Bo-ri Is Here!, My Daughter, Geum Sa-wol and Mrs. Cop 2 as well as the KBS daily dramas Ruby Ring and Two Mothers.

Yoon Shi-yoon was offered the lead role, but declined because of a conflict with filming the drama Hit the Top.

Originally, Jang Mi-kwan and Lee Yeol-eum were set to play the second lead characters, Oh Jin-gyu and Lee Ji-yoon, but there was a change in casting and the roles were given to Kim Seon-ho and Go Won-hee. The producer of Strongest Deliveryman explained that Jang Mi-kwan left the cast due to disagreements.

== Soundtrack ==
Strongest Deliveryman Original Soundtrack

Soundtrack album by various artists
- Released: 2017
- Genre: Soundtrack
- Language: Korean
- Label: Sony Music Korea

=== Part 1 ===
No.	Title	Artists	Length
1.	"Must Have"	Jang Jae-in	04:01
2.	"Must Have" (Inst.)		04:01
Total length:			08:02

=== Part 2 ===
No.	Title	Artists	Length
1.	"LaLaLa" (랄랄라)	Go Kyung-pyo	03:05
2.	"LaLaLa" (랄랄라) (Inst.)		03:05
Total length:			06:10

=== Part 3 ===
No.	Title	Artists	Length
1.	"Almost Love" (청춘만화)	VANTA	03:32
2.	"Almost Love" (청춘만화) (Inst.)		03:32
Total length:			07:04

=== Part 4 ===
No.	Title	Artists	Length
1.	"It's Magical"	The Barberettes; Harim	03:23
2.	"It's Magical" (Inst.)		03:23
Total length:			06:46

=== Part 5 ===
No.	Title	Artists	Length
1.	"End of a Day" (하루의 끝)	Na Yoon-kwon	03:55
2.	"End of a Day" (하루의 끝) (Inst.)		03:55
Total length:			07:50

=== Part 6 ===
No.	Title	Artists	Length
1.	"I Need You" (니가 필요해)	Kisum; Kim Chae-won (April)	03:10
2.	"I Need You" (니가 필요해) (Inst.)		03:10
Total length:			06:20

=== Part 7 ===
No.	Title	Artists	Length
1.	"Way to You" (너에게 가는 길)	Chae Soo-bin	03:24
2.	"Way to You" (너에게 가는 길) (Inst.)		03:24
Total length:			06:48

=== Part 8 ===
No.	Title	Artists	Length
1.	"Home"	Sohyang	04:12
2.	"Home" (Inst.)		04:12
Total length:			08:24

=== Part 9 ===
No.	Title	Artists	Length
1.	"Look at Me Now" (나를 봐요)	Merry Round	03:57
2.	"Look at Me Now" (나를 봐요) (Inst.)		03:57
Total length:			07:54

=== Part 10 ===
No.	Title	Artists	Length
1.	"Between You and Me" (너와나 사이로)	Oksu Sajinkwan	04:16
2.	"Between You and Me" (너와나 사이로) (Inst.)		04:16
Total length:			08:32

=== Part 11 ===
No.	Title	Artists	Length
1.	"Can You Hear Me Now"	Shin Jae	03:50
2.	"Can You Hear Me Now" (Inst.)		03:50
Total length:			07:40

=== Part 12 ===
No.	Title	Artists	Length
1.	"My Star" (새별)	Giryeon	03:34
2.	"My Star" (새별) (Inst.)		03:34
Total length:			07:08

== Ratings ==
- In this table, the blue numbers represent the lowest ratings and the red numbers represent the highest ratings.
- NR denotes that the drama did not rank in the top 20 daily programs on that date.

Ep.	Broadcast date	Average audience share			
Ep.	Broadcast date	TNmS		AGB Nielsen	
Ep.	Broadcast date	Nationwide	Seoul	Nationwide	Seoul
1	August 4, 2017	4.1% (NR)	4.9% (NR)	3.5% (NR)	4.3% (NR)
2	August 5, 2017	5.4% (18th)	5.4% (19th)	5.6% (18th)	6.2% (16th)
3	August 11, 2017	4.2% (NR)	4.4% (NR)	4.3% (NR)	4.5% (NR)
4	August 12, 2017	5.5% (19th)	6.2% (NR)	6.5% (18th)	7.3% (13th)
5	August 18, 2017	4.1% (NR)	4.5% (NR)	4.6% (NR)	5.1% (20th)
6	August 19, 2017	6.4% (18th)	6.5% (18th)	6.3% (20th)	6.4% (13th)
7	August 25, 2017	4.2% (NR)	4.4% (NR)	6.2% (18th)	6.5% (16th)
8	August 26, 2017	6.6% (17th)	6.2% (14th)	7.2% (14th)	7.6% (14th)
9	September 1, 2017	3.9% (NR)	4.0% (NR)	5.2% (NR)	5.3% (NR)
10	September 2, 2017	5.9% (20th)	6.2% (17th)	6.5% (19th)	6.6% (11th)
11	September 8, 2017	4.8% (NR)	5.0% (NR)	5.8% (17th)	5.9% (16th)
12	September 9, 2017	5.8% (19th)	5.7% (18th)	6.9% (14th)	6.8% (13th)
13	September 15, 2017	5.0% (NR)	4.7% (NR)	5.4% (20th)	5.8% (19th)
14	September 16, 2017	6.1% (NR)	5.7% (20th)	6.7% (14th)	6.9% (14th)
15	September 22, 2017	4.4% (NR)	4.6% (NR)	5.1% (18th)	5.3% (20th)
16	September 23, 2017	6.7% (16th)	6.4% (15th)	7.7% (10th)	8.0% (7th)
Average		5.2%	5.2%	5.8%	6.2%

== Awards and nominations ==
Year	Award	Category	Nominee	Result
2017	10th Korea Drama Awards	Best New Actress	Go Won-hee	Won
2017	31st KBS Drama Awards	Excellence Award, Actor in a Miniseries	Go Kyung-pyo	Nominated
2017	31st KBS Drama Awards	Excellence Award, Actress in a Miniseries	Chae Soo-bin	Nominated
2017	31st KBS Drama Awards	Best New Actor	Kim Seon-ho	Nominated
2017	31st KBS Drama Awards	Best Supporting Actor	Jo Hee-bong	Nominated
