= Epitone Project =

South Korean indie band

- Origin: South Korea
- Genre: Independent music
- Years active: 2006–present
- Members: Cha Se-jeong

Cha Se-jeong (Korean: 차세정), also known as his one-man band Epitone Project (Korean: 에피톤 프로젝트), is a South Korean composer and singer. As the sole member, he composes and performs his own songs while also collaborating with various vocalists on his albums. The name "Epitone" is derived from a track by Japanese musician Kazuhiko Maeda.

== Early life ==
Although Cha Se-jeong never received formal education in songwriting or composition, he attributes his early training in classical and jazz piano, which began at age six, as the foundation of his musical career. His passion for music was further enriched by his father's extensive collection of over 10,000 LPs at home, exposing him to a diverse array of genres, including classical, pop, Korean pop, and folk, which set his musical tastes apart from those of his peers. Cha recalls being introduced to jazz guitarist Pat Metheny in fifth grade, an experience he credits with broadening his musical perspective. As a child, he enjoyed spending time alone at home, listening to LPs ranging from early albums by Someday and The Beatles to compositions by Beethoven. Over time, he developed particular admiration for artists such as Yoon Sang, Toy, and 015B.

Cha's desire to attend music school was met with his mother's opposition, so he enrolled in sociology instead. However, he was forced to drop out before even completing a semester. After finishing his military service, he felt a void and decided to teach himself composition and MIDI music. He learned computer programs and music theory on his own, with music analysis of Yoon Sang, Toy, and 015B serving as a key part of his studies. To afford the necessary equipment, he entered various music competitions for videos and commercials, diligently analyzing the feedback and results of each, whether he won or not.

== Career ==
=== Beginning ===
Epitone Project is the one-man band of South Korean musician Cha Se-jeong. The project's name is derived from "Epitone," a song by Japanese musician Kazuhiko Maeda that Cha has cited as a significant influence during his youth. He chose the name with the hope of creating music that would similarly resonate with listeners, offering them comfort and hope. Cha began his music career in 2005 when his song "A Conversation Between Two Men and Women," uploaded to an online community, gained public attention. He continued to rise in prominence in 2007 by winning the "Cyworld Stage Best Choice" award.

His first publicly released album, the EP 1229, was released on December 12, 2006. On April 21, 2008, he released the EP At Your Favorite Place, which included the instrumental track "Spring Day, Cherry Blossoms, and You." The song achieved widespread popularity, particularly for use as background music on social media. The album caught the attention of Pastel Music, a mid-sized label near Hongik University, leading to an invitation for a visit in the summer of 2008. This visit resulted in a contract offer. Cha initially believed he was signing a contract to work exclusively as a composer without public appearances, but the terms included a condition for him to release an album as a singer.

=== Work with Pastel Music ===
After signing with Pastel Music, Cha contributed two songs, "Where Are You (feat. Han Hee-jung)" and "That Person Hurts Me (feat. Taru)," to the agency's compilation series, Love's Short Stories Chapter 1 - With Or Without You. The songs gained significant public notice after being featured as background music in the final episode of the MBC drama High Kick Through the Roof.

On February 24, 2009, he released the special album The Beginning of a Long Journey, a compilation of tracks from his previous EPs and singles. This was followed by his first full-length album, The Lost and Found. Both albums became commercially successful, each selling over 20,000 copies, particularly among women in their 20s and 30s. He continued his work with the release of the EP Short Stories 01. Cactus on June 29 of the same year. This album featured a version of the song "Cactus" from his first album, performed with Cha as the vocalist.

His first public performance was as a guest at a Casker concert in May 2009. Despite his severe stage fright, Pastel Music arranged his first solo concert. Cha took on the preparations himself, writing down his entire script and personally overseeing the sound and lighting to manage his anxiety. Following the concert, he reportedly reviewed every fan review.

=== Solo and Collaborative Work ===
Cha continued to make occasional media appearances and later collaborated with Sim Gyu-sun, a guest vocalist from his first album. After releasing three preview singles, they released the joint album A Room of One's Own on September 7, 2011. Cha composed and arranged several songs on the album and performed a duet with Sim Gyu-sun on the final track, "Laughter."

His second full-length album, A Day in a Strange City, was released on June 7, 2012. The album was inspired by his travels to Eastern Europe following the stressful production of his previous album. With the exception of one duet with Han Hee-jung, Cha performed all the vocals himself. Although the agency was initially skeptical, the album received a positive critical reception and is considered by some to be Epitone Project's most highly regarded work. A fire at his studio briefly threatened the album's release, but he was able to recover his work, and the album's title track, "At Dawn," subsequently topped music charts.

=== Later career ===
In 2014, Cha announced his third album, Each Person's Night, would be released that spring. However, following the Sewol Ferry tragedy, the album's release and concert schedule were postponed until September. The album was released on September 16, 2014. Cha described the album as a deliberate attempt to break from his established musical style. This is most evident in the initial tracks, which mark a distinct stylistic departure, while the later tracks maintain his previous sound.

Until this period, Cha had been reluctant to appear in media, citing a lack of conversational skills and his focus on music production. The agency encouraged him to take on more public responsibility, and he made his debut on terrestrial television on the November 1, 2014, episode of Yu Huiyeol's Sketchbook. During his appearance, he demonstrated a self-deprecating humor by forgetting the lyrics to his own songs when asked to perform a short live set.

On December 16, 2014, he participated as a producer on the Pastel Music compilation album Fragment of Love Chapter 5 - The Letter From Nowhere, alongside Zitten and Casker's Lee Jun-oh.

He also released one of his own songs on the album. On February 25, 2015, he reunited with Sim Gyu-sun to record the duet "Maybe, Somehow" for the OST of the drama Hyde, Jekyll, Me.

He continued to meet fans through festival performances and his 2015 concert series, Passive, Small Theater, Rainy Season, and his 2016 national tour, Early, Spring. Following this, he went on a hiatus, moving to London for several months in 2016 to seek new creative inspiration.

=== Essay publication ===
Epitone Project's 2018 fourth full-length album, Words in My Heart, was released alongside an essay collection of the same name on October 4, 2018. The album features 11 tracks, including "First Love," "Blue Day," and "Downpour," while the accompanying book shares his perspectives on daily life and his time in London. The album received significant attention, partly due to the music video for the title track, which featured actress Bae Suzy and Nam Yoon-su. The album's release concerts, held from December 14–16, experienced high demand for tickets. During these concerts and his October 24 appearance on Yu Huiyeol's Sketchbook, Cha was noted for displaying a significant increase in self-confidence.

== Discography ==
=== Studio albums ===
Title	Album details	Peak chart positions	Ref
Title	Album details	KOR	Ref
Lost and Found (유실물 보관소)	Released: 2010; Label: Danal Entertainment; Formats: digital download, streaming; Track listing: 1. "The Lost and Found" (유실물 보관소); 2. "Sparkling" (반짝반짝 빛나는), Song by Jo Yae Jin of Lucite Tokki; 3. "A sigh has grown" (한숨이 늘었어), duet with Lee Jin Woo; 4. "Cactus" (선인장), Song by Sim Gyu Sun; 5. "Narrow Gate" (좁은 문); 6. "Ihwadong" (이화동), duet with Han Hee Jung; 7. "Fever reducer" (해열제), Song by Sammi; 8. "Time" (시간); 9. "Handwritten letter" (손편지); 10. "Opening a drawer" (서랍을 열다); 11. "Today" (오늘); 12. "Spring's Melody" (봄의 멜로디), Song by Sim Gyu Sun; 13. "Canola flower" (유채꽃)	—	
A Day in a Strange City (낯선 도시에서의 하루)	Released: 2012; Label: Danal Entertainment		
Each Night	2014		
Words in My Heart	2018; Kakao Entertainment)		

=== Extended plays ===
Title	EP details	Peak chart positions	Sales
Title	EP details	KOR	Sales
1229	Released: 2006; Label: Danal Entertainment; Formats: CD, digital download	—	
At Your Favorite Place	Released: 2008; Label: Danal Entertainment; Formats: CD, digital download	—	
The Beginning of a Long Journey	Released: 2009; Label: Pastel Music, Danal Entertainment; Formats: CD, digital download	—	
Short Stories.1 Cactus	Released: 2010; Label: Magic Strawberry Sound; Formats: CD, digital download	—	
"—" denotes a recording that did not chart.

=== Singles ===
Title	Year	Peak chart positions	Sales	Album
Title	Year	KOR	Sales	Album
바이올렛	2008	—		Love's Short Stories Chapter 1 - With Or Without You (2008, Brownie Entertainment)
나는 그 사람이 아프다 (feat. Taru)	2008	—		Love's Short Stories Chapter 1 - With Or Without You (2008, Brownie Entertainment)
희망고문 (instrumental)	2008	—		Love's Short Stories Chapter 1 - With Or Without You (2008, Brownie Entertainment)
그대는 어디에 (feat. Han Hee Jung)	2009	—		사랑의 단상 Chapter 2 : This Is Not A Love Song
고백 (feat. 이진우, 조예진 From 루싸이트 토끼)	2009			Our Story That Will Never End (Hommage To Moonrise, Pastelmusic Presents) (2009, Brownie Entertainment)
기도 (duet with 이진우)	2009			Our Story That Will Never End (Hommage To Moonrise, Pastelmusic Presents) (2009, Brownie Entertainment)
나는 그 사람이 아프다. (오스트레일리아 울룰루 '세상의 중심에서 사랑을 외치다' - 그 밤 나는 별의 잔해였다)	2010	—		A Thousand Days of Dreams - Lee Dong-jin's Travels, Films, and Music
그녀(Her)	2014	—		사랑의 단상 Chapter 5 : The Letter From Nowhere

=== Songwriting credits ===
The following credits are adapted from the Korea Music Copyright Association database, unless indicated otherwise.

Songs produced by Epitone Project for other artists
Title	Year	Artist	Album	Lyrics		Music		Arrangement	
Title	Year	Artist	Album	Credited	With	Credited	With	Credited	With
	2011	Shim Gyu-seon	A Room of One's Own	Yes	—N/a	Yes	—N/a	Yes	—N/a
	2010	Fanny Fink	7 Moments (세상의 어쩔 수 없는 일곱가지)	Yes	—N/a	Yes	—N/a	Yes	—N/a
"Intro"	2012	Lee Seung-gi	Forest	Yes	—N/a	Yes	—N/a	Yes	—N/a
"Return"(되돌리다; Doedollida)	2012	Lee Seung-gi	Forest	Yes	—N/a	Yes	—N/a	Yes	—N/a
"Forest" (숲; Sup)	2012	Lee Seung-gi	Forest	Yes	—N/a	Yes	—N/a	Yes	—N/a
"Words of Love" (사랑한다는 말; Saranghandaneun Mal)	2012	Lee Seung-gi	Forest	—N/a	—N/a	Yes	—N/a	Yes	—N/a
"Invite" (나에게 초대; Naege Chodae)	2012	Lee Seung-gi	Forest	Yes	—N/a	Yes	—N/a	Yes	—N/a
"Little Wildflower" (꽃마리)	2020	Bae Suzy	Yes? No?	Yes	—N/a	Yes	—N/a	Yes	—N/a

=== Soundtrack appearances ===
Title	Year	Peak chart positions	Sales	Album
Title	Year	KOR	Sales	Album
"Maybe" (어쩌면 어쩐지)	2012	—		Hyde Jekyll, Me OST Part 6

== Bibliography ==
- Cha, Se-jeong. A Little Closer to You. Bookcloud. October 10, 2012. ISBN 978-89-93357-88-2.
