= Jeon Seong-hwan =

South Korean actor (1940–2025)

Jeon Seong-hwan (Korean: 전성환; 1940 – 31 August 2025) was a South Korean actor.

== Life and career ==
Jeon Seong-hwan was born in 1940. He appeared in a number of feature films and Korean dramas including Taewangsashingi (2007), East of Eden (2008), Deep Rooted Tree (2011) and KBS Drama Special (2011).

In 1989, he was awarded both the Korean Theater Arts Award and the Busan City Culture Award.

Jeon died on 31 August 2025.
