= Aurora (Bada album) =

Studio album by Bada
- Released: September 27, 2004
- Genres: Ballad; R&B; dance
- Language: Korean
- Label: Woongjin Entertainment

Bada chronology
A Day of Renew (2003)	Aurora (2004)	Made in Sea (2006)

Singles from Aurora
- 1. "Aurora" Released: September 24, 2004; 2. "Eyes" Released: September 29, 2004

Aurora is the second studio album released by South Korean singer Bada in September 2004. Although her image concept did not change from her first album, which was successful, Aurora failed to sell well. Lead single "Aurora", which was a love ballad, also fared poorly, leading Bada to switch singles quickly. The second single was "Eyes", which in contrast was a R&B-dance track. Sales of the album were around 23,000, about 100,000 less copies than what A Day of Renew sold.

== Track listing ==
1. Happy Face
2. Aurora
3. Eyes
4. Interlude
5. Go By
6. Good Luck
7. Into You (feat. Hi-D)
8. Thank You
9. Sweet Potato
10. Dreaming
11. Higher
12. Blue Juice
13. Little Boy
