= See the Sea (album) =

Studio album by Bada
- Released: August 6, 2009 (digital)
- Genre: K-pop, dance
- Language: Korean
- Label: Bymin Entertainment

Bada chronology
Made in Sea (2006)	See the Sea (2009)

Singles from See the sea
- 1. "MAD" Released: August 6, 2009; 2. "Yes I'm in Love" Released: October 9, 2009

See the Sea (Korean: 바다를 바라보다) is the fourth studio album by the South Korean singer Bada. It was released on August 6, 2009 and peaked on the MNet album chart at no. 9.

== Track listing ==
No.	Title	Length
1.	"바다를 바라보다 (See the Sea) (Intro)"
2.	"Yes I'm in Love" (featuring Ok Taecyeon (택연))
3.	"MAD" (featuring Untouchable (언터쳐블))
4.	"여자는 울고 (Women Shed Tears)"
5.	"Dilemma"
6.	"Dance Mission"
7.	"오후의 산책 (Afternoon Walk (Silky Love))"
8.	"Honey Honey"
9.	"Generation Next"
10.	"웃어라, 캔디야 (Smiley Candy (You Know))"
11.	"Reach Out"
12.	"Mad" (Special Rap Version)
13.	"I..." (duet with Eugene (유진))
