= Bada (singer) =

South Korean singer (born 1980)

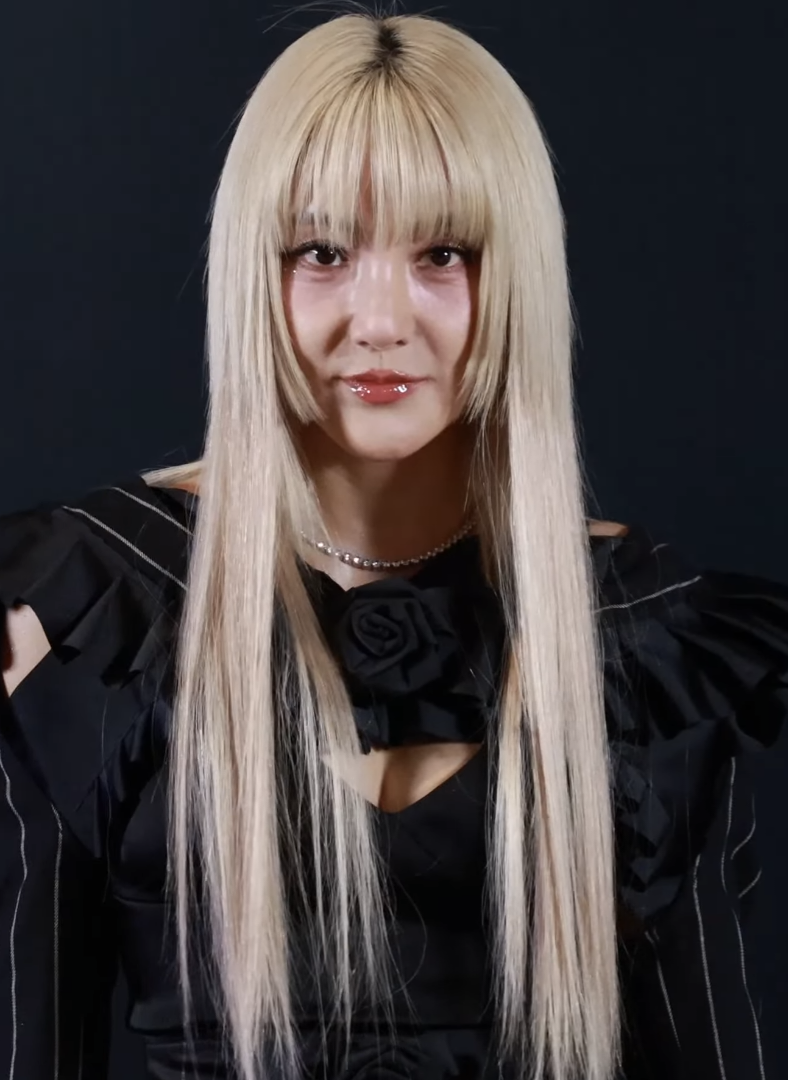
- Bada in March 2024
- Born: Choi Sung-hee; February 28, 1980 (age 46); Bucheon, South Korea
- Other name: Sea
- Education: Dankook University
- Occupations: Singer-songwriter; composer; actress; television presenter
- Agent: WaveNine
- Spouse: Unnamed (m. 2017)
- Children: 1
- Musical career
- Genres: K-pop; R&B
- Instruments: Vocals; keyboard
- Years active: 1997–present
- Labels: SM; Wave Nine
- Formerly of: S.E.S.; SM Town
- Website: wavenine.net

Korean name
- Hangul: 최성희
- Hanja: 崔盛希
- RR: Choe Seonghui
- MR: Ch'oe Sŏnghŭi

Stage name
- Hangul: 바다
- RR: Bada
- MR: Pada

Choi Sung-hee (Korean: 최성희; born February 28, 1980), known professionally as Bada (바다) (also known as Sea), is a South Korean singer-songwriter, composer, musical actress and television presenter. She debuted as a member of the South Korean girl group S.E.S. in 1997, which went on to become one of the best-selling artists in South Korea. After S.E.S. disbanded in December 2002, she released her first solo studio album, A Day of Renew, in October 2003. Since then, she continued her active singing career with songs such as Aurora, Eyes, V.I.P, GoGoGo, Queen, and Mad.

Apart from recording and performing songs, she has established herself as an actress, notably through her participation in the original and Korean versions of stage musicals including Notre-Dame de Paris, 200 Pounds Beauty, Legally Blonde, and Mozart!. She won Best Actress at the third Musical Awards and has starred in ten musicals to date.

== Early life ==
Choi Sung-hee, born on February 28, 1980, is the daughter of Choi Sae-wol, a trot singer with a background in Korean pansori. Her childhood was marked by financial struggles, particularly after her father's illness. For nine years until her debut, she resided in a container home provided by a local church. In lectures aimed at youth, she has shared her humble beginnings and encouraged students not to let their backgrounds hinder their pursuit of dreams.

Bada was scouted by Lee Soo-man and entered SM Entertainment. She debuted as the leader and main vocal of S.E.S., the first successful female K-pop idol group.

Bada studied theater at Dankook University.

== Career ==
=== 1997–2002: Career with S.E.S. ===
Bada made her debut with S.E.S. in 1997. The group released their debut album I'm Your Girl on November 1, 1997. The group later became the top-selling K-pop girl group. Since their debut, the group has released five Korean albums, two Japanese albums as well as a Japanese compilation album. The group released a Korean compilation album, Friend before breaking up at the end of 2002. Members Bada and Eugene parted ways from SM Entertainment, while Shoo stayed with SM Entertainment until 2006.

=== 2003–2008: A Day of Renew, Aurora, Made in Sea and Musical acting ===
Bada signed an exclusive contract with WoongJin entertainment. In 2003, Bada released her debut solo album A Day of Renew that has sold approximately 130,000 records, according to the Music Industry Association of Korea. Bada became the first Korean idol singer to venture onto the musical stage in 2003 with the musical Peppermint, a love story about a singer named Bada. It was written for her by creator and producer Lee Yu-ri, who is also responsible for other musical projects such as Typhoon, Mother and Winter Sonata. In 2004, her second album Aurora was released and has sold approximately 23,000 copies.

In 2006, her third album, Made in Sea, was a big success. In 2007, Bada was cast in the role of Denise in the Korean version of Andrew Lloyd Webber's Tell Me on a Sunday. Right afterward, she took on the role of Esmeralda as a part of the original Korean cast of Notre-Dame de Paris. Her widely praised portrayal of Esmeralda gained her acceptance as a musical actress and won her the Best Newcomer Actress award and others at The Musical Awards and the Korea Musical Daesangs in 2008; she reprised the role in 2009.

=== 2009–2013: See the Sea and Musical acting ===
In 2009, Bada released her fourth album called See the Sea which featured both Korean rap group Untouchable and 2PM's Ok Taec-yeon. The following year, 200 Pounds Beauty, a musical based on the popular movie of the same name, cast Bada in the titular role of Kang Han-byul, an overweight ghost singer who aspires to become a star and undergoes extensive plastic surgery. Bada's turn as Kang earned her the Best Actress honor at the third The Musical Awards. She was recast in 2011 for the project.

In 2010, Bada played Peggy Sawyer in Broadway on 42nd Street

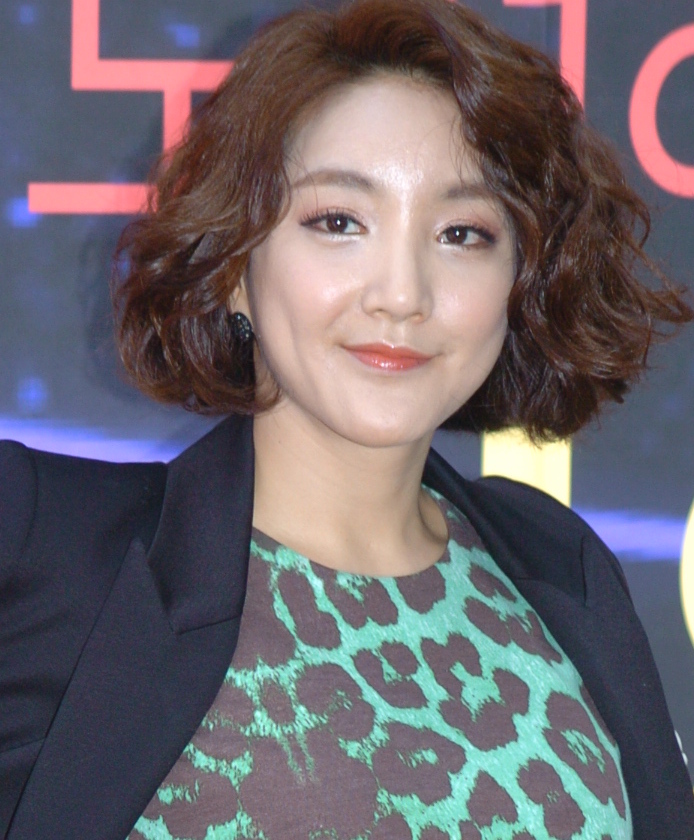
Bada in 2012

In 2012, she briefly took on the role of Mozart's wife, Constanze, in Mozart!,

In June 2013, she was cast as Elle Woods in Legally Blonde. During Legally Blonde, her mother died. Despite the loss, Bada continued performances for the musical until its final run and famously sang Secret Garden's "You Raise Me Up" on KBS's Open Music Concert just two days after her mother's death. She has since stated that this loss was the reason for her relative inactivity in both her music and musical career from 2011 to mid-2013. She also cast as Marguerite in the first Korean adaptation of Frank Wildhorn's The Scarlet Pimpernel. That same year, Bada appeared as a vocalist for the song "City Life" on American musician Brian Transeau's album A Song Across Wires.

She returned as Esmeralda in the 2013 production of Notre-Dame de Paris. She then signed on to depict Carmen in the first Korean production of the musical Carmen.

=== 2016–2017: 20th anniversary debut project ===
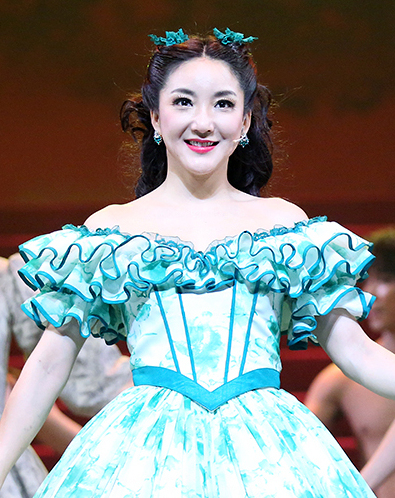
Bada in 2015

On May 28, Bada, along with S.E.S. members Eugene and Shoo, attended a charity event, Green Heart Bazaar. Bada released a special album titled Flower on June 13, 2016, to celebrate her 20th debut anniversary. The album contains four tracks with lead single "Flower" featuring popular rapper Kanto. She released double music video for "Flower" on June 13 and "Amazing" on June 15. A few weeks later, Bada released a special summer album titled Summertime on June 26. Bada later released collaboration single "Cosmic" with Super Junior's Ryeowook on September 22, as a part of SM Entertainment project SM Station.

In October 2016, Bada, along with Eugene and Shoo re-formed S.E.S. to celebrate their 20 years debut. They started their project of the 20th anniversary debut with released digital single "Love[Story]", a remake of their 1999 single "Love", through SM Entertainment's digital project SM Station on November 28 and its music video released on December 29.

In early December 2016, they aired their ten episode reality show Remember, I'm Your S.E.S., which broadcast through mobile app Oksusu. To accompany their 20th anniversary debut, they held a concert Remember, the Day, on December 30 and 31 at Sejong University's Daeyang Hall in Seoul.

On January 2, the special album of their 20th anniversary debut Remember was released. The album consists of double lead singles. "Remember" was digitally released on January 1 and "Paradise" was released along with the album on January 2. They held a fanmeet as their last project of their 20th anniversary debut called I Will Be There, Waiting for You on March 1, 2017.

In July 2017, she became the vocal mentor for survival show Idol School.

Bada successfully held her solo concert for the 20th anniversary debut, Twenty Steps, on December 31, 2017, at the grand hall of Unjeong Green Campus at Sungshin Women's University.

=== 2019–2020: Off The Record ===
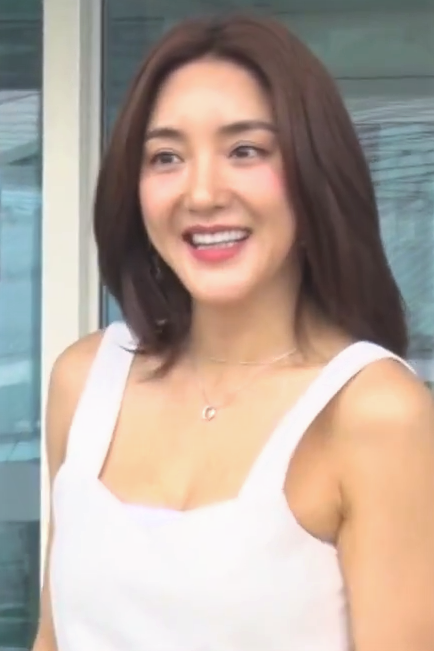
Bada in 2018

On October 14, 2019, Wave Nine announced Bada's comeback with a single title "Off The Record", which released on October 24.

On April 19, 2020, Bada teamed up with 33 singers to release a remake song of Yang Hee-eun's "Evergreen" for the medical professionals around the world fighting COVID-19 and also to mark the 60th anniversary of the April 19 Revolution.

=== 2022–present: Singles ===
On August 11, 2022, after 3 years of break, Bada released her comeback single titled "localized heavy rain", her second single under Wavenine Entertainment.

On December 22, 2023, Bada released her christmas single "Not for sale this christmas". The song featured vocals from fellow S.E.S member Eugene.

On April 25, 2024, Bada released her single titled "Ping @.@", featuring Truedy. Later that year, on December 2, 2024, Bada released the single "Let Me Be the Sea", a song about gratitude, peace, and prayer.

On August 25, 2025, Bada came out with another single named "Love wave" and just after 5 months of its release, Bada then again released a winter balled titled "Our Loud Goodbye" on January 7, 2026, which was praised for her strong vocals.

== Personal life ==
On January 13, 2017, her agency confirmed that she would marry a franchise restaurant owner eleven years her junior. Her wedding was held in Seoul on March 23, 2017. On August 30, 2020, Bada posted a letter on her fancafe announcing her pregnancy. On September 7, 2020, she gave birth to her first child, a daughter.

== Discography ==
=== Albums ===
- A Day of Renew (2003)
- Aurora (2004)
- Made in Sea (2006)
- See the Sea (2009)

=== Special albums ===
- Flower (2016)
- Summertime (2016)

=== Singles ===
Title	Year	Peak chart positions	Sales	Album
Title	Year	KOR Gaon	Sales	Album
As lead artist
"Music"	2003	x	—N/a	A Day of Renew
"Aurora"	2004	x	—N/a	Aurora
"Eyes"	2004	x	—N/a	Aurora
"Find the Way"	2006	x	—N/a	Made in Sea
"Start"	2006	x	—N/a	Non album-single
"Mad"	2009	x	—N/a	See the Sea
"Yes I'm in Love"	2009	x	—N/a	See the Sea
"With Me"	2011	—	—N/a	Non album-singles
"Precious"	2014	—	—N/a	Non album-singles
"Flower"	2016	—	—N/a	Flower
"Summertime"	2016	—	—N/a	Non album-singles
"Off the Record"	2019	—	—N/a	Non album-singles
"The Blue Night of Jeju Island" (제주도의 푸른밤)	2021	—	—N/a	Non album-singles
"Local Rain" (국지성 호우)	2022	—	—N/a	Non album-singles
"Not For Sale This Christmas"	2023	—	—N/a	Non album-singles
"Ping@.@"	2024	—	—N/a	Non album-singles
"Let Me Be the Sea"	2024	—	—N/a	Non album-singles
"Love Wave"	2025	—	—N/a	Non album-singles
"Our Loud Goodbye"	2026	—	—N/a	Non album-singles
Collaboration
"Cosmic" (with Ryeowook)	2016	—	—N/a	SM Station Season 1
"Sangnoksu 2020" (상록수 2020) (with various artists)	2020	—	—N/a	Non album-single
As featured artist
"Like You" (Rain feat. Bada)	2002	x	—N/a	Bad Guy
"Dream" (Dynamic Duo feat. Bada)	2007	x	—N/a	Enlightened
"Think About' Chu" (Windy City feat. Bada)	2008	x	—N/a	Think About' Chu
"A Song Only I Can Sing" (Seo Hae-An feat. Bada)	2011	—	—N/a	Infinite Challenge's "Seo Hae-An Highway Music Festival"
"City Life" (BT & Fractal feat. Bada)	2013	—	—N/a	A Song Across Wires
"Candy" (ZoPD feat. Bada)	2015	—	—N/a	Golden Goose Part. 1
"I Go Party" (Greg feat. Bada)	2024	—	—N/a	Non album-singles
"Seashells" (YounJoo Sim feat. Bada)	2024	—	—N/a	Non album-singles
Soundtrack appearances
"One Day Passes"	2004	x	—N/a	I'm Sorry, I Love You soundtrack
"Rainbow"	2006	x	—N/a	Spring Waltz O.S.T. soundtrack
"Start Again"	2006	x	—N/a	Famous 'Seven' Princess soundtrack
"?"	2009	x	—N/a	Notre Dame de Paris musical soundtrack
"Only One"	2010	—	—N/a	Bread, Love and Dreams soundtrack
"Sweet My Love"	2011	—	—N/a	A Thousand Kisses soundtrack
"It's Hurt and Hurt"	2012	—	—N/a	Glass Mask soundtrack
"Stay"	2013	—	—N/a	Goddess of Marriage soundtrack
"If I Could"	2013	—	—N/a	Carmen musical soundtrack
"That You Loved Me" (사랑했다고)	2017	—	—N/a	Witch at Court soundtrack
"I'm in Love" (그대로 채워가요)	2020	—	—N/a	Homemade Love Story soundtrack
"—" denotes releases that did not chart or were not released in that region.

=== Participation in albums ===
Title	Year	Peak chart positions	Album
Title	Year	KOR Gaon	Album
"Nae Bah Reul Si Ki Shin Jesus" (내 발을 씻기신 예수)	2001	x	The Gift
"The Lord's Prayer" (주기도문)	2002	x	2002 Winter Vacation in SMTown.com – My Angel My Light
"Merry Christmas! I Love You"	2004	x	2004 Christmas Story
"My Love.."	2004	x	Miracle Vol. 2
"You Were Born To Be Loved" (당신은 사랑 받기 위해 태어난 사람)	2004	x	Miracle Vol. 2
"Hanaui Mogsoli, Hanaui Sumgyeol" (하나의 목소리, 하나의 숨결) (with Shin Hae-chul)	2006	x	Go For The Final
"Kkoch Ma-eum Byeol Ma-eum" (꽃 마음 별 마음)	2007	x	je7hoe PBC Changjagsaenghwalseong-gaje (제7회 PBC 창작생활성가제)
"Salanghandaneun Mal-eun" (사랑한다는 말은)	2009	x	Saengmyeong, Salanghae Gieoghae (생명, 사랑해 기억해)
"All I Know is Love" (사랑밖에 난 몰라)	2013	—	Immortal Songs 2: Sim Soo-bong
"Old Love" (옛사랑)	2013	—	Immortal Songs 2: Lee Moon-sae
"Girls' Generation" (소녀시대)	2013	—	Immortal Songs 2: Lee Seung-chul
"For 500 Years" (한 오백년)	2013	—	Immortal Songs 2: Second Anniversary Special
"My Old Story" (나의 옛날 이야기)	2013	—	Immortal Songs 2: Jo Duk-bae
"Unsuccessful Love" (사랑의 불시착)	2013	—	Immortal Songs 2: Park Nam-jung
"Compass" (나침반)	2013	—	Immortal Songs 2: Seol Woon-do
"Run to You"	2013	—	Immortal Songs 2: DJ DOC
"Song of Katusa" (떠날 때는 말없이)	2013	—	Immortal Songs 2: Yoo Ho
"Sorrow" (애상) (with Oh Na-mi)	2013	—	Immortal Songs 2: COOL
"It's Been a While" (한동안 뜸했었지)	2013	—	Immortal Songs 2: Love & Peace
"In Praise of Death" (사의 찬미)	2013	—	Immortal Songs 2: The Legend 7
"Spark" (불티)	2013	—	Immortal Songs 2: Jeon Young-rok
"Why Do You" ( 너는 왜) (with Shin Chul)	2013	—	Immortal Songs 2: Heartthrobs Special
"Beyond (In Game Ver.)"	2013	—	TalesWeaver 10th Anniversary Collection Album
"The Image of You Letting Me Leave with a Smile" (미소를 띄우며 나를 보낸 그 모습처럼)	2014	—	Immortal Songs 2: The Rivals
"Come Back to Busan Port" (돌아와요 부산항에)	2014	—	Immortal Songs 2: Hometown Special
"Circling Around" (빙글빙글)	2014	—	Immortal Songs 2: Park Geon-ho
"I'll Give You the Love Left in Me" (내게 남은 사랑을 드릴께요) (with Kim Jun-ho)	2014	—	Immortal Songs 2: Actor Special
"I Always Miss You" (나 항상 그대를)	2014	—	Immortal Songs 2: Lee Sun-hee
"Unbloomed Flower" (못다핀 꽃 한송이)	2014	—	Immortal Songs 2: 3rd Anniversary Special
"To Heaven"	2014	—	Immortal Songs 2: Lee Gyeong-seop
"Cup of Coffee" (커피 한 잔)	2014	—	Immortal Songs 2: Original Girl Groups Special
"I See It" (보이네)	2014	—	Immortal Songs 2: Saturday NightHeat
"When Time Passes" (세월이 가면)	2014	—	Immortal Songs 2: Autumn Special
"The Dance in Rhythm" (리듬 속에 그 춤을)	2015	—	Immortal Songs 2: Seven Divas Special
"Rose of Betrayal" (배반의 장미)	2015	—	Immortal Songs 2: Joo Young-hoon
"The Truth About Love" (사랑의 진실) (with Yoon Hyung-Ryul)	2015	—	Immortal Songs 2: Kim Jung-ho
"Growl" (으르렁) (as My Love is My Bride)	2016	—	King of Mask Singer Episode 62
"Dream" (꿈)	2018	—	Immortal Songs 2: Cho Yong-pil
"Let's Go Down" (수궁가_내려가보세)	2022	—	Evolution
"I'll call you" (그대를 부를게요)	2022	—	Oh My Wedding OST Part.2
"In Summer" (여름 안에서)	2022	—	[Vol.142] Yoo Hee-yeol's Sketchbook With you: 93rd voice 'Yusuke'
"Blue Rain"	2022	—	[Vol.143] Yoo Hee-yeol's Sketchbook With you: 93rd voice 'Yusuke'
"Foolish Love" (미련한 사랑)	2022	—	Immortal Song - Drama OST - Vocal Queen Special
"Amor Fati" (아모르 파티)	2023	—	Immortal Songs - Artist Yeonja Kim
"You Are a Rose" (그대 모습은 장미)	2023	—	Immortal Song - Edited by the late lyricist Park Geon-ho
"—" denotes releases that did not chart or were not released in that region.

== Concerts ==
- Showman aLIVE (2006)
- Varacon (2009)
- Varacon Encore Concert (2010)
- Varacon X-MAS Special (2010)
- Alive Show Vol.1 (2014)

== Filmography ==
=== Film ===
Year	Title	Role	Notes	Ref.
2022	The Worst Imagination		Shorts Film	

=== Television ===
Year	Title	Notes
2006	X-Man	21 May 2006; 26 Nov 2006
2009–2012	Infinite Challenge	31 October 2009; 30 January 2010; 30 April 2011; 7 May 2011; 11 June 2011; 18 June 2011; 25 June 2011; 2 July 2011; 7 January 2012
2012	Golden Fishery Radio Star	14 June 2012
2012	Saturday Night Live Korea	7 July 2012
2013	Adrenaline 2	16 April 2013
2013	All the K-pop	16 April 2013, 23 April 2013
2013	QTV's Handsome Boys of the 20th Century	11 June 2013
2013	My One Fantasy	10 July 2013
2013	Immortal Songs 2	20 April 2013; 4 May 2013; 1 June 2013 - won 8 June 2013; 15 June 2013 - won 22 June 2013; 6 July 2013; 13 July 2013; 27 July 2013 - won 3 August 2013; 10 August 2013; 24 August 2013; 31 August 2013 - won 7 September 2013
2016	King of Mask Singer	May 29, 2016; June 5, 2016
2016	My Little Television	July 23, 2016; July 30, 2016
2016	Running Man	August 14, 2016 - won
2017	Happy Together	June 22, 2017
2017	Idol School	Regular, Vocal Coach
2021	The Penthouse 2: War in Life	Park Young-ran Cameo
2021	Goal Girl	Cast Member Season 2
2022	Artistock Game	User agent

=== Musicals ===
Year	Musical	Role
2003	The Peppermint	Bada
2007	Tell Me on a Sunday	Denise
2007, 2009, 2013	Notre-Dame de Paris	Esmeralda
2008, 2011	200 Pounds Beauty	Kang Hanbyul
2010	Broadway on 42nd Street	Peggy Sawyer
2010	Legally Blonde	Elle Woods
2012	Mozart!	Constanze
2013	The Scarlet Pimpernel	Marguerite
2013	Carmen	Carmen
2014, 2018	Gone with the Wind	Scarlett O'Hara

== Awards ==
- 21st Korean Best Dresser Award – Female Artist (2004)
- Mnet KM Music Video Festival – PD Special Award (2005)
- 13th Korean Arts Awards – Female Dance Artist (2006)
- 4th Korean Fashion World Awards – Best Dressed Artist (2006)
- Korean Model Awards – Popular Artist (2007)
- 2nd The Musical Awards – Popular Female Actress (2008)
- 14th Korea Musical Daesang – Popular Star (2008)
- 14th Korea Musical Daesang – Best Newcomer Actress (2008)
- 3rd The Musical Awards – Best Actress (2009)
- 15th Korea Musical Daesang – Popular Star (2009)

== Honorary ambassador ==
- Yeosu Expo Sea Love (2007)
- City of Seoul (2008)
- We Start Recreation Headquarters (2008)
- Catholic Life Committee (2009)
- 3rd The Musical Awards (2009)
- Tour de Korea (2013)
