= The Package (TV series) =

2017 South Korean television series

- Promotional poster
- Hangul: 더 패키지
- RR: Deo paekiji
- MR: Tŏ p'aek'iji
- Genre: Drama
- Created by: JTBC
- Written by: Chun Sung-il
- Directed by: Jeon Chang-geun; Kim Jin-won
- Starring: Lee Yeon-hee; Jung Yong-hwa; Choi Woo-shik; Yoon Park; Ryu Seung-soo
- Composer: Kang Dong-yoon
- Country of origin: South Korea
- Original language: Korean
- No. of episodes: 12

Production
- Executive producers: Hahm Young-hoon; Park Joon-seo; Pyo Jong-rok
- Producers: Kang Ra-young; Park Woo-ram; Woo Sang-hee
- Production locations: Seoul, South Korea; Paris, France
- Running time: 60 mins
- Production companies: JYP Pictures; Drama House; The Package SPC

Original release
- Network: JTBC
- Release: October 13 – November 18, 2017

The Package (Korean: 더 패키지) is 2017 South Korean television drama starring Lee Yeon-hee, Jung Yong-hwa, Choi Woo-shik, and Yoon Park. It aired in both South Korea and China. In South Korea, it aired on JTBC every Friday and Saturday at the 23:00 (KST) from October 13, 2017.

== Synopsis ==
Yoon So-so (Lee Yeon-hee) works as a travel guide in France. She leads a group of tourists on a package tour. The travelers all have their own stories. San Ma-roo (Jung Yong-hwa) joined the tour after being dumped by his girlfriend. Kim Gyung-jae (Choi Woo-shik) has been dating for the past 7 years. A mysterious man (Yoon Park) seems to follow Yoon So-so. Jung Yeon-sung (Ryu Seung-soo) joined the package tour with a partner, but he will not reveal what kind of relationship they are in. Han So-ran (Ha Shi-eun) is a web designer and agonizes over staying single or marriage. Oh Gab-soo (Jung Kyoo-soo) is extremely stubborn. Han Book-ja (Lee Ji-hyun) spent most of her life taking care of her husband. Jung Na-hyun (Park Yoo-na) is a woman whom other people cannot guess her age. They all do not want to become involved in each other's personal lives, but, while they travel together, they become closer and develop relationships.

== Cast ==
=== Main ===
- Lee Yeon-hee as Yoon So-so

A tour guide of group of people.

- Jung Yong-hwa as San Ma-roo

A man who got betrayed by his girlfriend and goes on a trip by himself.

=== Supporting ===
==== Tourists ====
- Choi Woo-shik as Kim Gyung-jae

An office worker who has dated his girlfriend for 7 years.

- Ha Shi-eun as Han So-ran

Gyung-jae's girlfriend, a web designer who is contemplating between dating and marriage.

- Ryu Seung-soo as Jung Yeon-sung

A man whose relationship to his partner is a mystery.

- Park Yoo-na as Jung Na-hyun

Yeon-sung's daughter, whose age can't be guessed.

- Jung Kyoo-soo as Oh Gab-soo

A stubborn old man who always picks fights.

- Lee Ji-hyun as Han Book-ja

Gab-soo's wife, a woman who cared for her husband her whole life until she got sick.

- Yoon Park as Yoon Soo-soo

So-so's younger brother, who chases after her.

=== Others ===
- Jang Seung-jo as Bae Hyeong-goo, Yoon So-so's ex-husband.
- Park Joo-hyung as Kim Tae-young
- Chae So-young as Oh Ye-bi, San Ma-roo's girlfriend.
- Kim Min-sang as Department Head
- Kim Neul-me
- Jung Hee-tae as San Ma-roo's colleague.
- Yang Dae-hyuk as Staff, Lohas Finance Education Center
- Kang Bong-sung as Byung-se
- Hwang Young-hee as Yoon So-so's mother
- Lee Han-wi as Yoon So-so's father
- Jang Hee-ryung as Han Doo-ri, Su-su's fiancée
- Min Bok-gi as Doo-ri's father
- Kim Young-sun as Doo-ri's mother

=== Special appearances ===
- Sung Dong-il as So-so's boss
- Lee Young-ja as Woman in the airport (ep. 1)
- Lee Seung-joon as Doctor (ep. 3)

== Production ==
- The Package was the first pre-produced drama by JYP Pictures.
- Filming took place on August 13, 2016 in Seoul, South Korea, then moved to Paris, Rennes, Saint-Malo, Mont Saint-Michel (France) from September 5 to October 26, 2016. It ended in early December 2016.

== Original soundtrack ==
The Package OST Album

Soundtrack album by Various Artists
- Recorded: 2017
- Genre: Soundtrack
- Languages: Korean, English
- Labels: NHN Bugs; OU Entertainment

=== Part 1 ===
No.	Title	Lyrics	Music	Artists	Length
1.	"You Are My Baby"	Heo Sung-jin; Kaemi; Chang-jo	Heo Sung-jin; Ha Hyung-joo; Hong Sung-joon	B1A4	3:08
2.	"You Are My Baby" (Inst.)		Heo Sung-jin; Ha Hyung-joo; Hong Sung-joon		3:08
Total length:					6:16

=== Part 2 ===
No.	Title	Lyrics	Music	Artists	Length
1.	"Unreal"	Seo Jae-ha; Kim Young-sung; ZigZagNote	Seo Jae-ha; Kim Young-sung; ZigZagNote	The Ade	4:01
2.	"Unreal" (Inst.)		Seo Jae-ha; Kim Young-sung; ZigZagNote		4:01
Total length:					8:02

=== Part 3 ===
No.	Title	Lyrics	Music	Artists	Length
1.	"Fateful Love" (운명처럼)	Kang Tae-gyu; Hwang Soo-jung; Park Song-ah; Kaemi	Kaemi	John Park	3:51
2.	"Fateful Love" (Inst.)		Kaemi		3:51
Total length:					7:42

=== Part 4 ===
No.	Title	Lyrics	Music	Artists	Length
1.	"U&I"	earattack(HeavyMental); Jackson	earattack(HeavyMental)	JB, Jackson (Got7)	3:36
2.	"U&I" (Inst.)		earattack(HeavyMental)		3:36
Total length:					7:12

=== Part 5 ===
No.	Title	Lyrics	Music	Artists	Length
1.	"You Look Nice Today" (오늘따라 예쁘다)	Crazy Gizibe	Idiot Park; Crazy Gizibe	Yoon Ddan Ddan; Eunha (GFriend)	3:12
2.	"Imagine"	Lim Ji-eun	Kaemi	Lim Ji-eun	3:01
3.	"You Look Nice Today" (Inst.)		Idiot Park; Crazy Gizibe		3:12
Total length:					9:25

=== Part 6 ===
No.	Title	Lyrics	Music	Artists	Length
1.	"The Package"	Kaemi; DinDin	Kaemi; Kim Se-jin	Kim Na-young, DinDin	3:56
2.	"The Package" (Inst.)		Kaemi; Kim Se-jin		3:56
Total length:					7:52

== Ratings ==
In this table, the blue numbers represent the lowest ratings and the red numbers represent the highest ratings.

Ep.	Original broadcast date	Title	Average audience share		
Ep.	Original broadcast date	Title	AGB Nielsen		TNmS
Ep.	Original broadcast date	Title	Nationwide	Seoul	Nationwide
1	October 13, 2017	I Didn't Want To Leave (떠나지 말 걸 그랬어)	1.749%	—N/a	1.9%
2	October 14, 2017	I Should Have Met Him (만나지 말 걸 그랬어)	1.685%	2.039%	1.9%
3	October 20, 2017	Don't Cry, Or A Snake Will Come Out (울지마, 거기 뱀 나와)	2.139%	2.710%	1.6%
4	October 21, 2017	It Will Work It, As Long As You Don't Mess Up Again (다 잘 될거야, 더 잘못하지 않으면)	1.664%	1.745%	2.1%
5	October 27, 2017	Love Is The Easiest (사랑이 가장 쉽다)	1.612%	—N/a	1.6%
6	October 28, 2017	Just Like A French Film (프랑스 영화처럼)	1.869%	2.187%	1.9%
7	November 3, 2017	The Time It Takes To Love (사랑하는데 걸리는 시간)	2.041%	—N/a	1.8%
8	November 4, 2017	The Time It Takes To Break Up (이별하는데 걸리는 시간)	1.705%	2.113%	1.8%
9	November 10, 2017	A Man And A Woman (어떤 남자, 어떤 여자)	1.580%	—N/a	1.5%
10	November 11, 2017	You Don't Even Understand (잘 알지도 못하면서)	1.955%	2.154%	1.9%
11	November 17, 2017	I Lived Like A Fool (바보처럼 살았군요)	1.540%	—N/a	1.3%
12	November 18, 2017	I Love You (사랑해)	2.381%	2.572%	2.1%
Average			1.827%	— (Note: Due to some ratings not recorded, the exact average rating is unknown.)	1.8%

- This drama airs on a cable channel/pay TV which normally has a relatively smaller audience compared to free-to-air TV/public broadcasters (KBS, SBS, MBC and EBS).
