= Lee Yeon-hee =

South Korean actress (born 1988)

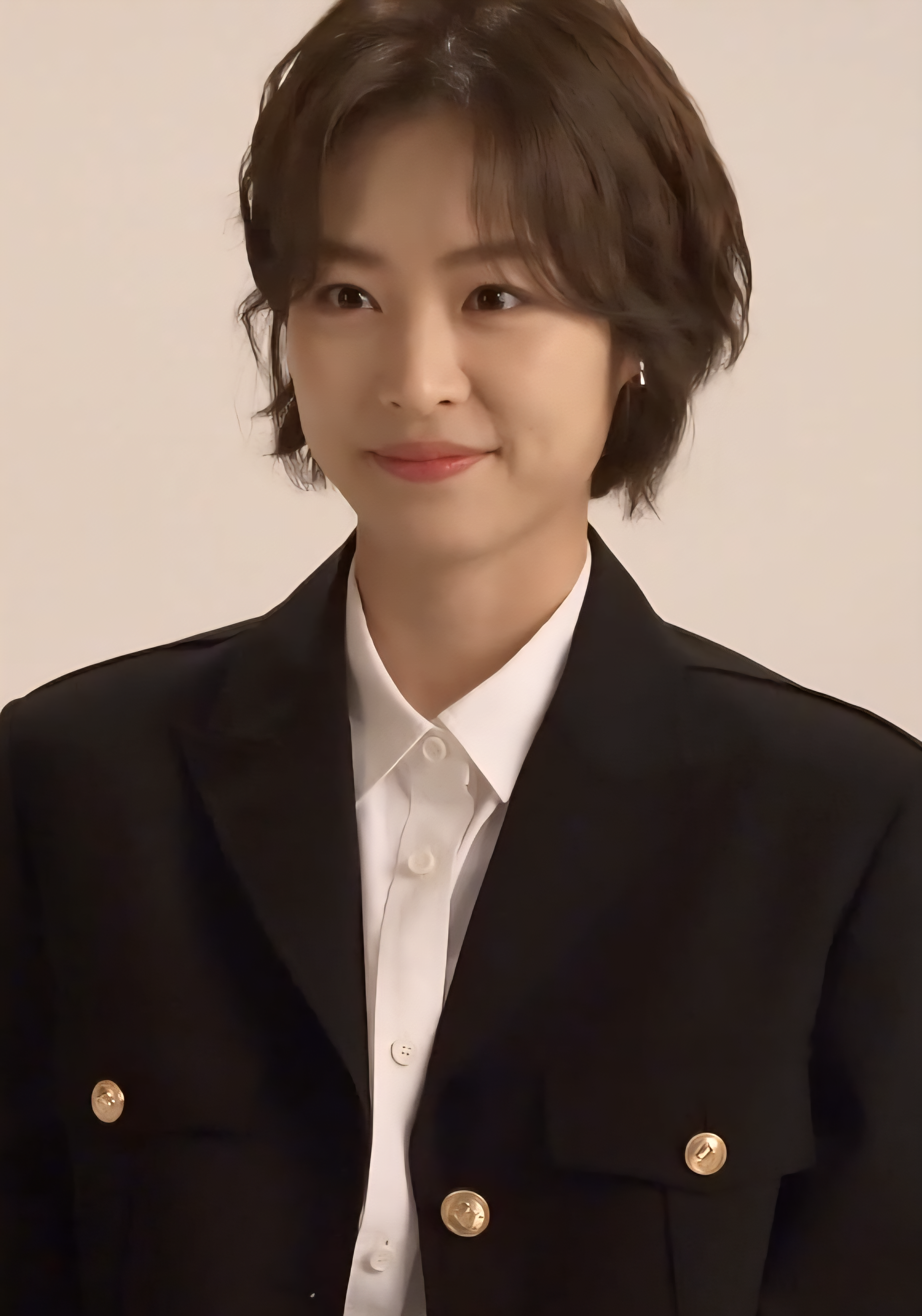
- Lee in June 2023
- Born: January 9, 1988 (age 38); Haenam County, South Jeolla Province, South Korea
- Occupations: Actress; model
- Years active: 2001–present
- Agent: Saram Entertainment
- Spouse: Unknown (m. 2020)
- Children: 1

Korean name
- Hangul: 이연희
- RR: I Yeonhui
- MR: I Yŏnhŭi

Lee Yeon-hee (Korean: 이연희; born January 9, 1988) is a South Korean actress and model. She is most known for her work in the television series East of Eden (2008), Phantom (2012), Miss Korea (2013), The Package (2017); and in the films A Millionaire's First Love (2006), M (2007), and Detective K: Secret of the Lost Island (2015).

== Early life ==
Lee was born on January 9, 1988, in Haenam County, South Jeolla Province, South Korea. In 2002, Lee successfully signed a contract with SM after she won the category of "Best Feature" in the SM Entertainment Best Youth contest. For the contest, she acted out a monologue, singing to Dana "Until the End of the World" and also did freestyle modeling poses. After she joined the company, she began intense training lessons on acting, singing, and dancing.

== Career ==
=== 2002–2006: Beginnings ===
Soon after she joined SM, Lee began her career by starring in music videos for SM artists, such as boy band TVXQ, Moon Hee-jun, Kangta, Shinhwa, and Fly to the Sky, overtaking SM artists Kim Bomi (of M.I.L.K.) and Lee Jiyeon (commonly known as CSJH The Grace's Lina) as "The SM music video girl".

Though Lee had relatively steady work between modelling in magazines, commercial ads and appearing in music videos, she did not officially debut until November 2004 where she starred as the younger version of the main character in the hit historical drama Emperor of the Sea, and appeared in the latter episodes of the daily drama My Lovely Family. Lee had her first major role in television in MBC's mini-series One Fine Day (2006).

=== 2007–2012: Rising popularity & acting criticism ===
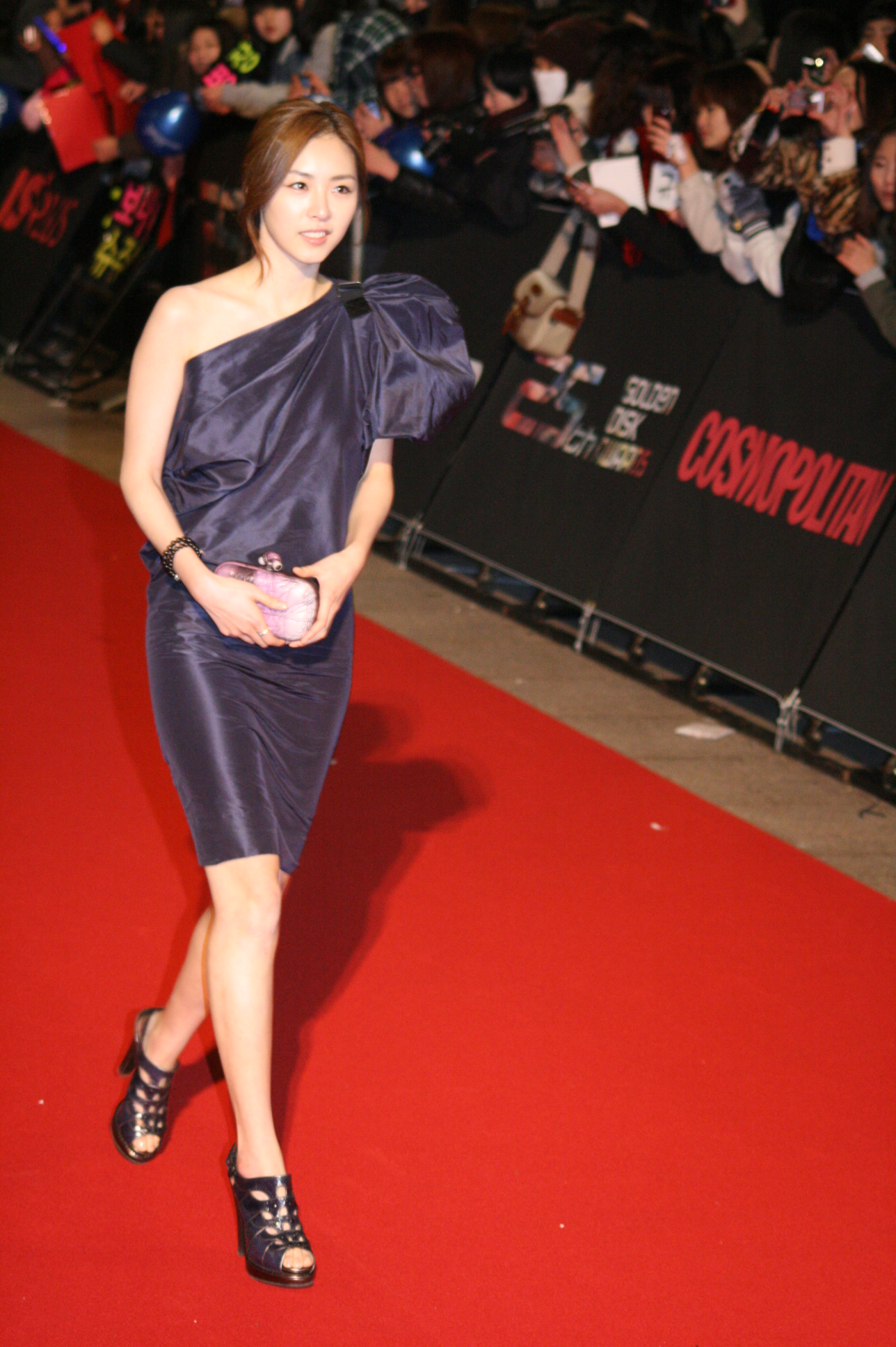
Lee at the 25th Golden Disc Awards

In 2006, Lee starred in romance melodrama A Millionaire's First Love alongside Hyun Bin. She also made her singing debut for the film, singing "Do-Re-Mi" from The Sound of Music and Insa for the film's original soundtrack. Lee's innocent image in the film earned her the title of "Nation's First Love" in Korea. Lee followed this with moderately successful film, M alongside Kang Dong-won; and starred alongside So Ji-sub in the short film, U-Turn.

In 2008, she starred as one of the main cast in 47th MBC Anniversary Project East of Eden. Despite the drama's success, her acting in the series received overwhelming negative criticism about her vocalization, unexpressive facial expressions, and unnatural emotional expression as problems in portraying her character. Lee returned to film, starring in Hello, Schoolgirl opposite Yoo Ji-tae. The story is based on the manhwa Soonjeong Manhwa by Kang Pool.

In 2011, Lee starred opposite Jang Dong-gun, Joe Odagiri and Fan Bing-bing in Kang Je-gyu's big budget historical film My Way, and in romance comedy series Paradise Ranch by S.M. Entertainment alongside label-mate Shim Chang-min of boy band TVXQ. In 2012, Lee reunited with U-Turn co-star So Ji-sub in the crime thriller Phantom. Both Lee and So were named promotional ambassadors for cyber crime prevention by the National Police Agency in 2012.

=== 2013–present: Career resurgence and continued success ===
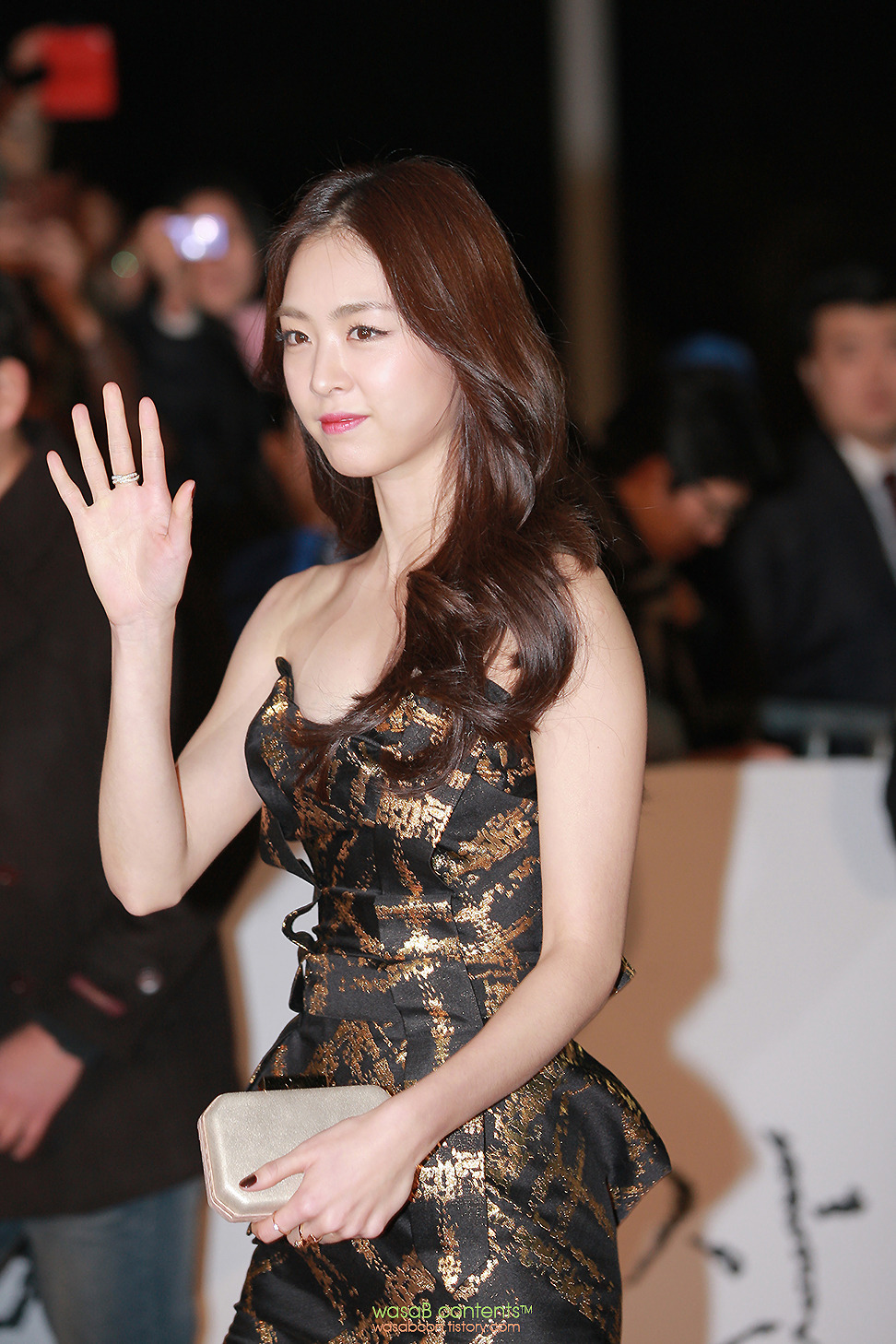
Lee at the 34th Blue Dragon Film Awards

In 2013, Lee made a special appearance in the historical drama Gu Family Book, where she received compliments for her improvement in acting. She next starred in romantic comedy film Marriage Blue, which tells the story of an engaged couple who experience last-minute jitters and cold feet just a week before their wedding ceremony. Lee closed the year with television series Miss Korea to positive reviews, with many considering her role as her best performance to date.

Lee further challenged herself with a provocative role as the mysterious and seductive Japanese geisha Hisako in the historical comedy Detective K: Secret of the Lost Island in 2015. She then starred in MBC's 54th anniversary drama, Splendid Politics.

In 2017, Lee starred in SBS's fantasy romance drama Reunited Worlds alongside Yeo Jin-goo. She then starred in JYP Entertainment's travel romance drama The Package opposite Jung Yong-hwa, and was complimented for her performance as a tour guide.

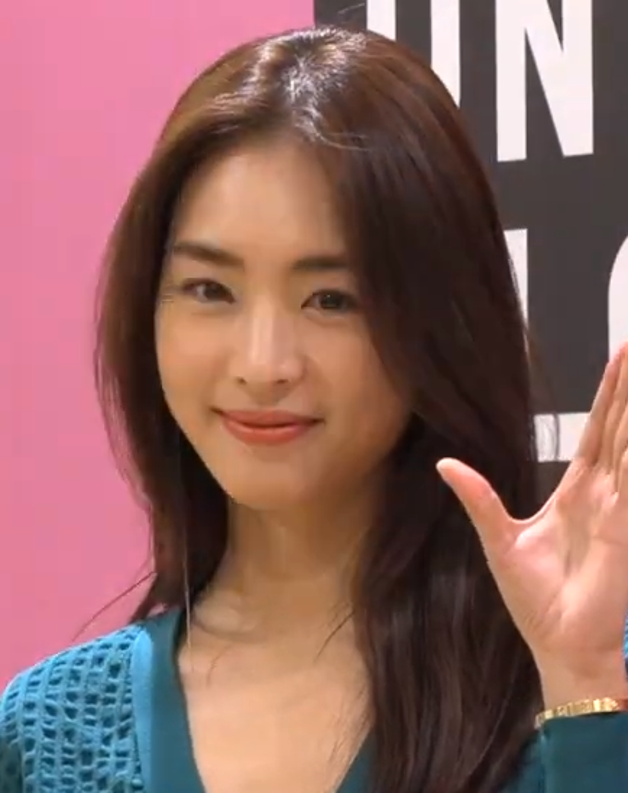
Lee in 2019

In 2020, Lee starred in mystery drama The Game: Towards Zero, reuniting with Ok Taec-yeon with whom she starred in the 2013 film Marriage Blue. However she was criticized for her bad acting skills by viewers.

In 2020, Lee signed a contract with Vast Entertainment after her contract with SM expired.

In January 2024, Lee signed with new agency Saram Entertainment after her contract with Vast Entertainment expired.

== Personal life ==
On June 2, 2020, Lee married her non-celebrity boyfriend in a private ceremony. On June 7, 2024, Lee announced that she was pregnant after four years of marriage. Lee gave birth to her first child, a daughter, on September 11.

== Filmography ==
=== Film ===
Year	Title	Role	Ref.
2006	A Millionaire's First Love	Choi Eun-hwan	
2007	M	Mi-mi	
2007	My Love	So-hyeon	
2008	U-Turn	Yeon-hee	
2008	Hello, Schoolgirl	Han Soo-young	
2011	My Way	Kim Eun-soo	
2013	Marriage Blue	So-mi	
2015	Detective K: Secret of the Lost Island	Hisako	
2021	New Year Blues	Jin Ah	

=== Television series ===
Year	Title	Role	Notes	Ref.
2004	Emperor of the Sea	young Jung-hwa		
2004	My Lovely Family	Yeon-ji		
2005	Resurrection	Kang Shin-young		
2006	One Fine Day	Goo Hyo-joo		
2008	East of Eden	Gook Young-ran/Grace		
2011	Paradise Ranch	Lee Da-ji		
2012	Phantom	Yoo Kang-mi		
2013	Gu Family Book	Yoon Seo-hwa	Special appearance	
2013	Miss Korea	Oh Ji-young		
2015	Splendid Politics	Princess Jeongmyeong		
2017	Reunited Worlds	Jung Jung-won		
2017	The Package	Yoon So-so		
2020	The Game: Towards Zero	Seo Jun Young		
2020	SF8	To Sun-ho	Episode: "Manxin"	

=== Web series ===
Year	Title	Role	Ref.
2022	Welcome to Wedding Hell	Kim Na-eun	
2023	Race	Park Yoon-jo	

=== Television shows ===
Year	Title	Role	Ref.
2018	Island Trio 2	Cast member	

=== Music video appearances ===
Year	Song title	Artist	Ref.
2001	"Alone"	Moon Hee-joon	
2001	"Our Story"	Moon Hee-joon feat. Oh Sang-eun	
2001	"Thanks God"	Kangta	
2002	"Condition of My Heart"	Fly to the Sky	
2002	"Hero"	Shinhwa	
2002	"Memories"	Kangta	
2002	"Pine Tree"	Kangta	
2002	"Propose"	Kangta	
2003	"Habit"	Fly to the Sky	
2004	"My Little Princess"	TVXQ	
2004	"The Way U Are"	TVXQ	
2005	"Persona"	Kangta	
2005	"One"	TVXQ	
2006	"Timeless"	Zhang Liyin feat. Xia	
2008	"Star Wish (I Will)"	Zhang Liyin	
2008	"The Left Shore of Happiness"	Zhang Liyin	
2008	"M-net Love Song 2008"	Zhang Liyin	
2009	"Wizard Of Oz"	Clazziquai	
2010	"Miss You"	SM the Ballad	

== Theater ==
Year	Title	Role	Ref.
2021	King Lear (리어왕)	Cordelia / stupid clown	

== Discography ==
=== Singles ===
Title	Year	Album
"Club No.1" (Super Junior featuring Lee Yeon-hee)	2009	Sorry, Sorry

== Accolades ==
=== Awards and nominations ===
Name of the award ceremony, year presented, category, nominee of the award, and the result of the nomination
Award ceremony	Year	Category	Nominee / Work	Result	Ref.
Asia Model Awards	2012	Fashionista Award	Lee Yeon-hee	Won	
Baeksang Arts Awards	2008	Baeksang Arts Award for Best New Actress – Film	M	Nominated	
Baeksang Arts Awards	2009	Baeksang Arts Award for Best New Actress – Television	East of Eden	Nominated	
Golden Cinematography Awards	2008	Best New Actress	M	Won	
KBS Drama Awards	2005	Best Young Actress	Resurrection	Nominated	
Korean Film Awards	2006	Best New Actress	A Millionaire's First Love	Nominated	
Korean Film Awards	2007	Best New Actress	M	Nominated	
Korean Film Actors' Guild Awards	2015	Popularity Award	Detective K: Secret of the Lost Island	Won	
Max Movie Awards	2008	Best New Actress	M	Won	
MBC Drama Awards	2008	Best Couple Award	Lee Yeon-hee (with Song Seung-heon); East of Eden	Won	
MBC Drama Awards	2008	Best New Actress	East of Eden	Won	
MBC Drama Awards	2008	Popularity Award, Actress	East of Eden	Won	
MBC Drama Awards	2013	Excellence Award, Actress in a Miniseries	Gu Family Book	Nominated	
MBC Drama Awards	2014	Popularity Award, Actress	Miss Korea	Nominated	
MBC Drama Awards	2014	Top Excellence Award, Actress in a Miniseries	Miss Korea	Nominated	
MBC Drama Awards	2015	Excellence Award, Actress in a Special Project Drama	Splendid Politics	Nominated	
MBC Drama Awards	2015	Popularity Award, Actress	Splendid Politics	Nominated	
SBS Drama Awards	2012	Excellence Award, Actress in a Drama Special	Phantom	Nominated	
SBS Drama Awards	2012	Netizen Popularity Award, Actress	Phantom	Nominated	
SBS Drama Awards	2017	Top Excellence Award, Actress in a Wednesday-Thursday Drama	Reunited Worlds	Nominated	

=== Listicles ===
Name of publisher, year listed, name of listicle, and placement
Publisher	Year	Listicle	Placement	Ref.
Korean Film Council	2021	Korean Actors 200 (Note: Introduces 200 actors that best represent the present and future of Korean cinema to the people in the film industry all over the world.)	Included	
