= Marriage Blue =

- Theatrical poster
- Directed by: Hong Ji-young
- Written by: Ko Myung-ju
- Produced by: Min Jin-su
- Starring: Kim Kang-woo; Kim Hyo-jin; Ju Ji-hoon; Lee Yeon-hee; Ok Taecyeon; Ma Dong-seok; Guzal Tursunova; Lee Hee-joon; Go Joon-hee
- Cinematography: Lee Seon-yeong
- Edited by: Kim Sun-min
- Music by: Lee Jae-jin
- Production company: Soo Film
- Release date: November 21, 2013
- Running time: 118 minutes
- Country: South Korea
- Language: Korean

Marriage Blue (Korean: 결혼전야; RR: Gyeolhonjeonya; lit. 'The Night Before the Wedding') is a 2013 South Korean romantic comedy film that follows the misadventures of four engaged couples in the week leading up to their weddings.

== Plot ==
Tae-kyu (Kim Kang-woo) is a former professional baseball player who currently coaches for a minor league team. His girlfriend Joo-young (Kim Hyo-jin) runs a successful urology clinic. They've broken up once before then gotten back together, and now they're about to get married. But a week before their wedding, Tae-kyu learns something about Joo-young that makes him feel betrayed and jealous. Growing increasingly neurotic, he becomes obsessed with finding all about her exes and dating past.

Chef Won-chul (Ok Taecyeon) and nail artist So-mi (Lee Yeon-hee) have been a couple for seven years and their wedding day is fast approaching. But feeling that something is missing in their lives, So-mi suspects that Won-chul doesn't feel passionate towards her anymore and merely regards their relationship as a comfortable living arrangement. Several days before getting hitched, So-mi travels to Jeju Island for a nail art competition, and there she meets and becomes attracted to Kyung-soo (Ju Ji-hoon), a tour guide and webcomic writer.

Geon-ho (Ma Dong-seok) is a sweet, middle-aged bachelor who owns a flower shop, and he's about to marry Vika (Guzal Tursunova), who hails from Uzbekistan. When Geon-ho is suddenly afflicted with erectile dysfunction, he goes to see Joo-young, a urologist, who tells him that there's nothing wrong with him physically and his impotency may be caused by stress. Since Vika is beautiful and much younger than him, Geon-ho struggles with feelings of inadequacy and starts to wonder if she's only marrying him to attain Korean citizenship.

Dae-bok (Lee Hee-joon) works at Joo-young's urology clinic. He's recently began dating Yi-ra (Go Joon-hee), a wedding planner. Then one day, during a baseball game, Yi-ra tells him that she's pregnant, and Dae-bok immediately proposes. But as they prepare for their wedding, they keep arguing constantly. It isn't that Dae-bok is scared of becoming a father, but he senses from Yi-ra's cynical attitude that she doesn't feel their relationship has any kind of long-term future, so he desperately tries to change her mind.

== Cast ==
- Kim Kang-woo as Tae-kyu
- Kim Hyo-jin as Joo-young
- Ju Ji-hoon as Kyung-soo
- Lee Yeon-hee as So-mi
- Ok Taec-yeon as Won-chul
- Ma Dong-seok as Geon-ho
- Guzal Tursunova as Vika
- Lee Hee-joon as Dae-bok
- Go Joon-hee as Yi-ra
- Oh Na-ra as Seon-ok
- Joo as Ah-reum
- Song Jae-ho as Kim Seok-dong
- Lee Joo-sil as Kim Seok-dong's wife
- Jang Gwang as Yi-ra's father
- Jeon Soo-kyung as Dress shop owner, Yi-ra's boss
- Kim Kwang-kyu as Doctor Kim, Joo-young's ex-husband
- Hwang Jeong-min as Woman touring Jeju
- Lee Dal-hyeong as Installation engineer
- Lee Mi-do as Eccentric bride
- Kim Ji-young as Dae-bok's mother
- Nam Sang-ji as Society employee

== Release ==
Marriage Blue opened in South Korea on November 21, 2013, at third place in the box office, with a gross of ₩2.26 billion. Despite little hype, it succeeded in securing a niche market amongst some heavier hitters, and on November 25, the fifth day of its release, the film ranked first in the daily box office chart, beating Friend: The Great Legacy and The Hunger Games: Catching Fire. On its second week, it placed second on the weekly box office chart, with 841,563 admissions. At the end of its run, it had a total of 1,214,351 admissions.

In addition to South Korea, rights to Marriage Blue were pre-sold to seven Asian countries, and local theaters in Singapore, Hong Kong, Japan, Thailand, Taiwan and China screened the film from December 2013 to May 2014.
