= A Day of Renew =

Studio album by Bada
- Released: October 22, 2003
- Genres: K-pop; dance
- Language: Korean
- Label: Plyzen

Bada chronology
A Day of Renew (2003)	Aurora (2004)

Singles from A Day of Renew
- 1. "Music" Released: October 22, 2003; 2. "Somehow Somewhere" Released: October 23, 2003

A Day of Renew is the debut solo album by South Korean singer Bada, released in 2003.

== Track listing ==
1. "Prologue"
2. "새로운 날에 (A Day of Renew)"
3. "Somehow Somewhere"
4. "노을 (Noel)"
5. "One Day"
6. "헤어지기 전에 (Before Parting)"
7. "Music"
8. "Zero (Love in Vain)"
9. "Dream Maker"
10. "그래볼게.. (Ok..)"
11. "This Way"
12. "Be Mine Tonight"
13. "집으로 오는 길 (On the Road to Home)"
14. "Music" (alternate version) (bonus track)
