= Ok Taec-yeon =

South Korean singer and actor (born 1988)

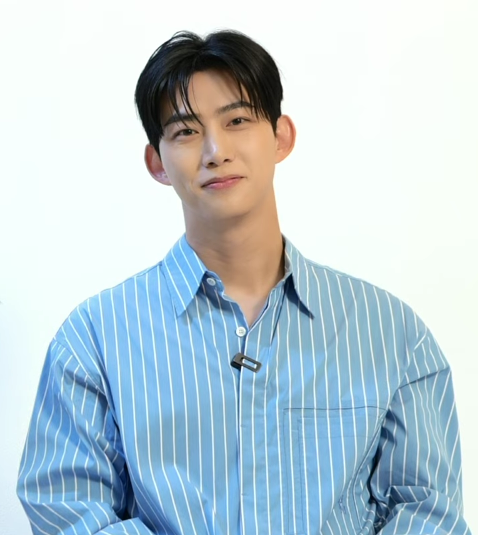
- Ok in July 2023
- Born: December 27, 1988 (age 37); Gangnam District, Seoul, South Korea
- Education: Dankook University (BS); Korea University Graduate School of International Studies (MS)
- Occupations: Singer-songwriter; rapper; actor
- Years active: 2008–present
- Agents: 51K (South Korea); WME (USA)
- Spouse: Unknown (m. 2026)
- Musical career
- Also known as: TY
- Genre: K-pop
- Labels: 51K; JYP
- Member of: 2PM
- Formerly of: JYP Nation; One Day
- Website: taecyeon.jp

Korean name
- Hangul: 옥택연
- Hanja: 玉澤演
- RR: Ok Taekyeon
- MR: Ok T'aegyŏn

Ok Taec-yeon (Korean: 옥택연; born December 27, 1988), known mononymously as Taecyeon, is a South Korean singer-songwriter, rapper, and actor. In 2008, he debuted as the rapper of the South Korean boy band 2PM. In 2010, Ok debuted as an actor in the Korean drama Cinderella's Stepsister and has since starred in notable television series such as Dream High (2011), Bring It On, Ghost (2016), Vincenzo (2021), and The First Night with the Duke (2025), as well as films such as Hansan: Rising Dragon (2022). As a solo artist, he has released one Japanese studio album titled Taecyeon Special: Winter Hitori in 2017.

== Early life and education ==
Ok Taecyeon was born in Gangnam District, Seoul, South Korea, but emigrated at the age of 10 with his family to Boston, Massachusetts, where he lived for seven years. He attended John Glenn Middle School and Bedford High School, joining the chess club, jazz band, junior varsity soccer team, and National Honor Society at the latter, before returning to Korea to pursue his career. Ok transferred to Young Dong High School in Seoul, studied Business Administration at Dankook University, and studied International Business at Korea University Graduate School of International Studies.

In 2005, Ok's older sister Jihyen persuaded him to participate in a JYP Entertainment audition she had noticed via Internet promotions. After his reluctant agreement, both headed for New York City on his 17th birthday. A week later, he was amongst the final 35 chosen to go further in the competition and received a call to move to South Korea. Ok originally applied to become a model, but the judges suggested he try dancing and singing. Eventually, he was named one of the dozen finalists (including his future members, Lee Jun-ho and Hwang Chan-sung) to compete in the show Superstar Survival, but was the first contestant to leave the show. Despite this, JYP Entertainment still offered him a trainee contract.

Ok is fluent in English, Korean, and Japanese. He is also familiar with the Busan dialect, which he has used in the dramas Cinderella's Stepsister, Wonderful Days, and Save Me.

== Career ==
=== 2PM ===
In 2008, he participated in Mnet's Hot Blooded Men, a program that chronicles the rigorous training of thirteen aspiring trainees, all vying for a coveted spot in the boy band One Day. This initiative ultimately led to the formation of two distinct boy bands, namely 2AM and 2PM.

Half a year following the televised airing of Hot Blooded Men, the group 2PM made their debut with the release of their inaugural single "10 Out of 10" from their first single album titled Hottest Time of the Day. However, it was their second single album, 2:00PM Time For Change, that propelled them to mainstream success in Korean music, solidifying their meteoric rise. As of 2021, the group has released seven studio albums in Korea and five studio albums in Japan. Taecyeon has written and composed several tracks for the group, including "Promise (I'll Be)", the title track of their sixth Korean studio album, Gentlemen's Game.

During the group's live performances of their song "Heartbeat" from 2009 to 2010, Ok rose to prominence by frequently ripping off his shirt; the practice was uncommon for K-pop idols at the time and resulted in Korean media outlets giving 2PM the label of "beast idols" (Korean: 짐승돌; RR: jimseungdol) and Ok the moniker of "Ripped Taecyeon" (Korean: 찢택연; RR: jjittaegyeon).

=== Solo activities ===
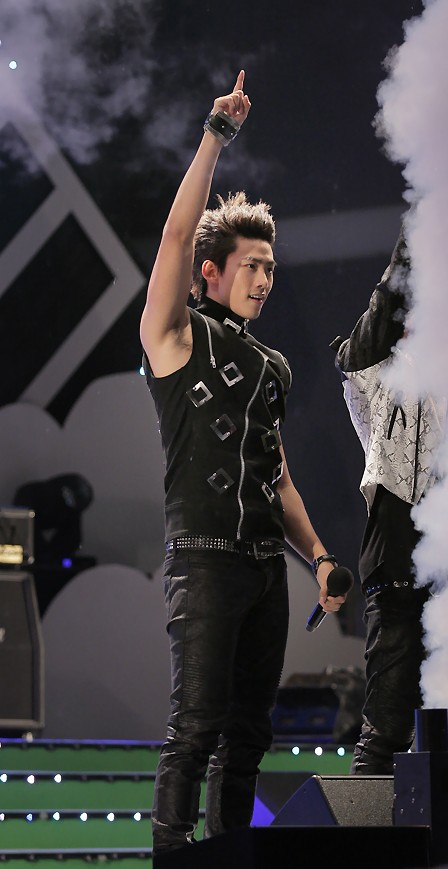
Ok in 2011

Ok was featured in Baek Ji-young's hit song "My Ear's Candy" (내 귀에 캔디), released on August 13, 2009. Baek revealed that she asked Ok to feature on the song after listening to his rap on 2PM's single "10 Out of 10".

In 2012, Ok teamed up with his fellow Dankook University alumni students to produce a digital single album titled Share (with Taecyeon). The album was performed live at Dankook University for the matriculation ceremony. The title song "Wings" featured penned rap lyrics written by Ok. The album also included a remake of "A Night Like Tonight" (오늘같은 밤) by (Lee Gwang-Jo, with an original rap written by Ok himself. The album went on sale on February 28, 2012, with all proceeds donated back the University.

Ok released his debut solo Japanese album Taecyeon Special: Winter Hitori on January 18, 2017. As part of the solo project, he held his first solo concert, Winter Hitori, at the Tokyo Dome City Hall in Japan on January 2–3. Footage from the concert was released as a DVD by Epic Records Japan on December 27, 2017; the DVD peaked at number 13 on the Oricon Weekly DVD Chart.

In July 2018, it was announced that Ok had signed an exclusive contract with 51K, an agency founded by actor So Ji-sub, following the end of his contract with JYP Entertainment. His former agency reported that he will remain a member of 2PM despite the move. On February 23, 2023, 51K announced that Ok had signed a contract with WME for his activities in the United States.

Since 2013, Ok has regularly held fan meetings in South Korea. From September 16, 2023, to October 21, 2023, Ok held his first solo fan meeting tour titled SpecialTY with stops in five Asian cities: Taipei, Manila, Hong Kong, Bangkok, and Jakarta. On March 8, 2025, Ok held a solo fan meeting in Yokohama titled SweeTY. On June 24, 2025, Ok held a joint fan meeting in Taipei with his agency's founder So Ji-sub titled SONICe ParTY.

=== Acting career ===
In 2010, Ok made his acting debut in the KBS drama series Cinderella's Sister alongside Moon Geun-young and Chun Jung-myung. In 2011, he and his bandmate Wooyoung starred in the high school drama Dream High, which received high domestic ratings as well as international popularity, winning awards abroad. Ok collaborated with his bandmates and other artists on two songs for the show's soundtrack. In September 2011, FujiTV announced that Ok was cast on the Sunday drama Boku to Star no 99 Nichi, his first regular role in a Japanese drama.

In 2013, Ok made his film debut in the romantic comedy Marriage Blue. He wrote and composed the opening and ending tracks of the film. Also in 2013, he starred in OCN's police drama Who Are You? as a detective. In 2014, he starred in KBS's weekend drama Wonderful Days, playing a tough-fisted bodyguard. In 2015, Ok was cast in KBS's political drama Assembly, playing an aspiring police officer who studies at the library to pass his entrance exams by day and works as an official's chauffeur by night.

In 2016, he starred in tvN's horror-comedy Bring It On, Ghost, as well as the web series Touching You. That same year, he also featured in the web drama 7 First Kisses by Lotte Duty Free. In 2017, he starred in the mystery-thriller film House of the Disappeared. He then starred in OCN's thriller drama Save Me later that year.

In 2020, he starred in MBC's mystery drama The Game: Towards Zero as a prophet helping the police with their investigation of a serial killer, reuniting with Lee Yeon-hee with whom he starred in the 2013 film Marriage Blue. It was his first acting role since his military discharge.

In 2021, he starred in the tvN drama Vincenzo as Jang Jun-woo, his first major antagonistic role since his acting debut. Vincenzo became one of the highest-rated series on South Korean cable television, as well as one of the most internationally-viewed Korean series on Netflix in 2021. In the same year, Ok starred in the historical drama Secret Royal Inspector & Joy, which premiered on both tvN and iQiyi in November 2021.

In 2022, Ok played the role of Lim Jun-young, a Joseon spy who sneaks into the Japanese army camp, in the war action film Hansan: Rising Dragon, the second installment of Kim Han-min's Yi Sun-sin trilogy. The film became the second highest-grossing Korean film of 2022. In the same year, he starred in tvN's crime drama Blind.

In 2023, he played the role of Seon Woo-hyul, a half-human half-vampire who falls in love with a human, in KBS's romantic comedy Heartbeat. Also in 2023, he made a cameo appearance in the first season of the Netflix series XO, Kitty, his first acting credit in an American work. In 2024, Ok made his Japanese film debut with La Grande Maison Paris, playing a Korean-Canadian pastry chef.

In 2025, he starred in KBS's isekai romance drama, The First Night with the Duke, as Lee Beon, a prince in a fantasy world. He won an Excellence in Acting Award for Best Actor in a Miniseries and the Best Couple Award with Girls' Generation's Seohyun for his role at the 2025 KBS Drama Awards, the former being his first award won for acting.

== Other activities ==
=== Variety television and hosting ===
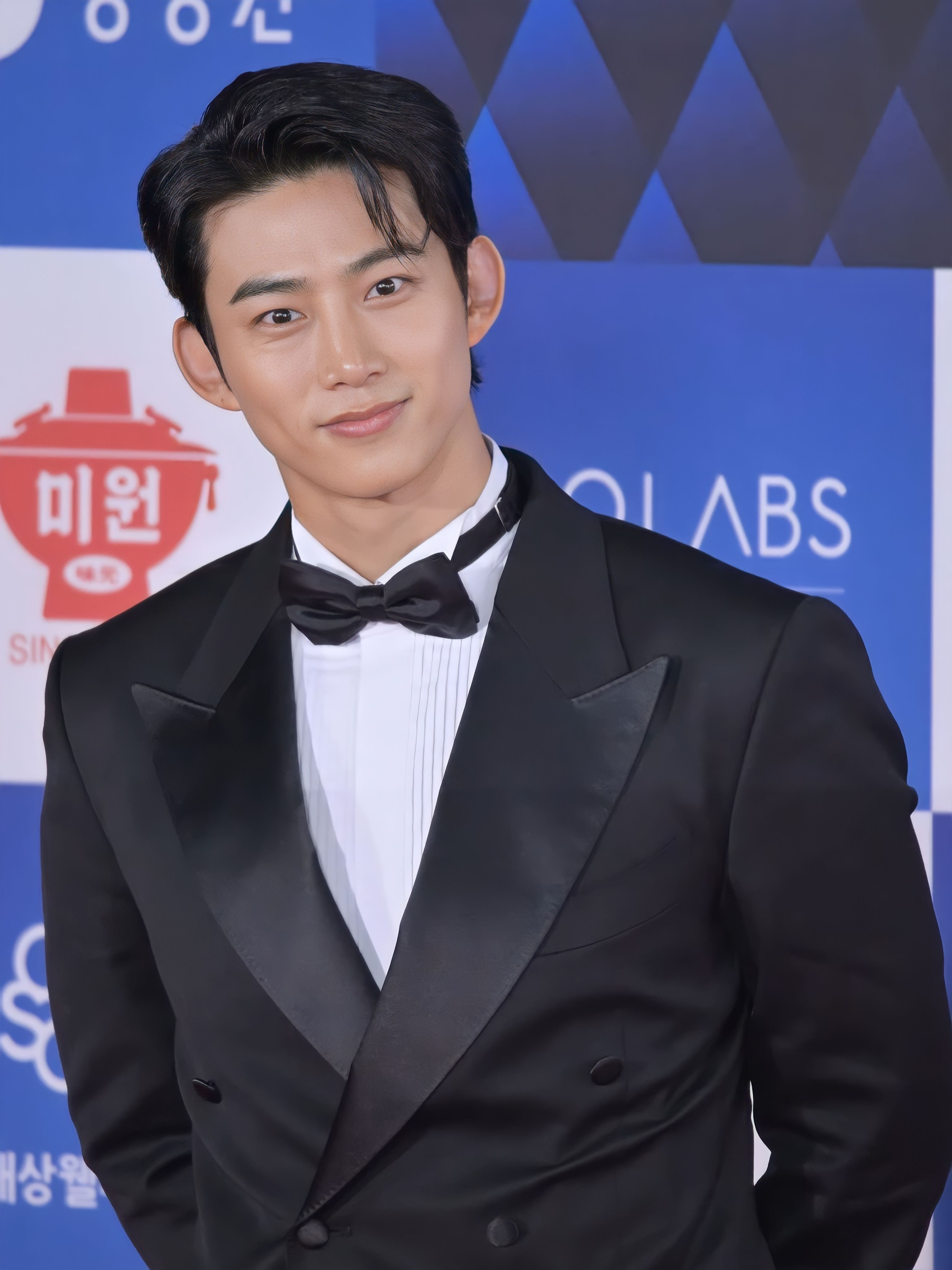
Ok in 2022

Ok and his bandmate Wooyoung hosted SBS's music show Inkigayo with actress Ha Yeon-joo from July 2009 to January 2010 and with f(x)'s Sulli from February 2010 to July 2010. In 2010, Ok was cast for SBS's short-lived variety program Family Outing 2, a sequel to the popular show Family Outing, alongside entertainment personalities such as Shin Bong-sun and other Korean idols such as Girls' Generation's Lim Yoona and 2AM's Jo Kwon.

In 2013, it was announced that Ok would form an on-screen couple with Taiwanese actress Emma Wu in the first global edition of the celebrity dating show We Got Married. As part of the show, the couple composed and recorded the song "I Love You", which was released on domestic music streaming sites on June 16.

In 2014, Ok and actor Lee Seo-jin, whom he previously co-starred on the weekend drama Wonderful Days with, were the main cast members of the debut season of tvN's popular cooking variety show Three Meals a Day, directed by producer Na Young-seok. The two later rejoined for a second season in 2015, joined by actor Kim Kwang-kyu. Ok was praised for his hardworking image and easygoing personality on the show.

=== OKCAT ===
On October 11, 2013, Ok hosted a 30-minute press conference on Ustream to introduce Okcat, a green cat character to the public. Okcat emoticons had previously been released on the chat application KakaoTalk. During the conference, Ok told the history of his development of the character and released his sketches to the public. The Okcat shop was opened on the same day and featured a line of products with the image of the Okcat.

Every year from 2013 to 2016, Ok held a series of Okcat-themed fan meetings around Christmastime in South Korea titled Lonely Okcat's Christmas; he also released several digital singles for these events. Upon returning from his military service, Ok continued these fan meetings in 2019, 2022, and 2023. Ok was unable to hold in-person Okcat fan meetings in 2020 and 2021 due to the COVID-19 pandemic in South Korea, but he held an online fan event titled I'm OK on December 12, 2020. In lieu of a Christmas Okcat-themed fan meeting in 2024, Ok held a series of four fan meetings titled SweeTY Okcat's Happy Valentine's Day on February 15–16, 2025.

== Personal life ==
=== Relationship and marriage ===
On November 1, 2025, Ok announced through an Instagram post that he would be marrying his non-celebrity partner of ten years in the upcoming spring; his agency later confirmed the news separately. Earlier that year, in February, his agency denied rumors of his engagement to his partner following leaked photographs of Ok kneeling and presenting his partner with a ring, which were claimed to have been taken for a birthday celebration in 2024. He held his wedding at a private location in Seoul on April 24, 2026.

=== Military enlistment ===
On December 9, 2010, a JYP spokesperson revealed that Ok planned on giving up his American permanent residence visa and already received his official confirmation for his permanent residence cancellation on December 1. In 2008, Ok had a physical examination for the military draft, but found he would only be able to enlist for public service personnel due to his poor vision and a dislocated shoulder. In 2010, 2012, and 2013, he underwent surgeries to correct the disk and to remove pins in his upper arm from a serious break in 2013. He was cleared for active duty in December 2013 after a second physical examination, but delayed his enlistment due to a busy workload.

On September 4, 2017, Ok enlisted as an active-duty soldier and began his mandatory military service. On October 18, he completed his basic military training and was placed at 9th Infantry Division in Gyeonggi Province as a military instruction assistant.

In February 2018, Ok participated in various 2018 Winter Olympics events as one of the volunteers under the command of the Ministry of National Defense. He hosted many cultural shows and concerts and performed as a member of 2PM alongside his bandmates at the Olympic Headliner Show. On June 20, 2018, Prime Minister Lee Nak-yon recognized and praised Ok's efforts to enlist in active duty during his congratulatory speech at the 15th Exemplary Military Servicemen Awards, which Ok was hosting. On October 1, 2018, Ok led the future combat system demonstration in the 70th Armed Forces Day Celebration. The demonstration introduced the Warrior Platform program, which includes new and improved combat gear and equipment. Ok ranked first on real-time search engines as he led the final salute to President Moon Jae-in.

In February 2019, Ok received an early promotion as a Sergeant for his exceptional conduct while serving as a military instruction assistant at the 9th Armed Forces Division in Gyeonggi Province. Due to his superb records, exemplary character, and great performance, Ok was appointed as a Special Class Warrior by his division commander and was awarded as a "Model Soldier" by the Ministry of National Defense. He also earned the nickname "Captain Korea" from Korean netizens because of his physique that mirrored the famous Marvel superhero, Captain America; the nickname has been used in headlines on several news portals and broadcasts. In an interview, Ok expressed the pressure of having the nickname, "It was a nickname that brought a lot of pressure, but it also made me want to work that much harder. I'll continue to work hard to fit that nickname." Ok completed his military service and was discharged on May 16, 2019.

== Filmography ==
Key
†	Denotes films that have not yet been released

=== Film ===
Year	Title	Role	Notes	Ref.
2013	Marriage Blue	Won-chul		
2017	House of the Disappeared	Priest Choi		
2022	Hansan: Rising Dragon	Im Joon-young		
2024	La Grande Maison Paris	Rick Yuan	Japanese film	

=== Television series ===
Year	Title	Role	Notes	Ref.
2010	Cinderella's Stepsister	Han Jung-woo		
2011	Dream High	Jin Gook / Hyun Shi-hyuk		
2011	Boku to Star no 99 Nichi	Tae-sung	Japanese drama	
2013	Who Are You?	Cha Gun-woo		
2014	Wonderful Days	Kang Dong-hee		
2015	Assembly	Kim Kyu-hwan		
2016	Bring It On, Ghost	Park Bong-pal		
2017	Save Me	Han Sang-hwan		
2020	The Game: Towards Zero	Kim Tae-pyung		
2021	Vincenzo	Jang Jun-woo / Jang Han-seok		
2021	Secret Royal Inspector & Joy	Ra Yi-eon		
2022	Blind	Ryu Sung-joon		
2022	O'PENing	Policeman	Cameo (Season 5 Episode 8)	
2023	XO, Kitty	Ocean Park	Cameo (Episode 8)	
2023	Heartbeat	Seon Woo-hyul		
2025	The First Night with the Duke	Lee Beon / Prince Gyeong Seong		
2026	Soul Mate	Johan Hwang	Japanese drama	
2026	Agent Kim Reactivated	Park Young-kwang	Cameo (Episode 3)	
TBA	Taerung Zombie Village †	Do Rak-koo		

=== Television film ===
Year	Title	Role	Notes	Ref.
2016	My Happy Home	Taecyeon	Cameo	
2017	You Are Closer Than I Think	Kang Sung-min's friend	Cameo	

=== Web series ===
Year	Title	Role	Notes	Ref.
2016	Touching You	Do Jin-woo		
2016	7 First Kisses	Ok Taec-yeon	Episodes 5–6	

=== Variety and reality shows ===
Year	Title	Notes	Ref.
2006	Superstar Survival	Contestant	
2010	Family Outing 2	Episodes 1–17	
2013	The Human Condition	Episodes 24–25 (Living Without Stress), 44–47 (Living Without Electricity)	
2013	We Got Married (Global Edition)	Episodes 1–15; with Emma Wu	
2014	Three Meals a Day: Jeongseon Village	Episodes 1–11	
2015	Three Meals a Day: Jeongseon Village Season 2	Episodes 1–18	
2016	Mommy	Pilot; MC with Lee Hwi-jae	
2017	Suddenly a Millionaire	Episodes 1–7	

=== Hosting ===
Year	Title	Notes	Ref.
2009	Inkigayo	July 26 – January 24; with Wooyoung and Ha Yeon-joo	
2010	Inkigayo	February 7 – July 11; with Wooyoung and Sulli	
2011	Hallyu Dream Concert	with Park Shin-hye and Choi Min-ho	
2013	Korea-China Friendship Concert	with Lim Yoona & Cho Kyu-hyun (at Beijing, China)	
2014	KBS Song Festival	with Lee Hwi-jae and Lim Yoona	
2015	KBS Song Festival	with Lee Hwi-jae and Hani	
2024	Asia Star Entertainer Awards 2024	with Kwon Yu-ri	
2025	Seoul International Drama Awards	with Jang Do-yeon	

=== DVDs ===
Title	DVD details	Peak positions	Sales
Title	DVD details	JPN	Sales
Taecyeon (From 2PM) Premium Solo Concert “Winter Hitori”	Released: December 27, 2017; Language: Japanese; Performances: 1. "Winter Hitori" (Winter 一人); 2. "Don't Want To" (やりたくない; Yaritakunai); 3. "I Love You, You Love Me" (君だけじゃない; Kimidakejanai) (Rock Ver.); 4. "Fight" (Rock ver.); 5. "Kiseki" (キセキ) (song by GReeeeN); 6. "Toc Toc Toc"; 7. "Chocolate" (チョコレート); 8. "Not Only You" (君だけじゃない; Kimidakejanai); 9. "Move Your Body"; 10. "Please Come Back" (song by Taecyeon and Chansung); 11. "Kimidakeni" (君だけに; Only You); 12. "Traición"; 13. "This is Love"; 14. "Never Give Up"; 15. "Teaser" (Taecyeon ver.); 16. "Don't Forget" (忘れないで; Wasurenaide) (Taecyeon ver.); 17. "I Love U, U Love Me" (君だけじゃない; Kimidakejanai)	13	—N/a

== Discography ==
=== Studio albums ===
Title	Album details	Peak chart positions		Sales
Title	Album details	JPN	JPN Hot	Sales
Taecyeon Special: Winter Hitori	Released: January 18, 2017; Label: Epic Records Japan; Formats: CD, digital download	3	5	JPN: 39,896

=== Singles and collaborations ===
Title	Year	Peak chart positions	Album
Title	Year	KOR	Album
As lead artist
"Wings" (날개) (with Blue Bears)	2012	—	Share (with Taecyeon) (digital single)
"A Night Like Tonight" (오늘같은 밤) (with Blue Bears)	2012	—	Share (with Taecyeon) (digital single)
"Classic" (with Park Jin-young, Suzy, and Wooyoung)	2012	58	Reebok Classic promotional single
"I Love U, U Love Me"	2013	—	Non-album single
"It's Time" (feat. Yubin and San E)	2013	—	Grown (Grand Edition)
"Bounce" (song by JJ Project) (with Junho, Jay B, and Jinyoung)	2014	—	JYP Nation Korea 2014 'One Mic'
"U Don't Know" (with Lim Seul-ong)	2014	—	JYP Nation Korea 2014 'One Mic'
"Please Come Back" (with Chansung feat. Baek A-yeon)	2014	—	Go Crazy! (Grand Edition)
"The Word, Love" (with Chansung)	2014	—	Go Crazy! (Grand Edition)
"Christmas With You"	2014	—	Non-album single
"Be My Merry Christmas"	2015	—	Non-album single
"50 50" (with Jun. K)	2016	—	Galaxy of 2PM (Limited Edition Ver. B. – Jun. K x Taecyeon Edition)
"Merry Christmas To You"	2016	—	Non-album single
"Winter Hitori" (Winter 一人)	2016	—	Taecyeon Special: Winter Hitori
As featured artist
"My Ear's Candy" (내 귀에 캔디) (Baek Ji-young feat. Taecyeon)	2009	—	Ego
"Yes I'm In Love" (Bada feat. Taecyeon)	2009	—	See the Sea
"Madness" (Miss A feat. Taecyeon)	2012	142	Independent Women Part III
"Hello" (Japanese ver.) (Cho Yong-pil feat. Taecyeon)	2013	—	Hello
"Just Feeling" (느낌적인 느낌) (Kim Tae-woo feat. Jun. K and Taecyeon)	2017	—	T-WITH
"1995" (Lesley Chiang feat. Taecyeon)	2024	—	Non-album single

=== Soundtrack appearances ===
Title	Year	Peak chart positions	Album
Title	Year	KOR	Album
"Dream High" (with Wooyoung, Kim Soo-hyun, Suzy, and Joo)	2011	41	Dream High OST
"My Valentine" (with Nichkhun, feat. J.Y. Park)	2011	16	Dream High OST
"My Way to You" (너에게 가는 길) (Junho feat. Taecyeon)	2013	58	7th Grade Civil Servant OST
"I Love You" (with Emma Wu)	2013	—	We Got Married OST
"Marriage Blue Opening"	2013	—	Marriage Blue OST
"Marriage Blue Ending" (with cast of Marriage Blue)	2013	—	Marriage Blue OST
"Wan Nun Wan Nee Wan Nhai" (วันนั้น วันนี้ วันไหน) (Nichkhun feat. Taecyeon)	2015	—	Touch the Sky - Chalui OST

== Accolades ==
=== Awards and nominations ===
Name of the award ceremony, year presented, category, nominee of the award, and the result of the nomination
Award ceremony	Year	Category	Nominee / Work	Result	Ref.
APAN Star Awards	2014	Excellence Award, Actor in a Serial Drama	Wonderful Days	Nominated	
Baeksang Arts Awards	2011	Best New Actor – Television	Cinderella's Stepsister	Nominated	
Baeksang Arts Awards	2011	Most Popular Actor – Television	Cinderella's Stepsister	Nominated	
Baeksang Arts Awards	2014	Most Popular Actor – Film	Marriage Blue	Nominated	
Baeksang Arts Awards	2014	Most Popular Actor – Television	Wonderful Days	Nominated	
Bugs Music Awards	2011	OST of the Year	"My Valentine" (with Nichkhun & Park Jin-young)	Won	
KBS Drama Awards	2010	Best New Actor	Cinderella's Stepsister	Nominated	
KBS Drama Awards	2010	Netizen Award, Actor	Cinderella's Stepsister	Nominated	
KBS Drama Awards	2011	Best Couple Award (with Bae Suzy)	Dream High	Nominated	
KBS Drama Awards	2014	Excellence Award, Actor in a Serial Drama	Wonderful Days	Nominated	
KBS Drama Awards	2014	Netizen Award, Actor	Wonderful Days	Nominated	
KBS Drama Awards	2025	Top Excellence Award, Actor	The First Night with the Duke	Nominated	
KBS Drama Awards	2025	Excellence Award, Actor in a Miniseries	The First Night with the Duke	Won	
KBS Drama Awards	2025	Best Couple Award (with Seohyun)	The First Night with the Duke	Won	
Korean Film Shining Star Awards	2017	Popularity Award	House of the Disappeared	Won	
KWEB FEST	2016	Best Actor	Touching You	Nominated	
MBC Drama Awards	2020	Top Excellence Award, Actor in a Wednesday-Thursday Miniseries	The Game: Towards Zero	Nominated	
Mnet 20's Choice Awards	2011	Hot Male Body (Best Six-Pack)	Ok Taec-yeon	Nominated	

=== Listicles ===
Name of publisher, year listed, name of listicle, and placement
Publisher	Year	Listicle	Placement	Ref.
Korean Film Council	2021	Korean Actors 200 (Note: Introduces 200 actors that best represent the present and future of Korean cinema to the people in the film industry all over the world.)	Included	
