= Made in Sea =

Studio album by Bada
- Released: January 26, 2006; March 20, 2006 (Repackage)
- Genre: K-pop; dance; Ballad
- Language: Korean
- Label: CJ Music

Bada chronology
Aurora (2004)	Made in Sea (2006)	See the Sea (2009)

Singles from Made in sea
- 1. "Find The Way" Released: January 20, 2006; 2. "V.I.P." Released: March 20, 2006

Made in Sea is the third studio album released on January 26, 2006 by South Korean singer Bada. The album represented a new concept for Bada as a singer - whereas her first two albums showed her as very feminine, this time her image changed to a more androgynous look.

The lead single for her third album was a ballad titled "Find the Way", a cover of a popular Japanese song originally by Mika Nakashima. The music video featured her fellow S.E.S. members Eugene and Shoo. The track was not promoted on live music shows.

Although the album initially did poorly, it was given a re-release because of the success of the follow-up single "V.I.P.", which showcased Bada's markedly improved dancing abilities.

== Repackage version ==
The repackage version was released two months after, which includes a CD and DVD.

== Track listing (original release) ==
1. Intro
2. Find The Way
3. Diary
4. V.I.P
5. Destiny
6. Forever Love
7. One Step Slower
8. Beyond
9. Place of Sun
10. Like A Shining Star (One Take Version)
11. Here I Am Waiting
12. V.I.P (Remix by East4A)
13. Find The Way (Instrumental)
