= East of Eden (South Korean TV series) =

2008 South Korean television series

- Promotional poster for East of Eden
- Hangul: 에덴의 동쪽
- Hanja: 에덴의 東쪽
- RR: Edenui dongjjok
- MR: Edenŭi tongtchok
- Genre: Action; Romance
- Written by: Na Yeon-sook; Lee Hong-ku
- Directed by: Kim Jin-man; Choi Byeong-kil
- Starring: Song Seung-heon; Yeon Jung-hoon; Lee Da-hae; Han Ji-hye; Lee Yeon-hee; Park Hae-jin
- Music by: Kim Soo-han
- Country of origin: South Korea
- Original language: Korean
- No. of episodes: 56

Production
- Executive producer: So Won-young
- Producers: Kim Kwang-soo; Kim Kwang-il; Kim Ki-bum
- Production locations: South Korea; Hong Kong; Macau; Philippines
- Cinematography: Ha Jae-young; Jung Seung-woo
- Editor: Bae Hee-kyung
- Production companies: Core Contents Media; Jellybox; Chorokbaem Media
- Budget: ₩25 billion

Original release
- Network: MBC TV
- Release: August 25, 2008 – March 10, 2009

East of Eden (Korean: 에덴의 동쪽; RR: Edenui dongjjok) is a 2008 South Korean television series, starring Song Seung-heon, Yeon Jung-hoon, Lee Da-hae, Han Ji-hye, Park Hae-jin and Lee Yeon-hee. It was produced by Chorokbaem Media as a 47th Anniversary Special Project Drama for MBC, on which it aired from August 25, 2008, to March 10, 2009, on Mondays and Tuesdays at 21:55 for 56 episodes. The ₩25 billion drama tells the story of the brothers Dong-chul (Song) and Dong-wook (Yeon). Their fates diverge after the murder of their coal miner father, with one joining the mob and the other becoming a successful lawyer.

== Plot ==
A period epic that spans the years 1960 to 2000s, East of Eden tells a saga of the bitter rivalry between two men who are eternally bound by fate. Historic events are referenced, such as the rapid industrialization of the 1970s and 1980s, Taebaek coal miners' strikes and student-led democracy movements.

Shin Tae-hwan (Jo Min-ki) is the managing director of a coal mine in Taebaek. The true embodiment of ruthless ambition, he strives to inherit the coal mining company Taesung Group. In the process, he kills Lee Ki-chul (Lee Jong-won), a miner crusading for workers' rights who has been blocking his path to success. He also seduces Yoo Mi-ae (Shin Eun-jung), a nurse at Taebaek Hospital, only to coldly brush her away after he is tired of her.

At the same moment that Yang Chun-hee (Lee Mi-sook), wife of the deceased Ki-chul, is giving birth to their second son at Taebaek Hospital, Shin Tae-hwan's wife also gives birth to a baby boy. Filled with rage at Shin Tae-hwan's betrayal, the nurse Mi-ae comes up with a scheme to fulfill her own revenge. She switches the two babies. By doing so, she viciously transforms the fates of not just two lives, but those around them.

Years later, Chun-hee's sons Lee Dong-chul (Song Seung-heon) and Lee Dong-wook (Yeon Jung-hoon) have taken different paths in life. To alleviate their poverty, Dong-chul becomes a gangster, while the younger Dong-wook dreams of becoming a prosecutor to avenge his family by using the law against Shin Tae-hwan. Two women enter Dong-chul's life: the smart and sensible Min Hye-rin (Lee Da-hae), and Gook Young-ran (Lee Yeon-hee), the willful daughter of his gang boss (Yoo Dong-geun). Meanwhile, Shin Myung-hoon (Park Hae-jin), who's been molded in his father Tae-hwan's spiteful, selfish image, sets his eye on Kim Ji-hyun (Han Ji-hye), Dong-wook's sweetheart.

Although Dong-chul is on the other side of the law, he remains protective of Dong-wook, but a revelation shakes him to his core: that his nemesis Shin Myung-hoon is actually his biological brother while the beloved brother that had been beside him all these years is actually the biological son of his enemy.

== Cast ==
=== Main characters ===
- Song Seung-heon as Lee Dong-chul
  - Shin Dong-woo as Dong-chul (5 years old)
  - Kim Bum as Dong-chul (15 years old)
- Yeon Jung-hoon as Lee Dong-wook
  - Park Gun-woo as Dong-wook (10 years old)
- Lee Da-hae as Min Hye-rin
- Han Ji-hye as Kim Ji-hyun
  - Nam Ji-hyun as Ji-hyun (10 years old)
- Park Hae-jin as Shin Myung-hoon
  - Won Deok-hyun as Myung-hoon (10 years old)
- Lee Yeon-hee as Gook Young-ran / Grace
- Jo Min-ki as Shin Tae-hwan (Myung-hoon's father)
- Lee Mi-sook as Yang Chun-hee (Dong-chul and Dong-wook's mother)
- Yoo Dong-geun as Gook Dae-hwa (Young-ran's father)

=== Supporting characters ===
- Dennis Oh as Mike Packard (Young-ran's fiancé)
- Lee Jong-won as Lee Ki-chul (Dong-chul and Dong-wook's father)
- Jeon Mi-seon as Jung-ja (Ki-soon's mother)
- Park Hyun-sook as Yang Ok-hee (Chun-hee's sister)
- Jeon So-min as Lee Ki-soon
  - Jin Ji-hee as Ki-soon (9 years old)
- Kim Sung-kyum as resident Oh
- Na Hyeon-hui as Oh Yoon-hee
- Lee Won-jae as Kyung-tae
- Shim Hye-jin as Young-ran's mother
- Yoon Dong-hwan as lawyer Kim Tae-seon
- Jung Hye-young as Janice / Jae-hee
- Shin Eun-jung as Yoo Mi-ae / Rebecca
- Hwang Jung-eum as Kim So-jung
- Kang Eun-tak as Han Soo-jae
- Jeon Sung-hwan as stationmaster Kim Gab-soo (Ji-hyun's grandfather)
- Lee Seok-joon as Father Han
- Kim Hyung-min as Wang-geon
- Go Yoon-hoo as Dok-sa
- Park Chan-hwan as Uncle Chang
- Kim Hak-chul as Kang Gi-man
- Park Geun-hyung as President Min (Hye-rin's father)
- Jung Young-sook as Bae Hwa-mi (Mr. Min's wife)
- Jung So-young as Min Hye-ryung (Hye-rin's sister)
- Park Sung-woong as Baek Sung-hyun
- Lee Sol-gu as Choi Hak-sung
- Jung Yoon-seok as Yo-seob

== Awards and nominations ==
Year	Award	Category	Recipient	Result
2008	2nd Korea Drama Awards	Netizen Popularity Award	Kim Bum	Won
2008	21st Grimae Awards	Grand Prize (Daesang)	Ha Jae-young, Jung Seung-woo (cinematographers)	Won
2008	21st Grimae Awards	Best Production Director	Kim Jin-man	Won
2008	MBC Drama Awards	Grand Prize (Daesang)	Song Seung-heon	Won
2008	MBC Drama Awards	Top Excellence Award, Actor	Song Seung-heon	Nominated
2008	MBC Drama Awards	Top Excellence Award, Actress	Lee Mi-sook	Won
2008	MBC Drama Awards	Excellence Award, Actor	Jo Min-ki	Won
2008	MBC Drama Awards	Excellence Award, Actress	Han Ji-hye	Won
2008	MBC Drama Awards	Excellence Award, Actress	Lee Da-hae	Nominated
2008	MBC Drama Awards	Golden Acting Award, Actor in a Serial Drama	Park Geun-hyung	Won
2008	MBC Drama Awards	Golden Acting Award, Supporting Actress	Shin Eun-jung	Won
2008	MBC Drama Awards	Golden Acting Award, Veteran Actor	Yoo Dong-geun	Won
2008	MBC Drama Awards	PD Award	Yeon Jung-hoon	Won
2008	MBC Drama Awards	Best New Actor	Park Hae-jin	Won
2008	MBC Drama Awards	Best New Actress	Lee Yeon-hee	Won
2008	MBC Drama Awards	Best Child Actor/Actress	Park Gun-tae	Won
2008	MBC Drama Awards	Best Child Actor/Actress	Shin Dong-woo	Won
2008	MBC Drama Awards	Best Child Actor/Actress	Nam Ji-hyun	Won
2008	MBC Drama Awards	Writer of the Year	Na Yeon-sook	Won
2008	MBC Drama Awards	Viewer's Favorite Drama of the Year	East of Eden	Nominated
2008	MBC Drama Awards	Popularity Award, Actor	Song Seung-heon	Won
2008	MBC Drama Awards	Popularity Award, Actress	Lee Yeon-hee	Won
2008	MBC Drama Awards	Best Couple Award	Song Seung-heon and Lee Yeon-hee	Won
2009	45th Baeksang Arts Awards	Best Actor (TV)	Song Seung-heon	Nominated
2009	45th Baeksang Arts Awards	Best Actress (TV)	Han Ji-hye	Nominated
2009	45th Baeksang Arts Awards	Best New Actor (TV)	Kim Bum	Nominated
2009	45th Baeksang Arts Awards	Best New Actress (TV)	Lee Yeon-hee	Nominated
