= Dream High =

2011 South Korean television series

- Promotional poster
- Hangul: 드림하이
- RR: Deurimhai
- MR: Tŭrimhai
- Genre: Music; Teen; Romantic comedy
- Screenplay by: Park Hye-ryun
- Directed by: Lee Eung-bok; Kim Seong-yoon
- Creative director: Bae Yong-joon
- Starring: Bae Suzy; Kim Soo-hyun; Ok Taec-yeon; Hahm Eun-jung; Jang Wooyoung; Lee Ji-eun
- Opening theme: "Dream High"
- Composer: Park Jin-young
- Country of origin: South Korea
- Original language: Korean
- No. of seasons: 1
- No. of episodes: 16 (+1 special)

Production
- Executive producers: Kwak Ki-won (KBS); Yang Geun-hwan; Jimmy Wook Jeong; Choi Kwan-yong
- Producer: Baek Sang-hoon (KBS)
- Running time: 65–70 minutes
- Production companies: Holym (Note: A JYP-KeyEast joint venture); CJ Media

Original release
- Network: KBS2
- Release: January 3 – February 28, 2011

Related
- Dream High 2

Dream High (Korean: 드림하이) is a 2011 South Korean television series starring Bae Suzy, Kim Soo-hyun, Ok Taec-yeon, Hahm Eun-jung, Jang Wooyoung and Lee Ji-eun. It aired on KBS2 from January 3 to February 28, 2011, every Monday and Tuesday at 22:00 (KST).

The drama was popular among teenagers, bringing in average viewership ratings of 15.7% during its two-month run. A special episode, in which the cast of the show performed the Dream High Special Concert on a stage near Seoul on February 24, 2011, was aired on March 1, 2011, the day after the series ended. The show was successful internationally and helped the proliferation of the Korean Wave.

A sequel, Dream High 2, aired one year later with a new cast. The drama was later adapted into a stage musical in both Japan and South Korea.

== Synopsis ==
Six students at Kirin High School share dreams of becoming K-pop idols, among others. During their school years, they learn how to develop their singing, songwriting and dancing skills while undergoing personal growth. They also start to develop feelings for one another. Each of them has their own strengths and weaknesses, but they strive to debut with the support and guidance of one another.

== Cast ==
=== Main ===
- Bae Suzy as Go Hye-mi
  - Lee Joo-yeon as young Go Hye-mi (Ep. 2 & 5)

She originally wanted to become an opera singer but is forced to take up mainstream pop to pay off her father's debt to a gangster.

- Kim Soo-hyun as Song Sam-dong

A country bumpkin who is a music prodigy with a rare disease. He develops a one-sided crush on Hye-mi.

- Ok Taec-yeon as Jin-guk / Hyun Shi-hyuk
  - Kang Yi-seok as young Jin-guk (Ep. 2, 5 & 10)

An aspiring dancer who plans on making his entertainment debut due to the contentious relationship with his father, the mayor, who hasn't acknowledged him as his son. Hye-mi's Love Interest.

- Hahm Eun-jung as Yoon Baek-hee

Formerly best friends with Hye-mi, the two become bitter enemies when Hye-mi betrays Baek-hee during an audition.

- Jang Wooyoung as Jason

An American-born dancer who plans on making his entertainment debut in Korea.

- Lee Ji-eun (IU) as Kim Pil-sook

She was discouraged from pursuing music because she was shy and overweight. She also has the gift of perfect pitch.

=== Supporting ===
- Ahn Gil-kang as Ma Doo-shik
- Ahn Sun-young as Kang Oh-sun (Oh-hyuk's older sister)
- Ahn Seo-hyun as Go Hye-sung (Hye-mi's younger sister)
  - Park Eun-bin as 16-year-old Hye-sung (Ep. 16)
- Lee Hye-sook as Song Nam-boon (Sam-dong's mother)
- Choi Il-hwa as Hyun Moo-jin (Jin-guk's father)
- Park Hyuk-kwon as Go Byung-jik (Hye-mi's father)
- Jang Hee-soo as Kang Hee-seon (Baek-hee's mother)
- Park Hwi-soon as Jin-gook's roommate (Ep. 1–2, 5)

==== Teachers in Kirin High School ====
- Um Ki-joon as Kang Oh-hyuk
- Lee Yoon-ji as Shi Kyung-jin
- Park Jin-young as Yang Jin-man
- Lee Byung-joon as Principal Shi Bum-soo
- Lee Yoon-mi as Maeng Seung-hee
- Baek Won-kil as Gong Min-chul
- Bae Yong-joon as President Jung Ha-myung (Ep. 1–4)
- Joo Young-hoon as the composing teacher (Ep. 11)

==== Students in Kirin High School ====
- Jeon Ah-min as Jo In-sung (Jin-gook's friend)
- Joo as Jung Ah-jung
- Han Ji-hoo as Park Do-joon
- Yoon Young-ah as Lee Ri-ah
- Park Jin-sang as Jun Tae-san
- Han Bo-reum as Ha So-hyun
- Bae Noo-ri as Han So-ri (Ep. 6, 9, 12–13)

=== Special appearances ===
- Sumi Jo as Sumi Jo (Ep. 1)
- Kim Hyun-joong as Kim Hyun-joong (Ep. 1)
- Song Hae as variety show host (Ep. 2, 3)
- Jay B as Jason's back up dancer (Ep. 3)
- Young K as Jason's back up dancer (Ep. 3)
- Shownu as Jason's back up dancer (Ep. 3)
- Nichkhun as Lee Ri-ah's CF partner (Ep. 8)
- Koo Jun-yup as Koo Jun-yup (Ep. 9, 10)
- Hwang Chan-sung as Oh-sun's imaginary boyfriend (Ep. 12)
- Leeteuk as Leeteuk (Ep. 13)
- Eunhyuk as Eunhyuk (Ep. 13)
- miss A as flash mob dancers (Ep. 16)
- 2AM as flash mob dancers (Ep. 16)
- Dal Shabet as Baek-hee's students (Ep. 16)

== Production ==
In January 2009, media outlets reported that Bae Yong-joon, hallyu actor and chairman of KeyEast, would co-produce a television drama with Park Jin-young's entertainment company JYP. A television drama production company, Holym, was established as a joint venture between KeyEast and JYP Entertainment. In April 2010, CJ Media signed a MoU with Holym becoming the part of production team. Bae being the creative producer of the drama, he provided overall concept, goals and ideas while Park composed the music and choreographed the dance for the series. The screenplay was written by Park Hye-ryun and the series was directed by Lee Eung-bok.

Bae Yong-joon was also part of the cast for four episodes making his first small screen appearance in three years. While Park Jin-young marked his acting debut with the series. Ok Taec-yeon and Jang Wooyoung from 2PM, Bae Suzy from Miss A, Hahm Eun-jung from T-ara, singer IU and Kim Soo-hyun were selected for the main cast. Kim was the only non-idol among the cast, but he had studied music and dance at JYP Entertainment for 3 months in order to portray his role.

== Original soundtrack ==
Dream High: Original Sound Track

Soundtrack album by Various Artists
- Released: February 14, 2011
- Recorded: 2010–11
- Genres: K-pop; Ballad; Dance; Metal
- Length: 43:46
- Languages: Korean; English
- Labels: Holym; LOEN
- Producer: Park Jin-young

Singles from Dream High
- 1. "Dream High" & "Someday" Released: January 3, 2011; 2. "Maybe" Released: January 10, 2011; 3. "Someone's Dream" Released: January 17, 2011; 4. "Winter Child" Released: January 19, 2011; 5. "If" Released: January 31, 2011; 6. "May I Love You" & "Don't Leave Me" Released: February 7, 2011

Original Album Tracklist
No.	Title	Artist	Length
1.	"Dream High" (드림하이)	Taecyeon, Wooyoung, Suzy, Kim Soo-hyun & Joo	3:46
2.	"Someday"	IU	3:37
3.	"My Valentine"	Taecyeon & Nichkhun (feat. Park Jin-young)	4:07
4.	"If" (못 잊은 거죠)	Park Jin-young	3:54
5.	"Maybe"	Sunye	3:00
6.	"May I Love You" (사랑하면 안될까)	Changmin & Jinwoon	3:34
7.	"Don't Leave Me" (가지마)	Jun. K & Lim Jeong-hee	4:19
8.	"Someone's Dream" (어떤이의 꿈)	San E (feat. Sohyang of POS)	3:16
9.	"Winter Child" (겨울아이)	Suzy	3:38
10.	"Dreaming"	Kim Soo-hyun	3:41
11.	"If" (Inst.)	Park Jin-young	3:54
12.	"Maybe" (Inst.)	Sunye	3:00
Total length:			43:46

=== Chart performance ===
Title	Year	Peak positions	Remarks	Ref.
Title	Year	KOR	Remarks	Ref.
"Dream High" (Taecyeon, Wooyoung, Suzy, Kim Soo-hyun and Joo)	2011	41	Part 1	
"Someday" (IU)	2011	1	Part 1	
"Maybe" (Sunye)	2011	10	Part 2	
"Someone's Dream" (San E)	2011	48	Part 3	
"Winter Child" (Suzy)	2011	12	Part 4	
"If" (Park Jin-young)	2011	3	Part 5	
"May I Love You" (Changmin and Jinwoon)	2011	5	Part 6	
"Don't Leave Me" (Lim Jeong-hee and Jun. K)	2011	60	Part 6	
"My Valentine" (Taecyeon and Nichkhun)	2011	16		
"Dreaming" (Kim Soo-hyun)	2011	4		

=== Plagiarism allegation ===
While "Someday" fared well commercially and reached number one on the Gaon Digital Chart, it was embroiled in controversy after the song's writer and composer, Park Jin-young, was accused of plagiarizing the song, "To My Man". Songwriter Kim Shin-il won his plagiarism lawsuit against Park Jin-young in 2013, however, an appeal to the Supreme Court of Korea led to an eventual High Court retrial in 2015.

== Reception ==
On October 5, 2011, Japan's daily paper Sankei Sports reported that Dream High was handed the Grand Prize and Hallyu award at the SKY PerfecTV! awards which took place in Tokyo. On October 24, 2011, Dream High was given the Special Award for Foreign Drama at the 5th International Drama Festival held in Tokyo. On December 31, 2011, Dream High won the following at the KBS Drama Awards: Best Supporting Actress for Lee Yoon-ji; Best New Actor and Popularity Award for Kim Soo-hyun; Best New Actress for Bae Suzy; and Best Couple Award for Kim Soo-hyun and Bae Suzy. On May 10, 2012, Dream High was honored at the Rose d'Or, the global entertainment television festival ceremony which took place at Lucerne, Switzerland. It won the Golden Rose under the Youth category, the first ever Korean production to do so.

In 2012, Philippines network ABS-CBN dubbed the show as "The most successful Korean series of 2011".

Dream High is one of the most watched South Korean dramas on Chinese video streaming platform Youku with over 26,300,000 views and an average of 2,000,000 views per episode (As of July 2016).

== Ratings ==
In the table below, the blue numbers represent the lowest ratings and the red numbers represent the highest ratings.

Ep.	Original broadcast date	Average audience share			
Ep.	Original broadcast date	Nielsen Korea		TNmS	
Ep.	Original broadcast date	Nationwide	Seoul	Nationwide	Seoul
1	January 3, 2011	10.7% (13th)	11.2% (13th)	11.3% (8th)	14.2% (5th)
2	January 4, 2011	10.8% (14th)	11.4% (13th)	11.5% (10th)	13.9% (6th)
3	January 10, 2011	13.1% (7th)	13.3% (7th)	11.7% (8th)	13.8% (5th)
4	January 11, 2011	13.8% (5th)	14.3% (5th)	13.4% (4th)	15.4% (5th)
5	January 17, 2011	15.5% (3rd)	17.0% (4th)	13.7% (3rd)	15.8% (3rd)
6	January 18, 2011	15.8% (4th)	17.1% (4th)	13.1% (4th)	15.9% (4th)
7	January 24, 2011	15.9% (3rd)	17.2% (4th)	15.3% (3rd)	17.5% (3rd)
8	January 31, 2011	16.3% (4th)	17.7% (5th)	14.9% (3rd)	17.4% (3rd)
9	February 1, 2011	16.7% (3rd)	18.3% (5th)	14.9% (3rd)	16.9% (4th)
10	February 7, 2011	17.6% (3rd)	19.3% (3rd)	16.7% (3rd)	19.2% (3rd)
11	February 8, 2011	17.9% (3rd)	19.3% (3rd)	16.6% (3rd)	19.3% (3rd)
12	February 14, 2011	16.7% (3rd)	18.9% (3rd)	15.8% (3rd)	17.8% (3rd)
13	February 15, 2011	17.9% (3rd)	20.1% (3rd)	17.2% (3rd)	20.1% (3rd)
14	February 21, 2011	17.6% (3rd)	19.3% (3rd)	16.4% (3rd)	18.9% (3rd)
15	February 22, 2011	17.9% (3rd)	19.5% (3rd)	17.2% (3rd)	19.7% (3rd)
16	February 28, 2011	17.2% (3rd)	18.6% (3rd)	18.2% (3rd)	20.7% (3rd)
Average		15.7%	17.0%	14.9%	17.3%
Special	March 1, 2011	12.2% (9th)	13.6% (8th)	12.1% (6th)	14.4% (5th)

== Accolades ==
=== Awards and nominations ===
Year	Award	Category	Recipient	Result	Ref.
2011	47th Baeksang Arts Awards	Best New Director (TV)	Lee Eung-bok	Nominated	
2011	47th Baeksang Arts Awards	Best New Actor (TV)	Kim Soo-hyun	Nominated	
2011	47th Baeksang Arts Awards	Best New Actor (TV)	Park Jin-young	Nominated	
2011	47th Baeksang Arts Awards	Best New Actress (TV)	Suzy	Nominated	
2011	47th Baeksang Arts Awards	Popularity Award, Actor (TV)	Kim Soo-hyun	Nominated	
2011	47th Baeksang Arts Awards	Popularity Award, Actor (TV)	Park Jin-young	Nominated	
2011	47th Baeksang Arts Awards	Popularity Award, Actress (TV)	Suzy	Nominated	
2011	47th Baeksang Arts Awards	Popularity Award, Actress (TV)	IU	Nominated	
2011	47th Baeksang Arts Awards	Popularity Award, Actress (TV)	Eunjung	Nominated	
2011	4th Korea Drama Awards	Best Writer	Park Hye-ryun	Nominated	
2011	4th Korea Drama Awards	Best Supporting Actor	Um Ki-joon	Nominated	
2011	4th Korea Drama Awards	Best Supporting Actress	Lee Yoon-ji	Nominated	
2011	4th Korea Drama Awards	Best New Actor	Kim Soo-hyun	Won	
2011	4th Korea Drama Awards	Best New Actress	Suzy	Nominated	
2011	4th Korea Drama Awards	Popularity Award	Kim Soo-hyun	Won	
2011	6th Naver Awards	Most-popular PC search ㅡ Monthly	Dream High	First place	
2011	6th Naver Awards	Most-popular Mobile search ㅡ Monthly	Dream High	First place	
2011	6th Naver Awards	Most-popular PC search ㅡ Yealy	Dream High	4th place	
2011	6th Seoul International Drama Awards	Best Miniseries	Dream High	Nominated	
2011	13th Mnet Asian Music Awards	Best OST	"Someday" – IU	Nominated	
2011	SKY PerfecTV! Awards	Grand Prize	Dream High	Won	
2011	SKY PerfecTV! Awards	Hallyu Award	Kim Soo-hyun	Won	
2011	5th Tokyo International Drama Festival	Special Award for Foreign Drama	Dream High	Won	
2011	3rd Bugs Music Awards	OST of the Year	"My Valentine" – Taecyeon & Nichkhun feat. Park Jin-young	Won	
2011	KBS Drama Awards	Excellence Award, Actress in a Miniseries	Suzy	Nominated	
2011	KBS Drama Awards	Best New Actor	Kim Soo-hyun	Won	
2011	KBS Drama Awards	Best New Actor	Park Jin-young	Nominated	
2011	KBS Drama Awards	Best New Actress	Suzy	Won	
2011	KBS Drama Awards	Best New Actress	IU	Nominated	
2011	KBS Drama Awards	Best Supporting Actress	Lee Yoon-ji	Won	
2011	KBS Drama Awards	Best Young Actress	Ahn Seo-hyun	Nominated	
2011	KBS Drama Awards	Popularity Award	Kim Soo-hyun	Won	
2011	KBS Drama Awards	Popularity Award	Suzy	Nominated	
2011	KBS Drama Awards	Best Couple Award	Kim Soo-hyun and Suzy	Won	
2011	KBS Drama Awards	Best Couple Award	Taecyeon and Suzy	Nominated	
2011	KBS Drama Awards	Best Couple Award	Wooyoung and IU	Nominated	
2011	Cyworld Digital Music Awards	Song of the Month (February)	"Dreaming" – Kim Soo-hyun	Won	
2011	7th Innolife Japan Entertainment Awards	Next Generation Female Star	Eunjung	Won	
2011	7th Innolife Japan Entertainment Awards	Next Generation Female Star	Suzy	Nominated	
2011	7th Innolife Japan Entertainment Awards	Next Generation Female Star	Kang So-ra	Nominated	
2011	7th Innolife Japan Entertainment Awards	Next Generation Male Star	Kim Soo-hyun	Nominated	
2011	7th Innolife Japan Entertainment Awards	Best Drama	Dream High	Nominated	
2011	DramaBeans Awards	Favourite Comedic Drama	Dream High	Nominated	
2011	DramaBeans Awards	Best Kiss	Suzy & Kim Soo-hyun	Nominated	
2011	DramaBeans Awards	Favourite character	Kim Soo-hyun	Nominated	
2011	DramaBeans Awards	Best Posse	Suzy & Eunjung	Nominated	
2011	DramaBeans Awards	Funniest Noraebang scene	IU & Wooyoung	Nominated	
2011	DramaBeans Awards	Best Use of an Idol Star	Eunjung	Nominated	
2011	DramaBeans Awards	Best Use of an Idol Star	Suzy	Nominated	
2011	The Fact Awards	Best acting idol	Eunjung	3rd place	
2011	The Fact Awards	Best Drama	Dream High	2nd place	
2012	Rose d'Or Awards	Golden Rose (Children & Youth) Award	Dream High	Won	
2012	7th Seoul International Drama Awards	Outstanding Korean Drama	Dream High	Nominated	
2012	7th Seoul International Drama Awards	Outstanding Korean Actress	Suzy	Nominated	
2013	USTv Student's Choice Award	Best Foreign Soap Opera	Dream High	Won	

=== Listicles ===
Publisher	Year	List	Rank	Ref.
YesAsia	2011	Best TV Dramas of 2011	3rd	
Nate	2012	Best Dramas of the Year	2nd	
Buzzfeed	2021	24 K-Dramas That Are Made Even Better By Their Fantastic Soundtracks	8th	
CBR	2022	10 Best K-Dramas About The K-Pop Industry	2nd	
FilmFare	2023	10 K-Dramas That Get Real About The Entertainment Industry	Placed	
Lifestyle Byte	2023	Top 20 Best Singing Shows	11th	

== Adaptations ==
- The drama was adapted into a Japanese stage musical, with Yuya Matsushita and Bright's Nanaka playing the roles of Song Sam-dong and Go Hye-mi, respectively. It had runs at the New National Theatre Tokyo from July 3 to July 20, 2012 and was produced by the "Dream High: Musical Production Committee" (ミュージカル「ドリームハイ」製作委員会), composed of TBS, Avex Live Creative, Nelke Planning and Lawson HMV Entertainment.
- After the publication of Dream High Special Making Book in February 2011 which contained behind-the-scene stories and photos as well as special interviews with the show's cast, a two-volume "image novel" was also released featuring still cuts from the drama.
- In episode 17 of My Love from the Star, Bae Suzy makes a special guest appearance as Go Hye-mi, the main protagonist (and the same character she plays in) of Dream High.
- On November 13, 2022, it was announced Dream High would be adapted into a Korean stage musical which will be opened in May 2023, the plot focusing on the lives of main characters 10 years after the series. On February 10, it was confirmed that choreographers Choi Young-jun from 1Million and Kim Hyo-jin from Artone (also the producing house of the musical) will be participating as choreography directors on the choreograph-heavy stage work. On February 28, it was confirmed that Eum Moon-suk, Winner's Lee Seung-hoon and SF9's Yoo Tae-yang will be playing the male lead, adult Song Sam-dong. Most of the main characters from the original series are reprised as adulthood characters in the adaptation, however only childhood and adolescent casts have been revealed for Go Hye-mi, the female lead in the series.
- In March 2025, it was announced that Dream High would be adapted into another stage musical, with Park Kyung-lim as creative director. The musical will be performed April 5 to June 1, 2025 simultaneously in both Korea and Japan. confirmed that Wonder Girls' Sunye and f(x)'s Luna will be appearing as Baek-hee, previously played by T-ara's Eunjung.

== Sequel ==
The sequel Dream High 2 aired a year later with a different cast, starring Kang So-ra, GOT7's JB and Jinyoung, 2AM's Jinwoon, T-ara's Jiyeon, SISTAR's Hyolyn, Ailee, and Park Seo-joon.

== Media release ==
In Japan, the series received a 2-Box Set DVD release on September 28, 2011 by Avex Japan, which were only available for purchase in the country. A commemorative event for the DVD release was held at the Saitama Super Arena on September 4, 2011, in which the majority of the cast attended to hold a joint concert and fan meeting. Due to the show's popularity and the success of the previous releases, additional 2 box sets were released on August 3, 2012 under the same distributor.

Another DVD box set featuring behind-the-scenes videos and interviews with the cast and staff was released on December 7 of the same year in Japan under Pony Canyon.

== International broadcast ==
Dream High is one of the best selling Korean dramas internationally, being licensed to over 35 channels in approximately 60 different countries. It received a worldwide broadcast on KBS World on April 27, 2021. It was also aired on MENA's largest network group MBC starting 25 August 2013 and received multiple re-runs since due to its popularity. In Europe, it premiered in Italy on September 2, 2013 on MTV and in 2017 on Lifetyle TV in Romania. The show was sold to various Latin American countries including Peru (2012), Ecuador (2012), Chile (2012, 2013, 2017), Panama (2013), Colombia (2013), Dominican Republic (2013), El Salvador (2013) and Bolivia (2014). It premiered in Indonesia on NET TV for the third time on January 17, 2022.

=== Streaming platform ===
Dream High has been licensed to multiple local and international streaming platforms since its release. Foreign releases were on American platforms DramaFever and Viki Rakuten as well as Viu, available in selected regions. It was released on Netflix on July 20, 2022.
