= House of the Disappeared =

2017 film directed by Lim Dae-woong

- Theatrical release poster
- Hangul: 시간위의 집
- RR: Siganwiui jip
- MR: Siganwiŭi chip
- Directed by: Lim Dae-woong
- Written by: Jang Jae-hyun
- Based on: The House at the End of Time
- Produced by: Park Sun-young
- Starring: Kim Yun-jin; Ok Taec-yeon; Jo Jae-yoon
- Cinematography: Park Jae-hong
- Edited by: Kim Woo-il
- Music by: Kim Woo-geun
- Production companies: Rhythmical Green; Zion Entertainment
- Distributed by: Little Big Pictures; Peppermint&Company
- Release date: April 5, 2017
- Running time: 100 minutes
- Country: South Korea
- Language: Korean
- Box office: $906,394

House of the Disappeared (Korean: 시간위의 집; RR: Siganwiui jip; lit. 'House Above Time') is a 2017 South Korean psychological horror film directed by Lim Dae-woong and written by Jang Jae-hyun. The film stars Kim Yun-jin, Ok Taec-yeon, and Jo Jae-yoon. It is a remake of the Venezuelan film The House at the End of Time.

== Premise ==
Falsely arrested for murdering her husband, a woman returns to the house where the incident occurred after 25 years of imprisonment to solve the mystery surrounding her husband's death and son's disappearance.

== Cast ==
- Yunjin Kim as Kang Mi-hee
- Ok Taec-yeon as Priest Choi
- Jo Jae-yoon as Chul-joong
- Park Sang-hoon as Hyo-je
- Go Woo-rim as Ji-won
- Hwang Joon-woo as Joon-ho (young Priest Choi)
- Kwak Ji-hye as Yeon-hee
- Woo Sang-jeon as Old Hyo-je
- Kim Min-jung as Old grandmother
- Kim Hyun as Previous house owner
- Yoo In-young as Adult Yeon-hee (cameo)
- Lee Han-wi as Geomancer Jang (special appearance)
- Park Joon-myun as Female shaman (special appearance)
- Baek Do-bin as Detective Im (special appearance)
- Lee Dong-kyu as Young general manager Park (special appearance)

== Production and release ==
Principal photography wrapped on December 15, 2016.

On March 24, 2017, sales company Finecut announced that House of the Disappeared was pre-sold to major Asian territories including Japan (New Select); Philippines (Viva Communications); Singapore, Malaysia, and Brunei (mm2 Entertainment); Taiwan (Long Shong International); and Vietnam (Red Pictures). The film was theatrically released in South Korea on April 5, 2017.

== Awards and nominations ==
Year	Award	Category	Recipient	Result
2017	Korean Film Shining Star Awards	Popularity Award	Ok Taec-yeon	Won
2017	Korean Film Shining Star Awards	Star Award	Kim Yun-jin	Won
2017	The Seoul Awards	Best Actress	Kim Yun-jin	Nominated
