= Joo (singer) =

South Korean singer (born 1990)

- 주
- Born: Jung A-rin; October 11, 1990 (age 36); Seoul, South Korea
- Other names: Jung Min-joo; Arin
- Education: Dongguk University
- Occupations: Singer; songwriter; actress
- Relatives: Jung Il-hoon (brother)
- Musical career
- Genres: K-pop; R&B; Ballad
- Instrument: Vocals
- Years active: 2008; 2011–present
- Labels: JYP; Woollim
- Website: officialjoo.com

Korean name
- Hangul: 정민주
- Hanja: 鄭慜珠
- RR: Jeong Minju
- MR: Chŏng Minju

Birth name
- Hangul: 정아린
- RR: Jeong Arin
- MR: Chŏng Arin

Jung Min-joo (Korean: 정민주; born October 11, 1990), born Jung A-rin and known professionally as Joo (stylized in all caps), is a South Korean singer, songwriter and musical actress. In 2006, she became a contestant on JYP Entertainment's Superstar Survival. Although she didn't win, she was accepted as a trainee at JYP Entertainment. After two years of training, Joo debuted as a soloist with her single album Young Girl in January 2008. However, she resumed training for two years, as she didn't feel ready for her debut. Joo later returned in January 2011 by releasing her EP Heartmade.

Aside from her music career, Joo has participated in various musical dramas, including Youthful March (2011–2012), Catch Me If You Can (2012–2013), and Full House (2014). She also participated in notable TV drama Dream High (2011) and the movie Marriage Blue (2013).

== Early life ==
Joo was born on October 11, 1990, in Seoul, South Korea. She spent her childhood in Indonesia because of her father's work. Her younger brother is Jung Il-hoon, a former member of the South Korean boy group BtoB.

== Career ==
=== Pre-debut ===
Joo was one of the contestants in the 2006 survival series Superstar Survival alongside 2PM's Chansung, Taecyeon and Junho. Although Junho was ultimately crowned the winner, she was accepted to train at JYP Entertainment.

=== 2008: Young Girl and return to trainee ===
On January 10, 2008, JYP Entertainment stated that they would debut a new solo singer, Joo. She made her debut stage on January 11, 2008, with her single "Young Girl" on KBS' Music Bank. Despite already making her debut, Joo ultimately decided that she was not yet ready to finish her training. She continued life as a trainee until her comeback in 2011.

=== 2011–2014: Heartmade and musical acting ===
On January 3, 2011, Joo released her much-awaited comeback video, titled "Bad Guy", which featured 2PM's Chansung on her official YouTube channel. The single was part of her album titled Heartmade. Her comeback stage featured the same song on the January 7 broadcast of Music Bank.

On May 12, 2011, Joo released another teaser video with a new song titled "Ice Cream" featuring Super Junior's leader, Leeteuk. The music video was released on May 16, 2011.

On May 23, 2011, JYP Entertainment officially announced that JYP artists would come together for two "JYP NATION in Japan 2011" concerts in Japan in August 2011. The star-studded line-up included Park Jin-young, Lim Jeong-hee, Wonder Girls, Joo, 2AM, 2PM, Miss A, and San E. The two concerts took place on August 17 and 18 at the Saitama Super Arena.

On October 10, 2011, JYP Entertainment revealed that Joo had been selected as a leading actress in a musical called Youthful March, scheduled to perform from November 12, 2011, to January 29, 2012. This marked her debut as a musical actress. As it was her first time in a musical, she said: "I'm excited to take my first step into the world of musicals. It's only the beginning, and as it is a leading role, I'll be rehearsing harder than anyone else to create an amazing show. I'll do my best to show a different image from singer Joo as musical actress Joo, so please give me your support.".

On October 31, 2012, JYP Entertainment announced that Joo had been selected to take on the role of Brenda in the new musical of Catch Me If You Can scheduled to have its first performance on December 14, 2012, and final on February 9, 2013. Other prominent stars such as Girls' Generation's Sunny, The Grace's Dana and Oh Sang-eun have taken turns to take on the role previously.

On March 5, 2014, it was announced that Joo was selected to join Beast's Yoseob in the musical remake of Full House, which ran from April 11, 2014, to June 8, 2014. She joined the cast of Full House, which included VIXX's Leo, Apink's Jung Eun-ji, Kim San-ho, Seo Ha-joon, and Kwak Sun-young.

Through an interview, she shared her thoughts and experiences on living as a musical actress, which is a career quite different than the one in her past. She said: "I've been enjoying performing for the musical Full House. I've been watching other musicals and taking lessons on my days off." She also revealed her hopes of wanting people who come to watch Full House to see her as Han Ji-eun, not as singer Joo or actress Jung Min-joo.

=== 2015–present: Cry & Blow, Late in the Morning, The Unit ===
In January 2015, Joo's contract with JYP Entertainment ended. In April, it was revealed that she had signed an exclusive contract with Woollim Entertainment.

In October 2015, Woollim Entertainment confirmed Joo would be making a comeback after five years, releasing a ballad track. Joo released her single, Cry & Blow, on November 2.

Joo release her second digital single Late in the Morning on May 26, 2017. The ballad track was composed by Nell's Lee Junghoon.

On October 2, 2017, Joo confirmed she would be appearing on reality television series The Unit and participated in a recording for the program on October 1, which aired on October 28.

== Personal life ==
Joo married her non-celebrity boyfriend from Taebaek on May 4, 2019, after dating for a year. Her younger brother, BTOB's Jung Il-hoon, was in attendance, as were his fellow members Yook Sung-jae, Im Hyun-sik, and Peniel Shin. The group reportedly performed "Only One For Me" as the congratulatory song.

== Discography ==
=== EPs ===
Title	Details	Peak chart positions	Sales
Title	Details	KOR	Sales
Heartmade	Released: January 3, 2011; Label: JYP Entertainment; Formats: CD, digital download; Track listing: 1. "나쁜 남자 (Bad Guy)"; 2. "물 한잔도 마실 수 없어 (Can't Even Take a Glass of Water)"; 3. "영화도 안보니 (Not Even in the Movies)" (feat. Chansung of 2PM); 4. "마주치고 나서 (After Looking At You)"; 5. "꿈만 같아 (Unbelievable)"; 6. "나쁜 남자 (Bad Guy)" (Inst.)	40	KOR: 2,287

=== Single album ===
Title	Details	Peak chart positions	Sales
Title	Details	KOR	Sales
Young Girl (어린 여자)	Released: January 10, 2008; Label: JYP Entertainment; Format: CD; Track listing: 1. "남자 때문에 (Because of a Man)"; 2. "어제처럼 (Like Yesterday)" (J.ae cover); 3. "얼굴 (Face)"; 4. "초연 (怊緣) (Premiere)"; 5. "남자 때문에 (Because of a Man)" (Inst.); 6. "어제처럼 (Like Yesterday)" (Inst.)	No data	KOR: 3,171

=== Singles ===
Title	Year	Peak chart positions	Sales	Album
Title	Year	KOR	Sales	Album
"Because of a Man" (남자 때문에)	2008	—	—N/a	Young Girl
"Like Yesterday" (어제처럼)	2008	—	—N/a	Young Girl
"Bad Guy" (나쁜 남자)	2011	5	—N/a	Heartmade
"Ice Cream" (아이스크림) (with Leeteuk)	2011	21	—N/a	Non-album singles
"Cry & Blow" (울고 분다)	2015	19	KOR: 73,569+	Non-album singles
"Late in the Morning" (어느 늦은 아침)	2017	—	—N/a	Non-album singles
"—" denotes songs that did not chart or were not released in that region.

=== Soundtrack appearances ===
Title	Year	Peak chart positions	Sales	Album
Title	Year	KOR	Sales	Album
"Premiere" (초연)	2007	—	—N/a	Conspiracy in the Court OST Young Girl
"That's Love" (그게 사랑이야)	2008	—	—N/a	One Mom and Three Dads OST
"Color" (색)	2008	—	—N/a	Painter of the Wind OST
"Turn Around" (뒤돌아봐)	2010	9	—N/a	Cinderella's Sister OST
"You Want It" (원하잖아) (San E feat. Joo)	2010	157	—N/a	Everybody Ready?
"Dream High" (with Suzy, Wooyoung, Taecyeon, Eunjung, and Kim Soo-hyun)	2011	42	—N/a	Dream High OST
"Not What I Expected" (기대했단 말야)	2012	—	—N/a	History of a Salaryman OST
"—" denotes releases that did not chart or were not released in that region.

=== Other charted songs ===
Title	Year	Peak chart positions	Sales	Album
Title	Year	KOR	Sales	Album
"Can't Even Take a Glass of Water" (물 한잔도 마실 수 없어)	2011	66	—N/a	Heartmade
"Not Even in the Movies" (영화도 안보니) (feat. Chansung of 2PM)	2011	95	—N/a	Heartmade
"After Looking At You" (마주치고 나서)	2011	117	—N/a	Heartmade
"Unbelievable" (꿈만 같아)	2011	123	—N/a	Heartmade
"—" denotes releases that did not chart or were not released in that region.

== Filmography ==
=== Film ===
Year	Title	Role	Notes
2013	Marriage Blue	Ah-reum	

=== Television series ===
Year	Title	Role	Network	Notes
2011	Dream High	Jung Ah-jung	KBS2	

=== Musical theatre ===
Year	Title	Role
2011–2012	Youthful March	Young-shim
2012–2013	Catch Me If You Can	Brenda
2014	Full House	Han Ji-eun

=== Music video appearances ===
Year	Title	Artist(s)	Role
2009	"A Friend's Confession"	2AM	Herself
2010	"This Christmas"	JYP Nation	Herself
2011	"Bad Guy"	Herself and Chansung of 2PM	Herself

== Awards and nominations ==
Year	Award-Giving Body	Category	Work	Result
2008	Mnet Asian Music Awards	Best New Female Artist	"Because of a Man"	Nominated
