= Taecyeon Special: Winter Hitori =

Taecyeon Special ～Winter Hitori～
- Regular edition cover

Studio album by Ok Taec-yeon
- Released: January 18, 2017
- Genre: J-pop
- Language: Japanese
- Label: Epic Records Japan

Singles from Taecyeon Special ～Winter Hitori～
- 1. "Winter Hitori (Winter 一人)" Released: December 27, 2016

Taecyeon Special: Winter Hitori or Taecyeon Special ～Winter Hitori～ is the debut Japanese album by South Korean artist Ok Taec-yeon of boy band 2PM. It was released on January 18, 2017.

== Background and release ==
On November 19, 2016, a 15-second preview of the music video for "Winter Hitori" (Winter 一人) was uploaded on 2PM Japan Official YouTube Channel. A special website announced Ok's debut Japanese studio album Taecyeon Special ～Winter Hitori～, as well as Ok's first solo concert, also titled Winter Hitori (Winter 一人), two days later. On December 5, 2016, the record label revealed the album's album covers and tracklist. A short music video for "Winter Hitori" was published on December 24, prior to its full release two weeks later. The single "Winter Hitori" was made available digitally on Ok's 28th birthday, December 27.

Ok held his first solo concerts, Winter Hitori, at the Tokyo Dome City Hall to promote the album on January 2–3, 2017. On January 5, the full music video for "Winter Hitori" was released.

The album was released on January 18, in three editions:

- Regular edition: CD
- Limited edition A: CD + DVD
- Limited edition B: CD + bonus tracks

== Track listing ==
CD
No.	Title	Lyrics	Music	Arrangements	Length
1.	"Winter Hitori" (Winter 一人)	Taecyeon aka TY, Raphael, Yu-ki Kokubo	Taecyeon aka TY, Raphael	Raphael	3:22
2.	"Don't Want To" (やりたくない; Yaritakunai)	Taecyeon aka TY, Raphael, Yhanael	Taecyeon aka TY, Raphael	Raphael	3:01
3.	"I Love You, You Love Me" (君だけじゃない; Kimidakejanai)	Taecyeon aka TY	Taecyeon aka TY	Jo Jong-su aka FAME-J, Taecyeon aka TY	3:49
4.	"Fight" (Rock ver.)	Taecyeon aka TY, Raphael, Joohyo, Risa Horie, Garfunkel	Taecyeon aka TY, Raphael, Joohyo	Frants	3:11
5.	"Toc Toc Toc"	Taecyeon aka TY, Raphael	Taecyeon aka TY, Raphael	Raphael	3:02
6.	"Traicion"	Taecyeon aka TY	Taecyeon aka TY	Geol	4:22
7.	"Move Your Body"	Taecyeon aka TY, Raphael	Taecyeon aka TY, Raphael	Raphael	3:41
8.	"Slender Man" (Taecyeon ver.)	Taecyeon aka TY, Kim Seung-soo, Song Ji-wook, Ryan Im, Yu Shimoji	Taecyeon aka TY, Kim Seung-soo, Song Ji-wook, Ryan Im	Taecyeon aka TY, Kim Seung-soo, Song Ji-wook, Ryan Im	3:19
9.	"Don't Forget" (Taecyeon ver.) (忘れないで; Wasurenaide)	Taecyeon aka TY, Raphael, Risa Horie	Taecyeon aka TY, Raphael	Raphael	4:00
10.	"Teaser" (Taecyeon ver.)	Taecyeon aka TY, Raphael, kenko-p	Taecyeon aka TY, Raphael	Raphael	3:38
Total length:					35:12

DVD (limited edition ver. A)
No.	Title	Length
1.	"Winter 一人" (music video)
2.	"Winter 一人" (making movie)

Bonus tracks (limited edition ver. B)
No.	Title	Lyrics	Music	Arrangements	Length
11.	"Not Only You" (君だけじゃない; Kimidakejanai)	Taecyeon aka TY, Raphael	Taecyeon aka TY, Raphael	Raphael	3:45
12.	"I Love You, You Love Me" (Rock Ver.) (君だけじゃない; Kimidakejanai)	Taecyeon aka TY	Taecyeon aka TY	Frants	3:33
13.	"Promise (I'll Be)" (Taecyeon ver.)	Taecyeon aka TY, Lesley Chiang, Raphael	Taecyeon aka TY, Lesley Chiang, Raphael	Raphael	3:28

== Sales ==
Chart	Amount
Oricon	39,896+
Billboard Japan	38,973+

== Charts ==
	Chart	Peak position
Oricon	Daily Album Chart	3
Oricon	Weekly Album Chart	3
Oricon	Monthly Album Chart	15
Billboard Japan	Hot Albums	5
Billboard Japan	Top Albums Sales	3

== Release history ==
Country	Date	Format	Label
Japan	January 18, 2017	CD, Digital download	Epic Records Japan
