= Seoul International Drama Awards =

South Korean television drama awards

- Awarded for: Excellence in television drama productions
- Location: Seoul
- Country: South Korea
- Presented by: Seoul Drama Awards Organizing Committee; Korean Broadcasters Association
- First award: 2006; 20 years ago
- Website: http://www.seouldrama.org

Television/radio coverage
- Network: KBS2

Seoul International Drama Awards (Korean: 서울 국제 드라마 어워즈), simply known as SDA, is an annual award ceremony based in Seoul, South Korea which honors excellence in television drama productions worldwide.

== Ceremonies ==
Edition	Year	Date	Venue	Host	Ref.
16th	2021	October 21, 2021	MBC Hall, Sangam-dong	Cha Eun-woo and Park Eun-bin	
17th	2022	September 22, 2022	KBS Hall, Yeouido	Joo Sang-wook and Jung Eun-ji	
18th	2023	September 21, 2023	KBS Hall, Yeouido	Jun Hyun-moo and Lee Se-young	
19th	2024	September 25, 2024	KBS Hall, Yeouido	Bae Sung-jae and Seol In-ah	
20th	2025	October 2, 2025	KBS Hall, Yeouido	Ok Taec-yeon and Jang Do-yeon	
21st	2026	October 8, 2026	KBS Hall, Yeouido	Kim Nam-gil and Lee Jae-eun	

== Winners ==
=== Golden Bird Prize ===
Year	Recipient	Notes	Ref.
2023	Big Bet (Program) (South Korea)	The Golden Bird Prize is a new award given by the organizing committee recognizing works and individuals that have made a mark in the drama industry by achieving success in both artistic value and popularity among popular works from around the world.	
2023	Choi Min-sik (Individual) (Big Bet - South Korea)	The Golden Bird Prize is a new award given by the organizing committee recognizing works and individuals that have made a mark in the drama industry by achieving success in both artistic value and popularity among popular works from around the world.	
2024	Park Chan-wook (The Sympathizer - U.S.)	The Golden Bird Prize is given by the organizing committee recognizing works and individuals that have made a mark in the drama industry.	
2025	Ben Stiller (Severance - U.S.)	The Golden Bird Prize is given by the organizing committee recognizing creative and outstanding direction of presenting works that deepen understanding of humanity and inspire reflection on the path toward harmony.	

=== Grand prize (Daesang) ===
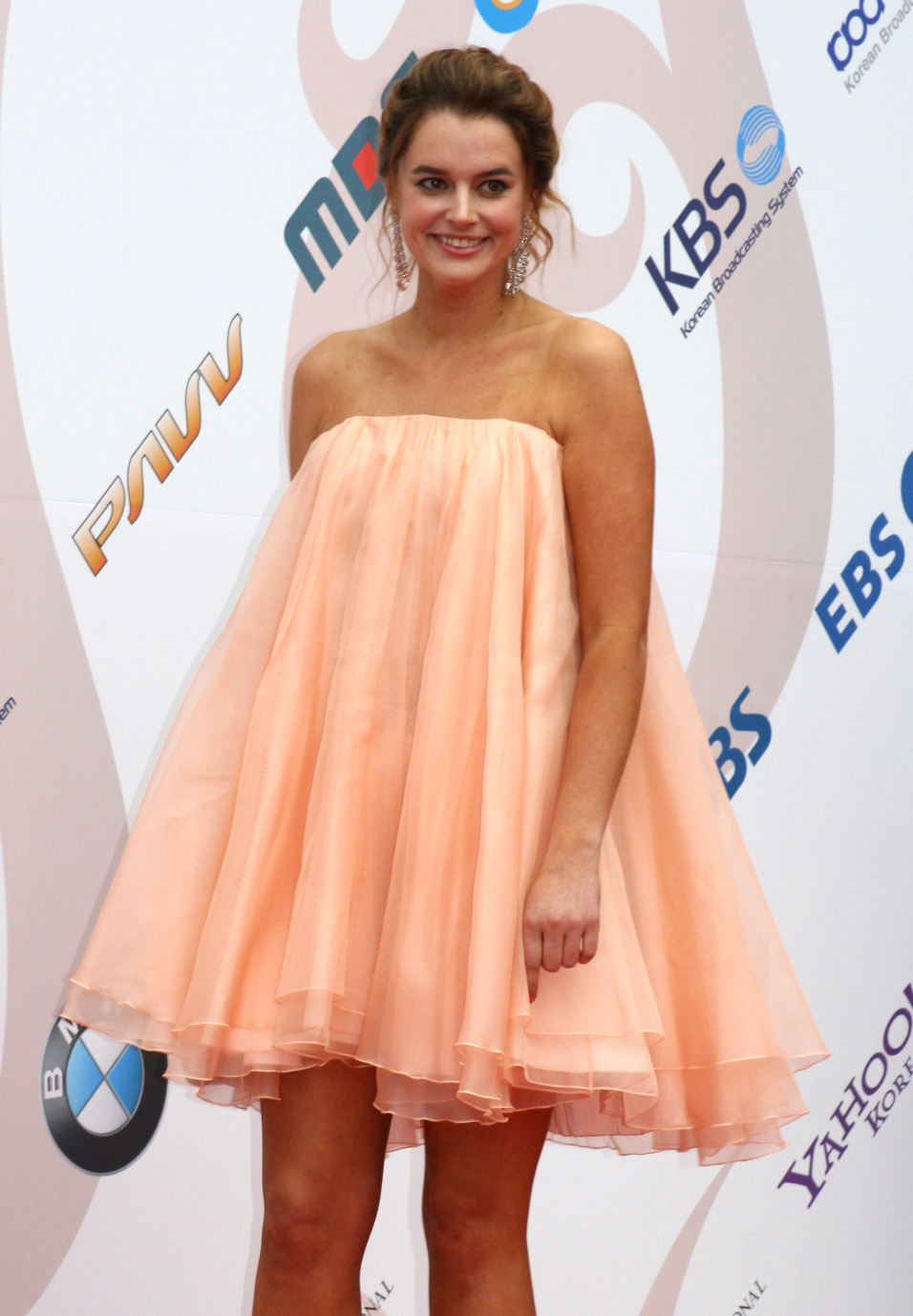
Norwegian actress Charlotte Frogner attending Seoul International Drama Awards in 2009

Year	Grand Prize	Ref.
2008	Missing (Spain)	
2009	Memoirs in China (China)	
2010	Shoe-shine Boy (Japan)	
2011	Three Kingdoms (China)	
2012	Deep Rooted Tree (South Korea)	
2013	Prisoners of War (Israel)	
2014	Kaboul Kitchen (France)	
2015	Naked Among Wolves (Germany)	
2016	The Night Manager (U.K.)	
2017	This Is Us (U.S.)	
2018	Babylon Berlin (Germany)	
2019	On the Spectrum (Israel)	
2020	Orphans of a Nation (Brazil)	
2021	Missing Child (South Korea)	
2022	Help (U.K.)	
2023	The Fragile Colossus (France)	
2024	Justice: Misconduct (Brazil)	
2025	Adolescence (U.K.)	

=== Program ===
Year	Best TV Movie	Best Mini-series	Best Series Drama	Best Juvenile Series	Best Comedy	Special Prize	Jury Special Prize	Ref.
2006	The Violin (Japan); Runner-up: What Shall We Expect Tomorrow? (Netherlands)	My Lovely Sam Soon (South Korea); Runner-up: Watch for the Happiness (China); Runner-up: Crying Out Love, in the Center of the World (Japan)	Qiao's Grand Courtyard (China); Runner-up: Emperor of the Sea (South Korea)	—N/a	—N/a	—N/a	Holed Slipper for Hamdani (Indonesia); Bird, Bird (South Korea); White Walls (Israel)	
2007	A Dwarf Launches a Little Ball (South Korea); Runner-up: Prime Suspect: The Final Act (U.K.)	Nodame Cantabile (Japan); Runner-up: The Tudors (U.S.)	The Great Revival (China); Runner-up: Remember When (Spain)	Mortified (Australia); Runner-up: Jump 2 (South Korea)	—N/a	The Iron Handed Phantom - Mayavi (India); Runner-up: KHALA Word of Honor (Jordan); Runner-up: Memories - Jail Bars (Philippines)	Can (Germany)	
2008	Devastation (France); Runner-up: Kobra's Decision (Iran)	Ella Blue (South Africa); Runner-up: Skins (U.K.)	Hero Without a Name (China); Runner-up: Golden Bride (South Korea)	Jungle Fish (South Korea); Runner-up: Ballet Shoes (U.K.)	—N/a	The Tutor (Israel); Runner-up: Secrets of This House (Afghanistan)	—N/a	
2009	The Englishman's Boy (Canada); Runner-up: The Shopping Trip (Japan)	Maria (Norway); Runner-up: Beethoven Virus (South Korea)	The Slingshot (South Korea); Runner-up: The Cartel (Colombia)	—N/a	—N/a	Token (Iran); Fighting Spiders (Singapore); Eva Fonda (Philippines)	Taipei 24H (Taiwan); Live a Luxurious and Dissipated Life (China)	
2010	The Summit (Canada); Runner-up: The Day of the Triffids (U.K.)	The Slave Hunters (South Korea); Runner-up: Jin (Japan)	Queen Seondeok (South Korea); Runner-up: Murdoch Mysteries (season 3) (Canada)	—N/a	—N/a	Ghost (season 2) (Malaysia); Pavitra Rishta (India); Where's Elisa? (Philippines)	Yeh Rishta Kya Kehlata Hai (India)	
2011	Shades of Happiness (Germany); Runner-up: When Harvey Met Bob (Ireland)	Luther (U.K.); Runner-up: The Pillars of the Earth (Germany)	In the Name of Honour (Romania); Runner-up: Passione (Brazil)	—N/a	—N/a	Eagle Four (Afghanistan); The Amazing Extraordinary Friends (season 5) (New Zealand); The Dandelion (Russia)	—N/a	
2012	Homevideo (Germany); Runner-up: Calm at Sea (France)	Great Expectations (U.K.); Runner-up: Sherlock (series 2) (U.K.)	The Princess' Man (South Korea); Runner-up: The Firm (Canada)	—N/a	—N/a	Memories - Fist (Philippines); Ezel (Turkey); The Bomber (Ukraine)	—N/a	
2013	The Jewish Cardinal (France); Runner-up: Welcome and...Our Condolences (Israel)	Generation War (Germany); Runner-up: The Half Brother (Norway)	Gran Hotel (season 2) (Spain); Runner-up: The Chaser (South Korea)	—N/a	—N/a	The Perfect Day (South Korea); Salam, New York! (Kyrgyzstan)	Yeh Rishta Kya Kehlata Hai (India)	
2014	Barefoot on Red Soil (Spain); Runner-up: The Fat & The Angry (Sweden)	Mammon (Norway); Runner-up: Good Doctor (South Korea)	Empress Ki (South Korea); Runner-up: The Tide (Turkey)	—N/a	—N/a	Baby Cans (Sri Lanka); Galileo (season 2) (Japan)	—N/a	
2015	The Good Sister (Canada)	Misaeng: Incomplete Life (South Korea)	Jikulumessu - Open Your Eyes (Angola)	—N/a	—N/a	—N/a	Deng Xiaoping at History's Crossroads (China); Home Away from Home (Taiwan); The American Letters (Czech Republic)	
2016	Don't Leave Me (France); Runner-up: Sabena Hijacking: My Version (Israel)	Deutschland 83 (Germany); Runner-up: Mr. Robot (U.S.)	Six Flying Dragons (South Korea); Runner-up: A Scholar Dream of Woman (China)	—N/a	Baskets (U.S.)	—N/a	Journey (Australia); Endless Love (Turkey)	
2017	Redemption Road (Germany); Runner-up: Red Teacher (South Korea)	Please, Love Me (Belgium); Runner-up: Deep Water (Australia)	The Slave Mother (Brazil); Runner-up: Brave and Beautiful (Turkey)	—N/a	Fleabag (U.K.)	—N/a	We Are One (Taiwan); P.O.W – Bandi Yudh Ke (India)	
2018	54 Hours (Germany); Runner-up: Crocodile (England)	Mother (South Korea); Runner-up: Safe Harbour (Australia)	Candice Renoir (France); Runner-up: Filthy Rich (New Zealand)	—N/a	The New Black (Israel)	—N/a	The Memoir of Majie (Malaysia)	
2019	Billy (Netherlands); Runner-up: Bauhaus (Germany)	The Little Drummer Girl (U.K.); Runner-up: Invisible Heroes (Finland)	The Golden Eyes (China); Runner-up: Crash (Turkey)	—N/a	—N/a	—N/a	Breasts (Montenegro); The Herd (South Africa)	
2020	The Turncoat (Germany); Runner-up: Everything and Nothing (South Korea)	World on Fire (U.K.); Runner-up: Itaewon Class (South Korea)	Bolívar (Colombia); Runner-up: Mr. Fighting (China)	—N/a	—N/a	—N/a	The Cage (Czech Republic); XX (South Korea)	
2021	Federica Montseny, the Woman Who Speaks (Spain); Runner-up: This House Is Mine (Germany)	The Investigation (Denmark); Runner-up: The Bad Kids (China)	The Penthouse: War in Life (South Korea); Runner-up: Go Ahead (China)	—N/a	—N/a	—N/a	Bonus Vacation (Malaysia); Atlantic Crossing (Norway); The Pit season 4 (Turkey)	
2022	Nobody's Child (France); Take Me Home (Germany)	Last Summers of the Raspberries (Canada); Anne (U.K.)	Hidden Truth (Turkey); Destan (Turkey)	—N/a	—N/a	—N/a	The World Stands Still (Germany)	
2023	Mayflies (U.K.); Belascoarán, PI (Mexico)	The Long Season (China); Reborn Rich (South Korea)	Meet Yourself (China); Act Like You're Asleep (Greece)	—N/a	—N/a	—N/a	Cammo (Norway)	
2024	The Saint (Czech Republic); Bruised Like A Peach (South Korea)	3 Body Problem (U.S.); Cigarette Girl (Indonesia)	Korea–Khitan War (South Korea); Another Love (Turkey)	—N/a	—N/a	—N/a	Eye Love You (Japan)	
2025	The Son (South Korea)	Pachinko (U.S.)	The Good & The Bad (Turkey)	—N/a	—N/a	—N/a	—N/a	

=== Individual ===
Year	Best Actor	Best Actress	Best Director	Best Screenwriter	Best Cinematographer	Best Music Director	Best Art Director	Ref.
2006	Michael Therriault (Prairie Giant - Canada)	Lu Yuan (Watch for the Happiness - China)	Akihiko Ishimaru (Crying out Love, in the Center of the World - Japan)	Patrick Bucley (Family Portrait - Spain)	Kim Seung-hwan (Emperor of the Sea - South Korea)	Taro Iwashiro (The Violin - Japan)	Min Eon-ok (Princess Hours - South Korea)	
2007	Takuya Kimura (The Grand Family - Japan)	Helen Mirren (Prime Suspect: The Final Act - U.K.)	Takeuchi Hideki (Nodame Cantabile - Japan)	Frank Deasy (Prime Suspect: The Final Act - U.K.)	Shi Luan (The Great Revival - China)	Takeuchi Hideki (Nodame Cantabile - Japan)	Lee Cheol-ho (Hwang Jini - South Korea)	
2008	Dvir Benedek (The Tutor - Israel)	Pan Li-li (Artemisia - Taiwan)	Carlos Sedes, Manuel Palacios (Missing - Spain)	Gao Mantang, Sun Jianye (Chuang Guandong - China)	Piotr Wojtowicz (Let's Go to the Movies Tomorrow - Poland)	Braam du Toit, Ronelle Loots (Ella Blue - South Africa)	Huo Wan (Hero Without a Name - China)	
2009	Akira Kume (The Shopping Trip - Japan)	Charlotte Frogner (Maria - Norway)	Duane Clark (XIII: The Conspiracy - U.K.)	Marc Didden (The Emperor of Taste - Belgium)	—N/a	—N/a	—N/a	
2010	Carl-Kristian Rundman (Easy Living - Finland)	Margôt Ros, Maike Meijer (Tower C - Netherlands)	Nick Copus (The Summit - Canada)	Craig Warner (The Last Days of Lehman Brothers - U.K.)	—N/a	—N/a	—N/a	
2011	Chen Jianbin (Three Kingdoms - China)	Na Moon-hee (It's Me, Grandma - South Korea)	Miguel Alexandre (Shades of Happiness - Germany)	Albert Espinosa (The Red Band Society - Spain)	—N/a	—N/a	—N/a	
2012	Jonas Nay (Homevideo - Germany)	Christine Neubauer (Hanna's Decision - Germany)	Brian Kirk (Great Expectations - U.K.)	Sarah Phelps (Great Expectations - U.K.)	—N/a	—N/a	—N/a	
2013	Lee Moon-sik (Sangkwoni (Business District) - South Korea)	Lucy Liu (Elementary - U.S.)	Philipp Kadelbach (Generation War - Germany)	Lars Lundström (Real Humans - Sweden)	—N/a	—N/a	—N/a	
2014	Edgar Selge (A Blind Hero - The Love of Otto Weidt - Germany)	Kim Hee-ae (Secret Affair - South Korea)	Cecilie Mosli (Mammon - Norway)	María Jaén (Barefoot on Red Soil - Spain)	—N/a	—N/a	—N/a	
2015	Engin Akyürek (Black Money Love - Turkey)	Simona Stašová (The Self Lover - Czech Republic)	—N/a	—N/a	—N/a	—N/a	—N/a	
2016	Azat Seitmetov (Father - Kazakhstan)	Samia Sassi (Don't Leave Me - France)	Susanne Bier (The Night Manager - U.K.)	Eva Spreitzhofer (Little Big Voice - Austria)	—N/a	—N/a	—N/a	
2017	Kerem Bürsin (Heart of the City - Turkey)	Alexandra Nikiforova (Anna Detective - Russia)	Urs Egger (Gotthard - Switzerland)	Rodica Doehnert (Das Sacher - Austria)	—N/a	—N/a	—N/a	
2018	Joan Pera (The Power of Silence - Spain)	Lee Bo-young (Mother - South Korea)	Kilian Riedhof (54 Hours - Germany)	Uli Bree, Klaus Pieber (A Dance to Remembrance - Austria)	—N/a	—N/a	—N/a	
2019	Kim Dong-wook (Special Labor Inspector - South Korea)	Alicia von Rittberg (Bauhaus - Germany)	Christophe Charrier (Jonas - France)	Jed Mercurio (Bodyguard - U.K.)	—N/a	—N/a	—N/a	
2020	Waleed Zuaiter (Baghdad Central - U.S.)	Gong Hyo-jin (When the Camellia Blooms - South Korea)	Adam Smith (World on Fire - U.K.)	Lim Sang-choon (When the Camellia Blooms - South Korea)	—N/a	—N/a	—N/a	
2021	Park Hyuk-kwon (Missing Child - South Korea)	Elle Fanning (The Great - U.S.)	Cho Yong-won (Missing Child - South Korea)	Russell T Davies (It's a Sin - U.K.)	—N/a	—N/a	—N/a	
2022	Stephen Graham (Help - U.K.)	Jodie Comer (Help - U.K.)	Akim Isker (Nobody's Child (L'enfant de personne - France)	Han Hee-jung (The King's Affection - South Korea)	—N/a	—N/a	—N/a	
2023	Wei Fan (The Long Season - China)	Nina Ellen Ødegård (Afterglow - Norway); Bae Suzy (Anna - South Korea)	Stéphanie Murat (The Fragile Colossus - France)	Aude Marcle (The Fragile Colossus - France); Nima Javidi (Actor - Iran)	—N/a	—N/a	—N/a	
2024	Song Kang-ho (Uncle Samsik - South Korea)	Jiřina Bohdalová (The Saint - Czech Republic)	Park In-je (Moving - South Korea)	David Benioff, D. B. Weiss, and Alexander Woo (3 Body Problem - U.S.)	—N/a	—N/a	—N/a	
2025	Owen Cooper (Adolescence - United Kingdom)	Cate Blanchett (Disclaimer - U.S.); Kim Min-ha (Pachinko - U.S.)	Hirokazu Kore-eda (Asura - Japan); Philip Barantini (Adolescence - United Kingdom)	Dan Erickson (Severance - U.S.)	—N/a	—N/a	—N/a	

=== Outstanding Korean Drama ===
Year	Grand Prize	Top Excellence Award	Excellence Award	Outstanding Asian Star (Male)	Outstanding Asian Star (Female)	Best Director	Best Screenwriter	Best Original Soundtrack (OST)	Ref.
2010	The Slave Hunters	—N/a	—N/a	Jang Hyuk (The Slave Hunters); Lee Byung-hun (IRIS)	Go Hyun-jung (Queen Seondeok); Han Hyo-joo (Brilliant Legacy)	Kwak Jung-hwan (The Slave Hunters)	Kim Young-hyun and Park Sang-yeon (Queen Seondeok)	—N/a	
2011	—N/a	Marry Me, Mary!	Sungkyunkwan Scandal	Park Yoochun (Sungkyunkwan Scandal)	Moon Geun-young (Marry Me, Mary!)	Shin Woo-chul (Secret Garden)	Kim Eun-sook (Secret Garden)	Baek Ji-young – "That Woman" (Secret Garden)	
2012	—N/a	Rooftop Prince	The King 2 Hearts	Park Yoochun (Rooftop Prince)	Han Ji-min (Rooftop Prince)	—N/a	—N/a	Taeyeon – "Missing You Like Crazy" (The King 2 Hearts)	
2013	—N/a	Arang and the Magistrate	King of Ambition	Lee Joon-gi (Arang and the Magistrate)	Bae Suzy (Gu Family Book)	—N/a	—N/a	Kim Jaejoong – "Living Like a Dream" (Dr. Jin)	
2014	—N/a	My Love from the Star	The Heirs	Kim Soo-hyun (My Love from the Star)	Kim Hee-ae (Secret Affair)	—N/a	—N/a	Lyn – "My Destiny" (My Love from the Star)	
2015	—N/a	Kill Me, Heal Me	Gunman in Joseon; Pinocchio	Lee Joon-gi (Gunman in Joseon)	Hwang Jung-eum (Kill Me, Heal Me)	—N/a	—N/a	Taeyeon – "Love, That One Word" (You're All Surrounded)	
2016	—N/a	Descendants of the Sun	The Flower in Prison	Song Joong-ki (Descendants of the Sun)	Shin Min-a (Oh My Venus)	—N/a	—N/a	Gummy – "You Are My Everything" (Descendants of the Sun)	
2017	—N/a	Love in the Moonlight	W; The Doctors	Park Bo-gum (Love in the Moonlight)	Park Bo-young (Strong Girl Bong-soon)	—N/a	—N/a	Ailee – "I Will Go to You Like the First Snow" (Guardian: The Lonely and Great God)	
2018	—N/a	While You Were Sleeping	Fight for My Way; Something in the Rain	Park Seo-joon (Fight for My Way)	Son Ye-jin (Something in the Rain)	—N/a	—N/a	—N/a	
2019	—N/a	The Fiery Priest	Doctor Prisoner	Kim Nam-gil (The Fiery Priest)	Jang Na-ra (The Last Empress)	—N/a	—N/a	Davichi – "Falling In Love" (The Beauty Inside)	
2020	—N/a	When the Camellia Blooms	Crash Landing on You; Hot Stove League; Extraordinary You	Kang Ha-neul (When the Camellia Blooms)	Son Ye-jin (Crash Landing on You)	—N/a	—N/a	Punch – "Like a Heroine in the Movie" (When the Camellia Blooms)	
2021	—N/a	Vincenzo	Start-Up; Taxi Driver; Kairos	Song Joong-ki (Vincenzo)	Bae Suzy (Start-Up)	—N/a	—N/a	Young Tak – "Okay" (Revolutionary Sisters)	
2022	—N/a	—N/a	The Red Sleeve; All of Us Are Dead	Kim Seon-ho (Hometown Cha-Cha-Cha)	Jisoo (Snowdrop)	—N/a	—N/a	Lim Young-woong – "Love Always Runs Away" (Young Lady and Gentleman)	
2023	—N/a	—N/a	Extraordinary Attorney Woo; The Glory	Lee Seung-min (Reborn Rich)	Park Eun-bin (Extraordinary Attorney Woo)	—N/a	—N/a	Kim Ho-joong – "Meet You Among Them" (Three Bold Siblings)	
2024	—N/a	—N/a	Moving; Queen of Tears	Ahn Jae-hong (Mask Girl)	Yeom Hye-ran (Mask Girl)	—N/a	—N/a	BSS – "The Reasons of My Smiles" (Queen of Tears)	
2025	—N/a	—N/a	The Trauma Code: Heroes on Call; When Life Gives You Tangerines	Ju Ji-hoon (The Trauma Code: Heroes on Call)	IU (When Life Gives You Tangerines)	—N/a	—N/a	Young Tak – "Unpredictable Life" (For Eagle Brothers)	

=== People's choice ===
Year	Most Popular Foreign Drama of the Year	Popular Drama	Popular Actor	Popular Actress	Ref.
2008	—N/a	Time Between Dog and Wolf (South Korea)	Lee Joon-gi (Time Between Dog and Wolf - South Korea)	Nam Sang-mi (Time Between Dog and Wolf - South Korea)	
2009	CSI (U.S.); Doctor Who (series 4) (U.K.)	Boys Over Flowers (South Korea)	Kim Hyun-joong (Boys Over Flowers - South Korea)	Moon Geun-young (Painter of the Wind - South Korea)	
2010	NCIS (season 7) (U.S.)	—N/a	Lee Seung-gi (Brilliant Legacy - South Korea)	Ruby Lin (Beauty's Rival in Palace - Taiwan); Charmaine Sheh (Beyond the Realm of Conscience - Hong Kong)	
2011	The Walking Dead (U.S.)	—N/a	Park Yoochun (Sungkyunkwan Scandal - South Korea); Ryunosuke Kamiki (Threads of Our Hearts - Japan); Yu Xiaotong (The Dream of Red Mansions - China)	Jian Man-shu (Where the Rain Never Stops - Taiwan); Charmaine Sheh (Can't Buy Me Love - Hong Kong)	
2012	Scarlet Heart (China)	—N/a	Park Yoochun (Rooftop Prince - South Korea); Nicky Wu (Taiwan) (Scarlet Heart - China)	Aoi Miyazaki (Lady Butterfly - Daughter of a Samurai - Japan); Wang Ding-zhu (Days We Stared at the Sun - Taiwan)	
2013	Mistresses (U.S.)	—N/a	Jung Yunho (King of Ambition - South Korea); Nicky Wu (Taiwan) (Chinese Detective - China); Renn Kiriyama (Switch Girl!! (season 2) - Japan)	Ya-chi Hsu (Are You Christine? - Taiwan)	
2014	Sherlock (series 3) (U.K.)	—N/a	Kim Soo-hyun (My Love from the Star - South Korea); Joe Cheng (Love Actually - Taiwan); Hu Ge (Life Revelation - China)	—N/a	

=== Special awards ===
Year	Category	Recipient	Notes	Ref.
2008	Star Hall of Fame	Choi Bool-am		
2009	Star Hall of Fame	Choi Ji-woo		
2015	New Trend Award	Marco Polo (U.S.); Chosen (season 3) (U.S.)		
2015	Asia Star Grand Award	Joe Odagiri (Japan); Wallace Chung (China); Ariel Lin and Chen Bolin (Taiwan)	Awardees were selected through the Jury and committee.	
2015	Asia Star Award	Hans Zhang (China); Aaron Yan (Taiwan); Ryunosuke Kamiki (Japan)	Awardees were selected through the Jury and committee.	
2015	Mango TV Popularity Award	Lee Min-ho, Choo Ja-hyun, and The One (South Korea)		
2015	10th Anniversary Hallyu Achievement Award	Lee Young-ae; Lee Byung-hoon; Lee Min-ho		
2015	Special Invitation	Midnight Diner (season 3) (Japan)		
2016	Most Popular Foreign Drama of the Year	Dramaworld (U.S.)		
2016	Asia Star Award	Anthony Wong (Hong Kong); Dennis Trillo (Philippines); Jasper Liu (Taiwan); Rebecca Lim (Singapore); Mina Fujii (Japan); Nhã Phương (Vietnam)	Awardees were selected through the Jury and committee.	
2017	Most Popular Foreign Drama of the Year	Mozart in the Jungle (season 3) (U.S.)		
2017	Asia Star Award	Debbie Goh (Malaysia); Hyunri (Japan); Satyadeep Mishra (India); Sukollawat Kanaros (Thailand); Gabby Concepcion (Philippines)	Awardees were selected through the Jury and committee.	
2018	Asia Star Award	Ryohei Otani (Japan); Tatjana Saphira (Indonesia)		
2018	Special Invitation	Special Gourmet (Japan)		
2019	Most Popular Foreign Drama of the Year	Kim's Convenience (season 3) (Canada); The Good Doctor (U.S.); Ashes of Love (China)		
2019	Asian Star Prize	Vivian Sung (Taiwan); Haruma Miura (Japan); Yao Xingtong (China); Alden Richards (Philippines); Trương Ngọc Ánh (Vietnam)	Awardees were selected through the Jury and committee.	
2020	Most Popular Foreign Drama of the Year	Snowpiercer (U.S.); Descendants of the Sun (Philippines); The New Pope (Italy)		
2020	Golden Bird Prize for Best Short-form Drama	18h30 (France)		
2020	Asian Star Prize	Dingdong Dantes (Philippines); Ryusei Yokohama (Japan)	Awardees were selected through the Jury and committee.	
2021	Most Popular Foreign Drama of the Year	I Told Sunset About You (Thailand); Signal (Japan)		
2021	Short-form Drama	Golden Bird Prize: Passengers (Russia); Silver Bird Prize: Delete Me (Norway)	Awardees were selected through the Jury and committee.	
2021	Asian Star Prize	Marcus Chang (Taiwan); Kentaro Sakaguchi (Japan); Zhao Lusi (China); Krit Amnuaydechkorn (Thailand); Amanda Manopo (Indonesia)	Awardees were selected through the Jury and committee.	
2021	Character of the Year	Ahn Eun-young (Jung Yu-mi); Han Ji-pyeong (Kim Seon-ho); Cha Hyun-soo (Song Kang)		
2022	Asian Star Prize	Kang Daniel (South Korea); Wallace Chung (China); Yusei Yagi (Japan); Belle Mariano (Philippines); Alice Ko (Taiwan); Krit Amnuaydechkorn (Thailand)	Awardees for 2022 were determined through fan votes and online voting.	
2022	Seoul Business Agency Prize	Our Beloved Summer		
2023	Asian Star Prize	Kathryn Bernardo (2 Good 2 Be True - Philippines); Park Eun-bin (Extraordinary Attorney Woo - South Korea); Atthaphan Phunsawat (Midnight Museum - Thailand); Luo Yunxi (Till The End Of The Moon - China); Yusei Yagi (My Beautiful Man Season 2 - Japan)	Awardees were determined through fan votes and online voting.	
2023	Idol Champ Artist Award	Park Sung-hoon (Mimicus - South Korea)	Awardees were determined through fan votes and online voting.	

== See also ==
- List of Asian television awards
- Shanghai Television Festival
- International Drama Festival in Tokyo
