= 16th Seoul International Drama Awards =

Award ceremony in 2021

- Date: 21 October 2021
- Location: MBC Hall, Sangam-dong, Seoul
- Presented by: Seoul Drama Awards Organizing Committee; Korean Broadcasters Association
- Hosted by: Cha Eun-woo; Park Eun-bin

Highlights
- Most awards: Missing Child (South Korea - 3 awards)
- Grand Prize (Daesang): Missing Child (South Korea)
- Golden Bird Prize for Best Series Drama: The Penthouse: War in Life (South Korea)
- Golden Bird Prize for Best Mini-Series: The Investigation (Denmark)
- Golden Bird Prize for Best TV Movie: Federica Montseny, the Woman Who Speaks (Spain)

Television/radio coverage
- Network: MBC

The 16th Annual Seoul International Drama Awards (Korean: 제16회 서울 드라마 어워즈) festival was held on 20–22 October 2021 at MBC Hall, Sangam-dong, Seoul. 238 works from 41 countries vied for awards in this edition.

The awards ceremony took place online on 21 October without spectators and non-face-to-face, hosted by Park Eun-bin and Astro member Cha Eun-woo. It was broadcast live through MBC and YouTube channel.

Those who have been vaccinated against COVID-19 and some of the winners from home and abroad attended this year's awards ceremony as per safety rules for COVID-19.

== Juries ==
International competition
| Program category | Grand Prize | |
| Program category | Best TV Movie | Up to 2 awards for each category through preliminary and final selection. |
| Program category | Best Mini Series | Up to 2 awards for each category through preliminary and final selection. |
| Program category | Best Serial Drama | Up to 2 awards for each category through preliminary and final selection. |
| Individual category | Best Director | 1 award for each category through preliminary and final selection. |
| Individual category | Best Screenwriter | 1 award for each category through preliminary and final selection. |
| Individual category | Best Actor | 1 award for each category through preliminary and final selection. |
| Individual category | Best Actress | 1 award for each category through preliminary and final selection. |
| Jury's Special Prize | | Up to 3 awards selected by the organizing committee among recommendations by the jury. |

International Invitation
| Individual category | Outstanding Asian Star | Up to 5 popular actor and actress from Asian countries. |

Korean (Hallyu) Drama
| Program category | Outstanding Korean Drama | Up to 3 Korean dramas that contributed to the development of the Korean Wave. |
| Individual category | Outstanding Korean Actor | 2 people by male and female among actors who appeared in a Korean drama. |
| Individual category | Outstanding Korean Actress | 2 people by male and female among actors who appeared in a Korean drama. |
| Individual category | Outstanding Korean OST | 1 person who sang a soundtrack in a Korean drama. |

=== Final selection ===
These are the juries who selected the program and individual to win each category.

- Ko Suk-man (South Korea), former President of Educational Broadcasting System
- Sohn Byung-woo (South Korea), Professor of Department of Communication, Chungnam National University
- Akiko Amy Kanda (Japan), Producer of TV Asahi Scripted Production Department
- Magdalene Ew (Singapore), Head of Content – WarnerMedia Entertainment Networks Asia Pacific
- Isabelle Degeorges (France), Gaumont Television director
- Ana Carolina Lima (Brazil), Globoplay Head of Content
- You Xiao Gang (China), Chairman of China Television Drama Production Industry Association

=== Preliminary screening ===
These are the juries who selected the program and individual to qualify for the final selection.

- Rebecca Chiyoko King-O'Riain (Ireland), Associate Professor in Department of Sociology Maynooth University
- Tan Wei Lin (Singapore), vice-president of English drama production – MediaCorp
- Stephen Corvini (Australia), Live Wires Productions founder/executive producer
- Jason Bechervaise (U.K.), Film critic/Professor of Soongsil Cyber University

South Korea

- Noh Kwang-woo, columnist/Professor in School of Media and Communication at Korea University
- Sunny Ko, Professor of Seoul Institute of the Arts
- Gong Hee-jeong, critic
- Jung Duk-hyun, critic
- Katharine Kim, CEO of Eastwave Studio
- Lee Hun-yul, Professor of School of Media and Communication at Korea University
- Kim Seon-young, critic
- Hong Seok-woo, executive producer in Munhwa Broadcasting Corporation Drama Department

== Winners and nominees ==
The nominations for the 16th Seoul International Drama Awards were announced on September 10, 2021. Winners are listed first and denoted in bold.

=== Program ===
 NOTE:
- "Golden Bird Prize" recipients are indicated with a double dagger (‡)
- "Silver Bird Prize" recipients are indicated with a dagger (†)

Program
| **Grand Prize (Daesang)**: **Missing Child (South Korea)** | **Best Serial Drama**: **The Penthouse: War in Life (South Korea)**‡; **Go Ahead (China)**†; Ana's Revenge (Colombia); The Long Ballad (China); Legacy (Turkey); The Pit season 4 (Turkey); Monarch Industry (China); The Red Room (Turkey) |
| **Best Mini-Series**: **The Investigation (Denmark)**‡; **The Bad Kids (China)**†; 30 Coins (Spain); Dark Woods (Germany); Das Boot season 2 (Germany); It's a Sin (U.K.); Redlight (Netherlands); The Great (U.S.); We Children from Bahnhof Zoo (Germany) | **Best TV Movie**: **Federica Montseny, the Woman Who Speaks (Spain)**‡; **This House Is Mine (Germany)**†; A Bad Word (Germany); Grooming (Argentina); Honour (U.K.); Missing Child (South Korea); SF8: "Joan's Galaxy" (South Korea); The Child of Light (Taiwan) |
| **Best Short-form Drama**: **Passengers (Russia)**‡; **Delete Me (Norway)**†; Blackout (Thailand); Hanging On (South Korea); Dramaworld season 2 (U.S.); No, Thank You (South Korea); Standing Drama – The Play (South Korea); Teaching from Home (Germany) | **Jury's Special Prize**: **Bonus Vacation (Malaysia)**; **Atlantic Crossing (Norway)**; **The Pit season 4 (Turkey)** |

=== Individual ===
 NOTE:
No roles for nominated/winning actor(s)/actress(es) needed.

Individual
| **Best Actor**: **Park Hyuk-kwon – Missing Child (South Korea)**; Kirill Käro – Passengers (Norway); Jung Yoon-seok – Strange School Tales: "The Child Who Would Not Come" (South Korea); Samuel Benito – A Bad Word (Germany); Eduard Fernández – 30 Coins (Spain); Søren Malling – The Investigation (Denmark); Bai Jingting – You Are My Hero (China); Huang Xiaoming – Game Changer (China) | **Best Actress**: **Elle Fanning – The Great (U.S.)**; Park Ha-sun – No, Thank You (South Korea); Thea Sofie Loch Næss – Delete Me (Norway); Iris Berben – This House Is Mine (Germany); Isabelle Gélinas – Fourniret the Showdown (France); Rosalie Thomass – Jackpot (Germany); Carice van Houten – Redlight (Netherlands); Dilraba Dilmurat – The Long Ballad (China); Kim So-yeon – The Penthouse: War in Life (South Korea) |
| **Best Director**: **Cho Yong-won – Missing Child (South Korea)** | **Best Writer**: **Russell T Davies – It's a Sin (U.K.)** |

=== Outstanding Korean Drama ===
Hallyu
| Top Excellence Award | Vincenzo |
| Excellence Award | Start-Up; Taxi Driver; Kairos |
| Best Actor | Song Joong-ki (Vincenzo) |
| Best Actress | Bae Suzy (Start-Up) |
| Best Original Soundtrack (OST) | Young Tak – "Okay" (Revolutionary Sisters) |

=== Special awards ===
Hallyu
| Most Popular Foreign Drama of the Year | I Told Sunset About You (Thailand); Signal (Japan) | |
| Short-form Drama | Golden Bird Prize: Passengers (Russia); Silver Bird Prize: Delete Me (Norway) | Awardees were selected through the Jury and committee. |
| Asian Star Prize | Marcus Chang (Taiwan); Kentaro Sakaguchi (Japan); Zhao Lusi (China); Krit Amnuaydechkorn (Thailand); Amanda Manopo (Indonesia) | Awardees were selected through the Jury and committee. |
| Character of the Year | Ahn Eun-young (Jung Yu-mi); Han Ji-pyeong (Kim Seon-ho); Cha Hyun-soo (Song Kang) | |

== Special performances ==
Order of the presentation, name of the artist, and the song(s) they performed
| Order | Artist | Performed | Ref. |
|---|---|---|---|
| 1 | Jinjo Crew | "Soul of SEOUL" | |
| 2 | Young Tak | "Kkondae Latte" (Kkondae Intern OST) | |
| 2 | Young Tak | "Okay" (Revolutionary Sisters OST) | |
| 3 | Big Naughty | "Kwaejina Ching Ching Nane (Daegu)" | |
| 4 | AB6IX | "Cherry" | |
