= Beautiful World (TV series) =

2019 South Korean television series

- Promotional poster
- Hangul: 아름다운 세상
- RR: Areumdaun sesang
- MR: Arŭmdaun sesang
- Genre: Family drama Melodrama; Thriller
- Written by: Kim Ji-woo
- Directed by: Park Chan-hong
- Starring: Park Hee-soon; Choo Ja-hyun; Oh Man-seok; Cho Yeo-jeong; Nam Da-reum; Kim Hwan-hee
- Music by: Nam Hye-seung
- Country of origin: South Korea
- Original language: Korean
- No. of episodes: 24

Production
- Executive producer: Ham Young-hoon
- Producers: Kim Da-ye; Kim Kyung-tae; Lee Jeong-hee; Nam gung-gyeon
- Running time: 70 minutes
- Production companies: MI Inc. NK Mulsan

Original release
- Network: JTBC
- Release: April 5 – May 25, 2019

Beautiful World (Korean: 아름다운 세상) is a 2019 South Korean television series starring Park Hee-soon, Choo Ja-hyun, Oh Man-seok, Cho Yeo-jeong, Nam Da-reum and Kim Hwan-hee. It aired on JTBC from April 5 to May 25, 2019.

== Synopsis ==
The series follows the story of a boy who becomes critically injured due to an incident of school violence and his family who seeks the truth and fights for justice in his name.

== Cast ==
=== Main ===
- Park Hee-soon as Park Moo-jin

A high school physics teacher.

- Choo Ja-hyun as Kang In-ha

Moo-jin's wife who runs a bakery named after their children.

- Oh Man-seok as Oh Jin-pyo

The chairman of a private school foundation.

- Cho Yeo-jeong as Seo Eun-joo

Jin-pyo's wife who is from a wealthy family.

- Nam Da-reum as Park Sun-ho

Moo-jin and In-ha's son who is a third year middle school student when he becomes a victim of school violence.

- Kim Hwan-hee as Park Su-ho

Sun-ho's younger sister who attends the same school.

=== Supporting ===
- Hwang Tae-kwang as Lee Sang-woo

A rich man who inherited a fortune from his parents.

- Seo Young-joo as Han Dong-soo

A boy who lives without hope for the future in an unfortunate environment.

- Lee Jae-in as Han Dong-hee

Dong-soo little sister.

- Seo Dong-hyun as Oh Joon-seok

Jin-pyo and Eun-joo's son.

- Lee Ji-hyun as Lim Sook-hee
- Yang Han-yeol as Lee Ki-chan

== Viewership ==
Beautiful World : South Korea viewers per episode (thousands)

Season	Episode number																Average
Season	1	2	3	4	5	6	7	8	9	10	11	12	13	14	15	16	Average
1	458	575	682	712	682	667	681	804	800	727	798	916	760	903	890	1160	763

Source: Audience measurement performed nationwide by Nielsen Korea.

Average TV viewership ratings
Ep.	Original broadcast date	Average audience share (Nielsen Korea)	
Ep.	Original broadcast date	Nationwide	Seoul
1	April 5, 2019	2.178%	N/A
2	April 6, 2019	2.926%	3.099%
3	April 12, 2019	3.053%	3.515%
4	April 13, 2019	3.306%	4.006%
5	April 19, 2019	3.346%	3.637%
6	April 20, 2019	3.267%	3.621%
7	April 26, 2019	3.334%	3.665%
8	April 27, 2019	4.001%	4.553%
9	May 3, 2019	3.727%	3.921%
10	May 4, 2019	3.451%	3.804%
11	May 10, 2019	4.222%	4.451%
12	May 11, 2019	4.643%	4.885%
13	May 17, 2019	5.904%	4.505%
14	May 18, 2019	4.331%	5.284%
15	May 24, 2019	4.910%	4.871%
16	May 25, 2019	5.785%	7.076%
Average		3.785%	— (Note: Due to some unpublished ratings, the exact average rating is unknown.)
In the table above, the blue numbers represent the lowest ratings and the red numbers represent the highest ratings.; N/A denotes that the rating is not known.; This series aired on a cable channel/pay TV which normally has a relatively smaller audience compared to free-to-air TV/public broadcasters (KBS, SBS, MBC and EBS).
