= Nam Da-reum =

South Korean actor (born 2002)

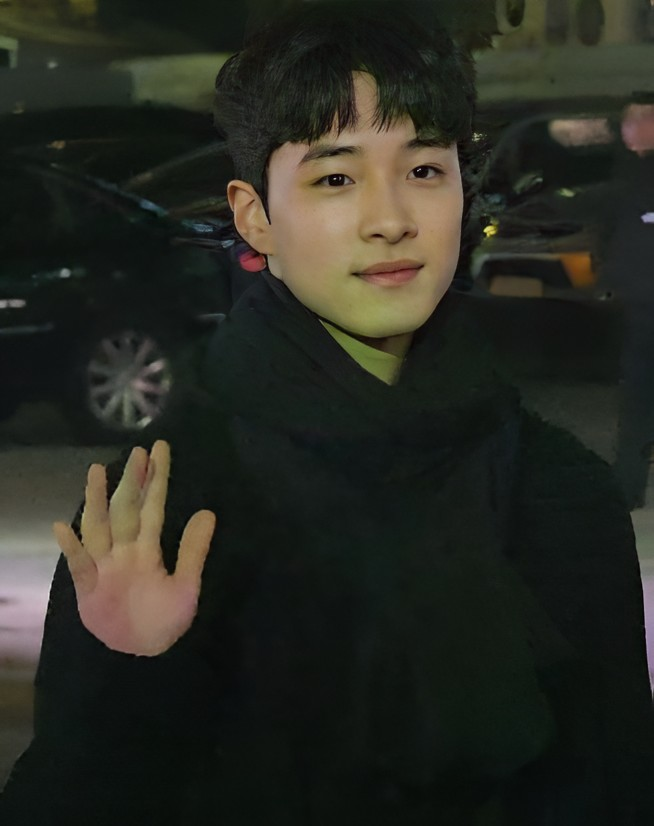
- Nam in November 2018
- Born: June 13, 2002 (age 24); Suwon, Gyeonggi Province, South Korea
- Education: Chung-Ang University – Department of Theater and Film Creation
- Occupation: Actor
- Years active: 2009–present
- Agent: Breeze Artist Agency

Korean name
- Hangul: 남다름
- Hanja: 南多凜
- RR: Nam Dareum
- MR: Nam Tarŭm
- Website: breeze-artist.com/NAMDAREUM

Nam Da-reum (Korean: 남다름; born June 13, 2002) is a South Korean actor. He began his career as a child actor, playing young versions of the leading characters in several popular Korean dramas. He is best known for his lead role in Beautiful World (2019).

His other roles of portraying child and teen versions includes: Boys Over Flowers (2009), Pinocchio (2014), Guardian: The Lonely and Great God (2016), Rain or Shine (2017), The King in Love (2017), While You Were Sleeping (2017), Come and Hug Me (2018), Radio Romance (2018), Start-up (2020), and Doom at Your Service (2021).

== Personal life ==
Nam enlisted and served his mandatory military service on February 8, 2022, at 21 years old in Korean age. He was discharged on August 7, 2023. Nam was accepted into Chung Ang University under the Department of Theater and Film Creation and was in the 63rd class of the Department of Theater. His parents are visual artists and majored in Western Painting. He plays the violin and learnt Taekwondo.

== Filmography ==
=== Films ===
Year	Title	Role	Notes	Ref.
2013	No Breathing	Jung Woo-sang (young)		
2014	Kundo: Age of the Rampant	Jo Yoon (young)		
2015	Chronicle of a Blood Merchant	Heo Il-rak		
2021	The 8th Night	Cheong-seok	Netflix film	
2021	Sinkhole	Jung Seung-tae		
2022	A Birth	Heonjong		

=== Television series ===
Year	Title	Role	Notes	Ref.
2009	Boys Over Flowers	Yoon Ji-hoo (young)		
2009	The Partner	Lee Tae-jo (young)		
2009	Soul	Kim Yoon-oh (young)		
2009	Hero	Choi Han-kyul		
2010	A Man Called God	Choi Kang-ta (young)		
2010	Dong Yi	Prince Eun-pyung	Cameo	
2010	Home Sweet Home	Lee Min-jo		
2011	Gyebaek	Gyo-ki (young)		
2011	Living in Style	Na Hwa-sung		
2011	You're Here, You're Here, You're Really Here	Ko Chan-young (young)		
2011	Saving Mrs. Go Bong-Shil	Choi Seung-yoon		
2012	Love Again	Jin-ho		
2012	The Chaser	Kang Min-sung		
2012	The King's Doctor	Lee Sung-ha (young)		
2013	Ugly Alert	Kong Hyun-suk (young)		
2013	The Suspicious Housekeeper	Eun Sae-kyul		
2014	Three Days	Han Tae-kyung (young)		
2014	Big Man	Kang Dong-suk (young)		
2014	Pinocchio	Ki Ha-myung (young) / Choi Dal-po		
2015	Heart to Heart	Go Yi-seok (young)		
2015	Splendid Politics	Lee Duk-hyung (young)		
2015	Six Flying Dragons	Lee Bang-won (young / episodes 1–4) / Prince Lee Do (ep. 50)		
2016	Memory	Park Jung-woo		
2016	Secret Healer	Heo Jun's disciple	Cameo (ep. 20)	
2016	Entourage	Wang-ho	Cameo (ep. 6)	
2016	Guardian: The Lonely and Great God	Kim Soo-bok	Cameo (episodes 1, 4)	
2017	Bad Thief, Good Thief	Jang Min-jae (young)		
2017	The King in Love	Wang Won (young)		
2017	While You Were Sleeping	Jung Jae-chan (young)		
2017	Rain or Shine	Lee Kang-doo (young)		
2018	Radio Romance	Ji Soo-ho (young)		
2018	Come and Hug Me	Chae Do-jin (young)		
2018	Where Stars Land	Lee Soo-yeon (young)		
2019	Goodbye My Life Insurance	Min-jae		
2019	Beautiful World	Park Sun-ho		
2019	Hotel del Luna	Spirit of the Well	Cameo (episodes 9, 10)	
2019	When the Devil Calls Your Name	Ryu (young)		
2020	A Piece of Your Mind	Moon Ha-won (young)		
2020	Start-Up	Han Ji-pyeong (young)		
2020	Private Lives	Kim Jae Wook (young)		
2021	Doom at Your Service	Park Young / Gwi Gong-ja / Young Prince		
2021	The Great Shaman Ga Doo-shim	Na Woo-soo		
2022	Monstrous	Han Do-kyung		
2022	The Sound of Magic	Ri Eul / Ryu Min-hyuk (young)		
2024	The History of Us	Crown Prince Yi San	KBS Drama Special	
2025	My Youth	Sunwoo Hae (young)		
2025	The Price of Confession	Ko Se-hun		

=== Music video appearances ===
Year	Song title	Artist
2009	"I Cry"	Rizi
2016	"You're So Fine"	CNBLUE
2016	"Glory Days"	CNBLUE
2023	"Start Over"	Siyeon (Dreamcatcher)

== Awards and nominations ==
Name of the award ceremony, year presented, category, nominee of the award, and the result of the nomination
Award ceremony	Year	Category	Nominee / Work	Result	Ref.
APAN Star Awards	2015	Best Young Actor	Pinocchio	Won	
Blue Dragon Film Awards	2021	Best New Actor	Sinkhole	Nominated	
KBS Drama Awards	2018	Best Young Actor	Radio Romance	Won	
MBC Drama Awards	2017	Best Young Actor	The King in Love	Won	
SBS Drama Awards	2017	Youth Acting Award	While You Were Sleeping	Nominated	
