= Han Ji-pyeong =

Start-Up character

- Start-Up character
- Kim Seon-ho as Han Ji-pyeong, wearing the Sandbox mentor t-shirt (2020)
- First appearance: "Start-Up"; October 17, 2020
- Last appearance: "Scale Up"; December 6, 2020
- Created by: Park Hye-ryun
- Portrayed by: Kim Seon-ho (adult); Nam Da-reum (teen)

In-universe information
- Full name: Han Ji-pyeong

Korean name
- Hangul: 한지평
- RR: Han Jipyeong
- MR: Han Chip'yŏng
- Nicknames: Gordon Ramsay of Investment; Sundingie (Good Boy); Han Timjangnim
- Occupation: Venture capitalist Start-up Mentor; Angel Investor
- Affiliation: SH Venture Capital; Sandbox
- Family: Unknown (orphan)
- Nationality: South Korean
- Birthday: May 7, 1984

Han Ji-pyeong (Korean: 한지평, IPA: [han.dʑi.pʰjʌŋ]) is a fictional character from the South Korean television series Start-Up. Directed by Oh Chung-hwan, the 16-episode series aired on tvN from October 17 to December 6, 2020, every Saturday and Sunday, while simultaneously released on Netflix in 50 countries.

The character was created by series screenwriter Park Hye-ryun and portrayed by two actors: Kim Seon-ho as an adult and Nam Da-reum as a teenager. He is introduced first as an adult in the pilot episode, a venture capitalist working as a team leader at SH Venture Capital, known as the "genius investor" and the "Gordon Ramsay of the investment world," a nickname attributed to his sharp-tongued demeanor. The episode also includes a flashback to his teenage years as an orphan transitioning out of foster care. By the series's conclusion, Ji-pyeong is promoted to executive director at the same company and becomes an angel investor for a social startup.

Ji-pyeong's narrative is noted for its literary parallel to Cyrano de Bergerac: as a teenager, he becomes the long-lost pen pal of protagonist Seo Dal-mi under the pseudonym "Nam Do-san." Fifteen years later, he recruits the real Nam Do-san to maintain the deception, creating a love triangle while mentoring their startup. This storyline sparked widespread "Second Lead Syndrome," with many viewers expressing favor for Ji-pyeong over the male lead.

Critically acclaimed, the character was named one of the "Characters of the Year" at the Seoul International Drama Awards. Kim Seon-ho's performance earned him a nomination for Best Supporting Actor – Television at the 57th Baeksang Arts Awards and won him the fan-voted Popular Actor Award at the same ceremony. He also received the Emotive Award at the Asia Artist Awards and an Actor Award at the Brand Customer Loyalty Awards. The role significantly raised Kim's public profile, leading to his inclusion on the 2021 Forbes Korea Power Celebrity 40 list.

== Characterization ==
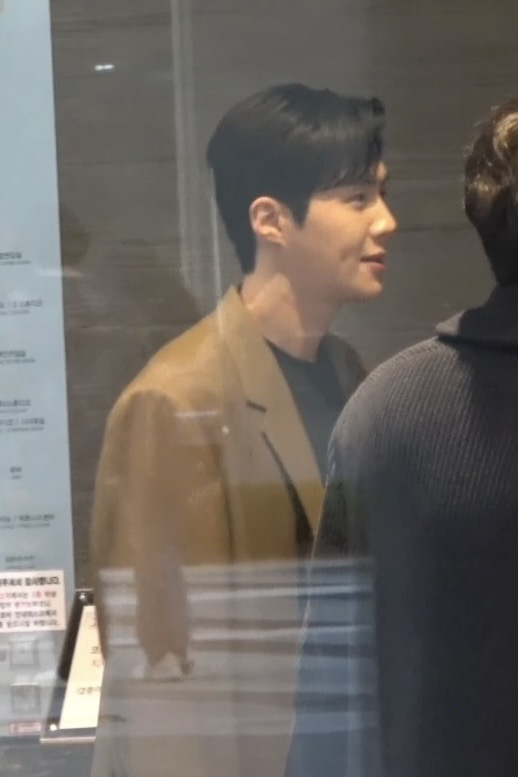
Kim Seon-ho as Han Ji-pyeong

Han Ji-pyeong is one of the main characters in the television series Start-Up. The story centers on young entrepreneurs at Sandbox, a fictional startup accelerator in Seoul, mirroring Silicon Valley. Han is introduced in the pilot episode as Han Timjangnim (한 팀장님; 'Team Leader Han') at SH Venture Capital, (Note: Starting as Han timjangnim (한 팀장님; 'Team leader Han'), at SH Ventures, Han Ji-pyeong was promoted to Han sangmunim (한 상무님; 'Executive Director Han') three years later. His colleagues, including Dal-mi, consistently used these professional titles when addressing him.) the investment firm that oversees and manages Sandbox under a shared leadership structure headed by CEO Yoon Seon-hak.

Ji-pyeong is characterized as a genius investor and the "Gordon Ramsay of the investment world" within the series' universe. This reputation stems from his ability to identify high-potential startups and a direct communication style defined by blunt, rigorous evaluations of business proposals. His status as a leading professional executive is further established by his features in men's magazines.

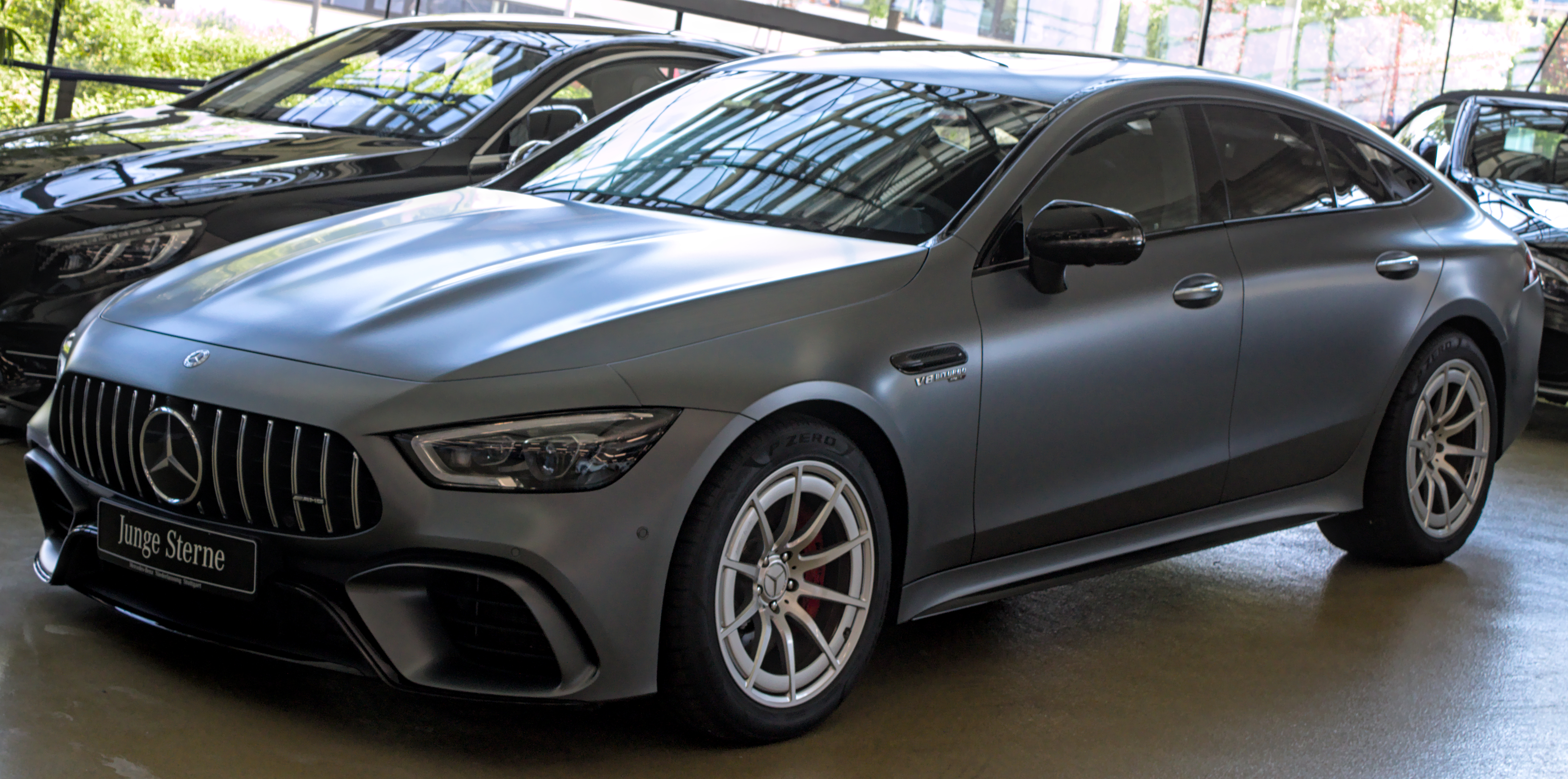
Han Ji-pyeong owned two Mercedes-Benz, including a Mercedes-AMG GT 4-Door Coupé

Ji-pyeong's professional success as a venture capitalist is defined by a multi-million dollar salary and the ownership of Mercedes-Benz vehicles. He resides in a luxury apartment overlooking the Han River. In his apartment, he installed Jang Yeong-sil, the Jiphyeonjeon Tech AI speaker that functioned as a smart secretary and home automation. He frequently asks the device questions, receiving a mixture of nonsensical and insightful advice. These interactions with an AI character highlight his underlying loneliness and social isolation, contrasting his wealth with a lack of meaningful human connection.

== Storyline ==
=== Backstory ===
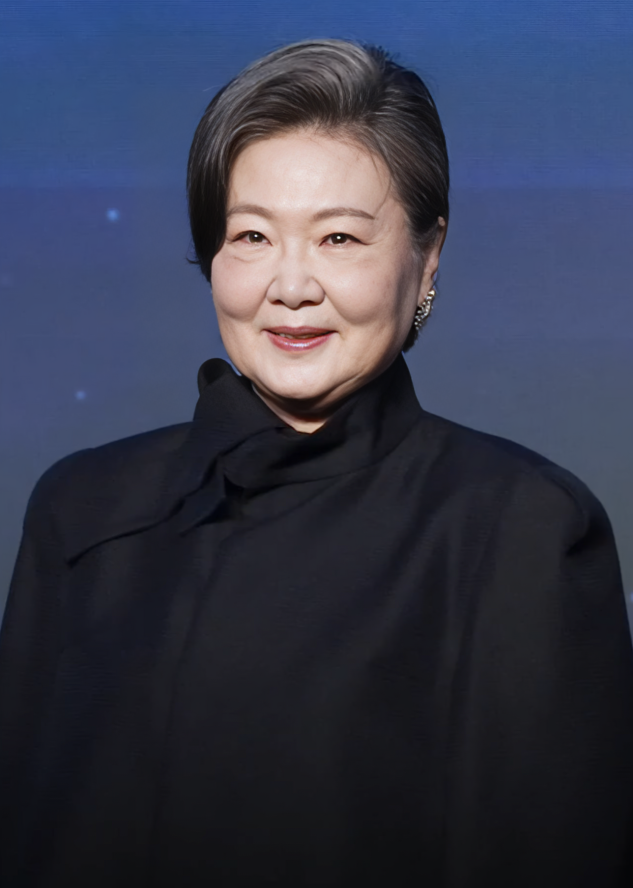
Actress Kim Hae-sook portrayed Choi Won-deok.

In the pilot episode, "Start-Up," Ji-pyeong appears as a featured speaker at a Sandbox startup lecture alongside CEO Yoon Seon-hak (Seo Yi-sook) and guest speaker Won In-jae (Kang Han-na). During the session, he recognizes Seo Dal-mi (Bae Suzy) in the audience, triggering a flashback to fifteen years prior. At age 17, Ji-pyeong was an orphan transitioning out of foster care. (Note: Jaripjunbicheongnyeon (자립준비청년; 'Youth preparing for self-reliance') is term depicting orphan who was aged out from foster care system. This term was formally adopted in 2022, replacing the former term of Bohojongnyoadong (보호종료아동; 'child whose protection has ended').) His situation was marked by a stark contrast: he had won a national investment competition with a prize of 100 million won in "cyber money," yet he remained cash-strapped because the prize could not be converted into real money. With only a two million won government stipend, he was unable to secure an apartment until he was taken in by Choi Won-deok, a corn dog vendor who provided him with shelter in her shop.

Won-deok affectionately nicknamed him Sundingi (순딩이; 'gentle') and, at her request, Ji-pyeong began a correspondence with her granddaughter, Dal-mi. Using the pseudonym "Nam Do-san," a name he borrowed from a local math prodigy, his letters provided Dal-mi with emotional support following her parents' divorce. During his one year living at the corn dog shop, Ji-pyeong managed Won-deok's eight million won in savings, increasing the capital tenfold through stock investments. He intended to use these gains for his university education, but a misunderstanding arose when he wrongly accused Won-deok of withdrawing the funds to support her son's business. Despite prior conflict, Won-deok still went to the bus station to see him off, gave him a new pair of shoes, and offered him an open invitation to return in times of hardship before he departed for Seoul to begin his studies.

=== Mentorship and love triangle arc ===
Following the Sandbox lecture, Ji-pyeong tracks Dal-mi to locate Won-deok and visits her food truck the next day. They reunite after fifteen years. Won-deok declines his offer to purchase her a store, prompting Ji-pyeong to provide his business card as an assurance of future assistance. Meanwhile Dal-mi's scheme to forge a relationship with "a successful Nam Do-san" to impress her sister In-jae, turns into a liability when In-jae invites her and her "boyfriend" to a networking event. At Won-deok's request, Ji-pyeong helps find the real Nam Do-san. Ji-pyeong persuades Do-san to pose as Dal‑mi's childhood pen pal by lending him the letters he has kept for years. Do-san agrees only if his start-up, Samsan Tech, is allowed into Sandbox. Citing a conflict of interest, Ji-pyeong refuses. Still, touched by the letters, Do-san attends the event anyway.

The lie triggers a domino effect. Do-san applies to the 12th Sandbox hackathon on his own merits, and when Dal-mi and In-jae discover that he is not the successful CEO he claimed to be, both sisters still try to recruit him. The Samsan Tech team joins Dal‑mi, with Dal-mi serving as their CEO. Once the team is accepted into Sandbox, Dal-mi selects Ji-pyeong as their mentor. During the accelerator program, Samsan Tech develops NoonGil, an artificial intelligence application for the visually impaired. Ji-pyeong maintains a blunt professional standard, criticizing the application's high burn rate and lack of a revenue model while guiding Dal-mi on leadership strategy. Their relationship is complicated by the letter deception: Won‑deok forbids Ji‑pyeong from telling Dal‑mi the truth. The resulting tension sparks a romantic rivalry between Ji‑pyeong and Do‑san. On the eve of Demo Day, Dal-mi discovers the deception and confronts him. Ji-pyeong later confesses his romantic feelings to her.

On Demo Day, a co-founder of Samsan Tech blames Ji-pyeong's past critiques for a family tragedy. Severely affected by the accusation, Ji-pyeong is absent from the event. During his absence, and following their victory at Demo Day, Samsan Tech secures an acquihire offer from Alex Kwon of 2STO. Unaware of the negotiations, Ji-pyeong is unable to intervene before the signing of a predatory contract that recruits the engineers but excludes Dal-mi and the team's designer. Upon discovering that Won-deok's deteriorating eyesight has made her dependent on the NoonGil application, Ji-pyeong negotiates with 2STO to ensure the project's continued maintenance before the engineers depart for Silicon Valley.

Three years later, Ji‑pyeong has risen to Sangmunim (상무님; 'Executive Director'). He remains a trusted colleague of Dal‑mi, who has become CEO of Cheongmyeong Company. When Nam Do-san returns, the rivalry over Dal-mi resumes. Seeking closure, Ji-pyeong requests that Do-san return the childhood letters and eventually withdraws from the competition, clarifying to Dal-mi that he is not the "Nam Do-san from the letters." In the series finale, Ji-pyeong encounters Hong Ji-seok, a founder seeking capital for a social startup focused on youth preparing for self-reliance. Recognizing that the venture does not meet the strict investment criteria of SH Venture Capital, Ji-pyeong personally invest as an angel investor. By providing both funding and mentorship, he mirrors the support Won-deok once provided him, completing his character arc.

== Development ==
=== Creation ===
The character Han Ji-pyeong was conceived by screenwriter Park Hye-ryun for a miniseries first announced in late 2019 under the working title Sandbox. Director Oh Chung-hwan stated that the series' concept, which explores the idea of "Korea's Silicon Valley," underwent a two-year development period before its October 2020 premiere. This fictional startup accelerator was modeled after SparkLabs, a global startup accelerator founded in South Korea in 2012. Lee Hee-yoon, a director at SparkLabs, served as the primary advisor for the drama. Former Major League Baseball player Chan Ho Park, a venture partner at the actual firm, also made a cameo appearance in the series.

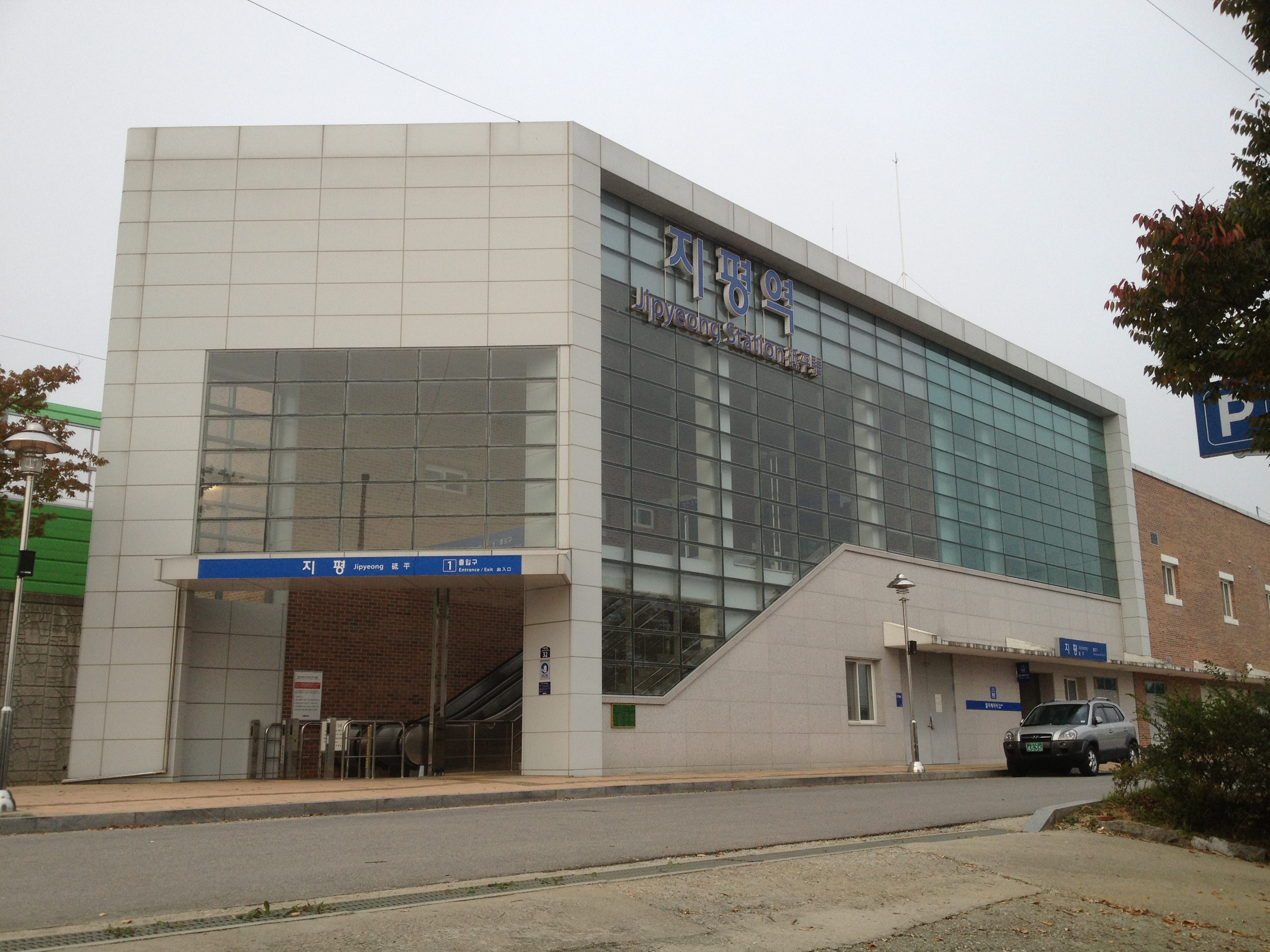
Ji-pyeong Station, Jipyeong-myeon, Yangpyeong-gun, Gyeonggi-do

The production marked a milestone for its production house History D&C; CEO Hwang Ki-yong confirmed it as the studio's inaugural release following his departure from iHQ. By February 2020, the series was officially added to the 2020 tvN drama lineup under its finalized title, Start-Up; the change from working title Sandbox was implemented to prevent brand confusion with existing South Korean companies.

While early casting reports provided brief descriptions of the roles, detailed character profiles remained undisclosed until their publication on the official tvN website. In August 2020, reports indicated that the production adopted a naming convention based on railway and subway stations to distinguish the protagonists from real-world corporate figures. Han Ji-pyeong's given name was derived from Ji-pyeong Station.

=== Casting ===
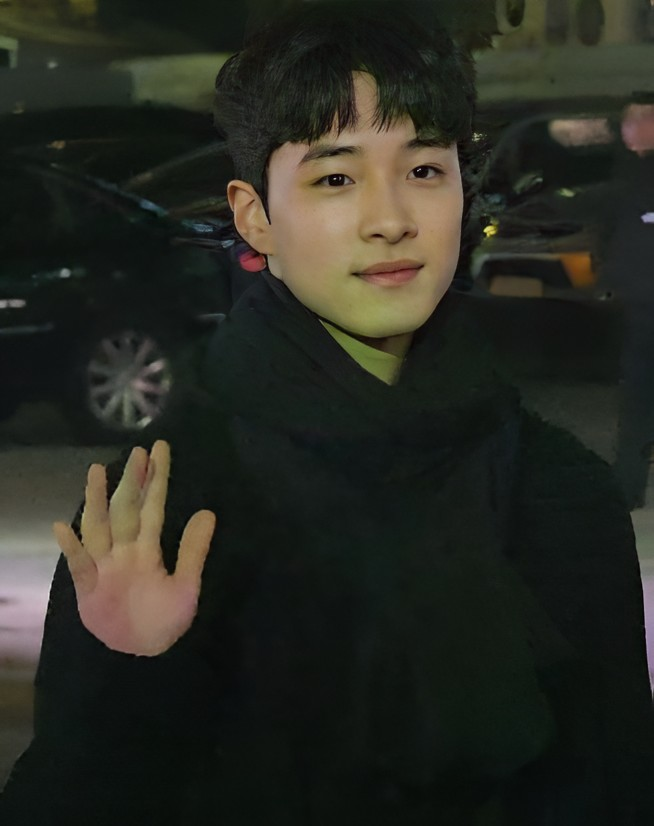
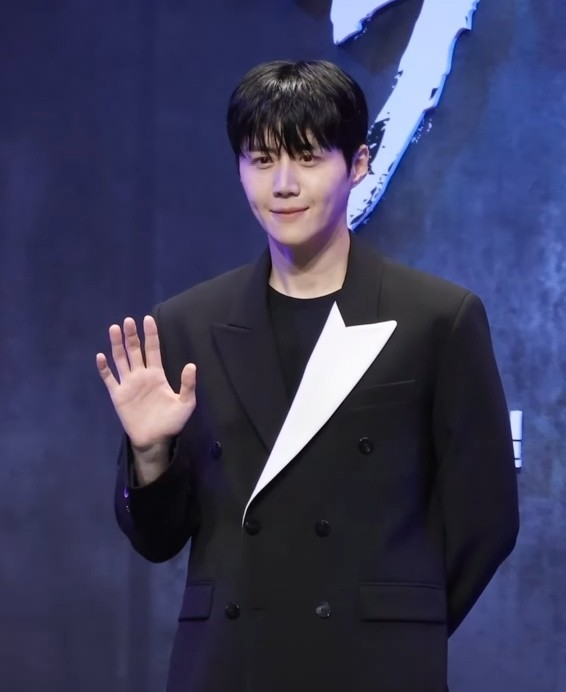
Nam Da-reum (L) who portrayed teenage Han Ji-pyeong in the pilot episode and Kim Seon-ho (R) who portrayed adult Han Ji-pyeong

Reports about the casting of the drama, initially titled Sandbox, began in November 2019, when Suzy and Nam Joo-hyuk were named as potential leads. Kim Seon-ho was the first cast member to be confirmed, in January 2020. He accepted the role Han Ji-pyeong after reading the first five episodes of the script. He said his main reason for joining the project was to work with writer Park Hye-ryun and director Oh Chung-hwan. He was already a fan of Park's earlier works, I Can Hear Your Voice and Pinocchio, and of Oh's, The Doctors and Hotel del Luna.

Kim was drawn to the script's depiction of youth development and challenges, particularly emphasizing Ji-pyeong's narrative as a key factor in his interest. In other interviews, he also said, "When I read the script, I was struck by its beauty. It's a story with a truly fairytale-like charm, yet at the same time, one that feels like it could actually happen. I suddenly felt like I could be a part of this story, so I was the first to say I wanted to be a part of it."

During the Start-Up press conference on October 12, 2020, director Oh stated that he cast Kim after consulting the actor's theater colleagues, "After listening to their stories, I thought, 'Wow, this kind of person could definitely play the role of Han Ji-pyeong,' and cast him. On set, Kim Seon-ho actually gave us more than 200% of what we expected." Oh added, "Kim Seon-ho is an actor I've personally liked since Chief Kim. He's clean, but he also has complex and sharp sides, but in reality, his personality is gentle. On set, he's the oldest, but he's the cutest. The character Han Ji-pyeong has a sharp edge, and in the drama, he's called Sundingi (순딩이; 'gentle'). I thought he was an actor with that kind of side."

Nam Da-reum was officially cast as younger Ji-pyeong in August 2020. Nam has frequently portrayed the younger versions of protagonists in projects written by Park Hye-ryun, including the Oh Chung-hwan-directed series While You Were Sleeping (2017). Regarding his casting, Nam remarked, "I'm so happy to be able to work with writer Park Hye-ryun and director Oh Chung-hwan again in the final days of my teenage years. I want to repay their trust with excellent acting. I think I'll be able to show viewers a side of me that's a little different from my previous child roles."

=== Portrayal ===
Even with Start-Up, at the beginning I doubted myself a lot and wondered if I was doing well. At first I portrayed the character a little heavier and sharper, but because it’s a youth drama we decided to soften him a bit, and we’ve been adjusting that as we go. Adding more wit and bringing out fun situations more. In the end that made the story flow more naturally and helped a lot. Still, at the start I was anxious because some aspects were different from the character I’d planned in advance. Ji-pyeong? Here? Really do it like that? I felt I needed Do-san to blend in more with Dal-mi, but I didn’t realize that then. So now I’m really grateful to the director. It’s become much more natural, and the drama feels more comfortable too.

— Kim, in an interview quoted by Esquire Korea

Kim Seon-ho noted that the role introduced him to the startup industry, prompting him to prepare by reading books, studying online references, and watching lectures to familiarize himself with startup terminology. He identified Ji-pyeong's "talent and foresight in investing" as a unique strengths, specifically citing his "ability as a skilled investor and his extraordinary financial resources."

Kim also carefully crafted the character of Han Ji-pyeong, stating, "I put a lot of effort into both his external and internal aspects. I thought a lot about how he would walk, how he would speak, and what facial expressions he would make," constantly perfecting the role by asking, "What would Han Ji-pyeong do?" To portray a convincing executive, Kim collaborated with his team to curate costumes that reflected Ji-pyeong's professional status. Following the story's three-year time jump, he adopted a more sophisticated appearance by adjusting his hairstyle and clothing to portray Ji-pyeong's career progression.

Kim collaborated closely with director Oh to develop distinct interpersonal dynamics of Ji-pyeong, noting that the character's attitude "clearly differs depending on who he is with." He sought to highlight these unique behaviors, whether Ji-pyeong is acting on personal feelings toward Do-san, supporting Dal-mi from the shadows, or showing vulnerability toward Won-deok. He stressed that this complexity makes Ji-pyeong a "multi-dimensional character." Kim concluded that the character "embodies a gentle side, a sharp side, a witty side, as well as a sad and poignant side." According to him, this led many viewers to "love and support Han Ji-pyeong." He also interpreted Ji-pyeong's adult composure as a mask for an "imperfect inner self" shaped by past hardships.

To maintain character consistency over the 15-year narrative gap, the relationship with Choi Won-deok (Kim Hae-sook) serves as an anchor for both performances. Kim analyzed Nam's portrayal of the adolescent Ji-pyeong, noting, "When we filmed the sad scenes, the director and I watched Nam Da-reum's footages from start to finish and then shot together. I considered things like his way of speaking and other small details. Because Nam Da-reum and I are portraying the same person, I hoped viewers would naturally accept the two performances as one character's narrative and be able to empathize." In a separate interview with Pickcon Korea, Nam commented, "Actor Kim Seon-ho referenced those parts in my acting, which I think helped the child and adult Ji-pyeong synchronize very well. He's such a great actor. I am grateful that he seemed to view my work kindly as well."

Reflecting on his similarities to the role, Kim stated: "Since I played the character of Han Ji-pyeong, I think it's probably around fifty percent. Unlike Ji-pyeong, I'm not good at saying cold things to others, and in real life, I don't have a nice home or a nice car, but since I played the role, I think I reflected at least half of myself."

== Impact and legacy ==
=== Reception ===
"Han Ji-pyeong in Start-Up embodies all the strengths Kim Seon-ho showed in 2 Days & 1 Night, with an added layer of 'sharpness.' This sharpness doesn't come off as arrogant or mean; rather, it's a character who offers blunt advice with care, providing comfort in this era. In 2 Days & 1 Night, Kim Seon-ho is competitive but steps up to embrace the team at critical moments, playing a role that 'sets the stage' for others. His warm and stable character fits well in any group, so it seems his real-life image is being utilized in the drama as well."

— Pop culture critic Kim Sung-soo, in an interview quoted by Yonhap News

Critical response to Start-Up was polarized upon its 2020 release. While some outlets designated it among the year's best Korean drama, others identified narrative inconsistencies and a perceived lack of realism regarding the startup industry. Despite the mixed reception of the series, the character Han Ji-pyeong received consistently positive reviews from both critics and audiences.

In an interview with Forbes, licensed therapist Jeanie Y. Chang identified the character as "a symbol of hope," noting that his trajectory from foster care to professional success resonated with viewers. Since the series concluded, he has remained a fixture in retrospective lists of notable K-drama figures. He was also particularly lauded for his fashion; Charisma Shetty included him in Teen Vogue's "7 Most Stylish K-Drama Characters."

The portrayal by Kim Seon-ho was frequently cited as a primary factor in the character's success. Seok Jae-hyun of Newsen argued that Kim was the only redeeming aspect of the flawed Start-Up. Kim Jae-ha of Teen Vogue observed that the second male lead, Kim, "is so charismatic" that his storyline often overshadows that of the lead. Kharisma Shetty of GQ India echoed this, saying Kim's "brilliant performance as Han Ji-pyeong stole the show" and, though a second lead, he felt "more like the main character." Writing for Entermedia, novelist Park Saeng-gang commended Kim's versatility, specifically noting his comedic timing and comparing his fluid delivery to a "sweet latte."

=== Team Han Ji-pyeong ===
The drama's love triangle polarized social media into two factions: "Team Han Ji-pyeong" (also known as "Team Good Boy") and the main lead's "Team Nam Do-san". Ji-pyeong is frequently cited in media analysis as an example of 'Second Lead Syndrome," with a significant portion of viewers favoring Ji-pyeong as Seo Dal-mi's romantic partner. A November 2021 Naver Entertainment poll titled "If I were Dal-mi?" demonstrated this preference, with 81% of 55,005 participants (44,779) choosing Ji-pyeong. Consequently, the series finale generated divergent public reactions regarding the resolution of the romantic arc.

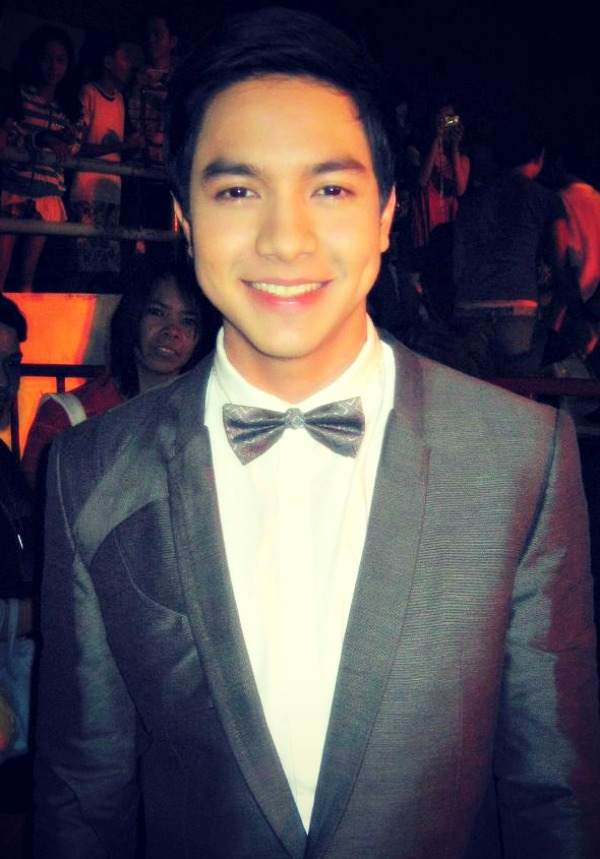
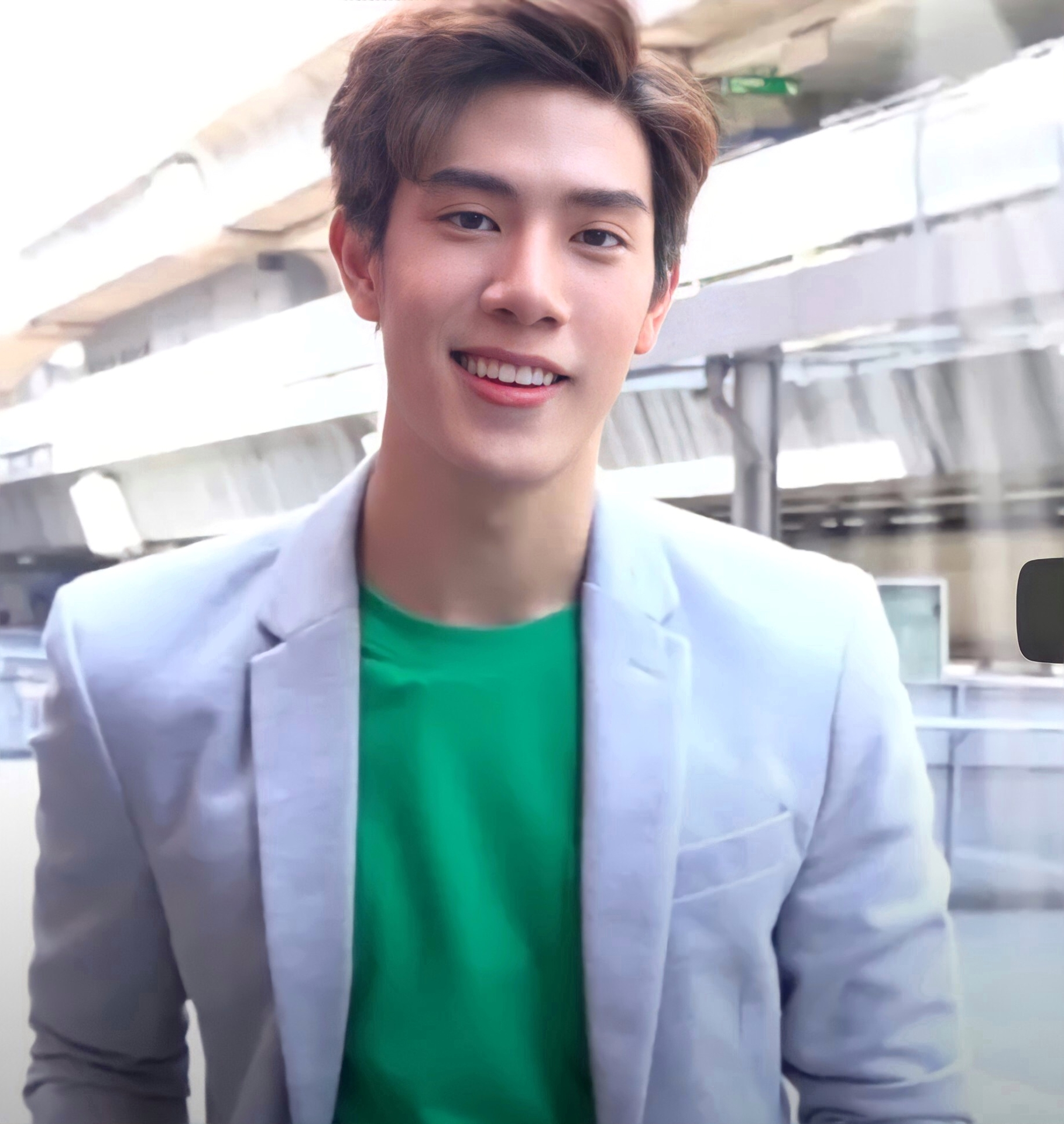
Alden Richards (L) as Tristan from Start Up PH and Sapol Assawamunkong (R) as Jiraphat from Start Up Thailand. Both actors portrayed localized versions of Han Ji‑pyeong in international adaptations.

Ji-pyeong's arc inspired vocalist Yael Yuzon of the Filipino rock band Sponge Cola to write the single "Siguro Nga". The song was composed to reflect the character's emotional trajectory and "heartbreak," which Yuzon described as a "lasting undulating pain."

Viewers frequently identified a parallel between the character and Cyrano de Bergerac, citing Ji-pyeong as the modern iteration of the Cyrano archetype. While Esquire editor Oh Seong-yun noted that Ji-pyeong carried the narrative's emotional weight, this existed in direct tension with the 'ghostwriter' archetype's typically tragic arc and the genre conventions that favored a Dal-mi and Do-san endgame.

International adaptations featured different narrative outcomes for the character. In the Philippine adaptation, Start-Up PH (2022), the character was renamed Tristan and played by Alden Richards. This version repositioned the character as main protagonist and the romantic partner of the female lead, an alteration implemented in response to the prevalence of "second-lead syndrome" among Filipino viewers of the original series. The 2024 Thai adaptation renamed the character as Jiraphat and portrayed by Sapol Assawamunkong; the character remains the second lead, and concluded with the female lead choosing a platonic relationship with both men. Regardless of these international adaptations, retrospective reviews and listicles continue to cite the original Han Ji-pyeong as a quintessential example of second-lead syndrome in television.

=== Tourism ===
The official Visit Seoul portal features key filming locations from Start-Up, highlighting Hapjeongdon on Huiujeong-ro in Mapo-gu, Seoul, as a vital setting in the drama's narrative. The site, which houses the mailbox where Ji-pyeong and Dal-mi exchanged letters, sits in front of the corn dog shop run by Dal-mi's grandmother (originally a themed restaurant serving meat). The list of featured locations also includes the Oil Tank Culture Park and Nodeul Island, both of which served as the backdrop for Sandbox.

=== Challenging the 'Orphan Formula' in media ===
Han Ji-pyeong was an orphan who aged out of foster care at 18, a demographic referred to in South Korea as Jaripjunbicheongnyeon (자립준비청년; 'Youth preparing for self-reliance'). During a September 2020 campaign for The Beautiful Foundation, (Note: The Beautiful Foundation is a non-profit organization established in August 2000, to spread a mature philanthropic culture and support neighbors in community and public-benefit activities.) researcher Son Ja-young analyzed 40 Korean dramas and identified a harmful "orphan formula" that typically stereotyped such characters as criminals or outcasts. The character was praised for breaking these stereotypes, with Son noting: "Han Ji-pyeong is the 'first ordinary character' who left foster care that I've ever encountered." To acknowledge this impact, the foundation sent a handwritten letter from Son and merchandise from Joo Kyung-min's webtoon How I Ended Up in the Desert on December 20, 2020. In a statement to Export News in January 2021, they stated, "We sent a handwritten letter and gift to the Studio Dragon production team for creating the character of Han Ji-pyeong, who has been a great source of encouragement for 'youth preparing for self-reliance,' and to actor Kim Seon-ho for bringing the character to life with his excellent acting."

The foundation subsequently mentioned Han Ji-pyeong in its ongoing campaign. In July 2021, Han Chan-hee, Chairman of the Beautiful Foundation, remarked, "[…] Additionally, the image of those who have aged out of care, as portrayed in the media, has become far more diverse. An example is the character Han Ji-pyeong, played by actor Kim Seon-ho in the drama Start-Up." As part of the Media Awareness Improvement Project, Son Ja‑young later organized the "Generation MZ: 18 Adults Talk About Tomorrow" event on September 3, 2022. Stressing the need to portray orphaned characters as ordinary young people; the follow‑up discussion named Han Ji-pyeong from Start-Up and Cha Mi-jo (Son Ye-jin) from Thirty-Nine. On December 10, 2022, Son organized the "Media Character Awards Ceremony," with winners chosen through a survey and public vote involving 645 participants. The initiative featured the Eightheen Adults Award category created to recognize nuanced portrayals of youth preparing for self-reliance. Oh Mi-joo (played by Shin Se-kyung) from the drama Run On placed first, followed by Han Ji-pyeong in second place.

The campaign's influence extended to charitable support. In May 2021, global fan cafes Seonhohada USA and Kim Seonho Union donated ₩4.6 million to The Beautiful Foundation. Both lead actors also supported the cause. Bae Suzy donated ₩100 million to the Happiness Sharing Association to support children in orphanages and youth preparing for self-reliance in late April 2021. Kim Seon-ho has celebrated his birthday for three consecutive years (2023–2025) by donating to the Korean Red Cross to support youth preparing for self-reliance, with fans initially chose the cause trough voting. His donations over this period, totaling ₩250 million, have funded daily essentials, learning devices, medical aid, and self‑reliance programs.

=== Influence on the Asian start-up community ===
Han Ji-pyeong's portrayal as a venture capitalist, angel investor, and startup mentor generated widespread discussion within the Asian startup community, with several debates focusing on the accuracy of the show's portrayal of the startup industry. Reviewing the series for the Massachusetts Institute of Technology's The Tech, Gloria Lin and Levi Villarreal noted that the technical aspects of the series were "more believable and detail-oriented" than those in typical Korean drama. Media also analyzed key business and investment takeaways from the show, particularly regarding venture capital, and the startup industry.

Several industry-focused publications noted that the character significantly increased public awareness of the venture capital field. Writing for the Seoul Economic Daily, Yeon Seung observed that Ji-pyeong's popularity coincided with growing public interest in venture capital. This sentiment was echoed by VC Discovery Webzine, a publication of the Korea Venture Capital Association, which credited Ji-pyeong with promoting their profession. Industry insiders, as reported by Deal Site's Ryu Seok, viewed the portrayal as realistic, particularly in its depiction of the trust-based partnerships required between startups and investors. The media began using the moniker "real-life Han Ji-pyeong" to identify real-life venture capitalists. Following the series' broadcast, Ji-pyeong also became a frequent point of reference in Asian media coverage of business, investment, and related professional fields.

In 2021, the Indonesian fintech firm Ajaib appointed Kim Seon-ho as its first brand ambassador, specifically utilizing the Han Ji-pyeong persona to anchor its marketing campaigns. Ajaib executives stated the character's narrative background as a self-made professional with a reputation for investment expertise was selected to serve as a relatable mentor for a millennial user base. Years after the show's release, the character continues to be cited as memorable, including a 2025 feature by Tatler Asia listing him among the twelve smartest K-drama characters.

=== Impact on actor's career ===
The role substantially increased Kim Seon-ho's domestic and international visibility. During the show's run, he ranked in Good Data's Top 10 Actor Buzz-worthiness for six consecutive weeks, hitting his peak at third place in mid-November. That same month, the Korean Business Research Institute ranked him first in its Actor Brand Reputation index. His social media following multiplied: his Instagram followers rose from 620,000 before the show to 2.08 million by November 19, 2020, and then exceeded 3 million within two months. This led to numerous domestic and international endorsements across the technology, food, and fashion sectors. Media reports in 2021 coined the "Kim Seon-ho effect" to describe sales increases at several partner brands.

Kim has described the character of Han Ji-pyeong as a "gift." In 2021, Han Ji-pyeong was named one of the Seoul International Drama Awards' Characters of the Year, featured in an award show segment recognizing the "Avenger of Korean drama 2020." For his performance, Kim received the Emotive Award at the Asia Artist Award and the Actor Award at the 2021 Brand Customer Loyalty Awards. He was also voted Most Popular Actor at the 57th Baeksang Arts Awards, where he was also nominated for Best Supporting Actor – Television. Further recognition included his placement on the 2021 Forbes Korea Power Celebrity 40 list.
