= Start-Up (South Korean TV series) =

2020 South Korean television series

- Promotional poster
- Hangul: 스타트업
- RR: Seutateueop
- MR: Sŭt'at'ŭŏp
- Genre: Romantic drama; Romantic comedy; Slice of life
- Written by: Park Hye-ryun
- Directed by: Oh Chung-hwan
- Starring: Bae Suzy; Nam Joo-hyuk; Kim Seon-ho; Kang Han-na
- Country of origin: South Korea
- Original language: Korean
- No. of episodes: 16

Production
- Executive producers: Hwang Ki-young; Yoo Sang won
- Producers: An Chang-ho; Im Hyung-sub; Son Ja-young; Kwon Kyung-hyun
- Running time: 72–85 minutes
- Production companies: Studio Dragon; HighZium Studio

Original release
- Network: tvN
- Release: October 17 – December 6, 2020

Related
- Start-Up PH

Start-Up (Korean: 스타트업) is a 2020 South Korean television series starring Bae Suzy, Nam Joo-hyuk, Kim Seon-ho and Kang Han-na. The series revolves around a woman who has dreams of becoming an entrepreneur like Steve Jobs, and her love triangle between a man who is secretly her first love and another man who is pretending to be her first love. It aired on tvN from October 17 to December 6, 2020, every Saturday and Sunday at 21:00 (KST). It is available for streaming on Netflix.

== Synopsis ==
Set in South Korea's fictional Silicon Valley called Sandbox, Start-Up tells the story of people in the world of startup companies.

Seo Dal-mi (Bae Suzy) is a bright and ambitious young woman who dreams of becoming Korea's Steve Jobs. Dal-mi doesn't have a fancy background but she's passionate about her work. She has bright energy and is a person of great vitality, having experience in a wide range of part-time jobs.

Nam Do-san (Nam Joo-hyuk), is the founder of Samsan Tech. A 'math genius', or genius savant, as a young boy, Do-san was once the pride of his family but became their shame now, as his business has been going down for the past two years. He finds out that Dal-mi mistakenly remembers him as a secret pen pal whom she thinks of as her first love, so he decides to work his way up in hopes of turning that misunderstanding into reality.

== Cast ==
=== Main ===
- Bae Suzy as Seo Dal-mi
  - Heo Jung-eun as young Seo Dal-mi

She dreams of becoming Korea's Steve Jobs. She was born to a humble family and lives with her grandmother. However, she's also an adventurer who has a grand plan for herself. Her drive also came from being abandoned by her mother and sister at a young age. She also has experience in a wide range of part-time jobs and is a person of unstable mentality.

- Nam Joo-hyuk as Nam Do-san
  - Kim Kang-hoon as young Nam Do-san

Do-san is the founder of Samsan Tech. He was once the pride of his family as a math genius, but he is now shy and cannot even look people in the eye. After having had no business success in the past two years with his two programmer friends, he is almost ready to give up. Because of his name, Seo Dal-mi mistakenly believes him to be her 'cool first love' although they had never met. He decides to begin a startup in the hope of turning Seo Dal-mi's misunderstanding into a reality.

- Kim Seon-ho as Han Ji-pyeong
  - Nam Da-reum as young Han Ji-pyeong

A team leader at SH Venture Capital, his astonishing investment skills and sharp tongue earn him the nickname, "the Gordon Ramsay of investments." Though he's prickly to most others, he's softer than anyone to one special person who granted him a great favor in the past. An orphan, at the age of 18 he was helped by Seo Dal-mi's grandmother and never forgot her kindness. He used the fake name of Nam Do-san to write letters to Seo Dal-mi at her grandmother's request.

- Kang Han-na as Won In-jae/Seo In-jae
  - Lee Re as young Won In-jae

Won In-jae is Seo Dal-mi's older sister. She has everything society respects: a strong educational background, beautiful appearance, and money. She eventually realizes her background as a second-generation chaebol is a weakness and does everything she can to create success on her own and be acknowledged for her skills.

=== Supporting ===
==== Seo Dal-mi and Won In-jae's family ====
- Kim Hae-sook as Choi Won-deok

Seo Chung-myung's mother, and Seo Dal-mi and Won In-jae's grandmother.

- Song Seon-mi as Cha Ah-hyun

Seo Dal-mi and Won In-jae's mother. Having divorced her husband out of impatience with his unstable employment, she ends up marrying the wealthy Won Doo-jung. She ultimately regrets leaving Dal-mi and In-jae's dad for Doo-Jung as he cheats on her but she finds it hard to give up the luxurious life which he affords her.

- Um Hyo-sup as Won Doo-jung

Won In-jae's stepfather and the Chairman of The Morning group. He shows a ruthless drive to exert power over others in his drive for business dominance.

- Moon Dong-hyeok as Won Sang-soo

Won Don-Jung's son, Won In-jae's stepbrother. In a power move, he becomes the Chief Executive Officer of the Morning group.

==== Samsan Tech ====
- Yoo Su-bin as Lee Chul-san

A friend of Do-san since they were in university, he joined the company after resigning due to a ransomware that had taken control while he was in-charge and was told to pay 100 million won.

- Kim Do-wan as Kim Yong-san

A friend of Do-san since they were in university, he had his own agenda for getting into Sandbox, relating to the death of his brother who was a CEO at Sandbox's 2nd cohort.

- Stephanie Lee as Jeong Sa-ha

A former lawyer who quits her job to pursue something more adventurous. She speaks fluent English and intersperses English expressions even while speaking Korean with her teammates.

==== Nam Do-san's family ====
- Kim Hee-jung as Park Geum-jung

Nam Do-san's mother.

- Kim Won-hae as Nam Sung-hwan

Nam Do-san's father.

- Jang Se-hyun as Nam Chun-ho

Nam Do-san's cousin.

==== SH Venture Capital ====
- Seo Yi-sook as Yoon Seon-hak

The CEO of Sandbox and SH Venture Capital.

- Kim Min-seok as Park Dong-cheon

The assistant or secretary of Ji-pyeong and mentoring manager of Sandbox's 12th batch.

==== Others ====
- Jasper Cho as Alex Kwon

One of the mentors at Sandbox's 12th batch and the owner of 2STO, a Silicon Valley company.

- Kang You-seok as Shin Hyeon

A computer programmer, Shin Jeong's twin brother.

- Joo Bo-Young as Shin Jeong

A computer programmer, Shin Hyeon's twin sister.

- Kim Ji-in as Seo-hyun

=== Special appearances ===
- Kim Joo-hun as Seo Chung-myung (ep1)

Seo Dal-mi's and Won In-jae's father. Having had enough of being degraded at work, he decides to start his own business, which leads to his divorce and after a year, he manages to get a deal and it is implied that he inspired the name "Sandbox" during a chat with the owner who happens to be the current "Sandbox" CEO Yoon Seon-hak. On the very same day, while going home he dies in the bus due to brain injuries from an earlier car accident.

- Yang Dae-hyuk as Yoon Byung-soo (ep9-10)
- Yeo Jin-goo as Jang Young-shil (voice) / Hong Ji-seok (ep16)
- Lee Bo-young as woman at pub
- Moon Se-yoon as security guard
- Park Chan-ho as Nam Do-san's favorite baseball athlete
- Bae Hae-sun as Lee Hye-won, team leader at Seonju Life Insurance.

== Original soundtrack ==
Start-Up OST

Soundtrack album by Various artists
- Released: 2020
- Genre: Soundtrack
- Languages: Korean; English
- Label: VLENDING

Music director Park Se-joon oversaw the drama's OST.

=== Part 1 ===
Released on October 17, 2020
No.	Title	Lyrics	Music	Artist	Length
1.	"Future" (미래)	Taibian; Park Se-joon	Taibian; Bark; YESY	Red Velvet	3:36
2.	"Future" (Inst.)		Taibian; Bark; YESY		3:36
Total length:					7:12

=== Part 2 ===
Released on October 18, 2020
No.	Title	Lyrics	Music	Artist	Length
1.	"Day & Night" (낮과 밤)	Taibian; Park Se-joon	Seo Dong-hwan; Jung Seung-hwan	Jung Seung-hwan	4:21
2.	"Day & Night" (Inst.)		Seo Dong-hwan; Jung Seung-hwan		4:21
Total length:					8:42

=== Part 3 ===
Released on October 24, 2020
No.	Title	Lyrics	Music	Artist	Length
1.	"One Day" (어느 날 우리)	Hwang Seok-joo; Han Joon; Park Se-joon	Seo Jae-ha; Kim Young-sung; Park Se-joon	Kim Feel	4:00
2.	"One Day" (Inst.)		Seo Jae-ha; Kim Young-sung; Park Se-joon		4:00
Total length:					8:00

=== Part 4 ===
Released on October 25, 2020
No.	Title	Lyrics	Music	Artist	Length
1.	"I Know" (알아요)	Choi Ji-san; Han Kyung-soo; Lee Hyun-sang; Park Se-joon	Han Kyung-soo; Choi Ji-san; Choi Han-sol; Kim Hwan; VioletK	Oh My Girl (Seunghee, Jiho, Binnie)	3:18
2.	"I Know" (Inst.)		Han Kyung-soo; Choi Ji-san; Choi Han-sol; Kim Hwan; VioletK		3:18
Total length:					6:36

=== Part 5 ===
Released on October 30, 2020
No.	Title	Lyrics	Music	Artist	Length
1.	"Running" (달리기)	Yoon Kyung-won; Choi Seul-gi; Ahn Ji-soo; Park Se-joon	CR Kim; Kim Soo-bin (Aiming); Lee Seung-hyun (Aiming); Kim Dong-young	Gaho	3:18
2.	"Running" (Inst.)		CR Kim; Kim Soo-bin (Aiming); Lee Seung-hyun (Aiming); Kim Dong-young		3:18
Total length:					6:36

=== Part 6 ===
Released on October 31, 2020
No.	Title	Lyrics	Music	Artist	Length
1.	"Where Is Dream" (꿈은 어디에)	Taibian; Park Se-joon	Taibian; Bark; YESY	10cm	3:04
2.	"Where Is Dream" (Inst.)		Taibian; Bark; YESY		3:04
Total length:					6:08

=== Part 7 ===
Released on November 1, 2020
No.	Title	Lyrics	Music	Artist	Length
1.	"My Love"	Captain Planet; Han Kyung-soo; Park Se-joon	Captain Planet; Han Kyung-soo	Davichi	3:17
2.	"My Love" (Inst.)		Captain Planet; Han Kyung-soo		3:17
Total length:					6:34

=== Part 8 ===
Released on November 7, 2020
No.	Title	Lyrics	Music	Artist	Length
1.	"Even For A Moment" (우연히 잠시라도)	Captain Planet; Han Kyung-soo; Park Se-joon	Captain Planet; Han Kyung-soo	Cheeze	3:50
2.	"Even For A Moment" (Inst.)		Captain Planet; Han Kyung-soo		3:50
Total length:					7:40

=== Part 9 ===
Released on November 8, 2020
No.	Title	Lyrics	Music	Artist	Length
1.	"Blue Bird" (파랑새)	Han Kyung-soo; Park Se-joon	Han Kyung-soo; Kang Woo-jin; Lee Jung-woo; Choi Min-joon; VioletK	Ailee	3:47
2.	"Blue Bird" (Inst.)		Han Kyung-soo; Kang Woo-jin; Lee Jung-woo; Choi Min-joon; VioletK		3:47
Total length:					7:34

=== Part 10 ===
Released on November 14, 2020
No.	Title	Lyrics	Music	Artist	Length
1.	"Lonesome Diary" (어른 일기)	Taibian; Park Se-joon	Taibian; Bark; YESY	Sandeul (B1A4)	3:59
2.	"Lonesome Diary" (Inst.)		Taibian; Bark; YESY		3:59
Total length:					7:58

=== Part 11 ===
Released on November 15, 2020
No.	Title	Lyrics	Music	Artist	Length
1.	"Two Words" (두 글자)	Han Joon; Park Se-joon	Han Kyung-soo; Choi Han-sol; VioletK	Wendy (Red Velvet)	3:53
2.	"Two Words" (Inst.)		Han Kyung-soo; Choi Han-sol; VioletK		3:53
Total length:					7:46

=== Part 12 ===
Released on November 21, 2020
No.	Title	Lyrics	Music	Artist	Length
1.	"Love Letter"	Misung; Kim Jung-woo (TOXIC); Yoari; Park Se-joon	Kim Jung-woo (TOXIC); Yoari; Misung; Choi Seul-gi	Bolbbalgan4	3:09
2.	"Love Letter" (Inst.)		Kim Jung-woo (TOXIC); Yoari; Misung; Choi Seul-gi		3:09
Total length:					6:18

=== Part 13 ===
Released on November 21, 2020
No.	Title	Lyrics	Music	Artist	Length
1.	"Dream" (상상한 꿈)	Lee Hyun-sang; Dope'Doug; Park Se-joon	Han Kyung-soo; Choi Ji-san; Mats Tärnfors	Jamie	3:33
2.	"Dream" (Inst.)		Han Kyung-soo; Choi Ji-san; Mats Tärnfors		3:33
Total length:					7:06

=== Part 14 ===
Released on November 28, 2020
No.	Title	Lyrics	Music	Artist	Length
1.	"My Dear Love" (내 사랑)	Han Joon; Park Se-joon	Lee Yoo-jin; Park Se-joon	Bae Suzy	4:02
2.	"My Dear Love" (Inst.)		Lee Yoo-jin; Park Se-joon		4:02
Total length:					8:04

=== Part 15 ===
Released on November 29, 2020
No.	Title	Lyrics	Music	Artist	Length
1.	"Love Me Like You Used To" (날 사랑한 처음의 너로 돌아와)	Kassy	Cho Young-soo	Kassy	3:37
2.	"Love Me Like You Used To" (Inst.)		Cho Young-soo		3:37
Total length:					7:14

=== Part 16 ===
Released on December 5, 2020
No.	Title	Lyrics	Music	Artist	Length
1.	"To Me" (혼잣말)	Han Joon; Park Se-joon	Kim Young-sung; Seo Jae-ha; Park Se-joon	Jung Eun-ji (Apink)	3:52
2.	"To Me" (Inst.)		Kim Young-sung; Seo Jae-ha; Park Se-joon		3:52
Total length:					7:44

=== Part 17 ===
Released on December 6, 2020
No.	Title	Lyrics	Music	Artist	Length
1.	"Care About You" (너 하나만 바라볼 사람)	CR Kim; Kim Soo-bin (Aiming); Park Se-joon	CR Kim; Kim Soo-bin (Aiming); Choi Seul-gi	K.Will	3:28
2.	"Care About You" (Inst.)		CR Kim; Kim Soo-bin (Aiming); Choi Seul-gi		3:28
Total length:					6:56

== Episodes ==
No.	Title	Directed by	Written by	Original release date
1	"Start-Up"	Oh Choong-hwan	Park Hye-ryun	October 17, 2020
15 years ago, Seo Dal-mi (Heo Jung-eun) and Seo In-jae (Lee Re)'s parents, Cha Ah-hyeon (Song Seon-mi) and Seo Chung-myung (Kim Joo-hun) were divorced. Dal-mi stayed with Chung-myung, who started his own company after resigning, which had resulted in the divorce. Meanwhile, Ah-hyun remarried and took In-jae with her to the US, assuming the surname Won from her stepfather. Choi Won-deok (Kim Hae-sook), Dal-mi and In-jae's grandmother, a corn dog shop owner, gave shelter to young Ji-pyeong (Nam Da-reum), an orphan and winner of a virtual investment competition. With his help, Won-deok opened a bank account. As Dal-mi felt lonely, her grandmother made Ji-pyeong write letters to Dal-mi under the pen name Nam Do-san (Nam Joo-hyuk) a winner of the Mathematics Olympiad. Both exchanged letters until Ji-pyeong moved to Seoul. In the meantime, Ji-pyeong made Won-deok's money, unknowingly to her, tenfold from his gig at stock investments. Chung-myung successfully secured an investment for his startup but afterwards died from injuries sustained by a car crash on his way to the pitching. In the present, Ji-pyeong (Kim Seon-ho) and In-jae (Kang Han-na) are guest lecturers at an event hosted by Sandbox, where Dal-mi (Bae Suzy) is one of the attendees. In-jae invites Dal-mi to a 'Networking Event' with Do-san, to prove that her choice of going off with her mother was right. Ji-pyeong, now a successful venture capitalist reunites with Won-deok. The episode ends at Samsan Tech, where the real Nam Do-san (Nam Joo-hyuk) successfully programs his optical image recognition software.
2	"Family, Friends, Fools"	Oh Choong-hwan	Park Hye-ryun	October 18, 2020
Dal-mi, who still believes Nam Do-san actually wrote her letters 15 years ago, is determined to find him and prove to her sister that she too lives a good life. Won-deok, still concealing Ji-pyeong's identity to her, asks him to find the real Nam Do-san, who now co-owns a startup company called Samsan Tech with Kim Yong-san and Lee Chul-san. Do-San's parents withdraw their investment after discovering a bug in his visual recognition software. To recoup the lost money, he puts a baseball signed by Park Chan-ho for sale. Dal-mi, discovering the item online, arranges with him to meet at Sandbox but was stopped by Ji-pyeong, who gives letters written by her (addressed to Do-san) to him. At the office of Samsan Tech, Ji-pyeong requests him to meet Dal-mi at the networking event, but he asks Ji-Pyeong in return to let Samsan Tech be a part of "Sandbox", a deal that Ji-pyeong refuses. Do-san shows up anyway and finally meets Dal-mi. The episode ends with Samsan Tech winning the CODA competition in the US.
3	"Angel"	Oh Choong-hwan	Park Hye-ryun	October 24, 2020
Dal-mi meets her mother again for the first time since the divorce, this time with Do-san who successfully impresses her with the help of Ji-pyeong. Do-san reveals his interest in Dal-mi and decides to keep in contact with her. Due to his inexperience with women, Ji-pyeong asks Do-san to forward him every single message he receives from Dal-mi. When Dal-mi says she wants to visit Do-san at his office, Ji-pyeong creates a makeshift office in his dining room to make a good impression for her. Dal-mi reveals that she quit her job and wants to start her own company, just like Do-san did. Meanwhile, Ah-hyun suspects that Sang-su, In-Jae's stepbrother, can potentially oust her daughter as the CEO for the family company. In-jae is forced to control its operation in the US, but she refuses and resigns. The episode ends with the Do-san family watching Samsan Tech's victory speech for the CODA competition in embarrassment, but Alex Kwon shows interest in them.
4	"Sandbox"	Oh Choong-hwan	Park Hye-ryun	October 25, 2020
Dal-mi bumps into Do-san at a bookstore and makes plans for what is supposed to be his birthday, as written in Ji-pyeong's letters to her. Ji-pyeong once again intervenes by turning his dining room into an office for Samsan Tech. Samsan Tech's real office is flooded with potential investors after hearing their company winning the CODA competition. In-jae manages to recruit a few colleagues from her former business to join her startup. Her mom initially disagrees, but eventually warms up to the idea. At Sandbox's 12th hackathon, Do-san's real identity is revealed and In-jae invites Samsan Tech to join her team. Dal-mi also wants to be their CEO and Do-san chooses her over In-jae. The episode ends with the CEO of Sandbox, Yoon Seon-hak, reading In-jae's application which reminds her of In-jae's father, who pitched her his business in the first episode and named the platform as Sandbox.
5	"Hackathon"	Oh Choong-hwan	Park Hye-ryun	October 31, 2020
Ji-pyeong asks his secretary Dong-cheong to replace him as a mentor at the Hackathon, yet keeps supervising Samsan Tech's progress. Being one team member short, Dal-mi recruits Sa-ha, with whom she once picked a fight over a Sandbox interview practice book at the bookstore, as her designer. They aim to build a machine learning program that can detect fake handwritings, an idea then stolen by In-jae's team as a program that makes handwritings. Before the presentation, Ji-pyeong tells the San boys that he will invest in their company if they fail to enter Sandbox. During In-jae's presentation, her father suggests they test Samsan Tech's with their program, but the handwriting passes the detection. Despite that, both of them are allowed to enter Sandbox. At the end of the episode, Alex Kwon, one of the judges from CODA's competition and also the hackathon, meets Do-san's parents. During the hackathon judgment round, Alex pitches for Samsan Tech to enter Sandbox.
6	"Key Man"	Oh Choong-hwan	Park Hye-ryun	November 1, 2020
Do-san finally manages to correct his program that can detect the fake handwritings generated by Injae Company. At the mentor selection, Seon-hak chooses Injae company as their mentor after In-jae identifies herself as the girl on the swing, which is now the logo of Sandbox. Despite interest from Alex Kwon, Dal-mi picks Ji-pyeong as their mentor. At a due diligence process with Ji-pyeong, Yong-san and Chul-san leave because of a disagreement on who gets to hold the most shares. At night, Chul-san and Yong-san reminisce how they joined Do-san's company. Both eventually agree to give up their shares. Ji-pyeong tells Dal-mi to make up a decision as the CEO, even if it can't make everyone happy. Dal-mi finally decides that Do-san holds the majority share and everyone else gets a smaller portion. At the end of the episode, an unknown figure writes the word 'Revenge' and attaches it to the board during the Hackathon. The same person ties a flower at a bridge where someone jumped off the bridge there, with Seon-hak witnessing the incident. The figure steps into Sandbox and stops between the doors of Samsan Tech and Injae company.
7	"Burn Rate"	Oh Choong-hwan	Park Hye-ryun	November 7, 2020
After Dal-mi proposed the share of each Samsan Tech's employee to Ji-pyeong, Do-san decides to tell the truth about the letters by visiting Won-daek, Dal-mi's grandmother. Ji-pyeong drives over to stop him and they both decide to stay silent about the letters. When the two become competitive in front of Dal-mi and Won-daek, Do-san accuses Ji-pyeong of being jealous. Grappling with his feelings for Dal-mi, Ji-pyeong then avoids her. Injae Company receives an investment of 300 million Won from Jeonghan bank. Knowing that Dal-mi is jealous, In-jae offers her an AI project from her father at the Morning Group. At the meeting, Dal-mi and Do-san learn that the project involves them doing work for part-time salary, in exchange for experience at Morning Group. Outraged by Doo-jung's insult to Dal-mi, Do-san breaks his glass name tag into pieces and they both walk out. Ultimately, they agree to pursue Do-san's project: an image recognition software with sound for the blind, inspired after Won-daek reveals to Do-san that she is going blind. Won-daek asks whether Dal-mi prefers the old Do-san (Ji-pyeong 15 years ago) or the now Do-san. Dal-mi replies that she is still getting to know the now Do-san, but there are moments that excite her. Later they have one of those moments on the roof-top.
8	"Backup"	Oh Choong-hwan	Park Hye-ryun	November 8, 2020
After consulting with a blind employee at Sandbox, Samsan Tech determines to enhance their image recognition app to include voice queries generated by Yeong-sil, a voice assistant, later renaming the app as NoonGil. Ji-pyeong is unconvinced because the app will be more expensive to operate the more people use it, but Dal-mi invokes the words on the letters he wrote her to move his heart. He finally gives her a list of companies that do CSR projects for the blind so that Samsan Tech can find potential investors. While meeting with the companies, Dal-mi ends up in Gapyeong and Ji-pyeong finds her. Despite initially low download numbers and ratings from the app that disappoints the rest of the team, Do-san's cousin taps in baseball athlete Park Chan-ho to market it. Dal-mi finally finds out about her grandmother going blind. Do-san meets with Morning Group to settle for his rage incident, while Dal-mi ends up there too with In-jae in a last effort to find funding. Dal-mi threatens to leak a recording of their last meeting to the press unless they settle by giving their CSR funds to Samsan Tech. While reviewing her proposal written with feedback from Ji-pyeong, she notices that his handwriting is the same as the letters she received 15 years ago. Ji-pyeong sees Do-san leaving Sandbox and gives him Dal-mi's hair tie to return to her, to which Do-san becomes jealous.
9	"Risk"	Oh Choong-hwan	Park Hye-ryun	November 14, 2020
A man shows up to Sandbox and throws an egg at In-jae after a company using her software caused the security department to be fired. Do-san's parents are furious after seeing an interview of Woon-jung about Samsan Tech, who mentions Dal-mi, not Do-san, as the CEO. Being drunk, Do-san is brought by Ji-pyeong to Dal-mi's house, where Dal-mi offers Do-san to stay for the night, but Ji-pyeong joins too. The next day, Do-san takes Dal-mi and her grandmother to the beach. As Do-san goes home and is confronted by his parents, he admits that he won the high school mathematics Olympiad by cheating. The guilt caused him to give his gold medal to another participant. Meeting Won-deok, Ji-pyeong confesses to her that he has feelings for Dal-mi. As requested by Won-deok, Ji-pyeong travels back to Seonju to pick up the last letter Dal-mi wrote to him at the birdhouse, but she coincidentally shows up and finds out the truth.
10	"Demo Day"	Oh Choong-hwan	Park Hye-ryun	November 15, 2020
Do-san finds Dal-mi and they cry together while he explains why he kept lying. Ji-pyeong finally admits that he wrote the letters and his feelings for Dal-mi. When Dal-mi confronts In-jae for claiming to be 'the girl on the swing', Do-san intervenes to defend her. Ji-pyeong tells the Samsan Tech team that he will support them should they fail the Demo Day, and does not want Dal-mi to worry. After telling Dal-mi to forget everything she thought about him before, Do-san approaches Alex Kwon, who had approached him to offer him a job at his company 2STO. Yong-san shoves Ji-pyeong while asking about why his intense questioning during Demo Day for Sandbox's 2nd residency caused his older brother to commit suicide. Meanwhile, having her money cut off from her husband in retaliation of In-jae's resignation from Nature Morning, Ah-hyun has been desperately trying to save money and looking for a new job, including at Won-deok's corn dog stand. At the end of the episode, Ji-pyeong encounters the same stranger who sat with Dal-mi earlier.
11	"Exit"	Oh Choong-hwan	Park Hye-ryun	November 21, 2020
Do-san approaches Alex and begs him to acquire all the employees of Samsan Tech, but he tells Do-san that Injae Company is also in his consideration. Ji-pyeong finds out about Yong-san's older brother, who was at the demo day presenting his company called Charging Partner. Out of guilt, he is not present for judgment at the current Demo Day. There, In-jae demonstrates an AI that predicts crimes before they happen on CCTVs. Do-San's father amongst the audience confronts her as the AI costs him his job. She defends herself by using his son's entrance into Sandbox to justify her reason. Dal-mi on behalf of Samsan Tech introduces NoonGil. Alex asks both companies for a duel of their optical image recognition technology using single-board computers, in which Samsan Tech prevails. Do-san shows Dal-mi his real office before their move to Sandbox, but there they run into Chul-san and Sa-ha. That night, Dal-mi proposes a self-driving car as their next venture. Meanwhile, Alex hands them a deal to acquire Samsan Tech for three billion won, with a contingency that they work for 3 years in Silicon Valley. Ji-pyeong, hearing the news, attempts to stop the deal, as he sees this as an acqhire, but he is too late.
12	"Acqhire"	Oh Choong-hwan	Park Hye-ryun	November 22, 2020
Samsan Tech is acqhired by 2STO. The next day Dal-Mi and Sa-ha are fired as according to the contract, they will recruit only the engineers from Samsan Tech. Yong-san reveals them the truth about his brother and Ji-pyeong, which is the reason he prevented Ji-pyeong from calling Dal-mi to stop the deal. Upon Ji-pyeong telling them that there is nothing they can do now and that NoonGil will be dissolved, Do-san picks a fight with him. After the fight, Do-san pleas with him to help Samsan tech and reveals that Won-deok is going blind, the reason behind the inception of NoonGil. Ji-pyeong goes to Won-deok and cries seeing her use NoonGil. Afterwards, he runs into Dal-mi and they have dinner together, Dal-mi asking for his advice. During a date on his birthday, Do-san tells Dal-mi that he has found a way to cancel the acquisition, but she intentionally shows disinterest, urging him to leave for San Francisco to pursue his dream. Feeling guilty for Dal-mi, In-jae admits to Seon-hak that she is not 'the girl on the swing'. Seon-hak talks to Dal-mi about her father and his final day. Dal-mi applies to be a strategic planning manager at Injae Company. Ji-pyeong and Do-san negotiate with Alex to continue their work with NoonGil. At the end of the episode, after the breakup, Do-san walks and cries profusely following a recitation of Dal-mi's letters.
13	"Comfort Zone"	Oh Choong-hwan	Park Hye-ryun	November 28, 2020
Dal-mi is accepted into Injae Company as their COO, after she recited In-jae's words once also said by their father about him resigning to pursue new innovations that can eventually make old technologies and human work obsolete. Since the acquisition, NoonGil continues to be developed to include identification of medicine pills, while Dal-mi is later recruited as the CEO of Cheongmyeong Company, a subsidiary of Injae Company, and the Morning Group expands to be the largest AI team in South Korea. Meanwhile, Won-deok sells her corndog food truck. Three years later, Dal-mi is working with In-jae to develop a self-driving car. Dal-mi and Ji-pyeong have grown closer while Sa-ha has trouble committing to any new relationships. Do-san, Chul-san, and Yong-san return to South Korea for a vacation at the end of their 3-year contract at 2STO. Ji-pyeong decides now is the time for him to take the next step in his relationship with Dal-mi, but then bumps into Do-san. Sa-ha runs into Chul-san and Yong-san. Suddenly, Cheongmyeong is hit by a ransomware and Dal-mi calls Sa-ha for help. She then receives a call from an unknown number which turns out to be Do-san. He, Yong-san, Chul-san, and Sa-ha arrive at Sandbox to decrypt the data. Unable to resolve the ransomware, two of Cheongmyeong's programmers resign. Do-san, Chul-san, and Yong-san choose not to renew their contract with 2STO and stay in South Korea. In an epilogue scene, Do-san is shown driving with his mother as he received a call from Chul-san about a ransomware attack at Dal-mi's company and then called her.
14	"Elevator Speech"	Oh Choong-hwan	Park Hye-ryun	November 29, 2020
Dal-mi, still shocked with Do-san's arrival, is comforted by Ji-pyeong. Do-san is about to meet her to pick up his left behind coat, but is stopped by Ji-pyeong. Do-san, Chul-san and Yong-san reestablish Samsan Tech and interview with a magazine. Dal-mi's autonomous car is about to apply for a permit, but another car named Momo, developed by the Morning Group, is revealed to have already obtained a permit. In-jae storms the Morning Group building to confront Sang-su about recruiting two of her programmers and asks Dal-mi to recruit the developers from Samsan Tech. Dal-mi refuses, but In-jae threatens to fire her. At their office, Dal-mi asks Samsan Tech to join, but Do-san refuses and says he does not want to see her again. Trying to forget Dal-mi, Do-san escapes to his uncle's cabin outside Seoul, but Dal-mi manages to find him that night. Chul-san meets Sa-ha again in an attempt to recruit her, while Yong-san meets Seon-hak for advice on investors. Yong-san then meets Ji-pyeong and tells him that he wants honest advice. Finally, Dal-mi's autonomous car Tarzan launches on a test drive for a temporary permit application. Meanwhile, Ah-hyeon reveals she is divorced and In-jae calls her lawyer to give up her adoption rights. At the end of the episode, Dal-mi shows up to Do-san's house while he was away to give his left behind jacket. After they reconcile, Do-san states he wishes to buy Cheongmyeong Company.
15	"MVP (Minimum Viable Product)"	Oh Choong-hwan	Park Hye-ryun	December 5, 2020
At the test drive, Yong-san and Chul-san reveal they rewrote the original program written by Cheongmyeong's former developers. The car successfully performs and obtains the permit. In-jae wants to submit the permit for a smart city project bid, but Dal-mi disagrees, as she is unconfident of winning it. Do-san, Ji-pyeong, and Dal-mi are awkwardly stuck in an elevator together when it temporarily breaks. Do-san asks Dal-mi to try pursuing the bid despite only a slim chance of winning and rejection from Ji-pyeong, but leaves the final decision to her. Ji-pyeong asks Do-san to give his letters from Dal-mi back, but he refuses. Ji-pyeong meets him at his house to demand the letters but drinks with him and his parents to buy time. Do-san and Ji-pyeong have a heart to heart while drunk and Ji-pyeong tells Do-san to see who Dal-mi really loves. Ji-pyeong tries to avoid Dal-mi and says it as they bump into each other. Ultimately, Dal-mi decides to enter the bid. Sa-ha approaches Chul-san and says she wants to have a relationship with him under two circumstances which Chul-san agrees to. Chul-san gets jealous when Yong-san plays anagram with her to figure out who was behind the ransomware attack. Do-san stumbles upon the name Apollon Artemis circled among the possible combinations. Ah-hyeon uses the divorce money to rent a place for a corn dog business with nearly blind Won-deok. Doo-jung plans to ruin Cheongmyeong's chance to win the bid in retaliation for the divorce by asking a reporter through his son Sang-soo, to write about their ransomware attack they suffered with. In an epilogue scene, Do-san tells Dal-mi that during his tenure at 2STO, he volunteered to work on the self-driving car after Dal-mi's idea at their last meeting with Samsan Tech.
16	"Scale Up"	Oh Choong-hwan	Park Hye-ryun	December 6, 2020
Do-san stumbles upon the term Apollon Artemis (Apollo and Artemis, gods from Greek myth who are twins) in the ransomware, which he recalls as Sin-heong and Sin-jeong, the former developers of Injae Company. Dong-chun meets a reporter and gives Ji-pyeong his business card, who tells him that the reporter always writes articles attacking start-ups unless given a stock in their company. Ji-pyeong runs to their office to stop the interview, but In-jae tells him that she is confident that they can outsmart the reporter. They tell the reporter they already have the names of the perpetrators of the ransomware attack and the mastermind, Sang-su, who are arrested by the police. The reporter no longer teams up with the saboteur. During the bidding day for the autonomous car system at the DQ smart city, they pass as one of the finalists. The friends all give different promises that could be borderline ludicrous if they win the bid, and Do-san says he will propose which surprises Dal-mi. During a lecture by Doo-jung, In-jae confronts him with the withdrawal of her adoption rights and announces her name reversal to Seo In-jae. She finally meets Won-deok for the first time since her departure to the US at her old home and shows the revocation of her adoption. During her visit, Won-deok tells Ji-pyeong to always call or visit her even when he is doing well. Ji-pyeong comes across a company that provides aids for orphans in the same situation he was once in and personally invests. Ji-pyeong also runs into Dal-mi and tells her that the Nam Do-san in the letters are not him, as he hadn't looked for her during the 15 years, yet Do-san met her the first day he read them. Dal-mi aspires to scale up so In-jae asks Seon-hak on behalf of her to look for an investor, which she forwards to Ji-pyeong. He meets with Do-san to state his intention to invest, which he accepts. Dal-mi is shown presenting at the bid. In an epilogue scene, fast forward to 2020, Dal-mi and Do-san are still the CEO and CTO of Cheongmyeong Company, respectively. Pictures show them married, signaling that they won the bid. In-jae and Ji-pyeong are also still part of the company, ending with all four on their way to a shareholder meeting.

== Reception ==
=== Critical reception ===
The South China Morning Post ranked it #10 on its list of "The top 10 K-dramas of 2020". Kim Jae-ha of Teen Vogue including it on the list of the "11 Best K-Dramas of 2020" said that "Start-Up reinforces the idea that no matter how fractured a family is, the ties remain – for better or worse" .

=== Viewership ===
The series logged 4.5% in viewership rating for its first episode.

Start-Up : South Korea viewers per episode (thousands)

Season	Episode number																Average
Season	1	2	3	4	5	6	7	8	9	10	11	12	13	14	15	16	Average
1	1211	1155	1155	1381	1415	1291	1318	1310	1256	1120	1287	1308	1255	1349	1355	1336	1206

Source: Audience measurement performed nationwide by Nielsen Korea.

Average TV viewership ratings
Ep.	Part	Original broadcast date	Average audience share (Nielsen Korea)	
Ep.	Part	Original broadcast date	Nationwide	Seoul
1	1	October 17, 2020	4.278% (2nd)	4.416% (2nd)
1	2	October 17, 2020	4.495% (1st)	4.553% (1st)
2	1	October 18, 2020	4.208% (2nd)	4.585% (2nd)
2	2	October 18, 2020	4.361% (1st)	4.666% (1st)
3	1	October 24, 2020	4.789% (1st)	5.383% (1st)
3	2	October 24, 2020	4.468% (2nd)	5.042% (2nd)
4	1	October 25, 2020	4.334% (2nd)	4.761% (2nd)
4	2	October 25, 2020	5.010% (1st)	5.696% (1st)
5	1	October 31, 2020	4.274% (2nd)	4.861% (2nd)
5	2	October 31, 2020	5.424% (1st)	6.061% (1st)
6	1	November 1, 2020	4.136% (2nd)	4.257% (3rd)
6	2	November 1, 2020	4.741% (1st)	4.880% (1st)
7	1	November 7, 2020	4.521% (2nd)	5.227% (2nd)
7	2	November 7, 2020	5.065% (1st)	5.952% (1st)
8	1	November 8, 2020	4.021% (4th)	4.113% (2nd)
8	2	November 8, 2020	4.544% (1st)	5.031% (1st)
9	1	November 14, 2020	4.879% (2nd)	5.718% (2nd)
9	2	November 14, 2020	5.145% (1st)	5.946% (1st)
10	1	November 15, 2020	4.154% (2nd)	4.433% (2nd)
10	2	November 15, 2020	4.352% (1st)	4.839% (1st)
11	1	November 21, 2020	4.130% (2nd)	4.582% (2nd)
11	2	November 21, 2020	4.799% (1st)	5.462% (1st)
12	1	November 22, 2020	4.270% (2nd)	4.814% (2nd)
12	2	November 22, 2020	5.079% (1st)	5.671% (1st)
13	1	November 28, 2020	4.666% (2nd)	5.278% (2nd)
13	2	November 28, 2020	5.151% (1st)	6.023% (1st)
14	1	November 29, 2020	4.573% (2nd)	5.041% (2nd)
14	2	November 29, 2020	5.255% (1st)	6.055% (1st)
15	1	December 5, 2020	4.382% (3rd)	4.357% (3rd)
15	2	December 5, 2020	4.980% (2nd)	5.483% (2nd)
16	1	December 6, 2020	4.841% (3rd)	5.178% (3rd)
16	2	December 6, 2020	5.187% (2nd)	5.415% (2nd)
Average			4.628%	5.115%
In the table above, the blue numbers represent the lowest ratings and the red numbers represent the highest ratings.; This drama airs on a cable channel/pay TV which normally has a relatively smaller audience compared to free-to-air TV/public broadcasters (KBS, SBS, MBC and EBS).

== Adaptation ==
In March 2022, it was announced that GMA Network will produce a Philippine adaptation of the series, whose working title is Start-Up PH, starring Bea Alonzo, in her first television series in GMA Network, and Alden Richards.

Thailand also produced a remake on True network called Start-Up like the original.

== Awards and nominations ==
Award ceremony	Year	Category	Nominee / Work	Result	Ref.
Baeksang Arts Awards	2021	Best Supporting Actor (TV)	Kim Seon-ho	Nominated	
Baeksang Arts Awards	2021	Most Popular Actor	Kim Seon-ho	Won	
Korea First Brand Awards (Note: The Korea First Brand Awards is hosted by the Korea Consumer Brand Committee and the Korea Consumer Forum. Awards are based on a nationwide survey held in South Korea.)	2020	Actress of the Year	Bae Suzy	Won	
Seoul International Drama Awards	2021	Outstanding Korean Drama	Start-Up	Won	
Seoul International Drama Awards	2021	Outstanding Korean Actor	Nam Joo-hyuk	Nominated	
Seoul International Drama Awards	2021	Outstanding Korean Actress	Bae Suzy	Won	
Seoul International Drama Awards	2021	Character of the Year	Han Ji-pyeong; Kim Seon-ho	Won	
