= Park Hye-ryun =

South Korean screenwriter

- 박혜련
- Born: South Korea
- Occupation: Screenwriter
- Years active: 2005-present
- Organization(s): Korea Television and Radio Writers Association (KTRWA)
- Agent(s): C.A.M.P Entertainment; Baram Pictures (Note: A subsidiary of Kakao M)

Korean name
- Hangul: 박혜련
- Hanja: 朴惠蓮
- RR: Bak Hyeryeon
- MR: Pak Hyeryŏn

Park Hye-ryun (Korean: 박혜련) is a South Korean screenwriter. She is known for her writing of the popular Korean television dramas Dream High (2011), I Can Hear Your Voice (2013), Pinocchio (2014-2015), While You Were Sleeping (2017), and Start-Up (2020).

She is a member of Korea Television and Radio Writers Association (KTRWA). In 2017 it was reported that she was affiliated with C.A.M.P Entertainment.

== Career ==
Park Hye-ryun debuted as writer in MBC's 'Theme Game'. Park Hye-ryun made a name for herself by writing sitcom scripts for 'New Nonstop', 'Nonstop 3', and 'Nonstop 5', collaborating with Director Kim Min-sik.

She further showcased her talent as a writer and scriptwriter in projects such as 'Not Alone', 'Kimchi Cheese Smile', and 'Get Karl! Oh Soo-jung'. She wrote the screenplay for the movie Hellcats (2008).

However, it was KBS 2TV's 'Dream High' in 2011 that brought her public recognition.

The relationship between writer Park Hye-ryeon and Lee Jong-seok was established during drama SBS' 'I Can Hear Your Voice' in 2013. In this series, Park Hye-ryun blended fantasy and courtroom drama to create a story revolving around a boy with mind-reading abilities and a lawyer. She was praised for the flawless story development, tight dialogue and setting, and surprising twists and turns in each episode. She received the presidential citation for the '2013 Korea Content Grand Prize' for drama I Can Hear Your Voice.

On September 30, 2013, IHQ announced that they recently signed a drama production contract with Park Hye-ryun. Later, Lee Jong-seok reunited in with Park Hye-ryun in SBS's 'Pinocchio', released two years later. Portraying the character of Choi Dal-po, he left a lasting impression on the audience.

Park Hye-ryun and Lee Jong-seok collaborated once again. In November 2016, iHQ announced that Park Hye-ryun would be making her comeback with the drama 'While You Were Sleeping' (working title), and Lee Jong-seok's casting was confirmed for the project. Female lead Suzy. She returned with a new narrative featuring a woman and a prosecutor who possessed the ability to foresee the future.

== Filmography ==
=== Film ===
Year	Title		Credited as	Ref.
Year	English	Korean	Credited as	Ref.
2008	Hellcats	뜨거운 것이 좋아	Co-author	

=== Television ===
Title		Broadcaster and timeslot	Broadcast period	Episodes	Average rating^{✝}
English	Korean	Broadcaster and timeslot	Broadcast period	Episodes	Average rating^{✝}
Nonstop 5	논스톱5	MBC, Monday-Friday 18:50	October 4, 2004 - October 21, 2005	257	—N/a
Not Alone	혼자가 아니야	SBS, Monday 20:50	October 11, 2004 - February 21, 2005	18	—N/a
Stranger than Paradise	천국보다 낯선	SBS, Monday-Tuesday 21:55	July 31 - September 19, 2006	16	3.6%
Get Karl! Oh Soo-jung	칼잡이 오수정	SBS, Saturday-Sunday 21:45	July 28 - September 16, 2007	16	13.3%
Kimchi Cheese Smile	김치 치즈 스마일	MBC, Monday-Friday 20:20	July 23, 2007 - January 18, 2008	121	7.8%
Dream High	드림하이	KBS2, Monday-Tuesday 21:55	January 3 - February 28, 2011	16	15.7%
I Can Hear Your Voice	너의 목소리가 들려	SBS, Wednesday-Thursday 21:55	June 5 - August 1, 2013	18	18.8%
Pinocchio	피노키오	SBS, Wednesday-Thursday 21:55	November 12, 2014 – January 15, 2015	20	10.6%
Page Turner	페이지 터너	KBS2, Saturday 22:35	March 26 - April 9, 2016	3	4.0%
While You Were Sleeping	당신이 잠든 사이에	SBS, Wednesday-Thursday 22:00	September 27 - November 16, 2017	32	8.3%
Start-Up	스타트업	tvN, Saturday-Sunday 21:40	October 17 – December 6, 2020	16	4.6%
Castaway Diva	무인도의 디바	tvN, Saturday-Sunday 21:20	October 28 – December 3, 2023	12	6.7%

^✝ From AGB Nielsen nationwide ratings

== Accolades ==
=== Awards and nominations ===
Award	Year	Category	Recipient	Result	Ref.
MBC Broadcasting Entertainment Awards	2002	Best Writer	Nonstop 3	Won	
4th Korea Drama Awards	2011	Best Writer	Dream High	Nominated	
6th Korea Drama Awards	2013	Best Writer	I Can Hear Your Voice	Nominated	

=== State honors ===
State honor
Country	Award Ceremony	Year	Honor	Ref.
South Korea (Note: Honors are given at the Korean Content Awards (대한민국 콘텐츠 대상) arranged by the Korea Creative Content Agency and hosted by the Ministry of Culture, Sports and Tourism. The 2022 Korea Content Awards Ceremony , which started in 2009 and celebrated its 14th this year, aims to inspire pride in the content industry and develop the Korean cultural content industry by discovering and awarding contributors and excellent content that have contributed to the development of the content industry in 2022. It is a place to promote. The winners (works) of honor, which are recommended through the website of the Korea Creative Content Agency (www.kocca.kr) and announced through careful examination by experts and three-step verification, play a leading role in shining the Korean content industry in the world.)	4th Korean Content Awards	2013	Presidential's Commendation	
