= My Teacher =

My Teacher may refer to:

- My Teacher (2017 film), a Japanese romantic drama film
- My Teacher (2022 film), a Philippine comedy-drama film
- Bloody Reunion, also known as My Teacher, a 2006 South Korean horror film
