= Jo Yoon-su =

South Korean actress (born 1998)

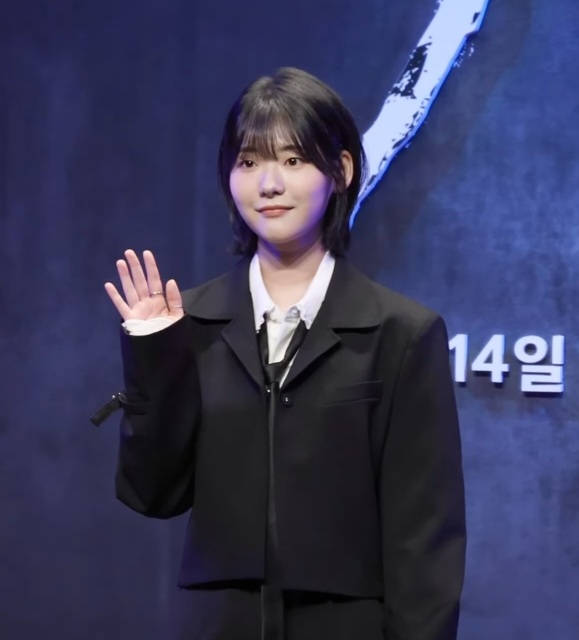
- Jo at The Tyrant press conference in July 2024
- Born: July 21, 1998 (age 28)
- Education: Yong In University (Bachelor in Music and Dance)
- Occupation: Actress
- Years active: 2019–present
- Agent: Alien Company

Korean name
- Hangul: 조윤수
- RR: Jo Yunsu
- MR: Cho Yunsu
- Website: aliencompany.co.kr

Jo Yoon-su (Korean: 조윤수; born July 21, 1998) is a South Korean actress. She is best known for her role in Park Hoon-jung's action-mystery Disney+ original series The Tyrant (2024). After her debut in a web drama by Cheese Films in 2019, she took on minor role in tvN drama True Beauty, followed by supporting roles in dramas such as the Netflix series Juvenile Justice, the tvN drama The Killer's Shopping List, and the JTBC drama The Interest of Love.

== Early life ==
Jo Yoon-soo has loved dancing since she was young, which led her to choose it as her career path. She majored in Korean traditional dance at Yong In University. However, upon entering college, she encountered many talented peers who had been dancing from a young age, leading her to doubt her ability to pursue it as a career. Initially, she considered a career as a flight attendant. However, after watching the drama The Guest, she was captivated by the characters' narratives and relationships, which inspired her to pursue acting.

== Career ==
=== Beginning ===
Jo Yoon-soo made her acting debut in the short film How Would It Feel to Kiss a Friend?, produced by Cheese Film, where she received praises for her portrayal of a student grappling with conflicted emotions. Her subsequent roles have showcased her versatile acting range. In the Netflix series Juvenile Justice, Jo underwent a significant transformation, playing Yoon Eun-jung, a juvenile criminal, and captivating viewers with her performance, which starkly contrasted with her earlier characters. Additionally, in the tvN drama tvN drama The Killer's Shopping List, she delivered a realistic and emotionally compelling performance as Kwon Bo-yeon, a daycare teacher struggling with depression.

Jo later portrayed Cha Sun-jae, a police officer candidate, in the JTBC drama The Interest of Love. Her role as a "love stealer," which creates tension between lead characters Jung Jong-hyun (played by Jung Ga-ram) and Ahn Soo-young (played by Moon Ga-young), left a lasting impression and demonstrated her ability to bring depth to supporting roles.

=== Agency change and breakthrough role ===
In August 2023, Jo's contract with Studio & New was terminated following the company's withdrawal from its management business. She subsequently signed an exclusive contract with Alien Company in December 2023.

In 2024, Jo reached a significant milestone in her career. She starred in Park Hoon-jung's The Tyrant, which premiered on Disney+ on August 14, 2024. Originally developed as a film, it was reformatted into a four-part series, as announced by Disney+ on February 19, 2024. Promotional activities featuring Jo alongside co-stars Cha Seung-won, Kim Seon-ho, and Kim Kang-woo were held in July and August ahead of the release. In the series, she plays the character Ja-gyeong, a killer for hire with multiple personalities, who sometimes transforms into her older brother's persona. Following her exposure on The Tyrant program, she evolves into a human weapon. Jo secured the lead role after three auditions. For the character, she cut her long hair short, which she had grown for her entire life. She also trained intensively at an action school.

For her performance in The Tyrant, Jo received several accolades. She won the Rising Star of the Year award at the 2024 Asia Contents Awards & Global OTT Awards where she was also nominated for the Best Newcomer Actress and People's Choice Award. She also won New Actress Award at the 2024 Asia Model Awards. Additionally, Jo was nominated as the New Actress Award at the 2024 APAN Star Awards. Her talent was further recognized with a nomination for the New Actress Award at the 61st Baeksang Arts Awards in 2025.

In February 2024, She acted in John Cariani's play Almost, Maine, in Bom Small Theater. Her casting in the Disney+ series The Manipulated was announced in September 2024.

== Filmography ==
=== Film ===
Jo's film acting credit
| Year | Title | Role | Notes | Ref. |
|---|---|---|---|---|
| TBA | Goblin: The Body Snatchers | Yu-na | Feature film debut | |

=== Television series ===
Jo's series acting credit
| Year | Title | Role | Notes | Ref. |
|---|---|---|---|---|
| 2020 | Love Revolution | Park Soo-jin | Kakao TV Web Drama | |
| 2021 | True Beauty | Lee Yeon-ji | tvN | |
| 2022 | The Killer's Shopping List | Kwon Bo-yeon | tvN | |
| 2022 | Juvenile Justice | Yoon Eun-jeong | Ep. 5 (Netflix Original Series) | |
| 2022–2023 | The Interest of Love | Cha Seon-jae | JTBC | |
| 2024 | The Tyrant | Chae Ja-kyung | Main Lead (Disney+ Original Series) | |
| 2025 | The Manipulated | No Eun-bi | Supporting role | |

=== Web drama ===
Jo's web drama acting credit
| Year | Title | Role | Notes | Ref. |
|---|---|---|---|---|
| 2019–2020 | How It Feel to Kiss Your Friend? | Yoon-su | CheeseFilm Shorts | |
| 2019–2020 | [Empathy] People who think they are ugly, people who wish that they are pretty | Yoon-su | CheeseFilm Shorts | |

== Theater ==
Jo's theater acting credit
| Year | Title | | Role | Venue | Date | Ref. |
| Year | English | Korean | Role | Venue | Date | Ref. |
|---|---|---|---|---|---|---|
| 2024 | Almost, Maine | 올모스트 메인 | Glory, Rhonda | Spring Theater (Bom Theater) | February 21 to 25 | |

== Awards and nominations ==
Awards and nominations received by Jo
| Award | Year | Category | Nominee(s) / work(s) | Result | Ref. |
|---|---|---|---|---|---|
| APAN Star Awards | 2024 | New Actress Award | The Tyrant | Nominated | |
| Asia Contents Awards & Global OTT Awards | 2024 | Rising Star of the Year | The Tyrant | Won | |
| Asia Contents Awards & Global OTT Awards | 2024 | Best Newcomer Actress | The Tyrant | Nominated | |
| Asia Contents Awards & Global OTT Awards | 2024 | People's Choice Award | The Tyrant | Nominated | |
| Asia Model Awards | 2024 | New Actress Award | The Tyrant | Won | |
| Baeksang Arts Awards | 2025 | New Actress Award | The Tyrant | Nominated | |
