= The Tyrant (TV series) =

2024 South Korean television series

- Promotional poster
- Hangul: 폭군
- Hanja: 暴君
- RR: Pokgun
- MR: P'okkun
- Genre: Action thriller; Spy
- Written by: Park Hoon-jung
- Directed by: Park Hoon-jung
- Starring: Cha Seung-won; Kim Seon-ho; Kim Kang-woo; Jo Yoon-su
- Music by: Mowg
- Country of origin: South Korea
- Original language: Korean
- No. of episodes: 4

Production
- Executive producer: Park Hoon-jung
- Producer: Shin Min-kyung
- Cinematography: Kim Young-ho; Yoo Young-ki
- Editor: Jang Rae-won
- Running time: 37–51 minutes
- Production companies: Goldmoon Pictures; Studio&NEW; Acemaker Movieworks

Original release
- Network: Disney+
- Release: August 14, 2024

The Tyrant (Korean: 폭군) is a 2024 South Korean action thriller spy television series directed by Park Hoon-jung, starring Cha Seung-won, Kim Seon-ho, Kim Kang-woo, and Jo Yoon-su. The series tells the story of the race to find a bioweapon that is stolen during a secret handover between South Korean and US intelligence agencies. It was released worldwide on Disney+ on August 14, 2024.

== Synopsis ==
The CIA uncovers the South Korean government's plan to develop a bioweapon that could enhance human abilities, a clandestine operation known as the "Tyrant Project", with the end goal of building an army of super soldiers to one day reunite the Korean Peninsula. The CIA demands the immediate termination of the program and the surrender of all samples. Following the dismantling of the project, the last sample of the bioweapon is supposed to be handed over to the CIA. However, an unknown assailant disrupts the covert handover.

Director Choe, a member of a government agency secretly overseeing the Tyrant Project, instructs his operative, Mo-yong, to secure the last sample, who then tasks his asset, Ja-gyeong, to do the deed. Upon hearing about the incident, CIA agent Paul resolves to personally retrieve the last sample. Lim Sang, a former agent tasked with eliminating individuals linked to the Tyrant Project, becomes involved in the pursuit.

== Cast and characters ==
=== Main ===
- Cha Seung-won as Lim Sang

A former agent turned hitman tasked with eliminating the forces related to The Tyrant Project.

- Kim Seon-ho as Director Choe

The young director of a South Korean national intelligence agency who has been running The Tyrant Project unofficially.

- Kim Kang-woo as Paul

A member of the US intelligence agency trying to dispose of the last sample of The Tyrant Project.

- Jo Yoon-su as Chae Ja-gyeong

An assassin who has been tasked with stealing the last sample of The Tyrant Project.

=== Supporting ===
- Mu Jin-sung as Yeon Mo-yong

A person who hires technician Ja-kyung to steal samples of the Tyrant Program.

- Kim Joo-hun as Director Sa

Director of the South Korean National Intelligence Agency, the same level as Director Choe. He is a character who clashes and forms an opposing stance with Director Choe.

- Lee Ki-young as First Vice Director

The first vice-director of the South Korean National Intelligence Agency.

- Park Hyung-soo as Chief Cho

An employee at National Intelligence Service.

- Choi Jung-woo as Professor Noh

A professor who participates in the operation of the Tyrant Program together with Director Choe.

- Cha Son-bae as Boss Seong

A gangster boss who runs a club that put a bounty on Ja-gyeong.

- Justin John Harvey as Crocodile 1

Paul's enhanced, super-human right hand.

- Kwon Hyuk as Crocodile 2

Paul's enhanced, super-human right hand.

- Lee Seung-kyung as Han-gom
- Kim Ho-jun as a taxi driver
- Im Su-hyung as a paramedic

=== Special appearances ===
- Jang Young-nam as Madame Kwan

A tailor store owner and a source who secretly provides information to Director Choe.

- Lee Sung-min as Ja-gyeong's adoptive father, who is famous assassin in the black market

== Episodes ==
The series consist of four episodes that was released simultaneously.

No.	Title	Directed by	Written by	Original release date	Length (minutes)
1	"Delivery Accident"; Transliteration: "Baesong sago" (Korean: 배송 사고)	Park Hoon-jung	Park Hoon-jung	August 14, 2024	42
A secret project being carried out in South Korea is discovered by an American intelligence agency. An agent Paul was dispatched to South Korea. Director Choe met Mrs. Kwan in an abandoned shopping mall. Moo-young met Chae Jae-gyeong to hire her to steal the sample. As soon as Ja-gyeong finishes the job, Moo-young shoots her and throws her into the river, and delivers the tyrant sample case that he stole to the NIS.
2	"The Sweepers"; Transliteration: "Cheongso budeul" (Korean: 청소 부들)	Park Hoon-jung	Park Hoon-jung	August 14, 2024	37
A retired veteran member of the organization, Lim Sang is asked to eliminate not only the Mo-yong who participated in the operation, but also Ja-gyeong. Director Choe has a conversation with his senior Director Sa at the National Intelligence Service, Director Sa during brunch. He then tells him not to order people around without any specific evidence and leaves.
3	"The Pursuers"; Transliteration: "Jjonneun jadeul" (Korean: 쫓는 자들)	Park Hoon-jung	Park Hoon-jung	August 14, 2024	44
Lim Sang interrogates Yeon Mo-yong's lackey in his train hideout, threatening to harm his family if he lies. He then shoots the man dead and proceeds to the apartment mentioned by the lackey. Meanwhile, Paul meets Director Choe in Hangang Park, where they engage in a tense confrontation. Paul then captured Choe and interrogated Choe about the sample, but Choe remains silent. They later intercept Director Sa's car and rescue Yeon Mo-yong, taking him to an abandoned building where Chief Cho, Director's Choe subordinate tries to deciphere the case. However, the sample is not found in the deciphered case.
4	"The Tyrant"; Transliteration: "Pokgun" (Korean: 폭군)	Park Hoon-jung	Park Hoon-jung	August 14, 2024	51
Chae Ja-kyung takes down the members of the crime syndicate and engages in a battle with Lim Sang. Despite their skills, they are evenly matched. Lim Sang proposes a truce to pursue their mutual target, Yeon Mo-yong. They locate Paul and his group, but their encounter is interrupted by Crocodile 2, leading to their car crash. Lim Sang saves Chae Ja-kyung by killing Crocodile 2 and discovers that she is infected with the tyrant program. Lim Sang strikes a deal with her to eliminate Yeon Mo-yong. Together, they confront Director Choe, Paul, and Yeon Mo-yong. Lim Sang kills Paul, while Chae Ja-kyung defeats Crocodile 1 with her enhanced abilities. Lim Sang attempts to kill her, but she fights back. Eventually, Chae Ja-kyung disappears with Director Choe's approval. Director Sa and his team arrive, but Lim Sang manages to kill some agents and escape, jumping into the river while still handcuffed. His fate remains unknown as he loses consciousness in the water. Meanwhile, Director Choe engages in a final confrontation with Director Sa. In the epilogue, a young Ja-gyeong, visits Mr. Chae, who had been alone on the radio 15 years ago. It is revealed that they are not biologically related. Ja-gyeong's eyes briefly turn black, indicating her innate witch abilities since childhood.

== Production ==
=== Development ===
According to Park Hoon-jung, who is the director and writer of The Tyrant, that the series is a story on a larger scale compared to the smaller narrative structures of The Childe (2023). It involves the emergence of multiple nations and highly skilled individuals. It shares a worldview to The Witch franchise, and depict story from the opposite side's perspective. The Tyrant will be a film that has elements of science fiction and fantasy.

Goldmoon Pictures together with Studio&NEW and Acemaker Movieworks collaborated on the production of the series. The production team includes individuals who have a long-standing working relationship with director Park. Martial arts director Kim Jung-min, who previously worked on 'The Witch' series, cinematographer Kim Young-ho, who collaborated on 'The Witch', 'Night in Paradise', and 'VIP', and music director Mowg joined forces.

Later, Park expressed his thoughts on the release of Disney+'s original series, saying, "I thought Disney+ was the best platform to present The Tyrant because it respects the original expression of the work and shows bold steps."

=== Casting ===
On October 19, 2022, S.A.L.T. Entertainment's representative disclosed to the press that Kim Seon-ho was confirmed to star in the film Tyrant. Simultaneously, an industry insider informed the press that Cha Seung-won would play the lead role in the film. YG Entertainment's representative confirmed that Cha had received an offer to appear and was positively considering it. In November 23 of the same year, Kim Kang-woo confirmed his appearance in Tyrant and reunited with director Park Hoon-jung and Kim Seon-ho, after their prior collaboration in The Childe.

Acemaker Movieworks made an announcement on January 9, 2023, confirming the casting of three actors for the film. Kim S. character, Director Choi, undergoes a 180-degree transformation from his previous role as Gwigongja in The Childe. The media has taken notice of Kim S.'s commitment to lose weight for his character in the new movie, which has increased excitement and anticipation for this upcoming role.

=== Filming ===
On December 28, 2022, it was reported that the principal photography of The Tyrant would begin in January 2023. Originally the plan was to start filming at the end of December, but it was delayed due to certain circumstances. On January 9, 2023, the film distributor, Acemaker Movieworks, officially announced the start date of filming as January 2, 2023.

Filming took place in Busan from January to February 2023. In February, filming was taking place at Doma-keun market in Daejeon. The remaining filming mostly occurred in Jeju for a duration of four months. The Jeju Indoor Film Studio was one of the locations used for filming thanks to an agreement between the film production company and the Jeju Film and Cultural Industry Promotion Agency. This collaboration allowed the film to benefit from the "Jeju Location Attraction Support Project," which provides incentives, location scouting, and administrative support to encourage local film and drama production companies to choose Jeju as their filming destination.

The series was also selected for the "2023 Chungnam Location Incentive Support Project" by the Chungnam Information and Culture Industry Promotion Agency. The support made it possible for The Tyrant's filming crews to film road action scenes in February 2023 with the active cooperation of Buyeo County Office and Gongju Hall Road Division.

== Release ==
At the end of the year 2023, it was reported that The Tyrant is part of the film distributor Ace Maker Movie Works' 2024 lineup. In early 2024, it was also mentioned as a film to be released that year. The Tyrant has secured pre-sales in various regions and platforms, including Germany (Splendid), Taiwan (MovieCloud), Southeast Asia (Purple Plan), Thailand (Neramitnung Film), CIS (Paradise Group), and in-flight entertainment (Eagle).

A statement from a representative of the series informed the press that The Tyrant was originally created with theater release in mind, but after filming was completed, it was completed as a four-part series during the editing process. The decision to expand it was made to effectively showcase the individual charm of each character and highlight the directorial expertise of Park Hoon-jung. It was announced as part of Disney+ 2024 lineup on February 19. This marked director Park Hoon-jung's first streaming series. Originally developed as a film, Disney+ announced on February 19, 2024, that it would be reformatted into a four-part series.

and is set to premiere worldwide on August 14, 2024. Disney+ dropped a trailer for the upcoming series on July 12. The press conference was held on July 15 at the Grand Intercontinental Parnas Hotel in Seoul, attended by Kim, Cha Seung-won, Kim Kang-woo, Jo Yoon-su, and director Park Hoon-jung.

The Tyrant was revealed to fans in advance through a 'Top Secret Premiere Screening' that was screened at Megabox COEX at 18:50 (KST) on August 9. After the screening, a GV with the main cast of the series including actors Cha Seung-won, Kim Seon-ho, Kim Kang-woo, and Jo Yoon-soo was held. On the same day at 19:00 (KST), the 'Tyrant Sample Chasing Competition' fan event held on the 5th floor of the Grand InterContinental Seoul Parnas.

== Reception ==
=== Critical reception ===
On the review aggregator website Rotten Tomatoes, 40% of 5 critics' reviews are positive, with an average rating of 5/10.

Carmen Chin of NME gave The Tyrant a four out of five rating and said that, "on the face of it, The Tyrant is a tried and true (if a bit tired) espionage thriller through and through. Yet, creator Park Hoon-jung elevates the material with a striking visual and narrative style, while also managing to surprise with twists that have novel substance and stakes. Everything is executed with impressive precision by someone who clearly loves what they do."

Pierce Conran of the South China Morning Post gave it two out of five stars, saying, "This exceptionally confusing, although very stylish show ... [is] similar to the lamentable sequel The Witch: Part 2. The Other One, another baffling parade of people bludgeoning each other with little rhyme or reason."

=== Streaming ranking ===
The Tyrant was the most-watched content on Disney+ Korea for twelve consecutive days, from its release on August 14 until August 25, as reported by Walt Disney Company Korea.

On FlixPatrol, a global OTT content ranking site, it ranked second in overall Disney+ content as of August 15. The series held the number one spot in FlixPatrol's overall ranking of Disney+ Korean content for 24 consecutive days. Internationally, it ranked first in the Disney+ comprehensive rankings on FlixPatrol in Hong Kong during its first week, and placed within the top five in Taiwan and Singapore. By its fourth week, the series ranked fifth in Hong Kong and third in Taiwan, where it remained in the top five of the box office for 24 consecutive days.

The Tyrant achieved top ten rankings across various big data platforms throughout August. Good Data Corporation's TV-OTT Drama Buzzworthiness placed it fifth in the third week of August and seventh in the fourth week. It achieved first place in overall rankings on Kinolights, a domestic OTT search and recommendation platform, on its release day; it then ranked third for the fourth week of August, and sixth the subsequent week. Watchapedia's "HOT 10" for the fourth week of August placed The Tyrant at the top spot.

== Accolades ==
=== Awards and nominations ===
Award	Year	Category	Recipient(s)	Result	Ref.
Asia Contents Awards & Global OTT Awards	2024	Best Director	Park Hoon-jung	Nominated	
Asia Contents Awards & Global OTT Awards	2024	Rising Star of the Year	Jo Yoon-su	Won	
Asia Contents Awards & Global OTT Awards	2024	Best Newcomer Actress	Jo Yoon-su	Nominated	
Asia Contents Awards & Global OTT Awards	2024	People's Choice Award	Jo Yoon-su	Nominated	
Asia Model Awards	2024	New Actress Award	Jo Yoon-su	Won	
29th Consumers' Day KCA Culture and Entertainment Awards	2024	Actor of the Year	Cha Seung-won	Won	
APAN Star Awards	2024	Best Actor in a Short/Web Drama	Kim Seon-ho	Nominated	
APAN Star Awards	2024	New Actress Award	Jo Yoon-su	Nominated	
61st Baeksang Arts Awards	2025	New Actress Award	Jo Yoon-su	Nominated	
Seoul International Drama Awards	2025	Asian Star Award	Kim Seon-ho	Won	

=== Listicles ===
Name of publisher, year listed, name of listicle, and placement
Publisher	Year	Listicle	Placement	Ref.
Elle Japan	2024	Top 5 Korean suspense dramas that you will definitely be hooked on [Latest 2024]	Top 5	

== See also ==
- The Witch: Part 1. The Subversion
- The Witch: Part 2. The Other One
