= The Interest of Love =

2022 South Korean television series

- Promotional poster
- Hangul: 사랑의 이해
- Hanja: 思量의 理解
- Lit.: Understanding of Love
- RR: Sarangui ihae
- MR: Sarangŭi ihae
- Genre: Melodrama; Romance; Workplace
- Based on: Understanding of Love by Lee Hyuk-jin
- Written by: Lee Seo-hyun; Lee Hyun-jeong
- Directed by: Jo Young-min
- Starring: Yoo Yeon-seok; Moon Ka-young; Keum Sae-rok; Jung Ga-ram
- Music by: Kim Jang-woo
- Country of origin: South Korea
- Original language: Korean
- No. of episodes: 16

Production
- Executive producer: Song Kyung-soo
- Producers: Park Sung-eun; Lee Ga-hyun
- Production company: SLL

Original release
- Network: JTBC
- Release: December 21, 2022 – February 9, 2023

The Interest of Love (Korean: 사랑의 이해) is a South Korean television series starring Yoo Yeon-seok, Moon Ka-young, Keum Sae-rok, and Jung Ga-ram, based on a novel of the same Korean title by writer Lee Hyuk-jin. It aired on JTBC from December 21, 2022 to February 9, 2023, every Wednesday and Thursday at 22:30 (KST). It is also available for streaming on Netflix in selected regions.

== Synopsis ==
The series follows the story of four young adults with different interests who meet each other at the Yeongpo branch of KCU Bank as they seek to understand the meaning of love.

== Cast ==
=== Main ===
- Yoo Yeon-seok as Ha Sang-soo: a manager at KCU Bank's Yeongpo branch who desires a normal lifestyle and believes that an unshakable life is the key to happiness.
  - Moon Seong-hyun as young Ha Sang-soo
- Moon Ga-young as Ahn Soo-young: a fourth-year head teller at KCU Bank's Yeongpo branch who views love as a sand castle that can collapse in an instant, but finds herself feeling excited because of a man who suddenly appears in her life.
- Keum Sae-rok as Park Mi-kyung: the self-assertive and straightforward assistant manager of the PB team of KCU Bank's Yeongpo branch who grew up in a wealthy family.
- Jung Ga-ram as Jeong Jong-hyun: a sincere and diligent man who dreams of becoming a police officer and works as a bank security guard.

=== Supporting ===
==== KCU Bank's Yeongpo branch ====
- Moon Tae-yu as So Kyung-pil: Sang-soo's friend who is the chief of the general affairs department.
- Jeong Jae-sung as Yook Si-kyung: branch manager.
- Lee Hwa-ryong as Noh Tae-pyeong: deputy manager.
- Park Hyung-soo as Lee Gu-il: a team leader.
- Lee Si-hoon as Ma Du-sik: an assistant manager.
- Yang Jo-ah as Seo Min-hee: a team leader.
- Jo In as Bae Eun-jung: a manager.
- Oh Dong-min as Yang Seok-hyun: Sang-soo's friend who is an insider and a deputy.
- Oh So-hyun as Kim Ji-yoon: the youngest bank clerk.

==== Others ====
- Seo Jeong-yeon as Han Jeong-im: Sang-soo's mother.
- Park Mi-hyun as Shim Kyung-sook: Soo-young's mother.
- Park Yoon-hee as Ahn In-jae: Soo-young's father.
- Yoon Yoo-sun as Yoon Mi-sun: Mi-kyung's mother.
- Park Sung-geun as Park Dae-sung: Mi-kyung's father.

=== Extended ===
- Jo Yoon-su as Cha Seon-jae: a high school student who dreams of becoming a police officer.

== Viewership ==
The Interest of Love : South Korea viewers per episode (thousands)

Season	Episode number															
Season	1	2	3	4	5	6	7	8	9	10	11	12	13	14	15	16
1	610	N/A	N/A	N/A	566	617	N/A	N/A	551	N/A	690	663	697	602	706	714

Source: Audience measurement performed nationwide by Nielsen Korea.

Average TV viewership ratings
Ep.	Original broadcast date	Average audience share (Nielsen Korea)	
Ep.	Original broadcast date	Nationwide	Seoul
1	December 21, 2022	3.124% (9th)	3.593% (3rd)
2	December 22, 2022	1.898% (18th)	N/A
3	December 28, 2022	2.151% (19th)	2.720% (6th)
4	December 29, 2022	2.457% (14th)	2.668% (10th)
5	January 4, 2023	2.777% (11th)	3.033% (4th)
6	January 5, 2023	2.972% (10th)	3.326% (7th)
7	January 11, 2023	2.427% (16th)	N/A
8	January 12, 2023	2.707% (15th)	3.386% (7th)
9	January 18, 2023	2.698% (13th)	2.926% (6th)
10	January 19, 2023	2.828% (15th)	3.553% (6th)
11	January 25, 2023	3.324% (9th)	3.920% (2nd)
12	January 26, 2023	3.348% (9th)	4.079% (5th)
13	February 1, 2023	3.536% (2nd)	3.926% (2nd)
14	February 2, 2023	3.214% (10th)	4.015% (5th)
15	February 8, 2023	3.601% (2nd)	4.099% (1st)
16	February 9, 2023	3.595% (5th)	4.414% (4th)
Average		2.916%	— (Note: Due to some unpublished ratings, the exact average rating is unknown.)
In the table above, the blue numbers represent the lowest published ratings and the red numbers represent the highest published ratings.; N/A denotes rating that was not released.; This series aired on a cable channel/pay TV which normally has a relatively smaller audience compared to free-to-air TV/public broadcasters (KBS, SBS, MBC, and EBS).
