= Abracadabra! The Galaxy of Ultimate Healing =

2025 Indonesian television show

- Genre: Reality; Travel
- Created by: Go Min Seok
- Written by: Park Hyun Sook; Park A Young; Shiin Ka Young; Kim Ga Eun; Jo Min Jeong; Kim Eun Bin; Park So Hee
- Directed by: Go Min Seok
- Starring: Ji Chang-wook; Pradikta Wicaksono; Bryan Domani; Pevita Pearce; Vanesha Prescilla; Maxime Bouttier; Agung Karmalogy
- Country of origin: Indonesian
- Original languages: Indonesian; Korean
- No. of seasons: 1
- No. of episodes: 5

Production
- Producers: Go Min Seok; Han Jeong Cheol
- Production locations: Bali; Yogyakarta; Sumba
- Production companies: Skytree Production; Studio Gaon

Original release
- Network: Viu
- Release: 28 November – 19 December 2025

Abracadabra! The Galaxy of Ultimate Healing is an Indonesian traveling reality show. The show was produced by Skytree Production and Studio Gaon in collaboration with Samsung. It aired from 28 November 2025 to 19 December 2025 on Viu, starring Ji Chang-wook, Pradikta Wicaksono, Bryan Domani, Pevita Pearce, Vanesha Prescilla, Maxime Bouttier, and Agung Karmalogy.

== Overview ==
Ji Chang-wook escapes his busy city routine after receiving a special invitation from the "Genies" and embarks on a journey across Bali, Yogyakarta, and Sumba. Each city introduces a new "Genie" who will guide him through moments of healing, connection, and restored happiness. Amidst the nature of Bali, the traditions of Yogyakarta, and the vast landscapes of Sumba, he discovers the beauty hidden in people and places, and gradually rediscovers the meaning of rest and renewal.

== Episode ==
No.	Directed by	Original release date
1	Go Min Seok	28 November 2025
Tired of a busy schedule, actor Ji Chang-wook receives a mysterious text message—an invitation from Indonesian "Genies." Overwhelmed with joy, he lands in Bali, where the mysterious "Genie Dikta" suddenly appears before him. From then on, Ji Chang-wook's healing journey begins to take an unexpected turn.
2	Go Min Seok	5 December 2025
Starting with a chaotic, laughter-filled dinner at a resort in Ubud with Agung Karmalogy, the "Intern Jin," Ji Chang-wook is soon captivated by the majesty of Mount Batur, his new "Jin," Bryan Domani, and the rushing waters of the Ayung River. Before he can recover from his overwhelming emotions, a healer appears with a mysterious "soul touch." Ji Chang-wook becomes increasingly curious about the strange and surprising sides of Indonesia that unfold before him.
3	Go Min Seok	12 December 2025
On his first day in Yogyakarta, Indonesia's ancient city, Ji Chang-wook meets the strong and beautiful "Genie," Pevita Pearce. Pevita acts as his guide and helps him experience the power of tradition and culture at the thousand-year-old Prambanan Temple. Soon after, he meets "Genie" Maxime Bouttier, a friendly and smiling foodie, to explore the city's culinary scene.
4	Go Min Seok	19 December 2025
Invited to a local chef's home in Yogyakarta, Ji Chang-wook meets a K-drama fan who blushes like a young girl as he greets him. Leaving behind a brief but lasting memory, Ji Chang-wook heads to the mysterious island of Sumba. Surrounded by stunning natural scenery, this time he is greeted by the melodious voice of a healer. The night in Sumba fades with a peaceful resonance. Invited to a local chef's home in Yogyakarta, Ji Chang-wook meets a K-drama fan who blushes like a young girl as he greets him. Leaving behind a brief but lasting memory, Ji Chang-wook heads to the mysterious island of Sumba. Surrounded by stunning natural scenery, this time he is greeted by the melodious voice of a healer. The night in Sumba fades with a peaceful resonance.
5	Go Min Seok	19 December 2025
This is it.. the final peak of the journey. Amidst the raw connection of Sumba's buffaloes, horses, and people, Ji Chang-wook discovers the ultimate cure for his soul. Guided by "Genie" Vanesha Prescilla, and the final surprise from "Intern-Genie" Agung Karmalogy, he reaches a breathtaking finale beneath the mesmerizing Galaxy in Sumba. In this final chapter, Chang-wook finds true healing in the quiet resonance of the night sky.
