= Mio Imada =

Japanese actress and model (born 1997)

- Born: March 5, 1997 (age 29); Chūō-ku, Fukuoka, Japan
- Occupations: Actress; model
- Years active: 2013—present
- Agent: Contents Three
- Modeling information
- Height: 157 cm (5 ft 2 in)
- Hair color: black
- Eye color: brown

Japanese name
- Kanji: 今田 美桜
- Hiragana: いまだ みお
Transcriptions
- Romanization: Imada Mio
- Website: imadamio.com

Mio Imada (今田 美桜, Imada Mio; born March 5, 1997) is a Japanese actress and model from Fukuoka. Imada began her acting and modelling career in 2015 after being labelled "Prettiest Girl in Fukuoka" by a local advertising agency. Her acting big break was in 2018 when she was cast as Airi Maya for notable Japanese drama series Boys Over Flowers Season 2.

== Biography ==
Imada was born on March 5, 1997, in Chūō-ku, Fukuoka City, Fukuoka Prefecture. She is the eldest of three sisters.

== Filmography ==
=== Film ===
Year	Title	Role	Notes	Ref.
2015	The Edge of Sin	Satomi Sugimoto		
2017	Comeback Night		Hong Kong film	
2017	Double Mints			
2017	Bus Jack Returns	Sanae Shiratori		
2017	Kalanchoe no Hana	Tsukino Ichinose	Lead role; short film	
2017	Demekin	Aki		
2019	You Shine in the Moonlit Night	Riko Hirabayashi		
2019	My Hero Academia: Heroes Rising	Slice (voice)		
2020	Stolen Identity 2	Ryōko Niwa		
2020	Wotakoi: Love Is Hard for Otaku	Yūki Morita		
2021	Tokyo Revengers	Hinata Tachibana		
2023	As Long as We Both Shall Live	Miyo Saimori		
2023	Tokyo Revengers 2: Bloody Halloween Part 1	Hinata Tachibana		
2023	Tokyo Revengers 2: Bloody Halloween Part 2	Hinata Tachibana		
2024	Doctor-X: The Movie	Masako Ohma		
2024	At the Bench		Lead role; anthology film	
2025	Trillion Game: The Movie	Kirika Kokuryu		
2025	The Last Man: The Movie – First Love	Yūki Agatsuma		
2026	Guilt	Mirei Shiraishi	Lead role	

=== Television drama ===
Year	Title	Role	Notes	Ref.
2015	Watashi wa Chichi ga Kirai Desu	CM talent		
2015	Kowabon	Kaori (voice)	Episode 8	
2017	Fugitive Boys	Mami Hoshino		
2017	Detective Yugami	Ikumi Mori	Episode 2	
2017	The Public Enemy	Riko		
2018	Kioku	Hana Adachi		
2018	Boys Over Flowers Season 2	Airi Maya		
2018	Honkowa: True Horror Stories: Summer 2018	Yuko Fujimoto	Short drama	
2018	Suits	Sari Tanimoto		
2019	Mr. Hiiragi's Homeroom	Yuzuki Suwa		
2019	Don't You Think Girls Who Talk in Hakata Dialect Are Cute?	Herself	Single-episode drama	
2019–21	Doctor-X: Surgeon Michiko Daimon	Masako Ohma	Seasons 6 and 7	
2020	Hanzawa Naoki: Episode 0	Hitomi Hamamura	Television film	
2020	Hanzawa Naoki	Hitomi Hamamura	Season 2	
2020	Daddy is My Classmate	Hiroko Yamamoto		
2021	Love Deeply	Aika Miyamae		
2021	Welcome Home, Monet	Riko Marianna Jinno	Asadora	
2022	Bad Girl: Glass Ceiling Crushers	Maririn Tanaka	Lead role	
2023	The Last Man: The Blind Profiler	Yūki Agatsuma		
2023	Trillion Game	Kirika Kokuryu		
2025	Anpan	Nobu Asada	Lead role; Asadora	
2026	Merry Berry Love	Karin Shirahama	Lead role; South Korean-Japanese drama	

=== Video games ===
- Professor Layton and The New World of Steam (2026), Luke Triton

=== Other television ===
- World Baseball Entertainment Tamacchi! (2018–19, Fuji TV)
- Imada Mio no Prefere (2018–19, TV Aichi)
- 76th NHK Kōhaku Uta Gassen (2025, NHK), as a host

=== Web series ===
- #Koe Dake Tenshi (January – March 2018, AbemaTV), Megumi

=== Commercials ===
- Marinoa City (2013–2015)
- Hiraki (2014–2016)
- Fukuoka Prefecture, Yanagawa Tourism idols "Sagemon Girls" (2016)
- Toogakuen High School (2017)
- Aoyama Trading Co., Ltd - Yofuku no Aoyama (2017)
- Shionogi Health Care - Sedes (2017)
- McDonald's (2017)
- Asahi Wonda (2017)
- Kyushu Electrical Safety Inspection Association (2017)
- Dai-ichi Life - Just (2018)
- SoftBank - Cyber Sunday (2018)
- Kosé - Beauty Calendar (2022)
- Super Mario Party Jamboree (2024)
- Tomodachi Life: Living the Dream (2026)
- Hankyu Hanshin Holdings - Toward Cities of Human Connections

=== Music videos ===
- Yoshitaka Taira – Hataraku Hitotachi (2015)
- The Love – Hajimari no Uta (February 28, 2016)
- Generations from Exile Tribe – Namida (June 4, 2016)
- Maco – Sweet Memory (November 9, 2017)
- Vaundy – Hashire Sakamoto (March 1, 2025)

=== Dubbing ===
Live-action

- Men in Black: International, Molly Wright / Agent M (Tessa Thompson)

Animation

- Lightyear, Izzy Hawthorne

== Awards and nominations ==
Year	Association	Award	Nominee/Work	Result	Ref.
2018	Yahoo! Search Awards	Actress Category	Herself	Won	
2018	#MVI – Most Valuable Instagrammer in Japan	Trend Category	Herself	Won	
2022	45th Japan Academy Film Prize	Newcomer of the Year	Tokyo Revengers	Won	
2024	48th Elan d'or Awards	Newcomer of the Year	Herself	Won	
