= 7 First Kisses =

2016 South Korean web series

- Also known as: Seven First Kisses; First Kiss for the Seventh Time
- Hangul: 첫키스만 일곱번째
- RR: Cheotkiseuman ilgopbeonjjae
- MR: Ch'ŏtk'isŭman ilgoppŏntchae
- Genre: Romantic comedy
- Directed by: Jung Jung-hwa
- Starring: Lee Cho-hee; Choi Ji-woo; Lee Joon-gi; Park Hae-jin; Ji Chang-wook; Kim Jong-in; Ok Taec-yeon; Lee Jong-suk; Lee Min-ho
- Country of origin: South Korea
- Original language: Korean
- No. of episodes: 8

Production
- Producers: Gab Lee; Song Byung-joon; Mario Jeong-soo Oh
- Production locations: Seoul, South Korea
- Running time: 9–12 mins
- Production companies: Lotte; Daehong Communications; Creative Leaders Group Eight; Thank You Very Much Contents Company

Original release
- Network: Naver TV Cast
- Release: December 5, 2016 – January 5, 2017

7 First Kisses (Korean: 첫키스만 일곱번째) is a South Korean promotional web series produced for Lotte Duty Free Shop. It aired online through Naver TV Cast and YouTube every Monday and Thursday at 10:00 (KST) from December 5, 2016, to January 5, 2017.

== Synopsis ==
Min Soo-jin (Lee Cho-hee) is a Lotte Duty Free store employee who has never been in a romantic relationship before. One day, she meets the goddess of dating (Choi Ji-woo), who grants her a chance to pick — among seven men — the perfect partner for her first kiss. Her options are a religious tech billionaire (Lee Joon-gi), a serious yet romantic boss (Park Hae-jin), a sexy secret agent (Ji Chang-wook), an adorable younger male friend (Kai), an innocent chaebol heir (Ok Taec-yeon), a beloved K-pop idol (Lee Jong-suk), and finally, a free-spirited travel writer (Lee Min-ho).

== Cast ==
=== Main ===
- Lee Cho-hee as Min Soo-jin
- Choi Ji-woo as Goddess (Ep. 1, 7)
- Lee Joon-gi as himself (Ep. 1–2)
- Park Hae-jin as himself (Ep. 2–3)
- Ji Chang-wook as himself (Ep. 3–4)
- Kim Jong-in as himself (Ep. 4–5)
- Ok Taec-yeon as himself (Ep. 5–6)
- Lee Jong-suk as himself (Ep. 6–7)
- Lee Min-ho as himself (Ep. 8)

=== Others ===
- Kim Hyun-jung as Sun-yeong (colleague #1)
- Lee Chung-mi as Ji-yeong (colleague #2)
- Seo Yeong-sam as a store manager
- Lee Hyo-joo as a girlfriend (Ep. 1)
- Noh Woo-jin as a pervert (Ep. 3)
- Lee Cha-yeon as a police officer #1
- Kim Yong-tae as a police officer #2

=== Special appearance ===
- Kim Ji-hoon as a man in the mall (Ep. 1)

== Original soundtrack ==
7 First Kisses Original Soundtrack

Soundtrack album by Various Artists
- Released: December 28, 2016
- Genre: Soundtrack
- Label: LOEN

=== Track listing ===
No.	Title	Lyrics	Music	Artist	Length
1.	"Kissing You"	Kim Dong-wook (HowL)	Ha Jeong-ho; Storyteller	Ji Chang-wook	3:29
2.	"Beautiful Day"	Kim Dong-wook (HowL); Park Geun-chul; Jeong Soo-min	Kim Dong-wook (HowL); Park Geun-chul; Jeong Soo-min	Melody Day	3:29
Total length:					6:58

== Production ==
The press conference was held at Lotte Cinema in Jamshil, Seoul, on November 22, 2016.

== List of episodes ==
Ep.	Broadcast date	Title	Actors	Making Film & Ending
1	December 5, 2016	"Her Present"	Lee Cho-hee, Choi Ji-woo, Lee Joon-gi	Making Film; Ending
2	December 8, 2016	"First Kiss?"	Lee Cho-hee, Lee Joon-gi, Park Hae-jin	Making Film; Ending
3	December 12, 2016	"Dangerous Boss"	Lee Cho-hee, Park Hae-jin, Ji Chang-wook	Making Film; Ending
4	December 15, 2016	"Till the End of the World"	Lee Cho-hee, Ji Chang-wook, Kai	Making Film; Ending
5	December 19, 2016	"I'm your teacher. You're my student"	Lee Cho-hee, Kai, Ok Taec-yeon	Making Film; Ending
6	December 22, 2016	"Too much to handle"	Lee Cho-hee, Ok Taec-yeon, Lee Jong-suk	Making Film; Ending
7	December 26, 2016	"How to fall in love with a celebrity"	Lee Cho-hee, Lee Jong-suk, Choi Ji-woo	Making Film; Ending
8	January 5, 2017	"Last gift"	Lee Cho-hee, Lee Min-ho	
