= Merry Berry Love =

2026 Japanese-South Korean television series

- Promotional poster
- Katakana: メリーベリーラブ
Transcriptions
- Revised Hepburn: Merī Berī Rabu
- Hangul: 메리 베리 러브
- RR: Meri beri reobeu
- MR: Meri peri rŏbŭ
- Genre: Romantic comedy
- Written by: Lee Tae-yoon
- Directed by: Kim Soo-jung; Noh Young-seop
- Starring: Ji Chang-wook; Mio Imada
- Opening theme: "Supermarket" by Sekai no Owari
- Countries of origin: Japan; South Korea
- Original languages: Japanese; Korean
- No. of episodes: 7

Production
- Executive producers: Lee Sang-hwa; Shinji Enari
- Producers: Park Chae-eun; Lee Soo-ji; Kim Geun-sil; Kenji Ikeda; Soji Inose; Shinichiro Kubo; Reon Iwami
- Production locations: Fukuoka Prefecture; Hongdae
- Production companies: CJ ENM; Nippon Television; Jayuro Pictures; Shochiku Film Studio

Original release
- Network: Nippon TV; Hulu (Disney+)
- Release: October 7, 2026 – present

Merry Berry Love (Japanese: メリーベリーラブ, Hepburn: Merī Berī Rabu; Korean: 메리 베리 러브) is an ongoing Japanese-South Korean romantic comedy television series written by Lee Tae-yoon, directed by Kim Soo-jung and Noh Young-seop. Produced under CJ ENM and Nippon Television, it stars Ji Chang-wook and Mio Imada. The series premiered on Nippon TV on October 7, 2026, airing every Wednesday at 22:00 (JST). It is also available for streaming on Hulu and Disney+.

== Cast ==
- Ji Chang-wook as Lee Yu-bin
- Mio Imada as Shirahama Karin
- Nam Yoon-su as Park Gu-nam
- Rinka Kumada as Mizuno Mari

== Production ==
=== Development ===
The series was officially commissioned by Disney+, with Kim Soo-jung, who helmed Semantic Error (2022) and Noh Young-seop, who helmed My Lovely Liar (2023) serving as directors, and the script is penned by Lee Tae-yoon, who wrote The Divorce Insurance (2025), while CJ ENM and Nippon Television managed the production.

During the scripting stage, the screenplay underwent multiple revisions over several months. The press conference was held on September 2, 2026, at the Nittele Tower in Shiodome, Tokyo.

=== Casting ===
Ji Chang-wook and Mio Imada were cast as the leads. Later on, Nam Yoon-su and Rinka Kumada were added to the cast.

=== Filming ===
Principal photography of the series commenced in September 2025 and concluded in March 2026. (Note: Visual Industry Promotion Organization reported that the series will consist of ten episodes and was filmed around Nokonoshima Island in Fukuoka Prefecture from September 2025 to January 2026. Infoloop reported that the series was also filmed around Hongdae in Seoul in March 2026.) Filming took place across multiple locations, including Japan and South Korea. During filming, Mio Imada fell several times while performing running scenes, including a chase sequence.

== Release ==
In November 2025, Disney+ revealed its slate lineup for 2026. The series' first teaser was unveiled on September 2, 2026, and confirmed for an October release.

The series is scheduled to premiere on Nippon TV on October 7, 2026, airing every Wednesday at 22:00 (JST). It will also be made available to stream exclusively on Hulu (Disney+) in selected regions and territories.
