= The Scandal (2026 TV series) =

2026 South Korean television series

- Promotional poster
- Hangul: 스캔들
- RR: Seukaendeul
- MR: Sŭk'aendŭl
- Genre: Period drama; Romance
- Inspired by: Les Liaisons dangereuses by Pierre Choderlos de Laclos; Untold Scandal by E J-yong
- Written by: Lee Seung-young; Ahn Hye-song
- Directed by: Jung Ji-woo
- Starring: Son Ye-jin; Ji Chang-wook; Nana
- Music by: Lee Ji-yeon
- Country of origin: South Korea
- Original language: Korean
- No. of episodes: 8

Production
- Executive producers: Kim Jae-joong; Jung Ji-woo
- Producers: Yang Soo-jung; Lee Sang-hyun
- Cinematography: Lee Tae-yoon
- Editor: Kim Hyung-joo
- Production companies: Movierock; Cine Forest

Original release
- Network: Netflix
- Release: September 18, 2026

The Scandal (Korean: 스캔들) is a 2026 South Korean period romance drama television series written by Lee Seung-young and Ahn Hye-song, directed by Jung Ji-woo, and starring Son Ye-jin, Ji Chang-wook, and Nana. The series is inspired by the French novel Les Liaisons dangereuses by Pierre Choderlos de Laclos and the 2003 film Untold Scandal by E J-yong, moving the story in Korea during Joseon dynasty era, and it follows individuals who defy society's rigid order and enter a dangerous game of love and temptation. It was released on Netflix on September 18, 2026.

== Synopsis ==
Lady Cho, a noblewoman living within the constraints of Confucian social order, and Cho Won, a wealthy aristocrat known for his libertine lifestyle. The two form an agreement to manipulate romantic relationships for their own purposes, testing the boundaries of social convention. Their arrangement is disrupted when Ahn Hui-yeon, a young widow unfamiliar with courtship, becomes involved, leading to unintended emotional entanglements and conflicts among the three.

== Cast and characters ==
=== Main ===
- Son Ye-jin as Lady Cho / Cho Yun
  - Shin So-hyun as young Cho Yun
- Ji Chang-wook as Cho Won
  - Jeong Hyun-jun as young Cho Won
- Nana as Ahn Hui-yeon

=== Supporting ===
- Han Sun-hwa as Bun-hui, So-ok's mother and a tobacco merchant
- Kang Ji-eun as Lady Jeong-kyeong, Left State Councilor's wife and In-ho's mother
- Kang Chan-hee as In-ho, Jeong-kyeong and Left State Councilor's younger son
- Shin Youn-ha as So-ok, Bun-hui's daughter and Lord Yoo's concubine
- Lee Ji-hoon as Lord Yoo, Lady Cho's husband
- Kwon Do-gyun as Chil-seong, Cho Won's servant
- Kim Ji-an as Eun-sil, Hui-yeon's servant
- Jung Ki-seob as the Left State Councilor
- Chae Seo-rin as Mi-ok, Bun-hui's step-daughter

=== Others ===
- Seo Ji-woo as Gye-hwa
- Nam Gi-ae as Lady So
- Lee Saeromi as Lady Nyeo
- An A-young as Lady Shi
- Gong Jae-kyung as Lady Dae
- Kim Seung-wook as Yun's father
- Bae Ki-bum as Clan Elder Bae
- Jo Yeon-ho as Clan Elder Cho
- Hong Sung-duk as Clan Elder Hong
- Kwak Min-suk as Won's father
- Lee Hwa-yeong as the lady from Ganghwa
- Park Hee-eun as Yun's mother

== Production ==
=== Development ===
The series was officially commissioned by Netflix, under the working title Scandals, with Jung Ji-woo serving as director. It is inspired by the French novel Les Liaisons dangereuses by Pierre Choderlos de Laclos, in a Joseon dynasty era. The script is written by Lee Seung-young and Ahn Hye-song with Movierocks and Cine Forest managed the production.

=== Casting ===
In October 2024, Ji Chang-wook and Son Ye-jin were reportedly cast and positively reviewing it. In February 2025, Han Sun-hwa was cast in an original mystery role not present in previous adaptations, while it was reported that Nana also considering to appear. Concurrently, it was confirmed that Kang Chan-hee had joined the cast as In-ho. By March 2025, Netflix confirmed Son, Ji, and Nana as the principal cast of the series, reprising the corresponding main roles from the 2003 film Untold Scandal.

On September 8, 2026, rookie actress Shin Youn-ha was revealed to have been cast as So-ok, a concubine who later develops feelings for Kang Chan-hee's character, In-ho. On September 9, 2026, director Jung Ji-woo unveiled Han Sun-hwa's original role, describing her character as a shameless woman obsessed with money and prestige. Although a minor, unnamed version of So-ok's mother appeared in the 2003 film Untold Scandal, the Netflix adaptation gave the character the name Bun-hui and substantially expanded the role into a major character, played by Han Sun-hwa, with Netflix labeling it as an original character for the adaptation.

=== Filming ===
Principal photography began in March 2025, and ended in September of the same year.

== Release ==
Netflix confirmed The Scandal was scheduled to be released in the third quarter of 2026. By August 2025, the series was confirmed to premiere on September 18.

== Reception ==
The Scandal received mixed reviews from critics, with commentary focusing on its performances, pacing, visual presentation, and adaptation of Pierre Choderlos de Laclos's novel Les Liaisons dangereuses, as well as comparisons with the 2003 South Korean film Untold Scandal.

=== Viewership ===
Following its release, The Scandal ranked first among television shows in South Korea on Netflix's Top 10 chart for the week of September 14–20, 2026. During the same week, it ranked seventh globally among Netflix's non-English television shows, recording 1.9 million views and 14.5 million hours viewed. In its second week, it ranked third globally among non-English television shows, with 2.8 million views and 21.9 million hours viewed.

=== Critical response ===
Critical responses ranged from favorable to strongly negative. South China Morning Post awarded the series four out of five stars and praised its visual presentation and the performances of Son Ye-jin and Nana, while India Today praised the nuanced performances of Son and Ji Chang-wook. In contrast, several Korean reviews were sharply critical of the series. Maeil Business Newspaper criticized the series' relatively explicit scenes, arguing that they were not sufficiently integrated into the story's progression and the characters' emotional arcs. JoyNews24 similarly criticized the series' slow progression, characterization, and casting. The divided response was acknowledged by Ji, who said that the harsh reviews were disappointing but that he had anticipated that the series would not receive universal praise. Son likewise acknowledged the mixed reactions, noting that the series' slower pace and restrained storytelling might not appeal to all viewers. Director Jung Ji-woo also acknowledged the polarized response to the series.

=== Performances ===
Son Ye-jin's portrayal of Lady Cho received favorable assessments from critics amid public criticism of her historical tone and dialogue delivery. India Today praised the series' nuanced performances and described Son's Lady Cho as compelling, highlighting the character's calculating nature and loneliness.

Ji Chang-wook's portrayal of Cho Won received contrasting assessments. India Today praised his emotional range and nuanced performance, whereas Sports Kyunghyang criticized his interpretation as overly forceful and slick.

Nana's performance as Ahn Hui-yeon also received mixed responses. South China Morning Post praised her performance as one of the series' anchors, while Sports Kyunghyang criticized her portrayal of Hui-yeon as one-dimensional, particularly noting the limited variation in her expressions and emotional throughline. Her appearance also became the subject of criticism after the premiere, particularly her prominent lips, which some viewers felt distracted from the Joseon-era setting. Nana subsequently acknowledged the criticism and apologized, saying that if her lips had made viewers uncomfortable, it was her fault and that her personal appearance choice had not been appropriate for her role as an actor.

Han Sun-hwa's performance as Bun-hui received favorable attention and notably positive reviews from both critics and public, despite the character's limited screen time. OSEN and Ten Asia praised her portrayal of Bun-hui's maternal affection, personal desires, and calculating nature, highlighting her control of voice tone, dialogue delivery, and facial expressions. It described her as bringing an irreplaceable presence and vitality to the series. Sports Kyunghyang similarly highlighted her distinctive presence and expressive range. She was also described as a scene-stealer in coverage of the series by Sports Seoul. Newsen, in its assessment of the series' reception, highlighted Han as the performer who remained particularly memorable despite the criticism directed at the lead cast and controversy surrounding the drama.

=== Other performances ===
Among the younger supporting cast, JoyNews24 praised Shin Youn-ha's performance as So-ok, highlighting her energetic performance and striking presence, and describing her as a promising new talent. The review also noted Kang Chan-hee's portrayal of In-ho, highlighting the character's clumsy yet endearing charm in his relationship with So-ok. OSEN praised Kim Ji-an's portrayal of Eun-sil in her first historical drama, noting her stable acting and noticeable presence. Newsen highlighted Kwon Do-gyun's strong presence as Chil-seong, while Sports Kyunghyang noted the interest generated by his romance with Eun-sil.
