= The Manipulated =

2025 South Korean television series

- Promotional poster
- Hangul: 조각도시
- Hanja: 彫刻都市
- Lit.: Sculpture City
- RR: Jogakdosi
- MR: Chogaktosi
- Genre: Crime; Thriller; Revenge; Action
- Based on: Fabricated City by Park Kwang-hyun
- Developed by: CJ ENM
- Written by: Oh Sang-ho
- Directed by: Park Shin-woo; Kim Chang-ju
- Starring: Ji Chang-wook; Doh Kyung-soo; Kim Jong-soo; Jo Yoon-su; Lee Kwang-soo
- Music by: Kim Tae-seong
- Country of origin: South Korea
- Original language: Korean
- No. of episodes: 12

Production
- Running time: 50 minutes
- Production companies: CJ ENM; Studio Dragon; Simplex Films
- Budget: ₩35 billion

Original release
- Network: Hulu (Disney+)
- Release: November 5 – December 3, 2025

The Manipulated (Korean: 조각도시) is a 2025 South Korean revenge action crime thriller television series written by Oh Sang-ho, directed by Park Shin-woo and Kim Chang-ju, and starring Ji Chang-wook, Doh Kyung-soo, Kim Jong-soo, Jo Yoon-su, and Lee Kwang-soo. It is based on the film Fabricated City, which Oh Sang-ho co-wrote.

It depicts the story of an ordinary man whose life is abruptly shattered for being wrongly accused of a major crime, but returns to pursue a bloody vengeance after discovering it was a fabrication. The series premiered with 4 episodes on Disney+ as a Hulu original series on November 5, 2025, as the Star content hub was replaced by Hulu on October 8, 2025.

== Synopsis ==
It follows an ordinary man, Park Tae-jung, whose life takes a drastic turn when he is wrongfully accused of a heinous crime and sent to prison. After discovering that everything was orchestrated by An Yo-han, he sets out on a path of revenge.

== Cast and characters ==
=== Main ===
- Ji Chang-wook as Park Tae-jung

A man who lived an ordinary life but was falsely accused of committing a heinous crime, and was sentenced to life.

- Doh Kyung-soo as An Yo-han

The CEO of an exclusive security service who is linked to the incident that led to Tae-jung's imprisonment.

- Kim Jong-soo as No Yong-sik

Tae-jung's benefactor in prison.

- Jo Yoon-su as No Eun-bi

Yong-sik's daughter.

- Lee Kwang-soo as Baek Do-kyoung

Yo-han's VIP client.

=== Supporting ===
==== Guan Prison ====
- Yang Dong-geun as Yeo Deok-su

The most influential person in Guan Prison.

- Kim Jae-chul as Yang Chul-hwan

A prison officer of Guan Prison.

- Eum Moon-suk as Do Gang-jae

A fellow inmate in Guan Prison, and the fierce rival of Deok-su.

- Lee Jae-kyoon as Koo Ji-yong

Tae-jung's cellmate in Guan Prison.

- Lee Seo-hwan as Park Han-hee

The warden of Guan Prison.

==== Others ====
- Kim Joong-hee as Kim Sang-rak

A public defender of Kim Sang-rak Law Office.

- Ahn Ji-ho as Park Tae-jin

Tae-jung's younger brother.

- Kwon Da-ham as Woo-jong

Tae-jung's friend.

- Kim Jung-heon as Jung-soo

Tae-jung's friend.

- Lee Suk-hyeong as Dae-hoon

Tae-jung's friend.

- Han Ji-hyo as Lee Sun-ah

Eun-bi's roommate.

- Son Jong-hak as Baek Sang-man

Do-kyoung's father and a sitting member of the National Assembly.

- Lim Hwa-young as So Hyun-jung

The boss of a hair salon, and the next manipulated target of Yo-han.

- Lee Sung-woo as Hwang Il-guk

A corrupt detective of the Seoul Junggu Police Station.

- Lee Hyun-jin as Ching Li

A Chinese killer working for Yo-han.

- Kim Min as Yoo Seon-gyu

Do-kyoung's partner.

- Do Hyun-jin as Han-byeol

Eun-bi's friend in Busan.

=== Special appearances ===
- Pyo Ye-jin as Song Su-ji

Tae-jung's girlfriend.

- Lee Jong-hyun as a sports car driver
- Lee Jae-won as a prosecutor
- Bae Na-ra as Woo Min-hyung

A killer working for Yo-han.

- Jeong In-gi as Yo-han's nanny
- Park Mi-hyun as Do-kyoung's mother

== Production ==
=== Development ===
The series was developed by the film division of CJENM, which also produced it with Studio Dragon and Simplex Films with a production budget of 35 billion won. It was written by Oh Sang-ho , who also wrote the series Taxi Driver. In November 2024, Disney+ announced official English name for the series.

=== Casting ===
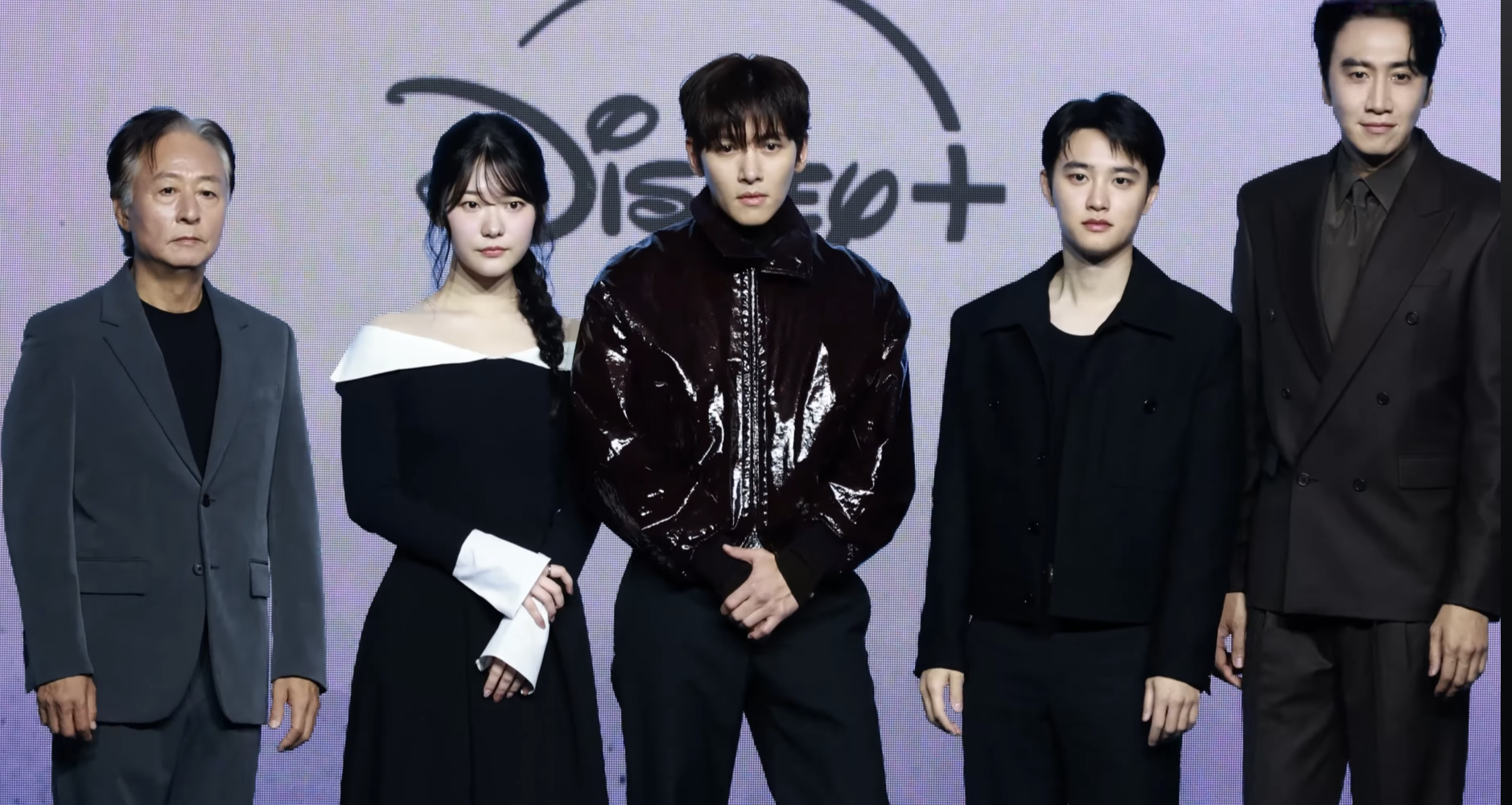
The Manipulated cast at the press conference on November 3, 2025

On November 13, 2023, Ji Chang-wook and Doh Kyung-soo were confirmed to be cast in the roles of the main characters.

Jo Yoon-su announced her casting in series in September 2024. In October 2024, news outlets revealed that Pyo Ye-jin was cast as Ji Chang-wook's love interest. In November same year, Lee Kwang-soo's agency King Kong by Starship confirmed his appearance in series as Baek Do-kyung.

== Release ==
The Manipulated was released with 4 episodes on November 5, 2025, on Disney+ under the Hulu on Disney+ label. Subsequently, 2 episodes per week would be released on every Wednesday, with the final 2 episodes on December 3.

== Reception ==
The Manipulated achieved strong viewership, ranking first in South Korea for two consecutive weeks and placed within the worldwide Top 4 as of 17 November, according to FlixPatrol. It also topped KinoLights’ OTT Trend Rankings for the second week of November. The related film Fabricated City similarly experienced a resurgence, rising to No. 2 on several OTT platforms. It also recorded 1.14 million participants on Naver Open Talk, the highest engagement among entertainment programs.
