= Ji Chang-wook =

South Korean actor and singer (born 1987)

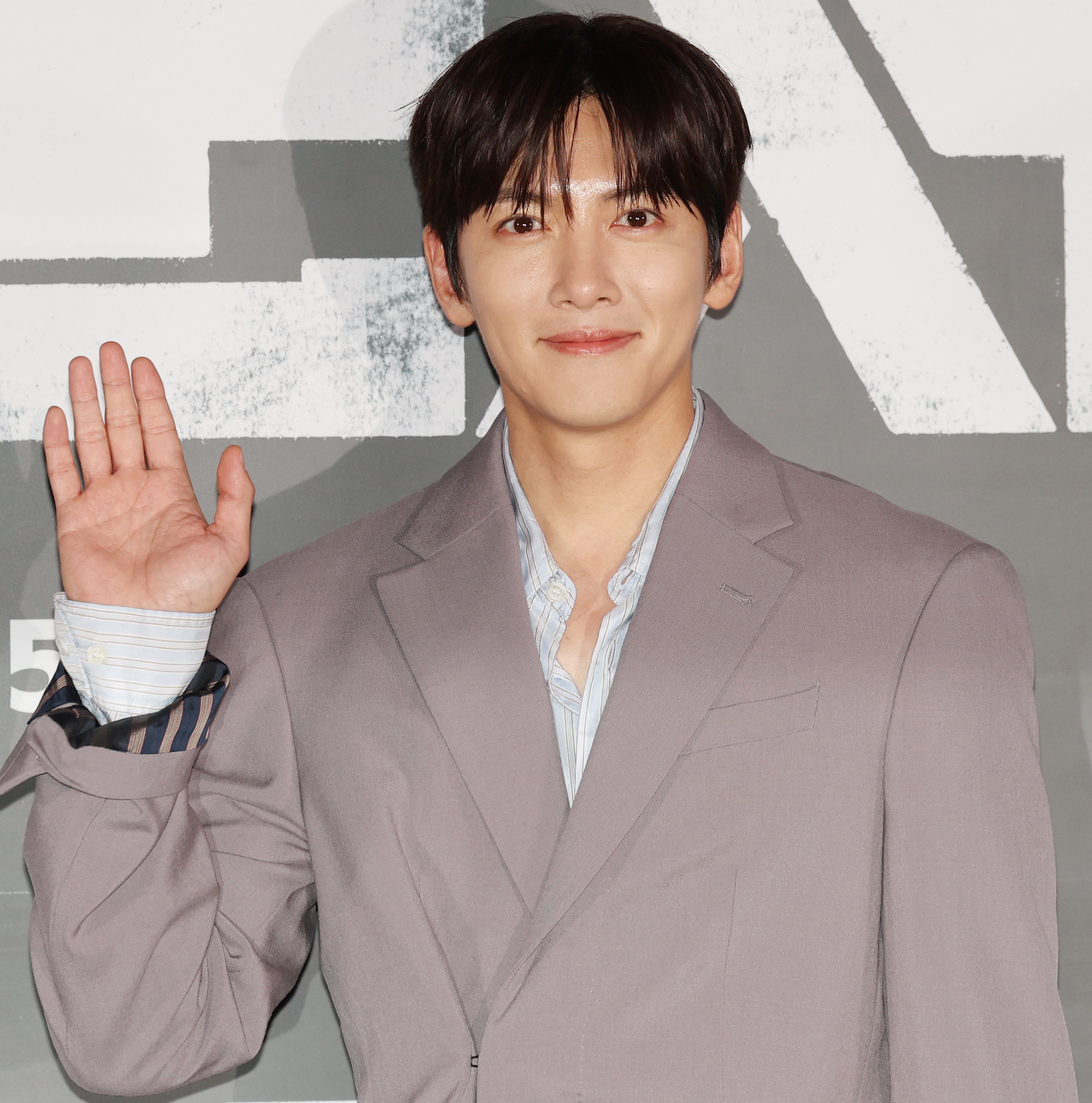
- Ji in 2026
- Born: 5 July 1987 (age 39); Anyang, Gyeonggi Province, South Korea
- Education: Dankook University (Department of Performing Arts)
- Occupations: Actor; singer
- Years active: 2006–present
- Agent: Spring Company

Korean name
- Hangul: 지창욱
- RR: Ji Changuk
- MR: Chi Ch'anguk
- Website: springcompany.co.kr

Signature
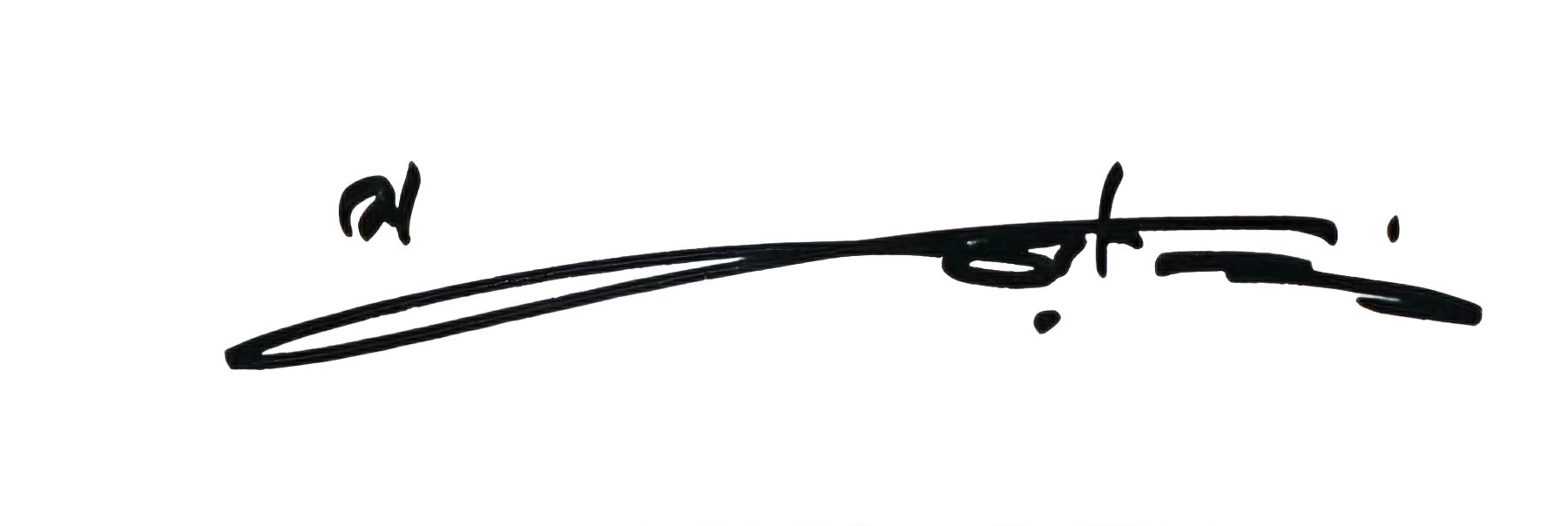

Ji Chang-wook (Korean: 지창욱; born 5 July 1987) is a South Korean actor and singer. He rose to fame for playing the lead role of daily drama series Smile Again (2010–2011), and gained further prominence with television series Warrior Baek Dong-soo (2011), Empress Ki (2013–2014), Healer (2014–2015), The K2 (2016), Suspicious Partner (2017), The Worst of Evil (2023), Welcome to Samdal-ri (2023–2024), and film Fabricated City (2017).

== Career ==
=== 2006–2009: Beginnings ===
Ji began his career in musical theatre before appearing in the 2006 short film Days..., the 2008 television series You Stole My Heart, and the film Sleeping Beauty.

In 2009, he appeared in My Too Perfect Sons, playing the timid youngest brother who ends up raising his best friend's daughter at just 20 years old. The weekend family drama received over 40% ratings. He then took on a supporting role in the action-comedy Hero.

=== 2010–2012: Rising popularity ===
In 2010, Ji was cast in his first lead role in the 159-episode daily drama Smile Again, playing the role of a Korean-American short track speed skater. Smile Again topped the ratings chart for 15 consecutive weeks, and he was awarded Best Actor in a Daily Drama at the 2010 KBS Drama Awards.

He then played the titular character in the 2011 historical-action series Warrior Baek Dong-soo. Adapted from Lee Jae-heon's manhwa Honorable Baek Dong-soo, it is an origin story about Joseon-era swordsman Baek Dong-soo, showing his early years until political intrigue creates a rivalry with his childhood best friend-turned-enemy. The series topped its timeslot for 13 weeks, and Ji received a New Star Award at the 2011 SBS Drama Awards. Later that year, he played the lead role in the cable drama Bachelor's Vegetable Store, which is based on the true story of Lee Young-seok, a young man who turned a tiny 350-square-foot vegetable store in 1998 into a nationwide franchise with 33 stores.

In his first antagonist role in the melodrama Five Fingers (2012), Ji played a pianist who envies his older brother's natural gift for music. Ji returned to musical theatre in 2013 with The Days, playing a presidential bodyguard who went missing 20 years earlier along with a mysterious female companion. The Days was a jukebox musical using the folk rock songs of Kim Kwang-seok.

=== 2013–2022: Breakthrough and overseas ventures ===
Ji's breakthrough came through his role as Toghon Temür (also known as Ta Hwan), the 16th emperor of the Yuan Dynasty, in the historical drama Empress Ki. The drama drew strong nationwide viewership ratings throughout its run, averaging 35.12%. Ji's portrayal received critical acclaim and recognition.

Ji then starred as the titular character in the action-thriller television series Healer (2014–2015). Following the drama's broadcast, Ji gained popularity in China and other parts of Asia. He subsequently appeared in Mandarin-language dramas, includingThe Whirlwind Girl 2.

In 2016, Ji starred in tvN's action-thriller The K2, portraying a bodyguard who is betrayed by his fellow countrymen and falls in love with a woman with post-traumatic stress disorder and apparent sociophobia. The drama received favourable reviews and topped cable television viewership ratings during its eight-week broadcast. In November 2016, he co-starred in the promotional web series 7 First Kisses for Lotte Duty Free.

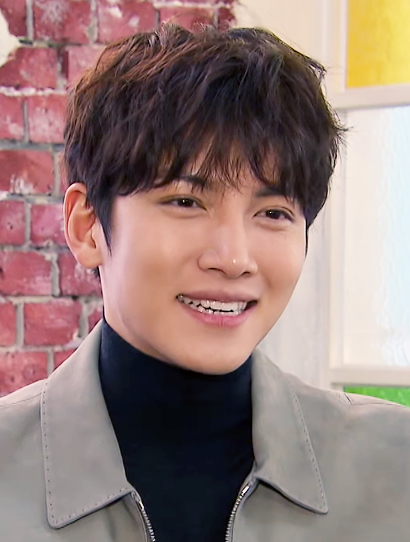
Ji in February 2017

In 2017, Ji starred in the action film Fabricated City, playing a jobless gaming enthusiast who is framed for murder. The same year, he starred as a prosecutor in SBS's romantic comedy thriller series Suspicious Partner, which premiered in May.

Following his discharge from military service in 2019, Ji starred in the romantic comedy series Melting Me Softly, portraying a television producer who awakens 20 years after an unsuccessful cryogenic preservation experiment.

In 2020, Ji starred in the romantic comedy series Backstreet Rookie, based on a webtoon of the same name. He played a former public relations director of a convenience store franchise who ends up managing his own convenience store. He also starred in the romantic comedy web series Lovestruck in the City.

In 2021, he appeared in Kim Chang-ju's thriller film Hard Hit, playing a mysterious caller who blackmails the protagonist and his family with a bomb planted in their car. In 2022, Ji starred in the Netflix series The Sound of Magic, based on a webtoon of the same name, portraying the mysterious magician Ri Eul. That year, he also starred in the KBS2 television series If You Wish Upon Me as an ex-convict who volunteers at a hospice.

=== 2023–present: New agency and subsequent projects ===
In March 2023, Ji ended his contract with Glorious Entertainment. That month, he was reported to be preparing to establish a one-person agency with his longtime manager. In April 2023, he signed with Spring Company.

Ji also reprised his role as Mu-yeong in the tenth-anniversary season of the musical The Days in 2023. He also starred in the television series The Worst of Evil and Welcome to Samdal-ri that year. On 15 November 2023, he debuted as a solo recording artist in Japan.

In 2024, Ji appeared in the historical drama Queen Woo and the series Gangnam B-Side. He also appeared in the film Revolver (2024 film).

In 2025, Ji starred in the television series The Manipulated, and released his first Japanese studio album, Assemble.

In 2026, Ji appeared in the film Colony, the television series The Scandal, and Merry Berry Love. In October, he held a concert tour in Japan titled Just Come With. He was also announced as an emcee for the 2026 Asia Artist Awards in Kaohsiung, Taiwan.

Ji was additionally cast in the upcoming productions Human X Gumiho, Men of the Harem, and the Netflix film The Generals.

== Personal life ==
=== Military service ===
Ji began his mandatory military service on 14 August 2017. He underwent basic military training at the Army's 3rd Infantry Division in Cheorwon, Gangwon Province. Upon completion, he received an award for his exemplary performance.

Ji was assigned to the Army's 5th Artillery Brigade in Cheorwon to complete the remainder of his military service. He was appointed a platoon leader and promoted to Corporal. He was later promoted to Sergeant. Ji was discharged on 27 April 2019.

=== Philanthropy ===
In February 2023, Ji donated ₩100 million through UNICEF to support relief efforts following the Turkey–Syria earthquake.

== Filmography ==
Key
†	Denotes films that have not yet been released

=== Film ===
Year	Title	Role	Notes	Ref.
2006	Days...	Soo-bin		
2006	In Search of Lost Time	Min-seong	Short film	
2008	Sleeping Beauty	Jin-seo		
2009	The Weird Missing Case of Mr. J	Sun Gun-man	Bit part	
2010	Death Bell 2: Bloody Camp	Soo-il		
2010	Confession	Grandson	Short film	
2013	How to Use Guys with Secret Tips	Hong-jun's brother	Cameo	
2015	The Long Way Home	Military police	Cameo	
2016	Your Name	Taki Tachibana	Voice; Korean dub	
2017	Fabricated City	Kwon Yoo		
2017	The Bros	Young Choon-bae	Cameo	
2021	Hard Hit	Jinwoo		
2024	Revolver	Andy / Mad Dog		
2026	Colony	Choi Hyun-seok		
TBA	The Generals †	Heo Hak-sung	Netflix film	

=== Television series ===
Year	Title	Role	Notes	Ref.
2008	You Stole My Heart	Lee Phillip		
2009	My Too Perfect Sons	Song Mi-poong		
2009–2010	Hero	Park Jun-hyeong		
2010–2011	Smile Again	Carl Laker / Dong-hae		
2011	Warrior Baek Dong-soo	Baek Dong-soo		
2011–2012	Bachelor's Vegetable Store	Han Tae-yang		
2012	Five Fingers	Yoo In-ha		
2013–2014	Empress Ki	Toghon Temür / Ta Hwan		
2014–2015	Healer	Seo Jung-hoo / Park Bong-soo / Healer		
2016	The Whirlwind Girl 2	Chang An	Chinese drama	
2016	The K2	Kim Je-ha / K2		
2017	Suspicious Partner	Noh Ji-wook		
2019	Melting Me Softly	Ma Dong-chan		
2020	Backstreet Rookie	Choi Dae-hyun		
2020–2021	Lovestruck in the City	Park Jae-won		
2022	The Sound of Magic	Lee Eul		
2022	If You Wish Upon Me	Yoon Gyeo-rye		
2023	The Worst of Evil	Park Joon-mo		
2023–2024	Welcome to Samdal-ri	Cho Yong-pil		
2024	Queen Woo	Go Nam-mu / Gogukcheon of Goguryeo		
2024	Gangnam B-Side	Yoon Gil-ho		
2025	The Manipulated	Park Tae-jung		
2026	The Scandal	Cho Won		
2026	Merry Berry Love	Lee Yubin	Korea-Japan collaboration	
2027	Human X Gumiho †	Choi Seok		
2027	Men of the Harem †		Special appearance	

=== Web series ===
Year	Title	Role	Notes	Ref.
2014	Kara: Secret Love	Angel No. 2013, Chun Sa Nam	Ep. 9–10	
2016	7 First Kisses	Himself	Ep. 3–4	

=== Television show ===
Year	Title	Role	Ref.
2022	Young Actors' Retreat	Cast member	
2024	My Name is Gabriel	Cast member	
2025	Abracadabra! The Galaxy of Ultimate Healing	Himself	
2026	Kumusta	Himself	

=== Music video appearances ===
Year	Title	Artist	Ref.
2007	"Are You Ready"	Lena Park feat. Dynamic Duo	
2009	"We Broke Up Today"	Younha	
2010	"I Have to Let You Go"	Young Gun	
2011	"Cry Cry"	T-ara	
2012	"Lovey-Dovey"	T-ara	
2012	"I Need You"	K.Will	
2013	"That's My Fault"	Speed	
2013	"It's Over"	Speed	
2013	"Runaway"	Kara	
2024	"No More Drinks"	Lee Juck	
2025	"Even if"	Heize	

== Theater ==
Musical play performances
Year	Title		Role	Ref.
Year	English	Korean	Role	Ref.
2007	Fire and Ice	불과 얼음		
2010	Thrill Me	쓰릴미	Richard Loeb	
2013–2017; 2023	The Days	그날들	Mu-young	
2013	Jack the Ripper	살인마 잭	Daniel	
2013	Brothers Were Brave	형제는 용감했다	Lee Joo-bong	
2018–2019	The Shinheung Military School	신흥무관학교	Dong-gyu	

== Discography ==
=== Extended plays ===
Year	Title	Notes	Ref.
2016	Be With You	Mandarin	

=== Full album ===
Year	Title	Notes	Ref.
2025	Assemble	Japanese, includes 6 songs from released singles and 4 new songs: "Celebration", "Glass", "Feel me,feel you" , and "My Christmas Wish"	

=== Singles ===
Year	Title	Album	Ref.
2011	"Meet-Again Meet Again" (다시 만나면)	Warrior Baek Dong-soo OST	
2011	"Oh-Sing-Sing-Men Oh Sing Sing Men" (오싱싱맨) (with Lee Kwang-soo, Kim Young-kwang, Shin Won-ho, Sung-je, and Ji-hyuk)	Bachelor's Vegetable Store OST; Japanese release	
2011	"Your Warmth" (너의온기)	Bachelor's Vegetable Store OST; Japanese release	
2012	"Fill Up" (채운다)	Five Fingers OST	
2014	"To the Butterfly" (나비에게)	Empress Ki OST	
2015	"I Will Protect You" (지켜줄게)	Healer OST	
2016	"Kissing You"	7 First Kisses OST	
2017	"101 Reasons Why I Like You" (네가 좋은 백 한가지 이유)	Suspicious Partner OST	
2019	"When Love Passes By" (사랑이 지나가면)	Melting Me Softly OST	
2022	"Magic In You" (with Sondia, Ye.Z and Lee Yeseul)	The Sound of Magic OST	
2022	"Do You Believe In Magic?" (당신 마술을 믿습니까?)	The Sound of Magic OST	
2022	"Don't Make Me Dream" (나를 꿈꾸게 하지 마세요) (with Choi Sung-eun)	The Sound of Magic OST	
2022	"Merry-Go-Round" (회전목마) (with Choi Sung-eun)	The Sound of Magic OST	
2022	"A Curse of Asphalt" (아스팔트의 저주)	The Sound of Magic OST	
2022	"Annarasumanara" (아저씨. 마술을 믿으세요?) (with Choi Sung-eun)	The Sound of Magic OST	
2023	"Thank You for Being There"	"Thank You for Being There" (Released in Japan)	
2023	"That You Were There" ("Boku Ga Ita Koto")	"Thank You for Being There" (Released in Japan)	
2024	"The Wind of Spring"	"The Wind of Spring" (Released in Japan)	
2024	"Spring is You"	"The Wind of Spring" (Released in Japan)	
2024	"SHINY TRIP"	"SHINY TRIP" (Released in Japan)	
2024	"Starry Night Driver"	"SHINY TRIP" (Released in Japan)	

== Accolades ==
=== Awards and nominations ===
Name of the award ceremony, year presented, category, nominee of the award, and the result of the nomination
Award ceremony	Year	Category	Nominee / Work	Result	Ref.
APAN Star Awards	2014	Excellence Award, Actor in a Serial Drama	Empress Ki	Nominated	
APAN Star Awards	2015	Excellence Award, Actor in a Miniseries	Healer	Nominated	
APAN Star Awards	2021	Excellence Award, Actor in a Miniseries	Backstreet Rookie	Nominated	
APAN Star Awards	2021	Popular Star Award, Actor	Backstreet Rookie	Nominated	
APAN Star Awards	2022	Global Star Award	The Sound of Magic	Won	
APAN Star Awards	2024	Top Excellence Award, Actor in a Miniseries	Welcome to Samdal-ri	Won	
Asia Artist Awards	2019	Asia Celebrity (Actor)	Ji Chang-wook	Won	
Asia Artist Awards	2019	Best Actor	Ji Chang-wook	Won	
Asia Artist Awards	2026	Popularity Award – Actor	Ji Chang-wook	Pending	
Asian Film Awards	2023	AFA Next Generation Award	Ji Chang-wook	Honoured	
Baeksang Arts Awards	2017	Best New Actor – Film	Fabricated City	Nominated	
China TV Drama Awards	2015	Most Popular Actor (Overseas)	Healer	Won	
KBS Drama Awards	2010	Best New Actor	Smile Again	Nominated	
KBS Drama Awards	2011	Excellence Award, Actor in a Daily Drama	Smile Again	Won	
KBS Drama Awards	2014	Excellence Award, Actor in a Mid-length Drama	Healer	Nominated	
KBS Drama Awards	2014	Popularity Award, actor	Healer	Won	
KBS Drama Awards	2014	Best Couple Award	Ji Chang-wook with Park Min-young; Healer	Won	
Korea's Best Dresser Swan Awards	2016	Best Dressed Actor	The K2	Won	
Korea Drama Awards	2011	Best New Actor	Smile Again	Nominated	
Korea Drama Awards	2014	Top Excellence Award, actor	Empress Ki	Nominated	
Korean Film Producers Association Awards	2024	Best Supporting Actor	Revolver	Won	
MBC Drama Awards	2013	Excellence Award, Actor in a Special Project Drama		Won	
SBS Drama Awards	2011	New Star Award	Warrior Baek Dong-soo	Won	
SBS Drama Awards	2012	Excellence Award, Actor in a Weekend/Daily Drama	Five Fingers	Nominated	
SBS Drama Awards	2017	Top Excellence Award, Actor in a Wednesday-Thursday Drama	Suspicious Partner	Nominated	
SBS Drama Awards	2017	Best Couple Award	Ji Chang-wook with Nam Ji-hyun; Suspicious Partner	Nominated	
SBS Drama Awards	2020	Top Excellence Award, Actor in a Miniseries Fantasy/Romance Drama	Backstreet Rookie	Nominated	
SBS Drama Awards	2020	Best Couple Award	Ji Chang-wook with Kim You-jung; Backstreet Rookie	Nominated	
Seoul International Drama Awards	2014	Outstanding Korean Actor	Empress Ki	Nominated	
The Musical Awards	2013	Best New Actor	The Days	Won	

=== State honors ===
Name of country, year given, and name of honor
Country	Award ceremony	Year	Honor or award	Ref.
South Korea	Korean Popular Culture and Arts Awards (Note: Honors are given at the Korean Popular Culture and Arts Awards, arranged by the Korea Creative Content Agency and hosted by the Ministry of Culture, Sports and Tourism. They are awarded to those who have contributed to the arts and South Korea's pop culture.)	2025	Minister of Culture, Sports and Tourism Commendation	

=== Listicles ===
Name of publisher, year listed, name of listicle, and placement
Publisher	Year	Listicle	Placement	Ref.
Korean Film Council	2021	Korean Actors 200 (Note: Introduces 200 actors that best represent the present and future of Korean cinema to the people in the film industry all over the world.)	Included	
