= Moon Ga-young =

South Korean actress (born 1996)

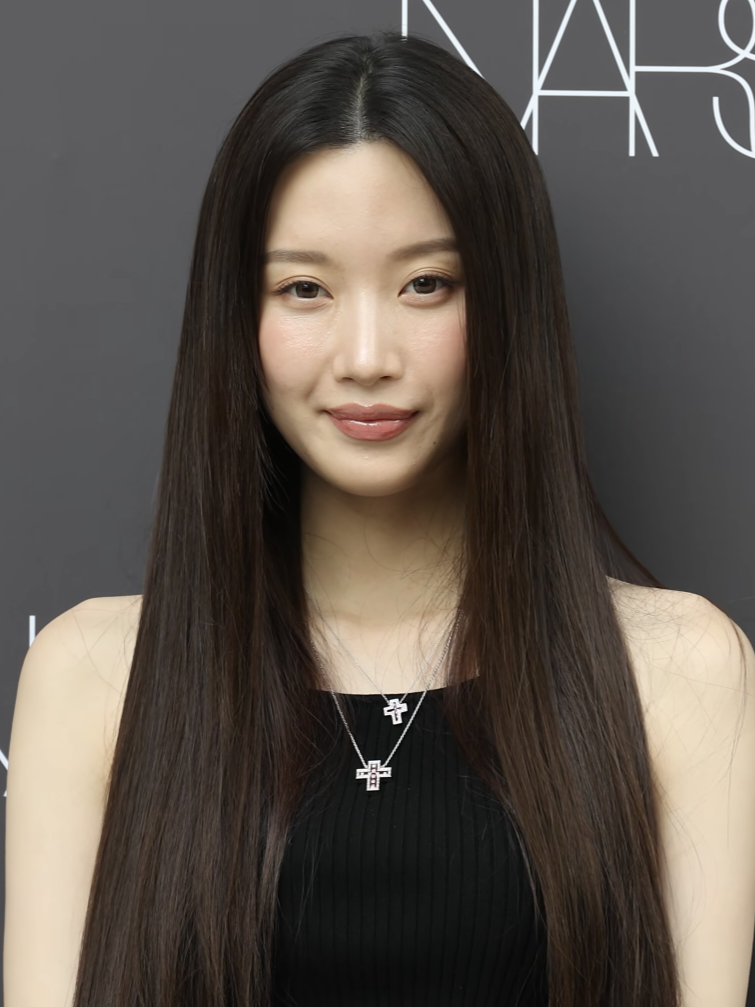
- Moon in July 2026
- Born: July 10, 1996 (age 30); Karlsruhe, Baden-Württemberg, Germany
- Citizenship: South Korea
- Education: Sungkyunkwan University
- Occupations: Actress; model; writer
- Years active: 2006–present
- Agent: Fantagio

Korean name
- Hangul: 문가영
- Hanja: 文佳煐
- RR: Mun Gayeong
- MR: Mun Kayŏng

Signature
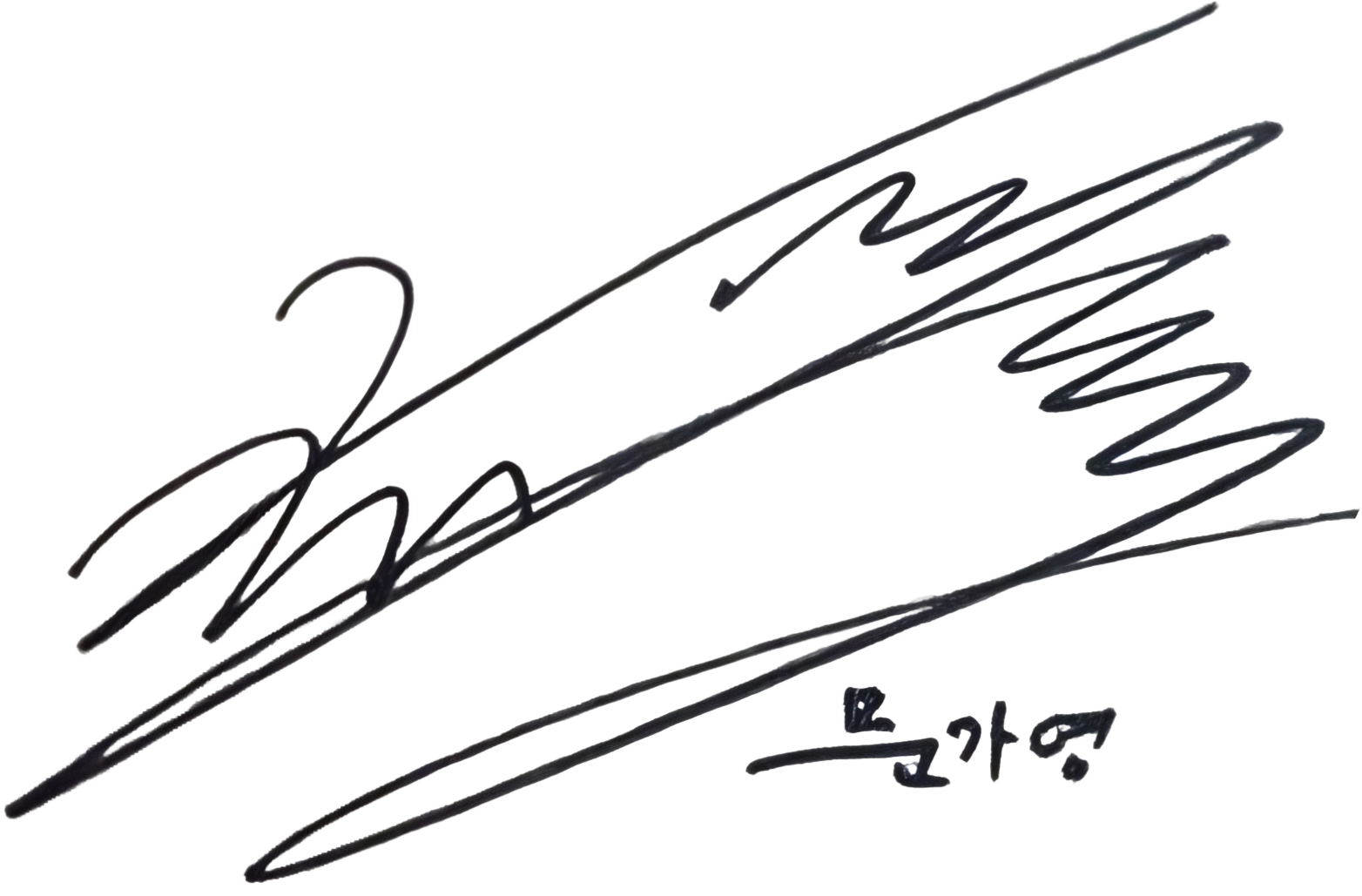

Moon Ga-young (Korean: 문가영; born July 10, 1996) is a South Korean actress and model. In 2005, she started on her career as a child model. The following year, in 2006, she made her debut as a child actress with the film Bloody Reunion.

She is best known for her roles in Heartstrings (2011), Exo Next Door (2015), Tempted (2018), Welcome to Waikiki 2 (2019), Find Me in Your Memory (2020), True Beauty (2020–2021), Link: Eat, Love, Kill (2022), The Interest of Love (2022–2023) and My Dearest Nemesis (2025).

== Early life and education ==
Moon was born on July 10, 1996, in Karlsruhe, Baden-Württemberg, Germany, to South Korean parents as the second daughter of two siblings. Her father, who majored in physics, and her mother, who studied music (piano), met as international students in Germany and got married. In 2005, her family moved back to South Korea when she was in third grade of elementary school.

Moon graduated from an all-girls middle school and high school. Moon is also fluent in German and English as a result of her time in Germany. She can also play the piano, flute, and perform ballet. In November 2014, Moon successfully completed her college scholastic test. By January 2015, she enrolled as a freshman in the Class of '15 at Sungkyunkwan University. She chose to study in the Department of Theater and Film to pursue her passion for acting and classical literature.

== Career ==
=== 2005–2010: Early career as child actress and model ===
Moon was first scouted as a child model for a clothing magazine in Germany while being pushed in a stroller by her mother. Upon the family's return to South Korea in 2005, her mother and uncle submitted photos of Moon and her older sister to a modeling contest. While the submission was intended as a casual gesture, Moon was subsequently selected as a model for a children's fashion catalog.

In 2006, Moon began her career as child actress a child actress, debuting in the film Bloody Reunion. She appeared in several film projects over the following years, providing her voice for Black House (2007) and appearing in minor roles in Shadows in the Palace (2007), Our Town (2007), and Do You See Seoul? (2008).

Concurrently, she appeared in a series of television dramas, starting with Hometown over the Hill (2007) and continuing with Bitter Sweet Life (2008), Ja Myung Go (2009), Friend, Our Legend (2009), The Reputable Family (2010), and Bad Guy (2010). Throughout this period, she was an active child performer alongside peers such as Yeo Jin-goo, Kim You-jung, and Kim So-hyun. During middle school, she took a hiatus from acting, both by choice and due to casting difficulties, after a growth spurt of over 10 centimeters made her physically too tall for traditional child roles.

=== 2011–2016: Teen roles and transition to more mature roles ===
She was well-loved for her portrayal of Jung-hyun, the little sister of Lee Shin (acted by Jung Yong-hwa) in MBC TV Wednesday-Thursday drama Heartstrings (2011), directed by Pyo Min-soo and scripted by Lee Myung-sook.

While in high school, Moon made her mark as the mysterious character Seohyun in Lee Si-young's Killer Toon, directed by Kim Yong-gyun and released on June 27, 2013. This breakthrough role significantly boosted her prominence. In 2013, she was also cast in the KBS TV weekend drama Wang's Family, written by Moon Young-nam and directed by Jin Hyun-wook. Moon portrayed Wang Hae-bak, the fourth daughter of the Wang family, who, despite being a high school student absorbed in her smartphone and rarely communicating with her family, impresses everyone with her exceptional academic performance and resourcefulness.

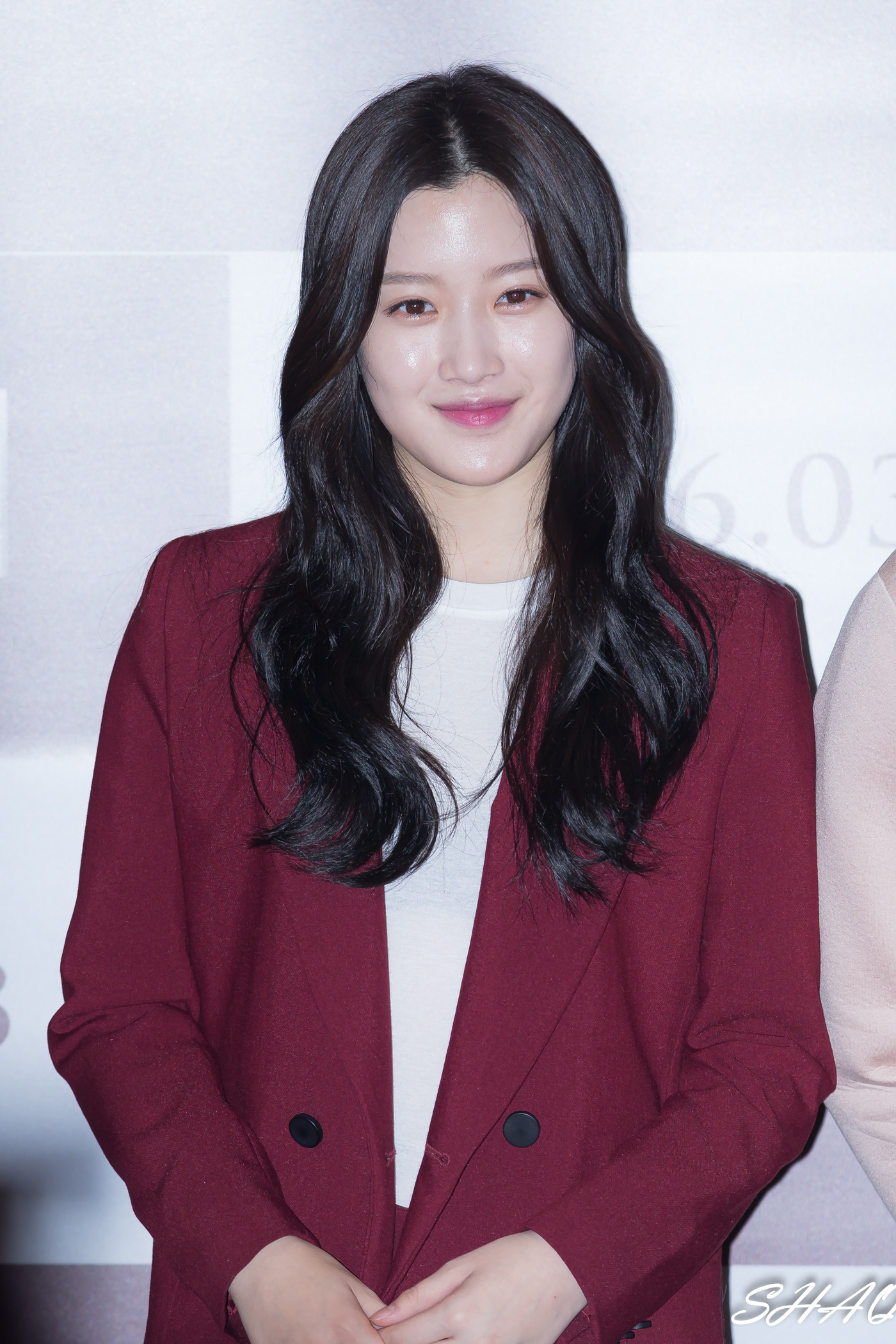
Moon in 2016

In April 2013, she gained attention for her performance alongside Baekhyun on SBS's Inkigayo, which led her to trend at the top of real-time search terms on various portal sites. Furthermore, Moon was chosen to portray Oh-reum, a ghost with a compelling backstory, in tvN's new Monday-Tuesday drama Who Are You? which premiered on July 29, 2013. Her character appears in the first two episodes of the series, which stars So Yi-hyun, Ok Taec-yeon, and Kim Jae-wook.

In 2014, while in her final year of high school, Moon transitioned to teen roles with her first lead performance in the Mnet mystery romance drama Mimi (2014). Starring alongside TVXQ's Changmin, she portrayed the title character Mimi, an innocent girl harboring a secret while suffering from an unnamed illness. The following year, she played the female protagonist in the Naver TV web drama Exo Next Door, appearing alongside members of the boy band Exo.

In 2016, Moon played a supporting role in the SBS television series Don't Dare to Dream. Alongside characters played by Kim Jung-hyun and Ahn Woo-yeon, her character formed a trio referred to as the "three musketeers." Ppal-gang was depicted as a teenager who prioritized academics while maintaining a protective barrier against the adults who had caused her emotional distress.

In 2017, Moon appeared in a supporting role in the medical fantasy drama Live Up to Your Name. She portrayed Dong Mak-gae, the loyal assistant to Heo Im (Kim Nam-gil). Her performance earned praise for her portrayal of a cross-dressing character within the historical setting of the series. That same year, Moon starred in the KBS drama special Waltzing Alone, which marked her first adult role after turning 20. She portrayed Kim Min-sun, a struggling job seeker and 2009 high school graduate. The character, depicted as older than Moon's actual age at the time, was characterized as an individual facing career setbacks and social difficulties.

=== 2018–2023: Leading actress and rising popularity ===
In 2018, Moon took on the lead role in the romance drama Tempted, based on the 18th century French novel Les Liaisons dangereuses. She played Choi Soo-ji, the daughter of a medical foundation chairman who schemes to seduce Kwon Si-hyeon (portrayed by Woo Do-hwan). Moon's performance earned her the Excellence Award for Best Actress in a Monday-Tuesday Drama at the MBC Drama Awards. On July 3, 2018, she transferred from SM C&C to KeyEast, an agency acquired by SM Entertainment in March 2018. In 2019, Moon starred in the JTBC comedy series Welcome to Waikiki 2 as Han Soo-yeon, the shared first love of three friends played by Lee Yi-kyung, Kim Seon-ho, and Shin Hyun-soo. The role depicts a woman forced to seek financial independence after her wedding is canceled following the collapse of her father's business.

In the following year, Moon starred as the female lead in the romance series Find Me in Your Memory, portraying Yeo Ha-jin, an actress and influencer who has suppressed her past memories. Her character becomes involved with a news anchor (played by Kim Dong-wook) diagnosed with hyperthymesia, a condition involving near-perfect memory. It was broadcast on MBC TV from March 18 to May 13, 2020. Later, Moon took on the lead role of Lim Ju-kyung in the tvN series True Beauty, alongside Cha Eun-woo, Hwang In-youp, and Park Yoo-na, which aired in December 2020. Based on the Line Webtoon Line Webtoon of the same name by Yaongyi, the role follows a high school student who masters the art of makeup to transform her appearance after experiencing bullying and discrimination based on her looks.

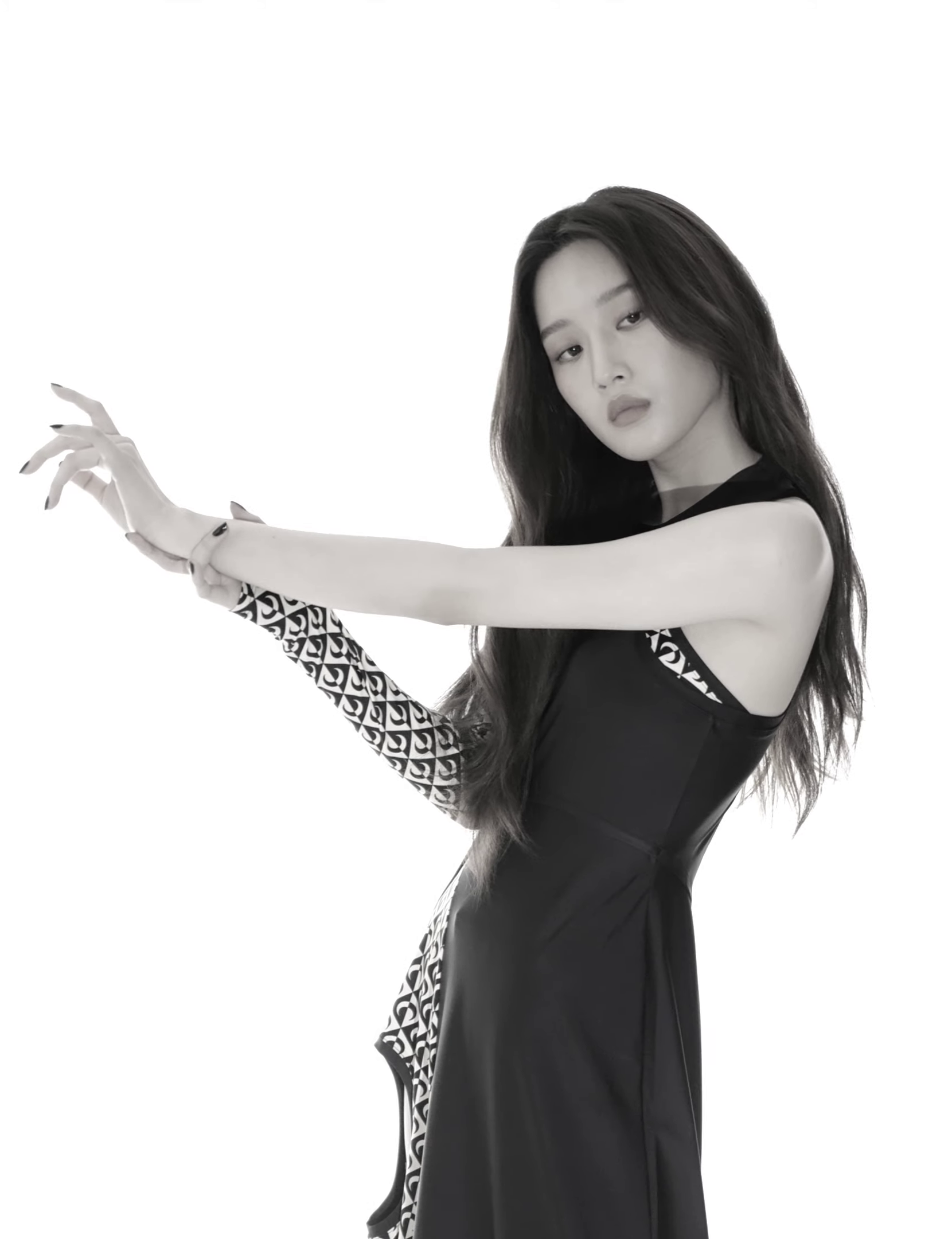
Moon for Marie Claire Korea in 2021

In 2021, Moon starred alongside Yoon Kye-sang in the music video for "Cheers," a track by Lee Chan-hyuk, Colde, and Sogumm, produced by Code Kunst. Directed by Kwon Oh-jun, the project was part of Elle Korea's "Reconnect 2021" initiative, a campaign designed to support and encourage youth.

In 2022, Moon reunited with director Hong Jong-chan for the tvN fantasy-melodrama Link: Eat, Love, Kill, portraying Noh Da-hyun, a trainee at Jihwayang restaurant who became love interest of Eun Gye-hoon (portrayed by Yeo Jin-goo), a sous chef at the same restaurant. In the end of 2022, Moon starred in the JTBC office-romance drama The Interest of Love. Moon portrayed Ahn Soo-young, a head teller at KCU Bank's Yeongpo branch who maintains a cynical and guarded view of romance. Her perspective begins to shift after she becomes involved with her colleague Ha Sang-soo (portrayed by Yoo Yeon-seok) who introduces new emotional complexity to her life.

=== 2024–to present: Literary debut and continued screen career ===
In February 2024, Moon debuted as an author with the publication of her first prose collection, Pata, featuring personal thoughts and reflections. The collection's pre-sale on February 27 reached 2,000 copies, leading to an immediate second printing, a performance noted by industry analysts as a significant achievement in South Korea's publishing sector. In July 2024, publisher Wisdom House announced international distribution agreements for the title with AtmanBooks in Taiwan and ShiraMedia in Indonesia.

In her screen career, Moon collaborated with director Hong Jong-chan for Daesung's "Falling Slowly" music video, released on March 5, 2024. The project featured a reunion with her Welcome to Waikiki 2 co-star, Kim Seon-ho. On July 1, 2024, Moon signed an exclusive contract with management company Peak J Entertainment. Shortly after, tvN confirmed her as the lead alongside Choi Hyun-wook in the series My Dearest Nemesis. The series is based on Black Salt Dragon, a webtoon by Hye Jin-yang. The drama is directed by Lee Soo-hyun, known for Delightfully Deceitful and written by Kim Soo-yeon. It was produced by Studio N and planned by Studio Dragon.

Moon also starred in the romantic melodrama Once We Were Us, directed by Kim Do-young, a remake of 2018 Chinese film Us and Them directed by Rene Liu. Portraying Han Jung-won opposite Koo Kyo-hwan, she depicted a character's ten-year progression from a rural upbringing to adult life in Seoul. Distributed by Showbox, the film was released in South Korea on December 31, 2025. The film achieved commercial success, becoming the first domestic romance in several years to surpass two million admissions and maintaining a top position at the South Korean box office through early 2026.

On July 3, 2026 Moon signed an exclusive contract with Fantagio.

== Endorsements ==
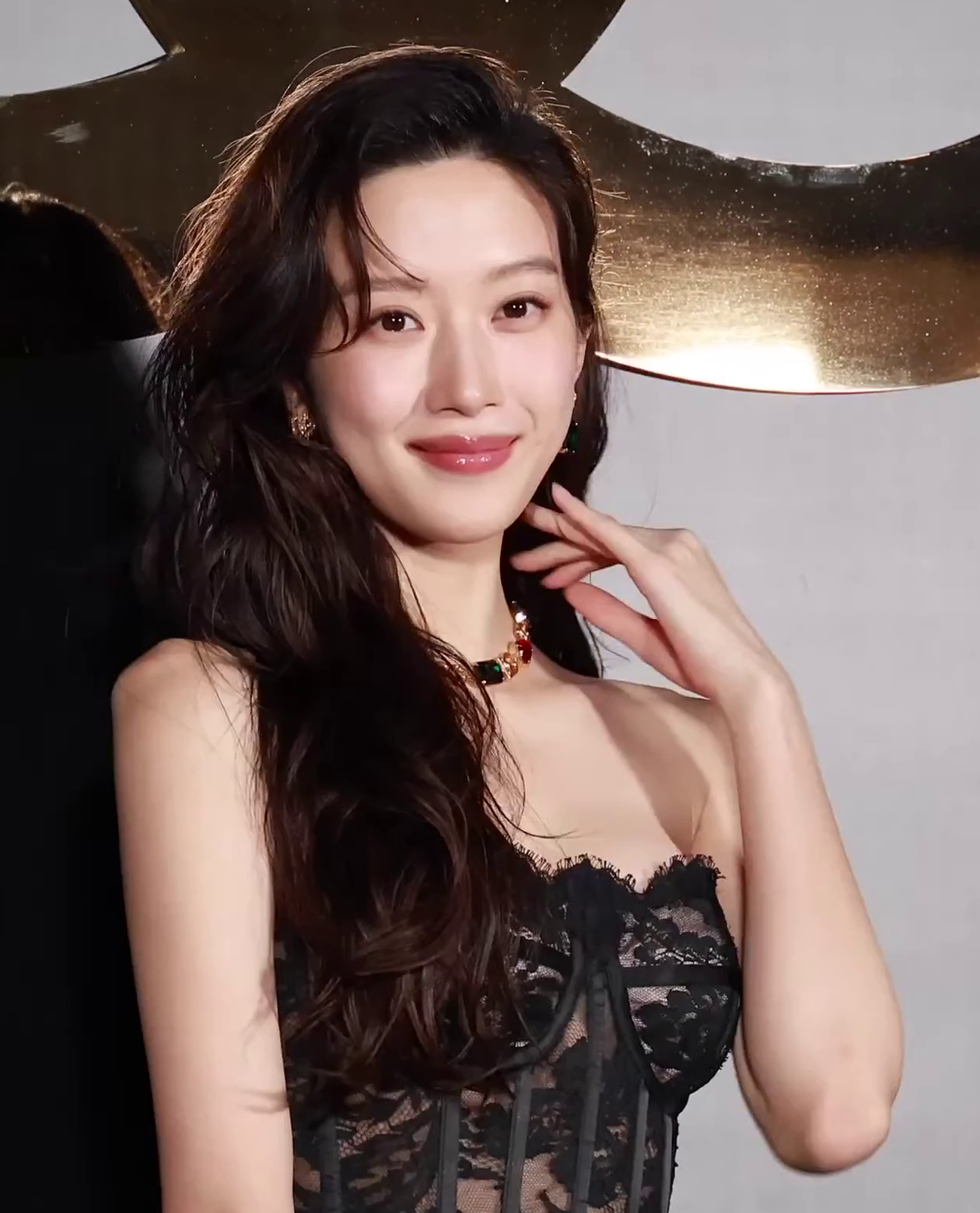
Moon at a Dolce & Gabbana event in 2024

Moon debuted as a child model in 2005. After being an adult actress, her modeling career grew in 2021 when she was appointed the exclusive face of hair care brand Vodana. and cosmetics label Dermafirm. That same year, she collaborated with her Welcome to Waikiki 2 co-star Kim Seon-ho for the outdoor apparel brand Nau.

In 2022, Moon’s portfolio grew to include the sports fashion brand Le Coq Sportif and vegan cosmetics brand Dinto. Her presence in high fashion peaked in late 2023; following her appearance at Dolce & Gabbana's Spring/Summer 2024 show in Milan Fashion Week on September 2023. Following the event, the marketing platform Lefty ranked her as the event’s most influential participant, citing her high earned media value. This impact led to a W magazine feature and her subsequent appointment as a global brand ambassador for Dolce & Gabbana in November 2023. Her commercial work also included a reunion with Cha Eun-woo for Hanwha Life Insurance. She concluded the year with a campaign for Calvin Klein in December 2023.

In February 2024, Moon maintained her international fashion presence by attending Dolce & Gabbana’s Fall/Winter show in Milan Fashion Week. In March 2024, Moon was named a Tumi luggage global ambassador.

== Philanthropy ==
On May 20, 2017, as a goodwill ambassador for the international relief NGO Plan Korea, Moon participated in the "Plan Art Market" held at Everland's Rose Garden to commemorate World Children's Day. The event aimed to raise funds for global child relief, specifically supporting the construction of play facilities for a kindergarten in Cambodia.

Proceeds from Moon's March 2024 prose collection, Pata, have supported multiple charitable causes. She donated 100 million won from the book's earnings to Ewha Womans University Medical Center in August 2024, followed by a 50 million won donation via Cointree in February 2026. The latter contribution supports medical and self-reliance projects for women and children in Tulum, Mexico.

== Filmography ==
=== Film ===
Film appearances
Year	Title	Role	Notes	Ref.
2006	Bloody Reunion	young Eun-young		
2007	Bunt	Oh Ye-ryung		
2007	Black House	Chul-yeon	Voice	
2007	Shadows in the Palace	Il-won	Bit part	
2007	Our Town	young So-yeon		
2008	Do You See Seoul?	Bun-rye		
2013	Killer Toon	Jo Seo-hyun		
2015	Salut d'Amour	Kim Ah-young		
2015	Island	Yeon-joo		
2016	Eclipse	Kang Eun-young		
2016	Twenty Again	Soo-mi		
2025	Once We Were Us	Jeong-won		

=== Television series ===
Television series appearances
Year	Title	Role	Notes	Ref.
2006	Fallen Angel, Jenny	Hye-mi		
2007	Cloudy Today	Ri-na		
2007	Prince Hours			
2007	By My Side	young Seo Eun-joo		
2007	Witch Yoo Hee	young Ma Yoo-hee		
2007	Merry Mary	young Hwang Mae-ri		
2007	Hometown Over the Hill	Na Hae-young		
2008	Bitter Sweet Life	Ha Na-ri		
2009	Ja Myung Go	young So-so		
2009	Friend, Our Legend	young Choi Jin-sook		
2010	Goods Friends	Kang Soo-ji		
2010	The Reputable Family	young Han Dan-yi		
2010	Bad Guy	young Hong Tae-ra		
2011	Heartstrings	Lee Jung-hyun		
2012	Just an Ordinary Love Story	young Kim Yoon-hye	Drama Special Series	
2013	Who Are You?	Dan Oh-reum	Cameo (episode 1–2)	
2013	Wang's Family	Wang Hae-bak		
2014	Mimi	Mi-mi		
2015	Exo Next Door	Ji Yeon-hee		
2015	The Merchant: Gaekju 2015	Wol-yi		
2015	Delicious Love	Park Soo-jin		
2016	Secret Healer	Sol-gae		
2016	Don't Dare to Dream	Lee Ppal-gang		
2017	Live Up to Your Name	Dongmakgae		
2017	Waltzing Alone	Kim Min-Sun	KBS Drama Special	
2018	Tempted	Choi Soo-ji		
2019	Welcome to Waikiki 2	Han Soo-yeon		
2020	Find Me in Your Memory	Yeo Ha-jin		
2020–2021	True Beauty	Lim Ju-kyung		
2021	Recipe For Youth	Cha Soo-bin		
2022	Shooting Stars	Yeo Ha-jin	Cameo (episode 8)	
2022	Link: Eat, Love, Kill	Noh Da-hyun		
2022–2023	The Interest of Love	Ahn Soo-young		
2023	Delightfully Deceitful	Min Kang-yoon	Cameo (episode 12)	
2025	My Dearest Nemesis	Baek Soo-jung		
2025	Law and the City	Kang Hee-ji		
2027	Whale Star: The Gyeongseong Mermaid	Heo Su-a		

=== Television shows ===
Television show appearances
Year	Title	Role	Ref.
2009	Sinnara Science	MC	
2019	Bookstore These Days: I'm Reading Books	Cast member	
2020	Food Avengers	Cast member	

=== Hosting ===
Year	Title	Notes	Ref.
2025	39th Golden Disc Awards	with Sung Si-kyung and Cha Eun-woo	

=== Music video appearances ===
Music video appearances
Year	Title	Artist(s)	Ref.
2021	"Cheers" (with Elle Korea)	Code Kunst, Lee Chan-hyuk, Colde, and sogumm	
2024	"Falling Slowly"	Daesung	

== Ambassadorship ==
Year	Title	Ref.
2021	23rd Seoul International Women's Film Festival	

== Bibliography ==
Year	Title	Publisher	Published Date	ISBN	Ref.
2024	Pata (파타)	Wisdom House Co., Ltd	March 6, 2024	979-1-1717-1158-1	

== Accolades ==
=== Awards and nominations ===
Name of the award ceremony, year presented, category, nominee of the award, and the result of the nomination
Award ceremony	Year	Category	Nominee / Work	Result	Ref.
Asia Artist Awards	2021	Emotive Award – Actress	True Beauty	Won	
Asia Artist Awards	2021	Popularity Award – Actress	Moon Ga-young	Nominated	
Asia Artist Awards	2023	Best Acting Performance Award	The Interest of Love	Won	
Asian Culture Awards	2020	Best Korean Actress	True Beauty	Nominated	
Baeksang Arts Awards	2026	Best Actress – Film	Once We Were Us	Won	
Blue Dragon Film Awards	2026	Best Actress	Once We Were Us	Pending	
KBS Drama Awards	2010	Best Young Actress	The Reputable Family	Nominated	
KBS Drama Awards	2013	Best Young Actress	Wang's Family	Nominated	
KBS Drama Awards	2017	Best Actress in a One-Act/Special/Short Drama	Waltzing Alone	Nominated	
Marie Claire Asia Star Awards	2026	Asia Wide Award	Moon Ga-young	Won	
MBC Drama Awards	2018	Excellence Award, Actress in a Monday-Tuesday Drama	Tempted	Won	
MBC Drama Awards	2018	Best New Actress	Tempted	Nominated	
MBC Drama Awards	2020	Best Couple Award	Moon Ga-young (with Kim Dong-wook); Find Me in Your Memory	Won	
MBC Drama Awards	2020	Top Excellence Award, Actress in a Wednesday-Thursday Miniseries	Find Me in Your Memory	Nominated	

=== Listicles ===
Name of publisher, year listed, name of listicle, and placement
Publisher	Year	Listicle	Placement	Ref.
Cine21	2021	New Actress to watch out for in 2022	6th (Note: Tied with Go Min-si, Park Eun-bin, Keum Sae-rok, Joo Hyun-young, Park Gyu-young, Lee Soo-kyung, Roh Yoon-seo, Gong Seung-yeon, Lee Se-young, IU, Shin Hyun-been, Park Ji-hu, Han So-hee, Jung Ji-so, Bang Min-ah, Jeon Jong-seo, Roh Jeong-eui)	
