= Bloody Reunion =

- Theatrical poster
- Hangul: 스승의 은혜
- RR: Seuseungui eunhye
- MR: Sŭsŭngŭi ŭnhye
- Directed by: Im Dae-woong
- Written by: Park Se-yeol
- Starring: Oh Mi-hee; Seo Young-hee
- Cinematography: Kim Yoon-su
- Edited by: Park Gok-ji
- Distributed by: Show East
- Release date: August 3, 2006
- Running time: 93 minutes
- Country: South Korea
- Language: Korean
- Box office: $3,094,683

Bloody Reunion (Korean: 스승의 은혜; RR: Seuseungui eunhye) (aka To Sir, with Love, My Teacher or Teacher's Mercy) is a 2006 South Korean slasher film, and the feature film debut of director Im Dae-Woong.

== Plot ==
Detective Ma investigates a mass murder at the residence of Ms. Park. Five were killed with two survivors: Ms. Park and her caretaker, Mi-Ja. Mi-Ja recounts her story to Ma.

Mi-Ja takes care of her ex-teacher, Ms. Park. They organize a class reunion with Ms. Park's past students: Se-Ho, Eun-Young, Dal-Bong, Sun-Hee, Myung-Ho, and Jung-Won. Each resent Ms. Park for different reasons: the couple Se-Ho and Eun-Young because of Ms. Park's belittling of their poverty; Dal-Bong because of his cast leg caused by Ms. Park punishing him with repeated squats after losing a relay at track; Sun-Hee because of Ms. Park's criticizing of her former obesity; and Myung-Ho because of Ms. Park sexually abusing him. The friendless and quiet Jung-Won, once ridiculed for defecating in class, stopped attending school when his mother was hit by a car. Nevertheless, they all try to maintain a facade of jolliness for the reunion.

However, tensions arise as the former classmates become more open about their anger. Se-Ho drunkenly explodes during the barbecue party and accuses the others of lying to themselves. A bunny-masked figure later drags him to the basement, where he is killed. Eun-Young tries to drown Ms. Park while the latter is bathing, though it fails. She is attacked next by the bunny figure and killed. Dal-Bong tries to attack Ms. Park but is caught by the bunny figure, who inserts insects into his ear to kill him. Throughout the murders, flashbacks show the students laughing at Ms. Park's deformed son, who wore a bunny mask to hide his face. Only Jung-Won wanted to befriend him, but Ms. Park mistakenly assumed him the bully. Sun-Hee tries to throw Ms. Park off the cliff, but is interrupted by Mi-Ja. In the ensuing struggle, Sun-Hee falls off instead and dies. Mi-Ja is knocked out by Myung-Ho, who would have set Ms. Park on fire if not for the bunny figure killing him. The figure is revealed to be Jung-Won.

Detective Ma investigates Jung-Won's supposed apartment. All he finds is his mother's decaying corpse, women's clothing, and articles about the success of Ms. Park's ex-students, contrary to Mi-Ja's claims. It is revealed that there is no male student of Ms. Park's bearing the name "Jung-Won"; it is instead the real name of Mi-Ja. She fabricated the story for the police: she was the one who was poor and overweight, broke her leg after doing Ms. Park's punishment, and was mocked when her period stained her clothes in class. Her mother rushed to school to confront Ms. Park and was struck by a car. She became handicapped and died when Jung-Won was an adult. Jung-Won then took the identity of Mi-Ja and became Ms. Park's caretaker until she could kill her classmates at the reunion.

Jung-Won drives Ms. Park to the beach and vents her frustration at her before committing suicide by jumping from the pier, while Ms. Park can only watch. The film closes with Ms. Park's wheelchair on the pier, with Ms. Park implied to have committed suicide as well.

== Cast ==
- Oh Mi-hee as Ms. Park, the teacher
- Seo Young-hee as Mi-Ja/Jung-Won, former student and caretaker
- Lee Ji-Hyun as Sun-Hee
- Lee Dong-kyu as Myung-Ho
- Yu Seol-ah as Eun-Young
- Park Hyo-jun as Dal-Bong
- Yeo Hyun-soo as Se-Ho
- Jang Seong-won as Jung-Won
- Kim Eung-soo as Detective Ma
- Lee Ji-hyun as Sun-hee
- Moon Ga-young
