= NewJeans discography =

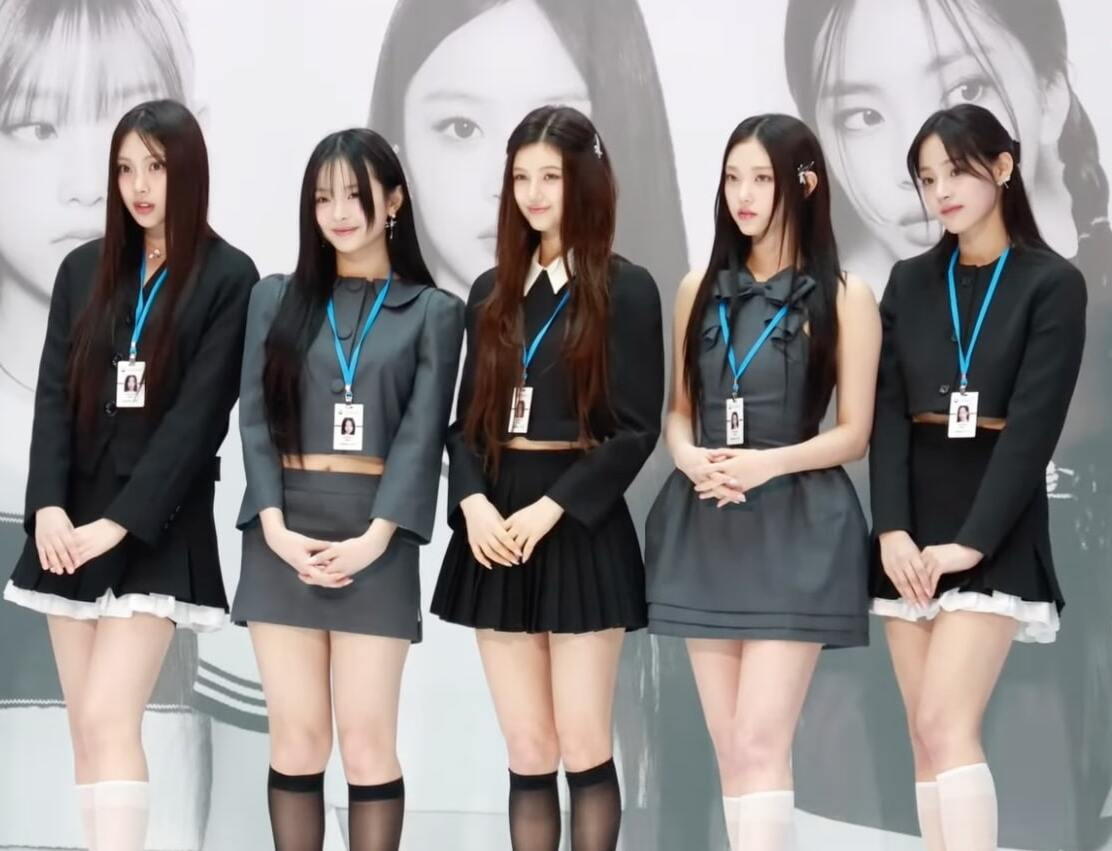
- NewJeans in 2024
- EPs: 2
- Singles: 10
- Single albums: 3
- Remix albums: 1
- Promotional singles: 5

South Korean girl group NewJeans has released two extended plays, three single albums, ten singles, and five promotional singles. The group debuted under the independent music label ADOR in July 2022, and is currently composed of members Minji, Hanni, Haerin, and Hyein.

The group's first release, their self-titled extended play (2022), topped the South Korean Circle Album Chart and became the best-selling debut album by a K-pop female act, with over one million copies sold. It was supported by three singles: "Attention", "Hype Boy", and "Cookie". Both "Attention" and "Hype Boy" received a platinum certification for streaming in South Korea and a gold certification for streaming in Japan. The former topped the South Korean Circle Digital Chart, and the latter became the longest-running song on the Billboard Global 200 by a K-pop female act.

NewJeans' first single album, OMG (2023), was their second number one on the Circle Album Chart and reached the top 10 on charts in Japan and Portugal. It sold over one million copies in South Korea and was supported by two singles that were both certified platinum for streaming in Japan: "Ditto" and "OMG". The former was also certified platinum for streaming in South Korea and became the longest-running number-one song on the Circle Digital Chart and the group's first entry on international charts including the Canadian Hot 100, the UK Singles Chart, and the US Billboard Hot 100.

NewJeans' second EP, Get Up, sold over a million copies and reached the top 10 on charts in South Korea, Austria, Canada, France, Germany, Japan, New Zealand, and Switzerland among others. In the United States, the EP earned NewJeans their first entry and number-one on the Billboard 200. Get Up was supported by three singles: "Super Shy", Cool with You", and "ETA". "Super Shy" earned NewJeans their third number-one on the Circle Digital Chart and became their best-performing track on international charts.

== Extended plays ==
List of extended plays, showing selected details, selected chart positions, sales figures, and certifications
Title	Details	Peak chart positions										Sales	Certifications
Title	Details	KOR	AUT	CAN	FRA	GER	JPN	NZ	SWI	UK	US	Sales	Certifications
New Jeans	Released: August 1, 2022; Label: ADOR; Formats: CD, digital download, streaming	1	—	—	—	91	12	—	—	—	— (Note: New Jeans did not enter the Billboard 200, but peaked at number 32 on the Top Album Sales.)	KOR: 1,849,511; JPN: 20,251	KMCA: Million; KMCA: 2× Platinum (Weverse)
Get Up	Released: July 21, 2023; Label: ADOR; Formats: CD, digital download, streaming	2	7	4	5	10	4	3	8	15	1	KOR: 2,357,912; JPN: 63,189; US: 332,000	BPI: Silver; KMCA: Million; KMCA: Platinum (Weverse)
"—" denotes a recording that did not chart or was not released in that territory.

== Single albums ==
List of single albums, showing selected details, selected chart positions, sales figures, and certifications
Title	Details	Peak chart positions					Sales	Certifications
Title	Details	KOR	BEL (FL)	CRO	JPN	POR	Sales	Certifications
OMG	Released: January 2, 2023; Label: ADOR; Formats: CD, digital download, streaming	1	69	13	2	8	KOR: 1,849,265; JPN: 35,418	KMCA: Million; KMCA: 2× Platinum (Weverse)
How Sweet	Released: May 24, 2024; Label: ADOR; Formats: CD, digital download, streaming	1	—	9	6	—	KOR: 1,336,481; JPN: 52,285	KMCA: Million; KMCA: Platinum (Weverse)
Supernatural	Released: June 21, 2024; Label: ADOR; Formats: CD, digital download, streaming	1	—	14	4	—	KOR: 1,492,594; JPN: 82,119	KMCA: Million; KMCA: Platinum (Weverse); RIAJ: Gold
"—" denotes a recording that did not chart or was not released in that territory.

== Remix albums ==
List of remix albums, showing selected details, selected chart positions, and sales figures
Title	Details	Peak chart positions		Sales
Title	Details	JPN Hot	JPN Dig.	Sales
NJWMX	Released: December 19, 2023; Label: ADOR; Formats: Digital download, streaming	62	14	JPN: 566

== Singles ==
=== Korean singles ===
List of Korean singles, showing year released, selected chart positions, sales, certifications, and name of the album
Title	Year	Peak chart positions										Sales	Certifications (Note: All certifications are for streaming)	Album
Title	Year	KOR	KOR Songs	AUS	CAN	JPN Hot	NZ	SGP	TWN	US	WW	Sales	Certifications	Album
"Attention"	2022	1	1	—	—	— (Note: "Attention" did not enter the Billboard Japan Hot 100, but peaked at number three on the Heatseekers Songs.)	— (Note: "Attention" did not enter the NZ Top 40 Singles Chart, but peaked at number 26 on the NZ Hot Singles Chart.)	7	25	—	54		KMCA: 2× Platinum; RIAJ: Platinum; RMNZ: Gold	New Jeans
"Hype Boy"	2022	2	1	—	95	41	—	5	7	—	52		KMCA: 3× Platinum; RIAJ: 2× Platinum; RMNZ: Gold	New Jeans
"Cookie"	2022	9	6	—	—	— (Note: "Cookie" did not enter the Billboard Japan Hot 100, but peaked at number nine on the Heatseekers Songs.)	—	— (Note: "Cookie" did not enter the RIAS Top Streaming Chart, but peaked at number 15 on the RIAS Top Regional Chart.)	—	—	— (Note: "Cookie" did not enter the Billboard Global 200, but peaked at number 198 on the Global Excl. US chart.)		KMCA: Platinum; RIAJ: Gold	New Jeans
"Ditto"	2022	1	1	54	43	9	— (Note: "Ditto" did not enter the NZ Top 40 Singles Chart, but peaked at number 11 on the NZ Hot Singles Chart.)	1	1	82	8	JPN: 14,117; WW: 4,000	KMCA: 2× Platinum; RIAJ: 3× Platinum; RMNZ: Platinum	OMG
"OMG"	2023	2	1	43	35	7	31	1	1	74	10	JPN: 3,334	BPI: Silver; KMCA: Platinum; RIAJ: 2× Platinum; RMNZ: Platinum	OMG
"Super Shy"	2023	1	1	14	26	10	16	1	1	48	2	JPN: 1,655; US: 2,000; WW: 6,000	BPI: Silver; KMCA: Platinum; RIAJ: Platinum; RMNZ: Platinum	Get Up
"Cool with You"	2023	14	13	40	57	43	— (Note: "Cool with You" did not enter the NZ Top 40 Singles Chart, but peaked at number eight on the NZ Hot Singles Chart.)	4	6	93	22			Get Up
"ETA"	2023	2	2	34	48	8	36	3	5	81	12	JPN: 13,364	KMCA: Platinum; RIAJ: Platinum; RMNZ: Gold	Get Up
"How Sweet"	2024	2	2	87	67	14	— (Note: "How Sweet" did not enter the NZ Top 40 Singles Chart, but peaked at number four on the NZ Hot Singles Chart.)	5	1	— (Note: "How Sweet" did not enter the Billboard Hot 100, but peaked at number 12 on the Bubbling Under Hot 100 chart.)	15	JPN: 5,146	KMCA: Platinum; RIAJ: Gold	How Sweet
"—" denotes a recording that did not chart or was not released in that territory.

=== Japanese singles ===
List of Japanese singles, showing year released, selected chart positions, sales, certifications, and name of the album
Title	Year	Peak chart positions										Sales	Certifications	Album
Title	Year	KOR	KOR Songs	CAN	JPN Hot	MLY Songs	NZ Hot	SGP	TWN	US World	WW	Sales	Certifications	Album
"Supernatural"	2024	4	1	100	7	23	13	10	7	2	25	JPN: 11,089	RIAJ: Gold	Supernatural

== Promotional singles ==
List of promotional singles, showing year released, selected chart positions, and name of the album
Title	Year	Peak chart positions								Certifications	Album
Title	Year	KOR	KOR Songs	CAN	JPN Hot	NZ Hot	TWN	US Bub.	WW	Certifications	Album
"Zero"	2023	12	11	—	58	29	—	—	— (Note: "Zero" did not enter the Billboard Global 200, but peaked at number 154 on the Global Excl. US chart.)		Non-album single
"Be Who You Are (Real Magic)" (Jon Batiste featuring NewJeans, J.I.D, and Camilo)	2023	—	—	—	— (Note: "Be Who You Are (Real Magic)" did not enter the Billboard Japan Hot 100, but peaked at number 7 on the Billboard Japan Hot Overseas.)	—	—	—	—		World Music Radio
"Beautiful Restriction" (아름다운 구속)	2023	151	—	—	—	—	—	—	—		A Time Called You OST
"Gods"	2023	31	23	74	—	11	6	19	75	SNEP: Gold	Non-album single
"Our Night Is More Beautiful Than Your Day" (우리의 밤은 당신의 낮보다 아름답다)	2023	183	—	—	—	—	—	—	—		My Demon OST
"—" denotes a recording that did not chart or was not released in that territory.

== Other charted songs ==
List of other charted songs, showing year released, selected chart positions, certifications, and name of the album
Title	Year	Peak chart positions										Sales	Certifications	Album
Title	Year	KOR	KOR Songs	AUS	CAN	JPN Hot	NZ Hot	TWN	US Bub.	VIE	WW	Sales	Certifications	Album
"Hurt"	2022	85	17	—	—	—	—	—	—	53	—			New Jeans
"New Jeans"	2023	8	2	53	62	46	6	9	5	14	25		RIAJ: Gold; RMNZ: Gold	Get Up
"Get Up"	2023	33	—	82	79	— (Note: "Get Up" did not enter the Billboard Japan Hot 100, but peaked at number 89 on the Streaming Songs.)	7	22	22	21	57			Get Up
"ASAP"	2023	20	25	64	70	79	9	13	16	13	33			Get Up
"Ditto" (250 remix)	2023	— (Note: "Ditto" (250 remix) did not enter the Circle Digital Chart, but peaked at number 64 on the Circle Download Chart.)	—	—	—	—	—	—	—	—	—			NJWMX
"OMG" (FRNK remix)	2023	— (Note: "OMG" (FRNK Remix) did not enter the Circle Digital Chart, but peaked at number 49 on the Circle Download Chart.)	—	—	—	—	—	—	—	—	—			NJWMX
"Attention" (250 remix)	2023	— (Note: "Attention" (250 remix) did not enter the Circle Digital Chart, but peaked at number 77 on the Circle Download Chart.)	—	—	—	—	—	—	—	—	—			NJWMX
"Hype Boy" (250 remix)	2023	— (Note: "Hype Boy" (250 remix) did not enter the Circle Digital Chart, but peaked at number 74 on the Circle Download Chart.)	—	—	—	—	—	—	—	—	—			NJWMX
"Cookie" (FRNK remix)	2023	— (Note: "Cookie" (FRNK remix) did not enter the Circle Digital Chart, but peaked at number 86 on the Circle Download Chart.)	—	—	—	—	—	—	—	—	—			NJWMX
"Hurt" (250 remix)	2023	— (Note: "Hurt" (250 remix) did not enter the Circle Digital Chart, but peaked at number 91 on the Circle Download Chart.)	—	—	—	—	—	—	—	—	—			NJWMX
"Bubble Gum"	2024	3	3	—	—	40	5	7	—	—	30	JPN: 8,825	RIAJ: Gold	How Sweet
"Right Now"	2024	25	15	—	—	47	19	20	—	—	81	JPN: 3,578		Supernatural
"—" denotes a recording that did not chart or was not released in that territory.
