= List of awards and nominations received by NewJeans =

NewJeans awards and nominations
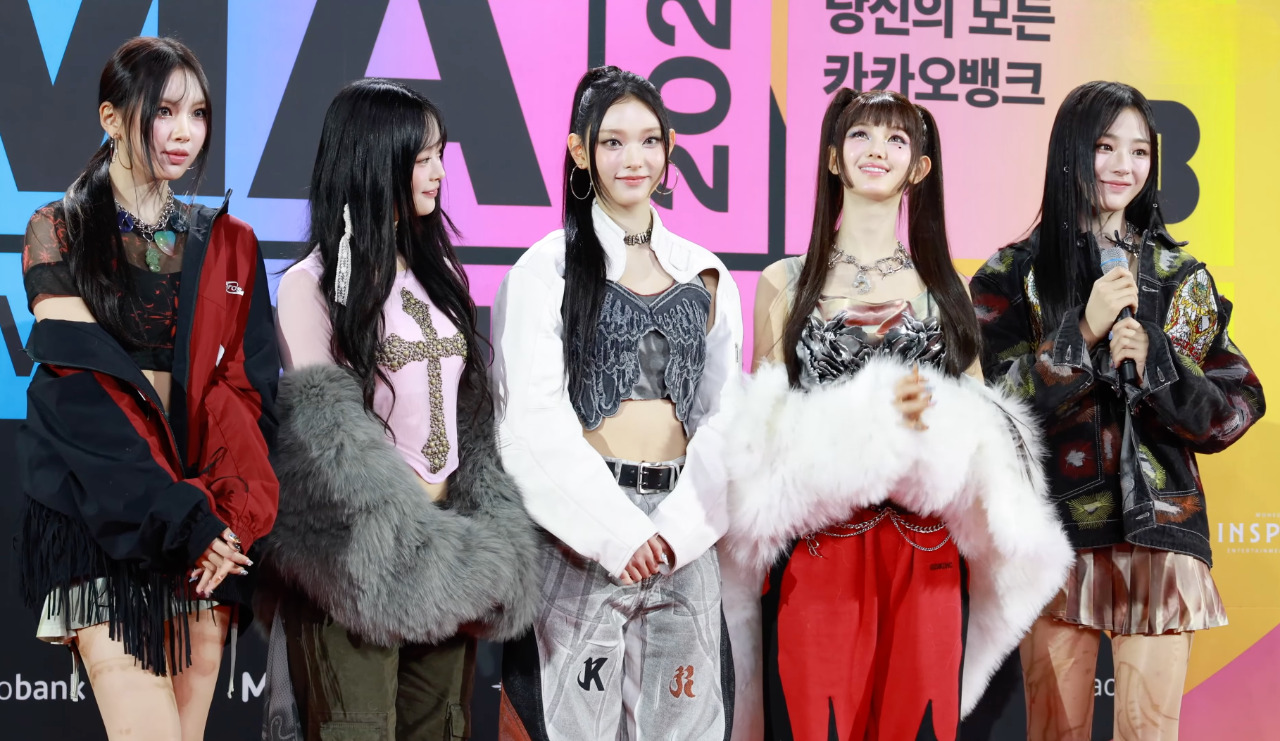
- NewJeans at the 2023 Melon Music Awards
Awards and nominations
Award	Wins	Nominations
Asia Artist Awards	11	14
Asian Pop Music Awards	4	6
Billboard Music Awards	1	5
Billboard Women in Music	1	1
Circle Chart Music Awards	5	7
Clio Music Awards	1	1
Edaily Culture Awards	1	1
Esports Awards	1	1
The Fact Music Awards	8	14
Genie Music Awards	0	1
Golden Disc Awards	2	6
Hanteo Music Awards	3	13
iHeartRadio Music Awards	1	2
Japan Gold Disc Awards	2	2
Japan Record Awards	3	5
The K-Billboard Awards	1	1
K-Global Heart Dream Awards	1	1
Korea Grand Music Awards	2	4
Korean Music Awards	6	11
MAMA Awards	5	19
Melon Music Awards	9	17
MTV Europe Music Awards	0	3
MTV Video Music Awards	0	3
MTV Video Music Awards Japan	1	1
Music Awards Japan	1	4
Nickelodeon Mexico Kids' Choice Awards	0	1
Seoul Music Awards	3	12
Seoul Tourism Awards	1	1
Spikes Asia Awards	2	2

Totals (Note: Certain award groups do not simply award one winner. They acknowledge several different recipients, have runners-up, and have third place. Since this is a specific recognition and is different from losing an award, runner-up mentions are considered wins in this award tally. For simplification and to avoid errors, each award in this list has been presumed to have had a prior nomination.)
- Wins: 78
- Nominations: 159

South Korean girl group NewJeans has received numerous accolades. Following their debut in 2022, the group won several rookie awards at the Golden Disc Awards, the Korean Music Awards, Melon Music Awards, and the Seoul Music Awards, among others. Their eponymous debut extended play won Best K-pop Album at the 20th Korean Music Awards, while their single "Attention" won a Digital Song Bonsang (Note: A bonsang (Korean: 본상), which translates to "main prize", is a major award given at a South Korean award ceremony.) at the 37th Golden Disc Awards, among others.

Following the commercial success of their 2023 releases, the single album OMG and the EP Get Up, NewJeans won several awards at most of the South Korean award ceremonies of the year. NewJeans became the first female artist to win Artist of the Year in the same year at both the 2023 MAMA Awards and 2023 Melon Music Awards, where they were also awarded Best Female Group and Song of the Year for their single "Ditto". The single also won the Digital Daesang at the 38th Golden Disc Awards and Song of the Year at the 8th Asia Artist Awards, where NewJeans were awarded Singer of the Year. Their single "OMG" won the Best Song Award at the 33rd Seoul Music Awards. In Japan, NewJeans became the first foreign artist in history to win the Excellent Work Award and be nominated for the Grand Prix with "Ditto" at the Japan Record Awards. In the United States, NewJeans won Top Global K-Pop Artist at the 2023 Billboard Music Awards.

== Awards and nominations ==
Name of the award ceremony, year presented, category, nominee of the award, and the result of the nomination
Award ceremony	Year (Note: It indicates the year in which the ceremony took place.)	Category	Nominee / Work	Result	Ref.
Asia Artist Awards	2022	Performance of the Year (Daesang)	NewJeans	Won	
Asia Artist Awards	2022	Rookie of the Year – Music	NewJeans	Won	
Asia Artist Awards	2022	DCM Popularity Award – Female Singer	NewJeans	Nominated	
Asia Artist Awards	2022	Idolplus Popularity Award – Music	NewJeans	Nominated	
Asia Artist Awards	2023	Asia Celebrity Award	NewJeans	Won	
Asia Artist Awards	2023	Best Choice Award	NewJeans	Won	
Asia Artist Awards	2023	Fabulous Award	NewJeans	Won	
Asia Artist Awards	2023	Hot Trend Award	NewJeans	Won	
Asia Artist Awards	2023	Singer of the Year (Daesang)	NewJeans	Won	
Asia Artist Awards	2023	Song of the Year (Daesang)	"Ditto"	Won	
Asia Artist Awards	2023	Popularity Award – Singer (Female)	NewJeans	Nominated	
Asia Artist Awards	2024	Artist of the Year – Music (Daesang)	NewJeans	Won	
Asia Artist Awards	2024	Best Artist Award – Music	NewJeans	Won	
Asia Artist Awards	2024	Best Performance	"How Sweet"	Won	
Asian Pop Music Awards	2022	Top 20 Songs of the Year (Overseas)	"Hype Boy"	Won	
Asian Pop Music Awards	2022	Best New Artist (Overseas)	New Jeans	Nominated	
Asian Pop Music Awards	2023	Best Group (Overseas)	NewJeans	Won	
Asian Pop Music Awards	2023	Top 20 Albums of the Year (Overseas)	Get Up	Won	
Asian Pop Music Awards	2023	Top 20 Songs of the Year (Overseas)	"Super Shy"	Won	
Asian Pop Music Awards	2023	Song of the Year (Overseas)	"Super Shy"	Nominated	
Billboard Music Awards	2023	Top Global K-Pop Artist	NewJeans	Won	
Billboard Music Awards	2023	Top Billboard Global (Excl. U.S.) Artist	NewJeans	Nominated	
Billboard Music Awards	2023	Top Global K-Pop Album	Get Up	Nominated	
Billboard Music Awards	2023	Top Global K-Pop Song	"Ditto"	Nominated	
Billboard Music Awards	2023	Top Global K-Pop Song	"OMG"	Nominated	
Billboard Women in Music	2024	Group of the Year	NewJeans	Won	
Circle Chart Music Awards	2023	New Artist of the Year – Digital	"Attention"	Won	
Circle Chart Music Awards	2023	Artist of the Year – Global Digital Music (August)	"Attention"	Nominated	
Circle Chart Music Awards	2023	Artist of the Year – Global Digital Music (August)	"Hype Boy"	Nominated	
Circle Chart Music Awards	2023	New Artist of the Year – Physical	New Jeans	Nominated	
Circle Chart Music Awards	2024	Artist of the Year – Digital	"Ditto"	Won	
Circle Chart Music Awards	2024	Artist of the Year – Global Streaming	"Super Shy"	Won	
Circle Chart Music Awards	2024	Artist of the Year – Streaming Unique Listeners	"Ditto"	Won	
Circle Chart Music Awards	2024	Music Steady Seller of the Year	"Hype Boy"	Won	
Clio Music Awards	2024	Music Videos	"Ditto"	Shortlisted	
Edaily Culture Awards (Note: The Edaily Culture Awards are a South Korean award ceremony established in 2013 to honor the year's best achievements in six categories: theatre, classical, dance, Korean music, musicals and concerts. Winners are selected by a panel of 54 judges who are professionals in each field.)	2024	Frontier Award	NewJeans	Won	
Esports Awards	2024	Content of the Year	"Gods"	Won	
The Fact Music Awards	2022	Next Leader Award	NewJeans	Won	
The Fact Music Awards	2022	Fan N Star Choice Award (Artist)	NewJeans	Nominated	
The Fact Music Awards	2022	Four Star Awards	NewJeans	Nominated	
The Fact Music Awards	2022	Idolplus Popularity Award	NewJeans	Nominated	
The Fact Music Awards	2023	Artist of the Year (Bonsang)	NewJeans	Won	
The Fact Music Awards	2023	Listener's Choice Award	NewJeans	Won	
The Fact Music Awards	2023	Best Music – Spring	"OMG"	Nominated	
The Fact Music Awards	2023	Best Music – Fall	"Super Shy"	Nominated	
The Fact Music Awards	2023	Idolplus Popularity Award	NewJeans	Nominated	
The Fact Music Awards	2024	Artist of the Year (Bonsang)	NewJeans	Won	
The Fact Music Awards	2024	Musinsa Popularity Award	NewJeans	Won	
The Fact Music Awards	2024	TMA Popularity Award	NewJeans	Won	
The Fact Music Awards	2024	World Best Performer Award	NewJeans	Won	
The Fact Music Awards	2024	Worldwide Icon Award	NewJeans	Won	
Genie Music Awards	2022	Best Female Rookie Award	NewJeans	Nominated	
Golden Disc Awards	2023	Digital Song Bonsang	"Attention"	Won	
Golden Disc Awards	2023	Rookie Artist of the Year	NewJeans	Won	
Golden Disc Awards	2023	TikTok Most Popular Artist Award	NewJeans	Nominated	
Golden Disc Awards	2023	Digital Daesang	"Attention"	Nominated	
Golden Disc Awards	2024	Digital Daesang	"Ditto"	Won	
Golden Disc Awards	2024	Digital Song Bonsang	"Ditto"	Won	
Hanteo Music Awards	2023	Rookie of the Year	NewJeans	Won	
Hanteo Music Awards	2023	Main Award (Bonsang)	NewJeans	Nominated	
Hanteo Music Awards	2023	WhosFandom Award	NewJeans	Nominated	
Hanteo Music Awards	2024	Artist of the Year (Bonsang)	NewJeans	Won	
Hanteo Music Awards	2024	WhosFandom Award	NewJeans	Nominated	
Hanteo Music Awards	2025	Artist of the Year (Bonsang)	NewJeans	Won	
Hanteo Music Awards	2025	Global Artist – Africa	NewJeans	Nominated	
Hanteo Music Awards	2025	Global Artist – Asia	NewJeans	Nominated	
Hanteo Music Awards	2025	Global Artist – Europe	NewJeans	Nominated	
Hanteo Music Awards	2025	Global Artist – North America	NewJeans	Nominated	
Hanteo Music Awards	2025	Global Artist – Oceania	NewJeans	Nominated	
Hanteo Music Awards	2025	Global Artist – South America	NewJeans	Nominated	
Hanteo Music Awards	2025	WhosFandom Award – Female	NewJeans	Nominated	
iHeartRadio Music Awards	2024	Best New K-pop Artist	NewJeans	Won	
iHeartRadio Music Awards	2024	K-pop Song of the Year	"Super Shy"	Nominated	
Japan Gold Disc Awards	2024	Best 3 New Artists – Asia	NewJeans	Won	
Japan Gold Disc Awards	2024	Song of the Year by Streaming – Asia	"OMG"	Won	
Japan Record Awards	2023	Excellent Work Award (Songs of the Year)	"Ditto"	Won	
Japan Record Awards	2023	Special Achievement Award	NewJeans	Won	
Japan Record Awards	2023	Grand Prix	"Ditto"	Nominated	
Japan Record Awards	2024	Excellent Work Award (Songs of the Year)	"Supernatural"	Won	
Japan Record Awards	2024	Grand Prix	"Supernatural"	Nominated	
The K-Billboard Awards	2022	Hot Rookie Award	NewJeans	Won	
K-Global Heart Dream Awards	2023	K-Global Best Music Award	NewJeans	Won	
Korea Grand Music Awards	2024	Grand Artist (Daesang)	NewJeans	Won	
Korea Grand Music Awards	2024	Best Artist	NewJeans	Won	
Korea Grand Music Awards	2024	Best Song	"Super Shy"	Nominated	
Korea Grand Music Awards	2024	Trend of the Year – K-pop Group	NewJeans	Nominated	
Korean Music Awards	2023	Best K-pop Album	New Jeans	Won	
Korean Music Awards	2023	Best K-pop Song	"Attention"	Won	
Korean Music Awards	2023	Rookie of the Year	NewJeans	Won	
Korean Music Awards	2023	Album of the Year	New Jeans	Nominated	
Korean Music Awards	2023	Musician of the Year	NewJeans	Nominated	
Korean Music Awards	2023	Song of the Year	"Attention"	Nominated	
Korean Music Awards	2024	Best K-pop Album	Get Up	Won	
Korean Music Awards	2024	Best K-pop Song	"Ditto"	Won	
Korean Music Awards	2024	Song of the Year	"Ditto"	Won	
Korean Music Awards	2024	Album of the Year	Get Up	Nominated	
Korean Music Awards	2024	Musician of the Year	NewJeans	Nominated	
MAMA Awards	2022	Artist of the Year	NewJeans	Nominated	
MAMA Awards	2022	Best Dance Performance Female Group	"Attention"	Nominated	
MAMA Awards	2022	Best New Female Artist	NewJeans	Nominated	
MAMA Awards	2022	Song of the Year	"Attention"	Nominated	
MAMA Awards	2022	Worldwide Fans' Choice Top 10	NewJeans	Nominated	
MAMA Awards	2023	Artist of the Year	NewJeans	Won	
MAMA Awards	2023	Best Dance Performance Female Group	"Ditto"	Won	
MAMA Awards	2023	Best Female Group	NewJeans	Won	
MAMA Awards	2023	Song of the Year	"Ditto"	Won	
MAMA Awards	2023	Album of the Year	Get Up	Nominated	
MAMA Awards	2023	Worldwide Fans' Choice Top 10	NewJeans	Nominated	
MAMA Awards	2024	Fans' Choice Female	NewJeans	Won	
MAMA Awards	2024	Artist of the Year	NewJeans	Nominated	
MAMA Awards	2024	Best Choreography	"Supernatural"	Nominated	
MAMA Awards	2024	Best Dance Performance – Female Group	"How Sweet"	Nominated	
MAMA Awards	2024	Best Female Group	NewJeans	Nominated	
MAMA Awards	2024	Fans' Choice of the Year	NewJeans	Nominated	
MAMA Awards	2024	Song of the Year	"How Sweet"	Nominated	
MAMA Awards	2024	Song of the Year	"Supernatural"	Nominated	
Melon Music Awards	2022	Best New Artist	NewJeans	Won	
Melon Music Awards	2022	Top 10 Artist	NewJeans	Won	
Melon Music Awards	2022	Album of the Year	New Jeans	Nominated	
Melon Music Awards	2022	Artist of the Year	NewJeans	Nominated	
Melon Music Awards	2022	Best Female Group	NewJeans	Nominated	
Melon Music Awards	2023	Artist of the Year	NewJeans	Won	
Melon Music Awards	2023	Best Female Group	NewJeans	Won	
Melon Music Awards	2023	Millions Top 10 Artist	Get Up	Won	
Melon Music Awards	2023	Song of the Year	"Ditto"	Won	
Melon Music Awards	2023	Top 10 Artist	NewJeans	Won	
Melon Music Awards	2023	Album of the Year	Get Up	Nominated	
Melon Music Awards	2023	Kakao Favorite Star Award	NewJeans	Nominated	
Melon Music Awards	2024	Millions Top 10 Artist	NewJeans	Won	
Melon Music Awards	2024	Top 10 Artist	NewJeans	Won	
Melon Music Awards	2024	Artist of the Year	NewJeans	Nominated	
Melon Music Awards	2024	Best Female Group	NewJeans	Nominated	
Melon Music Awards	2024	Kakao Bank Everyone's Star	NewJeans	Nominated	
MTV Europe Music Awards	2023	Best Group	NewJeans	Nominated	
MTV Europe Music Awards	2023	Best K-Pop	NewJeans	Nominated	
MTV Europe Music Awards	2024	Best K-Pop	NewJeans	Nominated	
MTV Video Music Awards	2023	Group of the Year	NewJeans	Nominated	
MTV Video Music Awards	2024	Best Group	NewJeans	Nominated	
MTV Video Music Awards	2024	Best K-Pop	"Super Shy"	Nominated	
MTV Video Music Awards Japan	2023	Best Buzz Award	NewJeans	Won	
Music Awards Japan	2025	Best K-pop Song in Japan	"Ditto"	Won	
Music Awards Japan	2025	Best K-pop Song in Japan	"Supernatural"	Nominated	
Music Awards Japan	2025	Best of Listeners' Choice: International Song	"Supernatural"	Nominated	
Music Awards Japan	2025	Best of Listeners' Choice: International Song	"How Sweet"	Nominated	
Nickelodeon Mexico Kids' Choice Awards	2023	Favorite K-Pop Group	NewJeans	Nominated	
Seoul Music Awards	2023	Rookie of the Year	NewJeans	Won	
Seoul Music Awards	2023	Hallyu Special Award	NewJeans	Nominated	
Seoul Music Awards	2023	Popularity Award	NewJeans	Nominated	
Seoul Music Awards	2024	Bonsang Award	NewJeans	Won	
Seoul Music Awards	2024	Daesang Award	NewJeans	Nominated	
Seoul Music Awards	2024	Best Song Award	"OMG"	Won	
Seoul Music Awards	2024	Hallyu Special Award	NewJeans	Nominated	
Seoul Music Awards	2024	Popularity Award	NewJeans	Nominated	
Seoul Music Awards	2025	Main Prize (Bonsang)	NewJeans	Nominated	
Seoul Music Awards	2025	Popularity Award	NewJeans	Nominated	
Seoul Music Awards	2025	K-Wave Special Award	NewJeans	Nominated	
Seoul Music Awards	2025	K-pop World Choice – Group	NewJeans	Nominated	
Seoul Tourism Awards	2023	Hallyu Star Award	NewJeans	Won	
Spikes Asia Awards	2024	Brand or Product Integration into Music Content	"ETA"	Bronze	
Spikes Asia Awards	2024	Brand or Product Integration into Music Content	"Zero"	Shortlisted	

== Other accolades ==
=== State honors ===
Name of country, year given, and name of honor
Country	Year	Honor	Ref.
South Korea	2023	Minister of Culture, Sports and Tourism Commendation (Note: Honors are given at the Korean Popular Culture and Arts Awards, arranged by the Korea Creative Content Agency and hosted by the Ministry of Culture, Sports and Tourism. They are awarded to those who have contributed to the arts and South Korea's pop culture.)	

=== Listicles ===
Name of publisher, year listed, name of listicle, and placement
Publisher	Year	Listicle	Placement	Ref.
Billboard	2024	21 Under 21	Placed	
Billboard	2025	21 Under 21	Placed	
The Business of Fashion	2023	BoF 500 (Note: The BoF 500 is an annual list of figures leading the global fashion industry.)	Placed	
Forbes	2023	Korea Power Celebrity 40	27th	
Forbes	2024	Korea Power Celebrity 40	3rd	
Forbes	2023	30 Under 30 – Asia (Entertainment & Sports)	Placed	
Forbes Korea	2025	K-Idol of the Year 30	10th	
Gold House	2023	A100 List (Note: The A100 List honors the most impactful Asians and Asian American & Pacific Islanders (AAPIs) in various sectors every May for AAPI Heritage Month.)	Placed	
Time	2023	Next Generation Leaders	Placed	
Variety	2024	Young Hollywood Impact Report	Placed	

=== World records ===
Name of publication, year the record was awarded, name of the record, and the name of the record holder
Publication	Year	World record	Record holder	Ref.
Guinness World Records	2023	Fastest K-pop act to reach 1 billion streams on Spotify	NewJeans	
