= NewJeans Code in Busan =

2022 South Korean travel reality television series

- Promotional poster
- Hangul: 뉴진스 코드
- RR: Nyujinseu kodeu
- MR: Nyujinsŭ k'odŭ
- Genre: Travel; reality
- Developed by: Kim Na-young; Kim Ga-young; Kim Young-sook; Kim Mi-sun, Hwang Hye-jeong; Jung Eun-hye; Yoon So-ra
- Directed by: Yoo Gyeong-seok; Eom Jin-yong; Kim Na-yeon; Han Seon-woo
- Starring: NewJeans
- Country of origin: South Korea
- Original language: Korean
- No. of episodes: 3

Production
- Executive producer: Seong Ki-hun
- Production companies: Busan Metropolitan City; Busan Tourism Organization

Original release
- Network: SBS TV
- Release: October 16 – November 6, 2022

NewJeans Code in Busan (Korean: 뉴진스 코드) is a South Korean travel reality television series produced by Busan Metropolitan City and the Busan Tourism Organization and distributed by SBS. Starring K-pop girl group NewJeans, the three-episode series follows the group as they visit several of Busan's landmarks over the course of a two-day trip. It was created as part of a series of Hallyu content produced to support Busan's bid to host the Expo 2030.

The project was first announced in September 2022 and premiered on SBS TV on October 16, 2022, at 12:10 (KST). Set to be aired for three consecutive Sundays, the final episode was postponed to November 6, 2022. The series was released for streaming on Wavve, where it recorded 23.8 million hours of viewing in two months. After the broadcast, several filming locations were crowded with fans, which led the Busan Tourism Organization to create two travel guides based on the series.

== Production ==
On September 16, 2022, South Korean television network SBS announced the production of the travel reality television series NewJeans Code in Busan, starring K-pop girl group NewJeans. Produced by Busan Metropolitan City and the Busan Tourism Organization, the documentary is part of a series of Hallyu content sponsored by the city of Busan, the Busan Tourism Organization and the Busan Film Commission to showcase the city and support its bid to host the Expo 2030. It is the second collaboration between Busan and Hybe Corporation, the parent company of NewJeans' label ADOR, after BTS' Yet to Come concert held in the city on October 15, 2022.

Shot on the 26th and the 27th of September 2022, the series follows NewJeans as they explore Busan and learn more about it through QR codes over the course of a two-day trip. The group visited Songdo Sky Park, Bupyeong Kkangtong Market, Taejongdae and Dadaepo Beach. Other Busan's sites, such as the Dadaepo Sunset Fountain of Dreams, Skyline Luge Busan, Jeonpogonggu-gil, Cheongsapo, Gwangalli Beach and Yeongdo Marine Adventure Park, were featured in the background. Regarding the project, Busan Mayor Park Heong-joon said:

"The collaboration between world-famous K-pop artists and Busan is a great force in raising Busan tourism brand awareness and revitalizing the tourism market that was stagnant due to COVID-19, [...] I hope that the happy travel content in Busan, that we can see, laugh, and enjoy together, will serve as an opportunity to inform the world of Busan, where we want to live even if we are reborn"

== Release and marketing ==
A video teaser was released on October 7, 2022. The series premiered on SBS TV at 12:10 (KST) on October 16, 2022, and was set to be aired for three consecutive Sundays. However, the final episode was postponed to respect the national mourning period announced after the Seoul Halloween crowd crush. It was aired on November 6, 2022. The series was released for streaming on Wavve.

Several promotional videos showing behind-the-scenes and clips of the series were released by the Busan Tourism Organization on YouTube and TikTok. On October 21, 2022, the Busan Tourism Organization announced they would create an itinerary based on the series. From October 21 to 30, 2022, they held a "mission tour event", where each participant had to follow the itinerary and scan the QR codes found at every location to complete the missions and win a prize.

== Episodes ==
No.	Title	Original release date
1	"See You in Busan with NewJeans!"; Transliteration: "'Nyujinseuwa Busan-eseo Mannayo!'" (Korean: '뉴진스와 부산에서 만나요!')	October 16, 2022
2	"Full-scale Trip to Busan with NewJeans★"; Transliteration: "Nyujinseuwa Hamkke Haneun Bongyeog Busan Yeohaeng★" (Korean: 뉴진스와 함께 하는 본격 부산 여행★)	October 23, 2022
3	"From Food to Experience! NewJeans' Trip to Busan"; Transliteration: "Meogbangbuteo Cheheomkkaji! Nyujinseuui Busan Yeohaeng" (Korean: 먹방부터 체험까지! 뉴진스의 부산 여행)	November 6, 2022

== Impact ==
The series recorded 23.8 million hours of viewing in two months on Wavve. Promotional videos related to it recorded a total of 5 million views on YouTube, while its TikTok hashtag exceeded 13.2 million views. On October 26, 2022, journalist Yoo Ji-hye of Sports Dong-a reported that multiple filming locations, including Songdo Sky Park, Yeongdo Marine Adventure Park, Jeonpogonggu-gil, Cheongsapo Port, Dadaepo Sunset Fountain of Dreams and several of the shops where the members bought food, were crowded with fans completing missions and scanning QR codes. It was reported that interest in Jeonpogonggu-gil, Dadaepo Sunset Fountain of Dreams, and Myeongji-dong's grilled sea cucumbers had risen thanks to the series. The Busan Tourism Organization then decided to create two official travel guides based on it. An official representative of the city said that "it has stimulated viewers' desire to travel by introducing a fresh concept of traveling through information obtained using QR codes and a travel course".
