= Hanni (singer) =

Australian singer (born 2004)

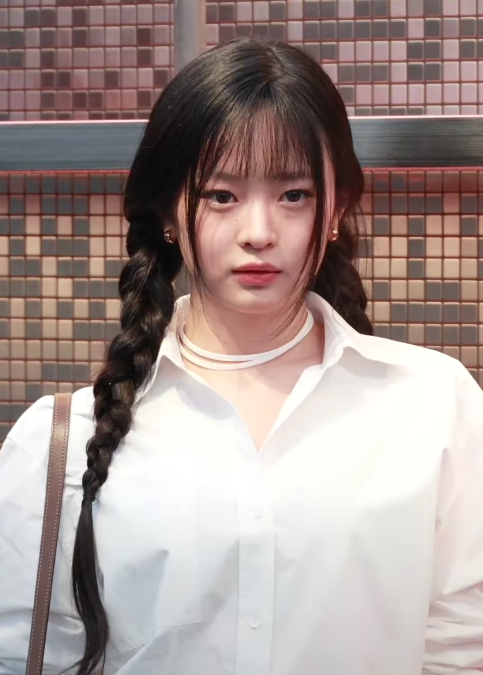
- Hanni in 2024
- Born: Hanni Pham; 6 October 2004 (age 22); Melbourne, Victoria, Australia
- Other name: Phạm Ngọc Hân
- Occupation: Singer
- Musical career
- Genre: K-pop
- Instrument: Vocals
- Years active: 2022–present
- Label: ADOR
- Member of: NewJeans

Korean name
- Hangul: 하니
- RR: Hani
- MR: Hani

Signature
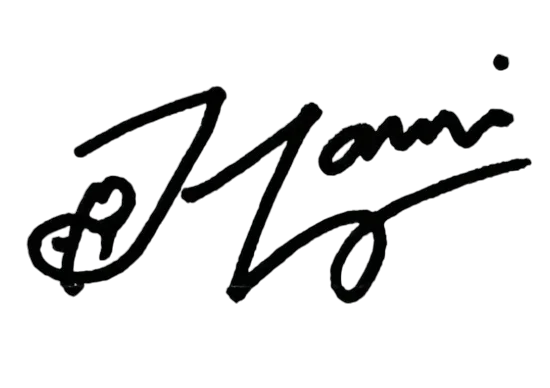

Hanni Pham (Note: Korean: 하니 팜, romanized: Hani Pam; IPA: [ha̠ni pʰa̠m]; Vietnamese: Phạm Ngọc Hân; IPA: [faːm˧˨ʔ ŋawk͡p̚˧˨ʔ hən˧˧]) (born 6 October 2004) is an Australian singer based in South Korea. In July 2022, she made her debut as a member of the South Korean girl group NewJeans, under the record label ADOR.

== Early life ==
Hanni Pham, whose Vietnamese name is Phạm Ngọc Hân, was born on 6 October 2004, in Melbourne, Australia to Vietnamese parents. Her father is from Hanoi, and her mother is from Ho Chi Minh City.

== Career ==
=== 2019–2021: Pre-debut activities ===
In 2019, she began performing in her hometown as a member of the Aemina Dance Crew, who specialized in covering the choreography of K-pop groups. She moved to Seoul to start her trainee period without knowing how to speak the Korean language. In July 2021, she made a cameo appearance in BTS' music video for "Permission to Dance", alongside group member Minji.

=== 2022–present: Debut with NewJeans and dispute with labels ===
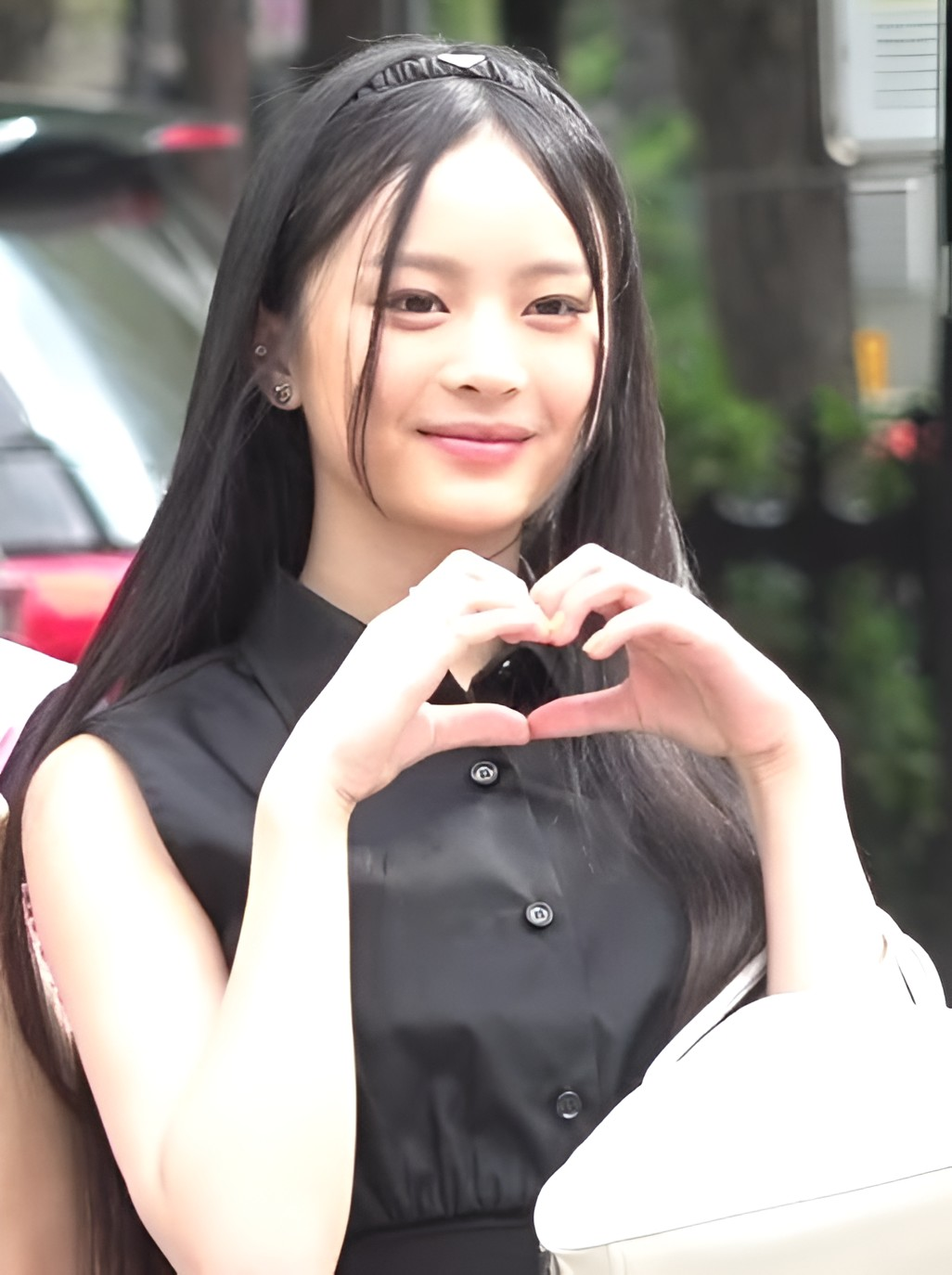
Hanni in 2022

On 1 July 2022, ADOR teased the launch of their first girl group, NewJeans, by posting three animated videos of the numbers "22", "7" and "22" on their social media accounts, fueling speculation that content would be released on 22 July. Hanni debuted as a member of the group with the surprise-released single "Attention" on 22 July 2022, without any prior promotion or information regarding the group's lineup. Since debuting, two songs released by NewJeans have featured lyrics written by Hanni: "Hype Boy" and "OMG".

==== Labour Committee testimony ====
On 15 October 2024, Hanni testified to the Labour Committee of South Korea's National Assembly regarding her experience with Hybe Corporation. The committee considered whether labour rights should be extended to contracted entertainers. Hanni recalled being ostracised by a different group's manager and other experiences of undermining, possibly as a result of strife between senior executives. Hanni and Ador CEO, Ju Young Kim, answered the committee's questions about bullying and dispute resolution. At the hearing, Hanni expressed gratitude for the assistance of the Australian Embassy and was concerned about her Korean language skills. The case was later dismissed by the government agency, with the rationale that K-pop group's members are not classified as workers and are not entitled to labour rights.

==== Return to ADOR ====
On 29 December 2025, it was announced that an agreement had been reached for Hanni to return to ADOR.

== Other activities ==
=== Endorsements ===
In October 2022, Gucci announced that they had signed on Hanni as one of its brand ambassadors. In 2023, she first appeared in a campaign for the Gucci Horsebit 1955 bag alongside Halle Bailey and Julia Garner, before being chosen as the sole model for its global campaign, developed by Gucci's creative director Sabato de Sarno, the following year. In February 2023, Hanni became a global ambassador for Armani Beauty. She was featured in two campaigns for the brand's Power Fabric+ Foundation and Lip Maestro Satin lipstick. That same month, Gucci named Hanni a global ambassador. The following year, she became a global ambassador for Gucci Beauty.

In August 2023, Hanni appeared on the cover of Elle's D Edition, presented in collaboration with Chaumet. In February 2024, she appeared on the cover of W Korea, shot by Hiroshi Fujiwara. She collaborated again with Chaumet in March 2024 for the cover of Marie Claire Korea's digital issue. That same month, Hanni became a global ambassador for UGG.

== Discography ==
=== Songwriting credits ===
All credits are adapted from the Korea Music Copyright Association, unless cited otherwise.

List of songs, showing year of release, artist's name and album name
Year	Artist	Song	Album	Lyricist	
Year	Artist	Song	Album	Credited	With
2022	NewJeans	"Hype Boy"	New Jeans	Yes	Gigi, Ylva Dimberg & 250
2023	NewJeans	"OMG"	OMG	Yes	Gigi, Ylva Dimberg & Park Jin-su

== Videography ==
=== Music video appearances ===
Year	Title	Artist	Ref.
2021	"Permission to Dance"	BTS	

== Filmography ==
=== Hosting ===
Year	Title	Notes	Ref.
2024	Korea Grand Music Awards	with Winter and Nam Ji-hyun	
