= NewJeans =

South Korean girl group

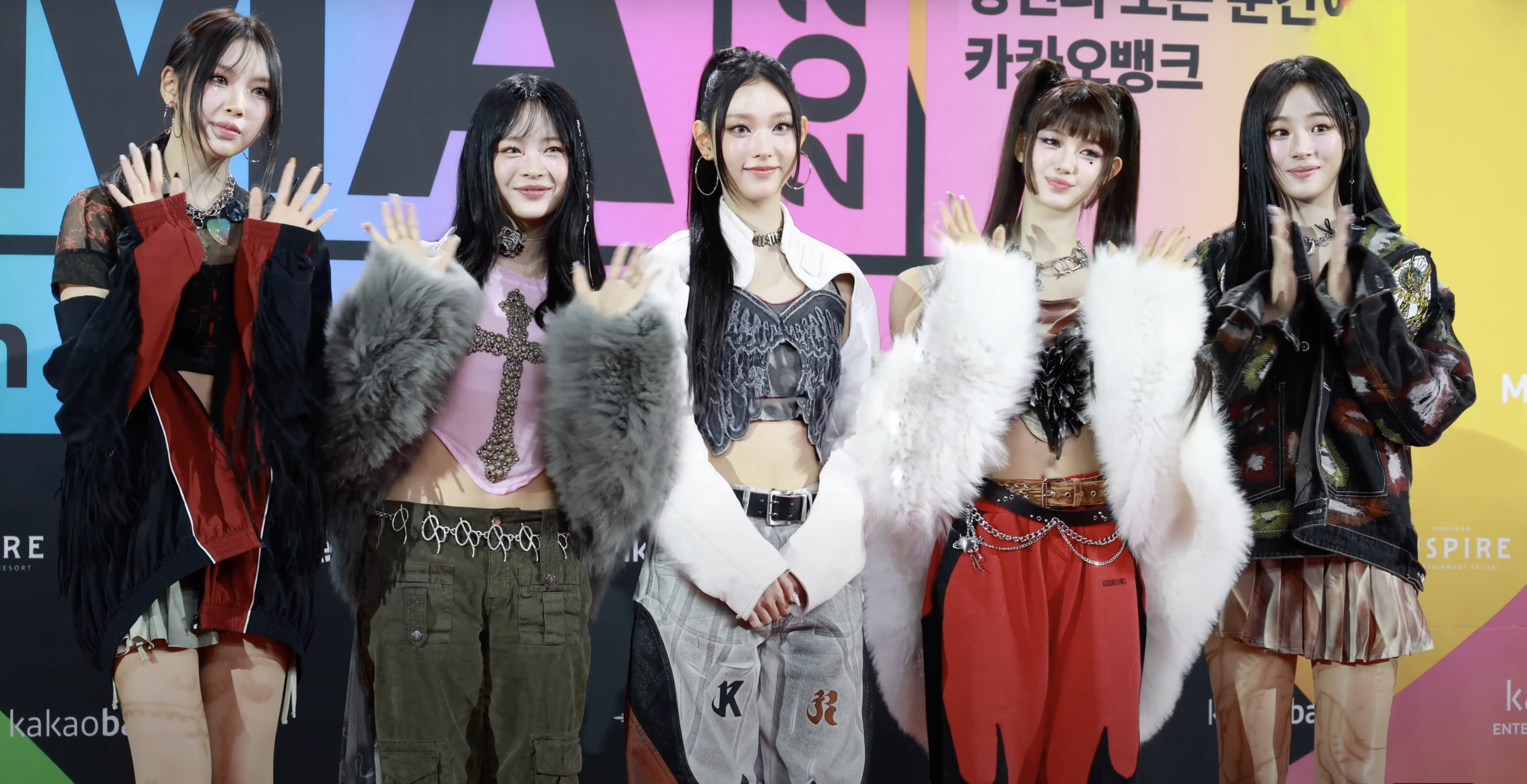
- NewJeans at the 2023 Melon Music Awards; L–R: Hyein, Hanni, Haerin, Danielle, and Minji

Background information
- Origin: Seoul, South Korea
- Genres: K-pop; pop; R&B
- Works: Discography; videography
- Years active: 2022–present
- Labels: ADOR; Geffen
- Awards: Full list
- Members: Minji; Hanni; Haerin; Hyein
- Past members: Danielle
- Website: newjeans.kr

Korean name
- Hangul: 뉴진스
- RR: Nyujinseu
- MR: Nyujinsŭ

NewJeans (Korean: 뉴진스) is a South Korean girl group formed by ADOR, a sub-label of Hybe. The group consists of Minji, Hanni, Haerin, and Hyein. NewJeans was originally a quintet; Danielle was removed from the group and had her contract terminated in 2025 due to alleged violations. Formerly produced by Min Hee-jin, they are known for their girl next door image and musical stylings reminiscent of the 1990s and 2000s.

The group released their first single "Attention" on July 22, 2022. It was followed shortly afterwards by two other singles, "Hype Boy" and "Cookie", with "Hype Boy" becoming the longest-running song on the Billboard Global 200 by a K-pop female act. The singles were all featured on their eponymous debut extended play (EP), released in August 2022. In January 2023, they released their first single album, OMG, to commercial success. It was accompanied by two singles, "Ditto" and "OMG". "Ditto" gained widespread popularity, becoming the longest-running number-one song on the Circle Digital Chart and the group's first entry on both the Billboard Hot 100 and the UK Singles Chart.

Their second EP, Get Up, peaked at number one on the US Billboard 200 and sold over one million copies in South Korea. Its lead single, "Super Shy", became the group's highest-charting single on the Billboard Global 200 (number two), the US Billboard Hot 100, and the UK Singles Chart. NewJeans has received rookie awards and was featured in listicles such as Time Next Generation Leaders and Forbes Korea Power Celebrity 40. IFPI named NewJeans the eighth best-selling artist worldwide in 2023.

In 2024, a dispute over NewJeans's management arose as former ADOR CEO Min Hee-jin and the members clashed with Hybe and ADOR executives. The members sought to terminate their contract, which ADOR denied. In March 2025, the Seoul Central District Court granted an injunction filed by ADOR, blocking the group from carrying out independent activities. The group subsequently announced a hiatus later that month. The court ruled in favor of ADOR on October 30, which resulted in Hyein and Haerin agreeing to return to the label. On December 29, it was announced that Hanni had also agreed to return, Minji was in talks, and Danielle's contract was terminated. As of May 7, 2026, discussions regarding Minji's contract are ongoing.

== Name ==
The group's name "NewJeans" alludes to the idea that jeans are a timeless fashion item and the group's intention to carve a timeless image for themselves. The name is also a word play on the phrase "new genes", referring to the group ushering a new generation of pop music.

In February 2025, the members changed their name to "NJZ" amid their contract dispute with Hybe. The group stopped using "NJZ" two months later, following an injunction.

== History ==
=== 2011–2022: Pre-debut activities and formation ===
Before debuting, several members of NewJeans had experience in entertainment. Danielle Marsh appeared regularly on tvN's Rainbow Kindergarten while living in South Korea. The variety show aired until 2011. She also appeared on the television programmes Jesse's Play Kitchen and My Heart's Crayon.

Hyein joined the children's group U.SSO Girl in November 2017 under the stage name U.Jeong. The group also featured Rora, who later debuted with Babymonster. She left U.SSO Girl in 2018. In December 2020, Hyein joined Play With Me Club, a music group and YouTube collective formed by PocketTV. She graduated from the group on May 3, 2021.

Vietnamese-Australian Hanni Pham was a member of the Aemina Dance Crew in Melbourne, where she performed dance covers of K-pop groups' choreography.

Hybe and Source Music began preparations for a new girl group in 2019, with Min Hee-jin appointed as its creative director. Min had joined Hybe that year as chief brand officer, having previously worked as a visual director at SM Entertainment, where she became known for her art direction. At the time of her appointment, it was announced that she would lead the creative direction of several girl groups, excluding those under Big Hit Entertainment. Hybe also planned to establish a separate label under her leadership, where she would work as a producer.

Global auditions for the group were held in September and October 2019. Minji, who was already a Source Music trainee, appeared in the audition promotional videos. Hanni was the only member eventually selected from the Plus Global Auditions. The other members joined Source Music through different routes. Danielle, a former YG Entertainment trainee, passed a separate Source Music audition in July 2020, while Haerin was recruited through street casting in late 2019 and joined the company in early 2020. Hanni and Minji also appeared in BTS's 2021 music video for "Permission to Dance". The members transferred to ADOR in late 2021, following the establishment of the label.

In November 2021, the project was moved to ADOR, Hybe's newly established independent label, following Min's appointment as its CEO. ADOR held a second round of global auditions between December 2021 and January 2022, and finalised the group's line-up in March 2022. Several media outlets referred to the group as "Min Hee-jin's Girl Group". The group's debut, initially planned for 2021, was postponed due to the COVID-19 pandemic.

=== 2022–2023: Debut with New Jeans, and OMG ===
NewJeans's official logo until 2026

On July 1, 2022, ADOR began teasing its new girl group with three animated videos featuring the numbers "22", "7" and "22", hinting at a July 22 debut. On July 22, NewJeans made their debut by surprise-releasing the music video for "Attention", without previously revealing the members or announcing the group's lineup. Billboard described the unconventional rollout as "risky-but-ultimately invigorating", attributing its success to "an emphasis on the music before anything else". Following the release, ADOR announced the group's self-titled debut EP, New Jeans, which featured four tracks, including two additional singles.

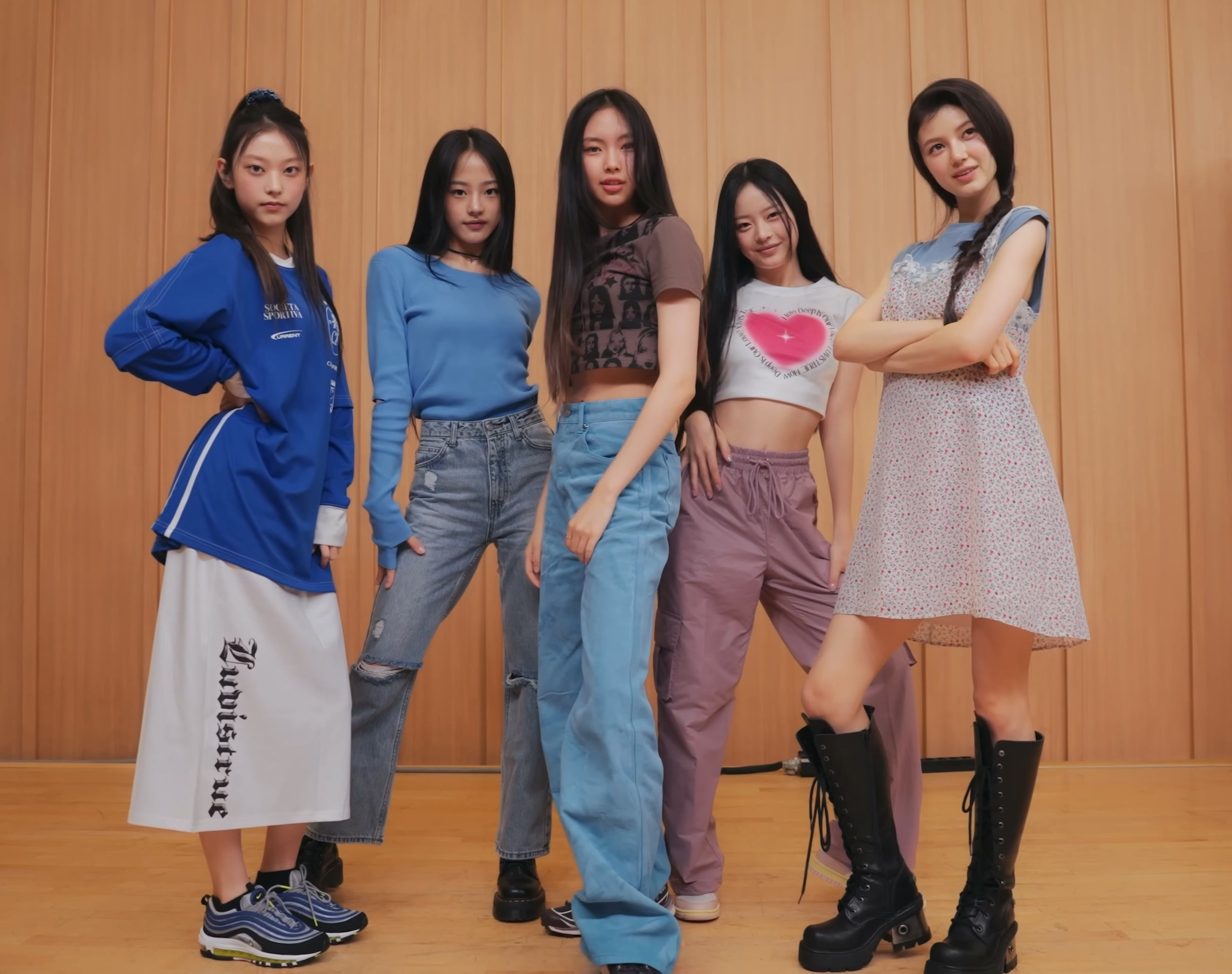
NewJeans in August 2022

On July 23, 2022, NewJeans released their second single, "Hype Boy", accompanied by a video introducing the members by name and four music videos presenting the song from different perspectives. The song peaked at number two on South Korea's Circle Digital Chart and spent 42 weeks on the Billboard Global 200, setting a record for the longest chart run by a K-pop female act at the time. The music video for the B-side "Hurt" followed on July 25.

Pre-orders for the group's debut EP, New Jeans, exceeded 444,000 copies within three days of becoming available. The EP became available for download and streaming on August 1, alongside its third single, "Cookie". Reviewing the release, Pitchfork described it as a polished collection drawing on R&B sounds from the 1990s and 2000s. "Cookie" also attracted criticism from some reviewers over perceived sexual innuendo in its lyrics. ADOR rejected these interpretations, explaining that the lyrics drew a comparison between burning CDs and baking cookies, concepts linked by the same verb in Korean.

The physical edition went on sale on August 8 and eventually sold more than one million copies. It was the first debut album by a K-pop female act to reach that milestone on the Circle Chart since the chart's establishment in 2011. NewJeans made their broadcast debut on Mnet's M Countdown on August 4, performing all three singles from the EP. In October, the group performed overseas for the first time at KCON events in Saudi Arabia and Japan. They also received rookie awards at six year-end ceremonies: the Melon Music Awards, Golden Disc Awards, Korean Music Awards, Seoul Music Awards, Asia Artist Awards and The Fact Music Awards.

NewJeans released "Ditto" on December 19, 2022, as the lead single from their first single album, OMG. The song spent thirteen weeks at number one on the Circle Digital Chart, setting a record for the longest-running chart-topper. It also marked the group's first appearances on the Billboard Hot 100 and the UK Singles Chart, peaking at numbers 82 and 95, respectively. Later that year, "Ditto" won Song of the Year at the MAMA Awards, the Melon Music Awards, the Golden Disc Awards and the Asia Artist Awards. The song also held the record for the longest-running Perfect all-kill, a distinction awarded to songs that top iChart's real-time, daily and weekly charts simultaneously. Its record of 655 hours stood until Huntrix's "Golden" surpassed it in 2025.

OMG followed on January 2, 2023. Critics highlighted its retro influences. The album debuted at number one on the Circle Album Chart and sold 700,000 copies in its first week. It became NewJeans' first million-selling release, followed shortly by their debut EP, New Jeans.

The album's title track, "OMG", gained popularity on TikTok and reached number 74 on the Billboard Hot 100. It later became the group's most-streamed song on Spotify. The song also won Best Song at the 33rd Seoul Music Awards.

=== 2023–2024: Get Up and Japanese debut ===
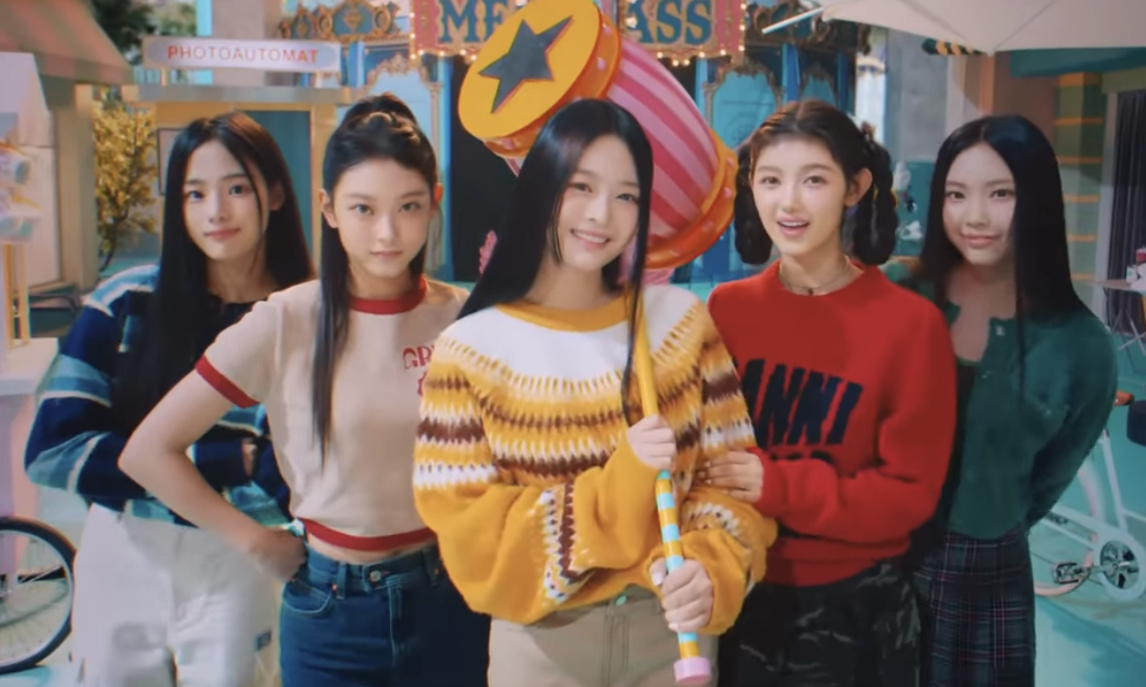
NewJeans in November 2022

In July 2023, NewJeans held their first sold-out fan meeting, titled Bunnies Camp, at the SK Olympic Handball Gymnasium in Seoul. Later that month, they released their second EP, Get Up. Released on July 21, the EP debuted at number one on the Billboard 200, making NewJeans the second K-pop girl group to top the chart after Blackpink. In South Korea, it peaked at number two on the Circle Album Chart and sold 1.65 million copies during its first week, becoming the group's third consecutive million-selling album. The EP was preceded by three singles: "Super Shy", "ETA", and "Cool with You". All three entered the Billboard Hot 100, making NewJeans the first K-pop female act to have three songs chart simultaneously. "Super Shy" also topped the Circle Digital Chart and became the group's highest-charting song in several international markets. Its success also helped the group reach number one on the Billboard Emerging Artists chart for the first time.

The group promoted Get Up through performances and appearances internationally, alongside collaborations with brands and celebrities. Their first live performance in the United States took place in August, when they became the first K-pop girl group to perform at Lollapalooza. They also appeared at Japan's Summer Sonic Festival later that month.

Alongside their other releases, NewJeans released several collaborative singles and soundtrack recordings throughout 2023. Their partnership with Coca-Cola produced two songs: "Zero", released in April, and "Be Who You Are (Real Magic)", released in May with Jon Batiste, J.I.D, and Camilo. A remix of "Zero" featuring J.I.D followed in June.

The group also contributed recordings to two television soundtracks. In September, they released "Beautiful Restriction" for the streaming series A Time Called You (2023), followed by "Our Night Is More Beautiful Than Your Day" for My Demon (2023–2024) in November. In October, NewJeans teamed up with Riot Games to record "Gods", the official theme song for the 2023 League of Legends World Championship.

In December, the group released NJWMX, their first remix album. It featured remixed tracks from New Jeans and OMG, with production by South Korean musicians 250 and FRNK. The group closed out the year with a performance on Dick Clark's New Year's Rockin' Eve, becoming the first K-pop girl group to appear on the programme.

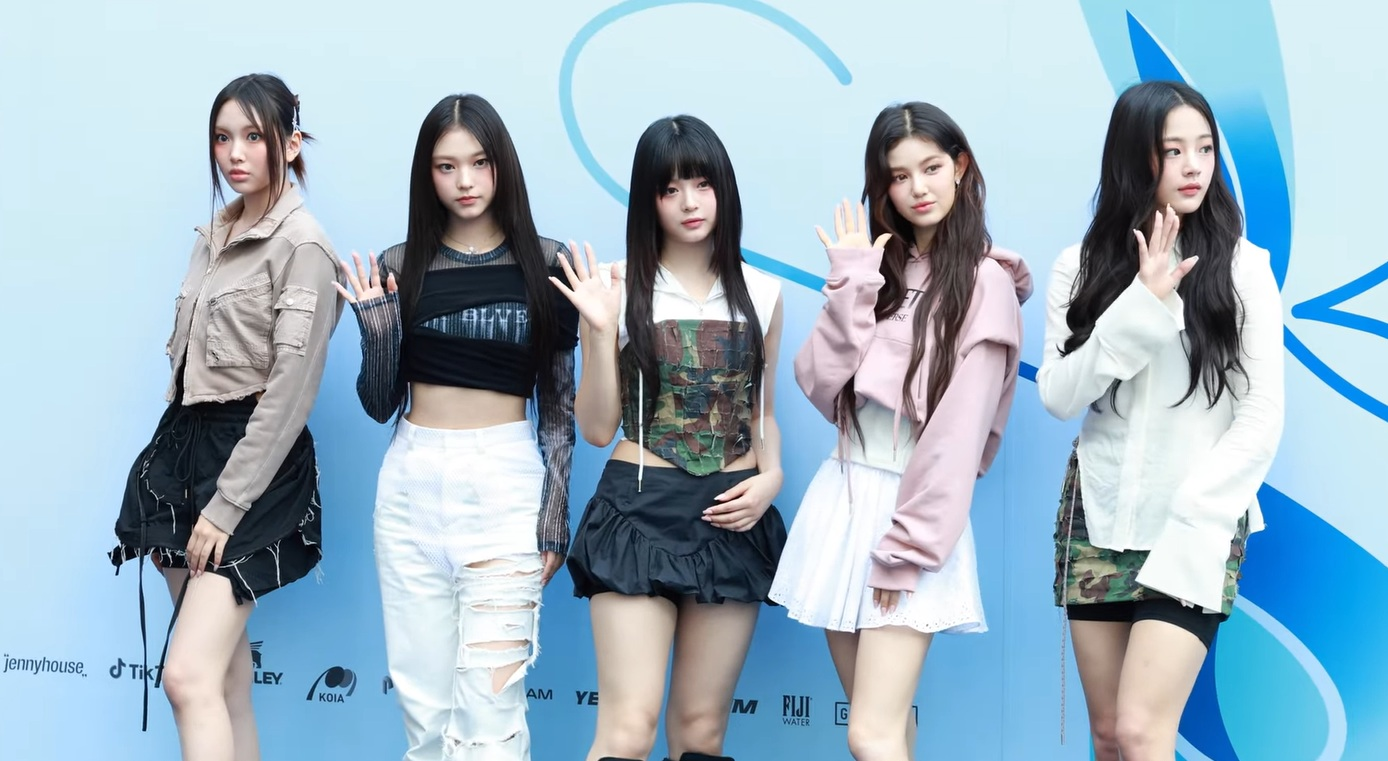
NewJeans in September 2023

NewJeans was among the most prominent music acts of 2023, with several publications highlighting the group's commercial performance and growing presence in the music, advertising, and fashion industries. Their commercial performance included 4.39 million album copies sold during the year, the highest annual total by a K-pop female act at the time. The group also set a Guinness World Record as the fastest K-pop act to accumulate one billion streams on Spotify. In the Global Recording Artist of the Year rankings published by the International Federation of the Phonographic Industry (IFPI), they placed eighth overall and were the second-highest-ranked female artist of the year.

Their domestic recognition extended beyond album sales and streaming figures. NewJeans tied with Lim Young-woong for first place in Gallup Korea's Singer of the Year poll. At the MAMA Awards, they received Artist of the Year, becoming the first girl group in twelve years to win the award, following 2NE1 in 2010 and Girls' Generation in 2011. They subsequently won the same award at the Melon Music Awards, making them the first female act to receive both honors in a single year.

The group's international recognition continued into 2024. At the Billboard Women in Music Awards, they received Group of the Year, becoming the first K-pop act to win the category. In Japan, "Ditto" received the Excellent Work Award and a nomination for the Grand Prix at the Japan Record Awards, making NewJeans the first foreign act to achieve both distinctions.

In March 2024, NewJeans announced plans to release two singles in May and June. The first, "How Sweet", was released on May 24, with "Bubble Gum" as its B-side. This was followed by "Supernatural" and "Right Now" on June 21. The releases marked NewJeans' official Japanese debut, which they promoted through several activities in the country, including their first Japanese fan meeting, Bunnies Camp 2024 Tokyo Dome, held at the Tokyo Dome on June 26 and 27.

The March announcement also included plans for an album release in the second half of 2024. However, the project was subsequently put on hold amid the dispute between HYBE and former ADOR CEO Min Hee-jin. Later that year, on November 16, the group received the Grand Artist Award at the inaugural Korea Grand Music Awards.

=== 2024–2026: Conflict with Hybe, hiatus, and Danielle's contract termination ===
In April 2024, tensions between Hybe Corporation's executives and Min Hee-jin, then CEO of NewJeans' label ADOR, escalated into a public dispute. Hybe executives alleged that Min had attempted to take control of the group, while Min accused the company of giving its other girl groups an unfair competitive advantage over NewJeans. On August 27, ADOR announced that Min would be replaced as its CEO.

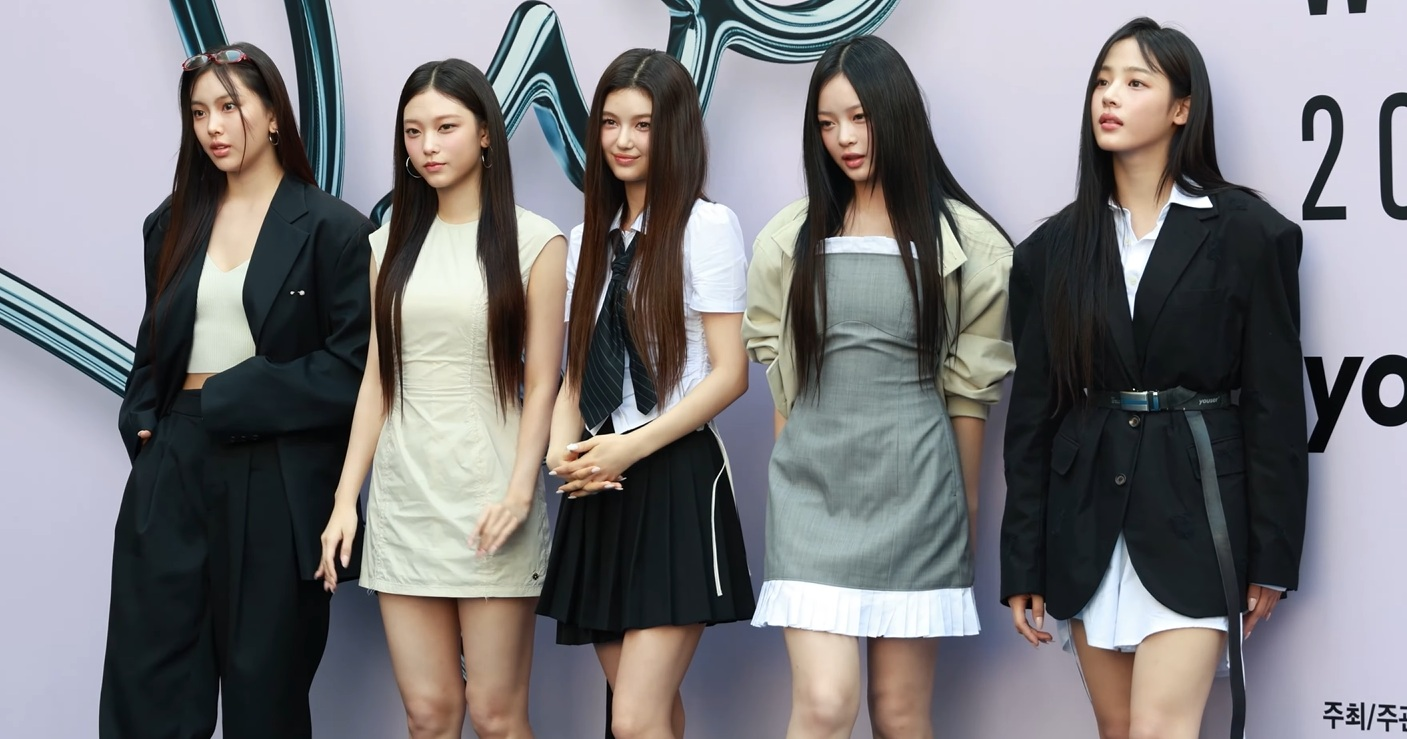
NewJeans in September 2024

The NewJeans members publicly backed Min during the dispute. On September 11, they held an unannounced YouTube livestream in which they criticised Hybe's management and raised concerns about workplace harassment, the leaking of private information and the removal of previously released content. At the end of the broadcast, they gave Hybe chairman Bang Si-hyuk until September 25 to reinstate Min as ADOR's CEO. Writing for The New York Times, Jon Caramanica described the dispute as a significant labour conflict in K-pop and one of the most high-profile in recent years.

On September 25, Hybe rejected the group's demand, citing its policy of separating management from production. The company nevertheless said Min could continue working as NewJeans' producer. In an interview with TV Asahi, Min said she remained committed to the group and intended to find a way forward amid the dispute. Min resigned as an internal director of ADOR in November, ending her formal association with Hybe.

On October 15, Hanni appeared before the National Assembly's Environment and Labor Committee as a reference witness during an audit examining workplace harassment and the protection of artists in the entertainment industry. She accused Hybe and its senior managers of mistreating NewJeans and spoke about what she described as discrimination against the group. ADOR CEO Kim Joo-young also appeared before the committee, pledging to cooperate with the investigation. In November, the labour ministry dismissed the workplace harassment complaint, ruling that K-pop group members did not qualify as employees under the Labour Standards Act and therefore were not covered by its workplace protections.

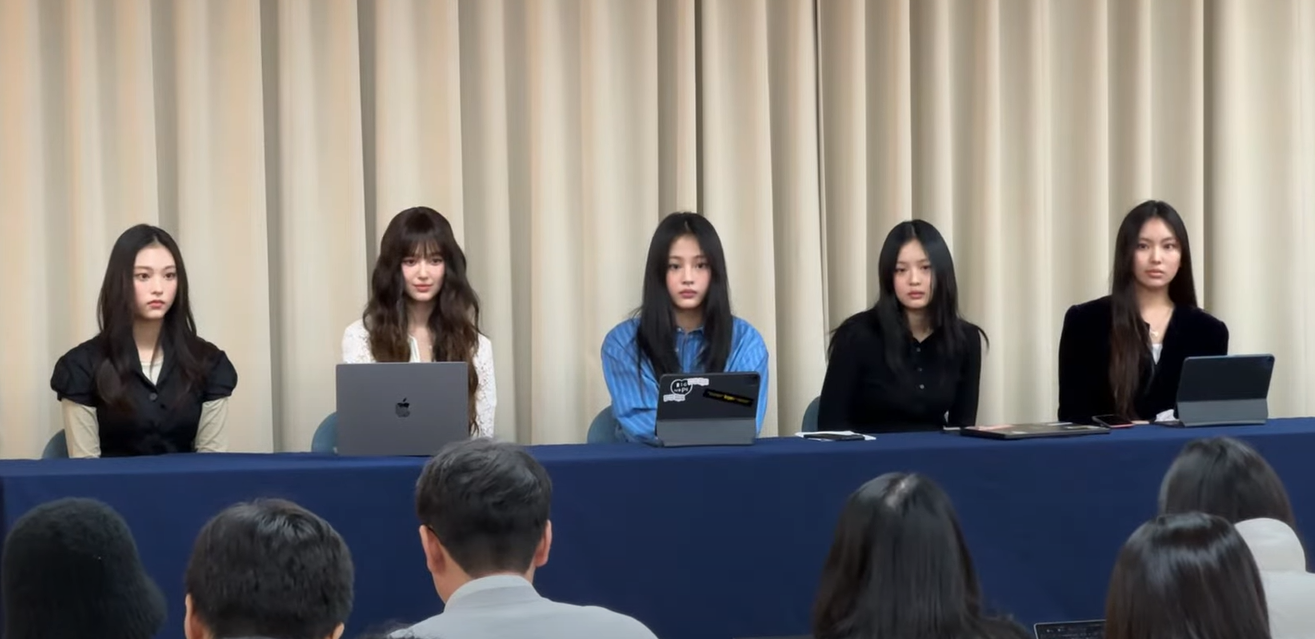
NewJeans hosting a press conference on November 28, 2024

On November 13, Yonhap News reported that the NewJeans members had sent ADOR a formal notice demanding that the company address alleged contractual breaches within 14 days or face termination of their exclusive contracts. The letter followed the rejection of their request to reinstate Min as ADOR's CEO and the leak of an internal Hybe document that appeared to suggest the company intended to discard the group. On November 28, the five members announced that they were terminating their exclusive contracts with ADOR, alleging that the company had breached several contractual obligations, including those concerning artist protection.

The following day, the members said they intended to continue their activities independently and seek the right to use the NewJeans name.

On December 5, ADOR filed a lawsuit seeking a court ruling confirming the validity of the members' exclusive contracts with the agency.

On December 14, the five members opened a separate Instagram account, "jeanzforfree", independent of the official account managed by ADOR. In their first post, they shared information about free food and drinks available to K-pop fans attending a rally in Yeouido, Seoul, in support of the impeachment of South Korean president Yoon Suk Yeol.

The legal dispute continued into the following year. On January 13, 2025, ADOR asked the Seoul Central District Court to prevent the members from independently entering into advertising contracts while the dispute over their exclusive agreements remained unresolved. On February 7, the members announced that they would perform under a new name, "NJZ". They were subsequently announced as headliners for the Hong Kong edition of ComplexCon, scheduled for March 23, under that name.

Two days before the scheduled performance, ADOR secured a preliminary injunction barring the members from pursuing independent entertainment activities. Despite the ruling, the group performed at ComplexCon as NJZ on March 23, debuting the unreleased song "Pit Stop" alongside several cover songs. At the end of the performance, the members announced an indefinite suspension of their activities.

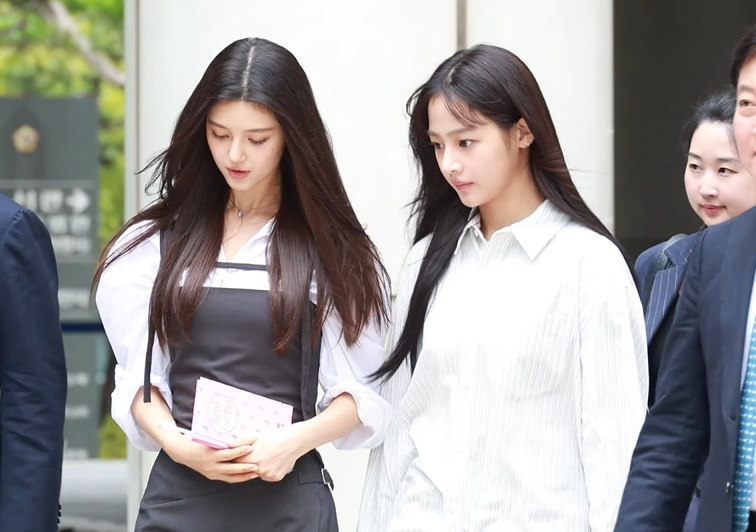
Danielle and Minji leaving court on August 14, 2025, after a mediation attempt

The group filed an objection to the injunction, but the court upheld the injunction in ADOR's favor in April. NewJeans subsequently appealed to the Seoul High Court and discontinued its use of the name "NJZ". On May 30, the same District Court ordered each member to pay ADOR ₩1 billion (US$746,114.98) for every unauthorized activity carried out from that date onward.

The Seoul High Court rejected the group's appeal on June 18, upholding the restrictions on its independent activities. In response, ADOR issued a statement expressing hope that the members would return "to where they belong".

The Seoul Central District Court subsequently held mediation sessions between the group and ADOR on August 14 and September 11, but neither resulted in an agreement. On October 30, the court ruled in ADOR's favor, confirming the validity of the exclusive contracts until 2029. The members announced that they intended to appeal the decision.

On November 12, ADOR announced that Haerin and Hyein had agreed to resume working with the label. The other three members subsequently announced their intention to return, although ADOR said it was still "confirming the sincerity of [their intentions]".

A further change in the group's lineup was announced on December 29, when ADOR confirmed that Hanni would return to the company and that Danielle's exclusive contract had been terminated. The following day, the company filed a lawsuit against Danielle and other alleged close collaborators, seeking ₩43 billion (US$32.08 million) in damages. Minji's contract discussions remained unresolved. On May 7, 2026, ADOR said discussions concerning Minji's future with the company were continuing and described their progress as "positive".

=== 2026–present: Resumption of activities ===
On July 22, 2026, several short videos and photos were posted to NewJeans' social media accounts to promote "2026 Summer of NewJeans", prompting speculation about the group's return. ADOR subsequently stated that no decisions had been made about future activities and that further announcements would be made after discussions with the members had concluded.

On August 14, Haerin appeared in Marie Claire Korea for Dior Beauty, marking her first project with ADOR since the lawsuit. She also attended a Dior Beauty pop-up store on September 8, and on November 20. Hyein made her own return to individual activities on August 22, appearing in Harper's Bazaar Korea for Bottega Veneta.

== Artistry ==
=== Musical style and lyrics ===
NewJeans's music incorporates elements of R&B, electropop, and hip hop. Their sound is characterized by mellow rhythms, atmospheric synthesizers, and live vocals. Their debut EP and first single album OMG drew on midtempo pop and R&B, with influences from the music of the 1990s and 2000s. Critics noted similarities to the sound of late-1990s K-pop girl groups. Their music also incorporates electronic and dance styles associated with the late 1990s and mid-2000s, including UK garage, Baltimore club, Jersey club, and moombahton. The group's second EP, Get Up, placed greater emphasis on dance and club music. Its more rhythm-driven production developed the UK garage influences present in earlier releases. In 2024, the group explored new jack swing and dance-pop on their Japanese release "Supernatural". The song interpolates "Back of My Mind", a 2009 track by Japanese singer Manami produced by Pharrell Williams.

The retro influences in NewJeans's music have also been associated with the newtro aesthetic. The Hankook Ilbo linked the group's style to this trend, while its music critic Choi Eun-seo described their sound as "easy listening", contrasting it with the prominent use of "explosive" EDM embellishments in contemporary popular music. NPR's Sheldon Pearce and Joshua Minsoo Kim similarly contrasted the group's relatively restrained sound with the "maximalist" and "harsh, buzzing" production associated with some of their contemporaries. Laura Snapes of The Guardian described their songs as "sleek and lethally hooky, yet playful and teeming with retro synths and experimental flourishes". Writing in The Korea Times, scholar and cultural critic David Tizzard has also discussed the influence of 1990s British jungle and drum and bass on NewJeans's music. He singled out the 2024 track "Right Now", noting that its polished production and restrained use of gritty samples distinguish it from classic jungle and drum and bass. Tizzard compared its sound to the work of DJ Marky and the Sambass subgenre rather than the style associated with LTJ Bukem.

NewJeans's music was primarily produced by South Korean musicians 250 and Park Jin-su (also known as FRNK), while the members have also contributed to songwriting. The members have cited films and television programmes as influences, particularly high school teen dramas such as Clueless (1995), Mean Girls (2004), and The Princess Diaries (2001). Executive producer Min Hee-jin selected the group's songs and oversaw the recording process. Discussing the group's debut EP, Min said she "wanted to break the tacit formula of K-pop and make an album with the music I want". Min expressed a dislike for "high-pitched parts, awkward raps that suddenly appear, and singing methods that feel uniform". She consequently opted to record without guide vocals, giving the members greater freedom in their vocal performances. Pearce argued that the group's recurring collaborations with certain producers contributed to consistency in its discography and sound.

=== Image and fashion ===
NewJeans's fashion and make-up have influenced trends in South Korea, with their image developed by stylist Choi Yu-mi. Choi had previously met Min Hee-jin while working with Shinee and began collaborating with Min and NewJeans in 2020, despite having no prior experience styling a girl group. Min said she wanted the group's image to be "cool, chill, and sophisticated". The group debuted with a Y2K-inspired style that became associated with the revival of the trend in South Korea. Their music videos featured markedly different outfits for each member, a styling choice intended to encourage viewers to rewatch the videos and identify the performers.

Hairstylist Gi-hee and make-up artist Lee Nak-yeum developed the group's understated appearance, characterized by natural-looking hair and make-up. In Vogue Singapore, Azrin Tan described this approach as a "new aesthetic", citing its minimal make-up and straight black hair as a departure from prevailing K-pop beauty standards. The styling contributed in shaping NewJeans's girl-next-door image, deemed by Tan a "stark shift away from the usually high-octane aesthetic" of contemporary K-pop groups.

The music videos for Get Up featured several distinct styling concepts, including cheerleading and ballet-inspired outfits. Since the group's debut, stylist Choi Yu-mi has incorporated elements of contemporary fashion trends, including gorpcore and blokecore, as well as designs by Kiko Kostadinov, Martine Rose, Marine Serre, and Hyein Seo. Edith Winslow of Vogue Australia described their style as a combination of "bold pieces, contemporary designers, and the confidence to pull it all off". In December 2023, The New York Times included the group among its most stylish people of the year.

The members have also discussed their interest in experimenting with different styles and using fashion as a means of self-expression. Julian Bartolome of Inquirer Super described the members as having "established themselves as modern-teen style icons". They have also entered partnerships with several fashion and beauty houses. Hanni has represented Gucci, Armani Beauty, and UGG; Hyein has represented Louis Vuitton; Danielle has represented Burberry, YSL Beauty, and Celine; Minji has represented Chanel Korea; and Haerin has represented Dior.

== Other ventures ==
=== Endorsements ===
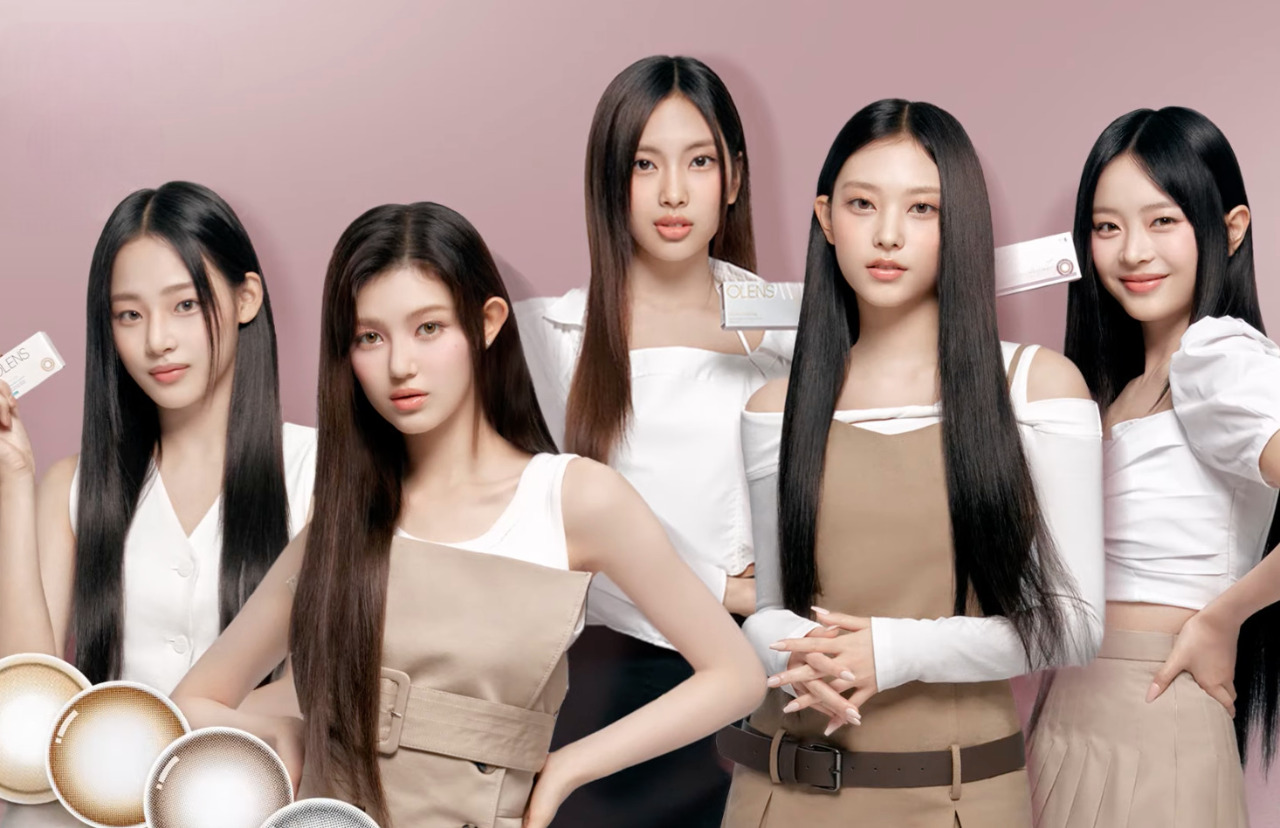
NewJeans in an advertisement for Olens in 2023

In the advertising industry, NewJeans has been compared to a blue chip due to their popularity and reliability; Tamar Herman, writing for NME, named them one of "the most in-demand advertising models" at the end of 2023. In April 2024, Forbes Korea reported that the group had earned ₩30 billion in advertising in the course of a single year. Their popularity has been ascribed to their notable influence over various generations, in particular Generation Z, both in South Korea and overseas, prompting South Korean brands like Musinsa and Lotte Wellfood to appoint NewJeans as ambassadors to lead promotional campaigns abroad. Following the advertisement campaigns Musinsa doubled sales in the women's fashion category and Lotte's Pepero sales increased by 17%. NewJeans has also represented Levi's, Calvin Klein, contact lens brand Olens, jewelry brand Stonehenge, and eyewear brand Carin. They have served as global ambassadors for Coca-Cola Zero Sugar, LG Electronics' Gram, whose laptops rapidly sold out, Lotte's Pepero, and Indofood's Indomie. Over the course of their career, NewJeans has also appeared in local and international promotional campaigns by SK Telecom, promoting the iPhone 14 Pro and the iPhone 15 Pro, Apple, Nike, promoting Air Max, 5252 by OiOi, Shinhan Bank, Megastudy, Pinkfong, McDonald's Korea, Hyundai Department Store, Lotte, Kao, and Shibuya109.

NewJeans have also worked with governmental and cultural institutions to promote Korean culture and tourism. In February 2023, NewJeans became public relations ambassadors of the city of Seoul and were appointed honorary ambassadors for the Seoul Fashion Week. In March 2024, they were appointed ambassadors by the customs division of the Incheon International Airport. In May 2024, NewJeans and the British Museum collaborated on the recording of an audio guide illustrating the Korean exhibit of the museum. In July 2024, NewJeans were appointed honorary ambassadors by the Ministry of Culture, Sports and Tourism and subsequently starred in a series of commercials promoting local tourism. NewJeans have also worked with the Korea Craft and Design Foundation to promote hanji.

NewJeans has partnered with various companies for the launch of cross branded products. The products are often available in pop-up stores in Seoul, plus other countries for international brands. The list of cross branded partners includes: Nudake dessert brand (December 2022), Musinsa and LG Electronics (January 2023), McDonald's (June 2023), Line Friends in both August 2023 and June 2024, Nike (January 2024) exclusively available at Nike's store on Orchard Road, Singapore, Krafton (June 2024) releasing NewJeans's playable characters inside PUBG, Takashi Murakami and Japanese designer Hiroshi Fujiwara (May 2024) for the "Supernatural" and "Right Now" releases.

=== Philanthropy ===
In December 2022, it was announced that NewJeans and ADOR would annually donate part of the profits from the group's album sales to the Snail of Love charity to fund cochlear implant surgery and speech therapy treatment for the hearing-impaired. The following year, ADOR and NewJeans joined the Snail of Love's Soul Leader club, having donated a total of over ₩99 million. In February 2023, NewJeans and ADOR donated ₩200 million to the World Food Programme to help victims of the earthquake that struck Turkey and Syria that month. In May 2024, NewJeans donated all proceeds from their performances at seven university festivals to the Korea Scholarship Foundation. In December 2024, the five members donated in their own name 100 million won, approximately $69,000, to children's charity ChildFund Korea.

== Impact ==
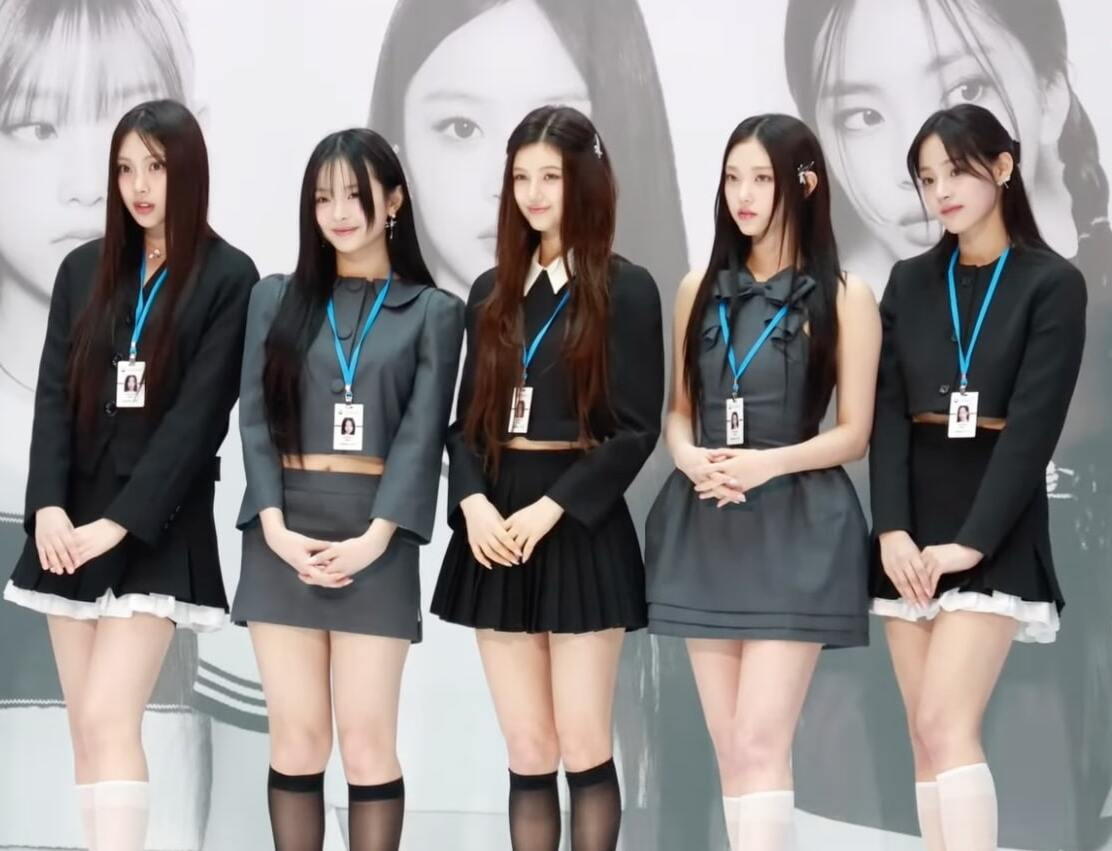
NewJeans at a ceremony to become ambassadors for Incheon Airport in 2024

NewJeans has become "one of the most recognized and most influential groups in pop", according to Billboard. The Times of India referred to NewJeans as a global pop icon, remarking that "they have secured a spot in the heart of pop enthusiasts around the world and became the epitome of modern pop excellence". Time named them one of the Next Generation Leaders, adding that they have "already reached global milestones even faster than its more senior counterparts in the industry". Music critic Jung Min-jae told NBC News that "NewJeans is everything contemporary K-pop was not, arriving fresh-faced in a seemingly unchanging industry". Writing for The Korea Times, music critic Kim Do-heon attributed NewJeans's success in part to their "carefree, laid-back, and natural" sound, while Tamar Herman wrote in Vogue that their music "immediately changed up the face of South Korea's pop idol scene". Critics noted NewJeans's influence on junior K-pop boy groups like Riize and TWS, who adopted a similar concept and "easy listening" sound. Business Insider opined "NewJeans has become a force and musical paradigm shifter both within the Korean and global pop landscapes." NewJeans has been featured in numerous power rankings, including Forbes's Korea Power Celebrity 40 and 30 Under 30 – Asia (Entertainment & Sports).

NewJeans quickly established themselves in the fashion industry thanks to their girl-next-door image and international appeal, becoming "an overnight fashion favorite" according to The Business of Fashion. Designers Yoon Ahn and Bach Mai have named NewJeans among the influences for their collections. NewJeans has been recognized for their influence and contribution to the fashion industry; they received the Korea Fashion Industry Association President's Commendation at the 2023 Korea Fashion Awards and were listed as one of the 500 most influential people in the industry by The Business of Fashion in 2023.

== Legal matters ==
=== Members' contracts ===
On November 5, 2026, The New York Times published an investigation into the 2022 contracts between the members and ADOR. The report found that the agreements omitted several government-recommended safeguards for the underage members, including provisions concerning education, rest, and working conditions. It also reported that ADOR retained extensive rights to use the members' names, images, and voices, including in AI-generated content, even after the expiration of their contracts. Hybe said the agreements complied with South Korean law and were drawn up in good faith after discussions between ADOR and members. The company disputed conclusions from the investigation, stating that it followed child-protection requirements and had not pressured the members to give up their education or undergo cosmetic procedures. It also questioned the significance of concerns over contractual penalties, maintaining that a different calculation method would have made little difference.

The next day, ADOR issued a statement disputing the investigation, asserting that the contracts had been negotiated and finalized jointly by Min Hee-jin, the vice president she had appointed, the members and their parents, and the legal representatives of some members. The label maintained that the agreements contained provisions protecting the members' rights and that the controversial clauses neither disadvantaged them nor differed in their practical effect from the government-standard contract. Later that day, Min's representatives rejected claims that she had been responsible for the contracts, explaining that "ADOR had no independent legal team, and Hybe's legal team led the drafting and revision of the contracts". They noted that the agreements also required approval from Hybe's legal department, chief financial officer and chief executive officer, as well as its board of directors. In their view, this undermined the argument that individual labels had independent decision-making authority. They also maintained that the clauses concerning the use of the members' images and voices had been drafted and determined by Hybe's legal team.

On November 9, the Korea Music Copyright Association (KOMCA) pushed back against the investigation, arguing that it presented a one-sided picture of the K-pop industry. The association said the report failed to take sufficient account of South Korea's legal framework and the way K-pop agencies develop their artists. It maintained that contracts should be considered as a whole, including relevant laws, supplementary agreements and how their terms are applied, rather than focusing on individual clauses. Korea Popmusic Industry Association (KPIA) also highlighted measures intended to protect underage artists, such as safeguards for personal rights, sleep, education and rest, along with safeguarding staff and access to medical care. The association defended the industry's training system and warned that making confidential contracts public could give the impression that individual disputes reflect wider problems across the industry.

=== Copyright infringement allegations ===
In July 2024, British jazz-funk band Shakatak alleged that "Bubble Gum" infringed their 1981 song "Easier Said Than Done". Through publisher Wise Music Group, the band sent a letter of claim to ADOR, Hybe, the Korea Music Copyright Association, and Sony Music Publishing Hong Kong, citing similarities in melody, rhythm, instrumentation, harmony, and tempo, and seeking an end to its use and compensation. ADOR denied the claims, stating it had responded to the legal notice on behalf of the songwriters and requested a "credible analysis report" from Wise Music Group, arguing that the burden of proof rested with the accuser. Shakatak later announced that Wise Music Group had hired a musicologist to assess the alleged similarities. On July 23, ADOR reiterated that the songwriters had not known "Easier Said Than Done" before the allegations and said independent musicological analyses found differences in chord progression, tempo, and overall musical character between the songs. As of November 2026, no further public developments or resolution have occurred. No official analysis report has been released, and the dispute has not proceeded to litigation.

On May 8, 2026, four composers filed a copyright infringement lawsuit alleging that "How Sweet" plagiarized elements of their demo "One of a Kind". The plaintiffs claimed they had written and recorded "One of a Kind" for NewJeans in January 2024, and that "How Sweet" contained a substantially similar first verse, including a 31-note topline melody sequence across eight measures in 4/4 time and the key of B-flat minor. ADOR denied the allegations, stating that it had confirmed with the song's production team, BANA (Beasts And Natives Alike), that no plagiarism had occurred. On July 10, ADOR said that "How Sweet" was obtained through BANA in connection with former CEO Min Hee-jin and that it was reviewing internal documents to determine whether proper similarity assessments had been conducted at the time. As of November 2026, there has been little movement with the case.

On July 7, 2026, U.S. copyright management company All Surface Publishing filed a lawsuit in the U.S. District Court for the Central District of California against the parties involved with "ETA". The company alleged that "ETA" copied the backing track of DJ Debonair Samir's 2005 dance song "Samir's Theme", including its syncopated horn melody, 16th-note rhythm, and bass drum pattern. ADOR stated that, as with "How Sweet", the song was obtained through BANA during Min's tenure, and its development was also being reviewed. As of November 2026, there has been little movement with the case.

== Members ==
Current

- Minji (민지)
- Hanni (하니)
- Haerin (해린)
- Hyein (혜인)

Former

- Danielle (다니엘) (2022–2025)

=== Timeline ===
Despite taking part in photoshoot called, "2026 Summer of NewJeans", Minji's status in the group has yet to be confirmed

== Discography ==
Extended plays

- New Jeans (2022)
- Get Up (2023)

== Filmography ==
Television shows

- NewJeans Code in Busan (2022)

== Accolades ==
NewJeans received several awards following their debut in 2022, including multiple rookie awards at the Golden Disc Awards, the Korean Music Awards, the Melon Music Awards, and the Seoul Music Awards. Their debut extended play won Best K-pop Album at the 20th Korean Music Awards, while "Attention" received a Digital Song Bonsang at the 37th Golden Disc Awards. Following the success of their 2023 releases, OMG and Get Up, the group won several awards, including Artist of the Year at both the 2023 MAMA Awards and 2023 Melon Music Awards, becoming the first female act to achieve the distinction in the same year. At the latter ceremony, they also won Best Female Group and Song of the Year for "Ditto", which subsequently received the Digital Daesang at the 38th Golden Disc Awards and Song of the Year at the 8th Asia Artist Awards, where the group also won Singer of the Year. Their single "OMG" won Best Song Award at the 33rd Seoul Music Awards. Internationally, NewJeans became the first foreign act to receive the Excellent Work Award and a Grand Prix nomination for "Ditto" at the Japan Record Awards, and won Top Global K-Pop Artist at the 2023 Billboard Music Awards.

== See also ==
- List of best-selling girl group albums
