= Korea Grand Music Awards =

Annual South Korean music awards

- Current: 2025 Korea Grand Music Awards
- Awarded for: Outstanding achievements in the Korean music industry
- Country: South Korea
- Presented by: Ilgan Sports
- First award: 2024
- Website: Official website

The Korea Grand Music Awards (Korean: 코리아 그랜드 뮤직 어워즈) is an annual South Korean music awards ceremony that honors achievements in various categories of Korean popular music, such as K-pop and trot, domestically and internationally. The awards ceremony was established by Ilgan Sports, who previously created the Golden Disc Awards in 1984 and organized it until 2020, in celebration of the newspaper's 55th anniversary. It was created with the purpose of honoring artists who have played a role in spreading Korean culture around the world and bringing together the past, present, and future artists of Korean popular music. The winners will be selected based on expert judge evaluations, digital music and album sales, and mobile fan voting.

== History ==
The first ceremony was held on November 16 to 17, 2024 at the Inspire Arena in Incheon, South Korea. The ceremony's production headed by Han Dong-chul, the CEO of Funky Studio, which created the MAMA Awards. Hanni of NewJeans and Nam Ji-hyun were announced as the hosts for the ceremony's first day, while Winter of Aespa and Nam would be the hosts for the second day. The line-up of artists in attendance consists of NewJeans, Aespa, Ateez, Zerobaseone, NiziU and Taemin among others. It was live streamed via Kiswe. The event was live stream via BLVD United In partnership with Kiswe

== Ceremonies ==
Edition	Year	Date of ceremony	City	Venue	Hosts	Ref.
1st	2024	November 16–17, 2024	Incheon	Inspire Arena	Nam Ji-hyun, Hanni, Winter	
2nd	2025	November 14–15, 2025	Incheon	Inspire Arena	Nam Ji-hyun, Irene, Natty	
3rd	2026	November 7–8, 2026	Seoul	Gocheok Sky Dome	Nam Ji-hyun, Woni, Kim Jae-won, Liz	

== Award categories ==
=== Grand prizes ===
The five grand prizes (known as daesang):

- Grand Artist
- Grand Honor's Choice
- Grand Performer
- Grand Record
- Grand Song

=== Competitive awards ===
Unless otherwise noted, each award category was introduced in 2024.

- Best Adult Contemporary
- Best Artist 10
- Best Band
- Best Group
- Best Hip-Hop
- Best Memory
- Best OST
- Best R&B
- Best Rock Ballad
- Best Solo Artist
- Best Song 10
- Best Stage

=== Popularity awards ===
Unless otherwise noted, each award category was introduced in 2024.

- Best Popularity
- Fan Vote Rookie

=== Special awards ===
Unless otherwise noted, each award category was introduced in 2024.

- Best Producer
- Best Selling Album
- IS Rising Star
- IS Rookies
- K-pop Global Artist
- K-pop Global Rookies
- K-pop Legendary Artist
- Most Streamed Song
- Photogenic

== Most wins ==
The following artists received three or more awards:

Rank	Artist(s)	Awards
1	Lee Chan-won	9
2	Ateez	7
3	Aespa	6
3	Stray Kids	6
3	Treasure	6
4	Ive	4
4	Riize	4
5	Day6	3
5	Taemin	3
5	Young Tak	3
5	D.O.	3
5	NewJeans	3
5	Seventeen	3
5	Unis	3
