= 37th Golden Disc Awards =

2023 South Korean music awards ceremony

- Title card
- Date: January 7, 2023
- Venue: Rajamangala Stadium
- Country: Thailand
- Hosted by: Sung Si-kyung; Lee Da-hee; Nichkhun; Park So-dam
- Website: goldendisc.co.kr

The 37th Golden Disc Awards (Korean: 37th 골든 디스크 시상식; RR: 37th Goldeun diseukeu sisangsik) was an award ceremony held on January 7, 2023, and broadcast through various television networks and streaming platforms in various countries. The ceremony was hosted by Sung Si-kyung, Lee Da-hee, Nichkhun, and Park So-dam.

== Criteria ==
All songs and albums that are eligible to be nominated must be released between early-November 2021 and mid-November 2022. Songs and albums that were excluded from the nominations in the 36th edition due to overlapping in the counting deadline were included in this edition.

Category	Online voting	Panelist (Note: Panelist consisted of professionals such as industry officials, K-pop reporters, music program producers, pop culture critics, major distribution officials, and Golden Disc Awards evaluation committee.)	Sales
Digital Daesang (Song of the Year)	N/A	40%	60%
Disc Daesang (Album of the Year)	N/A	40%	60%
Digital Song Bonsang	N/A	40%	60%
Album Bonsang	N/A	40%	60%
Rookie Artist of the Year (Note: Applies to all digital singles, extended plays/single albums with 6 or less songs, and studio albums.)	N/A	40%	60%
Most Popular Artist Award	100%	N/A	

== Winners and nominees ==
Winners and nominees are listed in alphabetical order. Winners are listed first and emphasized in bold.

=== Main awards ===
The list of nominees except Digital Daesang (Song of the Year) and Disc Daesang (Album of the Year) were announced on December 7, 2022, through the official website. The nominees for Digital Daesang (Song of the Year) and Disc Daesang (Album of the Year) will be chosen from the winners of Digital Song Daesang and Album Bonsang. The list of nominees for Most Popular Artist Award was announced through TikTok on December 20.

Digital Daesang (Song of the Year)	Disc Daesang (Album of the Year)
**Ive – "Love Dive"**; (G)I-dle – "Tomboy"; Big Bang – "Still Life"; Jay Park – "Ganadara" (feat. IU); Kim Min-seok (MeloMance) – "Drunken Confession"; Lim Young-woong – "Our Blues, Our Life"; NewJeans – "Attention"; Psy – "That That" (feat. Suga)	**BTS – Proof**; Blackpink – Born Pink; Enhypen – Manifesto: Day 1; NCT – Universe; NCT 127 – 2 Baddies; NCT Dream – Glitch Mode; Seventeen – Face the Sun; Stray Kids – Maxident
Digital Song Bonsang	Album Bonsang
**(G)I-dle – "Tomboy"**; **Big Bang – "Still Life"**; **Ive – "Love Dive"**; **Jay Park – "Ganadara" (feat. IU)**; **Kim Min-seok (MeloMance) – "Drunken Confession"**; **Lim Young-woong – "Our Blues, Our Life"**; **NewJeans – "Attention"**; **Psy – "That That" (feat. Suga)**; Be'O – "Counting Stars" (feat. Beenzino); Big Naughty – "Beyond Love" (feat. 10cm); Blackpink – "Pink Venom"; Choi Ye-na – "Smiley" (feat. Bibi); Got the Beat – "Step Back"; IU – "Drama"; KyoungSeo – "Dear My X"; Le Sserafim – "Fearless"; Lee Mu-jin – "When It Snows" (feat. Heize); MSG Wannabe (M.O.M) – "Do You Want to Hear"; Nayeon – "Pop!"; Red Velvet – "Feel My Rhythm"; Taeyeon – "INVU"	**Blackpink – Born Pink**; **BTS – Proof**; **Enhypen – Manifesto: Day 1**; **NCT – Universe**; **NCT 127 – 2 Baddies**; **NCT Dream – Glitch Mode**; **Seventeen – Face the Sun**; **Stray Kids – Maxident**; (G)I-dle – I Love; Ateez – The World EP.1: Movement; Itzy – Checkmate; J-Hope – Jack in the Box; Kim Ho-joong – Panorama; Lim Young-woong – Im Hero; Nayeon – Im Nayeon; Red Velvet – The ReVe Festival 2022 – Feel My Rhythm; SM Town – 2021 Winter SM Town: SMCU Express; The Boyz – Be Aware; Treasure – The Second Step: Chapter One; Twice – Between 1&2; Young Tak – Mmm
Rookie Artist of the Year	TikTok Most Popular Artist Award
**Ive**; **Le Sserafim**; **NewJeans**; ATBO; Billlie; Blank2y; Choi Ye-na; Kep1er; Nmixx; Tempest; TNX; Xdinary Heroes	**BTS**; Ateez; Be'O; Big Naughty; Big Bang; Blackpink; Choi Ye-na; Enhypen; Got the Beat; Itzy; IU; Ive; J-Hope; Jay Park; Kim Ho-joong; Kim Min-seok; KyoungSeo; Le Sserafim; Lee Mu-jin; Lim Young-woong; MSG Wannabe (M.O.M); Nayeon; NCT; NCT 127; NCT Dream; NewJeans; Psy; Red Velvet; Seventeen; SM Town; Taeyeon; The Boyz; Treasure; Twice; Young Tak

=== Other awards ===
Artist of the Year
**Psy**
Best Group	Best Solo Artist
**Treasure**	**Be'O**; **Younha**
Best R&B/Hip Hop Award	Thai K-pop Artist
**Big Naughty**	**Seventeen**
Best Performance	Best Producer
**Seventeen**	**Seo Hyun-joo (Starship Entertainment)**
Most Popular Artist	Thai Fans Support with Baoji
**(G)I-dle**; **Stray Kids**	**J-Hope**

=== Multiple awards ===
The following artist(s) received three awards:

Awards	Artist(s)
3	BTS
3	Ive
3	Seventeen

== Performers ==
The first lineup was announced on December 7, 2022. The second and third lineup were announced on December 14, 2022, and January 5, 2023, respectively.

Order of the performance, name of the artist(s), and song(s) they performed
Order	Artist(s)	Song(s)
1	NewJeans	"Attention" (Golden Disc version) "Hype Boy" "OMG"
2	Big Naughty	"Frank Ocean" "Vancouver" "Beyond Love"
3	Le Sserafim	"The Great Mermaid" "Fearless" "Impurities" "No Celestial"
4	Treasure	"Boy" "Jikjin" "Darari" (rock version)
5	Younha	"Oort Cloud" "Event Horizon"
6	WeDemBoyz (Note: The performance was pre-recorded, not perform at Rajamangala Stadium.)	"Jiggle Jiggle" "Zoom" "Tomboy" "Rush Hour" "New Thing"
7	Kim Min-seok	"Perhaps Love" "Drunken Confession" "Gift"
8	Enhypen	"ParadoXXX Invasion" "Future Perfect (Pass the Mic)" "Shout Out"
9	Jay Park; Jeon So-yeon; Big Naughty	"L3gend"
10	Be'O	"MBTI" (band version) "Counting Stars" (band version) "Limousine" (band version)
11	Moonbyul	"On My Way" "Comma (,)"
12	(G)I-dle	"Villain Dies" "Tomboy"
13	Jay Park	"CEO Medley"
14	Lim Young-woong	"Our Blues, Our Life" "London Boy"
15	Stray Kids	"Super Board" "Freeze" "Case 143"
16	Seventeen	"Hot" "Cheers" "_World" "Don Quixote"
17	Psy	"That That" "Gangnam Style"

== Broadcast ==
Region	Network/Platform	Ref.
Japan	TBS; Paravi	
South Korea	JTBC; JTBC2; JTBC4	
Various	TikTok	
