= Hype Boy =

2022 single by NewJeans

Single by NewJeans

from the EP New Jeans
- Language: Korean; English
- Released: July 23, 2022
- Genre: Synth-pop; bubblegum pop; future bass
- Length: 2:59
- Label: ADOR
- Lyricists: Gigi; Ylva Dimberg; Hanni
- Producers: 250; Ylva Dimberg

NewJeans singles chronology
"Attention" (2022)	"Hype Boy" (2022)	"Cookie" (2022)

Performance video
- "Hype Boy" (Performance Ver.) on YouTube

"Hype Boy" is a song by the South Korean girl group NewJeans, taken from their debut extended play (EP), New Jeans (2022). ADOR, an independent division of Hybe Corporation, released four music videos for the song on July 23, 2022, each focusing on the members and their narratives. "Hype Boy" was officially released for download and streaming as the second single of the EP on August 1, 2022.

250 and Ylva Dimberg produced "Hype Boy", while the latter wrote the lyrics with Gigi and NewJeans' member Hanni. An incorporation of future bass and pop styles, it is driven by pulsing synthesizers and distorted instrumentals that contain influences from 1990s and 2000s styles such as R&B, electronic, and moombahton. "Hype Boy" received praise from music critics for its nostalgic production style that evoked a dreamy atmosphere. NME named "Hype Boy" the best K-pop release of 2022, while NPR and Rolling Stone included it in their lists of the best songs of 2022.

The single peaked at number two on South Korea's Circle Digital Chart and reached the top 10 in Malaysia, Singapore, Taiwan, and Vietnam. The Korea Music Content Association (KMCA) certified the track double platinum for exceeding 200 million streams in South Korea, while the Recording Industry Association of Japan (RIAJ) certified the track platinum for exceeding 100 million streams in the country. "Hype Boy" also broke the record for the longest-running song on the Billboard Global 200 by a K-pop female act, charting for 42 weeks.

== Background and release ==
Music videos for "Hype Boy"
- "Minji Ver." on YouTube
- "Hyein Ver." on YouTube
- "Hanni Ver." on YouTube
- "Danielle&Haerin Ver." on YouTube

The South Korean idol girl group NewJeans was formed and signed with ADOR, an independent division of Hybe Corporation, under the direction of its CEO Min Hee-jin. The group's debut single, "Attention", was surprise-released on July 22, 2022, without any prior information regarding the group's lineup. The following day, ADOR announced a four-track extended play (EP), New Jeans, which was set for release on August 1, and released "Hype Boy" as the group's second single. "Hype Boy" was accompanied by a 50-second clip introducing the five members' names and four music videos specific to the members' perspectives.

Of the four music videos, three were for individual members Minji, Hyein, and Hanni, and one was for a collective unit of Haerin and Danielle. Min explained that by unveiling "Attention" without confirming the members' names and subsequently releasing "Hype Boy", which featured the members individually, she anticipated that viewers would revisit the first video to seek further information about them. In each video, the members invite their "hype boy", or love interest, to a pool party with them. They ultimately see a different side of their "hype boy" contrary to what they initially admired or anticipated. "Hype Boy" was one of the EP's three singles; on August 4, NewJeans held their debut stage on Mnet's M Countdown, where they performed all singles from their self-titled EP, including "Hype Boy".

To promote "Hype Boy", NewJeans performed the song on the South Korean music programs of M Countdown, Music Bank, and Inkigayo in 2022. They performed the song across various music festivals, including the KCON in Saudi Arabia, the 2022 KBS Song Festival and 2023 K-pop Super Live in Seoul, Lollapalooza in the U.S., the Summer Sonic Festival in Japan, and Music Bank in Mexico. At year-end award shows, it was performed during the 2022 The Fact Music Awards, 43rd Blue Dragon Film Awards, 2022 Melon Music Awards, twice during the 2022 MAMA Awards, and 37th Golden Disc Awards. NewJeans also featured the song during a live performance at the 36th Tokyo Girls Collection and their July 2023 Bunnies Camp fan meeting.

== Composition and lyrics ==
"Hype Boy"
"Hype Boy" evokes various 1990s and 2000s styles such as R&B, moombahton, and electronic.

Gigi, Ylva Dimberg, and the member Hanni wrote the lyrics to "Hype Boy", a song that captures the essence of young love akin to a daydream. It contains lyrics in both Korean and English, and runs for two minutes and 56 seconds long. The chorus is sung by the members Haerin and Danielle: "'Cause I know what you like, boy/ You're my chemical hype boy." According to NME's Rhian Daly, Hanni's input helped usher in a female perspective for a girl-group song, which deviated from the "male gaze" that had dominated K-pop idol music.

Dimberg and 250 produced "Hype Boy", and the latter programmed the instrumentals. It is composed in the key of E minor, with a tempo of 100 beats per minute. "Hype Boy" is propelled by pulsing synthesizers and distorted instrumentals. It is a future bass, bubblegum pop, and synth-pop song that incorporates influences of 1990s R&B and electronic music, while its rhythms evoke moombahton. The members sing with their unmanipulated vocals over R&B beats. According to the South Korean digital music site Melon, "Hype Boy" is a hybrid of moombahton and electropop that has a "unique pre-chorus" and highlights individual members' vocals.

Carmen Chin of NME felt that the production was reminiscent of 2000s music but had a modern twist. Chin noted that the track's arrangement, infused with "tropical touches and future bass", created a "dreamy" and "almost hazy atmosphere". Writing for the same publication, Derrick Tan said the song's production resembled the music of Kaytranada and described NewJeans' vocals as "honeyed" that "[belt] out passionately in the euphoric chorus". Time's Kat Moon wrote the track featured "soft" beats and "mellow" instrumentals but described the vocals in the chorus as "soaring".

== Reception ==
"Hype Boy" received positive reviews from music critics and appeared on many year-end rankings of the best songs of 2022. Rolling Stone placed "Hype Boy" at number 24 on their list of the top 100 songs of 2022, highlighting it as a "standout" from the group's EP with "its addictive choreography and catchy chorus". NPR ranked it 85th, with the editor Sheldon Pearce characterizing it as "transformative, precisely and gently blended". NME ranked "Hype Boy" first on their list of the 25 best K-pop songs of the year, calling it "three minutes of pop perfection". The magazine ranked it 26th on their overall list of the best songs of the year, with Daly describing it as a refreshing sound that made NewJeans stand out in a pool of similar-sounding K-pop groups. On other K-pop year-end lists, "Hype Boy" appeared at number one on the list by Riff Magazine, number two by Insider and number four by The Korea Herald. It was also featured on unranked lists of the year's best K-pop songs by Nylon, Teen Vogue, Time, Idology, and CNN Philippines, with many comments praising its retro-styled production that brought forth a nostalgic yet also modern feel.

Commercially, "Hype Boy" debuted at number 116 on the Billboard Global 200 and peaked at number 52. It set the record for the longest-charting song by a K-pop girl group on the Billboard Global 200 chart, spending 42 weeks in total. In the group's native South Korea, "Hype Boy" was a commercial success, prompting TikTok dance challenges and covers by other K-pop groups. On the music streaming service Melon, "Hype Boy" alongside "Ditto" and "OMG" occupied the top three spots of the most-listened-to songs for two consecutive months, making NewJeans the first musician to do so in the site's 18-year history. By January 2023, it surpassed BTS' "Butter" as the most-streamed song on Spotify in South Korea. On the national Circle Digital Chart, the single peaked at number two. The Korea Music Content Association (KMCA) certified it double platinum for surpassing 200 million streams in South Korea. In Japan, "Hype Boy" peaked at number 41 on the Japan Hot 100 chart and was certified platinum by the Recording Industry Association of Japan (RIAJ) for accumulating over 100 million streams.

"Hype Boy" peaked at number five on the Singaporean chart compiled by the Recording Industry Association Singapore (RIAS). In other Asian music markets, the song peaked in the top 20 of Billboard's Hits of the World charts for Taiwan (9), Vietnam (9), Malaysia (10), the Philippines (11), Indonesia (16), and Hong Kong (19). In the Americas, "Hype Boy" charted at number 90 on the Argentina Hot 100 chart and number 95 on the Canadian Hot 100 chart.

== Accolades ==
"Hype Boy" received one music program award on Inkigayo on April 2, 2023, despite being released eight months prior. "Hype Boy" won Top 20 Songs of the Year (Overseas) at the 2022 Asian Pop Music Awards and was nominated for Artist of the Year – Global Digital Music (August) at the 2023 Circle Chart Music Awards. In November 2023, "Hype Boy" was voted the Song of the Year for 2023 by 200 music industry professionals in a survey conducted by JoyNews24. At the 2024 Circle Chart Music Awards, "Hype Boy" won the Music Steady Seller of the Year award in recognition of its longevity on the music charts.

== Charts ==
=== Weekly charts ===
Weekly chart performance
Chart (2022–2023)	Peak position
Argentina (Argentina Hot 100)	90
Canada Hot 100 (Billboard)	95
Global 200 (Billboard)	52
Hong Kong (Billboard)	18
Indonesia (Billboard)	16
Japan Hot 100 (Billboard)	41
Japan Combined Singles (Oricon)	33
Malaysia (Billboard)	10
Malaysia International (RIM)	19
Philippines (Billboard)	11
Singapore (Billboard)	6
Singapore (RIAS)	5
South Korea (Billboard)	1
South Korea (Circle)	2
Taiwan (Billboard)	9
Vietnam (Vietnam Hot 100)	9

=== Monthly charts ===
Monthly chart performance
Chart (2022)	Peak position
South Korea (Circle)	2

=== Year-end charts ===
2022 year-end chart performance for "Hype Boy"
Chart (2022)	Position
Global Excl. US (Billboard)	194
South Korea (Circle)	18

2023 year-end chart performance for "Hype Boy"
Chart (2023)	Position
Global 200 (Billboard)	147
Japan (Japan Hot 100)	68
South Korea (Circle)	2

2024 year-end chart performance for "Hype Boy"
Chart (2024)	Position
South Korea (Circle)	22

2025 year-end chart performance for "Hype Boy"
Chart (2025)	Position
South Korea (Circle)	45

== Certifications ==
Certifications
Region	Certification	Certified units/sales
New Zealand (RMNZ)	Gold	15,000^{‡}
Streaming
Japan (RIAJ)	2× Platinum	200,000,000^{†}
South Korea (KMCA)	3× Platinum	300,000,000^{†}
^{‡} Sales+streaming figures based on certification alone.^{†} Streaming-only figures based on certification alone.
