= Hyein =

South Korean singer (born 2008)

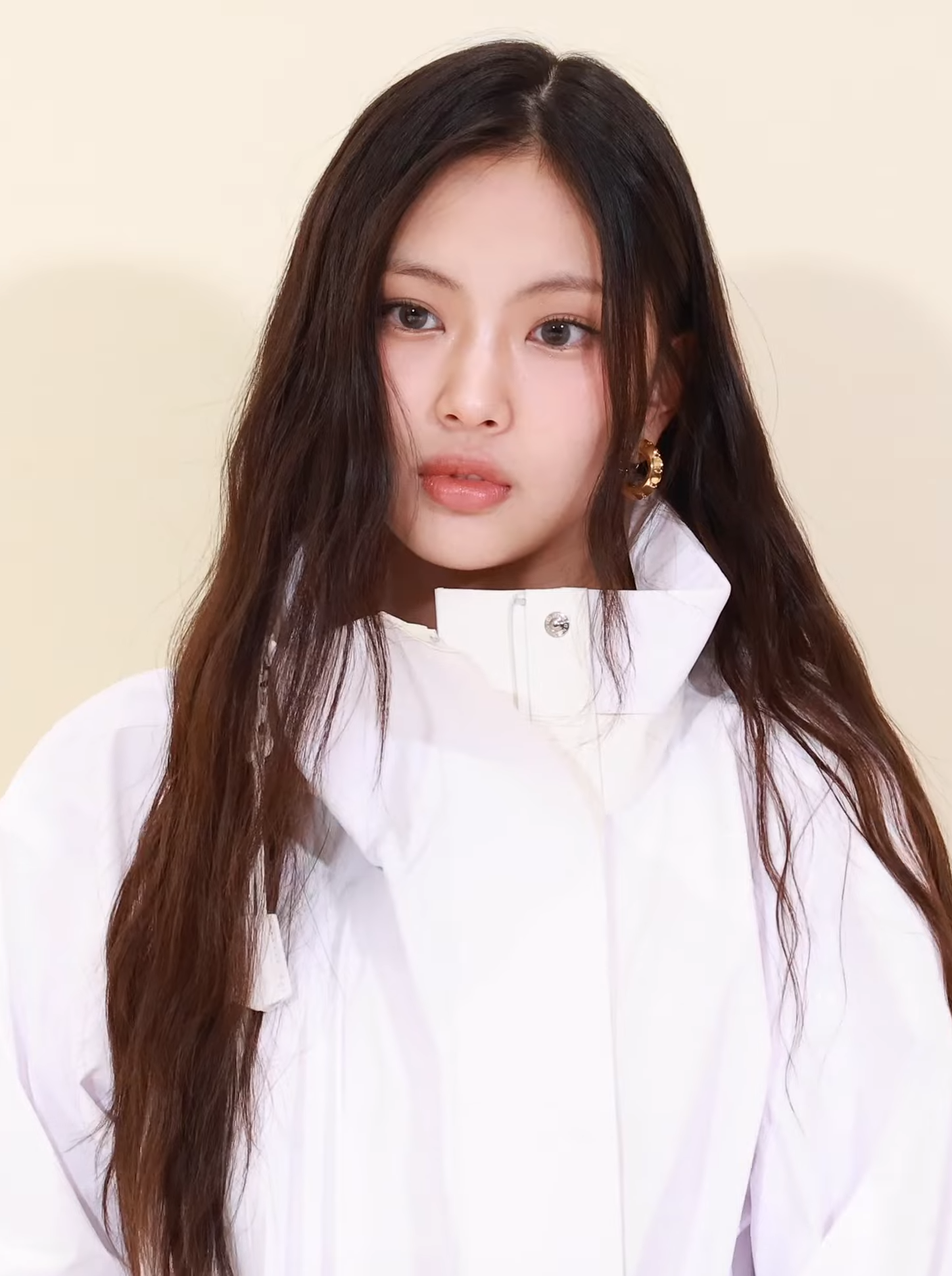
- Hyein in July 2024
- Born: Lee Hye-in; April 21, 2008 (age 18); Incheon, South Korea
- Occupation: Singer
- Musical career
- Genre: K-pop
- Instrument: Vocals
- Years active: 2017–present
- Label: ADOR
- Member of: NewJeans
- Formerly of: U.sso Girl; Play with Me Club

Korean name
- Hangul: 이혜인
- RR: I Hyein
- MR: I Hyein

Signature
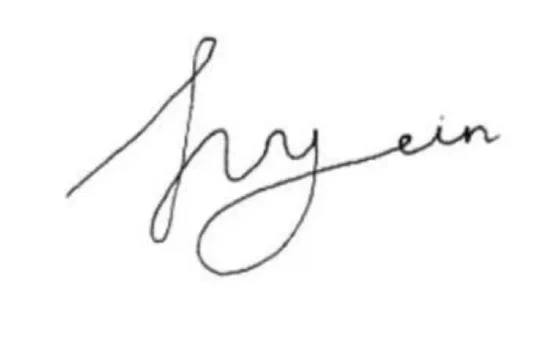

Lee Hye-in (Korean: 이혜인, [iː çein]; born April 21, 2008), known mononymously as Hyein, is a South Korean singer and former child model. She began her musical career at nine years old as a member of the South Korean children's groups U.sso Girl and Play with Me Club. She later debuted as a member of South Korean girl group NewJeans, formed by ADOR in July 2022.

== Life and career ==
=== 2008–2019: Early life and modeling career ===
Lee Hye-in was born on April 21, 2008, in Michuhol District, Incheon, South Korea. Hyein attended Munhak Elementary School, but later dropped out soon after taking the school's qualification exam. As a former child model, she worked as the 7th model for the snapback brand PRANKERS in August 2019. Hyein thereafter walked the runway at age eleven during the 2019 Mercedes Benz Fashion Week held at Moscow, Russia in October. In December, she won the grand prize for the 2019 Little Look of the Year, a competition for child models. Hyein has since served as an advertising model for brands including Tara & Co. and Emart's No Brand.

=== 2017–2021: U.SSO Girl and Play With Me Club ===
In July 2017, Hyein was announced as a member of the children's girl group U.sso Girl alongside Rora of Babymonster under the stage name U.Jeong. The group debuted on November 7, 2017, with their first digital single, "Go Go Sing". Hyein would later depart from the group sometime in 2018.

On January 11, 2019, she was revealed as a member of the children's co-ed group Play with Me Club. The group made their debut with the first digital single, "Let's Play", on December 16, 2020. During this period, she made an appearance on the EBS children's television show Live Talk! Talk! Boni Hani! as a member of the co-ed dance group SIXDANCE. Hyein, along with fellow member Chang-hyeon, graduated from the group in May 2021.

=== 2022–present: Debut in NewJeans and solo activities ===
On July 1, 2022, ADOR teased the launch of their first girl group, NewJeans, by posting three animated videos of the numbers "22", "7", and "22" on their social media accounts, fueling speculation that content would be released on 22 July. Hyein debuted alongside the group with the surprise-released music video for their debut single "Attention" on July 22, 2022, without any prior promotion or information regarding the group's lineup.

In February 2024, Hyein featured along with singer Wonsun Joe on the track "Shh.." from The Winning, the sixth extended play by singer-songwriter IU.

== Endorsements ==
On December 30, 2022, Louis Vuitton announced Hyein as one of their new global house ambassadors, becoming the youngest ambassador for the brand at 14 years old. She has also attended Paris Fashion Week representing Louis Vuitton. In April 2023, Hyein became the youngest cover girl of Harper's Bazaar Korea.

== Discography ==
=== Charted songs ===
List of charted songs, showing year released, selected chart positions, and name of the album
Title	Year	Peak chart positions	Album
Title	Year	KOR	Album
"Shh.." (IU featuring Hyein, Wonsun Joe and Patti Kim)	2024	20	The Winning

== Videography ==
=== Music videos ===
Title	Year	Director(s)	Ref.
As featured artist
"Shh.." (IU featuring Hyein, Wonsun Joe and Special Narration by Patti Kim)	2024	Hwang Soo-ah	

=== Music video appearances ===
Year	Title	Artist(s)	Ref.
2019	"Give Me Dat"	Argon	

== Filmography ==
=== Hosting ===
Year	Title	Notes	Ref.
2023	K-pop Super Live	with Gong Myung and Yuna of Itzy	
