= New Jeans (EP) =

2022 EP by NewJeans

- Digital cover

EP by NewJeans
- Released: August 1, 2022
- Recorded: 2022
- Studios: Hybe Studio (Yongsan, Seoul)
- Genres: Synth-pop; R&B
- Length: 12:47
- Languages: Korean; English
- Label: ADOR
- Producers: 250; Park Jin-su

NewJeans chronology
New Jeans (2022)	OMG (2023)

Singles from New Jeans
- 1. "Attention" Released: July 22, 2022; 2. "Hype Boy" Released: July 23, 2022; 3. "Cookie" Released: August 1, 2022

New Jeans is the debut extended play (EP) by the South Korean girl group NewJeans. It was released on August 1, 2022, by ADOR, a subsidiary of Hybe Corporation. Produced by Min Hee-jin, 250, and Park Jin-su, the EP draws from synth-pop and R&B and infuses elements of musical styles from the 1990s and 2000s decades. The songs "Attention", "Hype Boy", and "Cookie" were released as singles.

Music critics generally complimented the EP's musical styles and considered it a solid debut effort. Rolling Stone ranked it among the best albums of 2022 in their year-end list. In South Korea, New Jeans debuted at number one on the Circle Album Chart and has achieved a Million certification from the Korea Music Content Association. It additionally charted in Croatia, Germany, Hungary, and Japan.

== Background and release ==
The lineup for NewJeans was reportedly finalized in March 2022 under ADOR (All Doors One Room), a subsidiary record label of Hybe Corporation. The group was created under the direction of Min Hee-jin, a former visual director at SM Entertainment and chief brand officer (CBO) at Hybe's predecessor, Big Hit Entertainment. On July 22, 2022, "Attention" and its music video were released without prior announcements regarding the group's lineup. The single was followed by the announcement of their debut self-titled extended play (EP), which contains four tracks and two of which would be released as further singles.

Pre-orders for the EP opened on July 25. "Hype Boy" was released as the second single on July 23, with a 50-second clip revealing the members and four additional music videos customized for each member being released on the same day. Two days later, a music video for the track "Hurt" was released. On August 1, the group released the final music video the third single, "Cookie", following the digital release of the EP on the same day. The EP was distributed physically on August 8. Min explained that having three singles for a four-track EP was because of how "confident" she was in the music and how "it's such a pity how it's the lead singles that get all the attention".

== Musical styles ==
New Jeans incorporates musical styles of the 1990s and 2000s decades, predominantly pop and R&B. Kim Do-heon, a music critic writing for the Korean Dispatch, characterized the EP as a coalition of synth-pop and hip hop/R&B. The songs are instrumented by mellow beats and atmospheric synthesizers. "Attention" has a minimal 2000s R&B instrumentation with key changes between major and minor chords. "Hype Boy" is an upbeat future bass song with elements of 1990s R&B and moombahton in its rhythms. "Cookie" is a pop-R&B track with pulsing synthesizers, a fluttering bassline, and faint 808 kicks; its bridge incorporates Jersey club elements. The closing song, "Hurt", is a mellow R&B track backed by groovy drums.

== Critical reception ==
Professional ratings
Review scores
Source	Rating
IZM	3/5 stars
NME	3/5 stars

Carmen Chin of NME gave three out of five stars, stating that "with their musical ability and the label's bold artistic vision, NewJeans have managed to lay some solid groundwork for a bright future as trailblazers". Joshua Minsoo Kim of Pitchfork wrote, "NewJeans' launch has been the most elaborate campaign in K-pop this year", stating that the EP is "a plush and stylish collection of '90s and '00s-indebted R&B production". In December 2022, Rolling Stone ranked it as number 46 in their list of best 100 albums of 2022, describing the EP as "a unique sound and fresh visual component, leaning heavily into a Nineties pop aesthetic that suits this band well and guarantees replays".

Year-end lists for New Jeans
Publication	List	Rank	Ref.
Billboard	The 25 Best K-Pop Albums of 2022	15	
EBS	Top 100 Korean Albums (2004–2023)	Included	
Idology	The 20 Albums of the Year	Included	
Rolling Stone	The 100 Best Albums of 2022	46	
Uproxx	The Best K-pop Albums of 2022	Included	

== Awards and nominations ==
Awards and nominations for New Jeans
Year	Ceremony	Award	Result	Ref.
2022	Asian Pop Music Awards (Note: Hosted by the Hong Kong Asia Pacific International Group and Sunway Records, the Asian Pop Music Awards bases its winners on the "Asian Pop Music Chart" which opened in September 2019.)	Best New Artist (Overseas)	Nominated	
2022	Melon Music Awards	Album of the Year	Nominated	
2023	Circle Chart Music Awards	New Artist of the Year – Physical	Nominated	
2023	Korean Music Awards	Album of the Year	Nominated	
2023	Korean Music Awards	Best K-pop Album	Won	

== Commercial performance ==
On July 28, it was announced that pre-orders of New Jeans exceeded 444,000 copies, breaking the record for the highest number of stock pre-orders for any Korean girl group debut album in history. After the release of New Jeans, all tracks immediately ranked high on major South Korean domestic music charts such as Melon, Genie, Bugs!, and Vibe. On the first day of its release, the EP achieved 2.06 million streams on Spotify Korea, the most for any K-pop girl group that debuted in 2022. Singles "Attention" and "Hype Boy" placed in the top two of Korean Spotify's Daily Top Songs chart for two consecutive days, while "Cookie" ranked third on the second day of release. Overseas, the three singles managed to enter the real-time charts of Line Music, Japan's largest music site. On the first day of release alone, New Jeans sold over 262,800 combined copies, breaking the record set by labelmate Le Sserafim's Fearless, which recorded 175,000 first-day album sales in May earlier same year.

== Promotion ==
Following the release of New Jeans, NewJeans held a live countdown on YouTube on the same day to introduce the extended play and communicate with their fans. On August 4, they held their debut stage on Mnet's M Countdown, where they performed all three lead singles. The promotions continued through Music Bank on August 5, where they performed "Attention", and Inkigayo on August 7, where the quintet performed "Attention" and "Cookie". A pop-up store on The Hyundai, Seoul to commemorate the release of New Jeans is scheduled to open from August 11 to 31 and sell official merchandise of New Jeans and ADOR.

== Track listing ==
Track listing for New Jeans
No.	Title	Lyrics	Music	Arrangement	Length
1.	"Attention"	Gigi; Duckbay; Danielle	250; Duckbay	250	3:00
2.	"Hype Boy"	Gigi; Ylva Dimberg; Hanni	250; Ylva Dimberg	250	2:59
3.	"Cookie"	Gigi; Ylva Dimberg	Park Jin-su; Ylva Dimberg	Park Jin-su	3:55
4.	"Hurt"	Gigi; Amanda Lundstedt	250; Amanda Lundstedt	250	2:57
Total length:					12:52

== Charts ==
=== Weekly charts ===
Weekly chart performance
Chart (2022–2023)	Peak position
Croatian International Albums (HDU)	7
German Albums (Offizielle Top 100)	91
Hungarian Albums (MAHASZ)	36
Japanese Albums (Oricon)	12
Japanese Combined Albums (Oricon)	10
Japanese Hot Albums (Billboard Japan)	22
Nigerian Albums (TurnTable)	94
South Korean Albums (Circle)	1
US Heatseekers Albums (Billboard)	6
US Top Album Sales (Billboard)	32
US World Albums (Billboard)	6

=== Monthly charts ===
Monthly chart performance
Chart (2022)	Peak position
Japanese Albums (Oricon)	35
South Korean Albums (Circle)	4

=== Year-end charts ===
Year-end chart performance
Chart (2022)	Position
South Korean Albums (Circle)	34
South Korean Albums (Circle) Weverse Album	60

Year-end chart performance
Chart (2023)	Position
South Korean Albums (Circle)	49

== Certifications ==
Certifications
Region	Certification	Certified units/sales
South Korea (KMCA)	Million	1,243,690
South Korea (KMCA) Weverse Album	2× Platinum	544,743

== Release history ==
Release history
Region	Date	Format	Label	Ref.
Various	August 1, 2022	Digital download; streaming	ADOR	
Various	August 8, 2022	CD	ADOR	
United States	March 23, 2023	CD	ADOR; Geffen	
