= Attention (NewJeans song) =

2022 single by NewJeans

Single by NewJeans

from the EP New Jeans
- Language: Korean; English
- Released: July 22, 2022
- Genre: R&B; pop; new jack swing
- Length: 3:00
- Label: ADOR
- Composers: 250; Duckbay
- Lyricists: Gigi; Duckbay; Danielle
- Producer: 250

NewJeans singles chronology
"Attention" (2022)	"Hype Boy" (2022)

Music video
- "Attention" on YouTube

"Attention" is the debut single by the South Korean girl group NewJeans. The music video for the song was surprise-released on July 22, 2022, and the track was released for download and streaming as part of their self-titled debut EP in August 2022. Written and composed by 250, Duckbay, Gigi, and the group member Danielle, "Attention" is a pop and R&B track with elements of late-1990s and early-2000s music such as house music on a new jack swing beat, and it incorporates dynamic key changes between the major and minor chords. Its lyrics are about the sensations of young infatuation.

Music critics generally praised the catchy production of "Attention". The single appeared on lists of the best songs of 2022, including those by Billboard, IZM, Music Y, NME, and Teen Vogue. Commercially, "Attention" peaked atop the South Korean Circle Digital Chart, reached number 54 on the Billboard Global 200, and charted in Argentina, New Zealand, Singapore, Taiwan, and Vietnam. The single received certifications in Japan and South Korea.

== Background and release ==
On July 22, NewJeans released the music video for "Attention" as a surprise release, without previously revealing the members' identities or the group concept. The choreography video was released on the same day, and followed swiftly by the announcement of the quintet's debut self-titled extended play, which was confirmed to contain four tracks, including two additional singles.

== Composition ==
With a length of 2 minutes and 58 seconds, "Attention" switches between the major and minor chords. Built on minimal instrumentation, the track incorporates influences of pop and R&B from the late-1990s and early-2000s in its beats, which evoke the rhythms of new jack swing and house music. The production includes vocal samples and sounds of applause, and the hook features sounds of chimes. In the refrain, all five members harmonize vocally. NewJeans' member Danielle participated in writing lyrics for the track.

== Reception ==
Professional ratings
Review scores
Source	Rating
IZM	3.5/5 stars

Jang Jun-hwan wrote for IZM that "it aims for a comfortable listening experience, but will never be boring" and "satisfies the concept and significance of debut in many ways". Carmen Chin of NME thought that the track has a "groovy je ne sais quoi" and described its beat as "bustling".

"Attention" on select listicles
Publication	List	Rank	Ref.
Billboard	The 25 Best K-Pop Songs of 2022	6	
CNN Philippines	CNN Philippines' 25 Favorite K-pop Songs of 2022	No order	
Cosmopolitan	The 15 Best K-Pop Songs of 2022	6	
Dazed	The best K-pop tracks of 2022	7	
Idology	Top 20 Songs of 2022	No order	
IZM	10 Best Songs of 2022	No order	
Music Y	Best Songs of 2022	1	
NME	The 25 best K-pop songs of 2022	7	
Teen Vogue	The 79 Best K-Pop Songs of 2022	No order	
Teen Vogue	21 Best K-Pop Music Videos of 2022	No order	
YouTube Korea	Top 10 Most Popular YouTube Videos in 2022	2	

=== Commercial performance ===
"Attention" debuted at number one and number two on the Billboard's South Korea Songs and on the Circle Digital Chart, respectively. It peaked at number one on the Circle Digital Chart in the chart issue dated August 14–20. Overseas, it debuted at number 26 on the RMNZ Hot Singles on the chart issue dated August 8, 2022. On the Global 200 the song peaked at 54. In Singapore and Vietnam the song debuted at eleven.

== Accolades ==
Awards and nominations for "Attention"
Year	Ceremony	Award	Result	Ref.
2022	MAMA Awards	Song of the Year	Nominated	
2022	MAMA Awards	Best Dance Performance Female Group	Nominated	
2023	Circle Chart Music Awards	New Artist of the Year – Digital	Won	
2023	Circle Chart Music Awards	Artist of the Year – Global Digital Music (August)	Nominated	
2023	Golden Disc Awards	Digital Bonsang	Won	
2023	Golden Disc Awards	Digital Daesang	Nominated	
2023	Korean Music Awards	Song of the Year	Nominated	
2023	Korean Music Awards	Best K-pop Song	Won	

Music program awards for "Attention"
Program	Date	Ref.
M Countdown	August 18, 2022	
Music Bank	August 19, 2022	
Show! Music Core	August 20, 2022	
Inkigayo	August 21, 2022	
Inkigayo	August 28, 2022	

Melon Popularity Award
Award	Date (2022)	Ref.
Weekly Popularity Award	August 22	

== Credits and personnel ==
Credits adapted from the EP's photo book.

Locations

- Recorded and engineered at Hybe Studio
- Mixed at Chapel Swing Studios, Valley Glen

Credits and personnel

- 250 – producer, composition, instrumental, programming, vocal directing
- Duckbay (Cosmos Studios, Stockholm) – composition, lyrics, background vocals
- Gigi – lyrics
- Danielle – lyrics
- Jungwoo Jang – vocal directing
- NewJeans – background vocals
- Emily Kim – background vocals
- Hyejin Choi – engineering
- Tony Maserati – mixing
- David K. Younghyun – mixing

== Charts ==
=== Weekly charts ===
Weekly chart performance
Chart (2022–2023)	Peak position
Argentina (Argentina Hot 100)	78
Global 200 (Billboard)	54
Indonesia (Billboard)	22
Japan Heatseekers (Billboard Japan)	3
Japan Streaming (Billboard Japan)	72
Malaysia (Billboard)	19
New Zealand Hot Singles (RMNZ)	26
Singapore (Billboard)	7
Singapore (RIAS)	7
South Korea (Billboard)	1
South Korea (Circle)	1
Taiwan (Billboard)	25
Vietnam (Vietnam Hot 100)	8

=== Monthly charts ===
Monthly chart performance
Chart (2022)	Peak position
South Korea (Circle)	1

=== Year-end charts ===
Year-end chart performance for "Attention"
Chart	Year	Position
South Korea (Circle)	2022	22
South Korea (Circle)	2023	9
South Korea (Circle)	2024	44
South Korea (Circle)	2025	116

== Certifications ==
Certifications
Region	Certification	Certified units/sales
New Zealand (RMNZ)	Gold	15,000^{‡}
Streaming
Japan (RIAJ)	Platinum	100,000,000^{†}
South Korea (KMCA)	2× Platinum	200,000,000^{†}
^{‡} Sales+streaming figures based on certification alone.^{†} Streaming-only figures based on certification alone.

== Release history ==
Release history
Region	Date	Format	Label	Ref
Various	July 22, 2022	Music video	ADOR	
Various	August 1, 2022	Digital download; streaming	ADOR	
