= I Am (Ive song) =

Single by Ive

from the album I've Ive
- Language: Korean; English
- Released: April 10, 2023
- Studio: Ingrid Studio (Seoul); 821 Sound (Seoul)
- Length: 3:03
- Label: Starship; Kakao; Columbia
- Composers: Ryan S. Jhun; Kristin Marie Skolem; Audun Agnar Guldbrandsen; Eline Noelia Myreng
- Lyricist: Kim Eana

Ive singles chronology
"Kitsch" (2023)	"I Am" (2023)	"Wave" (2023)

Music video
- "I Am" on YouTube

"I Am" is a song recorded by South Korean girl group Ive for their first studio album I've Ive. It was released as the album's lead single by Starship Entertainment on April 10, 2023. Its lyrics were written by Kim Eana whilst composition was handled by Ryan S. Jhun, Kristin Marie Skolem, Audun Agnar Guldbrandsen, and Eline Noelia Myreng.

"I Am" received critical acclaim for its production and vocals, and it was named by several publications as one of the best K-pop songs of the year. It experienced commercial success in South Korea and topped the Circle Digital Chart for six weeks, becoming Ive's fourth number-one single. It also reached the top ten in Hong Kong, Japan, Malaysia, Singapore, Taiwan, and Vietnam. The song has been certified platinum for streaming in South Korea, and went on to receive several accolades including Song of the Year at the Hanteo Music Awards. Ive promoted the song with live performances on various weekly South Korean music programs, including M Countdown, Music Bank, Show! Music Core, and Inkigayo. As of August 2026, the accompanying music video for the song has reached over 400 million views on Starship Entertainment's YouTube channel and remains their most-viewed video.

== Background and release ==
On March 16, 2023, Starship Entertainment announced that Ive would be releasing their first studio album, titled I've Ive, on April 10. It was also announced that the album would contain 11 tracks, including a lead single written by Kim Eana and composed by Ryan S. Jhun. On April 2, the track listing was released with "I Am" announced as the lead single. On April 8, the music video teaser was released. A day later, the highlight medley teaser video was released. The song was released alongside the album and its music video on April 10.

== Composition ==
"I Am" was written by Kim Eana, composed and arranged by Ryan S. Jhun, Kristin Marie Skolem, and Audun Agnar Guldbrandsen, with Eline Noelia Myreng participating in the composition. It was described as a song with lyrics with "strong message" about "having a self-reliant and confident attitude in life and to discover a different me from yesterday". "I Am" was composed in the key of E minor, with a tempo of 122 beats per minute.

== Critical reception ==
On NME's midyear list of the best K-pop songs of 2023, Ivana E. Morales wrote that the song "is pop greatness helmed by an ascending vocal prowess that gets more splendid as it goes" and called it "a declaration of the group’s sonic realm". Dazed ranked it at number 19 in their list of the Top 50 best K-pop tracks of 2023, and Grammy named it one of the 15 K-pop songs that defined 2023. Billboard ranked "I Am" number 3 in their list of the 25 Best K-pop Songs of 2023, praising its production and remarked "both song and group feel absolutely unstoppable — so when the sextet sings 'I’m on my way' on the pre-chorus, you have no choice but to believe them."

Year-end lists for "I Am"
Critic/Publication	List	Rank	Ref.
Billboard	The 25 Best K-Pop Songs of 2023	3	
Dazed	The 50 best K-pop tracks of 2023	Placed	
NME	The 25 best K-pop songs of 2023	24	
Paste	The 20 Best K-pop Songs of 2023	3	

== Commercial performance ==
"I Am" debuted at number two on South Korea's Circle Digital Chart in the chart issue dated April 9–15, 2023, and ascended to number one the following week. The song became their third song to achieve a perfect all-kill (PAK). The song also debuted at number one on the Billboard South Korea Songs in the chart issue dated April 22, 2023. In Japan, the song debuted at number 17 on the Billboard Japan Hot 100 in the chart issue dated April 19, 2023. On the Oricon Combined Singles, the song debuted at number 21 in the chart issue dated April 24, 2023.

In Singapore, "I Am" debuted at number ten on the RIAS Top Streaming Songs, and number seven on the RIAS Top Regional Songs in the chart issue dated August 19–25, 2022. The song also debuted at number ten on the Billboard Singapore Songs on the chart issue dated April 22, 2023. In Vietnam, the song debuted at number 19 on the Billboard Vietnam Hot 100 in the chart issue dated April 20, 2023. In Malaysia, the song debuted at number ten on the Billboard Malaysia Songs in the chart issue dated April 22, 2023. In Hong Kong, the song debuted at number seven on the Billboard Hong Kong Songs in the chart issue dated April 22, 2023. In Taiwan, the song debuted at number five on the Billboard Taiwan Songs in the chart issue dated April 22, 2023.

In the United States, "I Am" debuted at number seven on the Billboard World Digital Song Sales in the chart issue dated April 22, 2023. In New Zealand, the song debuted at number 12 on the RMNZ Hot Singles in the chart issue dated April 17, 2023, ascending to number 11 in the following week. In United Kingdom, the song debuted at number nine on the OCC UK Indie Breakers in the chart issue dated April 14–20, 2023. Globally, the song debuted at number 52 on the Billboard Global 200, and number 30 on the Billboard Global Excl. U.S in the chart issue dated April 22, 2023. It ascended to number 11 on the Billboard Global Excl. U.S. in the following week.

== Promotion ==
Prior to the release of I've Ive, on April 10, 2023, Ive held a press conference to introduce the album and its songs, including "I Am", and to communicate with their fans. A day later, it was announced that Rei would be suspending her activities temporarily due to poor health. The group subsequently performed without Rei for the remaining of their promotion starting with four music programs in the first week: Mnet's M Countdown in April 13, KBS's Music Bank in April 14, MBC's Show! Music Core on April 15, and SBS's Inkigayo on April 16. On the second week, they performed on five music programs: SBS M's The Show on April 18, M Countdown on April 20, Music Bank on April 21, and Show! Music Core on April 22, and Inkigayo on April 23, where they won first place for all appearances.

== Accolades ==
Awards and nominations for "I Am"
Award ceremony	Year	Category	Result	Ref.
Asian Pop Music Awards	2023	Top 20 Songs of the Year (Overseas)	Won	
Asian Pop Music Awards	2023	Best Dance Performance (Overseas)	Nominated	
Asian Pop Music Awards	2023	Best Music Video (Overseas)	Nominated	
Asian Pop Music Awards	2023	Song of the Year (Overseas)	Nominated	
Circle Chart Music Awards	2024	Artist of the Year – Digital	Won	
Circle Chart Music Awards	2024	Artist of the Year – Global Streaming	Won	
Circle Chart Music Awards	2024	Artist of the Year – Streaming Unique Listeners	Won	
Golden Disc Awards	2024	Best Digital Song (Bonsang)	Won	
Golden Disc Awards	2024	Song of the Year (Daesang)	Nominated	
Hanteo Music Awards	2024	Song of the Year (Daesang)	Won	
MAMA Awards	2023	Song of the Year	Shortlisted	
MAMA Awards	2023	Best Music Video	Nominated	
MAMA Awards	2023	Best Dance Performance – Female Group	Nominated	
Melon Music Awards	2023	Song of the Year	Shortlisted	

Music program awards for "I Am"
Program	Date (9 total)	Ref.
Inkigayo	April 23, 2023	
Inkigayo	June 18, 2023	
Inkigayo	June 25, 2023	
M Countdown	April 20, 2023	
M Countdown	April 27, 2023	
Music Bank	April 21, 2023	
Show! Music Core	April 22, 2023	
Show Champion	April 19, 2023	
The Show	April 18, 2023	

== Charts ==
=== Weekly charts ===
Weekly chart performance for "I Am"
Chart (2023)	Peak position
Argentina (Argentina Hot 100)	69
Canada (Canadian Hot 100)	93
Global 200 (Billboard)	21
Hong Kong (Billboard)	3
Japan (Japan Hot 100)	10
Japan Combined Singles (Oricon)	10
Malaysia (Billboard)	6
New Zealand Hot Singles (RMNZ)	11
Philippines (Billboard)	24
Singapore (RIAS)	3
South Korea (Circle)	1
Taiwan (Billboard)	3
UK Indie Breakers (OCC)	9
US World Digital Song Sales (Billboard)	6
Vietnam (Vietnam Hot 100)	10

=== Monthly charts ===
Monthly chart performance for "I Am"
Chart (2023)	Position
South Korea (Circle)	1

=== Year-end charts ===
2023 year-end chart performance for "I Am"
Chart (2023)	Position
Global 200 (Billboard)	152
Japan (Japan Hot 100)	98
South Korea (Circle)	3

2024 year-end chart performance for "I Am"
Chart (2024)	Position
South Korea (Circle)	26

2025 year-end chart performance for "I Am"
Chart (2025)	Position
South Korea (Circle)	55

== Certifications ==
Streaming certifications for "I Am"
Region	Certification	Certified units/sales
South Korea (KMCA)	2× Platinum	200,000,000^{†}
^{†} Streaming-only figures based on certification alone.

== Release history ==
Release history for "I Am"
Region	Date	Format	Label
Various	April 10, 2023	Digital download; streaming	Starship; Kakao

== See also ==
- List of Billboard South Korea Songs number ones
- List of Circle Digital Chart number ones of 2023
- List of Inkigayo Chart winners (2023)
- List of M Countdown Chart winners (2023)
- List of Music Bank Chart winners (2023)
- List of Show! Music Core Chart winners (2023)
- List of Show Champion Chart winners (2023)
- List of The Show Chart winners (2023)
