= I've Ive =

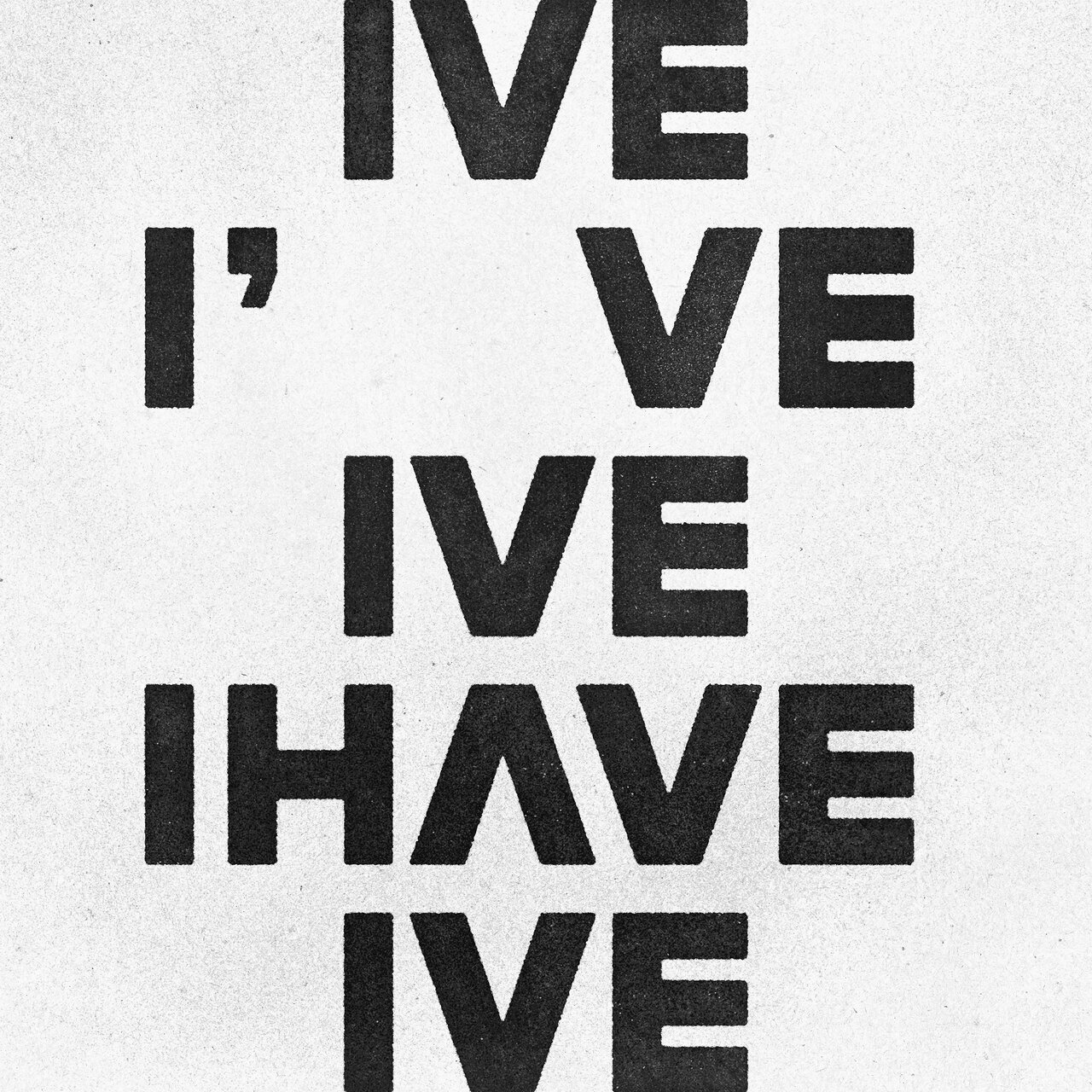
- Digital cover

Studio album by Ive
- Released: April 10, 2023
- Length: 34:17
- Languages: Korean; English
- Labels: Starship; Kakao; Columbia

Ive chronology
After Like (2022)	I've Ive (2023)	Wave (2023)

Singles from I've Ive
- 1. "Kitsch" Released: March 27, 2023; 2. "I Am" Released: April 10, 2023

I've Ive is the first studio album by South Korean girl group Ive. It was released by Starship Entertainment on April 10, 2023. The album contains 11 tracks, including the pre-release single "Kitsch" and lead single "I Am".

The album debuted at number one on the Circle Album Chart with over 1.3 million copies sold in its first week of release, becoming Ive's fourth number-one album. It has since been certified million by the Korea Music Content Association (KMCA) for selling 1,000,000 units. For the album, Ive was awarded Album of the Year at the 2023 Melon Music Awards.

== Background and release ==
Prior to the announcement of the album, the group performed the unreleased songs "Blue Blood" and "Not Your Girl" at their first concert, the Prom Queens, on February 11 and 12, 2023. It was later reported by Korea JoongAng Daily that both tracks were from Ive's upcoming studio album, which would be released in April. On March 16, Starship Entertainment announced that Ive would be releasing their first studio album, titled I've Ive, on April 10. It was also announced that the album would contain eleven tracks, including a lead single written by Kim Eana and composed by Ryan S. Jhun, with Seo Ji-eum, who wrote the group's past lead singles, also participating in songwriting on the album.

Starship Entertainment explained that the title I've Ive "refers to Ive's name and carry the meaning of [the group] presenting themselves in the 'Ive way'" in the album.

On March 20, the music video teaser for "Kitsch" was released, alongside confirmation that the song would be released on March 27, ahead of the album, with the promotional schedule being released three days later. "Kitsch" and its music video were released as scheduled on March 27. On April 2, the track listing was released with "I Am" announced as the lead single. On April 8, the music video teaser for "I Am" was released, followed by the highlight medley teaser video the following day. The album was released alongside the music video for "I Am" on April 10.

== Critical reception ==
Professional ratings
Review scores
Source	Rating
IZM	3/5 stars

I've Ive received generally positive reviews from critics. Erica Campbell of NME praised the album as "a luxurious, confident and commanding collection of K-pop". Crystal Bell writing for Nylon named I've Ive as the best K-pop album of 2023, describing it as "sparkling pop served with a petulant pout". Han Seonghyeon of IZM wrote a mixed review where he gave the album three out of five stars, praising the tracks "Lips", "Mine", and "Heroine" but criticizing the "obligatory" rap parts in "Next Page", "Kitsch", and "Hypnosis".

Year-end lists for I've Ive
Critic/Publication	List	Rank	Ref.
Billboard	The 25 Best K-Pop Albums of 2023	25	
NME	The best albums of 2023	47	
Paste	The 20 Best K-pop Albums of 2023	6	

== Accolades ==
Awards and nominations for I've Ive
Award ceremony	Year	Category	Result	Ref.
Asian Pop Music Awards	2023	Best Album of the Year (Overseas)	Nominated	
MAMA Awards	2023	Album of the Year	Nominated	
Melon Music Awards	2023	Album of the Year	Won	
Melon Music Awards	2023	Millions Top 10	Won	

== Commercial performance ==
I've Ive was released to commercial success; it was certified Million by the Korea Music Copyright Association and became the group's fourth number-one album on the Circle Album Chart after Eleven (2021), Love Dive (2022), and After Like (2022). I've Ive sold over 1.3 million album copies in the first week of release. According to the International Federation of the Phonographic Industry (IFPI)'s Global Music Report for 2023, I've Ive was the twentieth most-consumed album across all formats, and the seventeenth best-selling album worldwide, having sold 1.7 million units. (Note: The IFPI Global Albums chart ranks, in order, the albums that generated the most money globally across streaming, download, and physical record sales (combined) in a calendar year. The Global Album Sales Chart measures global unit sales across all physical formats, as well as full album downloads.)

== Track listing ==
I've Ive track listing
No.	Title	Lyrics	Music	Arrangement	Length
1.	"Blue Blood"	Seo Ji-eum	Nick Hahn; Sophia Brenan; Elle Campbell	Nick Hahn	2:48
2.	"I Am"	Kim Eana	Ryan S. Jhun; Kristin Marie Skolem; Audun Agnar Guldbrandsen; Eline Noelia Myreng	Ryan S. Jhun; Audun Agnar Guldbrandsen; Kristin Marie Skolem	3:04
3.	"Kitsch"	Lee Seu-ran; Hwang Hyun (MonoTree); Gaeul; Rei	Ryan S. Jhun; Lise Reppe; Audun Agnar Guldbrandsen; Kyle Joseph Faulkner; Tea Carpenter; Emily Harbakk; Stally; Pateko	Ryan S. Jhun; Audun Agnar Guldbrandsen; Stally; Pateko	3:15
4.	"Lips"	Exy; Sohlhee	Ryan S. Jhun; Alexander Pavelich; Lauren Keen; Sean Davidson; Andre Davidson; Lars Rosness; Benjamin Pinkus	Ryan S. Jhun; Lars Rosness; Benjamin Pinkus	3:01
5.	"Heroine"	Yujin	Ryan S. Jhun; Hilda Stenmalm; Rasmus Budny; Shy Martin	Ryan S. Jhun; Rasmus Budny	2:51
6.	"Mine"	Wonyoung	Ryan S. Jhun; Lauritz Emil Christiansen; Jeppe London Bilsby; Celine Svanbäck	Ryan S. Jhun; Lauritz Emil Christiansen; Jeppe London Bilsby	3:10
7.	"Hypnosis" (섬찟)	Seo Jeong-a; Gaeul; Rei	Lauren Aquilina; Sophia Brenan; Fin Dow Smith; Christopher Smith; Corey Sanders; Adriaan Caldas De Barros; Elof Loelv	Starsmith; Risc; Elof Loelv	2:27
8.	"Not Your Girl"	Hwang Hyun (MonoTree); Gaeul; Rei	Ryan S. Jhun; Scott Russell Stoddart; Torine Michelle Bjaland; Anna Anita Jaskiv	Ryan S. Jhun; Scott Russell Stoddart	3:22
9.	"Next Page" (궁금해)	Hwang Hyun (MonoTree); Gaeul; Rei	Ryan S. Jhun; Polar; Megan Ashworth	Ryan S. Jhun; Polar	3:19
10.	"Cherish"	Lee Seu-ran	Ryan S. Jhun; Sofia Quinn; Dewain Whitmore; Louis Schoorl	Ryan S. Jhun; Louis Schoorl	3:15
11.	"Shine with Me"	Wonyoung	Ryan S. Jhun; Erike Gustaf Smaaland; Kristoffer Chaka Bwanasi-Tømmerbakke; Alida Garpestad Peck	Ryan S. Jhun; Erike Gustaf Smaaland; Kristoffer Chaka Bwanasi-Tømmerbakke	3:45
Total length:					34:17

== Charts ==
=== Weekly charts ===
Weekly chart performance for I've Ive
Chart (2023)	Peak position
Croatian International Albums (HDU)	39
Japanese Albums (Oricon)	5
Japanese Combined Albums (Oricon)	2
Japanese Hot Albums (Billboard Japan)	10
South Korean Albums (Circle)	1
UK Album Downloads (Official Charts)	97
US Top Current Album Sales (Billboard)	57
US World Albums (Billboard)	7

=== Monthly charts ===
Monthly chart performance for I've Ive
Chart (2023)	Peak position
Japanese Albums (Oricon)	5
South Korean Albums (Circle)	2

=== Year-end charts ===
Year-end chart performance for I've Ive
Chart (2023)	Position
Global Albums (IFPI)	20
Japanese Albums (Oricon)	91
South Korean Albums (Circle)	19

== Certifications ==
Certifications and sales for I've Ive
Region	Certification	Certified units/sales
South Korea (KMCA)	Million	1,653,686
Summaries
Worldwide	—	1,700,000

== Release history ==
Release history for I've Ive
Region	Date	Format	Label
Various	April 10, 2023	Digital download; streaming	Starship; Kakao
South Korea	April 10, 2023	CD	Starship; Kakao
United States	April 10, 2023	CD	Starship; Columbia

== See also ==
- Ive discography
