= Perfect all-kill =

South Korean music chart achievement

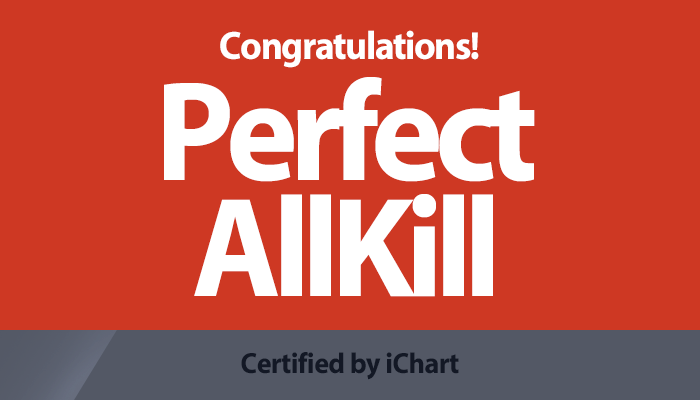
Perfect all-kill certificate

A perfect all-kill (Korean: 퍼펙트 올킬; abbreviated as PAK) occurs when a song simultaneously places at number one on the real-time, daily, and weekly components of iChart, which tracks South Korean music streaming services. iChart is run by Instiz Corporation, the South Korean web entertainment publisher that also operates the Instiz web forum.

The term "perfect all-kill" was first used when the song "Nagging" by IU featuring Seulong ranked at number one on all Korean music charts in June 2010. Although Instiz iChart was launched in March 2010, it does not list 2010 records. The artist that holds the record for the highest number of songs to achieve a PAK is IU with 21 songs. The song with the most hourly PAKs is "Golden" by Ejae, Audrey Nuna, and Rei Ami as the group Huntrix with 1,484 PAKs. "Good Goodbye" by Hwasa holds the record for a solo act with 750 PAKs.

== iChart ==
The Instiz iChart aggregates the real-time, daily, and weekly rankings of major music streaming services in South Korea, including Melon, Genie, Bugs!, Vibe, Flo, and YouTube Music, producing its own real-time and weekly rankings based on points given to songs. The users can also visit the source agencies' websites directly to compare rankings. The records may be accessed by the public for three months.

=== History ===
Before 2015, the iChart aggregated scores from ten music service providers: Melon, Mnet, Bugs!, Olleh, Soribada, Genie, Naver, Daum, Cyworld, and Monkey3. In February 2017, major domestic music distributors changed their streaming calculation to real-time graphics only between 12pm and 6pm. This meant that anything that was released outside of this time would not count towards the chart until 1pm the following day. In May 2017, Olleh and Monkey3 were excluded from the Instiz iChart ranking calculation and Naver Music's score doubled. In February 2019, Flo was added to iChart. In October 2019, Mnet discontinued its service and merged with Genie, and was later removed from the chart. Naver Music has also been removed and replaced with Naver VIBE.

In May 2020, Melon made some changes to its real-time ranking calculation. The chart changed from rankings based on hourly usage per song to a chart calculated based on the number of unique listeners. Streams and downloads from the last 24 hours were calculated instead of the last hour.

=== Mechanic ===
The iChart gathers the data and attributes points to each song. The Instiz iChart attributes bonus points for more popular and widely used platforms than others. It applies a multiplier to the accumulated points that a song gets from certain charts. This multiplier only applies on daily charts. The following table shows the maximum points for every chart.

Streaming service	Multiplier	Points	Description
Melon	6x	12,480	the largest of the major digital music providers in South Korea, which has a market share of around 40% online subscribers. It provides real-time (24Hits) and daily (Daily Top 100) rankings. Its criteria are 40% streaming (for accounts verified by Korean phone number) and 60% downloads for the past 24 hours.
Genie	4x	9,120	a subsidiary of KT Corporation, is the 2nd largest music service provider in South Korea and has 24% market share. It provides real-time (Top 100 Realtime) and daily (Top 100 Daily) rankings. Its chart calculation is based on 50% streaming and 50% downloads. Genie chart freezes from 1 AM KST until 7 AM KST daily but the streams are still counted during this period.
Vibe	2x	3,360	created by Naver in partnership with YG, and accounts for 10% market share. It provides real-time (Today Top 100) chart data.
Flo	No daily chart	5,040	a relatively new service provider that was created by SK Telecom in partnership with JYP, SM, and Big Hit. It accounts for 18% market share. It provides real-time data only.
YouTube Music	Weekly chart only	5,040	developed by YouTube and held the third-largest market share in Korea (19.22%). It provides weekly data only.
Bugs!	1x	4,080	a Korean digital music streaming service and accounts for 5% market share. It provides real-time (Song Chart Realtime) and daily (Song Chart Daily) rankings. Similar to Genie, its chart also freezes from 1 AM KST until 7 AM KST.

== Related terms ==
Other "all-kill" categories on the Instiz iChart include Real-time All-Kill (RAK) and Certified All-Kill (CAK). RAK is achieved when a song becomes number one on all iChart real-time charts while CAK is achieved when a song becomes number one on all iChart real-time and daily charts. For a song to achieve a PAK, it needs to become number one on iChart weekly chart as well.

== Achievements ==
=== Top ten songs with the most hourly perfect all-kills ===
The following table lists the top ten songs with the highest number of perfect all-kills (in hours), from 2010 to present.

Rank	Song	Artist	Album	PAK (hours)	Year	Ref.
1	"Golden"	Huntrix	KPop Demon Hunters	1,484	2025	
2	"Good Goodbye"	Hwasa	Non-album single	750	2025	
3	"Ditto"	NewJeans	OMG	655	2023	
4	"Dynamite"	BTS	Be	610	2020	
5	"Celebrity"	IU	Lilac	462	2021	
6	"I Am"	Ive	I've Ive	359	2023	
7	"Love Wins All"	IU	The Winning	339	2024	
8	"Any Song"	Zico	Random Box	330	2020	
9	"Supernova"	Aespa	Armageddon	317	2024	
10	"APT."	Rosé and Bruno Mars	Rosie	282	2024	
Since January 21, 2026

=== Artists with the most songs to achieve a perfect all-kill ===
The following table lists the top artists with the highest number of songs that have achieved a perfect all-kill from 2010 to present.

Rank	Artist	Number	Songs	Ref.
1	IU	21	"Nagging"; "Good Day"; "The Story Only I Didn't Know"; "You & I"; "The Red Shoes"; "Friday"; "My Old Story"; "Twenty-Three"; "Through the Night"; "Can't Love You Anymore"; "Palette"; "Autumn Morning"; "Bbibbi"; "Love Poem"; "Blueming"; "Give You My Heart"; "Eight"; "Celebrity"; "Lilac"; "Strawberry Moon"; "Love Wins All"	
2	Big Bang	7	"Tonight"; "Blue"; "Loser"; "Let's Not Fall in Love"; "Fxxk It"; "Flower Road"; "Still Life"	
3	Ive	6	"After Like"; "Kitsch"; "I Am"; "Baddie"; "Rebel Heart"; "Bang Bang"	
4	Twice	4	"Cheer Up"; "TT"; "Knock Knock"; "Yes or Yes"	
4	BTS	4	"Fake Love"; "Boy with Luv"; "Dynamite"; "Butter"	
4	I-dle	4	"Tomboy"; "Nxde"; "Queencard"; "Fate"	
5	Busker Busker	3	"Cherry Blossom Ending"; "If You Really Love Me"; "Love, At First"	
5	Blackpink	3	"Whistle"; "Ddu-Du Ddu-Du"; "How You Like That"	
5	Bolbbalgan4	3	"Some"; "Travel"; "Workaholic"	
5	G-Dragon	3	"That XX"; "Untitled, 2014"; "Too Bad"	
5	AKMU	3	"How Can I Love the Heartbreak, You're the One I Love"; "Love Lee"; "Paradise of Rumors"	
Since May 2, 2026
