= Rei (singer) =

Japanese singer and rapper (born 2004)

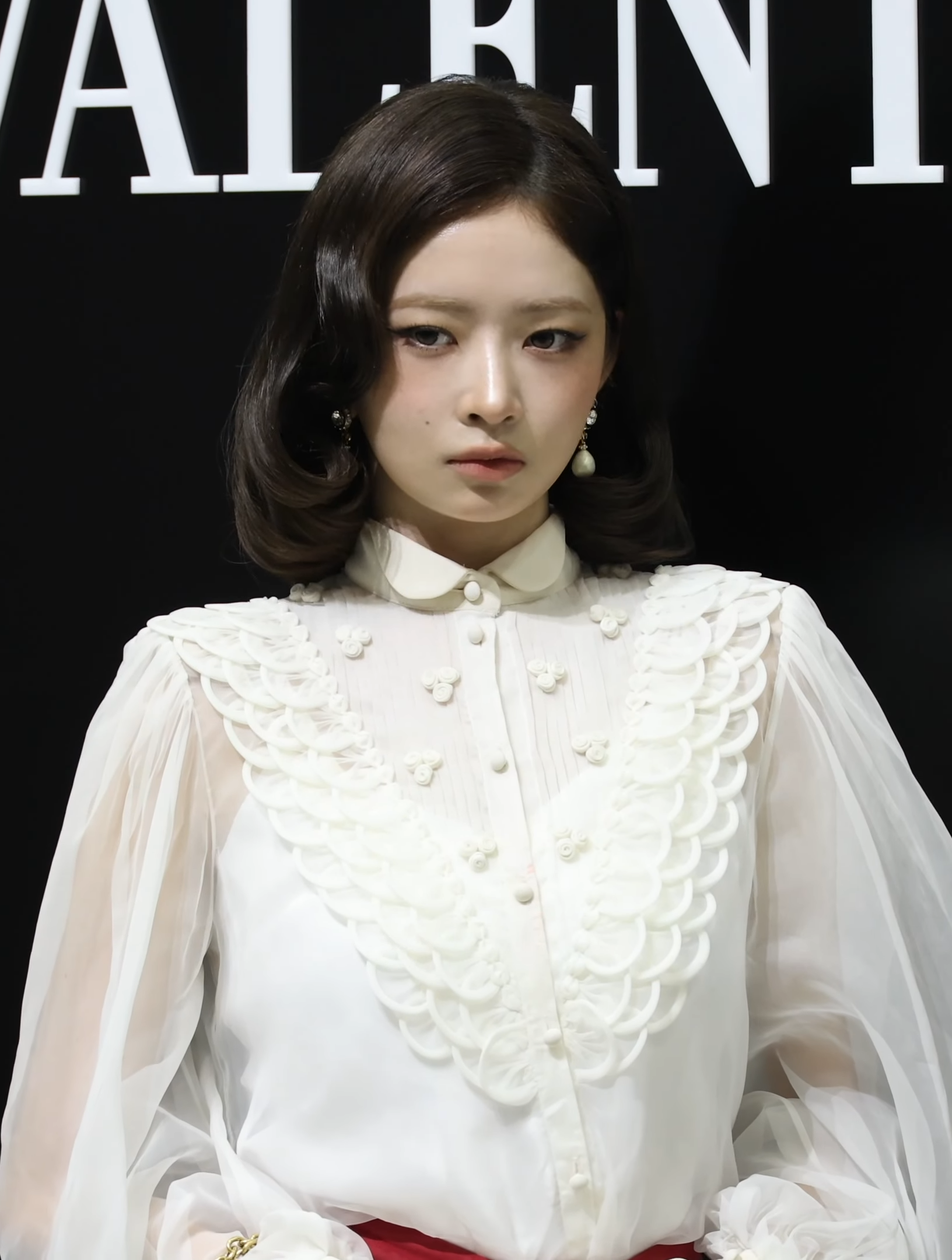
- Rei in March 2026
- Born: Naoi Rei; February 3, 2004 (age 22); Nagoya, Aichi, Japan
- Education: School of Performing Arts Seoul
- Occupations: Singer; rapper
- Musical career
- Genres: K-pop; J-pop
- Instrument: Vocals
- Years active: 2021–present
- Label: Starship
- Member of: Ive

Japanese name
- Kanji: 直井 怜
- Revised Hepburn: Naoi Rei

Rei Naoi (Japanese: 直井 怜, Hepburn: Naoi Rei; born February 3, 2004), known mononymously as Rei (Korean: 레이; Japanese: レイ), is a Japanese singer and rapper based in South Korea. She is a member of the South Korean girl group Ive, under Starship Entertainment.

== Early life ==
Rei was born on February 3, 2004, in Nagoya, Aichi, Japan.

In 2018, she joined Starship Entertainment after passing at the Loen Friends Global Audition in Japan where she performed Red Velvet's "Happiness." Rei's audition caught the judges' attention with her distinct voice. Later that year, she came to Korea and started training for approximately three and a half years. During her training period, Rei attended the School of Performing Arts Seoul, where she was a student in the applied music department. She officially graduated on February 10, 2022.

== Career ==
=== 2021–present: Debut with Ive and solo activities ===
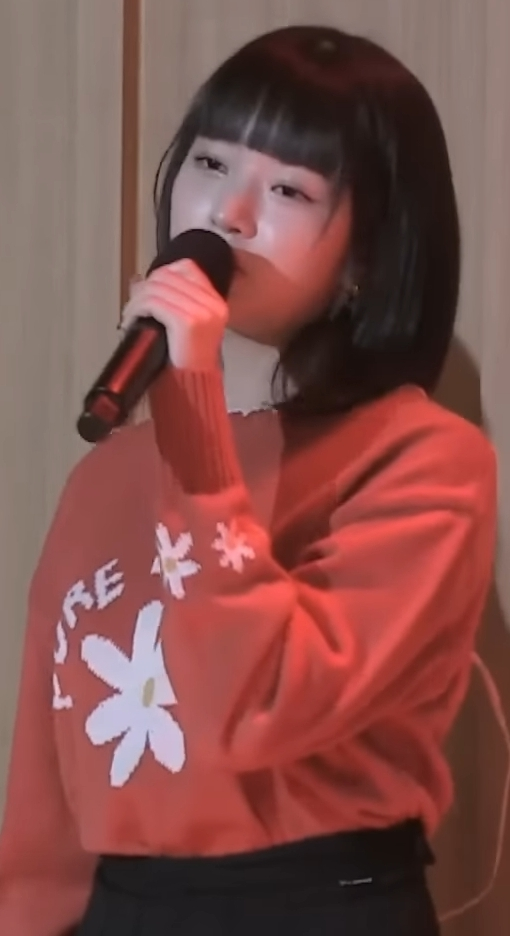
Rei in December 2021

On November 6, 2021, Starship Entertainment revealed Rei as one of the six members of their new girl group, Ive. Rei was the fifth member to be introduced as the group's rapper and vocalist. On December 1, Rei officially debuted as a member of Ive with the release of their single album, Eleven, led by the single of the same name.

On April 5, 2022, Ive released their second single album, Love Dive, on which Rei participated in writing the track titled "Royal". On August 22, Ive released their third single album, After Like, led by the lead single of the same name, on which Rei is again credited as a writer. In 2023, she wrote four tracks for the group's first studio album, I've Ive, namely "Kitsch", "Hypnosis", "Not Your Girl", and "Next Page". In April 2023, she went on a hiatus from Ive activities to focus on her health. Her condition improved and she returned at the end of May.

In April 2025, Rei led Ive's viral "폭주기니" (Pokju Ggini, Rampaging Guinea Pig) challenge from the chorus of "Attitude" off their third mini album Ive Empathy, where her initiating time-lagged arm-waving dance likened to hyperactive guinea pigs sparked a massive global frenzy on TikTok, Instagram Reels, and YouTube Shorts, earning her the nickname "대장기니" (Captain Ggini). Her spoiler videos amassed over 38.6 million TikTok views, solidifying her "all-time trendsetter" status following past viral hits like "리본피스" (Ribbon Dress) and "콩순이 포즈" (Kongsoon Pose).

On May 29, Rei served as a host at the Asia Star Entertainer Awards, marking her first time hosting a major awards ceremony. On October 5, Rei attended the Valentino Spring/Summer 2026 fashion show during Paris Fashion Week alongside fellow Ive member Liz. On October 15, Rei won the "Best Trend Leader" award at the TikTok Awards Korea 2025 held in Seoul. The award was reported to be related to her participation in a viral TikTok challenge promoting Ive's song "Attitude". In November 2025, Rei released a cover of the song "Baby Powder", which was filmed in Paris during her European schedule, which included attending the Valentino Spring/Summer 2026 fashion show.

== Other ventures ==
=== Endorsements ===
In September 2022, Rei appeared in a pictorial for Arena Homme Plus's September issue, showcasing men's fashion concepts tailored to her unique style. In December 2022, she was selected as the cover model for Vogue Japan, featured in an editorial that highlighted her elegant poses and global appeal. In May 2023, Rei participated in a Cosmopolitan Korea pictorial, modelling trendy apparel and accessories with a youthful vibe. For L'Officiel Korea's Spring/Summer 2024 YK edition, she served as the cover model with her group members Liz, Gaeul and Leeseo, presenting sophisticated high-fashion looks. In May 2025, she starred as the cover model for Spur magazine in a Valentino collaboration pictorial with her group member Liz, emphasizing the brand's luxurious and modern designs. In June 2025, Rei featured on the digital cover of Dazed magazine in collaboration with lifestyle brand Opening Project for their "Portrait of Youth and Journey" pictorial. That same year, Rei appeared in Harper's Bazaar Korea for the Carlyn accessories campaign, modelling bags in chic, minimalist styling. In March 2026, she appeared in Cosmopolitan Korea, featuring Rom'u for the magazine's March issue.In May 2026, she took the cover for may issue of China magazine "Deling ".

Rei has also attended various pop-up stores and fashion events. In June 2023, she visited the Ferragamo pop-up store opening event, participating in a photocall for the brand. In October 2024, Rei attended the Swarovski pop-up store event, adding prominence to the brand's promotions. On March 21, 2025, she was present at Versace's opening event at Shinsegae Department Store's main branch in Seoul. On March 26, 2025, Rei joined the Polo Ralph Lauren "Polo Playback" launch photocall, highlighting the brand's casual elegance. On April 17, 2025, she attended the Stand Oil shoes pop-up event, modelling footwear in a fashion-forward setup. On June 4, 2025, Rei participated in Tod's "Italian Summer" pop-up, aligning with the luxury lifestyle theme. On June 12, 2025, Rei attended the "Opening Project x Setter Pop-up Store Opening Commemorative Photowall" event held in Seongsu-dong, Seongdong-gu, Seoul, where she participated in a photo session as the brand's active muse to celebrate the launch of their collaboration products. In September 2025, Rei attended Luna's offline launch event for the "Grinding Conceal Butter" in Shibuya, Tokyo, appearing as the brand's ambassador and sharing her experience with the new product. On October 30, 2025, Rei attended the UGG x Sacai photocall event, blending casual and high-fashion elements.On April 16,2026, Rei attended TAMBURINS pop-up store event in Tokyofor their new perfumeOn May 1, 2026, Rei attended Miseki Seoul pop-up event in Seongsu, Seoul for their new collection

Rei has served as a brand ambassador and muse for multiple brands. In 2022, she was appointed muse for Bonajour beauty, appearing in skincare campaign visuals. That year, Rei became an exclusive model for FCMM fashion, focusing on sportswear editorials. Also in 2022, she was named Korea-Japan muse for Peach C cosmetics, starring in joint promotions. From 2024 to 2025, Rei acted as muse for Opening Project fashion, including pop-up and seasonal activities. In 2025, she was announced as Korean-Japanese ambassador for Luna makeup by AK Group. She also became Japanese muse for rom'u contact lenses brand, model for Fully Beauty, and in October 2025, the new face for Millet outdoor brand's 25FW campaign. Also, she was selected alongside fellow Ive member An Yu-jin as a promotional model for the smartphone game Pokémon Card Game Pocket, with promotional images and videos scheduled for release starting in early April. In January 2026, Rei became an ambassador for the Italian fashion house Valentino and appeared at the 2026 Haute Couture Spécula La Mundi show in Paris alongside her bandmate Liz during Haute couture fashion week. In March 2026, Rei was selected as the brand ambassador for the Korean brand Miseki Seoul. In August 2026, Rei has been announced as the new global ambassador for AGE20S.

== Discography ==
=== Singles ===
==== As featured artist ====
Title	Year	Peak chart positions	Album
Title	Year	KOR DL	Album
"Push" (Joohoney featuring Rei)	2025	42	光 (Insanity)

=== Soundtrack appearances ===
List of soundtrack appearances, showing year released, selected chart positions and album name
Title	Year	Peak chart positions	Album
Title	Year	KOR BGM	Album
"Hello"	2026	173	Dive Into You OST
"—" denotes a recording that did not chart or was not released in that region.

=== Other charted songs ===
List of other charted songs, with selected chart positions, showing year released and album name
Title	Year	Peak chart positions	Album
Title	Year	KOR DL	Album
"In Your Heart" (Note: credited to Ive, but the track is a solo by Rei)	2026	18	Revive+

=== Composition credits ===
All song credits are adapted from the Korea Music Copyright Association's database unless stated otherwise.

List of songs, showing year released, artist name, and name of the album
Title	Year	Artist	Album	Lyricist	Composer
"Royal"	2022	Ive	Love Dive	Yes	No
"After Like"	2022	Ive	After Like	Yes	No
"Not Your Girl"	2023	Ive	I've Ive	Yes	No
"Hypnosis"	2023	Ive	I've Ive	Yes	No
"Next Page"	2023	Ive	I've Ive	Yes	No
"Kitsch"	2023	Ive	I've Ive	Yes	No
"In Your Heart" (Note: Originally performed by Rei at Ive's Show What I Am World Tour.)	2026	Herself	Revive+	Yes	Yes
"Looks Can Kill"	2026	Ive	Looks Can Kill	Yes	No

== Filmography ==
=== Television shows ===
Year	Title	Role	Ref.
2025	If You Leave Home, You'll Be Pampered	Cast member	

=== Hosting ===
Year	Title	Notes	Ref.
2025	Asia Star Entertainer Awards	May 28, 2025 (Day 1)	
2025	Music Bank	with Illit's Minju	
2026	M Countdown	with Gaeul	
2026	Asia Star Entertainer Awards	May 16, 2026 (Day 1)	

== Awards and nominations ==
List of awards and nominations
Award ceremony	Year	Category	Nominee(s)	Result	Ref.
TikTok Awards Korea	2025	Best Trend Leader	Rei	Won	
