= Gaeul (singer) =

South Korean singer (born 2002)

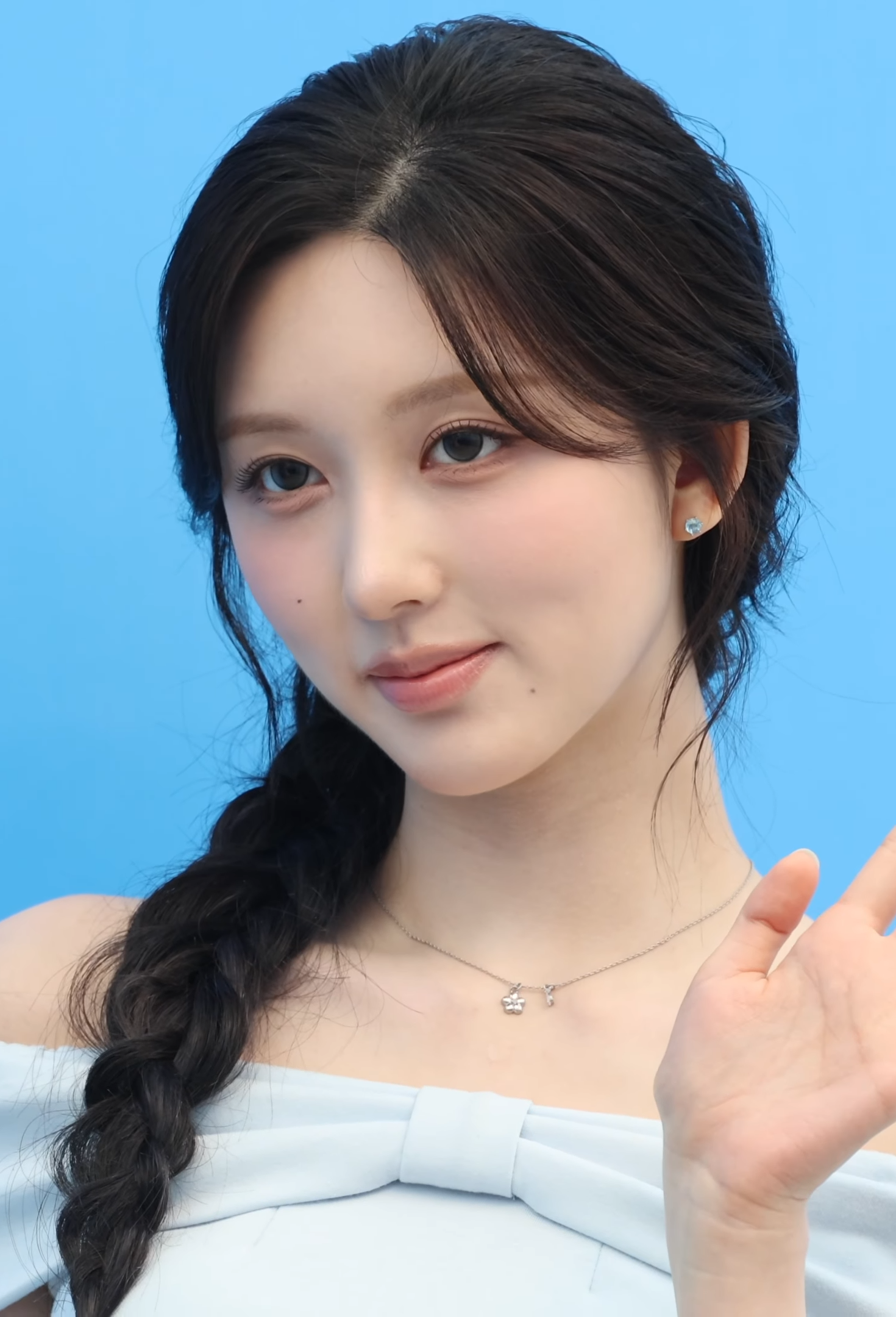
- Gaeul in 2026
- Born: Kim Ga-eul; September 24, 2002 (age 24); Incheon, South Korea
- Occupations: Singer; rapper; dancer
- Years active: 2021–present
- Musical career
- Genre: K-pop
- Instrument: Vocals
- Label: Starship
- Member of: Ive

Korean name
- Hangul: 김가을
- RR: Gim Gaeul
- MR: Kim Kaŭl

Kim Ga-eul (Korean: 김가을; born September 24, 2002), known mononymously as Gaeul, is a South Korean singer, rapper, and dancer. She is a member of the South Korean girl group Ive under Starship Entertainment.

== Early life and education ==
Kim Ga-eul was born in Bupyeong-dong, Incheon, South Korea, on September 24, 2002. She attended Bupyeong Girls' High School in Incheon.

Gaeul developed an interest in dance at an early age and participated in local youth competitions. She initially studied ballet before taking up Hip-hop dance. Her parents initially opposed her pursuing a career as a K-pop idol, but agreed to support her if she was accepted by an entertainment agency.

In April 2017 while participating in a youth dance competition in Incheon she was scouted by a representative of Starship Entertainment. She subsequently joined the agency and trained for approximately four and a half years before debuting as a member of Ive in December 2021.

== Career ==
=== 2021–present: Ive and solo activities ===
In November 2021, Gaeul was introduced as the second member of Starship Entertainment's new girl group, Ive. On December 1, she debuted as a member of Ive with the single album Eleven and its lead single of the same name.

In April 2022, Ive released their second single album Love Dive, for which Gaeul received her first songwriting credit for the rap lyrics to the B-side track "Royal".

In March 2023 Ive released the single "Kitsch", with lyrics co-written by Gaeul and fellow Ive member Rei, along with Lee Seu-ran and Hwang Hyun. Ive's first studio album, I've Ive, was released on April 10, with Gaeul contributing lyrics to the tracks "Hypnosis", "Not Your Girl", and "Next Page".

In 2025, Gaeul participated in developing the choreography for Ive's songs "TKO" and "♥beats". For "♥beats", she stated that she intended the choreography to highlight each member while reflecting the song's playful hip-hop style.

== Other ventures ==
=== Endorsements and fashion ===
In November 2022, Gaeul was featured in promotional material for Lenina's fall/winter 2022 collection, produced in collaboration with online retailer W Concept. The following month she appeared in a New Balance pictorial for the brand's backpack collection. In May 2023, she appeared in a W Korea pictorial featuring Dolce & Gabbana apparel and accessories. In October 2025, she and fellow Ive member Leeseo appeared on Allure Korea's digital cover in collaboration with Crocs. In July 2026 Roger & Gallet appointed Gaeul as a brand ambassador for China her first brand ambassador role.

Gaeul has also appeared in fashion publications. She was featured on the covers of Chicteen in December 2022, L'Officiel Singapore in April 2023, L'Officiel Korea YK Edition for its Spring/Summer 2024 issue, WWD Korea in February 2026, and the Chinese magazine Knight in April 2026. Her other editorial appearances include Elle Korea in September 2022, Esquire Korea in April 2025, and Cosmopolitan Korea.

=== Public activities ===
In April 2026, Gaeul was selected as a partner for the "2026 Reading Korea" campaign organized by the Ministry of Culture, Sports and Tourism. She participated in the campaign's launch ceremony at Starfield Library in COEX, Seoul, on April 23.

== Discography ==
=== Songs ===
List of songs, showing year released, selected chart positions and album name
| Title | Year | Peak chart positions | Album |
| Title | Year | KOR | Album |
|---|---|---|---|
| "Odd" (Note: credited to Ive, but the track is a solo by Gaeul) | 2026 | 109 | Revive+ |

=== Songwriting credits ===
All song credits are adapted from the Korea Music Copyright Association's database unless stated otherwise.

List of songs, showing year released, artist name, and name of the album
| Title | Year | Artist | Album |
|---|---|---|---|
| "Royal" | 2022 | Ive | Love Dive |
| "Not Your Girl" | 2023 | Ive | I've Ive |
| "Hypnosis" | 2023 | Ive | I've Ive |
| "Next Page" | 2023 | Ive | I've Ive |
| "Kitsch" | 2023 | Ive | I've Ive |
| "Odd" (Note: Originally performed by Gaeul at Ive's Show What I Am World Tour.) | 2026 | Herself | Revive+ |
| "Crumbs" | 2026 | Ive | Looks Can Kill |
