= List of Inkigayo Chart winners (2023) =

Inkigayo Chart winners (2023)

Highlights
- Artist(s) with most wins: NewJeans (12)
- Song with highest score: "I Am" by Ive (10,586)

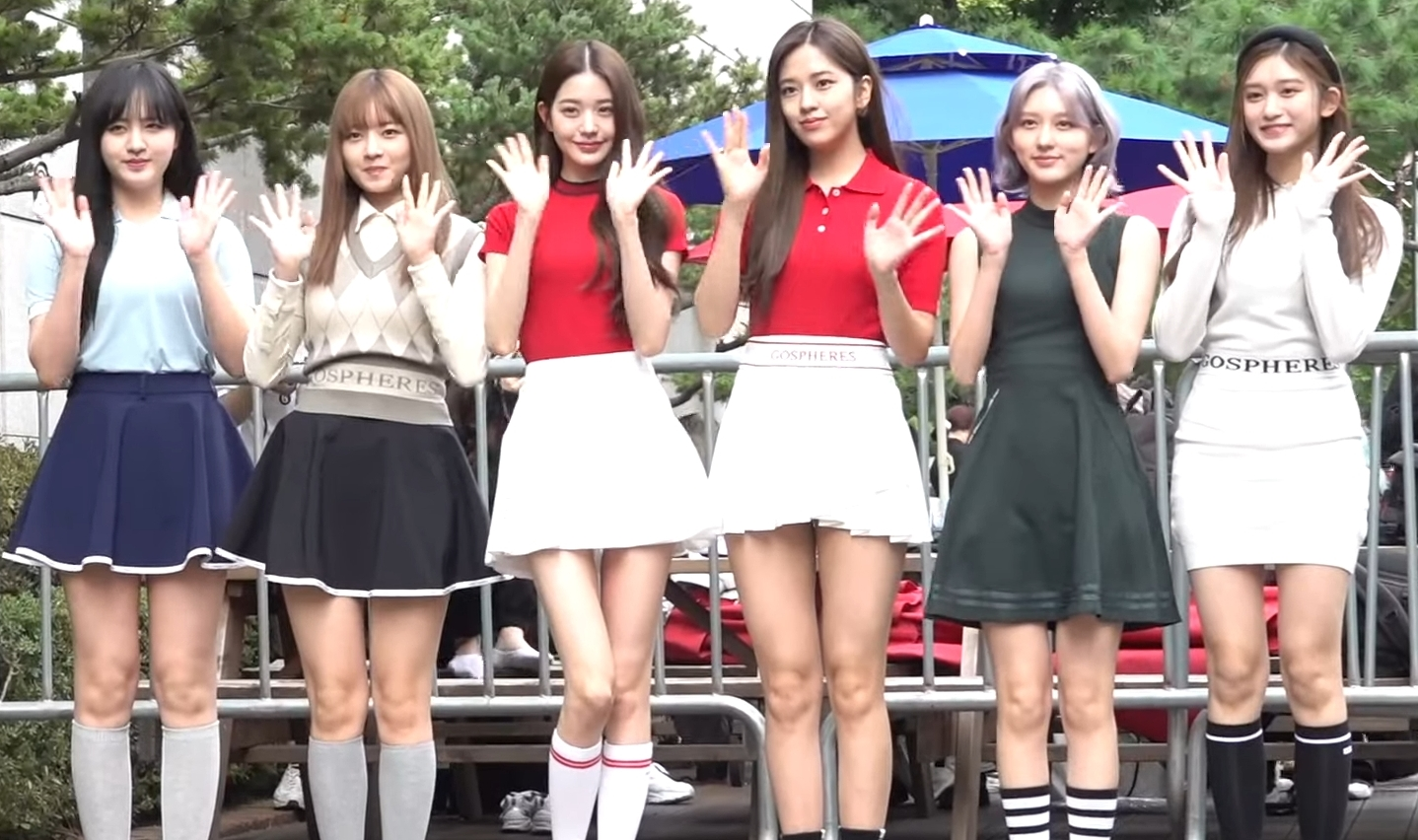
Ive's (pictured) win for "I Am" had the highest score of 2023, with 10,586 points on the April 23 broadcast. They also achieved triple crowns with both this song and "Baddie".

The Inkigayo Chart is a music program record chart on Seoul Broadcasting System (SBS) that gives an award to the best-performing single of the week in South Korea. In 2023, the chart measured digital performance in domestic online music services (worth up to 5,500 points in its ranking methodology), social media via YouTube views (3,000 points), album sales (1,000 points), network on-air time (1,000 points), viewer votes in advance of the show (500 points), and real-time voting via the Superstar X mobile app (500 points). Songs that spend three weeks at number one are awarded a triple crown and are removed from the chart and ineligible to win again.

From April 3, 2022, to April 2, 2023, actress Roh Jeong-eui, actor Seo Bum-june, and Tomorrow X Together member Choi Yeon-jun hosted the show together. The former two were replaced by Monsta X member Hyungwon and actress Kim Ji-eun starting with the April 9 broadcast. Three months later they were replaced by BoyNextDoor member Woonhak and actress Park Ji-hu.

In 2023, 25 singles reached number one on the chart, and 15 acts were awarded a first-place trophy for this feat. "I Am" by Ive had the highest score of the year, with 10,586 points on the April 23 broadcast. Nine songs collected trophies for three weeks and earned a triple crown: NewJeans's "Ditto", "OMG" and "Super Shy", (G)I-dle's "Queencard", Ive's "I Am" and "Baddie", Jisoo's "Flower", Jungkook's "Seven", and AKMU's "Love Lee". NewJean's "Ditto" was the first single to top the chart in 2023. This was followed at number one by their single "OMG". Both singles along with "Super Shy" held the top spot on the chart for three weeks each, achieving triple crowns. The group had two more singles ranked atop the chart in 2023: "Hype Boy" and "ETA". The five singles spent a total of 12 weeks in the top spot making NewJeans the artist with the most weeks at number one in 2023. Girl group STAYC achieved their first ever Inkigayo award in 2023 with their single "Teddy Bear" on the February 26 broadcast. In April, "Flower" by Blackpink's Jisoo ranked number one, becoming her first chart topper. BTS's Jungkook also had his first number one on the chart in 2023 with his single "Seven". Both singles ranked number one for three weeks and achieved triple crowns, the only such awards for solo acts in 2023.

Besides NewJeans, four other acts achieved a top ranking for more than one single on the chart in 2023. Girl group Le Sserafim had two number-one singles, "Unforgiven" and "Eve, Psyche & the Bluebeard's Wife". Aespa also reached the top spot twice in 2023 with "Spicy" and "Drama", the latter of which achieved a triple crown. In addition to Aespa, boy group Seventeen also had two singles reach the top spot in 2023: "Super" and "God of Music". Ive had four number-one singles in 2023, achieved with "Kitsch", "I Am", "Either Way" and "Baddie". "I Am" and "Baddie" went on to rank number one for three straight weeks each and achieved triple crowns.

== Chart history ==
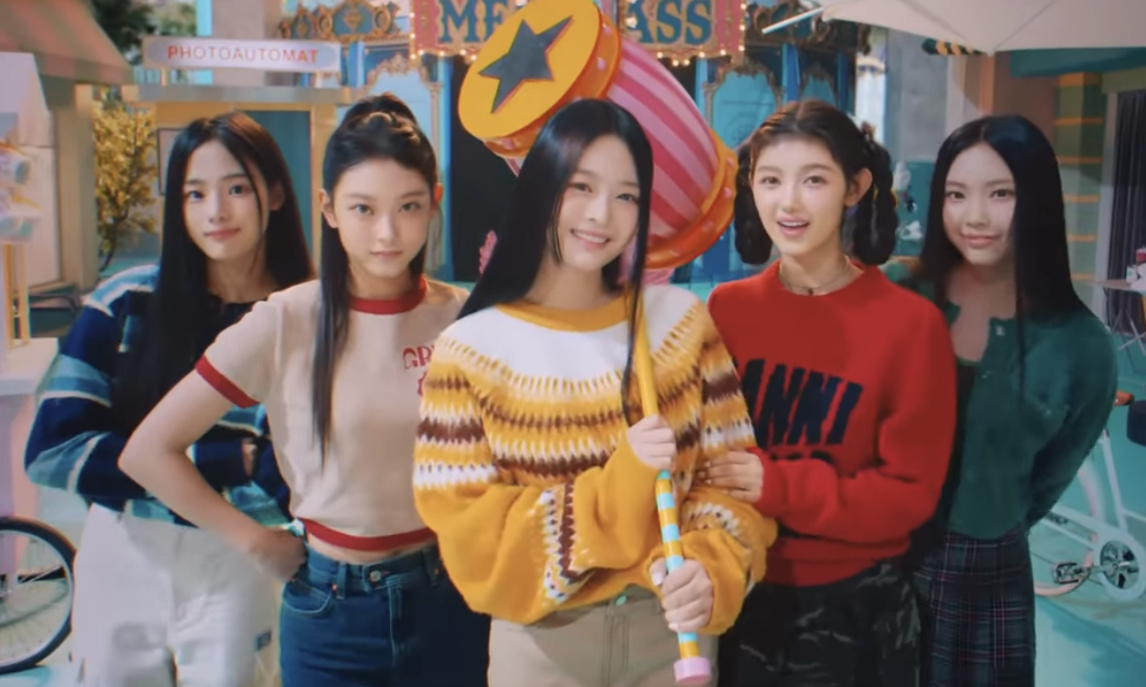
NewJeans achieved their first Inkigayo triple crowns with "Ditto", "OMG", and "Super Shy".

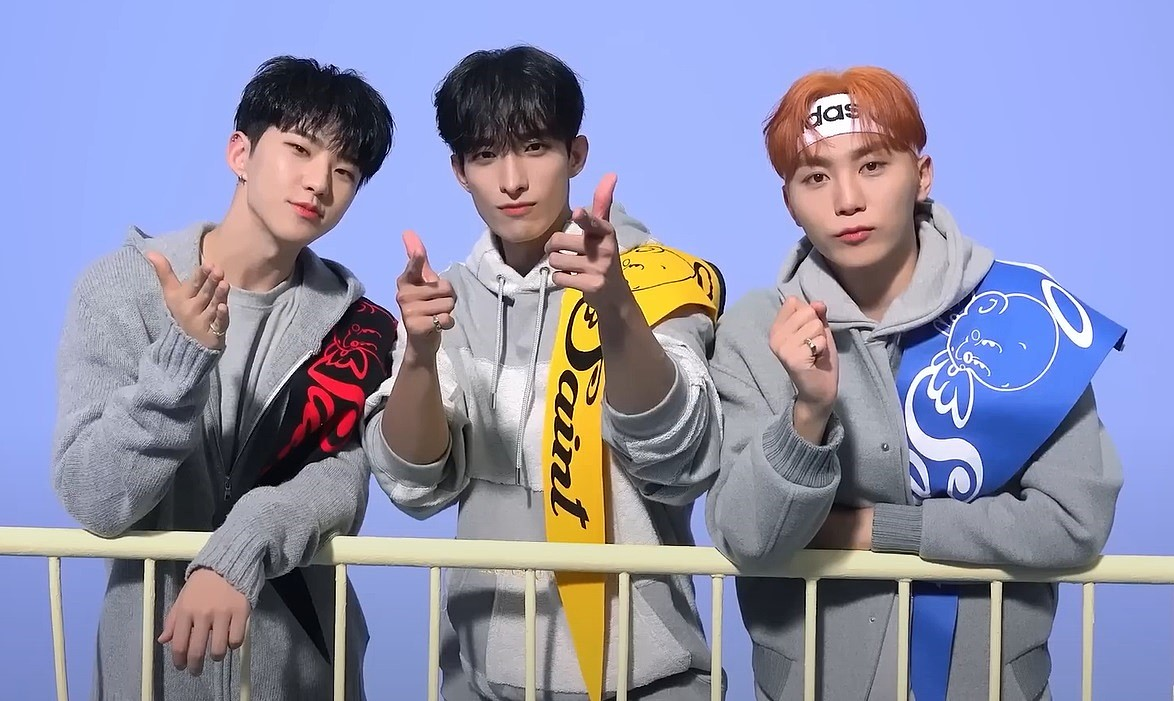
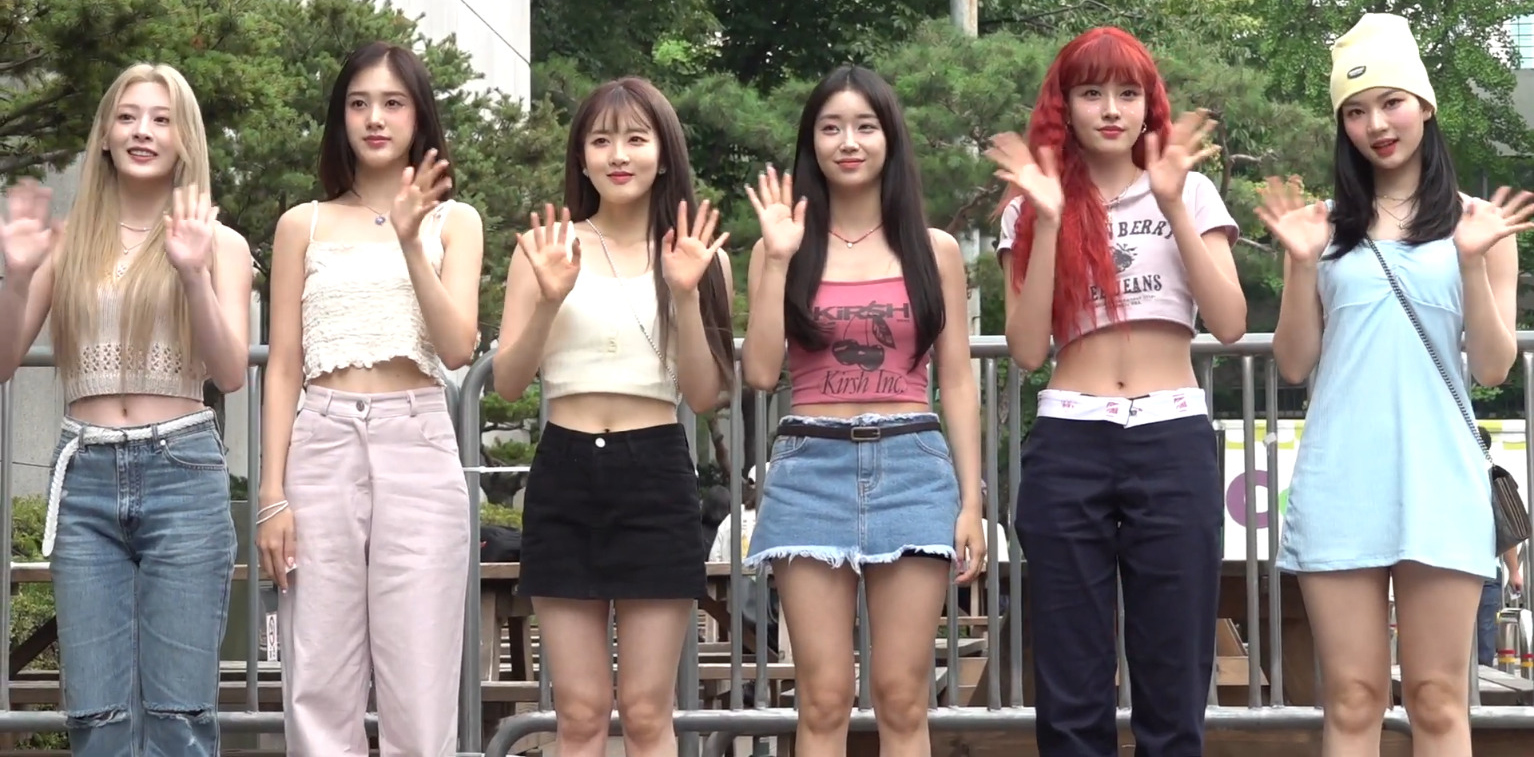
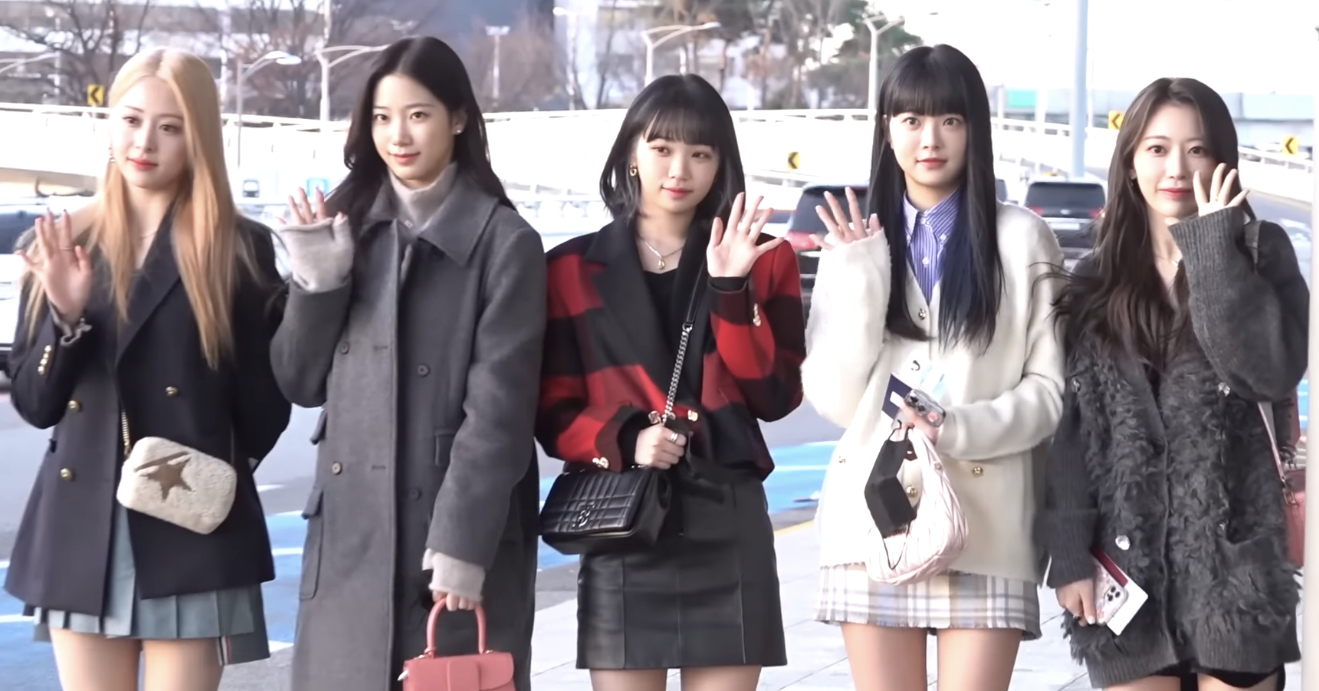
BSS (top), STAYC (middle), and Le Sserafim (bottom) received their first Inkigayo award for "Fighting", "Teddy Bear", and "Unforgiven", respectively.
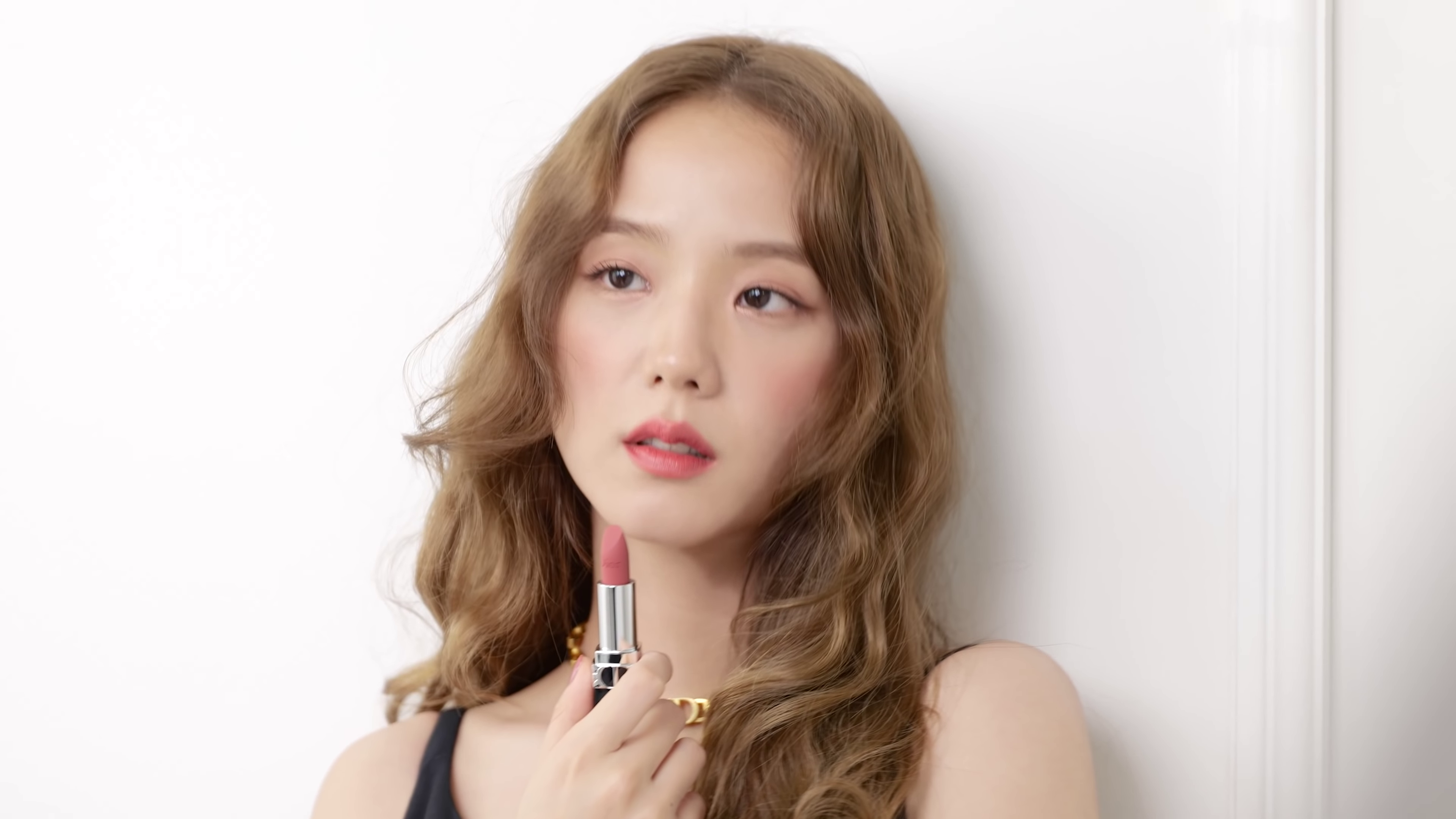
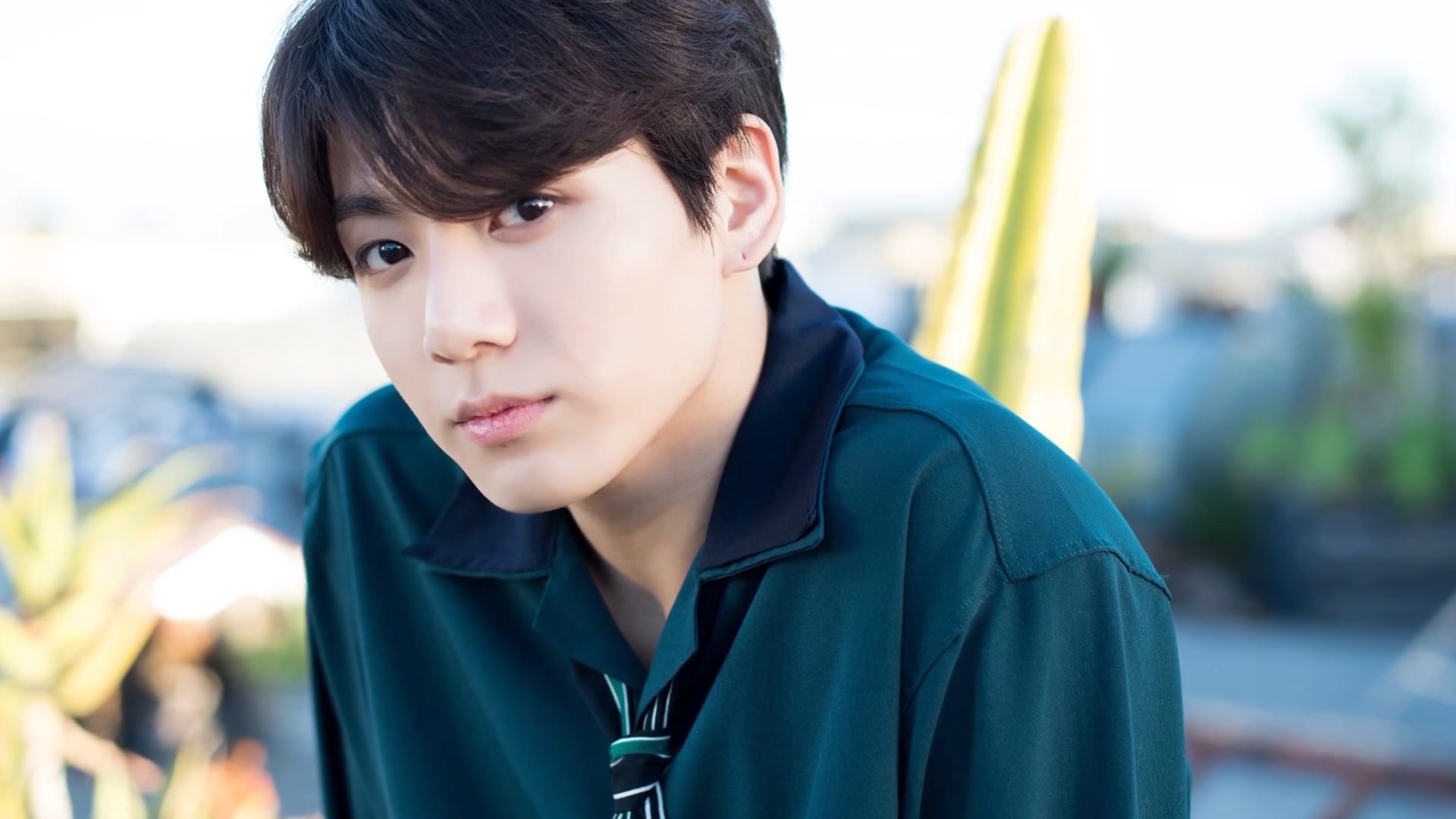
Blackpink's Jisoo (top) and BTS's Jungkook (bottom) are the only soloists who earned a triple crown during this year with their debut songs "Flower" and "Seven" respectively.

Key
†	Indicates the song achieved a triple crown
‡	Indicates the highest score of the year
—	No show was held

Chart history
Episode	Date	Artist	Song	Points	Ref.
—	January 1	No show, winner not announced			
1,166	January 8	NewJeans	"Ditto" †	6,719	
1,167	January 15	NewJeans	"OMG" †	8,795	
—	January 22	No show, winner not announced			
1,168	January 29	NewJeans	"Ditto" †	7,119	
1,169	February 5	NewJeans	"Ditto" †	6,006	
1,170	February 12	Tomorrow X Together	"Sugar Rush Ride"	7,233	
1,171	February 19	BSS	"Fighting"	8,165	
1,172	February 26	STAYC	"Teddy Bear"	5,774	
1,173	March 5	The Boyz	"Roar"	6,463	
—	March 12	No show, winner not announced			
1,174	March 19	NewJeans	"OMG" †	5,781	
1,175	March 26	NewJeans	"OMG" †	6,309	
1,176	April 2	NewJeans	"Hype Boy"	5,932	
1,177	April 9	Ive	"Kitsch"	8,273	
1,178	April 16	Jisoo	"Flower" †	8,714	
1,179	April 23	Ive	"I Am" †	10,586 ‡	
1,180	April 30	Jisoo	"Flower" †	7,902	
1,181	May 7	Seventeen	"Super"	7,884	
1,182	May 14	Le Sserafim	"Unforgiven"	8,466	
1,183	May 21	Aespa	"Spicy"	7,742	
1,184	May 28	(G)I-dle	"Queencard" †	8,779	
1,185	June 4	(G)I-dle	"Queencard" †	9,423	
1,186	June 11	(G)I-dle	"Queencard" †	8,112	
1,187	June 18	Ive	"I Am" †	6,398	
1,188	June 25	Ive	"I Am" †	6,882	
1,189	July 2	Jisoo	"Flower" †	6,961	
1,190	July 9	Shinee	"Hard"	6,666	
1,191	July 16	Le Sserafim	"Eve, Psyche & the Bluebeard's Wife"	6,463	
1,192	July 23	NewJeans	"Super Shy" †	6,994	
1,193	July 30	Jungkook	"Seven" †	8,074	
1,194	August 6	Jungkook	"Seven" †	8,379	
1,195	August 13	Jungkook	"Seven" †	8,425	
1,196	August 20	NewJeans	"Super Shy" †	6,724	
1,197	August 27	NewJeans	"Super Shy" †	7,211	
1,198	September 3	NewJeans	"ETA"	6,572	
1,199	September 10	NewJeans	"ETA"	6,111	
1,200	September 17	AKMU	"Love Lee" †	6,337	
—	September 24	No show, winner not announced			
—	October 1	No show, winner not announced			
—	October 8	No show, winner not announced			
1,201	October 15	AKMU	"Love Lee" †	6,330	
1,202	October 22	AKMU	"Love Lee" †	6,278	
1,203	October 29	Ive	"Either Way"	6,433	
1,204	November 5	Seventeen	"God of Music"	8,290	
1,205	November 12	Ive	"Baddie" †	6,292	
1,206	November 19	Ive	"Baddie" †	6,089	
1,207	November 26	Aespa	"Drama" † (Note: "Drama" ranked number one for two weeks in 2024.)	6,719	
1,208	December 3	Ive	"Baddie" †	5,731	
1,209	December 10	Taeyeon	"To. X"	5,675	
—	December 17	No show, winner not announced			
—	December 24	No show, winner not announced			
—	December 31	No show, winner not announced			
