= Kitsch (song) =

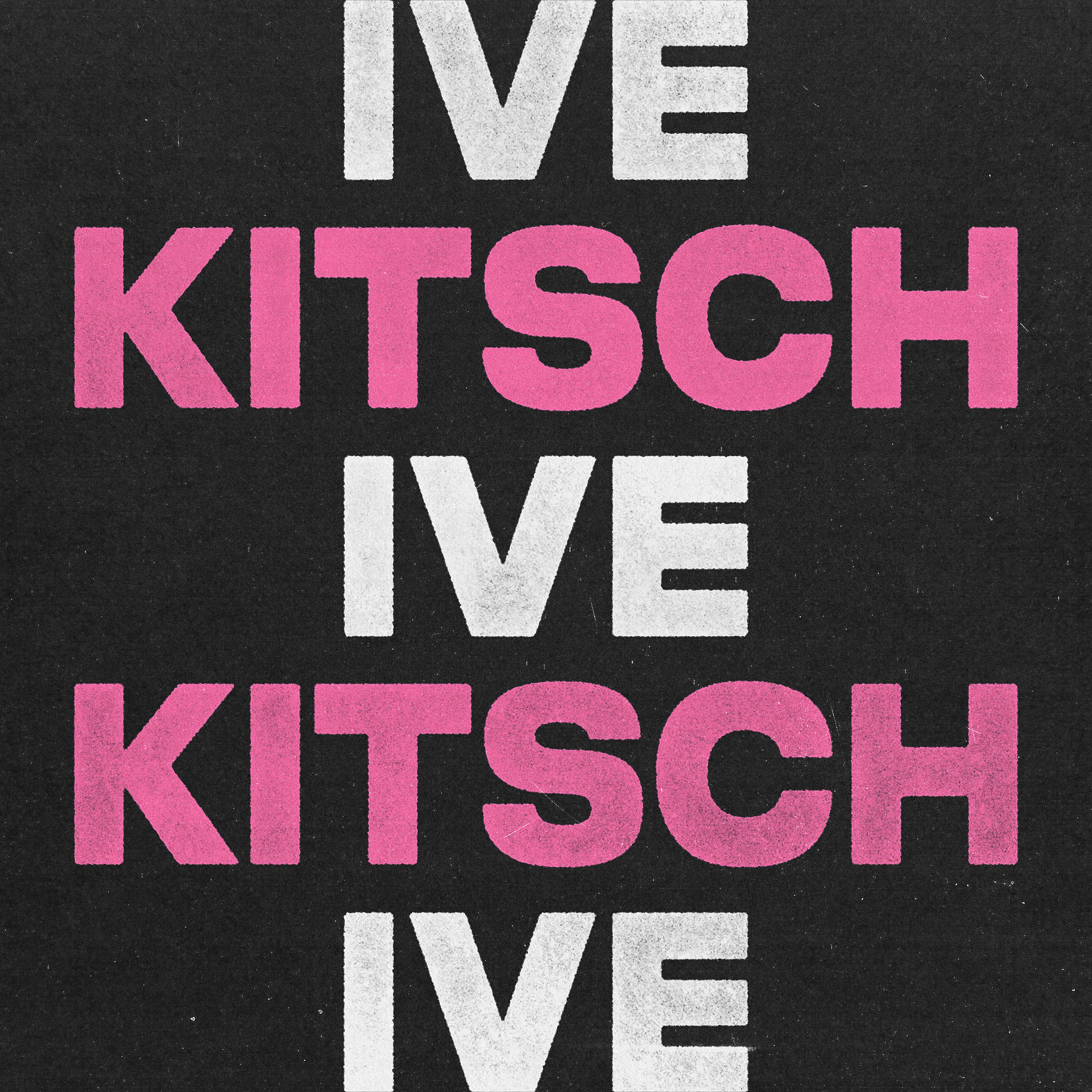

Single by Ive

from the album I've Ive
- Language: Korean; English
- Released: March 27, 2023
- Studio: Ingrid Studio; 821 Sound
- Genre: Pop
- Length: 3:15
- Label: Starship; Kakao; Columbia
- Composers: Ryan S. Jhun; Lise Reppe; Audun Agnar Guldbrandsen; Kyle Joseph Faulkner; Tea Carpenter; Emily Harbakk; Stally; Pateko
- Lyricists: Lee Seu-ran; Hwang Hyun (MonoTree); Gaeul; Rei

Ive singles chronology
"After Like" (2022)	"Kitsch" (2023)	"I Am" (2023)

Music video
- "Kitsch" on YouTube

Professional ratings
Review scores
Source	Rating
IZM	3/5 stars

"Kitsch" is a song recorded by South Korean girl group Ive for their first studio album, I've Ive. It was released as the album's pre-release single on March 27, 2023, through Starship Entertainment and Columbia. It is a pop song characterized by basslines and bouncing sounds, with lyrics written by Lee Seu-ran, Hwang Hyun (MonoTree) as well as group members Gaeul and Rei, whilst composition was handled by various contributors, including Ryan S. Jhun, who had previously helped compose "After Like" and "Eleven".

"Kitsch" was a commercial success in South Korea and topped the Circle Digital Chart for three weeks, becoming Ive's third number-one single in the country. It also reached the top ten of the national charts in Singapore and Taiwan and has been certified platinum for streaming in South Korea. As of November 2023, the accompanying music video for the song has reached over 100 million views on Starship Entertainment's YouTube channel.

== Background ==
"Kitsch" serves as a pre-release single for Ive's first studio album, I've Ive, to be made available on April 10. Its release marked the group's first single under a new label deal, upon Starship Entertainment and Kakao signing a partnership with Columbia Records in the United States.

== Composition ==
"Kitsch" is a "bubbly" pop track that combines strong beats, basslines, and various bouncing sounds. The song showcases the group's "unique charm" and reveals their self-confidence and identity, which became stronger with their "dignified appearance."

Billboard noted the track's opening lyrics as almost "prophetic", with member Wonyoung singing the line "It's our time." Its lyrics revolves around themes of expressing confidence and self-love, with the publication regarding them as the group's "now-signature themes." Nylon noted the track's balance between both dark and light, with it being a "bubbly pop song that hides an otherwise dark and edgy core."

== Commercial performance ==
"Kitsch" was a commercial success in South Korea. Upon release, it topped all real-time charts in South Korea and achieved their second song to get perfect all-kill (PAK). The song debuted at number one on the Circle Digital Chart.

== Music video ==
=== Background ===
On March 20, a teaser video titled "It's our time, Kitsch" was uploaded to Starship Entertainment's YouTube channel, with teaser images featuring the members posted in the following days. Upon the music video's release on March 27, it topped YouTube's trending page and surpassed 9.21 million views within 23 hours.

=== Synopsis ===
The meaning of "kitsch" (Note: As quoted from GQ, "The dictionary meaning of kitsch is 'vulgar work, fake'. In modern times, 'kitsch' was used as a sarcasm of trivial, vulgar, and popular art as the antipode of high culture.") "has become an aesthetic trend," which the group presents in the music video, where they capture "the spirit of kitsch" throughout various cultural references; amongst them is the phrase “Book, not guns. Culture, not violence,” from the 2003 movie The Dreamers, capturing "the spirit of resistance against the older generation and elitism that young people had in the midst of chaotic times during the French Revolution of 1968".

== Accolades ==
Music program awards for "Kitsch"
Program	Date	Ref.
Show! Music Core	April 8, 2023	
Inkigayo	April 9, 2023	

== Credits and personnel ==
Credits adapted from Melon.

- Ive – vocals
  - Gaeul – lyricist
  - Rei – lyricist
- Kriz – background vocals, vocal director
- Lee Seu-ran – lyricist, composer
- Hwang Hyun (MonoTree) – lyricist, composer
- Ryan S. Jhun – composer, arranger
- Lise Reppe – composer, arranger
- Audun Agnar Guldbrandsen – composer, arranger
- Kyle Joseph Faulkner – composer
- Tea Carpeter – composer
- Emily Harbakk – composer
- Stally – composer, arranger
- Pateko – composer, arranger
- Minhee Kim – recording engineer (at 821 Sound)
- Youngeun Yang – recording engineer (at Ingrid Studio)
- Kyungwon Lee – digital editing
- Markus Gustafson – mixing
- Namwoo Kwon – mastering

== Charts ==
=== Weekly charts ===
Weekly chart performance for "Kitsch"
Chart (2023)	Peak position
Global 200 (Billboard)	59
Hong Kong (Billboard)	17
Japan (Japan Hot 100)	37
Japan Combined Singles (Oricon)	26
Malaysia (Billboard)	14
New Zealand Hot Singles (RMNZ)	23
Singapore (RIAS)	7
South Korea (Circle)	1
Taiwan (Billboard)	7
US World Digital Song Sales (Billboard)	11
Vietnam (Vietnam Hot 100)	40

=== Monthly charts ===
Monthly chart performance for "Kitsch"
Chart (2023)	Position
South Korea (Circle)	1

=== Year-end charts ===
2023 year-end chart performance for "Kitsch"
Chart (2023)	Position
South Korea (Circle)	6

2024 year-end chart performance for "Kitsch"
Chart (2024)	Position
South Korea (Circle)	88

== Certifications ==
Streaming certifications for "Kitsch"
Region	Certification	Certified units/sales
South Korea (KMCA)	Platinum	100,000,000^{†}
^{†} Streaming-only figures based on certification alone.

== Release history ==
Release history for "Kitsch"
Region	Date	Format	Label
Various	March 27, 2023	Digital download; streaming	Starship; Columbia

== See also ==
- List of Circle Digital Chart number ones of 2023
- List of Show! Music Core Chart winners (2023)
- List of Inkigayo Chart winners (2023)
