= Looks Can Kill =

- Digital cover

EP by Ive
- Released: October 26, 2026
- Length: 18:47
- Languages: Korean; English
- Labels: Starship; Kakao; Columbia

Ive chronology
Lucid Dream (2026)	Looks Can Kill (2026)

Singles from Looks Can Kill
- 1. "Looks Can Kill" Released: October 19, 2026

Looks Can Kill is the fifth Korean-language extended play and ninth overall by South Korean girl group Ive. It was released by Starship Entertainment on October 26, 2026, and contains six tracks, including the lead single of the same name.

== Background and release ==
On September 27, 2026, upon the release of promotional teasers, Starship Entertainment announced that Ive would be releasing their fifth extended play titled Looks Can Kill on October 26, with a single to be pre-released on October 19. Upon the release of the promotion schedule poster on September 29, the pre-release single was confirmed to be the lead single "Looks Can Kill". A movie poster-styler teaser was released on September 30, and "Cast" concept photos were released on October 2, with the members dressed as their super hero personas. The EP's track listing and credits was released on October 4, revealing various collaborators who worked on the lyrics and composition, including members Rei, Gaeul and Liz, the South Korean artists Gaeko, Seo Ji-eum, Lil Cherry and Omega Sapien, and Swedish singer-songwriter Zara Larsson.

On October 6, a concept video titled Post Credits Scene: Girl Hero was released, followed by "Girl Hero" concept photos released over the following three days. Another concept video titled Hero Training Center: Hero Comics was released on October 11, followed by "Hero Comics" concept photos released daily until October 14. On October 16 and 17, music video teasers for "Looks Can Kill" were released. "Hero on Set" concept photos were released on the following day. The lead single was released alongside its music video on October 19. On October 21, the highlight medley video of the album's tracks was released. The extended play was released on October 26.

== Track listing ==
Looks Can Kill track listing
No.	Title	Lyrics	Music	Arrangement	Length
1.	"Looks Can Kill"	Gaeko; Seo Ji-eum; Lil Cherry; Rei; Rick Bridges	Charles Robert Nelsen; Bava; Ashley Fulton; Jason Hahs; MLite	Inverness; Bava	3:15
2.	"Mirror Mirror"	Seo Ji-eum	Joshua Linne; Nikolai Mohr; Blush Davis; Miranda Glory Inzunza; Natania Lalwani; MLite	FriendsFromCollege	3:20
3.	"Snakeskin"	Seo Ji-eum	Jack Brady; Jordan Roman; Kristine Bogan; Lauren Aquilina; MLite	The Wavys	3:21
4.	"Crumbs"	Lee Seu-ran; Omega Sapien; Lil Cherry; Jo Yoon-kyung; Gaeul; Liz	Jhune; Evan Gartner; Gabriella Grombacher; MLite	Jhune; Evan Gartner	3:08
5.	"Girls Girls Girls"	Seo Ji-eum	Kevin Hickey; Samuel Robert Knowles; Alna Hofmeyr; Castle; Sarah Hudson; MLite	Zhone; Karma Kid	2:42
6.	"Glow Motion"	Jo Yoon-kyung	Zara Larsson; Caila Thompson-Hannant; Margo Wildman; MLite	Cecile Believe; Margo XS	3:01
Total length:					18:47

== Charts ==
=== Weekly charts ===
Weekly chart performance for Looks Can Kill
Chart (2026)	Peak position
Greek Albums (IFPI)	53
Japanese Albums (Oricon)	6
Japanese Combined Albums (Oricon)	7
South Korean Albums (Circle)	1
US Billboard 200	126
US Independent Albums (Billboard)	19
US World Albums (Billboard)	2

=== Monthly charts ===
Monthly chart performance for Looks Can Kill
Chart (2026)	Peak Position
Japanese Albums (Oricon)	35
South Korean Albums (Circle)	4

== Release history ==
Release history for Looks Can Kill
Region	Date	Format	Label
South Korea	October 26, 2026	CD	Starship; Kakao; Columbia
Various	October 26, 2026	Digital download; streaming	Starship; Kakao; Columbia
