= Looks Can Kill (song) =

Single by Ive

from the EP Looks Can Kill
- Language: Korean
- Released: October 19, 2026
- Length: 3:15
- Label: Starship; Kakao; Columbia
- Composers: Charles Robert Nelsen; Bava; Ashley Fulton; Jason Hahs; MLite
- Lyricists: Gaeko; Seo Ji-eum; Lil Cherry; Rei; Rick Bridges

Ive singles chronology
| "Lucid Dream" (2026) | "Looks Can Kill" (2026) |

Music video
- "Looks Can Kill" on YouTube

Professional ratings
Review scores
| Source | Rating |
|---|---|
| IZM | 2/5 stars |

"Looks Can Kill" is a song recorded by South Korean girl group Ive for their fifth Korean extended play of the same name. It was released as the EP's lead single by Starship Entertainment on October 19, 2026.

== Background and release ==
On September 27, 2026, Starship Entertainment announced that Ive's fifth extended play Looks Can Kill would be released on October 26, with a single to be pre-released on October 19. On September 29, the single was confirmed to be titled "Looks Can Kill", and serves as the EP's lead single. A short preview of the song was revealed across social media channels on October 12. On October 16 and 17, teasers for the song's music video was released. The song was released alongside its music video on October 19.

== Composition ==
"Looks Can Kill" was written by Gaeko, Seo Ji-eum, Lil Cherry, Rei and Rick Bridges (with rap making by Rei and Bridges), composed by Charles Robert Nelsen, Bava, Ashley Fulton, Jason Hahs, and MLite, and arranged by Inverness and Bava. The song is described as "an energetic song blending captivating synth pad rhythms with heavy bass, dynamic drums, and electronic sounds", showcasing Ive's confidence in overwhelming their opponents and seizing the moment.

== Promotion ==
Ive performed "Looks Can Kill" on four music programs during their first week of promotion: Mnet's M Countdown on October 22, KBS's Music Bank on October 23, MBC's Show! Music Core on October 24, and SBS's Inkigayo on October 25.

== Charts ==
=== Weekly charts ===
Weekly chart performance for "Looks Can Kill"
| Chart (2026) | Peak position |
|---|---|
| Global 200 (Billboard) | 194 |
| Hong Kong (Billboard) | 19 |
| Japan (Japan Hot 100) | 28 |
| Japan Combined Singles (Oricon) | 42 |
| Singapore Regional (RIAS) | 14 |
| South Korea (Circle) | 4 |
| Taiwan (Billboard) | 6 |

=== Monthly charts ===
Monthly chart performance for "Looks Can Kill"
| Chart (2026) | Peak position |
|---|---|
| South Korea (Circle) | 41 |

== Release history ==
Release history for "Looks Can Kill"
| Region | Date | Format | Label |
|---|---|---|---|
| Various | October 19, 2026 | Digital download; streaming | Starship; Kakao; Columbia |
