= List of Show! Music Core Chart winners (2023) =

Show! Music Core Chart winners (2023)

The Show! Music Core Chart is a record chart on the South Korean MBC television music program Show! Music Core. Every week, the show awards the best-performing single on the chart in the country during its live broadcast.

In 2023, 29 singles achieved number one on the chart, and 23 acts were awarded first-place trophies. "I Am" by Ive had the highest score of the year, with 9,668 points on the April 22 broadcast. (G)I-dle's "Queencard" becomes the only song to receive a Quintuple Crown.

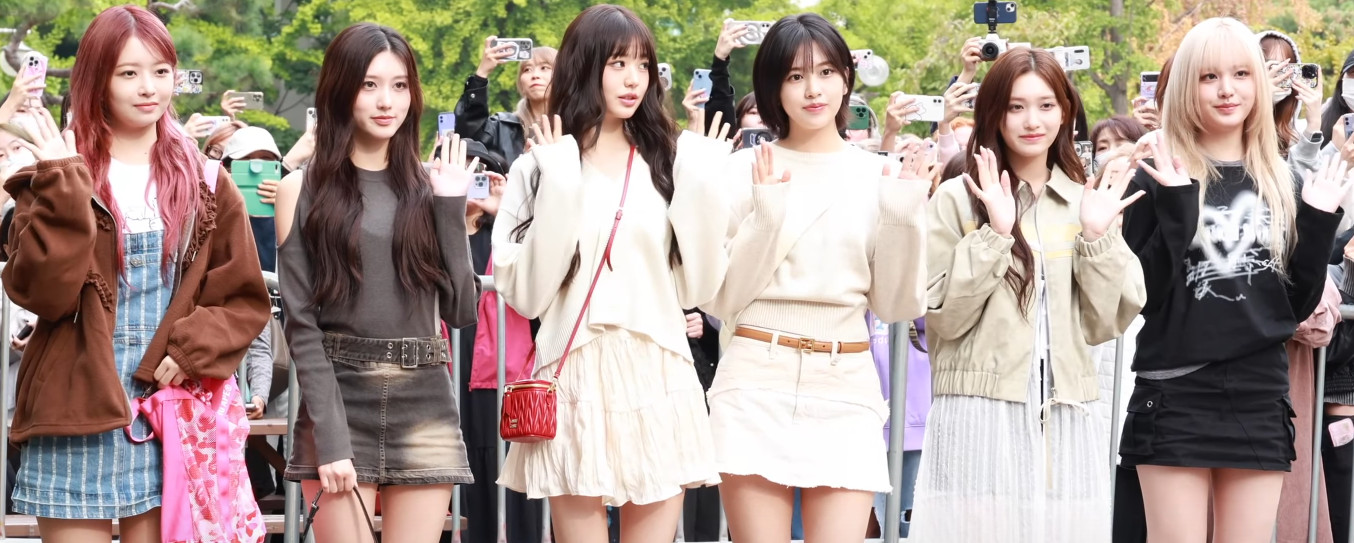
Ive's (pictured) win for "I Am" had the highest score of 2023, with 9,668 points at the April 22 broadcast

== Chart history ==
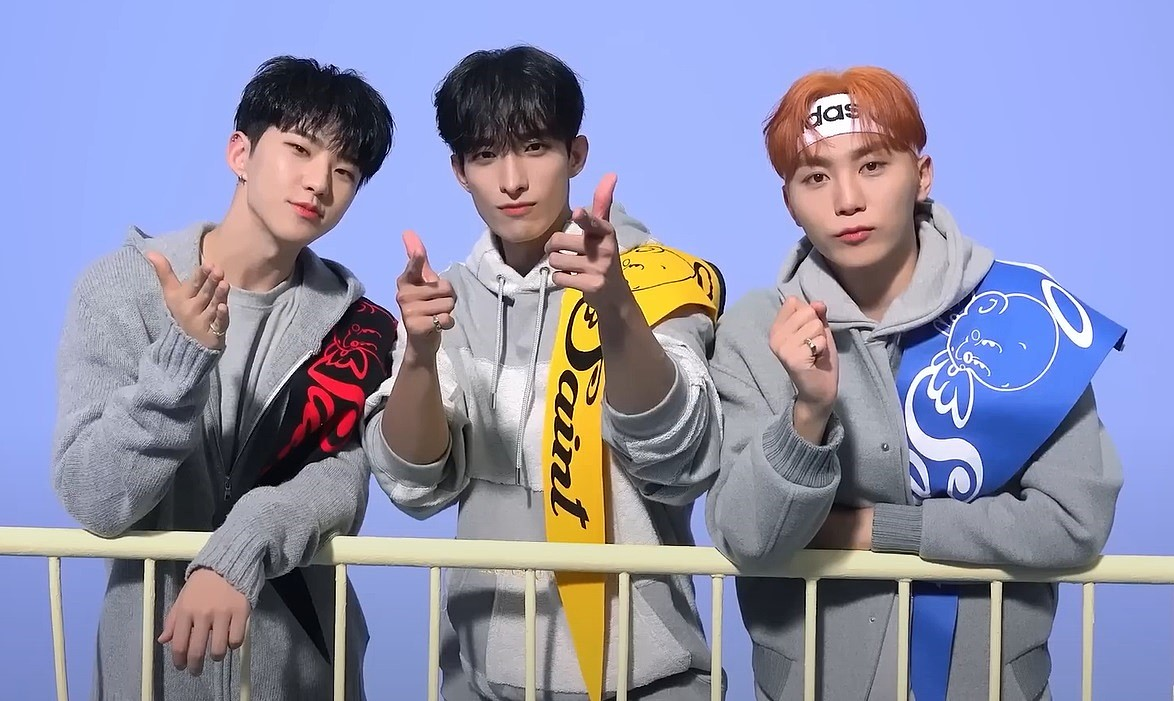
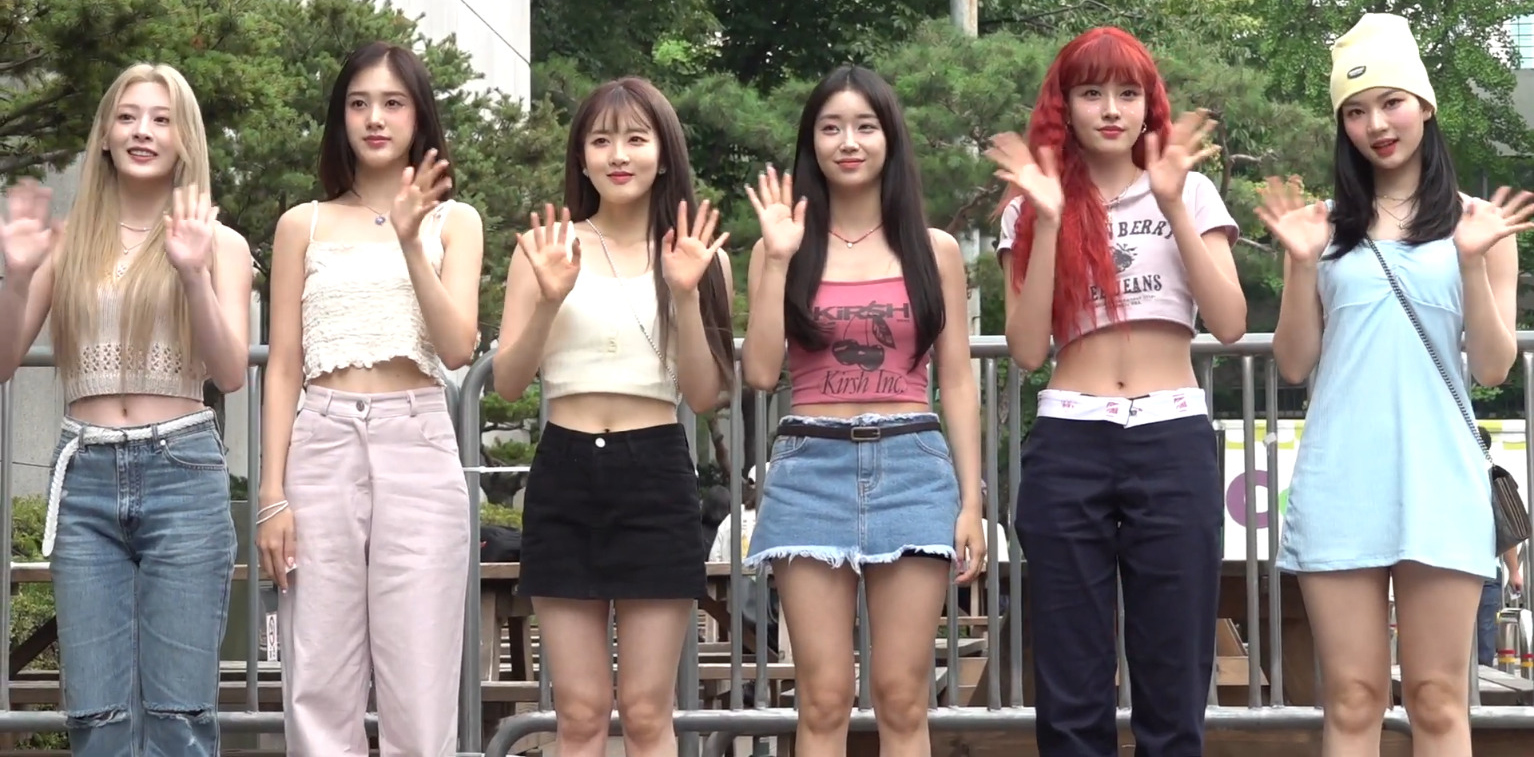
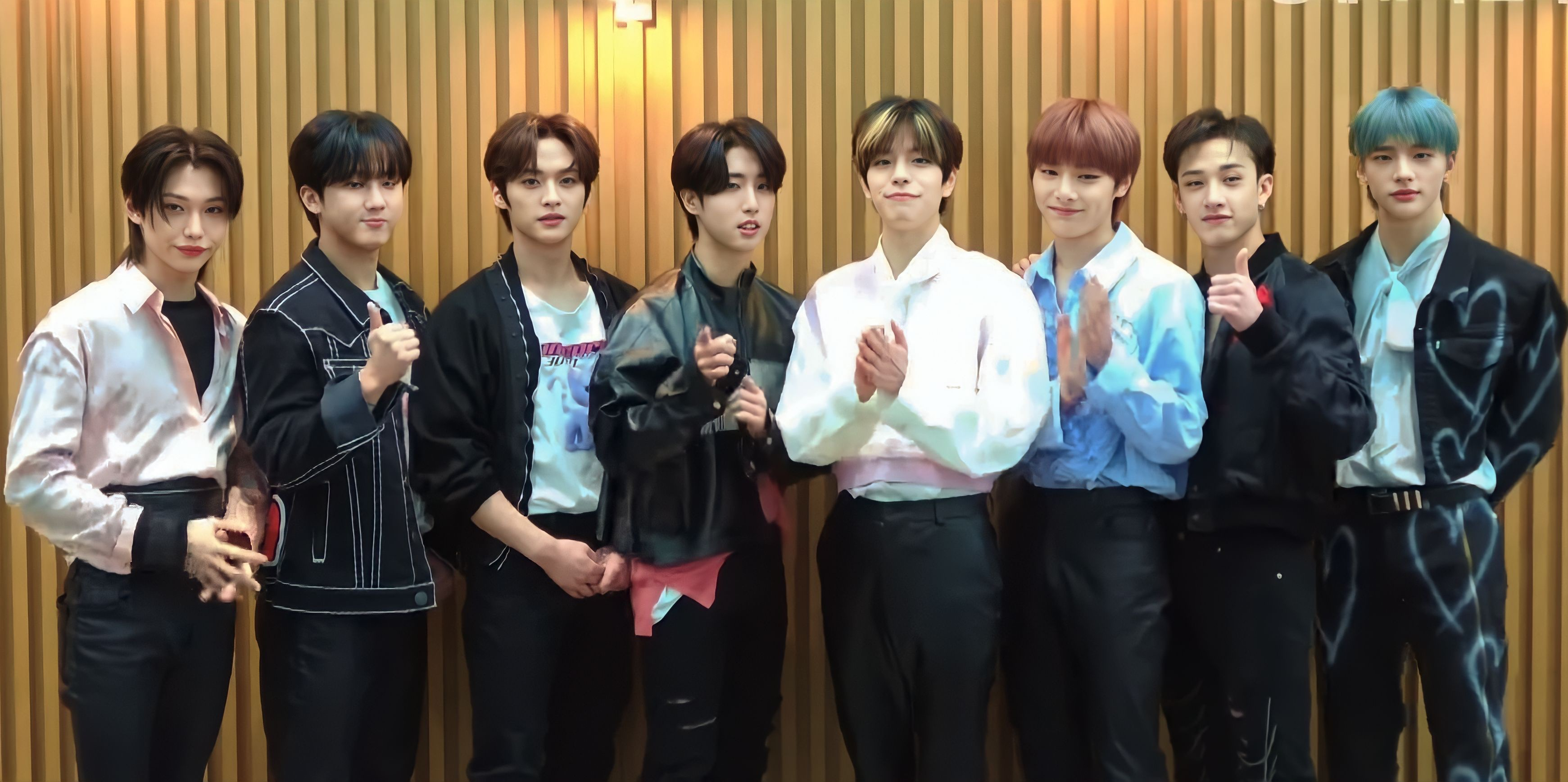
BSS (top), STAYC (middle), and Stray Kids (bottom) received their first Show! Music Core trophies for "Fighting," "Teddy Bear," and "Lalalala," respectively.
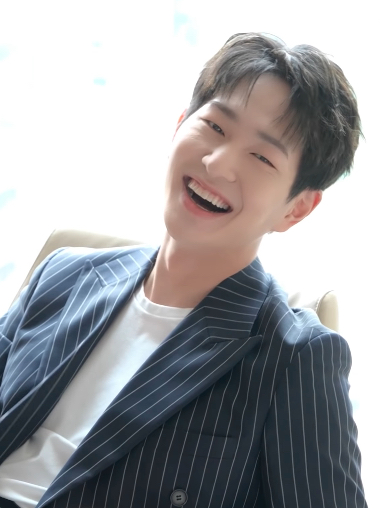
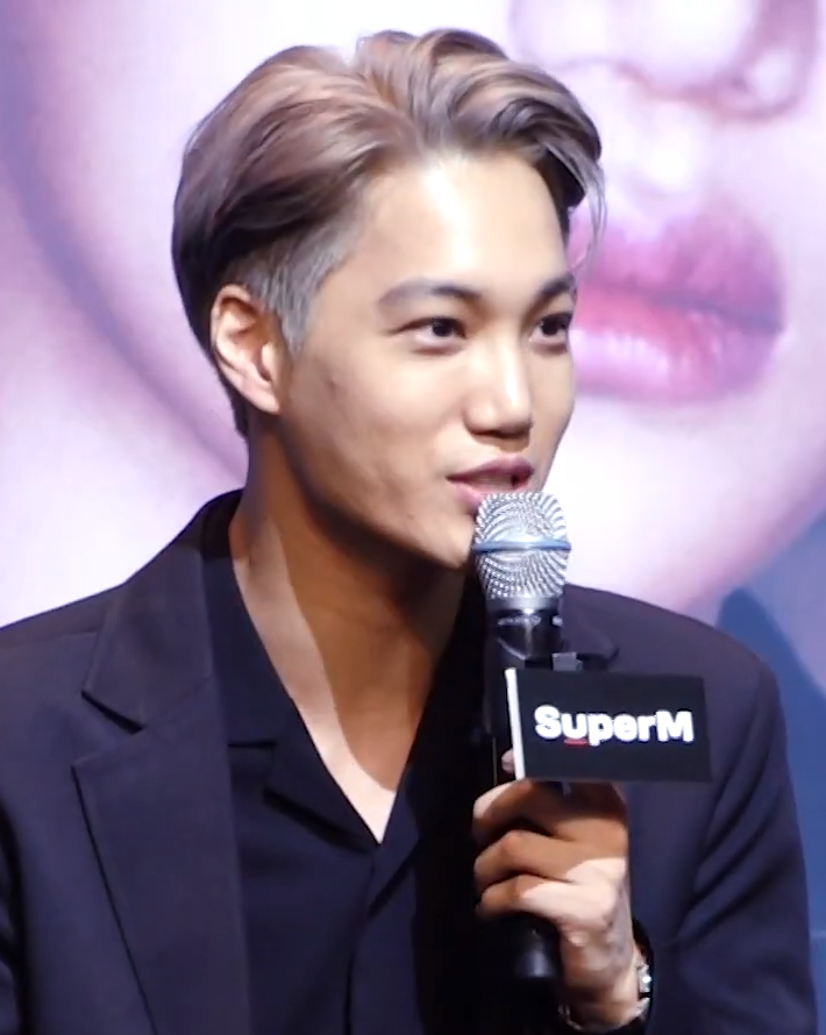
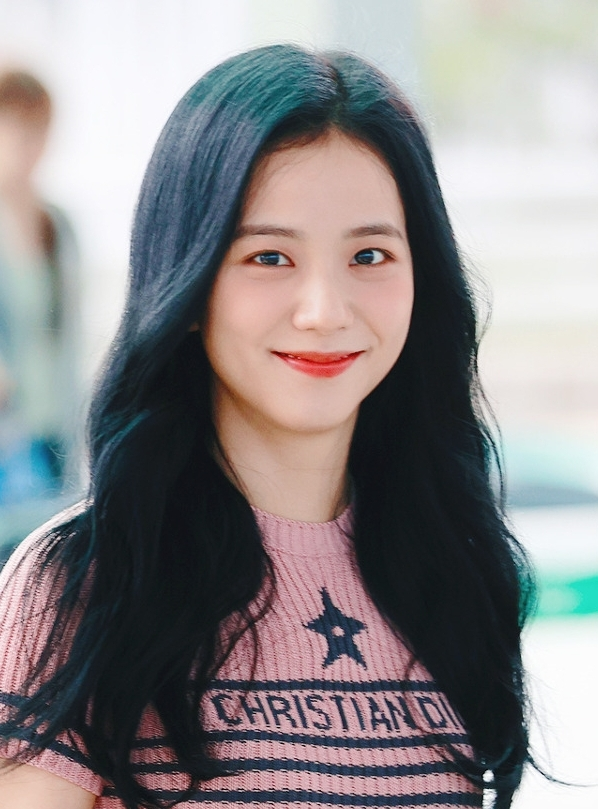
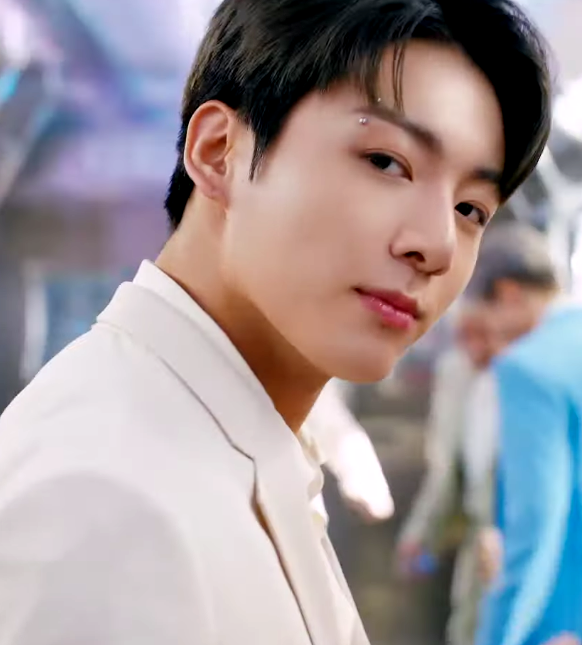
Shinee's Onew (Top left), Exo's Kai (Top right), Blackpink's Jisoo (Bottom left) and BTS's Jungkook (Bottom right) received their first Show! Music Core trophies as soloists with "O (Circle)", "Rover", "Flower" and "Seven", respectively.

Key
	Indicates a Quintuple Crown
	Highest score in 2023
—	No show was held

Episode	Date	Artist	Song	Points	Ref.
792	January 7	NewJeans	"Ditto"	5,843	
793	January 14	NewJeans	"Ditto"	7,002	
—	January 21	No show, winner not announced			
794	January 28	NewJeans	"Ditto"	6,758	
795	February 4	NewJeans	"Ditto"	5,690	
796	February 11	NCT 127	"Ay-Yo"	8,979	
797	February 18	BSS	"Fighting"	7,474	
798	February 25	BSS	"Fighting"	5,809	
799	March 4	The Boyz	"Roar"	9,401	
800	March 11	STAYC	"Teddy Bear"	7,514	
801	March 18	Onew	"O (Circle)"	6,590	
802	March 25	Kai	"Rover"	5,952	
—	April 1	No show, winner not announced			
803	April 8	Ive	"Kitsch"	7,654	
804	April 15	Jisoo	"Flower"	7,521	
805	April 22	Ive	"I Am"	9,668	
806	April 29	NCT DoJaeJung	"Perfume"	6,600	
807	May 6	Seventeen	"Super"	7,805	
808	May 13	Le Sserafim	"Unforgiven"	7,172	
809	May 20	Aespa	"Spicy"	7,511	
810	May 27	(G)I-dle	"Queencard"	7,757	
811	June 3	(G)I-dle	"Queencard"	8,133	
812	June 10	(G)I-dle	"Queencard"	6,460	
813	June 17	Lim Young-woong	"Grain of Sand"	6,519	
814	June 24	(G)I-dle	"Queencard"	6,369	
815	July 1	(G)I-dle	"Queencard"	7,504	
816	July 8	Shinee	"Hard"	9,196	
817	July 15	Lim Young-woong	"Grain of Sand"	6,619	
818	July 22	NewJeans	"Super Shy"	6,078	
819	July 29	NCT Dream	"ISTJ"	9,420	
820	August 5	Jungkook	"Seven"	6,689	
821	August 12	Special episode, winner not announced			
822	August 19	Special episode, winner not announced			
823	August 26	Jungkook	"Seven"	6,832	
824	September 2	Jungkook	"Seven"	6,671	
825	September 9	Jungkook	"Seven"	7,026	
826	September 16	AKMU	"Love Lee"	6,315	
827	September 23	AKMU	"Love Lee"	5,637	
—	September 30	Special episode, winner not announced			
—	October 7	Special episode, winner not announced			
828	October 14	NCT 127	"Fact Check"	8,804	
829	October 21	Lim Young-woong	"Do or Die"	7,246	
830	October 28	Lim Young-woong	"Do or Die"	6,798	
831	November 4	Seventeen	"God of Music"	9,096	
832	November 11	Taemin	"Guilty"	6,420	
833	November 18	Stray Kids	"Lalalala"	6,901	
834	November 25	Red Velvet	"Chill Kill"	7,137	
835	December 2	The Boyz	"Watch It"	7,129	
836	December 9	Le Sserafim	"Perfect Night"	6,034	
837	December 16	Le Sserafim	"Perfect Night"	6,863	
