= List of Circle Digital Chart number ones of 2023 =

The Circle Digital Chart is a chart that ranks the best-performing singles in South Korea. Managed by the domestic Ministry of Culture, Sports and Tourism (MCST), its data is compiled by the Korea Music Content Industry Association and published by the Circle Chart. The ranking is based collectively on each single's download sales, stream count, and background music use. The Circle Chart provides weekly (listed from Sunday to Saturday), monthly, and yearly lists for the chart.

== Weekly charts ==
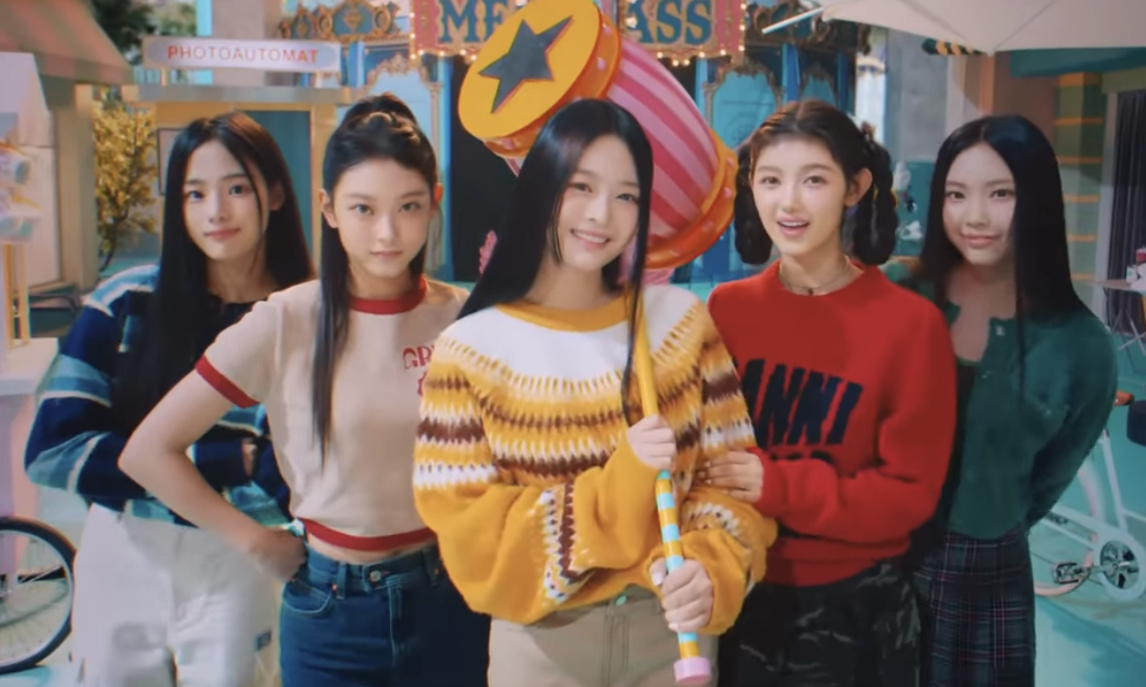
NewJeans' "Ditto" broke the record set by "Dynamite" for the most weeks at the top, with 13 weeks. It is also the second song in Circle Chart history to reach number one on the monthly chart three times.

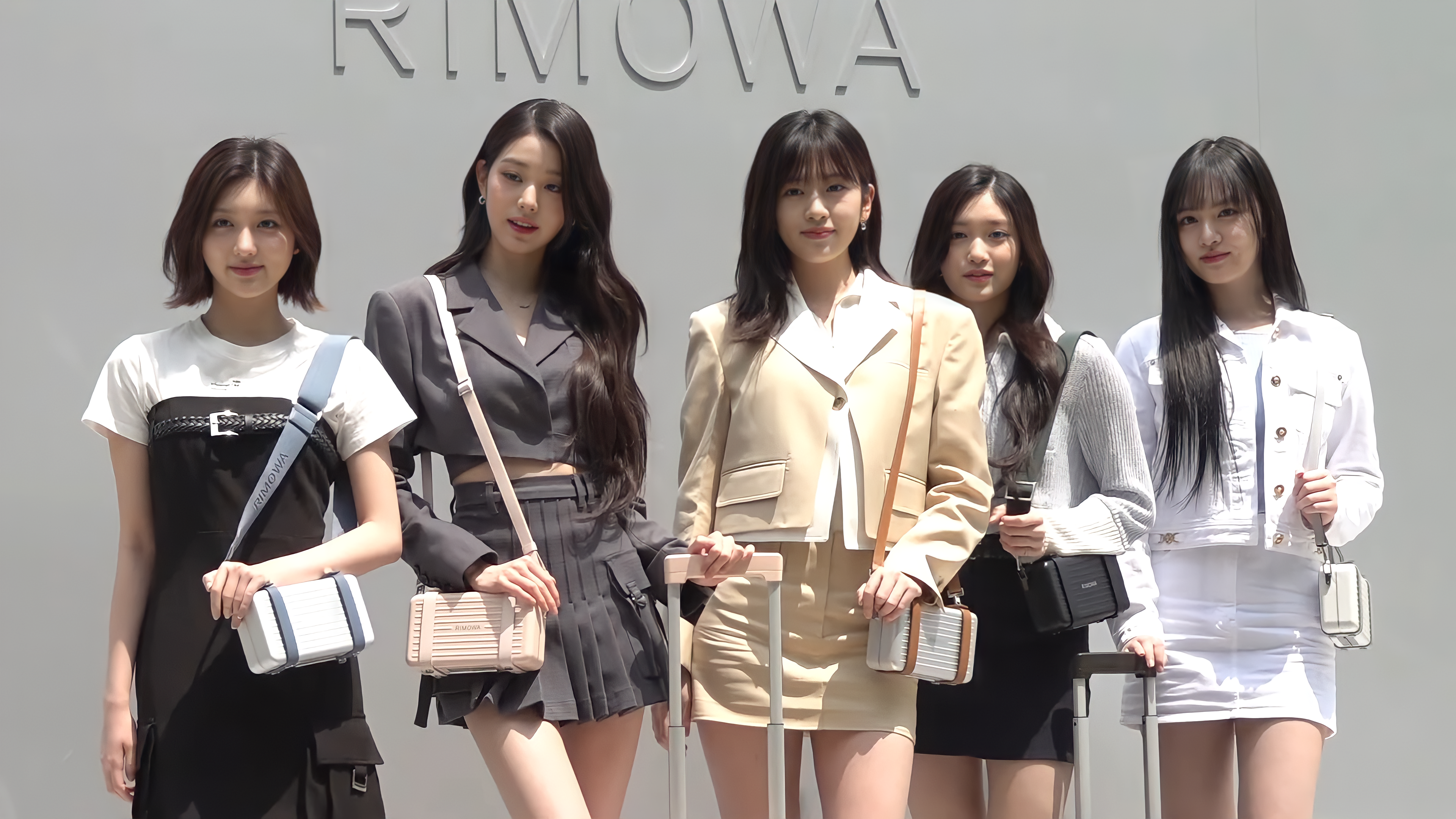
Ive topped the chart for 12 weeks and the monthly chart three times with "Kitsch", "I Am", and "Baddie".

†	Indicates best-performing single of 2023

List of number-one songs on the weekly Circle Digital Chart in 2023
Week ending date	Song	Artist(s)	Ref.
January 7	"Ditto" †	NewJeans	
January 14	"Ditto" †	NewJeans	
January 21	"Ditto" †	NewJeans	
January 28	"Ditto" †	NewJeans	
February 4	"Ay-Yo"	NCT 127	
February 11	"Ditto" †	NewJeans	
February 18	"Ditto" †	NewJeans	
February 25	"Ditto" †	NewJeans	
March 4	"Ditto" †	NewJeans	
March 11	"Ditto" †	NewJeans	
March 18	"Ditto" †	NewJeans	
March 25	"Ditto" †	NewJeans	
April 1	"Kitsch"	Ive	
April 8	"Kitsch"	Ive	
April 15	"Kitsch"	Ive	
April 22	"I Am"	Ive	
April 29	"I Am"	Ive	
May 6	"I Am"	Ive	
May 13	"I Am"	Ive	
May 20	"I Am"	Ive	
May 27	"I Am"	Ive	
June 3	"Queencard"	(G)I-dle	
June 10	"Grain of Sand" (모래 알갱이)	Lim Young-woong	
June 17	"Queencard"	(G)I-dle	
June 24	"Queencard"	(G)I-dle	
July 1	"Queencard"	(G)I-dle	
July 8	"Queencard"	(G)I-dle	
July 15	"Super Shy"	NewJeans	
July 22	"Super Shy"	NewJeans	
July 29	"Super Shy"	NewJeans	
August 5	"Super Shy"	NewJeans	
August 12	"Super Shy"	NewJeans	
August 19	"Super Shy"	NewJeans	
August 26	"Super Shy"	NewJeans	
September 2	"Super Shy"	NewJeans	
September 9	"Love Lee"	AKMU	
September 16	"Love Lee"	AKMU	
September 23	"Love Lee"	AKMU	
September 30	"Love Lee"	AKMU	
October 7	"Love Lee"	AKMU	
October 14	"Do or Die"	Lim Young-woong	
October 21	"Love Lee"	AKMU	
October 28	"God of Music" (음악의 신)	Seventeen	
November 4	"Baddie"	Ive	
November 11	"Baddie"	Ive	
November 18	"Baddie"	Ive	
November 25	"Perfect Night"	Le Sserafim	
December 2	"Perfect Night"	Le Sserafim	
December 9	"Perfect Night"	Le Sserafim	
December 16	"Perfect Night"	Le Sserafim	
December 23	"The First Snow" (첫 눈)	Exo	
December 30	"Be There for Me"	NCT 127	

== Monthly charts ==
List of number-one songs on the monthly Circle Digital Chart in 2023
Month	Song	Artist(s)	Ref.
January	"Ditto" †	NewJeans	
February	"Ditto" †	NewJeans	
March	"Ditto" †	NewJeans	
April	"Kitsch"	Ive	
May	"I Am"	Ive	
June	"Queencard"	(G)I-dle	
July	"Super Shy"	NewJeans	
August	"Super Shy"	NewJeans	
September	"Love Lee"	AKMU	
October	"Love Lee"	AKMU	
November	"Baddie"	Ive	
December	"Perfect Night"	Le Sserafim	
