= After Like =

- Digital cover

Single album by Ive
- Released: August 22, 2022
- Genre: Nu-disco
- Length: 6:09
- Languages: Korean; English
- Labels: Starship; Kakao

Ive chronology
| Love Dive (2022) | After Like (2022) | I've Ive (2023) |

Singles from After Like
- 1. "After Like" Released: August 22, 2022

After Like (stylized as After LIKE) is the third single album by South Korean girl group Ive. It was released by Starship Entertainment on August 22, 2022, and contains two tracks, including the lead single of the same name.

The album debuted at number one on the Circle Album Chart with over one million copies sold in its first week of release, becoming Ive's third number-one album. It has since been certified million by the Korea Music Content Association (KMCA) for selling 1,000,000 units. For the album, Ive was awarded New Artist of the Year in the physical category at the 12th Circle Chart Music Awards.

== Background and release ==
On July 24, 2022, Starship Entertainment announced that Ive would be releasing their third single album, After Like, on August 22. On August 1, a promotional video titled "I've Summer Film" was released. Six days later, the promotional scheduled was released. On August 7, the track listing was released, with "After Like" confirmed as the lead single. The music video teaser for "After Like" was released on August 19, followed by the album's highlight medley video on August 21. After Like was released alongside the lead single's music video on August 22.

== Composition ==
After Like consists of two tracks that incorporate elements of nu-disco. Lead single "After Like" is a pop and house song that samples "I Will Survive" by Gloria Gaynor with lyrics about "showing your love methods with actions rather than your heart". The second track, "My Satisfaction", was described as a dance-pop song with a "heavy beat".

== Commercial performance ==
After Like debuted at number one on South Korea's Circle Album Chart in the chart issue dated August 21–27, 2022, with over 1 million copies sold. On the year-end Circle Album Chart, it was the 10th best-selling album of 2022, having sold 1,652,402 album copies overall and the third best-selling album by a female artist in the chart on 2022.

== Critical reception ==
Professional ratings
Review scores
| Source | Rating |
|---|---|
| NME | 4/5 stars |

Carmen Chin from NME gave After Like a 4 out of 5 star rating, describing the single album as a "fitting third chapter" in Ive's musical journey that sees them "blossom as young women well-accustomed to the nuances of love, all while developing their own signature sounds and visual concepts." She praised the single "After Like" as a "powerful, elegant confessional anthem" that combines a nu-disco sound with the group's "dulcet harmonies". Chin found that the B-side track "My Satisfaction" deviated from the group's usual sound with a "gruffer, richer cadence" that did not threaten their "chic brand" but rather added "new depth" to their image.

== Accolades ==
Awards and nominations for After Like
| Award ceremony | Year | Category | Result | Ref. |
|---|---|---|---|---|
| Circle Chart Music Awards | 2023 | New Artist of the Year – Physical | Won | |
| Circle Chart Music Awards | 2023 | Album of the Year – 3rd Quarter | Nominated | |

== Track listing ==
Track listing for After Like
| No. | Title | Lyrics | Music | Arrangement | Length |
|---|---|---|---|---|---|
| 1. | "After Like" | Seo Ji-eum; Mommy Son; Rei | Ryan S. Jhun; Anders Nilsen; André Jensen; Iselin Solheim | Ryan S. Jhun; Anders Nilsen; Avin; Slay | 2:56 |
| 2. | "My Satisfaction" | Lee Seu-ran | Ryan S. Jhun; Josh Cumbee; Afshin Salmani; Nat Dunn; Ilan Kidron; Anna Timgren; Justin Reinstein | Ryan S. Jhun; Josh Cumbee; Afshin Salmani; Avin; Slay | 3:13 |
| Total length: | | | | | 6:09 |

== Credits and personnel ==
Credits adapted from Melon.

- Ive – vocals (all tracks)
  - Rei – rap lyrics (track 1)
- Mommy Son – rap lyrics (track 1)
- Seo Ji-eum – lyrics (track 1)
- Lee Seu-ran – lyrics (track 2)
- Ryan S. Jhun – composition, arrangement (all tracks)
- Anders Nilsen – composition, arrangement (track 1)
- André Jensen – composition (track 1)
- Iselin Solheim – composition (track 1)
- Josh Cumbee – composition, arrangement (track 2)
- Afshin Salmani – composition, arrangement (track 2)
- Nat Dunn – composition (track 2)
- Ilan Kidron – composition (track 2)
- Anna Timgren – composition (track 2)
- Justin Reinstein – composition (track 2)
- Avin – arrangement (all tracks)
- Slay – arrangement (all tracks)

== Charts ==
=== Weekly charts ===
Weekly chart performance
| Chart (2022) | Peak position |
|---|---|
| Croatian International Albums (HDU) | 20 |
| South Korean Albums (Circle) | 1 |

=== Monthly charts ===
Monthly chart performance
| Chart (2022) | Peak position |
|---|---|
| South Korean Albums (Circle) | 1 |

=== Year-end charts ===
Year-end chart performance
| Chart (2022) | Position |
|---|---|
| South Korean Albums (Circle) | 10 |

== Certifications and sales ==
Certifications and sales for After Like
| Region | Certification | Sales |
|---|---|---|
| South Korea (KMCA) | Million | 1,732,665 |

== Release history ==
Release history
| Region | Date | Format | Label |
|---|---|---|---|
| South Korea | August 22, 2022 | CD | Starship; Kakao |
| Various | August 22, 2022 | Digital download; streaming | Starship; Kakao |
