= Queencard =

2023 single by (G)I-dle

- Promotional graphic

Single by (G)I-dle

from the EP I Feel
- Language: Korean
- Released: May 15, 2023
- Studio: Cube Studio (Seoul)
- Genre: Pop
- Length: 2:41
- Label: Cube; Kakao
- Songwriters: Soyeon; Pop Time; Daily; Likey
- Producer: Soyeon

(G)I-dle singles chronology
"Nxde" (2022)	"Queencard" (2023)	"I Do" (2023)

Music video
- "Queencard" on YouTube

"Queencard" (Korean: 퀸카; RR: Kwinka) is a song by South Korean girl group (G)I-dle. It was released through Cube Entertainment on May 15, 2023, as the lead single of the group's sixth extended play, I Feel. A pop song driven by rock and roll influence, and 2000s-inspired electronic production, written and produced by Soyeon, the song relates to the storyline of "Allergy," and addresses themes of self-acceptance and self-confidence. The single sees the group's departure from their previous sounds to a lighter, comical, and retro style.

Many publications ranked the song among the best releases of 2023, praising the pop and vocal production, and empowering tongue-in-cheek lyrics. Commercially, the single peaked at number one on the Circle Chart for four consecutive weeks. It also peaked in the top ten on Billboard's Hits of the World charts in Taiwan, Hong Kong, Malaysia, and the US World Digital Song Sales. Later, it was certified Gold by RIAJ for surpassing 50 million streams in the country.

An accompanying music video was directed by Han Sa-min and uploaded onto the group's YouTube channel simultaneously with the single's release. (G)I-DLE promoted the song by appearing on various South Korean music programs, where they won a total of 13 first-place trophies on Show Champion, M Countdown, Music Bank, Show! Music Core, and Inkigayo, achieving their first music show grand slam. They notably became the first girl group and the second group overall to win the Quintuple Crown on Show! Music Core since its implementation in February 2021.

== Background and release ==
Cube Entertainment unveiled a video teaser titled "(G)I-dle original series" on April 18, 2023, announcing the group's return on May 15. The new songs' titles were unveiled in the said video, each of which began with the word "Episode." The announcement was also accompanied by a concept poster featuring a drawing of a Trump's queen card, with the letter 'G', representing the G in the group's name, engraved in the upper left corner of the poster instead of 'Q', in which means queen.

On April 24, (G)I-DLE unveiled the tracklist and a teaser video, officially announcing "Queencard" as the lead single. Two days later, on April 26, they introduced "map characters," providing insights into each member's role in the upcoming music videos for "Allergy" and the lead single. Following this, an "introduction video" inspired by the 2004 movie Mean Girls was released on April 27. "Spoiler Alert: Soyeon" premiered on May 4, offering snippets of the second track, "Allergy," and establishing its connection to "Queencard." This was accompanied by teaser images titled "Episode: Allergy," aligning with the theme of an "original series" concept that they were going for. On May 9, 2023, Cube uploaded five individual teaser photos for each member of the group on their social media accounts, confirming the release of track two "Allergy", on May 10. Four days later, on May 14, the group unveiled the "Queencard" poster, confirming its release the next day.

== Music and lyrics ==
"Queencard" is a pop song led by "hints" of rock and roll influence, a "sultry' bassline, and electronic elements that resemble the 2000s Composed in the key of E minor with a tempo of 130 beats per minute. During the press event for the album, Soyeon explained the song's core message: "the core message of 'Queencard' is that you can be a beautiful person if you adore yourself." She then explained that the meaning behind it is that "the important thing is not the appearance", but accepting oneself regardless. Soyeon cited member Yuqi as the inspiration behind the song due to her personality and "way of speaking". The song also included lyrical references to the American singer Ariana Grande as well as to the media personality Kim Kardashian, respectively, in the second verse, by member Yuqi: "Look so cool, look so sexy like Kim Kardashian (Uh)/ Look so cute, look so pretty like Ariana."

=== Theme ===
"If we had done music that taught and gave lessons before, this time we wanted to express the songs [message] with a light and comical point along with the motif of the movie I Feel Pretty.

— Soyeon explained the art direction, via Electronic Times.

In the album press release, elucidated that the album's overarching theme, including the lead single, revolves around self-esteem and confidence Departing from their previous releases' serious tone, the group aimed to convey their message in "a light and comical way, along with the motif of the movie I Feel Pretty". She then elaborated, saying "when I was writing the title song 'Queencard', I thought of making it as if I had heard a comedy movie. Also, I thought about bringing [back] the music drama format that was popular in the 2000s." Thus, the name "Queencard," a specific South Korean term referring to a popular, affluent girl. In their song, (G)I-DLE employs satire to dissect this archetype. In a satirical exploration of attractiveness and mean girl personas lasting two minutes, the group suggests in the post-chorus that being a queencard is primarily a state of mind rather than solely based on appearance.

== Reception ==
Professional ratings
Review scores
Source	Rating
IZM	2/5 stars

In a review by Jeong Soo-min for IZM, they noted that 'Queencard', maintains a similar style to their previous songs but lacks the same level of enjoyment. Despite incorporating electronic elements reminiscent of 2000s music, while the lyrics attempt to promote body positivity, and pointing out the industry's tendency to exploit rookie artists, the track still falls short in delivering the same charm as the previous releases. "Queencard" was included on NME's year-end list of the best songs of 2023, ranking it at number 35 and writing that it "unearthed a celebration of self-empowerment that celebrated other women and delivered a tongue-in-cheek and powerful new affirmation to repeat in the mirror". Dazed also included it in their year-end list of the best K-pop tracks of 2023, ranking it at number 45. Grammy named it one of the 15 K-pop songs that defined 2023, naming the track as a potential "antidote" for those seeking a confidence boost. Writing, "(G)I-dle employ their megawatt charisma to deliver an irreverent, unabashedly pop track with hints of rock and roll. Part satire, part girl power anthem." Business Insider ranked it number 6 on their list of the best K-pop songs of 2023, describing it as playful blending sultry bass lines with vocals reminiscent of Beyoncé's "Diva." Through two minutes of satirical portrayal of attractiveness and mean girl personas, (G)I-DLE posits in the post-chorus that being a queencard is primarily a state of mind rather than a physical attribute, noting "singing along to "Queencard" feels like enough of a self-fulfilling prophecy that it's not too hard to buy into".

In South Korea, "Queencard" was a commercial success. Upon release, it topped all real-time charts in South Korea and achieved the group's third perfect all-kill (PAK). It went on to debut at number five on the week 20 issue of the Circle Digital Chart for the period dated May 14–20, becoming the group's fifth top-ten hit on said chart. On its third week, it rose to a peak at number one for the period dated May 28 – June 6, becoming the group's third number one hit. In Japan, the song opened at number 39 on the Oricon Combined Singles Chart for the period dated May 29 – June 4, and it went on to accrue over 3 million streams as the 40th most-streamed song in the country that week.

== Music video ==
=== Background ===
An accompanying music video for the song was created by Soyeon, while it was directed by Son Seung-hee. It was uploaded to the group's official YouTube channel in conjunction with the album's release. The video was preceded an image teaser released one day earlier, on May 14. Upon release, the music video was ranked first on the YouTube's trending list and garnered 13 million views in less than 24 hours. On June 3, after 18 days of its release, it became the fastest k-pop music video to surpass 100 million views in 2023.

=== Synopsis ===
A screenshot of a scene from the music video that references the 2004 American movie White Chicks.

The video is considered a condition for the pre-release track "Allergy". As the latter, it was created by Soyeon, who took heavy inspiration from the American movie I Feel Pretty as well as Y2K fashion. The video also took the form of a comedy movie with "retro vibes", and shots that are similar to a "music drama". (Note: As quoted from the Korea Times, a music drama is "a short drama-like video with background music that enjoyed popularity in Korea in the late 2000s".) The story begins with "Allergy", in which "Soyeon wants to be like the four other queen bees and continuously compares herself with others". Then she decided to go under the knife to be pretty like the "popular girls". The story continues with "Queencard", where she is the main protagonist and goes by the name SY. It opens with her entering an operating room for plastic surgery. But before the surgery starts, she realizes that she doesn't need it, thus being singled out as the "ordinary" one in the group. The video then cuts to the rest of (G)I-dle, where they enjoy the "party and bask in their popularity", in which they reference the "dance-off scene" in the American movie White Chicks. At the end of the video, Soyeon realizes that "true beauty comes from self-confidence after finding out that even the queen bees have their own insecurities and compare themselves with others." Nylon named the music video as the best of 2023, describing it as campy, highlighting how it draws inspiration from satirical comedies like Mean Girls and White Chicks, embodying a playful tone while also delivering a "sharp" critique of celebrity culture.

== Promotion ==
Prior to the release of I Feel, on May 15, the group held a live event called "production presentation" to introduce the album and its songs, including the lead single "Queencard". On May 18, they performed the song live for the first time on M Countdown. Later, the group performed the song on several South Korea music shows including Music Bank on May 19, Show! Music Core on May 20, Inkigayo on May 21, and The Show on May 23.

== Accolades ==
(G)I-dle won a total of 13 first-place trophies on all six South Korean music shows, receiving their first music show grand slam. They became the first girl group, the second group overall and the last to win the Quintuple Crown on Show! Music Core since it was implemented in February 2021. It also received a Melon Popularity Award for the week of June 19, 2023.

Awards and nominations for "Queencard"
Award ceremony	Year	Category	Result	Ref.
Circle Chart Music Awards	2024	Artist of the Year – Global Streaming	Won	
Circle Chart Music Awards	2024	Artist of the Year – Digital	Won	
Circle Chart Music Awards	2024	Artist of the Year – Streaming Unique Listeners	Won	
Golden Disc Awards	2024	Digital Song Bonsang	Won	
Golden Disc Awards	2024	Digital Daesang	Nominated	
MAMA Awards	2023	Song of the Year	Nominated	
MAMA Awards	2023	Best Music Video	Nominated	
MAMA Awards	2023	Best Dance Performance – Female Group	Nominated	
Melon Music Awards	2023	Song of the Year	Nominated	

Music program awards for "Queencard"
Program	Date	Ref.
Inkigayo	May 28, 2023	
Inkigayo	June 4, 2023	
Inkigayo	June 11, 2023	
M Countdown	May 25, 2023	
Music Bank	May 26, 2023	
Music Bank	July 14, 2023	
Show! Music Core	May 27, 2023	
Show! Music Core	June 3, 2023	
Show! Music Core	June 10, 2023	
Show! Music Core	June 24, 2023	
Show! Music Core	July 1, 2023	
Show Champion	May 24, 2023	
The Show	May 23, 2023	

== Credits and personnel ==
Credits adapted from album liner notes and High Quality Fish.

Song credits

- (G)I-dle – vocals
  - Soyeon – producer, lyrics, composition, arrangement, background vocals
- Kako – background vocals
- Pop Time – composition, arrangement, keyboard
- Daily – composition, arrangement, keyboard
- Likey – composition, arrangement
- Ryo – guitar, bass
- Choi Ye-ji (최예지) – recording (at Cube Studio)
- Jung Eun-kyung (정은경) – digital editing (at Ingrid Studio)
- Kang Sun-young (강선영) – engineer
- Gu Jong-pil (구종필) – mixing (at Klang Studio)
- Kwon Nam-woo (권남우) – mastering (at 821 Sound Mastering)
- Yoo Eun-jin (유은진) – assistant mastering (at 821 Sound Mastering)

Visual credits

- Tae-eun – choreographer
- ShaSha – choreographer
- Son Seung-hee (Samsons) (High Quality Fish) – music video director, production supervisor, editing
- High Quality Fish – executive producer
- Jungho Kee – producer
- Yuchang Lee – line producer
- Bom Lee, Tae-jung Kim, Chan-hyeok Park, Yu-seok Jung, Won-seong Yoon – production assistants
- Jung-ae Lee, Hui jin Kim, Hong-suk Jang ‐ art director (OH!ARTCREW)
- Young-hun Jin, Yong Kim, Hyo-joon Ahn, Hyeon Heo – art team
- Eun-woo Kim – acting teacher (TOV153 Acting Academy)

== Charts ==
=== Weekly charts ===
Weekly chart performance
Chart (2023)	Peak position
Global 200 (Billboard)	21
Hong Kong (Billboard)	7
Japan (Japan Hot 100)	47
Japan Combined Singles (Oricon)	39
Malaysia (Billboard)	10
Malaysia International (RIM)	7
New Zealand Hot Singles (RMNZ)	13
Singapore (RIAS)	3
South Korea (Circle)	1
Taiwan (Billboard)	1
UK Indie Breakers (OCC)	13
US World Digital Song Sales (Billboard)	9
Vietnam (Vietnam Hot 100)	31

=== Monthly charts ===
Monthly chart performance
Chart (2023)	Position
South Korea (Circle)	1

=== Year-end charts ===
2023 year-end chart performance for "Queencard"
Chart (2023)	Position
Global 200 (Billboard)	171
South Korea (Circle)	7

2024 year-end chart performance for "Queencard"
Chart (2024)	Position
South Korea (Circle)	56

== Certifications ==
Certifications
Region	Certification	Certified units/sales
Streaming
Japan (RIAJ)	Platinum	100,000,000^{†}
South Korea (KMCA)	Platinum	100,000,000^{†}
^{†} Streaming-only figures based on certification alone.

== Release history ==
Release history
Region	Date	Format	Label	Ref.
Various	May 15, 2023	Digital download; streaming	Cube; Kakao	

== See also ==
- List of Circle Digital Chart number ones of 2023
- List of The Show Chart winners (2023)
- List of Show Champion Chart winners (2023)
- List of M Countdown Chart winners (2023)
- List of Music Bank Chart winners (2023)
- List of Show! Music Core Chart winners (2023)
- List of Inkigayo Chart winners (2023)
