= Love Dive =

- Digital cover

Single album by Ive
- Released: April 5, 2022
- Length: 6:23
- Languages: Korean; English
- Labels: Starship; Kakao

Ive chronology
Eleven (2021)	Love Dive (2022)	After Like (2022)

Singles from Love Dive
- 1. "Love Dive" Released: April 5, 2022

Love Dive is the second single album by South Korean girl group Ive. The single album was released by Starship Entertainment on April 5, 2022, and contains two tracks, including the lead single of the same name.

The album debuted at number one on the weekly Gaon Album Chart, becoming Ive's second number-one album, and also topped the monthly chart for April, selling 544,339 copies in its first month of release. It has since been certified triple platinum by the Korea Music Content Association (KMCA) for surpassing 750,000 units.

== Background and release ==
On March 15, 2022, Starship Entertainment announced Ive would be releasing their second single album titled Love Dive on April 5. Three days later, the track listing was released, with "Love Dive" confirmed as the lead single. On March 21, a promotional video titled "Dear Cupid" was released. On April 4, the music video teaser for "Love Dive" was released. The highlight medley video was also released on the same day.

== Composition ==
The lead single "Love Dive" was described as a "dark modern" pop song with "addictive chorus and percussion sound" with lyrics that "reinterpret cupid of the new era planning to shine on the stage". The second track "Royal" was described as a dance-pop song with "groovy and funky house-type baseline" and "smooth and soulful synth sound" that "gives the elegant and intense [vibe] of catwalk in a fashion show". The song's rap lyrics was contributed by members Gaeul and Rei.

== Critical reception ==
Professional ratings
Review scores
Source	Rating
NME	4/5 stars

Tássia Assis from NME gave Love Dive a 4 out of 5 star rating, describing the single "Love Dive" as "the definite, luxurious plunge", which despite being "more subdued" than the group's previous single album "Eleven", is a "chaebol crush" that matches the extravagance and confidence that defines IVE. Assis then describes the B-side "Royal" as "classy", stating that "not only do [Ive] look expensive, but they also sound expensive", setting the overall tone of the single album as alluring and enticing. Uproxx named it one of The Best K-Pop Albums of 2022.

== Commercial performance ==
Love Dive debuted at number one on the week 15 issue of South Korea's Gaon Album Chart for the period dated April 3–9, 2022, and went on to top the April monthly chart with 544,339 cumulative copies sold. Per the year-end Circle Album Chart, it was the 21st best-selling album of 2022, having sold 861,185 copies overall.

== Track listing ==
Track listing for Love Dive
No.	Title	Lyrics	Music	Arrangement	Length
1.	"Love Dive"	Seo Ji-eum	Sophia Brennan; Elle Campbell; Nick Hahn	Nick Hahn	2:57
2.	"Royal"	Lee Seu-ran; Rick Bridges; Rei; Gaeul	Jamie Parker; Willie Weeks; Paulina Cerrilla; Kyler Niko	Jamie Parker; Willie Weeks	3:26
Total length:					6:23

== Charts ==
=== Weekly charts ===
Weekly chart performance
Chart (2022)	Peak position
South Korean Albums (Circle)	1

=== Monthly charts ===
Monthly chart performance
Chart (2022)	Peak position
South Korean Albums (Circle)	1

=== Year-end charts ===
Year-end chart performance
Chart (2022)	Position
South Korean Albums (Circle)	21

== Certifications and sales ==
Certifications and sales
Region	Certification	Certified units/sales
South Korea (KMCA)	Million	975,958

== Release history ==
Release history
Region	Date	Format	Label
South Korea	April 5, 2022	CD	Starship; Kakao
Various	April 5, 2022	Digital download; streaming	Starship; Kakao
