= Kristin Marie =

Kristin Marie Skolem
- Born: May 19, 1991 (age 33); Asker, Norway
- Genres: Pop, R&B
- Occupation(s): Singer, songwriter
- Instrument(s): Vocals, piano

Kristin Marie Skolem (born May 19, 1991), known professionally as Kristin Marie, is a Norwegian singer and songwriter.

In 2018 she co-wrote the winner song for the tenth season of Norwegian Idol, which was released by Universal Music. The song is named "Before I Go", and made it directly into the Spotify top 50 list, where it stayed for months. She has followed up with singles for international artists like Fedde Le Grande, Jamie, and Pentagon.

She attended the first year of LIMPI, a pop music school started in conjunction with Stargate, Magnus Beite, Amund Bjørklund of Espionage, and Lars Hustoft. During the year she was mentored by established professionals such as Fred Ball, Emily Warren, Martin Sjølie, Axident, Autumn Rowe, Tor Erik Hermansen, and Espen Lind among others.
