= NewJeans videography =

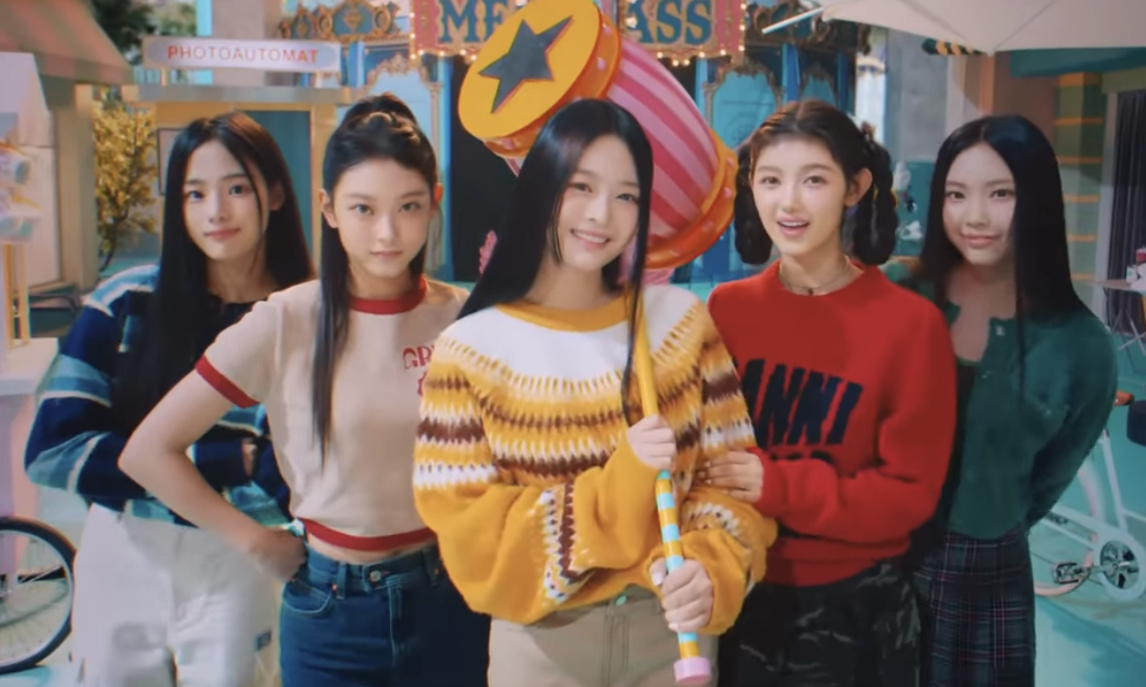
NewJeans in a commercial for MegaStudy in 2022

South Korean girl group NewJeans have appeared in 19 music videos and several commercials over the course of their career. Their first music video, "Attention", was surprise-released on July 22, 2022, through YouTube. To promote their first extended play (EP) New Jeans (2022), they released music videos for all the tracks — "Attention", "Hype Boy", Cookie" and "Hurt". Three music videos for the songs "Ditto" and "OMG" accompanied their next release, the single album OMG (2023). In 2023, they released music videos for all the tracks — "New Jeans", "Super Shy", "Cool with You", "ETA", "Get Up" and "ASAP" — of their second EP Get Up (2023).

== Music videos ==
Title	Year	Director	Notes	Ref.
"Attention"	2022	Shin Hee-won		
"Hype Boy" (Intro)	2022	Dongle Shin		
"Hype Boy" (Minji ver.)	2022	Dongle Shin		
"Hype Boy" (Hanni ver.)	2022	Dongle Shin		
"Hype Boy" (Danielle & Haerin ver.)	2022	Dongle Shin		
"Hype Boy" (Hyein ver.)	2022	Dongle Shin		
"Hurt"	2022	Shin Hee-won		
"Cookie"	2022	Dongle Shin		
"Ditto" (side A)	2022	Shin Woo-seok		
"Ditto" (side B)	2022	Shin Woo-seok		
"Hurt" (250 remix)	2022	Shin Hee-won		
"OMG"	2023	Shin Woo-seok		
"Zero"	2023	Sung-hwi	Promoting Coca-Cola Zero Sugar	
"New Jeans"	2023	Youngeum Lee		
"Super Shy"	2023	Shin Hee-won		
"Cool With You" (side A)	2023	Shin Woo-seok		
"Cool With You" & "Get Up" (side B)	2023	Shin Woo-seok		
"ETA"	2023	Shin Woo-seok	Promoting iPhone 14 Pro	
"ASAP"	2023	Jakyoung Kim		
"Bubble Gum"	2024	Youngeum Lee		
"How Sweet"	2024	Shin Hee-won		
"Right Now"	2024	Youngeum Lee		
"Supernatural" (Part 1)	2024	Dongle Shin		
"Supernatural" (Part 2)	2024	Dongle Shin		

== Commercials ==
Company	Year	Title	Director	Promoting	Region	Notes	Ref.
SK Telecom	2022	"Attention! New0을 위한 iPhone 14 Pro"	Kim Min-sung	iPhone 14 Pro	South Korea		
MegaStudy	2022	"수능도, 내신도! 2024 0원 메가패스"	Lee Han-gyeol	Megapass	South Korea		
Shinhan Bank	2022	"My Heart's Instinct" / "Story Instinct"	N/A	New Sol	South Korea	Won Customer Satisfaction Award at the 2022 Hankyung Advertising Awards	
Coca-Cola Company	2023	—N/a	Sung-hwi	Coca-Cola Zero Sugar	South Korea	Featuring "Zero"	
McDonald's	2023	"뉴진스도 춤추게 하는 빠삭함, 맥크리스피!"	N/A	McCrispy	South Korea		
Hyundai Department Store	2023	"NewJeans, 현대백화점을 면세하다"	Jeon Mun-young	Duty Free Shop	South Korea		
SK Telecom	2023	"0을 위한 특별한 베네핏, Made in 0"	Hobin	iPhone 15 Pro	South Korea		
Lotte Wellfood	2023	"Say Hello with Pepero"	N/A	Pepero	United States		
Lotte Wellfood	2023	"Hello, New Me" / "これガムイタガム"	N/A	Itagum	Japan	Featuring "OMG"	
Shinhan Bank	2023	"신한 X 뉴진스 새로운 금융의 시작"	Lee Hyun-ji	Super Sol	South Korea		
Kao Corporation	2024	"A sparkling morning begins"	N/A	Essential Premium	Japan	Featuring "Bubble Gum"	
Lotte Wellfood	2024	"This is おいしい Zero"	N/A	Zero	Japan	Featuring "Right Now"	
SK Telecom	2024	—N/a	N/A	iPhone 16 Pro	South Korea		
Indofood	2024	"Oh My Good! It's Indomie"	N/A	Indomie	Indonesia		

== Other releases ==
Title	Album details	Ref.
NewJeans Yearbook 22-23	Released: November 30, 2023; Label: ADOR, Hybe; Format: VOD	
