= List of NewJeans live performances =

NewJeans live performances
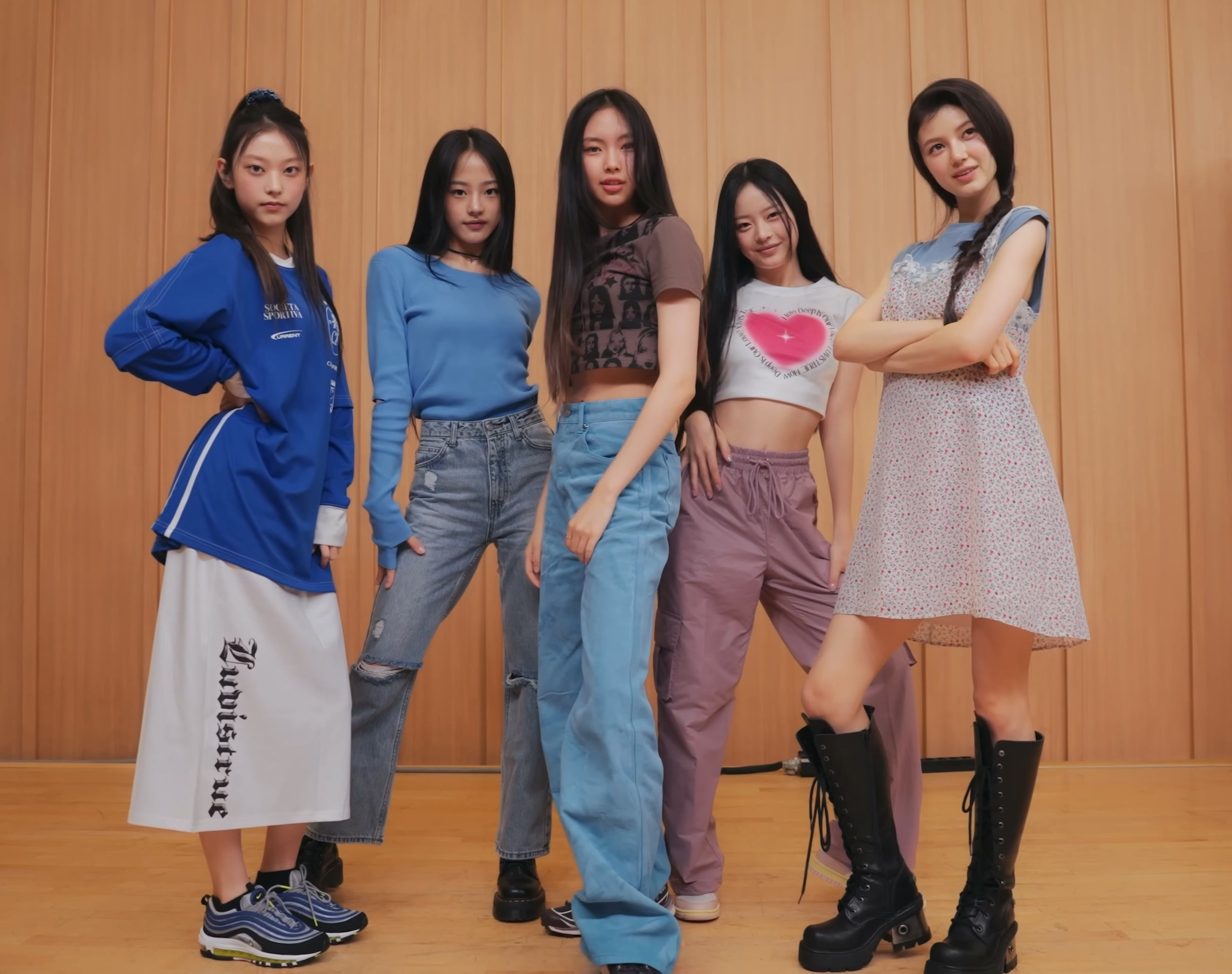
- NewJeans in 2022
- Fan meetings: 2

NewJeans, a South Korean idol girl group, has staged two fan meetings since their debut in 2022. To promote their first self-titled EP, they appeared on numerous South Korean music shows in August 2022. In July 2023, the group held their first fan meeting, titled Bunnies Camp, in Seoul, South Korea. Following the release of their second EP, Get Up (2023), they promoted it with live performances on South Korean music shows. Internationally, they performed at Lollapalooza in the US in July and Summer Sonic Festival in Japan in August 2023.

Their second fan meeting, titled Bunnies Camp 2024, was held at the Tokyo Dome in Japan. The event lasted two days in June 2024 and attracted 91,200 people in attendance. The group has also performed at various award shows, including the Blue Dragon Film Awards and the Melon Music Awards. They also participated in miscellaneous events, such as the Tokyo Girls Collection and a series of university festivals in South Korea.

== Fan meetings ==
Title	Dates	Venue	City	Country
Bunnies Camp	July 1–2, 2023	SK Olympic Handball Gymnasium (Note: Also broadcast live on Weverse)	Seoul	South Korea
Bunnies Camp was NewJeans's first sold-out fan meeting, held ahead of the release of their second extended play (EP), Get Up (2023). Consisting of two shows, the scout-themed event featured an "immersive" stage and sound design reminiscent of a camping site and followed the timeline of a traditional scouts' meeting. Both shows lasted two hours and a half, during which NewJeans interacted with fans through games and performed seven of their songs: "Attention", "Cookie", "Hype Boy", "Hurt" (250 remix), "Ditto" (Acoustic version; 1998 choreography version), "OMG", and an unreleased single from Get Up, "ETA". The members also sat around a mock-campfire and individually covered five songs: "Wi Ing Wi Ing" by Hyukoh (Minji), "Like Yesterday" by J.ae (Hanni), "Paris in the Rain" by Lauv (Danielle), "Time Spent Walking Through Memories" by Nell (Haerin), and "Youth" by Oohyo (Hyein). The show was well received by audiences and reviewers alike, with South Korean news site Edaily hailing it as the "greatest fan meeting ever" and Teen Vogue describing it as "a thorough look back on their momentous year [...] but also a moreish taster of what's to come".
Bunnies Camp 2024 Tokyo Dome	June 26–27, 2024	Tokyo Dome	Tokyo	Japan
Bunnies Camp 2024 Tokyo Dome was NewJeans's second sold-out fan meeting and their first solo performance in Japan. The shows lasted two hours and half each, during which NewJeans performed 24 songs. NewJeans's long-time collaborator, South Korean producer 250, served as the opening act, while Yoasobi and Rina Sawayama made guest appearances. Visuals and merchandise related to the event were created in collaboration with Takashi Murakami. They became the foreign artist with the shortest time to debut at Tokyo Dome (1 year 11 months), and the two-day event attracted 91,200 people in attendance. The set list was as follows: Setlist: 1. "Attention"; 2. "Cookie"; 3. "Hold It Down" (Hanni and Danielle); 4. "Heel Dance" (Haerin); 5. "Hype Boy"; 6. "Hurt" (250 remix); 7. "New Jeans"; 8. "Super Shy"; 9. "Get Up"; 10. "Cool with You"; 11. "Odoriko" by Vaundy (Minji cover); 12. "Plastic Love" by Mariya Takeuchi (Hyein cover) (day 1) / "Bad Friend" (Hyein cover, with Rina Sawayama) (day 2); 13. "Butterflies (With U)" (Danielle); 14. "Aoi Sangoshou" by Seiko Matsuda (Hanni cover); 15. "Bubble Gum"; 16. "Right Now"; 17. "Biri-Biri" (with Yoasobi) (day 1); 18. "Idol" (Yoasobi only) (day 1); 19. "ETA"; 20. "How Sweet"; 21. "Supernatural"; 22. "OMG"; 23. "Ditto"; 24. "ASAP"

== Joint tours, concerts, and music festivals ==
Event	Date	Venue	City	Country	Performed song(s)	Ref.
KCON	October 1, 2022	The Boulevard	Riyadh	Saudi Arabia	"Attention", "Hype Boy", and "Cookie"	
KCON	October 15, 2022	Ariake Arena	Tokyo	Japan	"Attention" and "Hype Boy"	
KBS Song Festival	December 16, 2022	Jamsil Indoor Stadium	Seoul	South Korea	"Love Like Oxygen" (Shinee cover), (Note: Performed by Minji and Hyein with Ive member Leeseo, Le Sserafim member Hong Eunchae, and Nmixx member Sullyoon) "Attention", and "Hype Boy"	
SBS Gayo Daejeon	December 24, 2022	Gocheok Sky Dome	Seoul	South Korea	Intro, "Attention", and "Tell Me" (Remix; Wonder Girls cover)	
Weverse Con Festival	June 11, 2023	KSPO Dome	Seoul	South Korea	Intro, "OMG", "Ditto", "Attention", "Hype Boy", and "Cookie"	
Lollapalooza	August 3, 2023	Grant Park	Chicago	United States	"Hype Boy", "Cookie" (Rock version), "Hurt", "Attention", "Ditto", "OMG", "New Jeans", "Super Shy", "ETA", "Cool with You", "Get Up", and "ASAP"	
K-pop Super Live	August 11, 2023	Seoul World Cup Stadium	Seoul	South Korea	"ETA" and "Hype Boy"	
Summer Sonic Festival	August 19, 2023	Zozo Marine Stadium	Chiba	Japan	"Ditto", "OMG", "Cookie, "Attention", "Hype Boy", "New Jeans", "Super Shy", "ETA", "Cool with You", "Get Up", and "ASAP"	
Superpop	October 7–8, 2023	Pia Arena MM	Yokohama	Japan	"Be Who You Are (Real Magic)" (with Jon Batiste), "Zero", "Hype Boy", "Cookie", "Ditto", "OMG", "New Jeans", "Super Shy", and "ETA"	
Music Bank in Mexico	October 22, 2023	Palacio de los Deportes	Mexico City	Mexico	"Hype Boy", "OMG", "New Jeans", "Super Shy", "ETA", "Part of Your World", (Note: Sung by Danielle) and "Recuérdame" (Note: Sung by Hanni and (G)I-dle member Minnie)	
Music Bank Global Festival	December 9, 2023	Belluna Dome	Tokorozawa	Japan	"OMG", "Ditto", "New Jeans", "Super Shy", and "ETA"	
Music Bank Global Festival	December 15, 2023	KBS Hall	Seoul	South Korea	"OMG", "Ditto", "New Jeans", "Super Shy", and "ETA"	
SBS Gayo Daejeon	December 25, 2023	Inspire Arena	Incheon	South Korea	"New Jeans", "ETA", "Ditto", and "OMG" (FRNK remix)	
Korea on Stage	May 21, 2024	Gyeongbokgung Palace	Seoul	South Korea	"Cool with You", (Note: Their performance of "Cool with You" was pre-recorded and later broadcast at the event.) "Ditto", "ETA", and "Super Shy"	
K-Wave Concert Inkigayo	June 2, 2024	Inspire Arena	Incheon	South Korea	"How Sweet", "Bubble Gum", and "ETA"	
SBS Gayo Daejeon Summer	July 24, 2024	Inspire Arena	Incheon	South Korea	"How Sweet" and "Supernatural"	
The Ultimate Fandom Concert	September 5, 2024	SM Mall of Asia Arena	Bay City	Philippines	"ETA", "Bubble Gum", "Supernatural", "How Sweet", and "Zero"	
Coke Studio Live 2024	October 19–20, 2024	Saitama Super Arena	Saitama	Japan	"Attention", "Ditto", "OMG", "ETA", "Zero", "How Sweet", and "Supernatural"	
SBS Gayo Daejeon	December 25, 2024	Inspire Arena	Incheon	South Korea	"Ditto" (250 remix), "Cookie", and "Hype Boy"	
Music Bank Global Festival	December 14, 2024	Fukuoka Dome	Fukuoka	Japan	"Super Shy", "How Sweet", and "Supernatural"	
Countdown Japan	December 31, 2024	Makuhari Messe	Chiba	Japan	"OMG" (FRNK Remix), "Cookie", "Right Now", "Supernatural", "Hype Boy", "ETA", "How Sweet", "Bubble Gum" and "Ditto"	
ComplexCon 2025 (Note: First and only performance as NJZ)	March 23, 2025	AsiaWorld–Expo	Hong Kong	China	"Pit Stop", "No Scrubs" (Danielle, TLC cover), "Smile For The Camera" (Minji, Upsahl cover), "Dontcha" (Haerin, The Internet cover), "Use Your Heart" (Hyein, SWV cover), and "My Boo" (Hanni, Ghost Town DJ's cover)	

== Awards shows ==
Event	Date	Venue	City	Country	Performed song(s)	Ref.
49th Korea Broadcasting Awards	September 5, 2022	KBS Hall	Seoul	South Korea	N/A	
2022 The Fact Music Awards	October 8, 2022	KBS Hall	Seoul	South Korea	Intro, "Hype Boy", and "Attention"	
43rd Blue Dragon Film Awards	November 25, 2022	KBS Hall	Seoul	South Korea	"Hype Boy" and "Attention"	
2022 Melon Music Awards	November 26, 2022	Gocheok Sky Dome	Seoul	South Korea	"Cookie", "Hype Boy", and "Attention"	
2022 MAMA Awards	November 29, 2022	Kyocera Dome	Osaka	Japan	"Eleven", "Fearless", "O.O", "Hype Boy", "Wa Da Da", and "Cheer Up" (Various covers; with Ive, Le Sserafim, Kep1er, and Nmixx)	
2022 MAMA Awards	November 30, 2022	Kyocera Dome	Osaka	Japan	"Attention", "Cookie", "Hurt", and "Hype Boy"	
2022 Asia Artist Awards	December 13, 2022	Nippon Gaishi Hall	Nagoya	Japan	"Attention"	
2022 SBS Entertainment Awards	December 17, 2022	SBS Prism Tower	Seoul	South Korea	"Attention" (with FC Balladream)	
37th Golden Disc Awards	January 7, 2023	Rajamangala Stadium	Bangkok	Thailand	"Attention" (Golden Disc version), "Hype Boy", and "OMG"	
2023 The Fact Music Awards	October 10, 2023	Namdong Gymnasium	Incheon	South Korea	"Super Shy" and "ETA"	
2023 Billboard Music Awards	November 19, 2023	N/A (Note: All performances were broadcast online from various locations.)			"Super Shy" and "OMG"	
44th Blue Dragon Film Awards	November 24, 2023	KBS Hall	Seoul	South Korea	"ETA" and "Super Shy"	
2023 Melon Music Awards	December 2, 2023	Inspire Arena	Incheon	South Korea	"New Jeans", "Super Shy", "ETA", "Cool with You", "Get Up", and "ASAP"	
2023 Asia Artist Awards	December 14, 2023	Philippine Arena	Bocaue	Philippines	"OMG", "ETA", and "Super Shy"	
65th Japan Record Awards	December 30, 2023	New National Theatre	Tokyo	Japan	"Ditto", "ETA", and "New Jeans"	
38th Golden Disc Awards	January 6, 2024	Jakarta International Stadium	Jakarta	Indonesia	"Cool with You" and "Ditto"	
2024 Billboard Women in Music	March 6, 2024	YouTube Theater	Inglewood	United States	"Super Shy" and "ETA"	
2024 The Fact Music Awards	September 8, 2024	Kyocera Dome	Osaka	Japan	"ETA", "OMG", "Attention", and "Bubble Gum" (Japanese version)	
2024 Korea Grand Music Awards	November 16, 2024	Inspire Arena	Incheon	South Korea	"Right Now", "Bubble Gum", "How Sweet", and "Supernatural"	
2024 Asia Artist Awards	December 27, 2024	Impact Challenger Hall	Bangkok	Thailand	"Bubble Gum", "Supernatural", and "How Sweet"	
66th Japan Record Awards	December 30, 2024	N/A		Japan	"Supernatural"	
39th Golden Disc Awards	January 5, 2025	Mizuho PayPay Dome	Fukuoka	Japan	"Supernatural" and "How Sweet"	

== Television shows and specials ==
Event	Date	Country	Performed song(s)	Ref.
M Countdown	August 4, 2022	South Korea	"Attention", "Hype Boy", and Cookie"	
Music Bank	August 5, 2022	South Korea	"Attention"	
Inkigayo	August 7, 2022	South Korea	"Attention" and "Cookie"	
M Countdown	August 11, 2022	South Korea	"Attention"	
Music Bank	August 12, 2022	South Korea	"Hype Boy"	
Inkigayo	August 14, 2022	South Korea	"Attention"	
Music Bank	August 19, 2022	South Korea	"Hype Boy" and "Hurt"	
Inkigayo	August 21, 2022	South Korea	"Hype Boy"	
M Countdown	August 25, 2022	South Korea	"Hype Boy"	
Music Bank	August 26, 2022	South Korea	"Hurt"	
Inkigayo	August 28, 2022	South Korea	"Hurt"	
2022 Nippon Television Music Festival	December 28, 2022	Japan	"Attention"	
Inkigayo	January 15, 2023	South Korea	"Ditto" and "OMG"	
Music Bank	January 20, 2023	South Korea	"Ditto" and "OMG"	
Music Bank	January 27, 2023	South Korea	"Ditto" and "OMG"	
Inkigayo	January 29, 2023	South Korea	"OMG"	
NTV The Music Day 2023	July 1, 2023	Japan	"Ditto"	
2023 FNS Music Festival	July 12, 2023	Japan	"Ditto"	
Music Bank	July 14, 2023	South Korea	"Super Shy" and "New Jeans"	
TBS The Music Day 2023	July 15, 2023	Japan	"OMG" and "Automatic" (Hikaru Utada cover)	
Inkigayo	July 16, 2023	South Korea	"Super Shy" and "New Jeans"	
Music Bank	July 21, 2023	South Korea	"Super Shy", "Cool with You", and ETA"	
Inkigayo	July 23, 2023	South Korea	"Cool with You" and "ETA"	
Music Bank	July 28, 2023	South Korea	"ETA"	
Inkigayo	July 30, 2023	South Korea	"ETA"	
Music Bank	August 4, 2023	South Korea	"ETA"	
Inkigayo	August 6, 2023	South Korea	"Super Shy"	
Inkigayo	August 13, 2023	South Korea	"Cool with You"	
Music Bank	August 25, 2023	South Korea	"ASAP"	
Inkigayo	August 27, 2023	South Korea	"ASAP"	
NHK Music Expo 2023	September 14, 2023	Japan	"ETA"	
Venue101 Presents NewJeans Get Up Live	October 21, 2023	Japan	"New Jeans", "Super Shy", and "ETA"	
The Song I Listened to the Most This Year	December 27, 2023	Japan	"Super Shy" and "OMG"	
74th NHK Kōhaku Uta Gassen	December 31, 2023	Japan	"OMG", "ETA", and "Ditto"	
Dick Clark's New Year's Rockin' Eve	December 31, 2023	United States	"Super Shy" and "ETA"	
Music Bank	May 24, 2024	South Korea	"How Sweet" and "Bubble Gum"	
Inkigayo	May 26, 2024	South Korea	"How Sweet" and "Bubble Gum"	
Music Bank	May 31, 2024	South Korea	"How Sweet"	
Music Bank	June 7, 2024	South Korea	"How Sweet"	
Music Bank	June 14, 2024	South Korea	"Bubble Gum"	
Inkigayo	June 16, 2024	South Korea	"Bubble Gum"	
Mezamashi TV	June 21, 2024	Japan	"Supernatural"	
Mezamashi 8	June 21, 2024	Japan	"Bubble Gum"	
Music Station	June 21, 2024	Japan	"Supernatural" and "OMG"	
With Music	June 22, 2024	Japan	"Right Now", "Supernatural", and "Bubble Gum"	
CDTV Live! Live!	June 24, 2024	Japan	"Supernatural"	
Venue 101	June 29, 2024	Japan	"Supernatural"	
CDTV Live! Live!	July 1, 2024	Japan	"How Sweet" and "Bubble Gum"	
2024 FNS Summer Music Festival	July 3, 2024	Japan	"ETA", "OMG", and "Supernatural"	
NTV The Music Day 2024	July 6, 2024	Japan	"Hype Boy", "Aoi Sangoshō" (Seiko Matsuda cover), (Note: Sung by Hanni) "How Sweet", and "Plastic Love" (Mariya Takeuchi cover) (Note: Sung by Hyein)	
Music Bank	July 12, 2024	South Korea	"Right Now" and "Supernatural"	
Show! Music Core	July 13, 2024	South Korea	"Right Now", "Supernatural", "ETA", "OMG", and "Hype Boy"	
Inkigayo	July 14, 2024	South Korea	"Right Now" and "Supernatural"	
With Music	August 17, 2024	Japan	"Supernatural" and "ETA"	
CDTV Live! Live! Summer Festival SP	August 19, 2024	Japan	"Odoriko" (Vaundy cover), (Note: Sung by Minji) "The Seasons in the Sun" (Tube cover), "Cherry" (Spitz cover), "Part of Your World", "Automatic" (Hikaru Utada cover), (Note: Sung by Haerin) and "Supernatural"	
With Music	November 9, 2024	Japan	"OMG"	
Music Station	November 29, 2024	Japan	"Ditto" and "How Sweet"	
Best Artist 2024	November 30, 2024	Japan	"Supernatural"	
2024 FNS Music Festival	December 4, 2024	Japan	"How Sweet" and "Ditto"	
CDTV Live! Live!	December 12, 2024	Japan	"Supernatural" and "OMG"	
The Song I Listened to the Most This Year	December 28, 2024	Japan	N/A	
MBC Gayo Daejejeon	January 29, 2025 (Note: Originally scheduled for December 31, 2024, but was delayed due to Jeju Air Flight 2216)	South Korea	"Attention"	

== Other live performances ==
Event	Date	Venue	City	Country	Performed song(s)	Ref.
36th Tokyo Girls Collection	March 4, 2023	Yoyogi National Gymnasium	Tokyo	Japan	"Hype Boy", "Ditto", and "OMG"	
56th Asian Development Bank Annual Meeting	May 3, 2023	Songdo Convensia	Incheon	South Korea	"Ditto" and "OMG"	
2023 League of Legends World Championship	November 19, 2023	Gocheok Sky Dome	Seoul	South Korea	"Gods"	
NewJeans at Nike Orchard Road	February 3, 2024	Nike's store on Orchard Road	Singapore		"Ditto", "New Jeans", "ETA", and "OMG"	
IU H.E.R. World Tour	March 2, 2024	KSPO Dome	Seoul	South Korea	"Ditto", "ETA", and "Shh.."	
Coke Studio Live with NewJeans	June 4, 2024	N/A	Tokyo	Japan	"Zero", "Ditto" (250 remix), "New Jeans", "ETA", "Bubble Gum", and "How Sweet"	
Halftime show at the Tottenham Hotspur–Bayern Munich match	August 3, 2024	Seoul World Cup Stadium	Seoul	South Korea	"Attention", "Hype Boy", "ETA", and "Super Shy"	
2024 Paris Olympics encouragement event	August 22, 2024	N/A	Seoul	South Korea	N/A	
Chō-genjitsu Asia Tour	December 7, 2024	Inspire Arena	Incheon	South Korea	"How Sweet", "Right Now" (with Ikura), and "Biri-Biri" (with Ikura)	
