= Right Now (NewJeans song) =

2024 song by NewJeans

Song by NewJeans

from the album Supernatural
- Language: Japanese; English; Korean
- A-side: "Supernatural"
- Released: June 21, 2024
- Genre: Drum and bass
- Length: 2:40
- Label: ADOR
- Composers: Lolo Zouaï; Park Jin-su
- Lyricists: Lolo Zouaï; Satomoka; Gigi
- Producer: Park Jin-su

Music video
- "Right Now" on YouTube

"Right Now" is a song recorded by South Korean girl group NewJeans. It was released by ADOR on June 21, 2024 as a B-side to the group's third single album, Supernatural (2024). Along with the A-side, "Supernatural", it marked the group's debut in the Japanese music market. Its accompanying music video, in collaboration with Takashi Murakami, was released on June 17, 2024, prior to the single album's release.

== Background ==
After debuting in 2022, South Korean girl group NewJeans had their international breakthrough in 2023 with the release of the single album OMG and their second extended play (EP), Get Up. In January 2023, NewJeans entered the Billboard Hot 100 for the first time with the singles "Ditto" and "OMG". In South Korea, "Ditto" became the most successful song of the year, topping the Circle Digital Chart for a record-breaking thirteen weeks, receiving numerous accolades, and introducing the breakbeat trend in the K-pop music industry. Released in July 2023, Get Up internationally established NewJeans as one of the most prominent music acts of the year, becoming the group's first entry and number-one on the Billboard 200, selling over two million copies, and being named among the best albums of 2023 by several publications.

== Music and lyrics ==
"Right Now" is a drum and bass track featuring lyrics in Japanese, English, and Korean. The Korea Times described the song as "something closer to [...] the Sambass subgenre."

== Release and promotion ==
A teaser for the music video of the track was released on May 1, 2024; it served to announce a collaboration with Japanese visual artist Takashi Murakami, who worked with NewJeans to create the music video and design artwork for the CD single. Murakami had previously declared himself a "huge fan of NewJeans" and expressed his desire to meet them in January 2023.

A snippet of the track became available on May 9, 2024, after being featured in Lotte Wellfood's advertisement for their dessert brand Zero starring NewJeans.

== Music video ==
The music video for "Right Now" was released on June 17, 2024, prior to the single album's release. Directed by Lee Youngeum and produced by Min Hee-jin in collaboration with Takashi Murakami, it follows the animated characters version of NewJeans, designed in the style of The Powerpuff Girls, influenced by their signature flower character, Kaikai Kiki, and first introduced in the music video for their 2023 track "New Jeans". It begins with Hanni taking the initiative to invite her crush for a movie night, but receiving only a flower emoji in reply prompts the group to embark on a joint quest to interpret the colorful emoji's meaning. The song's second verse, "Your chance is here and now", delivers a reminder about the urgency of romantic opportunities. The video ends with the ominous three-dots indicating the other person is still typing.

Upon release, the music video accumulated approximately 7 million views.

== Commercial performance ==
The track debuted at number 15 on Billboard's Hits of the World chart for South Korea and peaked at number 46 on the Billboard Global Excl. US in the chart issue dated July 6, 2024.

== Credits and personnel ==
Credits are adapted from Tidal.

- NewJeans – vocals
- Gigi – writer
- Lolo Zouaï – composer, writer, background vocals
- Satomoka – writer
- Park Jinsu – composer, producer
- Nathan Boddy – mixing engineer
- Dale Becker – mastering engineer
- Lilian Nuthall – assistant mixing engineer

== Charts ==
=== Weekly charts ===
Weekly chart performance
Chart (2024)	Peak position
Global 200 (Billboard)	81
Hong Kong (Billboard)	23
Japan (Japan Hot 100)	47
New Zealand Hot Singles (RMNZ)	19
South Korea (Circle)	25
Taiwan (Billboard)	20
US World Digital Song Sales (Billboard)	6

=== Monthly charts ===
Monthly chart performance
Chart (2024)	Position
South Korea (Circle)	37

=== Year-end charts ===
Year-end chart performance
Chart (2024)	Position
South Korea (Circle)	200
