= 2023 Melon Music Awards =

2023 South Korean music award ceremony

- Title card
- Date: December 2, 2023
- Venue: Inspire Arena
- Country: South Korea
- Hosted by: An Yu-jin

Highlights
- Most wins: NewJeans (5)
- Most nominations: Aespa; Ive; NewJeans (7 each)
- Website: melon.com/mma/info.htm

Television/radio coverage
- Network: Melon; Wavve; Abema; Beyond Live

The 2023 Melon Music Awards (Korean: 2023 멜론 뮤직어워드) was an awards ceremony held on December 2, 2023. It was organized by Melon, and Kakao Entertainment and broadcast through Melon, and Wavve in South Korea, Abema in Japan, and Beyond Live in selected regions. The ceremony was hosted by An Yu-jin, with pre-ceremony red carpet event hosted by Hitomi Honda, Nako Yabuki, and Ha Ji-young.

NewJeans won five awards, with two Daesangs for Song of the Year and Artist of the Year. Ive won Album of the Year while Record of the Year went to NCT Dream.

== Criteria ==
All songs and albums that are eligible to be nominated must be released from November 4, 2022, to November 1, 2023.

Category	Digital sales	Online voting	Panelist
Top 10 Artist	80%	20%	N/A
Millions Top 10 Album	80%	20%	N/A
Album of the Year	60%	20%	20%
Artist of the Year	60%	20%	20%
Song of the Year	60%	20%	20%
Record of the Year	N/A		100%
Rookie of the Year	60%	20%	20%
Best Pop Artist	60%	20%	20%
Best Male Solo	60%	20%	20%
Best Female Solo	60%	20%	20%
Best Male Group	60%	20%	20%
Best Female Group	60%	20%	20%
Best OST	60%	20%	20%
Best Music Style	20%	20%	60%
Hot Trend Award	70%	N/A	30%
Favorite Star Award	N/A	80%	20%
Stage of the Year	N/A		100%
Music Video of the Year	N/A		100%
Songwriter Award	N/A		100%
J-pop Favorite Artist	N/A		100%
Best Male Performance	N/A		100%
Best Female Performance	N/A		100%
Global Artist	N/A		100%
Global Rising Artist	N/A		100%

== Winners and nominees ==
The list of nominees for Top 10 Artists was announced on November 2, 2023, through the official website. Voting took place from November 2 to 16. The remaining categories, excluding Record of the Year and Hot Trend Award, were announced on November 17. Voting began that same day, and ended on December 1.

Winners and nominees are listed in alphanumerical order, with winners listed first and emphasized in bold.

=== Main awards ===
List of winners and nominees for the main awards
**Album of the Year** **(Daesang)**: **Ive – I've Ive**; (G)I-dle – I Feel; Aespa – My World; Le Sserafim – Unforgiven; NewJeans – Get Up; List of longlisted nominees: Jimin – Face; NCT Dream – ISTJ; Parc Jae-jung – Alone; Seventeen – FML; Tomorrow X Together – The Name Chapter: Temptation	**Artist of the Year** **(Daesang)**: **NewJeans**; Aespa; Ive; Le Sserafim; NCT Dream; List of longlisted nominees: (G)I-dle; BTS; Jung Kook; Lim Young-woong; Seventeen
**Song of the Year** **(Daesang)**: **NewJeans – "Ditto"**; (G)I-dle – "Queencard"; Aespa – "Spicy"; BSS – "Fighting" (featuring Lee Young-ji); Ive – "I Am"; List of longlisted nominees: Jisoo – "Flower"; Le Sserafim – "Unforgiven" (featuring Nile Rodgers); NCT Dream – "Candy"; Parc Jae-jung – "Let's Say Goodbye"; STAYC – "Teddy Bear"	**Record of the Year** **(Daesang)**: **NCT Dream**
**Top 10 Artist**: **(G)I-dle**; **Aespa**; **BTS**; **Ive**; **Jung Kook**; **Le Sserafim**; **Lim Young-woong**; **NCT Dream**; **NewJeans**; **Seventeen**; List of nominees: AKMU; Big Naughty; BSS; DK; Fifty Fifty; Huh Gak; Jimin; Jisoo; Lim Han-byul; NCT 127; Nmixx; Parc Jae-jung; Sin Ye-young; Song Ha-yea; STAYC; Suga; Taeyang; Tomorrow X Together; Woody; Zia	**Millions Top 10**: **(G)I-dle – I Feel**; **Aespa – My World**; **BSS – Second Wind**; **Ive – I've Ive**; **Jung Kook – "Seven" (featuring Latto)**; **Le Sserafim – Unforgiven**; **Lim Young-woong – "Do or Die"**; **NCT Dream – ISTJ**; **NewJeans – Get Up**; **Seventeen – FML**; List of nominees: Agust D – D-Day; BtoB – Wind and Wish; D.O. – Expectations; Exo – Exist; Isegye Idol – "Kidding"; Jimin – Face; Lee Chan-won – One; Lee Seung-yoon – Shelter of Dreams; Monsta X – Reason; NCT 127 – Ay-Yo; NCT DoJaeJung – Perfume; Plave – Asterum: The Shape of Things to Come; Shinee – Hard; Shownu X Hyungwon – The Unseen; Stray Kids – 5-Star; The Boyz – Be Awake; Tomorrow X Together – The Name Chapter: Temptation; V – Layover; Young Tak – Form; Zerobaseone – Youth in the Shade
**Best Male Solo**: **Jung Kook**; Big Naughty; DK; Lim Young-woong; Woody	**Best Female Solo**: **Lee Young-ji**; Jisoo; Sin Ye-young; Song Ha-yea; Zia
**Best Male Group**: **NCT Dream**; BTS; BSS; Seventeen; Tomorrow X Together	**Best Female Group**: **NewJeans**; (G)I-dle; Aespa; Ive; Le Sserafim
**New Artist of the Year**: **Riize**; **Zerobaseone**; BoyNextDoor; Kiss of Life; Plave	**Best Pop Artist**: **Charlie Puth**; Ed Sheeran; Post Malone; Sia; SZA
**Best OST**: **Lim Jae-hyun – "Heaven (2023)" (from Beginning is the First Kiss)**; Big Naughty – "With Me" (from The Interest of Love); Miyeon – "The Painted on the Moonlight" (from My Dearest); Paul Kim – "You Remember" (from The Glory); Younha – "Letter" (from Ditto)	**Best Music Style**: **Silica Gel – "Tik Tak Tok" (featuring So!YoON!)**; Bongjeingan – "Gaekkum"; Carina Nebula – "Good Match"; Dabda – "Flower Tail"; Youra – "The Cherry Trees" (수풀 연못 색 치마); List of longlisted nominees: Cloud's Block – "The Lake" (호수); Jclef – "Jonny's Sofa"; Lee Hyung-ju – "A Day My Body Lifted Pp" (내 몸이 들린 날); O'Domar – "Don't Think About Elephants" (코끼리는 생각하지 마); Parannoul – "Polaris" (북극성)
**Hot Trend Award**: **Jung Kook**; BSS; Jisoo; NCT DoJaeJung	**Kakao Favorite Star Award**: **BTS**; Aespa; Enhypen; Ive; Lim Young-woong; NCT Dream; NewJeans; Riize; Seventeen; Zerobaseone

=== Special awards ===
List of winners for the special awards
**Best Music Video**: **STAYC – "Bubble"**	**Best Producer**: **Han Sung-su** **(Pledis Entertainment)**	**Best Song Writer**: **Ryan S. Jhun (SM Entertainment)**
**Best Male Performance**: **Seventeen**	**Best Female Performance**: **Aespa**	**1theK Global Icon**: **Kiss of Life**
**Global Artist**: **Aespa**	**Global Rising Artist**: **BoyNextDoor**	**J-pop Favorite Artist**: **imase**
**Stage of the Year**: **Shinee – Shinee World VI: Perfect Illumination**

=== Multiple awards ===
The following artist(s) received three or more awards:

Count	Artist(s)
5	NewJeans
4	Aespa
4	Jung Kook
4	NCT Dream
3	Ive
3	Seventeen

== Performers ==
The list of performers were announced on November 8, November 13, November 15, November 22, and November 27, 2023.

List of performances
Artist(s)	Song(s) performed	Segment
Silica Gel	"Tik Tak Tok" + "No Pain"	TheLive – Brand New Sound
Kiss of Life	"Bad News"	Escape Ep. 1
Lee Young-ji	"I Am Lee Young-ji" + "Not Sorry" + "Fighting" + "Smoke"	abcdefxxx
STAYC	"Bubble" + "Teddy Bear"	On the String
BoyNextDoor	"Crying" + "But Sometimes"	ALoHomora
Riize	"Get a Guitar" + "Talk Saxy"	Rise & Realize
NewJeans	"New Jeans" + "Super Shy" + "ETA" + "Cool with You" + "Get Up" + "ASAP"	[Track]: NewJeans
Zerobaseone	"In Bloom" + "Crush"	My Most Radiant Now
Aespa	"Trick or Trick" + "Drama"	Top-notch Scene
imase	"Night Dancer"	With Me Again
Ive	"Baddie" + "Kitsch" + "Blue Blood" + "I Am"	Sekhmet
Shinee	"Sherlock (Clue + Note)" (Note: Performed by Taemin) + "View" (Note: Performed by Key) + "Dream Girl" (Note: Performed by Minho) + "Everybody + "Don't Call Me" + "Hard"	Shinee's Selection
NCT Dream	"Broken Melodies" + "Poison" + "ISTJ"	Re:reality

== Presenters ==
The list of presenters were announced on November 28, 2023.

- Lee Jun-young and Pyo Ye-jin – presented Top 10 Artist Award
- Park Jenny – presented J-pop Favorite Artist and Hot Trend
- Kim Jae-young – presented Top 10 Artist Award
- RalRal and Kim Ah-young – presented 1theK Global Icon and Best Female Group
- Choi Hyun-joon – presented Best Music Style and Best Female Performance
- Choo Ga-yeoul – presented Best Songwriter
- Lee Sang-yi – presented Stage of the Year
- Lee Chae-min and Shin Eun-soo – presented Millions Top 10 Artist
- Kwaktube – presented Best Female Solo and Best Male Group
- Jo Se-ho and Hong Jin-kyung – presented Best Music Video and Rookie of the Year
- Psick Univ – presented Global Artist and Global Rising Artist
- Jang Ki-yong and Chun Woo-hee – presented Song of the Year and Album of the Year
- Lee Seo-jin – presented Artist of the Year and Record of the Year
