= Supernatural (NewJeans song) =

2024 single by NewJeans

Single by NewJeans
- Language: Japanese; English; Korean
- B-side: "Right Now"
- Released: June 21, 2024
- Genre: New jack swing; dance-pop
- Length: 3:11
- Label: ADOR
- Composers: 250; Pharrell Williams; Ylva Dimberg
- Lyricists: Gigi; Minji; Pharrell Williams; Ylva Dimberg
- Producer: 250

NewJeans singles chronology
"How Sweet" (2024)	"Supernatural" (2024)

Music video
- "Supernatural" (Part.1) on YouTube "Supernatural" (Part.2) on YouTube

"Supernatural" is a song by South Korean girl group NewJeans. ADOR released it as a CD single on June 21, 2024, along with the B-side track "Right Now". Produced by 250, "Supernatural" contains an interpolation of a section from the 2009 track "Back of My Mind" by Manami and songwriter Pharrell Williams. "Supernatural" and "Right Now" became NewJeans's first releases in Japanese, marking their debut in the Japanese music market. NewJeans began promoting in the country in April 2024, by announcing a fan meeting, opening pop-up stores in partnership with Kao and Shibuya109, having "Right Now" be featured in advertisements ahead of the official release, and teasing collaborations with Japanese artists Takashi Murakami and Hiroshi Fujiwara. "Supernatural" was the group's last single before their hiatus as a result of their lawsuit against ADOR, though they would return to the label in November 2025. It is also the last single featuring Danielle, as her exclusive contract with ADOR was terminated a month after the group's return to the label following the lawsuit.

The Korean version of the song was unveiled on July 5, and on the same day, its music video premiered as "(Part.2)" of the original, which was labeled as "(Part.1)". Later on July 12, the group announced that they would also promote the single in Korea, and they subsequently began promotions across all music programs that same week. Jon Caramanica of The New York Times ranked "Supernatural" at number three on his list of the best songs of 2024.

== Background ==
Logo used for the promotion of Supernatural

After debuting in 2022, South Korean girl group NewJeans had their international breakthrough in 2023 with the release of the single album OMG and their second extended play (EP), Get Up. In January 2023, NewJeans entered the Billboard Hot 100 for the first time with the singles "Ditto" and "OMG". In South Korea, "Ditto" became the most successful song of the year, topping the Circle Digital Chart for a record-breaking thirteen weeks, receiving numerous accolades, and introducing the breakbeat trend in the K-pop music industry. Released in July 2023, Get Up internationally established NewJeans as one of the most prominent music acts of the year, becoming the group's first entry and number-one on the Billboard 200, selling over two million copies, and being named among the best albums of 2023 by several publications.

== Music and lyrics ==
Produced by NewJeans's long-time collaborator 250, "Supernatural" interpolated the 2009 track "Back of My Mind" by Japanese singer Manami and American singer Pharrell, who is credited as a lyricist and composer. The B-side track, "Right Now", was described by The Korea Times as "something closer to [...] the Sambass subgenre."

== Release and promotion ==
On March 27, 2024, ADOR announced that NewJeans would release two double singles in 2024: "How Sweet" and "Bubble Gum" on May 24 and "Supernatural" and "Right Now" on June 21. With the release of "Supernatural", NewJeans began their first official cycle of promotional activities in Japan, starting with appearances on television shows and a fan meeting, titled Bunnies Camp 2024 Tokyo Dome, set to be held at the Tokyo Dome on June 26–27, 2024. In conjunction with the singles' announcement, ADOR stated that NewJeans would release an album in the second half of 2024 and embark on a worldwide tour in 2025. The press release caused Hybe Corporation's daily market capitalization to increase by nearly ₩1 trillion. In April 2024, ADOR began promoting NewJeans in Japan by opening pop-up stores in Shibuya, Tokyo, in collaboration with Kao, promoting their hair care brand Essential, (Note: NewJeans started endorsing Essential in April 2024, when "Bubble Gum" was first featured in an advertisement for the brand.) and Shibuya 109, commemorating the store's 45th anniversary.

A teaser for the music video of "Right Now" was released on May 1, 2024; it served to announce a collaboration with Japanese visual artist Takashi Murakami, who worked with NewJeans to create the music video and design artwork for the CD single. Murakami had previously declared himself a "huge fan of NewJeans" and expressed his desire to meet them in January 2023. The video follows the animated characters version of NewJeans, designed in the style of The Powerpuff Girls and first introduced in the music video for their 2023 track "New Jeans". The characters are in search of a love potion when they find a "rainbow flower", resembling Murakami's "iconic" flowers, that gives them supernatural powers. The flower and new designs of the characters were featured in the artwork for the CD single, which was released in three physical formats: a drawstring bag version, (Note: A "bag version" indicates a physical format in which all items, including the CD, are stored in a bag.) a crossbody bag version, and a Weverse-exclusive version. Additional items available with the CD include a photo book, a jewel case, a booklet, photo cards, and post cards.

A snippet of "Right Now" became available on May 9, 2024, after being featured in Lotte Wellfood's advertisement for their dessert brand Zero starring NewJeans. The CD single became available for pre-order on May 10, 2024. The following day, NewJeans released a series of photos on social medias, announcing a collaboration with Japanese designer Hiroshi Fujiwara on a line of apparel and accessories, including T-shirts, hats, bandanas, and bags, which became available in pop-up stores in South Korea and Japan in June 2024. Fujiwara had previously met NewJeans member Hanni while shooting her cover for the February 2024 issue of W Korea.

The group unveiled a Korean version of the song on July 5 and premiered its music video titled as the '(Part.2)' of the Japanese version which was '(Part.1)'. It was later announced on July 12, that the single will also be released in Korean and that the group will begin promotions with all five members as Hyein returns from injury. The group began appearing on all major music programs across South Korean stations that same week starting with MBC's Music Core.

== Track listing ==
"Supernatural" track listing
No.	Title	Lyrics	Music	Arrangement	Length
1.	"Supernatural"	Gigi; Minji; Pharrell Williams; Ylva Dimberg	250; Williams; Dimberg	250	3:11
2.	"Right Now"	Gigi; Lolo Zouaï; Satomoka	Park Jin-su; Zouaï	Park	2:40
3.	"Supernatural" (Instrumental)		250; Williams; Dimberg	250	3:11
4.	"Right Now" (Instrumental)		Park; Zouaï	Park	2:40
Total length:					11:42

== Charts ==
=== Weekly charts ===
Weekly chart performance
Chart (2024)	Peak position
Canada Hot 100 (Billboard)	100
Global 200 (Billboard)	25
Hong Kong (Billboard)	2
Japan (Japan Hot 100)	7
Japan (Oricon)	4
Japan Combined Singles (Oricon)	4
Malaysia (Billboard)	23
Malaysia International (RIM)	19
New Zealand Hot Singles (RMNZ)	13
Singapore (RIAS)	10
South Korea (Circle)	4
South Korean Albums (Circle)	1
Taiwan (Billboard)	7
UK Singles Downloads (Official Charts)	63
UK Singles Sales (OCC)	66
US World Digital Song Sales (Billboard)	2

=== Monthly charts ===
Monthly chart performance
Chart (2024)	Position
Japan (Oricon)	10
South Korea (Circle)	4
South Korean Albums (Circle)	2

=== Year-end charts ===
Year-end chart performance
Chart (2024)	Position
Japan Top Singles Sales (Billboard Japan)	86
Japan (Oricon)	71
South Korea (Circle)	41
South Korean Albums (Circle)	19

Year-end chart performance
Chart (2025)	Position
South Korea (Circle)	79

== Certifications ==
Certifications
Region	Certification	Certified units/sales
Japan (RIAJ) Physical	Gold	100,000^{^}
South Korea (KMCA) Physical (Standard)	Million	1,000,000^{^}
South Korea (KMCA) Physical (Weverse)	Platinum	250,000^{^}
Streaming
Japan (RIAJ)	Gold	50,000,000^{†}
^{^} Shipments figures based on certification alone.^{†} Streaming-only figures based on certification alone.

== Release history ==
Release history and formats for "Supernatural"
Region	Date	Format	Label	Ref.
Various	June 21, 2024	CD; digital download; streaming	ADOR	
