= Odoriko (song) =

2021 single by Vaundy

Single by Vaundy

from the album Replica
- Language: Japanese
- Released: November 17, 2021
- Genre: J-pop
- Length: 3:50
- Label: SDR
- Songwriter: Vaundy
- Producer: Vaundy

Vaundy singles chronology
"NakiJizō" (2021)	"Odoriko" (2021)	"Hadaka no Yūsha" (2021)

Music video
- "Odoriko" on YouTube

"Odoriko" (Japanese: 踊り子; lit. 'dancing girl') is a song recorded by Japanese singer-songwriter Vaundy. The song was released as a digital single, through SDR, on November 17, 2021.

== Background and release ==
"Odoriko" was first performed as the closer for Vaundy's One Man Live Tour Hinode at Zepp Tokyo on October 16, 2021. On November 16, it was announced that the song and its music video would be released digitally the following day. Live footage from the performance was also live-streamed on Vaundy's YouTube channel on the 16th.

== Composition ==
Vaundy composed the song with the intention of evoking a sound similar to Men I Trust. The majority of the song is programmed, with Spectrasonics' Keyscape used for the keyboards and XLN Audio's Addictive Drums for the drums. The bass is played by Vaundy himself.

== Music video ==
The music video for "Odoriko" was released on November 17, 2021. It was directed by Kodai Obayashi and stars Nana Komatsu.

== Covers ==
NewJeans's member Minji covered the song at the group's Bunnies Camp 2024 Tokyo Dome fan meeting held at the Tokyo Dome on June 26 and 27, 2024.

The Boyz's member Q released the video of the song cover on November 4, 2024.

Ateez's member Seonghwa covered the song and released a MV for it on January 9, 2025.

ENHYPEN's member Sunghoon also covered and released a MV on September 27, 2025.

== Charts ==
=== Weekly charts ===
Chart (2021–2025)	Peak position
Japan (Japan Hot 100)	15
Japan Combined Singles (Oricon)	19
South Korea (Circle)	79

=== Monthly charts ===
Chart (2024)	Peak osition
South Korea (Circle)	81

=== Year-end charts ===
Chart (2022)	Position
Japan (Japan Hot 100)	28

Chart (2023)	Position
Japan (Japan Hot 100)	53

Chart (2024)	Position
Japan (Japan Hot 100)	86

Chart (2025)	Position
Japan (Japan Hot 100)	75

== Certifications ==
Region	Certification	Certified units/sales
Streaming
Japan (RIAJ)	3× Platinum	300,000,000^{†}
^{†} Streaming-only figures based on certification alone.
