= Super Shy =

2023 single by NewJeans

Single by NewJeans

from the EP Get Up
- Language: English; Korean
- Written: 2020
- Released: July 7, 2023
- Genre: Liquid drum and bass; Jersey club; bubblegum
- Length: 2:34
- Label: ADOR
- Composers: Erika de Casier; Frankie Scoca; Kristine Bogan
- Lyricists: Gigi; Danielle; Kim Dong-hyun; Erika de Casier; Kristine Bogan
- Producer: Frankie Scoca

NewJeans singles chronology
"OMG" (2023)	"Super Shy" (2023)	"Cool with You" (2023)

Music video
- "Super Shy" on YouTube

"Super Shy" is a song by the South Korean girl group NewJeans, featured as the first of three singles from their second extended play, Get Up (2023). ADOR, a division of Hybe Corporation, released the song for download and streaming on July 7, 2023, alongside the prologue song "New Jeans." Later, "Super Shy" was sent to contemporary hit radio in the United States through Interscope Records on August 15, 2023. It is a mix of liquid drum and bass, bubblegum, and Jersey club, featuring a staccato kick drum pattern. Written by Gigi, Kim Dong-hyun, Erika de Casier, Kristine Bogan, Frankie Scoca, and NewJeans member Danielle, it is about a shy person who expresses their feelings to a crush.

Music critics praised "Super Shy" for its innovative and captivating production. Many publications including NME, The Guardian, Pitchfork, and Rolling Stone ranked the song in their 2023 year-end lists. The single was NewJeans' third number-one hit on the South Korean Circle Digital Chart. It also reached number one on the Singaporean chart and on Billboard's Hits of the World charts for Hong Kong, Malaysia, and Taiwan. Elsewhere, it became the group's best-charting song on the Billboard Global 200 peaking at number two and on charts of several countries including the United Kingdom and the US Billboard Hot 100.

Directed by Shin Hee-won, the music video features NewJeans flash mobbing in Lisbon, Portugal. Critics noted its vibrant visuals, blending Y2K nostalgia with modern trends. The choreography, by Black.Q and Eunju Kim, showcases the members performing waacking and easy to follow moves, with NewJeans dressed in youthful outfits. To promote the single, the group appeared on various South Korean music programs, resulting in six first-place music program awards, including a triple crown on Inkigayo.

== Background and composition ==
Logo used for the promotion of Super Shy

Following the release of OMG — their first single album — in January 2023, ADOR CEO and creative director Min Hee-jin revealed NewJeans was preparing a new album in an interview with Cine21 later that month. In April, Min stated in an interview with Billboard that the group had finished recording earlier that month. South Korean media outlets reported that the album would be released in July 2023, preceded by a prerelease track set to be released on July 7. ADOR announced in June that NewJeans would release their second extended play, Get Up, on July 21, 2023, which would feature six songs. These include the triple title tracks "Super Shy", "ETA", and "Cool With You", along with the prologue song "New Jeans". In an interview with Rolling Stone, member Hanni described the upcoming tracks as "fresh", saying that the EP "definitely has a lot more variety to offer, in not just genre of music and dance style, but what we are striving to express and show to you".

"Super Shy" was composed by Erika de Casier, Kristine Bogan, and Frankie Scoca, who also served as producer. It is a liquid drum and bass and bubblegum Jersey club song that features a staccato kick drum pattern. The Guardian's Ben Beaumont-Thomas said that the production "sits somewhere between liquid drum'n'bass, UK garage and Jersey club", and Pitchfork's Olivia Horn wrote that the drums evoked "a hiccuping heartbeat". The lyrics of the song were written by de Casier and Bogan along with Gigi, Kim Dong-hyun, and NewJeans member Danielle. The song's lyrics depict a shy person expressing their feelings to a crush.

== Release and performances ==
Two days before the release, ADOR posted a video teaser on YouTube Shorts featuring the instrumental version of the song in the background and showing NewJeans' official light stick, the hashtag "ImSuperShy", and the release date. In an accompanying press release, they presented "Super Shy" as the perfect song for the summer. It was released by ADOR for digital download and streaming on July 7, 2023. NewJeans promoted the song in partnership with YouTube Shorts through a dance challenge released under the hashtag "ImSuperShy". For the campaign's design, YouTube won silver at the 2024 Clio Music Awards. "Super Shy" was sent to US pop radio format by NewJeans' local distributor Interscope on August 15, 2023. NewJeans performs "Super Shy" with 20 backup dancers. They first showcased this performance, along with the song "New Jeans," on the South Korean Music Bank show on July 14, 2023. They also performed both songs on Inkigayo on July 16, 2023. NewJeans appeared on Music Bank to perform all three singles from Get Up on July 23, 2023, the day of the EP's release.

== Reception ==
Professional ratings
Review scores
Source	Rating
IZM	3/5 stars
The Singles Jukebox	7.6/10

"Super Shy" was met with critical acclaim from music critics. Kim Ho-hyeon of IZM highlighted the song's minimal sound with dynamic elements showcasing technical skill. Noting how the vocals blend with the overall sound, supporting enigmatic lyrics, he mentioned that the track's lack of a strong melody may not immediately captivate listeners. "Super Shy" was named the best K-pop song of 2023 by Billboard and NME, and appeared within the top 10 on multiple other critic lists. Times of India opined "the song [...] encapsulates the innovative spirit of K-pop in 2023, leaving an indomitable imprint on the musical landscape.

"Super Shy" on select year-end critic lists
Publication	List	Rank	Ref.
Beats Per Minute	Top 50 Songs of 2023	27	
Billboard	The 100 Best Songs of 2023	38	
Billboard	The 25 Best K-pop Songs of 2023	1	
British GQ	The Best Songs of 2023	N/A	
Crack	The Top 25 Tracks of the Year	17	
Consequence	The 200 Best Songs of 2023	60	
Dazed	Top 50 Best K-pop Tracks of 2023	47	
Exclaim!	25 Best Songs of 2023	21	
The Fader	The 100 Best Songs of 2023	1	
Grammy	15 K-Pop Songs That Took 2023 By Storm	N/A	
The Guardian	The 20 Best Songs of 2023	3	
i-D	The 100 Best Songs of 2023	2	
NME	The 25 Best K-pop Songs of 2023	1	
NME	The 50 Best Songs of 2023	2	
NPR	Best Songs of 2023	N/A	
Pitchfork	The 100 Best Songs of 2023	7	
Pitchfork	The 100 Best Songs of the 2020s So Far	13	
The Quietus	Top 75 Tracks of 2023	36	
Rolling Stone	The 100 Best Songs of 2023	6	
Stereogum	50 Favorite Songs of 2023	3	
Vulture	The 10 Best Songs of 2023	10	

=== Commercial performance ===
"Super Shy" debuted at number 27 on South Korea's Circle Digital Chart in the issue dated July 2–8, 2023. It rose to number one the following week. The song debuted at number one on Singapore's Top Streaming Chart, the Malaysia International chart, and the Billboard Hits of the World charts for Hong Kong and Taiwan, earning NewJeans their first number-one in Hong Kong. It also became NewJeans best-performing song in the United Kingdom, debuting at number 59 on the UK Singles Chart in the issue dated July 14–20, 2023. In the United States, it debuted at number 66 on the Billboard Hot 100 in the chart issue dated July 22, 2023, with 9.2 million official US streams and 2,000 downloads sold, becoming their highest-charting song in the country. A week later, the song peaked at number 64. The song debuted at number two on both the Billboard Global 200 and the Billboard Global Excl. US in the chart issue dated July 22, 2023, with 63 million streams and 6,000 downloads sold worldwide. It attained NewJeans' largest amount of one-week streams for a song, surpassing "Ditto"'s peak of 46.5 million one-week streams, and became NewJeans' best performing song on Billboard Global 200.

== Music video ==
A scene in the music video shows the members performing the song's choreography with flash mobs in the streets of Lisbon, Portugal.

Produced by Min Hee-jin, the music video for "Super Shy" was released on Hybe's YouTube channel in conjunction with the song. It was directed by Shin Hee-won, who had previously directed music videos for NewJeans' songs "Attention" and "Hurt". The musical-style video starts with Danielle riding a red bicycle through the streets of Lisbon, Portugal, to go meet the other members in a park. Later on, they notice that an exercise group is dancing to "Attention" and soon join them to perform "Super Shy", prompting flash mobs in squares, parks, streets, and markets among others. Created by Black.Q and Eunju Kim, the choreography is based on waacking and purposefully includes simple movements. In the video, NewJeans are dressed in a youthful style, donning hairstyles like bleached blonde hair and bangs, and wear cheerleading uniforms and tennis skirts. David Renshaw of The Fader noted the influence of filmmaker Wes Anderson's visual style throughout the video.

=== Reception ===
Jaeden Pinder of Pitchfork named it the best music video choreography of the year, stating that it distinguishes itself amid the high-energy K-pop scene with its bashfulness and impressive synchronization. Vogue Singapore's Azrin Tan highlighted the video's imagery, which features NewJeans's signature aesthetic, blending Y2K nostalgia with modern trends. Tan noted Danielle's cottagecore look, Hanni's blonde hair, Hyein's "trendy" skunk stripes, Haerin's "innocent" floral accent, and Minji's tone-on-tone style; the writer opined that each member's style contributed to the video's visual appeal, along with their dynamic choreography and energy. Similarly, W Magazine's Noh Gyeong-eon highlighted how NewJeans wore costumes featuring illustrations by Migo, emphasizing their girlish charm and creating a cohesive cheerleader aesthetic with a sporty and individualistic twist.

== Accolades ==
"Super Shy" won six first place music program awards, including a triple crown (or three wins) on Inkigayo.

Awards and nominations for "Super Shy"
Award ceremony	Year	Category	Result	Ref.
Asian Pop Music Awards	2023	Song of the Year (Overseas)	Nominated	
Asian Pop Music Awards	2023	Top 20 Songs of the Year (Overseas)	Won	
iHeartRadio Music Awards	2024	K-pop Song of the Year	Nominated	

Music program awards
Program	Date	Ref.
M Countdown	July 13, 2023	
Show! Music Core	July 22, 2023	
Inkigayo	July 23, 2023	
Inkigayo	August 20, 2023	
Inkigayo	August 27, 2023	
Show Champion	August 16, 2023	

== Track listing ==
- Digital download and streaming
1. "New Jeans" – 1:48
2. "Super Shy" – 2:34

== Credits and personnel ==
Credits adapted from the EP's lyric book.

Locations

- Recorded, engineered and edited at Hybe Studio
- Mixed at Brecks Farmhouse Studios
- Mastered at Becker Mastering, Pasadena, California

Credits and personnel

- Frankie Scoca – composition, instrumental, programming
- Erika de Casier – composition, lyrics
- Kristine Bogan – composition, lyrics
- Gigi – lyrics
- Donghyun Kim – lyrics
- Danielle – lyrics
- Heejin Min – vocal directing
- Jungwoo Jang – vocal directing
- NewJeans – background vocals
- Emily Kim – background vocals
- Pyungwook Lee – engineering
- Bakyeong Wang – engineering
- Yeji Cha – vocal editing
- Nathan Boddy – mixing
- Dale Becker – mastering

== Charts ==
=== Weekly charts ===
Weekly chart performance
Chart (2023–2024)	Peak position
Australia (ARIA)	14
Canada Hot 100 (Billboard)	26
Global 200 (Billboard)	2
Hong Kong (Billboard)	1
Indonesia (Billboard)	3
Ireland (IRMA)	77
Japan Hot 100 (Billboard)	10
Japan Combined Singles (Oricon)	5
Lithuania (AGATA)	98
Malaysia (Billboard)	1
Malaysia International (RIM)	1
Netherlands (Global Top 40)	16
Netherlands (Single Tip)	24
New Zealand (Recorded Music NZ)	16
Philippines (Billboard)	5
Portugal (AFP)	127
Singapore (RIAS)	1
South Korea (Circle)	1
Taiwan (Billboard)	1
UK Singles (Official Charts)	52
UK Indie (Official Charts)	14
US Billboard Hot 100	48
US Pop Airplay (Billboard)	37
US World Digital Song Sales (Billboard)	2
Vietnam (Vietnam Hot 100)	2

=== Monthly charts ===
Monthly chart performance
Chart (2023)	Position
South Korea (Circle)	1

=== Year-end charts ===
2023 year-end chart performance for "Super Shy"
Chart (2023)	Position
Global 200 (Billboard)	117
Japan Streaming Songs (Billboard Japan)	100
South Korea (Circle)	12

2024 year-end chart performance for "Super Shy"
Chart (2024)	Position
South Korea (Circle)	37

2025 year-end chart performance for "Super Shy"
Chart (2025)	Position
South Korea (Circle)	168

== Certifications ==
Certifications
Region	Certification	Certified units/sales
New Zealand (RMNZ)	Platinum	30,000^{‡}
United Kingdom (BPI)	Silver	200,000^{‡}
Streaming
Japan (RIAJ)	Platinum	100,000,000^{†}
South Korea (KMCA)	Platinum	100,000,000^{†}
^{‡} Sales+streaming figures based on certification alone.^{†} Streaming-only figures based on certification alone.

== Release history ==
Release history
Region	Date	Format	Label	Ref.
Various	July 7, 2023	Digital download; streaming	ADOR	
United States	August 15, 2023	Contemporary hit radio	Interscope	

== See also ==
- List of Inkigayo Chart winners (2023)
- List of M Countdown Chart winners (2023)
- List of Show! Music Core Chart winners (2023)
- List of Show Champion Chart winners (2023)
- List of Circle Digital Chart number ones of 2023
- List of number-one songs of 2023 in Singapore
- List of number-one songs of 2023 (Malaysia)
