= Zero (NewJeans song) =

Promotional single by NewJeans
- Language: English; Korean
- Released: April 3, 2023
- Length: 2:34
- Label: ADOR
- Composers: Monro; Ylva Dimberg
- Lyricists: Gigi; Ylva Dimberg
- Producer: Monro

Music video
- "Zero" on YouTube

Music video
- "Zero (J.I.D Remix)" on YouTube

"Zero" is a song by South Korean girl group NewJeans, released as a promotional single for Coca-Cola's Korean campaign for Coca-Cola Zero Sugar on April 3, 2023. It is the group's first track primarily in English, and was accompanied by a music video.

== Background ==
NewJeans were previously announced as global ambassadors for Coca-Cola, with "Zero" serving as their project in the role.

A remix to the song, featuring American rapper JID, was released on June 20, 2023, along with a music video released the following day.

== Composition ==
"Zero" contains "various genres and sounds, such as pop and R&B chords and Jersey club rhythms", with a press release stating it also combines "the urgency of drums and bass and the sweetness of R&B". It contains lyrics referencing Coca-Cola in a "fusion" of Korean and English lyrics.

== Music video ==
The music video, released on YouTube on April 3, 2023, shows the group getting ready, performing "energetic choreography" and drinking Coca-Cola. The music video for the remix, featuring JID, was released on June 21, 2023.

== Accolades ==
Awards and nominations for Zero
| Award ceremony | Year | Category | Result | Ref. |
|---|---|---|---|---|
| Spikes Asia Awards | 2024 | Brand or Product Integration into Music Content | Shortlisted | |

== Charts ==
=== Weekly charts ===
Weekly chart performance for "Zero"
| Chart (2023) | Peak position |
|---|---|
| Global Excl. US (Billboard) | 154 |
| Japan (Japan Hot 100) | 58 |
| New Zealand Hot Singles (RMNZ) | 29 |
| Singapore (RIAS) | 22 |
| South Korea (Circle) | 12 |

=== Monthly charts ===
Monthly chart performance for "Zero"
| Chart (2023) | Position |
|---|---|
| South Korea (Circle) | 24 |

== Release history ==
Release history for "Zero"
| Region | Date | Format | Version | Label | Ref. |
|---|---|---|---|---|---|
| Various | April 3, 2023 | Digital download; streaming | Original | ADOR; YG Plus | |
| Various | June 20, 2023 | Digital download; streaming | JID remix | ADOR; YG Plus | |
