= Danielle (singer) =

Australian and South Korean singer (born 2005)

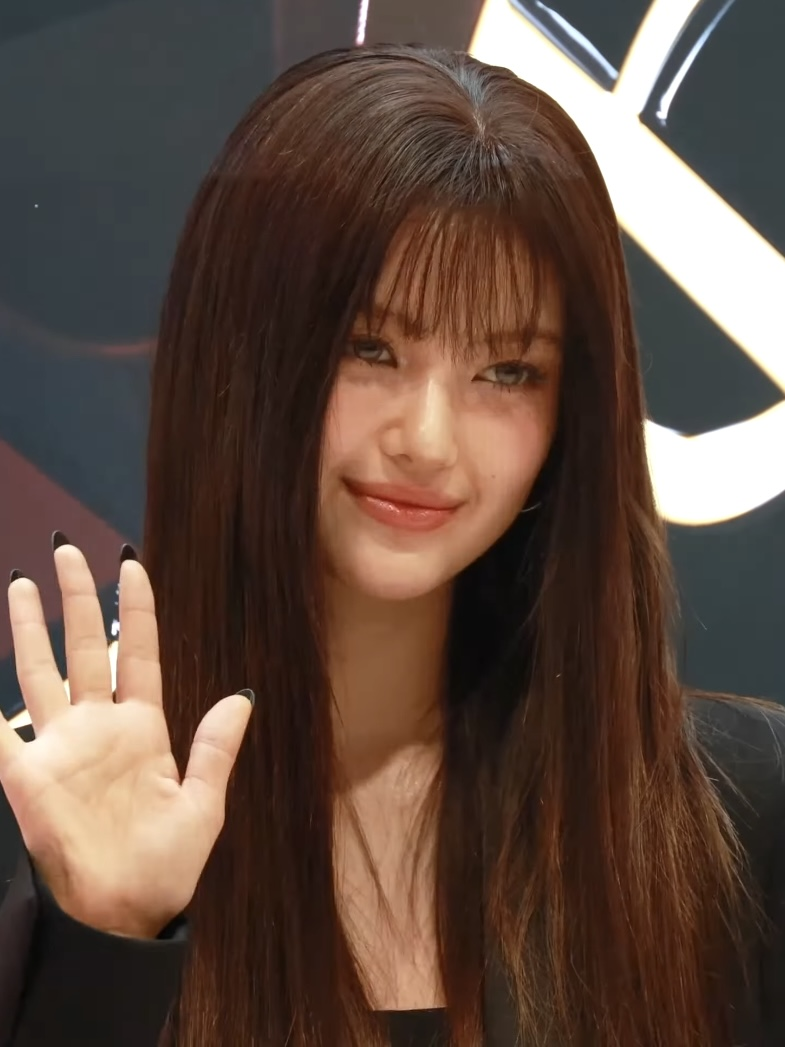
- Danielle in 2024
- Born: Danielle June Marsh; 11 April 2005 (age 21); Newcastle, New South Wales, Australia
- Other name: Mo Ji-hye
- Occupation: Singer
- Years active: 2022–present
- Musical career
- Genre: K-pop
- Instrument: Vocals
- Label: ADOR
- Formerly of: NewJeans

Korean name
- Hangul: 모지혜
- RR: Mo Jihye
- MR: Mo Chihye

Danielle June Marsh (born 11 April 2005) is an Australian and South Korean singer. She is best known as a former member of the South Korean girl group NewJeans.

Danielle began her career in the entertainment industry by making several appearances on television as a child, before debuting as a member of NewJeans in 2022. The group was formed by ADOR, a subsidiary of Hybe. The following year, Danielle ventured into acting, voicing Ariel in the Korean language dub of The Little Mermaid (2023). Following a contract dispute, Danielle was removed from NewJeans at the end of 2025.

== Early life ==
Danielle June Marsh, Korean name Mo Ji-hye (Korean: 모지혜), was born on 11 April 2005, in Newcastle, New South Wales, Australia, to an Australian father and a South Korean mother. (Note: Attributed to multiple references:) She has an older sister, Olivia Marsh, a singer who made her debut in 2024. In 2009, at the age of four, Danielle and her family moved to Paju, South Korea.

== Career ==
=== 2011–2021: Pre-debut activities ===
In 2011, Danielle made her first television appearance on tvN's Rainbow Kindergarten and SBS's My Heart's Crayon. She went on to appear on Shinhwa Broadcasting and Jesse's Play Kitchen in 2012. In 2012, at the age of seven, Danielle returned to Australia to attend primary school.

Danielle returned to South Korea and became a K-pop trainee in 2020.

=== 2022–2023: Debut with NewJeans and acting ===
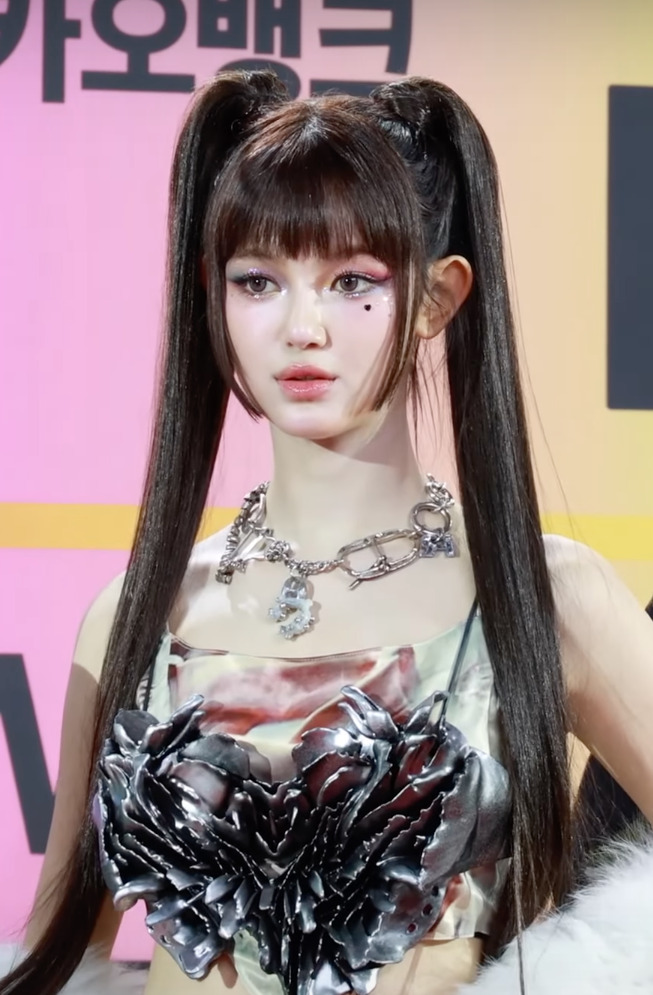
Danielle at the Melon Music Awards in 2023

On 22 July 2022, Danielle made her debut alongside NewJeans with the release of their debut single, "Attention", which she co-wrote. She has since participated in the songwriting of five NewJeans songs. "Attention" topped South Korea's Circle Digital Chart and won Best K-pop Song at the 20th Korean Music Awards.

In 2023, Danielle voiced Ariel in the Korean dub of The Little Mermaid (2023). Danielle's acting and singing in the film were praised after the first screening. She recorded several songs for the soundtrack of the film, including the single "Part of Your World", which was released on 17 May 2023, and debuted at number two on Billboard's Hot Trending Songs.

=== 2024–present: Contract dispute and termination by ADOR ===
In May 2024, Danielle hosted the Korea on Stage – New Generation concert, organised by the Cultural Heritage Administration. On 28 November 2024, Danielle and the other members of NewJeans announced that they had terminated their contracts with ADOR, following a dispute between the agency's former CEO, Min Hee-jin, and its parent company, Hybe. ADOR maintained that the contracts remained "in full effect".

In October 2025, the Seoul Central District Court ruled that the members' exclusive contracts with ADOR remained valid until 2029. On 29 December, ADOR announced that it had terminated Danielle's exclusive contract, stating that she could no longer continue as a member of NewJeans. The agency also said it intended to hold one of her family members and former ADOR CEO Min Hee-jin responsible for the dispute. On 30 December, ADOR filed a lawsuit against Danielle, the family member and Min, seeking ₩43.1 billion (US$32.16 million) (Note: Around US$30 million at the time of filing) in contractual penalties and damages. Danielle later appointed legal representation.

Hearings began in May 2026. Danielle's representatives disputed ADOR's allegations and questioned the extent of her individual responsibility for the group's suspended activities. In June, ADOR reduced its damages claim to approximately ₩33.1 billion (US$24.7 million). Later hearings examined ADOR's calculation of financial losses, the disclosure of advertising contracts and whether Danielle could be held individually responsible for revenue lost during the group's suspended activities. At the seventh hearing, held on 12 November 2026 at the Seoul Central District Court, the parties continued to contest the financial evidence and the assessment of damages. The court scheduled the next hearing for 10 December 2026.

In June 2026, Danielle filed a complaint with South Korea's Fair Trade Commission (KFTC) against Hybe and ADOR, alleging that she had been treated differently from the other NewJeans members during the contractual dispute. Her representatives also questioned penalty clauses in standard K-pop artist contracts, which calculate compensation using projected revenue and the remaining contract term rather than the agency's actual losses. The KFTC began reviewing the complaint that month.

== Other ventures ==
In January 2023, Burberry announced that Danielle had become one of their global ambassadors. Later, in March, she became a global brand ambassador for Yves Saint Laurent Beauty and appeared in a promotional campaign for their Candy Glaze lipstick. In March 2024, Danielle became a global brand ambassador for Celine. In May 2024, she appeared in her first promotional campaign for Celine, developed by Hedi Slimane, the brand's creative director. In December 2024, Danielle became an Omega ambassador.

== Discography ==
=== Singles ===
Title	Year	Peak chart position	Album
Title	Year	KOR Down.	Album
"Part of Your World" (저곳으로)	2023	47	The Little Mermaid

=== Songwriting credits ===
All credits are adapted from the Korea Music Copyright Association, unless cited otherwise.

List of songs, showing year of release, artist's name and album name
Year	Artist	Title	Album	Lyricist		Composer	
Year	Artist	Title	Album	Credited	With	Credited	With
2022	NewJeans	"Attention"	New Jeans	Yes	Gigi, Duckbay & 250	No	N/A
2023	NewJeans	"Super Shy"	Get Up	Yes	Kim Dong-hyun, Gigi, Kristine Bogan, Erika de Casier & Frankie Scoca	No	N/A
2023	NewJeans	"Cool with You"	Get Up	Yes	Kim Dong-hyun, Gigi, Erika de Casier, Fine Glindvad Jensen, Park Jin-su & Frankie Scoca	No	N/A
2023	NewJeans	"ASAP"	Get Up	Yes	Gigi, Erika de Casier, Fine Glindvad Jensen, Catharina Stoltenberg Henriette Motzfeldt & 250	No	N/A
2024	NewJeans	"How Sweet"	Non-album singles	Yes	Sarah Aarons, Gigi, Elvira Anderfjärd, Oscar Scheller, Stella Bennett, Tove Burman & 250	No	N/A
2024	Herself	"Butterflies (With You)"	Non-album singles	Yes	—N/a	Yes	—N/a

== Filmography ==
=== Film ===
Year	Title	Role	Notes	Ref.
2023	The Little Mermaid	Ariel	Korean dub	

=== Television ===
Year	Title	Role	Ref.
2011	Rainbow Kindergarten	Herself	
2012	Shinhwa Broadcasting	Herself	
2012	Jesse's Play Kitchen	Herself	
