= Cool with You =

2023 single by NewJeans

Song by NewJeans

from the EP Get Up
- Released: July 21, 2023
- Genre: UK garage; bedroom pop
- Length: 2:27
- Label: ADOR
- Composers: Park Jin-soo; Frankie Scoca; Erika de Casier; Fine Glindvad Jensen
- Lyricists: Gigi; Kim Dong-hyun; Erika de Casier; Fine Glindvad Jensen; Danielle

NewJeans chronology
"Super Shy" (2023)	"Cool with You" (2023)	"ETA" (2023)

Music video
- "Cool with You" (side A) on YouTube "Cool with You" & "Get Up" (side B) on YouTube

"Cool with You" is a song by the South Korean girl group NewJeans from their second extended play (EP), Get Up. The song was released on July 21, 2023, by ADOR. "Cool with You" was written by Gigi, Kim Dong-hyun, Erika de Casier, Fine Glindvad Jensen and group member Danielle whilst composition was handled by Park Jin-soo, Frankie Scoca, Erika de Casier and Fine Glindvad Jensen. Two music videos were produced for the song—a side A video and side B video—and features appearances from HoYeon Jung and Tony Leung.

== Background and release ==
The dual side A and side B music videos for "Cool with You" were uploaded to Hybe's official YouTube channel two days prior to being made available on streaming platforms. It follows the release of the music video for Get Up's first single "Super Shy," two weeks prior.

== Composition and reception ==
"Cool with You" is a track "firmly rooted in UK garage", according to NME, with Teen Vogue adding that it "is a standout vocally and visually". The latter publication highlighted the group's "individual runs and beautifully layered harmonies" throughout the track, drawing comparisons to "Hurt" from their debut EP. Paste described the genre as bedroom pop.

"Cool with You" appeared at number nine on Time Out's list of the best songs of 2023.

== Music video ==
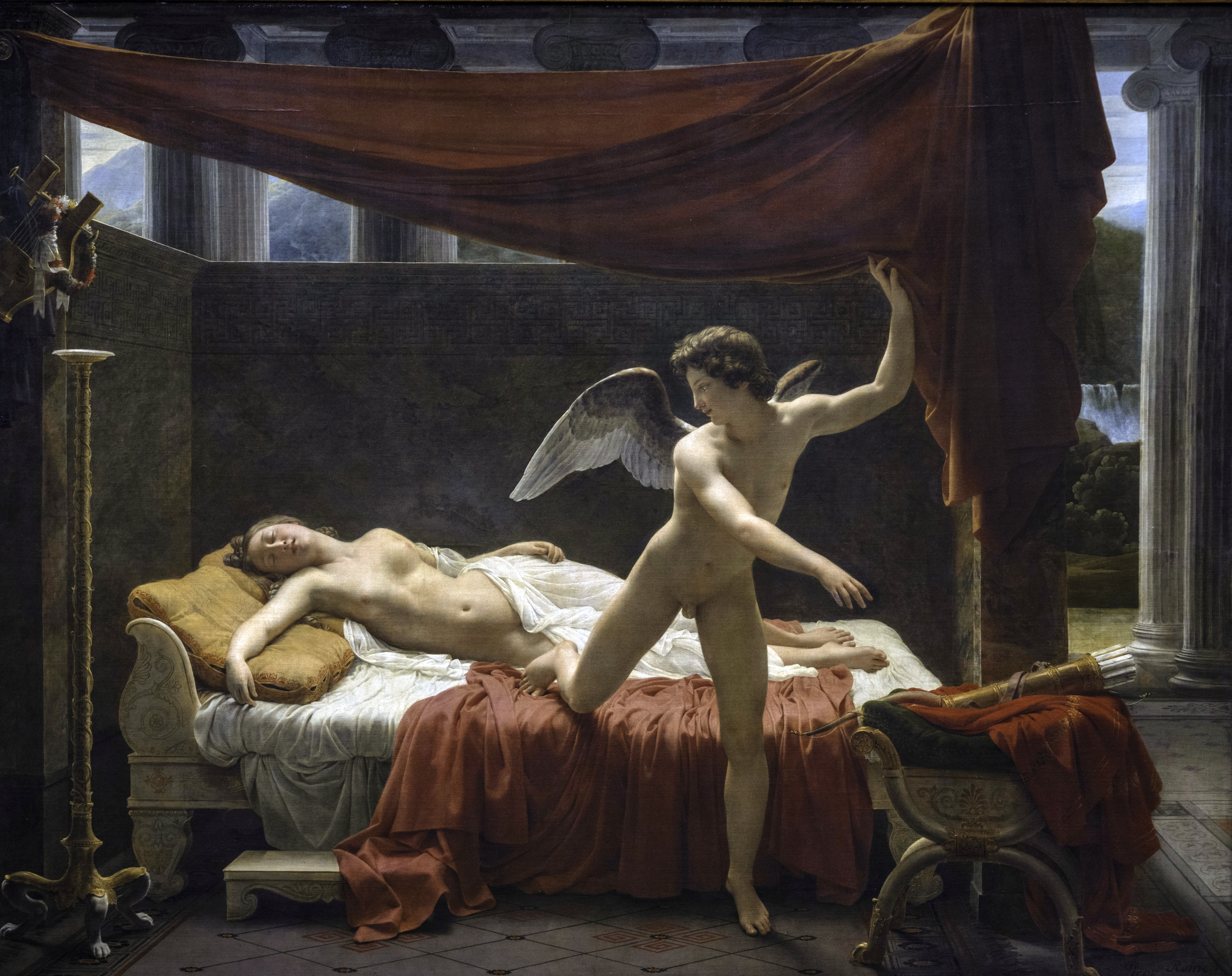
The music video revolves around the tale of Cupid and Psyche, which is depicted in the painting L'Amour et Psyché (1817) by François-Édouard Picot.

Both the side A and side B videos were directed by Shin Wooseok and shot in Barcelona, Spain. HoYeon Jung, who portrays Cupid (or Eros), stars in the side videos and goes about life while appearing invisible to the people in her surroundings. Upon entering an art museum, member Danielle is shown presenting an oil painting titled L'Amour et Psyché (1817) by François-Édouard Picot to a group of spectators, in which she explains the tale of the forbidden love between Cupid and Psyche. Shortly after viewing the painting, Cupid sees a man who represents Psyche (portrayed by Micol Vela) and quickly becomes the object of her affections, while the members of NewJeans don angels watching the forbidden love story play out.

In side B, Cupid is finally visible to the man she first saw at the art museum, and thus their love story begins to unravel. Tony Leung Chiu-wai portrays the antagonist Aphrodite in the video; upon appearing onscreen, he is shown to have made Psyche fall in love with another woman whilst Cupid returns to being completely invisible. In an interview with GQ Korea by actor Lee Jung-jae, Leung stated that he was unpaid for his appearance, describing it as "a small gift for [his] Korean fans". The video ends with Cupid watching NewJeans dancing to the EP's interlude track "Get Up".

== Credits and personnel ==
Credits adapted from Melon.

- NewJeans – vocals
  - Danielle – lyrics
- Erika de Casier – lyrics, composition
- Fine Glindvad Jensen – lyrics, composition
- Park Jin-soo – composition, arrangement
- Frankie Scoca – composition, arrangement
- Gigi – lyrics
- Kim Dong-hyun – lyrics

== Charts ==
=== Weekly charts ===
Weekly chart performance
Chart (2023)	Peak position
Australia (ARIA)	40
Canada Hot 100 (Billboard)	57
Global 200 (Billboard)	22
Hong Kong (Billboard)	4
Japan (Japan Hot 100)	43
Japan Combined Singles (Oricon)	38
Malaysia (Billboard)	8
Malaysia International (RIM)	7
New Zealand Hot Singles (RMNZ)	8
Singapore (RIAS)	4
South Korea (Circle)	14
Taiwan (Billboard)	6
UK Independent (Official Charts)	48
US Billboard Hot 100	93
US World Digital Song Sales (Billboard)	7
Vietnam (Vietnam Hot 100)	7

=== Monthly charts ===
Monthly chart performance
Chart (2023)	Position
South Korea (Circle)	16

=== Year-end charts ===
Year-end chart performance
Chart (2023)	Position
South Korea (Circle)	135

== Release history ==
Release history
Region	Date	Format	Label	Ref.
Various	July 21, 2023	Digital download; streaming	ADOR	
