= Get Up (EP) =

2023 EP by NewJeans

- Digital cover

EP by NewJeans
- Released: July 21, 2023
- Studio: Hybe Studio
- Genres: Dance; R&B
- Length: 12:10
- Languages: Korean; English
- Label: ADOR
- Producers: Park Jin-su; 250; Frankie Scoca; Catharina Stoltenberg; Henriette Motzfeldt

NewJeans chronology
OMG (2023)	Get Up (2023)	NJWMX (2023)

Singles from Get Up
- 1. "Super Shy" Released: July 7, 2023; 2. "Cool with You" Released: July 21, 2023; 3. "ETA" Released: July 21, 2023

Get Up is the second extended play (EP) by the South Korean girl group NewJeans, released on July 21, 2023, by ADOR. Produced by Park Jin-su, 250, Frankie Scoca, Catharina Stoltenberg, and Henriette Motzfeldt, Get Up draws from R&B and dance styles such as UK garage, drum and bass, Baltimore, and Jersey club. Its sound is characterized by lively beats and synthesizers. Lyrically, the EP mainly revolves around feelings ensued from friendship and love.

Get Up was supported by three singles: "Super Shy", "ETA", and "Cool with You". All six tracks were accompanied by music videos that were collaborations with brands such as Apple and the Powerpuff Girls, and featured celebrities such as Hoyeon Jung and Tony Leung. NewJeans promoted the EP through a worldwide marketing campaign with Spotify and live performances on South Korean music programs and the Lollapalooza festival in the US.

Music critics generally praised the production of Get Up as experimental, refreshing, and engaging. It appeared on year-end lists of the best music of 2023 by publications such as British GQ, Paste, and Rolling Stone. In South Korea, the EP debuted at number two on the Circle Album Chart and sold 1.65 million copies within its first week of release. It peaked atop the US Billboard 200 and reached the top five in Canada, France, Japan, New Zealand and Scotland.

== Background ==
NewJeans surprise-released their debut single, "Attention", in July 2022. It was followed by their debut EP, New Jeans, which was supported by two other singles, "Hype Boy" and "Cookie". The EP became the first debut album by a K-pop girl group to sell over a million copies. The group later became the fastest K-pop act to reach one billion streams on Spotify, following the release of their commercially successful first single album, OMG, in January 2023. The album included the tracks "Ditto" and "OMG", the former of which became the longest-running number-one song on South Korea's Circle Digital Chart and marked the group's first entry on the Billboard Hot 100.

In January 2023, ADOR CEO Min Hee-jin revealed in an interview with South Korean magazine Cine21 that NewJeans was preparing an album. On April 4, 2023, South Korean news site Star News reported that the album would be released in July 2023, preceded by one of its B-side tracks set to be released at the end of June. Later that month, Min stated in an interview with Billboard that the group had finished recording in early April. In May 2023, Korean media outlets reported that the B-side track would be released on July 7. On June 19, 2023, ADOR officially announced the release date for NewJeans' second EP, titled Get Up, and revealed its tracklist which included the lead singles, alongside a snippet of one of the B-side tracks. On the same day, the EP was made available for pre-order. After the announcement, Hybe's share price rose by 3% in one day.

== Writing ==
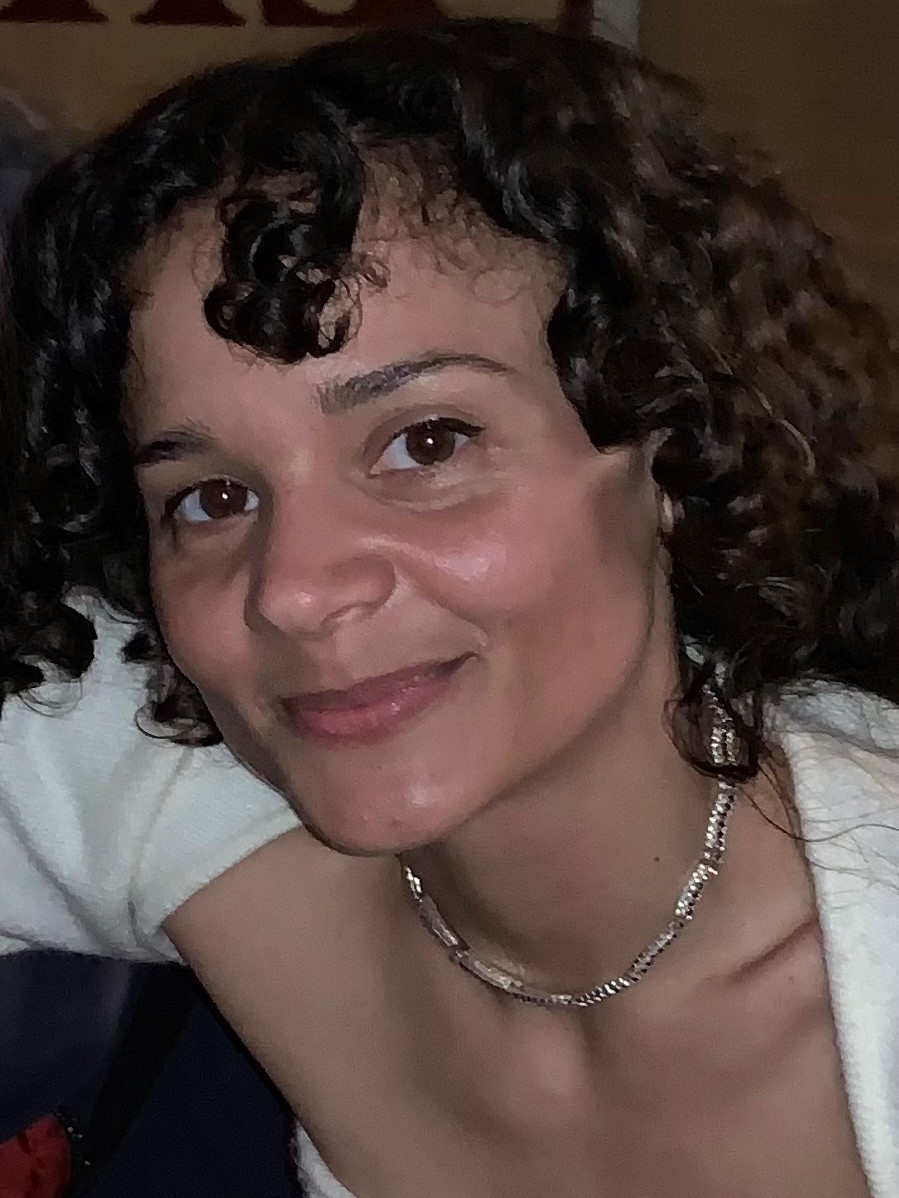
Erika de Casier (pictured) co-wrote four tracks on Get Up.

To produce Get Up, ADOR enlisted both long-time collaborators, such as South Korean producers 250 and Park Jin-su, and musicians outside of the K-pop music scene. The label organized a studio session in Copenhagen where they invited the Danish singer-songwriter Erika de Casier, Catharina Stoltenberg and Henriette Motzfeldt of Norwegian musical duo Smerz, Danish producer Fine Glindvad Jensen, American songwriter Kristine Bogan, and American producer Frankie Scoca, among others. De Casier, Stoltenberg, Motzfeldt, and Jensen already knew each other and were friends; both de Casier and Stoltenberg said they had never listened to K-pop before the project. Analyzing the musicians' discographies, critic Kim Do-heon noted that they all shared a R&B-based languid bedroom pop production mixed with UK garage. The musicians were initially divided in groups and asked to produce something by lunch; the only guide they had were loops sent by 250 to use as starting points.

De Casier, Stoltenberg, and Motzfeldt described the writing sessions as "spontaneous" and "playful" in interviews with GQ and Crack. It was their first time writing music for others, a process that they found liberating compared to working on their own music, which allowed them to naturally develop the songs. Used to working as a duo, Stoltenberg and Motzfeldt said that writing with others was initially confusing as they had to direct the production while Jensen and de Casier simultaneously wrote the tracks. Since they were writing for a group of teenagers, they decided to go for lively melodies and youthful lyrics. Stoltenberg said some of the elements and rhythms – "this half tempo, fast tempo switch and vocal samples" along with a "sparse" production – were inspired by footwork and similar genres they used to listen to at the start of their career. The session lasted a few days, during which the group wrote four of the EP's six tracks: "New Jeans", "Super Shy", "Cool with You", and "ASAP".

The first song they wrote was "Super Shy". De Casier said that she was inspired by her experiences as a shy teenager when writing the lyrics with Bogan. For "New Jeans", de Casier first came up with the hook "new year, new jeans, you and me" and her and Jensen built the song around the call and response chant, inspired by S.O.A.P. and Aqua. "Cool with You" was initially developed by de Casier and Jensen while they were sharing ideas and voice memos. "ASAP" was developed from a beat created by Smerz and based on one of 250's loops at the end of the session, during late afternoon, while the group was relaxing. The songs were then sent to the label and finished in South Korea, where some of the lyrics were changed and translated to Korean; NewJeans member Haerin was credited for the first time as a lyricist on "New Jeans" and member Danielle wrote lyrics for "Super Shy" and "ASAP". Park was also credited as a composer and producer on "New Jeans" and "Cool with You". The remaining tracks, "ETA" and "Get Up", were produced by 250; "ETA" was written by South Korean rapper Beenzino, Gigi, Ylva Dimberg, and 250, who also wrote "Get Up" with Freekind.

== Music and lyrics ==
"Compared to our previous releases, this new mini album definitely has a lot more variety to offer, in not just genre of music and dance style, but what we are striving to express and show to you."

— Hanni discussing the album in an interview with Rolling Stone.

Get Up comprises six tracks and is about 12 minutes long. It draws from R&B and eclectic styles of dance music, further embracing the genres first explored in OMG. Hanni described the EP as a representation of "NewJeans' summer", spanning a range of emotions and stories revolving around love. Get Up opens with "New Jeans". Inspired by UK garage and Jersey club, the percussion-driven track expresses NewJeans' desire to keep carving their own path and experimenting with new music, also referencing in the lyrics "So Fresh, So Clean" (2001) by American duo Outkast. "Super Shy" is a bubblegum liquid drum'n'bass and Jersey club song that features a staccato kick drum pattern in which NewJeans wish to overcome their shyness and confess to their first love.

"ETA", an acronym for estimated time of arrival, is a song based on mellow melodies that incorporates Think break-like funky drum breaks, "cozy" synths, and energetic choppy air horns taken from Debonair Samir's Baltimore club song "Samir's Theme". In the track, NewJeans encourage their friend to break up with their boyfriend due to his infidelity. Joshua Minsoo Kim of Pitchfork described it as the result of NewJeans' previous experiments with club music, namely Jersey club in "Cookie" and Baltimore club in "Ditto". "Cool with You" is a UK garage track driven by "effortless" melodies, "playful" ad-libs, layered harmonies, melismas, and whispered vocals. In the track, NewJeans candidly express their feelings toward a partner, uncaring of what others might say about them. The EP's interlude, "Get Up" is a "dreamy" R&B ballad based on atmospheric synths emphasizing NewJeans' airy harmonies. It alludes to a fight with a lover. The record closes with "ASAP", a "sweet" pop song that incorporates "bubbly" percussion, syncopated synths, and a ticking sound similar to that of a clock as a call-back to the first track. With woozy vocals, NewJeans sing about longing for a partner, whom they frequently call to share with them "life's small joys".

== Release and promotion ==
Get Up was released on July 21, 2023, a day before NewJeans' first anniversary since their debut. It was available in three different physical formats: a bag version, available in six variants, a box set version in collaboration with The Powerpuff Girls and a Weverse-exclusive version. All versions include a CD, a CD envelope, an outbox, three photo books, a lyric book, a photo card envelope, five photo cards, a sticker envelope, three stickers, five post cards and a bookmark. Other gadgets were exclusively available at stores such as Target, Weverse Shop Japan and Universal Music Store.

=== Singles ===
The EP's first single "Super Shy" was made available on streaming platforms and for digital download on July 7, 2023, alongside the B-side track "New Jeans". It was promoted in partnership with YouTube Shorts through a dance challenge released under the hashtag "ImSuperShy". In South Korea, "Super Shy" topped the Circle Digital Chart, earning NewJeans their third number-one single in the country. Internationally, "Super Shy" became the group's best-performing track on numerous charts, including the US Billboard Hot 100 and the UK Singles Chart, and reached number one in Hong Kong, Malaysia, Singapore, and Taiwan. "Cool with You" and "ETA" were released as the next singles along with the EP on July 21, 2023.

=== Visuals ===
In its first press release, ADOR stated that music videos would be released for each of the six tracks and teased "unprecedented collaborations with several global brands, as well as surprise guest appearances in the music videos". Ahead of the release, they posted videos teasing the music videos for "ETA" and "ASAP" on June 26 and 27, 2023. Produced by Min, all the music videos were released on Hybe's YouTube channel starting with "New Jeans" and "Super Shy" on July 7, 2023. The music video for "New Jeans" was directed by Youngeum Lee and created in collaboration with American animated television series The Powerpuff Girls to celebrate its 25th anniversary. It features NewJeans transforming into animated characters designed like the namesake Powerpuff Girls rendered in various animation styles. Directed by Shin Hee-won, the music video for "Super Shy" stars NewJeans performing the song across Lisbon, Portugal, in a series of impromptu flash mobs.

A two-part music video for "Cool with You" and "Get Up" was released on July 19, 2023, two days before the single's release. Starring NewJeans, actress Hoyeon and actors Micol Vela and Tony Leung, the music video reinterprets the myth of Cupid and Psyche. The music video for "ETA" was created in partnership with Apple and accompanied the EP's release. Shot on an iPhone 14 Pro, it features NewJeans exposing their friend's boyfriend as a cheater. Both music videos for "Cool with You" and "ETA" were shot in Barcelona, Spain, and directed by Wooseok Shin, who had previously worked with NewJeans on the music video for "Ditto". Directed by Jakyoung Kim, the music video for "ASAP" was released on July 26, 2023.

=== Live performances ===
To promote Get Up, NewJeans appeared on South Korean music shows Inkigayo and Music Bank to perform the tracks throughout July and August 2023. Two days after the release, they appeared on the YouTube web show IU's Palette, where they covered "Celebrity" (2021) originally released by host IU. On August 3, they had their first live performance in the United States at Lollapalooza, becoming the first K-pop girl group to perform at the festival. The 48-minute set covered their entire discography and gathered one of the biggest crowds ever for the 17:00 time slot according to the Chicago Sun-Times. The performance garnered positive reviews: Althea Legaspi of Rolling Stone said that NewJeans "were more than ready for the spotlight", while Rhian Daly of NME wrote in her four-star review that they lived up to the expectations. Daly appreciated the band rendition of their early songs and the energetic performances of the EP's tracks and concluded that by the end of the performance the group seemed "completely settled on stage", as if they had been "commanding audiences this big for years" despite their initial nervousness.

On August 11, NewJeans performed "ETA" at the K-pop Super Live concert, which served as the closing ceremony of the 25th World Scout Jamboree. On August 19, the group had their first live performance in Japan at the Summer Sonic Festival, where they performed most of their discography during the 40-minute set. The group attracted a large crowd despite performing at noon during a heat wave and the organizers had to restrict access to the venue for safety reasons. The founder of the festival, Naoki Shimizu, said the performance gathered the biggest crowd ever for the 12:00 time slot. Music critic Kim Do-heon deemed it a "historic moment", while Junji Oda of Mikiki called it a "decisive performance" that established "NewJeans' position in Japan and in Asia".

== Critical reception ==
Professional ratings
Review scores
Source	Rating
AllMusic	4/5 stars
IZM	2.5/5 stars
NME	5/5 stars
Pitchfork	7.6/10

Upon its release, Get Up featured in NPR's list of the best new music. In her five-star review for NME, Rhian Daly praised the six "flawless" songs and wrote that Get Up served as a "divine" introduction to NewJeans' second year, successfully establishing them as "the group to watch" in the K-pop music scene. Joshua Minsoo Kim of Pitchfork wrote that the group "channel the ecstasy of self-love and infatuation through lively dance music" while their "brisk, club-inflected pop songs cement them as one of the most interesting K-pop acts working today". Kim Do-heon reviewed the EP positively, describing it as "retro while being at the forefront of the trend". Music critic Kim Young-dae called Get Up the "highly refined result of tenacious pursuit of simplicity and intuitive sophistication" that "transcends genres and cultures".

=== Rankings ===
Get Up on critic lists
Publication	List	Rank	Ref.
Billboard	The 25 Best K-Pop Albums of 2023	23	
British GQ	The Best Albums of 2023	N/A	
Exclaim!	15 Best EPs of 2023	N/A	
The New York Times	Best Albums of 2023	4	
NME	The 25 best Asian albums of 2023	1	
Nylon	Top Albums of 2023	9	
Paste	The 20 Best K-pop Albums of 2023	1	
Paste	The 30 Best EPs of 2023	N/A	
Paste	The 30 Greatest K-Pop Albums of All Time	18	
Paste	The 100 Greatest EPs of All Time	52	
PopMatters	The 80 Best Albums of 2023	61	
Rolling Stone	The 100 Best Albums of 2023	33	
Slate	The 12 Best Albums of 2023	N/A	
Stereogum	25 Great EPs from 2023	N/A	
Wired	The 10 Best Albums of 2023	N/A	

=== Accolades ===
Awards and nominations for Get Up
Organization	Year	Award	Result	Ref.
Asian Pop Music Awards (Note: Hosted by the Hong Kong Asia Pacific International Group and Sunway Records, the Asian Pop Music Awards bases its winners on the "Asian Pop Music Chart" which opened in September 2019.)	2023	Top 20 Albums of the Year (Overseas)	Won	
Billboard Music Awards	2023	Top Global K-Pop Album	Nominated	
Korean Music Awards	2024	Album of the Year	Nominated	
Korean Music Awards	2024	Best K-pop Album	Won	
MAMA Awards	2023	Album of the Year	Shortlisted	
Melon Music Awards	2023	Millions Top 10 Artist	Won	
Melon Music Awards	2023	Album of the Year	Shortlisted	

== Commercial performance ==
According to the EP's distributor, YG Plus, Get Up exceeded 1.72 million stock pre-orders the day before the release, breaking NewJeans' previous record of 800,000 pre-orders for OMG. Hanteo Chart reported that the EP had sold 1,194,623 copies on its first day of release, becoming the group's third consecutive album to sell over one million copies. Get Up sold 1.65 million copies in its first week of release, becoming the second most-sold album by a K-pop female artist in its first week of release. The EP debuted at number two on the Circle Album Chart in the issue dated July 16–22, 2023, with 1,451,905 copies sold. The Weverse-exclusive version debuted at number four in the same chart issue with 271,895 copies sold. Critics noted that the functional design of the EP, shaped like a bag, contributed to its commercial success in South Korea.

In the United States, Get Up debuted at number one on the Billboard 200 in the issue dated August 5, 2023, earning NewJeans their first entry and number-one on the chart. NewJeans became the second K-pop girl group to top the chart after Blackpink, while the EP became one of only two albums (Note: The other being Blackpink's Born Pink (2022).) by a girl group to have reached number one on the chart in fifteen years, since Danity Kane's Welcome to the Dollhouse in 2008. It is also the 20th mostly non-English language album to top the chart, and the fourth of 2023. (Note: The other three being Stray Kids' 5-Star, Karol G's Mañana Será Bonito, and Tomorrow X Together's The Name Chapter: Temptation.) The EP opened with 126,500 album-equivalent units, of which 101,500 were pure album sales, and accumulated 34.39 million streams in its first week. It beat the soundtrack of American film Barbie (2023) in what Billboard described as "the year's closest race" for the number-one album by just 500 units. It sold 332,000 copies by the end of the year and was the fifth best-selling CD album in the United States according to Billboard. In Japan, Get Up debuted at number five on the Oricon Albums Chart in the issue dated July 17–23, 2023, with 27,304 copies sold. It rose to number four the following week with 15,768 copies sold.

== Track listing ==
Get Up track listing
No.	Title	Lyrics	Music	Arrangement	Length
1.	"New Jeans"	Gigi; Erika de Casier; Fine Glindvad Jensen; Haerin	Park Jin-su; Frankie Scoca; de Casier; Jensen	Park; Scoca	1:48
2.	"Super Shy"	Gigi; Kim Dong-hyun; de Casier; Kristine Bogan; Danielle	Scoca; de Casier; Bogan	Scoca	2:34
3.	"ETA"	Lim Sung-bin; Gigi; Ylva Dimberg	250; Dimberg	250	2:31
4.	"Cool with You"	Gigi; Kim; de Casier; Jensen; Danielle	Park; Scoca; de Casier; Jensen	Park; Scoca	2:27
5.	"Get Up"	Freekind	250; Freekind	250	0:36
6.	"ASAP"	Gigi; de Casier; Jensen; Catharina Stoltenberg; Henriette Motzfeldt; Danielle	250; Stoltenberg; Motzfeldt; de Casier; Jensen	250; Stoltenberg; Motzfeldt	2:14
Total length:					12:10

== Personnel ==
Credits are adapted from the EP's lyric book.

Locations

- Recorded, engineered and edited at Hybe Studio
- Mixed at Brecks Farmhouse Studios (2), The Sound Factory Studios, Los Angeles, California (3, 4), and Chapel Swing Studios, Valley Glen, Los Angeles (5)
- Mastered at Becker Mastering, Pasadena, California

Personnel

- Jinsu Park – instrumental, programming (1, 4)
- Frankie Scoca – instrumental, programming (1, 2, 4)
- 250 – instrumental, programming (3, 5, 6)
- Catharina Stoltenberg – instrumental, programming, vocal sampling (6)
- Henriette Motzfeldt – instrumental, programming (6)
- Heejin Min – vocal directing
- Jungwoo Jang – vocal directing
- NewJeans – background vocals
- Emily Kim – background vocals (2, 3, 4)
- Ylva Dimberg – vocal sampling (3)
- Fine Glindvad Jensen – vocal sampling (4)
- Pyungwook Lee – engineering (all tracks), vocal editing (1, 5)
- Bakyeong Wang – engineering (all tracks) vocal editing (3, 6)
- Yeji Cha – vocal editing (2, 3, 4)
- Phil Tan – mixing (1, 6)
- Nathan Boddy – mixing (2)
- Jonny Breakwell – mixing (3, 4)
- Tony Maserati – mixing (5)
- David K. Younghyun – mixing (5)
- Bill Zimmerman – additional engineering (1, 6)
- Dale Becker – mastering
- Heejin Min – producer, package design (beach bag)
- Keyon Kim – co-producer (A&R supervision)
- Jungwoo Jang – A&R
- Jungmin Nam – A&R
- Yeji Jeong – A&R
- Hanna Cho – international A&R
- Daebum Im – international A&R
- Yoona Shin – photography
- Siyoung Song – photography
- Yumi Choi – styling direction
- Hwabin Nam – styling assistance
- Mooseong Park – styling assistance
- Gabe Sin – hair styling (music videos)
- Iljung Lee – hair styling (record jacket)
- Minjung Kyung – hair styling (record jacket)
- Gilju Oh – make-up (music videos)
- Nakyeum Lee – make-up (music videos, record jacket)
- Yemin Kim – art direction, graphic design, package design (beach bag)
- Yusun Hwang – graphic design
- Hooyoung Eom – graphic design
- Jiyeon Choi – graphic design
- Bookyeong Lee – graphic design
- Youngjun Jung – new media contents direction
- Hyunjee Song – new media contents direction
- Dana Kim – new media contents direction
- Nayeon Kim – contents direction, 20/30 visualizing
- Miigo – illustration
- Theethru – web development
- Eunju Kim – performance director
- Younghoo Kim – performance director
- Jerricoo – performance director

== Charts ==
=== Weekly charts ===
Weekly chart performance
Chart (2023)	Peak position
Austrian Albums (Ö3 Austria)	7
Belgian Albums (Ultratop Flanders)	7
Belgian Albums (Ultratop Wallonia)	18
Canadian Albums (Billboard)	4
Dutch Albums (Album Top 100)	32
French Albums (SNEP)	5
German Albums (Offizielle Top 100)	10
Hungarian Albums (MAHASZ)	14
Irish Albums (IRMA)	19
Japanese Albums (Oricon)	4
Japanese Combined Albums (Oricon)	3
Japanese Hot Albums (Billboard Japan)	4
Lithuanian Albums (AGATA)	14
New Zealand Albums (RMNZ)	3
Polish Albums (ZPAV)	58
Scottish Albums (Official Charts)	3
South Korean Albums (Circle)	2
Spanish Albums (Promusicae)	25
Swedish Physical Albums (Sverigetopplistan)	3
Swiss Albums (Schweizer Hitparade)	8
UK Albums (Official Charts)	15
US Billboard 200	1
US World Albums (Billboard)	1

Chart performance
Chart (2026)	Peak position
Croatian International Albums (HDU)	19

=== Monthly charts ===
Monthly chart performance
Chart (2023)	Position
Japanese Albums (Oricon)	9
South Korean Albums (Circle)	3

=== Year-end charts ===
Year-end chart performance
Chart (2023)	Position
Belgian Albums (Ultratop Flanders)	155
French Albums (SNEP)	197
Japanese Albums (Oricon)	64
Japanese Hot Albums (Billboard Japan)	71
South Korean Albums (Circle)	17
US Billboard 200	134
US World Albums (Billboard)	4

Year-end chart performance
Chart (2024)	Position
US World Albums (Billboard)	3

== Sales and certifications ==
Sales and certifications for Get Up
Region	Certification	Certified units/sales
Japan	—	63,189
South Korea (KMCA)	Million	1,884,311
South Korea (KMCA) Weverse version	Platinum	449,287
United Kingdom (BPI)	Silver	60,000^{‡}
United States	—	332,000

== Release history ==
Release history and formats for Get Up
Region	Date	Format	Label	Ref.
Various	July 21, 2023	CD; digital download; streaming	ADOR	

== See also ==
- List of best-selling albums in South Korea
- List of best-selling albums by girl groups in South Korea
- List of Billboard 200 number-one albums of 2023
