= Min Hee-jin =

South Korean art director (born 1979)

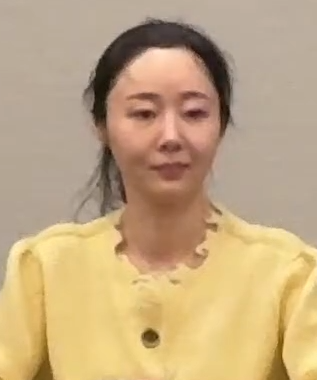
- Min in May 2024
- Born: December 16, 1979 (age 46); Seoul, South Korea
- Education: Seoul Women's University
- Occupations: Executive producer; art director; graphic designer; creative director
- Years active: 2002–present
- Employers: Art director and creative director at SM Entertainment (2002-2018); CBO of Hybe (2019-2021); CEO of ADOR (2021-2024); Founder and CEO of OOAK (since 2025)
- Known for: Executive director and creative director of NewJeans
- Board member of: SM Entertainment (2017-2018)

Korean name
- Hangul: 민희진
- RR: Min Huijin
- MR: Min Hŭijin

Min Hee-jin (Korean: 민희진; born December 16, 1979) is a South Korean creative director, art director and graphic designer. She is best known as the former executive producer of the K-pop girl group NewJeans and for the legal battles regarding its control.

Min worked at SM Entertainment from 2002 to 2018, starting as a graphic designer, then art director, before becoming creative director later on in 2012, and ultimately becoming part of the board of directors. She led the visual and conceptual identity of groups such as Girls' Generation, Shinee, f(x), Exo, and Red Velvet.

In 2019, she joined Hybe Corporation and oversaw the company's rebranding. She became the CEO of ADOR, a new Hybe subsidiary at the time, in November 2021 and launched NewJeans in July 2022.

Min left ADOR in 2024, following a protracted conflict with Hybe's top executives regarding NewJeans' control and activities. Since late 2025, she has been running a new agency named OOAK, aiming to produce a new boy group.

== Early life ==
Min was born on December 16, 1979, in Seoul, South Korea. She attended Seoul Women's University, where she received a degree in visual design.

== Career ==
=== 2002–2018: SM Entertainment ===
Min joined SM Entertainment in 2002 as a graphic designer and later rose to the position of creative director, where she led the visual branding of several K-pop groups, including Girls' Generation, Shinee, f(x), Exo, and Red Velvet. Her role at SM involved overseeing the planning and production of album artwork, costumes, and music videos, as well as shaping the overall brand identity of the artists through non-visual means. She is credited with shifting the visual direction of the K-pop industry towards a more concept-driven approach, particularly evident in her work on f(x)'s 2013 album Pink Tape. Min is also known for her innovative and experimental approach to art direction, which contrasted with the formulaic style typically used for first-generation K-pop idols. Notably, she created a special exhibition for the release of f(x)'s 4 Walls album (2015) and orchestrated the "Pathcode" game as part of promotions for Exo's Exodus (2015). Min was promoted to the board of directors at SM Entertainment in 2017, but due to burnout, she left the company by the end of 2018.

=== 2019–2024: Hybe Corporation ===
Min joined Hybe Corporation in 2019 as chief brand officer and oversaw the company's rebranding, including the design of the new logo and the new work space in Yongsan. She was appointed CEO of Hybe's new subsidiary ADOR (All Doors One Room) in November 2021. Min shared in a statement, "Our label won't hesitate to accept new challenges and strive to create artist IP and content containing ADOR's unique philosophy." The label unveiled its first girl group NewJeans in July 2022, with Min leading their creative direction and development. They released their debut self-titled extended play on August 1.

On August 27, 2024, Min was dismissed as the CEO of ADOR, following a protracted conflict with Hybe's top executives regarding NewJeans control and activities. She retained her position in the company's board of directors and as a producer of the group. Min has opposed the decision, stating that the dismissal is a "grave violation of the shareholders' agreement". On November 20, 2024, Min resigned from her director position at ADOR.

=== 2025–present: OOAK ===
In December 2025, Min revealed her plan to produce a boy group under her newly established entertainment agency OOAK (stylised as OOAK Records). In February 2026, the agency shared its first branding materials through social networks, noting that it was actively recruiting trainees.

== Controversies ==
=== Perceived sexualization of minors ===
Min has been accused by online users of drawing inspirations for the groups she manages from sexually charged media that involve minors. Min was seen sharing pictures of her apartment on Instagram which showcased images that refer to the 1974 film I'll Take Her Like a Father, among others. Min has also been accused of allowing revealing clothes that mimic those of school girls for f(x) and sexual innuendos on the lyrics of the track "Cookie" for NewJeans. In response, ADOR announced they have taken legal action against the allegations.

=== NewJeans contracts ===
On November 5, 2026, The New York Times published an investigation into the 2022 contracts between the members and ADOR. The report found that the agreements omitted several government-recommended safeguards for the underage members, including provisions concerning education, rest, and working conditions. It also reported that ADOR retained extensive rights to use the members' names, images, and voices, including in AI-generated content, even after the expiration of their contracts. Hybe said the agreements complied with South Korean law and were drawn up in good faith after discussions between ADOR and members. The company disputed conclusions from the investigation, stating that it followed child-protection requirements and had not pressured the members to give up their education or undergo cosmetic procedures. It also questioned the significance of concerns over contractual penalties, maintaining that a different calculation method would have made little difference.

The next day, ADOR issued a statement disputing the investigation, asserting that the contracts had been negotiated and finalized jointly by Min Hee-jin, the vice president she had appointed, the members and their parents, and the legal representatives of some members. The label maintained that the agreements contained provisions protecting the members' rights and that the controversial clauses neither disadvantaged them nor differed in their practical effect from the government-standard contract. Later that day, Min's representatives rejected claims that she had been responsible for the contracts, explaining that "ADOR had no independent legal team, and Hybe's legal team led the drafting and revision of the contracts". They noted that the agreements also required approval from Hybe's legal department, chief financial officer and chief executive officer, as well as its board of directors. In their view, this undermined the argument that individual labels had independent decision-making authority. They also maintained that the clauses concerning the use of the members' images and voices had been drafted and determined by Hybe's legal team, whilst in May 2024, it was alleged around the same time that a legal firm representing Min submitted a proposed amendment to her shareholder agreement with Hybe to them which included the proposal to be able to unilaterally terminate the member's contracts without informing their label's board, with the overall amendment rejected.

== Legal matters ==
=== Hybe ===
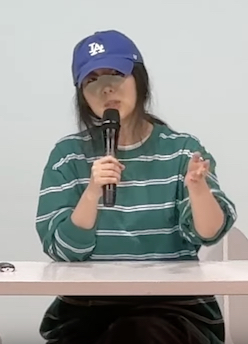
Min during a press conference in April 2024

On April 22, 2024, Hybe Corporation launched an internal audit of Min and other ADOR executives over allegations that they had attempted to take control of the company. Hybe also called for Min's resignation as ADOR's CEO. Min denied the allegations, arguing that taking control of ADOR would have been impossible because Hybe owned 80% of its shares. She said Hybe had sought her resignation after she raised concerns about similarities between the artistic direction of NewJeans and Illit, a girl group that debuted under Hybe subsidiary Belift Lab. Min also criticized Hybe chairman Bang Si-hyuk, who oversaw Illit's debut, for not addressing the similarities. The dispute coincided with a 12.17% decline in Hybe's share price.

Hybe subsequently disclosed findings from its investigation, including KakaoTalk messages between Min and ADOR's vice president. Media reports said the messages discussed possible ways to take control of NewJeans' activities. The company also filed a complaint against Min, accusing her of breach of trust.

Min held an emergency press conference on April 25, 2024, accompanied by two lawyers. She denied having a concrete plan to leave Hybe and said tensions with its executives had begun when Le Sserafim's debut was given priority over NewJeans'. Media coverage reflected divided public reactions. Some commentators viewed Min as a creative figure whose concerns had been overlooked, while others criticized her for naming other groups and making accusations of copying that they considered unfounded.

On May 7, Min filed an injunction seeking to prevent Hybe from exercising its voting rights at an upcoming shareholders' meeting, where she expected to be removed as ADOR's CEO. The court hearing began on May 17. Around the same time, NewJeans' members submitted a petition to the Seoul Central District Court opposing Min's dismissal.

On May 17, reports emerged of leaked KakaoTalk messages allegedly exchanged between Min and a colleague, in which she made disparaging remarks about NewJeans and their fans. Two days later, the members' parents also submitted a petition supporting Min. Several Hybe executives and employees from Pledis Entertainment and Source Music, including producers and creative directors associated with BTS, Le Sserafim and Tomorrow X Together, also reportedly submitted petitions in support of Hybe.

On May 30, the Seoul Central District Court granted Min's injunction, preventing Hybe from using its voting rights to dismiss her as CEO. The court found that, although Min had considered ways to gain control of ADOR, there was insufficient evidence that she had taken concrete steps to implement such a plan. At the subsequent shareholders' meeting, two ADOR executives considered close to Min were dismissed and replaced by Hybe-appointed board members.

On August 27, ADOR's board of directors dismissed Min as CEO and appointed Kim Joo-young as her successor. Hybe described the decision as part of its longstanding policy of separating production from management within its multi-label system. Min remained an inside director and was appointed as a producer, although reports indicated that she had not been assigned to a department responsible for production. She challenged the restructuring, describing it as a "grave violation of the shareholders' agreement".

Following the change in leadership, ADOR reassigned responsibilities for artist development, content planning and performance direction to Lee Do-kyung, an ADOR director and vice president responsible for management operations. Industry reports indicated that decisions concerning NewJeans' production and planning were subject to Lee's consultation or approval. Hybe and ADOR described the arrangement as a separation of production and management.

On September 11, NewJeans' members held a YouTube livestream in which they called on Hybe to reinstate Min as ADOR's CEO by September 25. Hybe's share price fell by nearly 3% the following day. In an October 17 interview with TV Asahi, Min reaffirmed her commitment to NewJeans and their future activities, stating that she "[has] a plan to overcome these challenges". On October 29, the Seoul Central District Court rejected Min's request for an injunction seeking reinstatement as ADOR's CEO.

On November 26, 2024, Min filed a criminal complaint against Hybe chief communications officer Park Tae-hee and a public relations director identified as Cho. Her representatives accused the executives of failing to fulfil their responsibilities and damaging NewJeans and ADOR by downplaying the group's achievements. They said they hoped the complaint would result in "appropriate criminal penalties". On December 2, the South Korean tabloid Dispatch published an article alleging that Min had influenced NewJeans' members against Hybe. Min subsequently filed a defamation lawsuit against two Dispatch reporters and two Hybe executives, alleging that the article had improperly used her private conversations.

On January 9, 2025, Davolink chairman Park Jung-kyu alleged in an interview that Min had attempted to recruit NewJeans away from ADOR. He said he had discussed potential investment with Min, including the possibility of the group leaving ADOR to sign exclusive contracts with another company.

During court proceedings in June 2025, evidence reportedly included claims that Min had helped draft emails subsequently released by the families of NJZ (formerly NewJeans). The issue was raised during the proceedings concerning her alleged involvement in the group's public statements.

On July 15, 2025, Yongsan Police Station cleared Min of the breach of trust allegations filed by Hybe in April 2024, citing insufficient evidence to pursue criminal charges. Hybe said it would appeal the decision, citing additional evidence and legal grounds for challenging the police's conclusion.

On February 12, 2026, a court ruled in Min's favour in two related cases: her lawsuit seeking payment under a put-option agreement and Hybe's lawsuit seeking confirmation that its shareholder agreement with her had been terminated. Subject to the final determination of her put-option entitlement, Min stood to receive ₩25.5 billion (US$19.03 million) from Hybe. (Note: Around US$17.7 million at time of verdict) On February 27, Min offered to waive her put-option rights in exchange for an end to the legal proceedings against her and other related parties. The proposal was reported on March 2, although it was not clear whether Hybe had accepted it.

On October 16, 2026, Min's representatives announced that the first hearing in Hybe's appeal concerning the shareholder agreement ruling had been scheduled for December 17 at the Seoul High Court. The appeal was assigned to a different judicial panel from the separate proceedings concerning payment under the put-option agreement. On November 4, the first hearing in the put-option appeal was also scheduled at the Seoul High Court, for December 9.

On November 16, Min was referred to the Seoul Western District Prosecutors' Office by Mapo Police Station on suspicion of occupational breach of trust, following an investigation into NewJeans' November 2024 announcement that they intended to terminate their exclusive contracts with ADOR. Police suspected that Min had influenced the group's decision to end their contracts. Two other former ADOR executives, identified by their surnames Lee and Shin, were also investigated but were cleared of suspicion and not referred for prosecution due to a lack of sufficient evidence. Her representatives denied that she had encouraged NewJeans to terminate their contracts and criticised the police for allegedly informing the media about the referral before formally notifying her. They questioned whether details of the investigation had been leaked and called for the matter to be examined. They also stressed that the referral was unrelated to the earlier investigation into Hybe's allegation that Min had attempted to take control of ADOR, which ended without her being referred for prosecution because of insufficient evidence.

==== Loan repayment towards the purchase of ADOR shares ====
In November 2024, TenAsia reported that Bang Si-hyuk had personally lent Min Hee-jin approximately ₩3.7 billion (US$2.76 million) in March 2023 to finance her purchase of 573,160 ADOR shares, representing an 18% stake in the company. The loan was reportedly separate from the shareholder agreement between Min and Hybe. TenAsia estimated that the outstanding balance, including interest at the statutory rate of 4.6%, had reached approximately ₩3.94 billion (US$2.94 million) by November 2024. Following Min's resignation as an ADOR inside director on November 20, Bang was reportedly considering legal action to recover the debt.

In October 2026, South Korean media reported that Bang had filed a civil lawsuit against Min seeking approximately ₩4.21 billion (US$3.14 million), including interest, in repayment of the loan. The original principal was reported to be approximately ₩3.74 billion (US$2.79 million), which Min had borrowed to purchase the 573,160 shares, equivalent to approximately 17.8% of ADOR.

According to the reports, Bang had applied for a payment order in April 2026. In May, the Seoul Western District Court ordered Min to repay the principal and interest. Min contested the order in July, prompting the matter to proceed as a civil lawsuit. The amount sought included approximately ₩500 million (US$373,057.49) in interest. The specific terms of the original loan agreement had not been publicly disclosed.

Min's representatives argued that the loan was connected to the parties' shareholder agreement and that the outstanding debt should be offset against amounts payable under the separate put-option dispute. They cited a first-instance ruling ordering Hybe to pay Min approximately ₩25.5 billion (US$19.03 million) under the put-option agreement. Hybe had appealed the decision, leaving the payment dispute unresolved when the October reports were published. In response to Bang's lawsuit, Min's representatives described the repayment demand as inconsistent with Hybe's failure to pay the put-option amount while the appeal was pending. They maintained that the parties' financial claims should be resolved through the legal proceedings.

=== Belift Lab ===
==== Civil case ====
On May 22, 2024, Belift Lab, the Hybe-affiliated agency representing Illit, filed a ₩2 billion (US$1.49 million) damages lawsuit against Min Hee-jin. The company alleged that Min's public accusations that Illit had copied NewJeans were false and had damaged its reputation and business interests, as well as those of its artists.

At the final hearing before the Seoul Western District Court on September 11, 2026, Belift Lab argued that Min had presented her accusations as facts rather than opinions, emphasizing that her position in the music industry had amplified their impact. It disputed her characterization of the remarks as questions or expressions of opinion. Min's representatives countered that her comments reflected concerns about similarities between the two groups and were made in response to Hybe's actions. The court closed arguments and scheduled its ruling for November 13, 2026.

On October 12, Belift Lab applied to reopen the proceedings. Min's representatives argued that doing so could delay the judgment. The court had not announced a decision on the application as of October 14.

Min separately filed a countersuit seeking ₩5 billion (US$3.73 million) in damages from Belift Lab, alleging that similarities between Illit and NewJeans had caused financial and emotional harm to her and NewJeans. The court also closed proceedings in this case on September 11, 2026, scheduling its first-instance ruling for November 13.

On November 13, the court dismissed both Belift Lab's lawsuit against Min and her countersuit against the company. Belift Lab expressed disappointment with the ruling, arguing that the court had effectively acknowledged the existence of victims without establishing who was responsible. It also criticized the court's treatment of Min's remarks as expressions of opinion and said it had not been given an opportunity to have newly submitted evidence examined. The company announced that it would appeal immediately.

==== Potential criminal case ====
On October 1, 2026, Yongsan Police Station referred former ADOR CEO Min Hee-jin and two former ADOR vice presidents to prosecutors on suspicion of business obstruction and defamation. The investigation concerned Min's April 2024 allegations that Belift Lab's girl group Illit had copied elements of NewJeans, including audition posters, hanbok photography concepts, debut strategy, and choreography. According to media reports, police found the allegations to be false and concluded that they had been made with the intention of damaging Hybe and Belift Lab.

Min's representatives disputed the police's findings, noting that a referral to prosecutors did not amount to a formal charge or a judicial ruling. They also questioned the consistency of the decision, pointing out that the same police station had previously declined to refer a separate complaint against Min. They further argued that concerns about similarities between Illit and NewJeans had been raised publicly before Min's April 2024 press conference.

==== Belift Lab's creative director ====
On August 24, 2026, it was reported that an employee of Hybe subsidiary Belift Lab had lost a civil damages lawsuit against former ADOR CEO Min Hee-jin. On August 21, the Seoul Western District Court's Civil Division 22 dismissed the employee's claims and ordered the plaintiff, identified as "A", to pay the legal costs. "A" had sought ₩100 million (US$74,611.5) plus interest from Min and a former ADOR vice president, identified as "S".

Described as Belift Lab's creative director, "A" filed the lawsuit over Min's April 2024 allegations that Illit had copied NewJeans. The plaintiff argued that Min's April 22 statement, April 25 press conference, subsequent court submissions and emails contained false claims that damaged their reputation. "A" also alleged that "S" had participated in the conduct and that Min's supporters had subjected them to online harassment.

The court dismissed the claims against both defendants. It found insufficient evidence that "S" had participated in or facilitated Min's alleged actions. Regarding Min, the court determined that "A" had not been sufficiently identified as the subject of her statements. Neither her initial statement nor her press conference named "A" or referred to their position at Belift Lab.

The court also considered Min's comments about similarities between Illit and NewJeans, including their hair, makeup, clothing, choreography, photography and videos. It regarded these remarks as concerning the groups as a whole rather than specifically identifying "A" as the person responsible for Illit's visual direction.

Regarding the alleged online harassment, the court noted that "A" had published and subsequently deleted several Instagram posts that were later circulated among Min's supporters. It found insufficient grounds to attribute the resulting attacks solely to Min's statements.

As the plaintiff had not been sufficiently identified in the allegedly defamatory remarks, the court found it unnecessary to determine whether Min's statements were false or otherwise unlawful. According to a subsequent report, "A" declined to appeal, making the dismissal final.

=== Source Music ===
On July 15, 2024, Source Music filed a ₩500 million (US$373,057.49) lawsuit against Min Hee-jin, alleging interference with its business operations, financial losses and breaches of contractual obligations. The dispute arose from Min's public statements about the formation of NewJeans, particularly her claims that she had selected the group's members while they were trainees at Source Music and that the company had neglected them. Source Music disputed these claims, arguing that they misrepresented the group's development and damaged its reputation and that of its affiliated artists, including Le Sserafim.

On August 22, 2025, the Seoul Central District Court admitted KakaoTalk messages belonging to Min as evidence. Her lawyers had challenged their admissibility, arguing that they had been obtained unlawfully. The court reportedly ruled that accessing the device using a known password did not violate communications privacy laws. It also rejected Source Music's request to submit a multimedia presentation, finding that oral arguments were sufficient. The next hearing was scheduled for November 7, 2025.

At the fourth hearing, on November 7, 2025, Source Music presented video recordings concerning the recruitment of NewJeans members and their trainee contracts. One recording showed a discussion in which a member's mother considered whether her daughter should remain with Source Music or transfer to another agency if the group's debut was not confirmed. The company submitted the footage to challenge Min's account of the group's formation and its treatment of the members.

The fifth hearing took place on December 19, 2025. Source Music reiterated that Min's statements had damaged its reputation and affected its affiliated artists. Min's representatives maintained that her remarks should be understood in the context of the wider dispute with HYBE and the circumstances surrounding NewJeans' formation. The court initially concluded oral arguments and scheduled a judgment for January 2026. However, Source Music subsequently applied to reopen proceedings to introduce additional evidence and witnesses, delaying the anticipated ruling.

The court resumed hearings during the first half of 2026, with both parties submitting further arguments. Source Music maintained that Min's statements were defamatory and had damaged its reputation and that of its affiliated artists. Min's legal team argued that her remarks were made in response to HYBE's audit of ADOR and its handling of the dispute in the media. They maintained that her comments concerned the circumstances surrounding NewJeans' formation rather than constituting unlawful attacks on Source Music or its artists.

On August 21, 2026, the court concluded oral arguments for a second time but did not immediately set a judgment date, indicating that it would await developments in related proceedings. Source Music subsequently sought to reopen arguments and introduce further evidence. Both parties submitted written arguments on whether proceedings should resume, with Min's representatives opposing further delays. The applications left the case unresolved despite the conclusion of oral arguments.

On November 13, 2026, the court dismissed Source Music's damages claim against Min and ordered the company to pay the litigation costs. The ruling was delivered alongside decisions in separate damages proceedings involving Min and Belift Lab. Source Music expressed disappointment, arguing that the court had not adequately considered the impact of Min's remarks on its artists or evidence that it believed demonstrated her malicious intent. The company maintained that the statements had damaged the label and caused psychological distress to artists who were not directly involved in the dispute. It announced that it would appeal the ruling, describing the judgment as unjust and stating that it would continue to defend its position and protect its artists.

=== ADOR ===
==== Party to Danielle Marsh v. ADOR ====
On 29 December 2025, ADOR, the Hybe-owned label representing NewJeans, announced the termination of former member Danielle Marsh's exclusive contract, stating that she could no longer continue as a member of the group. The agency also said it intended to pursue legal action against Marsh's family member and former ADOR CEO Min Hee-jin over their alleged involvement in the dispute. The following day, ADOR filed a civil lawsuit against Marsh, her family member and Min, seeking approximately ₩43.1 billion (US$32.16 million) (Note: Around US$30 million at the time of filing) in contractual penalties and damages. Following a review of its claims, ADOR subsequently reduced the amount sought to approximately ₩33.1 billion (US$24.7 million).

The first hearing was held at the Seoul Central District Court on 14 May 2026. At the second hearing, on 11 June, the parties disputed whether the claims against Min and Marsh's family member, which concerned alleged tortious conduct, should be separated from the contractual claims against Marsh. The court requested written submissions on the issue.

Later hearings addressed ADOR's calculation of its alleged financial losses, requests for the disclosure of advertising contracts and the defendants' potential liability for losses arising from the group's suspended activities. At the seventh hearing, held on 12 November 2026, the parties continued to present opposing arguments concerning the financial evidence and the calculation of damages. The court scheduled the next hearing for 10 December 2026.

==== Alleged coverup of workplace harassment ====
In March 2024, a former female ADOR employee filed an internal complaint alleging that a male executive had subjected her to workplace bullying and sexual harassment. She accused him of making sexist remarks, including a comment about dining with young women, and pressuring her to attend a dinner involving alcohol. An internal investigation closed the case without disciplinary action against the executive. The employee subsequently alleged that Min Hee-jin, then ADOR's CEO, had sided with the executive, disclosed details of the complaint to him, helped him prepare his response and declined to issue him a warning. The employee resigned on March 21, 2024.

On August 8, the former employee publicly accused Min of attempting to cover up the complaint and verbally abusing her during the dispute. In an Instagram post, she also alleged that Min had disclosed or edited excerpts of their private KakaoTalk conversations without her consent. Min denied the allegations in a statement on August 13, describing the employee's account as a distortion of events. She said the disagreement concerned the employee's work performance rather than harassment, maintained that she had attempted to mediate between the parties and noted that the executive denied making the alleged sexist remark. Min also described the employee's performance as a longstanding concern at ADOR.

The former employee disputed Min's account on August 15, arguing that she had not acted as a neutral mediator. She rejected the criticism of her work performance and alleged that the executive had privately apologised to Min over the incident. She also said she had provided additional documentation to Hybe after being informed that the complaint would be reinvestigated, and intended to pursue legal action against Min.

In March 2025, the Seoul Regional Employment and Labor Office issued a preliminary notice of a fine after determining that some of Min's conduct toward the employee constituted workplace harassment. The determination did not substantiate the separate allegation of sexual harassment against the male executive. Min's legal representatives disputed the findings, arguing that the facts had been misunderstood and that the decision involved an incorrect application of the Labor Standards Act. They said she would challenge the decision through administrative procedures.

On October 15, 2026, reports stated that the Seoul Western District Court had reopened arguments in the former employee's civil damages lawsuit against Min, postponing a judgment scheduled for that day.

Min's agency, OOAK, said the proceedings had been reopened following a request by her legal team to submit additional material concerning a separate defamation investigation. According to the agency, investigators had decided on May 27, 2026, not to refer that case for prosecution. Min's representatives argued that the decision was relevant to the civil proceedings. They added that they had refrained from commenting publicly while the lawsuit was ongoing but issued a statement in response to what they considered misleading media coverage.

The court scheduled the next hearing for November 26, 2026.

== Accolades ==
=== Awards and nominations ===
Name of the award ceremony, year presented, category, nominee(s) of the award, and the result of the nomination
Award ceremony	Year	Category	Nominee/work	Result	Ref.
Golden Disc Awards	2024	Producer Award	Min Hee-jin	Won	
Korea Content Awards (Note: Hosted by the Ministry of Culture, Sports and Tourism and the Korea Creative Content Agency, it awards content industry workers who have led the global cultural trend with K-content since 2009, and selects and awards excellent content.)	2023	Presidential Commendation	Min Hee-jin	Won	
MAMA Awards	2016	Best Visual & Art Director	Min Hee-jin	Won	
MAMA Awards	2022	Breakout Producer	Min Hee-jin	Won	
Seoul Culture Awards (Note: Hosted by the Seoul Metropolitan Government, it recognizes 11 artists and cultural figures who have contributed to the development of Seoul's culture and arts.)	2023	Seoul City Culture Award	Min Hee-jin	Won	

=== Listicles ===
Name of publisher, year listed, name of listicle, and placement
Publisher	Year	Listicle	Placement	Ref.
Billboard	2023	International Power Players	Placed	
Billboard	2023	Women in Music – Multisector	Placed	
Variety	2022	Women That Have Made an Impact in Global Entertainment	Placed	
