= New Jeans (song) =

Song by NewJeans

from the EP Get Up
- A-side: "Super Shy"
- Released: July 7, 2023
- Studio: Hybe
- Length: 1:48
- Label: ADOR
- Composers: Frankie Scoca; Park Jin-su; Erika de Casier; Fine Glindvad Jensen
- Lyricists: Gigi; Erika de Casier; Fine Glindvad Jensen; Haerin
- Producers: Frankie Scoca; Park Jin-su

Music video
- "New Jeans" on YouTube

"New Jeans" is a song by South Korean girl group NewJeans, taken from their second extended play (EP), Get Up (2023). ADOR, an independent division of Hybe, released the track for digital download and streaming as a B-side to the single "Super Shy" on July 7, 2023.

Frankie Scoca and Park Jin-su produced "New Jeans" and wrote it with Erika de Casier, Fine Glindvad Jensen, Gigi, and NewJeans member Haerin. The track incorporates influences from eclectic dance styles such as UK garage, Jersey club, jungle, and drum and bass in its rhythms and instruments. The lyrics are about the members' awareness of the attention on them and reference American duo Outkast's 2001 single "So Fresh, So Clean". Music critics complimented the production and dubbed it as the EP's mission statement.

Youngeum Lee directed the music video, which depicts NewJeans transforming to animated characters evoking The Powerpuff Girls, a result of a partnership to commemorate the series' 25th anniversary. The group performed the song on two music shows: Music Bank and Inkigayo. "New Jeans" peaked at number eight on the South Korean Circle Digital Chart, at number 32 on the Billboard Global 200, and in the top 15 of Billboard's Hits of the World charts for Hong Kong, Malaysia, Taiwan, and Vietnam. It also charted in Australia, Canada, and Japan, and on the UK Indie Chart and the US Bubbling Under Hot 100.

== Release and composition ==
Following the release of their first single album, OMG, in January 2023, ADOR CEO Min Hee-jin first revealed in an interview with South Korean magazine Cine21 that NewJeans was preparing a new album. In April 2023, Min stated in an interview with Billboard that the group had finished recording in early April. South Korean media outlets reported that the album would be released in July 2023, preceded by one of its B-side tracks set to be released on July 7. In June 2023, ADOR announced that NewJeans would release their second extended play (EP), Get Up, and revealed that its first lead single, "Super Shy", and one of the B-side tracks, "New Jeans", would be released on July 7, 2023, via YG Plus.

"New Jeans" was composed by Erika de Casier, Fine Glindvad Jensen, and producers Park Jin-su and Frankie Scoca. Inspired by UK garage and Jersey club, the percussion-driven track is based on jungle and drum and bass rhythms and incorporates "fluttering" harps. It features stuttering vocal chops and a "skipping" production. The lyrics were written by de Casier and Jensen, along with Gigi and group member Haerin. "New Jeans" expresses the group's desire to keep carving their own path and experimenting with new music, also referencing in the lyrics "So Fresh, So Clean" (2001) by American duo Outkast.

== Reception ==
"New Jeans" peaked at number 12 on South Korea's Circle Digital Chart in the issue dated July 16–22, 2023. In the United States, it debuted at number 5 and 16 on the World Digital Song Sales and the Bubbling Under Hot 100 Singles chart, respectively, in the issue dated July 22, 2023. The song also entered charts in Canada (82) and Australia (98). "New Jeans" debuted at number 32 on the Billboard Global 200 in the chart issue dated July 20, 2023.

In her five-star review of the EP, NME's Rhian Daly called the song a "subtle mission statement – a vow to keep carving out their own lane". Writing for Billboard, Starr Bowenbank said "New Jeans" is a "chill, laidback" track, while Sara Delgado of Teen Vogue described it as a "quasi-jingly number" with a "simple yet catchy hook and impeccable mixing that makes demo-esque layers feel maximalist".

== Music video and live performances ==
NewJeans collaborated with The Powerpuff Girls for the music video.

The music video for "New Jeans" was released a few hours before the track. It was directed by Youngeum Lee and created in collaboration with American franchise The Powerpuff Girls to commemorate its 25th anniversary. The video starts with NewJeans discussing what superpowers they would like to have, when they suddenly transform in animated characters version of themselves designed like The Powerpuff Girls and rendered in different animation styles, spanning from 2D animation to video game-style "pixelated" animation to 3D animation. Baek Seolhui, columnist for Weverse Magazine, applauded the Powerpuff Girls collaboration which they deemed congruent to the group's Y2K fashion styles and "natural" teenage-girl sensations.

NewJeans first performed the song on South Korean music show Music Bank on July 14, 2023, along with "Super Shy". The group also performed both songs on Inkigayo on July 16, 2023.

== Credits and personnel ==
Credits are adapted from the EP's lyric book.

Locations

- Recorded, engineered and edited at Hybe Studio
- Mastered at Becker Mastering, Pasadena, California

Personnel

- Jinsu Park – composition, instrumental, programming
- Frankie Scoca – composition, instrumental, programming
- Erika de Casier – composition, lyrics
- Fine Glindvad Jensen – composition, lyrics
- Gigi – lyrics
- Haerin – lyrics
- Heejin Min – vocal directing
- Jungwoo Jang – vocal directing
- NewJeans – background vocals
- Pyungwook Lee – engineering, vocal editing
- Bakyeong Wang – engineering
- Phil Tan – mixing
- Bill Zimmerman – additional engineering
- Dale Becker – mastering

== Charts ==
=== Weekly charts ===
Weekly chart performance
Chart (2023)	Peak position
Australia (ARIA)	98
Canada Hot 100 (Billboard)	82
Global 200 (Billboard)	32
Hong Kong (Billboard)	10
Japan Hot 100 (Billboard)	64
Japan Streaming (Oricon)	24
Malaysia (Billboard)	13
Malaysia International (RIM)	9
New Zealand Hot Singles (RMNZ)	6
Singapore (RIAS)	6
South Korea (Circle)	8
Taiwan (Billboard)	9
UK Indie (Official Charts)	50
US Bubbling Under Hot 100 (Billboard)	5
US World Digital Song Sales (Billboard)	5
Vietnam (Vietnam Hot 100)	14

=== Monthly charts ===
Monthly chart performance
Chart (2023)	Position
South Korea (Circle)	9

=== Year-end charts ===
2023 year-end chart performance for "New Jeans"
Chart (2023)	Position
South Korea (Circle)	74

2024 year-end chart performance for "New Jeans"
Chart (2024)	Position
South Korea (Circle)	142

== Certifications ==
Certifications
Region	Certification	Certified units/sales
Streaming
Japan (RIAJ)	Gold	50,000,000^{†}
^{†} Streaming-only figures based on certification alone.
