= ETA (song) =

2023 single by NewJeans

Song by NewJeans

from the EP Get Up
- Released: July 21, 2023
- Genre: Baltimore club
- Length: 2:31
- Label: ADOR
- Composers: 250; Dimberg
- Lyricists: Beenzino; Gigi; Ylva Dimberg
- Producer: 250

NewJeans chronology
"Cool with You" (2023)	"ETA" (2023)	"How Sweet" (2024)

Music video
- "ETA" on YouTube

"ETA" is a song by the South Korean idol girl group NewJeans from their second extended play (EP), Get Up (2023). ADOR released the song on July 21, 2023, as a single to promote the EP. "ETA" was written by Beenzino, Gigi, and Ylva Dimberg whilst composition was handled by 250 and Dimberg. Its accompanying music video, a collaboration with Apple, was filmed in Barcelona and shot entirely on the iPhone 14 Pro.

== Background and composition ==
NewJeans first unveiled "ETA" during their Bunnies Camp fan meeting concert in Seoul on July 1–2, 2023. "ETA", which stands for "estimated time of arrival", is an upbeat Baltimore club track that utilizes funky, choppy air horns and scurried drum breaks while at the same time consisting of a "mellow" melody.

== Music video ==
The music video for "ETA" was uploaded alongside the release of Get Up. A collaboration with Apple, the visual was shot entirely on an iPhone 14 Pro and was filmed in Barcelona, where the video for "Cool with You" was also filmed. The music video depicts NewJeans attending a pool party and discovering that their friend's boyfriend was cheating on her. Towards the end of the video, her boyfriend and his newfound lover are stuffed in the trunk of a car.

== Reception and accolades ==
"ETA" was named the best K-pop song of 2023 by Business Insider, and amongst the best songs of 2023 by Elle. Apple's campaign and "ETA"'s music video received awards at the One Show, the Spikes Asia Awards, and the New York Festivals Advertising Awards. The song received four music show awards, twice on both M Countdown and Inkigayo.

Music program awards for "ETA"
Program	Date	Ref.
M Countdown	August 10, 2023	
M Countdown	August 17, 2023	
Inkigayo	September 3, 2023	
Inkigayo	September 10, 2023	

== Credits and personnel ==
Credits are adapted from Melon.

- NewJeans – vocalists
- Beenzino (Lim Sung-bin) – lyricist
- Gigi (Kim Hyun-ji) – lyricist
- Ylva Dimberg – lyricist, composer
- 250 (Lee Ho-hyung) – composer, instrumental, programming

== Charts ==
=== Weekly charts ===
Weekly chart performance
Chart (2023)	Peak position
Australia (ARIA)	34
Canada Hot 100 (Billboard)	48
Global 200 (Billboard)	12
Hong Kong (Billboard)	3
Indonesia (Billboard)	23
Japan (Japan Hot 100)	8
Japan Combined Singles (Oricon)	10
Malaysia (Billboard)	5
Malaysia International (RIM)	4
New Zealand (Recorded Music NZ)	36
Philippines (Billboard)	24
Singapore (RIAS)	3
South Korea (Circle)	2
Taiwan (Billboard)	5
UK Independent (Official Charts)	44
US Billboard Hot 100	81
US World Digital Song Sales (Billboard)	5
Vietnam (Vietnam Hot 100)	11

=== Monthly charts ===
Monthly chart performance
Chart (2023)	Position
South Korea (Circle)	2

=== Year-end charts ===
2023 year-end chart performance for "ETA"
Chart (2023)	Position
Global 200 (Billboard)	197
South Korea (Circle)	24

2024 year-end chart performance for "ETA"
Chart (2024)	Position
South Korea (Circle)	34

2025 year-end chart performance for "ETA"
Chart (2025)	Position
South Korea (Circle)	134

== Certifications ==
Certifications
Region	Certification	Certified units/sales
New Zealand (RMNZ)	Gold	15,000^{‡}
Streaming
Japan (RIAJ)	Platinum	100,000,000^{†}
South Korea (KMCA)	Platinum	100,000,000^{†}
^{‡} Sales+streaming figures based on certification alone.^{†} Streaming-only figures based on certification alone.

== Release history ==
Release history for "ETA"
Region	Date	Format	Label	Ref.
Various	July 21, 2023	Digital download; streaming	ADOR	
