= NJWMX =

Remix album by NewJeans
- Released: December 19, 2023
- Length: 42:35
- Language: Korean; English
- Label: ADOR; YG Plus
- Producer: 250; FRNK

NewJeans chronology
Get Up (2023)	NJWMX (2023)	How Sweet (2024)

NJWMX is the first remix album by South Korean girl group NewJeans. It was released on December 19, 2023, through ADOR. It features six remixed versions of songs from the group's first two projects, New Jeans and OMG, as well as their respective instrumental versions. Pitchfork included NJWMX in its weekly list of the best new albums, highlighting the remixed bluegrass version of "Hurt" as a standout.

== Track listing ==
NJWMX track listing
No.	Title	Lyrics	Music	Remixer	Length
1.	"Ditto" (250 remix)	Ylva Dimberg; The Black Skirts; Oohyo; Minji	250; Ylva Dimberg	250	3:22
2.	"OMG" (FRNK remix)	Gigi; Ylva Dimberg; Hanni	Park Jin-su; Ylva Dimberg; David Dawood	Park Jin-su	3:30
3.	"Attention" (250 remix)	Gigi; Duckbay; Danielle	250; Duckbay	250	3:01
4.	"Hype Boy" (250 remix)	Gigi; Ylva Dimberg; Hanni	250; Ylva Dimberg	250	4:11
5.	"Cookie" (FRNK remix)	Gigi; Ylva Dimberg	Park Jin-su; Ylva Dimberg	Park Jin-su	3:32
6.	"Hurt" (250 remix)	Gigi; Amanda Lundstedt	250; Amanda Lundstedt	250	3:44
7.	"Ditto" (250 remix instrumental)		250; Ylva Dimberg	250	3:22
8.	"OMG" (FRNK remix instrumental)		Park Jin-su; Ylva Dimberg; David Dawood	Park Jin-su	3:30
9.	"Attention" (250 remix instrumental)		250; Duckbay	250	3:01
10.	"Hype Boy" (250 remix instrumental)		250; Ylva Dimberg	250	4:11
11.	"Cookie" (FRNK remix instrumental)		Park Jin-su; Ylva Dimberg	Park Jin-su	3:32
12.	"Hurt" (250 remix instrumental)		250; Amanda Lundstedt	250	3:36
Total length:					42:35

== Charts ==
Chart performance for NJWMX
Chart (2023)	Peak position
Japanese Digital Albums (Oricon)	14
Japanese Hot Albums (Billboard Japan)	62
