= Bubble Gum (NewJeans song) =

Song by NewJeans

from the album How Sweet
- Language: English; Korean
- A-side: "How Sweet"
- Released: May 24, 2024
- Genre: Pop; R&B
- Length: 3:20
- Label: ADOR
- Composers: 250; Oscar Bell; Sophie Simmons
- Lyricists: Gigi; Sophie Simmons; Oscar Bell
- Producer: 250

Music video
- "Bubble Gum" on YouTube

"Bubble Gum" is a song by South Korean girl group NewJeans. It was released by ADOR on May 24, 2024, as a B-side on the group's second single album How Sweet (2024). NewJeans began promoting the song on April 27, 2024, through the release of a music video on YouTube. The single album debuted at number one in South Korea.

== Background ==
After debuting in 2022, South Korean girl group NewJeans had their international breakthrough in 2023 with the release of the single album OMG and their second extended play (EP), Get Up. In January 2023, NewJeans entered the Billboard Hot 100 for the first time with the singles "Ditto" and "OMG". In South Korea, "Ditto" became the most successful song of the year, topping the Circle Digital Chart for a record-breaking thirteen weeks, receiving numerous accolades, and introducing the breakbeat trend in the K-pop music industry. Released in July 2023, Get Up internationally established NewJeans as one of the most prominent music acts of the year, becoming the group's first entry and number-one on the Billboard 200, selling over two million copies, and being named among the best albums of 2023 by several publications.

== Music and lyrics ==
"Bubble Gum" is a pop, and R&B track containing lyrics in both English and Korean.

== Copyright claim ==
In July 2024, British jazz-funk band Shakatak alleged that "Bubble Gum" infringed the copyright of their 1981 song "Easier Said Than Done". Through its publisher, Wise Music Group, the band sent a letter of claim to ADOR, Hybe, the Korea Music Copyright Association, and Sony Music Publishing Hong Kong, arguing that the songs shared similar melodies, rhythmic patterns, instrumentation, harmonic progression, and tempo, and requested that use of "Bubble Gum" cease and that compensation be paid.

ADOR denied the allegations, stating that it had responded to the legal notice on June 21 on behalf of the songwriters, asserting that "Bubble Gum" did not unlawfully use Shakatak's composition. The agency requested that Wise Music Group provide a "credible analysis report" supporting its claims, stating that the burden of proof rested with the accuser.

Following ADOR's response, Shakatak announced that Wise Music Group had retained a musicologist to examine the similarities between the two songs and stated that it would continue pursuing the matter.

On July 23, ADOR released a detailed statement reiterating that the songwriters had not been familiar with "Easier Said Than Done" before the allegations were raised. The agency said it had commissioned independent musicological analyses before the legal dispute became public and argued that the two songs differed in chord progression, tempo, and overall musical character. ADOR also criticized what it described as selective media reporting of the dispute amid its ongoing conflict with Hybe.

== Release and promotion ==
The music video for "Bubble Gum" was released on April 27, 2024. It was directed by Youngeum Lee and gained over six million views in 15 hours. In the video, the members are seen enjoying a summer day, blowing bubbles, weaving friendship bracelets, making balloon animals, and playing with soap bubbles and marbles in a variety of settings. A snippet of the Japanese version of "Bubble Gum" became available on April 8, 2024, after being featured on Japanese television in Kao's advertisement for their hair care brand Essential and in the morning show Mezamashi 8 as its new theme song.

"Bubble Gum" was later released on the single album How Sweet along with the song of the same name; the album debuted at the number one spot on the Circle Chart in South Korea.

== Commercial performance ==
Prior to the official release, "Bubble Gum" debuted at number 15 on Billboard's Hits of the World chart for South Korea and number 166 on the Billboard Global Excl. US in the chart issue dated May 11, 2024. The track also topped the popular music video and popular song categories on YouTube Korea.

== Charts ==
=== Weekly charts ===
Weekly chart performance
Chart (2024)	Peak position
Global 200 (Billboard)	30
Hong Kong (Billboard)	4
Japan Hot 100 (Billboard)	40
Japan Digital Singles (Oricon)	18
Japan Streaming (Oricon)	41
Malaysia (Billboard)	24
Malaysia International (RIM)	19
New Zealand Hot Singles (RMNZ)	5
Singapore (RIAS)	11
South Korea (Circle)	3
Taiwan (Billboard)	7
US World Digital Song Sales (Billboard)	6

=== Monthly charts ===
Monthly chart performance
Chart (2024)	Position
South Korea (Circle)	3

=== Year-end charts ===
Year-end chart performance
Chart	Year	Position
South Korea (Circle)	2024	33
South Korea (Circle)	2025	104

== Certifications ==
Certifications
Region	Certification	Certified units/sales
Streaming
Japan (RIAJ)	Gold	50,000,000^{†}
^{†} Streaming-only figures based on certification alone.
