= Moonshine (mixtape) =

Mixtape by Kim Ximya and D. Sanders
- Released: November 28, 2017
- Genre: Hip hop
- Length: 33:00
- Label: Beasts And Natives Alike (BANA)
- Producer: Dong Hyun Kim; Desmond Sanders

Kim Ximya chronology
Moonshine (2017)	Bundle1 (2020)

D. Sanders chronology
Moonshine (2017)	Find the Time (2020)

Moonshine is the mixtape by South Korean rapper Kim Ximya and record producer D. Sanders. The album was released on 28 November 2017.

== Background ==
Kim Ximya is a member of XXX, and D. Sanders is a former Top Dawg Entertainment record producer. They had also released collaboration singles Chamber and Manual before the release of mixtapes. The track Flowers was made into a music video and featured E Sens in a cameo. The album's name is derived from the whiskey moonshine, which was made in Tennessee during the prohibition in the United States.

== Critical reception ==
Professional ratings
Review scores
Source	Rating
IZM	3.5/5 stars
Rhythmer	4/5 stars

Lee Jinseok of Rhythmer described the album as a "one MC 1 producer" format album that created a structured work without hurting each other's style. The member of the selection committee for the 2018 Korean Music Awards Nam Seonghoon evaluated Kim Ximya's lyrics as lyrics that show superiority and emptiness, and described D. Sanders' production as "It creates an excellent sound while bringing out the vintage texture, and ironically, it does not lose its sophisticated style."

== Track listing ==
No.	Title	Length
1.	"Moonshine"	2:15
2.	"Process"	2:30
3.	"Closecall"	2:51
4.	"Take a Look" (featuring Masta Wu)	3:38
5.	"Flowers"	3:19
6.	"Love Like" ("사랑같은건")	2:51
7.	"Dance"	3:08
8.	"Money Flows"	3:25
9.	"Comintoya" (featuring ELHAE)	3:34
10.	"Outro"	2:20
11.	"Baggage Claim"	3:09
