= Minji (singer) =

South Korean singer (born 2004)

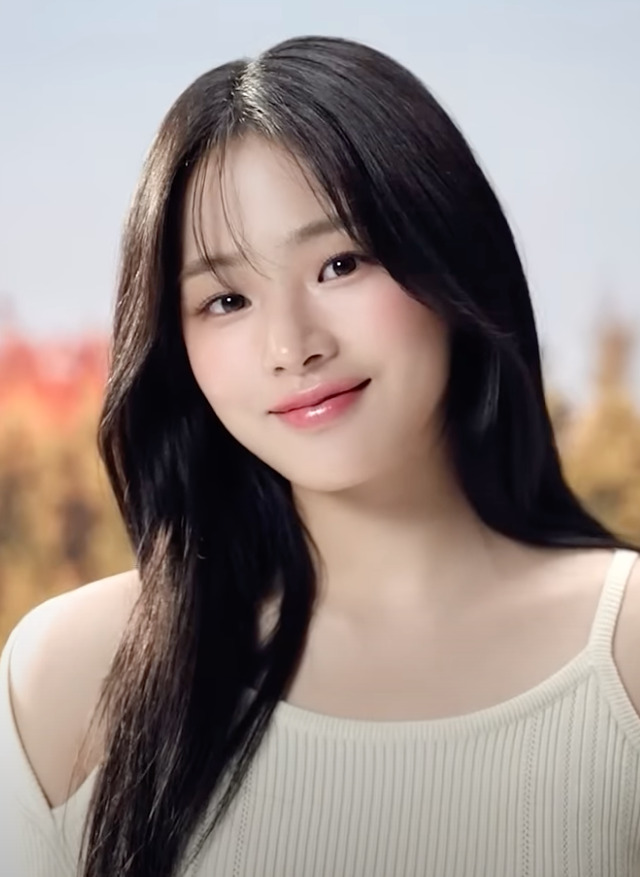
- Minji in 2024
- Born: Kim Min-ji; May 7, 2004 (age 22); Chuncheon, South Korea
- Occupation: Singer
- Musical career
- Genre: K-pop
- Instrument: Vocals
- Years active: 2022–present
- Label: ADOR
- Member of: NewJeans

Korean name
- Hangul: 김민지
- RR: Gim Minji
- MR: Kim Minji

Signature
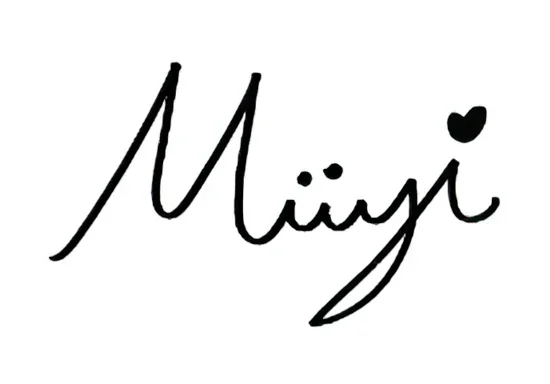

Kim Min-ji (Korean: 김민지; born May 7, 2004), known mononymously as Minji, is a South Korean singer. Minji made her debut as a member of the South Korean girl group NewJeans, under the record label ADOR on July 22, 2022.

== Early life and education ==
Kim Min-ji was born on May 7, 2004, in Chuncheon, South Korea. She is the middle of three children, with a younger sister and an older brother who attends Kyung Hee University, the latter of whom she revealed while performing at a music festival hosted by the university. During her elementary years, she learned English while studying abroad in Canada as a homestay transfer student. Minji attended Hanlim Multi Art School, where she graduated in February 2023.

Minji, during middle school, received numerous business cards from various entertainment agencies, including SM Entertainment. She was a Source Music trainee beginning in 2017 up until the company was acquired by Hybe Corporation in 2019.

== Career ==
=== 2019–2021: Pre-debut activities ===
Pre-debut, Minji was also known as "The Girl", the face of Hybe Corporation's 2019 Plus Global Auditions. In July 2021, she made a cameo appearance in BTS' music video for "Permission to Dance", alongside group member Hanni.

=== 2022–present: Debut with NewJeans and solo activities ===
Minji debuted as a member of the South Korean girl group NewJeans with the surprise-released music video for their debut single "Attention" on July 22, 2022, without any prior promotion or information on the group's lineup. NewJeans quickly rose to widespread popularity with the success of their following singles: "Hype Boy", "OMG", and "Ditto", the latter of which featured lyrics written by Minji. "Ditto" became NewJeans's first entry on Billboard Hot 100 and won Song of the Year at the MAMA Awards, the Melon Music Awards, the Golden Disc Awards, and the Asia Artist Awards.

On October 15, 2022, Minji made an appearance as one of the special MCs at KCON Japan alongside Junki Kono of JO1 and Hwang Min-hyun of NU'EST.

== Endorsements ==
Minji has topped South Korea's brand reputation rankings for K-pop artists numerous times since her debut. On February 13, 2023, Chanel Korea announced that they had signed Minji as one of their brand ambassadors for the categories of beauty, fashion, and watches and jewelry. Minji is the first person to be named ambassador for all three categories at the same time.

Since 2023, Minji has been the face of the Seoul Jazz Festival, appearing on magazines to promote the event. She appeared on the cover of W Korea's special edition for the 15th anniversary of the Seoul Jazz Festival as well as the cover of the W Korea's special edition for the 2024 festival.

Minji also appeared in a March 2024 video campaign for the South Korean National Election Commission broadcast on radio and other platforms to encourage younger generations to vote in the 22nd legislative election.

== Discography ==
=== Songwriting credits ===
All credits are adapted from the Korea Music Copyright Association, unless cited otherwise.

List of songs, showing year of release, artist's name and album name
Year	Artist	Song	Album	Lyricist	
Year	Artist	Song	Album	Credited	With
2022	NewJeans	"Ditto"	OMG	Yes	Oohyo, Ylva Dimberg, The Black Skirts & 250
2024	NewJeans	"Supernatural"	Non-album single	Yes	Gigi, Ylva Dimberg & Pharrell Williams

== Videography ==
=== Music video appearances ===
Year	Title	Artist	Ref.
2021	"Permission to Dance"	BTS	

== Filmography ==
=== Hosting ===
Year	Title	Notes	Ref.
2023	KCON 2022 Japan	With Junki Kono of JO1 and Hwang Min-hyun of NU'EST	
