= Clean & Clear (album) =

Studio album by Jowall
- Released: January 1, 2013
- Genre: Noise pop, shoegaze
- Length: 43:02
- Label: MO records

Jowall chronology
Things You Are Going to See Here (2009)	Clean & Clear (2013)	To Celebrate Nothing (2020)

Clean & Clear (Korean: 깨끗하게, 맑게,; RR: Ggaeggeuthage malgge) is the second studio album by South Korean shoegaze musician Jowall. The album was released on 1 January 2013.

== Background ==
After the release of Jowall's debut solo album, Things You Are Going to See Here, he had a joint concert with Han Sangcheol, the guitarist of Bulssazo in 2012. He interviewed that he wanted to get out of the gloom of his first album and show his bright side, and he described the album as "an image of early evening." The album cover art was designed by fellow Byul.org member Cho Taesang, who is also his brother.

== Critical reception ==
Na Wonyoung of Weiv described the album as "Rough or lo-fi noise was refined more neatly, but all these sounds were located in the right place to create a clear composition narrative, which captured lyricism very beautifully." GQ Korea picked Worst-Fated (악연), the last track of the album, as the best last track of 2013, and said "It's the 'space' that's created by overlapping sounds, and it tells you a melody that you can't say with the name of the world."

== Track listing ==
No.	Title	Length
1.	"We Will Never Do This Again" ("다시는 이러면 안 돼")	3:42
2.	"Clean & Clear" ("깨끗하게, 맑게,")	3:27
3.	"Night Night" ("밤밤")	3:43
4.	"Like-Minded" ("같은 마음")	4:02
5.	"Anthem" ("노래")	4:18
6.	"Cooku" ("쿠쿠")	2:20
7.	"Electroland" ("전자랜드")	4:08
8.	"Sentences" ("평서문")	5:11
9.	"Worst-Fated" ("악연")	7:06
