= Ppong (album) =

Studio album by 250
- Released: March 18, 2022
- Genre: Electronic Dance Music, ppongjjak disco
- Length: 45:47
- Label: Beasts And Natives Alike

250 chronology
One Night Stand (2014)	Ppong (2022)

Ppong (Korean: 뽕) is the second studio album by South Korean musician 250. The album was released on 18 March 2022 through Beasts And Natives Alike. Through the album, 250 won Musician of the Year, Album of the Year, Best Electronic Album, and Best Electronic Song at the 2023 Korean Music Awards.

== Background ==
He was interested in trot and pponggjjak, the Korean music genres, and in an interview with the JoongAng Ilbo, he said "Ppongjjak is forever popular music to Koreans, and "ppongki (뽕끼, the word that refers to the genre atmosphere of "ppongjjak")" is also a core-like emotion to Koreans. So, if you're a musician in Korea, you should start with 'ppong', but no one was doing it, so I started it naturally." about the reason for making the album. He released a documentary about the album's production process Finding Ppong (뽕을 찾아서), and cameo featured Han Sangcheol of Bulssazo, saxophonist Lee Jeongsik and keyboardist Kim Sooil.

== Critical reception ==
Yeolsimhee of Music Y described the album as "Ppong is certainly a listening experience of the year for almost all listeners in Korea, and I think it will remain a guide to a masterpiece that is exemplary for future extraordinary producers but extremely difficult to reproduce." The member of the selection committee for the Korean Music Awards Kwon Ikdo reviewed "It's the masterpiece of the year, which based on the pastry called Ppong, which combines the diachronic consideration of Korean popular music."

Publication	List	Rank	Ref.
Music Y	Album of the Year of 2022	1	

== Track listing ==
No.	Title	Length
1.	"It Was All a Dream" ("모든 것이 꿈이었네")	4:16
2.	"Bang Bus" ("뱅버스")	4:00
3.	"Love Story" ("사랑이야기")	4:14
4.	"Rear Window" ("이창")	4:45
5.	"...And Then There Were None" ("...그리고 아무도 없었다")	4:37
6.	"Barabogo" ("바라보고")	2:48
7.	"I Love You" ("나는 너를 사랑해")	4:06
8.	"Give Me" ("주세요")	3:46
9.	"Royal Blue" ("로얄 블루")	4:37
10.	"Red Glass" ("레드 글라스")	4:03
11.	"Finale" ("휘날레")	4:35
