= Sobrightttttttt =

Studio album by Sogumm
- Released: October 21, 2019
- Genre: Electronic, R&B, ambient
- Length: 26:54
- Label: Balming Tiger

Sogumm chronology
Not My Fault (2019)	Sobrightttttttt (2019)	Precious (2021)

Sobrightttttttt is the debut studio album of South Korean singer-songwriter Sogumm. It was released on October 21, 2019, through Balming Tiger. It was later nominated for Best R&B Album at the Korean Music Awards.

== Background ==
In an interview with Hypebeast Korea, Sogumm shared the story behind the album title.

My real name is So-hee. Its Chinese characters mean white and bright. I always say "so bright" to describe myself, so I thought that it was perfect for the title of my first album.

== Music and lyrics ==
Wnjn actively uses a synthesizer with damp texture on top of electronic and ambient sounds and creates a unique mood by throwing in unusual sources. Meanwhile, Sogumm's vocal sounds as if she is whispering next to you in her characteristic mumbling tone creating a "wavy" groove.

Sogumm "sinks down lifelessly" while sending a negative message in "Kill Me" but immediately shows off her brilliance and energy in "Dance!". She breaks the boundaries between rapping and singing in "Kimchisoup" but sings "So Fast" clearly on a vivid acoustic guitar melody. She expresses her complex emotions while repeating electronic piano sounds on a boom bap beat in "Smile".

== Critical reception ==
Hwang Du-ha of Rhythmer rated the album 4 out of 5 stars. He wrote that it "presents a new side of alternative R&B".

Kim Do-heon of IZM rated the album 2.5 out of 5 stars. He wrote that it is suitable for telling listeners what kind of musician Sogumm is. However, it is not memorable because "only the senses and emotions remain and the rest is a blur."

=== Year-end lists ===
Publication	List	Rank	Ref.
Rhythmer	10 Best Korean R&B Albums of 2019	1	
Rhythmer	10 Best Korean R&B Albums of the 2010s	7	

== Awards and nominations ==
Award	Year	Category	Result	Ref.
Korean Music Awards	2020	Best R&B Album	Nominated	
Korean Hip-hop Awards	2020	R&B Album of the Year	Nominated	

== Track listing ==
All lyrics are written by Sogumm; all music is composed by BJ Wnjn.

No.	Title	Length
1.	"Kill Me"	2:42
2.	"Dance!"	1:51
3.	"BadBadBad"	2:27
4.	"Delicious"	2:09
5.	"So Fast" (무슨 바람이 불었나)	2;33
6.	"More Love"	2:33
7.	"Stand Alone"	0:57
8.	"Kimchisoup"	2:00
9.	"Naholozipae" (나 홀로 집에)	1:55
10.	"Take a Waltz"	3:38
11.	"Holdinon"	2:18
12.	"Smile"	1:47
Total length:		26:54
