= Banquo: It Will Be Rain Tonight / 1st Murderer: Let It Come Down =

Studio album by Bulssazo
- Released: October 20, 2011
- Genre: Noise rock, post-rock, shoegaze
- Length: 38:49
- Label: Pastel, Beatball Music
- Producer: Park Hyeonmin

Bulssazo chronology
I Will Laugh When You Meet Disaster, And I Will Laugh At You When Fear Comes to You (Proverbs 1:26) (2006)	Banquo: It Will Be Rain Tonight / 1st Murderer: Let It Come Down (2011)	Korean Hiphop (2016)

Banquo: It Will Be Rain Tonight / 1st Murderer: Let It Come Down (Korean: 뱅쿠오: 오늘밤 비가 내릴 모양이구나. / 첫번째 암살자: 운명을 받아 들여라.) is the third studio album by South Korean rock band Bulssazo. The album was released on 20 October 2011. At the time of its first release, the album was released only on cassette tapes, which were later released on vinyl, CDs, and online releases.

== Background ==
The album's name is a quote from Macbeth's line in Chapter 3 of Act 3. At the time of its release in 2011, the album was released only on cassette tapes, and band member Han Sangcheol described the reason why it was released only on cassette tapes as "Our music is divided between likes and dislikes, so we only released it on cassette tape so that people who really want to listen to it can listen to it." The album was subsequently re-released on vinyl in 2015, later on CD and online release.

== Critical reception ==
Professional ratings
Review scores
Source	Rating
Weiv	9/10

Im Seungkyoon of Weiv reviewed "Banquo: It Will Be Rain Tonight / 1st Murderer: Let It Come Down was entirely made as the band wished. And that's exactly what allowed Bulssazo to become the most original sounding band in Korea." Music webzine Tonplein ranked the album to 40 in the best Korean albums of the 2010s.

== Track listing ==
No.	Title	Length
1.	"Teenage Love"	4:50
2.	"Yeonbyeon-Jackson" ("연변잭슨")	4:22
3.	"Your heart knows that many times you yourself have cursed others (Ecclesiastes 7:22)" ("너도 가끔 사람을 저주한 것을 네 마음이 아느니라 (전도서 7: 22)")	4:16
4.	"The Wrath of King" ("임금님의 분노")	5:13
5.	"Letters from Sadoseja" ("사도세자의 편지")	4:20
6.	"80's Love Groove (Flow of Century)"	3:53
7.	"18" ("이 곡은 두번에 걸쳐 만들어졌다.")	3:31
8.	"The Farmer from Hell" ("지옥에서 온 농부")	6:23
9.	"Adieu Foulard, Adieu Madras" ("송가 (마르티니크 섬 민요)")	2:01
