= Jowall =

South Korean post-rock musician

- Also known as: Kim Mak
- Born: 1978-1979
- Origin: Seoul, South Korea
- Genres: Post-rock; shoegaze
- Years active: 2000–present
- Labels: Mansun; MO Records

Jowall (Korean: 조월) is a South Korean post-rock musician. He is known as a member of the shoegaze band Underwear Band and electronica group Byul.org. He began his career as a solo musician since in 2009 and released three studio albums: Things You Are Going to See Here (네가이곳에서보게될것들) (2009), Clean & Clear (깨끗하게, 맑게,) (2013) and To Celebrate Nothing (아무것도 기념하지 않는) (2020).

== Career ==
Jowall was a member of the shoegaze band Underwear Band, which was formed in 2000. He have also formed the electronica band Byul.org since 2001 with his brother Jo Taesang. He also led the band's magazine Monthly Vampire (월간 뱀파이어).

He began his solo career in 2009 and released his first album, Things You Are Going to See Here (네가이곳에서보게될것들). He released his second studio album, Clean & Clear (깨끗하게, 맑게,) in 2013. Na Wonyoung of Weiv described the album as "Rough or low-fi noise was refined more neatly, but all these sounds were located in the right place to create a clear composition narrative, which captured lyricism very beautifully."

In 2015, he released a collaboration album Mirror and Corpse (거울과 시체) with Choi Taehyeon, member of rock band Kuang Program. In 2019, he released the songs Ora and Fra under the name of Kim Mak, and that summer they released the single Retreat / Arbor Day (퇴로 / 식목일) under the name of Jowall.

In 2020 he released a new studio album, To Celebrate Nothing (아무것도 기념하지 않는). In 2023, he released a new single, "Seol-i (설이)," with Cadejo guitarist Lee Taehoon participating in the recording.

== Discography ==
=== Studio albums ===
- Things You Are Going to See Here (네가이곳에서보게될것들) (2009)
- Clean & Clear (깨끗하게, 맑게,) (2013)
- Mirror and Corpse (거울과 시체) (2015) (with Choi Taehyeon)
- To Celebrate Nothing (아무것도 기념하지 않는) (2020)
