= Second Language (album) =

Studio album by XXX
- Released: February 15, 2019
- Genre: Industrial hip hop
- Length: 34:32
- Language: Korean; English
- Label: Beasts And Natives Alike (BANA)
- Producer: FRNK

XXX chronology
Language (2018)	Second Language (2019)

Second Language is the second studio album by South Korean hip hop duo XXX. The album was released on 15 February 2019 through Beasts And Natives Alike.

== Background ==
After the huge success of their first studio album Language, XXX recorded their next album, and the cover art was released on Beasts And Natives Alike's official website on 31 January 2019. They also had an exhibition of the same name produced with designer Lee Kwangho.

== Critical reception ==
Professional ratings
Review scores
Source	Rating
IZM	3.5/5 stars
Pitchfork	7.5/10
Rhythmer	3.5/5 stars

Kim Doheon of IZM reviewed "The second utterance of the flexible XXX shows that they also harboured a glimmer of hope in pessimism." Joshua Minsoo Kim of Pitchfork described the album as "They find a catch, powerful zone to serve up the invisible."

== Track listing ==
All lyrics written by Kim Ximya; all tracks produced by Frnk.

No.	Title	Length
1.	"Intro (무뢰배)"	2:40
2.	"We Are (우린)"	3:14
3.	"Ooh Ah (우아)"	3:35
4.	"Bougie"	3:03
5.	"FAD"	2:41
6.	"Scale Model"	3:46
7.	"Language"	4:34
8.	"Fine (괜찮아)"	3:04
9.	"Done (다했어)"	3:40
10.	"Desk Job (사무직)"	4:15
Total length:		34:32
