= Language (XXX album) =

Studio album by XXX
- Released: November 28, 2018
- Genre: Experimental hip hop, IDM
- Length: 39:48
- Language: Korean
- Label: Beasts And Natives Alike (BANA)
- Producer: FRNK

XXX chronology
Kyomi (2016)	Language (2018)	Second Language (2019)

Singles from Language
- 1. "What You Want (뭐 어쩔까 그럼)" Released: February 7, 2018; 2. "Just Like" Released: October 16, 2018; 3. "Sujak (수작)" Released: November 15, 2018

Language is the debut studio album by South Korean hip hop duo XXX. It was released on November 28, 2018, by Beasts And Natives Alike.

== Background ==
XXX began to gain popularity through EP Kyomi in 2016 after their formation. The album's artwork represents the removal of lipstick and letters from their previous ep Kyomi. The group interviewed that 18G 1517 (18거 1517) was a track that penetrated the theme of the album, and they described that it was a track that represented the mindset that they had from the beginning of the group and the current mindset.

== Critical reception ==
Professional ratings
Review scores
Source	Rating
IZM	4.5/5 stars
Pitchfork	7.3/10
Rhythmer	3.5/5 stars

Kim Doheon of IZM reviewed "Language grabs the hair and pours toxic questions in front of his face, asking him to confront the contradictory system and the collective consciousness of oblivion that condones it." Joshua Minsoo Kim of Pitchfork described the album as an antidote to mainstream South Korean rap and pop—personal, anti-capitalist screeds over experimental trap and techno hybrids. Lee Jinseok of Rhythmer described the album as a work that both Kim Ximya and Frnk took to the next level.

== Track listing ==
All lyrics written by Kim Ximya; all tracks produced by Frnk.

No.	Title	Length
1.	"18G 1517 (18거 1517)"	4:54
2.	"Ugly"	3:53
3.	"Sujak (수작)"	3:48
4.	"Ganju Gok (간주곡)"	6:38
5.	"Trust Us"	2:49
6.	"S_it"	5:17
7.	"What You Want"	3:29
8.	"Arranged"	3:21
9.	"Bad For You"	3:04
10.	"Told You"	3:35
Total length:		39:48

Limited edition bonus track
No.	Title	Length
11.	"Just Like"	3:25
12.	"Noise"
