= 250 (musician) =

South Korean electronic musician (born 1982)

- Born: Lee Hohyeong; April 11, 1982 (age 44)
- Origin: South Korea
- Genres: Electronic dance music, ppongjjak disco
- Years active: 2011–present
- Label: Beasts And Natives Alike

Lee Ho-hyeong (Korean: 이호형; born April 11, 1982), better known by his stage name 250, is a South Korean electronic musician. He has released two albums: One Night Stand (2014) and Ppong (2022).

== Career ==
250 is a DJ who has been active in Itaewon for a long time. He released the single "다시 부르기" in 2013, and his first studio album One Night Stand was released in 2014. He first announced the release of his second album Ppong in 2016, but it took six years before it was released. As a producer, he has worked with E Sens, Kim Ximya, BTS, NCT 127, Itzy and NewJeans.

His second studio album, Ppong, was released on March 18, 2022. He received critical acclaim for his reinterpretation of trot and ppongjjak, the genres that were regarded as old-fashioned in South Korea. Along with the album's release, he released the documentary Finding Ppong (뽕을 찾아서), which featured cameos from Han Sangcheol of Bulssazo, saxophonist Lee Jeongsik and keyboardist Kim Sooil. He won four awards at the 2023 Korean Music Awards: Album of the Year, Artist of the Year, Electronic Album of the Year, and Electronic Song of the Year.

250 has produced "Attention", "Hype Boy", "Hurt", "Ditto", "ETA", "Get Up", "ASAP", "How Sweet", "Bubble Gum" and "Supernatural" for the K-pop group NewJeans. He remixed several tracks originally from NewJeans's EP New Jeans and single album OMG for their first remix album NJWMX, released in December 2023.

== Discography ==
=== Studio albums ===
Title	Album details	Peak chart positions
Title	Album details	KOR
One Night Stand	Released: 2014; Label: Beasts And Natives Alike	—
Ppong (뽕)	Released: March 18, 2022; Label: Beasts And Natives Alike	53

== Awards and nominations ==
List of awards and nominations received by 250
Award ceremony	Year	Category	Nominee / Work	Result	Ref.
Circle Chart Music Awards	2024	Composer of the Year	250	Won	
Korean Hip-hop Awards	2022	Music Video of the Year	"Bang Bus"	Nominated	
Korean Hip-hop Awards	2023	Producer of the Year	250	Won	
Korean Music Awards	2023	Musician of the Year (Grand Prize)	250	Won	
Korean Music Awards	2023	Album of the Year (Grand Prize)	Ppong	Won	
Korean Music Awards	2023	Best Dance & Electronic Album	Ppong	Won	
Korean Music Awards	2023	Best Dance & Electronic Song	"Bang Bus"	Won	
