= The Anecdote =

Studio album by E Sens
- Released: August 27, 2015
- Genre: Hip hop
- Length: 38:38
- Language: Korean
- Label: Beasts And Natives Alike (BANA)
- Producer: Daniel "Obi" Klein

E Sens chronology
| The Anecdote (2015) | The Stranger (2019) |

Singles from The Anecdote
- 1. "Back In Time" Released: September 30, 2014

The Anecdote is the debut studio album by South Korean rapper E Sens. It was released on August 27, 2015, by Beasts And Natives Alike.

== Background ==
The album's first single, "Back In Time", was released September 30, 2014. The album was scheduled to be released in November 2014, but it was delayed because he was arrested for marijuana use, in November.

After his release from prison, he was arrested again in 2015 on marijuana charges. But the album was not delayed due to the label's request, the album was released in August 2015 while he was in prison. The album was a success, garnering unprecedented pre-sale orders and winning both Album of the Year and Best Rap & Hip Hop Album at the 2016 Korean Music Awards.

== Critical reception ==
Professional ratings
Review scores
| Source | Rating |
|---|---|
| IZM | 4/5 stars |
| Music Y | 4/5 stars |
| Rhythmer | 4.5/5 stars |

Kim Doheon of IZM reviewed "E Sens fought against himself, the greatest enemy of him, writing fierce results that he could be satisfied with, and the result of his immersion is The Anecdote." Nam Seonghoon of Rhythmer reviewed, "After the end of The Anecdote, the musical achievements revealed there have a strange experience of being the last piece of the various inspirations that he scattered in the lyrics."

== Track listing ==
All tracks written by E Sens and produced by Daniel "Obi" Klein, except for track 9 "Tick Tock" written by E Sens and Kim Ximya.

| No. | Title | Length |
|---|---|---|
| 1. | "Dice (주사위)" | 3:36 |
| 2. | "A-G-E" | 3:25 |
| 3. | "Writer's Block" | 3:38 |
| 4. | "Next Level" | 3:33 |
| 5. | "Wobble (삐끗)" | 4:27 |
| 6. | "10.18.14" | 1:23 |
| 7. | "The Anecdote" | 4:21 |
| 8. | "Back In Time" | 3:33 |
| 9. | "Tick Tock" (featuring Kim Ximya) | 5:12 |
| 10. | "Unknown Verses" | 5:30 |
| Total length: | | 38:38 |

== Charts ==
| Chart (2015) | Peak position |
|---|---|
| South Korean Albums (Gaon) | 2 |
