= You or Me =

You or Me may refer to:

- You or Me (Jimmy Heath album), 1995
- You or Me (Kuang Program album), 2013
