= Not My Fault =

Studio album by Dress and Sogumm
- Released: September 27, 2019
- Genre: Hip hop; R&B; electronica
- Length: 46:43
- Label: Highline

Not My Fault is a collaborative studio album by South Korean music producer Dress and singer-songwriter Sogumm. It was released on September 27, 2019, through Highline Entertainment. It was later nominated for Best R&B Album at the Korean Music Awards and peaked at number 65 on the Gaon Album Chart.

== Background ==
In an interview with Genie Music, Sogumm explained how the album was made.

Dress also made commercial music but wanted to express his feelings through beats without thinking too much. I worked with him because he requested a collaboration first, but I wrote songs quickly and he kept sending me beats. So we were planning to release one or two songs at first but made so many songs in an instant. The general public may find our music difficult but we were not asking for their understanding, so we named the album Not My Fault and decided on the album concept.

== Music and lyrics ==
Sogumm's vocals that pronounce words differently are sometimes innocent("I Wonder", "Honey Bee", "Pretty Bitch"), dry("Sorry", "Once Again"), or magical("Diary", "Dreamer, Doer"). Meanwhile, Dress' production encompasses hip hop, R&B, and electronica.

"Diary" is reminiscent of 90's trip hop sounds like those of Morcheeba. It tells the direction of the album with a down-tempo beat played with an analog drum set and piano, string, and guitar sounds distorted by an effects unit. "Sorry" emphasizes electronic sounds while "Pretty Bitch" solely features acoustic guitar sounds.

== Critical reception ==
Kang Il-gwon of Rhythmer rated the album 4 out of 5 stars and claimed that it was "electrifying, excellent, and fresh". On the other hand, he suggested that Sogumm write more lyrics in Korean.

Critics of Music Y rated "I Wonder" 3.5 out of 5 stars. According to Jeong Byeong-uk, Dress "knows how to use minimal sources in the right place and bring out the maximum amount of dreamlike atmosphere and groove." Also, Sogumm "pronounces lyrics uniquely while reducing the resonance of the sound and shows her individuality with unconventional breathing and accents." Meanwhile, Jay Park balances out the intenseness of the hook by singing sweet lyrics in a natural style.

=== Year-end lists ===
Publication	List	Rank	Ref.
Rhythmer	10 Best Korean R&B Albums of 2019	5	

== Awards and nominations ==
Award	Year	Category	Result	Ref.
Korean Music Awards	2020	Best R&B Album	Nominated	
Korean Hip-hop Awards	2020	R&B Album of the Year	Nominated	

== Track listing ==
All lyrics are written by Sogumm; all music is composed by Dress, Sogumm.

No.	Title	Lyrics	Music	Length
1.	"Diary" (일기) (featuring Punchnello)	Punchnello		3:38
2.	"Dreamer, Doer"			2:56
3.	"I Wonder" (궁금해) (featuring Jay Park)	Jay Park	Jay Park	3:34
4.	"Once Again" (다시한번) (featuring Che)	Che	Che, Ryo	3:36
5.	"Honey Bee" (featuring Penomeco)	Penomeco	Ryo, Penomeco	2:28
6.	"Moonlight" (featuring Che & Mokyo)	Mokyo	Mokyo	3:46
7.	"Don't Ask" (물어보지마) (featuring Woo Won-jae & Jane)	Jeanjinn Jane, Woo Won-jae	Ryo, Jeanjinn Jane, Woo Won-jae	3:48
8.	"It Was"	Kentaro Okawara		2:06
9.	"However" (featuring Kim Ximya & Seo Hyeon-su)	Kentaro Okawara, Kim Ximya	Kim Ximya	3:53
10.	"Frog" (featuring Omega Sapien)	Omega Sapien	Midnight	3:52
11.	"Sorry" (미안해) (featuring No2zcat)		No2zcat	2:55
12.	"Dear" (featuring Mokyo)	Mokyo	Ryo	3:56
13.	"Pretty Bitch"		Ryo	3:13
14.	"Dreamer, Doer (Instrumental)"			2:56
Total length:				46:43

== Charts ==
Chart (2019)	Peak position
South Korean Albums (Gaon)	65
