= List of number-one songs of 2023 (Singapore) =

This is a list of the Singapore Top 30 Digital Streaming number-one songs in 2023, according to the Recording Industry Association of Singapore.

== Chart history ==
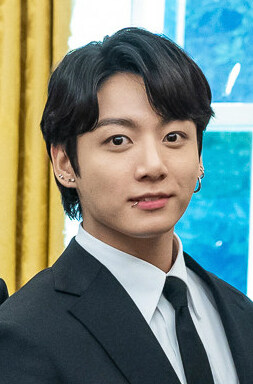
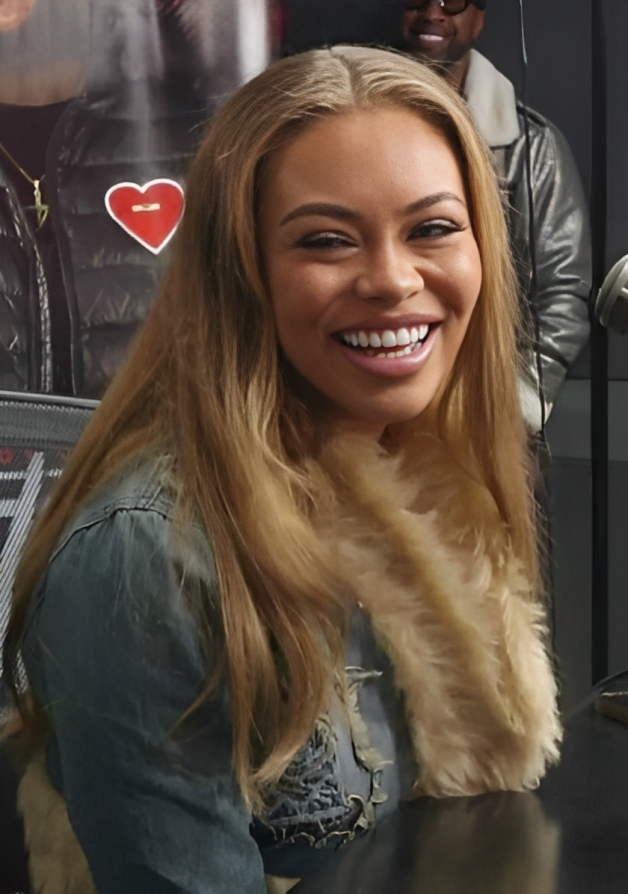
Jungkook and Latto topped the chart for 17 weeks in 2023 with "Seven". Jungkook also topped the chart for another week with "3D".

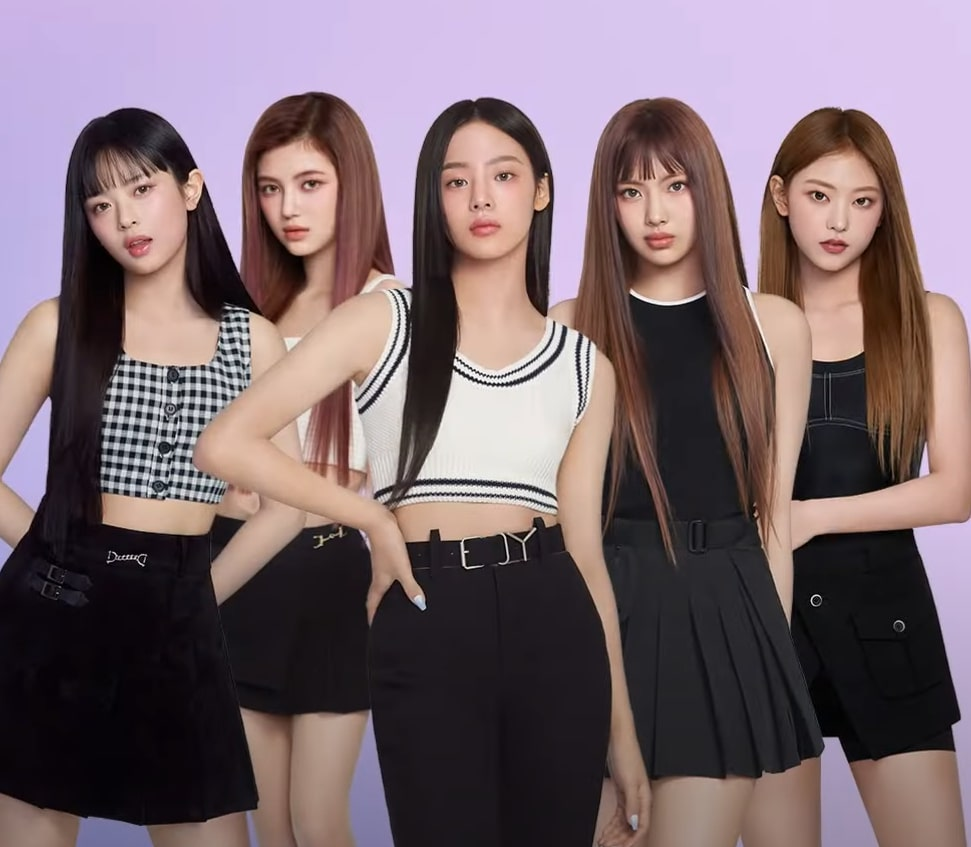
NewJeans earned the most number-one songs by any artist in 2023, topping the chart for 7 weeks with "Ditto", "OMG", and "Super Shy".

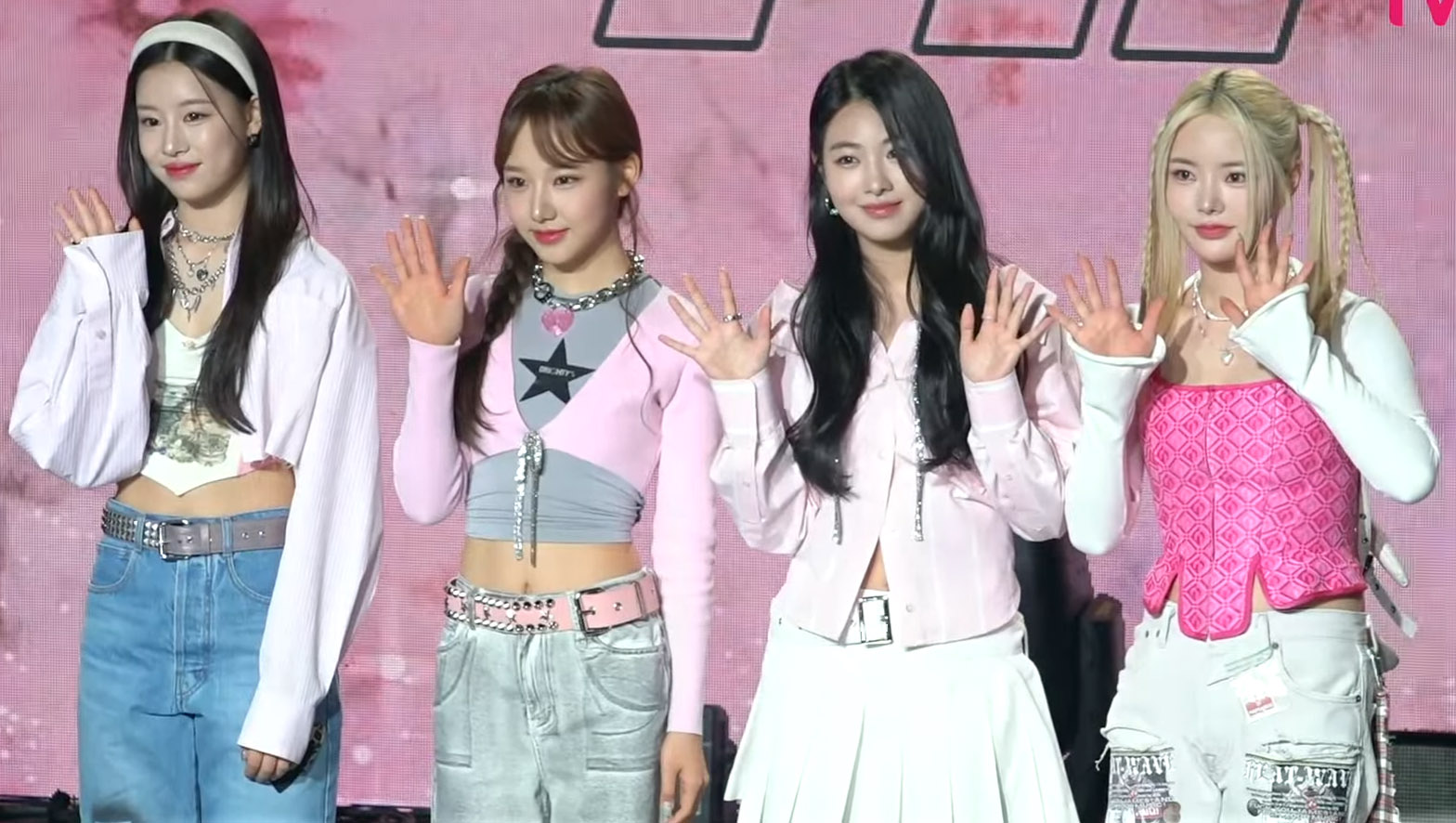
Fifty Fifty topped the chart for 14 weeks with "Cupid".

Issue Date	Song	Artist(s)	Ref.
5 January	"Ditto"	NewJeans	
12 January	"Ditto"	NewJeans	
19 January	"Kill Bill"	SZA	
26 January	"Flowers"	Miley Cyrus	
2 February	"OMG"	NewJeans	
9 February	"OMG"	NewJeans	
16 February	"OMG"	NewJeans	
23 February	"OMG"	NewJeans	
2 March	"Die for You (Remix)"	The Weeknd and Ariana Grande	
9 March	"Die for You"	The Weeknd	
16 March	"Die for You"	The Weeknd	
23 March	"Cupid"	Fifty Fifty	
30 March	"Cupid"	Fifty Fifty	
6 April	"Flower"	Jisoo	
13 April	"Cupid"	Fifty Fifty	
20 April	"Cupid"	Fifty Fifty	
27 April	"Cupid"	Fifty Fifty	
4 May	"Cupid"	Fifty Fifty	
11 May	"Cupid"	Fifty Fifty	
18 May	"Cupid"	Fifty Fifty	
25 May	"Cupid"	Fifty Fifty	
1 June	"Cupid"	Fifty Fifty	
8 June	"Cupid"	Fifty Fifty	
15 June	"Cupid"	Fifty Fifty	
22 June	"Cupid"	Fifty Fifty	
29 June	"Cupid"	Fifty Fifty	
6 July	"Cruel Summer"	Taylor Swift	
13 July	"Super Shy"	NewJeans	
20 July	"Seven"	Jungkook featuring Latto	
27 July	"Seven"	Jungkook featuring Latto	
3 August	"Seven"	Jungkook featuring Latto	
10 August	"Seven"	Jungkook featuring Latto	
17 August	"Seven"	Jungkook featuring Latto	
24 August	"Seven"	Jungkook featuring Latto	
31 August	"Seven"	Jungkook featuring Latto	
7 September	"Seven"	Jungkook featuring Latto	
14 September	"Seven"	Jungkook featuring Latto	
21 September	"Seven"	Jungkook featuring Latto	
28 September	"Seven"	Jungkook featuring Latto	
5 October	"3D"	Jungkook featuring Jack Harlow	
12 October	"You & Me"	Jennie	
19 October	"Seven"	Jungkook featuring Latto	
26 October	"Seven"	Jungkook featuring Latto	
2 November	"Seven"	Jungkook featuring Latto	
9 November	"Seven"	Jungkook featuring Latto	
16 November	"Perfect Night"	Le Sserafim	
23 November	"Seven"	Jungkook featuring Latto	
30 November	"Perfect Night"	Le Sserafim	
7 December	"Seven"	Jungkook featuring Latto	
14 December	"Greedy"	Tate McRae	
21 December	"Greedy"	Tate McRae	
28 December	"All I Want for Christmas Is You"	Mariah Carey	

== Number-one artists ==
List of number-one artists by total weeks at number one
Position	Artist	Weeks at No. 1
1	Jungkook	18
2	Latto	17
3	Fifty Fifty	14
4	NewJeans	7
5	The Weeknd	3
6	Le Sserafim	2
6	Tate McRae	2
7	SZA	1
7	Miley Cyrus	1
7	Ariana Grande	1
7	Jisoo	1
7	Taylor Swift	1
7	Jennie	1
7	Jack Harlow	1
7	Mariah Carey	1
