= Precious (Sogumm album) =

Studio album by Sogumm
- Released: October 22, 2021
- Genre: R&B, alternative R&B, soft pop
- Length: 28:03
- Label: AOMG

Sogumm chronology
Sobrightttttttt (2019)	Precious (2021)

Precious is the second studio album of South Korean singer-songwriter Sogumm. It was released on October 22, 2021, through AOMG. It was later nominated for Best R&B Album at the Korean Music Awards.

== Background ==
In an interview with Bandwagon Asia, Sogumm spoke on the album's creative direction.

I focused on popularity for the music, and artistry for the visuals. I thought the gap between music and visuals would express the confusion that I'm going through, and such imbalance has impacted not only my music but also my relationship with people. I thought it's important to explain and express what I want.

== Release ==
On October 18, 2021, AOMG revealed an image of an unknown figure between trees marked with a red circle through its social media. On the next day, it released a "card news" article that called the figure in the picture "Jangchung-dong white cloth". On October 20, it revealed the album cover and preview video.

== Music and lyrics ==
The album starts with the mellow "Precious" and builds up to the "heady" dance-hip-hop mix "My Time Is Gold". The fuzz guitar riff of "Complex" quickly changes the mood of the track and creates tension. Lyrically, Sogumm is straightforward with her lover without thinking too much. She talks about saying goodbye to her loved ones on "So Soon" and sings about jealousy and love on a trap beat on "My Love".

== Critical reception ==
Therese Reyes of Vice wrote that the album is "well thought out but still folky and freeform, like it came from a pure desire to depict deep emotions through sound." Jo Ji-hwan of Tonplein commented that Sogumm succeeded in making unique and fun songs. Rhythmer wrote that she created familiar yet new R&B music by properly combining Sobrightttttttt's avant-garde sound with public appeal.

=== Year-end lists ===
Publication	List	Rank	Ref.
Rhythmer	10 Best Korean R&B Albums of 2021	2	

== Awards and nominations ==
Award	Year	Category	Result	Ref.
Korean Music Awards	2022	Best R&B Album	Nominated	

== Track listing ==
All lyrics are written by Sogumm; all music is composed by Sogumm, Glowingdog.

No.	Title	Lyrics	Music	Length
1.	"Precious"			2:26
2.	"Complex" (컴플렉스)			3:23
3.	"Prescription" (처방전)			3:26
4.	"Do I Have Your Love?"			3:46
5.	"Fairytale"			3:20
6.	"The Person from Yesterday" (어제 그 사람)			3:29
7.	"So Soon" (아니 벌써)			3:06
8.	"My Love" (내 사랑)			2:22
9.	"My Time Is Gold" (featuring Omega Sapien)	Omega Sapien	Omega Sapien	2:40
Total length:				28:03
