= Secret Stories Heard From a Girl in an Opium Den =

Studio album by Byul.org
- Released: 15 November 2011
- Genre: Electronica
- Length: 65:23
- Label: Burnt Toast Vinyl
- Producer: Byul.org

Byul.org chronology
Secret Stories Heard From a Girl in an Opium Den (2011)	Selected Tracks for Nacht Dämonen (2017)

Secret Stories Heard From a Girl in an Opium Den (Korean: 아편굴 처녀가 들려준 이야기) is the debut studio album by South Korean electronica band Byul.org. The album was released on 15 November 2011 through Burnt Toast Vinyl.

== Background ==
Byul.org was formed in 2000 and became popular with the release of the EP series Monthly Vampire (월간 뱀파이어), but did not provide streaming and download services on its official music site. The first studio album began in 2005 at the suggestion of Burnt Toast Vinyl and was recorded for five years. Byul.org collaborated with film director Nam Goongsun to produce a short film of the same name.

== Critical reception ==
Music webzine Tonplein named it the 18th best album of the 2010s and said "At the end of the 2010s, Secret Stories Heard From a Girl in an Opium Den will be an album that can remain as a nostalgia for the sentimental emotions of the past." Hwang Inho of IZM described the album's track Bleu Bulb Light (푸른전구빛) as "It is a song that instantly melts the indifference to the texture of sound and makes me think about the musical worldview."

== Track listing ==
No.	Title	Length
1.	"2"	5:28
2.	"Bleu Bulb Light" ("푸른전구빛")	5:34
3.	"Biidankil" ("비단길")	6:30
4.	"Pacific" ("태평양")	3:31
5.	"6"	3:01
6.	"Secret Police" ("비밀경찰")	4:19
7.	"Bug Dance" ("벌레춤")	4:37
8.	"A Beach" ("해운대")	2:55
9.	"Universe Factory" ("세계의 공장")	7:06
10.	"Blue Marble" ("부루마블")	5:15
11.	"Dool" ("둘")	1:56
12.	"Beer From Holland" ("진정한 후렌치후라이의 시대는 갔는가")	5:16
13.	"Opium Den" ("아편굴 처녀가 들려준 이야기")	6:10
14.	"Idiots" ("멍청이들")	3:45
