= Sogumm =

South Korean musician (born 1994)

Sogumm 소금
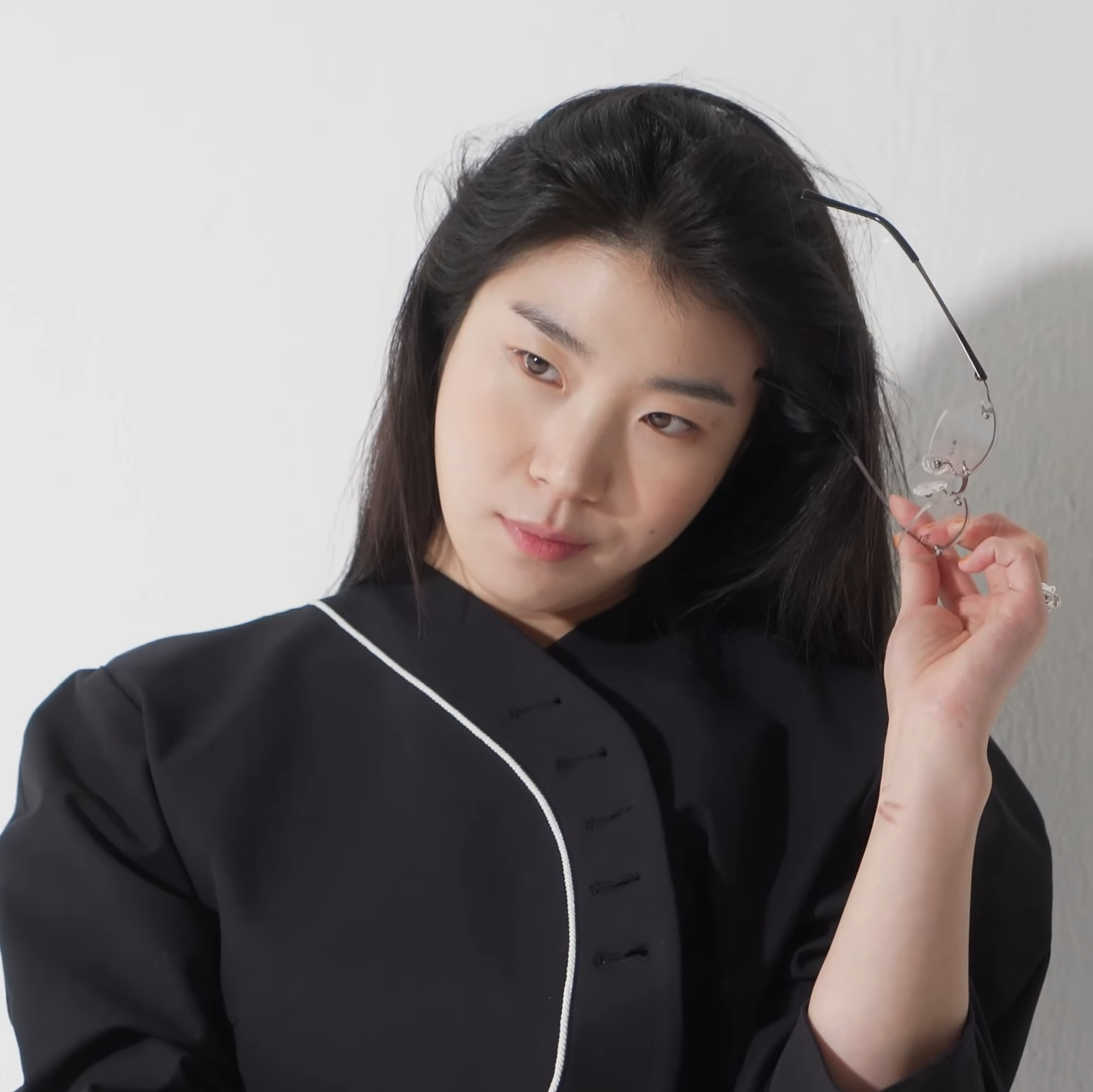

Background information
- Born: Kwon So-hee; March 8, 1994 (age 32); Daejeon, South Korea
- Genres: R&B
- Occupation: Singer-songwriter
- Years active: 2018–present
- Member of: Balming Tiger

Korean name
- Hangul: 권소희
- RR: Gwon Sohui
- MR: Kwŏn Sohŭi

Kwon So-hee (Korean: 권소희; born March 8, 1994), known professionally as Sogumm (Korean: 소금; stylized in all lowercase), is a South Korean singer-songwriter. In 2019, she released albums Not My Fault and Sobrightttttttt, which were met with critical acclaim. She won Signhere and signed to AOMG in the same year. She won Rookie of the Year at the Korean Music Awards in 2020 and released her second studio album Precious in 2021. In 2022 Sogumm released her single titled "Salt Rain" in collaboration with Keumbee and produced by Alfie Hole. The Single consists of three tracks, "Kissing", "Salt Rain" and one of the biggest MPB (Brazilian Popular Music) songs composed by Tom Jobim & Elis Regina "Waters of March".

== Early life ==
Kwon So-hee was born on March 8, 1994, in Daejeon. As she lived in China when she was in the fifth grade, she listened to songs by foreign artists. She became interested in music after discovering Michael Jackson. She started making music in high school, but only began to compose songs from the heart after moving to Seoul when she was 23. She worked for an OST-making company but quit her job in 2017 because she could not write the music she wanted to make. She began uploading her music to SoundCloud and later joined Balming Tiger.

She adopted the stage name "Sogumm" because it was her nickname in middle school.

== Career ==
In 2018, Sogumm released her debut single "Suicide" with rapper Tnom. In September 2019, she released collaborative album Not My Fault with music producer Dress. In October 2019, she released her debut studio album Sobrightttttttt. Both albums received critical acclaim. In November 2019, Sogumm won Signhere and signed to AOMG. In 2020, she won Rookie of Year at the Korean Music Awards. In 2021, she released her second studio album Precious which received critical acclaim. In 2023, she departed from AOMG as her contract expired. She is currently a member of the alternative K-pop band Balming Tiger.

== Artistry ==
Sogumm is known for her unique singing style. The Hankyoreh wrote that "she recites verses in a relaxed tone similar to that of "singing rap". She also pronounces words unclearly and goes offbeat, which gives the impression that she is drunk or sleepy." Lyrically, Bandwagon praised her "straightforward and vivid storytelling."

Sogumm describes her music as "deficiency" because she expresses the feelings from the deficiency of life and implies her belief of trying to grow through deficiency in her music. In terms of genre, she describes it as alternative pop. She was influenced by female R&B singers such as Beyoncé and Alicia Keys. She usually gets inspiration from her daily life, love, and nature.

== Discography ==
=== Studio albums ===
Title	Details
Sobrightttttttt	Released: October 21, 2019; Label: Balming Tiger; Format: Digital download
Precious	Released: October 22, 2021; Label: AOMG; Format: CD, digital download

=== Collaborative album ===
Title	Details	Peak chart position
Title	Details	KOR
Not My Fault (with Dress)	Released: September 27, 2019; Label: Highline Entertainment; Format: CD, Digital download	65

=== Singles ===
Title	Year	Album
"Suicide" (with Tnom)	2018	Non-album singles
"Trust Me Remix" (사랑해줘 Remix) (with Yumdda)	2019	Non-album singles
"Meet Me When This Rain Stops" (이 비가 그치면 만나) (with DJ Wegun featuring Hoody)	2019	Non-album singles
"Big Dream" (큰 꿈) (featuring pH-1)	2019	Signhere
"What Should I Do" (어쩌나) (featuring Jjangyou)	2019	Signhere
"Letter" (편지) (featuring Simon Dominic)	2019	Signhere
"My Taste" (내 입맛) (with Dress featuring Zico)	2020	Non-album singles
"Selfish" (with Jason Lee, Nitti Gritti, Kaku)	2020	Non-album singles
"Yayouhoi" (야유회) (with Oh Hyuk)	2020	Non-album singles
"Run"	2020	My Dangerous Wife
"Encourage" (위로) (featuring 10cm)	2020	Non-album singles
"Imagine" (with DJ Wegun featuring Hoody)	2021	Non-album singles
"Sorry" (with Dress featuring No2zcat)	2021	Non-album singles
"Baennorae" (뱃노래)	2021	Feel the Rhythm of Korea
"Cheers" (치열) (with Code Kunst, Lee Chan-hyuk, Colde)	2021	Non-album singles
"Salt Rain" (소금비) (with Keumbee)	2022	Non-album singles
"I Love You" (사랑해) (featuring Silica Gel)	2023	Non-album singles

== Filmography ==
=== Television ===
Year	Title	Role	Note	Ref.
2019	Signhere	Contestant	Winner	

== Awards and nominations ==
Award	Year	Nominee	Category	Result	Ref.
Korean Music Awards	2020	Herself	Rookie of the Year	Won	
Korean Music Awards	2020	Not My Fault	Best R&B Album	Nominated	
Korean Music Awards	2020	Sobrightttttttt	Best R&B Album	Nominated	
Korean Music Awards	2022	Precious	Best R&B Album	Nominated	
Korean Hip-hop Awards	2020	Herself	New Artist of the Year	Nominated	
Korean Hip-hop Awards	2020	Not My Fault	R&B Album of the Year	Nominated	
Korean Hip-hop Awards	2020	Sobrightttttttt	R&B Album of the Year	Nominated	
Korean Hip-hop Awards	2020	"I Wonder"	R&B Track of the Year	Nominated	
