= OMG (single album) =

2023 single album by NewJeans

- Digital cover

Single album by NewJeans
- Released: January 2, 2023
- Recorded: 2022
- Studios: Hybe Studio (Yongsan, Seoul)
- Genre: Pop
- Length: 6:37
- Language: Korean
- Label: ADOR
- Producers: 250; Park Jin-su

NewJeans chronology
New Jeans (2022)	OMG (2023)	Get Up (2023)

Singles from OMG
- 1. "Ditto" Released: December 19, 2022; 2. "OMG" Released: January 2, 2023

Professional ratings
Review scores
Source	Rating
NME	4/5 stars

OMG is the first single album by South Korean girl group NewJeans. It was released on January 2, 2023, by ADOR. It contains the lead single of the same name and "Ditto", which was released prior to the single album on December 19, 2022.

== Background ==
NewJeans released their first extended play New Jeans on August 1, 2022, which had a strong presence on charts globally and was met with commercial and critical success. In November 2022, Hybe Corporation, the parent company of ADOR, which is managed by Min Hee-jin, confirmed in an online briefing about the future of the company that the quintet would release a new single album in January.

== Release and promotion ==
On November 10, during Hybe Corporation's annual community briefing on YouTube, CEO Jiwon Park announced that NewJeans' are slated to return with the release of their first single album OMG on January 2, 2023. On the same day, it was revealed that the single album will consist of the title track that was already planned at the time of production for the group's debut album New Jeans as well as a pre-release single which will be released on December 19. On December 12, the first teasers were released, which were inspired by '90s Christmas visuals. Both teasers show a rabbit hopping in the middle of the logo, meant to symbolize the group's fanbase, known as "bunnies". On the same day, the name of the pre-release track which was revealed to be "Ditto" was released.

== Composition ==
The single album contains two tracks, including the eponymous lead single and "Ditto". In a brief statement to South Korean media outlets, ADOR CEO Min Hee-jin said, "If the debut album showcased NewJeans' summer, this single album will be one that showcases NewJeans' winter."

== Track listing ==
Track listing for OMG
No.	Title	Lyrics	Music	Arrangement	Length
1.	"OMG"	Gigi; Ylva Dimberg; Hanni	Park Jin-su; Ylva Dimberg; David Dawood	Park Jin-su	3:32
2.	"Ditto"	Ylva Dimberg; The Black Skirts; Oohyo; Minji	250; Ylva Dimberg	250	3:06
Total length:					6:38

== Charts ==
=== Weekly charts ===
Weekly chart performance for OMG
Chart (2023)	Peak position
Belgian Albums (Ultratop Flanders)	69
Belgian Albums (Ultratop Wallonia)	173
Croatian International Albums (HDU)	13
Japan (Oricon)	2
Japan Combined Singles (Oricon)	1
Japan Top Singles Sales (Billboard Japan)	2
Portuguese Albums (AFP)	8
South Korean Albums (Circle)	1

=== Monthly charts ===
Monthly chart performance for OMG
Chart (2023)	Peak position
Japan (Oricon)	11
South Korean Albums (Circle)	2

=== Year-end charts ===
Year-end chart performance for OMG
Chart (2023)	Position
Japan Combined Singles (Oricon)	3
South Korean Albums (Circle)	24

== Certifications and sales ==
Certification and sales for OMG
Region	Certification	Certified units/sales
Japan	—	35,418
South Korea (KMCA)	Million	1,365,618
South Korea (KMCA) Weverse album	2× Platinum	500,000^

== Release history ==
Release history for OMG
Region	Date	Format	Label	Ref.
Various	January 2, 2023	Digital download; streaming	ADOR	
South Korea	January 2, 2023	CD	ADOR	
United States	March 10, 2023	CD	ADOR; Geffen	
