= Kim Ximya =

South Korean rapper (born 1995)

- Also known as: AXAX Kuddy
- Born: Kim Donghyeon; 21 July 1995 (age 31)
- Origin: Seoul, South Korea
- Genre: Hip hop
- Years active: 2014–present
- Label: Beasts And Natives Alike

Kim Ximya (Korean: 김심야; RR: Gim Simya; born 21 July 1995) is a South Korean rapper. He is a member of hip hop duo XXX, and he released his first solo studio album, Dog in 2020.

== Career ==
Kim Ximya lived in various countries such as South Korea, China, Australia, and the United States as a child and attended George Washington University. On his debut, he named his stage name AXAX Kuddy, which was influenced by ASAP Rocky. But later changed it to Kim Ximya. He participated as the only featured member on E Sens' studio album The Anecdote.

In 2017, he released a solo single Interior, and mixtape Moonshine with producer D. Sanders. He formed the music group XXX with producer FRNK, which released two studio albums: Language (2018) and Second Language (2019). He wrote lyrics for rap parts for groups such as Red Velvet and SHINee.

He released his first solo studio album Dog in 2020, and he has since joined the military. After being discharged from the military, he released his single Friends Go Foe in 2023. He produced a music for the fashion brand Kusikohc.

== Discography ==
=== Solo releases ===
==== Studio albums ====
- Dog (2020)
- Dogma (2026)

==== Mixtapes ====
- Bundle1 (2020)

=== XXX ===
==== Studio albums ====
- Language (2018)
- Second Language (2019)

==== EPs ====
- Kyomi (2016)

=== with D. Sanders ===
==== Mixtapes ====
- Moonshine (2017)
