= Cookie (song) =

Song by NewJeans

from the EP New Jeans
- Language: Korean
- Released: August 1, 2022
- Genre: R&B; pop; Jersey club; hip hop
- Length: 3:55
- Label: ADOR
- Songwriters: Gigi; Ylva Dimberg; Park Jin-su
- Producer: Park Jin-su

NewJeans chronology
"Hype Boy" (2022)	"Cookie" (2022)	"Ditto" (2022)

Music video
- "Cookie" on YouTube

"Cookie" is a song by South Korean girl group NewJeans. It was released as the third single from their debut self-titled extended play by ADOR on August 1, 2022.

== Background and release ==
On July 22, 2022, NewJeans released the music video for their first single "Attention" as a surprise release, without any previous information given about the group. The following day, NewJeans announced they would release their debut self-titled extended play on August 1, 2022. It would contain four tracks, including two additional singles. Five music videos, of which four focused on the individual members, were released for their second single "Hype Boy" on July 23. On August 1, the group released their debut EP, accompanied by the music video for their third and final single, "Cookie".

== Composition ==
"Cookie" was written by Gigi, Ylva Dimberg and Park Jin-su, who also handled the arrangement. The song is a club-oriented R&B and pop track featuring a Jersey club bridge built upon a minimal hip hop beat. "Cookie" was composed in the key of C major with a tempo of 157 beats per minute.

== Reception ==
The best K-pop songs have always transformed their acculturations into a site for stylistic adventurousness, and "Cookie" does so gracefully.

— Joshua Minsoo Kim, Pitchfork (2022)

Joshua Minsoo Kim of Pitchfork regarded "Cookie" as the "most interesting selection" from the EP, calling "a weightless groove about courting a crush". Writing for The New York Times, Jon Caramanica placed the song at number 11 on his list of the 22 best songs of 2022, praising "its ease—no maximalism, no theater". He pointed out the way NewJeans "deploys its contemporary reference points in service of a throwback idea" through the employment of New Jersey club music on "Cookie". Han Seong-hyun of IZM defined the song as a "small experiment for the next step and commented positively on the "odd" lyrics and the "kitschy" rhythm.

=== Controversy ===
The song received backlash due to allegations that the lyrics contained sexual innuendos which many considered inappropriate for a group composed of teenagers. At the time of release, all members of the group were considered minors under South Korean law. In a review for NME, Carmen Chin noted the "lyrical innuendo that can only be described as concerning when delivered by a group of 14 to 18 year olds – some examples that listeners have flagged as distasteful are "Looking at my cookie / Do you ever smell it different? (Taste it) / What's with a bite isn't enough?" and "Made a little cookie / Come and take a lookie / Only at my house, come over and play'". In particular, the word "cookie" has been highlighted as a slang term referring to the female genitalia. NewJeans' agency ADOR denied the allegations, claiming that the song was "intended for fans" and does not contain a sexual meaning. According to ADOR, they consulted "numerous doctors in English literature, interpreters and native speakers" who agreed that "cookie is not widely used sexual slang". The agency concluded that "the term itself cannot be a problem, although its interpretations can differ".

== Chart performance ==
In South Korea, "Cookie" debuted at number 14 on the Circle Digital Chart in the issue dated July 31–August 6, 2022, and peaked at number nine on the chart in the issue dated September 11–17, 2022. The song peaked at number nine on the Billboard Japan Heatseekers chart in the issue dated October 5, 2022. In Singapore, it peaked at number 15 on the RIAS Top Regional Chart in the issue dated February 3–9, 2023. "Cookie" peaked at number 21 on the Vietnam Hot 100 in the chart issue dated August 18, 2022. The song peaked at number 198 on the Billboard Global Excl. U.S. in the chart issue dated August 27, 2022.

== Promotion ==
The group performed "Cookie" for the first time on the South Korean music show M Countdown on August 4. NewJeans performed the song alongside their previous singles at the 2022 Melon Music Awards on November 26 and at the 2022 MAMA Awards on November 30.

== Charts ==
=== Weekly charts ===
Weekly chart performance
Chart (2022–2023)	Peak position
Global Excl. U.S. (Billboard)	198
Japan Heatseekers (Billboard Japan)	9
Singapore Regional (RIAS)	15
South Korea (Billboard)	6
South Korea (Circle)	9
Vietnam (Vietnam Hot 100)	21

=== Monthly charts ===
Monthly chart performance
Chart (2022)	Peak position
South Korea (Circle)	9

=== Year-end charts ===
2022 year-end chart performance for "Cookie"
Chart (2022)	Position
South Korea (Circle)	80

2023 year-end chart performance for "Cookie"
Chart (2023)	Position
South Korea (Circle)	58

== Certifications ==
Streaming certifications for "Cookie"
Region	Certification	Certified units/sales
Japan (RIAJ)	Gold	50,000,000^{†}
South Korea (KMCA)	Platinum	100,000,000^{†}
^{†} Streaming-only figures based on certification alone.

== Release history ==
Release history
Region	Date	Format	Label	Ref.
Various	August 1, 2022	Digital download; streaming	ADOR	
