= How Sweet =

2024 single by NewJeans

Single by NewJeans

from the album How Sweet
- Language: English; Korean
- B-side: "Bubble Gum"
- Released: May 24, 2024
- Genre: Miami bass; electropop; electroclash
- Length: 3:39
- Label: ADOR
- Composers: 250; Sarah Aarons; Elvira Anderfjärd; Oscar Scheller; Stella Bennett; Tove Burman
- Lyricists: Gigi; Sarah Aarons; Elvira Anderfjärd; Oscar Scheller; Stella Bennett; Tove Burman; Danielle
- Producer: 250

NewJeans singles chronology
"ETA" (2023)	"How Sweet" (2024)	"Supernatural" (2024)

Music video
- "How Sweet" on YouTube

"How Sweet" is a song by the South Korean girl group NewJeans from their second single album of the same name. It was released by ADOR on May 24, 2024, along with the B-side track "Bubble Gum". NewJeans began promoting the single in April 2024, through the release of the music video for "Bubble Gum" on YouTube, featuring the Japanese version of the track in advertisements and television programs in Japan, and appearing on music shows and variety shows in South Korea. The single album debuted at number one in South Korea. It has been described as a Miami bass and electropop song.

== Background and composition ==
NewJeans debuted in 2022 under ADOR, a subsidiary label of Hybe Corporation, and their 2023 EP Get Up was the group's first entry and first number-one on the US Billboard 200. Selling over two million copies, Get Up established NewJeans as one of the most prominent international music acts of the year. Several publications named it among the best music releases of the year. In April 2024, a dispute between Hybe and ADOR's CEO Min Hee-jin over Min's authority within the label became widely publicized. Amid the controversy, NewJeans released their subsequent single, "How Sweet", which had been announced prior.

According to ADOR's press release, "How Sweet" is a Miami bass song. NME wrote that the track "sees NewJeans playing with Miami bass". They continue to reimagine Y2K sounds, transforming them into their own "enchanting spells." Nylon opined that the production "gives off zingy electroclash". Billboard described it as electropop. Lyrically, the group, known for their "witty approach" to relationships, stays true to form with "How Sweet," delivering yet another track focused on self-love.

== Release and promotion ==
On March 27, 2024, ADOR announced that NewJeans would host a fan meeting in Japan and release two double singles in 2024: "How Sweet" and "Bubble Gum" on May 24 and "Supernatural" and "Right Now" on June 21. ADOR stated that NewJeans would be making their debut in the Japanese music market with the release of "Supernatural", their first song in Japanese, while they would focus on promoting "How Sweet" and "Bubble Gum" in South Korea. In conjunction with the singles' announcement, ADOR stated that NewJeans would release an album in the second half of 2024 and embark on a worldwide tour in 2025. The press release caused Hybe Corporation's daily market capitalization to increase by nearly ₩1 trillion. In April 2024, ADOR announced that member Hyein would not participate in promotional activities to recover from an injury.

The CD single became available for pre-order on April 26, 2024, in two physical formats: a vinyl LP-sized version and a Weverse-exclusive version. Additional items available with the CD include a book containing interviews with the members, a photo book, stickers, posters, photo cards, and post cards. In May 2024, NewJeans began making appearances on South Korean music shows, including Music Bank, and variety shows, including 2 Days & 1 Night and Park Myung-soo's web show on YouTube. NewJeans performed at the K-Wave Concert Inkigayo on June 2, 2024. The single album debuted at the number one spot in South Korea.

== Reception ==
Professional ratings
Review scores
Source	Rating
IZM	2.5/5 stars

NME's Tássia Assis, praises the group's continuation of their signature style, blending Y2K influences with fresh elements. Assis suggests that the song feels like a safe, even lukewarm, addition to their discography. While the song is enjoyable and fit well with their previous work, the release lacks the innovation and impact of their past singles like "Hype Boy" or "Ditto." Jeff Benjamin included it in his list of "the 20 best K-pop songs of 2024 so far." He praised the track as a refreshing breakup anthem with a breezy, summery feel, highlighting the group's harmonies and how the song becomes more infectious with each listen. "How Sweet" was featured at number 35 on both Rolling Stone's and The Fader's list of the best songs of 2024.

=== Accolades ===
Music program awards for "How Sweet"
Program	Date	Ref.
Show Champion	May 29, 2024	
Music Bank	May 31, 2024	
Show! Music Core	June 8, 2024	
Show! Music Core	June 15, 2024	
Show! Music Core	June 22, 2024	

== Track listing ==
All tracks are arranged by 250.

"How Sweet" track listing
No.	Title	Lyrics	Music	Length
1.	"How Sweet"	Gigi; Sarah Aarons; Elvira Anderfjärd; Oscar Scheller; Stella Bennett; Tove Burman; Danielle	250; Aarons; Anderfjärd; Scheller; Bennett; Burman	3:39
2.	"Bubble Gum"	Gigi; Oscar Bell; Sophie Simmons	250; Bell; Simmons	3:20
3.	"How Sweet" (Instrumental)		250; Aarons; Anderfjärd; Scheller; Bennett; Burman	3:39
4.	"Bubble Gum" (Instrumental)		250; Bell; Simmons	3:20
Total length:				13:58

== Charts ==
=== Weekly charts ===
Weekly chart performance
Chart (2024)	Peak position
Argentina (Argentina Hot 100)	79
Australia (ARIA)	87
Canada Hot 100 (Billboard)	67
Croatian International Albums (HDU)	9
Global 200 (Billboard)	15
Hong Kong (Billboard)	1
Japan Hot 100 (Billboard)	14
Japan (Oricon)	6
Japan Combined Singles (Oricon)	6
Malaysia (Billboard)	10
Malaysia International (RIM)	7
Netherlands (Global Top 40)	17
New Zealand Hot Singles (RMNZ)	4
Nigerian Albums (TurnTable)	38
Singapore (RIAS)	5
South Korea (Circle)	2
South Korean Albums (Circle)	1
Swedish Physical Albums (Sverigetopplistan)	20
Taiwan (Billboard)	1
UK Singles Downloads (Official Charts)	25
UK Singles Sales (OCC)	27
US Bubbling Under Hot 100 (Billboard)	12
US World Digital Song Sales (Billboard)	4

=== Monthly charts ===
Monthly chart performance
Chart (2024)	Position
Japan (Oricon)	16
South Korea (Circle)	2
South Korean Albums (Circle)	3

=== Year-end charts ===
Year-end chart performance
Chart (2024)	Position
Japan (Oricon)	90
South Korea (Circle)	9
South Korean Albums (Circle)	23

Year-end chart performance
Chart (2025)	Position
South Korea (Circle)	35

== Certifications ==
Certifications for How Sweet
Region	Certification	Certified units/sales
South Korea (KMCA)	Million	1,000,000^{^}
South Korea (KMCA) Weverse Albums version	Platinum	250,000^{^}
Streaming
Japan (RIAJ)	Gold	50,000,000^{†}
South Korea (KMCA)	Platinum	100,000,000^{†}
^{^} Shipments figures based on certification alone.^{†} Streaming-only figures based on certification alone.

== Release history ==
Release history and formats for "How Sweet"
Region	Date	Format	Label	Ref.
Various	May 24, 2024	Digital download; streaming	ADOR	
South Korea	May 24, 2024	CD	ADOR	
United States	May 24, 2024	CD	ADOR; Geffen	
