= Byul.org =

South Korean electronica band

- Origin: Seoul, South Korea
- Genres: Electronica; Dreampop
- Years active: 2001–present
- Labels: Burnt Toast Vinyl; Alien Transistor; Morr Music
- Members: Cho Tae-sang; Jowall; Suh Hyun-jung; Yi Suhn-joo; Hur Yu; Hwang So-yoon
- Past members: Ganesha; Yi Yun-yi; Park Chang-yong; Sohn Tae-woong; Suh Sang-young
- Website: byul.org

Byul.org (Korean: 모임 별; RR: Moim Byul) is an electronica, dreampop band and design studio based in Seoul, South Korea.

== History and activity ==
Cho Tae-sang started his music career in the 1990s when he was a teenager. He performed in various locations such as Hongdae street and Insa dong. Meanwhile, his younger brother Jowall has been active since 1999, playing in the bands Vacuum Orchestra(진공악단) and Underwears Band. The brothers collaborated on a song titled 'Bleu Bulb Light' for the first time when Cho was 21 and Jowall was 15. This song later became one of the band's signature tracks.

Byul.org was formed in January 2000 by the brothers, Cho Tae-sang and Jowall. Initially, it began as a poetry recital meeting among friends. The following year, in 2001, they composed the title of the original soundtrack for the movie Take Care of My Cat which starred Bae Doona. This marked the beginning of their recognition and public attention.

They have been played on NTS Live in shows including Lightning Conductor with Lena Willikens, featured first on March 21, 2017. Their music distribution in the United States is handled by Burnt Toast Vinyl, while Alien Transistor and Morr Music handle distribution in Europe.

In 2018 Hwang So-yoon of Se So Neon joined the band. They participated in the soundtrack of Ten Months in 2021. In 2023, they supported Brokenteeth's concert.

== Discography ==
- Secret Stories Heard From a Girl in an Opium Den (2011)
- Selected Tracks for Nacht Dämonen (2017)
- Nobody's Gold (2018)
