= You or Me (Kuang Program album) =

2013 album by Kuang Program

Studio album by Kuang Program
- Released: August 8, 2013
- Genre: Post-punk
- Length: 41:00
- Language: Korean, English
- Label: Self-released
- Producer: Kuang Program

Kuang Program chronology
(For city) Special Demo (2012)	You or Me (2013)	Flames, Dreams, Laughter (2014)

You or Me (Korean: 나 아니면 너; RR: Na animyeon neo) is the debut studio album by South Korean post-punk duo Kuang Program. The album was released on 8 August 2013.

== Background ==
In 2012, Kuang Program released two EPs, This is The End of Us and (For City) Special Demo. The cover image of the album is a certain erasure of the duo's photos, and Choi Taehyeon explained that he was trying to create "an image where you become me and I become you."

== Critical reception ==
Choi Minwoo of Weiv reviewed "the album seems to be desperately trying to go beyond its context, and that the moments when the effort is rewarded are heard." Cho Jihwan of Tonplein described You or Me as an album describing noise as a result of a common situation in which several people gather and live in one place.

== Track listing ==
No.	Title	Length
1.	"Whatch"	2:49
2.	"30Km"	5:09
3.	"You or Me" ("나 아니면 너")	4:58
4.	"Goblin Market" ("도깨비시장")	4:02
5.	"333"	4:12
6.	"Dos à Dos" ("도시도")	4:33
7.	"Gangs Are Blue"	4:12
8.	"Jalsalachim" ("잘살아침")	3:20
9.	"625720"	4:23
10.	"Green Light" ("녹색빛")	3:22
