= OMG (NewJeans song) =

2023 single by NewJeans

Song by NewJeans

from the album OMG
- Language: Korean; English
- B-side: "Ditto"
- Released: January 2, 2023
- Studio: Hybe Studio
- Genre: R&B; hip hop; pop
- Length: 3:32
- Label: ADOR
- Composers: Park Jin-su; Ylva Dimberg; David Dawood
- Lyricists: Gigi; Ylva Dimberg; Hanni
- Producer: Park Jin-su

NewJeans singles chronology
"Ditto" (2022)	"OMG" (2023)	"Super Shy" (2023)

Music videos
- "OMG" on YouTube "OMG" (Performance ver. 1) on YouTube "OMG" (Performance ver. 2) on YouTube

"OMG" is a song by the South Korean idol girl group NewJeans from their single album of the same name (2023). ADOR, a division of Hybe Corporation, released "OMG" for download and streaming on January 2, 2023. Park Jin-su produced the track and composed it with Ylva Dimberg and David Dawood. The lyrics, written by Dimberg, Gigi, and NewJeans member Hanni, were inspired by high school dramas and explore themes of young love, dedication, and one-sided affection. It blends R&B, hip hop, and pop, featuring hip-hop percussion, trap rhythms, and a UK garage-inflected groove. The song includes plucked staccato synth chords, skittering cowbells, and layered vocal harmonies and percussion.

Buoyed by its viral success on the video-sharing platform TikTok, "OMG" peaked at number 10 on the Billboard Global 200, number seven on the Billboard Japan Hot 100, and number two on the South Korean Circle Digital Chart. It peaked at number one in Singapore and on Billboard's Hits of the World charts for South Korea, Taiwan, and Vietnam. The song received positive reviews for its lyrics and catchy production. NME and Billboard ranked it among the best K-pop songs of 2023.

Referencing Park Chan-wook's 2006 film I'm a Cyborg, But That's OK, the music video depicts the members with different mental illusions. This connects to "Ditto" through shared uniforms and themes. To promote "OMG", NewJeans performed it on South Korean music programs, international music festivals, and awards shows. The Recording Industry Association of Japan and the Korea Music Content Association certified the song platinum for exceeding 100 million streams. It won Best Song at the 33rd Seoul Music Awards, Song of the Year at Japan Gold Disc Awards, and received a nomination for Top Global K-pop Song at the 2023 Billboard Music Awards.

== Background and release ==
The South Korean idol girl group NewJeans debuted in August 2022 with their self-titled debut extended play, which was surprise-released and featured a string of commercially successful singles: "Attention", "Hype Boy", and "Cookie". On November 10, 2022, during Hybe Corporation's annual community press conference on YouTube, CEO Jiwon Park announced that NewJeans' first single album, OMG, would be released on January 2, 2023. According to a press release, the two-track single album would include the eponymous lead single "OMG" and a pre-release single, "Ditto", which would be released on December 19, 2022. The first teasers for the album were released on December 12. As scheduled, the single was released for download and streaming alongside b side single "Ditto" through several music portals including iTunes and Melon. Remixed by its original producer Park Jin-su, a new version of "OMG" served as the lead single for NewJeans' first remix album, NJWMX, released on December 19, 2023.

== Music and lyrics ==
"OMG" contains lyrics in both Korean and English that were written by group member Hanni, Gigi, and Ylva Dimberg. Dimberg also composed the track with David Dawood and producer Park Jin-su. Hanni said that she was inspired by "high school teen dramas where the girls are at their lockers and they're talking about a guy they like" when writing the lyrics. She tried to make the lyrics conversational and find the right words in both Korean and English so that "the pronunciation [...] sticks to the melody".

The song is about a blossoming young love; the narrator dedicates the song to somebody who is there for her love ("No I can never let him go/ I only think of you 24/ I'm a lucky girl I know, I know/ Before I met you/ Everything was pointless"). The narrator's friends ask her, "Who is he?" The romance appears to be one-sided at times and drives the narrator crazy ("Wherever, whenever/ There ain't nothing else that I would hold on to/ I hear his voice through all the noise/ Don't let go of my hand for one second no, no/ Got no worries 'cause I got someone/ It's okay to be alone 'cause I love someone"). In the refrain, Hanni sings, "I was really hoping/ That he will come through", hinting at the disappointment and melancholy that the narrator experiences. The members perform in both pop vocals and melodic rapping.

"OMG"
A sample demonstrating the pre-chorus and chorus of "OMG", an R&B-hip hop track that incorporates trap percussion and rhythms, skittering cowbells, and staccato synths.

"OMG" opens with plucked, staccato synth chords and progresses with skittering cowbells and anchoring percussion in the pre-chorus. The chorus features vocal chopping and the track concludes with layered percussion, vocal harmonies, and piano. It mixes elements of club genres including hip hop, R&B, trap, and UK garage, showcased through its hip-hop percussion, trap rhythms, and UK garage-inflected groove. Pitchfork's Joshua Minsoo Kim described "OMG" as a "soft, minimalist R&B" track, while Beats Per Minute's JT Early described it as "bouncy synth-R&B". Hankook Ilbo popular music journalist Ko Kyung-seok deemed it a "simple hip-hop R&B" track. August Brown of the Los Angeles Times considered the song "Y2K-era pop/R&B", whereas Maura Johnston of Rolling Stone deemed it a throwback to 1990s R&B with a "21st-century appeal" brought by the synths. The remix was described in a press release as a hip hop track with an Afro rhythm.

== Reception ==
"OMG" received generally positive reviews. Writing for Pitchfork, Joshua Minsoo Kim said that the song "offers a sweet portrait of private longing". Popular music journalist Ko Kyung-seok of Hankook Ilbo said "it draws the listener in with an easy-to-listen arrangement". NME's Rhian Daly commented that although "OMG" was not as strong as the group's last single "Hype Boy", it still "is both a nonchalant shrugging off of the burden of swift success and a steady step forward for a group seemingly already on the path to being K-pop superstars". The magazine ranked the song eighth on their list of the 25 best K-pop songs of 2023, praising the "touch of sass" and "perennial cheeky lyricism". Billboard also featured it as one of the 25 best K-pop songs of the year, lauding the production for its both "familiar and forward-looking" sound. Rolling Stone and the Los Angeles Times included "OMG" in their lists of the Best Songs of 2023 So Far, both published in June; the former regarded it as a "pristine pop song with a glowing—and glowed-up—heart at its core" and the latter said it proved NewJeans as a "new hope" for the label Hybe. Associated Press writer Maria Sherman included the song in her list of the best songs of 2023. "OMG" also appeared at number 26 on Consequence's list of the best songs of 2023.

"OMG" was met with viral success on the video-sharing platform TikTok and prompted many dance challenges. It peaked at number 10 on the Billboard Global 200. In South Korea, "OMG" peaked at number two on the South Korean Circle Digital Chart and was the second best-performing song of January 2023, trailing behind the group's "Ditto". It was the fourth best-performing song of the year in South Korea and was certified platinum by the Korea Music Content Association (KMCA) for exceeding 100 million streams. In Japan, "OMG" peaked at number seven on the Japan Hot 100 chart and was certified platinum by the Recording Industry Association of Japan (RIAJ) for surpassing 100 million streams. The single peaked atop the singles chart in Singapore and Billboard's Hits of the World charts for South Korea, Taiwan, and Vietnam. In North America, it peaked at number 74 on the US Billboard Hot 100 and number 35 on the Canadian Hot 100 and is the group's most streamed song on Spotify.

== Accolades ==
Award and nominations for "OMG"
Organization	Year	Award	Result	Ref.
Billboard Music Awards	2023	Top Global K-Pop Song	Nominated	
The Fact Music Awards	2023	Best Music – Spring	Nominated	
Japan Gold Disc Awards	2024	Song of the Year by Streaming – Asia	Won	
Seoul Music Awards	2023	Best Song Award	Won	

Music program awards
Program	Date	Ref.
M Countdown	January 12, 2023	
Inkigayo	January 15, 2023	
Inkigayo	March 19, 2023	
Inkigayo	March 26, 2023	
Music Bank	January 27, 2023	

== Promotion ==
To promote "OMG", NewJeans performed the song on two South Korean music programs: Inkigayo and Music Bank. The group included the song in their set lists for music festivals that they participated in 2023, including Weverse Con Festival in South Korea, Lollapalooza in the U.S., Summer Sonic Festival in Japan, and Music Bank Global Festival in South Korea and Japan. They also performed "OMG" on awards shows, including the 37th Golden Disc Awards, the 2023 Billboard Music Awards, and the 2023 Asia Artist Awards.

== Music video ==
The 6-minute music video for "OMG" was released on January 2, 2023, alongside the single album's release. Directed by Shin Woo-seok of Dolphiners Films and produced by the group's creative director Min Hee-jin, it depicts the group's members in a mental hospital, referencing Park Chan-wook's rom-com film I'm a Cyborg, But That's OK (2006). The music video also features a cameo from actor Kim Joo-hun, known for It's Okay to Not Be Okay. The video portrays NewJeans members as psychiatric hospital patients with delusions. Hanni starts by introducing herself as Siri, Apple’s virtual assistant. Danielle follows next, claiming that they are the popular K-pop idol group NewJeans. Other members think of themselves as a doctor, Cinderella, Snow White, the Little Match Girl, and a cat, Kim initially appears as a doctor but later seems to be a patient himself. Throughout the video, the delusions of each member are revealed, with Danielle breaking the fourth wall and appearing to be the only one aware that they are K-pop singers. Each member's storyline reflects on how they ended up in the hospital, connecting visually to "Ditto" through shared uniforms and themes, suggesting a continuous narrative between the two videos. The music video encourages fans, known as Bunnies, to interpret the visual storytelling and connect it to the lore from "Ditto."

=== Controversy ===
After the post-credits scene, the bonus clip features a patient typing a tweet expressing discomfort with the material of the music video, suggesting that idol music videos should only focus on showing faces and choreography. This sparked speculation that the clip was targeting fans who had interpreted the group's previous hit, "Cookie," in various ways. Critics and fans alike raised concerns about the portrayal of dissenting opinions as mental illness. Music critic Kim Do-heon questioned whether Ador's CEO, Min Hee-jin, was dismissing all criticism as malicious comments. Another critic, Jung Min-jae, felt that the director's perspective on art overshadowed the group's image. Despite this, NewJeans member Hye-in mentioned in a radio interview that they were aware of the clip's meaning before filming but preferred to leave it open to viewers' interpretations.

== Credits and personnel ==
Credits are adapted from the liner notes of OMG.

Location

- Recorded, engineered and edited at Hybe Studio

Credits and personnel

- NewJeans – vocals, background vocals
  - Hanni (NewJeans) – lyrics
- Jinsu Park – composition, instrumental, programming
- Ylva Dimberg – composition, lyrics, background vocals
- David Dawood – composition
- Gigi – lyrics
- Heejin Min – vocal directing
- Jungwoo Jang – vocal directing
- Hyejin Choi – vocal editing
- Emily Kim – background vocals
- Sujeong Kim – recording engineer
- Phil Tan – mix engineer
- Bill Zimmerman – additional engineering

== Charts ==
=== Weekly charts ===
Weekly chart performance
Chart (2023)	Peak position
Argentina (Argentina Hot 100)	76
Australia (ARIA)	43
Canada Hot 100 (Billboard)	35
Global 200 (Billboard)	10
Hong Kong (Billboard)	6
Indonesia (Billboard)	3
Japan Hot 100 (Billboard)	7
Japan Digital Singles (Oricon)	37
Japan Streaming (Oricon)	7
Malaysia (Billboard)	4
Malaysia International (RIM)	4
New Zealand (Recorded Music NZ)	31
Philippines (Billboard)	3
Portugal (AFP)	195
Singapore (RIAS)	1
South Korea (Billboard)	1
South Korea (Circle)	2
Taiwan (Billboard)	1
UK Independent (Official Charts)	39
US Billboard Hot 100	74
US World Digital Song Sales (Billboard)	3
Vietnam (Vietnam Hot 100)	1

=== Monthly charts ===
Monthly chart performance
Chart (2023)	Peak position
South Korea (Circle)	2

=== Year-end charts ===
2023 year-end chart performance for "OMG"
Chart (2023)	Position
Global 200 (Billboard)	41
Japan (Japan Hot 100)	31
South Korea (Circle)	4

2024 year-end chart performance for "OMG"
Chart (2024)	Position
Japan (Japan Hot 100)	77
South Korea (Circle)	59

2025 year-end chart performance for "OMG"
Chart (2025)	Position
South Korea (Circle)	146

== Certifications ==
Certifications
Region	Certification	Certified units/sales
New Zealand (RMNZ)	Platinum	30,000^{‡}
United Kingdom (BPI)	Silver	200,000^{‡}
Streaming
Japan (RIAJ)	2× Platinum	200,000,000^{†}
South Korea (KMCA)	Platinum	100,000,000^{†}
^{‡} Sales+streaming figures based on certification alone.^{†} Streaming-only figures based on certification alone.

== Release history ==
Release history
Region	Date	Format	Label	Ref.
Various	January 2, 2023	Digital download; streaming	ADOR; YG Plus	
