= 8th Asia Artist Awards =

2023 edition of award ceremony

2023 Asia Artist Awards
- Official poster
- Awarded for: Outstanding achievements in the music, television and film industry
- Date: December 14, 2023
- Venue: Philippine Arena, Bocaue, Philippines
- Country: South Korea
- Presented by: Star News; Asia Artists Awards Organising Committee; TONZ Entertainment; PULP Live World
- Hosted by: Jang Won-young; Kang Daniel; Sung Han-bin
- Website: asiaartistawards.com

Television/radio coverage
- Network: Weverse (Worldwide); Hulu Japan; Lazada (Philippines)

The 2023 Asia Artist Awards (Korean: 2023 아시아 아티스트 어워즈), the 8th edition, presented by Star News, took place on December 14, 2023, at the Philippine Arena, Bulacan, Philippines. The ceremony was hosted by Kang Daniel, Jang Won-young, and Sung Han-bin. It was broadcast live on Weverse worldwide (except Philippines, Japan and Vietnam), Hulu Japan, and Lazada in the Philippines.

== Overview ==
The Asia Artist Awards select winners by recognizing notable contributions and achievements by South Korean artists in Asian television, film, and music made throughout the past year.

=== Screening method ===
Winners are selected based on data gathered from global fans in South Korea, Japan, China, Taiwan, Hong Kong, Singapore, Indonesia, Vietnam, and the Philippines in Asia; Argentina in South America; Mexico in North America; and Europe.

=== Artists ===
The following artists attended the award show:

Singers	Actors and Actresses
SEVENTEEN BSS; NewJeans; Le Sserafim; BoyNextDoor; Nmixx; Zerobaseone; Stray Kids; Itzy; The Boyz; Kwon Eun-bi; &Team; STAYC; Kep1er; Jang Won-young; Ben&Ben; Sakurazaka46; Dreamcatcher; Lee Young-ji; Lapillus; Kard; Tempest; Kim Jae-joong; DinDin; Ash Island; Yao Chen; SB19; Hori7on; Oneus; Kingdom; ATBO; Lun8; AKMU; Lim Young-woong; Paul Blanco; WHIB	Kim Seon-ho; Ahn Hyo-seop; Kim Se-jeong; Moon Ka-young; Lee Dong-hwi; Lee Joon-hyuk; Cha Joo-young; Lee Eun-saem; Lee Jun-ho; Jung Sung-il; Kim Young-dae; Lee Jun-young; Moon Sang-min; Yoo Seon-ho; Ahn Dong-goo; Park Jae-chan; Suho; Kim Ji-hoon; Kang Daniel; Kentaro Sakaguchi; Melai Cantiveros; Kathryn Bernardo; Daniel Padilla

Hori7on, SB19 and Ben&Ben were the first Filipino acts to participate in the awards show. TV host and comedian Ryan Bang also served as host of the red carpet event.

== Winners ==
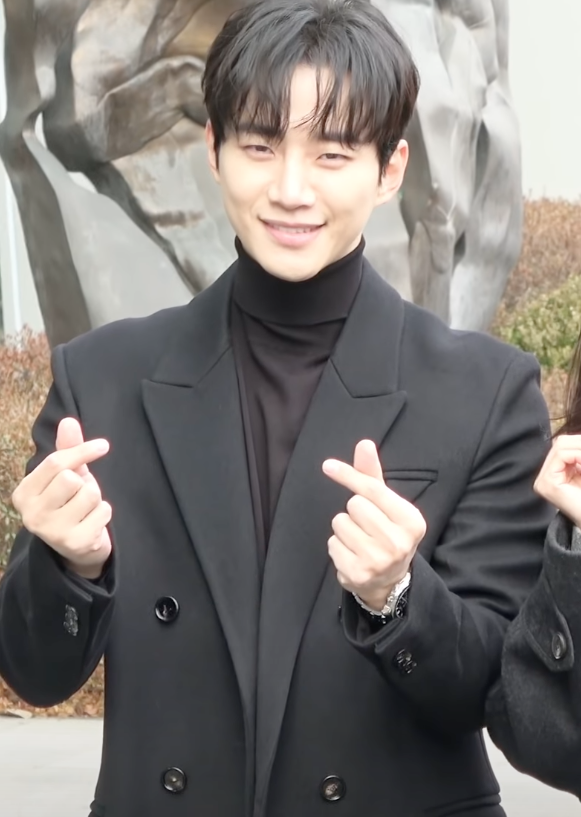
Lee Jun Ho, winner of Actor of the Year Grand Prize (Daesang)

Winners are listed and emphasized in bold.

Grand Prize (Daesang)
**Actor of the Year: Lee Jun-ho**; **Singer of the Year: NewJeans**; **Album of the Year: Seventeen – FML**; **Song of the Year: NewJeans – "Ditto"**; **Stage of the Year: Stray Kids**; **Performance of the Year: BSS**; **Fandom of the Year: Lim Young-woong (Hero Generation)**
Best Artist Award
Television / Film	Music
**Kentaro Sakaguchi**; **Kim Ji-hoon**; **Kim Seon-ho**	**AKMU**; **Itzy**; **Ive**; **Le Sserafim**; **SB19**; **The Boyz**
Fabulous Award
Television / Film	Music
**Daniel Padilla**; **Kathryn Bernardo**	**Lim Young-woong**; **NewJeans**; **Stray Kids**
Rookie of the Year
Television / Film	Music
**Lee Eun-saem**; **Moon Sang-min**	**Zerobaseone**
Asia Celebrity
Television	Music
**Kentaro Sakaguchi**; **Kim Seon-ho**	**Jang Won-young**; **Le Sserafim**; **NewJeans**
Best Emotive Award
Television / Film	Music
**Suho**	**&Team**; **BoyNextDoor**; **Oneus**
Hot Trend Award
Television / Film	Music
**Ahn Hyo-seop**; **Lee Jun-ho**	**Lim Young-woong**; **NewJeans**; **SB19**
Popularity Award
Television / Film	Music
**Lee Jun-ho**; **Kim Se-jeong**	**Lim Young-woong**; **Sakurazaka46**
Best Icon Award
Television / Film	Music
**Cha Joo-young**	**Kep1er**; **Nmixx**; **Tempest**
New Wave Award
Television / Film	Music
**Park Jae-chan**	**Ash Island**; **Kingdom**; **Yao Chen**
Potential Award
Television / Film	Music
**Yoo Seon-ho**	**ATBO**; **Lapillus**; **Paul Blanco**
Focus Award
Television / Film	Music
**Younghoon**; **Ahn Dong-goo**	**Hori7on**; **Lun8**
Best Performance Award	Top of K-pop Record Award
**Le Sserafim**	**Kim Jae-joong**
Best Actor Award	Scene Stealer Award
**Ahn Hyo-seop**; **Kim Se-jeong**; **Lee Dong-hwi**; **Lee Joon-hyuk**; **Melai Cantiveros**	**Jung Sung-il**
Best Musician Award	Best Acting Performance Award
**Kard**; **Kwon Eun-bi**; **Sakurazaka46**; **STAYC**; **Zerobaseone**	**Kim Young-dae**; **Lee Jun-young**; **Moon Ka-young**; **Suho**
Best Choice Award	Best Producer Award
**&Team**; **Ben&Ben**; **BoyNextDoor**; **DinDin**; **Dreamcatcher**; **Kang Daniel**; **Kim Jae-joong**; **Lee Young-ji**; **Lim Young-woong**; **Nmixx**; **NewJeans**	**Seo Hyun-joo (Starship Entertainment)**
Best Creator Award
**3Racha**

== Performers ==
The following individuals, listed in order of appearance, performed musical numbers.

Artist(s)	Song(s) Performed	Ref.
WHIB	"Dizzy (Intro)" and "Bang!"	
SB19 (with &Team)	"Gento", "Mana", "Bazinga" and "Crimzone"	
Lapillus	"Who's Next"	
Hori7on	"Six7een" (Rock ver.)	
Lun8	"Wild Heart"	
ATBO	"Mayday" and "Next to Me"	
Yao Chen	"Adventure Player"	
Paul Blanco	"Summer"	
Kingdom	"Coup D'Etat"	
Ash Island	"Melody" (Band ver.)	
Tempest	"Vroom Vroom" and "Dive"	
Nmixx	"Love Me Like This" and "Soñar (Breaker)"	
Kep1er	"Giddy"	
Oneus	"Baila Conmigo"	
Lee Young-ji	"I Am Lee Young Ji" and "Not Sorry"	
BoyNextDoor	"But Sometimes" and "One and Only"	
Zerobaseone	"In Bloom" and "Crush"	
Kim Jae-joong	"One Kiss" and "Mine"	
DinDin	"I'm Not Myself When I'm Around You" and "Foolin' Myself"	
Dreamcatcher	"Shatter" and "OOTD"	
&Team	"Dropkick" (Korean ver.) and "War Cry"	
Kang Daniel	"Selfish" and "Nirvana"	
Kard	"Icky" and "Cake"	
STAYC	"Teddy Bear" and "Bubble"	
Kwon Eun-bi	"Underwater"	
Sakurazaka46	"Shoninyokkyu"	
NewJeans	"OMG", "ETA" and "Super Shy"	
Le Sserafim	"Perfect Night" and "Eve, Psyche & the Bluebeard's Wife"	
AKMU	"Love Lee" and "Give Love"	
Itzy	"Kill Shot" and "Cake"	
The Boyz	"Watch It"	
Lim Young-woong	"Grain of Sand" and "Do or Die"	
Stray Kids	"Maniac", "Get Lit", "Topline" and "Lalalala"	
BSS (with Lee Young-ji)	"7PM", "Fighting" and "Just Do It"	
