= Kuang Program =

South Korean post-punk band

- Origin: Seoul, South Korea
- Genres: Post-punk; new wave; garage rock; noise rock
- Years active: 2011-present
- Labels: Maansun; Helicopter Records
- Members: Choi Taehyeon; Seo Kyeongsoo
- Past members: Kim Younghoon; Kwon Yongnam

Kuang Program (Korean: 쾅프로그램) is a South Korean post-punk band. The band currently consists of Choi Taehyeon and Seo Kyeongsoo. Since their formation in 2011, the band has released three studio albums You or Me (나 아니면 너) (2013), Closed Eyes (감은 눈) (2016) and There is No More Snow on the Television (2021).

== History ==
Kuang Program was formed by Choi Taehyeon and Kim Younghoon in 2011, and released two EPs, This is the End of Us and (For City) Special Demo in 2012. The band released their first album You or Me (나 아니면 너) in 2013. After the album's release, Kim Young-hoon left the band while serving in the military. They appeared on The EBS space and performed.

In 2016, they released their second studio album Closed Eyes (감은 눈). Yoon Hojoon of Music Y described the album as "Like the masterpieces of this genre, Closed Eyes is an interesting text about the flesh and materialisation of sound and did as well as they did decades ago." Seo Kyeongsoo joined the band as a new drummer, and in 2021, they released their third studio album There is No More Snow on the Television. In 2022, they had a tour in South Korea, and Soumbalgwang supported them.

== Discography ==
=== Studio albums ===
- You or Me (나 아니면 너) (2013)
- Closed Eyes (감은 눈) (2016)
- There is No More Snow on the Television (2021)

=== EPs ===
- This is the End of Us (2012)
- (For City) Special Demo (2012)
- Flames, Dreams, Laughter (불꽃, 꿈, 폭소) (2014)
