= Bulssazo =

South Korean noise rock band

- Origin: Seoul, South Korea
- Genres: Rock; shoegaze; indie rock; post-rock
- Years active: 2005-present
- Label: Beatball Records
- Members: Han Sangcheol; Seo Myeonghoon; Kim Seonyeob

Bulssazo (Korean: 불싸조) is a South Korean rock band. The band currently consists of Han Sangcheol, Seo Myeonghoon and Kim Seonyeob. Since their formation in 2005, the band has released four studio albums. The band is known for its bizarre naming of albums and songs, the second album is called I in Turn Will Laugh When Disaster Strikes You; I Will Mock When Calamity Overtakes You. (Proverbs 1:26) from a verse from Book of Proverbs, and the third album is called Banquo: It Will Be Rain Tonight / 1st Murderer: Let It Come Down from a verse from Macbeth. Their second studio album was nominated for the Best Rock Album at the 2007 Korean Music Awards.

== Career ==
Bulssazo was formed in 2005. They released their first studio album Furious Five in 2005, In 2006, they released their second studio album, I in Turn Will Laugh When Disaster Strikes You; I Will Mock When Calamity Overtakes You. (Proverbs 1:26), taken from the verse of Book of Proverbs. The album was nominated for Best Rock Album at the 2007 Korean Music Awards. They appeared and performed on The EBS space with indie musician Han Heejeong.

In 2011, they released their third album, Banquo: It Will Be Rain Tonight / 1st Murderer: Let It Come Down on cassette. Lim Seungkyoon of Weiv reviewed the album as "The album was entirely made as they wished. And that's exactly what allowed Bulssazo to become the most original sounding band in Korea." The band released the album on vinyl in 2015.

In 2016, they released their fourth album Hankook Hiphop (한(국힙)합). In 2018, they held a performance at the Seoul Ingi Festival.

In addition to his music activities, guitarist Han Sangcheol is also a music and film critic. He is working a columnist at the Korea Policy Briefing, a news website run by Ministry of Culture, Sports and Tourism. He supported 250's performances in 2023. Bassist Seo Myeonghoon is also working as a solo musician under the name Nuh.

== Discography ==
=== Albums ===
- Furious Five (2005)
- I in Turn Will Laugh When Disaster Strikes You; I Will Mock When Calamity Overtakes You. (Proverbs 1:26) (너희가 재앙을 만날 때에 내가 웃을 것이며 너희에게 두려움이 임할 때에 내가 비웃으리라 (잠언 1:26)) (2006)
- Banquo: It Will Be Rain Tonight / 1st Murderer: Let It Come Down (뱅쿠오: 오늘밤 비가 내릴 모양이구나. / 첫번째 암살자: 운명을 받아 들여라.) (2011)
- Hankook Hiphop (한(국힙)합) (2016)
