= Ditto (song) =

2022 single by NewJeans

Single by NewJeans

from the album OMG
- Language: Korean; English
- Released: December 19, 2022
- Genre: Baltimore club; electronic; dance
- Length: 3:05
- Label: ADOR
- Composers: 250; Ylva Dimberg
- Lyricists: Ylva Dimberg; The Black Skirts; Oohyo; Minji
- Producer: 250

NewJeans singles chronology
"Cookie" (2022)	"Ditto" (2022)	"OMG" (2023)

Music video
- "Ditto" (Side A) on YouTube "Ditto" (Side B) on YouTube

"Ditto" is a song by the South Korean girl group NewJeans, released on December 19, 2022, by ADOR, a label of Hybe Corporation. The producer 250 composed "Ditto" with Ylva Dimberg, who wrote the lyrics with The Black Skirts, Oohyo, and NewJeans member Minji. With a sound rooted in Baltimore club, the track incorporates a balladic electronic and dance production with influences of house, breakbeat, and UK garage. The lyrics are about reminiscing about a platonic love.

"Ditto" topped South Korea's Circle Digital Chart for a record-breaking 13 weeks. It peaked at number eight on the Billboard Global 200; topped the charts in Indonesia, Singapore, Taiwan, and Vietnam; and reached the top 10 in Japan, Hong Kong, Malaysia, and the Philippines. Music critics praised the wintry, minimalist, and nostalgia-inducing production and deemed it a refreshing alternative to the maximalist sound that had saturated the K-pop market. The song ranked 19th on Rolling Stone's 2023 list of the 100 Greatest Songs in the History of Korean Pop Music, being the most recent entry.

The accompanying music video was shot in Daegu, South Korea, and depicts the group members as high-school students recording their daily lives using a camcorder. In 2023, it won Song of the Year at the annual Asia Artist Awards, Korean Music Awards, MAMA Awards, and Melon Music Awards. Later that year, both the Korea Music Content Association and the Recording Industry Association of Japan certified "Ditto" platinum for surpassing 100 million streams in respective countries.

== Background and release ==
South Korean girl group NewJeans released their first eponymous extended play (EP) in August 2022 to commercial success and critical acclaim. The EP topped South Korea's Circle Music Chart, selling 311,200 copies in its first week.

On November 10, 2022, ADOR announced through NewJeans' social medias that the group would release their first single album, OMG, on January 2, 2023. CEO and executive producer Min Hee-jin stated that the release would be preceded by an unnamed single "prepared for [the group's] first winter with Bunnies (NewJeans' official fanbase)" and set to be released on December 19. The song's title, "Ditto", was announced on December 12 through three moving posters: one featured lyrics from the song, while the other two showed two rabbits, one red and the other white, running. The following day, Min stated that the project would feature artists Oohyo and The Black Skirts, who had written part of "Ditto"'s lyrics, and advertising director Shin Woo-seok, who had directed its two-part music video. "Ditto" was released on December 19 alongside its music video.

== Music and lyrics ==
"Ditto"
A sample of the song's opening section. With a sound rooted in Baltimore club, "Ditto" is driven by choral synth pads and staccato 808 drums that create beats evoking UK garage and house.

The producer 250 programmed "Ditto" and composed it with Ylva Dimberg. The song is set in a time signature of 8/4 and has a fast tempo of around 130 beats per minute. It has a balladic production rooted in Baltimore club, expanding on the club-music sensibilities of NewJeans' past songs. With a primarily electronic and dance sound, "Ditto" opens with atmospheric synth pads over which group member Hyein hums. Soft, staccato beats and claps using 808 drums drive the track and create syncopated rhythms that evoke UK garage, breakbeat, and 1980s house. The song incorporates a low bassline and occasional hi-hats as it progresses over the synth choral base.

Yoo Seong-eun from the South Korean music webzine Music Y said the song's rhythm evokes late-2000s Japanese Shibuya-kei artists such as FreeTEMPO and Daishi Dance, whereas its atmosphere reminisces the Weeknd's alternative R&B track "Die for You" (2016). Music critics described the production as hazy, ethereal, and dreamy, which evokes a wintry atmosphere. Joshua Minsoo Kim of NPR wrote that the synth chords feel like "freshly fallen snow, embodying the down-home comforts of the holiday season", and JT Early of Beats Per Minute felt the soundscape was "chill" and "slightly darker" than the group's previous output. Crystal Leww of Rolling Stone described the song as "a dreamy, sepia-toned memory of a teenage crush".

The lyrics were written by group members Minji, Ylva Dimberg, The Black Skirts, and Oohyo. Reviewers interpreted the song as a confession of a platonic love. NewJeans sing "My feelings for you, like the memories we share, have grown so big", hoping that they are reciprocated. Minji said that while writing "Ditto", she envisioned a scene of "a winter mountain that felt kind of cold, but warm at the same time", which made her "put some objects inside the mountain, for example, like a tree house and a campfire".

== Critical reception ==
Professional ratings
Review scores
Source	Rating
IZM	3/5 stars

Kim appreciated NewJeans' minimalist production choices that set them apart from their contemporaries in the K-pop scene. Ko Kyung-seok of the Hankook Ilbo praised 250's production and noted that the composition, though straightforward, "hides experimentation and complexity". Bang Ho-jung of Kookje Shinmoon was moved by the song and thought that the "simple sound" allows the listener to focus on the vocals, melody, and lyrics. Critic Kim Yun-ha deemed the composition "ordinary", but found the song emotionally touching, writing that "Ditto" encapsulates a winter made of "small fragments of memories that were hidden between the bone-chilling sub-zero cold, the huge tree, the noisy street scene and the laughter of friends".

Beats Per Minute's JT Early wrote that the song "best captures the 'winter' side of the group, refreshing and slightly darker in the soundscape". Sara Delgrado of Teen Vogue deemed "Ditto" one of their best releases yet, while Rolling Stone India's Divyansha Dongre said that the track was a "phenomenal" ending to their 2022 "musical chapter". Crystal Bell placed "Ditto" at number 25 in Mashable's list of the 25 best K-pop songs of 2022. Rolling Stone ranked it number 19 in their 2023 list of the 100 Greatest Songs in the History of Korean Pop Music. Webzine Music Y ranked "Ditto" first place in their ranking of the 10 best songs of 2023. Kim Do-heon, member of the selection committee at the Korean Music Awards, described "Ditto" as "fresh and warm at the same time, new and nostalgic at the same time, a song that symbolizes the winter of 2022". Paste placed the song at 23 on their list of the 100 best songs of the 2020s so far.

== Accolades ==
"Ditto" won eight first-place music program awards in South Korea, including a triple crown (three awards) on Inkigayo. It also won a Melon Weekly Popularity Award on January 23, 2023.

Awards and nominations for "Ditto"
Award ceremony	Year	Category	Result	Ref.
Asia Artist Awards	2023	Song of the Year	Won	
Billboard Music Awards	2023	Top Global K-Pop Song	Nominated	
Circle Chart Music Awards	2024	Artist of the Year – Digital	Won	
Circle Chart Music Awards	2024	Artist of the Year – Streaming Unique Listeners	Won	
Clio Music Awards	2024	Best Music Videos	Shortlisted	
Golden Disc Awards	2024	Digital Daesang (Song of the Year)	Won	
Golden Disc Awards	2024	Digital Song Bonsang	Won	
Japan Record Awards	2023	Excellent Work Award	Won	
Japan Record Awards	2023	Grand Prix	Nominated	
Korean Music Awards	2024	Song of the Year	Won	
Korean Music Awards	2024	Best K-pop Song	Won	
MAMA Awards	2023	Song of the Year	Won	
MAMA Awards	2023	Best Dance Performance Female Group	Won	
Melon Music Awards	2023	Song of the Year	Won	
Music Awards Japan	2025	Best K-pop Song in Japan	Won	

Music program awards for "Ditto"
Program	Date	Ref.
Show! Music Core	January 7, 2023	
Show! Music Core	January 14, 2023	
Show! Music Core	January 28, 2023	
Show! Music Core	February 4, 2023	
Inkigayo	January 8, 2023	
Inkigayo	January 29, 2023	
Inkigayo	February 5, 2023	
Music Bank	January 13, 2023	

== Commercial performance ==
"Ditto" debuted at number one on South Korea's Circle Digital Chart in the issue dated December 18–25, 2022, earning NewJeans their second number-one single in the country after "Attention". It remained atop the chart for thirteen weeks, becoming the longest-running number one song in the chart's history. The song debuted at number one on the Billboard Vietnam Hot 100 in the chart issue dated December 29, 2022, becoming their first number-one single in the country. It topped the chart for three consecutive weeks, after which it was replaced by their own "OMG", making NewJeans the international artist with the most weeks atop the chart alongside Blackpink. "Ditto" reached number one on the Indonesia Songs chart. The song spent three and four consecutive weeks atop Singapore's Top Streaming Chart and the Taiwan Songs chart, respectively. In Japan, the song peaked at number 12 on the Billboard Japan Hot 100 and number 13 on the Oricon Combined Singles Chart.

In the United Kingdom, "Ditto" was NewJeans' first entry on the Official Singles Chart, peaking at number 95. The song debuted at number 17 on the Bubbling Under Hot 100 in the chart issue dated January 7, 2023, and entered the US Billboard Hot 100 at number 96 two weeks later with 5.1 million US streams, becoming the group's first entry on the chart. They were the fastest Korean act to enter the chart and the fifth Korean group after Wonder Girls, BTS, Blackpink and Twice. The song peaked at number 82 in its fifth week on the chart. "Ditto" became NewJeans' highest-ranked song on the Billboard Argentina Hot 100, reaching number 43. It also charted in Australia (54), Canada (43), Hong Kong (3), Malaysia (2), the Netherlands (31), Philippines (2), and Portugal (153).

The song was NewJeans' first top-10 hit on the Billboard Global Excl. US, peaking at number four with 41.9 million streams and 3,000 digital downloads sold from December 30, 2022, to January 5, 2023. It debuted at number 36 on the Billboard Global 200 in the chart issue dated December 31, 2022, and peaked at number eight two weeks later with 46.5 million streams and 4,000 digital downloads sold, making NewJeans the fourth Korean group to enter the chart's top-10 after BTS, Blackpink, and Big Bang.

== Music video ==
=== Development ===
Director Shin Woo-seok, CEO of South Korean video production company Dolphiners Films, was approached by Min to direct a music video about the relationship between idols and fans. She offered him full creative control, although she suggested Shin include a scene with "a deer standing alone in a snowy field". At the time, Shin wasn't interested in working in the idol industry, but found the offer intriguing and wanted to try something new. Shin said he "wanted to talk about the fact that the relationship between an idol and a fan ultimately comes to an end, the meaning of the process, and the existence of each other", but he was unsure of how the video would be received. The concept was approved by the label and Min introduced NewJeans to Shin, who described them as "pure and fun as kids their age".

Shin wanted to use an innovative scene composition compared to the "standardized framework" he had observed in most K-pop music videos. He introduced a sixth unnamed character, intended to symbolize NewJeans' fans, to provide a different point of view and to showcase the choreography in a way that fit into the story. Initially indicated as "A" in the script, Shin named the character Ban Hee-soo after the announcement of NewJeans' fandom name, Bunnies. The deer, instead, was meant to symbolize an ideal friend. Shin said he was influenced by a Greek myth of the goddess Circe found in Homer's Odyssey, where she transforms men into swine. Shin had initially planned to make only one music video, but decided to split it after the song was shortened. He explained that each part reflects one of two themes: hope and despair.

The music video was mainly shot in three locations around Jung District, Daegu: Gyeseong Middle School, Cheongna Hill, and Dongsan Medical Center. Shin wanted to faithfully portray a Korean hagwon. While thinking back to his school days, he decided to shoot part of the video with a camcorder. Shin thought it could be a realistic and effective medium to convey Hee-soo's close relationship with NewJeans, as she is shown filming her friends dancing with the camcorder. Since he didn't have time to realize CGI, Shin brought to set a real deer. Choi Hyun-wook and Park Ji-hu made cameo appearances.

=== Reception ===
The music video drew attention for its "retro yet dreamy" atmosphere that reminded Generation X viewers of their school days. Several reviewers compared it to the Whispering Corridors film series (1998–2021; also known as the Girls' High School Ghost Story series); some reviewers also compared it to Love Letter (1995) and Hana and Alice (2004) by Japanese director Shunji Iwai, famous for depicting the sense of loss and anxiety of becoming an adult in his films. Bang felt emotional watching the music video as it evoked old memories. Benjamin praised the video for "perfectly" capturing "the loneliness and awkwardness one can feel in adolescence, even when surrounded by friends". Writing for Weekly Dong-a, music critic Mimyo wrote that NewJeans "challenges the idol fantasy": while idols usually create an emotional bond with fans by showing them all facets of their lives, in the music video NewJeans are depicted as "ghost-like" figures, whose past and relation to the public is unclear. Delgrado likened the "hazy visuals" to those of Sofia Coppola's films. According to Elle Korea, the music video contributed to the resurgence of camcorders.

== Promotion ==
NewJeans performed "Ditto" on South Korean music programs Inkigayo on January 15, 2023, and Music Bank on January 20 and 27, 2023, after having already won four trophies for the song at different music programs in the previous weeks. They garnered four additional trophies, reaching a total of eight wins for "Ditto".

== Credits and personnel ==
Song

Credits adapted from Melon.

- Ylva Dimberg – composition, lyrics
- The Black Skirts – lyrics
- Oohyo – lyrics
- Minji (NewJeans) – lyrics
- 250 – composition, instrumental, programming

Music video

Credits adapted from YouTube.

- Min Hee-jin – producer
- Dolphiners Films – production
- Shin Woo-seok – director, writer
- Jongho Baek – production manager
- Sunghun Lee – planning
- Hangyeol Lee – director of photography
- Sunghye Baik – director of photography
- Hayoung Shin – gaffer
- Doosoo Choi – gaffer
- Mimi Yang – art
- Sunyeon Kim – hair and make-up designer
- Ipsae Lee – costume designer
- Hansaem Kim – location manager
- Dahye Kim – location manager
- Hyeji Moon – location mixer
- Yoonseok Jang – VFX supervisor
- Hyunah Lee – DI colorist
- Joseph Ahn – sound mixing
- Yong Kim – music
- Hyunsoo Nam – key grip
- Hyeonjong Yun – boom operator
- Junghun Lee – line producer
- Chami Kwon – line producer
- Yumi Choi – style director, styling (ADOR)
- Giihee – hair styling (ADOR)
- Naree – hair styling (ADOR)
- Eunseo Lee – make-up (ADOR)
- Hyemin Kim – artist manager (ADOR)
- Seulgi Kim – artist manager (ADOR)
- Youngsil Hwang – sound designer
- Taeyoung Im – sound designer

== Charts ==
=== Weekly charts ===
Weekly chart performance
Chart (2022–2023)	Peak position
Argentina (Argentina Hot 100)	43
Australia (ARIA)	54
Canada (Canadian Hot 100)	43
Global 200 (Billboard)	8
Hong Kong (Billboard)	3
Indonesia (Billboard)	1
Japan (Japan Hot 100)	9
Japan Combined Singles (Oricon)	13
Malaysia (Billboard)	2
Malaysia International (RIM)	8
Netherlands (Global 40)	31
New Zealand Hot Singles (RMNZ)	11
Philippines (Billboard)	2
Portugal (AFP)	153
Singapore (RIAS)	1
South Korea (Billboard)	1
South Korea (Circle)	1
Taiwan (Billboard)	1
UK Singles (Official Charts)	95
UK Indie (Official Charts)	30
US Billboard Hot 100	82
US World Digital Song Sales (Billboard)	4
Vietnam (Vietnam Hot 100)	1

=== Monthly charts ===
Monthly chart performance
Chart (2023)	Peak position
South Korea (Circle)	1

=== Year-end charts ===
2023 year-end chart performance for "Ditto"
Chart (2023)	Position
Global 200 (Billboard)	52
Japan (Japan Hot 100)	26
South Korea (Circle)	1

2024 year-end chart performance for "Ditto"
Chart (2024)	Position
Japan (Japan Hot 100)	61
South Korea (Circle)	32

2025 year-end chart performance for "Ditto"
Chart (2025)	Position
South Korea (Circle)	64

== Certifications ==
Certifications
Region	Certification	Certified units/sales
New Zealand (RMNZ)	Platinum	30,000^{‡}
Streaming
Japan (RIAJ)	3× Platinum	300,000,000^{†}
South Korea (KMCA)	2× Platinum	200,000,000^{†}
^{‡} Sales+streaming figures based on certification alone.^{†} Streaming-only figures based on certification alone.

== Release history ==
Release history
Region	Date	Format	Label	Ref.
Various	December 19, 2022	Digital download; streaming	ADOR	

== See also ==
- List of Circle Digital Chart number ones of 2022
- List of Circle Digital Chart number ones of 2023
- List of number-one songs of 2022 (Singapore)
- List of number-one songs of 2023 (Singapore)
- List of Inkigayo Chart winners (2023)
- List of Music Bank Chart winners (2023)
- List of Show! Music Core Chart winners (2023)
