= South Korea Songs =

Weekly South Korean music chart by Billboard magazine

South Korea Songs was a music record chart in South Korea compiled by Billboard since May 7, 2022, and is a replacement for the Billboard K-pop Hot 100 chart that was discontinued one week prior. The chart was updated every Tuesday on Billboard's website. It was part of Billboard's Hits of the World chart collection, ranking the top 25 songs weekly in more than 40 countries around the globe.

The first number-one song on the chart was "Still Life" by Big Bang on the issue dated May 7, 2022.

The chart was removed from all of Billboard's digital properties after the chart dated January 18, 2025, and was replaced by the Billboard Korea Hot 100 chart from December 3, 2025.

== Methodology ==
The chart tracked songs' performance from Friday to Thursday. Chart rankings are based on digital downloads from full-service digital music retailers (sales from direct-to-consumer sites such as an individual artist's store are excluded) and online streaming occurring in South Korea during the tracking period. All data are provided by Luminate Data, formerly MRC Data.

== List of number-one songs ==
Issue date	Song	Artist(s)	Wks.	Ref.
May 7, 2022	"Still Life"	Big Bang	1	
May 14, 2022	"That That"	Psy featuring Suga	3	
June 4, 2022	"Tomboy"	(G)I-dle	4	
June 25, 2022	"Yet to Come (The Most Beautiful Moment)"	BTS	1	
July 9, 2022	"Love Dive"	Ive	3	
July 23, 2022	"Girls"	Aespa	1	
August 6, 2022	"At That Moment"	Gaya-G	1	
August 13, 2022	"Sneakers"	Itzy	1	
August 20, 2022	"Attention"	NewJeans	2	
September 3, 2022	"Pink Venom"	Blackpink	2	
September 17, 2022	"After Like"	Ive	2	
October 1, 2022	"Shut Down"	Blackpink	3	
October 22, 2022	"Hype Boy"	NewJeans	2	
November 4, 2022	"Nxde"	(G)I-dle	2	
November 19, 2022	"Event Horizon"	Younha	6	
December 31, 2022	"Ditto"	NewJeans	6	
January 21, 2023	"OMG"	NewJeans	9	
April 15, 2023	"Flower"	Jisoo	1	
April 22, 2023	"I Am"	Ive	8	
May 20, 2023	"Unforgiven"	Le Sserafim	1	
June 3, 2023	"Queencard"	(G)I-dle	4	
July 22, 2023	"Super Shy"	NewJeans	1	
July 29, 2023	"Seven"	Jungkook featuring Latto	12	
October 21, 2023	"You & Me"	Jennie	1	
October 28, 2023	"Do or Die"	Lim Young-woong	15	
February 10, 2024	"Love Wins All"	IU	2	
February 24, 2024	"Do or Die"	Lim Young-Woong	1	
March 2, 2024	"Bam Yang Gang"	Bibi	3	
March 30, 2024	"Fate"	(G)I-dle	2	
April 13, 2024	"Magnetic"	Illit	4	
May 11, 2024	"Spot!"	Zico featuring Jennie	3	
June 1, 2024	"Supernova"	Aespa	8	
July 6, 2024	"Small Girl"	Lee Young-ji featuring Doh Kyung-soo	3	
July 27, 2024	"Supernatural"	NewJeans	2	
August 31, 2024	"Home"	Lim Young-woong	1	
September 7, 2024	"Pump Up the Volume!"	Plave	4	
October 5, 2024	"Happy"	Day6	1	
October 12, 2024	"My Name Is Malguem"	QWER	2	
October 26, 2024	"Up"	Karina	1	
November 2, 2024	"Apt."	Rosé and Bruno Mars	5	
December 7, 2024	"Home Sweet Home"	G-Dragon featuring Taeyang and Daesung	7	

== Song milestones ==
=== Most weeks at number one ===
No. of weeks	Song	Artist	Release year
16	"Do or Die"	Lim Young-woong	2023
12	"Seven"	Jungkook featuring Latto	2023
9	"OMG"	NewJeans	2023
8	"I Am"	Ive	2023
8	"Supernova"	Aespa	2024
7	"Home Sweet Home"	G-Dragon featuring Taeyang and Daesung	2024
6	"Event Horizon"	Younha	2022
6	"Ditto"	NewJeans	2022

== Artist milestones ==
=== Most number-one songs ===
No. of songs	Artist	Songs
6	NewJeans	"Attention" "Hype Boy" "Ditto" "OMG" "Super Shy" "Supernatural"
4	(G)I-dle	"Tomboy" "Nxde" "Queencard" "Fate"
3	Ive	"Love Dive" "After Like" "I Am"
2	Blackpink	"Pink Venom" "Shut Down"
2	Jennie	"You & Me" "Spot!"
2	Aespa	"Girls" "Supernova"

=== Most weeks at number one ===
No. of weeks	Artist	Songs
21	NewJeans	"Attention" (2 weeks) "Hype Boy" (2 weeks) "Ditto" (6 weeks) "OMG" (9 weeks) "Super Shy" (1 week) "Supernatural" (1 week)
17	Lim Young-Woong	"Do or Die" (16 weeks) "Home" (1 week)
13	Ive	"Love Dive" (3 weeks) "After Like" (2 weeks) "I Am" (8 weeks)
12	Jungkook	"Seven" (12 weeks)
12	Latto	"Seven" (12 weeks)
12	(G)I-dle	"Tomboy" (4 weeks) "Nxde" (2 weeks) "Queencard" (4 weeks) "Fate" (2 weeks)
