= Han Sangcheol =

South Korean musician (born 1983)

- Born: 1983 (age 41–42)
- Origin: South Korea
- Genres: Noise rock; shoegaze; indie rock; post-rock
- Years active: 2005–present
- Labels: Beatball Music
- Member of: Bulssazo

Han Sangcheol (Korean: 한상철) is a South Korean musician, music critic and columnist. He is the guitarist of the band Bulssazo. He also works a columnist at the Korea Policy Briefing, a news website run by Ministry of Culture, Sports and Tourism.

== Career ==
Han Sangcheol began his music in 2005 with the band Bulssazo, and the band released four studio albums. He is known as a musician who sticks analog releases, and the band's third studio album released only on cassette tapes. He said in an interview, "Bulssazo's music is divided between likes and dislikes, so this is why we only released it with cassette tapes in the sense that only those who really want to listen to it should listen to it even if it's hard."

He wrote the Korean version of the album liner notes for various artists, including The Go! Team's Proof of Youth, John Mayer's Born and Raised, and The xx's I See You, and worked as a pop columnist and music critic. He is currently writing as a professional columnist at Korea Policy Briefing.

In 2023, he released his first solo studio album Sous le Soleil de Satan (사탄의 태양 아래). He supported 250's concerts.

== Discography ==
=== Studio albums ===
- Sous le Soleil de Satan (사탄의 태양 아래) (2023)
