= E Sens =

South Korean rapper (born 1987)

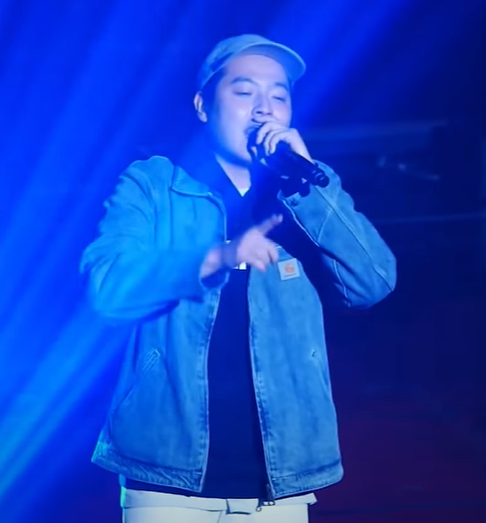
- Esens in 2017

Background information
- Also known as: Blanky Munn
- Born: Kang Min-ho; 9 February 1987 (age 38); Daegu, South Korea
- Genres: Hip hop
- Occupation: Rapper
- Years active: 2003–present
- Labels: Amoeba Culture; Beasts And Natives Alike

Korean name
- Hangul: 강민호
- Hanja: 姜閔浩
- RR: Gang Minho
- MR: Kang Minho

Kang Min-ho (Korean: 강민호; born 9 February 1987), better known by the stage name E Sens (Korean: 이센스), is a South Korean rapper. He debuted in 2009 as a member of the hip hop duo Supreme Team, which disbanded in 2013. In 2015, he released his first solo album, The Anecdote, which won Album of the Year at the 2016 Korean Music Awards. He released his second album, The Stranger, in 2019.

== Early life ==
E Sens was born on 9 February 1987 in Daegu, South Korea. He was 9 years old when his father died, and he dropped out of high school when he was 17. He became interested in hip hop at that time and chose the name E Sens, which is a shortened version of "Essayistic Sense".

== Career ==
=== 2002–2007: Underground beginnings ===
In 2002, E Sens won a rap contest in Daegu, where he caught the attention of Minos, then a member of the hip hop team Virus. E Sens soon starting performing alongside Virus and other rappers in Daegu in a regular series of concerts called the "Hip-Hop Train" project. In 2004, he released his debut mini-album, Uncut, Pure!, a collaboration with rapper Planet Black.

E Sens garnered more attention in the hip hop community in 2007 when he featured on the song, "지켜볼게" by Paloalto and The Quiett. His popularity continued to increase with the single, "꽐라", which appeared on the Jiggy Fellaz compilation album Xclusive.

=== 2007–2013: Mixtapes and Supreme Team ===
E Sens released his first mix tape, Blanky Munn's Unknown Verses, in 2007. Soon after, he signed a contract with record label Amoeba Culture as a member of the duo Supreme Team with Simon Dominic. Before the duo's debut, he released his second mix tape, New Blood, Rapper Vol.1, in 2008, which also garnered much attention from the Korean hip-hop community. The following year, E Sens became a member of Illest Konfusion, a hip hop crew that included Simon Dominic, Beenzino, and Swings. Supreme Team debuted the same year with the mini-album, Supreme Team Guide To Excellent Adventure. The duo went on to achieve critical success, winning Best New Male Group at the 2009 Mnet Asian Music Awards and the Hip Hop Award at the 2010 Golden Disk Awards.

=== 2013–present: Solo career and drug charges ===
In July 2013, E Sens opted not to renew his contract with Amoeba Culture and left the label as well as Supreme Team. Both he and Simon Dominic announced they would pursue solo careers. Shortly after leaving the label, E Sens released a song called "You Can't Control Me", which attacked the label and one of its founders, Gaeko of the hip hop group Dynamic Duo. The song led to an outbreak of diss tracks in the Korean hip hop community, with Swings, Gaeko, and Simon Dominic all weighing in on their own response songs by the end of the summer.

In 2014, E Sens joined the agency Beasts and Natives Alike and released "I'm Good", his first solo single following Supreme Team's break up. Soon after, he starred in his own internet reality show, also called I'm Good.

E Sens was arrested for marijuana use for a third time in April 2015, violating his probation period after previously being arrested in 2012. He was sentenced to a year and six months in jail in July. A month later, he became the first Korean rapper to release an album from jail with The Anecdote. The album was a success, garnering unprecedented pre-sale orders and winning both Album of the Year and Best Rap & Hip Hop Album at the 2016 Korean Music Awards.

== Discography ==
=== Studio albums ===
Title	Album details	Peak chart positions	Sales
Title	Album details	KOR	Sales
The Anecdote	Released: 27 August 2015; Label: Beasts And Natives Alike; Format: CD, LP, digital download	2	KOR: 20,284
The Stranger	Released: 22 July 2019; Label: Beasts And Natives Alike; Format: CD, digital download	4	KOR: 16,245
Moneybox (저금통)	Released: 13 July 2023; Label: Munn Company; Format: CD, digital download	14	KOR: 23,601
The Anecdote 10th Anniversary Special Edition	Released: 2 September 2025; Label: E Sens, Kakao Entertainment; Format: CD, digital download, streaming	29	KOR: 8,000

== Awards ==
=== Korean Music Awards ===
Year	Category	Nominated work	Result	Ref
2016	Album of the Year	The Anecdote	Won	
2016	Best Rap & Hip Hop Album	The Anecdote	Won	
2016	Best Rap & Hip Hop Song	The Anecdote	Nominated	
2020	Best Rap & Hip Hop Album	The Stranger	Nominated	
2020	Best Rap & Hip Hop Song	Son of A	Won	
2024	Best Rap & Hip Hop Song	What The Hell	Won	
