= Oohyo =

South Korean indie pop singer

- Born: Woo Hyo-eun; March 20, 1993 (age 33)
- Origin: South Korea
- Genres: Synth-pop, indie pop
- Occupation: Singer
- Years active: 2014–present
- Label: Enough Enough (Enough Enough)
- Website: www.enoughx2.com

Korean name
- Hangul: 우효은
- RR: U Hyoeun
- MR: U Hyoŭn

Woo Hyo-eun (Korean: 우효은), better known as Oohyo (Korean: 우효), is a South Korean synth-pop singer. She has released three extended plays, Girl Sense (2014), Silence (2020), and Oohyo Returns (2023); and two full-length albums, Adventure (2015), Far From the Madding City (2019).

== Career ==
Oohyo spent her childhood abroad and debuted in May 2014 with her first EP, Girl Sense. The EP included songs she wrote during her high school years, and 5 out of 8 songs are in English. She has attracted international attention as a rising synth pop musician. Returning to Korea after college, she released her first full-length album, Adventure, in October 2015. Again a mix of songs performed in Korean and English, the album was nominated for three awards in the 13th Korean Music Awards in 2016. She released her second studio album, Far from the Madding City, in April 2019. This album contains collaborations with other artists such as starRo.

== Discography ==
=== Studio albums ===
Title	Album details	Peak chart positions	Sales
Title	Album details	KOR	Sales
Adventure (어드벤처)	Released: October 7, 2015; Label: Mirrorball Music; Formats: CD, digital download	24	KOR: 838
Far From the Madding City (성난 도시로부터 멀리)	Released: April 8, 2019; Label: Mun Hwa In, kakao M; Formats: CD, digital download	23	KOR: 2,337

=== Extended plays ===
Title	EP details	Peak chart positions
Title	EP details	KOR
Girl Sense (소녀감성)	Released: May 15, 2014; Label: Mirrorball Music; Formats: CD, digital download	29
Silence	Released: October 8, 2020; Label: Mun Hwa In, kakao M; Formats: CD, digital download	47
Oohyo Returns (돌아온 우효)	Released: October 23, 2023; Label: Mirrorball Music; Formats: CD, digital download	—

=== Singles ===
Title	Year	Peak chart positions	Album
Title	Year	KOR	Album
As lead artist
"Vineyard" (빈야드)	2014	—	Girl Sense
"Friday" (금요일) (feat. Philtre)	2015	—	Non-album single
"K-Drama" (K드라마)	2015	—	Adventure
"Perhaps Maybe" (아마도 우린)	2015	—	Adventure
"Youth (Day)" (청춘 (Day))	2016	— (Note: "Youth (Day)" did not enter the Circle Digital Chart, but it peaked at number 98 on the component Download Chart.)	Non-album single
"Pizza"	2017	— (Note: "Pizza" did not enter the Circle Digital Chart, but it peaked at number 97 on the component Download Chart.)	Far From the Madding City
"Dandelion" (민들레)	2017	49	Non-album singles
"Honey Tea" (꿀차)	2018	— (Note: "Honey Tea" did not enter the Circle Digital Chart, but it peaked at number 70 on the component Download Chart.)	Non-album singles
"Papercut"	2018	—	Non-album singles
"Tennis" (테니스)	2019	—	Far From the Madding City
"Bunny Mask" (토끼탈)	2019	—	Far From the Madding City
"Butter Chicken" (뻔한 치킨)	2019	—	Non-album single
"Brave"	2020	—	Far From the Madding City
"2020"	2020	—	Silence
"Enough"	2020	—	Silence
"Everlasting God" (새 힘 얻으리)	2021	—	Non-album singles
"Cupid's Arrow" (당신은 어디에)	2021	—	Non-album singles
"Sand" (모래)	2022	—	Non-album singles
"Honey Tea Returns" (돌아온 꿀차)	2023	—	Non-album singles
"Teddy Bear Returns" (돌아온 Teddy Bear)	2023	—	Oohyo Returns
"Perhaps Maybe Returns" (돌아온 아마도우린)	2023	—	Oohyo Returns
As featured artist
"45.7cm" (선) (Yoo Seung-woo feat. Oohyo)	2016	21	Pit a Pat
"Call Center" (콜센터) (Jerry.K feat. Oohyo)	2016	—	Emotional Labor
"Thoughts at the Dawn" (새벽에 든 생각) (PPCX feat. Oohyo)	2016	—	1999
"With the Star" (Bronze with Oohyo)	2019	—	East Shore
"Afterlife" (Spacecowboy feat. Oohyo)	2021	—	Non-album single
"Douce Cassette" (Blossom Club feat. Oohyo)	2023	—	Virtuality

=== Soundtrack appearances ===
Title	Year	Album
"Downpour" (소나기)	2017	Stranger OST
"While Living Life" (사노라면)	2020	Hospital Playlist OST
"Walk Slow"	2023	Call It Love OST

== Awards and nominations ==
Year	Award	Category	Nominated work	Result	Ref.
2016	Korean Music Awards	Best New Artist	Adventure	Nominated	
2016	Korean Music Awards	Best Dance & Electronic Album	Adventure	Nominated	
2016	Korean Music Awards	Best Dance & Electronic Song	"K-Drama"	Nominated	
