= XXX (group) =

South Korean hip hop duo

- Genres: Hip hop; IDM
- Years active: 2016–present
- Label: Beasts And Natives Alike (BANA)
- Members: FRNK; Kim Ximya
- Website: beastsandnatives.com

XXX is a South Korean hip hop duo consisting of rapper Kim Ximya (Kim Dong-hyun) and producer FRNK (Park Jin-su).

== Career ==
Kim Ximya, whose real name is Kim Dong-hyun, met FRNK (Park Jin-su) in an online amateur music community and formed the group after discovering the latter's musical work.

Described as an experimental hip hop group, they released their debut seven-song EP Kyomi on July 9, 2016. XXX's debut studio album, Language, was released on November 28, 2018. Their musical style is described as "dark hip-hop with a frenetic electro edge."

== Discography ==
=== Studio albums ===
Title	Album details	Peak chart positions	Sales
Title	Album details	KOR	Sales
Language	Released: November 28, 2018; Label: Beasts And Natives Alike; Format: Digital download, streaming, CD	30	KOR: 2,000+
Second Language	Released: February 15, 2019; Label: Beasts And Natives Alike; Format: Digital download, streaming, CD	29	KOR: 2,450+

=== Extended plays ===
Title	Album details	Peak chart positions	Sales
Title	Album details	KOR	Sales
Kyomi	Released: July 9, 2016; Label: Beasts And Natives Alike; Format: Digital download, streaming, CD	16	KOR: 1,080+

== Awards and nominations ==
=== Korean Hip-hop Awards ===
Year	Category	Nominated work	Result	Ref.
2017	New Artist of the Year	—N/a	Nominated	
2019	Hip Hop Album of the Year	Language	Won	
2019	Hip Hop Song of the Year	"Sujak" (수작)	Nominated	

=== Korean Music Awards ===
Year	Category	Nominated work	Result	Ref.
2019	Best Rap and Hip Hop Song	“Ganju Gok” (간주곡)	Won	
2019	Best Rap and Hip Hop Album	Language	Nominated	
