= Rhythmer =

South Korean online magazine

- Website type: Online magazine
- Available in: Korean
- Owner: Kang Il-Kwon
- Creator: Kang Il-Kwon
- Website: rhythmer.net
- Launched: 2001
- Current status: Active

Rhythmer (Korean: 리드머) is a South Korean online magazine that publishes hip hop music reviews, articles, and interviews with artists. The magazine was founded in 2001 by Kang Il-kwon, a hip-hop and R&B critic who is also a judge of the Korean Music Awards. They are regarded as the almost only official hip-hop critic website in South Korea.
