= Choi Jung-hoon =

South Korean singer and songwriter (born 1992)

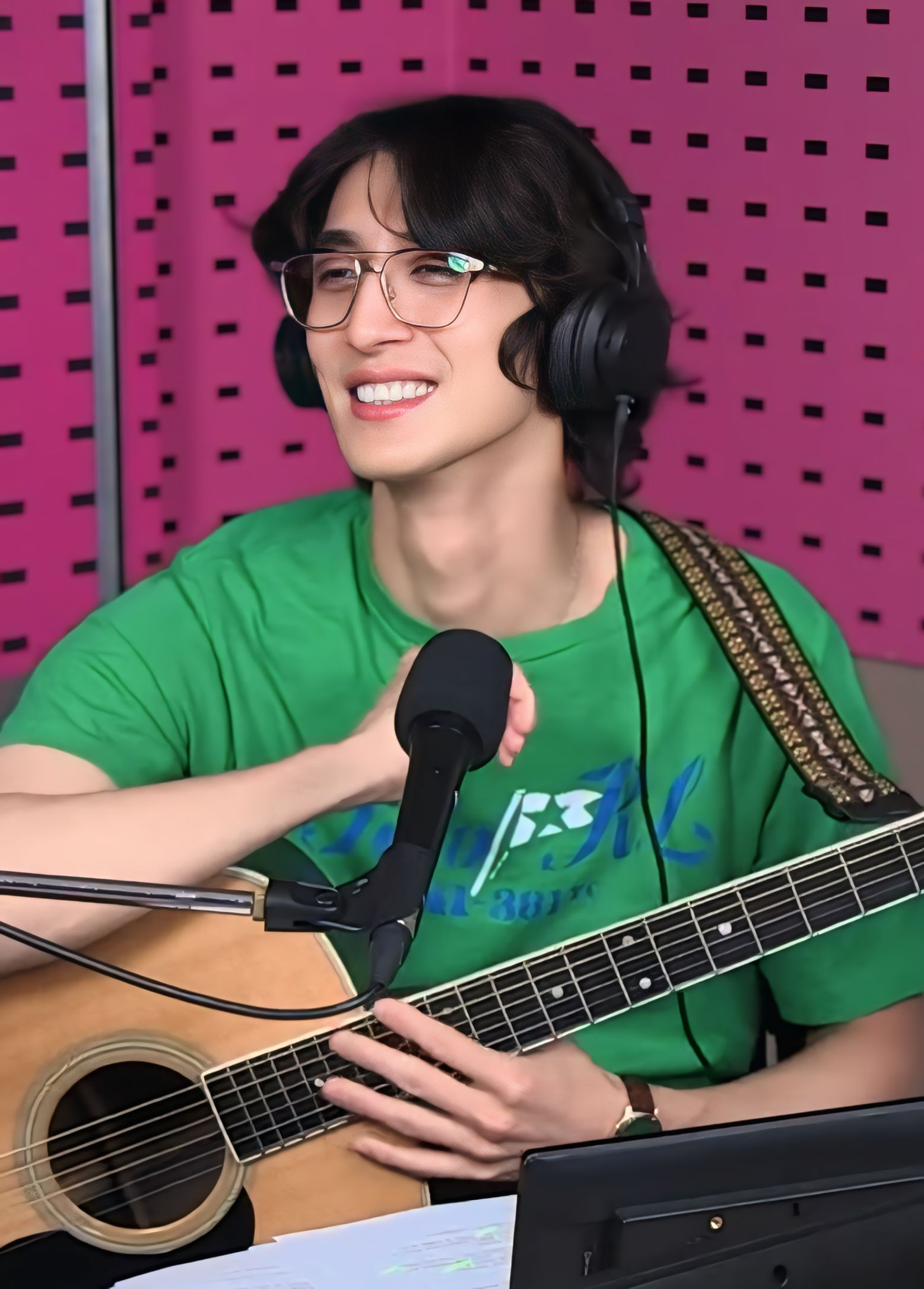
- Choi in 2022
- Born: March 10, 1992 (age 34); Bundang, South Korea
- Education: Kyung Hee University (Department of Business Administration)
- Occupations: Musician; singer-songwriter; record producer
- Years active: 2012–present
- Works: Jannabi discography; Solo discography
- Musical career
- Genres: Indie rock; indie pop; modern rock; folk rock
- Instruments: Vocals; guitar; piano
- Label: Peponi Music
- Member of: Jannabi

Korean name
- Hangul: 최정훈
- Hanja: 崔正勳
- RR: Choe Jeonghun
- MR: Ch'oe Chŏnghun

Choi Jung-hoon (Korean: 최정훈; born March 10, 1992) is a South Korean musician, singer-songwriter, and record producer. He is best known as the frontman, primary songwriter, and record producer of the indie rock duo Jannabi.

== Early life and education ==
Choi Jung-hoon was born on March 10, 1992, in Bundang, Seongnam, Gyeonggi Province. His family consists of his parents and an older brother. He spent his childhood and school days in Bundang's academy district called "Dolmaro" (he would go on to write the lyrics of the song Dolmaro in Jannabi's Legend album). He attended Bundang Elementary School, Seohyun Middle School, and Yatap High School.

Choi displayed interest and talent in music from an early age. Since fifth grade, he has liked writing essays and lyrics. Under the influence of his mother, he often listened to and performed songs by Sanullim, Elton John, and The Beatles, which were different from the likes of his peers. Although he was good at music, he dreamed of becoming a professional soccer player. However, Elton John's concert in South Korea and his poster advertisement that said "the best singer-songwriter in the world" left a deep impression on Choi. He thought that being a singer-songwriter was "the coolest job" after hearing his mother's explanation of the term, which inspired him to become such.

In his middle and high school years, Choi started listening to Korean indie music such as The Black Skirts and 10cm then met his future Jannabi bandmates Jang Kyung-joon and Kim Do-hyung, and they would regularly perform at Bundang Central Park. He also served as the student council's president and reportedly ranked 8th in the entire school. Following graduation, he gained admission to Kyung Hee University, where he majored in business administration, but decided to take a year off from college to pursue music. He trained at FNC Entertainment, nearly debuting as a member of N.Flying, but decided to leave after realizing his creativity was restricted by the agency and he had a different musical style from the group.

== Career ==
=== 2012–present: Jannabi ===
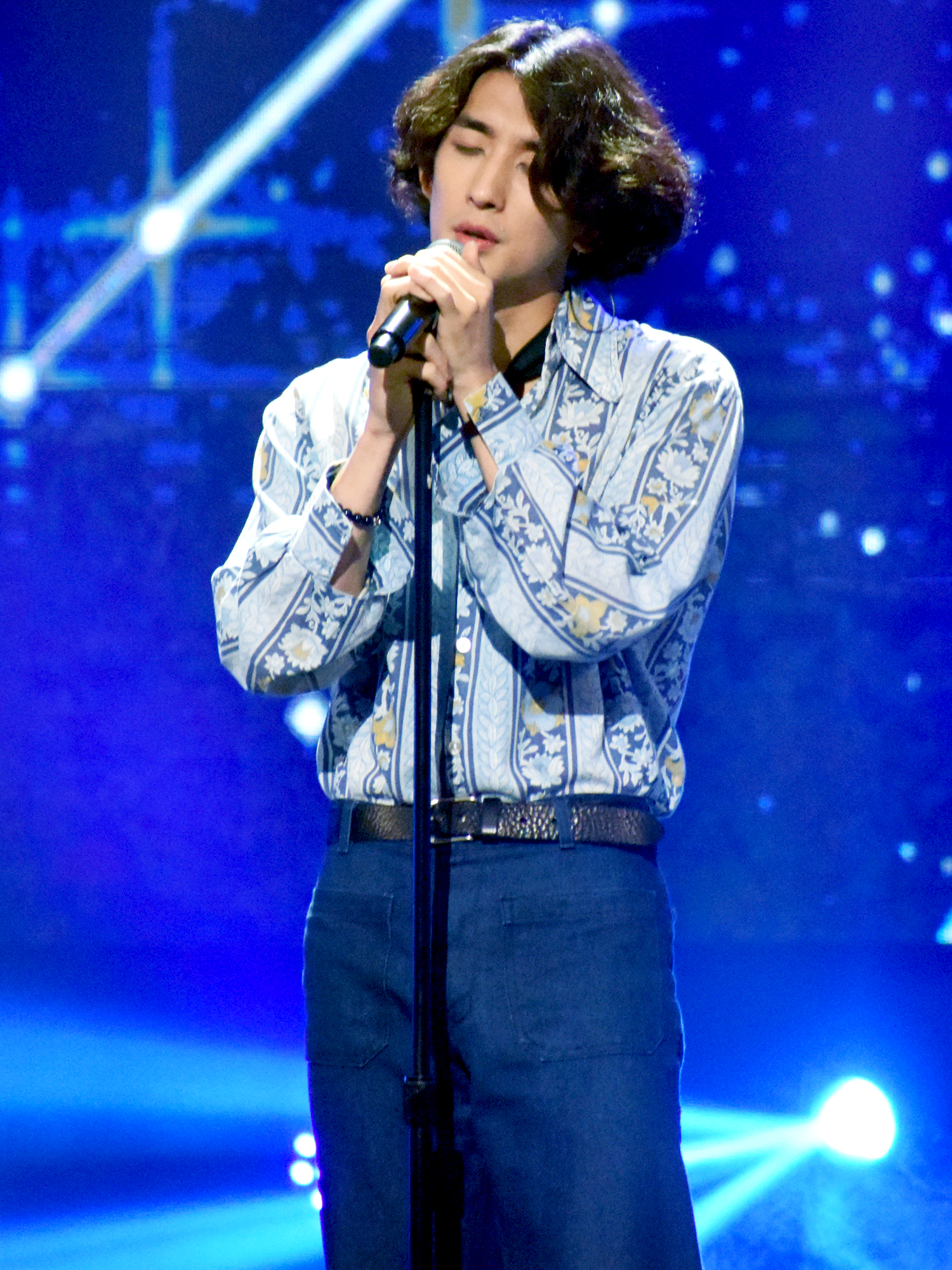
Choi Jung-hoon performing at the 2018 Indiestance Final Concert

In 2012, Jannabi was formed under an independent record label, Peponi Music, established and headed by Choi's older brother, Choi Jung-jun. The band started from scratch, performing on clubs and busking on the streets of Hongdae and Insa-dong.

In August 2013, Jannabi auditioned for the fifth season of the survival audition show Superstar K to make their band known. While Kim and Yoo Young-hyun were eliminated, Choi continued to participate as a member of the newly created vocalist group Plan B. Plan B was later eliminated, reaching the Top 7 Qualifying Round.

On April 28, 2014, Choi officially made his debut as a member of Jannabi with the release of the single Rocket. In the same year, the band has continued to release digital singles November Rain and Pole Dance, its first extended play (EP), See Your Eyes, and several original sound tracks for Korean television dramas.

On August 4, 2016, Jannabi released its first studio album, Monkey Hotel.

In 2019, Jannabi created an unprecedented sensation after releasing their second studio album Legend with the title track "For Lovers Who Hesitate," which reached number one on the Circle Digital Chart in May 2025 and continues to appear on the music charts in South Korea to this day with a triple platinum for streaming certification by the Korea Music Content Association. Aside from all the other songs in the album charting, their previously released songs simultaneously charted on the Circle Digital Chart and Billboard K-Pop Hot 100.

On November 6, 2020, Choi and Kim continued to record as a duo and released their second EP, Jannabi's Small Pieces I, with the title song "A thought on an autumn night." The title track ranked first on various music charts in South Korea, such as Bugs, Genie, and Vibe.

On July 18, 2021, despite Kim and Jang being on a hiatus due to military service, Choi continued to promote the band with session musicians, releasing their third studio album, The Land of Fantasy.

On May 10, 2022, Choi released Jannabi's third EP, Jannabi's Small Pieces II: Grippin'TheGreen, with all tracks written and produced by him. He revealed that the album was filled with "songs made at home, in the afternoon, mostly while looking out the window," with Choi hoping that listeners would listen to the EP like that as well. The EP's lead single "Grippin'TheGreen," ranked first on the Bugs! and quickly entered the Top 100 of the Genie and Melon music charts.

=== 2018–present: Solo activities ===
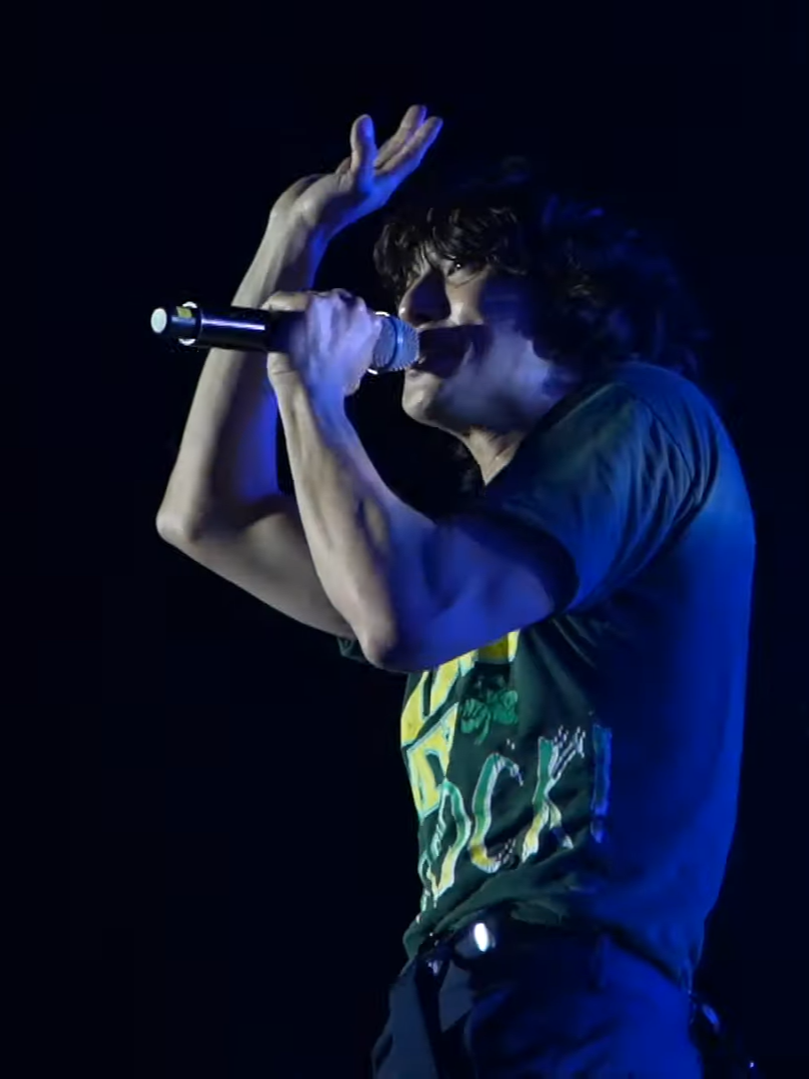
Choi Jung-hoon performing at the Sungkyunkwan University Festival in May 2024

In 2018, Choi participated in the song "Lilac" from Changmo's EP The Moment of Contact. In December 2018, Choi competed on King of Mask Singer under the name "Ginger Man," appearing in episodes 183 and 184.

In 2019, following Jannabi's rise to fame, Choi appeared on various television shows, including KBS' In Sync, where vocalists try to find their perfect match to do a duet, the social commentary talk show Hello Counselor, and MBC's I Live Alone, where he particularly gained attention by revealing his daily life.

In 2020, Choi participated in the 28th anniversary project of the fashion magazine Elle Korea called "RECONNECT." It features the song "For the Gone," written and composed by him alongside Code Kunst and Simon Dominic.

In 2021, Choi appeared on Hangout with Yoo. In July, he participated in the song "Next Episode" from AKMU's EP of the same title. In October, he participated in the 25th anniversary tribute for punk rock band No Brain by remaking their song "Midnight Music," a track from No Brain's 5th album That is Youth (2007).

In 2022, it was announced that Choi would join JTBC's music entertainment show Hot Singers as a music director alongside Kim Moon-jeong. The show centers on the journey of Korea's famous senior actors in singing songs together while telling the stories of their lives. He created the Korean language version of the song "This Is Me" which was performed by the choir at the 58th Baeksang Arts Awards to conclude the show. From April to May, he led a film photo exhibition called "Days of Future Passed" in collaboration with Allycamera. The exhibition follows Choi's daily life from morning to night, showcasing his point of view and his brother's photographic works. In May, he joined the two-track project of singer-songwriter Jo Dong-hee and composer Jo Dong-Ik by singing the song "Until I love the love." The song has an exquisite blend of understated acoustic melodies and electronic sounds that lead to a calm atmosphere. On September 23, Choi appeared as an original singer on the seventh season of Hidden Singer. The show's sixth episode introduced Jannabi as "the first place in festival recruitment." The episode ranked first in the same time slot, and Choi took sixth place in the overall ranking of entertainment performers. On September 26, a song collaboration "Because We Loved" with Kang Min-kyung was released, ranking first on various music charts such as Bugs! and Genie.

In 2023, Choi became an official member of the Korea Music Copyright Association. In March, Choi starred on SBS' variety show No Math School Trip, directed by Running Man's former director, Choi Bo Pil, alongside Doh Kyung-soo, Zico, Crush, Yang Se-chan, and Lee Yong-jin. From May to August, Choi hosted the second season of KBS late-night music talk show The Seasons: Choi Jung-hoon's Night Park. Choi received the Excellence Award in Show and Variety Category at the 2023 KBS Entertainment Awards for this.

== Artistry ==
=== Musical style and influences ===
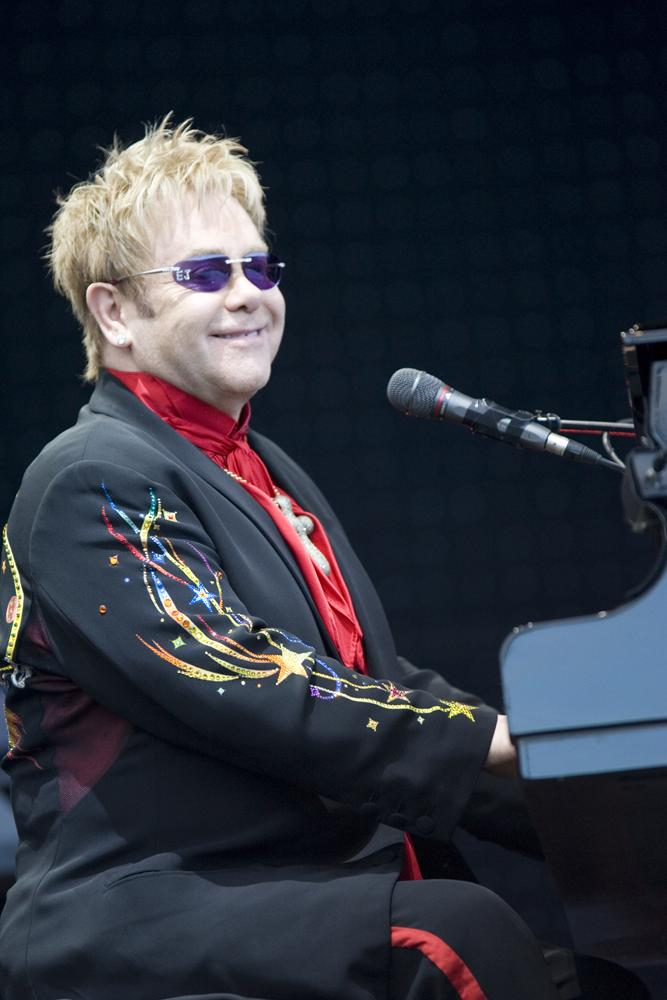
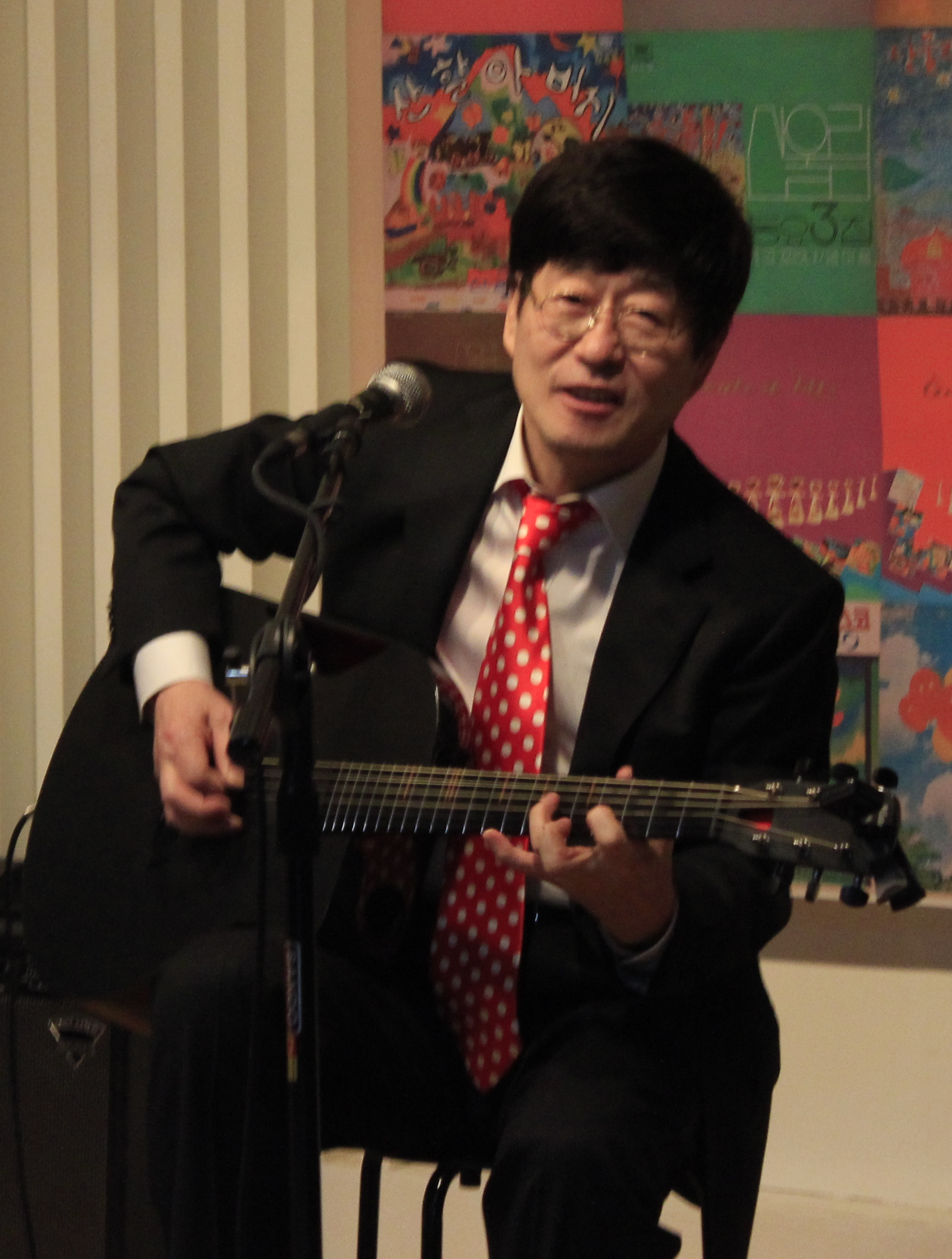
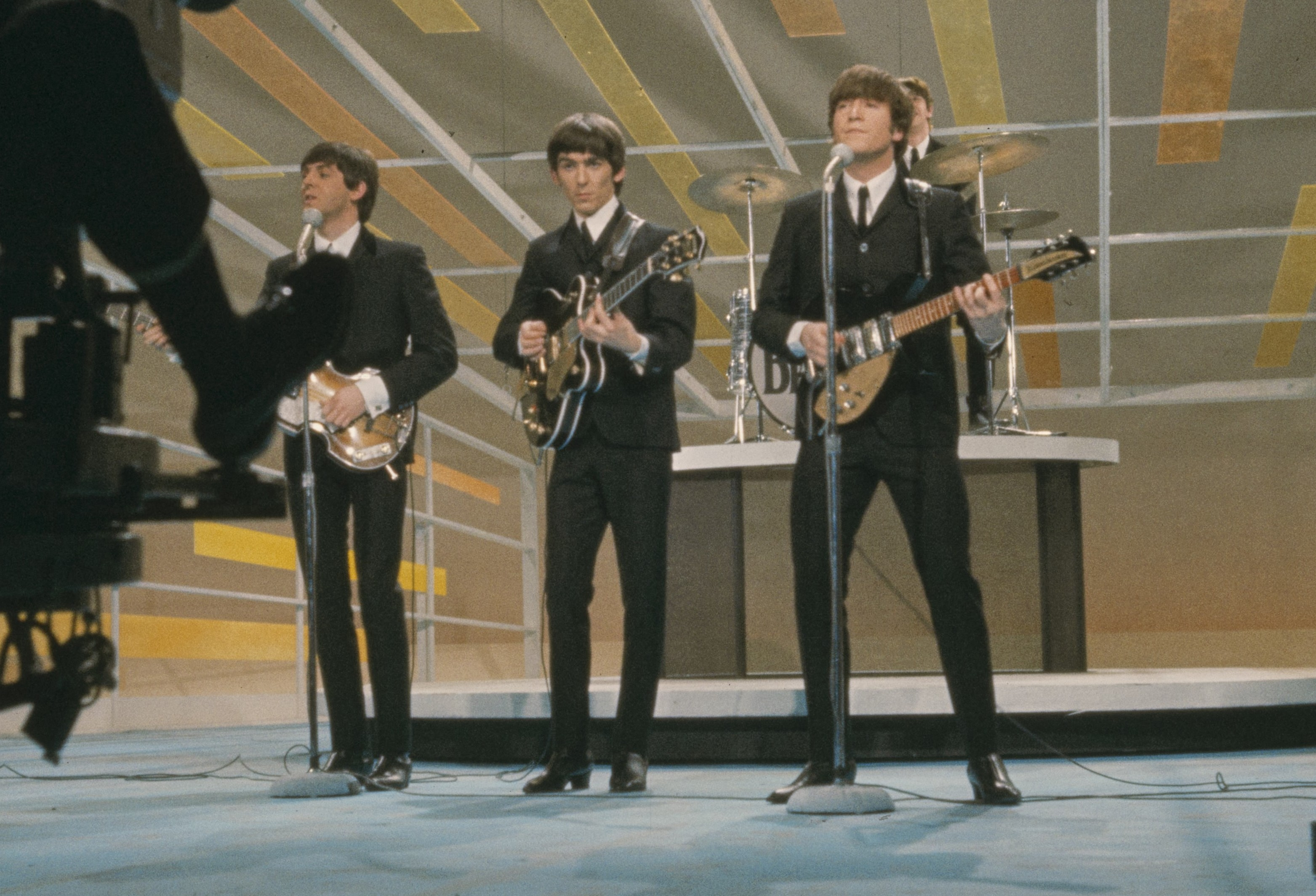
Artists such as Elton John, Sanullim, and The Beatles have influenced Choi

Choi has been described as an unrivaled "emotional craftsman" of his generation. He is an all-round musician who writes, composes, arranges, and produces Jannabi's songs and a number of addictive radio logo songs. He also manages all aspects related to Jannabi's performances and albums. He plays various instruments but mainly uses an acoustic guitar and musical keyboard. Choi cited artists he grew up listening to, such as Elton John, Sanullim, and The Beatles as his biggest musical influences. He explored a wide array of genres, including folk, ballad, progressive rock, and chamber pop, with the intricate use of string orchestra and choir. In addition, he reads a lot of books, particularly poetry collections, as inspirations for his musical style. One of the examples of songs that drew inspiration from a poem was Jannabi's "I Know Where the Rainbow Has Fallen," in which the lyrics 'lonely island romantic' were quoted from Jeong Ji-yong's poem entitled "News of May."

=== Songwriting ===
Over 100 registered songs are credited to Choi by the Korea Music Copyright Association. In February 2023, he was promoted to a regular member of the KMCA, recognizing the songs he has produced. The most notable aspect of his songwriting is his ability to incorporate literary rhetoric. Popular music critic Kim Sung-dae praised his lyrics stating: "Based on positivity and harmony, Choi puts fantasy and imagination, moments of life, people and love, society and era images in the lyrics without distinction between written/colloquial and semi-formal/polite speech style. The inner monologue that only one person knew resonated with many people, and their emotional support ultimately led to who Jannabi is today. Trying to approach listeners somehow without pretense, he has written his own story by destroying his ego more fiercely than anyone else." So Seung-geun of IZM recognized his ability to write warm melody and candid lyrics like a diary. As he shared during his appearance in KBS' Stopping on the Road Once in a While, "When I write lyrics, I felt that it would be really nice if someone could feel it as much as my emotions, so I am grateful (for empathizing)."

=== Vocal ===
Choi was known for his vocal range. Popular music critics Jung Min-jae and Kim Seong-hwan noted his unrivaled expressive power with "the charm of dramatic vocals like flowing water." Described as an unlearned vocalist, critics and listeners characterized his voice with a unique husky tone and personality that does not use standard singing methods, possessing a "vintage voice reminiscent of the old times."

== Other ventures ==
=== Endorsements ===
In September 2021, Choi was chosen as the model for the fall and winter sneaker collection of Umbro, themed "Heritage of Passion."

In May 2022, Choi became the endorser of Sennheiser's Momentum True Wireless 3 earbuds. In July 2022, Choi and Ahn Seul-ki served as the brand ambassadors for the ad campaign "Runners Helping Runners" by Nike. Choi has also been selected by Shinsegae International as the menswear brand ambassador of Studio Tomboy (2022–2023).

In 2024, Kooksoondang has selected Choi as the brand ambassador for the representative traditional liquor brand Bekseju.

=== Philanthropy ===
Choi has regularly donated the band's festival appearance fees for scholarships, school development, and educational environment improvement. In 2022, his donation provided free meals for 1,500 university students.

== Personal life ==
=== Military exemption ===
Choi was exempted from mandatory military service by the Military Manpower Administration due to a rupture of the anterior cruciate ligament while playing soccer in the past.

=== Relationship ===
On August 8, 2024, it was reported that after participating in KBS2's music talk show The Seasons: Choi Jung Hoon's Night Park in August 2023, Choi and actress Han Ji-min stayed in contact and developed a romantic relationship. Both of their agencies confirmed that the two are dating.

== Discography ==
=== Singles ===
Title	Year	Peak chart positions		Album
Title	Year	KOR	KOR Hot	Album
As lead artist
"For the Gone" (사라진 모든 것들에게) (with Code Kunst and Simon Dominic)	2020	106	—N/a	Non-album singles
"Midnight Music" (한밤의 뮤직)	2021	—	—N/a	Non-album singles
"Until I Love the Love" (사랑을 사랑하게 될 때까지)	2022	—	83	Non-album singles
"Because We Loved" (우린 그렇게 사랑해서) (with Kang Min-kyung)	2022	12	—N/a	Non-album singles
"Us Against World" (세상에 서투른 연인들의 노래) (with Kang Seung-won)	2023	—	—N/a	Non-album singles
As featured artist
"Lilac" (Changmo featuring Choi Jung-hoon of Jannabi)	2018	—	—N/a	The Moment of Contact
"Next Episode" (AKMU featuring Choi Jung-hoon of Jannabi)	2021	54	77	Next Episode
Compilation appearances
"For the Peace of All Mankind" (비긴어게인 오픈마이크) (with Lee Eun-mi)	2022	—	—N/a	Begin Again Open Mic
"Long Time Lovers" (아주 오래된 연인들) (with Lee Mu-jin)	2022	—	—N/a	You Hee-yeol's Sketchbook
"No One" (누구없소) (with Na Moon-hee)	2022	—	—N/a	Hot Singers
"Piano Man" (with Kim Moon-jeong)	2022	—	—N/a	Hot Singers
"One Fine Spring Day" (봄날은 간다) (with Kim Young-ok & Na Moon-hee)	2022	—	—N/a	Hot Singers
"—" denotes releases that did not chart.

== Filmography ==
=== Television shows ===
Year	Title	Role	Notes	Ref.
2013	Superstar K 5	Contestant	Reached the Top 7 Qualifying Round as part of Plan B	
2018	King of Mask Singer	Contestant	Episodes 183–184 as "Ginger Man"	
2019	In Sync	Cast Member	—N/a	
2021–22	Immortal Songs: Singing the Legend	Performer	Episodes 509, 547, 553, 567	
2022	Hot Singers	Cast Member	Music Director	
2022	Hidden Singer	Contestant; Highlight Artist	Eliminated in Round 3; later appeared as a panelist	
2023	Begin Again – Intermission	Cast Member	Spin-off	
2023	No Math School Trip	Cast Member	—N/a	
2023	The Seasons: Choi Jung-hoon's Night Park	Host	Season 2	
2023	The Black Box on Earth	Cast Member	Episode 1. Ice becomes Ocean <Antarctica & East Sea>	
2024	Masterpiece	Highlight Artist	This is EBS Space Sympathy's special documentary to mark its 20th anniversary. The second episode's focus is Jannabi's 2nd Album, Legend.	
2025	Hangout with Yoo	Contestant	'80s MBC Seoul Song Festival	

=== Web shows ===
Year	Title	Notes	Ref.
2021	Begin Again Open Mic	Spin-off; Appeared on January 31, February 7, 14, 21, and 28	
2022	Differential Class All Night Talk	Four Episodes	

=== Radio shows ===
Year	Title	Notes	Ref.
2021	STATION Z	DJ	
2021	This Beautiful Morning, This Is Kim Chang-wan	Special DJ	
2022	Bae Cheol-soo's Music Camp	Special DJ	

=== Music videos ===
Title	Year	Director(s)	Notes	Ref.
"Summer" (뜨거운 여름밤은 가고 남은 건 볼품없지만)	2016	Lee Rae-kyung (BEHIND THE SCENES)	Jannabi made cameo	
"Help"	2017	Lee Rae-kyung (BEHIND THE SCENES)	Song by 10cm; Choi was featured	
"She"	2017	Unknown	Performance version	
"Good Boy Twist" (굿보이 트위스트)	2018	Minju Kim, Dongseob Lim (96WAVE)		
"Made In Christmas"	2018	Minju Kim, Dongseob Lim (96WAVE)		
"The King Of Romance" (로맨스의 왕)	2021	Oh Yumi	Released for Customellow Music Project	
"Summerfallwinter Spring." (여름가을겨울 봄.)	2022	SOZE YOON	Choi made cameo	
"Drop The Beat" (드랍 더 빛고을)	2022	Unknown	Released to promote Buskers World Cup in Gwangju	
"Coloring Your Face"	2023	JTBC Brand Department; Executive Producer: Kim Hyejin; Creative Director: Lee Jounghoon	Released for JTBC new brand song	
"Pony"	2023	HOBIN	Released for Hyundai Heritage Music Project	

=== Hosting ===
Year	Program	Notes	Ref.
2021	The Stage of Legends – Archive K	Special MC with Sung Si-kyung	
2021	Leto GV for Marie Claire Film Festival	Talk with Yoo Teo	

== Awards and nominations ==
Name of the award ceremony, year presented, category, nominee of the award, and the result of the nomination
Award ceremony	Year	Category	Nominee / Work	Result	Ref.
Seoul Music Awards	2023	Ballad Award	"Because We Loved" (with Kang Min-kyung)	Nominated	
KBS Entertainment Awards	2023	Excellence Award in Show and Variety Category	The Seasons	Won	
SBS Entertainment Awards	2023	Rookie Award in Talk and Variety Category	No Math School Trip	Nominated	
