= Alen Jelen =

Alen Jelen is Slovenian theatre director, radio director, dramaturge, actor in Ljubljana, Slovenia. He is born 1970 in Maribor and lives and works in Ljubljana.

== Career ==
During the 1995–1999 period, he participated with his acting performances in several pieces staged by Slovenian national theater Drama Maribor (SNG Maribor). He was a member of the Drama studio in SNG Maribor. After finishing his secondary schooling, he joined the Academy of Theatre, Radio Film and TV (AGRFT) in Ljubljana, from which he graduated in dramaturgy in 2000. For five years he worked as a freelancer in the sphere of culture. In 2001, he decided to return to the Academy, where he is about to complete his theatre and radio direction studies. For his graduation thesis, he has directed the theatre piece Nora Nora by Evald Flisar and radioplay Doctor Faust. Dramaturgist and director Alen Jelen is also highly active in The Slovenian Association of Dramatic Artists. He is Art Manager in the ŠKUC Theatre, Ljubljana.

=== Directions ===
radio play/radio drama

- 2019 Vinko Möderndorfer, Sisters, radio drama, Radio Slovenia
- 2019 Fran Levstik, Martin Krpan, Radio Slovenia
- 2018 Stefano Benni, Papa va in TV/Dady will be on TV, short radio drama, Radio Slovenia
- 2017 Simona Semenič, One thousand nine hundred eighty-one, Radio Slovenia
- 2016 Henrik Ibsen & Mateja Koležnik, John Gabriel Borkman, Radio Slovenia
- 2016 Saška Rakef, Mallet, Radio Slovenia
- 2015 Vinko Möderndorfer, Inspector Gaber- The farewell, crime – radio series, Radio Slovenia, 1 program
- 2015 Vinko Möderndorfer, Inspector Gaber- The Last selfie, crime – radio series, Radio Slovenia, 1 program
- 2015 Vinko Möderndorfer, Inspector Gaber- The debt, crime – radio series, Radio Slovenia, 1 program
- 2015 Saška Rakef, Mallet, Play for radio and theater, Radio Slovenia and Glej Theatre Ljubljana
- 2014 Marie Ndiaye, Hilda, radio drama, Radio Slovenia
- 2014 Saša Rakef, The fifth shift – For any price, Contact radio play, Radio Slovenia – 1 program
- 2014 Saša Rakef, The fifth shift – Legally already, but what is legitimate?, Contact radio play, Radio Slovenia – 1 program
- 2014 Saša Rakef, The fifth shift – The Matrix, Contact radio play, Radio Slovenia – 1 program
- 2014 Saša Rakef, The fifth shift – The right choice, Contact radio play, Radio Slovenia – 1 program
- 2014 Saša Rakef, The fifth shift – I spend playing time with my children or in a battle for my child, Contact radio play, Radio Slovenia
- 2014 Saša Rakef, The fifth shift – For pinch of salt, Contact radio play, Radio Slovenia – 1 program
- 2014, Cvetka Bevc, Ten 3, radio play, Radio Slovenia
- 2014 Cvetka Bevc, Ten 2, radio play, Radio Slovenia
- 2014 Cvetka Bevc, Ten 1, radio play, Radio Slovenia
- 2013 Tom D. Bidwell, Things to do before you died, Radio Slovenia
- 2013 Ivana Sajko, Saša Rakef, Women bomb, radio play, Radio Slovenia
- 2012 Marko Kurat, Happy man's shirt, radio play, Radio Slovenia
- 2012 Schmied Erhard, Hollywood Boulevard, radio play, Radio Slovenia
- 2012 Pernille Iversen, Experiment, short radio play, Radio Slovenia
- 2011 Jana Kolarič & Tatjana Kokalj, Who is fear afraid of?, radio play of children, Radio Slovenia
- 2011 Andrej Blatnik, Almost perfect evening, short radio play, Radio Slovenia
- 2011 Marie Ndiaye, Hilda, radio play, Radio Slovenia & Radio Maribor
- 2011 Suzana Tratnik, Have a nice day, radio play, Radio Slovenia
- 2011 Miomira Šegina, Drum fate, radio play, Radio Slovenia
- 2011 Zmago Frece, Alen Jelen, Sonja Strenar, Hunger, documentary radio play, Radio Slovenia
- 2010 Ingunn Anreassen, All of Daniel, radio play of children, Radio Slovenia
- 2010 Tanja Vihar, I'm not Maria, radio play, Radio Slovenia
- 2010 Philip Ridley – Gregor Fon, Vincent River, radio play, ŠKUC Theatre & Radio Slovenia
- 2010 Matjaž Briški, Raft or a ship of fools, radio play, Radio Slovenia
- 2010 Goran Vojnović, It's o.k., short radio play, Radio Slovenia
- 2009 Ana Kržišnik & others, Night in Ljubljana (about James Joyce in Ljubljana), documentary radio play, Radio Slovenia
- 2009 Ljudska-Gregor Fon, Why bean has a white belly?, radio play for children, Radio Slovenia
- 2008 Berta Bojetu Boeta, Seclusion, radio play for children, Radio Slovenia
- 2008 Janja Vidmar – Ana Kržišnik, You have no idea, radio play for children, Radio Slovenia
- 2008 John Scott – Vilma Štritof, Architect, radio play, Radio Slovenia
- 2007 Tone Čufar, Alen Jelen, Fiasco, radio play, Radio Slovenia
- 2007 Irena Androjna, Looking for the Ball and Teddy Bear, radio play for children, Radio Slovenia
- 2007 Saša Pavček, Aria, radio play, Radio Slovenia
- 2007 Vinko Möderndorfer, Love and Theatre, radio play, Radio Slovenia
- 2007 Klemenčič-Cvetko-Sitar Dr. Faust, radio play, Radio Slovenia

=== Theatre ===
- 2019/20 Saša Pavček, On the waves, Slovenian Permanent Theatre in Trieste, SKUC theatre
- 2018/19 Martin Sharman, Bent, ŠKUC Theatre, Cankarjev dom Ljubljana, Zavod Kolaz
- 2017/18 Jean M. Cocteau, Les Parents Terribles, Ljubljana City Theatre
- 2017/18 Florian Zeller, The Truth, Slovenian Permanent Theatre in Trieste
- 2016/17 Ingmar Villqist, Helver's Night, Presernovo Theater Kranj & ŠKUC gledališče
- 2015/16 Ludmila Razumovskaya, Dear Yelena Sergeevna, Slovenian national theater Nova Gorica
- 2015/16 Mattias Brunn, No Tears for Queers, ŠKUC Theatre and Cankarjev dom Ljubljana
- 2015/16 Daniel Glattauer, Every Seventh Wave, Presernovo Theater Kranj & Ptuj City Theatre
- 2014/15 Marie NDiaye, Hilda, Presernovo Theater Kranj & ŠKUC gledališče
- 2013/14 Viktorija Rangelova, Naked, Ljubljana City Theatre & ŠKUC Theatre
- 2012/13 Georges Feydeau, ''Do not walk quite naked'', Slovenian Permanent Theatre in Trieste
- 2012/13 John Patrick Shanley, Doubt: A Parable, Presernovo Theatre Kranj
- 2011/12 Daniel Glattauer-Ulrike Zemme, Gut gegen Nordwind (Love Virtually), Prešernovo Theatre Kranj in Ptuj City Theatre
- 2010/11 Tom Dalton Bidwell, Company along the Mile, Ljubljana City Theatre & ŠKUC Theatre
- 2010/11 Tamara Doneva, Mistery of women, ŠKUC Theatre
- 2008/09 Hávar Sigurjónsson, Our boy, ŠKUC Theatre & Glej Theatre
- 2008/09 Miha Mazzini, Flight to Rome, Ljubljana City Theatre & Glej Theatre
- 2007/08 Philip Ridley, Vincent River, ŠKUC Theatre & Glej Theatre
- 2006/07 Anton Tomaž Linhart, This Merry Day or Matiček is Getting Married, Tone Čufar Theatre, Jesenice
- 2006/07 Evald Flisar, Nora Nora, ŠKUC Theatre and AGRFT Ljubljana
- 2005/06 Nick Grosso, Peaches, ŠKUC Theatre and AGRFT Ljubljana
- 2005/06 Georges Feydeau, ''Hey, Cut out the Parading around Stark Naked'', Tone Čufar Theatre, Jesenice
- 2002/03 Edna Mazya, Games in the Backyard, ŠKUC Theatre
- 2002/03 Berta Bojetu Boeta, Seclusion, ŠKUC Theatre in Linhartova Hall Radovljica
- 2001/02 Suzana Tratnik, My Name is Damian, ŠKUC Theatre
- 2000/01 Jean Cocteau, Human Voice, ŠKUC Theatre
- 1998/99 Kristina Brenkova, The Prettiest Flower, Šentjakob Theatre
- 1996/97 Ben Minolli, The Moon Fairy, Šentjakob Theatre
- 1994/95 Berta Bojetu Boeta, Let's Go to See Granny, Puppy Theatre Ljubljana
- 1994/95 Alojz Kraigher, The Shell, assistant director, Šentjakob Theatre
- 1993/94 Dan Totheroth, The Stolen Prince and the Lost Princess, Šentjakob Theatre

== Awards & nominations ==
- 2016 Prix Europa Berlin, ranking in the finale with radio play Mallet, Berlin, Germany
- 2016 Golden lion for directing performances No tears for Queers, 17th International festival of the chamber theater "Golden Lion", Umag/Umago, Croatia
- 2015 First prize for radio drama Hilda, "The Winter's Tales" UK International Radio Drama Festival, Herne Bay, UK
- 2014 Prix Italia 2014, Torino, shortlist "Things to do before you died"
- 2014 Slovenia Radio-Television Award for year 2013 for radio play Women Bomob
- 2014 Prix Ex Aequo 2014, Bratislava, shortlist "Things to do before you died"
- 2013 Prix Italia Torino, shortlist Women Bomb" by Ivana Sajko and Saška Rakef
- 2012 Slovenia Radio-Television Award for year 2011 (national achievement), Ljubljana/Slovenia
- 2011 Ivy Garland for the theater and radio directing, Award of the Slovenian association of Dramatic Artists, Ljubljana/Slovenia
- 2008 Slovenia Radio-Television Award for year 2008 (international achievement), Ljubljana/Slovenia
- 2008 second prize (special category Peace and Friendship of Nation) for radio drama ARIA on 9. International Radio Festival Iran, Isfahan/Iran
- 2007 audience award for the best performance at 20th Čufar Days – This Merry Day or Matiček is Getting Married, Čufar Days 2007, Jesenice/Slovenia
- 2006 audience award for the best comedy – Hey, Cut out the Parading around Stark Naked, Novačan Days 2006, Trnovlje/Slovenia
- 2005 Goldilocks – joint award for the best performance in general – Milan Jeish The Bitter Fruits of Justice, AGRFT Ljubljana/Slovenia
