= Seo Yi-sook =

South Korean actress (born 1966)

- 서이숙
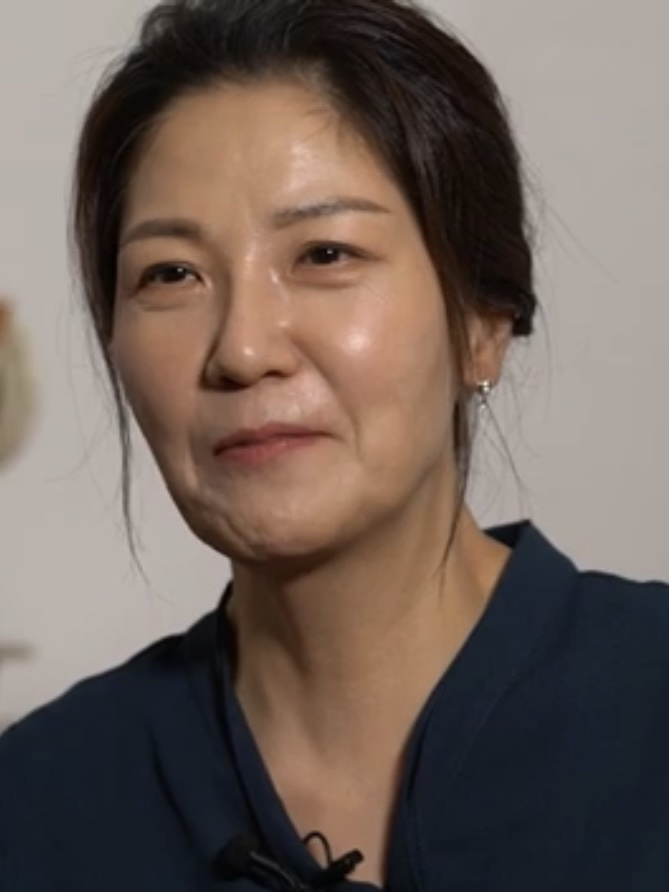
- Seo in 2021
- Born: December 6, 1966 (age 59); Yeoncheon County, Gyeonggi Province, South Korea
- Education: Department of Korean Traditional Music of Chung-Ang University; Graduate School of Department of Korean Music of Chung-Ang University
- Occupation: Actress
- Years active: 1987–present
- Agent(s): Quantum E&M
- Mother: Seo Bok-dong

Korean name
- Hangul: 서이숙
- Hanja: 徐梨淑
- RR: Seo Isuk
- MR: Sŏ Isuk
- Website: Seo Yi-sook Official Website

Seo Yi-sook (Korean: 서이숙; born December 6, 1966) is a South Korean theatre, television and movie actress. She is a recipient of the 2003 Gu Hi-seo Theatre Award for Actor of the Year and Expected Actor, the 40th Dong-A Theatre Award for Best Acting (2004), and the 30th Lee Hae-rang Theater Award (2020).

Seo began her career in 1986 by joining a local theater company in Suwon. She received the Best New Actor Award at the 1986 Korea Theatre Festival and an Acting Award at the 6th National Theatre Festival in 1987. After joining the Michu Theatre Company in 1989, she made her debut with the company in Shin Yi Gukgi. The following year, she debuted as a musical actress in Make a Hero (1990).

Seo made her first television appearance as a supporting actress in 2010. Her television work includes supporting roles in Empress Ki (2013–2014), The Rebel (2017), Hotel del Luna (2019), The World of the Married (2020), and Start-Up (2020); and also feature film The Mayor (2017).

== Early life and education ==
Seo Yi-sook was born December 6, 1966, in Yeoncheon County, Gyeonggi Province, South Korea. She was the elder of two siblings. Her father died of cirrhosis when she was in middle school, and her younger brother died in an accident in her early 20s. These events affected Seo and her mother; they reportedly avoided watching dramas due to emotional distress. Seo's mother continues to reside in their hometown and has not remarried.

While attending Yeoncheon Jeongok High School, Seo played badminton. Her athletic aspirations ended after she was eliminated in the first round of national badminton selections. Due to her family's circumstances, Seo did not attend college. Instead, she joined the Yeoncheon Rural Development Administration, working as a social and physical badminton coach.

Seo's career path shifted after she attended a performance of Agnes of God at the Suwon Arts Theater. The experience was a significant culture shock for her. It prompted her to pursue acting. At nineteen, she applied to a local theater troupe at the Suwon Arts Theater.

== Career ==
=== Early debut years as member of Michu Trope ===
In 1986, Seo began her acting career with a local theater company in Suwon, Gyeonggi Province. Her speaking skills led to her participation in several productions, and she received the Best New Actor Award at the 1986 Korea Theatre Festival. The following year, Seo was cast as the lead, Yeok-hwa, in the play Pakkoji. Produced by Anyang Arts Theatre, with Lee Jae-hyeon as producer and Lee Jae-in as director, the play represented Gyeonggi-Do at the 6th National Theatre Festival. Held from May 20 to June 1, 1987, at the Daejeon Civic Centre, the festival featured troupes from 13 cities and provinces. Pakkoji won the President's Award (grand prize). Individually, director Lee Jae-in received the directing award, and Seo Yi-sook was honored with the Acting Award. Pakkoji was subsequently invited to the 12th Seoul International Theatre Festival in 1988, performing at the Arts Centre Grand Theatre on August 19–20.

In 1989, Seo relocated to Seoul and successfully auditioned for Theatre Company Michu. (Note: Theatre Company Michu (Korean: 극단 미추; Hanja: 美醜) was founded in August 1986 by Son Jin-chaek. The theatre company Michu originated with the 'Son Jinchaek Directing Lab', which established when CEO Son Jin-chaek was the representative of the Minye Theatre. Michu continues to search for the identity of Korean theatre that emphasizes spirit rather than form . Since 1987, Michu has performed Madangnori works every year. Madangnori refers to traditional Korean theatre that combines various forms of folk entertainment, such as puppetry, mask dances and traditional percussion music.) After three months of training, she debuted in Shin Yi Gukgi (1989). A year later, in 1990, she made her musical theater debut in Make a Hero. For over a decade, Seo continued to build her foundation in traditional performing arts, taking on numerous minor roles in Michu's Madangnori productions.

"Her pronunciation, sensibility, and attitude toward people are all honest and sincere actress."

— Theatrical critic Gu Hi-seo.

After working for approximately a decade, Seo decided to further her education and enrolled in the School of Korean Music of Chung-Ang University Undergraduate School. Although she majored in acting, her bachelor's degree was in Korean Music, consistent with the department's name.

Seo encountered difficulty securing lead roles due to her height. However, her breakthrough came with the play Heo Sam-gwan Blood (2003). In this production, she portrayed Heo Ok-ran, the wife of Heo Sam-gwan, marking her first lead role after years in Michu productions. Her performance earned her the Actress of the Year and Expected Actress titles at the Hiseo Theatre Awards on December 20, 2003. She also received the Best Acting Award for the same role at the 40th Dong-A Theatre Awards, held on February 13, 2004.

=== Breaking the troupe barrier ===
Following her notable achievement in 2004, Seo received an offer in 2005 to portray the role of Hester Swain, the female lead in the play Cat Swamp, produced by the Physic Theater Company. This marked the first time in 10 years that Seo, who was a member of Michu, performed on a stage other than a Michu production. Directed by Han Tae-sook, play Cat Swamp is a renowned work by the Irish-born playwright Marina Carr. The play was staged from November 1 to 13, 2005, at the Seoul Daehangno Arko Arts Theater's Grand Theater (formerly known as the Arts Center Arts Theater).

While working as a theater actress, Seo also pursued her studies at the Graduate School of Chung-Ang University's School of Korean Music. In 2005, she began her academic journey, and three years later, in 2008, Seo successfully obtained her master's degree in Korean Music. Her thesis focused on research in Madangnori. Furthermore, she took on the role of a part-time professor, teaching acting classes at her alma mater. Notably, one of her students was trot singer Song Ga-in.

In 2006, Seo had the opportunity to act in Michael Frayn's 1982 Play Noises Off. This popular work premiered in the UK in 1982 and has been performed in 32 countries. It is a comedy that garnered significant attention, leading to a Hollywood movie adaptation following a successful Broadway run. The Korean performance of "Noises Off" took place at Dongsoong Hall, Dongsoong Art Center, Daehak-ro in May 2006. Seo Yi-suk, who portrayed the character of Cracket, received praise for her natural portrayal in the play. Her unique husky voice added to the charm of her performance, and she skillfully led the flow of the play.

Seo collaborated once again with Han Tae-suk in the play Iron. The play is an intense psychological drama by Rona Munro translated by Sung Soo-jeong. In the play, Seo portrayed a female prison guard who develops an affectionate bond with Jae-yi (played by Yoon So-jung), a female prisoner serving a 15-year sentence for murdering her husband. As a fellow woman who has experienced abuse at the hands of men, the guard empathizes with Jae-yi. However, when Jae-yi takes advantage of this affection and smuggles drugs, the guard's empathy turns into disgust. Additionally, there is a hint of jealousy towards the arrival of Jae-yi's daughter, Yoo-jin. Critic said, Seo's portrayal of the gender-neutral character adds a refreshing catharsis to the play.

In 2007, Seo appeared in Bae Sam-shik's Yeol-ha Diary, an adaptation of Park Ji-won's work of the same title. Directed by Son Jin-chaek, known for his serious themes, the play ran from March 10 to 25 at the Seoul Arts Center's Towol Theater. Seo portrayed Yeon-am, a creature described as having characteristics of a horse, donkey, mule, and dog. Her character's narratives introduced chaos and change to a village, prompting curiosity and desire for the unusual. Her performance was well received.

In April 2007, Seo took on the role of the third-rate singer Ju Hyeon-mi in the play Walking Alone on the Yeongdong Bridge as Night Rain Falls. The play, which was inspired by the songs of Ju Hyeon-mi, was written by Choi Chi-eon and directed by Kim Dong-hyun. It satirized the dark era of military dictatorship by featuring a protagonist who was a third-rate poet undergoing censorship of their identity. The play was performed by the theater company Party at the Daehak-ro Information Small Theater starting from April 25.

In 2007, Seo played Clytemnestra in the production of Orestes, alongside Park Ji-il as Orestes. Adapted by Go Young-beom and directed by Lee Seong-yeol, the play explored human nature. Performances of Orestes ran from November 23 to December 2 at the Arko Arts Theater's main stage.

In 2008, Seo was cast as role Helen Damson from the play The Gift of the Gorgon by playwright Peter Shaffer. Seo played opposite actor Jung Dong-hwan, who returned to the stage as Edward Damson after he appeared at the 2003 premiere; and Park Yoon-hee who was cast as Philip. This performance was produced by Experimental theater company. Directed by Koo Tae-hwan, the play was held at the Namsan Drama Center on November 18 to 23, 2008. This project was the most memorable in Seo's career. She received standing ovation from the audience on her last performance.

In August 2009 Seo performed encore the play The Gift of the Gorgon at the Arko Arts Theater in Daehangno, Seoul. Director Park Geun-hyung of Theater Company Alleyway saw her performance and approached Seo in her dressing room to propose a collaboration on Chekhov's The Seagull. Seo accepted the offer, stating, "I was planning to take a break, but I couldn't resist the opportunity to participate in a small theater production after a long time. I was also very interested in Park Geun-hyung's working style." Seo portrays Arkadina, a character at the heart of the play's tragedy. Seo's portrayal of Arkadina was praised by critics. Her performance, characterized by a composed demeanor and dramatic vocal outbursts, adds depth to the intimate theatrical experience. As a respected mid-career actor, she upholds the theater industry's reputation.

In 2009, Seo joined play The Women of Picasso by Synsi Musical Company as the opening work of the 30th 2009 Seoul Theater Festival at Towol Theater, Seoul Arts Center from April 16 to 26, 2009. Korean premiere was directed by British director Paul Garrington who directed The Women of Picasso at the 2000 Edinburgh Festival. The original was premiered at the National Theater in London in July 2000, based on a play by Brian McAvera.

"I am looking forward to a delicate acting transformation suitable for the small theater stage, away from the intelligent and elegant acting of the large theatre."

— Playwright Jang Seong-hee.

Seo takes on the role of the 'eldest daughter' in the play Take Care of Mom. The play has been revitalized through the creative vision of writer Go Yeon-ok, known for her insightful understanding of the human psyche, and director Ko Seok-man, who has honed his directing skills in the theater industry for over 30 years. Seo shares the stage with Jeong Hye-sun, who portrays the character of the mother. Additionally, the cast includes Shim Yang-hong as the husband, Gil Yong-woo as the eldest son, Lee Hye-won as the second daughter, Baek Baek-hee as the grandmother, and Park Woong as Lee Eun-gyu.

In 2011, Seo was selected as the 12th winner by the Kim Dong-hoon Theater Awards. Award was given due Seo excellent acting skills in 'Oedipus' and 'Memories of Catfish' in 2011, and her previous works The Seagull, The Tempest, The Gift of the Gorgon, The Women of Picasso, and Yelha Diary. The Heretics is a work by British author Richard Bean and is introduced for the first time in Korea. Seo, played the role of Diane Cassel, a scientist and professor of high climate department.

=== Debut in television ===
Seo made her first television appearance in early 2010, with the role of Queen Myeong-seong in the SBS drama Jejungwon. Queen Myeong-seong was an influential figure in the Joseon Dynasty. In the series, she formed a close bond with Allen, who saved the life of her niece Min Young-ik, and later developed a friendship with Horton. In early 2011, Seo took on the role of the beggar's wife in MBC historical drama The Duo. Since then the broadcasting industry began to pay attention to Seo, leading to numerous offers.

In the latter half of 2011, Seo had to withdraw from four scheduled plays due to health reasons. As a result, she decided to shift her focus towards television projects. During this time, JTBC, a newly launched cable channel, approached her with the role of Park Sang-gung (Court Lady Park) in the weekend historical drama Insu, the Queen Mother (2011). Subsequently, she appeared in the drama Feast of the Gods (2012), portraying the character Noh Young-shim, who served as Arirang's assistant chef responsible for Chanmo (kimchi, a basic side dish). Noh Young-shim develops romantic feelings for the chef Lim Do-sik (Park Sang-myeon) of Arirang. The drama revolves around the intense rivalry between Go Jun-young (Sung Yu-ri) and Ha In-joo (Seo Hyun-jin) as they compete for the position of master chef in Arirang, a renowned traditional Korean restaurant known for its exceptional cuisine.

=== Theatre comeback and first award in television ===
In 2012, after recovering her health, Seo returned to the stage in I Miss Your Parents. This play was a Korean adaptation of Seigo Hatasawa's Japanese work, Oya no Kao ga Mitai, which deals with school violence. The Korean version was directed by Kim Gwang-bo, known for his socially conscious productions. The production featured a stellar cast of theater stars, including Son Sook, Park Yong-su, Lee Dae-yeon, Park Ji-il, Gil Hae-yeon, Jang Young-nam, and Seo Eun-kyung. Seo, who shared the role with Gil Hae-yeon, played a mother who leverages her position as head of school administration to intimidate the victim's family.

In 2013, Seo appeared as Seo Sang-gung, also known as Court Lady Seo, Empress Tanashiri's (played by Baek Jin-hee) right-hand servant, in the historical television series Empress Ki. The following year, she took on the role of Kang Seok-soon, the chief of Gangnam Police Station, in the 2014 SBS drama You're All Surrounded. The drama was written by Lee Jeong-sun and directed by Yoo In-sik.

Amidst her busy television schedule, which included weekend dramas, daily dramas, and mini-series, Seo continued to perform on stage in the play Romeo and Juliet. This production commemorated the 400th anniversary of Shakespeare's death. Park Jung-Min and Moon Geun-Young played Romeo and Juliet, respectively. Seo, double-cast with Son Byung-ho as Juliet's nanny.

In 2015, Seo Yi-sook portrayed Na Hyun-ae in the KBS Wednesday-Thursday drama Unkind Ladies. Her character was depicted as a snobbish antagonist who bullied Kim Hyun-sook (played by Chae Shi-ra) in the series due to her perceived lack of educational opportunities.

In 2017, Seo joined cast of detective drama Bad Thief, Good Thief as Hong Mi-ae. That same year, she returned to the historical drama genre, portraying Lady Jo, the wife of Jo Cham-bong, in The Rebel. Initially, her role was meant to be minor, with appearances limited to episodes 1 to 5. However, her exceptional acting skills caught the director's attention, leading to an expansion of her screen time. Lady Jo's character extended throughout the entire series, appearing until the final episode, episode 30. Seo's remarkable performance did not go unnoticed. At the 2017 MBC Drama Awards held on December 30, 2017, she was honored with the Golden Acting Award in the Monday-Tuesday Drama category. This recognition served as a testament to her talent as television actress.

In that same year, Seo took on a role in the film Special Citizen as the wife of the lead character, Mayor of Seoul Byun Jong-goo (played by Choi Min-shik). Choi himself considered the scene with Seo as the most memorable in the film. The scene depicted Byun Jong-goo selling his daughter's name to cover up his crime, and his wife, aware of the situation, confronts and criticizes him. As the conflict between the characters escalated, the emotional intensity of the acting became crucial. Choi Min-shik advised Seo to channel her character's resentment, stating, "When I said, 'I'll hit you like a bell in a chapel,' I felt like I was really going to die. I was hit once with full force, and if I were hit again, my face would change." The scene was successfully filmed and included in the final cut of the film without any changes.

In 2018, Seo starred in KBS musical drama Beautiful Story of Joseon. Directed by Kim Dae-hyun, this musical drama depicts the story of young people who wanted find their dreams against the backdrop of the first beauty contest in the Joseon Dynasty. In this two episodes drama, written by Kyung Min-seon, Seo acted alongside Pentagon Yeo-won, Kim Na-ni, Bae Yoon-kyung, and Jung Eun-Pyo. Her next role was Madam Ra in drama Mother. Followed by Kwon Young-sil in My Secret Terrius.

=== Highest recognition in Theater career and recent works ===
"She is an actress who keeps her character in her play for a long time and then takes it out without showing her technique or revealing it."

— Kim Seok-man, the artistic director of the Seoul Theater Company.

In 2018, Seo reunited with director Han Tae-sook for a Korean adaptation of the Greek tragedy Electra. The adaptation, written by Ko Yeon-ok, presented a tense version of Electra's revenge story, transforming Electra into a guerrilla warrior and setting the play in a bunker. Seo and Jang Young-nam, were cast as Electra and Clytemnestra, respectively.Their performances ran from April 26 to May 5, 2018, at the LG Art Center. Critics praised that their performances were filled with charisma.

In 2019, Seo and Woo Mi-hwa were double-cast as Nora Helmer, while Son Jong-hak and Park Ho-san were double-cast as Torwald in the Korean adaptation of the play A Doll's House Part 2 by American playwright Lucas Hnath. Originally released in 2017, the play serves as a "sequel" to Henrik Ibsen's masterpiece A Doll's House which premiered in December 1879. Ibsen's play tells the story of Nora Helmer, the wife of Torvald and mother of three, who ultimately leaves her family behind, challenging the societal norms of a 19th-century wife. In A Doll's House Part 2, set in 1894, Nora Helmer returns after 15 years as a successful writer to file divorce.

In 2019, Seo took on the lead role in the monologue play titled Lady Macbeth's Wardrobe, which was performed on November 6 and 7 at Donhwamun Traditional Music Hall in Seoul. This production is a reinterpretation of the classic Shakespeare's play Macbeth, focusing specifically on the story of Lady Macbeth in a Korean context. Through the presence of traditional Korean attire known as 'Hanbok' in her wardrobe, the memories of Lady Macbeth's past are invoked and brought to the present.

In 2019, Seo starred in the Hong Sisters' fantasy drama series Hotel del Luna. She portrayed the six sister Gods known as Ma-go, Seo not only embodied six distinct characters but also displayed her versatility by creating different voice tones for each role. Seo was praised for her captivating performances, which added depth and richness to the series. Directed by Oh Choong-hwan and Kim Jung-hyun, Hotel del Luna became a record-breaking success, standing as the most-watched tvN drama of 2019 and ranking among the top-rated Korean dramas in cable television history.

Seo's next project is The Shepherd Instead, a psychological play. Written and directed by Han Tae-sook, the play explores themes of sympathy and remorse related to discarding cherished items. It was staged at the Arko Arts Theater Small Theater in Seoul from March 6 to 15, 2020. Seo performed alongside Jeon Park-chan, Son Jin-hwan, Kim Eun-seok, Seong Yeo-jin, Kim Do-wan, Yoo Seung-rak, and Park Soo-jin.

In 2020, Seo made a guest appearance in the JTBC series The World of the Married, the South Korean adaptation of BBC's Doctor Foster. She played Chae Gook-hee, Chairman Choi's wife and a patient of the protagonist Ji Seon-woo (played by Kim Hee-ae). Chae Gook-hee's character significantly impacted Ji Seon-woo's life. The drama achieved the highest ratings in South Korean cable television history at the time. Seo's performance, particularly in scenes with Kim Hee-ae, was well-received.

On June 22, 2020, Seo received the prestigious 30th Lee Hae-rang Drama Award during the awards ceremony held at the Chosun Ilbo Museum of Art. The Lee Hae-rang Theater Award, established by the Lee Hae-rang Theater Foundation, serves as a tribute to Lee Hae-rang, a trailblazer in the Korean theater industry who died in 1989. This esteemed accolade is bestowed upon individuals or theater groups that have made significant contributions to the traditional theater field.

In the same year, Seo reunited with director Oh Choong-hwan in drama Start-Up. Seo plays Yoon Seon-hak, the CEO of SH Venture Capital and the founder of Sandbox. She had a pioneering vision of recognizing the business and she succeeded both as an investor in her business and as an investor. Also in 2020, Seo was cast Jo Yoon-sil, the strict mother of Seon Woo-jun, acted by Lee Jae-wook in KBS drama Do Do Sol Sol La La Sol.

In March 2021, Seo was offered the role of Anita in the premiere adaptation of Philip Ridley's play Vincent River, directed by Shin Yoo-cheong. The play revolves around the poignant conversations between Anita and Davy. Anita, a grieving mother who tragically lost her gay son Vincent in a homophobic assault and murder, is haunted by the loss. Meanwhile, Davy, a character who hovers around Anita, adds depth to the narrative. Vincent River explores themes of homophobia, hate crimes, and discriminatory views. It marked the second collaborative project between MPN Company and Ateod, with the aim of revitalizing the Daehangno performance market and establishing a stable production environment. The play made its debut in Korea in April 2021.

In the summer of 2021, Seo had the opportunity to share the role of actress 'A' with Jung Jae-eun in the play The Dressing Room (Gakuya). This production takes place in the dressing room of a theater where Anton Chekhov's The Seagull is being performed. Actress 'A' is portrayed as a ghost seeking solace in the dressing room, haunted by unfulfilled aspirations for a specific role. Despite predominantly taking on the roles of prompter or minor characters, 'A' has always harbored a deep desire to play a leading female role. The Dressing Room holds significance as it is the renowned work of Kunio Shimizu, a celebrated Japanese playwright who died in April 2021.

== Philanthropy ==
Seo, who was honored with the 30th Hae-rang Theater Award, donated the prize money to her alma mater and colleagues in the performing arts industry who are facing difficulties due to COVID-19. On the 25th, Seo Yi-sook's agency, Quantum E&M, announced, "Actress Yi-sook Seo donated the theater prize money to the theater industry, including the Welfare Foundation, a theater, and Jeongok High School, where she graduated."

On July 1, 2022, Seo signed an agreement with three senior centers, namely Jeongok Senior Citizens Center, Jeongok 5-ri Senior Citizens' Center, and Jeongok Koaru Apartment Senior Citizens' Center, and sponsored them.

== Personal life ==
In 2011, Seo underwent her first comprehensive health checkup, arranged by the Korea Actors Welfare Foundation. She was diagnosed with thyroid cancer. She had surgery in July, after her performance in Memories of Catfish, and while the operation was successful, doctors noted a risk of vocal cord abnormalities due to the thyroid gland's location (proximity to the uvula). The hospital advised that her voice would be uncomfortable to use for some time, with a vocal cord examination scheduled after six months. She began rehearsals for the play The God of Massacre but experienced throat strain and pain. Concerned about affecting her colleagues, Seo ultimately withdrew from the production. Subsequently, Seo decided to withdraw from other scheduled plays, including Oedipus, Gift of Gorgon, and There's No Sleepless Night.

Recovering from the illness, created a significant challenge for Seo, a theater actor acclaimed for her powerful voice. She later spoke of the profound emptiness and fear she felt at the prospect of losing the voice that defined her stage career. During the same time, she received an offer for a royal concubine role in the JTBC historical drama Insu, the Queen Mother. Given that the drama demanded less vocal strain than theater, she accepted the role as an opportunity to gain diverse experience while taking a break.

From July to September 2021, false rumors claiming Seo had died from a heart attack spread online. Her agency, Quantum E&M, responded by taking legal action against the source of the rumors, issuing a statement that emphasized a firm stance with "no leniency."

== Filmography ==
=== Film ===
List of Film(s)
Year	Title		Role	Ref.
Year	English	Korean	Role	Ref.
1998	Beautiful Times	아름다운 시절	Gwangjudaek	
2010	Best Seller	베스트셀러	the original author's daughter	
2011	Cat: Two Eyes of Death	고양이: 죽음을 보는 두 개의 눈	psychiatrist	
2014	The Fatal Encounter	역린	Go Soo-ae	
2017	The Mayor	특별시민	Mayor Byun's wife	
2018	Memory of That Day	그날의 기억	Hee-ja	
2021	Hypnosys	최면	Cameo	

=== Television drama ===
List of Television Musical Drama(s)
Year	Title		Role	Note	Ref.
Year	English	Korean	Role	Note	Ref.
2021	Joseon Beauty Pageant	조선미인별전	Kim Ma-nim	2 episodes	

=== Television series ===
List of Television Drama Series(s)
Year	Title		Role	Note	Ref.
Year	English	Korean	Role	Note	Ref.
2010	Jejungwon	제중원	Queen Myung-sung		
2011	Insu, the Queen Mother	인수대비	Court Lady Park		
2011	The Duo	짝패	Keun-nyeon		
2012	Feast of the Gods	신들의 만찬	No Young-sim		
2013	Your Neighbor's Wife	네 이웃의 아내	Ha Sung-in		
2013	The Heirs	왕관을 쓰려는 자, 그 무게를 견뎌라 – 상속자들	Hyo-shin's mother		
2013	The King's Daughter, Soo Baek-hyang	제왕의 딸 수백향	Mrs. Yong-goo	Cameo	
2013	Two Weeks	투윅스	deaf woman	Cameo (Ep.4)	
2013	Blooded Palace: The War of Flowers	궁중잔혹사 – 꽃들의 전쟁	Seol-jook		
2013	Pure Love	일말의 순정	Ma Eun-hee		
2013–2014	You're All Surrounded	너희들은 포위됐다	Kang Seok-soon		
2013–2014	Empress Ki	기황후	Court Lady Seo (Empress Tanashiri's right-hand servant)		
2014	Diary of a Night Watchman	야경꾼 일지	Queen Chung-soo		
2014	My Dear Cat	고양이는 있다	Hong Soon-ja		
2015	Unkind Ladies	착하지 않은 여자들	Na Hyun-ae		
2015	Heart to Heart	하트 투 하트	Psychiatrist Uhm Gi-choon		
2015–2016	Six Flying Dragons	육룡이 나르샤	Myo-sang, Moo-hyul's grandmother		
2016	The Master of Revenge	마스터-국수의 신	Seol Mi-ja		
2016	Happy Home	가화만사성	Jang Kyung-ok		
2016–2017	First Love Again	다시, 첫사랑	Kim Young-sook		
2017	Reunited Worlds	다시 만난 세계	Jung-won's mother	Cameo	
2017	Bad Thief, Good Thief	도둑놈, 도둑님	Hong Mi-ae		
2017	The Rebel	역적: 백성을 훔친 도적	Lady Jo, Jo Cham-bong's wife		
2018	My Secret Terrius	내 뒤에 테리우스	Kwon Young-sil		
2018	Mother	마더	Madame Ra		
2019	Hotel del Luna	호텔 델루나	Ma-go Sisters	Six Roles	
2019	The Banker	더 뱅커	Do Jeong-ja		
2019	My Lawyer, Mr. Jo 2: Crime and Punishment	동네변호사 조들호	Shin Mi-sook		
2020	Do Do Sol Sol La La Sol	도도솔솔라라솔	Jo Yoon-sil		
2020	Start-Up	스타트업	Yoon Seon-hak		
2020	The World of the Married	부부의 세계	Chairman Choi's wife	Cameo	
2020	Nobody Knows	아무도 모른다	Mo Su-jeong	Cameo	
2020	Welcome 2 Life	웰컴2라이프	Shin Jeong-hye	Cameo	
2022	Under the Queen's Umbrella	슈룹	Deposed Queen Yoon		
2022	Shooting Stars	별똥별	Actress from Star Force Entertainment	Cameo	
2023	The Good Bad Mother	나쁜엄마	Park Sung-ae		
2024	Knight Flower	밤에 피는 꽃	Nan-kyung		
2025	Bon Appetit, Your Majesty	폭군의 셰프	Grand Queen Dowager Inju		

=== Web series ===
List of Web Series
Year	Title		Role	Note	Ref.
Year	English	Korean	Role	Note	Ref.
2022	Rookie Cops	너와 나의 경찰수업	Kim Soon-young	Disney+ Original Series	
2023	Queenmaker	퀸메이커	Son Young-sim	Netflix Original Series	
2024	Red Swan	화인가 스캔들	Park Mi-ran	Disney+ Original Series	

=== Television shows ===
List of Appearance(s) in Television shows
Year	Title		Role	Note	Ref.
Year	English	Original	Role	Note	Ref.
2014	OBS 'Unique Entertainment News'	OBS '독특한 연예뉴스'	Featured Actress	OBS	
2014	KBS Entertainment Weekly	연예가중계	Featured Actress	KBS (2014.07.13)	
2018	KBS Entertainment Weekly	연예가중계	Featured Actress	KBS (2014.07.13)	
2019	Happy Together	해피투게더	Panelists	KBS (2014.07.13)	
2022	Hot Singers	뜨거운 씽어즈	Cast Member	JTBC	
2022	Radio Stars	황금어장 라디오스타	Panelists	MBC	
2022	Late Night Ghost Talk	심야괴담회	Panelists	MBC	
2020	Problem Child in House	옥탑방의 문제아들	Panelists	KBS Ep 92	
2020	I live with a sick dog	나는 아픈 개와 산다	Cast Member	KBS	
2020	Bob Bless You 2	밥블레스유	Panelists	Olive Episode 10	

== Stage ==
=== Musical ===
List of musical play(s)
Year	Title		Role	Theater	Date	Ref.
Year	English	Korean	Role	Theater	Date	Ref.
1990	Make a Hero	영웅만들기	non-reporters	Arts and Culture Center Grand Theater	Mar 27 – Apr 2	
2002	(1st) Uijeongbu Music Theater Festival; yard play swing	(제1회) 의정부음악극축제 ; 마당놀이 변강쇠		Uijeongbu Indoor Gymnasium	April 26	
2003	Jungle Book	정글이야기	wolf captain	Seoul Art Center Small Theater	Jun 14 – Jul 6	

=== Theater performance as member of Theater Company Michu ===
All stage plays as member of Theater Company Michu
Year	Title		Role	Theater	Date	Ref.
Year	English	Korean	Role	Theater	Date	Ref.
1988	(1988) Seoul International Theater Festival : Barkkoji	(1988) 서울국제연극제 : 바꼬지	Yeon-hwa	Culture and Art Hall Grand Theater	Aug 19–20	
1989	Shin Yi Gukgi	신이국기	People	Arts and Culture Center Grand Theater	May 9–15	
1991	Shadow of Time - Trilogy	시간의 그림자 - 3부작	Citizen	Arts and Culture Center Grand Theater	June 25–30	
1993	Namsadang Sky	남사당의 하늘	Bok-joo	National Theater	June 18–24	
1994	Macbeth	맥베드		Arts and Culture Center Grand Theater	May 24–30	
1994	Namsadang Sky	남사당의 하늘	Buk-seo	National Theater Grand Theater	June 18–26	
1994	Hit and Run	뺑파전	Bong-Soo Shim	KBS 88 Gym	Nov 26 – Dec 11	
1994	General Oh's Claw	오장군의 발톱	Mook	Seoul Art Center CJ Towol Theater	Nov 22–25	
1995	General Oh's Claw	오장군의 발톱	Mook	National Theater Small Theater	Jun 5–17	
1995	Preludes - Chopin's Prelude.	페르라세즈 - 쇼팽의 전주곡		Information Small Theater	Aug 3 – Sep 3	
1995	General Oh's Claw	오장군의 발톱	Mook	Incheon General Culture and Arts Center	Oct 23	
1995	From Heaven to Earth - The Cowherd and the Weaver Girl	하늘에서 땅에서 - 견우와 직녀	Fairy	National Theater Grand Theater	Nov 25–29	
1996	Tom Tom Nangrang Tom, Love Story of Hodong and Nangrang	둥둥 낙랑 둥	Dwarf	Seoul Art Center CJ Towol Theater	July 12–24	
1997	An Ideal Husband	이상적 남편	Yun Hye-rim	Art and Culture Center Grand Theater	Feb 6 – Mar 3	
1997	General Oh's Claw	오장군의 발톱	Mook	Seoul Arts Center	Sep 16–21	
1997	Madangnori Aerangjeon	마당놀이 애랑전	Haeng-su	Jeongdong Cultural Gymnasium	Nov 20 – Dec 7	
1998	Scorching Sun	뙤약볕	Sunmaru	Arts and Culture Center Small Theater	April 14–22	
1998	(22nd) Seoul International Theater Festival: Hot Sunshine	(제22회) 서울국제연극제: 뙤약볕	Sunmaru	Seoul Art Center Small Theater	Jun 14 – Jul 6	
1999	That Fire	그, 불	city woman	Arts and Culture Center Grand Theater	Jun 11–29	
2002	A Midsummer Night's Dream	한여름밤의 꿈	Hippolytus	Seoul Arts Center outdoor theater	8.3–8.11	
2003	Heo Sam-gwan's Blood Vessel	허삼관 매혈기	Heo Ok-ran	Center for Arts and Culture Arts Theater Grand Theater	April 10–20	
2003	Choi Seung-hee	최승희	Woman	Seoul Art Center CJ Towol Theater	Sep 26 – Oct 12	
2003–2004	Lee Chun-pung	이춘풍	Oh Mok-yi	National Theater Daloreum Theater	Nov 14 – Jan 4	
2004	(25th) Seoul Theater Festival: Bakery	(제25회) 서울연극제: 빵집	Narrator	Center for Arts and Culture Arts Theater Grand Theater	May 4–9	
2004	Theater Heated Battle—Heo Sam-tube Blood Vending Machine	연극열전 - 허삼관매혈기	Heo Ok-ran	Dongsung Art Center Dongsung Hall	Jun 4 – Jul 4	
2004	Choi Seung-hee	최승희	Woman	National Theater Shizuoka, Japan	Oct 16 – Nov 7	
2004	Three Kingdoms	삼국지	No-sook	Sangam World Cup Stadium	Nov 20 – Dec 12	
2005	Withdrawal Story	철수이야기	Woman	Michusanbang White Stone Theater	July 15—17	
2006	Jo's orphan	조씨고아	Mother Jang-hee, Musa	Seoul Art Center CJ Towol Theater	Sep 3–14	
2007	Yeolha Ilmanbo	열하일기만보	Yeon-am	Seoul Art Center CJ Towol Theater	March 10–25	
2008	Namsadang Sky - The art soul of our clowns who have been here for 100 years!	남사당의 하늘 - 100년을 이어온 우리 광대들의 예술혼!	Jang Gu-so	Arko Arts Theater Grand Theater	Mar 27 – Apr 6	
2008	King Lear	리어왕	The Clown	Seoul Art Center CJ Towol Theater	Sep 4–10	
2009	King Lear	리어왕	The Clown	Arko Arts Theater Grand Theater	Mar 13–22	
2009	The Tempest	템페스트	Miranda	Seoul Art Center CJ Towol Theater	May 20 – Jun 6	
2009	(2009) SPAF Seoul International Performing Arts Festival: Shakespeare in the 13th year of Cheoljong	(2009) SPAF 서울국제공연예술제 : 철종13년의 셰익스피어	Ganwol-yi	Daehakro Arts Theater Grand Theater	Oct 19–23	
2010	King Lear	리어왕	Goneril	Myongdeong Arts Theater	June 12–20	

=== Theater works post Michu ===
List of stage play(s)
Year	Title		Role	Theater	Date	Ref.
Year	English	Korean	Role	Theater	Date	Ref.
2005	Cat Swamp	고양이늪	Hester Swayne	Arko Arts Theater Grand Theater	Nov 1–13	
2006	Spring Day is Gone	봄날은 간다	Daughter	Small Theater Festival	April 7 – May 28	
2006	Noises Off	노이즈 오프	actor Kang Yi-suk, Clarket	Dongsung Art Center	Apr 19 – May 28	
2006–2007	Steel	강철	Yeojogwan (female prison guard)	Arunguji Small Theater	Dec 15 – Jan 28	
2007	Walking Alone on Yeongdong Bridge in the Rain	밤비 내리는 영동교를 홀로 걷는	Joo Hyeon-mi	Daehangno Information Center	Apr 25 – May 13	
2007	Orestes	오레스테스	Clytemnestra	Arko Arts Theater Grand Theater	11.23–12.02	
2008	The Gift of the Gorgon	고곤의 선물	Helen Damson	Namsan Arts Center	Nov 18–23	
2009	2009 Seoul Theater Festival - Picasso's Women	2009 서울연극제 - 피카소의 여인들	Olga	Seoul Arts Center CJ Towol Theater	April 16–26	
2009	The Gift of the Gorgon	고곤의 선물	Helen Damson	Arko Arts Theater Grand Theater	June 10–21	
2009	The Seagull	갈매기	Arkhona	Daehangno Guerrilla Theater	Aug 1–30	
2010	Take Care of Mom	엄마를 부탁해	eldest daughter	Sejong Center for the Performing Arts M Theater	2010.01.27–03.23	
2010	Play <In-In-In-series> No Sleepless Nights	연극〈인인인 시리즈〉잠 못드는 밤은 없다	Chizco	Doosan Art Center Space111	2010.05.11–06.06	
2010	Morning Drama	아침 드라마	woman	Daehangno Guerrilla Theater	Nov 5–28	
2011	Maggie's Memories	매기의 추억	Seon-min	Daehangno Information Theater	05.26–06.19	
2011	I miss your parents' faces	니 부모 얼굴이 보고 싶다	Nam Yoon-jung as Mo	Sejong Center for the Performing Arts M Theater	06.24–07.29	
2012	Oedipus	오이디푸스	Jocasta	Myongdong Arts Theater	Jan 20 – Feb 13	
2012	Our Town	아워 타운	stage director	Myeongdong Arts Theater	09.18–10.14	
2013	Heretics	이단자들	Diane Cassel	Sogang University Mary Hall	08.22–09.01	
2014–2015	Vanya and Sonya and Masha and Spike	바냐와 소냐와 마샤와 스파이크	Misha	Daehakro Arts Theater Grand Theater	Dec 5 – Jan 4	
2014–2015	Man from Earth	맨 프럼 어스	Edith	Uniplex 2	Nov 7 – Feb 22	
2015	Portrait of Marina Tsvetaeva	마리나 츠베타예바의 초상	Marina Tsvetaeva	Dongsung Art Center Kokduso Theater	Aug 28 – Sep 6	
2016–2017	Romeo and Juliet	로미오와 줄리엣	Nanny	National Theater Daloreum Theater	Dec 9 – Jan 13	
2017	Romeo and Juliet	로미오와 줄리엣	Nanny	Gunpo Culture and Arts Center Suri Hall (Grand Performance Hall)	Jan 21–22	
2018	Electra — Directed by Han Tae-Suk	한태숙 연출 엘렉트라	Clytemnestra	LG Art Center	April 26 – May 5	
2019	Lady Macbeth's Wardrobe	맥베스 부인의 장롱	Lady Machbeth	Seoul Donhwamun Traditional Music Center	Nov 6–7	
2020	A Doll's House	인형의 집, Part 2	Nora Helmer	LG Art Center	April 10–28	
2020	The Shepperd Instead	대신 목자	-	Arko Arts Theater Small Theater	March 6–15	
2021	Vincent River	빈센트 리버	Anita	Chungmu Art Center Medium Theater Black	Apr 27 – Jul 11	
2021	Dressing Room	분장실	A	Daehakro Jayu Theater	Aug 7 – Sep 12	

== Voice actor ==
=== Audiobook ===
List of audiobook(s)
Year	Title		Published Date	Ref.
Year	English	Korean	Published Date	Ref.
2019	The Dark Ages of Park Kyung-ri read by Seo Yi-sook	서이숙이 읽는 박경리의 암흑시대	2019.07.23	
2019	Shakespeare's four great tragedies, Macbeth (with Yang Jun-mo, Oh Man-seok, Kwak Myeong-hwa, Kwon Woo-kyung, Kim Seok-hoon, Kim Yong-sun, Kim Hak-cheol, Park Seon-hye, Seung Ju-young, Shin Hyun-yong, Lee Seung-ho, Lee In-cheol, Lee Ji-soo, Jang Ki-yong, Jung Sang-cheol)	셰익스피어 4대 비극 《맥베스》	2019.10.15	
2020	Kyunghee (RESOUND short story, read by Seo Yi-sook)	경희 (RESOUND 단편, 서이숙 낭독)	2020.03.09	
2021	Xiaohong's hand read by Seo Yi-sook	서이숙이 읽는 샤오훙의 손	2021.07.14	

=== Radio ===
List of radio show(s)
Year	Title	Broadcast Date	Notes	Ref.
2016	EBS FM Reading Radio Reading Series — 100 Actors Read Our Literature	January 27 to February 3; 14:20 to 14:40	Actor Seo Yi-sook's "The Dark Ages" It is a story about losing a husband due to the war and the accident of Soonyoung, who lives with her mother and younger brother and sister, and even her son due to the hospital's insincerity.	
2016	EBS FM Reading Radio Reading Series — 100 Actors Read Our Literature	January 27 to February 3; 25:20 to 25:40 (rerun)	Actor Seo Yi-sook's "The Dark Ages" It is a story about losing a husband due to the war and the accident of Soonyoung, who lives with her mother and younger brother and sister, and even her son due to the hospital's insincerity.	
2016	EBS FM Reading Radio Reading Series — 100 Actors Read Our Literature	February 7; 21:00 to 23:00 (rerun)	Actor Seo Yi-sook's "The Dark Ages" It is a story about losing a husband due to the war and the accident of Soonyoung, who lives with her mother and younger brother and sister, and even her son due to the hospital's insincerity.	

== Discography ==
List of single(s)
Title	Year	Album	Notes	Ref.
"Lying in The Sea" (바다에 누워) (with DK)	2015	Immortal Song - Sing a Legend (Summer Special with Friends)	Songs were performed in variety show Immortal Songs: Singing the Legend	
"Madame Class" (마님s 클래스) (with Jang Jae-hwa)	2018	Joseon Beauty Pageant OST	Songs were performed in Two Episodes Musical Drama Joseon Beauty Pageant.	
"Shout at Me" (나를 외치다)	2022	Hot Singers Part 1	Songs were performed in variety show Hot Singers	
"Super Star" (with Woo Mi-hwa)	2022	Hot Singers Part 2	Songs were performed in variety show Hot Singers	

== Ambassadorship ==
Year	Title	Ref.
2014	Korea Autumn Art Festival PR ambassador	
2017	Yeoncheon-gun PR ambassador	
2020	6th Seoul Citizen's Theater Festival PR ambassador	

== Awards and nominations ==
List of Award(s) and Nomination(s)
Year	Award ceremony	Category	Nominee / Work	Result	Ref.
1986	Korean Drama Festival	Best New Actor Award	Seo Yi-sook	Won	
1988	6th National Theater Festival	Best Actress Award	Seo Yi-sook; Pakkoji	Won	
1989	National Theater Festival Acting Award	Best Actress Award	Seo Yi-sook	Won	
2003	Hi-seo Theater Awards (Note: The Hi-seo Theater Awards (히서연극상) was established in 1996 by theatre critic Gu Hee-seo (구히서) (1939 to 2019). In 1996, the first year started with the Theatre of the Year Award. Since 1997, two winners were selected, one each for The Theater Man of the Year and The Theatre Award. Winners were given plaques and prizes funded from The Metaa wine party auction that takes place a month before the awards ceremony. The last award ceremony was in 2015.)	Actor of the Year	Seo Yi-sook	Won	
2003	Hi-seo Theater Awards	Expected Actor	Seo Yi-sook	Won	
2004	40th Dong-A Theater Awards (Note: The Dong-A Theater Awards (동아연극상) established in 1964 to expand and develop the base of Korean theater, have contributed to the revitalization of Korean theater by selecting and awarding performers, theater troupes and organizations that have performed outstandingly every year.)	Best Acting Award	Seo Yi-sook in Heo Sam-gwan's Blood Throne	Won	
2011	12th Kim Dong-hoon Theater Award (Note: The Kim Dong-hoon Theater Award (김동훈 연극상에) was established in 2000 to honor Kim Dong-hoon (1939–1996), a theater director and theater actor. Kim Dong-hoon, who studied aesthetics at Gyeonggi High School and Seoul National University, and worked in the theater company's experimental theater, left his mark in Korean theater as an actor, director, theater troupe operator, and theater administrator.)	Best Actress Theater	Seo Yi-sook	Won	
2017	MBC Drama Awards	Golden Acting Award, Actress in a Monday-Tuesday Drama	The Rebel	Won	
2020	30th Lee Hae-rang Theater Award (Note: The Lee Hae-rang Theater Award was established by the Lee Hae-rang Theater Foundation to commemorate the Lee Hae-rang, a pioneer in the Korean theater industry.)	Best Actress	Seo Yi-sook	Won	
