= Woo Mi-hwa =

South Korean actress (born 1974)

- 우미화
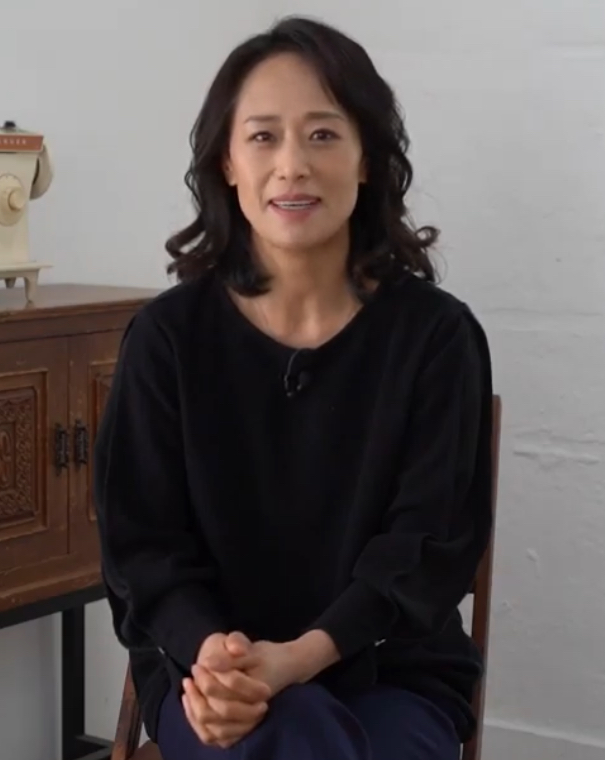
- Woo in 2021
- Born: February 24, 1974 (age 52); Gangwon Province, South Korea
- Education: Department German Literature of Sookmyung Women's University; Department Theater and Film of Dongguk University
- Occupation: Actress
- Years active: 1998–present
- Agent: D-plan Entertainment
- Spouse: Yoon Jeong-hwan (m. 2006)

Korean name
- Hangul: 우미화
- RR: U Mihwa
- MR: U Mihwa

Woo Mi-hwa (Korean: 우미화, February 2, 1974) is a South Korean actress. She began her career in theater before transitioning to supporting roles in television and film. She debuted as a theater actress in 1998, playing Petra in the Korean adaptation of the play An Enemy of the People.

Woo has performed in over 60 theater productions. Some of her notable stage roles include acclaimed revivals of Three Sisters and Dear Elena. She has received several theater acting awards, including the 2011 Seoul Theater Festival Female Acting Award and Best Actress at the 2011 Korea Acting Awards for Blowing Songs Flowers in the Rain, Best Actress of the 2013 Korean Drama Awards for Three Sisters, and the 2017 SACA Best Actress Award for her portrayal of Elena in Dear Elena.

She has appeared in supporting roles in various films and television dramas. Her first notable supporting role on television was in the drama series Life (2018). In the same year, she also appeared in Sky Castle (2018), Doctor Prisoner (2018), and Black Dog: Being A Teacher (2018). Before acting in the crime drama Voice Season 4 (2020), She signed with her current agency D-plan Entertainment.

Her most recognized role in television is Lee Myung-shin, Hye-jin's stepmother in Hometown Cha-Cha-Cha (2021). She has also played significant supporting roles in Bloody Heart and Link: Eat, Love, Kill. She also known for her role as Dok Go-soon, chief of firefighter squad in drama The First Responders.

== Early life and education ==
Woo was born on February 2, 1974, into a mining family in Hambaek, a village near Yeongwol, Gangwon Province. She spent her early years in her hometown until her father relocated to Seoul in search of employment due to the decline of the mining industry. Following her father's move, Woo's older sister also moved to Seoul, and eventually, Woo transferred to Boseong Girls High School in Namsan, Seoul. During this period, she stayed with her sister while waiting for her mother to complete their affairs in Hambaek before joining them in the city.

After completing high school, Woo enrolled in the Department of German Literature at Sookmyung Women's University, which had a tradition of staging annual German translation plays. During a summer break, she participated in a play reading and production class and was unexpectedly chosen as an actress. Despite her initial shyness and the challenges of adapting to city life, she developed a strong interest in acting and decided to pursue it further. After obtaining her bachelor's degree in German Literature, Woo transferred to Dongguk University's Department of Theater and Film to further her studies in acting.

== Career ==
=== 1998–2000: Theater debut ===
After successfully passing an audition with the Seoul Theater Company, (Note: Seoul Theater Company (서울시립극단) is municipal theater company affiliated with Seoul Metropolitan Government. The Seoul Theater Company was established on January 1, 1997.) and becoming a trainee member, Woo made her acting debut in 1998 at the age of 24, playing Petra in the Korean adaptation of Henrik Ibsen's play An Enemy of the People. This production, directed by Kim Seok-man, featured actors and featured acclaimed actors Lee Ho-jae as Dr. Thomas Stokeman and Yoon Joo-sang as Mayor Peter Stokeman. This marked their first collaboration in 20 years since Shakespeare's As You Like It. For Woo, being part of such a significant production was a noteworthy experience.

Woo also participated in another project with the Seoul Theater Company, the MBC Family Musical Lulu and the Twelve Fairies – A Beautiful Winter Story (1999), in which she played dual roles as a rabbit and the Fairy of August.

=== 2001–2014: Yeonwoo Theater Company and Iru Theater Company ===
From 2001 to 2004, Woo was a member of the Yeonwoo Theater Company (Note: Yeonwoo Stage (연우무대를), (Yeonwoo Mudae) which means 'playing friend', started as a small group on February 5, 1977, and is Korea's representative theater company that has led the revitalization of creative plays in the Korean theater world. From the days of Sinchon to the present in Hyehwa-dong, Yeonwoo Stage has been working hard to realize the complete stage of novel creative works.) participating in over ten stage productions, including Lee (2001), Korean Wooturi (2002), and That Guy Looks Like a Radish (2003).

In 2004, Son Ki-ho, a former member of the Yeonwoo Theater Company, established Theater Company Iru. Woo and fellow actress Yeom Hye-ran joined him as founding members. Through her collaboration with Son, Woo gained recognition as an actress in Daehangno. One notable project was the play Blowing Songs Flowers in the Rain, which premiered in 2010 and received critical acclaim, including several awards. It won the 2010 Jeon Mun-yeon Drama Competition and the 2010 Myeongdong Arts Theater Creative Factory awards. At the 2011 Seoul Theater Festival, it won four awards, including the Grand Prize and the Female Acting Award, which Woo received for her performance.

From 2008 to 2010, Woo appeared in the plays The People Who Lived in Gampo, Deok-yi, and Yeol-soo. In 2009, she reprised her roles in these plays while also participating in a preview performance of the Korean adaptation of the play We Love Too Much To Meet Everyday, based on the French play by Guy Alloucherie. In 2010, she took part in the 6th Women's Director's Fair productions, specifically Fighting Women and Who Else Said We Would Be Like Us?.

In 2013, Woo portrayed Olga in the Korean adaptation of Anton Chekhov play Three Sisters. directed by Moon Sam-hwa and staged at the Seoul Arts Center's Free Small Theater. Her performance earned her the Best Actress award at the 2013 Korean Drama Awards.

=== 2015-present: Television debut ===
Woo transitioned to television without a specific reason, following the path of many theater actors who take on roles in film and drama. Her first role was as a female tailor in the drama series Heard It Through the Grapevine (2015). The following year, she returned to theater in Kim Kwang-lim's 1996 stage play Come see me (2016). This National Theater production is loosely based on the true story of Korea's first confirmed serial murders that occurred between 1986 and 1991 in Hwaseong, Gyeonggi, where Woo portrayed the character Park Gi-ja.

"If you continue to do good projects with good actors, wouldn't it be possible to contribute a little to making the world a better place than it is now? Beyond just looking at the painful history, I hope we can think and feel what to do in the future together. I want to find it with the audience." (Actor Woo Mi-hwa)

— Woo on Warriors of Sunshine (2018)

In 2017, Woo played the title role of Elena in Dear Elena, Oh In-ha's Korean adaptation of Lyudmila Razumovskaya's play Dorogaya Yelena Sergeyevna, for which she won the 2017 SACA Best Actress Award.

That same year, Woo participated in a memorial performance for the late Kim Dong-hyun in the play Are You Okay?, which was performed at Doosan Art Center Space 111. She acted alongside Seong Yeo-jin and Jeon Park-chan. Kim Dong-hyun was the founder of the theater troupe Elephant Manbo. Despite his absence, his colleagues celebrated the 10th anniversary of the troupe. Although Woo is a member of the Iru Theater Company, she has also remained active with Elephant Manbo.

In 2018, Woo was cast in the theater play Warrior of Sunshine. During the same year, she took on several minor television roles, the most notable being Do-hoon's mother in the JTBC drama Sky Castle, where she portrayed a mother who flirts with Han Seo-jin (Yeom Jeong-ah) for her son education. Woo also secured her first supporting role in a television series as gynecologist Kim Jung-hee in the drama Life. She expressed gratitude for this role, noting it was the first time she could discuss the character's thoughts and values.

In 2019, Woo and Seo Yi-sook were double cast as Nora Helmer in the Korean adaptation of A Doll's House Part 2 by American playwright Lucas Hnath. This play serves as a sequel to Henrik Ibsen's A Doll's House, originally released in 1879. In the original play, Nora Helmer, a mother of three and wife of Torvald, leaves her family to seek independence. A Doll's House Part 2, set in 1894, follows Nora, now a successful writer, as she returns after 15 years to file for divorce.

Woo made her feature film debut in 2020 as the titular character in Han Jae-yi's melodrama Ivy, which follows the lives of Eun-soo and Ye-won, a lesbian couple who must care for Eun-soo's niece, Su-min, after her mother dies in an accident. That year, she also appeared as Dr. Livingstone, a psychiatrist, in the Seoul Arts Center adaptation of John Pielmeier's play Agnes of God.

In March 2021, Woo was offered the role of Anita in the MPN Company play Vincent River, adaption of Philip Ridley's play, directed by Shin Yoo-cheong. Anita is a mother who has lost her gay son, Vincent, in a homophobic assault. The play focuses on the conversations between Anita and Davy, addressing issues of homophobia and discrimination. The play was the second collaboration between MPN Company and Ateod, which aimed to revitalize the Daehangno performance market and create a stable production environment. It premiered in Korea in April 2021. Woo reprised her role in 2022.

In 2021, Woo starred alongside Song Kang-ho in Han Jae-rim's film Emergency Declaration.

== Personal life ==
Woo Mi-hwa is nicknamed "Woo-bosal" - a portmanteau of her surname and a short term for a righteous Bodhisattva - by her theater colleagues, reflecting her calm demeanor and willingness to support junior actors.

She met her husband, Yoon Jeong-hwan, a fellow actor, theater director, and producer, while they were both students in Dongguk University's Department of Theater and Film. After dating for more than 10 years, they married in 2006.

== Filmography ==
=== Film ===
Feature film performances
Year	Title		Role	Ref.
Year	English	Korean	Role	Ref.
2018	Seven Years of Night	7년의 밤	Hyun Soo-mo	
2019	The Culprit	진범	Da-yeon unni	
2020	Take Me Home (Ivy)	담쟁	Jung Eun-soo	
2020	Honest Candidate	정직한 후보	Seulgi's mom	
2022	Emergency Declaration	비상선언	Hye-yoon	

=== Television series ===
Television drama performances(s)
Year	Title		Role	Notes	Ref.
Year	English	Korean	Role	Notes	Ref.
2015	Heard It Through the Grapevine	풍문으로 들었소	tailor	Bit part (Ep. 9)	
2018	Sky Castle	SKY 캐슬	Do-hoon's mother	Bit part	
2018	Tempted	위대한 유혹자	Ahjumma	Bit part	
2018	KBS Drama Special: "Too Bright for Romance"	드라마 스페셜 - 너무 한낮의 연애	Ahjumma	Bit part	
2018	Mr. Sunshine	미스터 션샤인	Lady Cho's person	Bit part	
2018	Life	라이프	Kim Jung-hee (gynecologist)	Supporting role	
2018	Children of a Lesser God	작은 신의 아이들	Ahjumma	Supporting role	
2019	Doctor Prisoner	닥터 프리즈너	Kim Young-seon (Seon Min-sik's wife)	Supporting role	
2019	Rookie Historian Goo Hae-ryung	신입사관 구해령	Goo Hae Ryung's Teacher	Supporting role	
2019–2020	Black Dog: Being A Teacher	블랙독	Han Jae-hee	Supporting role	
2020	My Unfamiliar Family	(아는 건 별로 없지만) 가족입니다	Yoon Seo-young's mother	Cameo (Ep. 3)	
2021	Voice	보이스	Jang Ye-suk	Cameo (Season 4, Ep. 2–3)	
2021	The Uncanny Counter	경이로운 소문	Inspector Yung [Other world]	Cameo (Season 1, Ep. 9)	
2021	Hometown Cha-Cha-Cha	갯마을 차차차	Lee Myung-shin	Supporting role	
2022	Bloody Heart	붉은 단심	Queen In-young	Supporting role	
2022	Link: Eat, Love, Kill	링크: 먹고 사랑하라, 죽이게	Jang Mi-sun	Supporting role	
2022–2023	The First Responders	소방서 옆 경찰서	Dok Go-soon	Supporting role; Season 1–2	
2024	Jeongnyeon: The Star Is Born	정년이	Jeong Nam-hee	Supporting role	
2025	Motel California	모텔 캘리포니아	Hwang Jeong-gu	Supporting role	

=== Web drama ===
Web drama performances(s)
Year	Title		Role	Notes
Year	English	Korean	Role	Notes
2022	The King of Pigs	돼지의 왕	Kim Cheol's mother	TVING
2022	The Sound of Magic	안나라수마나라	Seo Ha-yeon's Mother	Netflix

=== Television shows ===
Television show performance(s)
Year	Title		Role	Note	Ref.
Year	English	Korean	Role	Note	Ref.
2022	Hot Singers	뜨거운 씽어즈	Cast Member	JTBC Variety Show	
2022	58th Baeksang Arts Awards	제58회 백상예술대상	Choir	Broadcast by JTBC	

== Stage ==
=== Musical ===
Musical performance(s)
Year	Title		Role	Theater	Date	Ref.
Year	English	Korean	Role	Theater	Date	Ref.
1999–2000	MBC Family Musical Lulu and the Twelve Fairies - A Beautiful Winter Story	MBC 가족뮤지컬 루루와 열두 요정 - 아름다운 겨울 이야기	Rabbit, Fairy of August	Sejong Center for the Performing Arts small theater	December 24, 1999 – January 30, 2000	

=== Theater ===
Theater play performance(s)
Year	Title		Role	Theater	Date	Ref.
Year	English	Korean	Role	Theater	Date	Ref.
1998	An Enemy of the People	민중의 적	Petra	Sejong Center for Performing Arts	March 20 – April 6	
2000	(1st) Two-Person Theater Festival	(제1회) 2인극 페스티벌	Jeon clan, woman, Sadangpa 2	Dongsung Art Center	August 5 – September 24	
2001	Navillera in Cheongsan - A new aspect of our theater where Hanbok and Sijo Chang are harmonized	청산에 나빌레라 - 한복과 시조창이 어우러지는 우리 연극의 새로운 모습	Chorus, Jin-mo, Gisaeng 3	Arts and Culture Center small theater	September 15–25	
2001	Lee	이	Woo-in, musician, court lady	Yeonwoo Theater	November 8 – December 9	
2001	Welcome to Baebijang House	Welcome to 배비장하우스	wife, Ae-Ryeon et al.	Batangol Small Theater Yeonwoo Theater	March 27 – April 22	
2001	(2001) Seoul Children's and Youth Performing Arts Festival—Light of Love	(2001) 서울 아동청소년 공연예술축제—사랑의 빛		Yeonwoo Theater	July 11 – August 26	
2001	(2001) SPAF Seoul Performing Arts Festival: Lee	(2001) SPAF 서울공연예술제: 이	Woo-in, musician, court lady	Arts and Culture Center grand theater	October 13–18	
2002	Korean Wooturi	우리나라 우투리	a pulgaksiori child, a shaman	Seoul Arts Center Jayu Small Theater	August 23 – September 1	
2003	That Guy Looks Like a Radish	저 사람 무우당 같다		Cultural Arts Promotion Agency Arts Theater Hakjeon Blue Small Theater	April 4–20	
2003	That Guy Looks Like a Radish - Encore performance	저 사람 무우당 같다 - 앵콜공연		Yeonwoo Theater	Apr 25 – May 25	
2005	Living as a Cool Couple	부부 쿨하게 살기	Kang Yoo-jeong	The Byeoloreum Theater of the National Theater of Korea	March 10 – April 9	
2006	When a Man Loves a Woman	남자가 여자를 사랑할때	Nam-soo	Arko Arts Theater Small Theater	June 16 – July 2	
2006	Three Penny Opera	서푼짜리 오페라	Jenny	Seoul Arts Center Towol Theater	November 16 – December 3	
2007	Memories of a Summer Day	여름날의 기억 (중국)	Chiuzi	Arko Arts Theater Small Theater	April 4–8	
2007	I'm not Talking about Love	연애얘기아님	Seon-hee	Daehangno Guerilla Theater	June 13 – July 1	
2008	I'm not Talking about Love	연애얘기아님	Seon-hee	Daehangno Small Theater Festival	February 14 – April 13	
2008	The person who lives in Gampo, Deok-i, and Yeol-su	감포 사는 분이, 덕이열수	Boon	Daehangno Seondol Theater	October 17 – November 16	
2009	The person who lives in Gampo, Deok-i, and Yeol-su	감포 사는 분이, 덕이열수	Boon	Daehangno Seondol Theater	April 13 – May 17	
2009	We Loved Too Much to Meet Everyday	매일 만나기에는 우리는 너무나 사랑했었다		The cultural space of Daehangno, Seoul	August 27–30	
2009–2010	Ask The Blind Father for Direction	눈먼아비에게 길을 묻다	aunt	Daehangno Seondol Theater	Sep 25 – Jan 24	
2010	Jjilji is a new wave	찌질이 신파극	Geum-suk	Yeonwoo Small Theater	March 17 – April 3	
2010	The person who lives in Gampo, Deok-i, and Yeol-su - Official entry for the 2010 Seoul Theater Festival	감포 사는 분이, 덕이열수 - 2010 서울연극제 공식 참가작	Boon	Arko Arts Theater Small Theater	May 13–16	
2010	Fighting Woman	싸우는 여자	Woman	Small Pine Theatre Daehakro	June 29 – July 7	
2011	The 32nd Seoul Theater Festival: If There's a Peach Blossom, Pine Flowers Will Fly	(제32회) 서울연극제: 복사꽃 지면 송화 날리고	Mother	Arko Arts Theater Small Theater	May 6–8	
2011–2012	Good News in Our Neighborhood	우리동네 굿뉴스		Daehakro Seondol Theater	Dec 13 – Jan 15	
2012	If There's a Peach Blossom, Pine Flowers Will Fly	복사꽃 지면 송화 날리고	Mother	Daehakro Art Theater Grand Theater	April 7–15	
2012	I miss your parents' faces	니 부모 얼굴이 보고 싶다	Yoo Da-hyun as Mo	Sejong Center for the Performing Arts M Theater	June 24 – July 29	
2012	If There's a Peach Blossom, Pine Flowers Will Fly	복사꽃 지면 송화 날리고	Mother	Daegu Suseong Artpia Paper Hall	August 10–12	
2012	Samguk yusa Project - Extinction	배우 멸	Juk-bang Lady	National Theater Company Baek Baek Hee Jang Minho Theater	November 3–18	
2013	Back in time with Park Wan-seo	박완서와 함께 세월을 거슬러		Daehangno Seondol Theater	January 7 – April 5	
2013	Joke Namsan Arts Center 2013 season self-produced program	농담 농담남산예술센터 2013 시즌 자체제작 프로그램	Carmen	Namsan Art Center Drama Center	April 9–28	
2013	The Grave of Horses	말들의 무덤		Daehakro Arts Theater Grand Theater	September 6–15	
2013	Three Sisters	세 자매	Olga	Seoul Arts Center Jayu Small Theater	November 8 – December 1	
2014	Pep Pep Pep	뺑뺑뺑		Daehangno Seondol Theater	Jun 19 – Jul 6	
2014	Golden Pond	황금연못	Chelsea	Yes 24 Stage 1	September 19 – November 23	
2014	Golden Pond	황금연못	Chelsea	Jeju Art Center	December 27–28	
2015	Golden Pond	황금연못	Chelsea	Daegu Culture and Arts Center Palgong Hall (Grand Theater)	January 17–18	
2015	Golden Pond	황금연못	Chelsea	Ulsan Culture and Arts Center Grand Hall	February 7–8	
2015	Ask for Love	사랑을 묻다		Daehangno Seondol Theater	April 17 – May 24	
2015	Person Who Remembers	생각나는 사람		Daehakro Guerilla Theater	September 2–16	
2015	Stop Abruptly	돌연히 멈춤		Noeul Small Theater	October 1–18	
2015–2016	Hanako	하나코	Seo In-kyung	Arko Arts Theater Small Theater	December 24 – January 10	
2016	Come See Me	배우 날 보러와요	Park Gi-ja	Myeongdong Arts Theater	January 22 – February 21	
2016	Sampoong Department Store	삼풍백화점		Theater Lab 1, Hyehwa-dong	February 24 – March 6	
2016	Three Sisters Born to My Mother	엄마가 낳은 숙이 세 자매	Jeong-suk	Daehakro Beautiful Theater	May 20 – June 12	
2016	Warrior of Sunshine	썬샤인의 전사들	Song Si-chun	Doosan Art Center Space111	September 27 – October 22	
2016	Yanbian Mom	연변엄마	Bok Gil-soon	Theater Lab 1, Hyehwa-dong	December 15–31	
2017	Hanako	하나코	Seo In-kyung	Daehakro Space Owl	February 7–19	
2017	If There's a Peach Blossom, Pine Flowers Will Fly	복사꽃 지면 송화 날리고	Mother	Daehakro Art Theater Small Theater	May 27 – June 4	
2017	Dear Yelena Sergeyevna	존경하는 엘레나 선생님	Yelena Sergeyevna	Art One Theater 3	September 8 – October 15	
2017	Writer's Room Reading Theater: Chinese Wardrobe	2017 작가의 방 낭독극장:중국식옷장	Woman	Small Theater Versions of the National Theater Company	December 11–19	
2018	Doosan Humanities Theater 2018 Altruism - Nassim	두산인문극장 2018 이타주의자 - 낫심		Doosan Art Center Space111	April 10–29	
2018	Doosan Humanities Theater 2018 Altruism - Blood and Seed	두산인문극장 2018 이타주의자 - 피와 씨앗	Sophia	Doosan Art Center Space111	May 8 – June 2	
2018	Foreigner	외국인들	Woman	Salmiro Warehouse Theater	October 5–14	
2018–2019	His and Her Thursday	그와 그녀의 목요일	Yeong-ok	Yegreen Theater	December 15 – February 10	
2019	A Doll's House, Part 2	인형의 집, Part 2	Nora Helmer	LG Art Center	April 10–28	
2019	The Boy in The Last Row	맨 끝줄 소년	Juana	Seoul Arts Center Jayu Small Theater	October 24 – December 1	
2020	Dear Yelena Sergeyevna	존경하는 엘레나 선생님	Yelena Sergeyevna	Hongik University Daehakro Arts Theater Small Theater	June 16 – Sep 6	
2021	Nuran Nuran	누란누란	Professor Sun	Arko Arts Theater Small Theater	January 22–31	
2021	Vincent River	빈센트 리버	Anita	Chungmu Art Center Medium Theater Black	April 27 – July 11	
2021	Dressing Room	분장실	A	Daehakro Jayu Theater	August 7 – September 12	
2022	The Horror Begin	공포가 시작된다	Kitahara Mutsumi	Daehakro Arts Theater Small Theater	May 13–22	
2022	Vincent River	빈센트 리버	Anita	Daehakro Dream Art Center Building 4	July 19 – October 2	

== Discography ==
List of single(s)
Title	Year	Album	Notes	Ref.
"Super Star" (with Seo Yi-sook)	2022	Hot Singers Part 2	Songs were performed in variety show Hot Singers	

== Awards and nominations ==
List of Award(s)
Award		Year	Category	Work	Result	Ref.
Seoul Theater Festival Acting Award		2011	Best Actress Award	Blowing Song Flowers in the Rain	Won	
4th	Korea Drama Awards	2011	Best Actress Award	Blowing Song Flowers in the Rain	Won	
6th	Korea Drama Awards	2013	Best Actress Award	Three Sisters	Won	
Stage Talk Audience's Choice Awards (SACA) (Note: StageTalk Audience's Choice Awards (SACA) is theater and musical award festival that decides the winner based on pure votes from fans of the performance.)		2017	Best Actress Award Theater	Dear Yelena	Won	
SBS Drama Awards		2023	Excellence Award, Actress in a Seasonal Drama	The First Responders 2	Nominated	
