= Vincent River =

Vincent River may refer to:

- Vincent River, a water course now known as French Creek
- Vincent River (play), a play by Philip Ridley, that premiered in 2000
