= Hot Singers =

South Korean reality show

- Promotional poster
- Hangul: 뜨거운 씽어즈
- RR: Tteugeoun ssingeojeu
- MR: Ttŭgŏun ssingŏjŭ
- Genre: Music show; Reality show
- Written by: Mo Eun-seol
- Directed by: Shin Young-gwang
- Starring: Various artists
- Country of origin: South Korea
- Original language: Korean
- No. of seasons: 1
- No. of episodes: 11

Production
- Executive producer: Kim Eun-jung
- Producer: Shin Young-gwang
- Camera setup: Multi-camera

Original release
- Network: JTBC
- Release: March 14 – May 30, 2022

Hot Singers (Korean: 뜨거운 씽어즈; RR: Tteugeoun ssingeojeu) is a South Korean television program that follows the journey of a group of celebrities, coming together to form a choir. The show aired on JTBC every Monday at 9:00 (KST) from March 14 to May 30, 2022.

== Overview ==
Hot Singers depicts a choir challenge among veteran actors in the entertainment industry whose careers add up to some 500 years, to sing in harmony and share their life stories.

Musical director Kim Moon-jeong and singer-songwriter Choi Jung-hoon joined forces to train and lead the choir.

== Cast ==
Choir member

- Kim Young-ok
- Na Moon-hee
- Kim Kwang-kyu
- Jang Hyun-sung
- Lee Jong-hyuk
- Choi Dae-chul
- Lee Byung-joon
- Woo Hyun
- Lee Seo-hwan
- Yoon Yoo-sun
- Woo Mi-hwa
- Kwon In-ha
- Seo Yi-sook
- Park Jun-myeon
- Jun Hyun-moo
- Jung Young-joo

Music director

- Kim Moon-jeong
- Choi Jung-hoon

Guest

- Lee Seok-hoon (Ep. 4)
- La Poem (Ep. 6)

== Original soundtrack ==
Hot Singers (Original Soundtrack)

Soundtrack album by Various Artists
- Released: Part 1: April 12, 2022; Part 2: May 3, 2022; Part 3: May 10, 2022; Part 4: May 17, 2022; Part 5: May 24, 2022
- Recorded: 2022
- Genres: Soundtrack; Ballad; K-pop
- Length: 104:48
- Languages: Korean; English
- Labels: Kakao Entertainment, JTBC, Showplay

Part 1
| No. | Title | Artist | Length |
|---|---|---|---|
| 1. | "My Old Story" | Na Moon-hee | 3:42 |
| 2. | "Shout Myself" | Seo Yi-sook | 4:03 |
| 3. | "Even Though I Loved" | Kim Kwang-kyu | 4:28 |
| 4. | "I Knew I Love" | Yoon Yoo-sun | 3:43 |
| 5. | "It's Only My World" | Choi Dae-chul | 4:48 |
| 6. | "Love is Always Thirsty" | Kwon In-ha | 4:32 |
| 7. | "The Moon of Seoul" | Park Jun-myeon | 3:58 |
| 8. | "I Will Give You Everything" | Jun Hyun-moo | 3:46 |
| 9. | "Lonely Night" | Lee Jong-hyuk | 3:41 |
| 10. | "A Story of a Couple in their 60's" | Kim Young-ok and Woo Hyun | 3:59 |

Part 2
| No. | Title | Artist | Length |
|---|---|---|---|
| 1. | "Uphill" | Lee Seo-hwan | 3:42 |
| 2. | "Your Shampoo Scent In The Flowers" | Yoon Yoo-sun & Jun Hyun-moo | 3:20 |
| 3. | "Holding Onto the End of Tonight" | Kim Kwang-kyu, Jang Hyun-sung & Lee Jong-hyuk | 4:09 |
| 4. | "Super Star" | Seo Yi-sook & Woo Mi-hwa | 3:48 |
| 5. | "No One" | Na Moon-hee & Choi Jung-hoon | 4:28 |
| 6. | "As I Say" | Lee Byung-joon & Lee Seo-hwan | 5:32 |
| 7. | "Don't Leave Me" | Woo Hyun | 3:43 |

Part 3
| No. | Title | Artist | Length |
|---|---|---|---|
| 1. | "Piano Man" | Kim Moon-jeong & Choi Jung-hoon | 2:59 |

Part 4
| No. | Title | Artist | Length |
|---|---|---|---|
| 1. | "Song of the Wind" | Kim Kwang-kyu, Kwon In-ha, Woo Hyun, Lee Seo-hwan & Jang Hyun-sung | 5:35 |
| 2. | "One Fine Spring Day" | Kim Young-ok, Na Moon-hee & Choi Jung-hoon | 3:12 |
| 3. | "Nocturn" | Choi Dae-chul | 3:48 |

Part 5
| No. | Title | Artist | Length |
|---|---|---|---|
| 1. | "A Thousand Winds" | Kim Young-ok | 3:37 |
| 2. | "A Nest" | Lee Byung-joon & Woo Hyun | 3:25 |
| 3. | "If You Come Into My Heart" | Lee Jong-hyuk | 3:41 |

== Ratings ==
Average TV viewership ratings (nationwide)
| Ep. | Original broadcast date | Average audience share (Nielsen Korea) |
|---|---|---|
| 1 | March 14, 2022 | 4.827% (3rd) |
| 2 | March 21, 2022 | 4.28% (3rd) |
| 3 | March 28, 2022 | 3.296% (8th) |
| 4 | April 4, 2022 | 3.106% (7th) |
| 5 | April 11, 2022 | 3.667% (4th) |
| 6 | April 18, 2022 | 3.105% (6th) |
| 7 | May 2, 2022 | 3.885% (3rd) |
| 8 | May 9, 2022 | 3.957% (3rd) |
| 9 | May 16, 2022 | 3.172% (7th) |
| 10 | May 23, 2022 | 3.748% (2nd) |
| 11 | May 30, 2022 | 3.286% (3rd) |
| Average | | 3.666% |
The blue numbers represent the lowest ratings and the red numbers represent the highest ratings.; This show airs on a cable networks (paid television) which normally has a relatively smaller audience compared to shows broadcast (free-to-air) on public networks as KBS, SBS, MBC or EBS.
