= Baekse-ju =

Korean glutinous rice-based wine

Baekseju
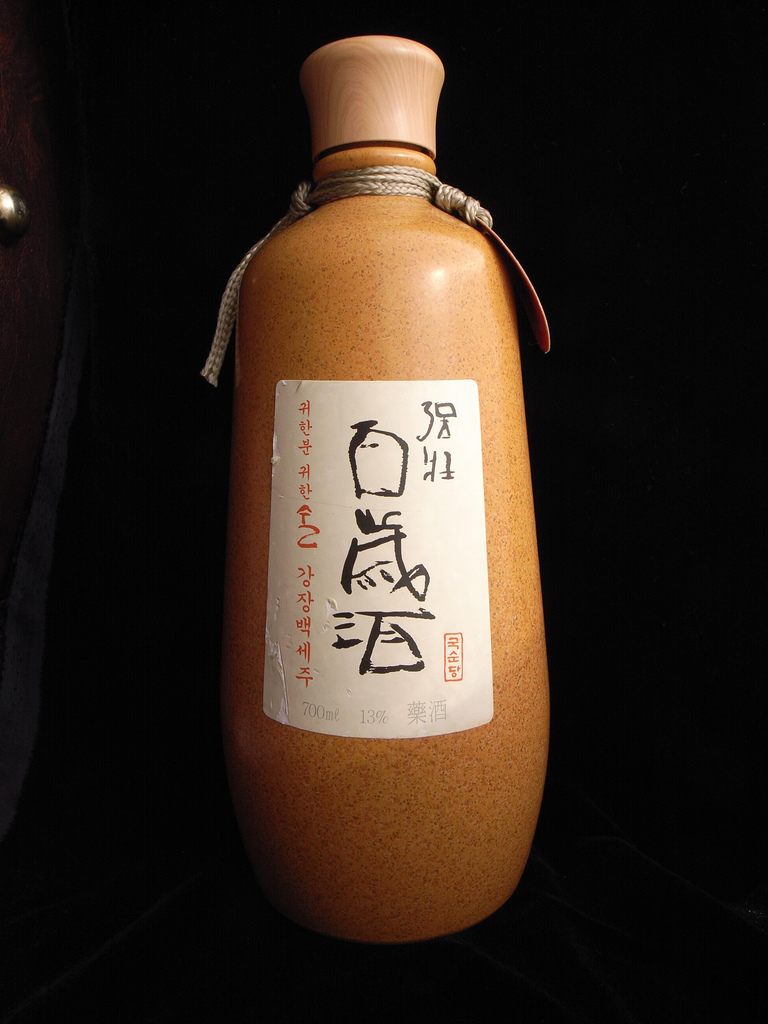
- Origin: Korea
- Ingredients: Glutinous rice

Korean name
- Hangul: 백세주
- Hanja: 百歲酒
- RR: baekseju
- MR: paekseju
- IPA: pɛ̝k̚.s͈e̞.dʑu

Baekseju (Korean: 백세주; sold under the brand name Bek Se Ju) is a Korean glutinous rice-based fermented alcoholic beverage flavored with a variety of herbs, with ginseng most prominent among them. The name comes from the legend that the healthful herbs in baekseju will allow an individual to live up to 100 years old.

The drink is infused with ginseng and eleven other herbs, including licorice, omija (Schisandra chinensis), gugija (Chinese wolfberry), Astragalus propinquus root, ginger, and cinnamon.

== Overview ==
Baekseju is brewed using traditional methods, and has a mellow flavor, with a hint of ginseng.

It is often consumed with gui and other spicy dishes which are the main flavors of Korean food. However, baekseju is considered to be more old-fashioned than soju or beer, and is less popular.

Kooksoondang's brand of baekseju used a modified version of its traditional recipe to sell it to a broader market, with some adjustments and new ingredients. It was first launched in 1992 along with the name of Jibong'yuseol.

== See also ==
- Korean wine
- List of Korean beverages
