= Kooksoondang =

South Korean brewery

Kook Soon Dang
- Founded: 1952
- Headquarters: Samsung-dong, Gangnam District, Seoul, South Korea
- Key people: Bae Jung-ho, President
- Products: yakju bekseju bekseju dry kang jang bekseju 50seju

Korean name
- Hangul: 국순당
- Hanja: 麴醇堂
- RR: Guksundang
- MR: Kuksundang
- Website: www.ksdb.co.kr

Kooksoondang (Korean: 국순당) is a South Korean brewery, founded in 1952. The name translates in English to "house of good yeast and wines."

Kooksoondang is a major producer of natural beverages and health-related products. In 1994, Mr. Jung-Ho Bae, CEO of the company, revamped the benefits of a traditional wine Koreans have been enjoying for many years, mixing modern technology with an original recipe, and produced Bek Se Ju.

The drink has a unique fermentation method for the brewing of rice wine. Unlike the regular methods of producing rice wine, Kooksoondang grinds raw rice with nuruk (Korean traditional fermentation starter) and brews them without steaming.

Kooksoondang Brewery has been involved in exporting since 1994, and in 2003, the company took over Haitai & Company. The company's current president is Bae Jung Ho.

Kooksoondang has been exported to over 35 countries around the world.

The export volumes reached over $5 million in 2005.

In Canada, the main distributor is CoBees Enterprise Ltd., which is located in Port Moody, British Columbia.

== History ==
Establishment of the base of the Korean liquor industry by improving the enzyme through the use of the state-of-the-art technology
1970–1985

- 1970-04. Founded Korea Microbial Research Laboratory (Baehan Industry)
- 1970-04. Started to produce and sell the wheat bran gokja (a kind of nuruk)

(cultivation of three kinds of spawns (Rhizopus sp, Asp. usamii, and Asp. oryzae) and two kinds of mature seeds)

- 1973-01. Founded Rice Wine Research Laboratory
- 1975-01. Started to sell the enzyme for alcohol
- 1975-01. Started to produce and sell GURO 60 for takju
- 1975-01. Published the first issue of Tae Yang Rice Wine Technical Periodical
- 1980. Started to produce and sell GURO 210 (an enzyme for making alcohol from barley)
- 1982. <Acquisition of a special patent> Brown-rice-wine manufacturing method with raw-rice fermentation (179660)
- 1983-02. Changed the company name to Baehan Co., Ltd.
- 1983-05. Started to sell GU 210
- 1985-02. (Parent application) A method of making alcohol by fermenting raw barley or wheat

Creation of a new business area by a stabilized technology
1986–1993

- 1986-01. Began to build a manufacturing factory in Suwon
- 1986-02. <Acquisition of license> Development of a method of making alcohol by fermenting raw rye

(Office of Korea Tax Administration)

- 1986-07. Established its affiliate Enzyme Research Laboratory of Baehan Co,. Ltd.

(approved by the Ministry of Science and Technology, #233)

- 1986-09. Completed the construction of its manufacturing factory in Suwon Started to produce refined enzymes
- 1987-04. Held the Third Takju Manufacturing Technology Seminar
- 1987-04. Started to sell "Dongdongju" made from fermented raw rice (for the Korean Americans in the U.S.)
- 1988-05. Published the takju brewery technology (edited Tae Yang Wine Technical Periodical issue #33)
- 1988-05. Launched the new product Ijohukju (Gangneung, Gangwon-do)
- 1988-05. Published the first issue of Tae Yang Rice Wine Technical Periodical
- 1989-07. Held the first yakju manufacturing technology seminar
- 1990-02. Established the Baehan Scholarship Association, which encourages research on the culture of drinking (Hanyang University)
- 1992-05. Launched the new product Bekseju
- 1992-09. Launched the new product Hekju Soon
- 1992-12. Changed the name of the company to Kook Soon Dang Co., Ltd.
- 1992-12. Inauguration of CEO Jung-ho Bae
- 1993-01. Launched the new product Biotak (canned makkoli made via raw-rice fermentation)
- 1993-01. Launched the new product Kangjang Bekseju
- 1993-07. Acquired Taegaewon Factory (Daedong Brewery) in Namyangju, Gyeonggi Province

Adopting traditions to the present
1994–1999

- 1994-01. Started to sell Bekseju and Hukju nationwide (abolished the restrictions on the areas where liquor can be supplied)
- 1994-02. Became the first national wholesaler recruit
- 1994-03. Was selected as the official traditional wine of "The Year of National Classical Music (1994)"
- 1994-04. Started to export Biotak (canned makkoli made via raw-rice fermentation)
- 1994-04. Opened an office in Seoul (sales headquarters)
- 1994-05. Entered an agreement to export US$0.5-million-worth takju and yakju to the U.S. (New York Cheongha Corporation)
- 1994-07. Started to export Biotak to New York and Chicago in the U.S.
- 1994-12. Acquired a "New-Technology Mark" (KT Mark, KT00001, Ministry of Science and Technology)
- 1995-03. Started to export Takju Arirang to Japan
- 1995-06. Obtained approval as a company-affiliated institute (Korean Industrial Technology Association, Issue #952168)
- 1996-10. Launched Kooksoondang Salmakkoli (240ml, canned)
- 1997-05. Introduced Bekseju (375ml) in the market
- 1998-01. Moved Brewery in Taegaewon to Suwon
- 1998-03. Acquired the very first venture enterprise certificate in the brewery market in South Korea
- 1999-12. Acquired an ISO9002 mark

The most popular and representative wine of Korea
2000–2010

- 2000-03. Obtained another venture certificate (deemed an outstanding venture company)
- 2000-03. Received the outstanding Corporate Research Center Award from the Minister of Health in its 30th anniversary celebration
- 2000-06. Its company headquarters was moved to Samseong-dong, Kangnam-gu
- 2000-08. The company stock was listed at Kosdaq (the stock trade started on August 24)
- 2000-08. Challenge 21C – announcement of Kook Soon Dang's new vision
- 2000-08. Received the silver medal at the Traditional Korean Food Show (traditional-liquor section)
- 2001-03. Opened "Bekse Jumak" (Open (an Internet community at freechal.com))
- 2001-08. <Patent application>A method for manufacturing high-quality wine(10-2001-0047822)
- 2001-10. Japanese subsidiary was launched (Bekseju Japan)
- 2001-11. Was awarded the President's Prize in the "Traditional Korean Food BEST 5"

(Ministry of Food, Agriculture, Forestry, and Fisheries)

- 2002-01. Opened the first Bekseju Village store (franchise)
- 2002-02. Built the computer-aided wholesale store management system
- 2002-03. CEO Jung-ho Bae was given the Iron Tower Industry Medal
- 2002-06. Passed the sanitary inspections conducted by the 8th U.S. Army
- 2002-07. Launched a new corporate image marketing campaign to strengthen its image as a company that values people's well-being
- 2002-09. Managed the development and revival of traditional Korean Wines

("We are looking for beautiful Wine": Finding out how to make traditional Wine, which is in danger of disappearing)

- 2002-10. Established PLMS (paperless meeting system)
- 2003-03. Acquired HAITAI & Company
- 2003-05. Bekseju won the silver prize at the liquor contest in the Shanghai International Food & Beverage Trade Fair
- 2003-08. Increased its share capital (free issue of new shares)
- 2003-09. Was named "Excellent Company" by New Labor-Management Culture (Suwon District Office of Kyeongin Regional Labor Office)
- 2003-11. Launched "Samgyeopsare Memilhanjan" (pork with a cup of buckwheat drink)
- 2003-12. Kook Soon Dang's CEO, Jung-ho Bae, was named one of the top CEOs of the year by Korea Business Weekly
- 2003-12. Won a distribution prize from KOSAMART Co., Ltd.
- 2004-06. Opened Heongseong Plant
- 2004-06. Was cited the most respected firm in the alcoholic-beverage industry by Korea Management Association Consulting
- 2004-12. Held a press conference to announce that Bekseju contains ingredients that can suppress cancer and that can protect the stomach
- 2005-01. Announced the mission of Kook Soon Dang
- 2005-04. Opened Beijing Beksejuga(白歳酒家) (a traditional Korean food and liquor restaurant)
- 2005-05. Released a new version of "Bekseju"
- 2005-08. Launched the new product Charyeju (liquor for a feast for the Korean ancestors)
- 2005-10. Won the first place in "Consumer Well-Being Quotient" (KWCI)
- 2005-11. Launched the new product AORA
- 2006-02. Launched the new product Byul (Star)
- 2006-04. Established Beijing Baisui Trading Co., Ltd.
- 2006-06. Was designated as the "2006 Corporate Governance Superior Firm" (Corporate Governance Services)
- 2006-07. Launched Bekseju Village, Geumkang Mountain branch in North Korea
- 2006-08. Launched the new products "Omi-Yeongjak" and "Oga-myeongjak"
- 2007-01. Launched the new product "Drought Bekseju 13"
- 2007-02. Awarded gold and silver medals at prod Expo, Moscow, Russia for Kangjang Bekseju and Bekseju
- 2007-05. Bekseju won the silver prize at the liquor contest in the Shanghai International Food & Beverage Trade Fair
- 2007-05. Started the bottle deposit refund system
- 2007-05. Kangjang Bekseju and Bekseju won the silver prize at the liquor contest in the Shanghai SIAL International Food & Beverage Trade Fair
- 2007-05. Launched the new product "Mimong"
- 2007-07. Was named an "Environment-friendly Company" by the Ministry of Environment
- 2007-07. Launched the new products "Myungjak Omija", "Myungjak Ogaza", "Myungjak Bokbunja", and "Myungjak Sangwang Mushroom
- 2007-09. One of its wine products was named "The Greatest Wine of Korea" (National Tax Service)
- 2007-10. Won the third place in the 2007 Korean Digital Management Awards 2007
- 2007-10. Launched the PET product "kooksoondang Salmakgoli"
- 2007-11. Launched the new product Bekseju Dry
- 2008-01. Launched the new product"50 SEJU"
- 2008-05. Revived "Changpoju" through the "Reviving Traditional Wines"Project
- 2008-06. "Gangjang Bekseju" was selected as the official toast wine for the OECD Ministerial Meeting
- 2008-08. Revived "Ewhju" and "Jaju" through the "Reviving Traditional Wines" Project
- 2008-10. Revived "Shindoju through the "Reviving Traditional Wines" Project
- 2008-12. Launched the new products "pear makkoli", Pear Distilled Liquor, and Pear Wine
- 2009-02. Revived "Songjeolju" through the "Reviving Traditional Wines" Project
- 2009-03. Entered into an agreement with Cultural Properties Administration regarding the "One Custodian for Cultural Assets" *2009-03. Project

(sponsored the Chosun dynasty royal foods Koonjoong byunggwa and myunchun dugyunju, which are traditional Korean wines)

- 2009-04. Revived "Sogoju" through the "Reviving Traditional Wines" Project
- 2009-04. Launched the new product "KOOKSOONDANG DRAUGHT MAKKOLI" (a Korean wine)
- 2009-05. Revived "Yaksanchoon" through the "Reviving Traditional Wines" Project
- 2009-06. Launched the new product "JAYANG BEKSEJU"
- 2009-08. "KANGJANG BEKSEJU" was selected as the official toasting wine for the Global Environment Forum
- 2009-08. "KOOKSOONDANG DRAUGHT MAKKOLI" was selected as the official toasting wine for the ICEE ICEER 2009 KOREA
- 2009-08. Revived "MIRIMJU" through the "Reviving Traditional Wines" Project
- 2009-09. "KOOKSOONDANG DRAUGHT MAKKOLI" was selected as the official toasting wine for the GREEN KOREA, EATOF (East-Asia union kangwon assembly forum)
- 2009-10. Revived "SANGSIMJU" through the "Reviving Traditional wines" Project
- 2009-10. "JAYANG BEKSEJU" was selected as the official toasting wine for the IAC2009 Daejeon KOREA
- 2009-10. "MIMONG" was selected as the official toasting wine for the IASDR2009
- 2009-11. Launched the new product "CLARIFIELD BEKSE MAKKOLI"
- 2009-12. Revived "rice meoru wine" through the "Reviving Traditional Wines"project
- 2009-12. Opened "WOORISOOLSANG" (a traditional Korean food and liquor restaurant)
- 2009-12. "MIMONG" was selected as the official toasting wine for the Design Korea
- 2010-01. Launched the new product "50 SEJU"
- 2010-05. Revived "Changpoju" through the "Reviving Traditional Wines"Project
- 2010-06. "Gangjang Bekseju" was selected as the official toast wine for the OECD Ministerial Meeting
- 2010-08. Revived "Ewhaju" and "Jaju" through the "Reviving Traditional Wines" Project
- 2010-10. Revived "Shindoju through the "Reviving Traditional Wines" Project
- 2010-12. Launched the new products "Pear makkoli", Pear Distilled Liquor, and Pear Wine

== Project ==
"Project for Reviving Traditional Korean Wines" aims to revive parts of the traditional Korean culture and the traditional Korean wines that have already been forgotten.

The company has revived the traditional Korean wines that have already been forgotten, dating back to the period of the Japanese occupation, and has showcased them in BEKSEJU Village.

Korean ancestors used to brew wines with ingredients that had been produced during certain seasons, and the brewing method differed from one province or family to another. This is called "Gayangju culture". Since time immemorial, therefore, the kinds of wines in Korea have already been very diverse, but during the Japanese occupation and the war that ensued after the liberation, and in the process of economic development, many of these wines disappeared. At present, there are 600 types of wines that there are records of.

To systematically revive and reinterpret the culture of traditional Korean wines and the side dishes for wines that are already in danger of disappearing, Koonsoondang carried out the "project for Reviving Traditional Korean Wines" to fulfill its responsibility as the leading company in the Korean traditional-wine industry, and to modify the current twisted drinking culture in the country.

The first revival was accomplished in 2008. Different kinds of sesiju or wines related to the four seasons and folk customs were revived. The second round of revivals was carried out in 2009, with focus on the representative wine of each era (Three Kingdoms, Koryo, Chosun dynasty).

The research laboratories of Kook Soon Dang have made the necessary preparations for the effort to revive the traditional Korean wines over a period of three years. The "Project for Reviving Traditional Korean Wines" aims to revive parts of the traditional Korean culture and the traditional Korean wines that have already been forgotten.

== Brands ==
=== Bekseju ===
1. Bekseju - Baekseju (sold under the brand name Bek Se Ju; literally "one-hundred-years wine") is a Korean glutinous rice-based fermented alcoholic beverage flavored with a variety of herbs. According to some, the name comes from the legend that the healthful herbs in baekseju will help you live to be 100 years old. The drink is infused with ginseng and eleven other herbs, including licorice, omija (Schisandra chinensis), gugija (Chinese wolfberry), Astragalus propinquus root, ginger, and cinnamon.
2. Bekseju dry – is a no-sugar wine that is not sweet and that revives the dry and pure taste of certain foods.
3. Kangjang bekseju – Made from more than twice the amount of herbs in the original BEKSEJU, the premium KANGJANG BEKSE JU is brewed with the finest and unique traditional method, using ginseng as the major ingredient plus 9 other valuable herbs that are all cultivated in Korea.
4. Jayang bekseju – The 12 Oriental herbs used for JAYANG BEKSEJU were selected based on the five prescriptions of Dong Ui Bo Gam (Principles and Practice of Eastern Medicine) and were made into the JAYANG BEKSEJU medicinal wine. The wine's 30-day maturation makes a deep and strong taste.
5. The legend of bekseju – once upon a time, there was a nobleman who was riding through a town. On his way, he witnessed the most unusual sight. A young man was beating an old man who seemed to be his father! The nobleman stopped his horse to scold the young man. "How dare you hit that helpless old man!" The young man turned around and said, "This is my son who was born when I was 80 years old. I told him to drink the wine but he didn't take my advice. Now he has grown older than I am." The nobleman bowed down in humility before the young man, asking what the miraculous drink might be. The young man told the nobleman about BEKSEJU, a special wine made from 12 kinds of oriental herbs, including Korean Ginseng.

=== 50seju ===
50seju is brewed with quality rice. Korean traditional rice wine.

=== Yedam Charyeju ===
Yedam Charyeju is especially made for ancestor worship ceremonies.

=== Myungjak ===
1. Myungjak sanghwang – This is a wine made from natural Sanghwang Mushroom that grows on Mulberry trees in the wild. The mushroom(Phellinus Linteus) is a medicinal mushroom widely used in Korea, Japan and China. It was selected as one of the World's 10 Anti-cancer Effect food by U.S FDA in 2002.
2. Myungjak Bokbunja – This wine is made of Black Raspberry(BOKBUNJA) which has been known as a stimulant for sex drive. Women may also get some effects on promoting healthy skin and ision, as well as protection for the heart and liver.
3. Myungjak omija – This is a naturally fermented wine from Omija (Schisandra chinensis fruit) which has been used for tonic medicine for a long time in many Asian countries. Omija strengthens the heart and immune system, reduces blood pressure and relieves coughs and helps in brightening and clearing the skin by aiding in blood circulation.
4. Myungjak ogaja – This is a naturally fermented wine from Ogaja (Siberian Ginseng's Fruit). Prized for its ability to restore vigor, increase longevity, strengthen the immune system, and stimulate both appetite and memory, Siberian Ginseng is widely used in Russia to help the body adapt when being subjected to stressful conditions.

=== Rice makkoli ===
A traditional alcoholic beverage in Korea, it is a milky rice wine with a creamy consistency and sweet taste.

1. Canned makkoli - Using an extended fermentation process, the taste and aroma of this wine has been richly refined. Since this rice wine is canned, it becomes bacteria-free and it can be stored for 1year.
2. Draught makkoli - The ability of Kooksoondang's Draught makkoli to hold its extraordinary quality and freshness for such a prolonged period of time lies in the nation's first utilized controlled fermentation method.
3. Mimong - Its name means 'The dream of the rice'. With the use of special nuruk, it is made to exude the ancient Korean traditional rice wine taste. It gains popularity in Japan as well as Korea.
4. Ehwaju – It was named as such because it is made when the pear blossoms come out. It has a unique taste that is sweet, sour and savory with a deep rich natural flavor of ripe pear. The texture is very thick and creamy like that of yogurt. Notably, "Ehwa" makkoli has a long history as it had been enjoyed among the upper-classes during the Koryo Dynasty (918~1392).

=== Others ===
1. Korean Ginseng Liquor - It is original ginseng liquor made through long-time ripening of selected four year old Korean Ginseng.
2. Cham Soon - Korean distilled spirits "CHARM SOON" is a soju made with 100% pure water that allows for an exceptionally smooth taste.
3. Ginseng wine - Made from ripe grapes and Korean ginseng extract, GINSENG WINE is a healthy sweet wine that can be enjoyed at any place and with any food
4. Ginseng & Cognac - Oriental and Western's delicate combination GINSENG & COGNAC.

== R&D ==
The research laboratories of Kooksoondang

The research laboratories have made the necessary preparations for the effort to revive the traditional Korean wines over a period of three years. So the laboratories aim to modernize and popularize them.

== Patent ==
Kooksoondang has 12 patents for brewing.

== Environmental Record ==
The company has been selected as the first green company from the industry by the Ministry of Environment.

- The company has used Fermentation of raw rice to reduce the carbon dioxide which is environmentally friendly manufacturing processes.
- The company keeps a rigorous rule that the wastewater have to be the second grade of feed water. The rest of product is also used as animal feed and compost. Plants have 3steps treatment process of wastewater and the pollution level is automatically checked by the real time monitoring system.

== Experience ==
Bekseju Village is a kind of a brew pub that serves Korean alcoholic beverages and the restored prestigious traditional Bekseju wine.

There are 10 Bekseju Villages in South Korea.

== See also ==
- Economy of South Korea
