= ŠKUC Theatre =

Coordinates: 46°2′49.49″N 14°30′24.05″E

SKUC Theater (ŠKUC gledališče) is a member of the Student Cultural Center Ljubljana (ŠKUC).

== About ŠKUC organization ==
ŠKUC is a non-governmental organization promoting non-profit cultural and artistic activity in Slovenia. Its beginnings date back to Ljubljana's radical student movement of 1968. However, the theater was not formally established until January 31, 1972. In the late 1970s and in the 1980s, ŠKUC was one of the key supporters and promoters of alternative culture. Today, ŠKUC supports young artists by collaborating with them in the cultural sphere and organizing activities for young people. ŠKUC's activities also include providing information and counseling for young people, including education, a library, archives, social affairs, prevention, sociology, humanism, and research activities. It has also gained the status of an association working in the public interest in health care.

== About ŠKUC Theater ==
The theater section began in the late 1980s with street and ambient performances. The first generation produced some of today's well-recognized theatre actors and groups. The ŠKUC Theatre again came to life in 2000 after a long period of inactivity. Conceptually, its work focuses on so-called 'chamber performances' with the guiding principle that such theater involve young, professional artists, and students of production and the dramatic arts. The selection of dramaturgical texts is based on staging world premieres and debut performances in Slovenia, as well as texts dealing with the problems of marginalized groups in society. The annual production comprises three performances of its own production or in co-production with other groups and theatre houses. ŠKUC's Art Manager is Alen Jelen.
