= Vincent River (play) =

Play written by Philip Ridley

- Original language: English
- Written by: Philip Ridley
- Characters: Anita (female); Davey (male)
- Subject: Hate crime: homophobia
- Setting: "A run-down flat in Dagenham, East London"

Premiere
- Date: 6 September 2000
- Place: Hampstead Theatre, London

Vincent River is a one act stage play by Philip Ridley. It was Ridley's fourth stage play and premiered at the Hampstead Theatre, London on 6 September 2000. The production was the last major collaboration between Ridley and director Mathew Lloyd, who had previously directed the majority of Ridley's other theatrical works.

== Plot ==
The story plays out in realtime and is set in a rundown flat in Dagenham.

A woman called Anita is moving in following the death of Vincent, her son who was killed in a homophobic attack, which resulted in her discovering that he was a homosexual.

In the play, she interacts with Davey, a boy who claims to have been the first to find Vincent's corpse and who wants to know as much as he can about Vincent from Anita.

== Notable stage productions ==
Country	Date	Location	People	Details
England	6 September 2000	The Hampstead Theatre, London	Directed by Matthew Lloyd.: Anita - Julie Legrand; Davey - William Mannering	World premiere
Slovenia	26 October 2007	SKUC Theatre, Ljubljana	Directed by Alen Jelen.: Anita - Zvezdana Mlakar; Davey - Jure Henigman	Slovenian premiere
England	30 October 2007	Trafalgar Studios, London	Directed by Rebecca McCuheon.: Anita - Lynda Bellingham; Davey - Mark Field	West End premiere
America	10 June 2008	59E59 Theaters, New York	Directed by Steve Marmion.: Anita - Deborah Findlay; Davey - Mark Field	American premiere Performed as part of the Brits Off-Broadway festival.
Australia	4 January 2009	Tamarama Rock Surfers, Bondi Beach	Directed by Jonathan Wald.: Anita - Elaine Hudson; Davey - Beejan Land	Australian premiere
England	18 May 2010	Landor Theatre, London	Presented by Thomas Hopkins and Theatrica Ltd. Directed by Robert McWhir.: Anita - Nicola Duffett; Davey - Elliott Jordan	"10th anniversary production" (2010 London revival)
England	2 November 2010	Old Red Lion Theatre, London	Presented by Charmers productions. Directed by Gary Reid.: Anita - Debra C.Barker; Davey - Frank Keogh	2010 London revival (2nd London revival of 2010): Shortlisted for the 2011 London Festival Fringe Best Play Award.
Israel	7 August 2015	Tahel Theatre	Anita - Meyrav Gruber; Davey - Avi Mazliah	Israeli premiere
England	27 February 2018	The Hope Mill Theatre, Manchester.	Directed by John Young.: Anita - Joyce Branagh; Davey - Dominic Holmes	England "regional premiere" (Manchester 2018)
England	20 March 2018	The Park Theatre, London.	Directed by Robert Chevara.: Anita - Louise Jameson; Davey - Thomas Mahy	2018 London revival: Louise Jameson received the 2019 Offie for 'Best Female Performance In A Play'.
Wales	19 September 2018	A site-specific production at Jacob's Market, Cardiff	Produced by No Boundaries Theatre. Directed by Luke Hereford.: Anita - Victoria Pugh; Davey - Aly Cruickshank	2018 Cardiff production
America	28 November 2018	The Crane Theater Studio, Minneapolis, MN	Produced by Arrow Theater. Directed by Grant Sorenson: Anita - Laura Esping; Davey - Cole Seager	First US non-festival production.
Australia	13 October 2020	Christ Church, Milton, Brisbane	Produced by The Curators' Theatre Directed by Michael Beh: Anita - Amanda McErlean; Davey - Patrick Shearer	Queensland premiere: Major revival; 5-star reviews
America	22 September 2021	Richard Triangle Players, Virginia.	Produced by Richmond Triangle Players Directed by Vinnie Gozalez: Anita - Jill Bari Steinberg; Davey - Keaton Hillman	Virginia, USA premiere
Belgium	20 October 2021	The Bridge Theatre, Burssels	Produced by the Bridge Theatre, Brussels. Directed by Robert Chevara: Anita - Jo Castledon; Davey - Jake McDaid	2021 Belgium premiere
England	14 October 2022	Hope Mill Theatre, Manchester	Produced by Green Carnation Directed by Dan Ellis and Dan Jarvis: Anita - Maddy Myles; Davey - Rory McMenamin	Manchester revival 2022
England	23 June 2023	Greenwich Theatre, London	Produced by the Greenwich Theatre Directed by James Haddrell: Anita - Kerrie Taylor; Davey - Brandon Kimarya	2023 London Revival

== On film ==
In 2005 Marianne Epin and Cyrille Thouvenin starred in the play at the Théâtre du Marais in Paris, which was also filmed and released as a television movie. It is available on region 2 DVD.

The play has been compared to the 2014 film Lilting, starring Ben Whishaw, Cheng Pei Pei and Andrew Leung and written and directed by Hong Khaou. The story, similar to the play, is about a man who approaches the mother of his deceased gay lover to try and connect and understand their loss.
