= Jannabi discography =

Singer discography

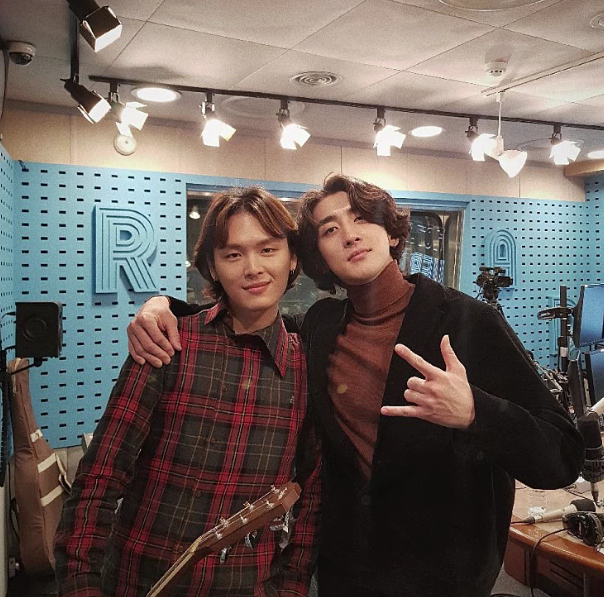
- Jannabi in 2019
- Studio albums: 5
- EPs: 3
- Singles: 13
- Music videos: 15
- Promotional Singles: 3
- Soundtrack appearances: 9

South Korean indie rock band Jannabi has released four studio albums, three extended plays, fifteen music videos, and thirteen singles. Formed in 2012 by vocalist Choi Jung-hoon, guitarist Kim Do-hyung, and pianist Yoo Young-hyun, Jannabi debuted with "Rocket" in April 2014 under the independent record label Peponi Music, headed by Choi's older brother.

The band's first EP, See Your Eyes, was released in December 2014. In 2015, bassist Jang Kyung-joon and drummer Yoon Kyul joined the group. Their debut studio album, Monkey Hotel, followed in August 2016 and peaked at number forty-one in South Korea. Their second studio album, Legend, with its lead single "For Lovers Who Hesitate", which was their last to be recorded with Young-hyun, was released in March 2019 and created an unprecedented sensation in South Korea. The album peaked at number seven on the Circle Album Chart, while the title track peaked atop the Circle Digital Chart and received double platinum certification by the Korea Music Content Association (KMCA) after accumulating more than 200 million streams. The band released a second EP, Jannabi's Small Pieces I, which was recorded by Choi and Kim alone, in November 2020. The EP peaked at number thirteen on the Circle Album Chart. The duo continued to record together and released their third studio album, The Land of Fantasy, in July 2021. The album peaked at number six in their native country. In 2022, the band's third EP after Yoon Kyul's departure and two members in military service, Jannabi's Small Pieces II: Grippin'TheGreen, was released with Choi's solitary songwriting. The EP peaked at number fifteen in South Korea.

Over the course of their career, Jannabi has scored three studio albums that peaked in the top ten and eight singles on the Circle Chart. Jannabi is listed as one of South Korea's best-selling groups that debuted in 2014.

== Albums ==
=== Studio albums ===
List of studio albums, with selected chart positions and sales
Title	Album details	Peak chart positions	Sales
Title	Album details	KOR	Sales
Monkey Hotel	Original version: Released: August 4, 2016; Label: Peponi Music; Format: CD, digital download	41	KOR: 1,041
Monkey Hotel	Special edition: Released: May 2, 2018; Label: Peponi Music; Format: CD, digital download	10	KOR: 9,601
Legend (전설)	Released: March 13, 2019; Label: Peponi Music; Format: CD, LP, digital download	7	KOR: 16,957
The Land of Fantasy (환상의 나라)	Released: July 28, 2021; Label: Peponi Music; Format: CD, LP, digital download	6	KOR: 13,761
Sound of Music Pt. 1	Released: April 28, 2025; Label: Peponi Music; Format: CD, LP, digital download	22	KOR: 9,985
Sound of Music Pt. 2: Life	Released: October 21, 2025; Label: Peponi Music; Format: CD, LP, digital download	28	KOR: 6,990

== Extended plays ==
List of extended plays, with selected chart positions and sales
Title	EP details	Peak chart positions	Sales
Title	EP details	KOR	Sales
See Your Eyes	Released: December 16, 2014; Label: Peponi Music; Format: CD, digital download	—	—N/a
Jannabi's Small Pieces I (잔나비 소곡집 l)	Released: November 6, 2020; Label: Kakao M; Format: CD, digital download	13	KOR: 10,851
Jannabi's Small Pieces II: Grippin'TheGreen (잔나비 소곡집 II : 초록을거머쥔우리는)	Released: May 10, 2022; Label: Kakao Entertainment; Format: CD, digital download	15	KOR: 10,339
"—" denotes releases that did not chart or were not released in that region.

== Singles ==
=== As lead artist ===
List of singles as lead artist, with selected chart positions and certifications
Title	Year	Peak chart positions	Certifications (Note: In April 2018, the Korea Music Content Association introduced music recording certifications for albums and singles; pre-2018 releases therefore are ineligible for certifications.)	Album
Title	Year	KOR	Certifications	Album
"Rocket"	2014	—	—N/a	Non-album single
"Pole Dance" (봉춤을 추네)	2014	—	—N/a	Pole Dance
"November Rain"	2014	112	—N/a	See Your Eyes
"See Your Eyes"	2014	—	—N/a	See Your Eyes
"Summer" (뜨거운 여름밤은 가고 남은 건 볼품없지만)	2016	15	—N/a	Monkey Hotel
"She"	2017	37	—N/a	Non-album singles
"Good Boy Twist"	2018	—	—N/a	Non-album singles
"Made in Christmas" (featuring Lee Su-hyun)	2018	—	—N/a	Non-album singles
"Like When We First Met" (처음 만날때처럼) (Yoon Jong-shin cover)	2019	129	—N/a	Non-album singles
"For Lovers Who Hesitate" (주저하는 연인들을 위해)	2019	1	KMCA: 2× Platinum (streaming) (Note: "for lovers who hesitate" was certified platinum for 100 million streaming on November 7, 2019 and for 200 million streaming on January 12, 2023.); KMCA: Platinum (download) (Note: "for lovers who hesitate" was certified platinum for 2.5 million downloads on December 10, 2020.)	Legend
"A Thought on an Autumn Night" (가을밤에 든 생각)	2020	10	—N/a	Jannabi's Small Pieces I
"I Know Where the Rainbow Has Fallen" (외딴섬 로맨틱)	2021	103	—N/a	The Land of Fantasy
"Grippin'TheGreen" (초록을거머쥔우리는)	2022	77	—N/a	Jannabi's Small Pieces II: Grippin'TheGreen
"May the Tenderness Be with You!" (사랑의이름으로) (featuring Karina of Aespa)	2025	82	—N/a	Sound of Music Pt. 1
"Sunshine Comedy Club" (선샤인코메디클럽)	2025	— (Note: "Sunshine Comedy Club" did not enter Circle Digital Chart but peaked at number 36 on Circle Download Chart)	—N/a	Sound of Music Side Story: Summer Vacation Edition
"Just Kids" (첫사랑은 안녕히-)	2025	135	—N/a	Sound of Music Pt. 2: Life
"—" denotes releases that did not chart or were not released in that region.

=== As featured artist ===
List of singles as featured artist, with selected details
Title	Year	Peak chart positions		Album
Title	Year	KOR	KOR Hot	Album
"The Star of The Movie" (그 영화의 주인공) (OVAN featuring Jannabi)	2017	—N/a	—N/a	Non-album single
"On the Path" (길을 걷다 보면) (Lee Moon-sae featuring Jannabi and Kim Yoon-hee)	2018	—N/a	—N/a	Between Us
"—" denotes releases that did not chart or were not released in that region.

=== Soundtrack appearances ===
List of soundtrack appearances, with selected chart positions
Title	Year	Peak chart positions		Album
Title	Year	KOR	KOR Hot	Album
"Paradise" (파라다이스)	2015	—	—	Let's Eat 2 OST
"Colorful" (알록달록)	2015	—	—	Ex-Girlfriends' Club OST
"Cuckoo"	2015	—	—	Second 20s OST
"Wonderful" (얼마나 좋아)	2016	—	—	Dear My Friends OST
"Beautiful" (잔나비)	2016	—	—	Dear My Friends OST
"Can I Laugh?" (웃어도 될까요)	2016	—	—	Drinking Solo OST
"A Story I Couldn't See" (나는 볼 수 없던 이야기)	2019	80	78	Romance Is a Bonus Book OST
"After a Tumultuous Night" (소란한 밤을 지나)	2021	168	—	Love Spoiler OST
"Look at You!"	2022	— (Note: "Look At You!" did not enter the Circle Digital Chart, but it peaked at number 37 on the component BGM Chart and at number 72 on the component Download Chart.)	—	With the Silk of Dohpo Flying OST
"—" denotes releases that did not chart or were not released in that region.

=== Promotional singles ===
List of promotional singles, with selected chart positions and notes
Title	Year	Peak chart positions	Album	Notes
Title	Year	KOR	Album	Notes
"Midnight Music" (한밤의 뮤직) (No Brain cover)	2021	—	Non-album singles	No Brain's 25th Anniversary Project
"Pony"	2023	124	Non-album singles	Hyundai Motor Company's Heritage Project Pt. 1
"Good Luck to You" (행운을 빌어요) (Peppertones cover)	2024	— (Note: "Good Luck to You" did not enter the Circle Digital Chart, but it peaked at number 103 on the component Download Chart and at number 166 on the component BGM Chart.)	Twenty Plenty	Peppertones' 20th Anniversary Album Project
"Dream Is Beautiful" (아름다운 꿈)	2025	— (Note: "Dream Is Beautiful" did not chart on the Circle Digital Chart but peaked at number 29 on the Download Chart.)	Non-album single	Hyundai Motor Company's Heritage Project Pt. 2
"—" denotes releases that did not chart or were not released in that region.

== Other charted songs ==
List of other charted songs, with selected chart positions and certifications
Title	Year	Peak chart positions		Album
Title	Year	KOR	KOR Hot	Album
"Baby I Need You" (사랑하긴 했었나요 스쳐가는 인연이었나요 짧지않은 우리 함께했던 시간들이 자꾸 내 마음을 가둬두네)	2014	15	19	Pole Dance
"Tell Me" (꿈나라 별나라)	2016	— (Note: "Tell me" did not enter the Circle Digital Chart, but it peaked at number 119 on the component BGM Chart and at number 128 on the component Download Chart.)	—	Monkey Hotel
"Together!" (투게더!)	2019	111	—	Legend
"About a Boy" (우리 애는요)	2019	129	—	Legend
"Dreams, Books, Power, and Walls" (꿈과 책과 힘과 벽)	2019	157	—	Legend
"Good Good Night" (나의 기쁨 나의 노래)	2019	179	—	Legend
"Sweet Memories" (그 밤 그 밤)	2020	116	87	Jannabi's Small Pieces I
"Step" (한걸음)	2020	128	40	Jannabi's Small Pieces I
"Blue Spring" (작전명 청-춘!)	2020	185	—	Jannabi's Small Pieces I
"Bluebird, Spread Your Wings!" (블루버드, 스프레드 유어 윙스!)	2021	— (Note: "Bluebird, Spread Your Wings!" did not enter the Circle Digital Chart, but it peaked at number 48 on the component BGM Chart and at number 129 on the component Download Chart.)	—	The Land of Fantasy
"Summer II" (밤의 공원)	2021	— (Note: "Summer II" did not enter the Circle Digital Chart, but it peaked at number 23 on the component Bell Chart, number 24 on the component BGM Chart, number 36 on the component Ring Chart and at number 78 on the component Download Chart.)	—	The Land of Fantasy
"SummerFallWinter Spring." (여름가을겨울 봄.)	2022	191	—	Jannabi's Small Pieces II: Grippin'TheGreen
"As Tears Go By" (슬픔이여안녕)	2022	— (Note: "As Tears Go By" did not enter the Circle Digital Chart, but it peaked at number 119 on the component BGM Chart.)	—	Jannabi's Small Pieces II: Grippin'TheGreen
"Music" (뮤직)	2025	— (Note: "Music" did not enter Circle Digital Chart but peaked at number 65 on Circle Download Chart)	—	Sound of Music Pt. 1
"Flash"	2025	— (Note: "Flash" did not enter Circle Digital Chart but peaked at number 50 on Circle Download Chart)	—	Sound of Music Pt. 1
"I Will Die for You X3" (아윌다이포유 X3)	2025	— (Note: "I Will Die for You X3" did not enter Circle Digital Chart but peaked at number 42 on Circle Download Chart)	—	Sound of Music Pt. 1
"I Watched the Sunset from the Rooftop" (옥상에서 혼자 노을을 봤음)	2025	— (Note: "I Watched the Sunset from the Rooftop" did not enter Circle Digital Chart but peaked at number 44 on Circle Download Chart)	—	Sound of Music Pt. 1
"To the Rainbow, Juno!" (Juno! 무지개 좌표를 알려줘!)	2025	— (Note: "To the Rainbow, Juno!" did not enter Circle Digital Chart but peaked at number 70 on Circle Download Chart)	—	Sound of Music Pt. 1
"All the Boys and Girls, Pt.1: Birdman" (모든 소년 소녀들1 : 버드맨)	2025	— (Note: "All the Boys and Girls, Pt.1: Birdman" did not enter Circle Digital Chart but peaked at number 41 on Circle Download Chart)	—	Sound of Music Pt. 1
"All the Boys and Girls, Pt.2: The Rainbow" (모든 소년 소녀들2 : 무지개)	2025	— (Note: "All the Boys and Girls, Pt.2: The Rainbow" did not enter Circle Digital Chart but peaked at number 57 on Circle Download Chart)	—	Sound of Music Pt. 1
"Summer Sun, I'm Your Fan Club" (사람들은 다 그래 맛있는 걸 먹을 때와 여름의 바닷가에서는)	2025	— (Note: "Summer Sun, I'm Your Fan Club" did not enter Circle Digital Chart but peaked at number 40 on Circle Download Chart)	—	Sound of Music Side Story: Summer Vacation Edition
"—" denotes release did not chart.

== Music videos ==
Title	Year	Director(s)	Notes	Ref.
"Summer" (뜨거운 여름밤은 가고 남은 건 볼품없지만)	2016	Lee Rae-kyung (BEHIND THE SCENES)	Features Jannabi and Yoo Eden	
"She"	2017	Unknown	Performance version	
"Wish" (가사)	2018	Unknown	Unofficial Music Video	
"Good Boy Twist" (굿보이 트위스트)	2018	Minju Kim, Dongseob Lim (96WAVE)	Features Jannabi and Choi Jung-hoon's father	
"Made In Christmas"	2018	Minju Kim, Dongseob Lim (96WAVE)	Features Jannabi	
"Like When We First Met" (처음 만날때처럼)	2019	Jung Hee-taek		
"For Lovers Who Hesitate" (주저하는 연인들을 위해)	2019	Jeon Yonghyeon		
"A Thought On An Autumn Night" (가을밤에 든 생각)	2020	Jeon Yonghyeon		
"I Know Where The Rainbow Has Fallen" (외딴섬 로맨틱)	2021	Iwa		
"The King Of Romance" (로맨스의 왕)	2021	Oh Yumi	Features Choi Jung-hoon for Customellow Music Project	
"Grippin'TheGreen" (초록을거머쥔우리는)	2022	Iwa	Features Ahn So-yo	
"Summerfallwinter Spring." (여름가을겨울 봄.)	2022	SOZE YOON	Features Choi Jung-hoon	
"Drop The Beat" (드랍 더 빛고을)	2022	Unknown	Promotion video for Buskers World Cup in Gwangju	
"Coloring Your Face"	2023	JTBC Brand Department; Executive Producer: Kim Hyejin; Creative Director: Lee Jounghoon	Features Jannabi for JTBC new brand song	
"Pony"	2023	HOBIN	Features Choi Jung-hoon for Hyundai Heritage Music Project	
"May the Tenderness Be with You!" (사랑의이름으로)	2025	HOBIN	Features Jannabi and LEEBORO's animation	
"Dream is Beautiful" (아름다운 꿈)	2025	DQM	Features Jannabi for 2nd collaboration project with Hyundai	
"Sunshine Comedy Club" (선샤인코메디클럽)	2025	Jannabi and Peponi Music	Features Jannabi	
"Summer Sun, I'm Your Fan Club" (사람들은 다 그래 맛있는 걸 먹을 때와 여름의 바닷가에서는)	2025	Jannabi and Peponi Music	Features Jannabi	
"Just Kids" (첫사랑은 안녕히-)	2025	Jeon Yonghyeon	Features Choi Myung-bin and Moon Woo-jin	

== Other appearances ==
Title	Year	Album
"I Will Give You Everything" (나 그대에게 모두 드리리) (Lee Jang-hee cover)	2020	You Hee-yeol's Sketchbook: 26th Voice, Vol. 48
"Rain Falls When You Are Leaving" (그대 떠나는 날 비가 오는가) (Sanulrim cover)	2020	You Hee-yeol's Sketchbook: 26th Voice, Vol. 49
"Don't Worry, Dear" (걱정말아요 그대) (Jeon In-kwon cover with Yoo Hee-yeol, Yoon Jong-shin, Lee Juck, Mamamoo, 10cm and Jung Seung-hwan)	2020	You Hee-yeol's Sketchbook: 50th Voice, Vol. 79
"Confession" (고백 ) (Delispice cover)	2021	SBS Archive K - Korean Indie Music Part 1
"Summer" (뜨거운 여름밤은 가고 남은건 볼품 없지만)	2021	SBS Archive K - Korean Indie Music Part 2
