= All the Boys and Girls =

2025 concert tour by Jannabi

- Concert by Jannabi
- Location: South Korea
- Associated album: Sound of Music Pt. 1
- Start date: April 26, 2025
- End date: June 29, 2025
- Duration: 140 minutes
- No. of shows: 8 shows

Jannabi concert chronology
- Fantastic Old Fashioned 2024: Movie Star Rising (2024); All the Boys and Girls (2025)

The All the Boys and Girls (Korean: 모든소년소녀들) was a concert by South Korean indie rock duo Jannabi. It is their first solo concert approximately seven months since their nationwide tour Fantastic Old Fashioned 2024: Movie Star Rising (2024). The concert began at Jamsil Arena in Seoul from April 26 to 27 and May 3 to 4. The band later travelled and performed at Gwangju Women's University Universiade Gymnasium on June 14 to 15 and Daegu EXCO East Wing Hall 6 on June 28 to 29.

== Background ==
On April 1, 2025, the band's agency, Peponi Music, announced that they would be having a concert for over four weeks. The poster released along with the news of the concert contained Jannabi's refreshing yet boyish image, increasing fans' anticipation.

== Commercial performance ==
The ticket sales were made available via Ticketlink. Ticket prices were ₩128,000, ₩158,000, and ₩178,000. The ticket sales for the first week of Seoul were made available on April 4 at 7 pm (KST), and tickets for the second week were made available at 8 pm (KST), which sold out for all days as soon as they opened. The ticket sales opening for Gwangju happened on May 21 and Daegu on May 29, both at 8 pm (KST), with the latter selling out as soon as they opened.

== Shows ==
List of concerts, showing date, city, country, venue and attendance
| Date | City | Country | Venue | Attendance |
|---|---|---|---|---|
| April 26, 2025 | Seoul | South Korea | Jamsil Arena | 21,860 |
| April 27, 2025 | Seoul | South Korea | Jamsil Arena | 21,860 |
| May 3, 2025 | Seoul | South Korea | Jamsil Arena | 21,860 |
| May 4, 2025 | Seoul | South Korea | Jamsil Arena | 21,860 |
| June 14, 2025 | Gwangju | South Korea | Gwangju Women's University Universiade Gymnasium | — |
| June 15, 2025 | Gwangju | South Korea | Gwangju Women's University Universiade Gymnasium | — |
| June 28, 2025 | Daegu | South Korea | Daegu EXCO East Wing Hall 6 | 6,088 |
| June 29, 2025 | Daegu | South Korea | Daegu EXCO East Wing Hall 6 | 6,088 |
| Total | | | | N/A |

== See also ==
- List of Jannabi live performances
