= Fantastic Old Fashioned 2024: Movie Star Rising =

2024 concert tour by Jannabi

- Concert by Jannabi
- Location: South Korea
- Start date: August 31, 2024
- End date: September 15, 2024
- Duration: 140 minutes
- No. of shows: 6 shows

Jannabi concert chronology
- Fantastic Old-fashioned End of the Year Party! (2022–2023); Fantastic Old Fashioned 2024: Movie Star Rising (2024); All the Boys and Girls (2025)

The Fantastic Old Fashioned 2024: Movie Star Rising (Korean: 판타스틱 올드 패션드 2024: 무비 스타 라이징) is a concert by South Korean indie rock duo Jannabi. It was their first solo concert in about a year and seven months since their nationwide tour Fantastic Old-fashioned End of the Year Party! (2022–2023). The concert began at Jamsil Arena in Seoul on August 31, September 1, 7, and 8. The band then travelled to Busan and performed at BEXCO Auditorium on September 14 and 15.

== Background ==
On May 31, 2024, Jannabi uploaded a video to their social media, outlining their accomplishments and festival performances in May and revealing the schedule for their solo concert. On July 5, the concept and concert title were revealed, and on July 9, the official poster with ticket sale information was announced on their social media. According to reports, Jannabi plans to deliver the stories embedded in its music, along with its trademark witty stage direction and flawless live performances, in line with the subtitle "Movie Star Rising."

== Commercial performance ==
The ticket sales were made available via Ticketlink. Ticket prices were ₩128,000, ₩158,000, and ₩178,000. The first round of ticket sales for the August 31 and September 1 concerts in Seoul began on July 18 at 8 pm (KST), which sold out for both days as soon as they opened. The second round of ticket sales happened on July 24 at 7 pm (KST) for the September 14 and 15 concerts in Busan and at 8 pm (KST) for the September 7 and 8 concerts in Seoul, which reached 150,000 simultaneous users at the reservation site, selling out all seats. Due to high demand, tickets for additional seats that were originally on hold due to checking of visibility after stage installation were made available for purchase. The purchase is limited to two tickets per person through Ticketlink and on-site sales prior to the show.

On September 6, the Seoul Metropolitan Government requested that people use public transportation when visiting the Jamsil Sports Complex due to a lack of parking space, and it is expected that 60,000 people will flock to the band's concert and a professional baseball game on the weekend of September 7 and 8.

== Shows ==
List of concerts, showing date, city, country, venue and attendance
Date	City	Country	Venue	Attendance
August 31, 2024	Seoul	South Korea	Jamsil Arena	over 40,000
September 1, 2024	Seoul	South Korea	Jamsil Arena	over 40,000
September 7, 2024	Seoul	South Korea	Jamsil Arena	over 40,000
September 8, 2024	Seoul	South Korea	Jamsil Arena	over 40,000
September 14, 2024	Busan	South Korea	BEXCO Auditorium	—
September 15, 2024	Busan	South Korea	BEXCO Auditorium	—
Total				N/A

== See also ==
- List of Jannabi live performances
