= Jannabi (band) =

South Korean indie rock band

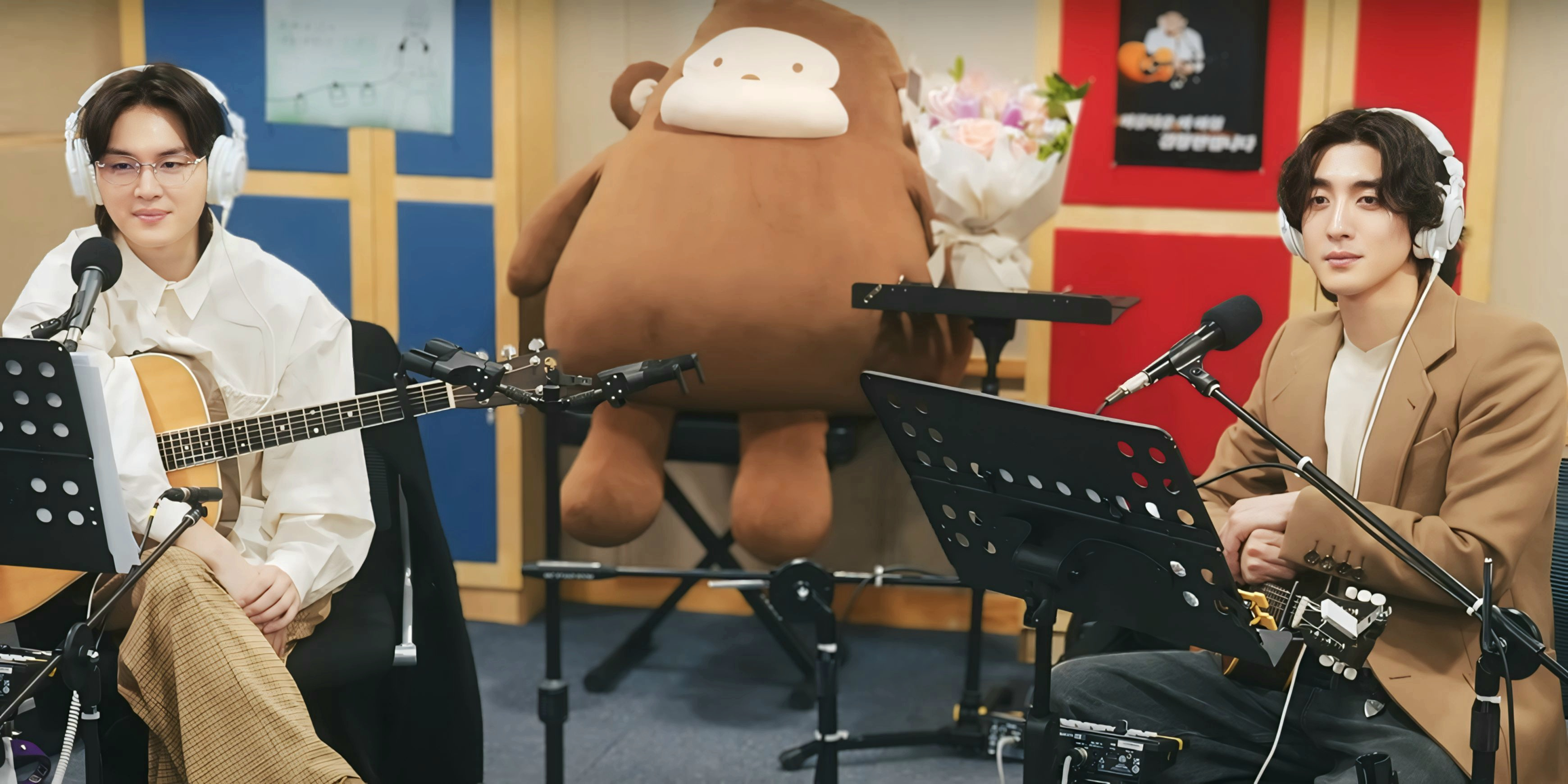
- Jannabi in 2024; Kim Do-hyung (left) and Choi Jung-hoon (right)

Background information
- Also known as: Bundang band; Bundang Community band; Community band
- Origin: Bundang-gu, South Korea
- Genres: Indie rock; modern rock; pop rock; chamber pop; art rock; folk rock
- Works: Discography; live performances
- Years active: 2012–present
- Label: Peponi Music
- Members: Choi Jung-hoon; Kim Do-hyung
- Past members: Yoo Young-hyun; Yoon Kyul; Jang Kyung-joon

Jannabi (Korean: 잔나비; stylized in all caps) is a South Korean indie rock band formed in 2012 under the independent record label Peponi Music. The band currently consists of lead vocalist and guitarist Choi Jung-hoon and guitarist Kim Do-hyung. Originally a quintet, keyboardist Yoo Young-hyun left in 2019, drummer Yoon Kyul in 2021, and bassist Jang Kyung-joon in 2022. Themes commonly explored throughout their work include love, life, childhood, youth, and growth. Praised for their live performances and self-produced songs infused with profound lyricism unique to the Korean language and vintage overtones, they have grown as one of South Korea's most influential rock bands, often known as the country's most loved rock band.

Jannabi's debut studio album, Monkey Hotel (2016), incorporated pop rock and yielded the successful single "Summer." The band rose to prominence and broke new ground in the Korean popular music scene that is almost dominated by idol groups for their critically acclaimed second album, Legend (2019), which exemplified a chamber pop style. Its lead single, "For Lovers Who Hesitate," topped South Korea's Circle Digital Chart, sold 2.5 million digital copies, and was certified triple platinum for streaming by the Korea Music Content Association. The band broadened their repertoire in subsequent albums, including The Land of Fantasy (2021), Sound of Music Pt. 1 (2025), and Sound of Music Pt. 2: Life (2025), drawing from genres like art rock, baroque pop, and progressive rock.

Jannabi has released a total of four studio albums, three extended plays, and one reissue to date; three of which have peaked in the top ten and nine singles on the Circle Chart. Their accolades include a Golden Disc Award, two Korean Music Awards, two MAMA Awards, a Melon Music Award, a Seoul Music Award, and a The Fact Music Award. In 2024, Jannabi became the first South Korean rock band formed after the 2010s to headline the Incheon Pentaport Rock Festival, 10 years after winning the Penta Super Rookie Grand Prize in 2014.

== Name ==
Jannabi, an archaic Korean word for monkey, was formed by neighborhood friends in Bundang born in 1992, the Year of the Monkey in the Chinese zodiac. The team's name was suggested to them by a friend. They introduce themselves as a group sound, which was used to refer to a band in the Korean music scene in the 1960s and 1970s, signifying the group's desire to restore the classics of band music and represent the era.

== History ==
=== Before 2012-2013: Formation and early years ===
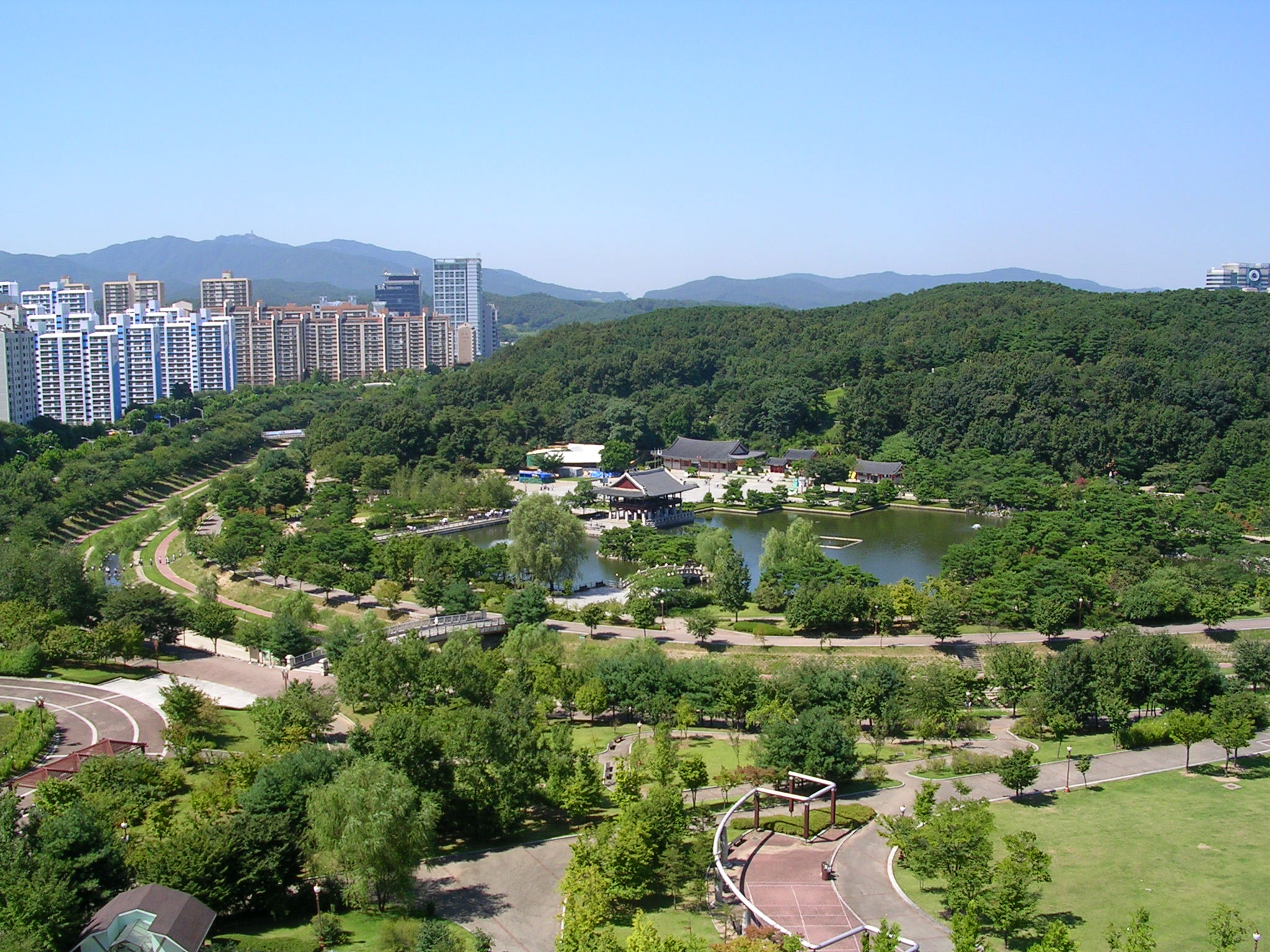
Bundang Central Park, where the Bundang-bred band, Jannabi, regularly performed

Choi Jung-hoon first met Jang Kyung-joon in Bundang Elementary School and played with him in a school band called "After School Activity" in Seohyun Middle School. Kim Do-hyung was in a different band called "Genesis." They were in neighborhood rival bands. Kim first became aware of Choi because of his exceptional singing abilities, while Choi discovered Kim's self-composed music through Mule, an online community for musicians. Choi and Kim officially met at a Korean language academy in Bundang and hit it off, deciding to form a band together in high school. Since 2008, the three of them would regularly perform at Bundang Central Park.

Following high school graduation, Choi and Jang entered in universities while Kim did not, and they were also looking for contracts with entertainment companies to pursue music. In 2011, Kim and Jang debuted as part of the Yanghwajin Band (양화진) at CAN Entertainment and disbanded the following year. Choi was close to signing a contract but faced opposition from his family. He continued to audition alone and eventually became a trainee at FNC Entertainment to debut as part of N.Flying. He decided to leave after realizing creative differences with the agency and group, and he wanted to freely make music with his friends.

In 2012, Kim introduced his friend, Yoo Young-hyun, to Choi to join the group, forming Jannabi. Alongside their formation, Peponi Music, an independent record label led by Choi's brother, Choi Jung-joon, was established.They honed their skills through over 70 club live performances and 100 busking trips on the streets of Hongdae and Insa-dong.

In 2013, Jannabi auditioned for Superstar K5 to raise their profile, with Kim and Yoo being eliminated and Choi joining the new group Plan B (플랜비), advancing to the Top 7. Choi later returned to Jannabi with Superstar K5 mentor Shinsadong Tiger, who helped them to set their direction and managed the group for their first digital single. S. Tiger did not intervene in the song modification, which won Jannabi's gratitude and praise.

=== 2014-2015: Debut and new members ===
In 2014, the release of their debut single album, Rocket, which was originally scheduled for April 18, was postponed due to the Sewol ferry disaster, expressing condolences to the victims. The song was officially released on April 28. Originally titled Love and performed in the GOGOS 2 underground club in 2013, the song blended folk rock and reggae beats, with brass and piano playing in a jazz style, creating a unique feeling. On July 24, Jannabi won the grand prize in Penta Super Rookie 2014, a contest that selects new bands to appear at the 2014 Incheon Pentaport Rock Festival. Their debut performance at the festival was held on August 3. On August 28, Jannabi released their second single album, Pole Dance, which included two tracks, "Pole Dance" and "Baby I Need You." On October 29, Jannabi released their third single album, November Rain, followed by their second mini-solo concert at Club Ta in Hongdae on November 7. On November 8, Jannabi participated as one of the Top 10 finalists for the Hongdae Street Song Festival, an event that discovers amateur musicians in celebration of Joy News 24's 10th anniversary. On December 16, Jannabi released their first extended play, See Your Eyes.

In 2015, Jang and Yoon Kyul joined Jannabi. Jang, a long-time guest member, became a regular member through a love call, while Yoon, a talented drummer majoring in drums in college, joined through an audition. In the same year, Jannabi started participating in composing and releasing original soundtracks for Korean dramas, including Let's Eat 2, Ex-Girlfriends' Club, and Second 20s. Jannabi won the grand prize at Green Plugged Rookie Green Friends 2015, earning a spot at the 2015 Green Plugged Seoul Festival on May 23. On July 4, Jannabi held their fourth mini-solo concert, "Fire," at Rolling Hall in Hongdae. On November 25, Jannabi held their fifth mini-solo concert, "Change," at Hyundai Card Understage in Itaewon.

=== 2016–2018: Monkey Hotel and collaborations ===
In 2016, Jannabi continued to release OSTs for K-dramas, such as "Wonderful" and "Beautiful" for Dear My Friends, and "Can I Laugh?" for Drinking Solo. Their unique approach to soundtrack creation earned them the title of "tvN civil servants." On June 1, EXID lead single "L.I.E. (Jannabi Remix)" was released. Jannabi celebrated their debut studio album Monkey Hotel release with a sixth solo concert on June 18, before its official release on August 4. The album features ten songs, with the title track "Summer." Recording in the studio involved trial and error, leading to delays. Jannabi gained attention by appearing on MBC's DMC Festival on October 11, ranking first on Naver's real-time search. Their seventh solo concert, "Jannabi and the New World," sold out in five seconds and topped the indie section's reservation rate with a market share of 39.8%.

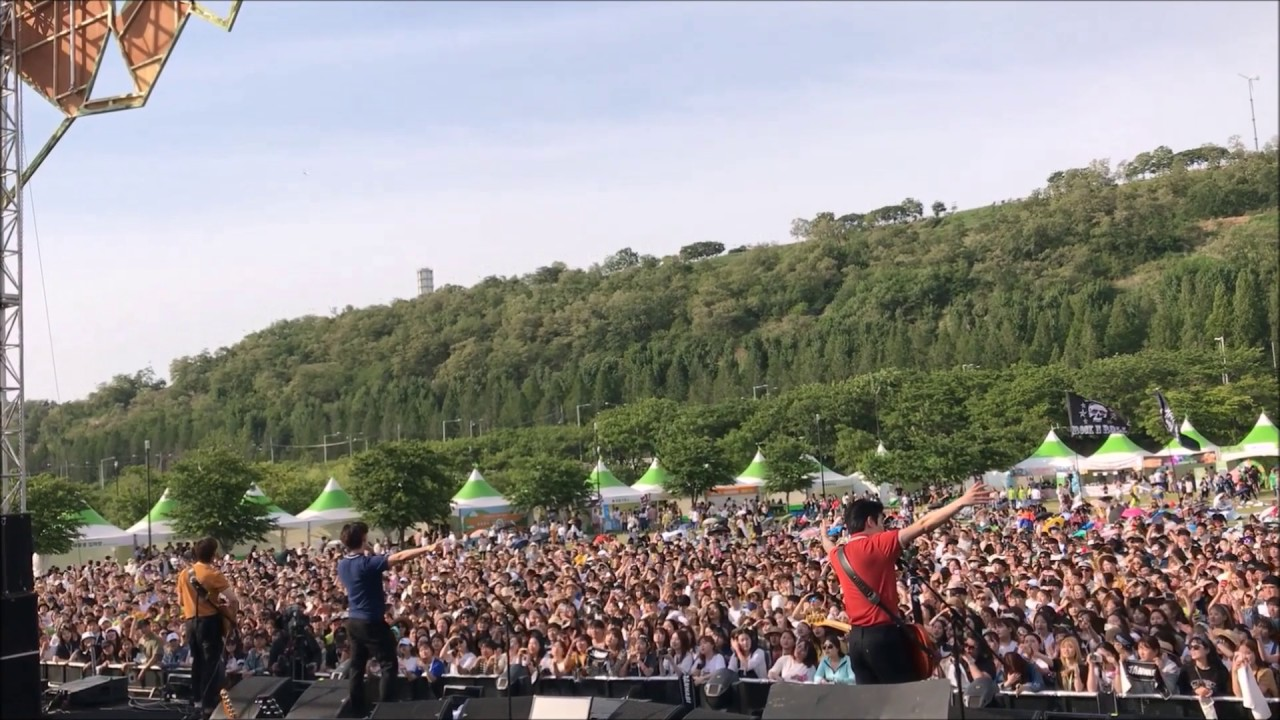
Jannabi at the Greenplugged Seoul Festival on May 20, 2017

In 2017, the collaboration between Yoon Jong-shin and Jannabi was broadcast on VLIVE Hidden Track No. V. Jannabi was chosen for their hard work in the Naver Musician League. They held a mini concert titled "Live to Unlock Yoon Jong-shin X Jannabi" in January, engaging 300 audiences. They made their first appearance on You Hee-yeol's Sketchbook in February, where they received praise from You Hee-yeol. They also appeared on Immortal Songs: Singing the Legend for the first time, covering Yoon Jong-shin's "My Day" song. Jannabi's eighth solo concert, "Stop, look and listen," at Ewha Womans University in June, sold out in two minutes and ranked first in the indie category of Interpark. The concert featured 26 songs in 150 minutes with a concept of an "abandoned opera house" and drew in 1,400 attendees. The band was labeled an "idol band" by the media. Jannabi later released a digital single called "She" on September 9, with Choi expressing hope that it would resonate with fans. Additionally, on December 30 and 31, Jannabi held their ninth solo concert, "Fantastic Old-fashioned End of the Year Party," which also sold out in the indie section with a market share of 38.2%.

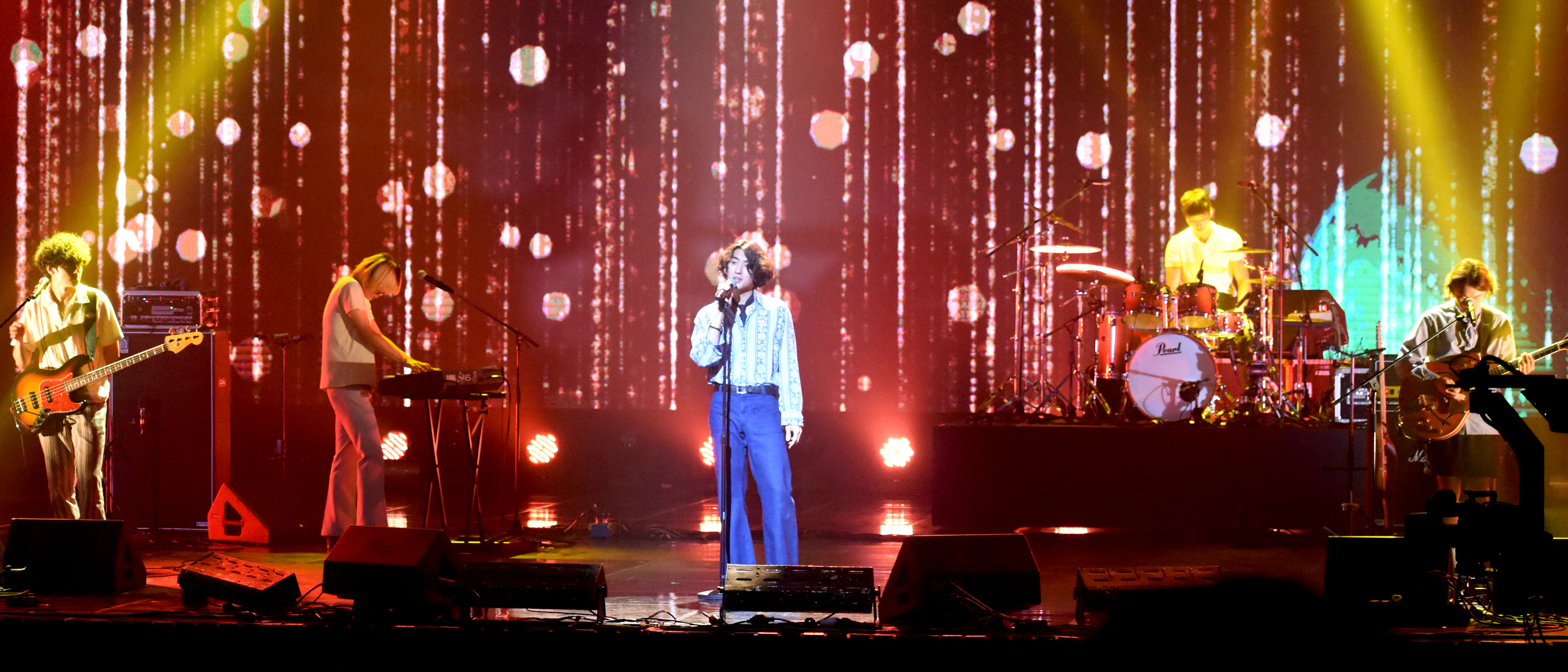
Jannabi at the 2018 Indiestance Final Concert on August 9, 2018

In 2018, Jannabi announced the release of Monkey Hotel Special Edition on April 16, which included unreleased demo songs and a special lyric book. They also released the digital single "Good Boy Twist" on August 13, condensing the band's identity and the hardships that the present generation faces. The song was named one of the "2018 Songs of the Year" by IZM. In the same year, the band collaborated with well-known artists such as Changmo, Lee Moon-sae, and Lee Su-hyun of AKMU. Their collaborations resulted in songs "Lilac," "On the Path," and "Made in Christmas," the lattermost of which entered the Melon Top 100.

=== 2019–2020: Breakthrough with Legend, lineup changes, and Jannabi's Small Pieces I ===
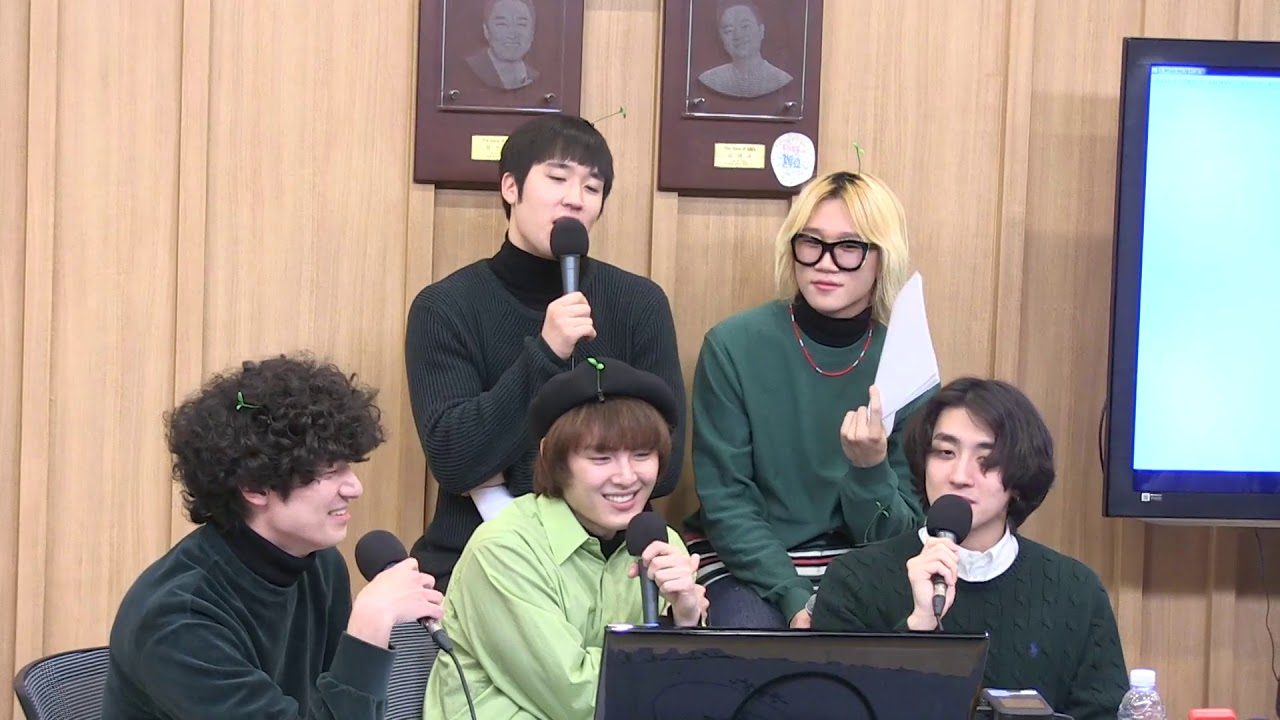
Jannabi in 2019; clockwise from top left: Yoon Kyul, Yoo Young-hyun, Choi Jung-hoon, Kim Do-hyung and Jang Kyung-joon

Beginning of 2019, Jannabi released the "Like When We First Met" single, a remake of Yoon Jong-shin's song, and "Take My Hand" OST for Romance Is a Bonus Book.

On March 13, Jannabi released their second studio album, Legend, which quickly became a sensation. The album's title represents the hardships of youth becoming legendary over time. The lead single, "For Lovers Who Hesitate," gained massive popularity in South Korea, topping music charts dominated by K-pop idols with its retro sound. The song's lyrics, written by Choi, focus on not letting love slip away and staying hopeful for the future. Jannabi embarked on their first concert tour titled "Together," where they performed for a sold-out crowd of 7,600 fans from March to April. They played shows in five different cities across South Korea, starting with two shows in Seoul. Additionally, the album's success caused their previous songs such as "November Rain" (2014), "Baby I Need You" (2014), "Summer" (2016), and "She" (2017) to climb music charts as well.

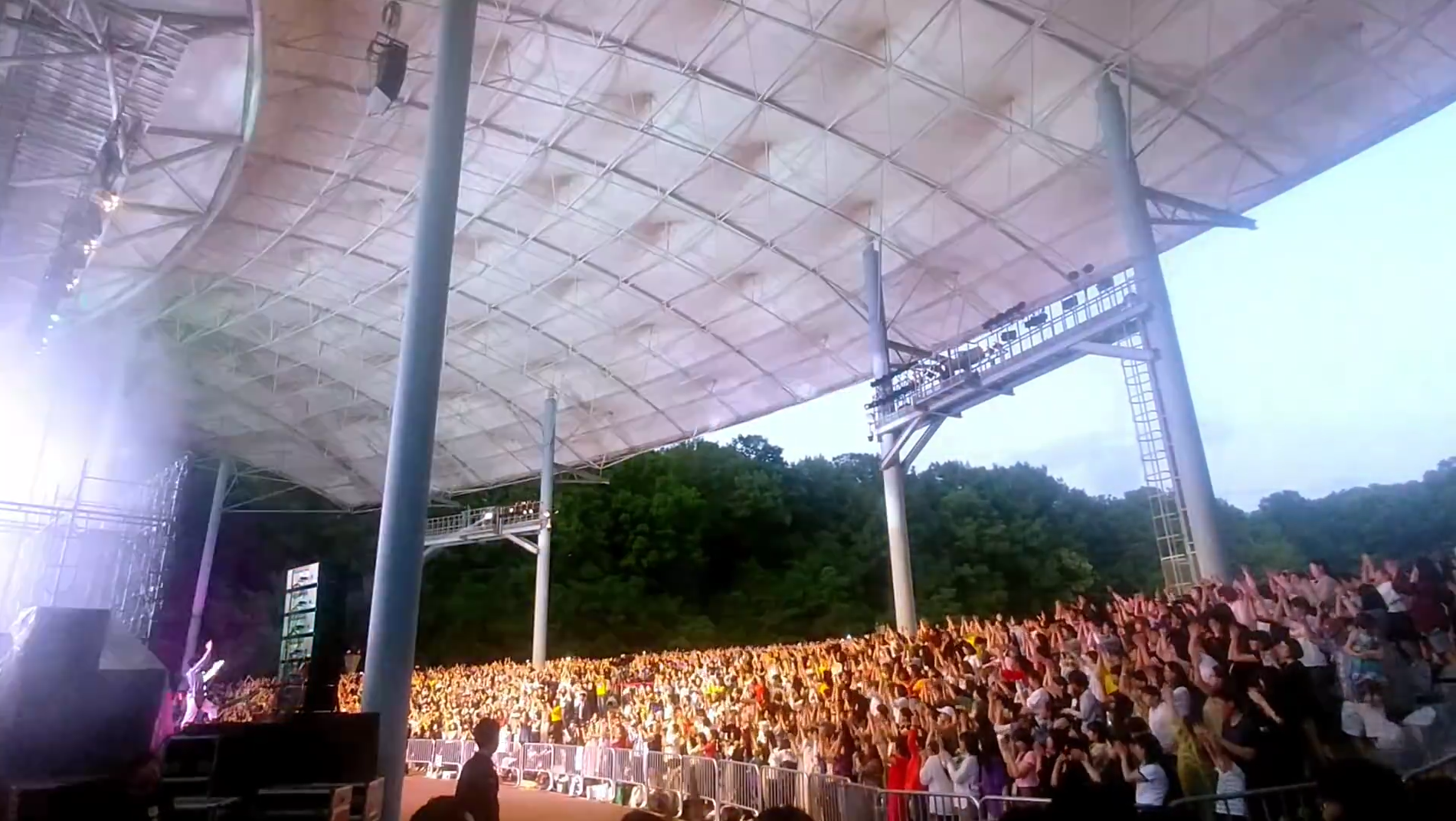
Jannabi at the Seongnam Park Concert in 2019

After rising to fame, Jannabi members faced controversies. Yoo voluntarily left the band in May after admitting to being a bully during his school years. Choi was accused of involvement in his father's company's fraud investigation, denied by Peponi Music. Choi apologized on Instagram for Yoo's controversy and clarified the false reports. A netizen spreading false information was fined ₩5 million for defamation, with Peponi Music pursuing legal action against malicious commenters.

In the same year, Jannabi had successful performances at the Seongnam Park Concert and their two-day concert at the Olympic Hall in Seoul. They won several awards in South Korea, such as Top 10 Artist at the Melon Music Awards and Best Band Performance at the Mnet Asian Music Awards. At the Korean Music Awards, they were nominated for five categories and won Song of the Year and Best Modern Rock Song. KMA wrote,

Jannabi's achievements were attributed to sophisticated music. The vivid melodies of each song, the lyrics that delicately convey the lyricism unique to the Korean language, and the vintage sound that determined the color of the group perfectly matched. The orchestration was also stunning. The expressive power of Choi Jung-hoon, a vocalist who can be said to be unrivaled, is a decisive factor in completing the music. This album revived the public's sensitivity to music, which had been temporarily forgotten by the pursuit of hip and sophistication. This is evidenced by the remarkable increase in retro ballads and long song titles in the music industry after the success of "For Lovers Who Hesitate." Legend changed the landscape of the music industry in 2019.

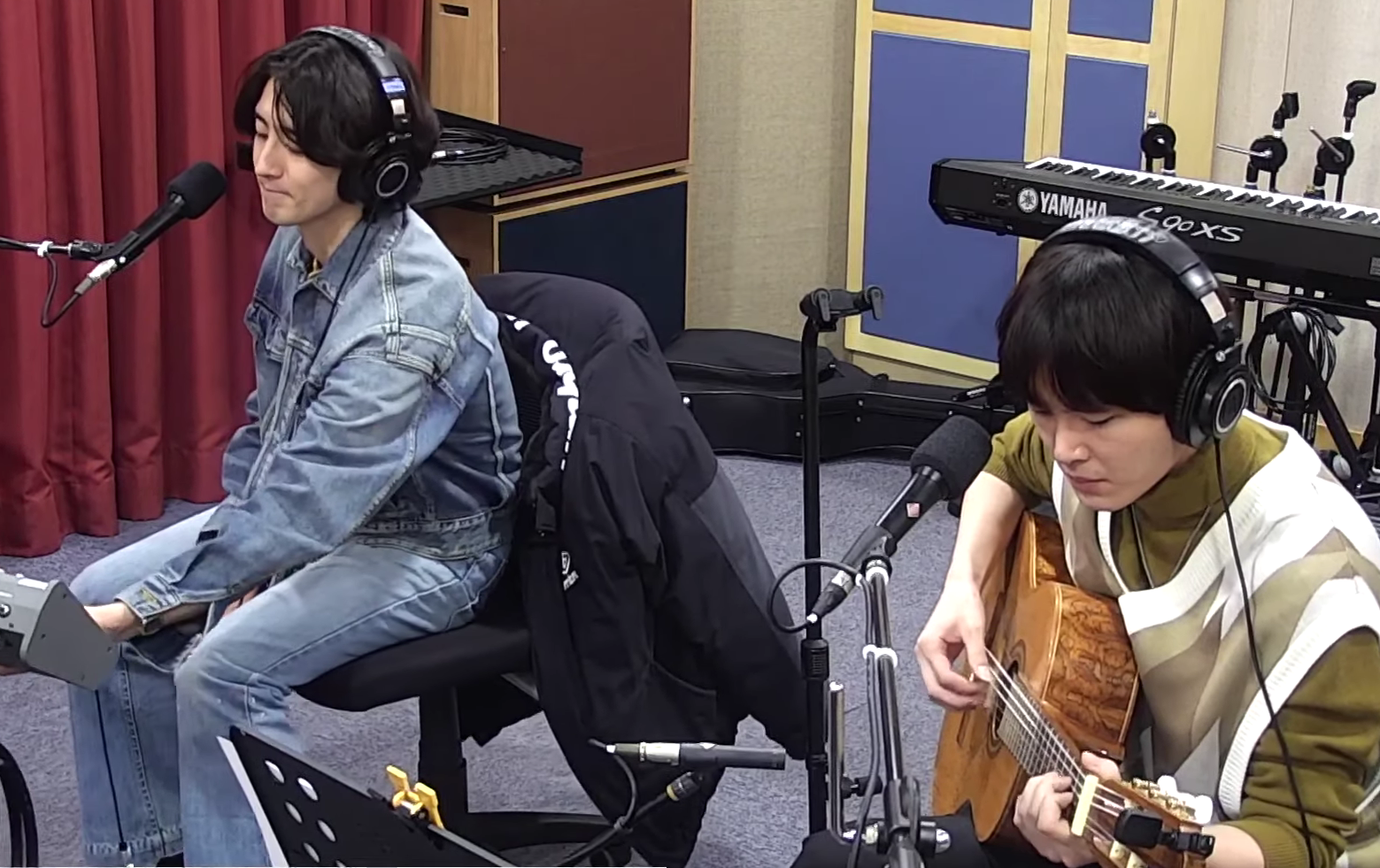
Choi Jung-hoon and Kim Do-hyung at the SBS Power FM in 2020

In February 2020, Jannabi's second concert tour titled "Nonsense II" commenced, performing at sold-out venues, including the Olympic Hall in Seoul and Kim Daejung Convention Center in Gwangju. They had to cancel the Daegu, Busan, and Chuncheon concerts due to COVID-19 pandemic. Later, they donated to COVID-19 screening centers in Daegu.

In June 2020, Peponi Music announced Jang's temporary departure due to backlash over wedding news and military enlistment preparation. Choi and Kim continued as a duo, releasing Jannabi's second EP Jannabi's Small Pieces I in November with hit track "A Thought on an Autumn Night."

=== 2021: The Land of Fantasy ===
In 2021, Kim announced military enlistment on January 21. On March 14, Jannabi released "After a tumultuous night" as Drama Stage's Love Spoiler OST. Jannabi's third studio album, The Land of Fantasy, was released on July 28 with the lead single "I Know Where the Rainbow has Fallen." Choi wrote and composed all thirteen tracks as the album producer, while Kim participated as a composer before his military enlistment. The album topped weekly album charts, entered the Top 10 bestselling albums of Circle Album Chart and received critical acclaim, including being named the Best Album and Best Rock Album of 2021 by Tonplein magazine. Additionally, it was nominated for Best Modern Rock Album at the 2022 Korean Music Awards.

Peponi Music announced the screening of Jannabi's first concert film Jannabi Fantastic Old-Fashioned Returns! X Nonsense II at 50 CGV Cinemas starting September 9. The movie showcases live performances and behind-the-scenes footage from the band's concerts. Their pre-orders topped CGV bookings, and they broke a record with 91 stage greetings. The band then took a two-month hiatus to reorganize after the mentioned activities. On October 29, Jannabi paid tribute to No Brain by participating in the 25th anniversary project of the band and releasing the cover of their song "Midnight Music." On November 24, following reports about Yoon booked for assaulting a woman, Peponi Music responded that he has been promoting together with the band since his return as a guest, but is no longer under contract with the agency before he began his military service. On December 11, Jannabi, represented by Choi, received the Best Band Performance award at the 2021 Mnet Asian Music Awards.

=== 2022–2024: Jannabi's Small Pieces II: Grippin'TheGreen ===
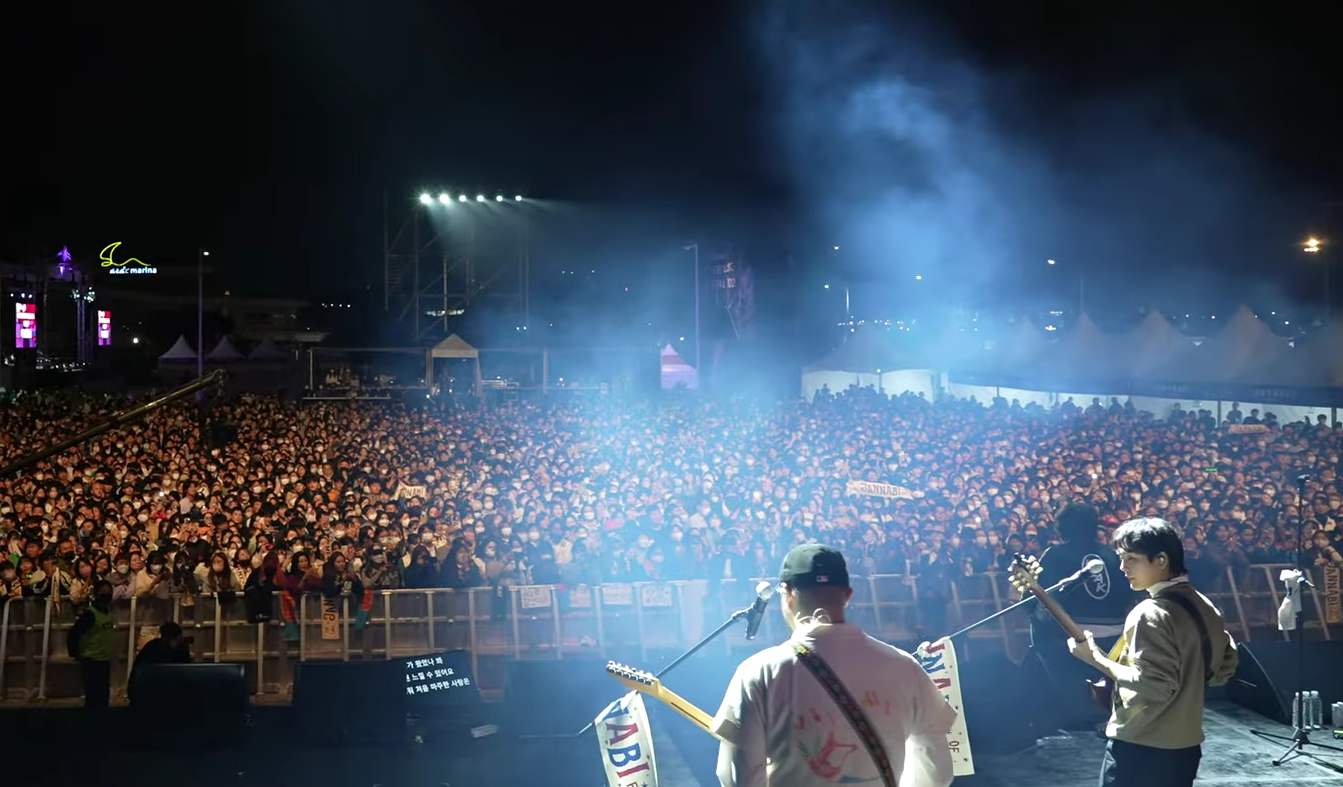
Jannabi at the Gyeonggi Indie Music Festival in 2022

In 2022, Jannabi released their third EP Jannabi's Small Pieces II: Grippin'TheGreen on May 10, featuring songs created at home while looking out the window. The lead single, "Grippin'TheGreen," topped the Bugs! chart and entered the Genie and Melon Top 100. All tracks from the EP also reached the top of the Bugs! chart.

The band performed at various university festivals and music events throughout the year 2022, including headlining slots at music festivals like Beautiful Mint Life, KT&G Sangsang Realization Festival, Seongnam Park Concert, Someday Festival, and Joy Olpark Festival. They released an OST titled "Look At You!" for the variety show "With the Silk of Dohpo Flying." On July 27, following the military discharge of Kim, they participated overseas for the first time at the "K-Indie Music Night" festival in New York. On September 23, Jannabi appeared on Hidden Singer as the highlight artist with their episode ranking first in the time slot, Choi on sixth place in entertainment performers' overall ranking, and the band's representative songs re-entering various domestic charts. On September 26, Choi released a successful collaboration song with Kang Min-kyung titled "Because We Loved." In the same month, a promotional song "Drop the Beat" by Jannabi was released for the Buskers World Cup in Gwangju.

Jannabi's third concert tour, the Fantastic Old-fashioned End of the Year Party!, attracted 50,000 people over three months, from November 2022 to January 2023, leading to sold-out shows. Queues for Ticketlink reached heights of more than 180,000 people as soon as the Seoul shows went on sale. In January, they appeared on JTBC's Begin Again – Intermission. In May, Choi hosted KBS late-night music talk show The Seasons. On June 21, they released the digital single "Pony" in collaboration with Hyundai Motor Company. It is a song inspired by Choi's childhood memories and the Hyundai Pony. Jannabi participated in overseas concerts Immortal Songs Live Concert in US on October 26 and Korea on Stage in London on November 8.

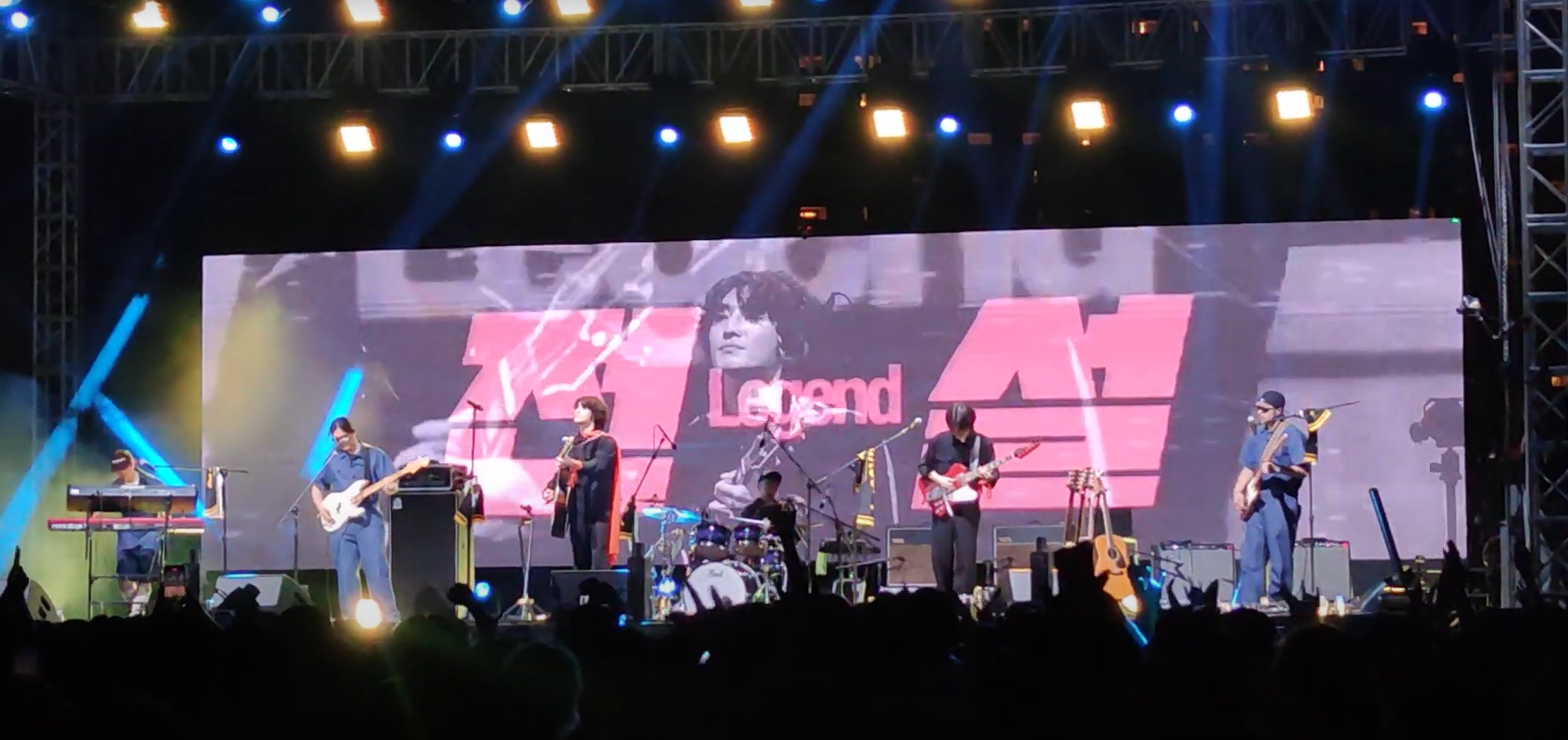
Jannabi at Dongguk University Festival in May 2024

In May 2024, several festival line-ups in South Korea, including over 12 university festivals have included Jannabi. They headlined The Glow 2024, KT&G Sangsang Realization Festival, and Seoul Park Music Festival. On August 4, they achieved the feat of performing on the 2024 Pentaport Headliner stage as the first among bands formed after the 2010s, 10 years after their debut and winning the 2014 Penta Super Rookie. On May 4, they performed in the Philippines for the first time at the 2024 Korea Festival in Manila. On June 1, they made their debut performance at the Seoul Jazz Festival. From August to September, Jannabi held their sold-out 10th anniversary solo concert shows at Jamsil Arena in Seoul and BEXCO Auditorium in Busan, titled Fantastic Old Fashioned 2024: Movie Star Rising with over 150,000 people queuing as soon as the tickets went on sale.

=== 2025–present: Sound of Music ===
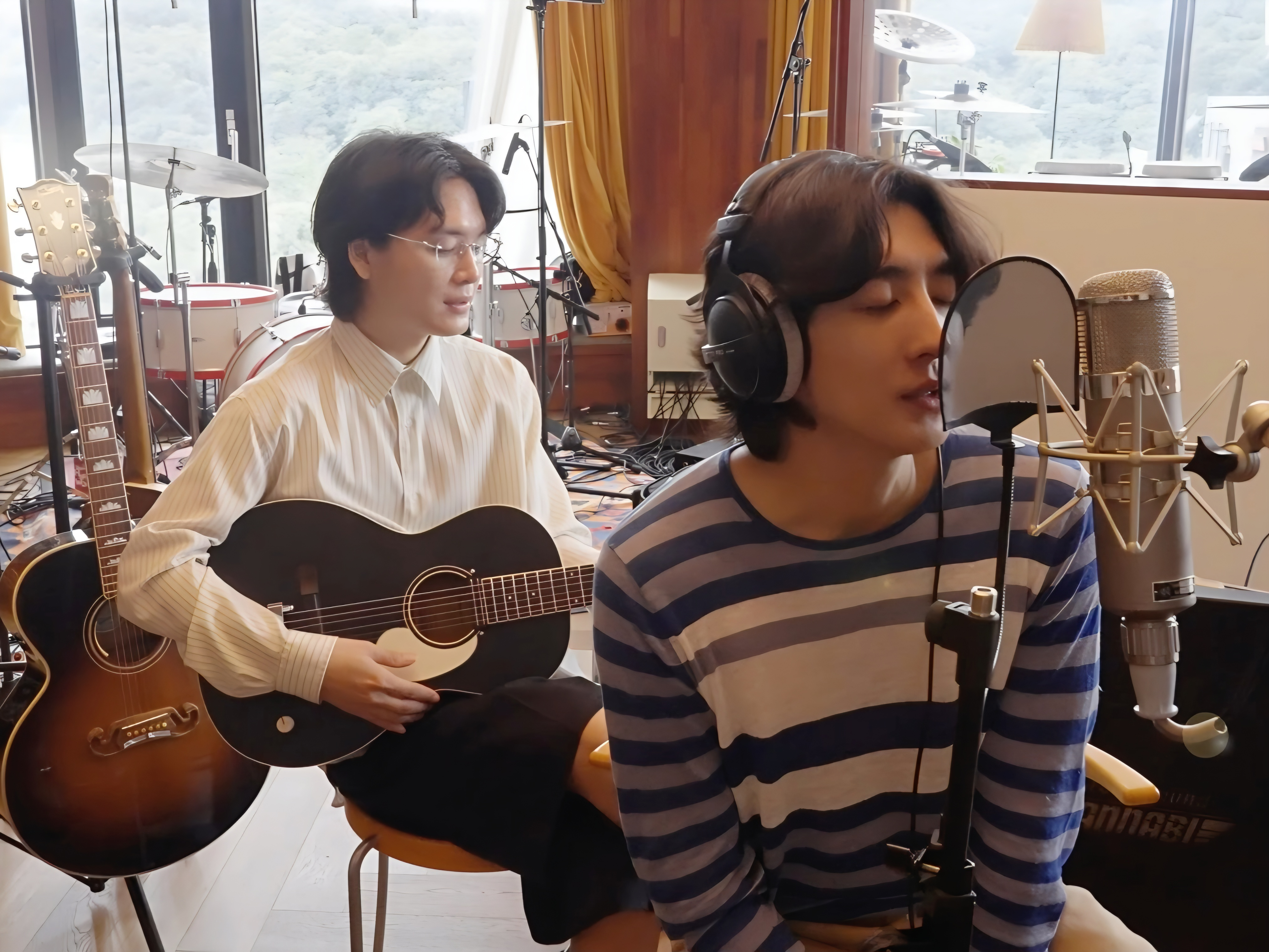
Jannabi at the Monkey Fortress Studios in 2025

Jannabi did the Sound of Music project in 2025 and was able to release twenty tracks. On April 28, they released their fourth full-length album Sound of Music Pt. 1, which coincided with their eleventh debut anniversary. The album featured a total of eight tracks, including the title track "May the Tenderness Be with You!" featuring Karina of Aespa. On May 5, in celebration of Family Month, they released their second project track with Hyundai Motor Company titled "Dream is Beautiful." Choi dedicated the song to his first car Hyundai Ioniq 5 and co member and longtime friend Kim. It was used as the theme song of Catch! Teenieping short spinoff film produced by Hyundai Motor Company and SAMG Entertainment featuring both the show’s characters and Hyundai-branded vehicles. They embarked on a sold-out success fifth concert tour titled All the Boys and Girls 2025 at Jamsil Arena in Seoul on April 26–27 and May 3–4, Gwangju Women's University Universiade Gymnasium in Gwangju on June 14–15, and EXCO East Wing Hall 6 in Daegu on June 28–29. On July 29, they released a digital single, entitled "Summer Vacation Edition," which consisted of two tracks, "Summer sun, i'm your fanclub." and "Sunshine comedy club." It is presented as a "side story" connecting to Sound of Music pt.1 and pt. 2 to be released in fall. The band held an encore concert, “All the Boys and Girls 2125,” on August 2–3 at the KSPO Dome in Seoul for the first time since their debut as a grand finale of their concert tour held from April to June, gathering over 20,000 people. On October 21, they released Sound of Music Pt. 2: Life, which consisted of twelve tracks, including the lead single "Just Kids" and guest features from Yang Hee-eun and Lee Su-hyun. To wrap up the year and welcome the new year, Jannabi held the concert "Chorus Night 2026: The Party Anthem" at the Jamsil Arena in Seoul on December 27-28 and January 3-4, 2026 at the Exhibition Center 1, Hall 1 in Busan to a sold-out crowd.

In May 2026, Jannabi announced their first Asia concert tour, “Sweat & Stardust,” with seven stops that included Taipei, Hong Kong, Tokyo, Singapore, Bangkok, Kuala Lumpur, and Jakarta, which will be held from June 27 to August 23. On May 16, Jannabi participated at the 2026 Moonlight Series, a special annual KBO League rivalry event between the Samsung Lions and the Kia Tigers. Choi and Kim took the ceremonial first pitch and hit as well as held a concert at the Daegu Samsung Lions Park after the match. On May 17, Jannabi became the first headlining artist to perform and fill the Jeonju World Cup Stadium for a new culture in the K League initiated by the Jeonbuk Hyundai Motors called ‘The 3rd Half,’ a concert-style program following the conclusion of matches. The band left a strong impression as guest for the halftime show at the same venue last year. On July 7, Lee So-ra released a comeback single titled, "Summer Breeze," in collaboration with the band as the composer and arranger. From October 23 to 25, Jannabi held a three-day, sold-out solo concert at the KSPO Dome. The event featured two distinct concepts: the Friday performance was titled Jannabi Ballad Collection: 'On a Wonderful Day in October' in Seoul, while the weekend shows launched the Jannabi 2026 Asia Tour: 'Sweat & Stardust.' All tickets sold out within five minutes of going on sale on September 21.

== Artistry ==
=== Influences ===
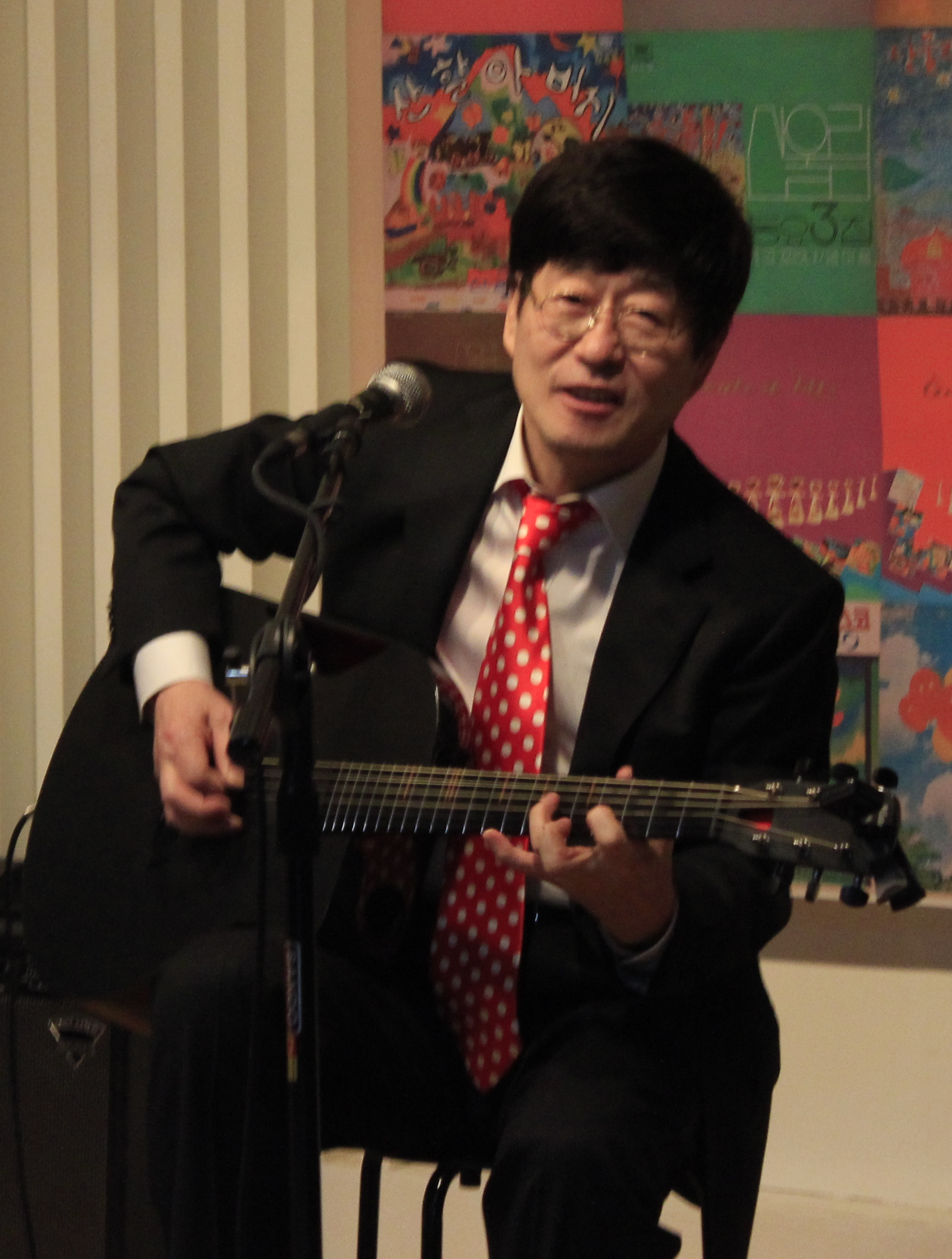
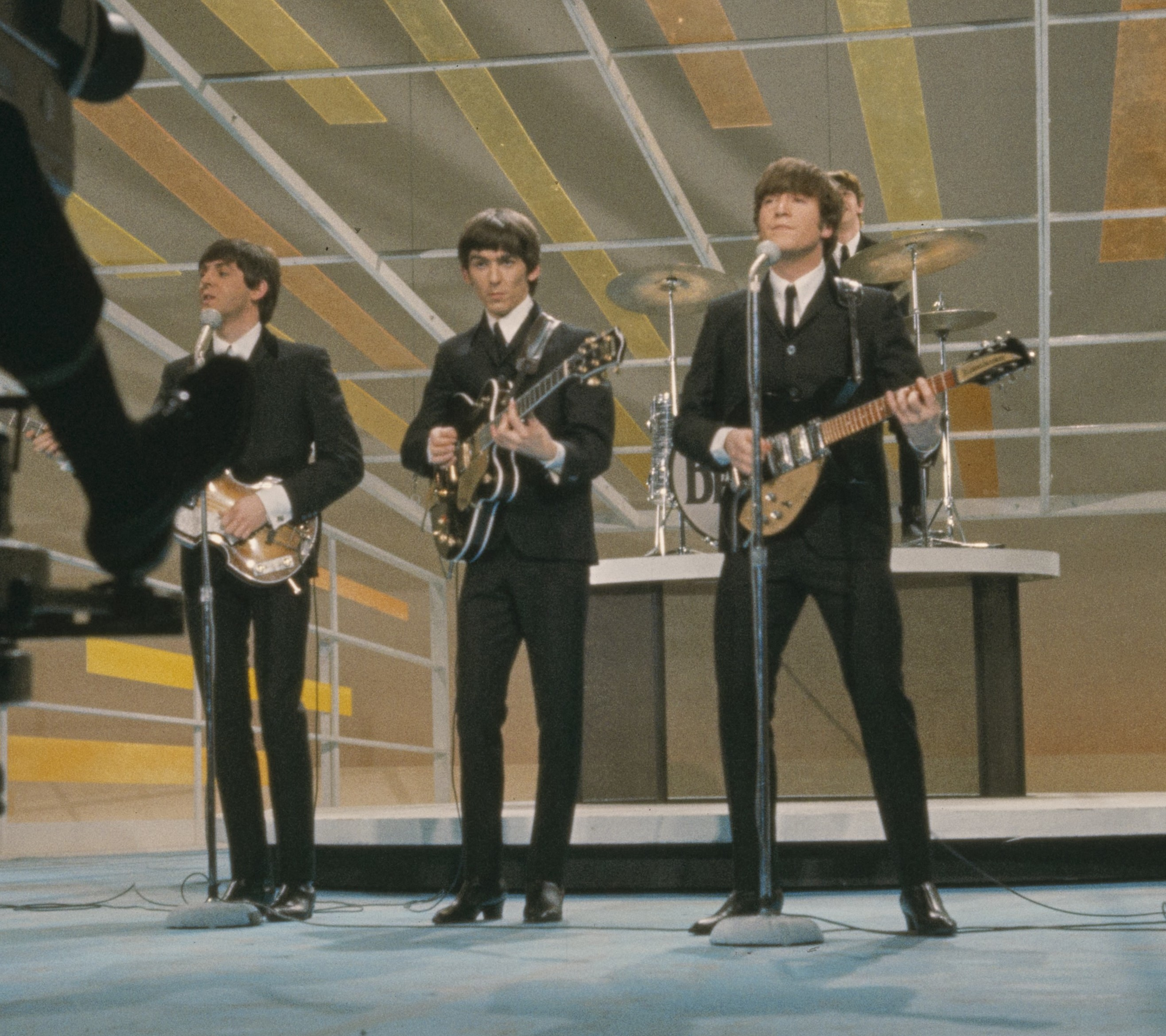
Jannabi's major influences include Sanullim (left) and The Beatles (right).

Jannabi's major influences include Sanullim and The Beatles. They created "A Ballad of Non-Le Jon" to pay homage to The Beatles, reflecting their cynical pursuit of the top and also the band's encouragement to those waiting for their time. Their debut album, Monkey Hotel, was primarily inspired by their old pop and rock of the 1970s influences, including Electric Light Orchestra, Player, and Gilbert O'Sullivan. Their second album, Legend, draws on rock and roll and folk-pop styles that has earned them comparisons to South Korean legends including Kim Kwang-Seok, Sanullim, and Yoo Jae-ha by critics. Their third album, The Land of Fantasy, was heavily influenced by The Moody Blues from the 1960s as revealed by Choi in an interview. The album, with a storyline, showcased their "complete musical freedom" from the success of previous works and explored genres such as baroque pop and rock opera. The band has also cited rock groups such as Simon & Garfunkel, Queen, Blur, Oasis, Black Sabbath, Led Zeppelin, The Beach Boys, Deep Purple, Pink Floyd, and Procol Harum as influences. Individually, aside from the mentioned, Choi named Kim Chang-wan, Elton John, and Damon Albarn as his musical inspirations, while Kim cited Seo Taiji, Ozzy Osbourne, and The Edge of U2. They have also expressed influence from The Black Skirts from modern Korean indie rock.

=== Musical style ===
"Beautiful and lyrical melodies, lyrics that touch upon somewhere deep in our memories, and a retro sound that blends all these elements to evoke nostalgia—Jannabi proved that good music transcends personal taste and possesses universal appeal. The cliché of "bridging generations" is usually closer to a fantasy in real life. After all, people can't even agree on what makes a great restaurant; if the idea of satisfying tastes that vary so widely by gender, age, occupation, and personality isn't a fantasy, then what is? Yet Jannabi capped off a brilliant year by showing that such a fantasy can indeed come true."

— Jung Jin-young, music critic

Jannabi has typically been associated with variety of genres, including indie rock, psychedelic rock, folk, pop rock, chamber pop, and art rock with incisive lyrics and songwriting style suitable for easy listening. They incorporated the nuances of the roots of Korean popular music originally called gayo and classical music elements in innovative ways. In a 2017 interview with The Korea Herald, defining the band's music, the members said: “Sound that comes from your parents’ car.” In a 2022 interview with Yonhap News Agency, Choi shared that their music represents a lot of Korean sentiment, saying: "Our song seems to explain a lot and dig into our emotions too much to listen to, but on the contrary, it allowed us to protect our music." Music journalist Son Hye-min wrote: "Jannabi's charm is the atmosphere of the song that seems to create nostalgia for the past, the lyrics that can be a poem if you spread it out on paper and the emotion that contains more than just saying it is tacky."

Critics praised the universality the band pursues, which appeals to people of all ages. Jo Eun-byul of Sports Seoul said: "The lyrics engraved with each stitch reminded one of a literary work, and the classic melody spanned generations." The Korean Cultural Center New York wrote: "There is something else which makes the band's music powerful: going beyond the compulsion to be dedicated to a single genre. Its free-spirited music was able to set such big milestones because Jannabi has made efforts to put their own stories in their music, their stories of growing up as a band act as a perspective to see the world." Fellow musicians, including prominent figures in the South Korean music industry such as Lee Moon-sae, Kim Chang-wan, Yoon Jong-shin, and Yoo Hee-yeol, have acknowledged their musicality, propelling them to be dubbed "artist's artist" by the media.

=== Songwriting ===
Jannabi writes lyrics, composes, arranges, produces, and performs their own music. At their outset in 2014, while Choi has since been the record producer and lyricist of Jannabi's works, their songs were the product of collaborative songwriting. Choi attributed his early songwriting and classical music interests to his mother. Kim started making music at a young age, with his mother providing support by buying equipment after receiving a CD of his self-composed songs in middle school. In Jannabi's 2024 EBS Space Sympathy special documentary, Choi said of the songwriting partnership: "I think Dohyung and I share the same circuit of mind. Band members are like mirrors and windows that reflect each other's personalities." Kim in a 2025 self-interview prior to the release of their fourth album said: "Junghoon and I encounter something new together every day. We’ve become such a combo that fans even coined the nickname ‘Jakdu’ for us—a language of our own."

The band's lyrical content and composition tended to be classical, introspective, and poetically oriented, which unraveled the "complex emotions of youth" and "awakened empathy" among them. Rather than having an impact on a specific single, many of their albums are conceptual. Other themes of their music include romance, friendship, community, self-awareness, and fictional narratives.

=== Performances ===
Jannabi was noted for their live performances, which frequently involved crowd participation. Their appearances at universities and festivals, furthered by Choi Jung-hoon's showmanship and stage presence, have led the group to be labeled the "god of festivals", "festival king", and "the number one festival attractor", "rock darlings" among others in their home country.

== Members ==
Indie rock duo Jannabi, Choi Jung Hoon (left) and Kim Do-Hyung (right) .

Current members

- Choi Jung-hoon (최정훈) – lead vocals, guitars, keyboards, percussion, synthesizers, songwriter (2012–present)
- Kim Do-hyung (김도형) – guitars, percussion, bass guitar, backing vocals, co-songwriter (2012–present)

Former members

- Yoo Young-hyun (유영현) – keyboards (2012–2019)
- Yoon Kyul (윤결) – drums, percussion (2015–2021)
- Jang Kyung-joon (장경준) – bass guitar, ukulele, backing vocals (2015–2022)

Current session musicians

- Moon Seok-min (문석민) – guitars (2021–present)
- Lee Jun-kyu (이준규) – bass guitar (2022–present)
- Shin Isaac (신이삭) – drums, percussion (2017–present)
- Jeong Ha Eun (정하은) – keyboards (2021–present)
- Kwak Jin-Seok (곽진석)– percussion (2022–present)
- Heo Seong-ju (허성주)/RuRu (루루) – chorus, synthesizers (2022–present)

Former session musicians

- Park Cheon-wook (박천욱) – bass guitar (2020–2022)
- Harmonize (하모나이즈) – choir (2019–2021)
- RuRu, RaRa (루루, 라라) – chorus (2022–2023)

== Other ventures ==
=== Endorsements ===
In May 2019, Jannabi was chosen as the model for Lotte e-commerce's digital video advertisements. The campaign is for customers in their 20s who enjoy sharing information and content. In October 2019, Jannabi was selected as the first Korean artist to be the brand ambassador for sound equipment manufacturer Fender.

From 2022 to 2023, the band's songs from their third studio album, The Land of Fantasy (2021), were featured in the advertisements of various brands. In 2022, "Bluebird, Spread Your wings!" was used for Google Play, released in June, and "Summer II" was used for the iPhone 14 Pro by Apple Inc., released in October. In 2023, "Oh Brave Morning Sun" was used for Korea's leading ginseng brand, Cheong Kwan Jang, released in January, and "I Know Where the Rainbow Has Fallen" was used for Spotify Korea, released in September, where Choi was the endorser. In June 2023, Hyundai Motor Company announced that they selected Jannabi as an ambassador for the global heritage project and released a collaborative song "Pony" and its music video to reinvigorate Hyundai Pony and leverage its legacy. Hyundai collaborated again in 2025 to release the track "Dream is Beautiful" for Family Month, which served as the theme song for the short spinoff film of Catch! Teenieping.

==== List of advertisements ====
Company	Year	Promoting	Theme song(s)	Ref.
Lotte Corporation	2019	LOTTE e-commerce	"She"	
Kolon Industries	2021	Customellow	"King of Romance"	
Sennheiser	2022	Sennheiser Momentum True Wireless 3	"She"	
Google Play	2022	Google Play	"Bluebird, Spread Your Wings!"	
KT Corporation	2022	iPhone 14 Pro	"Summer II"	
Korea Ginseng Corporation	2023	Cheong Kwan Jang	"Oh Brave Morning Sun"	
Spotify Korea	2023	Spotify Korea	"I Know Where the Rainbow Has Fallen"	
Hyundai Motor Company	2023	Hyundai Pony	"Pony"	
JTBC	2023	JTBC	"Coloring Your Face"	
Kooksoondang	2024	Bekseju	"Dreams, Books, Power, and Walls"	
Shinhan Financial Group	2024	Shinhan Financial Group	"Blue spring"	
Google Play	2025	Google Play ChangGoo Program	"Blue spring"	
Hyundai Motor Company	2025	Family Month and Catch! Teenieping short spinoff film	"Dream is Beautiful"	
Woori Financial Group	2025	Woori Financial Group	"I Know Where the Rainbow Has Fallen"	
Woori Financial Group	2026	Woori Financial Group	"Blue spring"	
Tinder	2026	Tinder	"Together!"	
Google Korea	2026	Google Search	"May the Tenderness Be with You!"	

=== Philanthropy ===
In November 2019, Jannabi donated their college festival fee to the development fund of Kyung Hee University, Choi's alma mater.

In March 2020, following the cancellation of their second concert tour, "Nonsense II", due to the COVID-19 pandemic, Jannabi donated masks to the locals of Daegu. The fans were inspired and donated their concert refunds to the same beneficiaries and the locality's screening centers.

In May 2022, Jannabi donated the entire amount of their college festival fee for the students of Kyung Hee University. In September 2022, Jannabi, who appeared at the Chilpo Jazz Festival, donated ₩20 million to Pohang for relief and recovery efforts after the city was hit by Typhoon Hinnamnor.

In July 2023, Jannabi donated ₩10 million to the Hope Bridge Korea Disaster Relief Association to help aid in the recovery of those affected by the damage caused by the torrential rain and flooding across South Korea. In October 2023, Jannabi participated in Greenpeace's Honeybee Restaurant campaign video with actress Youn Yuh-jung by talent donation. Their song "Grippin'TheGreen" was used without a fee or royalty.

In January 2024, Jannabi reportedly performed for free at the festival of Yatap High School, Choi's alma mater, and delivered goods worth ₩30 million to more than 500 students on December 28, 2023, as shared by the school officials in a phone call with The Daily Sports World. The school also shared that they built a small outdoor stage in 2023 to cater to students who want to do busking and named it "Jannabi Square."

In March 2025, Jannabi donated ₩10 million to the Hope Bridge Korea Disaster Relief Association for the wildfire victims in the Ulsan, Gyeongbuk, and Gyeongnam regions. In May 2025, following their All the Boys and Girls concert in Seoul, Jannabi and fans donated the entire proceeds from the misprinted merchandise T-shirt sales, totaling ₩49.6 million, to the ChildFund Korea. The donation will cover educational and living expenses and cultural experiences, helping to support children's healthy development.

As announced by the promotor for their first-ever concert in Indonesia, JANNABI and their management, Peponi Music, extended their support to victims affected by the earthquake in East Nusa Tenggara, Indonesia. As a gesture of care and solidarity, JANNABI and Peponi Music donated a total of ₩6 million to support the relief efforts.

== Discography ==
Studio albums

- Monkey Hotel (2016)
- Legend (2019)
- The Land of Fantasy (2021)
- Sound of Music Pt. 1 (2025)
- Sound of Music Pt. 2: Life (2025)

== Filmography ==
=== Films ===
Year	Title	Hangul	Notes	Ref.
2021	Jannabi Fantastic Old-Fashioned Returns! x Nonsense II	판타스틱 올드패션드 리턴즈! x 넌센스 II	Concert film; CJ CGV release; Gross: US$272,149	

=== Television series ===
Year	Network	Title	Notes
2018	tvN	Let's Eat 2	Cameo, Episode 14
2018	tvN	Drama Stage: Not Played	Cameo, Episode 1
2019	tvN	Romance Is a Bonus Book	Cameo, Episode 5

=== Television shows ===
Year	Network	Title	Notes	Ref.
2013	Mnet	Superstar K 5	Jannabi joined as a contestant. Choi Jung-hoon reached the Top 7 Qualifying Round as part of Plan B.	
2016	Arirang TV	Onstage K	Episode 86	
2018	Arirang TV	I'm Live X Digging	Episode 77	
2017–2019; 2021–2023	KBS2	Immortal Songs: Singing the Legend	Recurring	
2017–2022	KBS2	You Hee-yeol's Sketchbook	Interview and performance	
2019	MBC	I Live Alone	Episodes 289 and 293; Choi Jung-hoon appeared as the highlight artist while Jannabi made cameo.	
2020	MBC	Hangout with Yoo	Interview and performance	
2020–2021	JTBC	Begin Again - Open Mic	Spin-off	
2021	SBS	Legendary Stage Archive K	Interview and performance	
2022	JTBC	Hidden Singer	Choi Jung-hoon appeared as the highlight artist while Kim Do-hyung appeared as a guest; later, Choi appeared as a panelist.	
2023	JTBC	Begin Again - Intermission	Spin-off	
2023	KBS2	The Seasons: Choi Jung-hoon's Night Park	Choi Jung-hoon appeared as the host of its second season. Jannabi appeared in the epilogue of each episode, doing encores.	
2024	EBS1	Masterpiece	This is EBS Space Sympathy's special documentary to mark its 20th anniversary. The second episode's focus is Jannabi’s 2nd Album, Legend.	

== Concerts and tours ==
- Together (2019)
- Nonsense II (2020; cancelled)
- Fantastic Old-fashioned End of the Year Party! (2022-2023)
- Fantastic Old Fashioned 2024: Movie Star Rising (2024)
- All the Boys and Girls (2025)
- Chorus Night 2026: The Party Anthem (2025-2026)
- Jannabi 1st Asia Tour: Sweat & Stardust (2026)

== Accolades ==
=== Awards and nominations ===
Name of the award ceremony, year presented, category, nominee of the award, and the result of the nomination
Award ceremony	Year	Category	Nominee(s) / Work(s)	Result	Ref.
Circle Chart Music Awards	2021	Artist of the Year (Digital Music) – November	"A Thought on an Autumn Night"	Nominated	
Edaily Culture Awards (Note: The Edaily Culture Awards are a South Korean award ceremony established in 2013 to honor the year's best achievements in six categories of performing arts sector: theatre, classical, dance, Korean music, musicals and concerts. Winners are selected by a panel of 54 judges who are professionals in each field.)	2025	Best Concert Award	All the Boys and Girls 2125	Won	
Edaily Culture Awards	2025	Daesang (Grand Prize)	All the Boys and Girls 2125	Nominated	
The Fact Music Awards	2023	Band Performer of the Year	Jannabi	Won	
Golden Disc Awards	2020	Best Digital Song (Bonsang)	"For Lovers Who Hesitate"	Won	
Incheon Pentaport Rock Festival	2014	Penta Super Rookie	Jannabi	Won	
KBS Entertainment Awards	2022	Popularity Award	Immortal Songs: Singing the Legend	Won	
Korea First Brand Awards (Note: Established in 2003, the Korea First Brand Awards is hosted by the Korea Consumer Brand Committee and the Korea Consumer Forum. Awards are based on a nationwide survey held in South Korea.)	2026	Best Band	Jannabi	Nominated	
Korea First Brand Awards	2026	Best Band (Indonesia)	Jannabi	Nominated	
Korean Music Awards	2020	Song of the Year (Daesang)	"For Lovers Who Hesitate"	Won	
Korean Music Awards	2020	Best Modern Rock Song	"For Lovers Who Hesitate"	Won	
Korean Music Awards	2020	Album of the Year	Legend	Nominated	
Korean Music Awards	2020	Best Modern Rock Album	Legend	Nominated	
Korean Music Awards	2020	Artist of the Year	Jannabi	Nominated	
Korean Music Awards	2022	Best Modern Rock Album	The Land of Fantasy	Nominated	
Melon Music Awards	2019	Top 10 Artist	Jannabi	Won	
Melon Music Awards	2019	Artist of the Year	Jannabi	Nominated	
Melon Music Awards	2019	Netizen Popularity Award	Jannabi	Nominated	
Melon Music Awards	2019	Song of the Year	"For Lovers Who Hesitate"	Nominated	
Melon Music Awards	2019	Album of the Year	Legend	Nominated	
Mnet Asian Music Awards	2019	Best Band Performance	"For Lovers Who Hesitate"	Won	
Mnet Asian Music Awards	2019	Song of the Year	"For Lovers Who Hesitate"	Nominated	
Mnet Asian Music Awards	2019	Song of the Year	"Take My Hand"	Nominated	
Mnet Asian Music Awards	2019	Best OST	"Take My Hand"	Nominated	
Mnet Asian Music Awards	2019	Worldwide Fans' Choice Top 10	Jannabi	Nominated	
Mnet Asian Music Awards	2021	Best Band Performance	"A Thought on an Autumn Night"	Won	
Mnet Asian Music Awards	2021	Worldwide Fans' Choice Top 10	Jannabi	Nominated	
Mnet Asian Music Awards	2022	Best Band Performance	"Grippin'TheGreen"	Nominated	
Mnet Asian Music Awards	2022	Song of the Year	"Grippin'TheGreen"	Nominated	
Seoul Music Awards	2020	Main Prize (Bonsang)	Jannabi	Nominated	
Seoul Music Awards	2020	Popularity Award	Jannabi	Nominated	
Seoul Music Awards	2020	K-wave Special Award	Jannabi	Nominated	
Seoul Music Awards	2020	Original Soundtrack Award	"Take My Hand"	Nominated	
Seoul Music Awards	2023	Band Award	Jannabi	Won	
Seoul Music Awards	2023	Ballad Award	"Because We Loved" (with Kang Min-kyung)	Nominated	
V Live Awards	2019	V Live Discover Award	Jannabi	Won	

=== State honors ===
Name of country, year given, and name of honor
Country	Organization	Year	Honor or Award	Ref.
South Korea	Korean Popular Culture and Arts Awards (Note: Honors are given at the Korean Popular Culture and Arts Awards, arranged by the Korea Creative Content Agency and hosted by the Ministry of Culture, Sports and Tourism. They are awarded to those who have contributed to the arts and South Korea's pop culture.)	2024	Minister of Culture, Sports and Tourism Commendation	

=== Listicles ===
Name of publisher, year listed, name of listicle, and placement
Publisher	Year	Description	Placement	Ref.
Ten Asia	2023	Artist of the Year (Hot Genre Brand)	1st	
Gallup Korea	2023	Gallup Korea's Singer of the Year	18th (Note: Jannabi tied with MeloMance (above 2.1%))	
Gallup Korea	2024	Most Loved Band of the 21st Century	7th (Note: They received 12% of the votes from 1,052 men and women aged 19 to 69 across the country.)	
IZM	2025	The 25 Greatest Musicians of the first 25 Years of the 21st Century	Placed	
