= Fantastic Old-fashioned End of the Year Party! =

2022–23 concert tour by Jannabi

- National tour by Jannabi
- Location: South Korea
- Start date: November 5, 2022
- End date: January 29, 2023
- Duration: 180 minutes
- No. of shows: 20 shows
- Attendance: 50,000

Jannabi concert chronology
- Nonsense II (2020); Fantastic Old-fashioned End of the Year Party! (2022–2023); Fantastic Old Fashioned 2024: Movie Star Rising (2024)

The Fantastic Old-fashioned End of the Year Party! (Korean: 판타스틱 올드 패션드 송년회) was the third concert tour headlined by South Korean indie rock duo Jannabi. It was their first solo concert in about three years since the Nonsense II concert held in February 2020. The group had 20 shows in 8 cities in South Korea. The tour recorded over 160,000 waiting numbers during the general sales and was attended by 50,000 people.

== Background and promotion ==
On September 29, 2022, Peponi Music announced that Jannabi would tour concert halls in 8 cities in South Korea: Busan, Gwangju, Seoul, Incheon, Daegu, Suwon, Chuncheon and Cheonan on their social media accounts. In the promotional poster with graphic elements of vintage and colorful sensibility, the duo completed the feel-good energy with finger snap poses. The image was posted featuring the lyrics from their 2019 song "Legend" that reads "Flash, it's my last-ditch effort. Fireworks are the final moments. We have to burn it down." Peponi Music considered performing at the SK Olympic Handball Gymnasium but decided to have the Seoul performances at the Olympic Hall. The stage had a special meaning to the band for that was where they held their breakthrough performance which was rare to happen for an indie band.

In an interview with JTBC's Differential Class All Night Talk, Choi Jung-hoon revealed that the most important part of the setlist was their 2015 song "Beautiful" with a lyrics that says "That's why we are a beautiful moment." The lyrics became the foundation to work on their setlist and convey the message they wanted to tell the audience.

== Critical reception ==
Park So-young of Osen praised the "synergistic effect" of the duo, stating: "It's possible to get tired, but the magic-like performance that everyone doesn't get tired of is the power of Jannabi." Jo Eun-byul of Sports Seoul acknowledged the performance that proved why Jannabi is "the next-generation K-rock band" as they "mesmerized the audience by going back and forth from gentle rock ballads to authentic hard rock with rocking shouts." In addition, she noted: "Choi Jung-hoon trained the audience with more flexible gestures than any other rock group frontman." Pop culture critic Jung Min-jae praised the concert as a "huge rock 'n' roll show" and noted the rarity to see a performance with level of composition and perfection. He added that the band's true value comes from a solo performance, stating: "With overflowing energy and mature expressiveness, they set up a dense stage for 3 hours, smoothly changing the level and mood."

Famous personalities also wrote praises on their personal social media accounts after the performance. Ballet dancer Yoon Hye-jin posted: "Like the lyrics of the song, What can I say! We are lucky to be living in the Jannabi generation.” Singer and lyricist Jo Dong-hee posted: “Excellently beautiful stage art, sound, stage manners, guest care and music.”

== Commercial performance ==
The first ticket opening was in Busan and Seoul and put on sale on Ticketlink on October 4, 2022. The two-day concert in Busan sold out all seats in 3 minutes while the Seoul performances had 160,000 visitors as the reservation started, causing strain on the server at one time. It ranked first and second in the daily reservation rate ranking and weekly best ranking, respectively. Due to high demand, additional limited-view seat tickets for Seoul, Daegu and Chuncheon performances were made available for purchase.

The concert tour recorded a sold out procession and was attended by 50,000 people including Code Kunst, Car, the Garden, Yoon Hye-jin, Uhm Tae-woong, Han Ji-min, Kara's Young-ji, Song Eun-i, Kim Seo-hyung, Seol In-ah, Kim Eana, Lee Dong-hwi and Choi's Hot Singers co-stars Kim Young-ok, Jang Hyun-sung, Lee Jong-hyuk, Yoon Yoo-sun and Seo Yi-sook.

== Set list ==
This set list is representative of the concert in Busan, South Korea on November 5, 2022. It is not intended to represent all dates throughout the tour.

1. "The Secret of Hard Rock"
2. "Good Boy Twist"
3. "A Ballad of Non Le Jon"
4. "Baby I Need You"
5. "Good Good Night"
6. "Together"
7. "She"
8. "Ladybird"
9. "Step"
10. "A Thought on an Autumn Night"
11. "Grippin' the Green"
12. "Hong Kong"
13. "Goodnight"
14. "Summer"
15. "Legend"
16. "Bad Dreams"
17. "Clay Pigeon Boy"
18. "Time"
19. "Summer II"
20. "For Lovers Who Hesitate"
21. "Beautiful"
22. "Tell Me"
23. "Cuckoo"
24. "Variegated"
25. "Jungle"
26. "What's Up (Cover)"
27. "Come Back Home"
28. "As Tears Go By"

Encore

1. "I Know Where the Rainbow Has Fallen"
2. "Bluebird, Spread Your Wings!"
Notes
- There were no special guests during Jannabi's concert tour.
- During the shows in Incheon, Daegu and Suwon, Jannabi performed "Made In Christmas" and "Winter Is Coming." The latter remained added in their set list during their Seoul performances on December 31, 2022, and January 1, 2023.
- During the shows in Chuncheon and Cheonan, Jannabi performed "See Your Eyes" and "Blue Spring."
- During Jannabi's last shows in Seoul on January 28 and January 29, 2023, they performed "Pole Dance" and "Dreams, Books, Power, and Walls."

== Shows ==
List of concerts, showing date, city, country, venue and attendance
Date	City	Country	Venue	Attendance
November 5, 2022	Busan	South Korea	BEXCO Auditorium	4,002 / 4,002
November 6, 2022	Busan	South Korea	BEXCO Auditorium	4,002 / 4,002
November 12, 2022	Gwangju	South Korea	Kimdaejung Convention Center Multi-purpose Auditorium	3,000 / 3,000
November 13, 2022	Gwangju	South Korea	Kimdaejung Convention Center Multi-purpose Auditorium	3,000 / 3,000
November 26, 2022	Seoul	South Korea	Olympic Hall	3,000 / 3,000
November 27, 2022	Seoul	South Korea	Olympic Hall	3,000 / 3,000
December 3, 2022	Incheon	South Korea	Incheon Culture & Arts Center Grand Theater	1,332 / 1,332
December 4, 2022	Incheon	South Korea	Incheon Culture & Arts Center Grand Theater	1,332 / 1,332
December 10, 2022	Daegu	South Korea	Daegu Exhibition & Convention Center (EXCO) 5F Convention Hall	3,500 / 3,500
December 11, 2022	Daegu	South Korea	Daegu Exhibition & Convention Center (EXCO) 5F Convention Hall	3,500 / 3,500
December 17, 2022	Suwon	South Korea	Gyeonggi Arts Center Grand Hall	1,541 / 1,541
December 18, 2022	Suwon	South Korea	Gyeonggi Arts Center Grand Hall	1,541 / 1,541
December 31, 2022	Seoul	South Korea	Olympic Hall	3,000 / 3,000
January 1, 2023	Seoul	South Korea	Olympic Hall	3,000 / 3,000
January 7, 2023	Chuncheon	South Korea	Kangwon National University Baeckryung Art Center	1,600 / 1,600
January 8, 2023	Chuncheon	South Korea	Kangwon National University Baeckryung Art Center	1,600 / 1,600
January 14, 2023	Cheonan	South Korea	Sangmyung University Cheonan Campus Gyedang Hall	N/A
January 15, 2023	Cheonan	South Korea	Sangmyung University Cheonan Campus Gyedang Hall	N/A
January 28, 2023	Seoul	South Korea	Olympic Hall	3,000 / 3,000
January 29, 2023	Seoul	South Korea	Olympic Hall	3,000 / 3,000
Total				50,000

== Tour band ==
- Moon Seok-min (Guitar)
- Lee Jun-kyu (Bass)
- Shin Isaac (Drums)
- Jeong Ha Eun (Keyboards)
- Kwak Jin-Seok (Percussion)
- RuRu, RaRa (Chorus)

== See also ==
- List of Jannabi live performances
