= See Your Eyes =

First EP by South Korean indie rock band Jannabi

EP by Jannabi
- Released: December 16, 2014
- Genre: Indie rock; folk-pop; blues
- Length: 26:10
- Language: Korean
- Label: Peponi Music; Kakao M
- Producer: Choi Jung-hoon

Jannabi chronology
See Your Eyes (2014)	Monkey Hotel (2016)

Singles from See Your Eyes
- 1. "November Rain" Released: October 29, 2014; 2. "See Your Eyes" Released: December 16, 2014

See Your Eyes is the first extended play (EP) by South Korean indie rock band Jannabi. It was released on December 16, 2014, through Peponi Music, distributed by Kakao M, and produced by Choi Jung-hoon. The album features a total of seven tracks, including the lead single "See Your Eyes".

== Background and release ==
On the album's introduction note, the band revealed that the lead single "See Your Eyes" was dedicated to a woman who has been hurt by the wrong way of loving, expressing a man's regret over his irresponsible behavior. In addition, the album included a total of six self-composed songs featuring Jannabi's fresh melody line and neat arrangements, and their third single, "November Rain," which was released in October 2014, was inserted as a bonus track.

Choi Jung-hoon shared, “The most difficult thing about making this album was deciding on the title song. We put a lot of effort into expressing Jannabi’s sensibility and winter feel together." He added, “It will be a warm album that will melt the cold winter.”

== Track listing ==
All tracks are written, composed, and arranged by Choi Jung-hoon, Kim Do-hyung, and Yoo Young-hyun. All tracks are produced by Choi.

See Your Eyes track listing
No.	Title	Length
1.	"Baby Maybe"	3:22
2.	"See Your Eyes"	3:12
3.	"Beautiful" (너 같아)	4:20
4.	"November Rain"	4:18
5.	"Winter Is Coming" (누구나 겨울이 오면; with Lee Gi-lim)	3:35
6.	"The Moon" (달)	3:58
7.	"See Your Eyes" (acoustic version)	3:25
Total length:		26:10
