= Legend (Jannabi album) =

Studio album by Jannabi
- Released: March 13, 2019
- Genres: Indie rock; chamber pop
- Length: 46:47
- Language: Korean
- Labels: Peponi Music; Kakao Entertainment
- Producer: Choi Jung-hoon

Jannabi chronology
Monkey Hotel (2016)	Legend (2019)	Jannabi's Small Pieces I (2020)

Singles from Legend
- 1. "For Lovers Who Hesitate" Released: March 13, 2019

Legend (Korean: 전설; RR: Jeonseol, stylized in all caps) is the second studio album by South Korean indie rock band Jannabi. It was released on March 13, 2019, through Peponi Music, distributed by Kakao Entertainment, and produced by Choi Jung-hoon. The album features a total of twelve tracks, including the lead single "For Lovers Who Hesitate". The album led to Jannabi's creative and commercial breakthrough and considered as one of the most successful albums in the history of Korean indie scene.

== Background and release ==
Reflecting on the meaning of the album's title, Choi stated that it tells the story of a young person's hardships that will itself one day only remain a legend. He wrote: "When I look back when I got older, I hope I can say, 'We also had a legendary youth."

On March 7 and 10, the two video teasers for "For Lovers Who Hesitate" were released through the official YouTube channels of the band and 1theK Originals. On March 13, its full music video was released on the same channels.

The album's lead single, "For Lovers Who Hesitate", gained huge popularity, sweeping music charts in South Korea dominated by K-pop idols with retro music. Choi, as the lyricist of the song, emphasized a love that could have been and a hopeful note to not let love slip away in the future. He shared, "This is the lead track of our second full-length album, written for lovers who hesitate. Not all love lasts forever regardless of how genuine it was. However, that won't stop people from loving and being loved." On the morning of April 19, 2019, it was reported that the song ranked number one in real-time charts including the Billboard K-pop Hot 100 and Gaon Digital Chart, beating out "Boy with Luv" by BTS. The song remained on the charts long after its release, surpassed 100 million streams, and reached 2.5 million downloads on the Gaon Chart, earning platinum certifications from the Korea Music Content Association (KMCA). Many of the tracks included in the album, such as "Dolmaro", "Dreams, Books, Power and Walls", "Good Good Night (Intro)", and "Together!" achieved popular success as well on several domestic music charts. The success of the album also made their old songs such as "November Rain" (2014), "Baby I Need You" (2014), "Summer" (2016), and "She" (2017) climb several domestic music charts in the same year.

== Reception ==
Professional ratings
Review scores
Source	Rating
IZM	3/5 stars

Legend received positive reviews from critics. Lee Kyung-joon of the Korean Music Awards complimented the album, writing, "A common theme is the fear of becoming an adult. The threshold of life that everyone will experience. It's a world like never before. They build consensus with persuasive language based on their own experience. Outstanding melodies, pop sensibilities, and serious messages. It's a masterpiece that deserves to be remembered as an album." Jung Minjae of KMA also gave a positive review, explaining, "The album revived the public's song sensibility, which had been forgotten for a while in the pursuit of 'hip' and sophistication." Kim Do-heon of IZM found Legend as the "radio golden pop in the streaming era." He wrote: "Respect for the classics combined with the desirable attitude of retro maniacs has secured the status of one of the few modern music that parents and children can listen to together." Commercially, the album peaked at number 7 on Gaon Album Chart and sold more than 16,900 copies as of September 2019.

Listicles
Publication	List	Rank	Ref.
EBS	Top 100 Korean Albums (2004–2023)	No order	

== Track listing ==
All lyrics are written by Choi Jung-hoon. All tracks are composed and arranged by Choi Jung-hoon, Kim Do-hyung and Yoo Young-hyun.

Legend track listing
No.	Title	Length
1.	"Good Good Night (Intro)" (나의 기쁨 나의 노래)	3:36
2.	"Together!" (투게더!)	3:06
3.	"Joyful Joyful" (조이풀 조이풀)	4:03
4.	"Mirror" (거울)	3:20
5.	"About a Boy" (우리 애는요)	2:39
6.	"Dolmaro"	3:54
7.	"Legend" (전설)	3:47
8.	"For Lovers Who Hesitate" (주저하는 연인들을 위해)	4:25
9.	"Geum Ui Hwan Hyang" (신나는 잠)	3:42
10.	"Bad Dreams" (나쁜 꿈)	4:52
11.	"Land of Night" (새 어둠 새 눈)	4:26
12.	"Dreams, Books, Power and Walls" (꿈과 책과 힘과 벽)	4:57
Total length:		46:47

== Personnel ==
Credits adapted from the album's liner notes.

- Recording
- Jannabi
- Choi Jung-hoon – vocals
- Kim Do-hyung – guitars
- Yoo Young-hyun – keyboards
- Jang Kyung-jun – bass
- Yoon Kyul – drums

Additional vocalists

- Jeong Sohee – soprano (tracks 1, 5, 7)
- Lee Hye-min, Kim Ye-won, Kwon Se-min, Choi Seo-hyun, Kim Pu-reum, Seo Hye-young, Choi Seo-hee – children's choir (tracks 1, 11, 12)

Additional musicians

- Yoo Seung-chul – trumpet (tracks 3, 6)
- Jung Keun-ho – trumpet (track 5)
- Lee Dong-gi – trumpet (track 8)
- Lukas (Lee In-sung) – saxophone (track 6)
- Lee Jun-Yeon – trombone (track 5)
- Seoul – trombone (track 6)
- Kim Eun-mi – flute (tracks 2, 6, 11)
- Son Seung-yong – French horn (track 3)
- On the String – string (tracks 5, 8)
- Nashville – string (tracks 2, 3, 6, 7, 9, 10, 11)
- David Davidson, David Angell, Conni Ellisor, Mary Kathryn Vanosdale, Carrie Bailey, Jenny Bifano, Wei Tsun Chang – violin
- Monisa Angell, Seanad Chang – viola
- Carole Rabinowitz – cello
- Production
- Main
- Chief Choi(Choi Jung-joon) - executive producer, director of management, director of media planning, A&R direction and coordination
- Choi Jung-hoon – producer
- Kim Dae-sung – mixing, mastering, recording, string recording (tracks 5, 8)
- Yang Ha-jung – recording
- Choi Min-sung – recording
- Gim Si-min – recording, string recording (tracks 5, 8)
- Kim Hwi – recording
- Kim Si-on – recording
- Shin Dong-joo – recording
- Sung Sil Paul Lee – string recording (tracks 2,3,6,7,9,10,11)

Songwriting

- Choi Jung-hoon – lyrics, composition, arrangement, orchestra arrangement
- Kim Do-hyung – composition, arrangement, orchestra arrangement
- Yoo Young-hyun – composition, arrangement, orchestra arrangement
- Jang Kyung-jun – arrangement
- Yoon-kyul – arrangement
- Dr. Kwon – orchestra arrangement

Release

- Qwaya – art direction, graphic design
- Jeon Yong-hyeon – music video director

Recording studio

- Tone Studio, Seoul
- Tone Studio, Jeju
- The Tracking Room Studio, Nashville, TN, USA (tracks 2,3,6,7,9,10,11)

== Charts ==
Chart (2019)	Peak position
South Korean Albums (Gaon)	7

== Accolades ==
Awards and nominations
Award ceremony	Year	Category	Nominee(s) / Work(s)	Result	Ref.
Golden Disc Awards	2020	Best Digital Song (Bonsang)	"For Lovers Who Hesitate"	Won	
Korean Music Awards	2020	Song of the Year (Daesang)	"For Lovers Who Hesitate"	Won	
Korean Music Awards	2020	Best Modern Rock Song	"For Lovers Who Hesitate"	Won	
Korean Music Awards	2020	Album of the Year	Legend	Nominated	
Korean Music Awards	2020	Best Modern Rock Album	Legend	Nominated	
Melon Music Awards	2019				
Melon Music Awards	2019	Song of the Year	"For Lovers Who Hesitate"	Nominated	
Melon Music Awards	2019	Album of the Year	Legend	Nominated	
MAMA Awards	2019	Best Band Performance	"For Lovers Who Hesitate"	Won	
MAMA Awards	2019	Song of the Year	"For Lovers Who Hesitate"	Nominated	

== Certifications ==
Certifications for "For Lovers Who Hesitate"
Region	Certification	Certified units/sales
Download
South Korea (KMCA)	Platinum	2,500,000^{*}
Streaming
South Korea (KMCA)	2× Platinum	200,000,000^{†}
^{*} Sales figures based on certification alone.^{†} Streaming-only figures based on certification alone.

== Release history ==
Release history for Legend
Region	Date	Format(s)	Label(s)	Ref.
Various	March 13, 2019	CD; digital download; streaming	Peponi Music; Kakao Entertainment	
South Korea	July 13, 2019	LP (Limited Edition)	Peponi Music; Kakao Entertainment	
South Korea	April 10, 2020	LP (Limited Edition)	Peponi Music; Kakao Entertainment	
