= Monkey Hotel =

Studio album by Jannabi
- Released: August 4, 2016
- Genres: Indie rock; psychedelic rock; pop rock; folk
- Length: 29:24
- Language: Korean
- Labels: Peponi Music; LOEN Entertainment
- Producer: Choi Jung-hoon

Jannabi chronology
See Your Eyes (2014)	Monkey Hotel (2016)	Legend (2019)

Singles from Monkey Hotel
- 1. "Summer" Released: August 4, 2016

Monkey Hotel (stylized in all caps) is the first studio album by South Korean indie rock band Jannabi. It was released on August 4, 2016, through Peponi Music, distributed by LOEN Entertainment, and produced by Choi Jung-hoon. The album features a total of ten tracks, including the lead single "Summer."

== Background and conception ==
On the album's introduction note, Choi Jung-hoon shared that it is the prelude to a long series that Jannabi is attempting. It connects the songs to one storytelling against the background of a fictional place called Monkey Hotel, revealing the characters and relationship scenarios to each song with illustrations. In an interview with Busan Ilbo, Choi explained the album's concept, stating, “When I went to Hong Kong to play, there were many (people wearing costumes of) monkeys on the street because it was the year of the monkeys. When I went to the hotel, the bellboy was wearing a monkey hat. Conversely, since we are Jannabi, I thought it would be fun to dress up as a bellboy. This is how the Monkey Hotel began.” Later on, the band explained on You Hee-yeol's Sketchbook, aired in 2017, that they were inspired by Wes Anderson's The Grand Budapest Hotel and tried to make an album with a story.

The album attempted various genres such as hard rock, blues and rock and roll that they wanted to play through songs such as "Wish", "Hong Kong", "The Secret of Hard Rock", and "Monkey Hotel", starting with the title track "Summer" (Korean: 뜨거운 여름밤은 가고 남은 건 볼품없지만; RR: Tteugeoun yeoreumbameun gago nameun geon bolpumeopjiman) without losing its psychedelic color. When discussing the title track, Choi wrote the melody for the first time around the middle of 2015. Described as a ballad with an old pop sensibility, it depicts lonesome and empty feeling after a breakup. In a JTBC interview in 2022, he shared that "Summer" is the song he is most thankful for because it promoted the band steadily and gave them a lot of strength to work on their next album confidently.

== Release ==
Their sixth solo concert, titled "Monkey Hotel", was held to commemorate the release of their first full-length album of the same name on June 18, 2016, at KT&G SangSang Madang Live Hall in Seogyo-dong, Seoul. Jannabi revealed that the album was delayed several times as they did a lot of trial and error recording for the first time in a studio. From July 28 to August 3, the two video teasers for "Summer" and the preview of all the tracks in the album were released through the official YouTube channels of the band and 1theK Originals. On August 4, the "Summer" music video was released on the same channels. From August 6 to 7, Jannabi held a "PREVIEW" event featuring an art exhibition and live performance at Space Art 1, a gallery in Jung-gu, Seoul, to celebrate the release of their first album with the fans.

== Reception ==
Professional ratings
Review scores
Source	Rating
IZM	4/5 stars

Im Jin-mo of IZM found Monkey Hotel to be the long-awaited pop or pop rock album. The reason why they dare to use the word pop is because they have harvested the 'popularity' of rock band music that is difficult to come across these days through "proper arrangement and balancing of emotions and energy." With the album's soft theme, "the large stem is taken and the overall unity is given, but the individual songs constantly violate the hearing as if shooting a double-barreled gun." Korean Indie praised the stylistic shift the band did commenting that the album is "curiously old-fashioned-sounding, with a character reminiscent of classical musical theatre and the Roaring Twenties." Music critic Bae Soon-tak called Monkey Hotel "a masterpiece of rock in 2016 that proved that you can have a familiar yet clear personality." He also commended the band with no obsession that "something must be different," but pursued an album "made only of goodwill for familiar things, but like a skillful curator." Commercially, the original version of the album released in 2016 peaked at number 41 while the special edition re-issued in 2018 peaked at number 10 on Gaon Album Chart. The song "Summer" rose to various domestic music charts and peaked at number 15 on the Gaon Digital Chart following Jannabi's rise to fame in 2019.

Listicles
Critic/Publication	List	Rank	Ref.
IZM	2016 Album of the Year		
Naver Music	2016 Album of the Year		
Naver Music	8 albums in 2016 that you won't want to miss		

== Track listing ==
All tracks are written by Jannabi. All tracks are produced by Choi Jung-hoon.

Monkey Hotel track listing
No.	Title	Length
1.	"Goodnight (Intro)"	1:08
2.	"Summer" (뜨거운 여름밤은 가고 남은 건 볼품없지만)	4:03
3.	"Surprise!"	3:22
4.	"Wish"	3:49
5.	"The Secret of Hard Rock"	3:16
6.	"Hong Kong"	3:37
7.	"Tell Me" (꿈나라 별나라)	2:43
8.	"Jungle"	3:09
9.	"Monkey Hotel (Finale)"	2:00
10.	"Waltz (Bonus track)" (왕눈이 왈츠)	2:17
Total length:		29:24

== Chart performance ==
Chart	Peak position
South Korean Albums (Gaon) (Original Version)	41
South Korean Albums (Gaon) (Special Edition)	10

== Release history ==
Release history for Monkey Hotel
Region	Date	Format(s)	Label(s)	Ref.
Various	August 4, 2016	CD; digital download; streaming	Peponi Music; LOEN Entertainment	
South Korea	April 18, 2018	CD (Special Edition)	Peponi Music; LOEN Entertainment	
South Korea	April 10, 2020	LP (Limited Edition)	Peponi Music; LOEN Entertainment	
