= Jannabi's Small Pieces II: Grippin'TheGreen =

Third EP by South Korean indie rock duo Jannabi

Jannabi's Small Pieces ll : Grippin'TheGreen

EP by Jannabi
- Released: May 10, 2022
- Genres: Indie rock; Chamber Pop; pop rock
- Length: 13:49
- Language: Korean
- Labels: Peponi Music; Kakao Entertainment
- Producer: Choi Jung-hoon

Jannabi chronology
The Land of Fantasy (2021)	Jannabi's Small Pieces ll : Grippin'TheGreen (2022)	Sound of Music Pt. 1 (2025)

Singles from Jannabi's Small Pieces ll : Grippin'TheGreen
- 1. "Grippin'TheGreen" Released: May 10, 2022

Jannabi's Small Pieces ll : Grippin'TheGreen (Korean: 잔나비 소곡집 ll : 초록을거머쥔우리는; RR: Jannabi Sogogjib ll : Cholog-eulgeomeojwin-ulineun, stylized as Jannabi's small pieces ll : GRIPPIN'THEGREEN) is the third extended play (EP) by South Korean indie rock duo Jannabi. It was released on May 10, 2022, through Peponi Music, distributed by Kakao Entertainment, and produced by Choi Jung-hoon. The album features a total of four songs, with "Grippin'TheGreen" serving as the album's title track.

Kim Do-hyung has participated in the album on the bass for the third track while on vacation from his military service.

== Background and conception ==
On April 20, 2022, Choi uploaded a short video of moving flowers and an artwork on his personal Instagram account, revealing that something is coming on May 10, 2022. On April 25, Choi announced the band's May comeback EP and possible concerts through a handwritten letter to fans.

Choi revealed that the EP was filled with "songs made at home, in the afternoon, while looking out the window", with Choi hoping that listeners would listen to the EP like that as well. For the song "Ladybird," Choi said, "There are days when you want to capture everything you see. This song is about one of those days," and the title was inspired by the movie Lady Bird." The title song, "Grippin'TheGreen," is a song that creates a leisurely and relaxed atmosphere by capturing the natural feeling of lying still in a park on a spring day. Just like the title, which was born from the phrase "Let's go into summer with green in our hands" in the song "Summer II" from the third album, The Land of Fantasy, it gives a pleasant excitement along with a refreshing spring sensibility. "Summerfallwinter Spring." is the only one of these album titles that uses spaces. Choi, who wrote the song, said that he saved spacing in all titles and used it in spring to emphasize spring as the last season. Periods are also rarely used in song titles to emphasize the end.

== Release ==
The EP name was unveiled alongside the image of the cover on May 1 via the band's official social media accounts. Jannabi shared visual and audio snippets of the tracks from May 2 to 6. On May 10, the EP and its lead single, "Grippin'TheGreen," were released. For the next few days, official lyric visualizers, as well as lives from Monkey Fortress Studios for all tracks, were released by Peponi Music on the band's YouTube channel. On June 1, a music video for "Summerfallwinter Spring.," starring Choi in a cameo role, was released. Choi, along with session musicians, appeared on South Korean music and radio programs as well as college and music festivals for the first time since promotions for The Land of Fantasy and the peak of the COVID-19 pandemic.

== Reception ==
Professional ratings
Review scores
Source	Rating
IZM	3/5 stars

So Seung-gun of IZM wrote that the EP is a "light watercolor painting and a landscape photograph taken with a Polaroid camera that collects the things we have inadvertently passed." With members on hiatus, he emphasized the existence of Choi, who is the driving force behind Jannabi to not stop and guides them to the opposite, unlike other contemporary bands who only want to move forward. He remarked that Jannabi expressed the helplessness caused by the pandemic through music but avoided a cliché approach by expressing it with hopeful lyrics.

Commercially, the title track ranked first on the Bugs! and quickly entered the Top 100 of the Genie and Melon real-time music charts. In addition, all the songs on the EP, including "Ladybird," "Summerfallwinter Spring.," and "Astearsgoby," settled at the top of the Bugs! chart. Aside from the title track that peaked at number 77 on the Circle Digital Chart, "Summerfallwinter Spring." also peaked at number 191 on the same chart.

== Track listing ==
All lyrics are written by Choi Jung-hoon. All tracks are composed, arranged, and produced by Choi.

Jannabi's Small Pieces ll : Grippin'TheGreen track listing
No.	Title	Length
1.	"Ladybird" (레이디버드)	3:27
2.	"Grippin'TheGreen" (초록을거머쥔우리는)	3:24
3.	"Summerfallwinter Spring." (여름가을겨울 봄.)	3:02
4.	"Astearsgoby" (슬픔이여안녕)	3:56
Total length:		13:49

Notes

- "Ladybird," "Grippin'TheGreen," and "Astearsgoby" are stylized in all caps.
- "Summerfallwinter Spring." is stylized as "summerfallwinter sprinG."

== Chart performance ==
Chart (2022)	Peak position
South Korean Albums (Circle)	15

== Accolades ==
Awards and nominations for Jannabi's Small Pieces ll : Grippin'TheGreen
Award ceremony	Year	Category	Nominee(s) / Work(s)	Result	Ref.
MAMA Awards	2022	Best Band Performance	Grippin'TheGreen	Nominated	
MAMA Awards	2022	Song of the Year	Grippin'TheGreen	Nominated	

== Release history ==
Release history for Jannabi's Small Pieces ll : Grippin'TheGreen
Region	Date	Format(s)	Label(s)	Ref.
Various	May 10, 2022	CD; digital download; streaming	Peponi Music; Kakao Entertainment	
South Korea	September 9, 2023	LP (Limited Edition)	Peponi Music; Kakao Entertainment	
