= Jannabi's Small Pieces I =

EP by Jannabi
- Released: November 6, 2020
- Genres: Indie rock; folk-pop; blues
- Length: 15:45
- Language: Korean
- Labels: Peponi Music; Kakao M
- Producer: Choi Jung-hoon

Jannabi chronology
| Legend (2019) | Jannabi's Small Pieces I (2020) | The Land of Fantasy (2021) |

Singles from Jannabi's Small Pieces I
- 1. "A Thought On An Autumn Night" Released: November 6, 2020

Jannabi's Small Pieces I (Korean: 잔나비 소곡집 l) is the second extended play (EP) by South Korean indie rock duo Jannabi. It was released on November 6, 2020, through Peponi Music, distributed by Kakao M, and produced by Choi Jung-hoon. The album features a total of five tracks, including the lead single "A Thought on an Autumn Night."

== Background and release ==
On October 7, 2020, Choi announced through his personal Instagram account that the third studio album of Jannabi will be delayed, but instead they will release a mini-album. The teasers for the lead single "A Thought on an Autumn Night" were released on October 29 and November 4, which previewed the music video. From November 1 to November 5, the album artwork and description for each song were released on the band's social media accounts. The music video for the lead single was released on November 6, the same day as the album. The title track, as the title suggests, contains content that allows you to recall the thoughts you had on an autumn night, especially the nostalgic memories.

== Reception ==
Professional ratings
Review scores
| Source | Rating |
|---|---|
| IZM | 3/5 stars |

Cho Ji-hyun of IZM wrote that the EP is "faithful to the grammar of the past, such as the crisp retro sound of the guitar and the simple chord progression, and expresses the raw sensibility" and praised the "lyrics and emotions of longing and recollection that embroider the entire album." Esther Lim of The Oracle commended the duo's composition and songwriting that "show a deep understanding of the concept of nostalgia." She added that the EP's instrumentation amounts to a "light, hopeful, yet mildly somber tone that perfectly captures the experience of longing for a simpler time."

Commercially, the title track ranked first on various music charts in South Korea, such as Bugs!, Genie, and Vibe upon its release and peaked at number 10 on the Gaon Digital Chart. In addition, other tracks from the EP, including "Sweet Memories," "Step," and "Blue Spring," charted on the Gaon Digital Chart. Jannabi's Small Pieces I peaked at number 13 on the Gaon Album Chart and sold more than 10,800 as of November 2020.

== Track listing ==
All lyrics are written by Choi Jung-hoon, except where noted.

Jannabi's Small Pieces I track listing
| No. | Title | Lyrics | Music | Arrangement | Length |
|---|---|---|---|---|---|
| 1. | "A Thought on an Autumun Night" (가을밤에 든 생각) | | Choi Jung-hoon; Kim Do-hyung | Choi Jung-hoon; Kim Do-hyung | 3:07 |
| 2. | "Step" (한걸음) | Choi Jung-hoon; Kim Do-hyung | Choi; Kim | Choi; Kim | 3:22 |
| 3. | "Sweet Memories" (그 밤 그 밤) | | Choi; Kim | Choi; Kim | 2:55 |
| 4. | "Old Dog" (늙은 개) | | Choi; Kim | Choi; Kim | 2:23 |
| 5. | "Blue Spring" (작전명 청-춘!) | | Choi; Kim | Choi; Kim | 3:58 |
| Total length: | | | | | 15:45 |

== Chart performance ==
| Chart (2020) | Peak position |
|---|---|
| South Korean Albums (Gaon) | 13 |

== Accolades ==
Awards and nominations for Jannabi's Small Pieces I
| Award ceremony | Year | Category | Nominee(s) / Work(s) | Result | Ref. |
|---|---|---|---|---|---|
| Circle Chart Music Awards | 2021 | Artist of the Year (Digital Music) – November | "A Thought on an Autumn Night" | Nominated | |
| MAMA Awards | 2021 | Best Band Performance | "A Thought on an Autumn Night" | Won | |

== Release history ==
Release history for Jannabi's Small Pieces I
| Region | Date | Format(s) | Label(s) | Ref. |
|---|---|---|---|---|
| Various | November 6, 2020 | CD; digital download; streaming | Peponi Music; Kakao M | |
| South Korea | December 10, 2020 | LP (Limited Edition) | Peponi Music; Kakao M | |
| South Korea | September 9, 2023 | LP (Limited Edition) | Peponi Music; Kakao M | |
