= Sound of Music Pt. 2: Life =

Studio album by Jannabi
- Released: October 21, 2025
- Genres: Indie rock, Chamber Pop
- Language: Korean
- Label: Peponi Music
- Producer: Choi Jung-hoon

Jannabi chronology
Sound of Music Pt. 1 (2025)	Sound of Music Pt. 2: Life (2025)

Singles from Sound of Music Pt. 2: Life
- 1. "Just Kids" Released: October 21, 2025

Sound of Music Pt. 2: Life (Korean: 사운드 오브 뮤직 pt.2: LIFE; RR: Saundeu Obeu Myujik Pateu Life; stylized as Sound of Music pt.2: LIFE) is the fourth studio album by South Korean indie rock duo Jannabi. It was released on October 21, 2025, through Peponi Music. The album consists of twelve tracks, including the lead single "Just Kids" and guest features from Yang Hee-eun and Lee Su-hyun.

== Background and conception ==
On October 7, 2025, Jannabi announced the release of the second part of their fourth studio album, Sound of Music, scheduled for October 21, through a teaser video on their official social media channels. The subtitle "life" is a chapter that reconstructs Jannabi’s philosophy of life, which has been seen in songs like "Dreams, Books, Power and Walls", "As Tears Go By," and "I Know Where The Rainbow Has Fallen" with the sensibility of the present. The first part of the series Sound of Music Pt. 1 which came out in April, captured the romance of spring and the vitality of youth. The second part layers the depth of an orchestra with the texture of folk and classical music to deepen the introspective emotions of autumn. It continues Jannabi's exploration of life through music, offering a fresh, more mature perspective while delving into deeper stories about adulthood and life in general, according to Peponi Music, the band's agency.

The album jacket captures two members leaping against a hill backdrop. The red lettering title in a diagonal frame with a film texture adds retro aesthetics. The band also shared a partial tracklist and lyric previews for its fourth studio album through its official social media channels, starting on October 11.

== Track listing ==
All lyrics are written by Choi Jung-hoon. All tracks are composed and arranged by Choi and Kim Do-hyung. All tracks are produced by Choi.

Sound of Music Pt. 2: Life track listing
No.	Title	Length
1.	"Earth" (어스)	1:59
2.	"After School Activity" (애프터스쿨 액티비티)	2:23
3.	"Just Kids" (첫사랑은 안녕히-)	4:06
4.	"Oh New York City" (오 뉴욕시티)	1:32
5.	"Jack Kerouac" (잭 케루악; featuring Yang Hee-eun)	3:22
6.	"Mother" (마더; featuring Lee Su-hyun)	3:37
7.	"Mountain Man" (산사람)	2:53
8.	"Summer Lore I" (여름에 관한 무용담 I)	5:33
9.	"Sweat & Stardust: The Summer-Night Strongman TV Ad (Skit)" (여름밤 차력쇼를 위한 TV광고 : 스웨트 앤 스타더스트 (skit))	0:30
10.	"Universe" (미아의 추억과 유니버스)	3:48
11.	"All the Boys and Girls, Pt.3: Glory" (모든 소년 소녀들3 : 글로리)	2:57
12.	"Sound of Music" (사운드 오브 뮤직)	3:49
Total length:		36:29

Notes

- "Oh New York City" is stylized as "oh New York City"

== Charts ==
=== Weekly charts ===
Weekly chart performance for Sound of Music Pt. 2: Life
Chart (2025)	Peak position
South Korean Albums (Circle)	28

=== Monthly charts ===
Monthly chart performance for Sound of Music Pt. 2: Life
Chart (2025)	Position
South Korean Albums (Circle)	83

== Release history ==
Release history for Sound of Music Pt. 2: Life
Region	Date	Format(s)	Label(s)	Ref.
Various	October 21, 2025	Digital download; streaming	Peponi	
Various	November 12, 2025	CD	Peponi	
Various		LP	Peponi	
