= The Land of Fantasy =

Studio album by Jannabi
- Released: July 28, 2021
- Genres: Indie rock; art rock; rock opera
- Length: 39:53
- Language: Korean
- Labels: Peponi Music; Kakao Entertainment
- Producer: Choi Jung-hoon

Jannabi chronology
Jannabi's Small Pieces I (2020)	The Land of Fantasy (2021)	Jannabi's Small Pieces II: Grippin'TheGreen (2022)

Singles from The Land of Fantasy
- 1. "I Know Where The Rainbow Has Fallen" Released: July 28, 2021

The Land of Fantasy (Korean: 환상의 나라; RR: Hwansangui nara) is the third studio album by South Korean indie rock duo Jannabi. It was released on July 28, 2021, through Peponi Music, distributed by Kakao Entertainment, and produced by Choi Jung-hoon. The album features a total of thirteen tracks, including the lead single "I Know Where The Rainbow Has Fallen."

== Background and release ==
On July 22, Peponi Music announced that Jannabi will be releasing its third studio album, "The Land of Fantasy: Captain Giorbo and the Old-Fashioned Heroes" (The Land of Fantasy), on July 28. The band has been giving hints about the album's atmosphere by revealing a part of the lyrics from each of the songs along with illustrations through the group's official social media accounts. Peponi Music explained that the title track "I Know Where the Rainbow Has Fallen" is “a ballad song that will cool off the hot summer weather.”

On July 23, the band released a stop motion animation teaser for their album through the official YouTube channels of the band and 1theK Originals. In the video, there is a man who contemplates for a long time at his desk before deciding to go pick the stars from the sky, only to be shot down by an arrow. This storytelling was enhanced by the orchestral background music, raising viewers' concentration levels. The video further raised prospective listeners' curiosity about what other stories are left to be told and what music Jannabi has prepared to bring to the stage. From July 25 to July 27, the behind-the-scenes footage and the title track's music video snippet were released on the same channels. On July 28, the title track's full music video was released on the same channels.

== Reception ==
Professional ratings
Review scores
Source	Rating
IZM	4/5 stars

Their repertoire expanded to include a broad variety of music styles with their third full-length album. Described as an album that revealed the "virtues that rock music of the past has sought after," it resembled a musical drama while embedding progressive rock's ambition to become more colorful and grander. The album, with a storyline, showcased their "complete musical freedom" from the success of previous works and explored genres such as baroque pop and rock opera. Korean Indie commented that upon first listen, the album "feels slightly off-kilter," but upon further listens, "it appears as much more and emphasizes both the potential and genuine quality the band has lyrically and compositionally." Kim Sung-yup of IZM said that The Land of Fantasy has an unfamiliar grammar that is not easily found in music these days while not missing the message that allows people to communicate with the artist and the feast of public-friendly sounds, drawing the public to the stage of the show led by the band. South Korean online magazine Tonplein named The Land of Fantasy "The Best Album of 2021" and "The Best Rock Album of 2021." The album was also nominated for "Best Modern Rock Album" in 2022 by the Korean Music Awards. Commercially, the album peaked at number 6 on the Gaon Album Chart and sold more than 13,700 copies as of January 2022.

Listicles
Critic/Publication	List	Rank	Ref.
Tonplein	The Best Album of 2021		
Tonplein	The Best Rock Album of 2021		
Zenerate	Best Korean Album of 2021		

== Track listing ==
All lyrics are written by Choi Jung-hoon. All tracks are composed and arranged by Choi Jung-hoon, Kim Do-hyung and Kwon Ji-soo.

The Land of Fantasy track listing
No.	Title	Length
1.	"The Land of Fantasy" (환상의 나라)	1:08
2.	"Oh Brave Morning Sun" (용맹한 발걸음이여)	3:16
3.	"A Ballad of Non Le Jon" (비틀 파워!)	3:06
4.	"Confession Show" (고백극장)	3:09
5.	"The King of Romance" (로맨스의 왕)	3:44
6.	"Farewell to Arms! + Hymn for the Cradle" (페어웰 투 암스! + 요람 송가)	4:40
7.	"Clay Pigeon Boy" (소년 클레이 피전)	1:46
8.	"Time" (누구를 위한 노래였던가)	3:43
9.	"Summer II" (밤의 공원)	4:47
10.	"I Know Where the Rainbow Has Fallen" (외딴섬 로맨틱)	3:43
11.	"Bluebird, Spread Your Wings!" (블루버드, 스프레드 유어 윙스!)	2:13
12.	"Goodbye Dreamin' Old Stars" (굿바이 환상의 나라)	1:16
13.	"Come Back Home" (컴백홈)	3:22
Total length:		39:53

== Chart performance ==
Chart (2021)	Peak position
South Korean Albums (Gaon)	6

== Accolades ==
Awards and nominations for The Land of Fantasy
Award ceremony	Year	Category	Result	Ref.
Korean Music Awards	2022	Best Modern Rock Album	Nominated	

== Release history ==
Release history for The Land of Fantasy
Region	Date	Format(s)	Label(s)	Ref.
Various	July 28, 2021	digital download; streaming	Peponi Music; Kakao Entertainment	
Various	August 19, 2021	CD	Peponi Music; Kakao Entertainment	
Various	November 20, 2021	LP (Limited Edition)	Peponi Music; Kakao Entertainment	
