= Sound of Music Pt. 1 =

Studio album by Jannabi
- Released: April 28, 2025
- Genres: Indie rock, Chamber Pop
- Length: 25:20
- Language: Korean
- Label: Peponi
- Producer: Choi Jung-hoon

Jannabi chronology
Jannabi's Small Pieces II: Grippin'TheGreen (2022)	Sound of Music Pt. 1 (2025)	Sound of Music Pt. 2: Life (2025)

Singles from Sound of Music Pt. 1
- 1. "May the Tenderness Be with You!" Released: April 28, 2025

Sound of Music Pt. 1 (Korean: 사운드 오브 뮤직 pt.1; RR: Saundeu Obeu Myujik Pateu Won) is the fourth studio album by South Korean indie rock duo Jannabi. It was released on April 28, 2025, through Peponi Music. The album features a total of eight songs, with "May the Tenderness Be with You!" featuring Karina of Aespa, as the lead single for the album.

== Background ==
On April 7, 2025, a teaser video shared via Jannabi's official social media channels shows the duo dressed in crisp white shirts. The two are seen shaking hands formally and signing a document. A desk calendar marked with a yellow-circled date and a bold lightning bolt logo hints at the significance of the album launch on April 28. The album is the band's first new release in almost a year and ten months since their June 2023 single, "Pony", and it celebrates the eleventh debut anniversary of Jannabi. Ahead of the release, Jannabi also shared a self-interview series covering the production process and new profile photos, giving fans a glimpse into the album's direction. The members reflected on what music means to them today — not just as artists, but as people rediscovering joy through their craft. While the new record leans into nostalgia as its core theme, Jannabi aimed for sound collage. On April 21, it was revealed on the band's social media channels that Karina of Aespa would be featured on the title track of their album.

== Release and promotion ==
Jannabi held a solo concert titled All the Boys and Girls 2025 at Jamsil Arena in Seoul on April 26–27 and May 3–4. "All the Boys and Girls" is part of the tracks for their fourth album. For the first week in Seoul, there was a pre-release live for their album, and for the second week, there was a special live after the release. The band then travelled and performed at Gwangju Women's University's Universiade Gymnasium in Gwangju on June 14 and 15 and EXCO East Wing Hall 6 in Daegu on June 28 and 29.

== Critical reception ==
IZE's Kim Seong-dae praised Sound of Music for moving past their older eras into a playful sound collage, combining their core musical inspirations—including The Beatles, Jo Hyu-il, The Beach Boys, and Seo Taiji—alongside some parts reminiscent of Daft Punk with tracks like "All Boys and Girls, Pt.2 : The Rainbow" where the vocals sounds distinctly like Jo hyu-il. He also highlighted the album's cohesive themes around youth and childhood while incorporating genres such as indie rock and chamber pop, noting that "Before long, 'Music of scale' has become an aspect of Jannabi's music."

== Track listing ==
All lyrics are written by Choi Jung-hoon. All tracks are composed and arranged by Choi and Kim Do-hyung, except where noted. All tracks are produced by Choi.

Sound of Music Pt. 1 track listing
No.	Title	Music	Arrangement	Length
1.	"Music" (뮤직)			1:45
2.	"Flash"			3:13
3.	"I Will Die for You♥X3" (아윌다이포유♥x3)			3:18
4.	"May the Tenderness Be with You!" (사랑의이름으로!; featuring Karina of Aespa)			3:25
5.	"I Watched the Sunset from the Rooftop" (옥상에서 혼자 노을을 봤음)			3:22
6.	"To the Rainbow, Juno!" (Juno! 무지개 좌표를 알려줘!)	Choi; Kim; Haeun; Lee Jun-kyu; Shindrum; Kwak Jin-seok	Choi; Kim; Haeun; Lee Jun-kyu; Shindrum; Kwak Jin-seok	1:36
7.	"All the Boys and Girls, Pt.1: Birdman" (모든 소년 소녀들1 : 버드맨)			3:45
8.	"All the Boys and Girls, Pt.2: The Rainbow" (모든 소년 소녀들2 : 무지개)		Choi; Kim; Haeun; Lee Jun-kyu; Shindrum; Kwak Jin-seok; Heo Seong-ju	4:56
Total length:				25:20

== Charts ==
Chart performance for Sound of Music Pt. 1
Chart (2025)	Peak position
South Korean Albums (Circle)	22

== Release history ==
Release history for Sound of Music Pt. 1
Region	Date	Format(s)	Label(s)	Ref.
Various	April 28, 2025	Digital download; streaming	Peponi	
Various	May 12, 2025	CD	Peponi	
Various		LP	Peponi	
