= List of awards and nominations received by V =

V awards and nominations
- V in 2025
Awards and nominations
Award	Wins	Nominations
APAN Star Awards	1	2
Asia Artist Awards	0	3
Circle Chart Music Awards	0	1
DDU Korean Drama Awards	1	1
The Fact Music Awards	3	3
Hanteo Music Awards	3	7
iHeartRadio Music Awards	1	1
iMBC Awards	1	1
Jupiter Music Awards	2	2
Korea First Brand Awards	1	1
Korea Grand Music Awards	2	2
MAMA Awards	1	10
Melon Music Awards	0	2
Music Awards Japan	0	1
Seoul International Drama Awards	0	1
Soompi Awards	2	2
SEC Awards	2	2
Seoul Music Awards	2	4
Top Ten Awards	2	2
UK Music Video Awards	0	1
Universal Superstar Awards	1	1

Totals (Note: Certain award groups do not simply award one winner. They acknowledge several different recipients, have runners-up, and have third place. Since this is a specific recognition and is different from losing an award, runner-up mentions are considered wins in this award tally. For simplification and to avoid errors, each award in this list has been presumed to have had a prior nomination.)
- Wins: 25
- Nominations: 50

The South Korean singer V has received numerous industry awards and honorary accolades. His initial success came with the boy group BTS, which has won seven Korean Music Awards and has been nominated for four Grammy Awards. V made his solo debut in 2024 with his EP Layover, which helped him winning one iHeartRadio Music Award, two Seoul Music Awards and three Hanteo Music Awards, alongside nominations from MAMA Awards and Melon Music Award. His soundtracks also received several acclaims, notably Best OST at the APAN Star Award for "Sweet Night" from the series Itaewon Class (2020), and multiple nominations for "Christmas Tree" from Our Beloved Summer (2022).

== Awards and nominations ==
Name of the award ceremony, year presented, nominee(s) of the award, award category, and the result of the nomination
Award ceremony	Year	Category	Nominee(s)/work(s)	Result	Ref.
APAN Star Awards	2020	Best OST	"Sweet Night"	Won	
APAN Star Awards	2022	Best OST	"Christmas Tree"	Nominated	
Asia Artist Awards	2023	Popularity Award – Actor	V	Nominated	
Asia Artist Awards	2023	Popularity Award – Male Singer	V	Nominated	
Asia Artist Awards	2026	Popularity Award – Solo (Male)	V	Pending	
Circle Chart Music Awards	2024	Artist of the Year – Album	Layover	Nominated	
DDU Korean Drama Awards	2022	Best OST	"Christmas Tree"	Won	
The Fact Music Awards	2023	Best Music – Fall	"Slow Dancing"	Won	
The Fact Music Awards	2024	Best Music – Spring	"Fri(end)s"	Won	
The Fact Music Awards	2025	Best Music – Winter	"Winter Ahead"	Won	
Hanteo Music Awards	2024	Artist of the Year	V	Won	
Hanteo Music Awards	2024	Global Artist Award – Africa	V	Won	
Hanteo Music Awards	2024	Global Artist Award – Europe	V	Won	
Hanteo Music Awards	2024	Global Artist Award – Asia	V	Nominated	
Hanteo Music Awards	2024	Global Artist Award – North America	V	Nominated	
Hanteo Music Awards	2024	Global Artist Award – Oceania	V	Nominated	
Hanteo Music Awards	2024	Global Artist Award – South America	V	Nominated	
iHeartRadio Music Awards	2024	Favorite Debut Album	Layover	Won	
iMBC Awards	2025	Best Solo	V	Won	
Jupiter Music Awards	2025	Male Artist of the Year	V	Won	
Jupiter Music Awards	2026	Male Artist of the Year	V	Won	
Korea First Brand Awards (Note: "The Korea First Brand Awards" is the annual brand awards ceremony in Korea hosted by the Korea Consumer Brand Committee and organized by the Korea Consumer Forum to select top individuals and brands expected to lead the upcoming year based on the results of its consumer surveys and expert evaluations.)	2024	Male Idol Variety Star	V	Won	
Korea Grand Music Awards	2024	Trend of the Year K-pop Solo	V	Won	
Korea Grand Music Awards	2025	Trend of the Year K-pop Solo	V	Won	
MAMA Awards	2022	Best OST	"Christmas Tree"	Nominated	
MAMA Awards	2022	Song of the Year	"Christmas Tree"	Longlisted	
MAMA Awards	2023	Album of the Year	Layover	Longlisted	
MAMA Awards	2023	Artist of the Year	V	Longlisted	
MAMA Awards	2023	Best Male Artist	V	Nominated	
MAMA Awards	2023	Best Vocal Performance – Male Solo	"Love Me Again"	Nominated	
MAMA Awards	2023	Song of the Year	"Love Me Again"	Longlisted	
MAMA Awards	2024	Fans' Choice Top 10 – Male	V	Won	
MAMA Awards	2025	Best Collaboration	"Winter Ahead"	Nominated	
MAMA Awards	2025	Song of the Year	"Winter Ahead"	Longlisted	
Melon Music Awards	2017	Best OST	"It's Definitely You"	Nominated	
Melon Music Awards	2023	Millions Top 10	Layover	Nominated	
Music Awards Japan	2025	Special Award: Oshi-Katsu Request Artist of the Year	V	Nominated	
Seoul International Drama Awards	2022	Outstanding Korean Drama OST	"Christmas Tree"	Nominated	
Soompi Awards	2018	Best Idol Actor (Note: for the role Suk Han-sung in Hwarang: The Poet Warrior Youth)	V	Won	
Soompi Awards	2019	Best Choreography	"Singularity"	Won	
SEC Awards	2024	Asian Artist of the Year	V	Won	
SEC Awards	2024	International Album of the Year Award	Layover	Won	
Seoul Music Awards	2024	Main Award (Bonsang)	V	Won	
Seoul Music Awards	2024	Fan Choice of the Year	V	Won	
Seoul Music Awards	2024	Hallyu Special Award	V	Nominated	
Seoul Music Awards	2024	Popularity Award	V	Nominated	
Top Ten Awards	2025	Best Solo Idol (Male)	V	Won	
Top Ten Awards	2026	Best Solo Idol (Male)	V	Won	
UK Music Video Awards	2024	Best Pop Video – International	"Fri(end)s"	Nominated	
Universal Superstar Awards	2024	Universal Super Artist	V	Won	

== Other accolades ==
=== State honors ===
Name of country, year given, and name of honor
Country or Organization	Year	Honor or Award	Ref.
National Tax Service Gyeonggi-do	2022	Conscientious taxpayer from Goyang-si, Gyeonggi-do	

=== Listicles ===
Name of publisher, year listed, name of listicle, and placement
Publisher	Year	Listicle	Placement	Ref.
Billboard	2024	K-Pop Artist 100	60th	
Billboard	2025	K-Pop Artist 100	89th	
Forbes Korea	2025	K-Idol of the Year 30	5th	
Forbes Korea	2026	Power Celebrity 40	7th	
TC Candler	2017	The 100 Most Handsome Faces	1st	

=== World records ===
List of world records held by V, showing the name of publication, the year the record was awarded, and the name of the record
Publication	Year	World record	Ref.
Guinness World Records	2021	Fastest time to reach 1 million followers on Instagram (Note: 43 minutes)	
Guinness World Records	2021	Fastest time to reach 10 million followers on Instagram (Note: 4 hours and 42 minutes)	

== See also ==
- List of awards and nominations received by BTS
