= 134340 =

134340 may refer to:

- 134340 Pluto, a dwarf planet in the Solar System
- "134340", a 2018 song by K-Pop boy band BTS from the album Love Yourself: Tear
- "134340 Pluto", a song by avant-garde metal band Cojum Dip from their eponymous 2014 album.
