= Gaho =

South Korean singer

- 가호
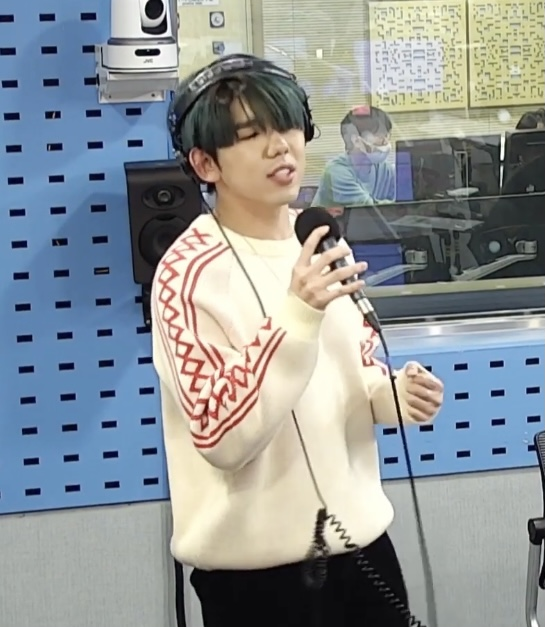
- Born: Kang Dae-ho; September 14, 1997 (age 28); Seoul, South Korea
- Occupations: Singer; songwriter; producer
- Musical career
- Genres: K-pop
- Instrument: Vocals
- Years active: 2018–present
- Labels: PLAN-G Entertainment

Korean name
- Hangul: 강대호
- Hanja: 姜大虎
- RR: Gang Daeho
- MR: Kang Taeho

Stage name
- Hangul: 가호
- RR: Gaho
- MR: Kaho

Kang Dae-ho (Korean: 강대호; born September 14, 1997), better known by his stage name Gaho (가호), is a South Korean singer, songwriter and producer under Planetarium Records.

== Early life ==
Gaho was born on September 14, 1997.

== Career ==
=== 2018–present: Solo debut ===
Gaho made his debut with the release of the soundtracks "Time", "Heart Is Beating" and "Not Over" for The Time, My Secret Terrius and The Last Empress respectively. On December 11, 2018 Gaho released his first mini album Preparation For a Journey. He released the singles "Fly" and "Pink Walk" in 2019. He rose to prominence with the original soundtrack "Start Over" for the JTBC drama Itaewon Class which charted number one on the Gaon Digital Chart. On March 26, 2020 he released the single "A Song for You". On May 24, 2021, he released "Rush Hour." On August 12, 2021, he released "Ride". On November 23, 2021, Gaho released his first studio album Fireworks. Praised for his unique vocals and wide range, Gaho is also known for his covers of KPop hit songs such as BTS' "Fire" and BlackPink's "How You Like That " and ''Shut Down'' often partnering with the band, KAVE.

== Discography ==
=== Studio albums ===
Title	Album details	Peak chart position	Sales
Title	Album details	KOR	Sales
Fireworks	Released: November 23, 2021; Label: Planetarium Records; Formats: CD, digital download; Track listing: 1. OOO; 2. Lost My Way; 3. Right Now; 4. Anyway (마음대로); 5. Rush Hour; 6. Afraid (겁이나); 7. Part Time Lover; 8. Ride; 9. High; 10. Crush (똑같애); 11. Friend; 12. Like the Moon	69	—N/a

=== Extended play ===
Title	EP details
Preparation for a Journey	Released: December 11, 2018; Label: Planetarium Records; Formats: CD, digital download; Track listing: 1. Intro: Stay Here; 2. Preparation For a Journey (떠날 준비); 3. Going On; 4. Then (그때); 5. Heaven

=== Singles ===
Title	Year	Peak chart position		Sales	Album
Title	Year	KOR Gaon	KOR Hot	Sales	Album
As lead artist
"Stay Here" (있어줘)	2018	—	—	—N/a	Preparation For a Journey
"Preparation For a Journey" (떠날 준비)	2018	—	—	—N/a	Preparation For a Journey
"Fly"	2019	—	—	—N/a	Non-album singles
"Pink Walk"	2019	—	—	—N/a	Non-album singles
"A Song For You"	2020	—	—	—N/a	Non-album singles
"Home"	2021	—	—	—N/a	Non-album singles
"Rush Hour"	2021	—	—	—N/a	Fireworks
"Ride"	2021	—	—	—N/a	Fireworks
"Right Now"	2021	— (Note: "Right Now" did not enter the Gaon Digital Chart, but peaked at number 106 on the Gaon Download Chart.)	—	—N/a	Fireworks
Soundtrack appearances
"Time" (시간)	2018	—	—	—N/a	The Time OST Part 1
"Heart Is Beating" (그렇게 가슴은 뛴다)	2018	—	—	—N/a	My Secret Terrius OST Part 1
"Not Over" (끝이 아니길)	2018	—	—	—N/a	The Last Empress OST Part 2
"Start Over" (시작)	2020	1	1	—N/a	Itaewon Class OST Part 2
"Wish" (바람)	2020	—	—	—N/a	Stranger 2 OST Part 3
"Running" (스타트업)	2020	—	—	—N/a	Start-up OST Part 5
"Memories"	2021	—	—	—N/a	Jirisan OST Part 2
"—" denotes releases that did not chart or were not released in that region.

== Awards and nominations ==
Year	Award	Category	Work(s)	Result	Ref.
2020	4th Soribada Best K-Music Awards	Best Hallyu OST	"Start Over"	Won	
2020	12th Melon Music Awards	Best OST Award	"Start Over"	Nominated	
2020	22nd Mnet Asian Music Awards	Best OST	"Start Over"	Won	
2020	22nd Mnet Asian Music Awards	Song of the Year	"Start Over"	Nominated	
2021	30th Seoul Music Awards	OST Award	"Start Over"	Nominated	
