= Champion (2018 film) =

2018 film by Kim Yong-wan

- Theatrical release poster
- Hangul: 챔피언
- RR: Chaempieon
- MR: Ch'aemp'iŏn
- Directed by: Kim Yong-wan
- Written by: Kim Yong-wan
- Produced by: Han Dong-hwan
- Starring: Ma Dong-seok; Kwon Yul; Han Ye-ri
- Cinematography: Yoo Ji-sun
- Edited by: Kim Chang-ju; Yi Ho-seung
- Distributed by: Warner Bros. Pictures
- Release date: May 1, 2018 (South Korea)
- Running time: 108 minutes
- Country: South Korea
- Language: Korean
- Box office: US$8.7 million

Champion (Korean: 챔피언) is a 2018 South Korean sports comedy film directed by Kim Yong-wan. The film stars Ma Dong-seok, Kwon Yul, and Han Ye-ri. It is related to arm wrestling competition. The movie is rated 9.4/10 in Asian TV Website within the first month of release.

== Plot ==
The film tells the story of the adopted Mark who was a former arm wrestler but now works as a bouncer. He goes to South Korea for a competition to search for his mother who gave him up for adoption as a child. With help of his friend, Jin-ki, Mark finds his real family, only to learn that his mother had died. He then meets his step-sister and her family whom he never knew. Through his mother's emails that he came to read he learned what it meant to feel her pain of abandoning him. He later wins the national tournament against his opponents and in the end, defeats the opponent named Punch in the final.

== Cast ==
- Ma Dong-seok as Mark / Baek Seung-min
- Kwon Yul as Jin-ki
- Han Ye-ri as Soo-jin
- Choi Seung-hoon as Joon-hyung
- Ok Ye-rin as Joon-hee

== Reception ==
On Rotten Tomatoes, the film has an approval rating of 89%, based on nine reviews, with an average rating of 6.3/10. The website's critic review for Champion reads: "Champion's biggest strengths are its comedic sensibilities, as director Kim Yong-Wan recognizes the inherent absurdity of arm-wrestling and plays it up for big laughs."

Frank Scheck of The Hollywood Reporter wrote:

"To say that the storyline is cliched is giving it more credit than it deserves. But the film manages to succeed anyway, thanks largely to the quiet charisma and likeability of its physically imposing leading man who manages to hold his own even playing opposite the scene-stealing tykes. "
