= Ok Ye-rin =

South Korean actress (born 2011)

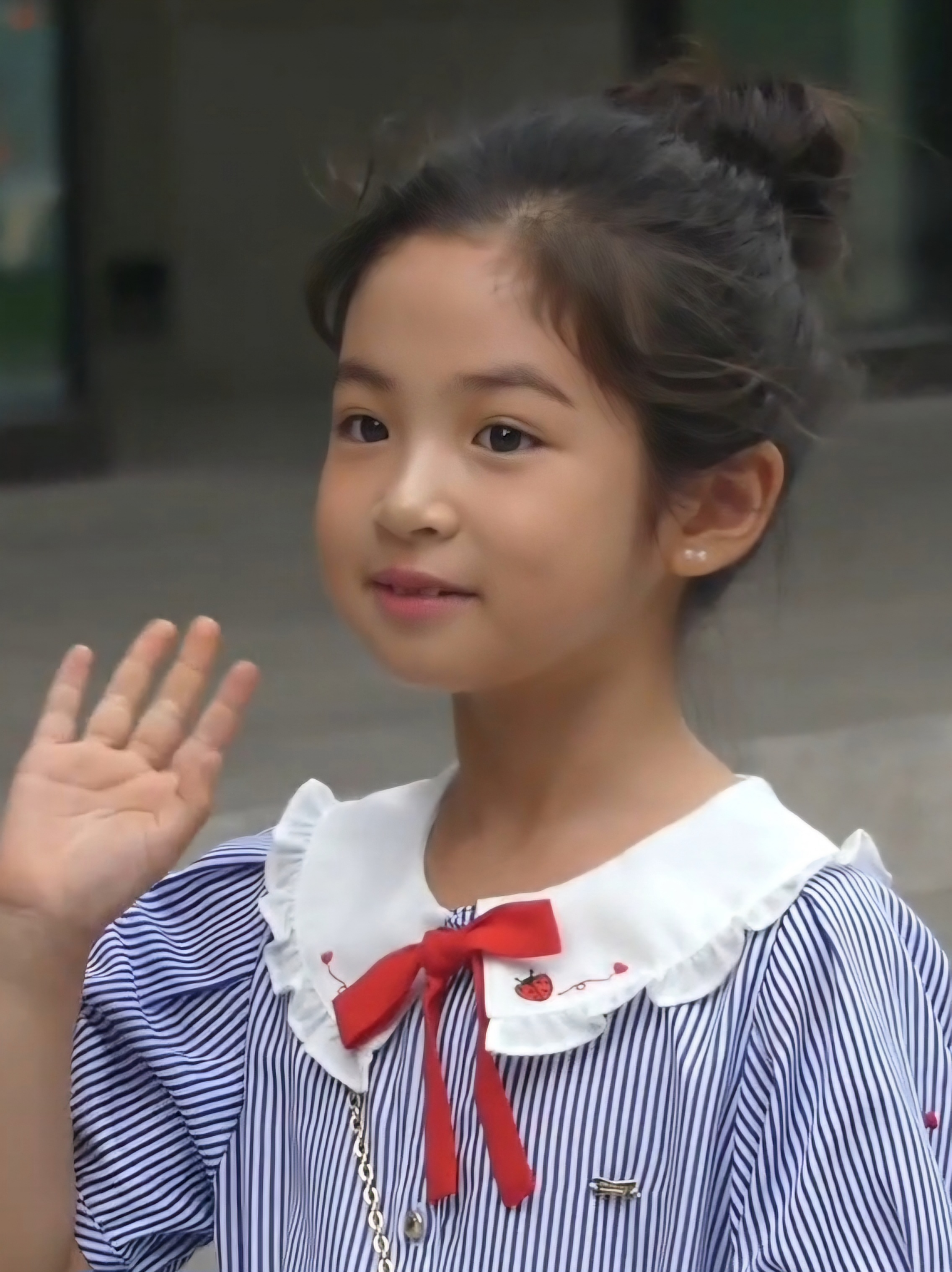
- Ok in 2019
- Born: 14 December 2011 (age 14); Seoul, South Korea
- Other name: Ok Ye-rin
- Occupation: Actress
- Years active: 2017–present
- Height: 163 cm (5 ft 4 in)
- Awards: Best Young Actress award at 2018 MBC Drama Awards

Korean name
- Hangul: 옥예린
- Hanja: 玉曳璘
- RR: Ok Yerin
- MR: Ok Yerin

Ok Ye-rin (Korean: 옥예린; born on 14 December 2011) is a South Korean child actress. She made her acting debut in 2017, since then, she has appeared in number of films and television series. She is known for her various roles as child actor as: My Secret Terrius (2018) and Itaewon Class (2020). She has acted in films also such as: Champion and Man of Men (2018) among others. In 2022 she appeared in romantic TV series Twenty-Five Twenty-One.

== Career ==
In 2018, she won the Best Young Actress award at 2018 MBC Drama Awards for her role of Cha Joon-hee in mystery drama My Secret Terrius.

Ok Ye-rin participated at the 'One K Concert for the 100th Anniversary of the March First Movement' held at the National Assembly in Yeouido, Seoul on March 1, 2019 and sang "Where the Wind Blows".

== Filmography ==
=== Films ===
Year	Title	Role	Notes	Ref.
2018	Champion	Joon-hee		
2018	Man of Men	Ji-eun		
2021	Kids Are Fine	Si-ah		

=== Television series ===
Year	Title	Role	Notes	Ref.
2017	Reunited Worlds		Special appearance	
2017	Black	Young Kang Ha-ram		
2017	Meloholic			
2017-18	Oh, the Mysterious	Young Cha Eun-bi		
2017-18	A Korean Odyssey	Han-byul		
2018	Come and Hug Me	Young Han Jae-yi		
2018	My Secret Terrius	Cha Joon-hee	Best Young Actress Award	
2019	The Crowned Clown			
2019	The Fiery Priest	Lim Ji-eun		
2019	Partners for Justice	Han Seo-hyeon	Season 2	
2019	Designated Survivor: 60 Days	Park Si-jin		
2019-20	Beautiful Love, Wonderful Life	Young Kim Yeon-ah		
2019-20	Woman of 9.9 Billion	Lee Yoo-ri		
2020	Itaewon Class	Young Oh Soo-ah		
2020	Nobody Knows	Yoon Ji-won		
2021	You Are My Spring	Young Kang Da-jeong		
2021-22	Bulgasal: Immortal Souls	Lee Hye Suk	Special appearance	
2022	Twenty-Five Twenty-One	Young Na Hee-do		

== Awards and nominations ==
Year	Award	Category	Nominated work	Result	Ref.
2018	MBC Drama Awards	Best Young Actress	My Secret Terrius as Cha Joon-hee	Won	
