= V (singer) =

South Korean singer (born 1995)

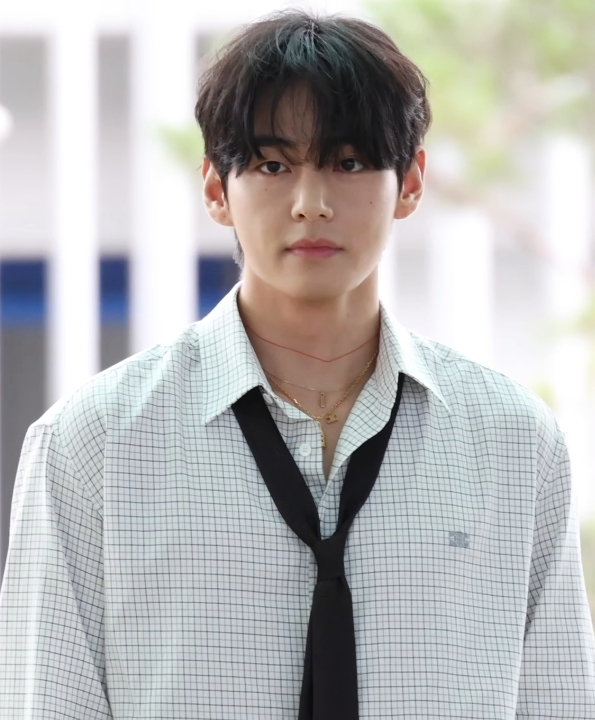
- V in 2025
- Born: Kim Tae-hyung; December 30, 1995 (age 30); Daegu, South Korea
- Education: Global Cyber University
- Occupations: Singer; songwriter
- Awards: Full list
- Honours: Hwagwan Order of Cultural Merit (2018)
- Musical career
- Genres: K-pop; R&B; neo soul; indie pop; jazz
- Instrument: Vocals
- Years active: 2013–present
- Label: Big Hit
- Member of: BTS

Korean name
- Hangul: 김태형
- Hanja: 金泰亨
- RR: Gim Taehyeong
- MR: Kim T'aehyŏng

Stage name
- Hangul: 뷔
- RR: Bwi
- MR: Pwi

Kim Tae-hyung (Korean: 김태형; born December 30, 1995), known professionally as V (뷔), is a South Korean singer. In 2013, he made his debut as a member of the South Korean boy band BTS, under Big Hit Entertainment. V has performed three solo songs under BTS's name—"Stigma" in 2016, "Singularity" in 2018, and "Inner Child" in 2020—all of which charted on South Korea's Gaon Digital Chart. Outside of his music projects with BTS, V had his acting debut in the 2016 television series Hwarang: The Poet Warrior Youth and, with Jin, contributed the single "It's Definitely You" to its soundtrack. He released his first independent song, the self-composed "Scenery", in 2019. In 2023, V made his official debut as a solo artist with the release of the singles "Love Me Again" and "Rainy Days". His debut solo EP Layover was released on September 8, 2023, accompanied by a third single, "Slow Dancing".

== Early life and education ==
V was born Kim Tae-hyung on December 30, 1995, in the Seo District of Daegu, and grew up in Geochang County. He is the eldest of three children, with a younger brother and sister. He is of the Gwangsan Kim clan. V first aspired to be a professional singer in elementary school. With his father's support, he began taking saxophone lessons in early middle school as a means of pursuing a musical career.

He eventually became a trainee for Big Hit Entertainment after passing an audition in Daegu. After graduating from Korean Arts High School in 2014, V enrolled in Global Cyber University, graduating in August 2020 with a major in Broadcasting and Entertainment. As of 2021, he is enrolled at Hanyang Cyber University, pursuing a Master of Business Administration in Advertising and Media.

== Career ==
=== 2013–present: BTS ===
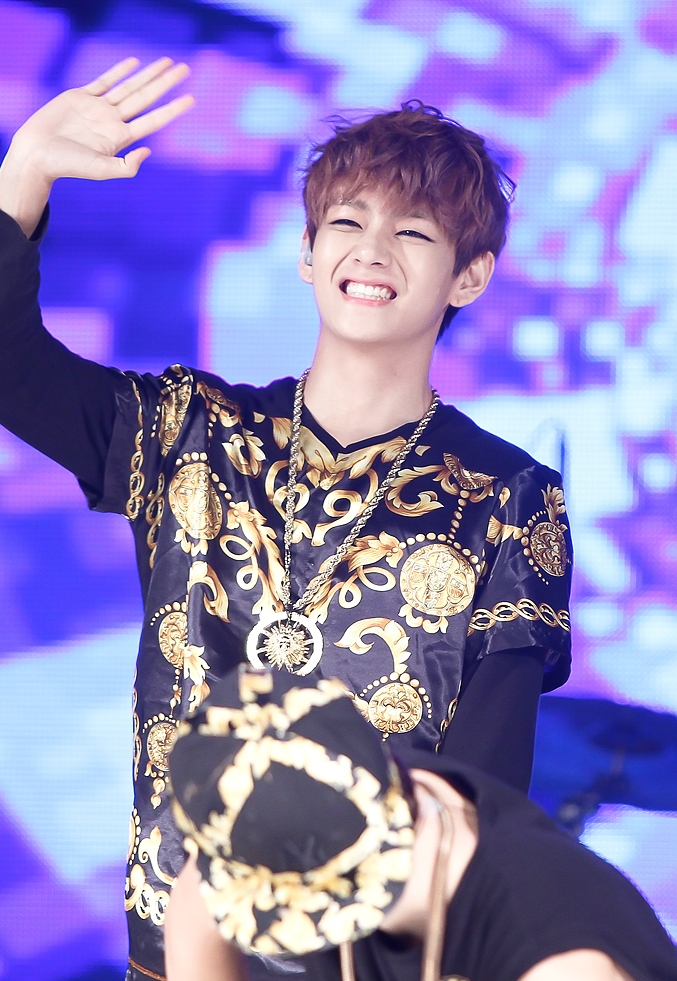
V in August 2013

Pre-debut, V was the "secret member" of BTS: fans were unaware of his existence as his agency wished to keep him a surprise. He later stated that the concept made him feel lonely and uneasy at the time as he thought it was because he might be cut from the lineup. On June 13, 2013, he made his debut as a member of BTS on Mnet's M Countdown with the track "No More Dream" from the band's debut single album 2 Cool 4 Skool. V was first credited for music composition on The Most Beautiful Moment in Life, Pt. 1 (2015) extended play (EP), as a co-writer and producer of the song "Hold Me Tight"; he also contributed lyrics for the song "Fun Boyz". On the band's follow up EP, The Most Beautiful Moment in Life, Pt. 2, V's melody was used for the song "Run". He co-wrote and composed his first solo track "Stigma" for BTS's 2016 studio album Wings. He also released, unofficially, a cover of "Hug Me" with bandmate J-Hope, and "Someone Like You" by Adele.

In May 2018, V's second solo song, "Singularity", was released as a trailer for BTS's then-upcoming third studio album, Love Yourself: Tear. The track made its UK radio debut on BBC Radio on October 25. One month after its release, The Guardian added "Singularity" to its "Top 50 songs for the month of June 2018" playlist, and Billboard included it in their critics' list of the "Top 50 BTS songs" at number 28. Overall, "Singularity" was generally well received by critics and mentioned on several year-end critic's lists. The New York Times ranked it twentieth on its list of "The 65 Best Songs of 2018" alongside "Fake Love", Los Angeles Times critic Mikael Wood named it the fourth "best and most replay worthy song of 2018", and Guardian critic Laura Snapes included it as one of her favourite tracks in her "Best Music of 2018: Albums and Tracks" list.

On October 24, 2018, V became one of the youngest recipients of the fifth-class Hwagwan Order of Cultural Merit medal, awarded to him by Moon Jae-in, the President of South Korea alongside his BTS bandmates for their role in the spread of Korean culture.

V and J-Hope collaborated with Swedish singer Zara Larsson on the song "A Brand New Day" for the soundtrack album of the BTS World mobile game. It was released as a single on June 14, 2019, and debuted at number one on Billboard's World Digital Song Sales chart. He next collaborated with bandmate Jimin on the song "Friends"—later used in the 2021 Marvel film Eternals—and helped compose and write his third solo song "Inner Child", both of which were included on BTS's 2020 studio album Map of the Soul: 7.

In July 2021, V was appointed Special Presidential Envoy for Future Generations and Culture by South Korean President Moon Jae-in, alongside his bandmates, to help "lead the global agenda for future generations" and "expand South Korea's diplomatic efforts and global standing" in the international community.

=== 2016–present: Solo activities ===
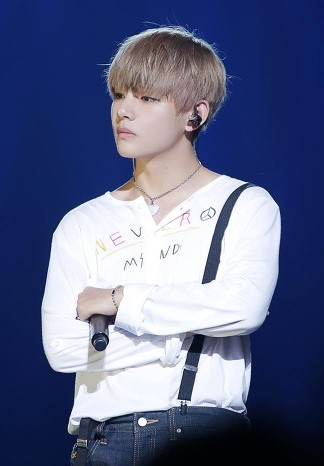
V in Kobe, Japan during The Most Beautiful Moment in Life On Stage Tour, March 23, 2016

In 2016, V made his acting debut with a supporting role in KBS2's historical drama Hwarang: The Poet Warrior Youth under his real name. He also collaborated with bandmate Jin on the duet single "It's Definitely You" for the show's soundtrack. In celebration of BTS's fourth anniversary, V released "4 O'Clock" on June 8, 2017, a song he co-produced with bandmate RM.

V released his first independent song, "Scenery", on January 30, 2019, through the BTS SoundCloud page. V wrote and composed the ballad and photographed the cover art himself. The track was produced by Big Hit producer Docskim, with additional contributions from Pdogg and Hiss Noise. It reached 100 million streams from 20 million in over fourteen days, a new record on the platform. Over the course of the two weeks following its release, "Scenery" broke the daily streaming record nine times. Seven months later, V released his second solo and first all-English song, "Winter Bear", through SoundCloud, accompanied by a self-directed music video via BTS's YouTube channel on August 9. He co-produced the track with RM, Hiss Noise, and Adora, and photographed the cover artwork under his pseudonym Vante.

In 2020, V contributed the indie pop single "Sweet Night" to the soundtrack of the JTBC drama Itaewon Class, released on March 13. Self-written and produced, it received generally favorable reviews for its composition, vocal performance and warm lyrics, debuting at number two on Billboard's Digital Songs chart in the United States. On December 25, he released the Christmas-themed song "Snow Flower" featuring Peakboy. A second holiday song, "Christmas Tree", followed in December 2021 as part of the original soundtrack for the Studio N television series Our Beloved Summer. Released as a digital single on December 24, it debuted at number 79 on the Billboard Hot 100, earning V his first solo entry on the chart.

Switching over to television in 2022, V starred in the Disney+ reality series In the Soop: Friendcation with Peakboy, Park Seo-joon, Choi Woo-shik, and Park Hyung-sik; it premiered in July and ended in August.

He appeared in a second reality series, the Prime Video exclusive cooking-travel show Jinny's Kitchen, alongside Park Seo-joon and Choi, in February 2023. The following month, he was announced as a brand ambassador for the Indonesian investment company SimInvest and a global ambassador for the French luxury brand Celine. He became a brand ambassador for Cartier and the face of the Panthère de Cartier campaign in July. After that, Seoul Tourism announced V as the honorary tourism ambassador of Seoul 2023. "Scenery", "Winter Bear", and "Snow Flower" were made available on digital download and streaming platforms worldwide as official singles on August 28, ahead of V's debut solo EP Layover, which was released on September 8. Per Hanteo Chart, Layover recorded the highest first-week sales by a K-pop solo artist in history, with 2.1 million copies sold. In the US, it debuted at number two on the Billboard 200, tying V with bandmates Jimin and Suga (Note: as Agust D) as the highest-charting Korean solo artists in Billboard chart history. In December, Compose Coffee officially announced V as its brand ambassador. In the same month, the single "Wherever U R" by UMI featuring V was released.

He became a global ambassador for electronics company Nothing in September 2026.

== Artistry ==
V possesses a baritone singing voice that has received a generally positive critical reception, with particular praise for his vocal range and "husky" tone. He gained wider vocal recognition for his performance of "Stigma", and was praised for his falsettos that showed off his vocal range and unique musicality. V's tonality on "Singularity", the opening track of BTS's Love Yourself: Tear (2018), was noted as a prominent "tone setter" on the album by music critic Blanca Méndez. Similarly, Katie Goh of Vice deemed it as "one of V's best vocal performances." Karen Ruffini of Elite Daily stated in their article that "V... has no problem producing super soothing, low tones that are a key element in the overall sound for BTS", with Tamar Herman from Billboard also noting that V's lower range is a prominent piece of BTS's music. V's musicality is heavily influenced by his love for jazz and classical music. Eric Benet and Ruben Studdard are among his inspirations.

As a performer, V is known for his "duality", or his ability to evoke various emotions on stage. British journalist Rhian Daly, writing for NME, particularly noted this when discussing V's performance of "Singularity" during the Love Yourself: Speak Yourself World Tour, describing his movements as "precise and deliberate". Crystal Bell from MTV noted V's performances often work with live cameras in concert venues, and how he utilizes them to create subtle expressions during performances.

== Impact and influence ==
V coined the phrase "I purple you" during BTS's fanmeeting in November 2016; since then, purple has become a symbol of BTS and their fans. UNICEF used the phrase in their anti-bullying campaign with BTS.

In 2018, Eugene Investment & Securities Co., Ltd. conducted analytical research on Google search trends relating to the K-pop industry. "V" ranked first on the chart as the most-searched keyword for the past five years in South Korea. In a survey conducted by Gallup Korea, V was chosen as the fourth most-preferred idol of 2019, previously ranking ninth in 2018. In 2021, he ranked as the most popular Korean celebrity in Japan for twenty-eight consecutive weeks.

Various artists have cited him as an influence and role model: The Boyz's Younghoon and Hwall; Golden Child's Jaehyun and Jangjun; MVP's Been; Rainz's Byun Hyun-min; Cravity's Serim; Ateez's Yeosang and Mingi; D-Crunch's Jungseung and Dyla; Lucente's Bao; Newkidd's Yunmin; Boy Story's Hanyu; Tomorrow X Together's Beomgyu; Produce X 101 contestants Koo Jungmo, Lee Taeseung and Mahiro Hidaka; and former Wanna One member Park Ji-hoon.

== Personal life ==
Since 2018, V has lived in Hannam-dong, Seoul, South Korea, with his bandmates.

=== Health ===
In October 2018, during the Love Yourself World Tour concert in Paris, V had difficulty singing due to an illness and had to abstain from some of his parts during the concert. In October 2021, V's agency announced he would abstain from choreography during their Permission to Dance on Stage concerts due to a calf injury and would remain seated while singing. In August 2026, he stated that he was receiving treatment for hearing loss in his right ear, which he reported was functioning at approximately one-third the level of his left ear.

=== Philanthropy ===
In March 2025, V donated ₩200 million (US$149,223) through the Korean Red Cross to help in the recovery efforts from wildfires that occurred in the Ulsan, Gyeongbuk, and Gyeongnam regions.

=== Military service ===
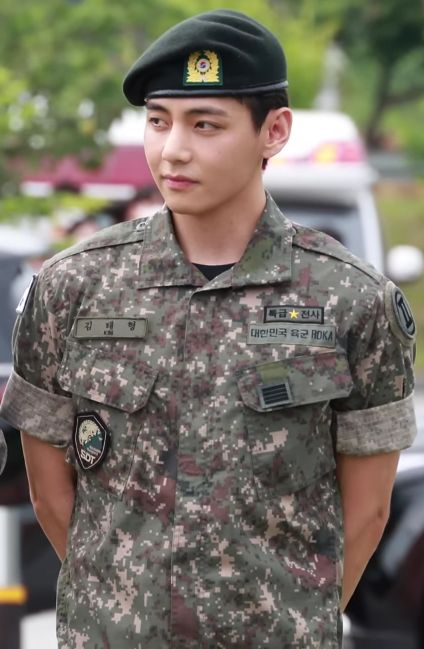
V on June 10, 2025

On November 22, 2023, Big Hit announced through Weverse that V, along with bandmates RM, Jimin, and Jungkook, had started the enlistment process to carry out his mandatory military service. He enlisted on December 11. Upon completion of his extended military training, he was assigned to the 'Ssangyong Unit' of the 2nd Corps on February 8, 2024, serving under the Special Task Force of the Military Police Corps. He was formally discharged on June 10, 2025.

== Discography ==
=== Extended plays ===
List of extended plays, showing selected details and chart positions, and sales figures
Title	Details	Peak chart positions										Sales	Certifications
Title	Details	KOR	CAN	FRA	GER	ITA	JPN	JPN Hot	NZ	UK Dig.	US	Sales	Certifications
Layover	Released: September 8, 2023; Label: Big Hit; Formats: CD, digital download, streaming	1	39	6	4	12	2	2	3	1	2	KOR: 2,236,119; JPN: 262,033; US: 88,000; WW: 2,200,000	RIAJ: Gold; KMCA: Million; KMCA: 2× Platinum (Note: Weverse Albums version)

=== Singles ===
==== As lead artist ====
Title	Year	Peak chart positions										Sales	Album
Title	Year	KOR	KOR Billb.	CAN	HUN	JPN Hot	NZ	UK	US	US World	WW	Sales	Album
"It's Definitely You" (죽어도 너야) (with Jin)	2016	34	—	—	15	—	—	—	—	8	—	KOR: 76,657	Hwarang: The Poet Warrior Youth Original Soundtrack
"Scenery" (풍경)	2019	—	—	—	—	— (Note: "Scenery" did not enter the Billboard Japan Hot 100, but peaked at number four on the component Download Songs chart.)	—	— (Note: "Scenery" did not enter the UK Singles Chart, but peaked at number 37 on the UK Singles Downloads Chart.)	— (Note: "Scenery" did not enter the Billboard Hot 100, but peaked at number 46 on the Digital Songs chart.)	3	—		Non-album singles
"Winter Bear"	2019	—	—	—	—	— (Note: "Winter Bear" did not enter the Billboard Japan Hot 100, but peaked at number three on the component Download Songs chart.)	—	— (Note: "Winter Bear" did not enter the UK Singles Chart, but peaked at number 33 on the UK Singles Downloads Chart.)	— (Note: "Winter Bear" did not enter the Billboard Hot 100, but peaked at number 36 on the Digital Songs chart.)	—	—	JPN: 6,793	Non-album singles
"Sweet Night"	2020	14	19	— (Note: "Sweet Night" did not enter the Canadian Hot 100, but peaked at number 18 on the Canadian Digital Song Sales chart.)	1	— (Note: "Sweet Night" did not enter the Billboard Japan Hot 100, but peaked at number 10 on the component Download Songs chart.)	— (Note: "Sweet Night" did not enter the NZ Singles Chart, but peaked at number 34 on the NZ Hot Singles Chart.)	— (Note: "Sweet Night" did not enter the UK Singles Chart, but peaked at number 10 on the UK Singles Downloads Chart.)	— (Note: "Sweet Night" did not enter the Billboard Hot 100, but peaked at number two on the Digital Songs chart.)	—	—		Itaewon Class Original Soundtrack
"Snow Flower" (featuring Peakboy)	2020	—	—	—	—	— (Note: "Snow Flower" did not enter the Billboard Japan Hot 100, but peaked at number six on the component Download Songs chart.)	—	—	— (Note: "Snow Flower" did not enter the Billboard Hot 100, but peaked at number 43 on the Digital Songs chart.)	2	—	JPN: 6,203	Non-album single
"Christmas Tree"	2021	18	25	82	1	29	— (Note: "Christmas Tree" did not enter the NZ Singles Chart, but peaked at number 6 on the NZ Hot Singles Chart.)	— (Note: "Christmas Tree" did not enter the UK Singles Chart, but peaked at number 2 on the UK Singles Downloads Chart.)	79	—	51		Our Beloved Summer Original Soundtrack
"Love Me Again"	2023	22	7	91	—	76	— (Note: "Love Me Again" did not enter the NZ Singles Chart, but peaked at number 5 on the NZ Hot Singles Chart.)	— (Note: "Love Me Again" did not enter the UK Singles Chart, but peaked at number 9 on the UK Singles Downloads Chart.)	96	1	12	JPN: 7,226	Layover
"Rainy Days"	2023	56	21	— (Note: "Rainy Days" did not enter the Canadian Hot 100, but peaked at number 12 on the Canadian Digital Song Sales chart.)	—	91	— (Note: "Rainy Days" did not enter the NZ Singles Chart, but peaked at number 7 on the NZ Hot Singles Chart.)	— (Note: "Rainy Days" did not enter the UK Singles Chart, but peaked at number 6 on the UK Singles Downloads Chart.)	— (Note: "Rainy Days" did not enter the Billboard Hot 100, but peaked at number 18 on the Bubbling Under Hot 100.)	—	16	JPN: 7,362	Layover
"Slow Dancing"	2023	24	9	60	—	26	38	24	51	—	4	JPN: 12,134; WW: 54,000	Layover
"Fri(end)s"	2024	101	—	38	—	38	22	13	65	—	5	JPN: 11,855	Non-album singles
"Winter Ahead" (with Park Hyo-shin)	2024	70	23	—	—	—	— (Note: "Winter Ahead" did not enter the NZ Singles Chart, but peaked at number 4 on the NZ Hot Singles Chart.)	86	99	—	33	JPN: 8,209	Non-album singles
"White Christmas" (Remix) (with Bing Crosby)	2024	180	—	—	—	—	— (Note: "White Christmas" (Remix) did not enter the NZ Singles Chart, but peaked at number 13 on the NZ Hot Singles Chart.)	—	93	—	72	JPN: 4,413	Non-album singles
"—" denotes releases that did not chart, were not eligible to chart, or were not released in that region.

==== As featured artist ====
Title	Year	Peak chart positions						Sales	Album
Title	Year	CAN Dig.	JPN Dig.	NZ Hot	UK Dig.	US Dig.	WW	Sales	Album
"Wherever U R" (Umi featuring V)	2023	10	9	3	6	5	99	JPN: 6,000; US: 4,600	Non-album single

=== Other charted songs ===
Title	Year	Peak chart positions										Sales	Album
Title	Year	KOR	KOR Hot	CAN Dig.	HUN	JPN Dig.	JPN Hot	UK Dig.	US Dig.	US World	WW	Sales	Album
"Stigma" (Note: credited under BTS but is a solo performed by V)	2016	26	—	—	8	—	—	—	22	1	—	KOR: 110,898	Wings
"Intro: Singularity"	2016	54	10	40	23	—	34	—	44	1	—	US: 10,000	Love Yourself: Tear
"Inner Child"	2020	24	19	30	7	—	—	22	9	1	—		Map of the Soul: 7
"Blue"	2023	144	—	22	—	13	100	89	12	—	89	JPN: 2,661	Layover
"For Us"	2023	151	—	27	—	15	— (Note: "For Us" did not enter the Billboard Japan Hot 100, but peaked at number 10 on the component Download Songs chart.)	85	49	—	113	JPN: 2,596	Layover
"Slow Dancing" (Piano version)	2023	— (Note: "Slow Dancing" (Piano version) did not enter the Circle Digital Chart, but peaked at number 13 on the component Download Chart.)	—	—	—	19	— (Note: "Slow Dancing" (Piano version) did not enter the Billboard Japan Hot 100, but peaked at number 22 on the component Download Songs chart.)	—	—	—	—	JPN: 2,261	Layover
"Slow Dancing" (FNRK remix)	2023	— (Note: "Slow Dancing" (FNRK remix) did not enter the Circle Digital Chart, but peaked at number 101 on the component Download Chart.)	—	—	—	28	—	—	—	—	—	JPN: 1,891	Slow Dancing (Remixes)
"Slow Dancing" (Cautious Clay remix)	2023	— (Note: "Slow Dancing" (Cautious Clay remix) did not enter the Circle Digital Chart, but peaked at number 149 on the component Download Chart.)	—	—	—	32	—	—	—	—	—	JPN: 1,799	Slow Dancing (Remixes)
"Fri(end)s" (Instrumental)	2024	— (Note: "Fri(end)s" (Instrumental) did not enter the Circle Digital Chart, but peaked at number 81 on the component Download Chart.)	—	—	—	16	—	—	—	—	—	JPN: 2,404	Fri(end)s (Remixes)
"Fri(end)s" (Sped Up)	2024	— (Note: "Fri(end)s" (Sped Up) did not enter the Circle Digital Chart, but peaked at number 76 on the component Download Chart.)	—	—	—	32	—	—	—	—	—	JPN: 1,425	Fri(end)s (Remixes)
"Fri(end)s" (Slowed Down)	2024	— (Note: "Fri(end)s" (Slowed Down) did not enter the Circle Digital Chart, but peaked at number 79 on the component Download Chart.)	—	—	—	34	—	—	—	—	—	JPN: 1,380	Fri(end)s (Remixes)
"Winter Ahead" (Instrumental) (with Park Hyo-shin)	2024	— (Note: "Winter Ahead" (Instrumental) did not enter the Circle Digital Chart, but peaked at number 194 on the component Download Chart.)	—	—	—	31	—	—	—	—	—		Non-album songs
"Winter Ahead" (Silent Carol version) (with Park Hyo-shin)	2024	— (Note: "Winter Ahead" (Silent Carol version) did not enter the Circle Digital Chart, but peaked at number 97 on the component Download Chart.)	—	—	—	—	—	—	—	—	—	JPN: 1,418	Non-album songs
"White Christmas" (Remix Instrumental) (with Bing Crosby)	2024	— (Note: "White Christmas" (Remix Instrumental) did not enter the Circle Digital Chart, but peaked at number 133 on the component Download Chart.)	—	—	—	23	—	—	—	—	—	JPN: 1,953	Non-album songs
"Winter Ahead" (Yun Seok-cheol Trio version) (with Park Hyo-shin)	2024	— (Note: "Winter Ahead" (Yun Seok-cheol Trio version) did not enter the Circle Digital Chart, but peaked at number 37 on the component Download Chart.)	—	—	—	24	—	—	—	—	—	JPN: 1,456	Non-album songs
"—" denotes releases that did not chart, were not eligible to chart, or were not released in that region.

==== Other songs ====
List of other songs released, showing year, other performing artist(s), and album name
Title	Year	Other artist(s)	Album	Ref.
"95 Graduation" (Note: uses the original melody from Lupe Fiasco's "Old School Love")	2014	Jimin	Non-album releases	
"4 O'Clock"	2017	RM	Non-album releases	

=== Writing credits ===
All song credits are adapted from the Korea Music Copyright Association's (KOMCA) database unless noted otherwise.

Name of song, featured performers, original release, and year of release
Song	Artist(s)	Album	Year
"4 O'Clock"	RM and V	Non-album releases	2017
"95 Graduation"	Jimin and V	Non-album releases	2014
"Blue & Grey"	BTS	Be	2020
"Boyz with Fun"	BTS	The Most Beautiful Moment in Life, Part 1	2015
"Hold Me Tight"	BTS	The Most Beautiful Moment in Life, Part 1	2015
"In the Soop"	BTS	Non-album release	2020
"Inner Child"	BTS	Map of the Soul: 7	2020
"Introduction: Youth"	BTS	Youth	2016
"Outro: Circle Room Cypher"	BTS	2 Cool 4 Skool	2013
"Run"	BTS	The Most Beautiful Moment in Life, Part 2	2015
"Run" (Alternative Mix)	BTS	The Most Beautiful Moment in Life: Young Forever	2016
"Run" (Ballad Mix)	BTS	The Most Beautiful Moment in Life: Young Forever	2016
"Scenery"	V	Non-album releases	2019
"Snow Flower"	V and Peakboy	Non-album releases	2020
"Stigma"	BTS	Wings	2016
"Sweet Night"	V	Itaewon Class Original Soundtrack	2020
"Winter Bear"	V	Non-album release	2019

== Videography ==
=== Music videos ===
Name of music video, year released, director, and additional notes
Title	Year	Director(s) (Note: only included if mentioned by a reliable secondary source)	Description	Ref.
"Singularity Comeback trailer"	2018	Yong-seok Choi (Lumpens)	V sings the song while performing choreography together with a small group of male dancers, and on his own in a dark space surrounded by white theater masks while dressed in white. He is also seen in dark clothing surrounded by flowers and thorns, and interacting with a reflective pool of water. At the end, V dons a white mask with a single, black tear dripping from one eye.	
"Winter Bear"	2019	V	A retro-inspired music video comprising clips of V exploring Los Angeles, New York, Paris, and London on his own during BTS's Love Yourself: Speak Yourself World Tour. Shown with his cameras in hand, the video also includes shots of animals, landscapes, and architecture taken by V.	
"Sweet Night"	2020	Unknown	Comprises various scenes from Itaewon Class. V does not appear in the video, but is heard singing in its audio.	
"Christmas Tree"	2021	Unknown	Comprises footage of Choi Woo-shik and Kim Da-mi from Our Beloved Summer. V does not appear in the video, but is heard singing in its audio.	
"Love Me Again"	2023		Filmed in a cave in Mallorca, V performs the song dressed in sequined clothing and surrounded by analog television screens that display the lyrics karaoke-style as he sings.	
"Rainy Days"	2023	Shin Dongle	V spends a "gloomy" day at home alone in his retro-styled apartment. He is shown lying around in bed, preparing food while his dog looks on, watching cartoons, working in his art studio, and falling asleep while the cartoons play in the background.	
"Slow Dancing"	2023		V takes a road trip with friends through the mountains to a sunny beach. They spend time in the water, dancing on the shore, and watching the night sky while on a yacht. The video ends with a shot of V and his pet dog Yeontan together on the terrace of a building.	
"Blue"	2023		A grayscale video, V drives around looking for someone. He pounds on the door of an apartment and becomes increasingly impatient with each unanswered knock and phone call. He searches potted plants for a spare key to the apartment, drives around some more, then returns to the same building and sits on a swing set outside, looking melancholy as his search was unsuccessful. In the background, a woman lets a small dog (presumed to be V's) off a leash and it runs towards him.	
"For Us"	2023		Comprises outtakes and behind-the-scenes footage from the music videos for "Love Me Again, "Rainy Days", "Slow Dancing", and "Blue", presented in the style of a "vintage home video".	
"Fri(end)s"	2024	Samuel Bradley	Actress Ruby Sear appears in the video as V's girlfriend. V is shown alone in his apartment then surrounded by happy couples wherever he goes until he is hit by a car while crossing the street. The video repeats the previous scenes, but this time V is seen with his girlfriend while the couples around them fight and break up. He is hit by a car once again, and wakes up next to himself in bed at the end.	

- V also appeared in BTS Wings Short Film #3 Stigma, a short film released in September 2016 in promotion of BTS's fourth studio album Wings.

== Filmography ==
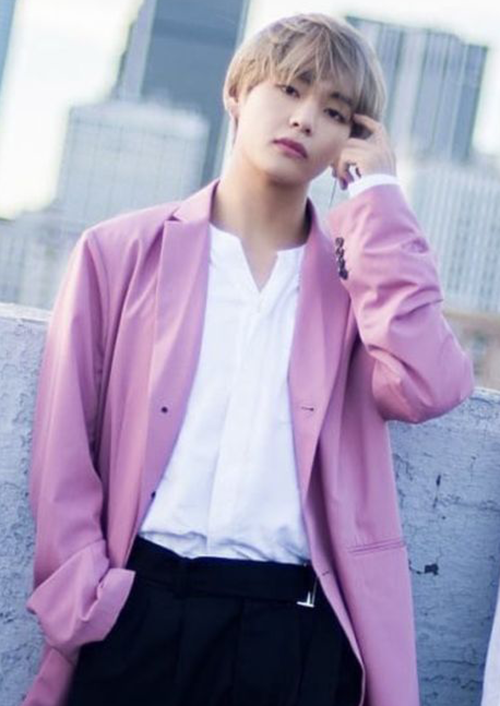
V in a photoshoot for D Icon magazine, November 2017

=== Television ===
V television work
Year	Title	Role	Note(s)	Ref.
2014	Show! Music Core	Himself	Host, with Kim So-hyun	
2015	Music Bank	Himself	Host, with Park Bo-gum and Himchan of B.A.P	
2015	Show! Music Core	Himself	Host, with Zico and Kim So-hyun	
2016	Celebrity Bromance	Himself	Season 1, episodes 1–4; with Kim Min-jae	
2016	Inkigayo	Himself	Host, with J-Hope, Moonbyul, and Wheein	
2016–2017	Hwarang: The Poet Warrior Youth	Seok Han-sung	Supporting role	
2017	Music Bank (Singapore Special)	Himself	Host, with Park Bo-gum and Irene	
2017	Inkigayo Super Concert in Daejeon	Himself	Host, with Jisoo and Jinyoung	
2022	In the Soop: Friendcation	Himself	Cast member	
2023	Jinny's Kitchen	Himself	Prime Video exclusive series; cast member	
2023	Jinny's Kitchen: Team Building	Himself	Prime Video exclusive series; cast member	

=== Music video appearances ===
Title	Year	Other performer(s) credited	Director	Description	Ref.
"Love Wins All"	2024	IU	Um Tae-hwa	Set in a post-apocalyptic, dystopian world where humans are hunted and killed by ominous floating Cubes, IU and V portray a couple on the run. They briefly avoid detection by hiding out in an abandoned mall, where they find a camcorder that shows them an alternate, happier reality when they look into its viewfinder. Subsequent scenes show them pretending to have a romantic dinner, taking wedding photos, and dancing at a party. A Cube eventually finds and chases them through the mall before they meet their demise. Their deaths are not shown on-screen, but the camcorder captures their final moment together.	
