= My Secret Terrius =

2018 South Korean television series

- Also known as: My Secret, Terrius; Code Name: Terrius
- Hangul: 내 뒤에 테리우스
- Lit.: Terrius Behind Me
- RR: Nae dwie Teriuseu
- MR: Nae twie T'eriusŭ
- Genre: Romantic-comedy; Mystery
- Created by: Kang Dae-sun
- Written by: Oh Ji-young
- Directed by: Park Sang-hun
- Starring: So Ji-sub; Jung In-sun; Son Ho-jun; Im Se-mi
- Country of origin: Korean
- Original language: Korean
- No. of episodes: 32 (Note: In order to circumvent Korean laws that prevent commercial breaks in the middle of an episode, what would previously have been aired as single 70 minute episodes are now being repackaged as two 35 minute episodes, with two episodes being shown each night with a commercial break between the two.)

Production
- Executive producers: Kang Dae-sun; Yoo Byung-sul
- Producer: Namkoong Sung-woo
- Production locations: China; Poland (Warsaw)
- Camera setup: Single-camera
- Running time: 35 minutes
- Production companies: MBC; Mong-jak-so Co., Ltd.

Original release
- Network: MBC TV
- Release: September 27 – November 15, 2018

My Secret Terrius (Korean: 내 뒤에 테리우스; RR: Nae dwie Teriuseu) is a 2018 South Korean television series starring So Ji-sub, Jung In-sun, Son Ho-jun and Im Se-mi. It was aired on MBC from September 27 to November 15, 2018 on Wednesdays and Thursdays at 21:55 (KST).

== Synopsis ==
A woman named Go Ae-rin (Jung In-sun) loses her husband. Along with her neighbour Kim Bon (So Ji-sub), who was an NIS agent, they discover the truth behind her husband's involvement in a huge conspiracy.

== Cast ==
=== Main ===
- So Ji-sub as Kim Bon (Terrius)

A legendary black ops agent at the National Intelligence Service (NIS).

- Jung In-sun as Go Ae-rin (Alice)

A single mother who finds herself getting caught up in solving a conspiracy with Kim Bon.

- Son Ho-jun as Jin Young-tae

A former con man who holds the key to a mysterious incident that Go Ae-rin and Kim Bon are involved in.

- Im Se-mi as Yoo Ji-yeon

An NIS agent who is cold on the outside, but warm to Kim Bon, whom she has feelings for.

=== Supporting ===
==== NIS agent ====
- Um Hyo-sup as Shim Woo-cheol

Head of the NIS who values patriotism, loyalty and camaraderie.

- Seo Yi-sook as Kwon Yeong-sil

Second-in-command and deputy director of the NIS. She is an ambitious, cold and calculating woman who hopes to take control of the agency, and who holds a secret about the conspiracy.

- Kim Sung-joo as Ra Do-woo/

A genius hacker who is rebellious. He likes Yoo Ji-yeon.

==== KIS agent ====
Kingcastle is the housing complex where both Kim Bon and Go Ae-rin live. A closely bound community, it has a Kingcastle Information System (KIS).

- Kim Yeo-jin as Shim Eun-ha

A woman with superb organizing and investigative skills, she is the chief of KIS.

- Jung Si-ah as Bong Sun-mi

A KIS agent who has a crush on Kim Bon.

- Kang Ki-young as Kim Sang-ryeol

A househusband, the only male KIS agent in the team.

=== Others ===
- Yang Dong-geun as Cha Jung-il
- Park Ji-hyun as Clara Choi
- Kim Gun-woo as Cha Jun-soo
- Ok Ye-rin as Cha Joon-hee
- Hwang Ji-ah as Jo Seo-hyun
- Lee Joo-won as Jo Seung-hyun
- Kim Dan-woo as Han Yoo-ra
- Oh Han-kyul as Kim Seung-gi
- Jasper Cho as K
- Lee Hyun-geol as Park Soo-il
- Kim Byeong-ok as Yoon Choon-sang
- Kim Ji-eun as Yong-tae's secretary
- Park Soon-cheon as Lee Ji-sook
- Mirosław Zbrojewicz as a following spy
- Mateusz Bąkowski (Polish pianist, teacher music)

=== Special appearance ===
- Kim Myung-soo as Moon Sung-soo

Head of the national security at the Blue House.

- Nam Gyu-ri as Choi Eun-kyung

A nuclear physicist from North Korea, and Kim Bon's ex-girlfriend.

- Yoon Sang-hyun as Yoo Ji-sub (ep 17, 19 & 20)

Obgyn surgeon, brother of Yoo Ji-yeon

- Lee Jun-hyeok

a shaman (ep. 11)

== Production ==
- Lee Yoo-young and Yoo In-na were offered the female lead role but declined.
- The first script reading took place in late June, 2018 at MBC Broadcasting Station in Sangam, South Korea.

== Original soundtrack ==
My Secret Terrius OST

Soundtrack album by Various artists
- Recorded: 2018
- Genre: Soundtrack
- Languages: Korean; English
- Labels: Blending Co., Ltd

=== Part 1 ===
Released on October 3, 2018
No.	Title	Lyrics	Music	Artist	Length
1.	"Heart Is Beating" (그렇게 가슴은 뛴다)	Seo Dong-sung	Park Sung-il	Gaho	04:15
2.	"Heart Is Beating" (Inst.)		Park Sung-il		04:15
Total length:					08:30

=== Part 2 ===
Released on October 10, 2018
No.	Title	Lyrics	Music	Artist	Length
1.	"Shining" (눈부셔)	Seo Dong-sung	Park Sung-il	Suran	03:37
2.	"Shining" (Inst.)		Park Sung-il		03:37
Total length:					07:14

=== Part 3 ===
Released on October 17, 2018
No.	Title	Lyrics	Music	Artist	Length
1.	"One Day"	Lee Chi-hoon	Kim Min-seung	Kim Min-seung	03:16
2.	"One Day" (Inst.)		Kim Min-seung		03:13
Total length:					06:32

=== Part 4 ===
Released on October 31, 2018
No.	Title	Lyrics	Music	Artist	Length
1.	"Shout To The Sky" (하늘에 외치다)	Lee Chi-hoon	Park Sung-il	Eunjung	04:25
2.	"Shout To The Sky" (Inst.)		Park Sung-il		04:25
Total length:					08:50

=== Part 5 ===
Released on November 8, 2018
No.	Title	Lyrics	Music	Artist	Length
1.	"When Will I See You" (언제쯤 보일까)	Seo Dong-sung	Park Sung-il	Yang Da-il	04:12
2.	"When Will I See You" (Inst.)		Park Sung-il		04:12
Total length:					08:24

=== Part 6 ===
Released on November 14, 2018
No.	Title	Lyrics	Music	Artist	Length
1.	"My Sun" (나의 태양)	Minos, Lee Chi-hoon	Park Sung-il	Minos, Savina & Drones	03:56
2.	"My Sun" (Inst.)		Park Sung-il		03:56
Total length:					07:52

== Ratings ==
My Secret Terrius : South Korea viewers per episode (millions)

Episodes	Episode number															
Episodes	1	2	3	4	5	6	7	8	9	10	11	12	13	14	15	16
Ep.1-16	1.188	1.408	1.098	1.118	1.244	1.795	1.365	1.793	1.300	1.732	1.384	1.690	1.264	1.704	1.431	1.765
Ep.17-32	1.503	1.849	1.513	1.873	1.333	1.696	1.537	1.899	1.334	1.613	1.653	1.815	1.579	1.805	1.838	2.011

Source: Audience measurement performed nationwide by Nielsen Media Research.

Ep.	Original broadcast date	Average audience share		
Ep.	Original broadcast date	TNmS	AGB Nielsen	
Ep.	Original broadcast date	Nationwide	Nationwide	Seoul
1	September 27, 2018	6.8%	6.3% (18th)	7.5% (11th)
2	September 27, 2018	8.4%	7.6% (8th)	8.7% (6th)
3	September 27, 2018	6.3%	6.1% (20th)	7.4% (12th)
4	September 27, 2018	5.8%	6.1% (20th)	7.2% (13th)
5	October 3, 2018	6.6%	6.7% (17th)	7.7% (10th)
6	October 3, 2018	8.4%	9.1% (4th)	10.2% (4th)
7	October 4, 2018	7.4%	7.2% (12th)	7.9% (10th)
8	October 4, 2018	9.3%	9.5% (5th)	10.6% (3rd)
9	October 10, 2018	7.3%	6.9% (15th)	7.6% (9th)
10	October 10, 2018	9.3%	9.4% (5th)	10.6% (3rd)
11	October 11, 2018	7.4%	7.4% (12th)	8.2% (9th)
12	October 11, 2018	9.1%	8.8% (7th)	9.9% (4th)
13	October 17, 2018	7.7%	7.1% (11th)	7.7% (9th)
14	October 17, 2018	9.2%	9.5% (5th)	9.8% (4th)
15	October 18, 2018	8.2%	7.9% (13th)	8.8% (8th)
16	October 18, 2018	9.3%	9.5% (6th)	10.7% (5th)
17	October 24, 2018	8.0%	8.2% (8th)	8.5% (8th)
18	October 24, 2018	9.8%	10.0% (5th)	10.6% (4th)
19	October 25, 2018	7.9%	7.9% (10th)	8.2% (8th)
20	October 25, 2018	9.2%	9.7% (6th)	10.2% (5th)
21	October 31, 2018	7.8%	7.9% (12th)	8.4% (9th)
22	October 31, 2018	9.3%	9.7% (5th)	10.1% (3rd)
23	November 1, 2018	8.8%	8.5% (11th)	9.0% (10th)
24	November 1, 2018	10.8%	10.3% (6th)	10.8% (4th)
25	November 7, 2018	7.6%	7.2% (11th)	7.5% (12th)
26	November 7, 2018	9.1%	9.0% (7th)	9.7% (5th)
27	November 8, 2018	—N/a	8.6% (12th)	8.9% (11th)
28	November 8, 2018	10.4%	9.8% (7th)	10.4% (4th)
29	November 14, 2018	8.8%	8.7% (9th)	9.7% (6th)
30	November 14, 2018	10.5%	10.1% (6th)	11.1% (4th)
31	November 15, 2018	9.5%	9.8% (7th)	10.5% (6th)
32	November 15, 2018	10.6%	10.5% (5th)	11.0% (5th)
Average		—	8.55%	9.22%

== Awards and nominations ==
Year	Award	Category	Nominee	Result	Ref.
2018	2018 MBC Drama Awards	Daesang (Grand Prize)	So Ji-sub	Won	
2018	2018 MBC Drama Awards	Drama of the Year	My Secret Terrius	Won	
2018	2018 MBC Drama Awards	Writer of the Year	Oh Ji-young	Won	
2018	2018 MBC Drama Awards	Top Excellence Award, Actor in a Wednesday-Thursday Drama	So Ji-sub	Won	
2018	2018 MBC Drama Awards	Excellence Award, Actor in a Wednesday-Thursday Miniseries	Son Ho-jun	Nominated	
2018	2018 MBC Drama Awards	Excellence Award, Actress in a Wednesday-Thursday Drama	Jung In-sun	Won	
2018	2018 MBC Drama Awards	Excellence Award, Actress in a Wednesday-Thursday Drama	Im Se-mi	Nominated	
2018	2018 MBC Drama Awards	Best Supporting Actor/Actress in a Wednesday-Thursday Drama	Kang Ki-young	Won	
2018	2018 MBC Drama Awards	Best Child Actor	Kim Gun-woo	Won	
2018	2018 MBC Drama Awards	Best Child Actress	Ok Ye-rin	Won	
2018	2018 MBC Drama Awards	Bromance Award	So Ji-sub, Son Ho-jun and Kang Ki-young	Won	
