= Sweet Night =

2020 single by V

Single by V

from the album Itaewon Class OST
- Released: March 13, 2020
- Genre: Indie pop
- Length: 3:34
- Label: Vlending Co., Ltd.
- Songwriters: Hiss noise; V; Adora; Michel "Lindgren" Schulz
- Producers: Hiss noise; V

V singles chronology
"It's Definitely You" (2016)	"Sweet Night" (2020)	"Christmas Tree" (2021)

Music video
- Sweet Night on YouTube

"Sweet Night" is a song recorded by South Korean singer V of BTS as the soundtrack of the 2020 South Korean television series Itaewon Class. It was released for digital download and streaming on March 13, 2020, by Vlending Company.

== Commercial performance ==
"Sweet Night" debuted at number 39 on South Korea's Gaon Digital Chart in the chart issue dated March 8–14, 2020. In the following week, it ascended to number 14 on the Gaon Digital Chart.

== Charts ==
Weekly chart performance for "Sweet Night"
Chart (2020)	Peak position
Hungary (MAHASZ)	1
New Zealand Hot Singles (RMNZ)	34
South Korea (Gaon)	14
South Korea (K-pop Hot 100)	19
US Digital Songs Sales (Billboard)	2

== Release history ==
Release history for "Sweet Night"
Region	Date	Format	Label
Various	March 13, 2020	Digital download; streaming	Vlending Company
