= Itaewon Class =

2020 South Korean television series

- Promotional poster
- Hangul: 이태원 클라쓰
- Hanja: 梨泰院 클라쓰
- RR: Itaewon keullasseu
- MR: It'aewŏn k'ŭllassŭ
- Genre: Romantic drama Comedy
- Based on: Itaewon Class by Gwang Jin
- Developed by: Kim Do-soo for Showbox
- Written by: Gwang Jin
- Directed by: Kim Seong-yoon
- Starring: Park Seo-joon; Kim Da-mi; Yoo Jae-myung; Kwon Nara
- Music by: Kim Joon-seok (Movie Closer); Park Seung-il (Studio Curiosity)
- Country of origin: South Korea
- Original language: Korean
- No. of episodes: 16

Production
- Executive producer: Jo Joon-hyung
- Producers: Lee Sang-yoon; Jung Soo-jin; Han Suk-won
- Camera setup: Single-camera
- Running time: 70 minutes
- Production companies: Showbox; Zium Content (Note: Acquired by JTBC Studios in 2020); Itaewon Class Production Partners

Original release
- Network: JTBC
- Release: January 31 – March 21, 2020

Related
- Roppongi Class (TV Asahi, 2022)

Itaewon Class (Korean: 이태원 클라쓰) is a 2020 South Korean television series starring Park Seo-joon, Kim Da-mi, Yoo Jae-myung, and Kwon Nara. Based on the webtoon of the same name, it is the first series to be produced by the film distribution company Showbox. It aired on JTBC in Korea from January 31 to March 21, 2020, and is streaming worldwide on Netflix.

The series won Best Drama Series at the 25th Asian Television Awards.

== Synopsis ==
Due to an accident which killed his father, Park Sae-ro-yi (Park Seo-joon) attempted to kill Jang Geun-won (Ahn Bo-hyun), the son of Jangga Group's founder, Jang Dae-hee (Yoo Jae-myung). He was jailed and the woman he loved, Oh Soo-ah (Kwon Na-ra), was offered a university scholarship by Jang Dae-hee and later became the Strategic Planning Head of Jangga Group.

After his release from prison, Park Sae-ro-yi opens DanBam in Itaewon. He wants to be successful and seeks revenge towards Jangga Group. However, he is not too smart at managing his business. He then meets Jo Yi-seo (Kim Da-mi).

== Cast ==
=== Main ===
- Park Seo-joon as Park Sae-ro-yi

Proprietor of DanBam, a bar-restaurant in Itaewon. In his youth, Sae-ro-yi gets expelled from high school for punching CEO Jang's son Geun-won, who was bullying a classmate, and becomes bereaved when his father is killed by Geun-won's reckless driving. Angered by the loss, he attacks Geun-won, leading to his three-year imprisonment. Following his father's steps, Sae-ro-yi opens his bar-restaurant DanBam in Itaewon seven years after he is released from jail, with the aim of expanding it into a franchise and defeating CEO Jang's food company Jangga Group. In 2020, he becomes the CEO of his company IC Group.

- Kim Da-mi as Jo Yi-seo
  - Choi Myung-bin as young Yi-seo

Manager of Sae-ro-yi's bar-restaurant DanBam. Yi-seo is a multi-talented and intelligent girl with an IQ of 162. She moved from New York to continue her studies in South Korea. She is also famous on social media as a power blogger and social media internet celebrity. Having a crush on Sae-ro-yi, she offers to become the manager of DanBam. Her lack of empathy and callous behavior has many people believe she is a sociopath, but she does end up caring for her DanBam coworkers. She especially has a breakthrough with Hyeon-yi after initially criticizing her cooking and believing her transgender identity would impede DanBam's business. Despite being declined by Sae-ro-yi, Yi-seo remains by his side as DanBam's manager. In 2020, Yi-seo becomes the CFO of Sae-ro-yi's company IC Group. Eventually, Sae-ro-yi realizes his feelings for Yi-seo and he confesses his love for her.

- Yoo Jae-myung as Jang Dae-hee
  - Choi Min-young as young Dae-hee

CEO of food company Jangga Group. CEO Jang is a self-made man who, despite the odds, succeeds in turning his once small bar into a large franchise company. In his years of experience leading Jangga, he develops a strong belief in power and authority as a means to achieve his goals. He meets Sae-ro-yi when the latter has a fight with his son Geun-won in high school and expects him to kneel as a submission of his power. However, Sae-ro-yi always resisted kneeling and made his life harder for it. In 2020, he is diagnosed with pancreatic cancer and doesn't have much long to live. Unfortunately, his illegal activities under Jangga was exposed and ruined his company. Despite kneeling before Sae-ro-yi for help, Sae-ro-yi absorbed Jangga into his company, leaving Dae-hee with nothing.

- Kwon Nara as Oh Soo-ah
  - Ok Ye-rin as young Soo-ah

Head of the strategic planning team in Jangga Group; Sae-ro-yi's former classmate and first love. Abandoned by her mother, Soo-ah grew up in an orphanage and became close with Sae-ro-yi's father Sung-yeol. She becomes acquainted with Sae-ro-yi, who has a crush on her. After Sung-yeol's death, she receives a scholarship offer from Jangga Group and soon becomes an employee in the company. Though passionate about her work, she is torn between her allegiance to Jangga and her love for Sae-ro-yi. Due to their conflicts of interests, the two would hold a long term emotional relationship, but never a true romantic one. Eventually, Soo-ah realizes Sae-ro-yi's feelings have changed and the two remain as friends. She later became a whistle blower to the authorities on the crimes that Jangga have committed in the past during her time in the company and later starts her own restaurant.

=== Supporting ===
==== DanBam staff ====
- Kim Dong-hee as Jang Geun-soo
  - CEO Jang's second and illegitimate son; Yi-seo's classmate and staff member at DanBam. Geun-soo has been bullied by his older brother Geun-won and he never felt loved by his parents. Upon turning 17, he left the Jang family and lived by himself from then on. After inconveniencing DanBam in an incident, he decides to work for Sae-ro-yi, whom he considers to be a "real adult". He has a crush on Yi-seo. However, after leaving DanBam, Geun-soo chooses to work at his father's company to become the successor for Jangga Group, and gradually became ruthless towards his former DanBam colleagues due to his thirst to prove himself and win Yi-seo's affections. In 2020, Geun-soo is the director of Jangga Group, and he eventually reconciles with the DanBam staff after realising the error of his ways.
- Ryu Kyung-soo as Choi Seung-kwon
  - Staff member at DanBam. Seung-kwon was Sae-ro-yi's cellmate in prison. Believing that he cannot better his life outside of jail, he became a gangster under a gang leader upon his release. Seven years later, he meets Sae-ro-yi who, to his surprise, had already opened a bar in Itaewon. Deeply respecting Sae-ro-yi and his way to live a better life, he gives up being a gangster and starts working at DanBam. In 2020, he becomes one of the directors of Sae-ro-yi's company IC Group.
- Lee Joo-young as Ma Hyun-yi
  - DanBam's chief cook. Hyun-yi first met Sae-ro-yi in a factory where the two formerly worked, years before the start of DanBam. She was hired as DanBam's cook when Sae-ro-yi liked the food she once cooked for him back then. Hyun-yi is a transgender woman and has been saving money for her sex reassignment surgery. In 2020, she becomes one of the directors of Sae-ro-yi's company IC Group.
- Chris Lyon as Kim To-ni
  - DamBam's Guinean-Korean part-timer. Even though he cannot speak and understand English, To-ni is fluent in speaking Korean, owing to his Korean father and his one-year residence in South Korea, and French, the language he speaks in Guinea. Eventually, he is able to learn and speak a satisfactory amount of English. He also reunited with his Korean grandmother (a sponsor and investor of DanBam), who acknowledges him as her grandchild.

==== Jangga Group ====
- Ahn Bo-hyun as Jang Geun-won
  - CEO Jang's first son and heir to Jangga Group. Geun-won was Sae-ro-yi and Soo-ah's classmate in high school who frequently bullied their classmate Ho-jin. He caused the vehicular accident that killed Sae-ro-yi's father Sung-yeol. Years later when he attempts to recruit Yi-seo into Jangga, his confession to the crime is recorded by her and he attacks her until Sae-ro-yi intervenes and gets him arrested. Dae-hee deserts Geun-won by admitting his son's crimes during his apology meeting and Geun-won was sentenced to seven years' imprisonment. In 2020, he is released on parole after serving four years out of his prison term and therefore, alongside Kim Hee-hoon and his gang, Geun-won plans to get revenge on Yi-seo by kidnapping both her and his brother, though he ultimately failed and he was sentenced to incarceration once again.
- Kim Hye-eun as Kang Min-jung
  - Jangga Group's executive director, who secretly plots to usurp CEO Jang. She is a close friend of Park Sung-yeol, father of Park Sae-ro-yi, which made her willing to ally with Sae-ro-yi against Dae-hee.
- Hong Seo-joon as Mr. Kim
  - Jang Dae-hee's right-hand man. He is very loyal to his boss.
- Yoo Da-mi as Kim Sun-ae
  - Jang Dae-hee's secretary and Kang Min-jung's spy.

==== Others ====
- Lee David as Lee Ho-jin

Sae-royi's investment manager. Ho-jin was Sae-ro-yi, Soo-ah and Geun-won's classmate in high school. After years of bearing the constant bullying from Geun-won, he gets into a prestigious college and takes up business administration. He partners up with Sae-ro-yi in taking revenge against Geun-won and CEO Jang. In 2020, he becomes the financial manager for Sae-ro-yi's company IC Group. In one of the flashback scene when he visited Sae-ro-yi in prison; he listed Sae-ro-yi as a friend.

- Kim Yeo-jin as Jo Jeong-min

Yi-seo's mother, who disapproves of Yi-seo quitting college and working at DanBam. She also did not have a good impression of Sae-ro-yi at first but eventually consents to her daughter's relationship with him.

- Yoon Kyung-ho as Oh Byeong-heon

Detective in charge of Geun-won's hit-and-run case which he was pressured to cover up. He quit his job after the case and is now one of Sae-ro-yi's suppliers.

- Choi Yu-ri as Oh Hye-won

Oh Byeong-heon's daughter, who is oblivious to Sae-ro-yi's connection with her father.

- Cha Mi-kyung as Kim Soon-rye

To-ni's Korean paternal grandmother. After her son's death, she deeply regrets disapproving of her son's marriage to a Guinean woman (To-ni's mother), as it caused her son to run away. She is a loan shark who offers her services to Sae-ro-yi when he moves his bar to a new location. She was also one of the first supporters of Jangga.

- Won Hyun-joon as Kim Hee-hoon

Sae-ro-yi's former cellmate and a leader of a group of gangsters. Though initially cordial to both Sae-ro-yi and Choi Seung-kwon, he later allies himself with Jang Geun-won to kidnap Yi-seo and Geun-soo.

- Han Hye-ji as Kook Bok-hee

Yi-seo and Geun-soo's former classmate. Her bullying activities were exposed after Yi-seo recorded her performing the act, which publicly humiliated her. After running into Yi-seo months later, she attempted to assault her for ruining her reputation alongside her friends, only to be beaten down by Yi-seo.

=== Special appearances ===
- Ahn Sol-bin as Sae-ro-yi's classmate (Ep. 1)

A student who had a crush on Sae-ro-yi and had her confession rejected by him.

- Son Hyun-joo as Park Sung-yeol (Ep. 1–2 & 15)

Sae-ro-yi's father and former employee in Jangga Group. He taught Sae-ro-yi to stick to his beliefs and to fight for what is right. He resigned from Jangga in defense of Sae-ro-yi's deed of stopping Geun-won's bullying. He died in an accident caused by Geun-won.

- Hong Seok-cheon as himself (Ep. 2, 4, 9 & 16)

Soo-ah's acquaintance and TV celebrity. He works at a bar that Sae-ro-yi visits twice (years before and after opening DanBam). They meet again after Sae-ro-yi moves the location of his bar.

- Yoon Park as Kim Sung-hyun (Ep. 3)

Geun-soo's elder friend who goes to DanBam with Geun-soo and Yi-seo where the two get caught for underage drinking.

- Cha Chung-hwa as Bureau Chief's wife (Ep. 3)

Mother of Bok-hee, whose behavior was exposed online by Yi-seo.

- Im So-eun as Bok-hee's friend (Ep. 5)

One of Bok-hee's friends. She, alongside Bok-hee and her friend, attempted to assault Yi-seo after running into each other months after high school graduation.

- Jung Yoo-min as Seo Jeong-in (Ep. 6)

The daughter of the CEO of a pharmaceutical company and Geun-won's blind date. The blind date was arranged by Geun-won's father.

- Seo Eun-soo as part-time job applicant (Ep. 6)

Sae-ro-yi's acquaintance. She applied for the job that was eventually offered to Kim To-ni. Yi-seo rejected her application out of jealousy of her and Sae-ro-yi's close relationship.

- Kim Il-joong as himself (Ep. 11 & 13)

Host of the cooking program show The Best Pub.

- Jeon No-min as Do Joong-myung (Ep. 11–12)

CEO of the investment firm Jungmyung Holdings. He offers Sae-ro-yi to franchise DanBam. Later he was one of the sleeper agent for Dae-hee to thwart Sae-ro-yi plan to franchise DanBam.

- Lee Jun-hyeok as Park Joon-gi (Ep. 11–13)

A contestant on The Best Pub. He represents Jangga Group as the head cook and comes in second to Hyun-yi during the final. He subsequently gets fired.

- Park Bo-gum as Handsome Chef (Ep. 16)

The new chef at Soo-ah's restaurant in which Hong Seok-cheon invested after he passed the job interview.

== Production ==
The first script reading took place in August 2019 at JTBC Building in Sangam-dong, Seoul, South Korea.

Park Seo-joon and Yoo Jae-myung had previously worked together in the KBS2 drama's Hwarang: The Poet Warrior Youth.

== Original soundtrack ==
Itaewon Class: Original Soundtrack

Soundtrack album by Various Artists
- Released: March 20, 2020
- Genre: Soundtrack
- Length: 4:02:10
- Languages: Korean; English
- Labels: Vlending Co., Ltd.

=== Itaewon Class: Original Soundtrack ===
The drama's soundtrack is compiled in a four-part album released on March 20, 2020. CDs 1 and 2 contain the drama's theme songs and their instrumental versions, while CDs 3 and 4 contain the drama's musical score. The following lists are the track listings for the online streaming version of the album.

CD 1
No.	Title	Lyrics	Music	Artist	Length
1.	"You Make Me Back"	Oh Hyun-joo; Kim Jin-hoon	Kim Jin-hoon	Woosung (The Rose)	3:15
2.	"Start Over" (시작 (Note: Lit. "Start"))	Seo Dong-sung	Park Sung-il	Gaho	3:20
3.	"Still Fighting It"	Ben Folds	Ben Folds	Lee Chan-sol	5:20
4.	"Our Souls at Night" (우리의 밤 (Note: Lit. "Our Night"))	Lee Chi-hoon	Park Sung-il	Sondia	4:44
5.	"No Break" (직진 (Note: Lit. "Straight"))	Lee Chi-hoon	Park Sung-il	The Vane	2:53
6.	"Someday, The Boy" (그때 그 아인)	Seo Dong-sung	Park Sung-il	Kim Feel	4:48
7.	"Maybe"	Sondia; Miriam	Park Sung-il	Sondia	3:48
8.	"You Make Me Back" (Inst.)		Kim Jin-hoon		3:15
9.	"Start Over" (Inst.)		Park Sung-il		3:20
10.	"Still Fighting It" (Inst.)		Ben Folds		5:20
11.	"Our Souls at Night" (Inst.)		Park Sung-il		4:44
12.	"No Break" (Inst.)		Park Sung-il		2:53
13.	"Someday, The Boy" (Inst.)		Park Sung-il		4:48
Total length:					52:28

CD 2 (Note: The song "Start Over" by Chris Lyon, who played the character Kim To-ni in the drama, is included in the physical CD album version as the 8th track. All succeeding tracks are renumbered accordingly. CD 2 (CD version): No. / Title / Lyrics / Music / Artist / Length; 8. / "Start Over" / Damon / Park Sung-il / Chris Lyon)
No.	Title	Lyrics	Music	Artist	Length
1.	"Diamond" (돌덩이 (Note: Lit. "Stone Block"))	Gwang Jin; Lee Chi-hoon	Park Sung-il	Ha Hyun-woo (Guckkasten)	3:29
2.	"Sweet Night"	Hiss noise; V (BTS); Adora; Michel "Lindgren" Schulz	Hiss noise; V (BTS); Adora; Michel "Lindgren" Schulz	V (BTS)	3:34
3.	"Say"	Seo Dong-sung; Lee Chi-hoon	Park Sung-il	Yoon Mi-rae	4:20
4.	"Are We Just Friends?" (우린 친구뿐일까)	Seo Dong-sung	Park Sung-il	Sondia	3:48
5.	"No Words" (어떤 말도)	Kwon Young-chan	Hong So-jin	Crush	4:31
6.	"With Us"	Taibian	Taibian; Baaq; CHKmate	Verivery	4:17
7.	"Brand New Way"	Damon	Park Sung-il	Damon	2:52
8.	"Diamond" (Inst.)		Park Sung-il		3:29
9.	"Sweet Night" (Inst.)		Hiss noise; V (BTS); Adora; Michel "Lindgren" Schulz		3:34
10.	"Say" (Inst.)		Park Sung-il		4:20
11.	"Are We Just Friends?" (Inst.)		Park Sung-il		3:48
12.	"No Words" (Inst.)		Hong So-jin		4:31
13.	"With Us" (Inst.)		Taibian; Baaq; CHKmate		4:17
Total length:					50:50

CD 3
No.	Title	Artist	Length
1.	"Itaewon Class" (이태원 클라쓰)	Kim Joon-suk	3:54
2.	"I Wanted to be a Policeman" (제 꿈은 경찰이었습니다)	Noh Yoo-rim	3:07
3.	"I Have a 15-Year Plan, Brace Yourself" (내 계획은 15년 짜리니까 기대해라)	Goo Bon-choon	3:42
4.	"DanBam Kitchen" (단밤 주방)	Kim Jung-wan	3:12
5.	"IQ 162, City Girl" (IQ162 도시여자)	Kim Hyun-do	2:43
6.	"That's My Goal" (그게 내 목표야)	Shim Hee-jin	1:55
7.	"Sociopath" (소시오패스)	Goo Bon-choon	1:51
8.	"The Story" (사연)	Noh Yoo-rim	3:05
9.	"I'm Always Grateful" (난 늘 고마운 마음뿐이야)	Jung Hye-bin	3:05
10.	"A New Morning" (새로운 아침)	Kim Tae-jin	2:11
11.	"My Bittersweet Night" (쓰린 밤이... 내 삶이 달달했으면)	Park Hye-min	1:57
12.	"Crush" (짝사랑)	Shim Hee-jin	2:42
13.	"Operation" (도모)	Kim Joon-suk	3:29
14.	"You think you can act like a jock only because you're the son of a billionaire?" (재벌 2세면 양아치 짓 해도 되는 거냐?)	Son Sung-rak	2:14
15.	"Tragedy of Success" (성공이라는 비극)	Kim Hyun-do	3:37
16.	"The Winner Takes It All" (약육강식)	Noh Yoo-rim	2:58
17.	"I Am The Powerful Ruler" (나는 권위적인 사람이야)	Son Sung-rak	2:08
18.	"The Beginning of Revenge" (복수의 시작)	Shim Hee-jin	3:05
19.	"You Can't Do This to Me" (넌 나한테 이러면 안 돼)	Goo Bon-choon	2:31
20.	"Unforgettable Past" (잊을 수 없는 과거)	Kim Hyun-do	2:13
21.	"Don't Feel Sorry When Eating Pork or Chicken" (돼지나 닭을 먹을 때 미안한 마음은 갖지 마라)	Shin Yoo-jin	2:32
22.	"I Will be Stronger" (저는 더욱더 강해지겠습니다)	Kim Joon-suk	2:34
23.	"False Tears" (거짓 눈물)	Shin Yoo-jin	2:35
24.	"It's All For Jangga Co.'s Sake" (모든 건 장家를 위해서)	Goo Bon-choon	3:10
25.	"A Hit-And-Run" (뺑소니 사건)	Son Sung-rak	2:17
Total length:			1:08:47

CD 4
No.	Title	Artist	Length
1.	"Defence"	Studio Curiosity; Park Sung-il; Fraktal	1:22
2.	"Impressive Day" (인상적인 하루)	Studio Curiosity; Judah Earl	3:00
3.	"His Night" (이 남자의 밤)	Studio Curiosity; Judah Earl	2:50
4.	"A Word of Love" (사랑한단 말)	Studio Curiosity; Park Sung-il	3:48
5.	"You Are Always Shining Too Bright To Me" (넌 나한테 항상 지나치게 빛나)	Studio Curiosity; Judah Earl	3:13
6.	"I'm Going To Crush You All" (내가 다 부숴버릴 거야)	Studio Curiosity; Judah Earl	3:04
7.	"It's Still Bitter" (아직 씁니다)	Studio Curiosity; Park Sung-il	4:26
8.	"I Don't Mind That You Don't Feel The Same Way" (보답받지 못하는 마음이라도)	Studio Curiosity; Judah Earl	2:52
9.	"It's Funny I'm Feeling This Way At My Age" (이 나이에 이런 감정)	Studio Curiosity; Judah Earl	2:48
10.	"IC Inc." (주식회사 IC)	Studio Curiosity; Judah Earl	2:59
11.	"Truth Game" (진실게임)	Studio Curiosity; Judah Earl	3:15
12.	"I Look Forward To It, Partner" (잘 부탁한다, 파트너)	Studio Curiosity; Judah Earl	2:39
13.	"I've Changed Quite a Lot" (난 꽤나 많이 변했어)	Studio Curiosity; Judah Earl	2:48
14.	"I Don't Have To Convince Others About Who I Am" (내가 나인 것에 다른 사람의 납득은 필요 없다)	Studio Curiosity; Judah Earl	3:31
15.	"You Have No Idea How Proud I Was" (얼마나 자랑스러운 아들이냐)	Studio Curiosity; Judah Earl	2:40
16.	"All You Need Is One Word" (그냥 말 한마디면 돼요)	Studio Curiosity; Park Sung-il	2:02
17.	"How Does It Taste?" (술맛이 어떠냐?)	Studio Curiosity; Park Sung-il	2:20
18.	"Still We Are" (여전히 우린)	Studio Curiosity; Park Sung-il	2:12
19.	"We Can Do It" (우리는 된다)	Studio Curiosity; Judah Earl	2:59
20.	"Fresh Start" (새로운 시작)	Studio Curiosity; Judah Earl	2:44
21.	"I Want To Know More About You" (난 니가 궁금해)	Studio Curiosity; Fraktal	1:53
22.	"So why can't the earth just explode so this can all end?" (차라리 지구가 터져버렸으면 좋겠다)	Studio Curiosity; Fraktal	2:11
23.	"Because I'm Korean" (저 한국 사람인데요)	Studio Curiosity; Fraktal	1:35
24.	"An Unreasonable World" (불합리한 세상)	Studio Curiosity; Park Sung-il	1:21
25.	"All Invested In Jangga" (전부 장가에 투자해)	Shin Yoo-jin	2:59
26.	"Tenacity, Bravado" (고집, 객기)	Shim Hee-jin	2:34
Total length:			1:10:05

Itaewon Class: Original Soundtrack Parts 1–13

=== Part 1 ===
Released on January 31, 2020
No.	Title	Lyrics	Music	Artist	Length
1.	"Still Fighting It"	Ben Folds	Ben Folds	Lee Chan-sol	5:20
2.	"Still Fighting It" (Inst.)		Ben Folds		5:20
Total length:					10:40

=== Part 2 ===
Released on February 1, 2020
No.	Title	Lyrics	Music	Artist	Length
1.	"Start Over" (시작)	Seo Dong-sung	Park Sung-il	Gaho	3:20
2.	"Start Over" (Inst.)		Park Sung-il		3:20
Total length:					6:40

=== Part 3 ===
Released on February 7, 2020
No.	Title	Lyrics	Music	Artist	Length
1.	"Diamond" (돌덩이)	Gwang Jin; Lee Chi-hoon	Park Sung-il	Ha Hyun-woo (Guckkasten)	3:29
2.	"Diamond" (Inst.)		Park Sung-il		3:29
Total length:					6:58

=== Part 4 ===
Released on February 8, 2020
No.	Title	Lyrics	Music	Artist	Length
1.	"Our Souls at Night" (우리의 밤)	Lee Chi-hoon	Park Sung-il	Sondia	4:44
2.	"Our Souls at Night" (Inst.)		Park Sung-il		4:44
Total length:					9:28

=== Part 5 ===
Released on February 14, 2020
No.	Title	Lyrics	Music	Artist	Length
1.	"You Make Me Back"	Oh Hyun-joo; Kim Jin-hoon	Kim Jin-hoon	Woosung (The Rose)	3:15
2.	"You Make Me Back" (Inst.)		Kim Jin-hoon		3:15
Total length:					6:30

=== Part 6 ===
Released on February 15, 2020
No.	Title	Lyrics	Music	Artist	Length
1.	"Someday, The Boy" (그때 그 아인)	Seo Dong-sung	Park Sung-il	Kim Feel	4:48
2.	"Someday, The Boy" (Inst.)		Park Sung-il		4:48
Total length:					9:36

=== Part 7 ===
Released on February 21, 2020
No.	Title	Lyrics	Music	Artist	Length
1.	"Are We Just Friends?" (우린 친구뿐일까)	Seo Dong-sung	Park Sung-il	Sondia	3:48
2.	"Maybe"	Sondia; Miriam	Park Sung-il	Sondia	3:48
3.	"Defence"		Park Sung-il; Fraktal		1:22
4.	"Are We Just Friends?" (Inst.)		Park Sung-il		3:48
Total length:					12:46

=== Part 8 ===
Released on February 22, 2020
No.	Title	Lyrics	Music	Artist	Length
1.	"Say"	Seo Dong-sung; Lee Chi-hoon	Park Sung-il	Yoon Mi-rae	4:20
2.	"Say" (Inst.)		Park Sung-il		4:20
Total length:					8:40

=== Part 9 ===
Released on February 29, 2020
No.	Title	Lyrics	Music	Artist	Length
1.	"With Us"	Taibian	Taibian; Baaq; CHKmate	Verivery	4:17
2.	"With Us" (Inst.)		Taibian; Baaq; CHKmate		4:17
Total length:					8:34

=== Part 10 ===
Released on March 6, 2020
No.	Title	Lyrics	Music	Artist	Length
1.	"No Break" (직진)	Lee Chi-hoon	Park Sung-il	The Vane (Note: Performed by band member Chae Bo-hoon)	2:53
2.	"No Break" (Inst.)		Park Sung-il		2:53
Total length:					5:46

=== Part 11 ===
Released on March 7, 2020
No.	Title	Lyrics	Music	Artist	Length
1.	"No Words" (어떤 말도)	Kwon Young-chan	Hong So-jin	Crush	4:31
2.	"No Words" (Inst.)		Hong So-jin		4:31
Total length:					9:02

=== Part 12 ===
Released on March 13, 2020
No.	Title	Lyrics	Music	Artist	Length
1.	"Sweet Night"	Hiss noise; V (BTS); ADORA; Michel "Lindgren" Schulz	Hiss noise; V (BTS); ADORA; Michel "Lindgren" Schulz	V (BTS)	3:34
2.	"Sweet Night" (Inst.)		Hiss noise; V (BTS); ADORA; Michel "Lindgren" Schulz		3:34
Total length:					7:08

=== Part 13 ===
Released on March 14, 2020
No.	Title	Lyrics	Music	Artist	Length
1.	"Brand New Way"	Damon	Park Sung-il	Damon	2:52
2.	"Brand New Way" (Inst.)		Park Sung-il		2:52
Total length:					5:44

=== Chart performance ===
Title	Year	Peak positions	Remarks	Ref.
Title	Year	KOR	Remarks	Ref.
"Start Over" (시작) (Gaho)	2020	1	Part 2	
"Diamond" (돌덩이) (Ha Hyun-woo (Guckkasten))	2020	4	Part 3	
"Someday, the Boy" (그때 그 아인) (Kim Feel)	2020	3	Part 6	
"Say" (Yoon Mi-rae)	2020	63	Part 8	
"No Words" (어떤 말도) (Crush)	2020	76	Part 11	
"Sweet Night" (V)	2020	14	Part 12	

== Reception ==
Itaewon Class' final episode recorded a 16.548% nationwide audience share, making it the fifth-highest viewership rating in JTBC, and the 14th highest-rated drama in Korean cable television history, just slightly under Love (ft. Marriage and Divorce). The drama was also praised for its realistic portrayal of subjects such as prejudice and discrimination against foreigners, ex-convicts and LGBT people, as well as the portrayal of misbehaviours by chaebols.

Time Magazine included Itaewon Class on its list of "The 10 Best Korean Dramas to Watch on Netflix". Forbes included the series on its list of "The 13 Best Korean Dramas Of 2020". The Guardian mentioned the drama in an article recommending Korean dramas to watch after finishing Squid Game. Google Trends revealed that the series was the #1 most-searched drama/entertainment program of 2020, and the fourth most searched domestic search term of 2020 in South Korea.

=== Viewership ===
Itaewon Class : South Korea viewers per episode (millions)

Season	Episode number																Average
Season	1	2	3	4	5	6	7	8	9	10	11	12	13	14	15	16	Average
1	1.261	1.371	1.977	2.500	2.852	3.085	3.026	3.254	3.612	3.803	3.514	3.530	3.321	3.785	3.841	4.425	3.072

Source: Audience measurement performed nationwide by Nielsen Korea.

Average TV viewership ratings
Ep.	Original broadcast date	Average audience share (Nielsen Korea)	
Ep.	Original broadcast date	Nationwide	Seoul
1	January 31, 2020	4.983%	5.283%
2	February 1, 2020	5.330%	5.634%
3	February 7, 2020	8.013%	8.253%
4	February 8, 2020	9.382%	10.692%
5	February 14, 2020	10.716%	11.986%
6	February 15, 2020	11.608%	12.636%
7	February 21, 2020	12.289%	13.215%
8	February 22, 2020	12.562%	13.990%
9	February 28, 2020	13.965%	14.903%
10	February 29, 2020	14.760%	16.160%
11	March 6, 2020	13.798%	15.496%
12	March 7, 2020	13.398%	14.817%
13	March 13, 2020	13.101%	14.344%
14	March 14, 2020	14.197%	15.568%
15	March 20, 2020	14.661%	16.012%
16	March 21, 2020	16.548%	18.328%
Average		11.832%	12.957%
In the table above, the blue numbers represent the lowest ratings and the red numbers represent the highest ratings.; This drama aired on a cable channel/pay TV which normally has a relatively smaller audience compared to free-to-air TV/public broadcasters (KBS, SBS, MBC and EBS).

== Awards and nominations ==
Year	Award	Category	Recipient	Result	Ref.
2020	56th Baeksang Arts Awards	Best Director (TV)	Kim Seong-yoon	Nominated	
2020	56th Baeksang Arts Awards	Best Actor (TV)	Park Seo-joon	Nominated	
2020	56th Baeksang Arts Awards	Best Supporting Actor (TV)	Yoo Jae-myung	Nominated	
2020	56th Baeksang Arts Awards	Best Supporting Actress (TV)	Kwon Nara	Nominated	
2020	56th Baeksang Arts Awards	Best New Actor (TV)	Ahn Bo-hyun	Nominated	
2020	56th Baeksang Arts Awards	Best New Actress (TV)	Kim Da-mi	Won	
2020	56th Baeksang Arts Awards	Technical Award	Park Sung-il (Music)	Nominated	
2020	4th Soribada Best K-Music Awards	Best Hallyu OST	Gaho ("Start Over")	Won	
2020	15th Seoul International Drama Awards	Best Mini Series - Silver Bird Prize	Itaewon Class	Won	
2020	2020 Mnet Asian Music Awards	Best OST	Gaho ("Start Over")	Won	
2020	2020 Mnet Asian Music Awards	Song of the Year	Gaho ("Start Over")	Nominated	
2021	25th Asian Television Awards	Best Drama Series	Itaewon Class	Won	
2021	7th APAN Star Awards	Grand Prize (Daesang)	Park Seo-joon	Nominated	
2021	7th APAN Star Awards	Drama of the Year	Itaewon Class	Won	
2021	7th APAN Star Awards	Best New Actor	Ahn Bo-hyun	Nominated	
2021	7th APAN Star Awards	Best New Actress	Kim Da-mi	Nominated	
2021	7th APAN Star Awards	Popular Star Award, Actress	Kim Da-mi	Nominated	
2021	7th APAN Star Awards	Popular Star Award, Actor	Park Seo-joon	Nominated	
2021	7th APAN Star Awards	Best OST	V ("Sweet Night")	Won	
2021	30th Seoul Music Awards	OST Award	Gaho ("Start Over")	Nominated	
2021	30th Seoul Music Awards	OST Award	Ha Hyun-woo ("Diamond")	Nominated	
2021	30th Seoul Music Awards	OST Award	Kim Feel ("Someday, The Boy")	Nominated	
2021	Korea Communications Commission Broadcasting Awards	Excellence Award	Itaewon Class	Won	

== International adaptations ==
- A Japanese drama adaptation, titled Roppongi Class, was aired on July 7, 2022 via TV Asahi. The Main cast was Yurina Hirate, Yuko Araki, Ryoma Takeuchi and Teruyuki Kagawa.
- A Taiwanese drama adaptation titled Fired Up! was released via HBO Max on July 31, 2026. The adaptation stars Eric Chou in his drama debut, alongside Angela Yuen, Ivy Shao and Wang Shih-hsien.
- British, Chinese, French, German, Indian, Turkish and Philippine adaptations are in development.

== See also ==
- Young Actors' Retreat (2022)
