= Love Yourself: Tear =

- Digital cover

Studio album by BTS
- Released: May 18, 2018
- Recorded: 2018
- Genres: Hip-hop; alt-R&B; EDM; pop; jazz
- Length: 44:02
- Languages: Korean; English
- Labels: Big Hit; Iriver
- Producer: Pdogg

BTS chronology
| Face Yourself (2018) | Love Yourself: Tear (2018) | Love Yourself: Answer (2018) |

Singles from Love Yourself: Tear
- 1. "Fake Love" Released: May 18, 2018; 2. "Airplane Pt. 2" Released: November 7, 2018

Physical album covers
- (Left to right) Y, O, U, and R version covers

Love Yourself: Tear (stylized as LOVE YOURSELF 轉 'Tear') is the third Korean-language and sixth overall studio album by South Korean boy band BTS. The album was released on May 18, 2018, by Big Hit Entertainment. It is available in four versions and contains eleven tracks, with "Fake Love" as its lead single. The concept album explores themes relating to the pains and sorrows of separation. On May 27, 2018, the album debuted at number one on the US Billboard 200, earning 135,000 album-equivalent units and becoming BTS' highest-charting album in a Western market at the time, as well as the first Korean album to top the US albums chart and the highest-charting album by an Asian act.

== Background and release ==
Love Yourself: Tear was first announced on April 16, 2018, following the release of a nine-minute short film entitled "Euphoria: Theme of Love Yourself 起 Wonder" on April 5. The video included a new song, also named "Euphoria", recorded as a solo by member Jungkook. The song was produced by DJ Swivel, Candace Nicole Sosa, Bang Si-hyuk, Supreme Boi, Melanie Fontana, Adora, and BTS' leader RM, and was complimented for its synth-pop style and tropical house elements. Tear was designed as a follow-up to BTS' 2017 EP Love Yourself: Her, with "Euphoria" serving to connect the two releases.

On May 6, the trailer for the album, featuring a new song entitled "Singularity", was released. The neo-soul solo was performed by member V, and serves as the intro track for the album. "Singularity" was produced by British composer Charlie J. Perry, with lyrics also provided by RM. The trailer was described as having a sensual, dream-like atmosphere, and was praised for its use of symbolism and contrast. Blanca Méndez of Spin called V's performance in the video "rich" and "expressive", describing it as having a "quiet confidence". The song itself was described as having a haunting tune, and containing jazz elements and themes of desperation. Promotional concept photos presenting four different themes were released on May 8, for the "O" and "R" versions, and May 10 for the "Y" and "U" versions. The official track list of eleven songs was released on May 13, revealing a second collaboration with Steve Aoki, as well as a track titled "Airplane pt.2", said to be an extension of J-Hope's song "Airplane" from his mixtape Hope World. The song "Anpanman" is based on the Japanese manga superhero of the same name.

On May 14, the first video teaser for what was revealed to be the first single, "Fake Love", was released via Big Hit's official YouTube channel. The song has been described as "an emo, hip hop genre track with a grunge rock guitar sound & groovy trap beat that creates an odd gloominess", and lyrics that "clearly represent the theme of the album by realizing that a love that was thought to be fated was actually a lie". The Billboard Music Awards released a short, sneak peek clip from the music video on May 15, which showed part of the new choreography and teased a line from the song's chorus, "I'm so sick of this fake love". Big Hit released the second and final video teaser on May 16. On May 18, the album was released, along with the music video for "Fake Love".

== Promotion ==
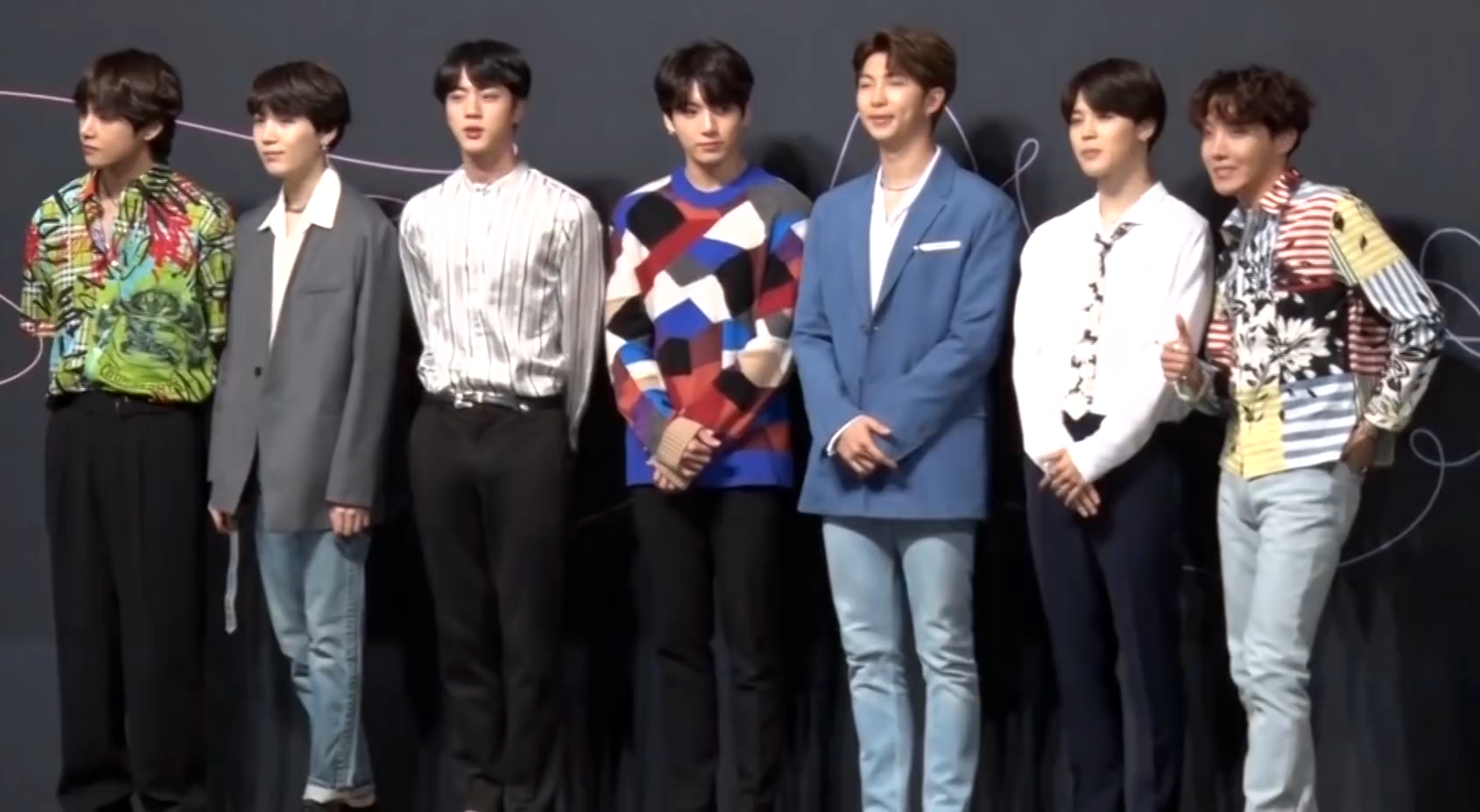
BTS at their press conference for the album on May 24, 2018.

On May 18, 2018, two hours prior to the album's release, a "Comeback Preview Show" was broadcast live from Los Angeles on Naver's V Live broadcasting site featuring BTS discussing the new music. "Fake Love" made its worldwide television debut on May 20, when BTS performed it live at the 2018 Billboard Music Awards. This marked the first time that a Korean music act performed at the award show.

As was previously done for Love Yourself: Her, a special "BTS Comeback Show", hosted by Mnet, was broadcast live worldwide on May 24, featuring performances of "Fake Love" and several B-side songs from the album. The group revealed behind the scenes images of comeback preparations and presented a special video specifically for their fans. The show was broadcast simultaneously online via Mnet Japan, YouTube, Facebook and Joox. BTS also performed "Fake Love" on The Ellen DeGeneres Show on May 25, marking their second appearance on the program.

The group also held a press conference at the Lotte Hotel in Jung-gu, Seoul, on May 24, 2018, to promote the album. During the following two weeks, BTS performed the songs "Fake Love", "Airplane pt. 2", and "Anpanman" on various South Korean music shows, including Music Bank, Show! Music Core, Inkigayo, Show Champion, and M Countdown.

== Composition ==
In an interview with Billboard some of the producers that helped with the album recalled their thought processes and aims for the album. For the intro "Singularity", Charlie J. Perry recalled that the song started out as a poem and it was built up from there. They wanted it to have a Daniel Caesar/D'Angelo type of vibe in the realm of neo-soul. For "The Truth Untold", Jake Torrey said they wanted to play with some cooler chords and at one point had the feel of a Sam Smith ballad. The person who helped write "Airplane pt. 2", Ali Tamposi who co-wrote the hit "Havana" by Camila Cabello, stated she wanted the song to have a similar feel to "Havana". In an interview with TV Report in Korea writer MNEK discussed the track "Paradise". It was originally supposed to be called "Mouth" and was about a breakup and having a broken heart. The lyrics changed a bit after sending it to BTS.

"Anpanman" is based on the Japanese hero Anpanman who is the world's weakest hero and made out of red bean bread. The character gives parts of his face to hungry people and in the lyrics BTS compare themselves to him stating they desire to give people hope through their music and performances. "Outro: Tear" begins with a fast rap, the lyrics describing the regretful possibility of the band's disbandment, and “134340” is named after the minor planet designation of the former planet Pluto. It talks about being turned away by a former lover and being seen as something insignificant. "Magic Shop" was created by Jungkook and is a song dedicated to their fans. It showcases catchy beats and electronic drops. "Love Maze" is meant to be an uplifting song that showcases a catchy rap.

== Critical reception ==
Professional ratings
Aggregate scores
| Source | Rating |
|---|---|
| Metacritic | 74/100 |
Review scores
| Source | Rating |
| The 405 | 7/10 |
| AllMusic | 4/5 stars |
| The Guardian | 3/5 stars |
| IZM | 3.5/5 stars |
| Pitchfork | 7.1/10 |
| Rolling Stone | 3.5/5 stars |
| Spin | 8/10 |

According to the review aggregator Metacritic, Love Yourself: Tear received "generally favorable reviews" based on a weighted average score of 74 out of 100 from 6 critic scores. Neil Z. Yeung from AllMusic gave the album four stars out of five stating that "stylish and yearning, Love Yourself: Tear is BTS at a polished and focused peak, cohesive enough to feel like it was conceived in one particular period rather than cobbled together like some of their previous releases". Blanca Méndez of Spin stated that "whereas the first installment of the series seemed uneasy and disjointed in its span of styles, Love Yourself: Tear's genre-hopping sounds like the group is simply having a good time". Sheldon Pearce of Pitchfork wrote that the album "formula is a slick, loosely thematic album about love and loss, with a stronger focus on rapping than ever before" and that "Tear aims for cohesion and produces fun, prismatic songs in the process." Jess Lau of The 405 noted that "Love Yourself: Tear shows off each individual member's qualities fairly and acts as a well-structured introduction to a wider global audience that is all too eager to pick out negatives". Elias Leight from Rolling Stone stated that "BTS' Love Yourself: Tear is K-Pop with genre-hopping panache" and noted that "throughout it all, the members of BTS affect melodic sincerity, singing with intensity and melisma, rapping in tones that show their effort and strain, as if caring never went out of style". Caitlin Kelley from Billboard described the album as "one of their most thematically cohesive yet sonically varied albums, with maximalist production erupting against lyrics about emptiness".

Crystal Tai of the South China Morning Post said, "On Love Yourself: Tear, the band also known as the Bangtan Boys, reveal that they are boys no longer, instead embracing a mature sound that is as dark as it is real". Jeff Benjamin from Fuse TV pointed out that "while the lead-up to the album release saw BTS shifting expectations for Korean-pop acts, the music itself positions them away from any dismissive boy band or pop star labels". Hong Dam-young of The Korea Herald revealed "BTS' focus has always been on connecting with listeners and using its members' own stories as leverage. And the group has not deviated from that in its new album Love Yourself: Tear" describing, "Musically, the fully packed 11-track album is admirable, as it seamlessly shifts between genres ranging from emo hip hop and Latin pop to pop ballads. Unlike the group’s previous socially conscious hip-hop works, Love Yourself: Tear is overtaken by dark tunes and complexed feelings of love" adding that, "The key factor behind the album's explosive success doesn't lie solely on its musical versatility and extravagance, but also in its overarching message: What truly matters is to deliver messages that can truly touch a listener's heart".

Alexis Petridis of The Guardian, however, gave the album a mixed review, writing that "on the plus side, they're very good at ballads, performing them with a breathy intensity that's genuinely affecting and powerful..." but "there is also stuff that you struggle to recall the second it finishes: in one ear and out the other it goes, leaving no recognisable trace. It's not that it's overly saccharine, which is the charge regularly levelled at K-pop; it's just commonplace". Petridis pointed out that "the phenomenon of BTS seems more interesting than the music at its centre, although Love Yourself: Tear is certainly good enough to keep the phenomenon moving smoothly". Crystal Bell of MTV stated 'with Love Yourself: Tear, BTS cemented themselves as one of most vital acts in pop music today", calling the album one of the best of 2018.

In December 2018, art director HuskyFox was nominated in the category Grammy Award for Best Recording Package for his work on Love Yourself: Tear. It is the second time someone of Korean descent received a Grammy nomination after Sumi Jo was nominated for Best Opera Recording in 1992.

Both "Fake Love" and "Singularity" were voted as one of the top 65 Best Songs of 2018 by The New York Times. "Paradise" was ranked the second best K-Pop B-track in 2018 by MTV, and “134340” came in as the 15th best K-pop song of the year on Billboard. Billboard ranked the album on their "Best Albums of 2018 (So Far)" mid-year list.

== Accolades ==
Awards and nominations
| Year | Organization | Award | Result | Ref. |
|---|---|---|---|---|
| 2018 | Melon Music Awards | Album of the Year | Won | |
| 2018 | Mnet Asian Music Awards | Album of the Year | Won | |
| 2018 | Seoul Music Awards | Album Daesang | Won | |
| 2018 | Gaon Chart Music Awards | Album of the Year – 2nd Quarter | Won | |
| 2019 | Grammy Awards | Best Recording Package (for HuskyFox) (Note: This award is to the album and the album designer, HuskyFox, not BTS) | Nominated | |
| 2019 | RTHK International Pop Poll Awards | The Best Selling Korean Album | Won | |

Accolades for Love Yourself: Tear
| Publication | List | Rank | Ref. |
|---|---|---|---|
| City Pages | Every #1 album from 2018, ranked | 21 | |
| Idolator | The 10 Best K-Pop Albums of 2018 | 1 | |
| MTV | Albums of the Year | —N/a | |
| Noisey | The 100 Best Albums of 2018 | 100 | |
| PopCrush | Best Albums of 2018 | —N/a | |
| Refinery29 | The 12 Best K-Pop Albums of 2018 | 1 | |
| Rolling Stone | 20 Best Pop Albums of 2018 | 13 | |
| Young Post | The 20 best albums of 2018 | 4 | |

== Commercial performance ==
Between April 18 and 25, 2018, the first six days of the pre-order period for Love Yourself: Tear, IRIVER reported that the album had sold more than 1.44 million copies domestically, surpassing its predecessor Love Yourself: Her as the most pre-ordered album in Korea, and making BTS the first K-pop group to have two consecutive albums exceed one million pre-orders. On May 24, news media revealed updated numbers showing that pre-orders had actually crossed 1.5 million copies. This record was eventually broken in July 2018 by BTS' own compilation album Love Yourself: Answer, with a difference of about 62,000 copies.

Upon its release in South Korea, Love Yourself: Tear sold 1,664,041 copies in its first two weeks, making it the highest monthly sales for an album since the Gaon Chart's inception. The record was previously held by BTS' own EP Love Yourself: Her, and was eventually surpassed by Love Yourself: Answer in September 2018. The album also sold around 250,000 copies more in its first week than Love Yourself: Her, BTS' previous Korean release. These sales also caused BTS to become the first K-pop artist to surpass one-million copies in its first week on the Hanteo chart since its inception in 1993, making them true "double million sellers" (pure, without repackage). The album was eventually certified "Million" by the Korea Music Content Association in July 2018, becoming the first album to receive this after the Gaon Music Chart launched certifications earlier that year. Of the 20 million albums sold in 2018, Love Yourself: Tear accounted for about 2 million, or 10% of them. In August 2019, the album surpassed 2 million copies in South Korea along with Love Yourself: Her, making BTS' their 2nd "Double Million" certification after Love Yourself: Answer received their milestone in October 2018.

On May 27, 2018, the album debuted at number one on the US Billboard 200, earning 135,000 album-equivalent units (including 100,000 pure album sales), becoming BTS' highest-charting album in the US, as well as the first K-pop album to top the US albums chart, and the highest-charting album by an Asian act. It is also the highest sales week for both BTS and a Korean act in the United States, and the first album primarily in a non-English language to top the Billboard 200 since Il Divo with Ancora in 2006. As of July 2018, according to Nielsen Music's Mid-Year Report, Love Yourself: Tear is the ninth best-selling album of 2018 in the United States, and is the top-selling foreign language album. The album became the band's longest-running entry on the World Albums chart in July 2020, when it re-entered the July 18 chart issue at number 11, marking its hundredth week on the tally. It is the first BTS album to achieve this feat, as well as a first for any Korean language offering in the history of the chart.

In the United Kingdom, Love Yourself: Tear was BTS' highest-charting album, becoming their first top ten on the UK Albums chart, with a peak at number eight. The album later attained Silver in the UK, becoming BTS' third album to be achieve this certification following Love Yourself: Answer and Map of the Soul: Persona.

The album has sold over 100,000 copies since its Japanese release, becoming the first of BTS' Korean-language discography to be certified gold by the Recording Industry Association of Japan in August 2018. Tower Records Japan reported the album was the most imported album in Japan for 2018.

== Track listing ==
Credits adapted from the liner notes of the physical album.

| No. | Title | Writer(s) | Producer(s) | Length |
|---|---|---|---|---|
| 1. | "Intro: Singularity" (performed by V) | Charlie J. Perry; RM | Charlie J. Perry | 3:17 |
| 2. | "Fake Love" | Pdogg; "hitman" bang; RM | Pdogg | 4:02 |
| 3. | "The Truth Untold" (전하지 못한 진심; Jeonhaji mot-han jinsim) (featuring Steve Aoki) (performed by Jin, Jimin, V, and Jungkook) | Steve Aoki; Roland Spreckley; Jake Torrey; Noah Conrad; Annika Wells; RM; Slow Rabbit | Steve Aoki | 4:02 |
| 4. | "134340" | Pdogg; Adora; Bobby Jung; RM; Martin Luke Brown; Orla Gartland; Suga; J-Hope | Pdogg | 3:49 |
| 5. | "Paradise" (낙원; Nagwon) | lophiile; MNEK; RM; Song Jae-kyung; Suga; J-Hope | lophiile | 3:30 |
| 6. | "Love Maze" | Pdogg; DJ Swivel; Candace Nicole Sosa; RM; Suga; J-Hope; Bobby Chung; Adora; Yoon Kita | Pdogg | 3:40 |
| 7. | "Magic Shop" | Jungkook; Hiss noise; RM; DJ Swivel; Candace Nicole Sosa; Adora; J-Hope; Suga | Jungkook; Hiss noise; Adora | 4:36 |
| 8. | "Airplane Pt. 2" | Pdogg; RM; Ali Tamposi; Liza Owens; Roman Campolo; "hitman" bang; Suga; J-Hope | Pdogg | 3:39 |
| 9. | "Anpanman" | Pdogg; Supreme Boi; "hitman" bang; RM; Suga; Jinbo | Pdogg | 3:54 |
| 10. | "So What" | Pdogg; "hitman" bang; Adora; RM; Suga; J-Hope | Pdogg | 4:44 |
| 11. | "Outro: Tear" (performed by RM, Suga, and J-Hope) | Shin Myung-soo; Docskim; Suga; RM; J-Hope | Docskim | 4:45 |
| Total length: | | | | 44:02 |

== Credits and personnel ==
The credits are adapted from the CD liner notes of Love Yourself: Tear

- Executive producer – "hitman" bang
- Executive supervisor – Nine Choi
- Chief director of management – Kim Shin-gyoo
- Artist management team – Song Ho-beom, Lee Seong-seok
- Artist protocol team – Kim Jae-hyeong, Kim Se-jin, Lee Jeong-il, Kim Yoon-jae, Oh Gwang-tak, Lee Joong-min, Kim Soo-bin
- Chief director of business – LENZO YOON
- Contents business team – Bang Yoo-jeong, Kim Soo-rin, Lin Na-yeob, Gil Hyeon-ji, Kim Boon-hong, Lee Ji-eun, Shin Hye-ri, Shin Jae-eun, Kim Ji-hyeon
- Partnership business team – Park Hwi-soon, Kang Kyeong-jin, Oh Yeong-hwan
- Head of concert and global business – DJ KIM
- Concert business team – Park White Flower, Kwon Jin-ah, Lee Lin-hye, Kang Ye-ri, Park Min-seong
- Global business part – Bae Seong-ho, Yoon Ji-seon, Lim Hye-jeong
- Head of communication – Lee Jin-hyeong
- Public relations part – Hong Joo-wong, Oh Min-joo, Lee Seung-ah, Lim Hye-mi
- SNS part – Joy, We Ji-eun
- Chief director of Japan – Myeong-han
- Japan office – LEE HYEOK, Heo Yoon-yeong, Noh Se-hwang, Takano
- Japan business support team – Shin Hyo-jin

== Charts ==
=== Weekly charts ===
Weekly chart performance
| Chart (2018–2022) | Peak position |
|---|---|
| Australian Albums (ARIA) | 6 |
| Austrian Albums (Ö3 Austria) | 5 |
| Belgian Albums (Ultratop Flanders) | 6 |
| Belgian Albums (Ultratop Wallonia) | 18 |
| Canadian Albums (Billboard) | 2 |
| Croatian International Albums (HDU) | 19 |
| Czech Albums (ČNS IFPI) | 16 |
| Dutch Albums (Album Top 100) | 6 |
| Estonian Albums (Eesti Ekspress) | 1 |
| Finnish Albums (Suomen virallinen lista) | 4 |
| French Albums (SNEP) | 45 |
| German Albums (Offizielle Top 100) | 17 |
| Greek Albums (IFPI) | 55 |
| Hungarian Albums (MAHASZ) | 12 |
| Irish Albums (IRMA) | 8 |
| Italian Albums (FIMI) | 34 |
| Japanese Albums (Oricon) | 3 |
| Japan Hot Albums (Billboard) | 1 |
| Mexican Albums (AMPROFON) | 7 |
| New Zealand Albums (RMNZ) | 5 |
| Norwegian Albums (VG-lista) | 2 |
| Polish Albums (ZPAV) | 25 |
| Scottish Albums (Official Charts) | 11 |
| Slovak Albums (ČNS IFPI) | 32 |
| South Korean Albums (Gaon) | 1 |
| Spanish Albums (PROMUSICAE) | 18 |
| Swedish Albums (Sverigetopplistan) | 6 |
| Swiss Albums (Schweizer Hitparade) | 8 |
| UK Albums (Official Charts) | 8 |
| US Billboard 200 | 1 |
| US Independent Albums (Billboard) | 1 |
| US World Albums (Billboard) | 1 |

=== Monthly charts ===
Monthly chart performance
| Chart (2018) | Peak position |
|---|---|
| Japanese Albums (Oricon) | 2 |
| South Korean Albums (Gaon) | 1 |

=== Year-end charts ===
Year-end chart performance
| Chart (2018) | Position |
|---|---|
| Belgian Albums (Ultratop Flanders) | 103 |
| Dutch Albums (MegaCharts) | 83 |
| Estonian Albums (Eesti Ekspress) | 44 |
| Japanese Albums (Oricon) | 18 |
| Mexican Albums (AMPROFON) | 47 |
| South Korean Albums (Gaon) | 2 |
| US Billboard 200 | 101 |
| US Independent Albums (Billboard) | 3 |
| US Top Album Sales (BuzzAngle) | 14 |
| US World Albums (Billboard) | 1 |
| Chart (2019) | Position |
| Hungarian Albums - Rank (MAHASZ) | 26 |
| Hungarian Albums - Sales (MAHASZ) | 58 |
| South Korean Albums (Gaon) | 15 |
| US Independent Albums (Billboard) | 6 |
| US World Albums (Billboard) | 4 |
| Chart (2020) | Position |
| South Korean Albums (Gaon) | 51 |
| Chart (2021) | Position |
| Japanese Albums (Oricon) | 90 |
| South Korean Albums (Gaon) | 28 |
| Chart (2022) | Position |
| South Korean Albums (Circle) | 48 |

== Certifications and sales ==
Certifications and sales
| Region | Certification | Certified units/sales |
|---|---|---|
| Canada (Music Canada) | Platinum | 80,000^{‡} |
| France (SNEP) | Gold | 50,000^{‡} |
| Japan (RIAJ) | Gold | 209,598 |
| New Zealand (RMNZ) | Gold | 7,500^{‡} |
| Poland (ZPAV) | Gold | 10,000^{‡} |
| South Korea (KMCA) | 3× Million | 2,349,588 |
| United Kingdom (BPI) | Gold | 100,000^{‡} |
| United States | — | 212,953 |
^{‡} Sales+streaming figures based on certification alone.

== Release history ==
Release history and formats for Love Yourself: Tear
| Region | Date | Format | Label | Ref(s). |
|---|---|---|---|---|
| South Korea | May 18, 2018 | CD; digital download; streaming | Big Hit; iriver | |
| United States | May 18, 2018 | CD; digital download; streaming | Big Hit; iriver | |
| Japan | May 18, 2018 | CD; digital download; streaming | Big Hit; iriver; Universal | |
| Various | May 18, 2018 | Digital download; streaming | Big Hit | |
| South Korea | January 22, 2024 | Vinyl | Big Hit; Universal | |
| Japan | January 22, 2024 | Vinyl | Big Hit; Universal | |
| United States | February 23, 2024 | Vinyl | Big Hit; Universal | |
| Europe | February 23, 2024 | Vinyl | Big Hit; Universal | |

== See also ==
- List of best-selling albums in South Korea
- List of K-pop songs on the Billboard charts
- List of K-pop albums on the Billboard charts
- List of Gaon Album Chart number ones of 2018
