= Fri(end)s =

2024 single by V

Single by V
- Released: March 15, 2024
- Genre: Pop; Soul; R&B
- Length: 2:28
- Label: Big Hit
- Songwriters: Castle; Connor McDonough; Melanie Fontana; Riley McDonough; Salem Ilese; Michel "Lindgren" Schulz; Ori Rose
- Producers: Connor McDonough; Riley McDonough

V singles chronology
"Wherever U R" (2023)	"Fri(end)s" (2024)	"Winter Ahead" (2024)

Music video
- "Fri(end)s" on YouTube

"Fri(end)s" is a digital single by South Korean singer V of BTS. It was released on March 15, 2024, by Big Hit Music.

== Track listing ==
- Digital download and streaming
1. "Fri(end)s" – 2:28
2. "Fri(end)s" (instrumental) – 2:28
3. "Fri(end)s" (sped up) – 2:03
4. "Fri(end)s" (slowed down) – 2:42

== Credits and personnel ==
- V – vocals
- Connor McDonough – songwriting, production
- Riley McDonough – songwriting, production
- Castle – songwriting
- Melanie Fontana – songwriting
- Salem Ilese – songwriting
- Michel "Lindgren" Schulz – songwriting
- Ori Rose – songwriting

== Charts ==
=== Weekly charts ===
Weekly chart performance
Chart (2024)	Peak position
Brazil Hot 100 (Billboard)	93
Canada Hot 100 (Billboard)	38
Global 200 (Billboard)	5
Hong Kong (Billboard)	6
India International (IMI)	1
Indonesia (Billboard)	8
Japan Hot 100 (Billboard)	38
Japan Combined Singles (Oricon)	28
Malaysia (Billboard)	8
Malaysia International (RIM)	6
MENA (IFPI)	1
New Zealand (RMNZ)	22
North Africa (IFPI)	5
Peru (Billboard)	12
Saudi Arabia (IFPI)	1
Singapore (RIAS)	4
South Korea (Circle)	101
Taiwan (Billboard)	14
UAE (IFPI)	5
UK Singles (OCC)	13
US Billboard Hot 100	65

=== Yearly charts ===
Yearly chart performance for "Fri(end)s"
Chart (2024)	Position
India International (IMI)	20

== Certifications ==
Certifications and sales
Region	Certification	Certified units/sales
New Zealand (RMNZ)	Gold	15,000^{‡}
^{‡} Sales+streaming figures based on certification alone.

== Release history ==
Release dates and formats
Region	Date	Format(s)	Version	Label	Ref.
Various	March 15, 2024	Digital download; streaming	Original; instrumental; sped up; slowed down	Big Hit	
