= Singularity (song) =

2018 song by BTS

Song by BTS

from the album Love Yourself: Tear
- Released: May 7, 2018
- Recorded: 2017–2018
- Studio: Dogg Bounce; Carrot Express
- Genre: R&B, neo soul, jazz
- Length: 3:17
- Label: Big Hit Entertainment
- Songwriters: Charlie J. Perry; RM
- Producers: Charlie J. Perry; RM

Music video
- "'Singularity' Comeback Trailer" on YouTube

"Singularity" is a song by South Korean boy band BTS, sung as a solo by member V. It was released on May 7, 2018, as part of the album Love Yourself: Tear. It was written by Charlie J. Perry and RM, with Charlie J. Perry being the sole producer. The song was released a second time on the compilation album Love Yourself: Answer on August 24, 2018.

== Background and release ==
The music video for "Singularity" was released as a teaser for the then upcoming album Love Yourself: Tear. The video reached over ten million views in less than fifteen hours. According to Dictionary.com, searches for the word also increased 7,558%.

== Promotion ==
The song was promoted at the 2018 KBS Song Festival on December 29, 2018. V has performed Singularity at "KBS Daejun 2018".

== Music video ==
Goldbin and Soohyoun Nam, writing for Mnews, described the setting of the music video as an enclosed space in which member V moves between areas of light and shadow, and, later, a dark room filled with flowers. They interpreted the "restrained" choreography, performed with white masks, as symbolising that he has concealed his true self to attain love, and the images of broken ice as indicating his realisation that he has been acting in a way that isn't genuine. Billboard's Tamar Herman pointed out that he seemed to be acting out the Greek tale of Narcissus, whose love of his own reflection caused his death.

It was revealed that the choreographer who made the dance was Keone Madrid, who has worked with BTS on several other dances such as "Dope", "Fire", "Not Today" and "Blood Sweat & Tears". The director for the music video was Choi Yongseok from Lumpens. The assistant directors were Lee Wonju, Jeong Minje, and Park Hyejeong of Lumpens. Other key personnel were Nam Hyunwoo of GDW who was the director of photography, Song Hyunsuk from Real Lighting who was the gaffer, editor Park Hyejeong, and the art directors Park Jinsil and Kim Bona of MU:E.

The music video surpassed 150 million views on Youtube on November 21, 2020, making it the most viewed intro on the platform and BTS' first comeback trailer to cross the mark.

== Composition ==
Musically, the song has been described as R&B with touches of neo soul and jazz by Rolling Stone India. Burlington County Times described it as "a relaxing beat supplemented by V's honey-like voice", which "gets better with every listen". It is in the key of D♭ minor and is 104 beats per minute.

In an interview with Billboard, writer Charlie J. Perry recalled that the song started out as a poem and it was built up from there. They wanted it to have a Daniel Caesar/D'Angelo type of vibe in the realm of neo-soul. RM wrote the lyrics in 3 hours after being released from surgery, as confirmed by V himself in an interview Rm writer of singularity. According to MTV News, the song is about V "questioning the mask he wears to conceal his true feelings, [asking himself], 'Did I lose myself, or did I gain you?'"

== Reception ==
Overall, the song was received well, with Alexis Pedridis from The Guardian stating the song was "blessed with a particularly haunting tune, [pitching] its sound somewhere between vintage 70's soul and a latter-day R&B slow jam". IZM stated the song added a distinctive neo soul voice to the album and spin.com said V provided a quiet confidence that set the tone to the album. Pitchfork called "Singularity" the album's thesis. In a blog post, journalist Monique Jones described "Singularity" as "pure R&B" and "a song tailor made for Taehyung's voice".

The song was ranked at number thirteen for digital sales in the United States upon release and sold more than 10,000 copies.

== Accolades ==
Year-end lists
Critic/Publication	List	Rank	Ref.
Los Angeles Times	Best of 2018	4	
The New York Times	The 65 Best Songs of 2018	20	
SBS	Top 100 Asian pop songs of 2018	24	

== Credits and personnel ==
The song's credits are adapted from the CD liner notes of Love Yourself: Answer.

- Charlie J. Perry- Producer, Keyboard, Bass
- RM- Producer
- Pdogg- Vocal Arrangement, Recording Engineer @ Dogg Bounce
- Slow Rabbit- Vocal Arrangement, Recording Engineer @ Carrot Express
- ADORA- Digital Editing
- Hiss noise- Digital Editing
- Yang Ga- Mix Engineer @ Big Hit Studio

== Charts ==
Chart (2018)	Peak position
France Download (SNEP)	100
Hungary (Single Top 40)	4
Japan Hot 100 (Billboard Japan)	34
South Korea (Gaon)	54
South Korea (K-pop Hot 100)	10
US World Digital Songs (Billboard)	1

== Release history ==
Country	Date	Format	Version	Label
Various	May 18, 2018	digital download; streaming	Intro version	Big Hit
Various	August 24, 2018	digital download; streaming	Regular version	Big Hit
