= Winter Ahead =

2024 single by V

Single by V and Park Hyo-shin
- Released: November 29, 2024
- Genre: Jazz
- Length: 3:54
- Label: Big Hit
- Songwriters: V; Park Hyo-shin; Jesse Harris; Hyesung; Waizmin
- Producers: Hyesung; Waizmin

V singles chronology
"Fri(end)s" (2024)	"Winter Ahead" (2024)	"White Christmas" (remix) (2024)

Music video
- "Winter Ahead" on YouTube

"Winter Ahead" is a single by South Korean singers V of BTS and Park Hyo-shin. It was released on November 29, 2024, by Big Hit Music.

== Accolades ==
Awards and nominations for "Winter Ahead"
Awards	Category	Result	Ref.
2025 MAMA Awards	Best Collaboration	Nominated	
2025 MAMA Awards	Song of the Year	Longlisted	

== Track listing ==
- CD, digital download and streaming
1. "Winter Ahead" – 3:54
- CD – instrumental
1. "Winter Ahead" (instrumental) – 3:54
- Digital download and streaming – Silent Carol version
1. "Winter Ahead" – 3:54
2. "Winter Ahead" (instrumental) – 3:54
3. "Winter Ahead" (silent carol version) – 3:34
- Digital download and streaming – Yun Seok-cheol Trio version
1. "Winter Ahead" – 3:54
2. "Winter Ahead" (Yun Seok-cheol Trio version) – 3:44

== Credits and personnel ==
- V – vocals, songwriting
- Park Hyo-shin – vocals, songwriting
- Jesse Harris – songwriting
- Hyesung – songwriting, production
- Waizmin – songwriting, production

== Charts ==
=== Weekly charts ===
Weekly chart performance for "Winter Ahead"
Chart (2024–2025)	Peak position
Global 200 (Billboard)	33
Hong Kong (Billboard)	19
India International Streaming (IMI)	3
Japan Digital (Oricon)	5
Japan Download (Billboard Japan)	4
Lithuania (AGATA)	51
New Zealand Hot Singles (RMNZ)	4
Philippines (Philippines Hot 100)	41
Russia Streaming (TopHit)	58
Singapore Regional (RIAS)	8
South Korea (Circle)	70
UK Singles (OCC)	86
US Billboard Hot 100	99
US Holiday 100 (Billboard)	62
Vietnam Streaming (Vietnam Hot 100)	31

=== Monthly charts ===
Monthly chart performance for "Winter Ahead"
Chart (2024–2025)	Position
Russia Streaming (TopHit)	53
South Korea (Circle)	136

=== Decade-end charts ===
20s Decade-end chart performance
Chart (2025–2026)	Position
Russia Streaming (TopHit)	147

== Certifications ==
Region	Certification	Certified units/sales
New Zealand (RMNZ)	Gold	15,000^{‡}
^{‡} Sales+streaming figures based on certification alone.

== Release history ==
"Winter Ahead" release history
Region	Date	Format	Version	Label	Ref.
Various	November 29, 2024	CD single; digital download; streaming	Original	Big Hit	
Various	November 29, 2024	CD single	Instrumental	Big Hit	
Various	December 3, 2024	Digital download; streaming	Instrumental; silent carol	Big Hit	
Various	December 20, 2024	Digital download; streaming	Yun Seok-cheol Trio	Big Hit	
