= Christmas Tree (V song) =

2021 single by V

Single by V

from the album Our Beloved Summer OST Special
- Language: English; Korean
- Released: December 24, 2021
- Length: 3:30
- Label: Most Contents
- Songwriters: Nam Hye-seung; Kim Kyung-hee
- Producers: Nam Hye-seung; Kim Kyung-hee

V singles chronology
"Sweet Night" (2020)	"Christmas Tree" (2021)	"Love Me Again" (2023)

Music video
- "Christmas Tree" on YouTube

"Christmas Tree" is a song recorded by South Korean singer V of BTS, for the soundtrack of the South Korean television series Our Beloved Summer. It was released on December 24, 2021, by Most Contents.

== Track listing ==
Digital download/streaming

1. "Christmas Tree" – 3:30
2. "Christmas Tree" (instrumental) – 3:30

== Charts ==
=== Weekly charts ===
Weekly chart performance
Chart (2021–2022)	Peak position
Australia Digital Song Sales (Billboard)	6
Canada Hot 100 (Billboard)	82
Euro Digital Song Sales (Billboard)	1
France Digital Song Sales (Billboard)	7
Global 200 (Billboard)	51
Hungary (Single Top 40)	1
Italy Digital Song Sales (Billboard)	9
Japan Hot 100 (Billboard)	29
Japan Combined Singles (Oricon)	35
Malaysia (Billboard)	25
Philippines (Billboard)	22
South Korea (Gaon)	18
South Korea (K-pop 100)	25
Spain Digital Song Sales (Billboard)	3
Switzerland Digital Song Sales (Billboard)	2
UK Indie (OCC)	24
UK Singles Downloads (OCC)	2
UK Singles Sales (OCC)	2
US Billboard Hot 100	79
US Holiday 100 (Billboard)	54
Vietnam (Vietnam Hot 100)	13

=== Monthly charts ===
Monthly chart performance
Chart (2022)	Position
South Korea (Gaon)	20

=== Year-end charts ===
Year-end chart performance
Chart (2021)	Position
Hungary (Single Top 40)	51
South Korea (Circle)	98

== Certifications ==
Region	Certification	Certified units/sales
Canada (Music Canada)	Gold	40,000^{‡}
^{‡} Sales+streaming figures based on certification alone.

== Release history ==
Release history
Region	Date	Format	Label
Various	December 24, 2021	Digital download; streaming	Most Contents
