= EBS Hello Rookie Contest =

South Korean music competition

- Genre: Music competition
- Country of origin: South Korea
- Original language: Korean

Production
- Production companies: Ministry of Culture, Sports and Tourism; Korea Creative Content Agency; EBS

Original release
- Network: EBS
- Release: 2007 – present

Related
- The EBS space

EBS Hello Rookie Contest (Korean: EBS 헬로 루키 콘테스트) is a South Korean music competition aimed at discovering rookies, which began in 2007. The competition began as a project for rookies at The EBS space in 2007, and has been hosted by the Ministry of Culture, Sports and Tourism and co-hosted by the Korea Creative Content Agency and The EBS space since 2008. The two teams selected through video screening and public auditions every month have been introduced as "Hello Rookie of the Month" (이 달의 헬로 루키) on the stage of The EBS space, and application qualifications will be given to rookie musicians whose first album has been released for less than 2 years, or who have never released an album. EBS Hello Rookie Contest is considered an influential competition in the Korean independent music industry, the competition that sets the stage for rookie musicians to become famous.

== History ==
=== 2007 ===
Hello Rookie began in 2007, and the first year was a side program of The EBS space, where EBS's solo competition was held.

Hello Rookie Best	Qualification
Oh Jieun; Earpick; Loro's; Retana Suicide; 21 Scott	Phonebooth; Mary Story; Lanuna; Cotton Candy; Kickscotch; Witching Day; Javoisland; Did you know Robin was a rabbit Bye Bye Sea; Chami Project

=== 2008 ===
Since 2008, Ministry of Culture, Sports and Tourism, Korea Creative Content Agency, and Naver have co-hosted the competition with The EBS space, and with the final stage and award newly held. The competition have been divided into the first place "the Grand Prize", and the second place "the Special award for judges" and the "Popularity Award". Cha Seung-woo and Jang Yoon-ju hosted the final stage, and Kim Chang-wan Band and Onnine Ibalgwan performed special performances.

Grand Prize (1st)	Special award for judges	Popularity Award	Finalist
Guckkasten	Hanumpa	Kiha & The Faces	Go Go Star; Dry Flower; Majae; Barfly
Qualification
Zoo, Areumdaoon, Nabi, Vidulgi OoyoO, The Filmstar, Demian the Band, Lune, Kim Cheol-yeon, Lunatic, Ironic HUE, Polaroid, Mary Jane, Lee Young-hoon, Cheezestereo, Sweet Guerillaz, Dusty Blue

=== 2009 ===
In 2009, 22 new musicians and bands were named Hello Rookie, and 7 of whom made it to the final stage. There were special performances by Guckkasten, Kiha & The Faces, Kim Soo-chul and Lee Seung-hwan. Kim C and Jang Yoon-ju hosted the final stage.

Grand Prize (1st)	Special award for judges	Popularity Award	Finalist
Apollo 18	Telepathy	Joa Band	Hmm; No Reply; Park Joo-won; Daybreak
Qualification
Coffee, Soul Steady Rockers, Achtung, Victor View, Theatre 8, Hoona, Siwa, Nabimat, Go Go Boys, Romantic Punch, Oyster Boys, Monni, Gate Flowers, The Pony, The Koxx

=== 2010 ===
In 2010, Jang Ki-ha and Jang Yoon-ju hosted the final stage, coinciding with the sixth anniversary of EBS Space Hall. There were special performances by Bom Yeoreum Gaeul Kyeoul, Crying Nut, Clazziquai Project, Sweet Sorrow, Guckkasten, Apollo 18 and Supreme Team.

Grand Prize (1st)	Special award for judges	Popularity Award	Finalist
Yaya	Gajami Boys	Lalasweet	The United 93; Frenzy; Kim Nahyeon band The Quip
Qualification
Poe, Windycat, Telefly, Noeazy, Achime, Kimjandi band

=== 2011 ===
In 2011, Lee Seung-hwan was both the special stage and the host without a separate guarantee. Horan co-hosted the final stage, and there were special performances by Garion, Galaxy Express and Yaya.

Grand Prize (1st)	Special award for judges	Popularity Award	Finalist
Bye Bye Badman	Jambinai	Eastern Sidekick	Choi Goeun; Super 8 Beat; Electric Visor; PATiENTS
Qualification
Boni, Cho Gilsang, Ishtar, No Respect for Beauty, Gwamaegi, Should have brought a camera to dream, Nickea

=== 2012 ===
In 2012, Lee Seung-hwan and Younha hosted the final stage, and there were special performances by Bye Bye Badman, Daybreak and Crying Nut. From the year, the Popularity Award disappeared, and it was divided into the second-place qualifying Excellence Award and the third-place qualifying Special award for judges.

Grand Prize (1st)	Excellence Award (2nd)	Special award for judges (3rd)	Finalist
Core Magazine	Because I'm lonely	Miles Away	The Electriceels; Vains; Guten Birds; Park Soyoo
Qualification
Nuki, For the Secret, The Ninth, Fromm, Blocks

=== 2013 ===
Since 2013, the number of musicians who can perform in the final stage has decreased to six. Lee Seung-hwan and Rooftop Moonlight hosted the final stage. Core Magazine, Hello Rookie OB Special (Gate Flowers, Lee Jeonghoon, Baek Joonmyeong) and Delispice performed a special stage.

Grand Prize (1st)	Excellence Award (2nd)	Special award for judges (3rd)	Finalist
Rock N Roll Radio	Asian Chairshot	ECE	Squash Vines; Young Guys; Roundheads
Qualification
South Carnival, 24Hours, Square the Circle, April 2

=== 2014 ===
One of the final-stage bands, We hate JH failed to qualify earlier, but was selected as a wildcard. Lee Seung-hwan and Lady Jane hosted the final stage and there were special performances by Rock N Roll Radio, Idiotape, Hello Rookie OB Special (Daybreak X Romantic Punch), and Jeon In-kwon Band.

Grand Prize (1st)	Excellence Award (2nd)	Special award for judges (3rd)	Finalist
Cranfield	A'Zbus	Pavlov	Dead Buttons; MAN; We hate JH
Qualification
KwonTree, The Veggers, Monoban, The Roosters, Wings of the Isang

=== 2015 ===
In 2015, Lee Seung-hwan and Choi Hee hosted the final stage, and there were special performances by Ham Chun-ho & Jang Pil-soon, Guckkasten, The Solutions X The Koxx, and Cranfield.

Grand Prize (1st)	Excellence Award (2nd)	Special award for judges (3rd)	Finalist
A-Fuzz	Boys In The Kitchen	57	Earth Bound; DTSQ; Jun Bum Sun And The Yangbans
Qualification
Wasted johnny's, Light and Noise, Plugged Classic, Park Joonha, Room306, Hail

=== 2016 ===
In 2016, Lee Wonseok of Daybreak and Joo Woo-jae hosted the final stage. There were special performances by Song Chang-sik, Lee Seung-yeol x The Monotones, Sultan of the Disco, and A-Fuzz.

Grand Prize (1st)	Excellence Award (2nd)	Special award for judges (3rd)	Finalist
Silica Gel	Julia Dream	An Dayoung band	Raw By Peppers; O.When; Iksi
Qualification
The Hans, Hoa, Blue turtle Land, Crocodiles, Lee Seol-a

=== 2018 ===
2017 was the year EBS moved to Ilsandong District, and the competition was not held because it was difficult to proceed with the competition during this process. In 2018, a competition was held with six judges, including musicians, music critics, and performance producer. There were special performances of Moon Dancers, Romantic Punch, Kirara, Life and Time, and Daybreak.

Grand Prize (1st)	Excellence Award (2nd)	Special award for judges (3rd)	Finalist
Wussami	Surl	Decadent	Gong Joong Geu Neul; Ronny Chu; Yuha
Qualification
Ock & DDang, Uza & Shane, Kisnue, Silkbell

=== 2019 ===
In 2019, Daybreak's Lee Wonseok and Soran's Ko Youngbae hosted the final stage. There were special performances by Peppertones, Se So Neon, Wussami and Surl.

Grand Prize (1st)	Excellence Award (2nd)	Special award for judges (3rd)	Finalist
Airy	Cha Sae Dae	Winter to Spring	Duoxini; Budung; Oyeol
Qualification
Kim Seonghwa group, Monotheism, Damye, Meaningful Stone

=== 2022 ===
2020 and 2021 were not held due to the COVID-19 pandemic. From July 2022, 6 musicians were selected for the final stage through two music screenings, live screenings, and the third round. There were special performances by Soran, Nucksal X Cadejo and Silica Gel.

Grand Prize (1st)	Excellence Award (2nd)	Special award for judges (3rd)	Finalist
JisokuryClub	Dajeong	Hwanho	Moskva Surfing Club; Hanroro; Tuesday Beach Club
Qualification
Soombee, Cotoba, Leson, Low Hanging Fruits
