= List of Jannabi live performances =

Jannabi live performances
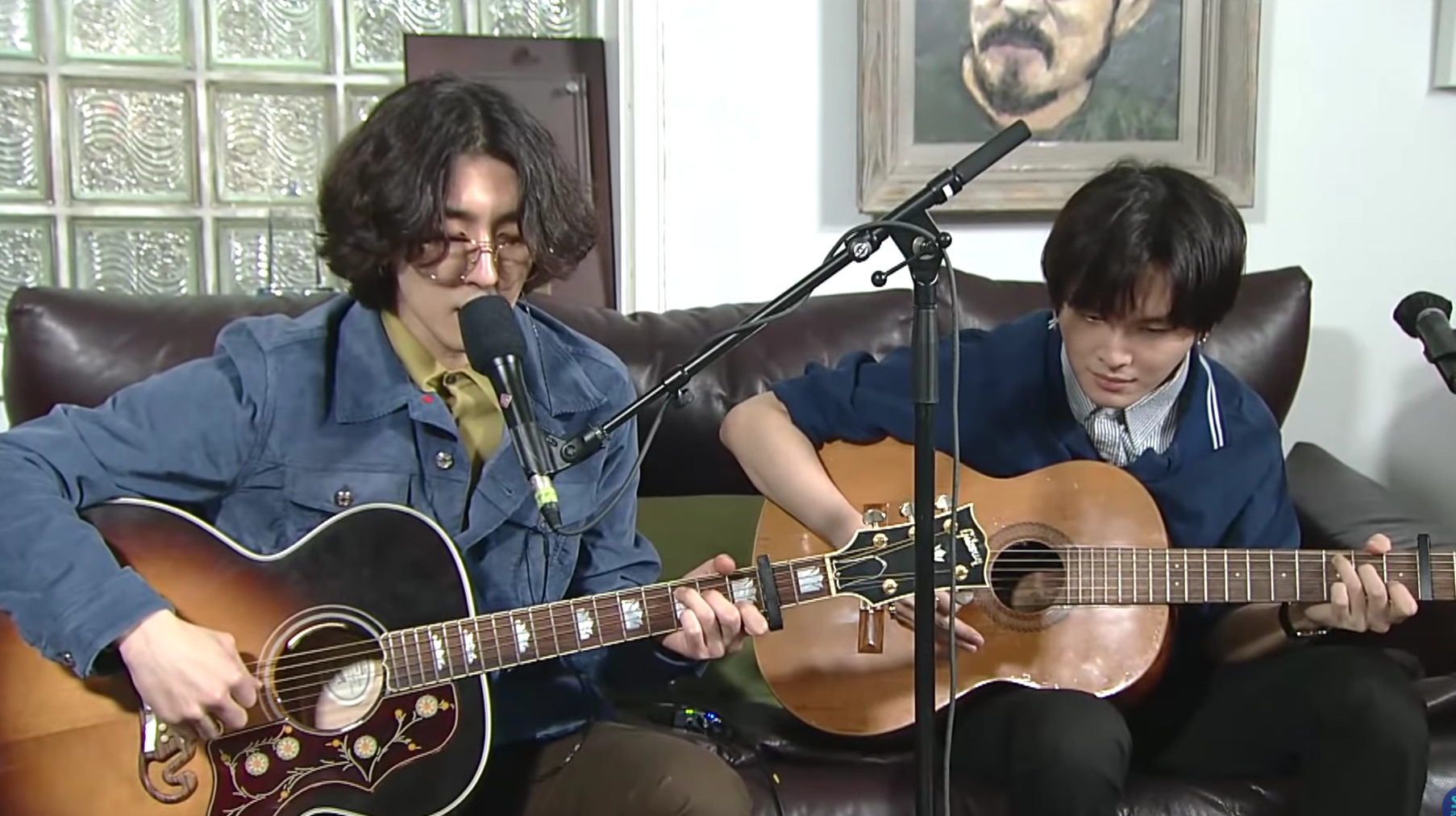
- Jannabi in 2020
- Concert tours: 7
- One-off concerts: 17
- Joint concerts and tours: 11
- Guest appearances: 4
- Music festivals: 82
- University festivals: 77
- Award shows: 11
- Television shows and specials: 68
- Sporting events: 3
- Other live performances: 18

South Korean indie rock band Jannabi has headlined seven concert tours and seventeen one-off concerts. They additionally performed at numerous music and university festivals, awards shows, and sporting events, as well as on TV and radio.

Jannabi began performing live by busking on the streets over 100 times and performing in underground clubs over 70 times in the Hongdae area of Seoul. They gradually expanded their venues by releasing albums and participating in competitions, festivals, and broadcasts to communicate with the public. Following the release of their second studio album in 2019, Legend, Jannabi embarked on their first sold-out concert tour, Together, performing across five cities in South Korea and attracting 7,600 spectators. This was followed by the band's sold-out second tour in 2020, Nonsense II, which was originally slated to conduct eight shows but was cancelled in the middle of the touring period with the onset of the COVID-19 pandemic. With the health protocols lifted in 2022, the band has headlined more than twenty music and university festivals in South Korea. The band later embarked on their third concert tour, Fantastic Old-fashioned End of the Year Party!, comprising twenty shows across eight cities in South Korea from 2022-2023. In 2024, Fantastic Old Fashioned 2024: Movie Star Rising, their fourth sold-out concert tour, happened, attracting over 40,000 audiences for their Jamsil Arena shows. In the same year, Jannabi achieved the feat of becoming the first band formed after the 2010s to headline the Incheon Pentaport Rock Festival. Seven months later, in 2025, All the Boys and Girls was held, and a two-day encore concert in the KSPO Dome for the first time since their debut ensued, which won the Grand Prize in the Concert Category at the Edaily Culture Awards. Chorus Night 2026: The Party Anthem concert took place by the end of the year 2025 and beginning of the year 2026. In 2026, Jannabi will embark on their first Asian concert tour, titled "Sweat & Stardust," including seven stops, namely Taipei, Hong Kong, Tokyo, Singapore, Bangkok, Kuala Lumpur, and Jakarta. They also performed at various award shows, including the Baeksang Arts Awards, Blue Dragon Series Awards, MAMA Awards, and Melon Music Awards. Additionally, they were invited to perform exclusively at stadiums and arenas for sporting events, such as halftime shows and post-match concerts.

== Concerts ==
=== Concert tours ===
List of concert tours, showing dates, number of shows, and attendances
Year	Title	Inclusive Dates	Location	Shows	Attendance
2019	Together	March 16, 2019 – April 13, 2019	South Korea	7	7,600
Together (Korean: 투게더) was the first concert tour by Jannabi in support of their second studio album, Legend (2019). The tour visited five cities in South Korea: Seoul, Cheongju, Daegu, Busan, and Jeonju. Tickets to the show were sold out after opening to the public on February 15, 2019. They performed for over 7,600 people across five Korean cities.
2020	Nonsense II	February 15, 2020 – February 22, 2020	South Korea	3	-
Nonsense II (Korean: 넌센스2) was the second concert tour by Jannabi. The tour began on February 15, 2020, with two dates in Seoul, and continued on February 22, 2020, in Gwangju. While the 20,000 tickets to the nationwide concert were sold-out from the time it was put on sale, Peponi Music later announced that Daegu, Busan, and Chuncheon concerts, five shows in total, scheduled from February 29 to March 21, 2020, will be cancelled due to the COVID-19 pandemic.
2022–2023	Fantastic Old-fashioned End of the Year Party!	November 5, 2022 – January 29, 2023	South Korea	20	50,000
Fantastic Old-fashioned End of the Year Party! (Korean: 판타스틱 올드 패션드 송년회) was the third concert tour headlined by Jannabi. It was their first solo concert in about three years since the Nonsense II concert held in February 2020. The group had twenty shows in eight cities in South Korea: Busan, Gwangju, Seoul, Incheon, Daegu, Suwon, Chuncheon, and Cheonan. The tour had 160,000 waiting numbers during the general sales and recorded a sold-out procession per location. Due to high demand, additional limited-view seat tickets for Seoul, Daegu, and Chuncheon performances were made available for purchase. The tour gathered 50,000 people in total and was recorded as one of South Korea's highest-grossing tours in 2023.
2024	Fantastic Old Fashioned 2024: Movie Star Rising	August 31, 2024 – September 15, 2024	South Korea	6	-
Fantastic Old Fashioned 2024: Movie Star Rising (Korean: 판타스틱 올드 패션드 2024: 무비 스타 라이징) was the fourth concert tour headlined by Jannabi. It was their first solo concert in about one year and seven months since the Fantastic Old-fashioned End of the Year Party! concert tour. The concert began at Jamsil Arena in Seoul on August 31, September 1, 7, and 8. The band then travelled to Busan and performed at BEXCO Auditorium on September 14 and 15.
2025	All the Boys and Girls 2025	April 26, 2025 – June 29, 2025	South Korea	10	-
All the Boys and Girls 2025 (Korean: 모든소년소녀들) was the fifth concert tour headlined by Jannabi. This was approximately seven months following their nationwide tour in 2024. The group had sold out ten shows in three cities in South Korea: Seoul, Gwangju, and Busan, beginning on April 26 and concluding on June 29. Aftersuch, the band held a two-day encore concert in the KSPO Dome for the first time since their debut as the tour's grand finale on August 2–3.
2025–2026	Chorus Night 2026: The Party Anthem	December 27, 2025 – January 4, 2026	South Korea	4	over 21,000
Chorus Night 2026: The Party Anthem (Korean: 합창의 밤 2026: The Party Anthem) was a large-scale winter party concert headlined by Jannabi. The concert took place on December 27-28, 2025, at Jamsil Arena in Seoul, and on January 3-4, 2026, at BEXCO Exhibition Center 1 Hall 1 in Busan. All shows went on sale to the general public on November 27, 2025, and instantly sold out the same day, attracting over 21,000 audiences.
2026	Jannabi 1st Asia Tour: Sweat & Stardust	June 27, 2026 – August 23, 2026	Taiwan, Hong Kong, Japan, Singapore, Thailand, Malaysia, Indonesia	7	TBA
Jannabi 1st Asia Tour: Sweat & Stardust is the first Asian concert tour of Jannabi announced on May 1, 2026. The concert tour included six stops, namely, Taipei, Hong Kong, Tokyo, Singapore, Bangkok, Kuala Lumpur, and Jakarta. On the title's meaning, Choi Jung-hoon briefly explained: "We came up with it while imagining sparkling particles being scattered over sweat on our foreheads."

=== One-off concerts ===
List of one-off concerts, showing dates, locations, and attendances
Title	Date	City	Country	Venue	Attendance	Ref.
Jannabi 1st Mini Concert	June 21, 2013	Seoul	South Korea	Tungsten Hall, Hongdae	—N/a	
November Rain	November 7, 2014	Seoul	South Korea	Club Ta, Hongdae	100	
Operation Youth	March 21, 2015	Seoul	South Korea	Evans Lounge, Hongdae	—N/a	
Fire	July 4, 2015	Seoul	South Korea	Rolling Hall, Hongdae	200	
Thank You	July 25, 2015	Seoul	South Korea	Evans Lounge, Hongdae	90	
Change	November 28, 2015	Seoul	South Korea	Hyundai Card Understage	200	
Monkey Hotel	June 18, 2016	Seoul	South Korea	KT&G Sangsang Madang Live Hall	500	
Jannabi and the New World	December 18, 2016	Seoul	South Korea	KT&G Sangsang Madang Live Hall	500	
Stop, look and listen	July 15–16, 2017	Seoul	South Korea	Samsung Hall, Ewha Womans University	1,400	
Fantastic Old-fashioned End of the Year Party!	December 30–31, 2017	Seoul	South Korea	KT&G Sangsang Madang Live Hall	720	
You Hee-yeol Curated 12 Group Sound 'Jannabi'	June 2–3, 2018	Seoul	South Korea	Hyundai Card Understage	700	
82.6% Waiting Heart	August 26, 2018	Seoul	South Korea	COEX Auditorium	1,080	
Nonsense	November 24–25, 2018	Seoul	South Korea	Blue Square iMarket Hall	2,800	
Fools on the Hill	July 13–14, 2019	Seoul	South Korea	Hyundai Card Understage	900	
Fantastic Old-fashioned Returns!	August 31 – September 1, 2019	Seoul	South Korea	Olympic Hall	6,000	
All the Boys and Girls 2125	August 2–3, 2026	Seoul	South Korea	KSPO Dome	20,000	
Jannabi Live : Taipei I	November 9, 2025	Taipei	Taiwan	Zepp New Taipei	2,245	

=== Joint concerts and tours ===
List of joint concerts and tours, dates, locations, and relevant information
Event	Date	Venue	City	Country	Relevant information	Ref.
Shinhan Card GREAT Rookie Project 2015 Opening Concert	May 16, 2015	MUV Concert Hall	Seoul	South Korea	Co-headlined with the Mamas Gun, Monni, A'Zbus, and Reflex	
Shinhan Card GREAT Rookie Project 2016 Opening Concert	May 7, 2016	KT&G Sangsang Madang Hongdae	Seoul	South Korea	Co-headlined with the The Koxx and Maan	
Hi Rock Concert Season 2	October 8, 2016	Anyang Arts Center	Anyang	South Korea	Co-headlined with the Guckkasten, Buzz, and Monni	
On Stage Live	April 27, 2017	Ayang Art Center	Daegu	South Korea	Co-headlined with the Pia, Zagmachi, and Danggisio	
2017 KB Art Hall Artist Support Series 'SHOW-BREAKERS'	June 2, 2017	KB Art Hall	Seoul	South Korea	Co-headlined with the Burningsoda	
2017 KB Art Hall Artist Support Series 'SHOW-BREAKERS'	June 9, 2017	KB Art Hall	Busan	South Korea	Co-headlined with the Burningsoda	
KB Art Hall Artist Support Series Year-end Festival <ADIEU 2017>	December 2, 2017	KB Art Hall	Seoul	South Korea	Co-headlined with the No Reply, Burningsoda, Moonscent, The Solutions, and Jungheum Band	
KB Art Hall Artist Support Series Year-end Festival <ADIEU 2017>	December 9, 2017	KB Art Hall	Busan	South Korea	Co-headlined with the No Reply, Burningsoda, Moonscent, The Solutions, and Jungheum Band	
Under the Roof with Jannabi	June 22, 2018	KT&G Sangsang Madang Hongdae	Seoul	South Korea	Co-headlined with the One Bottle and Choi Sang-yeop	
PRESENT	December 29-30, 2018	KT&G Sangsang Madang Hongdae	Seoul	South Korea	Year-end joint concert co-headlined with the MacGuffin and The Poles	
ELLE 30th Anniversary Reconnect Concert	October 6, 2022	Blue Square Mastercard Hall	Seoul	South Korea	Co-headlined with Code Kunst, Simon Dominic, and Sogumm	
K-Indie Music Night	July 27, 2022	Damrosch Park	New York City	United States	Co-headlined with the Bye Bye Sea with 4,000 attendees	
KBS Immortal Songs Live Concert in US	October 26, 2023	Prudential Center	Newark, New Jersey	United States	Setlist: "For Lovers Who Hesitate"; "Summer"; "In the Rain" (Lee Moon-sae cover with Ateez's Jongho); "Dreams, Books, Power, and Walls"; "Come Back Home"; "Knockin' on Heaven's Door" (Bob Dylan cover)	
Korea On Stage in London	November 8, 2023	OVO Arena Wembley	London	United Kingdom	Setlist: "Together!"; "Legend"; "Summer"; "For Lovers Who Hesitate"; "Hey Jude" (The Beatles cover with Henry Moodie)	

=== Guest appearances ===
List of guest appearances, headlining artists, dates, locations, and songs performed
Title	Headlining artist	Date	Venue	City	Song(s) performed	Ref.
PSY's Summer Swag 2026 Concert	Psy	July 18, 2026	Seoul Grand Park	Gwacheon	"Baby I Need You"; "For Lovers Who Hesitate"; "What's Up?"	
PSY's Summer Swag 2025 Concert	Psy	July 13, 2025	Daejeon Mokwon University Main Stadium	Daejeon	"Baby I Need You"; "Summer"; "For Lovers Who Hesitate"; "What's Up?"	
PSY's Summer Swag 2025 Concert	Psy	August 16, 2025	Busan Asiad Auxiliary Stadium	Busan	"Baby I Need You"; "Summer"; "For Lovers Who Hesitate"; "What's Up?"	
NUT 30 Festival	Crying Nut	October 29, 2025	KT&G Sangsang Madang Hongdae	Seoul	"Baby I Need You"; "Rocket"; "Summer"; "Legend"; "Tell Me"; "Colorful"; "Jungle"; "What's Up?"; "See Your Eyes"; "For Lovers Who Hesitate"	

== Festivals ==
=== Music Festivals ===
List of festival performances, showing dates, locations, and relevant information
Event	Date	Venue	City	Country	Ref.
Incheon Pentaport Rock Festival (Note: Penta Super Rookie winner)	August 3, 2014	Songdo Moonlight Festival Park	Incheon	South Korea	
New Year World Rock Festival (Note: Selected through Naver Music Musician League)	December 19, 2014	AX-KOREA	Seoul	South Korea	
Green Plugged Seoul (Note: Selected as one of the Rookie Green Friends)	May 23, 2015	Nanji Hangang Park	Seoul	South Korea	
Gwangju Summer Universiade Youth Festival	July 7, 2015	Asian Culture Complex & Geumnam Park Stage	Seoul	South Korea	
Incheon Pentaport Rock Festival	August 8, 2015	Songdo Moonlight Festival Park	Incheon	South Korea	
Let's Rock Festival	September 20, 2015	Nanji Hangang Park	Seoul	South Korea	
Incheon Pentaport Rock Festival	August 14, 2016	Songdo Moonlight Festival Park	Incheon	South Korea	
Let's Rock Festival	September 25, 2016	Nanji Hangang Park	Seoul	South Korea	
Green Plugged Seoul	May 29, 2017	Nanji Hangang Park	Seoul	South Korea	
Smile, LOve, Weekend! (SLOW) Festival	June 18, 2017	Nanji Hangang Park	Seoul	South Korea	
Jisan Valley Rock Festival	July 28, 2017	Jisan Valley Ski Resort	Incheon	South Korea	
Jeonju Ultimate Music Festival	August 6, 2017	Jeonju Sports Complex Stadium	Jeonju	South Korea	
Let's Rock Festival	September 23, 2017	Nanji Hangang Park	Seoul	South Korea	
KT&G Sangsang Realization Festival	October 14, 2017	KT&G Sangsang Madang Chuncheon	Chuncheon	South Korea	
Grand Mint Festival	October 22, 2017	Olympic Park	Seoul	South Korea	
Youth Festival	May 13, 2018	Nanji Hangang Park	Seoul	South Korea	
Green Plugged Seoul	May 20, 2018	Nanji Hangang Park	Seoul	South Korea	
Samda Park Night Concert (Note: Headliner)	May 25, 2018	Samda Park	Jeju	South Korea	
Changdong Culture Station (Note: Free-of-charge performance)	June 23, 2018	Changdong Municipal Stadium, Platform Changdong 61	Seoul	South Korea	
Midnight Picnic Festival	July 14, 2018	Goseong Sampo Beach	Goseong County, Gangwon	South Korea	
Urban Music Festival	July 21, 2018	Sejong University Convention Center	Seoul	South Korea	
Green Plugged Donghae	July 22, 2018	Mangsang Beach	Donghae	South Korea	
Jeonju Ultimate Music Festival	August 5, 2018	Jeonju Sports Complex Stadium	Jeonju	South Korea	
Incheon Pentaport Rock Festival	August 11, 2018	Songdo Moonlight Festival Park	Incheon	South Korea	
Busan International Rock Festival	August 12, 2018	Samnak Ecological Park	Busan	South Korea	
Melody Forest Camp	September 8, 2018	Jarasum	Gapyeong County	South Korea	
Let's Rock Festival	September 15, 2018	Nanji Hangang Park	Seoul	South Korea	
Green Plugged Gyeongju	September 16, 2018	Hwangseong Park	Gyeongju	South Korea	
Youth Arena	October 6, 2018	Incheon Munhak Stadium	Incheon	South Korea	
KFM Radio Show Hangul Cultural Festival	October 8, 2018	Gwanghwamun Square	Seoul	South Korea	
KT&G Sangsang Realization Festival	October 13, 2018	KT&G Sangsang Madang Chuncheon	Chuncheon	South Korea	
Bupyeong Music City Festival: Music Gathering 2018	October 27, 2018	Bupyeong Arts Center	Incheon	South Korea	
Samda Park Night Concert	April 26, 2019	Samda Park	Jeju	South Korea	
Shinhan DoDream Space Creator Festival	April 28, 2019	Shinhan DoDream Space Center	Seoul	South Korea	
Youth Festival	May 11, 2019	Nanji Hangang Park	Seoul	South Korea	
2019 Open The Concert	May 18, 2019	Dongtan Complex Culture Center	Hwaseong	South Korea	
Green Plugged Seoul	May 19, 2019	Nanji Hangang Park	Seoul	South Korea	
Hansoowon Art Festival (HAF 2019)	May 25, 2019	Gyeongju Civic Stadium	Gyeongju	South Korea	
Rainbow Music & Camping Festival	June 1, 2019	Jarasum	Gapyeong County	South Korea	
DMZ Peace Train Music Festival	June 8, 2019	Goseokjeong Pavilion	Cheorwon County	South Korea	
Seongnam Park Concert	June 15, 2019	Bundang Central Park Outdoor Theater	Seongnam	South Korea	
Urban Music Festival	July 20, 2019	Daegu Exhibition & Convention Center (EXCO) Hall 2	Daegu	South Korea	
Busan International Rock Festival	July 27, 2019	Samnak Ecological Park	Busan	South Korea	
Jeonju Ultimate Music Festival	August 4, 2019	Jeonju Sports Complex Stadium	Jeonju	South Korea	
2019 Summer Art Festival 'Starry Starry Summer Night'	August 16, 2019	Westin Josun Seoul Hotel	Seoul	South Korea	
Let's Rock Festival (Note: Sub-headliner)	September 21, 2019	Nanji Hangang Park	Seoul	South Korea	
Green Plugged Gyeongju	September 28, 2019	Gyeongju World Culture Expo Park	Gyeongju	South Korea	
KT&G Sangsang Realization Festival	October 12, 2019	KT&G Sangsang Madang Chuncheon	Chuncheon	South Korea	
Grand Mint Festival	October 19, 2019	Olympic Park	Seoul	South Korea	
Da Vinci Motel (Note: Surprise performance)	October 25, 2019	Hyundai Card Music Library	Itaewon	South Korea	
Someday Theatre Pleroma	November 16, 2019	COEX Hall D	Seoul	South Korea	
8th Seongnam City Tong Sweet Potato Festival (8th Seongnam-si Tonggoguma Festival)	November 27, 2019	Opera House of Seongnam Arts Center	Seongnam	South Korea	
December’s Sweetest Music Festival (Winter Diary)	December 24, 2019	Hotel Susung Convention Hall	Daegu	South Korea	
Beautiful Mint Life	May 13, 2022	Olympic Park	Seoul	South Korea	
KT&G Sangsang Realization Festival	June 11, 2022	KT&G Sangsang Madang Chuncheon	Chuncheon	South Korea	
Incheon Pentaport Rock Festival	August 6, 2022	Songdo Moonlight Festival Park	Incheon	South Korea	
Jecheon International Music & Film Festival 'One Summer Night'	August 15, 2022	Mosan Airport	Jecheon	South Korea	
Seongnam Park Concert	August 20, 2022	Bundang Central Park Outdoor Theater	Seongnam and YouTube Live Streaming	South Korea	
Someday Festival: Just Music + Unique Festival	September 3, 2022	Nanji Hangang Park	Seoul	South Korea	
Chilpo Jazz Festival	September 17, 2022	Chilpo Beach	Pohang	South Korea	
Joy Olpark Festival	September 24, 2022	Olympic Park	Seoul	South Korea	
Busan International Rock Festival	October 1, 2022	Samnak Ecological Park	Busan	South Korea	
Gyeonggi Indie Music Festival	October 15, 2022	Gyeongin Ara Waterway Ara Marina	Gimpo	South Korea	
2023 Gyeongrok Festival: Mapo Renaissance	February 9-10, 2023	Crying Nut YouTube Live Streaming	-	South Korea	
Da Vinci Montel	September 16, 2023	Hyundai Card Understage	Itaewon	South Korea	
Hana Playlist Concert	September 17, 2023	Yonsei University Open-Air Theater	Seoul	South Korea	
Seongnam Park Concert	October 7, 2023	Bundang Central Park Outdoor Theater	Seongnam and YouTube Live Streaming	South Korea	
20th Odaesan Cultural Festival	October 14, 2023	Woljeongsa Temple	Odaesan and YouTube Live Streaming	South Korea	
The Glow 2024	April 13, 2024	KINTEX	Seoul	South Korea	
KT&G Sangsang Realization Festival	April 27, 2024	KT&G Sangsang Madang Chuncheon	Chuncheon	South Korea	
Seoul Jazz Festival	June 1, 2024	KSPO Dome	Seoul	South Korea	
Seoul Park Music Festival	June 29, 2024	Olympic Park	Seoul	South Korea	
Incheon Pentaport Rock Festival	August 4, 2024	Songdo Moonlight Festival Park	Incheon	South Korea	
Seoripul Festival	September 29, 2024	Banpo-daero	Seoul	South Korea	
Busan International Rock Festival	October 5, 2024	Samnak Ecological Park	Busan	South Korea	
Hana Playlist Concert	October 6, 2024	Yonsei University Open-Air Theater	Seoul	South Korea	
The Glow 2025	March 29, 2025	KINTEX	Seoul	South Korea	
Seoul Jazz Festival	May 30, 2025	KSPO Dome	Seoul	South Korea	
2025 KT Voyage to Jarasum	September 6, 2025	Jarasum	Gapyeong County	South Korea	
Woori Momocon	September 21, 2025	Nanji Hangang Park	Seoul	South Korea	
Asia Top Artist Festival	September 27, 2025	Nanji Hangang Park	Seoul	South Korea	
Color in Music Festival	November 1, 2025	Paradise City	Incheon	South Korea	
Seoul Park Music Festival	June 20, 2026	Olympic Park	Seoul	South Korea	
Asia Top Artist Festival	September 20, 2026	Nanji Hangang Park	Seoul	South Korea	
Busan International Rock Festival	October 3, 2026	Samnak Ecological Park	Busan	South Korea	

=== University Festivals ===
List of university festivals, dates, and locations
Title	Date	City	Venue	Ref.
Hongik University New Student Welcome Cultural Festival	March 4, 2015	Seoul	Hongik University	
Seowon University Festival	April 8, 2015	Cheongju	Seowon University	
Sungkyunkwan University (Humanities and Social Sciences Campus) Festival	May 14, 2015	Seoul	Sungkyunkwan University	
Kookmin University Festival	May 19, 2015	Seoul	Kookmin University	
Korea National Sport University Festival	May 20, 2015	Seoul	Korea National Sport University	
Hongik University Festival	May 21, 2015	Seoul	Hongik University	
Ajou University Festival	May 26, 2015	Suwon	Ajou University	
Suwon Women's University Festival	September 17, 2015	Suwon	Suwon Women's University	
Sogang University Festival	September 18, 2015	Seoul	Sogang University	
Sungkyunkwan University (Humanities and Social Sciences Campus) Festival	September 23, 2015	Seoul	Sungkyunkwan University	
Hoseo University (Cheonan Campus) Festival	September 24, 2015	Cheonan	Hoseo University	
Sungkyunkwan University (Natural Sciences Campus) Festival	October 8, 2015	Suwon	Sungkyunkwan University	
Konkuk University Festival	November 12, 2015	Seoul	Konkuk University	
Sungkyunkwan University (Humanities and Social Sciences) Festival 'ESKARA'	May 9, 2018	Seoul	Sungkyunkwan University	
Chung-Ang University Festival ‘100°C’	May 14, 2018	Seoul	Chung-Ang University	
Hongik University Festival	May 17, 2018	Seoul	Hongik University	
Korea University Stone Pagoda Festival: KUniverse	May 22, 2018	Seoul	Korea University	
Seoul Institute of the Arts Festival	September 19, 2018	Seoul	Seoul Institute of the Arts	
Kookmin University Festival	October 2, 2018	Seoul	Kookmin University	
Korea National University of Education Festival	October 4, 2018	Cheongju	Korea National University of Education	
Chung-Ang University Festival ‘Go beyond 100’	October 5, 2018	Seoul	Chung-Ang University	
Chungbuk National University Festival	October 11, 2018	Cheongju	Chungbuk National University	
Hankuk University of Foreign Studies Festival	October 12, 2018	Seoul	Hankuk University of Foreign Studies	
Baekseok Culture University Festival	May 15, 2019	Cheonan	Baekseok Culture University	
Hongik University Festival	May 16, 2019	Seoul	Hongik University	
Kyung Hee University Festival	May 17, 2019	Seoul	Kyung Hee University	
Hansei University Festival	May 21, 2019	Gunpo	Hansei University	
Korea University Stone Pagoda Festival 'KU:KEY'	May 22, 2019	Seoul	Korea University	
Sungkyunkwan University (Natural Sciences Campus) Festival	May 23, 2019	Suwon	Sungkyunkwan University	
Kaywon High School of Arts Festival	May 24, 2019	Seongnam	Kaywon High School of Arts	
Korea University of Media Arts Festival 'TIK-TOK: Time In the Kuma, Time On the Kuma'	September 18, 2019	Sejong	Korea University of Media Arts	
Hanyang University Festival 'Rachios'	September 25, 2019	Seoul	Hanyang University	
Korea Polytechnic University Festival	September 26, 2019	Siheung	Korea Polytechnic University	
Soongsil University Festival	September 27, 2019	Seoul	Soongsil University	
Kyung Hee University Festival	October 2, 2019	Seoul	Kyung Hee University	
Yatap High School Festival	December 30, 2019	Seongnam	Yatap High School Auditorium	
Seohyun Middle School Festival	December 30, 2019	Seongnam	Seohyun Middle School Auditorium	
Kyung Hee University Festival 'MASTERPEACE: Re,Play'	May 24, 2022	Seoul	Kyung Hee University	
Korea University Festival 'KUrescendo'	May 25, 2022	Seoul	Korea University	
Hanyang University Festival 'Rachios'	May 26, 2022	Seoul	Hanyang University	
Hankuk University of Foreign Studies Festival 'Hang Out'	May 27, 2022	Seoul	Hankuk University of Foreign Studies	
Sangmyung University Festival	May 30, 2022	Cheonan	Sangmyung University	
Seoul National University of Education Festival 'Dear My Youth'	September 19, 2022	Seoul	Seoul National University of Education	
Seoul National University of Science and Technology Festival	September 21, 2022	Seoul	Seoul National University of Science and Technology	
Chung-Ang University (College of Engineering) Festival 'BLUE MOON'	September 22, 2022	Seoul	Chung-Ang University	
Kyung Hee University Festival 'MASTERPEACE:Ready,Set,Play'	September 29, 2022	Seoul	Kyung Hee University	
Soongsil University Festival	September 30, 2022	Seoul	Soongsil University	
Myongji University Festival	October 5, 2022	Seoul	Myongji University	
Konkuk University Festival	October 26, 2022	Seoul	Konkuk University	
Yatap High School Festival	December 28, 2023	Seongnam	Yatap High School Auditorium	
Jeonbuk National University Festival	May 8, 2024	Jeonju	Jeonbuk National University	
Seoul National University Festival	May 9, 2024	Seoul	Seoul National University	
Ewha Womans University Festival	May 10, 2024	Seoul	Ewha Womans University	
Sungkyunkwan University (Natural Sciences Campus) Festival	May 16, 2024	Suwon	Sungkyunkwan University	
Kaywon High School of Arts Festival	May 17, 2024	Kaywon High School of Arts	Seongnam	
Soongsil University Festival	May 17, 2024	Seoul	Soongsil University	
Kyungpook National University Festival	May 21, 2024	Daegu	Kyungpook National University	
Kyung Hee University Festival	May 23, 2024	Seoul	Kyung Hee University	
Hanyang University Festival	May 24, 2024	Seoul	Hanyang University	
Korea University Festival 'IPSELENTI'	May 25, 2024	Seoul	Korea University	
Hanyang University (ERICA Campus) Festival	May 28, 2024	Ansan	Hanyang University (ERICA Campus)	
Dongguk University Festival	May 29, 2024	Seoul	Dongguk University	
Chung-Ang University Festival	May 30, 2024	Seoul	Chung-Ang University	
Dankook University Festival	May 8, 2025	Cheonan	Dankook University	
Sungkyunkwan University Festival	May 9, 2025	Seoul	Sungkyunkwan University	
Sejong University Festival	May 14, 2025	Seoul	Sejong University	
Inha University Festival	May 15, 2025	Incheon	Inha University	
Hongik University Festival	May 16, 2025	Seoul	Hongik University	
Konkuk University Festival	May 20, 2025	Seoul	Konkuk University	
Soongsil University Festival	May 22, 2025	Seoul	Soongsil University	
Hanyang University Festival	May 23, 2025	Seoul	Hanyang University	
Yeungnam University Festival	May 27, 2025	Gyeongsan	Yeungnam University	
Chosun University Festival	May 28, 2025	Gwangju	Chosun University	
Gachon University Festival	September 10, 2025	Seongnam	Gachon University	
Kyung Hee University Festival	September 16, 2025	Seoul	Kyung Hee University	
Dankook University Festival 'TWILIGHT'	September 24, 2025	Yongin	Dankook University	
Chonnam National University Festival	September 30, 2025	Gwangju	Chonnam National University	
Chosun University Festival 'GRACIA'	May 7, 2026	Gwangju	Chosun University	
Jeonbuk National University Festival	May 8, 2026	Jeonju	Jeonbuk National University	
Kwangwoon University Festival	May 13, 2026	Seoul	Kwangwoon University	
Sungkyunkwan University Festival	May 15, 2026	Seoul	Sungkyunkwan University	
Konkuk University Festival	May 19, 2026	Seoul	Konkuk University	
Ajou University Festival	May 20, 2026	Suwon	Ajou University	
Sangmyung University Festival	May 21, 2026	Seoul	Sangmyung University	
Yonsei University Festival 'AKARAKA'	May 23, 2026	Seoul	Yonsei University	
Keimyung University Festival	May 26, 2026	Daegu	Keimyung University	
Pusan National University Festival	May 27, 2026	Busan	Pusan National University	
Kyung Hee University Festival	May 29, 2026	Seoul	Kyung Hee University	

== Award shows ==
List of awards show performances, showing event names, dates, locations, and performed songs
Event	Date	Country	Performed song(s)	Ref.
2017 KBS Radio Drama Awards	December 22, 2017	South Korea	"Wonderful"	
55th Baeksang Arts Awards	May 1, 2019	South Korea	"The Peak" (Kim Min-ki cover)	
V Live Awards	November 16, 2019	South Korea	"For Lovers Who Hesitate"	
2019 Melon Music Awards	November 30, 2019	South Korea	"Good Good Night"; "For Lovers Who Hesitate"	
34th Golden Disc Awards	January 4, 2020	South Korea	"Good Good Night"; "For Lovers Who Hesitate"	
2021 Mnet Asian Music Awards	December 11, 2021	South Korea	"A Thought on an Autumn Night"; "I Know Where The Rainbow has Fallen"	
32nd Seoul Music Awards	January 19, 2023	South Korea	"GRIPPIN'THEGREEN"; "For Lovers Who Hesitate"	
2nd Blue Dragon Series Awards	July 19, 2023	South Korea	"She"; "Summer"	
The Fact Music Awards	October 10, 2023	South Korea	"A Thought on an Autumn Night"; "Pony"	
Korean Popular Culture and Arts Awards	October 31, 2024	South Korea	"Summer"	
Edaily Culture Awards	December 2, 2025	South Korea	"Summer"; "A thought on an autumn night"; "May the TENDERNESS be with you!"; "LEGEND"; "for lovers who hesitate"	

== Television shows and specials ==
List of TV performances, showing event names, dates, locations, and performed songs where applicable
Event	Date	Country	Performed song(s)	Ref.
All That Music	April 2, 2015	South Korea	"Rocket”; "Baby I Need You”; ”See Your Eyes"	
Nanjang	May 9, 2015	South Korea	"Rocket”; "See Your Eyes”; "Moon”; "November Rain”; ”Blue Spring"	
All That Music	October 20, 2015	South Korea	"November Rain”; "Baby I Need You”	
Nanjang	April 24, 2016	South Korea	"Cuckoo”; "See Your Eyes”; "Colorful”; "November Rain”; ”Baby I Need You"	
All That Music	October 6, 2016	South Korea	"Wish”; "Baby I Need You”; "What’s Up?" (4 Non Blondes cover)	
2016 DMC Festival (Note: The MBC-sponsored episode was held as a concert outdoors at Digital Media City in Sangam, Seoul.)	October 12, 2016	South Korea	"Cuckoo”; "Colorful"	
Nanjang	October 15, 2016	South Korea	"Colorful”; "The Secret of Hard Rock”; "Hong Kong”; ”Baby I Need You"	
EBS Space Empathy	November 3, 2016	South Korea	"Goodnight (Intro)”; "Summer”; ”Hong Kong"	
Nanjang	January 14, 2017	South Korea	"Goodnight (Intro)”; "Summer”; "The Secret of Hard Rock”; "Jungle”; "Monkey Hotel”; "Can I Laugh”; ”Colorful"	
You Hee-yeol's Sketchbook	February 18, 2017	South Korea	"Summer"; "Reality" (Richard Sanderson cover); "Monkey Hotel"	
Immortal Songs: Singing the Legend	March 18, 2017	South Korea	"My Day" (Yoon Jong-shin cover)	
Arirang TV I’m Live	April 7, 2017	South Korea	"Summer”; "Hong Kong”; "Jungle”; ”Tell Me"; "What’s Up?" (4 Non Blondes cover)	
Nanjang	May 2, 2017	South Korea	"The Secret of Hard Rock”; "Summer”; "Hong Kong”; ”Colorful"	
Immortal Songs: Singing the Legend	June 10, 2017	South Korea	"Unreasonable Reason" (Park Mi-kyung cover)	
Immortal Songs: Singing the Legend	June 17, 2017	South Korea	"Your Shadow" (Noh Sa-yeon cover)	
All That Music	July 20, 2017	South Korea	"Goodnight (Intro)”; "Summer”; "The Secret of Hard Rock”; "Hong Kong”; ”Wish"	
Immortal Songs: Singing the Legend	August 5, 2017	South Korea	"Don’t Mean Nothing” (Richard Marx cover)	
You Hee-yeol's Sketchbook	September 16, 2017	South Korea	"She"; "Summer”; "Reminiscence" (Kim Sung-ho cover with We Are The Night)	
Arirang TV I’m Live	November 24, 2017	South Korea	"The Secret of Hard Rock”	
All That Music in Wonju	November 29, 2017	South Korea	"Goodnight (Intro)”; "Summer”; "She”; "Tell Me”; ”Colorful"	
Arirang TV I’m Live	December 29, 2017	South Korea	"Baby I Need You”; "Goodnight (Intro)”; "Summer”; "She”; ”Tell Me"; "Colorful”	
All That Music	July 19, 2018	South Korea	"Goodnight (Intro)”; "Summer”; "The Secret of Hard Rock”; "She”; ”Jungle"	
Concert 7080	July 20, 2018	South Korea	"Long Lost Memories Loom Beyond the Window” (Kim Chang-wan cover); "Summer”	
All That Music X Indiestance	August 9, 2018	South Korea	"Goodnight (Intro)”; "Summer”; "She”; "Colorful”; ”Tell Me"	
Immortal Songs: Singing the Legend	August 11, 2018	South Korea	"Dream” (with Hwang Seok-jeong)	
You Hee-yeol's Sketchbook	August 25, 2018	South Korea	"Summer”; "Good Boy Twist"	
KBS Open Concert	September 9, 2018	South Korea	"Summer”; "In the Rain" (Lee Moon-sae cover)	
You Hee-yeol's Sketchbook	December 21, 2018	South Korea	"Christmas Is All Around" (Billy Mack cover); "All You Need Is Love" (The Beatles cover)	
KBS Open Concert	December 23, 2018	South Korea	"She”; "Happy Xmas (War Is Over)" (John & Yoko/The Plastic Ono Band cover)	
You Hee-yeol's Sketchbook	March 22, 2019	South Korea	"Legend"; "For Lovers Who Hesitate"	
Immortal Songs: Singing the Legend	April 13, 2019	South Korea	"For Love” (Kim Jong-hwan cover)	
Arirang TV I’m Live	May 17, 2019	South Korea	"Good Boy Twist”; "For Lovers Who Hesitate”; "Tell Me”; "Monkey Hotel”	
Immortal Songs: Singing the Legend	October 19, 2019	South Korea	"Viva la Vida” (Coldplay cover)	
KBS Open Concert	November 17, 2019	South Korea	"Legend"; "For Lovers Who Hesitate"	
You Hee-yeol's Sketchbook	February 28, 2020	South Korea	"I Will Give You Everything" (Lee Jang-hee cover); "On the Path”	
You Hee-yeol's Sketchbook	March 6, 2020	South Korea	"Good Good Night"; "Rain Falls When You Are Leaving" (Sanullim cover)	
Hangout with Yoo	March 28, 2020	South Korea	"For Lovers Who Hesitate"; "Summer"	
You Hee-yeol's Sketchbook	November 6, 2020	South Korea	"A Story I Couldn't See"; "A Thought on an Autumn Night"; "Make You Feel My Love" (Adele cover)	
KBS Open Concert	November 8, 2020	South Korea	"A Thought on an Autumn Night"; "Old Dog"; "Summer"	
Arirang TV I’m Live	November 12, 2020	South Korea	"Summer”; "For Lovers Who Hesitate”; "Old Dog”; "A Thought on an Autumn Night”; "Step”; "Sweet Memories”	
Legendary Stage Archive K	January 31, 2021 & February 7, 2021	South Korea	"Summer"; "Confession" (Delispice cover)	
Begin Again	December 29, 2020 & February 11, 2021	South Korea	"For Lovers Who Hesitate"; "Summer"; "A Thought on an Autumn Night"; "In the Rain" (Lee Moon-sae cover; "Creep" (Radiohead cover); "Because I Love You" (Yoo Jae-ha cover with Lee Hi)	
Legendary Stage Archive K	February 12, 2021	South Korea	"For Lovers Who Hesitate"	
MBC Stay-at-Home Concert (Note: The episode showed the highlights of the band's live concerts, Jannabi Fantastic Old-Fashioned Returns! (2019) and Nonsense II (2020).)	March 8, 2021	South Korea	"Opening + Surprise”; "Rocket”; "Good Boy Twist”; "Baby I Need You”; "Together!”; "Intro + Hong Kong”; "The Secret of Hard Rock”; "Guitar Solo + Legend”; "Bad Dreams”; "Summer”; "Good Good Night”; "For Lovers Who Hesitate”; "Tell Me”; "Colorful”; "Jungle”; "Bass + Drum Solos”; "What’s Up?" (4 Non Blondes cover); ”Blue Spring"; ”Dreams, Books, Power and Walls"	
Immortal Songs: Singing the Legend	May 29, 2021	South Korea	"Father” (Psy cover)	
You Hee-yeol's Sketchbook	July 30, 2021	South Korea	"Dreams, Books, Power, and Walls"; "I Know Where The Rainbow Has Fallen"	
KBS Open Concert	August 8, 2021	South Korea	"For Lovers Who Hesitate"; "I Know Where the Rainbow Has Fallen"; "Sweet Memories"	
You Hee-yeol's Sketchbook	August 13, 2021	South Korea	"Summer II"; "Time"	
Arirang TV I’m Live	August 19, 2021	South Korea	"A Ballad of Non Le Jon”; "Confession Show”; "The King of Romance”; "Time”; "I Know Where the Rainbow Has Fallen”; "Bluebird, Spread Your Wings!”	
Immortal Songs: Singing the Legend	March 19, 2022	South Korea	"Long Lost Memories Loom Beyond the Window” (Kim Chang-wan cover)	
You Hee-yeol's Sketchbook	May 13, 2022	South Korea	"Grippin'TheGreen"; "For Lovers Who Hesitate"; "Baby I Need You"; "What’s Up?" (4 Non Blondes cover)	
Immortal Songs: Singing the Legend	April 30, 2022	South Korea	"Alleyway” (Kim Hyun-sik cover)	
Arirang TV I’m Live	July 14, 2022	South Korea	"Ladybird"; "Grippin'TheGreen"; "Summer II”; "Summerfallwinter Spring."; "For Lovers Who Hesitate”	
Arirang TV I’m Live	July 16, 2022	South Korea	"Astearsgoby"; "Legend"; "The King of Romance”; "Summer”	
Immortal Songs Rock Festival in Gangneung (Note: The episode was held as a concert outdoors at Gyeongpo Provincial Park.)	August 6, 2022	South Korea	"Beautiful Woman” (Shin Joong-hyun cover); "Baby I Need You"; "Legend"; "For Lovers Who Hesitate"; "Oh! What A Shiny Night" (with Crying Nut); "It Must Have Been Love" (with YB)	
Korea on Stage: 600 Years of Open Roads	August 15, 2022	South Korea	"For Lovers Who Hesitate"; "Grippin'TheGreen"; "Bluebird, Spread Your Wings!"	
Hidden Singer	September 23, 2022	South Korea	"She"; "For Lovers Who Hesitate"; "Baby I Need You"; "Summer"	
Immortal Songs Romantic Holiday (Note: The episode was held as a concert outdoors in Uiseong County.)	November 12 & 19, 2022	South Korea	"Summer”; "A Thought on an Autumn Night"; "She"; "Reality" (Richard Sanderson cover); "Because I Love You" (Yoo Jae-ha cover with Bobby Kim); "Whistle" (Lee Moon-sae cover with Gummy)	
Begin Again	January 6 — February 10, 2023	South Korea	"Together!”; Because We Loved (orig. song by Kang Min-kyung and Choi Jung-hoon); "Yesterday" (The Beatles cover); "For Lovers Who Hesitate" (with Nell and John Park); "Time Walking on Memory" (with Nell); "Falling" (with John Park); "Long Lost Memories Loom Beyond the Window" (Sanullim cover with Lena Park)	
Immortal Songs Rock Festival in Ulsan (Note: The episode was held as a concert outdoors in Ulsan.)	August 12, 2023	South Korea	"Summer II”; "Baby I Need You"; "Laying Silk on My Heart" (Sanullim cover)	
2024 SBS Gayo Daejeon Summer (Note: The episode was the first summer edition of SBS Gayo Daejeon, held on July 21, 2024, at Inspire Arena, Incheon.)	July 26, 2024	South Korea	"Together!”; "Summer" (with Miyeon and Minnie from (G)I-dle)	
EBS Space Sympathy <We are SPACE RECORD:er> (Note: The episode was the 20th Anniversary special outdoor performance, held on August 10, 2024, at Nodeul Island Lawn.)	September 11, 2024	South Korea	"The Secret Of Hard Rock"; "Good Boy Twist"; "Together!”; "Baby I Need You"; "Hong Kong"; "Summer”; "Summer II"; "For Lovers Who Hesitate"; "Beautiful"; "Tell Me"; "See Your Eyes”	
Begin Again: After Dark (Note: The episode was a guerrilla busking at Sejong Lake Park and recorded on June 11, 2025.)	July 3 (YouTube) and July 5, 2025 (Broadcast)	South Korea	"Together!"; "Baby I Need You"; "Blue Spring"; "May the Tenderness Be With You!"; "Summer"; "For Lovers Who Hesitate"; "Hong Kong"; "Tell Me"; "Colorful"; "Jungle"; "What's Up"; "All the Boys and Girls Pt. 1: Birdman"; "dreams, books, power and walls"	
Mnet's Live Wire	July 4, 2025	South Korea	"Baby I Need You"; "For Lovers Who Hesitate"; "May the Tenderness Be With You!" (with Hanroro); "All the Boys and Girls Pt. 1: Birdman"; "dreams, books, power and walls"	
2025 SBS Gayo Daejeon Summer (Note: The episode was the second summer edition of SBS Gayo Daejeon, held on July 26, 2025 at KINTEX and broadcast on August 9.)	August 9, 2025	South Korea	"Flash”; "Pony”; "Our Night is More Beautiful Than Your Day" (Kona cover with Liz from Ive)	
80th Anniversary of Liberation Seoul Concert – We Are Korea (Note: The episode was held live at Seoul Plaza.)	August 15, 2025	South Korea	"Pony”; "For Lovers Who Hesitate”	
Immortal Songs 2025 Year-End Special - Family Vocal Competition (Note: The episode featured Jannabi and Choi Jung-joon, Choi Jung-hoon's brother & band manager, and they were declared as final winners.)	December 13, 2025	South Korea	"Prologue" (Shin Sung-woo cover)	
2025 KBS Song Festival Global Festival (Note: The festival was broadcast live from Songdo Convensia in Incheon.)	December 19, 2025	South Korea	"For Lovers Who Hesitate”; "May the Tenderness Be With You!"	

== Sporting events ==
List of sporting event performances, showing event names, dates, locations, and songs performed
Event/Venue	Date	City	Country	Performed song(s)	Ref.
K League 1 Jeonbuk Hyundai Motors vs. Ulsan HD Halftime show / Jeonju World Cup Stadium	May 31, 2025	Jeonju	South Korea	"Summer"; "For Lovers Who Hesitate"	
KBO 2025 All-Star Game / Daejeon Hanwha Life Ballpark	July 12, 2025	Daejeon	South Korea	"For Lovers Who Hesitate"; "Baby I Need You"; "Summer"	
Moonlight Series / Daegu Samsung Lions Park	May 16, 2026	Daegu	South Korea	"Blue spring"; "Baby I Need You"; "Chorus Night 2026, The Party Anthem Intro" + "Summer"; "Tell me"; "Colorful"; "For Lovers Who Hesitate"	
Jeonbuk Hyundai Motors Post-Match 'The 3rd Half' Concert / Jeonju World Cup Stadium	May 17, 2026	Jeonju	South Korea	"Blue Spring"; "Baby I Need You"; "pony"; "Summer"; "A thought on an autumn night"; "LEGEND"; "For Lovers Who Hesitate"; "GRIPPIN'THEGREEN"; "After School Activity"; "Tell me"; "Colorful"	

== Other live performances ==
List of miscellaneous live performances, dates, locations, and relevant information
Event	Date	Venue	City	Description	Ref.
Paradise of Jannabi	June 21, 2015	Lotte Department Store Culture Hall (Cheongnyang-ri Branch)	Seoul	Showcase performance	
What story should I tell you? Ep.9 Jannabi Concert	June 30, 2018	Jeonju Education and Culture Center	Jeonju	One-off performance	
Lifeplus X Sweep Live Field Sketch	October 19, 2018	Hanwha Fish Park, Hanwha Investment & Securities Headquarters	Seoul	Episode 6	
2018 Christmas Party 'Old City Warang Warang'	December 23, 2018	Chilsungro Outdoor Special Stage	Jeju	Year-end free-of-charge performance	
Seongnam International Medical Tourism Convention	September 20, 2019	Seongnam City Hall	Seongnam	One-off performance	
8th E-Daily WFesta 'W Concert'	October 10, 2019	Millennium Hilton Seoul	Seoul	Exclusive performance for E-Daily	
2019 Unicorn Concert	November 1, 2019	Yonsei University Open-air Theater	Seoul	Charity performance for startups co-headlined with the Astro, Victon, Ailee, and Oh Ha-young	
Gyeonggi Broadcasting Corporation 22nd Anniversary 2019 Year-end Concert	November 26, 2019	Gyeonggi Arts Center	Suwon	One-off performance	
Seoul National University Hospital, the Origin Mini Concert	October 14, 2022	Seoul National University Hospital	Seoul	Exclusive performance for the employees in celebration of the 137th anniversary of Jejungwon and the 44th anniversary of the incorporation of SNUH	
Studio Tomboy 45th Anniversary pop-up store x Jannabi Live Concert	November 18, 2022	Future Society, Seongsu-dong	Seoul	Exclusive performance as brand ambassador for Studio Tomboy	
PONY Photography Awards Ceremony	July 22, 2023	Hyundai Motorstudio Seoul	Seoul	Exclusive performance as brand ambassador for Hyundai's Heritage Project	
2024 E-Daily Job Creation Support Concert	February 16, 2024	COEX Auditorium	Seoul	Exclusive performance for E-Daily and 100 firefighters	
2024 Korea Festival in Manila	May 4, 2024	SM Mall of Asia	Pasay	Special guest for the opening ceremony of the festival in the Philippines	
New Samyang Festival	October 12, 2024	KINTEX	Goyang	Exclusive performance in celebration of Samyang Group's 100th anniversary	
2024 Bekseju House (Pop-up Store) Performance <Adult Hymn>	November 9-10, 2024	Ikseondong	Seoul	Exclusive performance as brand ambassador for Bekseju	
3rd Samsung Fire & Marine Insurance Healing Festa	November 15, 2024	Songdo Convensia	Incheon	Exclusive performance for Samsung Fire & Marine Insurance employees	
Hanhwa Insurance Festival 2025: RISING	March 22, 2025	KINTEX	Goyang	Exclusive performance for Hanwha Life Insurance employees	
2025 The Campus Begin Again	June 19, 2025	Incheon	Incheon	Exclusive performance for SK Hynix employees	
2025 The Campus Begin Again	June 19, 2025	Cheongju	Cheongju	Exclusive performance for SK Hynix employees	
ASML Korea Music Festival 2025	September 17-18, 2025	BEXCO	Busan	Exclusive performance for ASML employees	
