= Hunch =

Hunch may refer to:

- Hunch (Achime album), 2010 album by Achime
- Hunch (website), a collective intelligence decision making system
- Hunch, an intuitive reckoning
- Hunch, a forward bend in one's body, such as that from a crushed vertebra
- Hunch, a parody of Derryn Hinch played by Steve Vizard on Australian television show Fast Forward
- Hunch, a dance attributed to Hasil Adkins
- The Hunch Backs, a mountain in Hong Kong
- USS Hunch (SP-1197), a United States Navy patrol boat in commission from 1917 to 1918
