= Why Perish =

Studio album by No Respect for Beauty
- Released: 29 February 2012
- Genre: Post-rock
- Length: 49:44
- Label: Pastel

Why Perish is the debut studio album by South Korean post-rock band No Respect for Beauty. The album was released on 29 February 2012 through Pastel.

== Background ==
No Respect for Beauty gained popularity for their club performances and internet community, and in August 2011 they were named a Hello Rookie by The EBS space. The album is an instrumental album and has a simple composition of three instruments: guitar, bass, and drum.

== Critical reception ==
Music Y described the album as "Although there are no lyrics in the album, it is fully expressed and has the composition and style to avoid feeling burdened by the length of the song." Jeong Goowon of Weiv reviewed "What I felt in the band's debut album Why Perish was their strong presence to make it impossible to pass any part of the guitar, bass, or drum in vain. Nevertheless, the fact that the album was completed at a uniform density without breaking the balance means that the presence of each part is kept balanced by combining each other with tight tension within the album."

== Track listing ==
No.	Title	Length
1.	"Declaration of Existence"	4:15
2.	"The Walls Between Us"	8:13
3.	"Owls On the Ground"	5:25
4.	"Summit Collision"	8:37
5.	"Uncanny"	8:36
6.	"Day of Departure"	5:29
7.	"I Am a Shadow"	9:09
Total length:		49:44
