= Monni =

Monni may refer to:

- Monni (band), a South Korean rock band
- Carlo Monni, an Italian actor
