= Jisan Valley Rock Festival =

2009–2017 South Korean music festival

Valley Rock Festival
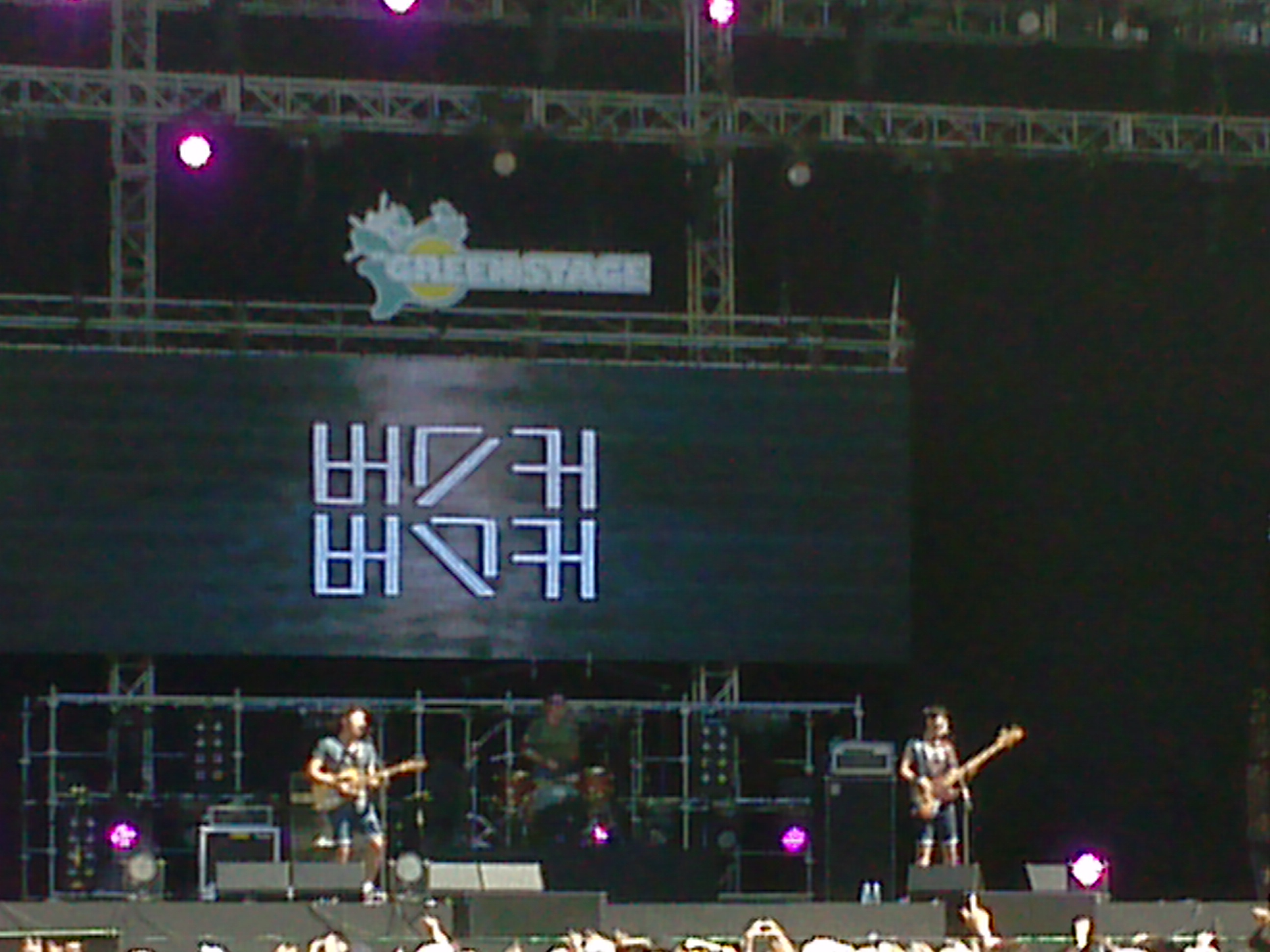
- Genre: Rock
- Dates: last weekend of July (3 days)
- Locations: Icheon, South Korea (2009–2012, 2016–present); Ansan, South Korea (2013, 2015)
- Years active: 2009–2017
- Website: Official webpage

Valley Rock Festival (also known as VRF, Jisan Valley Rock Festival and Ansan Valley Rock Festival) was held annually on the last weekend of July. Sharing many artists, the festival is arranged by 9 Ent, which is Smash Corporation, and in close coordination with Japanese Fuji Rock Festival. In 2009 on the festival's maiden year, there were some controversies regarding the festival's split from neighboring Pentaport Rock Festival. However the festival's sponsor changed to Mnet media in 2010 and CJ E&M in 2011. VRF has been successful and has grown into one of South Korea's biggest music festivals.

The festival was moved back to Jisan in 2016 and 2017, but was canceled in 2018. A festival was planned for 2019, but it was abruptly cancelled days before starting.

== Location ==
VRF is held at Jisan Valley Ski Resort, in Icheon, Gyeonggi Province, South Korea. So it had been called JVRF. The resort is in Icheon for the administrative district; however, it is closer to Yongin. In 2013 and 2015, the festival was held at Daebu Sea Breeze Theme Park located in Daebudo, Ansan, Gyeonggi Province, under the name Ansan Valley Rock Festival. The festival wasn't held in 2014.

== Festival grounds ==
There are three stages at the festival. The first stage is a Big Top Stage that is a main stage outside. Headliners perform on that stage. Another stage is a Green Stage that is smaller than the Big Top Stage. There is also an Open stage for amateur singers.

== Tickets ==
Tickets to the festival are restricted to four tickets per person. Ticket sales are divided into three phases. The first phase of ticket sales, called Early Bird, is without announcements. That sale is on the Internet usually starting in February. Headliners and other musicians are notified gradually until the third phase of ticket sales. They sell three days passes and day tickets. They do not sell day tickets at first and camping is not available for day tickets. There are also ticket booths on that day. Disabled people get discounts up to 50% off.

== Accommodation ==
Most people who stay at the festival camp in a tent.

== Organization (Events in Festival) ==
Catering, and some retail services are provided by various small companies, typically mobile catering vans, with food stalls on site. From 2010 on, people at the festival can only buy goods or food with T-money cards.

== History ==
=== 2009 ===
July 24 Apollo 18, Commonground, Copy Machine, Crash, Crying Nut, Fall Out Boy, Jimmy Eat World, Jun Jack and Highside, Pia, Starsailor, Straightener, T.A.Copy, Weezer.

July 25 The Airborne Toxic Event, Basement Jaxx, Deli Spice, Film Star, The Human Instinct, Johnnyroyal, Kim Chang-wan Band, Lee Han Choul and RunRunRunAways, Mate, Pidgeon Milk, Vassline, Vodka Rain, Windy City.

July 26 Asian Kung-Fu Generation, Bulnabang Star Sausage Club, Dr. Core 911, Gunamgwayeo Riding Stella, Jang Gi-ha and the Faces, Jet, Mongoose, Oasis, Patti Smith, Priscilla Ahn, Sister's Barbershop, Yozoh, Zitten.

=== 2010 ===
July 30 3rd Line Butterfly, Belle & Sebastian, Broccoli You Too?, Bulnabang Star Sausage Club, Diane Birch, Guckkasten, Lee Seung Yeol, Martina Topley-Bird, Massive Attack, Romantic Punch, Seoul Electric Band, Sugardonut, Vampire Weekend, Vesper DJ.

July 31 Apollo 18, Art Of Parties, Crash, Friction, Island City, Jang Gi-ha and the Faces, Matzka, Mutemath, Pet Shop Boys, Pia, Sister's Barbershop, Vanila Unity.

Aug 1 Achime, Corrine Bailey Rae, Galaxy Express, The Hiatus, Im Joo-yeon, Jaejoo Boys, Kula Shaker, The Moonshiners, Muse, Neons, Park Myeong-su w/ Infinite Challenge members and IU, Schizo, Taru, Third Eye Blind, toe,

=== 2011 ===
July 29 9mm Parabellum Bullet, Apollo 18, Atari Teenage Riot, The Chemical Brothers, Crash, DJ Doc, Envy, Gunamgwayeo Riding Stella, Huckleberry Finn, The Moonshiners, The Music, Nunddeugo Cobain, Quruli, Telepathy.

July 30 Asian Kung-Fu Generation, Arctic Monkeys, Banban Project, Bigmama, Daybreak, Dear Cloud, Feeder, Jaurim, Jung Won-young Band, The Koxx, One Ok Rock, Pia, Priscilla Ahn, SPYAIR, Taz, Thieves Like Us, Ukulele Picnic, Yellow Monsters, Zitten.

July 31 10cm, Amadou & Mariam, CSS, Deli Spice, Guckkasten, Incubus, Jang Gi-ha and Faces, Jeong Jinwoon, Jimmy Eat World, Kim Wan-Sun, Kingstone Rudieska, Monni, Ogre You Asshole, Schedule 1, Skawars, Suede, SKULL.

=== 2012 ===
July 27 Achime, Beat Burger, Black Bag, The Black Skirts, Common Ground, Daze47 w/ Brown Eyed Girls, Deulgukhwa, Elvis Costello and the Imposters, Glen Check, Hologram Film, James Iha, Kim Chang Wan Band, Loro's, Lowdown 30, M. Ward, NEGOTO, Peter Pan Complex, Radiohead.

July 28 Apollo 18, eAeon, HarryBigButton, Hollow Jan, Idiotape, James Blake, Juck Juck Grunge, Lee Juck, Lucid Fall, Monkey Beatz, Motion City Soundtrack, Owl City, Peppertones, Spyair, The Strikers, Taru, We Got Underwear And Lots Of Girls.

July 29 13 Steps, Beady Eye, Boom Boom Satellites, Busker Busker, [Champagne], Hanumpa, Jang Pil-sun, Los Lonely Boys, Monkeyz, Monni, Nell, Park Soyu, Sekai no Owari, Slowdown Channel, The Stone Roses, Yellow Monsters.

=== 2013 ===
July 26 18gram, 3rd Stone, Cat Power, The Cure, Daybreak, DIIV, Fantastic Drug Store, Lee Ji-hyung, M.I.B, Polyphonic Spree, Remnants Of The Fallen, Reflex, Roy Kim, The Solutions, Spring Summer Autumn And Winter, Vampire Weekend, Whowho, The xx.

July 27 3rd Line Butterfly, 9 And The Numbers, Achime, Asian Chairshot, Bulldog Mansion, Bullssazo, Dear Cloud, Galaxy Express, Han Hee-jung, Hologram Film, Lena Park, My Bloody Valentine, Nell, No.1 Korean, Pia, Primary & Zion.T & Yankee & Rhythm Power, The Ratios, Skrillex, Stereophonics.

July 28 2nd Moon, Coheed and Cambria, Commonground, Foals, fun., Guckkasten, Hurts, Idiotape, Moodsalon, Nine Inch Nails, Peppertones. Priscilla Ahn, Romantic Punch, Shaun(from The Koxx) & Born Kim, Steve Vai, TOKiMONSTA, Yoo Seung-woo.

== See also ==
- Media related to Jisan Valley Rock Festival at Wikimedia Commons
- List of music festivals in South Korea
