= Ha Hyun-woo =

South Korean musician (born 1981)

- 하현우
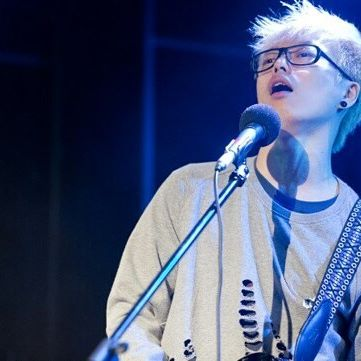
- Ha Hyun-woo with Guckkasten
- Born: Ha Hyun-woo; November 25, 1981 (age 44); Jangsu, North Jeolla Province, South Korea
- Occupation: Singer
- Musical career
- Genres: Rock; K-pop
- Instruments: Guitar; Piano
- Years active: 2001–present
- Label: Interpark Entertainment
- Member of: Guckkasten
- Website: Guckkasten; Twitter

Ha Hyun-woo (born November 25, 1981) is a South Korean singer-songwriter. He is the lead vocal and guitarist of the rock band Guckkasten.

== Early life ==
On November 25, 1981, Ha Hyun-woo was born in Jangsu, North Jeolla Province. He moved to Ansan, Gyeonggi Province at around age 7, where he spent his elementary, middle, and high school days. Throughout his youth, he tended to be introspective until middle school. His voice did not change drastically during puberty. As a result, he was able to produce high-pitched sounds with ease. Unfortunately, his time spent during his youth was rather unpleasant. He remembers his puberty as being a time of defeat, helplessness, and tearfulness. He held a self-image as an outsider, which had a deep influence on his self-esteem, even after passing through puberty. These experiences are an important and prominent theme in Guckkasten's music world, particularly in the first of their regular albums.

At the end of first grade in high school, Ha lost his girlfriend to his friend. He was greatly shocked and started singing, to change his impression. He practiced "She's Gone" hard for the high school festival. He got a good response, and he decided to work on music. Sadly, he did not study music formally because his father opposed him working on music.

On the other hand, Ha also liked to draw cartoons. Thanks to his mother who had dreamed of a painter, he was able to learn art when he was in high school, which was quite late. His father opposed art as well as music, but he eventually let Ha go to the college to study art. He quit music for a while after entering the university. Although his life in the university was short, his interest in art and aesthetics also became a driving force for image music in the future by forming a big axis in Guckkasten's music. He designed all of Guckkasten's albums himself.

== Music career ==
=== New Unbalance ===
New Unbalance was a band which was formed in 2001. The drummer Lee Jeong-gil, guitarist Jeon Kyu-ho (both members of Guckkasten), bassist Jina Ryu, keyboardist Lee Min-kyung were the group members. Ha Hyun-woo met the drummer Lee Jeong-gil in Daejeon, 2000, and they made the band a year after, within the other members. In 2003, Lee Min-kyung left the band and the other members invited a new keyboardist and changed the band name to the C.O.M.

=== The C.O.M. ===
The C.O.M., also as known as the Compass of Music, was formed in 2003. The members were mostly the previous member of the New Unbalance, with the new bassist Park Chul-young and keyboardist Lee In-kyung. The C.O.M. got the title "The Hidden Expert" in the Samzi Festival in 2003. However, due to military enlistment issues, the band did not last very long and with the end of the Samzi Festival stage, the team was disbanded. Ha Hyun-woo went to the military after the team disbanded.

=== Guckkasten ===
In 2007, the three members regrouped under the name Guckkasten in Gangwon Province, with the addition of Kim Ki-bum. In 2008, the band earned the Hello Rookie of June award by the EBS Space Sympathy. Guckkasten released their self-titled debut studio album "Guckkasten" on February 4, 2009. They held their first solo concert on February 21, 2009, in Seoul, South Korea, at Hongik University's V-Hall. Throughout that year, the band performed at several music festivals. The band was selected by the KCCA to usher in Korean culture into Japan and they won Rookie of the Year and Best Rock Song for "Mirror" at the seventh annual Korean Music Awards in 2010. They released their first Mini-Album 'Tagträume' on December 7, 2010. In 2011, Guckkasten performed at their first major music hall concert. The 2,000 tickets for the concert were sold out in ten days. Guckkasten made an appearance in the second season of I Am a Singer in 2012. They released their second studio album "Frame" on November 26, 2014.

=== King of Mask Singer ===
In 2016, Ha achieved the record of all-time longest-winning contestant of King of Mask Singer, serving as reigning king of the 22nd to 30th generations (equivalent to 18 consecutive broadcast weeks), as the "Music Commander in Town". During this run, he achieved an average of 68.22 out of 99 votes. As of 2025, his record has not been broken, but has been tied by Yun Min of TOUCHED (king of generations 215 to 223) and singer Jung Joon-il (king of generations 236 to 244)

| Date | Round | Song | Against | Votes |
|---|---|---|---|---|
| 2016.01.24 | 1st round | Saturday Night Fever | Park Ji-woo | 79 : 20 |
| 2016.01.31 | 2nd round | Freshwater Eel's Dream | Ahn Se-ha | 62 : 37 |
| 2016.01.31 | 3rd round | Lazenca, Save Us | Jun.K of 2 pm | 91 : 8 |
| 2016.01.31 | 22nd Mask King | All three songs above | Cha Ji-yeon | 77 : 22 |
| 2016.02.14 | 23rd Mask King | Don't Worry | Tei | 61 : 38 |
| 2016.02.28 | 24th Mask King | Fantastic Baby | Hani of EXID | 80 : 19 |
| 2016.03.13 | 25th Mask King | Don't Cry | Hyolyn of Sistar | 67 : 32 |
| 2016.03.27 | 26th Mask King | Spring Rain | Kim Bo-hyung of SPICA | 75 : 24 |
| 2016.04.10 | 27th Mask King | Hayeoga | Han Dong-geun | 78 : 21 |
| 2016.04.24 | 28th Mask King | An Invitation to Everyday Life | Kim Myung-hoon of Ulala Session | 53 : 46 |
| 2016.05.08 | 29th Mask King | Everyday I Wait for You | Yangpa | 66 : 33 |
| 2016.05.22 | 30th Mask King | One Million Roses | Kim Kyung-ho | 56 : 43 |
| 2016.06.05 | 31st Mask King | Very Long-Term couples | The One | 33 : 66 (Lose) |
| 2016.06.12 | Special Stage | Pulse | | |

== Discography ==
=== Extended plays ===
| Title | EP details | Peak chart positions | Sales |
| Title | EP details | KOR | Sales |
|---|---|---|---|
| Ithaca | Released: October 28, 2018; Label: Interpark Entertainment; Formats: LP, CD, digital download | 12 | KOR: 7,796 |
| Anti Ego | Released: March 25, 2022; Label: Interpark Entertainment; Formats: LP, CD, digital download | 39 | KOR: 1,341 |

=== Charted songs ===
| Title | Year | Peak chart positions | Sales | Album |
| Title | Year | KOR | Sales | Album |
|---|---|---|---|---|
| "Dream of Freshwater Eel" (민물 장어의 꿈) | 2016 | 29 | KOR: 102,184 | King of Mask Singer 62 |
| "Very Old Couples" (아주 오래된 연인들) | 2016 | 13 | KOR: 153,903 | King of Mask Singer 62 |
| "Lazenca, Save Us" | 2016 | 12 | KOR: 153,037 | King of Mask Singer 62 |
| "Invitation to Daily Life" (일상으로의 초대) | 2016 | 10 | KOR: 153,951 | King of Mask Singer 62 |
| "Shy Boy" (설레이는 소년처럼) | 2016 | 64 | KOR: 51,209 | Legend of the Blue Sea OST |
| "Diamond" (돌덩이) | 2020 | 4 | | Itaewon Class OST |
| "Doberman" (도베르만) | 2022 | — (Note: "Doberman" did not enter Gaon Digital Chart, but peaked 28 position on the Gaon Download Chart.) | | Military Prosecutor Doberman OST |
