= Yangbans =

South Korean indie rock band

- Also known as: Jun Bum Sun & the Yangbans
- Origin: Seoul, South Korea
- Genres: Indie rock
- Years active: 2013-present
- Label: Poclanos
- Members: Jun Bum Sun; Choi Seokho; Lee Jihoon; Park Cheonwook; Yoon Sungho; Moon Hak

Yangbans (Korean: 양반들) is a South Korean indie rock band. They used the band name Jun Bum Sun & the Yangbans (Korean: 전범선과 양반들) since they debuted in 2014, and changed their name to Yangbans from 2019. They released three studio albums: Love Songs (사랑가) (2014), Revolution Songs (혁명가) (2016) and Vagabond Songs (방랑가) (2017). Their Song Revolution (아래로부터의 혁명) won the Best Rock Song at the 2017 Korean Music Awards.

== Career ==
Jun Bum Sun & the Yangbans were formed in 2013. and they released their first studio album Love Songs (사랑가) in 2014, and at the time of their release, Jun Bum Sun was in the UK, to get his degree from the University of Oxford. In 2015, they were named Hello Rookie in The EBS space.

In 2016, they released their second album Revolution Songs (혁명가). The album is a concept album with a revolution theme, and the album was released the date for Donghak Peasant Revolution by Jeon Bong-jun, a Korean revolutionary. A few months after the album's release, the 2016 South Korean political scandal and 2016–2017 South Korean protests took place, and the tracks on his album beginning to gain significant attention. In an interview, Jun Bum Sun said "The albums released had no political intentions, but they took on a new meaning in time, and received good reviews from critics," about the situation at that time. The album's track Revolution (아래로부터의 혁명) won the Best Rock Song at the 2017 Korean Music Awards.

Jun Bum Sun joined the military in December 2016, and was discharged in 2018. In 2017, while he was serving in the military, the band's third album Vagabond Songs (방랑가) was released, which the rest of the members reportedly completed the songs he recorded before joining the military. They changed the band's name to Yangbans in 2019. In 2023, they released a new EP New Moon.

== Discography ==
=== Studio albums ===
- Love Songs (사랑가) (2014)
- Revolution Songs (혁명가) (2016)
- Vagabond Songs (방랑가) (2017)
- Hymns from the Dragon Lake (2024)

=== EPs ===
- Exit (2019)
- Wind & Flow (바람과 흐름) (2022)
- Eruhwa (에루화) (2023)
- New Moon (2023)
