= Airy (musician) =

South Korean indie pop musician

- Born: Seoul, South Korea
- Genres: Indie pop, psychedelic pop
- Years active: 2018-present
- Label: Poclanos

Airy (Korean: 애리) is a South Korean indie pop musician. She has released her studio album, B,U.D (2025).

== Career ==
Airy was born and lived in Seoul. She made her debut in 2018 on EP Seeds. Music Y described her as "The birth of a rookie with a very large seed" and ranked her at first place in 2018 Rookie of the Year. She won the Rookie of the Year at the 2019 Korean Music Awards.

She took the final stage at the 2019 EBS Hello Rookie Contest and won the grand prize. In 2020, she released the single Virtual Song. She participated We, Do It Together, a compilation album by female rock musicians in Korea.

In 2023, she released a collaboration single Soulful Energy Exchange with Livigesh and Velvet Dust.

In 2025, she released her first studio album, B,U.D. The name of the album means "broken, unapt. dazzle."

== Discography ==
=== Studio albums ===
- B,U.D (2025)

=== EPs ===
- Seeds (2018)
