= Yaya Kim =

South Korean art pop solo project

- Also known as: Yaya
- Origin: Seoul, South Korea
- Genres: Art pop; jazz
- Years active: 2009-present
- Labels: Pastel; Mirrorbal Music
- Members: Yaya (Kim Eunji)
- Past members: Siya (Lee Yongjin)

Yaya Kim (Korean: 야야 킴) is a South Korean art pop solo project of South Korean singer-songwriter Yaya (Kim Eunji). The band began as a duo of Yaya and Siya from 2009, and after the release of their first studio album, Siya left the band and the band became Yaya's solo project. Yaya released Circus (곡예) (2011) and Cruel Picture (잔혹영화) (2013), and later changed her name to Yaya Kim and released her third studio album a.k.a YAYA (2022).

== History ==
Kim Eunji tried to start her musical career by signing a contract with a musical entertainment when she was in high school, but her debut fell through as her disagreement with the entertainment was not closed. She said in an interview about the situation at the time, "The boss tried to make me Korean Avril Lavigne, but I wanted to be Korean Marilyn Manson." She met Lee Yongjin at a music festival in 2009, and he offered her an indie band. Later, they formed a band under the stage names Yaya and Siya.

The band gained popularity since they topped the EBS Hello Rookie Contest in 2010. They released their first studio album Circus (곡예) in 2011 and had a solo concert. They appeared on KBS's band programme Top Band 2 in 2012.

Prior to the release of the second album, Siya left the band, which became Yaya's solo project. She released her second studio album Cruel Picture (잔혹영화) in 2013. She interviewed the album as "I am easily hurt, but I am not good at expressing emotions. So I wanted to release the pent-up emotions in me through music."

In 2016, she released the single Beauty is clumsy (미녀는 서툴러) and the EP Scarlet Shoes. She changed the name to Yaya Kim in 2022, and released her third album a.k.a YAYA.

== Discography ==
=== Studio albums ===
- Circus (곡예) (2011)
- Cruel Picture (잔혹영화) (2013)
- a.k.a YAYA (2022)

=== EPs ===
- Scarlet Shoes (2016)
