= Revolution Songs =

Studio album by Jun Bum Sun & the Yangbans
- Released: 21 March 2016
- Genre: Indie rock
- Length: 40:06
- Label: Dr. Simpson Company, Dooroomi Records

Jun Bum Sun & the Yangbans chronology
Love Songs (2014)	Revolution Songs (2016)	Vagabond Songs (2017)

Revolution Songs (Korean: 혁명가; RR: Hyeokmyeongga) is the second studio album by South Korean rock band Jun Bum Sun & the Yangbans. The album was released on 21 March 2016, the day for Donghak Peasant Revolution by Jeon Bong-jun. The track of the album Revolution (아래로부터의 혁명') won the Best Rock Song at the 2017 Korean Music Awards.

== Background ==
The album was made when Jun Bum Sun lived in the UK to attend University of Oxford, and he said he was inspired by it around the time he studied the American Revolution and the French Revolution. The album is a concept album with a revolution and love theme influenced by Jeon Bong-jun, and there is a picture of Jun Bum Sun with a sangtu on the album cover. The album received great attention due to the 2016 South Korean political scandal and 2016–2017 South Korean protests that took place a few months later. In an interview, Jun Bum Sun said that the revolution and lyrics of his album are "perfect coincidences."

== Critical reception ==
Professional ratings
Review scores
Source	Rating
IZM	4/5 stars

Ko Jongseok of Music Y described the album as a valuable work and a great prop that was prepared and completed for this very moment and armed the public with music for the next time. Na Wonyoung of Weiv said "Their second album Revolution Songs, which is an extension of the Love Songs, tells the unique concept of "Joseon Rock-Kn Roll" of a revolution from below caused by the people of the late Joseon Dynasty."

== Track listing ==
No.	Title	Length
1.	"The Face in the Mist" ("안개 속 뱃사공")	1:54
2.	"Revolution" ("아래로부터의 혁명")	4:13
3.	"Fire" ("불놀이야")	3:56
4.	"Monster" ("도깨비")	2:52
5.	"Moondance" ("강강술래")	5:00
6.	"Joan of Arc" ("난세의 영웅")	3:13
7.	"Seventh of July" ("칠석") (featuring Seokyeong)	5:13
8.	"Friends and Lovers" ("벗님")	3:57
9.	"The Cloud Dream of the Nine" ("구운몽")	6:39
10.	"Midnight Run" ("보쌈")	3:09
