= No Respect for Beauty =

South Korean post-rock band

- Origin: Seoul, South Korea
- Genres: Post-rock
- Years active: 2010-present (on hiatus)
- Labels: Pastel
- Members: Choi Joonseok; Kim Hanshin; Lee Hyeonghoon
- Past members: Choi Wooyoung

No Respect for Beauty (Korean: 노 리스펙트 포 뷰티) is a South Korean post-rock band. The band currently consists of Choi Joonseok, Kim Hanshin and Lee Hyeonghoon. Since their formation in 2010, the band has released a studio album Why Perish (2012).

== Career ==
No Respect for Beauty was formed in August 2010. They began to gain popularity in 2011 when they appeared on EBS Hello Rookie Contest.

Their first studio album Why Perish was released in 2012. Music Y described the album as "The album doesn't have lyrics, but it's fully expressed, and it has the composition and style that doesn't burden the length of the song", and they were named the third best rookie of 2012. They appeared on KBS 2 TV's programme Topband 2.

Afterwards, they began a national tour, but with the withdrawal of bassist Choi Woo-young, they went on hiatus. In 2014, new bassist Lee Hyeonghoon joined the band. They performed at the comeback solo concert and the Pentaport Rock Festival.

No Respect for Beauty has not been active since 2014, but they are considered one of the most representative Korean post-rock bands in terms of performance. Na Wonyoung of Weiv described the band as "Even if you play a very restrained performance without an emotional explosion, No Respect for Beauty is enough to achieve enthusiasm and spectacle with only a balanced combination and great composition." Jang Eunjin of Indiepost introduced their song I Am a Shadow as the best South Korean post-rock instrumental song, saying, "It's a song that awakens the sense that the melody strongly touches and strokes every corner of the body with explosive images."

== Discography ==
=== Studio albums ===
- Why Perish (2012)
