= Apollo 18 (band) =

South Korean indie rock band

- Origin: Ilsan, Gyeonggi-do, South Korea
- Genres: Post-rock, post-hardcore
- Years active: 2008-present
- Labels: Estella Records / GMC Records
- Members: 김대인 Daeinn Kim (bass) 최현석 Hyunseok Choi (guitar) 이상윤 Sangyun Lee (drums)
- Website: Official Site

Apollo 18 (Korean: 아폴로18) is a South Korean indie rock trio formed in June 2008 by Daeinn Kim (김대인), Hyunseok Choi (최현석), and Sangyun Lee (이상윤).

Apollo 18 won the EBS Hello Rookie Contest grand prize for South Korea's most promising young act of 2009, and the "Rookie of the Year" award at the 2010 Korean Music Awards.

== History ==
- 2008 - Formation
- 2009 - [Red] Album Release
- 2009 - [Blue] Album Release
- 2009 - Pentaport Rock Festival
- 2009 - Jisan Valley Rock Festival
- 2009 - EBS Space Gong-Gam, Hello Rookie of August
- 2009 - Best New Indie Musician selected by Korea Creative Content Agency (Kocca)
- 2009 - Zankyo Record 5th ANNIVERSARY Festival
- 2009 - 2009 EBS Hello Rookie Awards, Grand Prize
- 2010 - [Red](extended edition) & [Violet] Album Release
- 2010 - Korean Music Award, Rookie Awad
- 2010 - TV Show : invitation to the trance' exclusively at EBS Space Gong Gam
- 2010 - Green Plugged Festival
- 2010 - First Exclusive Concert in Korea 'No Human'
- 2010 - Nationwide Tour in Korea
- 2010 - Jisan Valley Rock Festival (Seoul, Korea)
- 2010 - Exclusive Concert in Jeju Island
- 2010 - EBS Hello Rookie Awards
- 2011 - SXSW (Texas, US)
- 2011 - Jisan Valley Rock Festival
- 2011 - Fuji Rock Festival (Niigata, Japan)
- 2011 - Stepping Stone Festival (Jeju Island, Korea)
- 2011 - Beastie Rock Festival (Taipei, Taiwan)
- 2011 - [BLACK] EP Album Release
- 2012 – 2nd Exclusive Concert 'Apollo 18 in Blackhole'
- 2012 – 2012 Korean Music Awards, Nominated Best Rock 'Sonic Boom'
- 2012 – Red, Blue, Violet Series Album Reissue
- 2012 – MTV Iggy Artist of the Week
- 2012 – Blonde Redhead Live in Korea's Opening Guest
- 2012 – Jisan Valley Rock Festival (Seoul, Korea)
- 2012 – Pop Montreal Festival & Canada Tour (Toronto/Ottawa/Montreal, Canada)
- 2013 – Liverpool Sound City (Liverpool, UK)
- 2013 – Focus Wales (Wales, UK)
- 2013 – CITYBREAK (Seoul, Korea)
- 2013 – V-ROX Festival (Vladivostok, Russia)
- 2013 – Beastie Rock Festival (Taipei, Taiwan)
- 2013 – Canal Kylin International Music Festival (Beijing, China)
- 2015 – Sound of the Xity (Beijing, China)
- 2015 – Strawberry Music Festival (Shanghai, China)

== Discography ==
- The Red Album – debut EP (2009)
- [0] / The Blue Album (2009)
- Red (enhanced reissue) (2010)
- The Violet Album – EP (2010)
- The Black Album – EP (2011)
