= Hunch (Achime album) =

Studio album by Achime
- Released: June 3, 2010
- Genre: Indie rock
- Length: 43:41
- Label: BGBG Records

Achime chronology
Flower of Lie (2009)	Hunch (2010)	Overcome (2012)

Hunch is the debut studio album by South Korean indie rock band Achime. The album was released on 3 June 2010.

== Background ==
After the 2009 EP 거짓말꽃 (Flower of Lie), Achime worked on their first studio album, describing Hunch and Flower of Lie as "They are albums that talk about emotions felt in the heart through things that are hard to experience in everyday life: the flow of everyday life, the visible, the audible. On the contrary" They recorded for two and a half months in a studio under construction in Sindaebang-dong. The band said "We hope everyone who listens to music can have a 'heart-warming experience'." in an introduction to the album.

== Critical reception ==
Professional ratings
Review scores
Source	Rating
IZM	3.5/5 stars
Weiv	6/10

Lee Geonsoo of IZM reviewed "Kwon Seonwook's nervous voice with full of irritation, is reminiscent of Shannon Hoon of Blind Melon, who died of drug overdose in 1999." Choi Minwoo of Weiv said "The album is regrettable that their records clearly list their influences, but their originality is not clear. But some moments are thrilling."

== Track listing ==
No.	Title	Length
1.	"Future at the Opposite Side" ("맞은편 미래")	3:55
2.	"Pathetic Sight"	4:40
3.	"Inexressive Step" ("무표정한 발걸음")	4:16
4.	"Fireworks" ("불꽃놀이")	4:00
5.	"Signal Show"	3:36
6.	"After this Rain Stops" ("이 비가 그친 뒤")	3:50
7.	"Wave Colored Shoes" ("파도색 신발")	3:07
8.	"Unbelievers" ("불신자들")	4:23
9.	"Flower of Lie" ("거짓말꽃")	3:26
10.	"Day After Day" ("매일매일")	4:36
11.	"I Dislike Coffee" ("커피는 싫어요") (featuring Deokwon of Broccoli, You Too?)	3:52
