= Achime =

South Korean indie rock band

- Origin: South Korea
- Genres: Indie rock; alternative rock
- Years active: 2008-present
- Labels: Beatball, BGBG Records
- Members: Kwon Seonwook; Kim Sooyeol; Lee Sangkyu; Kim Kyeongjoo; Kim Jeongmin
- Past members: Kim Donghyeon; Park Seonyoung; Jeong Wookjae

Achime (Korean: 아침) is a South Korean indie rock band. The band currently consists of Kwon Seonwook, Kim Sooyeol, Lee Sangkyu, Kim Kyeongjoo and Kim Jeongmin. Since their formation in 2008, the band has released two studio albums Hunch (2010) and Overcome (2012).

== Career ==
Achime was formed in 2008, Kwon Seonwook offered a band to Kim Sooyeol to do music after his discharge, and Jeong Wookjae and Park Seonyoung later joined the band. They began to gain popularity through auditions in MySpace Korea. They released their EP Flower of Lie (거짓말꽃) in 2009.

In 2010, they released their first studio album Hunch. The album was recorded for two and a half months, and they recorded in a recording studio under construction. Kwon Seonwook interviewed in the situation, "We weren't in proper condition while recording." They have appeared in The EBS space and performed at the Pentaport Rock Festival and Jisan Valley Rock Festival.

They released EP Hyperactivity in 2011 and had a solo concert in May. They released their second studio album Overcome in 2012. Kim Banya of IZM described the album as "The album maintains its "pessimistic," but refuses to express it in one pattern, and it does not like it being defined as a single genre, so it combines various attempts." In 2013, they released the single Swtsxtn, but their sensational image album cover became controversial.

The band then went on hiatus until 2017. Since then, they have released the singles Hide and Seek (숨바꼭질) (2017), Moratorium (2019), God's App (2021) and Portrait (2022).

== Discography ==
=== Studio albums ===
- Hunch (2010)
- Overcome (2012)

=== EPs ===
- Flower of Lie (거짓말꽃) (2009)
- Hyperactivity (2011)
