= Guckkasten =

South Korean indie rock band

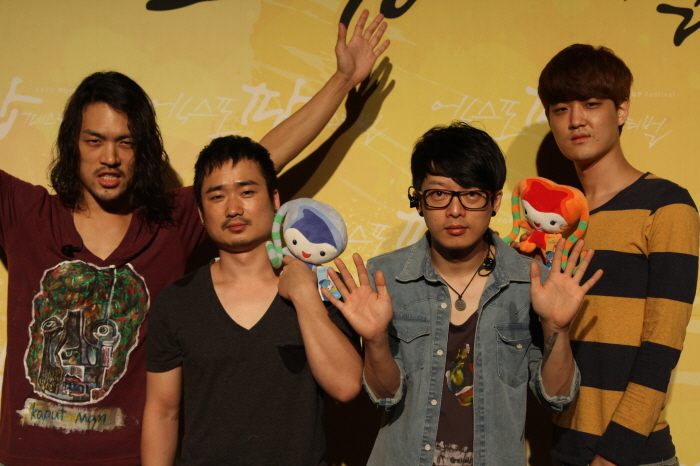
- Guckkasten in 2014

Background information
- Also known as: The C.O.M.
- Origin: Seoul, South Korea
- Genres: Rock
- Years active: 2003–present
- Labels: Ruby Salon/Mirrorball (2008-2010); Yedang/LOEN (2012-2014); Interpark INT/Windmill (2014-present)
- Members: Ha Hyun-woo; Jeon Kyu-ho; Lee Jung-gil; Kim Ki-bum
- Past members: Kim Jin-eok
- Website: guckkasten.kr

Guckkasten (Korean: 국카스텐) is a South Korean indie rock band. Formed in 2003 under the name The C.O.M. (더 컴), the original lineup consisted of vocalist Ha Hyun-woo, guitarist Jeon Kyu-ho, drummer Lee Jung-gil, and bassist Kim Jin-eok. Due to conscription, The C.O.M. disbanded. In 2007, they regrouped with Kim Ki-bum as bassist under the name Guckkasten, which is the German word for Zograscope. The band intends to make music with psychedelic images hidden under analogous art.

== History ==
In 2000, Ha Hyun-woo and Lee Jung-gil met while attending the same university. The following year, Jeon Kyu-ho, who earned a crane operation license at the time, was found through the internet. The band was founded in the Hongdae area of Seoul with the name The C.O.M., an acronym for Compass of Music, in 2003. Due to their conscription, the band was dismantled.

In 2007, the three members regrouped under the name Guckkasten in the Gangwon-do Province, with the addition of Kim Ki-bum. The name "Guckkasten" is derived from the German language, which translates to "Chinese-style kaleidoscope". The band chose the name because they wanted to "show off a never-ending, fire-work like image of the passion of the young and the mirage of life". Initially, Guckkasten attempted to create an independent record label themselves. After negotiations, they were signed a three-year recording contract with Yedang Entertainment. In 2008, the band won the grand prize by the EBS Hello Rookie Contest.

Guckkasten released their self-titled debut studio album on February 4, 2009. They held their first solo concert on February 21, 2009, in Seoul, South Korea, at Hongik University's V-Hall. Throughout that year, the band performed at several music festivals, including the Summer Rock Festival in Shanghai, China, the Pentaport Rock Festival, and Jisan Valley Rock Festival in July.

The band was selected by the Korea Creative Content Agency (KCCA) to usher in Korean culture into Japan. The hard disk drive where original album was saved had been lost by the band, which required them to re-record the album. As a result, Guckkasten lost all their money, which left them "speechless for about three seconds when we got the bill". Guckkasten won Rookie of the Year and Best Rock Song for "Mirror" at the seventh annual Korean Music Awards in 2010. In March 2010, Guckkasten performed a "special stage" at Mnet's music chart television program M Countdown with girl group Kara.

In 2011, Guckkasten performed at their first major music hall concert. The event, which seats 2,000 people, sold out tickets in ten days. They were also a feature on hip hop duo's Leessang's album Asura Balbalta.

== Musical style and artistry ==
Guckkasten's music has been classified as psychedelic rock, a genre that is underrepresented in South Korea. Due to their experimental nature, Guckkasten has expressed they can not define the sound of their music. The band has stated that their guitar riffs tend to be "on the heavy side".

The band's intent is to create music with psychedelic images hidden under analogous art. The band members cite different musicians as their favorites: Ha Hyun-woo chose Gotan Project and Arcade Fire; Jeon Kyu-ho chose Steve Vai and Joe Satriani; Lee Jung-kil admires Metallica's drummer Lars Ulrich; Kim Ki-bum chose Red Hot Chili Peppers's bassist Flea.

Guckkasten has been described as having developed a unique sound and that the band strives for "musical perfection". Jeong Ho-jae, a writer for News Donga, felt that Guckkasten created "explosive and creative" music. Vocalist Ha Hyun-woo's singing technique has also been described to be "explosive". Their self-titled debut album received critical acclaim and was credited for the development and rapid growth of Korean indie music.

=== Performance ===
At their 2011 Guckkasten Visual Art Concert, the band employed three-dimensional effects, which displayed different items on the screens behind them for each individual track they performed. They aimed to combine their "intense" rock music with a visual exhibition.

== Members ==
Current members

- Ha Hyun-woo (하현우) – vocals, guitar
- Jeon Kyu-ho (전규호) – guitar
- Lee Jung-gil (이정길) – drums
- Kim Ki-bum (김기범) – bass guitar

Former members

- Kim Jin-eok (김진억) – bass guitar

== Discography ==
=== Studio albums ===
Title	Album details	Peak chart positions	Sales
Title	Album details	KOR	Sales
Guckkasten	Released: February 4, 2009; Re-released: April 20, 2010; Label: Ruby Salon Records; Formats: CD, digital download	—	
Frame	Released: November 26, 2014; Label: Interpark INT; Formats: CD, digital download	6	KOR: 11,930
Aurum	Released: September 18, 2025; Label: Interpark; Formats: CD, digital download	34	KOR: 4,134

=== Compilation albums ===
Title	Album details	Peak chart positions	Sales
Title	Album details	KOR	Sales
Time After Time Selection	Released: December 27, 2012; Label: Yedang Company; Formats: CD, digital download	3	KOR: 2,774

=== Extended plays ===
Title	EP details	Peak chart positions	Sales
Title	EP details	KOR	Sales
Tagträume	Released: December 7, 2010; Label: Ruby Salon Records; Formats: CD, digital download	—	
Stranger	Released: November 15, 2017; Label: Interpark INT; Formats: CD, digital download	8	KOR: 11,194

=== Singles ===
Title	Year	Peak chart positions	Sales	Album
Title	Year	KOR	Sales	Album
"Mirror" (거울)	2008	—		Guckkasten
"Red" (붉은 밭)	2010	—		Tagträume
"Montage" (몽타주)	2012	58	KOR: 109,455	Frame
"Infection" (감염)	2014	—		Frame
"Transformation" (변신)	2014	—		Frame
"Thief" (도둑)	2015	—		Non-album singles
"Pulse"	2016	24	KOR: 78,736	Non-album singles
"Stranger" (이방인)	2017	—		Stranger
"Hunt" (사냥)	2019	—		Non-album singles
"Your Name"	2019	—		Non-album singles

== Awards ==
Year	Nominee / work	Award	Result
2003	The C.O.M.	Samzi Sound Festival for Hidden Whiz Award	Won
2007	Guckkasten	Samzi Sound Festival for Hidden Whiz Award	Won
2008	Guckkasten	EBS Space Sympathy for Hello Rookie of June	Won
2008	Guckkasten	Samzi Sound Festival Murim Whiz Award	Won
2008	Guckkasten	EBS Space Sympathy Grand Award for Hello Rookie of the Year	Won
2010	Guckkasten	7th Korean Music Awards for Rookie of the Year	Won
2010	Mirror (거울; Geoul)	7th Korean Music Awards for Best Rock Song Award	Won
2016	Ha Hyun-woo (King of Mask Singer)	43rd Korean Broadcasting Grand Prize for Musician Category	Won
2016	Ha Hyun-woo (King of Mask Singer)	16th MBC Entertainment Awards for Special Award	Won
2016	Ha Hyun-woo	Korea Brand Of The Year Award	Won
2016	Ha Hyun-woo	8th Melon Music Awards Rock Category	Won
2020	Guckkasten	Brand Customer Loyalty Awards for Rock band	Won
