= Daybreak (band) =

South Korean rock band

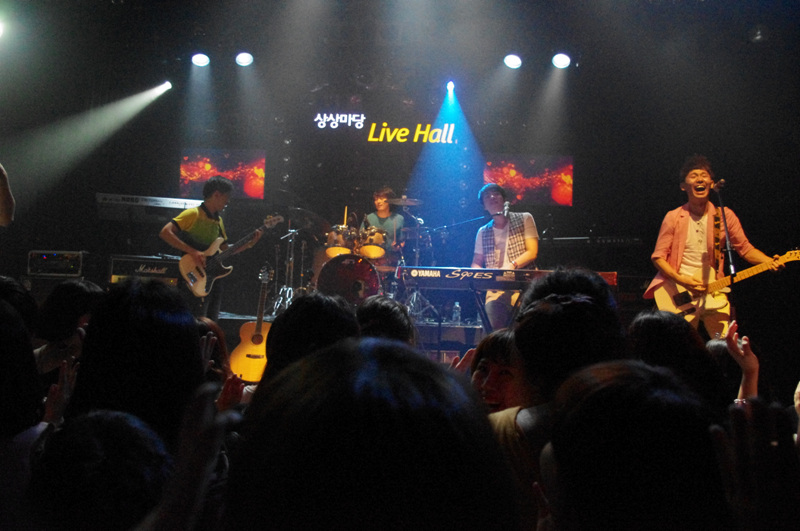

Background information
- Origin: Seoul, South Korea
- Genres: pop rock; Indie rock; modern rock
- Years active: 2007–present
- Labels: Seoul Records; Happy Robot Records; Mystic Story
- Members: Lee Won-suk; Jung Yu-jong; Kim Sun-il; Kim Jang-won
- Website: club.cyworld.com/band-db

Daybreak (Korean: 데이브레이크) is a South Korean rock band formed in 2007. They debuted on September 18, 2007, with the studio album Urban Life Style.

Daybreak are part of the lineup for the Grand Mint Festival 2020 which is scheduled to take place on October 24–25, 2020 at Olympic Park in Seoul, South Korea.

== Members ==
- Lee Won-suk (이원석) — Vocals
- Jung Yu-jong (정유종) — Guitar
- Kim Sun-il (김선일) — Bass
- Kim Jang-won (김장원) — Keyboard
- Hong Jun (홍준) — Drums (Guest member)

== Discography ==
=== Studio albums ===
Title	Album details	Peak chart positions	Sales
Title	Album details	KOR	Sales
Urban Life Style	Released: September 18, 2007; Label: Seoul Records; Formats: CD, digital download; Track listing: 1. Intro; 2. Urban Life Style; 3. Man (사나이) (Original Ver.); 4. Bumper Car (범버카); 5. Dazed (July Rain) (멍하니 (7월의 비)); 6. Like an Indian Doll (인디언 인형처럼); 7. Photo (사진); 8. Short Hair (단발머리); 9. Do It! (Duet With Maya); 10. Apology Letter (반성문); 11. 사나이 (Bossanova Ver.); 12. 사나이 (Adult Ver.); 13. 사나이 (Inst.)	—	—
Aurora	Released: August 5, 2010; Label: Happy Robot Records, NHN Entertainment; Formats: CD, digital download; Track listing: 1. Aurora (새벽의 빛); 2. Fantasy; 3. Love Actually (들었다 놨다); 4. Grown Hair (머리가 자란다); 5. Immortal Summer (불멸의 여름); 6. Turnaround; 7. Autumn Again (가을, 다시); 8. Melody In a Dream (꿈 속의 멜로디); 9. Rock & Roll Mania; 10. I Don't Know (에라 모르겠다); 11. A Song That The World Sings (세상이 부르는 노래)	—	—
Spaceensum	Released: April 17, 2012; Label: Happy Robot Records, NHN Entertainment; Formats: CD, digital download; Track listing: 1. Two Hearts (두 개의 심장); 2. SILLY; 3. Merry-Go-Round (회전목마); 4. After A Long Time (오랜만에); 5. da capo 6. Calmly (담담하게); 7. Sunny Sunny; 8. Monotrain (모노 트레인); 9. My Dream, My Life, My Love; 10. Tap Dance; 11. Put Down (내려놓다); 12. Mr.Rolling Stone (Bonus Track); 13. Shall We Dance? (Bonus Track)	—	—
With	Released: June 14, 2016; Label: Happy Robot Records, NHN Entertainment; Formats: CD, digital download; Track listing: 1. Song Name (곡명); 2. Alone; 3. Set Fire To The Heart (그대 맘에 불을 지펴 줄게요); 4. Only Walk The Flower Road (꽃길만 걷게 해줄게); 5. Mellow; 6. Peacefully Tonight (오늘 밤은 평화롭게); 7. Save Me (살려줘요); 8. Waltz In a Maze (미로 속의 왈츠); 9. Love Me; 10. Knock Knock (똑똑); 11. LITMUS; 12. Spotlight; 13. WITH	11	KOR: 2,397

=== Live albums ===
Title	Album details	Peak chart positions	Sales
Title	Album details	KOR	Sales
Daybreak Live Summer Madness 2015: The Strings	Released: October 12, 2015; Label: Happy Robot Records, NHN Entertainment; Formats: CD, digital download	—	—

=== Extended plays ===
Title	Album details	Peak chart positions	Sales
Title	Album details	KOR	Sales
New Day	Released: January 19, 2010; Label: Happy Robot Records, NHN Entertainment; Formats: CD, digital download; Track listing: 1. Honey Delivery; 2. Good (좋다); 3. Urban Life Style (New Day Ver.); 4. 사진 (New Day Ver.); 5. 범퍼카 (New Day Ver.)	—	—
Cube	Released: July 22, 2014; Label: Happy Robot Records, NHN Entertainment; Formats: CD, digital download; Track listing: 1. Waterfall; 2. Hot Fresh; 3. Touch Me (2014 Remaster); 4. 앞집여자 (2014 Remaster); 5. Someday	—	—

=== Singles ===
Title	Year	Peak chart positions	Sales (DL)	Album
Title	Year	KOR	Sales (DL)	Album
"Good" (좋다)	2010	—	—	New Day
"Love Actually" (들었다 놨다)	2010	—	—	Aurora
"Mr. Rolling Stone"	2011	—	—	Spaceensum
"Shall We Dance?"	2011	—	—	Spaceensum
"Silly"	2012	—	KOR: 32,806	Spaceensum
"Touch Me"	2013	59	KOR: 27,147	Cube
"Young Woman" (앞집여자)	2013	96	KOR: 21,371	Cube
"Hot Fresh"	2014	—	KOR: 18,327	Cube
"Beautiful People" (빛나는 사람)	2015	—	—	Non-album single
"I Will Fire On Your Mind" (그대 맘에 불을 지펴 줄게요)	2015	—	—	With
"Mellow"	2016	—	—	With
"Only Walk The Flower Road" (꽃길만 걷게 해줄게)	2016	—	KOR: 18,327	With
"Peacefully Tonight" (오늘 밤은 평화롭게)	2016	—	—	With
"Why Not?" (왜안돼?)	2017	—	KOR: 18,060	Non-album singles
"We Fit Well" (우린 제법 잘 어울려요)	2017	—	—	Non-album singles
"—" denotes releases that did not chart.

=== Collaborations ===
Year	Title	Other artist(s)
2012	"One More Step" (한 걸음 더)	Yoon Sang
2013	"Love Actually" (들었다 놨다)	Sunny Hill

=== Soundtrack appearances ===
Year	Title	Other artist(s)
2013	"Sad Mannequin" (슬픈마네킹)	Must Era Of The Band OST
2016	"Spotlight"	Courage to be Disliked eBook OST
2016	"Our Gap-soon" (우리 갑순이)	Our Gap-soon OST
2017	"Mellow"	Dr. Romantic OST
