= The EBS space =

South Korean music television program

- Genre: Music
- Country of origin: South Korea
- Original language: Korean

Production
- Running time: 50 minutes

Original release
- Network: EBS
- Release: April 3, 2004 – present

Related
- EBS Hello Rookie Contest

The EBS space (Korean: EBS 스페이스 공감) is a South Korean music program broadcast by EBS. The first broadcast began in 2004, and it is broadcasting for 50 minutes every Friday from midnight in KST. It is a music program that holds a music concert at the EBS headquarters for four days every Monday to Thursday and processes the live performance, coverage, and interviews. It is a program in which performers are selected based on musicality and live capabilities and a performance without an MC. In recognition of its contribution to Korean popular music, it won a Committee Choice Special Award at the Korean Music Awards in 2007, and won the Cultural Diversity Award at the Sejong Culture Awards hosted by the Ministry of Culture, Sports and Tourism.

== Broadcast ==
The EBS space premiered on April 3, 2004. with its first broadcast of soprano Shin Young-ok's live performance, and the hall had converted the auditorium on the first floor of the EBS office building into a small concert hall. It features a cramped concert hall with a distance of only 3m between the stage and the audience, and it is broadcast in a way that relies solely on the artist's live for everything without any stage equipment. Five critics and three producers monitor various albums every week and then decide the cast together.

== EBS Hello Rookie Contest ==
EBS Hello Rookie Contest is an annual competition held by The EBS space, starting with a rookie discovery project that began in 2007. It has been co-hosted by the Ministry of Culture, Sports and Tourism and the Korea Creative Content Agency since 2008. The Hello Rookie Contest is regarded as the most representative competition that is the medium in making Korean rookie indie bands famous, and bands such as Guckkasten, Kiha & The Faces, Daybreak and Jambinai first became famous through the competition.
