= Monni (band) =

South Korean rock band

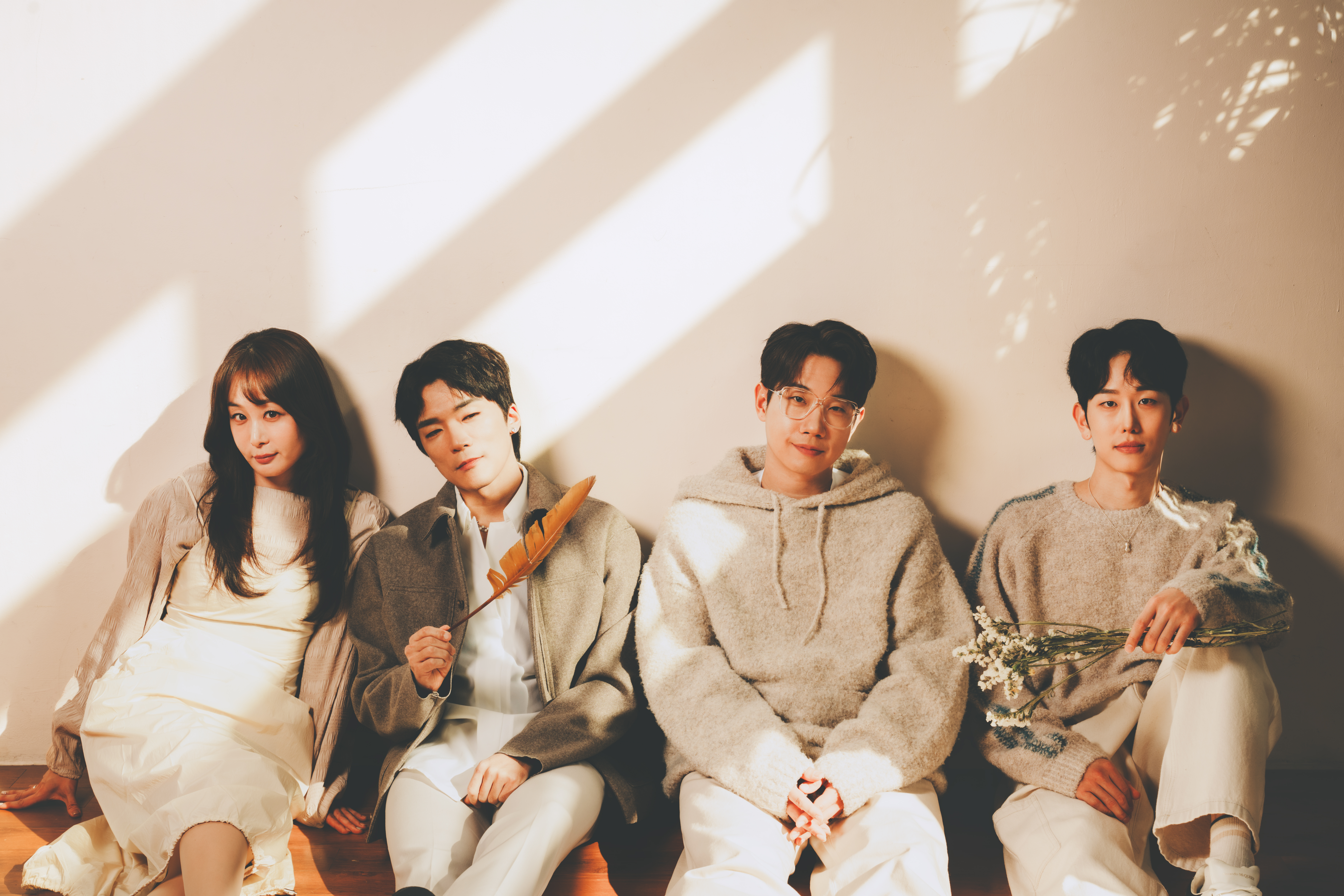
- Monni in 2024. L-R: Lee In-kyoung, Kim Shin-eui, Gong Tae-woo, Jung Hoon-tae

Background information
- Origin: South Korea
- Genres: Alternative rock
- Years active: 2004–present
- Labels: Soundholic; Modern Boy
- Members: Kim Shin-eui; Gong Tae-woo; Lee In-kyoung; Jung Hoon-tae
- Past members: Song Ju-hwan
- Website: modernboyent.com

Monni (Korean: 몽니) is a South Korean rock band signed to Modern Boy Entertainment. The quartet consists of Kim Shin-eui (vocals), Gong Tae-woo (guitar), Lee In-kyoung (bass), and Jung Hoon-tae (drums). The band formed in 2004 and they released their debut studio album First Day, Light the following year with their original drummer Song Ju-hwan. Following his departure from the band, Jung was recruited to take his place. The band released its second studio album This Moment in 2010. In celebration of their 10-year anniversary, they released a compilation entitled Monni 10th Anniversary Best Album 'Fix'.

== History ==
Beginning in winter 2003, Kim Shin-eui, Lee In-kyoung, Song Ju-hwan, and a keyboardist began practicing collectively. Kim read the word "monni" (몽니; lit. 'greed') in a newspaper and "immediately felt that it fit the image of our band, because the simply truth is, we are all greedy for good music". He suggested the name to his bandmates, which they all found satisfactory. Monni was formally established in January 2004. They performed together at Club Sluger for three to four months until the keyboardist quit the band. With Monni's future in limbo, Kim asked former punk-rock band member Gong Tae-woo to join, which he accepted. Monni released their debut studio album First Day, Light in 2005. The lead single "Showers" is a song about death and separation, which is based on Kim experiencing the death of a friend from a disease. The following year, the band was selected as a "hidden master" and were able to perform at the annual Ssamzi Sound Festival.

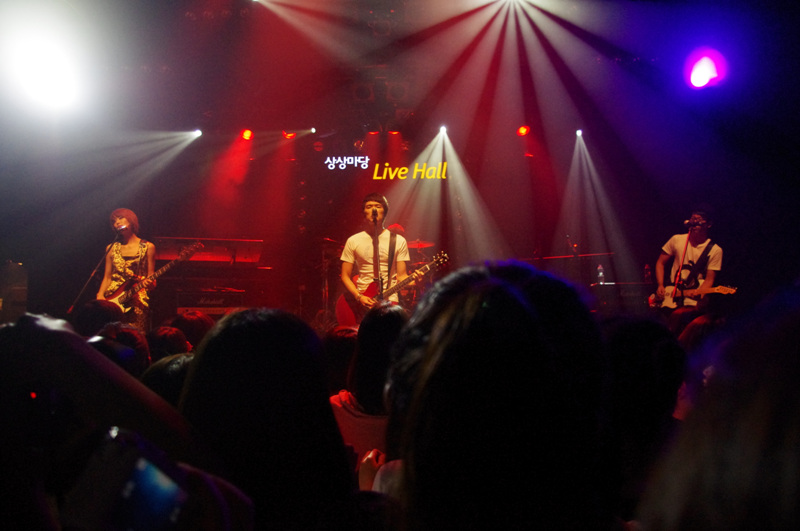
Monni performing at Mint Festa, 2010

After performing at a club in Hongdae, a representative of Soundholic approached Monni and they signed with the record label. In 2008, they released their first single album Monni: And,. In midst of preparing for their second studio album, Gong enlisted in mandatory military service and the band saw the departure of drummer Song. The latter was replaced by Jung Hoon-tae. In Gong's absence, the three remaining members began implementing elements of electronic music into the songs they crafted. Monni released their second album This Moment in June 2010. After spending seven years with Soundholic, Monni parted from the company in January 2014. They decided to leave the record label to "create our own music and reinvest our personal passion into songs that we could truly call ours". Kim established Modern Boy Records for the band to continue its activities.

Monni preceded the release of their fourth studio album with the single "Dotnaeyo" on March 11, 2014. They released Follow My Voice and lead single "In the Moment" the following week. They celebrated their 10-year anniversary with a compilation album; three of the twenty-two songs on its track list were decided by the band's fans. Parts one and two were released via online music stores on October 8 and 22, respectively, and the CDs were issued on October 27.

In 2017, Kim made his big-screen debut with Blue Busking, which features songs by Monni. He also served as the film's music director and won Best New Actor at the "Golden Cinematography Awards".

== Musical style ==
Musically, Monni is an alternative rock band. Early in its career, Monni's music was noted for its "vibrant, youthful appeal". Their music became "slower" and "more laid-back" over time. Kim cited indie bands Repair Shop and Cloud Cuckoo Land as his motivation. He contributes a substantial amount of the band's songwriting and integrates the products his bandmates generate. Kim's vocals have been compared to Tom Chaplin of Keane.

== Members ==
List of members and instruments.

- Kim Shin-eui (김신의) – vocals, guitar
- Gong Tae-woo (공태우) – guitar
- Lee In-kyoung (이인경) – bass
- Jung Hoon-tae (정훈태) – drums

Former member

- Song Ju-hwan (송주환) – drums

== Discography ==
=== Albums ===
==== Studio albums ====
Title	Album details	Peak positions	Sales
Title	Album details	KOR (Note: Gaon Music Chart was established in 2010 and began releasing data henceforth.)	Sales
First Day, Light (첫째 날, 빛; Cheotjjae Nal, Bit)	Released: November 30, 2005; Label: Aiins Digital, Modern Life; Formats: CD, digital download	—	
This Moment	Released: June 14, 2010; Label: Soundholic, TSN Company; Formats: CD, digital download	—	
A Singular Trip	Released: March 25, 2011; Re-released (A Singular Trip (Special Edition)): June 1, 2011; Label: Soundholic, TSN Company; Formats: CD, digital download	—	
Follow My Voice	Released: March 18, 2014; Label: Modern Boy Entertainment, Poclanos; Formats: CD, digital download	28	KOR: 808

==== Compilation albums ====
Title	Album details	Peak positions	Sales
Title	Album details	KOR	Sales
Monni 10th Anniversary Best Album 'Fix' CD1' (몽니 10주년 기념 베스트앨범 'Fix' CD1; Monni 10-junyeon Ginyeom Beseuteu Aelbeom 'Fix' CD1)	Released: October 8, 2015; Label: Modern Boy Entertainment, Mirrorball Music; Formats: Digital download	16	KOR: 998
Monni 10th Anniversary Best Album 'Fix' CD2' (몽니 10주년 기념 베스트앨범 'Fix' CD2; Monni 10-junyeon Ginyeom Beseuteu Aelbeom 'Fix' CD2)	Released: October 22, 2015; Label: Modern Boy Entertainment, Mirrorball Music; Formats: Digital download	16	KOR: 998

==== Live albums ====
Title	Album details
A-Live Take Out Vol. 1 'Playground and Diary' (놀이터와 일기장; Noriteowa Ilgijang) (with Vanila City)	Released: June 30, 2010; Label: Mnet Media, Genie Music; Formats: Digital download

==== Extended plays ====
Title	Album details	Peak positions	Sales
Title	Album details	KOR	Sales
The Boys Becomes Adult (소년이 어른이 되어; Sonyeoni Eoreuni Doeeo)	Released: March 20, 2012; Label: Soundholic, TSN Company; Formats: CD, digital download	—	
Life Is Beautiful (인생은 아름다워; Insaengeun Areumdawo)	Released: June 12, 2013; Label: Soundholic, TSN Company; Formats: CD, digital download	—	
She	Released: December 5, 2014; Label: Modern Boy Entertainment, Poclanos; Formats: CD, digital download	65	
Tried So Hard (한참을 뛰어오기만 한 너에게; Hanchameul Ttwieoogiman Han Neoege)	Released: October 26, 2016; Label: Modern Boy Entertainment, Poclanos; Formats: CD, digital download	20	KOR: 602
Analog Melody	Released: October 30, 2017; Label: Modern Boy Entertainment, Poclanos; Formats: CD, digital download	51	

=== Singles ===
Title	Year	Peak chart positions	Sales	Album
Title	Year	Gaon Digital Chart	Sales	Album
"Shower" (소나기; Sonagi)	2005	—		First Day, Light
"Tears Flow (Rearranged)" (눈물이 나; Nunmuri Na)	2008	—		Monni: And,
"You're Going to Leave Me" (나를 떠나가던; Nareul Tteonagadeon)	2010	—		This Moment
"You're Going to Leave Me (A-Live)" (나를 떠나가던; Nareul Tteonagadeon)	2010	—		A-Live Take Out Vol. 1 'Playground and Diary'
"You Blew It in Front of the House" (너 떠나버린 그 집 앞; Neo Tteonabeorin Geu Jip Ap)	2010	—		New Moment
"Sunshine"	2011	—		Travel of Only One-Time
"Always in My Heart" (언제까지 내 맘속에서; Eonjekkaji Nae Mamsogeseo)	2011	—		Travel of Only One-Time (Special Edition)
"Band Music"	2011	—		The Boys Becomes Adult
"Can't Write Love Songs Anymore" (더는 사랑노래 못 쓰겠다; Deoneun Sarang Norae Mot Sseugetda)	2012	— (Note: "Can't Write Love Songs Anymore" did not enter the Gaon Digital Chart, but peaked at number 71 on the Gaon Download Chart.)	KOR: 67,403	The Boys Becomes Adult
"Old Man" (노인 (老人); Noin)	2013	—		Life Is Beautiful
"Dotnaeyo" (돋네요; Dotneyo)	2014	—		Follow My Voice
"In the Moment" (순간 안에; Sungan Ane)	2014	—		Follow My Voice
"White Shoulder" (하얀 어깨; Hayan Eokkae)	2014	—		She
"The Boys Becomes Adult (Rearranged)" (소년이 어른이 되어; Sonyeoni Eoreuni Doeeo)	2015	—		Non-album single
"Stay Just Way You Are" (그대로 있어주면 돼; Geudaero Isseojumyeon Dwae)	2015	—		Monni 10th Anniversary Best Album 'Fix' CD1
"You're Going to Leave Me (Rearranged)" (나를 떠나가던; Nareul Tteonagadeon)	2015	—		Non-album single
"Beautiful" (아리따운; Arittaun)	2015	—		Monni 10th Anniversary Best Album 'Fix' CD2
"Grown Up"	2016	—		Non-album single
"Loudly" (고래고래; Gorae Gorae)	2016	—		Non-album single
"Stay Just Way You Are (OnStage ver.)" (그대로 있어주면 돼 (온스테이지 ver.); Geudaero Isseojumyeon Dwae Onseuteiji ver.))	2016	—		Non-album single
"Tried So Hard" (한참을 뛰어오기만 한 너에게; Hanchameul Ttwieoogiman Han Neoege)	2016	—		Tried So Hard
"Don't Forget Me" (나를 잊지 말아요; Nareul Ijji Marayo)	2017	—		Non-album single
"Remember My Voice" (내 목소리를 기억해줘; Nae Moksorireul Gieokhaejwo)	2017	—		Non-album single
"You&U" (너와 너; Neowa Neo)	2017	—		Analog Melody
"Wind" (바람; Baram)	2017	—		Analog Melody
"Myeong-dong Romance" (명동로망스; Myeong-dong Romangseu)	2018	—		Non-album single
"Rainy Season" (비의 계절; Bieui Gyejeol)	2018	—		Non-album single
"Goodbye My Girl"	2018	—		Non-album single
"Alive" (살아난다; Sarananda)	2019	—		Non-album single
"Our Spring Was Beautiful" (우리의 봄은 아름다웠고; Urieui Bomeun Areumdawotgo)	2020	—		Non-album single
"Romantic Breeze" (로맨틱한 바람; Romaentikhan Baram)	2020	—		Non-album single
"Tonight" (오늘 밤; Oneul Bam)	2021	—		Non-album single

=== Guest appearances ===
Title	Year	Release
"A Windy Day" (바람부는 날; Barambuneun Nal)	2009	2009 Autumn of Memory
"Without a Phone" (전화기가 없어도; Jeonhwagiga Eopseodo)	2011	Save the Air Green Concert
"Green Fish" (초록 물고기; Chorok Mulgogi) (featuring YeSLow)	2011	Sum∞ [Greenplugged Omnibus Album]
"It's Only My World" (그것만이 내 세상; Geugeotmani Nae Sesang)	2011	2011 Remake of Wild Chrysanthemum
"This Rain Is My Greed" (이 비는 내 욕심; I Bineun Nae Yokshim)	2012	Save the Air Green Concert Vol.2
"Met You by Chance" (어쩌다 마주친 그대; Eojjeoda Majuchin Geudae)	2012	Survival Top Band 2 Round 8-B
"With You" (님과 함께; Namgwa Hamkke)	2012	Survival Top Band 2 Round 16-C
"When Sorrow Comes" (슬픔이 올 때; Seulpeumi Ol Ttae)	2012	Survival Top Band 2 Round 8 Live Broadcast-A
"Always in My Heart" (언제까지 내 맘속에서; Eonjekkaji Nae Mamsogeseo)	2012	Survival Top Band 2 Round 4
"Love Love Love" (사랑 사랑 사랑; Sarang Sarang Sarang)	2015	I Am a Singer Season 3 Episode 4 'Songs of Respected Musicians'
"For You" (널 위한거야; Neol Wihangeoya)	2015	I Am a Singer Season 3 Episode 5 'The Song I Want to Sing'
"Spring Rain" (봄비; Bom Bi)	2015	Sum∞ Fifth Greenplugged Official Omnibus Album
"???" (멍든 마음 손에 들고; Meongdeun Maeum Sone Duelgo)	2015	Hahn Dae Soo 40th Anniversary 'Rebirth'
"Although I Loved You" (사랑했지만; Saranghaetjiman)	2016	Immortal Songs: Singing the Legend (The Late Kim Kwang-seok 20th Anniversary Volume 1)
"What the Matter" (왜 그래; Wae Geurae)	2018	Immortal Songs: Singing the Legend (Kim Hyun-chul, the Beloved Singer of Youth)
"Always" (언제나; Eonjena)	2018	Immortal Songs: Singing the Legend (Show! The Young Star We Love, Kim Won-jun)
"Forget You" (잊을게; Ijuelge)	2018	Immortal Songs: Singing the Legend (Pride of Korean Rock, YB)
"Gethsemane (I Only Want To Say)"	2018	Immortal Songs: Singing the Legend (Forever Diva, Yoon Bok-hee)
"The Face I Miss" (보고 싶은 얼굴; Bogo Shipeun Eolgul)	2018	Immortal Songs: Singing the Legend (Again)
"True Love" (참사랑; Cham Sarang)	2018	Immortal Songs: Singing the Legend (Reminiscing Voice, Kim Sang-hee)
"Always Winter" (언제나 겨울; Eonjena Gyeoul)	2019	Immortal Songs: Singing the Legend (Bravo, My Life! Thirty Times Spring Summer Fall Winter)
"Night Like Tonight" (오늘 같은 밤; Oneul Gateun Bam)	2019	Immortal Songs: Singing the Legend (Night Like Tonight Gentle Voice, Lee Kwang-jo)
"Let's Forget It" (이젠 잊기로 해요; Ijen Itgiro Haeyo)	2019	Immortal Songs: Singing the Legend (Story of Glorious Youth, Lee Jang-hee and Friends 2)
"Morning Dew" (아침이슬; Achim Iseul)	2019	Immortal Songs: Singing the Legend (Singing 100 Years of Korea with People)
"Man Tears" (사나이 눈물; Sanai Nunmul)	2019	Immortal Songs: Singing the Legend (Singing the Joys and Sorrows of Life, Lyricist Kim Byeong-geol)
"Reminiscence" (회상; Hoesang)	2019	Immortal Songs: Singing the Legend (Partners Who Sang Their Life Together, Chong Tae-chun & Park Eun-ok)
"Pledge of Love" (사랑의 서약; Sarangeui Seoyak)	2019	Immortal Songs: Singing the Legend (Episode 402 May Is Full of Love, Singing Happiness)
"Winter Sea" (겨울 바다; Gyeoul Bada)	2019	Immortal Songs: Singing the Legend (That Time of Our Youth, Kim Hak-rae)
"Want to Leave from You" (그대에게서 벗어나고파; Geudaeegeseo Beoseonagopa)	2019	Immortal Songs: Singing the Legend (Yoon Si-nae)
"I Have a Lover" (애인 있어요; Aein Isseoyo)	2019	Immortal Songs: Singing the Legend (Barefoot Diva Lee Eun-mi)
"I Will Survive" (난 괜찮아; Nan Gwaenchanha)	2020	Two Yoo Project – Sugar Man3 Episode9
"Turn On the Radio" (라디오를 켜봐요; Radioreul Kyeobwayo)	2020	Immortal Songs: Singing the Legend (Shin Seung-hun)
"Turn Up the Radio" (크게 라디오를 켜고; Keuge Radioreul Kyeogo) (with Yang Tae-hwan)	2020	Immortal Songs: Singing the Legend (Prodigy Special)
"Lalala" (라라라)	2020	Immortal Songs: Singing the Legend (Cho Young-soo)
"Spring Rain" (봄비; Bom Bi)	2020	Greenplugged Official Omnibus Album Sum∞ 10th Best
"Sad Beatrice" (슬픈 베아트리체; Seulpeun Beateuriche)	2020	Immortal Songs: Singing the Legend (King of Kings Special: 1st Half of 2020)
"One Million Roses" (백만송이 장미; Baengmansongi Jangmi)	2020	Immortal Songs: Cheer Up, Korea! Celebrity Special Part 1: Go Doo-shim

=== Soundtrack appearances ===
Title	Year	Release
"The Stars"	2012	Mabinogi Heroes Season 2 OST
"Black Mirror"	2019	Welcome 2 Life OST
