= Korean rock =

Rock music from South Korea

Korean rock (Korean: 한국 록) is rock music from South Korea. It has roots in American rock, which was imported to South Korea by U.S. soldiers fighting in the Korean War and stationing in U.S. military bases in South Korea after the war. Around the U.S. military bases, local musicians could have opportunities to learn American rock music and perform it on stage for U.S. soldiers. As a result, many Korean rock bands, called Vocal Bands or Group Sound, started their musical careers in the 1960s. Under the military administration in the 1970s, rock music and its subculture were classified as a depraved youth culture and restricted. After the Korean Fifth Republic, the censorship policies under the military government were abolished and rock music became a mainstream genre in South Korea until the end of the 1980s.

== History ==
=== 1950s ===
Rock music was brought to South Korea in 1950 by U.S. soldiers fighting in the Korean War. After the war ended in 1953, many U.S. soldiers remained in South Korea, stationed on military bases, where local musicians and singers performed. In 1957, South Korea's first rock guitarist, Shin Jung-hyeon, debuted on a U.S. military base. Shin, who came to be known as South Korea's "Godfather of rock", later said that Korean rock was born on U.S. military bases. One girl group called The Kim Sisters debuted on the U.S. military base stage, practiced their talents and skills, and then started their musical career in the United States.

=== 1960s ===
In 1962, Shin Jung-hyeon formed the first Korean rock band, Add4. Soon after, other Korean rock bands, referred to as "Group Sound" musicians, emerged, including Key Boys, HE6, Pearl Sisters, and K'okkiri Brothers. The Key Boys who are best known for their hit song, "Let's Go to the Beach." The group sound musicians of the mid-1960s were heavily influenced by American and British rock of the same era. However, instead of performing exclusively on U.S. military bases, they began to perform for South Korean audiences. The first generation of Korean rock musicians, including Shin Jung-hyeon, started to appear in the 1960s. However, South Korea was suffering under a totalitarian military dictatorship and the social atmosphere under the Park Chung Hee administration, which was still conservative and closed, hippie culture and rock music, which was representative of youth culture, was merely a target of suppression. In the 1960s, while western countries and Japan were overwhelmed by a new youth culture revolution with rock music, South Korea was far from the fad.

=== 1970s ===
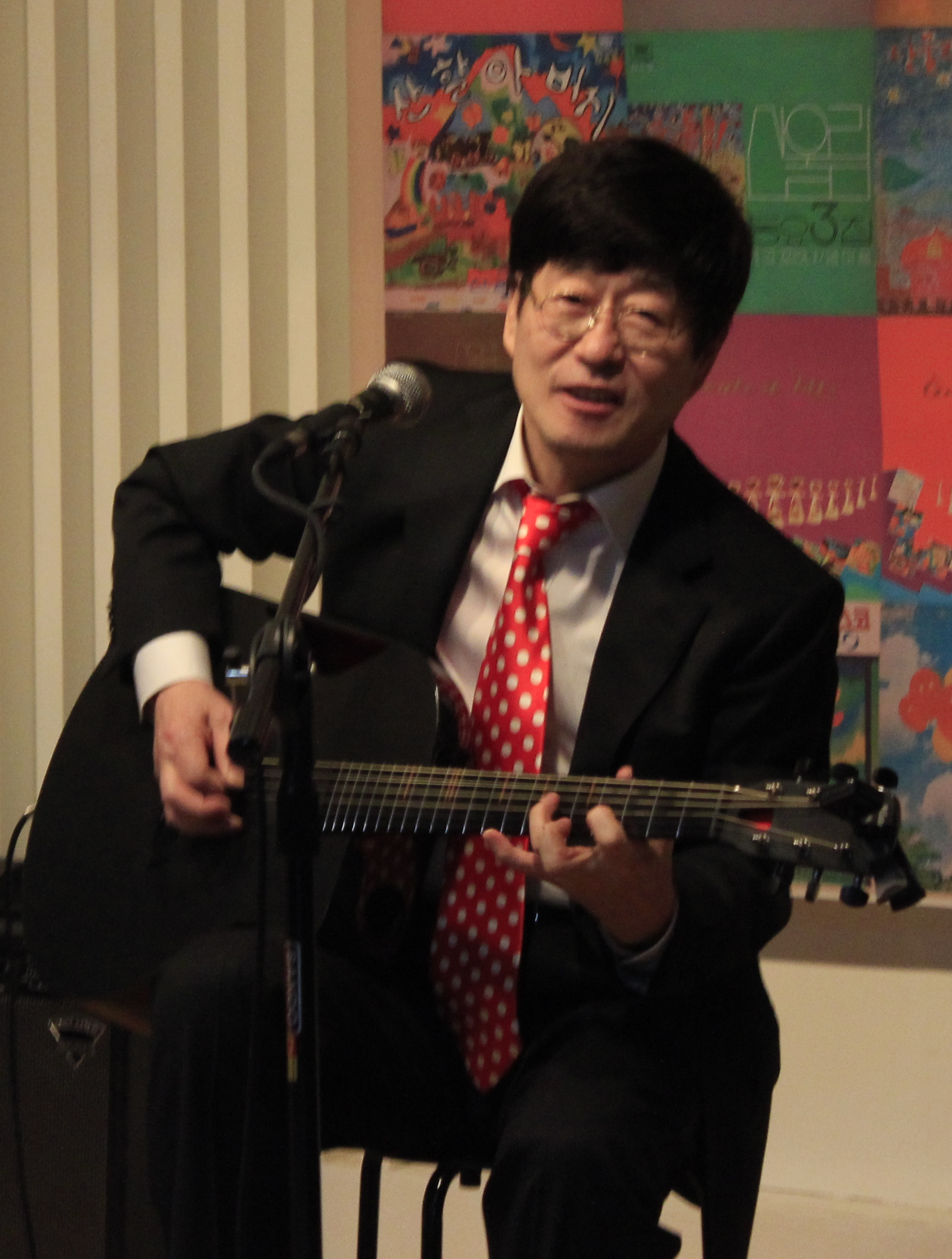
Kim Chang-wan of Sanulrim

During the 1970s, music was heavily censored by Park Chung Hee administration. Shin Jung-hyeon was imprisoned on drug charges. Han Dae-soo moved to New York in self-exile after two of his albums were banned by the government. The imprisonment of Shin slowed the production of Korean rock, but other artists, most notably Sanulrim emerged during the late 1970s, before dance music came to dominate Korean popular music in the 1980s. Nonetheless, since the 1970s, with the spread of the phonograph to middle-class families, the distribution of pirated foreign music, and the popularity of playing rock and pop music in music cafes, the number of rock music fans increased and the foundation of rock music culture began to grow. Although there were far more opportunities to listen to western original rock music, the government's censorship was still strict, preventing creative activities from being free.

=== 1980s ===
In the 1980s, popular musical tastes moved away from rock music. The scene was dominated by heavy metal music, in particular Boohwal, Sinawe, and Baekdoosan collectively known as the “Big 3”. The young generation of South Korea who grew up listening to rock music in the early '70s became college students or adults and became the main members of the rock called Group Sound, which led to a craze in the '80s. In 1980, the hard rock band Magma came out at the college song festival and shocked people. Hard rock and heavy metal were also gaining attention in Korea due to the appearance of Magma. Since then, Boohwal, Sinawe, and Baekdoosan the bands that represent the 1980s, were also called the Korean Rock Band Trio in the 80s. The song festival also attracted attention from rock bands that would succeed Magma, T-sams in 1987 and Infinite Track in 1988. The 1980s was when rock music came closest to the mainstream of Korean pop music, with rock bands often being at the top of music ranking programs aired by public television and radio. In the 1980s, one of the reasons rock music became more popular than in the past was that censorship was somewhat eased compared to the Park Chung Hee administration.

=== 1990s–present ===
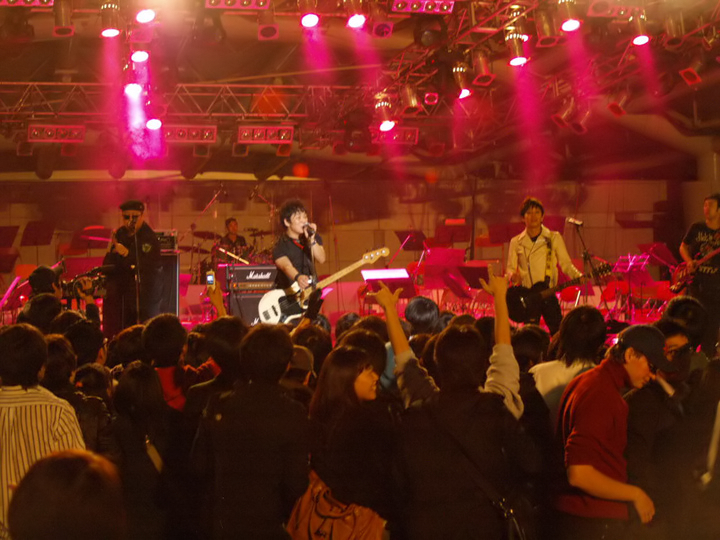
Crying Nut performing in 2009

Rock music was revived in the early 1990s with democratization following the presidency of Roh Tae-woo. As information flowed more freely into the country, Korean youths were exposed to decades of popular foreign music in a short span of time, and some began to form bands. Two of the earliest bands were Crying Nut and No Brain, which introduced the country to a variety of new genres in a localized blend called "Chosun Punk", spearheaded by indie label Drug Records which also managed Club Drug. With increased globalization and access to the Internet, the music scene diversified and incorporated more styles of music. The late 1990s saw increasing diversity in musical influences, as younger bands like Rux emerged and The Geeks introduced Korea to straight edge hardcore punk. Ska-punk was another strong early influence, producing bands including Lazybone and Beach Valley. In 2006, Skasucks formed and led the ska-punk movement in Korea.

The second wave of Korean heavy metal began in the 1990s. While metal bands like Crash (1989), Seed (1996), and Sad Legend (1996) were performing Thrash Metal and Death Metal in concert halls and smaller clubs such as Metallica in Shinrim-dong and Drug in Hongdae, there were other heavier genres that would appear in South Korea. Thanks to the internet, extreme metal subgenres like Black Metal and Grindcore influenced bands like Kalpa (1996), Oathean (1996), Dark Mirror ov Tragedy (2003), and Mangani (2013). While the sound of some groups was influenced by their foreign counterparts, other bands added Korean elements to their sound. Some of the examples of this would be Dokaebi (도깨비) a death metal band with Korean chanting, Gostwind, a progressive metal band using traditional Korean instruments, and Bamseomhaejeokdan (밤섬해적단) which mixes Grindcore with Korean topics. Underground shows normally occur in Seoul, in the Hongdae and Mullae-dong areas, Busan, and Daegu. There are some festivals, like the Busan Rock Festival (2000–present), and the Dongducheon Rock Festival (1999–present).

In the 2000s, Korean media outlets started producing television series covering rock music. Korean Broadcasting System (KBS) produced a four-part musical drama series in 2010 called Rock, Rock, Rock based on the life of Boowhal founder Kim Tae-won and covers his life from middle school until the year 2003. In 2013 ArirangTV produced a 13-part series called Rock on Korea hosted by Kim Do-kyun, guitarist of Baekdooson, that chronicles rock music on the South Korean peninsula from the 1960s to present-day rock bands that are currently performing in Korean clubs.

In 2018, United States ex-pats Ian Henderson and Michael O'Dwyer produced the movie documentary K-Pop Killers. In the film, which took just over a year to film, the South Korean extreme metal scene is covered in detail. Current members of extreme metal bands and bands such as Baekdoosan and Mahatma are interviewed. Music venue owners like Lee Yuying of GBN Live House, Kirk Kwon of Thunderhorse Tavern and Jay Lee of 3Thumbs are also interviewed.

“Today, most kinds of music promotion in South Korea happen online, with diminutive mainstream attention and downloadable albums.” Promoters use social networking platforms to inform fans of upcoming shows. At one point in the early 2000s, fanzines were being made by expatriates and Koreans that discussed the rock subculture and reviewed local bands’ music releases. Thanks to the help, and interest, of foreigners and newcomers to the music scene, albums are being recorded, produced by members within the scene and then distributed by record labels founded underground band members. Some bands, like Dark Mirror ov Tragedy, have signed contracts with foreign labels and are receiving support from the label.

== Korean rock festivals ==
- Busan Rock Festival
- ETPFEST
- Dongducheon Rock Festival
- DMZ Peace Train Music Festival
- Jisan Valley Rock Festival
- Pentaport Rock Festival

== Artists ==
=== Solo ===
- Asian Glow
- The Black Skirts
- Bek Hyunjin
- Brokenteeth
- Cho Yong-pil
- Han Dae-soo
- Hanroro
- Jowall
- Jung Joon-young
- Kim Jae-joong
- Kim Jong-seo
- Kim Kyung-ho
- Kim Sa-rang
- Meaningful Stone
- Mid-Air Thief
- Parannoul
- Park Wan-kyu
- Seo Taiji
- Seomoon Tak
- Shin Hae Gyeong
- Shin Jung-hyeon
- Wapddi
- Woodz
- Yaya Kim
- Yim Jae-beom

=== Bands ===
ChRocktikal

- 10cm
- 24Hours
- 2Z
- 3rd Line Butterfly
- 9 and the Numbers
- Achime
- Add 4
- Apollo 18
- Autumn Vacation
- Biuret
- Bluedawn
- Bongjeingan
- Boohwal
- Broccoli, You Too?
- Bulldog Mansion
- Bulssazo
- Bursters
- Busker Busker
- Buzz
- Bye Bye Badman
- Cherry Filter
- Cinnamon Jam
- CNBLUE
- Cotoba
- Crash
- Crying Nut
- ChRocktikal
- Dabda
- Dark Mirror Ov Tragedy
- Day6
- Decadent
- Deulgukhwa
- DickPunks
- Dreamcatcher
- Drug Restaurant
- Eve
- The Freaks
- F.T. Island
- Galaxy Express
- Gate Flowers
- The Geeks
- Glen Check
- Green Flame Boys
- Hathaw9y
- Hollow Jan
- Hoppipolla
- Hyukoh
- IZ
- Jambinai
- Jannabi
- Jaurim
- Koreana
- Kuang Program
- Led Apple
- Life and Time
- Loro's
- Loveholics
- Lucy
- M&D
- Madmans Esprit
- The Monotones
- Moskva Surfing Club
- Mot
- Mukimukimanmansu
- My Aunt Mary
- Nell
- Nemesis
- Nerd Connection
- N.EX.T
- N.Flying
- No Brain
- Norazo
- No Respect for Beauty
- Oathean
- Oh! Brothers
- ONEWE
- Onnine Ibalgwan
- O.O.O
- OurR
- Pakk
- Parasol
- Phonebooth
- Pia
- QWER
- The RockTigers
- Rolling Quartz
- Romantic Punch
- Royal Pirates
- Rumble Fish
- Rux
- Sad Legend
- Sanulrim
- Seaweed Mustache
- Se So Neon
- Silica Gel
- Sinawe
- Skasucks
- Slant
- Sunkyeol
- SURL
- The Breeze - 브리즈
- The Koxx
- The RockTigers
- The Rose
- Thornapple
- TRAX
- TRPP
- Vanilla Unity
- Vassline
- Vibe
- Vrose
- Wave to Earth
- We Are The Night
- ...Whatever That Means
- Wings of the Isang
- Xdinary Heroes
- Yada
- Yangbans
- YB
- Zeonpasa
- Zzzaam

== See also ==
- Traditional music of Korea
- Music of South Korea
- List of South Korean bands
