= Pentaport Rock Festival =

South Korean annual music festival held in Incheon

Incheon Pentaport Rock Festival
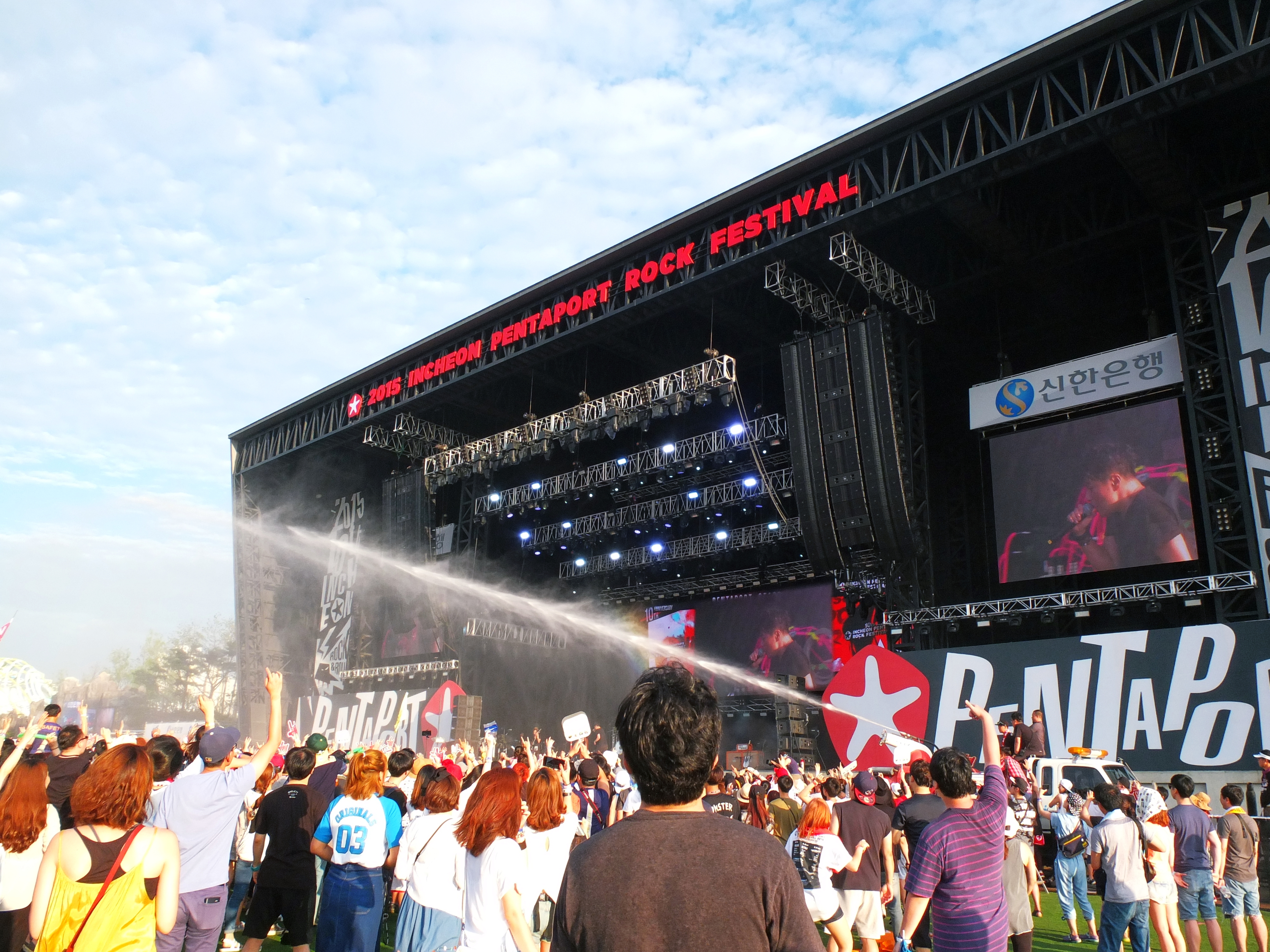
- 2015 Pentaport Rock Festival
- Genre: Rock music, electronic music, folk music, world music
- Dates: Last weekend of July (3 days)
- Locations: Incheon, South Korea
- Years active: 2006–present
- Website: www.pentaport.co.kr

Incheon Pentaport Rock Festival (Korean: 펜타포트 락 페스티벌) is a rock festival which is held annually in Incheon, South Korea for three days in August. Launched in 2006, it is considered one of the biggest live music events in South Korea. The festival covers various genres, but mainly rock music and electronic music. The name came from the five main themes of the festival: music, passion, environment friendly, DIY, and friendship.

== Location ==
The festival takes place at Dream Park, southern part of Incheon Metropolitan City. The site is about 30 kilometers west from downtown Seoul and it used to be a landfill of capital area like World Cup Park.

Due to COVID-19 pandemic, after being postponed for two months, the festival was held virtually for the first time in August 2020, engaging around 780,000 online viewers. The festival was held virtually for the second time in October 2021.

== History ==
The festival originally started in 1999 under the name Tri-port Rock Festival, a two-day rock festival held in Songdo, Incheon. Among the expected huge line-up were Deep Purple, Rage Against the Machine, Dream Theater, and The Prodigy but the event was cancelled due to operational and logistics challenges in the first year. After a seven-year hiatus, the festival was rebranded in 2006 with its current name, Pentaport. Organized by Incheon Metropolitan City, the Pentaport Rock Festival has since featured aspiring and prominent musicians and collectives from Korea and around the world.

== Line-ups ==
=== 2026 ===
	Friday, July 31	Saturday, August 1	Sunday, August 2
KB Kookmin Card Stage	Khruangbin; The Volunteers; Thornapple; The Poles; Broken Valentine; QWER; Band Nah	Massive Attack; Hyukoh; Lee Seung-yoon; Never young beach; Kwon Jin-ah; Far East Asian Tigers; JKG	Pixies; Silica Gel; Touched; Redoor; HANA; Bongjeingan; Dragon Pony
Monster Energy Stage	Xdinary Heroes; The Lemon Twigs; Kirara; MRCH; Mono No Aware; Shin In Ryu; Simile Land	The Jesus and Mary Chain; Jang Pill Soon; Isyana Sarasvati; Song Dongye; Say Sue Me; Green Flame Boys; Hi-Fi Un!corn	Sultan of the Disco; Original Love; Noizegarden; betcover!!; Bek Hyunjin; Dabda; Confined White
Stanley 1913 Stage	Flesh Juicer; The Fix; Mudd the Student; Sumin; Socialclub Hyangwu; Peach Truck Hijackers; Poser; Neu	The Geeks; Hollow Jan; Turtle Island; Baan; Ureuk and the Gypsies; Sanbo; Chungyoile; Lilly Eat Machine	Leenalchi; Fat Hamster & Kang New; Asian Spice House; Nyteh; We Steal Oranges; Yang Jeong Hoon; Casually Connected; Eddie and the Bricks

=== 2025 ===
	Friday, August 1	Saturday, August 2	Sunday, August 3
KB Kookmin Card Starshop Stage	Asian Kung-Fu Generation; Chang Kiha; Little Simz; Touched; Nerd Connection; Redoor; Meaningful Stone	Pulp; Hyukoh & Sunset Rollercoaster; Glen Check; Adoy; Omoinotake; Galaxy Express; Kardi	Beck; Jaurim; Lee Seung-yoon; Balming Tiger; Audrey Nuna; Hanroro; Mrch
Incheon Stage	Crying Nut; Tempalay; Bongjeingan; Modern Cinema Master; QWER; The Bowls; Dragon Pony	Method; Kaneko Ayano; Bye Bye Badman; Danpyunsun & The Moments Ensemble; Soumbalgwang; BABO; Dayangsung	3rd Line Butterfly; Kim Min-kyu; Touché Amoré; Lucy; Brandy Senki; Song So-hee; Far East Asian Tigers
Incheon Airport Stage	Rolling Quartz; TheyNeverChange; Catch the Young; Hyang; Kimseungjoo	Lowdown 30; Seoul Electric Band; Omar and the Eastern Power; Bøjeong; Creespy	Milena; Milledenials; Decadent; Confined White; Simile Land

=== 2024 ===
	Friday, August 2	Saturday, August 3	Sunday, August 4
KB Kookmin Card Starshop Stage	Turnstile; Se So Neon; Wave to Earth; Indigo la End; GUMX; Lacuna; KARDI	Jack White; Silica Gel; Girl in Red; Lee Seung-yoon; Broken Valentine; Hanroro; The Fix	Jannabi; Day6; Ryokuoushoku Shakai; Glen Check; Touched; Creepy Nuts; Redoor
Hillstate Stage	Kim Gordon; Toe; Broccoli, You Too?; Fire EX.; Remnants of the Fallen; Amado Lee Jaram Band; KAVE	Ride; Dark Mirror ov Tragedy; Parannoul; Goonam; Yuta Orisaka; Chudahye Chagis; Seaweed Mustache	Sepultura; Lee Sang-eun; Sunwoo Jung-a; Say Sue Me; The Poles; Playbook; jisokuryClub
Global Stage	QWER; OurR; Far East Asian Tigers; Catch The Young; Beirut Taxi; Default.	Golden Mammoth; Yeonjeong; Red C; Moher; Lif	MEMI; Sailor Honeymoon; Kim Neuk; Dayangsung; Asadal

=== 2023 ===
	Friday, August 4	Saturday, August 5	Sunday, August 6
KB Pay Stage	Ellegarden; Kim Yoon-ah; The Volunteers; George; Galaxy Express; Band Nah; Adios Audio	The Strokes; The Black Skirts; Lee Seung-yoon; Silica Gel; Method; Surl; Bosudong Cooler feat. BXH	Kim Chang-wan band; Se So Neon; Cherry Filter; Hitsujibungaku; Kwon Jin-ah; Nerd Connection; Dasutt
Incheon Airport Stage	Chang Kiha; Kirinji; My Aunt Mary; Romantic Punch; The Poles; Dabda; Løren	Idiotape; Jambinai; Rad Museum; Otoboke Beaver; Kim Il Du and Bulsechul; Park So Eun; Jungwoo	Ginger Root; Car, the Garden; Wave to Earth; Leenalchi; Numcha; Damons Year; Wendy Wander
Musinsa Stage	Debtors; The Sound; Cotoba; Green Flame Boys	Snake Chicken Soup; Kim Neuk; Crackberry	Home Slice; The Fix; Moskva Surfing Club
Midnight Stage	No Brain	250	

=== 2022 ===
	Friday, August 5	Saturday, August 6	Sunday, August 7
KB Pay Stage	Nell; Crying Nut; Sunwoo Jung-a; Lee Mu-jin; Elephant Gym; Crack Shot	Vampire Weekend; Jannabi; Se So Neon; Japanese Breakfast; Bibi; Silica Gel; CHS	Jaurim; Idiotape; The Volunteers; Phum Viphurit; Adoy; Cherry Filter; Wave to Earth
Cass Stage	Tahiti 80; Jukjae; Youra; CNEMA; TRPP; Hyodo and BASS; Jisokury	Deafheaven; Crack Cloud; Oohyo; Lang Lee; oceanfromtheblue; Hathaw9y	Mogwai; Lee Seung-yoon; Glen Check; Say Sue Me; Meaningful Stone; Drinking Boys and Girls Choir; The Bowls
Incheon Airport Stage	Fuzzy Pug; Bobby Pins	Soumbalgwang; Cram; Nuclear Idiots	Bongjeingan; Skipjack; Hwanho
Midnight Stage	Nucksal x CADEJO	STUTS (feat. JJJ, Sumin, Phum Viphurit)	

=== 2021 ===
Saturday, October 9	Sunday, October 10
Mogwai; Daybreak; Leenalchi; Adoy; Jeong Hong-il; METHOD; Nerd Connection; DIH	Phum Viphurit; 10cm; The Linda Lindas; Jukjae; The Volunteers; N.Flying; Kim Sa-wol; Silica Gel; Hey Men

=== 2020 ===
Friday, August 16	Saturday, August 17
Jaurim; Travis; Nell; The Ssaw Re:Union with Light and Salt; Bewhy; Se So Neon; Obangsingwa; Band DALE	Guckkasten; Boohwal; Idiotape; Galaxy Express; Kingston Rudieska; Dongyang Gozupa; Jackingcong

=== 2019 ===
	Friday, August 9	Saturday, August 10	Sunday, August 11
KB Kookmin Starshop Stage	The Fray; YB; Jang Beom-june; Kim Jong-seo	Cornelius; Two Door Cinema Club; Against the Current; Jambinai; Romantic Punch; Rock N Roll Radio; The Chairman meet Caotun Boys	Weezer; The Vamps; Sevdaliza; Crying Nut; NST & The Soul Sauce; Sonic Stones
Coke Stage	Sunset Rollercoaster; Vassline; HarryBigButton; Rux; April 2nd	Steelheart; Broccoli, You Too?; Wiretap In My Ear; Gonne Choi; Victim Mentality; Drinking Boys and Girls Choir; Riot Kidz; Triss	Pia; Bulnabang Star Sausage Club; 9 and the Numbers; So!YoON!; The Barberettes; The Rose
Incheon Airport Stage	This is the City Life (Tiger Disco, Horan and Yohei Hasegawa); Yamagata Tweakster; Seoul Sanggyeong Band; T.R.A.P; BADLAMB; GoryMurgy; Gyeongin Expressway	K-pop Party of Sadness (SKPP) (Johan Electric Bach, GCM, Mati Land and Manna); TearDrop; Hammering; Abyss; Amazing Show; Monoflo	CH1969 DJS (Jeon Yonghyeon, Hodori and Mimi); Batu; 88 BALAZ; Jung Yoo-chun Blues Band; Budung; Arches Band

=== 2018 ===
	Friday, August 10	Saturday, August 11	Sunday, August 12
KB Kookmin Starshop Stage	Jaurim; Daybreak; Romantic Punch; iamnot	Nine Inch Nails; Mike Shinoda; The Koxx; Crossfaith; Crash; Jannabi	My Bloody Valentine; Hyukoh; Hoobastank; Walk the Moon; Life & Time; Dearcloud
Kona Card Stage	Pia; Loudness; Sonic Stones; Hammering	The Bloody Beetroots; Glen Check; Marian Hill; Sunwoo Jung-a; DTSQ; Land of Peace; South Carnival	Starsailor; Suchmos; Se So Neon; never young beach; Adoy; O.O.O; MDSZ
Incheon Airport Stage	DJ Tezz; Cherry Coke; Crucial Star; Kisum & Jeon Ji-yoon; Microdot; Haon; R4-19; Honeypepper	Night Tempo & Yasunoji; Luna Pirates; Nahzam Sue and Big Waves; Vincent Corvec; Say Sue Me; N.Flying; Kimperi; Dabda; Strangely Arousing	Wetter; Xin Seha; AASSA; NST & The Soul Sauce; Eastern Standard Sound; Wantae; Riot Kidz; McGuffin

=== 2017 ===
	Friday, August 11	Saturday, August 12	Sunday, August 13
Chevrolet Stage	Guckkasten; Hyeongdon & Deajun & Rose Motel; Kang San-ae; Kingston Rudieska	Bastille; Kiha and the Faces; DNCE; Pia; Circa Waves; Thornapple	Justice; Idiotape; 5 Seconds of Summer; Zion.T; Crystal Lake; The Solutions
KB Kookmin Card Stage	Dua Lipa; Bolbbalgan4; Her Name In Blood; Asian Chairshot; Bupyeong All-star Big Band	You Me At Six; Akdong Musician; Swanky Dank; Issues; Lowdown 30; Vassline; The Vane	Charli XCX; Monni; Sundara Karma; Lee Yong-won; Samuel Seo & Qim Isle; Oriental Showcus; Kimoki FM
Heineken Green Stage	Lazybone; No.1 Korean; Ska Wakers; DJ Ska Champion; DJ Sugar Suk-Yuel; April Second; Honeyst	Broccoli, You Too?; Lee Seung-yeol; Adoy; Bulnabang Star Sausage Club; Imlay; O.When; O3ohn; Decadent; Land Of Peace	Kirara; Dguru; Ffan; Tiger Disco; Gogostar; Se So Neon; MDSZ; Cogason

=== 2016 ===
	Friday, August 12	Saturday, August 13	Sunday, August 14
Pentaport Stage	Suede; Nell; Run River North; Galaxy Express; We Are The Night	Weezer; Crossfaith; Grouplove; 10cm; Daybreak; Romantic Punch	Panic! at the Disco; Two Door Cinema Club; The Koxx; Spyair; Jung Joon-il; Peterpan Complex
Dream Stage	Special Stage for Kim Kwang-seok; The Oral Cigarettes; Crash; Method; Rux; Pentaport Super Band; Boys in the Kitchen; Inlayer	Nothing But Thieves; Idiotape; At the Drive-In; Life and Time; The Preatures; Iamnot; Oriental Showcus	The Vaccines; Peppertones; Dearcloud; Fromm; Jannabi; Black Honey; Maan
Cass Blue Stage	Zion.T; Microdot / Geeks; Ja Mezz / Incredivle; Rudepaper	DickPunks; Sultan of the Disco; Danpyunsun and the Sailors; Jun Bum Sun and the Yangbans	Monarchy; Xin Seha; LoveXstereo; Ludistelo

=== 2015 ===
	Friday, August 7	Saturday, August 8	Sunday, August 9
Pentaport Stage	Scorpions; Kim Chang-wan Band; The Used; Yellow Monsters; Monni	Seo Taiji; The Kooks; Pia; Ego-Wrappin'; Kim Banjang & Windy City; Soran	The Prodigy; YB; Crash; The Cribs; The Solutions; No.1 Korean & South Carnival
Dream Stage	N.EX.T; Fear, and Loathing in Las Vegas; Jambinai; Steelheart; 13 Steps; A'Zbus	10cm; Lee Seung-yeol; Swanky Dank; Kim Sa-rang; Sheppard; Asian Chairshot; Jannabi	Mew; Thornapple; Mamas Gun; Sunwoo Jung-a; Whowho; Raven; Reflex
Moonlight Stage	Diablo; Oriental Showcus; Yeonnamdong Dumb & Dumber; Blue Eyelids; Angry Bear	Bye Bye Sea; Maan; Method; Seenroot; Larry's Pizza	Boys in the Kitchen; Monkeys; The Roosters; Trash

=== 2014 ===
	Friday, August 1	Saturday, August 2	Sunday, August 3
Pentaport Stage	Lee Seung-hwan; Daybreak; Suicidal Tendencies; Pia; Maxïmo Park	Kasabian; Idiotape; Boys Like Girls; Crash; Orange Range; Rose Motel	Travis; Starsailor; Bulldog Mansion; Romantic Punch; Kingston Rudie Ska; Skull & Haha
Dream Stage	Crossfaith; Thornapple; Goonamguayeoridingstella; Lizzy Borden; Phusmental; Dempagumi.inc	The Horrors; Peppertones; The Inspector Cluzo; Dearcloud; The Solutions; No.1 Korean; Life And Time	Jang Phil-soon & Jo Dong-hee & Oh So-young; Urban Zakapa; Scandal; Harry Big Button; We Are The Night; Acollective; Small O
Moonlight Stage	Wangel; Third Stone; Hugh Keice; A'zbus; My Skin Against Your Skin; Baekma; City Hall Band	Ludistelo; Lee Ji-Hyung; Mimi Sisters; Reflex; Ashgray; 18 Gram	Wangel; No Respect for Beauty; Rux; Four Brothers; Jannabi; Garlics; Red Flower

=== 2013 ===
	Friday, August 2	Saturday, August 3	Sunday, August 4
Pentaport Stage	Deulgukhwa; Skid Row; Testament; Wiretrap In My Ear; The Big Pink	Suede; Yoon Do Hyun Band; Story of the Year; Hot Potato; Peace; DickPunks	Fall Out Boy; Chk Chk Chk; Kang San-ae; Yellow Monsters; Blood Red Shoes; Romantic Punch
Dream Stage	Pornograffiti; Monni; Steelheart; Naty; S.L.K.; Manggakhwa; Fine	Glasvegas; Man With A Mission; Oh Ji-eun; Soran; Sioen; Black Bag; Electric Eel; Utopia	Mamas Gun; Peterpan Complex; Swan Dive; Gogostar; Hemenway; Bye Bye Badman; Monkeys; Trash
Moonlight Stage	Beenzino & Dok2; Junggigo; Born Kim; Used Cassettes; New Blue Death	One More Chance; Autumn Vacation; Lalasweet; Prelude; Magna Fall	Windy City; Skull & Haha; Seoul Riddim Superclub; Siberian Husky

=== 2012 ===
	Friday, August 10	Saturday, August 11	Sunday, August 12
Pentaport Stage	Baekdusan; Super Session; Top Band 2 quarterfinal; Toxic; Icy cider; Gate Flowers; Axiz	Snow Patrol; Ash; Fact; The Koxx; The Qemists; Kingston Rudieska	Manic Street Preachers; Crystal Castles; Hot Potato; 10cm; Coldrain; Daybreak
Dream Stage	Windy city; Lasse Lindh w/ Linus' Blanket; Bye Bye Sea; Eastern Sidekick; Mongoose; DickPunks; We Save Strawberries	Crash; SiM; Art Of Parties; Vassline; Broken Valentine; My Skin Against Your Skin	The Inspector Cluzo; The Moonshiners; Hyeongdon and Daejun; Lee Seung-Yeol; Rose Motel; Bye Bye Badman; Tizzy Bac; Mocca
Lakeside Stage	Joaband; Lucite Rabbit; Have A Tea; Solsol Springwind; Electric Eel	Sweet Sorrow; Rooftop Moonlight; Soran; Joo Yoonha; Mushrooms	Huckleberry Finn; Urban Zakapa; Lalasweet; Speak Out; Hologram Film

=== 2011 ===
	Friday, August 5	Saturday, August 6	Sunday, August 7
Pentaport Stage	B.o.B; Miss A; Drunken Tiger and Yoon Mi-rae; GD & TOP and Taeyang	Korn; No Brain; Schizo; Maximum The Hormone; Spring, Summer, Autumn and Winter; Wiretrap In My Ear	Simple Plan; The Ting Tings; Boohwal; Neon Trees; Idiotape; Smacksoft
Dream Stage	Wonder Bird; W&Whale; Go Chic; Linus' Blanket; Pidgoen Milk; The Ghost Spardac; Choi Go-eun	Plain White T's; Garion; Mamas Gun; Vassline; The Geeks; Boni; Jambinai	Chk Chk Chk; Galaxy Express; Joe Brooks; The Black Skirts; Jang Jae-in; Super 8 Beat; Eastern Sidekick; Jo Gil-sang
Groove Session	Plastic Kid; DJ Yup fet. Koonta; Conan feat. MC Goltee; J-Path	Dr. Lektroluv; Limzi; Astro Voize; Inside Core	Dexpistols; Oriental Funk Stew; DJ Ryoo; Kingmck; Shut Da Mouth

=== 2010 ===
	Friday, July 23	Saturday, July 24	Sunday, July 25
Pentaport Stage	Stereophonics; Jo Duk-Hwan; Crying Nut; Kang San-ae; Galaxy Express; Lun Hui	Hoobastank; LCD Soundsystem; YB; Kishidan; Guckkasten; Biuret	Ian Brown; Dir En Grey; Kim Chang-wan; Ego-Wrappin'; Lee Han-Chul; Huckleberry Finn; Super Kidd
Dream Stage	Pia; The Like; Oh Ji-eun; Wu Bai & China Blue; Lee Jang-Hyuk & Oh So-Young; Ninesin; Strikers	Vassline; Wagdug Futuristic Unity; Ynot?; No. 1 Korean; Lee Sang-Min Band; Daybreak; 10cm; Phonebooth	Hot Potato; The Grates; Kingstone Rudieska; Opshop; Yellow Monsters; Serengetti; Orgeltanz
Groove Session	DJ Yoda; Inside Core; East Collective; 2E Love	Pendulum (DJ Set); Idiotape; Astro Voize	Kap10Kurt; Revolver 69; Mongoloid; J-Path

=== 2009 ===
	Friday, July 24	Saturday, July 25	Sunday, July 26
Big Top Stage & Pentaport Stage	No Brain; GoGo Star; Romantic Punch; Rux; Black Syndrome; Sogyumo Acasia Band; Sugardonut; Aggressive Dogs (a.k.a. UZI-ONE); Acidman; Crystal Rain; Trans Fixion	Deftones; N.EX.T; 99Anger; The Black Skirts; Guckkasten; W&Whale; Schizo; Eskimo Joe; Cocore; Kingston Rudieska; Hanumpa; Hollow Jan	Galaxy Express; GUMX; Nevada51; The Inspector Cluzo; The Plastic Day; Apollo 18; Lenka; Loro's; Seoul Electric Band; Killa Kela; Huckleberry Finn
Groove Session	Cosmic Gate; Gon; Conan; Risque Rhythm Machine; Kentaro; VJ Zirostyle	Astro Voize; Idiotape; Ujn&nova; Karizma; VJ Zirostyle	Dexpistols; Lefto; Unjin; Yahel; VJ Sol

=== 2008 ===
	Friday, July 25	Saturday, July 26	Sunday, July 27
Big Top Stage	Ellegarden; Crying Nut; The Music; The Go! Team; T.A. Copy; Copy Machine	Travis; Jaurim; The Vines; Lee Han Choul and Run Run Runawayz; The Ratios; End of Fashion; Superkidd	Underworld; Kasabian; Delispice; Hard-Fi; Oh! Brothers; Ozomatli; Windy City
Pentaport Stage	Peterpan Complex; Sweater; Double Famous; Rocket Diary; Beautiful Days; Burning Hepburn; Star Bow; Friday Ins	The Gossip; The Moonshiners; Devils; Sogyumo Acasia Band with Yozoh; Mary Story; Loro's; Broccoli, You Too?; Napoleon Dynamite; Blue Near Mother	Feeder; Tricky; GUMX; Inoran; Galaxy Express; Lowdown 30; D.I.C.E.; Paprika; Gutz
Groove Session	Kid B; DJ Rap; Shai; Fin	DJ Smood (Feat. MC Make-One); London Elektricity; Accomplice; Psyko	3rd Coast; Princess Superstar; Sunshine; Flamenco (Feat. MC SaphFire)

=== 2007 ===
	Friday, July 27	Saturday, July 28	Sunday, July 29
Big Top Stage	The Chemical Brothers; OK Go; Love And Peace; Diablo; The Human Instinct; Gov't Mule; Schizo	L'Arc-en-Ciel; Ocean Colour Scene; Testament; Crash; Vodka Rain; Vanilla Unity	Muse; Crying Nut; Ash; Asian Kung-Fu Generation; Nell; Vassline
Pentaport Stage	The Answer; Wiretap In My Ear; Hollow Jan; Pearl's Day; Tsuchiya Anna; Down In A Hole; Yellow Puffer; Bay; 21 Scott	Rainy Sun; Stevie Salas; 69 Chambers; Peterpan Complex; Johnny Royal; Ray Kang; Moombatrap; The Strikers; Starbow	Dr. Core 911; Yi Sung Yol; Every Single Day; Rux; Sugardonut; The Melody; Copy Machine; Cool Age; Andsome
Groove Session	DJ Takuma; BT; Hoola-Loops; Andy & Stu	DJ Smood; Fantastic Plastic Machine (Feat. Atsushi of Dragon Ash); Kid B; DJ Guru	DJ Beejay; DJ J-Path; DJ Hydro; Om-Shall-Om

=== 2006 ===
	Friday, July 28	Saturday, July 29	Sunday, July 30
Big Top Stage	The Strokes; N.EX.T; Snow Patrol; Sister's Barbershop; Pia; Sugardonut; Yeah Yeah Yeahs	Placebo; The Black Eyed Peas; Psy; Dragon Ash; Sinawe; Crash; Vassline	Franz Ferdinand; Kula Shaker; Jaurim; DramaGods; Nell; Lee Han Choul; T.A Copy
Mnet.com Stage	Jason Mraz; My Aunt Mary; Miyavi; Cuba; Lee Hyun Suk; Kang In O; Ghetto Bombs; Super Kidd	Fake?; Butterfly Effect; Schizo; Hachi & TJ; Vodka Rain; Pearl's Day; Beautiful Days; Desperado; Mongoose; Cloud Cuckoo Land	Hedwig and the Angry Inch (Korean Casting); Story of the Year; Dr. Core 911; Vanilla Unity; E Z Hyoung; Atmosphere; Windy City; Oh! Brothers; Common Ground; Monni
Groove Session	Oriental Funk Stew; Andy & Stu; Junkie XL; DJ Sunshine; DJ Devil; VJ The Maze	DJ Jaimo; DJ Paust; Ken Ishii; DJ Unkle; Airmix; VJ The Maze	DJ Guru; DJ Hyper; Makoto & MC Stride; DJ Kuma; VJ The Maze

== See also ==
- Media related to Pentaport Rock Festival at Wikimedia Commons
- List of music festivals in South Korea
