= Busan Rock Festival =

South Korean annual music festival held in Busan

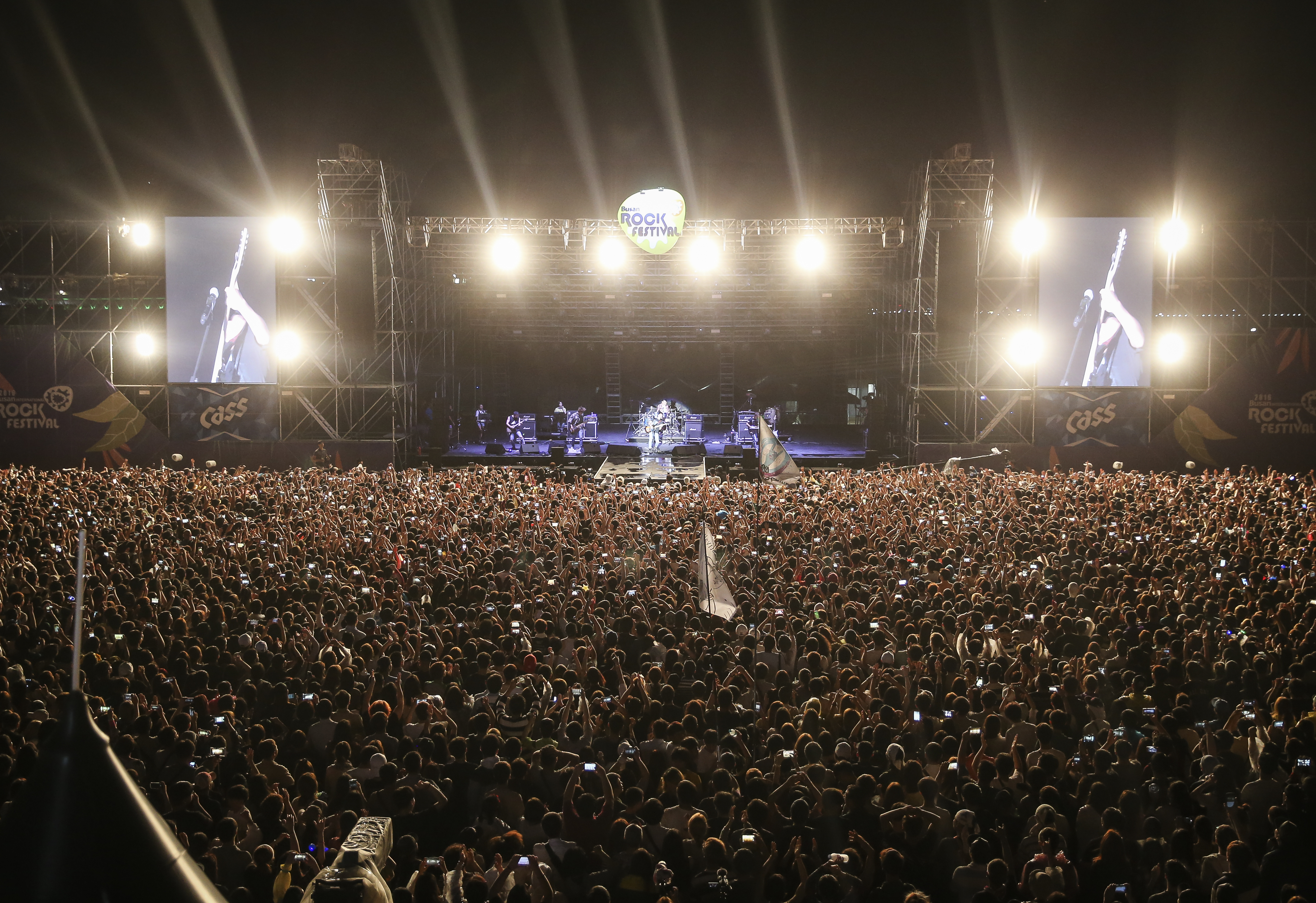
- Busan Rock Festival in 2016
- Genre: Rock, indie, metal
- Dates: July or August
- Locations: Busan, South Korea
- Years active: 2000–present
- Website: www.rockfestival.co.kr

Busan Rock Festival (Korean: 부산 록 페스티벌), known as the Busan International Rock Festival (Korean: 부산 국제 록 페스티벌) until 2015, is an annual outdoor music festival that takes place in Busan. Founded in 2000, it is one of South Korea's longest-running modern music festivals. The lineups include acts of various genres such as rock, metal, and indie. The admission was free of charge until 2019, when it transitioned into a ticketed event. The festival has undergone multiple fee changes, having costed 65 thousand won in 2019, increasing to 110 thousand won in 2023. The busan rock festival will cost 231 thousand won in 2024, a 255 percent increase from its first listing as a paid event. Busan Rock Festival has been conducting an artist exchange project by promoting international exchanges.

== 2000 line-up ==
15 July – 17 July, Gwangalli Beach, Busan

15 July	(South Korea) Chicken Head; (South Korea) Bulldog Mansion; (South Korea) Lilac; (South Korea) Grand Slam; (South Korea) Rainy Sun; (Philippines) Cheese; (South Korea) Sinawe; (Japan) Super Slump; (South Korea) Yoon Do-hyun Band (YB)
16 July	(South Korea) Mr. Soul; (South Korea) Wipper; (South Korea) Fancy; (South Korea) Dr. Core 911; (South Korea) Pia; (South Korea) Noize Garden; (Hong Kong) LMF; (South Korea) Crash; (Japan) Siam Shade
17 July	(South Korea) No Mark; (South Korea) Nell; (South Korea) Huckleberry Finn; (South Korea) Jeremy; (South Korea) Johnny Royal; (South Korea) Maroo; (China) Again; (South Korea) Crying Nut; (Japan) Missile Girl Scoot; (South Korea) Kim Kyung-Ho Band

== 2001 line-up ==
11 August – 13 August, Gwangalli Beach, Busan

11 August	(South Korea) Purple Haze; (South Korea) Every Single Day; (South Korea) Nell; (South Korea) Fancy; (South Korea) Silent Eye; (South Korea) R.F. Children; (Indonesia) Pas; (South Korea) Black Syndrome; (Germany) Holy Moses; (Finland) Nightwish
12 August	(South Korea) Saint; (South Korea) Weeper; (South Korea) Trans Fixion; (South Korea) Psychotron; (South Korea) Rainy Sun; (South Korea) Diablo; (Singapore) Opposition Party; (South Korea) Tomikita Band; (South Korea) Crash; (Australia) Bodyjar; (Norway) Dimmu Borgir
13 August	(South Korea) Khan; (South Korea) Y-Not; (South Korea) Gosrak; (South Korea) Lazybone; (South Korea) Pia; (South Korea) Jeremy; (Taiwan) Mayday; (Philippines) Dicta License; (United States) Bruce Lee Band; (South Korea) Crying Nut

== 2002 line-up ==
1 June – 3 June, Gwangalli Beach, Busan

1 June	(South Korea) Moring Bond; (South Korea) Lowdown 30; (South Korea) Sinawe; (Japan) Michihiro Kuroda; (Sweden) Dimension Zero; (South Korea) Lee Hyun-Woo Band; (Austria) Edenbridge; (Republic of Ireland) Vanilla Fudge
2 June	(South Korea) Niflheim; (South Korea) Oathean; (South Korea) Crying Nut; (China) Cui Jian; (Japan) Cocobat; (United States) Cannibal Corpse; (South Korea) Yoon Do-Hyun Band; (Denmark) Royal Hunt
3 June	(South Korea) Rock Sinn; (South Korea) Psychotron; (South Korea) Jeremy; (South Korea) Crash; (Poland) Schizma; (Finland) Sinergy; (Canada) Devin Townsend; (South Korea) Spring Summer Autumn Winter; (Germany) Kreator

== 2003 line-up ==
7 August – 9 August, Da-Dae-Po Beach, Busan

8 August	(South Korea) Unchained; (South Korea) GumX; (South Korea) Biuret; (South Korea) Trans Fixion; (United States) Neil Zaza; (South Korea) Crash; (Sweden) Soilwork; (Sweden) Arch Enemy
9 August	(South Korea) Discotruck; (South Korea) Sugar Donut; (South Korea) Lazybone; (South Korea) Down In A Hole; (South Korea) Wiretrap In My Ear; (Austria) Visions of Atlantis; (South Korea) Hammer; (Sweden) Skyfire; (Germany) Rage

== 2004 line-up ==
5 August – 7 August, Da-Dae-Po Beach, Busan

6 August	(South Korea) Oh! Brothers; (Japan) Osaka Monaurail; (Japan) Ego-Wrappin'; (South Korea) Han Dae-Soo; (Germany) Xandria; (South Korea) Cherry Filter; (Sweden) Dark Tranquillity
7 August	(South Korea) Superdog; (China) Powell Young Band; (South Korea) Blackhole; (Russia) Victor Smolski; (Japan) Bump of Chicken; (South Korea) N.EX.T; (United States) Steve Vai

== 2005 line-up ==
5 August – 7 August, Da-Dae-Po Beach, Busan

5 August	(South Korea) Mr. Funky; (South Korea) What; (South Korea) Glam; (South Korea) Crying Nut; (United States) Richie Kotzen; (United States) Powerman 5000
6 August	(South Korea) Schizo; (South Korea) Vassline; (South Korea) Jeremy; (Germany) Domain; (South Korea) Crash; (United States) Deicide
7 August	(South Korea) Jude; (Japan) Kariyushi; (Japan) Waltz Elegy; (Japan) The Travellers; (South Korea) Pia; (United Kingdom) Steranko; (South Korea) Yoon Do Hyun Band

== 2006 line-up ==
5 August – 7 August, Da-Dae-Po Beach, Busan

5 August	(South Korea) Strikes; (South Korea) Trans Fixon; (Japan) Ska'sh Onions; (South Korea) Deli Spice; (South Korea) Kim Sung-Myun & Lee Hyun-Suk; (South Korea) Sinawe & Seoul Electronic Band; (United Kingdom) UFO
6 August	(South Korea) 13 Steps; (South Korea) Downhell; (South Korea) Naty; (Japan) D.H.A.T; (South Korea) No Brain; (United States) Andrew W.K; (Germany) Edguy

== 2007 line-up ==
4 August – 5 August, Da-Dae-Po Beach, Busan

4 August	(South Korea) Elsa; (South Korea) Kingstone Rudie Ska; (South Korea) Tama & Vegabond; (Malaysia) Pete Teo; (Japan) Doverman; (South Korea) Crying Nut; (South Korea) Kim Jong-Seo Band; (Japan) Tokyo Ska Paradise Orchestra
5 August	(South Korea) Barkhouse; (United States) Beatallica; (Japan) Joey Za-sa; (South Korea) Prana; (South Korea) Lee Han-Cheol Band; (South Korea) No Brain; (South Korea) YB; (United States) LA Guns

== 2008 line-up ==
2 August – 3 August, Da-Dae-Po Beach, Busan

2 August	(South Korea) Dear Cloud; (Malaysia) Tempered Mental; (South Korea) Y-Not?; (Japan) Copa Salvo; (South Korea) Eve; (South Korea) The Ratios; (United Kingdom) Sohodolls; (Japan) Toshi with - EARTH
3 August	(Japan) The Cigavettes; (South Korea) Superkidd; (Japan) B.B.B.B.; (Australia) End of Fashion; (South Korea) Pia; (United States) Shadows Fall; (South Korea) Hot Potato; (South Korea) Kang San-E Band

== 2009 line-up ==
7 August – 9 August, Da-Dae-Po Beach, Busan

7 August	(South Korea) Dry Flower; (South Korea) SPOTLIGHT; (South Korea) Nevada#51; (South Korea) Burning Hepburn; (South Korea) Hakata The Brhyssco; (South Korea) BlueIsland; (South Korea) MATE; (South Korea) GUYZ; (South Korea) The Southbay; (South Korea) Biuret (Guest); (South Korea) Prana (Guest); (South Korea) Baekdusan (Guest)
8 August	(South Korea) MATE; (South Korea) GUYZ; (South Korea) Serengeti; (South Korea) The Black Skirts; (Japan) Keitaku; (South Korea) Every Single Day; (South Korea) Onnine Ibalgwan; (Canada) Scatterheart; (South Korea) Lee Ji Hyung; (United Kingdom) (Australia) (France) (Germany) White Rose Movement; (South Korea) Kim Chang-Wan Band
9 August	(South Korea) 21 Scott; (South Korea) Rux; (South Korea) Trans Fixion; (Japan) ZAMZA N'BANSHEE; (South Korea) Cuba; (South Korea) Rainy Sun; (Japan) Anna Tsuchiya; (South Korea) Yoon Do Hyun Band; (United States) Overkill

== 2010 line-up ==
6 August – 8 August, Da-Dae-Po Beach, Busan

6 August	(South Korea) POE; (South Korea) Noeazy; (South Korea) Achime; (South Korea) Windycat; (South Korea) Telefly; (South Korea) THE UNITED93; (Japan) Non Troppo; (South Korea) Yellow Monsters
7 August	(South Korea) Burning Hepburn; (Hong Kong) King Ly Chee; (South Korea) Jude; (South Korea) Lee Han Cheul & Run run ways; (South Korea) Crying Nut; (South Korea) Boohwal; (United States) FireHouse
8 August	(South Korea) Unchained; (South Korea) Y-Not?; (South Korea) Guckkasten; (South Korea) Super Kidd; (South Korea) Pia; (South Korea) Yoon Do Hyun Band vs RRM; (Sweden) The Haunted

== 2011 line-up ==
5 August – 7 August, Samrak Park, Busan

5 August	(South Korea) D HAIT; (South Korea) Rots; (South Korea) DICKPUNKS; (South Korea) Romantic Punch; (South Korea) Go Go Star; (Australia) (New Zealand) (Canada) (United States) One Drop East; (Japan) Blanks; (United Kingdom) Steranko; (South Korea) Yoon Do Hyun Band
6 August	(South Korea) Bard; (South Korea) Nevada#51; (South Korea) Rockvan; (India) Mrigya; (South Korea) Bye Bye Sea; (South Korea) Kingston Rudieska; (South Korea) Every Single Day; (South Korea) Crying Nut; (Japan) Mongol800; (South Korea) Boohwal
7 August	(South Korea) The DeF & Contenders; (South Korea) MAHATMA; (Taiwan) Chthonic (band); (South Korea) Prana; (South Korea) Pia; (South Korea) Guckkasten; (South Korea) No Brain; (Germany) Heaven Shall Burn; (South Korea) Kim Chang Wan Band

== 2012 line-up ==
3 August – 5 August, Samrak Park, Busan

3 August	(South Korea) Broken Valentine; (South Korea) Herz; (South Korea) Yery Band; (South Korea) The Strikers; (South Korea) ICYCIDER; (South Korea) GWAMEGI; (South Korea) Gate Flowers; (South Korea) Romantic Punch; (South Korea) Super Kidd; (South Korea) Prana; (Japan) Galneryus; (South Korea) Kim Kyung Ho Band
4 August	(South Korea) Public Stereo; (South Korea) Pandaz; (South Korea) Downhell; (South Korea) CUBA; (South Korea) Cuba; (Japan) The Bashow; (South Korea) Nevada#51; (South Korea) Every Single Day; (Canada) Hilary Grist; (South Korea) Lee Han-Cheol Band; (United States) FireHouse; (South Korea) Boohwal
5 August	(South Korea) Ska Wakers; (South Korea) GOGOBOYS; (South Korea) Neon Bunny; (South Korea) Human Race; (South Korea) 4th Floor; (South Korea) Rose Motel; (South Korea) TODA; (South Korea) Monni; (South Korea) Bandtoxic; (South Korea) The Black Skirts; (South Korea) No Brain; (United Kingdom) James Walsh in Starsailor

== 2018 line-up ==
10 August – 12 August, Samnak Ecological Park, Busan

10 August	(South Korea) No Brain; (South Korea) Glen Check; (South Korea) Peppertones; (South Korea) April 2nd; (South Korea) HarryBigButton; (South Korea) Dear Cloud; (South Korea) Retrospect; (South Korea) WussaMi; (South Korea) 3rd Line Butterfly; (South Korea) Roberkix & Safira. K; (South Korea) The Vastards; (South Korea) Ego Function Error; (South Korea) Moonscent; (South Korea) Winda
11 August	(South Korea) Crying Nut; (Netherlands) Wouter Hamel; (South Korea) Lee Han-chul; (South Korea) Monni; (Chile) Sixi; (South Korea) 9 and The Numbers; (South Korea) Super Kidd; (South Korea) AASSA; (South Korea) Coming Up To The Seoul Band; (South Korea) Leavesblack; (South Korea) Momentsyumi; (South Korea) Soumbalgwang; (South Korea) Goldline; (South Korea) Billy Cater
12 August	(South Korea) YB; (South Korea) Romantic Punch; (South Korea) Jannabi; (South Korea) Bye Bye Sea; (South Korea) Galaxy Express; (South Korea) Bluepaprika; (South Korea) Say Sue Me; (South Korea) Emerald Castle & Kim Seong-meon in K2; (Hong Kong) Empty; (Japan) Segare; (South Korea) Platform Stereo; (South Korea) LA Bridge; (South Korea) Kirara; (South Korea) Kim Sa-wol X Kim Hae-won

== 2019 line-up ==
27 July – 28 July, Samnak Ecological Park, Busan

27 July	(South Korea) g.o.d; (South Korea) Nell; (South Korea) Romantic Punch; (South Korea) Jannabi; (Greece) (Sweden) Nightrage; (South Korea) Baek Ye-rin; (South Korea) Adoy; (South Korea) HarryBigButton; (South Korea) YUN DDan DDan; (Thailand) Paper Planes; (Hong Kong) Mocking Bullet; (Taiwan) TaiKo Electro Company; (South Korea) Cloudian; (South Korea) Rappelkopf; (South Korea) Gangkist
28 July	(United Kingdom) The Chemical Brothers; (Australia) Courtney Barnett; (South Korea) AKMU; (South Korea) Pia; (South Korea) Kim Feel; (South Korea) Hoppipolla; (South Korea) The Electriceels; (Japan) White Catss; (Chile) Solidal; (South Korea) Drinking Boys and Girls Choir; (South Korea) The Magus; (South Korea) LA Bridge; (South Korea) The Pony

== 2021 line-up ==
2 October, Samnak Ecological Park, Busan

2 Oct	(United States) Cigarettes After Sex; (South Korea) Crying Nut; (Australia) Cosmo's Midnight; (South Korea) Glen Check; (South Korea) Lee Mu-jin; (United States) Hippo Campus; (South Korea) DickPunks; (South Korea) Bibi; (South Korea) George; (South Korea) Say Sue Me; (South Korea) Moon Su-jin; (South Korea) Hathaw9y; (South Korea) Daldam

== 2022 line-up ==
1 October – 2 October, Samnak Ecological Park, Busan

1 Oct	(United Kingdom) Bastille; (United Kingdom) Oh Wonder; (South Korea) Jannabi; (South Korea) Romantic Punch; (South Korea) Soran; (South Korea) Se So Neon; (South Korea) Adoy; (South Korea) The Volunteers; (Japan) Never Young Beach; (South Korea) Woodz; (Taiwan) I Mean Us; (South Korea) Minsu; (South Korea) Bosudong Cooler; (South Korea) Lucy; (South Korea) Kardi; (Thailand) Desktop Error; (South Korea) Daldam
2 Oct	(United Kingdom) Honne; (South Korea) Nell; (South Korea) Boohwal; (South Korea) Crying Nut; (South Korea) Baek Ye-rin; (South Korea) My Aunt Mary; (South Korea) Glen Check; (South Korea) Thornapple; (South Korea) Galaxy Express; (South Korea) Silica Gel; (South Korea) Meaningful Stone; (Israel) Iogi; (South Korea) Hathaw9y; (Israel) Hila Ruach; (South Korea) Cnema; (South Korea) Jackingcong

== 2026 line-up ==
2 October – 4 October, Samnak Ecological Park, Busan

The 2026 Busan International Rock Festival will feature artists including Avenged Sevenfold, Megadeth, and The Libertines.

2 Oct	(United States) AVENGED SEVENFOLD; (South Korea) Brocholi, You too?; (South Korea) Lee seung-yoon; (South Korea) Jang Beom-june; (Japan) Creep Hyp; (South Korea) Kang San-eh; (South Korea) gongwon; (South Korea) DADADA; (Japan) DYGL; (South Korea) D82; (Japan) LUCKLIFE; (South Korea) Romantic Punch; (South Korea) Redoor; (South Korea) BandKirin
3 Oct	(United States) Megadeth; (South Korea) Suchmos; (South Korea) IDIOTAPE; (South Korea) Jannabi; (South Korea) TOUCHED; (Japan) GOODMOOD; (South Korea) Gogohawk; (South Korea) KWON JINAH; (South Korea) WOODZ; (South Korea) Broken Valentine; (South Korea) Skawakers; (South Korea) Saysueme
4 Oct	(United Kingdom) THE LIBERTINES; (South Korea) SONGOLMAE; (South Korea) CNBLUE; (South Korea) Hanroro; (Japan) Hitsujibungaku; (South Korea) KACHISAN; (South Korea) Far East Asian Tigers; (South Korea) Meaningful Stone; (South Korea) KIM SUNGKYU; (South Korea) NERD CONNECTION; (South Korea) Noridogam; (South Korea) Damons year

== See also ==
- List of music festivals in South Korea
