= Supersonic Festival (Seoul) =

Annual music festival in Seoul, South Korea

- Genre: Hip hop, Rock, Pop
- Locations: Olympic Park, Seoul, South Korea: SK Olympic Handball Gymnasium; Olympic Gymnastics Arena; Mongchontoseong
- Years active: 2012–2014
- Website: http://www.supersonickorea.com/

Supersonic Festival was a yearly music festival in Seoul.

== Festival line-ups ==
Supersonic 2012	14 August	15 August
Supersonic 2012	The Smashing Pumpkins; Gym Class Heroes; Jang Kiha and the Faces; Yellow Monsters; Soulwax; Basement Jaxx; Idiotape; Glen Check; Brave Guys; The Wiretap in My Ear; Gogoboys; 24 Hours; Art of Parties; Javo Island	New Order; Tears for Fears; Foster the People; The Vaccines; Go Go Star; Gotye; Jaurim; Guckkasten; Goonamguayeoridingstella; Galaxy Express; Ynot?; Romantic Punch; Galactic Federation; MDS
Supersonic 2013	14 August	15 August
Supersonic 2013	Pet Shop Boys; Earth, Wind & Fire; Glen Check; DickPunks; HarryBigButton; Two Door Cinema Club; Willy Moon; Capital Cities; Super Kidd; Eastern Sidekick; Humming Urban Stereo; Standing Egg; Sugarbowl; DOT; Seoninjang	Cho Yong-pil; Jaurim; Aziatix; Hot Chelle Rae; DJ Koo; Hwang Sin-hye band; MC the Max; John Legend; DJ DOC; Vibe; Verbal Jint; Palma Violets; Gajame Boyscout with Shin Cho-e; Lindsey Stirling; 10cm; Lucia; Julia Hart; Joa Band; Royal Pirates
Supersonic 2014	14 August	
Supersonic 2014	Queen + Adam Lambert; Phoenix; No Brain x Crying Nut; The 1975; A Great Big World; Sultan of the Disco; Gateflowers	

== See also ==
- List of music festivals in South Korea
- List of pop festivals
