= Supersonic Festival =

Supersonic Festival may also refer to:

- Supersonic Festival (Seoul), an annual music festival in Seoul, South Korea
- Supersonic Festival (Birmingham), an annual music festival in Birmingham, England
