= Kim Sa-rang =

Kim Sa-rang may refer to:

- Kim Sa-rang (actress) (born 1978), South Korean actress
- Kim Sa-rang (singer) (born 1981), South Korean rock singer-songwriter
- Kim Sa-rang (badminton) (born 1989), South Korean badminton player
- Kim Sa-rang (chess player) (born 2011), South Korean chess player
