= NST & The Soul Sauce =

South Korean reggae band

NST & the Soul Sauce (소울소스)
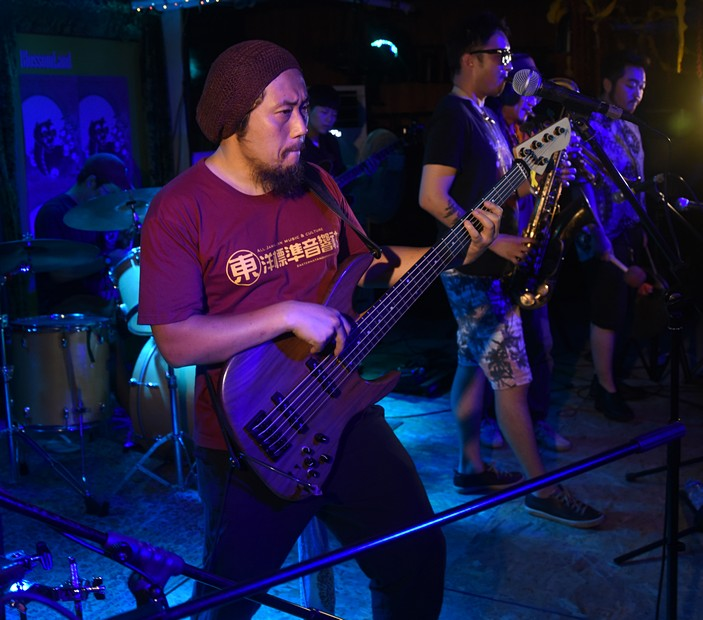
- NST & the Soul Sauce perform in Seoul on 10 August 2017, to release their first full-length, "Back When Tigers Smoked."

Background information
- Origin: Seoul, South Korea
- Genres: reggae, dub, afrobeat, jazz, funk, soul, psychedelic pansori, gugak
- Years active: 2014–present
- Label: Eastern Standard Sounds
- Members: Kim Yul-hee: vocal, kkwaenggwari; Noh Seon-teck: bass, vocal, harmony; Smiley Song: percussion, harmony; Lee Si-mun: guitar, harmony; yoo Seong-Chel: Trumpet; Song Seung-Ho: Saxophone; lee Kyu-hyun: Keyboards; Kang Shin-Tae: Drums; Jun Park: Dub Wiser; Previous members; Kang Tek-hyun: drums, harmony; Oh Jeong-seok: trumpet, flugelhorn (now producer); Lee Jong-min: keyboards, harmony (former); Shin Hyun-pil: tenor, baritone sax, harmony (former); Kim Violin: violin (former)

NST & the Soul Sauce (노선택과 소울소스) is a South Korean reggae band formed in 2014. They have received critical attention for their unique blend of Jamaican genres such as reggae and dub, as well as jazz, afrobeat, funk, soul, and psychedelic, with traditional Korean music, especially pansori. Members of the band have also been part of reggae band Windy City, retro rock band Kiha and the Faces, Kingston Rudieska, and I&I Djangdan, qualifying them for "supergroup" status. They received international attention at Fuji Rock Festival for their song dedicated to late great trombonist Rico Rodriguez.

The NST stands for initials of Noh Sun-teck, band leader, who started the project off solo before recruiting other members. He recorded his first solo album "Low and Steady" which led to the creation of the band. Previously he performed with gypsy trio Surisurimahasuri and reggae band Windy City, with which he performed at SXSW, Canadian Music Week, and Sierra Nevada World Music Festival.

They have performed in China, Japan, the US, Colombia, and Chile. In the US, they opened for legendary Jamaican producer Lee "Scratch" Perry. They also performed at an impeachment rally against President Park Geun-hye in 2016.

== Pansori project ==
In 2017, NST & the Soul Sauce paired up with multi-award-winning pansori vocalist Kim Yul-hee. Her status in the band is unclear but she has joined them on most overseas tours. They had been connected when director Kim Tae-yong, known for experimenting with traditional Korean music, invited them to perform a piece called "Reggae Inna Film, Heungbu" at Muju Film Festival.

Kim Yul-hee appeared on "Red Tiger" on their 2017 release "Back When Tigers Smoked," but the 2019 album "Version" put her more at the vocal center of the band, with multiple pansori entries including "Bbaengdeok" from the pansori play "Simcheongga" and "Joong Taryeong" (Monk Song), which uses verses from "Simcheongga" and "Heungboga." Also included are "Bak Taryeong" (Gourd Song) from "Heungboga" and the folk song "Heung Taryeong." The album was mixed by Naoyuki Uchida.

Kim said it was difficult but rewarding to combine reggae and gugak rhythms. She has over 20 years of pansori experience from a young age, and studied under Sung Woo-hyang, Park Ae-ri and Han Seung-suk. She also sings a more modern style with the jazz fusion group NEQ, whose album "Passing of Illusion" won a Korean Music Award in 2016 for Best Crossover Album.

They are not actually the first reggae band to perform with a pansori singer, which was previously accomplished by dub-reggae band I&I Djangdan with pansori singer Jang Goon, who also formed the future pansori dub duo Ninano Nanda. Jang Goon also had collaborated with ska band Kingston Rudieska. However, this collaboration was the first that mixed in authentic pansori songs, rather than pansori vocal style.

== Critical response ==
Their debut EP was selected as Album of the Week on Naver Music. Korean Indie said of their first album, "This is a trailblazing album for the Korean reggae scene and a new level of cultural intermixture. I was perplexed at the existence of a reggae scene in Korea, but Back When Tigers Smoked articulates the ways in which the Korean psyche can be embraced by the Jamaican genre."

== Notable appearances ==
=== International tours ===
- [2016] Fuji Rock Festival (Japan)
- [2016] Hong Kong International Reggae Ska Festival
- [2017] Sierra Nevada World Music Festival (USA)
- [2017] Tour Opening for Lee "Scratch" Perry (USA)
- [2017] Circulart (Colombia)
- [2018] En Orbita (Chile)
- [2019] Ear HUB (Hong Kong)
- [2019] Fuji Rock Festival (Japan)
- [2019] Zudrangma Records Presents Thailand Tour (Thailand)
- [2019] WOMEX (Finland)
- [2019] Mundial Montreal (Canada)
- [2019] Rencontres Trans Musicales (France)

=== Local festivals, other ===
- [2016] Pentaport Rock Festival
- [2016] Jarasum International Jazz Festival
- [2016] Hwaeom Spiritual Music Ritual
- [2016] Impeachment protests against Park Geun-hye
- [2017] Ulsan World Music Festival
- [2018] DMZ Peace Train Music Festival
- [2018] Pentaport Rock Festival
- [2018] House of Vans
- [2018] Jeju Folk Village Festival
- [2019] Do-ol Ah-in Going All Directions (KBS)
- [2019] Pentaport Rock Festival
- [2019] Playground Picnic Festival
- [2019] Gangwon Rock Festival

== Discography ==
=== Albums ===
- [2016.6 ] 'Back When Tiger Smoked (International edition.)' (CD, Eastern Standard Sounds)
- [2016.9 ] 'Back When Tigers Smoked (Korea edition.)' (CD, Eastern Standard Sounds)
- [2019.3 ] NST & The Soul Sauce meets Kim Yul Hee - Version (Korea Edition) (CD, Eastern Standard Sounds)
- [2019.3 ] NST & The Soul Sauce meets Kim Yul Hee - Version (Korea Edition) (LP, Eastern Standard Sounds)
- [2019.6 ] NST & The Soul Sauce meets Kim Yul Hee - Version (JAPAN Edition) (CD, P-Vine)

=== Singles and EPs ===
- [2016.4 ] 'Heaven is Here/ Song for Rico' EP (CD, Eastern Standard Sounds)
- [2016.9 ] 'Heaven is Here/ Song for Rico'(7 Inch Vinyl, Eastern Standard Sounds)
- [2020.3 ] NST & The Soul Sauce meets Kim Yul Hee- (Who Knows)The Swallow Knows (Digital/ 7 Inch Vinyl, Eastern Standard Sounds)

=== Compilations ===
- [2019] 2019 SPIN Magazine Compilation "Indie Asia" Vol.1
