= HarryBigButton =

South Korean rock band

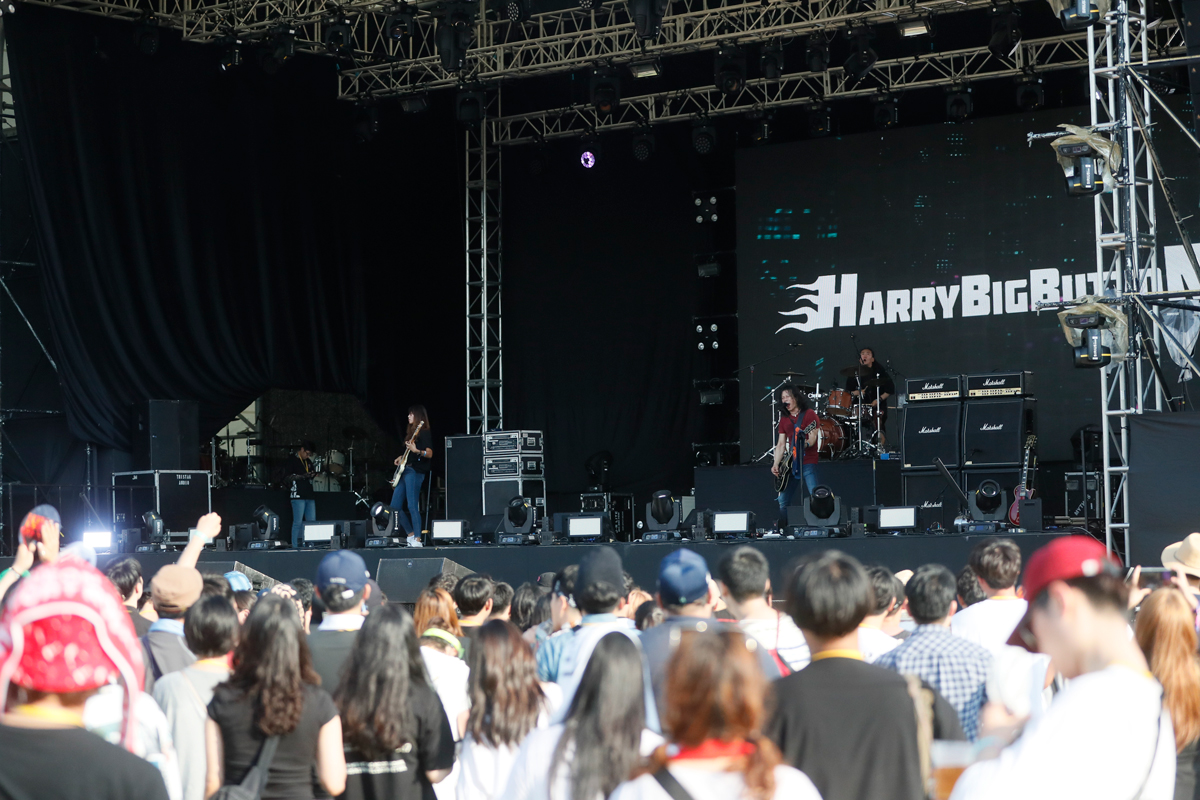
- HarryBigButton, 2019 Pentaport Rock Festival

Background information
- Origin: South Korea
- Genres: Hard Rock
- Years active: 2011-present
- Labels: HardBoiledMusic
- Members: Lee Sung Soo; Woo Suk Jae; Choi Bo Kyung
- Website: harrybigbutton.com

HarryBigButton (Korean: 해리빅버튼) is a hard rock trio formed in 2011 in Seoul, Korea by a former guitarist of Korean thrash metal band Crash Lee Sung Soo. The band's current lineup are Lee Sung Soo (vocals, guitar), Woo Suk Jae (bass) and Choi Bo Kyung (drums).The debut EP album titled Hard ‘N’ Loud was released in 2011. In 2012, they began to receive public attention after appearing in a national TV-station KBS “Top Band”. The band participated in the official program of the 30th anniversary diplomatic relations between Korea and Russia. Their album King's Life charted on Gaon at No. 77.

== Band members ==
Current members

- Lee Sung Soo (Korean: 이성수) − guitars, vocals (2011−present)
- Woo Suk Jae (Korean: 우석제) − bass (2022−present)
- Choi Bo Kyung (Korean: 최보경) − drums (2011-2012, 2022–present)

== Discography ==
=== Albums and EPs ===
- Hard'N'Loud (2011)
- King's Life (2012)
- Perfect Storm (2014)
- Man Of Spirit (2017)
- Dirty Harry (2020)

=== Singles ===
- Control (2013)
- Social Network (2015)
- Man Of Spirit (2015)
- Snowball Project Vol.1 (2016)
- Wild East Blues (2019)
- Kukushka (Viktor Tsoi) (2019)
- Dawn Of The Dead (Collab version) (2020)
- Thelma & Louise (2022)

== Performance history ==
- Jisan Valley Rock Festival (2012), Radiohead, The Stone Roses etc.
- Supersonic (2013), Pet Shop Boys, John Legend etc,
- Pentaport Rock Festival (2014), Travis, Kasabian etc,
- Jisan Valley Rock Festival (2015), Motorhead, Foo Fighters etc,
- Jisan Valley Rock Festival (2017), Major Lazer, Gorillaz etc,
- 2019 Rock in Russia concert
- Pentaport Rock Festiva (2019)
- MU:CON (2020) byKOCAA

== Chart ==
Year	Chart name	Album title	Chart position
2012	Gaon Album Chart	King's Life	77
