= Oathean =

South Korean black metal band

- Also known as: Odin
- Origin: Seoul, South Korea
- Genres: Black metal, death metal (early)
- Years active: 1993–present
- Labels: Jusin Productions, The End
- Members: Kim Do-Su; Dhemian Frost; Lee Hee-Doo
- Past members: Lim Ji-Nah; Bak Yong-Hee; Bak Jong-Ho; Jung Young-Sin
- Website: myhome.shinbiro.com/~oathean/home.html

Oathean is a South Korean black metal band formed in 1993, originally named after Norse god Odin. They went on hiatus and changed their name three years later. Oathean's lyrics deal with sadness and depression. Their style is influenced by folk metal, and incorporates Korean world music and traditional Korean instruments, such as the haegeum and daegeum.

Founding member Do-Su Kim started and runs Jusin Productions, which releases much of the band's output, and has joined in for sessions with Holymarsh.

== Members ==
=== Current members ===
- Kim Do-Su – vocals, rhythm guitar (1993–present)
- Dhemian Frost – bass (2009-2013, 2014–present)
- Lee Hee-Doo – lead guitar (2010, 2019–present)

=== Former members ===
- Bak Jae-Ryeon – drums
- Lee Soo-Hyeong – drums
- Jeon Seong-Man – drums
- Heo Ji-Woo – drums
- Baek Hyeon – lead guitar
- Kim Dong-Hyeon – drums
- Kim Woon – drums
- Kim Min-Suk – lead guitar
- Kim Hee-Tae – lead guitar
- Lee Bun-Do – lead guitar
- Lee Jun-Hyeok – lead guitar
- Kim Min-Su – bass, vocals
- Park Yong-Hee – bass
- Song Seong-Hwan – bass
- Moon Jong-Su – bass
- Gu Hae-Ryeong – keyboards
- Jung Young-Sin – drums

=== Session members ===
- Naamah − drums
- Son Ji-Yeong − haegeum
- Lee Yu-Gyeong − daegeum
- Kim Eun-Yeong − daegeum
- Kim Deok-Su − keyboards
- Gwak Ju-Lim − vocals

== Discography ==
Studio albums

- The Eyes of Tremendous Sorrow (1998)
- Ten Days in Lachrymation (2001)
- Fading Away into the Grave of Nothingness (2004)
- Regarding All the Sadness of the World (2008)
- Oathean (2010)
- The Endless Pain and Darkness (2021)

EPs

- When All Memories Are Shattered (2000)

Demos

- Demo (1997)

Compilations

- The Last Desperate 10 Years as Ever (2003)
- The Eyes of Tremendous Sorrow + As a Solitary Tree Against the Sky (2005)
