= Prep (band) =

English indie pop band

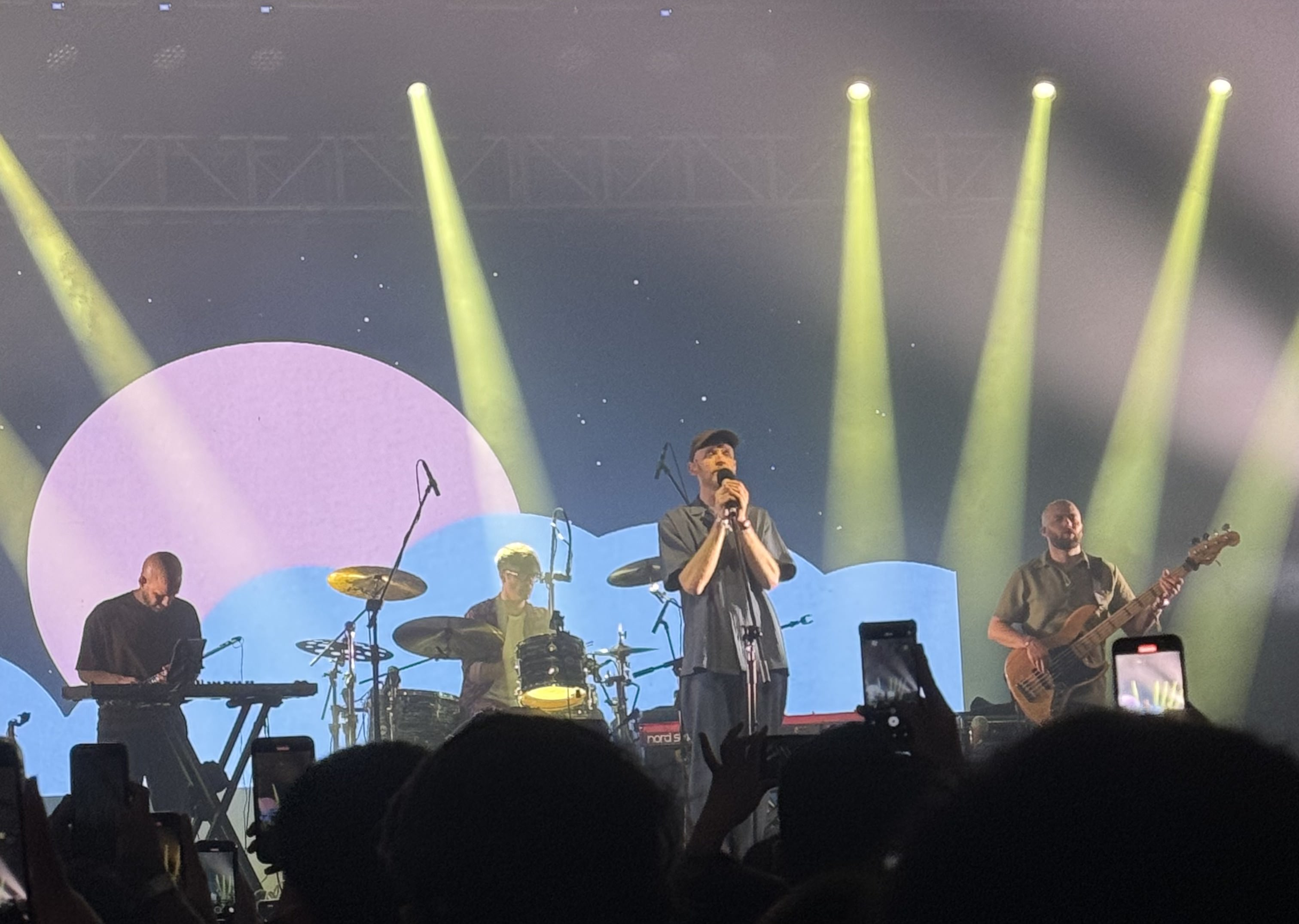
- Prep in Manila in 2024.

Background information
- Origin: London, England
- Genres: Indie pop; R&B; jazz; hypnagogic pop
- Years active: 2015–present
- Label: Bright Antenna
- Members: Tom Havelock; Llywelyn ap Myrddin; Guillaume Jambel; Daniel Radclyffe
- Website: prepofficial.com

Prep (stylised as PREP) are an English indie pop band formed in London in 2015. The band consists of vocalist Tom Havelock, keyboardist Llywelyn ap Myrddin, drummer Guillaume Jambel, and producer Daniel Radclyffe. Prep's music incorporates elements of 1980s pop, R&B, and jazz, creating a distinctive sound that has garnered attention since their debut.

The band's initial release, Futures EP in 2016, featured the single "Cheapest Flight", which received positive feedback online. Additional EP releases included the singles "Who's Got You Singing Again" and "Line by Line", which were noted for their production quality and musical style. These early success set the stage for their first full-length self-titled album, released in 2020.

In 2024, Prep released their second album, The Programme, featuring collaborations with artists such as Eddie Chacon and Phum Viphurit. The album was noted for its refined production and exploration of various musical influences. Prep's work is characterised by its smooth sound and themes of love and personal reflection, drawing on a wide range of musical inspirations.

== History ==
=== 2015–2020: Formation and early years ===
Prep was formed in London in 2015 by Tom Havelock, Llywelyn ap Myrddin, Guillaume Jambel, and Dan Radclyffe. The band members have diverse musical backgrounds; Havelock is a singer-songwriter, Myrddin specialises in classical music composition, Jambel works as a house DJ, and Radclyffe produces hip hop tracks. This eclectic mix contributes to their distinctive sound, blending elements of 1980s pop and contemporary R&B.

The band's name was inspired by a phrase commonly used by ap Myrddin. According to Havelock, ap Myrddin would often ask the group before performances or significant events, "Have you done your prep?" The term, a short form of "preparedness" or preparation, eventually became the name of the band.

Their debut EP, Futures, released in 2016, featured the single "Cheapest Flight", which gained traction online. The song's smooth production and catchy melodies resonated with a wide audience, helping the band establish a strong online presence and a growing fanbase. The band's early success was marked by extensive online streaming and positive reception from music critics, setting the stage for future projects.

=== 2020–2024: PREP ===
In 2020, Prep released their first self-titled full-length album. The album was well-received, praised for its sophisticated production and nostalgic sound that echoed 1980s pop.

The success of the album was bolstered by the band's live performances. Prep embarked on several tours, both in the United Kingdom and internationally, playing at various music festivals and venues such as the Java Jazz Festival in Indonesia and the Wanderland Music and Arts Festival in the Philippines. Their live shows were characterised by tight musicianship and engaging stage presence, further cementing their reputation in the indie pop scene.

=== 2024–present: The Programme ===
Following the success of their debut album, Prep continued to build on their momentum. In 2021, they announced their second studio album, The Programme, which was released in 2024. The band recorded most of the album in quarantine during the COVID-19 pandemic, with production handled by Renaud Letang. The album features collaborations with artists such as Eddie Chacon and Phum Viphurit, showcasing their ability to blend various musical influences seamlessly.

The Programme received critical acclaim for its polished production and innovative sound. The album's release was followed by a series of tours and live performances, further expanding their global fanbase.

In addition to their studio albums, Prep has continued to release new singles and EPs, maintaining a steady presence in the indie pop scene. They have also engaged in various collaborations, expanding their musical reach and exploring new stylistic territories. Their continued innovation and commitment to their craft have solidified their position as a notable band in the genre.

== Artistry ==
Prep's creative process is highly collaborative, with each member contributing their expertise to the songwriting and production. The band often starts with jam sessions in the studio, where they develop initial ideas. These ideas are then refined and layered to achieve a polished final product. Their diverse musical backgrounds allow them to experiment and innovate, resulting in a sound that is both unique and cohesive.

Prep's music is characterised by a blend of hypnagogic 1980s pop (including city pop), R&B, and jazz influences. Their early tracks, such as "Cheapest Flight" and "Who's Got You Singing Again", showcased a vintage-inspired sound combined with elements of contemporary R&B and electronica. This combination provided a fresh take on familiar styles, resonating with a wide audience. Prep's sound is often described as "retrofuturistic", combining lush synths, groovy basslines, and other sophisticated arrangements. Some listeners have described their style as "yacht rock" or "marina pop", evoking images of carefree moments, such as long drives or watching sunsets. Lyrically, their songs explore themes of love, longing, and personal reflection, delivered with a sense of wistfulness and emotional depth.

The band's influences are eclectic, drawing from a wide range of musical styles and artists. They cite Bobby Caldwell, Steely Dan, Daft Punk, Mac DeMarco, Jamiroquai, Bill LaBounty, Boz Scaggs, Thundercat, Tyler, the Creator, and Maurice White as major influences, alongside jazz and classical composers like Bill Evans and Maurice Ravel. This diverse range of inspirations is reflected in their music, which combines elements of classic and contemporary sounds.

== Band members ==
- Tom Havelock – lead vocals, lyricist, producer (2015–present)
- Llywelyn ap Myrddin – keyboards, synthesiser, backing vocals, producer (2015–present)
- Guillaume Jambel – drums, backing vocals, producer (2015–present)
- Daniel Radclyffe – lead guitar, backing vocals, producer (2015–present)

Touring musicians

- James Ahwai – bass guitar (2015-present)
- Michael Lesirge – flute, saxophone, keyboards
- Oliver Weston - flute, saxophone, keyboards
- Jon Shenoy - flute, saxophone, keyboards

== Discography ==
=== Studio albums ===
Title	Details
Prep	Released: 30 October 2020; Label: Bright Antenna; Format: CD, LP, digital download
The Programme	Released: 7 June 2024; Label: Bright Antenna; Format: CD, LP, download

=== Extended plays ===
Title	Details
Futures	Released: 14 October 2016; Label: B3SCI, Jeffrey International; Format: CD, 12", cassette, download
Cold Fire	Released: 4 May 2018; Label: Jeffrey International; Format: CD, 12", download
Line by Line	Released: 9 November 2018; Label: Jeffrey International; Format: CD, 12", download
Back to You	Released: 16 September 2022; Label: Bright Antenna; Format: Download, streaming

=== Singles ===
List of singles, year of release, and parent album
Title	Year	Album / EP
"Cheapest Flight"	2016	Futures
"Who's Got You Singing Again"	2016	Futures
"Cold Fire"	2018	Cold Fire
"Snake Oil" (featuring Reva DeVito)	2018	Cold Fire
"Don't Look Back" (featuring Shownu and So!YoON!)	2018	Line by Line
"Line by Line" (featuring Cory Wong and Paul Jackson Jr.)	2018	Line by Line
"Over" (featuring Anna of the North)	2020	Over
"Love Breaks Down"	2020	Over
"Pictures of You"	2020	PREP
"On and On"	2020	PREP
"Carrie"	2020	PREP
"The Kid"	2022	Back to You
"Speaking Silence"	2022	Back to You
"15th Floor"	2022	Back to You
"As It Was" (Harry Styles cover)	2022	—N/a
"One Day at a Time"	2023	—N/a
"Open Up"	2023	The Programme
"Getaway" (featuring Phum Viphurit)	2024	The Programme
"Call It" (featuring Eddie Chacon)	2024	The Programme

== See also ==
- List of indie pop artists
