= Adoy =

South Korean band

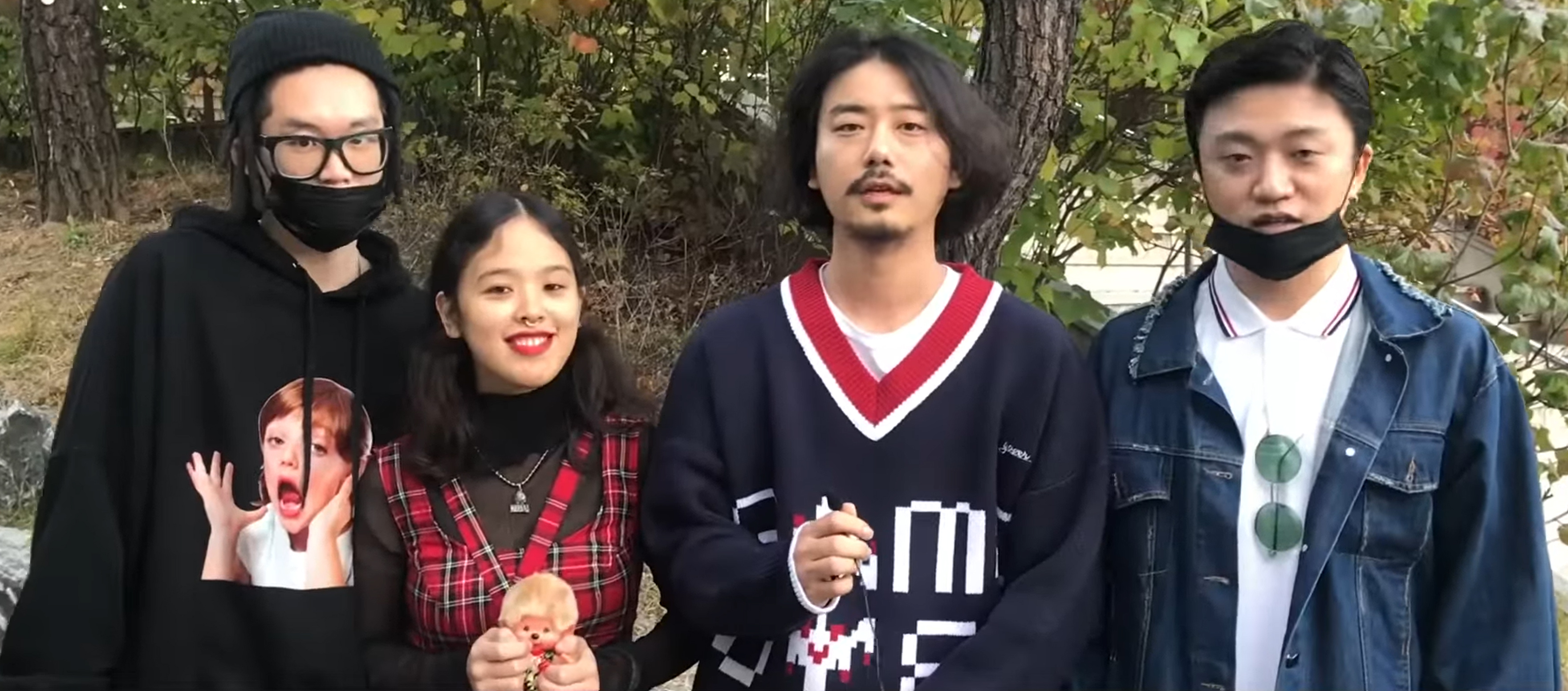
- ADOY in 2018

Background information
- Origin: Seoul, South Korea
- Genres: Indie Pop; Indie Rock
- Years active: 2017–present
- Label: Angel House
- Members: Juhwan Oh; Zee; Geunchang Park; Dayoung Jeong
- Website: https://adoyofficial.com

Adoy (stylized as ADOY; Korean: 아도이), is a South Korean band formed in 2017. The band debuted on May 17, 2017, with their EP Catnip and has since released three additional EPs and two studio albums. The band has received positive attention in the Korean indie scene, including multiple nominations at the Korean Music Awards and a win at the Seoul Music Awards.

== History ==
In 2016, Juhwan Oh and Zee, then label mates on the Korean record label Fluxus Music, teamed up to form a synth based indie rock project. They soon recruited Dayoung Jeong and Geunchang Park to fully form the quartet. The name Adoy was inspired by Juhwan's cat, Yoda (named after the Star Wars character Yoda), whom the band spent time with during the production of their first release. The band name is simply Yoda spelled backwards. In 2017, Adoy released their first EP Catnip to positive response.

In 2018, the band released their second EP, Love, which included the minor hit song, "Wonder". Following this release, Adoy played their first shows abroad in Thailand, Singapore, Philippines, Hong Kong and Taiwan. Following the success of the EP, the band won the Special Judges Awards at the 2019 Seoul Music Awards.

In late 2019, Adoy released their first full-length release VIVID. The supporting tour across Asia was canceled due to the COVID-19 pandemic, but the group still performed numerous online shows over the next few years, including a live performance broadcast for LUCfest 2020. After their third EP, her, released in 2021, the band toured Asia and the US.

In 2023, Adoy released an EP titled us (sometimes called Remake or Remake EP), a collection of other musicians including PREP, Phum Viphurit and Sunet Rollercoaster covering their favorite songs from Adoy. Later that same year, the band released their second album, PLEASURES.

== Members ==
- Juhwan Oh (오주환) : Vocals
- Zee (지) : Synths, Vocals
- Geunchang Park (박근창) : Drums
- Dayoung Jeong (정다영) : Bass, Vocals

== Discography ==
=== Studio albums ===
Title	Details	Peak chart positions	Sales
Title	Details	KOR	Sales
VIVID	Released: November 22, 2019; Label: Angel House, Tune Up; Formats: CD, digital download, vinyl	36	
PLEASURES	Released: August 31, 2023; Label: Angel House, Formats: digital download		

=== Extended plays ===
Title	Details	Peak chart positions	Sales
Title	Details	KOR	Sales
Catnip	Released: May 17, 2017; Label: Angel House; Formats: LP, CD, digital download	57	—N/a
Love	Released: June 14, 2018; Label: Angel House; Formats: LP, CD, digital download	40	—N/a
her	Released: Aug 15, 2021; Label: Angel House; Formats: LP, CD, digital download		—N/a
us	Released: June 14, 2023; Label: Angel House; Formats: LP, CD, digital download		—N/a

== Awards and nominations ==
Award ceremony	Year	Category	Nominee(s)/work(s)	Result	Ref.
2018	Korean Music Awards	Best Modern Rock Track	'Grace'	Nominated	
2019	Korean Music Awards	Best Pop Track	'Wonder'	Nominated	
2019	Korean Music Awards	Best Modern Rock Album	ADOY - [Love]	Nominated	
2019	Seoul Music Awards	Judge Special Award	Adoy	Won	
