= Eastern Sidekick =

South Korean indie rock band

- Origin: Seoul, South Korea
- Genres: Garage rock
- Years active: 2010 - 2016
- Labels: Fluxus Music
- Past members: Ko, Hangyul(고한결); Oh, Juhwan(오주환); Bae, Sanghwan(배상환); Ryu, Inhyuk (류인혁); Park, Geunchang(박근창); Ko, Myungchul(고명철)
- Website: www.easternsidekick.com

Eastern Sidekick (Korean: 이스턴 사이드킥) was a South Korean indie rock band formed in 2010, but they officially debuted under Fluxus Music includes Clazziquai, Urban Zakapa in 2013. The band consisted of Juhwan Oh on vocals, Hangyul Ko on lead guitar and main songwriter, Sanghwan bae on bass guitar, Inhyuk Ryu on guitars and Geunchang Park on drums.

== Career ==
Members says the band's name came from they were thinking Asia and that is where 'Eastern' came from, They added 'Sidekick' because they were going for something out of the form. Eastern Sidekick initiated by Hangyul and Myungchul from circle activity, then other members joined. Accordingly, every song's title and lyrics written in Korean to have a strong Eastern atmosphere only composed and written by Hangyul as the band's leader. Eastern Sidekick is known for their own oriental garage rock sound well. They also became known to Korean indie music scene by won 'Rookie Of The Years' of Olleh Music Indie Awards, EBS Hello Rookie 2010 and Hyundai Card Music: Indie Band TV commercial. In addition they having gigs in live house in Hongdae where most of Korean indie bands playing in Seoul, they had many performances in overseas music festival such as Music Matters Live 2013 in Singapore and Summersonic 2013 in Japan not only Korean domestic music festival such as Pentaport Rock Festival 2011, 2012 and Green Plugged Festival. The band was awarded Weekly Champion in Fuji TV's global band music contest show 'Asia Versus', and also supported Jang Keun-suk's second album showcase and concert tour in Japan as a session musician. However, the band decided to disband in May 2016.

== Members ==
- Hangyul Ko – Lead Guitar (2010–present)
- Juhwan Oh – Lead Vocals (2010–present)
- Sanghwan Bae – Bass guitar (2010–present)
- Inhyuk Ryu – Guitar (2010–present)
- Geunchang Park – Drums (2014–present
- Myungchul Ko - Drums (2010–2014)

== Discography ==
=== Studio albums ===
Title	Album details	Peak chart positions
Title	Album details	KOR
The First	Label: Fluxus Music; Released: August 17, 2012; Formats: CD, digital download; Track listing: 1. Inefficient Man (다소 낮음); 2. Fight For Rainbow (무지개를 위한 싸움); 3. The Exciting Song (흥겨운 노래); 4. Mad Rooster (화난 수탉); 5. Buggered Man (떡); 6. Natural Wind (자연풍); 7. At Home on Holiday (쉬는 날 방안); 8. Incandescent Lamp (백열램프); 9. There Comes And Goes The Thirsty Dog (저기 목마른 개 왔다 간다); 10. In Front of Your House (그 집 앞); 11. Mustang (무스탕)	82
Total Reflection (굴절률)	Label: Fluxus Music; Released: October 29, 2015; Formats: CD, digital download; Track listing: 1. The Car ( 차); 2. Dirty Weather >(식은 쇠); 3. Business Man (장사); 4. Digger (낮); 5. 88 (88); 6. Sloopy Night (묽은 밤); 7. Teeth and Sweat (이빨과 땀); 8. 88 ver.2 (이빨과 땀); 9. Total Reflection< (굴절률); 10. Sea and Room (당진); 11. Mustang (무스탕)	67

=== Extended plays ===
Title	Album details	Peak chart positions
Title	Album details	KOR
Hammer Lane (추월차로)	Label: Fluxus Music; Released: September 11, 2013; Formats: CD, digital download; Track listing: 1. Sloppy Night (묽은 밤); 2. Teeth and Sweat (이빨과 땀); 3. Seoul< (서울); 4. Monochrome Cartoon City (흑백만화도시)	44

=== Music videos ===
Year	Title	Director
2009	"Teeth and Sweat" (이빨과 땀)"	Super 10 Bit
2010	"Fight For Rainbow" (무지개를 위한 싸움)"	Super 10 Bit
2013	"Mustang" (무스탕)"	NYLON Korea
2015	"Digger" (낮)"	UNID-IT
