= The Inspector Cluzo =

French rock group

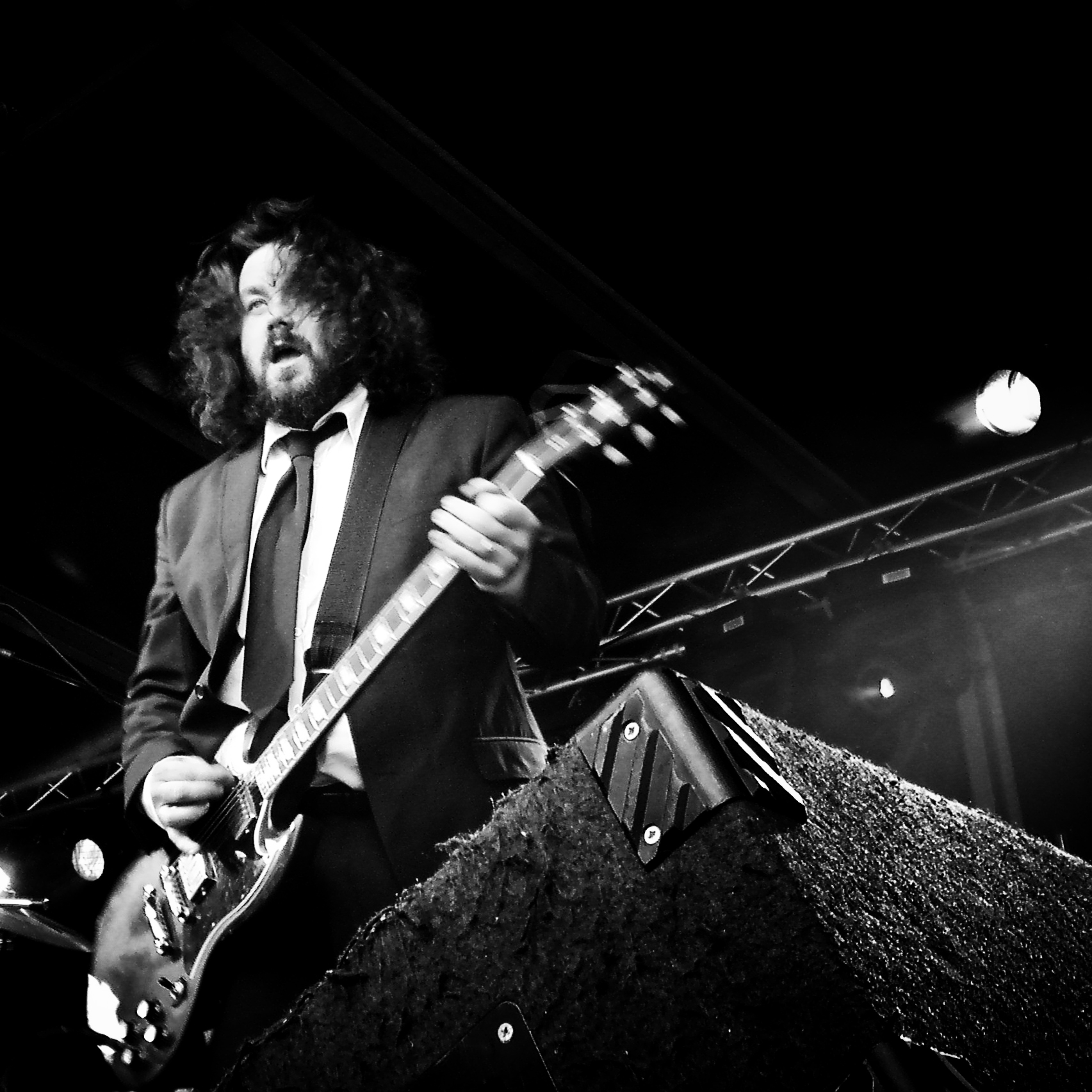
- The Inspector Cluzo performing at Kade Rock

Background information
- Origin: Mont-de-Marsan, Landes, France
- Genres: Blues; groove; rock
- Years active: 2007-present
- Labels: FucktheBassPlayer Records; Universal; Ter a Terre
- Members: Laurent Lacrouts; Mathieu Jourdain
- Website: www.theinspectorcluzo.com

The Inspector Cluzo is a French rock group from Mont-de-Marsan, Landes, France that formed in 2007. The group is composed of Laurent "Malcolm" Lacrouts on the guitar and vocals and Mathieu "Phil" Jourdain on the drums. Both are Mont-de-Marsan natives and former members of the band Wolfunkind.

The name of the group was proposed by their friend and Fishbone singer Angelo Moore and references the character Inspector Clouseau who appears in the Pink Panther movies.

== History ==
Lacrouts and Jourdain met during their first year of physics studies in Mont de Marsan. After playing in the band Wolfunkind, the two formed a duo.

Their first EP was recorded in 2008 and produced at Jet Studio in Brussels by Stephane Kraemer. The same year, they released their first full-length eponymous album, which included two notable songs: "Two Days" and "F*ck the Bass Player". The album was covered in French and International press, including in Japan, where they participated in the Fuji Rock Festival.

In April 2010, they released their second album, The French Bastards. In February 2012, their third, The 2 Mousquetaires, was released inside a comic book as its official jacket. By 2016, they released two more albums: Gasconha Rocks and Rockfarmers and had performed in more than 800 concerts, visited 44 countries, and sold 100,000 albums.

In 2018, they recorded their seventh album, We the People of the Soil in Nashville with Vance Powell, marking the duo's tenth anniversary.

At the beginning of 2020, the group released a "best-of" unplugged album entitled Brothers In Ideals, recorded during their American tour. In January 2023, their eighth album, entitled Horizon, was released. Both were produced by Vance Powell.

The band is the subject of a book by Romain Lejeune and illustrated by Marc Large.

== Farming & approach ==
The duo runs a 15 hectare organic family farm in Gascony called "Lou Casse" ('the oak' in the Gascon language). The farm, which they bought in 2013, is self-sustaining. On the farm they produce organic wheat and organic corn with their own free seeds, raise gray geese and other plants and animals. While they consider farming their focus, they split their time between the farm and their work as musician-composers, spending six months on each.

The duo work to apply the tenets of agroecology on their farm and teach it to local children and the greater public, for example by including lectures on the subject as the opening act for their concerts.

The duo, in music and farming, pursue the goals of being autonomous and independent. They manage their own label F*ckthebassplayer Records, which, since 2012, has been the distributor of Ter a Terre records in France, also of their own making. Besides the farm and their music, the duo manages, with family and trusted friends, concert bookings, publicity, recording, sales of their music and farm produce.

== Musical style ==
Music magazine Les Inrockuptibles when writing about their album The French Bastards, called their style a fusion between funk rock and heavy metal, noting that the band does not have a bass player. Writing about the same album Crossbeat noted that the band's style is a fusion, at moments reminiscent of AC/DC and Led Zeppelin. In 2011, an article about the Art Rock festival described the duo's style as being funk'n'roll, somewhere between the Red Hot Chili Peppers and AC/DC.

Their live performances are characterized as energetic and lively, accomplishing with just two musicians a large sound that transforms between blues-rock and hard-rock.

The duo sings in English.

== Discography ==
- (2008) Cluzo, EP, (Ter a Terre)
- (2008) The Inspector Cluzo, CD, (Ter A Terre)
- (2010) The French Bastards, CD, (Ter A Terre)
- (2012) The 2 Mousquetaires, CD, (Ter A Terre/FucktheBassPlayer Records)
- (2013) Gasconha Rocks, CD, (FucktheBassPlayer Records)
- (2016) Rockfarmers, CD, (FucktheBassPlayer Records)
- (2018) We the people of the soil, CD, (FucktheBassPlayer Records)
- (2020) Brothers in Ideal - We the People of the Soil, Unplugged (Universal Music Division, Virgin Records Distribution Deal)
- (2023) Horizon, CD, (FucktheBassPlayer Records)
