= Phum Viphurit =

Thai singer-songwriter

Phum Viphurit วิภูริศ ศิรินทิพย์ (ภูมิ)
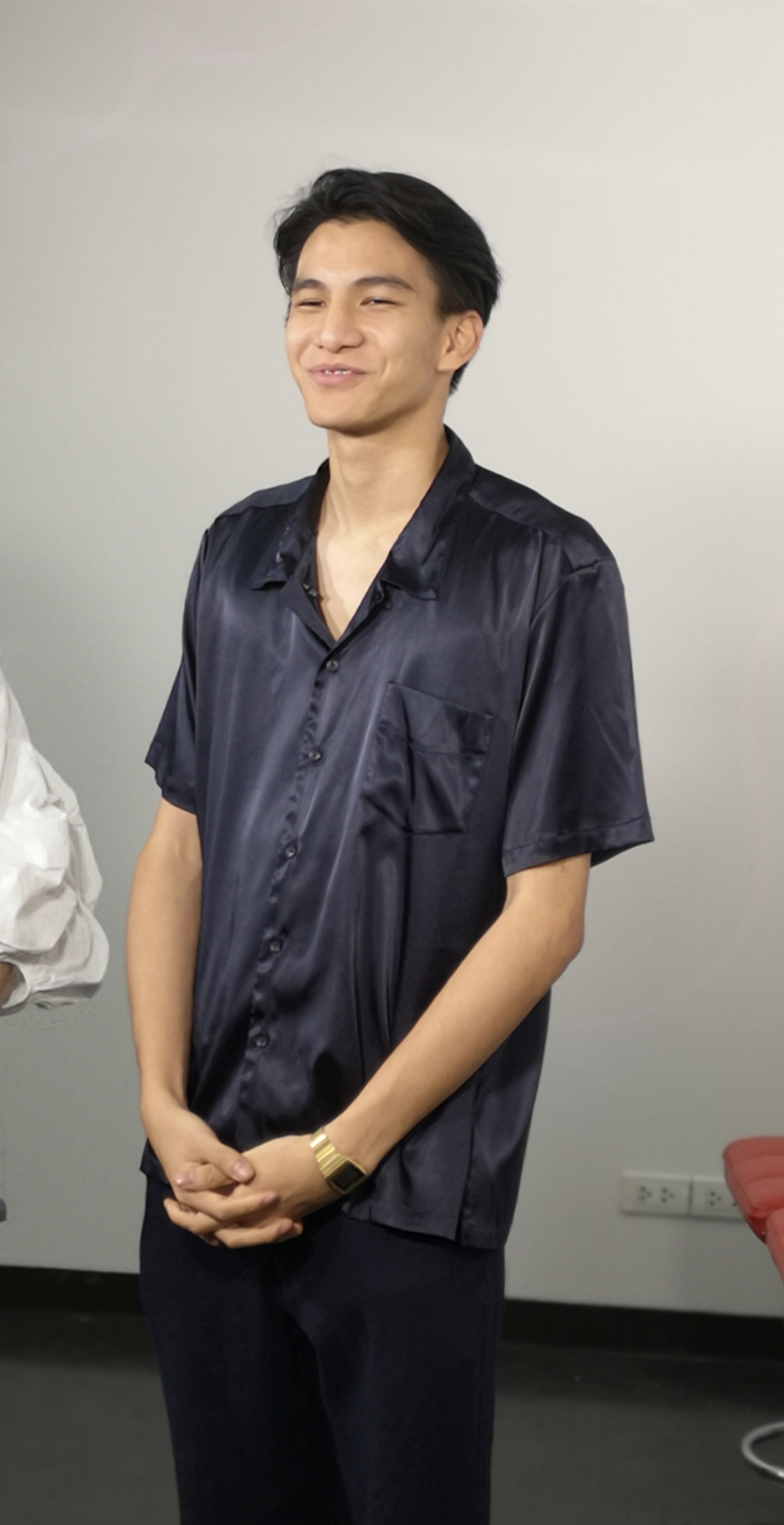
- Phum at VERY TV Thailand

Background information
- Also known as: Phum
- Born: August 16, 1995 (age 31); Bangkok, Thailand
- Genres: Indie folk, neo soul
- Occupations: Singer, composer, musician
- Instruments: Vocal, drums, guitar
- Years active: 2014–present

Viphurit Siritip (Thai: วิภูริศ ศิริทิพย์, born 1995), known by his nickname Phum (ภูมิ), is a Thai singer-songwriter. He achieved international fame in 2018 from his single "Lover Boy". His music demonstrates influences of various genres, especially neo soul.

== Biography ==
Viphurit was born in Bangkok, Thailand. His father is an architect, while his mother is a graphic designer. Viphurit moved to Hamilton, New Zealand when he was 9. While in New Zealand, he got his first instrument; a drum which he had desired to have since he was little. However, Viphurit was forced to stop playing the drums and turned to guitar since the drum sound was said to be disturbing the neighbours. Viphurit moved back to Thailand when he was 18 to study at Mahidol University International College.

In Thailand, Viphurit became known on from his original and cover songs on YouTube. He released his debut album Manchild in 2017. His following two singles, "Long Gone" and "Lover Boy", earned him international recognition as their music videos spread online. He toured internationally in 2018, performing in Hong Kong, Taiwan, South Korea, Japan, Poland, Germany, England, France, Switzerland, Italy, the Netherlands, the United States, Indonesia, Malaysia, Philippines and Singapore. He released the single "Hello Anxiety" in 2019 and toured the United States a second time.

In 2024, Viphurit introduced Paul Vibhavadi, an alter ego represented as an anthropomorphic sloth, as part of a new creative direction in his music and storytelling. The character debuted with the single "The Other Side" and became the central figure of the EP Paul Vibhavadi Vol. 1. According to Viphurit, adopting the persona allowed him to move beyond writing solely from personal experience and instead develop fictional narratives and characters. He has described the project as providing greater creative freedom while exploring themes through storytelling rather than autobiography.

== Discography ==
=== Studio albums ===
Title	Album details
Manchild	Released: 4 February 2017; Label: Rat Terrier, Earthtone Records, Lirico; Formats: CD, LP, digital download
The Greng Jai Piece	Released: 31 January 2023; Label: Rats Records, Lirico; Formats: CD, LP, digital download

=== Extended plays ===
Title	Details
Bangkok Balter Club	Released: September 8, 2019; Label: Rat Records, Linco; Formats: CD, digital download, vinyl
Phum Viphurit on Audiotree Live	Released: October 15, 2019; Label: Audiotree; Formats: Digital download

=== As lead artist ===
Single	Year	Album
"Adore"	2014	Manchild
"Trial and Error"	2015	Manchild
"Run"	2016	Manchild
"Strangers in a Dream"	2016	Manchild
"The Art of Detaching One's Heart" (featuring Jenny & The Scallywags)	2016	Manchild
"Long Gone"	2017	Manchild
"Lover Boy"	2018	Bangkok Balter Club
"Hello, Anxiety"	2019	Bangkok Balter Club
"Softly Spoken"	2020	Bangkok Balter Club
"Wings" (So!YoON!, Phum Viphurit)	2020	Non-album single

=== As featured artist ===
Single	Year	Album
"On the Sunny Side of the Street" (陽の当たる大通り, Hi no Ataru Ōdōri) (Maki Nomiya featuring Phum Viphurit)	2022	World Tour Mix
"STeAKFACe** ᕙ(⇀‸↼‶)ᕗ" (1999 WRITE THE FUTURE featuring Phum Viphurit and Masiwei)	2024	hella

=== Music Videos ===
List of music videos, showing year released and director
Title	Year	Director(s)
"Lover Boy"	2018	Jean Khamkwan
"Hello, Anxiety"	2019	Khamkwan Duangmanee
"Softly Spoken"	2020	Phum Viphurit; Tahkonpath Rojanavanit
"Welcome Change"	2023	Kuttiya Kanchanasopawong

=== Guest appearances ===
List of non-single guest appearances, showing other artist(s), year released and album name
Title	Year	Other artist(s)	Album
"Lover Boy 88"	2018	88rising, Higher Brothers	Head in the Clouds
"Dream Away"	2018	Stuts	Eutopia
"Strange Land"	2019	88rising, NIKI	Head in the Clouds II
"Sunkissed (Phum Viphurit Remix)"	2020	Khai Dreams	Sunkissed (Remixes)
"A New Day"	2021	Nulbarich	New Gravity
"Baby - Phum Viphurit Remake"	2023	Adoy	us
"Getaway"	2024	PREP	The Programme
"Night Drive"	2026	STUTS, Julia Wu	With U
