= Vassline =

South Korean metalcore band

- Origin: South Korea
- Genres: Metalcore, post-hardcore, melodic hardcore
- Years active: 1996–present
- Labels: GMC Records
- Members: Choi Hyeon-Jin; Kangto Lee; Shin Woo-Seok; Jo Min-Yeong; Lee Gi-Ho
- Past members: Bak Jin; Top; Dab Shib Rian; Yoon Hong-Gu
- Website: www.facebook.com/vassline

Vassline (Hangul: 바세린) is a metalcore band from South Korea that formed in 1996. Their 2004 album, Blood of Immortality, won the award for Best Rock Album at the 2005 Korean Music Awards.

== Members ==
- Choi Hyeon-Jin – drums, percussion
- Kangto Lee – guitars
- Shin Woo-Seok – lead vocals
- Jo Min-Yeong – guitars, backing vocals
- Lee Gi-Ho – bass, backing vocals

Former

- Bak "Tiger Jin" Jin – guitars
- Top – guitars
- Dab Shib Rian – guitars
- Yoon Hong-Gu – drums, percussion

== Discography ==
Studio albums

- The Portrait of Your Funeral (2002)
- Blood of Immortality (2004)
- Permanence (2007)
- Black Silence (2013)
- Memoirs of the War (2017)

EPs, demos, and splits

- Bloodthirsty (2000)
- Missing Link (2001)
- The Splitsphere (split w/ Myproof (JAPAN)) (2006)

Compilations

- Club "Hardcore" 1st Edition (1997)
- 3000 Punk (1998)
- One Family Vol.1 (1999)

== Awards ==
Year	Award	Category	Nominated work	Result
2005	Korean Music Awards	Best Rock Album	Blood of Immortality	Won
