= Oh! Brothers =

South Korean rock band

Oh! Brothers 오! 부라더스
- Origin: Seoul, South Korea
- Genres: Rock and roll; doo-wop; rhythm and blues; rockabilly
- Instrument(s): Guitar, bass guitar, saxophone, drums
- Years active: 1998 - present
- Labels: Lo-fi Cavare Sound
- Members: Lee Seong-mun; Choi Seong-su; Kim Jeong-wung; Lee Seong-bae; An Tae-jun
- Past members: Lim Jan-heui; Ju Hyeon-cheol; Yun Ju-hyeon
- Website: www.ohbrothers.com

Oh! Brothers (Korean: 오! 부라더스) is a South Korean rock band that formed in 1998. The band was originally named the 'Orgasm Brothers', but prior to debuting in 2001 had been renamed to its current name. Since 1998, the band has performed in clubs in the Hongdae area, as well as on the streets and in subway stations.

== Members ==
=== Current members ===
- Lee Seong-mun (이성문), bass guitar
- Choi Seong-su (최성수), vocal
- Kim Jeong-wung (김정웅), guitar
- Lee Seong-bae (이성배), saxophone
- Ahn Tae-joon (안태준), drums

=== Former members ===
- Lim Jan-heui (임잔희), guitar
- Ju Hyeon-cheol (주현철), guitar, vocal
- Yun Ju-hyeon (윤주현), drums

== Discography ==
=== Major releases ===
- Myeongnang Twist (The Merry Twist, Korean: 명랑 트위스트), released in July 2001
- Let's-A-Go-Go, released in January 2002
- One & Two & Rock & Roll, released on July 9, 2004
- How Much Gettin' Very Hot?, released on August 9, 2007

=== Singles, etc. ===
- hippin' hopping' twistin' , released in 2001 (in cassette tape only)
- Kick Off The Jams (Korea/Japan Independent Label Festival 2001), released in 2001
- New Attack 2002, released in 2002
- Heuihanhage Nuni Majeun Geunyeo (Feat. Giggles) (Somehow Strangely She And I Got A Crush On Each Other, Korean: 희한하게 눈이 맞은 그녀), released on October 24, 2006
- To You Sweetheart Aloha (tribute to Hula Girls, a 2006 Japanese film starring Yū Aoi), released on February 7, 2007
