= Broken Valentine =

South Korean alternative rock band

- Also known as: 6. August (2002—2004); B. August (2004—2007)
- Origin: Seoul, Korea
- Genres: Alternative rock, post-grunge
- Years active: 2002–present
- Labels: BV Entertainment; Rolling Cultureone; YDCT Music
- Members: Sunghwan; Jihwan; Kyungjun; Junho; Taehee
- Past members: Van; Ansu; Koopa
- Website: brokenvalentine.modoo.at

Broken Valentine (Korean: 브로큰 발렌타인) is a South Korean alternative rock band formed in 2002. The band's current lineup consists of bassist and leader Sunghwan, guitarist Jihwan, lead vocalist Kyungjun, lead guitarist Junho, and drummer Taehee. The band's original lineup included lead vocalist Van, lead guitarist Ansu, and drummer Koopa.

The band is notable for their 2011 appearance on the Korean television program Top Band.

== History ==
=== 2007—2014: Formation and breakthrough on Top Band ===
Broken Valentine was formed in 2002 under the name "6. August". After Van and Ansu left the band 2004, they renamed themselves "B. August" with member Sunghwan performing lead vocals. In March 2007, the band officially changed their name to "Broken Valentine", with members Van and Ansu returning as lead vocalist and guitarist respectively.

In December 2008, the reunited band participated in the "Asian Beat" band competition (Korean round) sponsored by YAMAHA, and became the finalist to represent Korea in the following year's Asian Beat Grand Finale held in Hong Kong. In February 2009, Broken Valentine won the Grand Prize and the Best Composer Award (Byun G) with the song "Answer me", which became their most popular track. Broken Valentine thus became the first team in Asian Beat's history to ever win two awards in the same year.

In 2009, Broken Valentine released their first EP album, the self-produced Calling You. To celebrate this release, the performed a showcase concert, and continued to perform at local gigs and in support of other bands throughout South Korea. However, due to the nature of the South Korean music scene, with limited outlets for independent bands, they found difficulty achieving nationwide recognition, so in 2011, they tried out for the television program Top Band broadcast by the Korean Broadcasting System, a Survivor-like reality show wherein bands compete against each other. Broken Valentine was considered an early favorite, and made it to the round of 16 on the show, but was eliminated at this round by the band "Toxic."

Following their elimination, Broken Valentine held their fourth exclusive concert "Royal Straight Flush" on October 14, 2011 to a crowd of more than 500 people. In December of that year, the band released their new single "Down," which involved all the members writing, composing, and producing. In 2012, they released their first full album, Shade. The following year, they released second full-length album, Aluminum. The album's title track 'Aluminum' was talked about by many music fans after the death of vocal member 'Van.'

=== 2015—present: Van's death and line-up changes ===
On August 3, 2015, it was reported that Broken Valentine's vocal, Van (Kim Kyung Min), had died from drowning, after he went to play in the waters with his friends. At the time of his death, the band had been working on their third album Sad, which was set to release following the conclusion of Koopa's military service in September of that year. Van's funeral procession was held on August 5, 2015. A tribute performance in memory of Van was held on November 18, 2016, with the remaining band members in attendance.

After a year of no activities, Broken Valentine reunited as a trio to release a new EP titled Project. Nabla, with Noh Dae-geon of Bursters and Heo Gyun of Hash providing vocals for the album. In an interview with Osen following the album's release, the band confirmed that Ansu had chosen to leave the band during discussions regarding their future after Van's death. The band also held a fan meeting and concert the following day to promote the new album. On December 9, 2017, the band held their solo concert "Night Plan" with a number of guests performing lead vocals.

On February 10, 2019, Broken Valentine added new members Kim Kyung-jun and Park Jun-ho to the band. On September 21, Broken Valentine returned with their solo concert, "Four Ours," which featured newly composed music. One week later, they released their new song "Not Yours."

On December 29, 2022, the band released their third studio album, 3. The band began album promotions at Nodeul Island Live House on January 14, 2023. On February 26, 2023, it was announced that Koopa would be leaving the band after their Seokchon Lake performance on March 25.

== Style ==
Broken Valentine writes and composes their own songs, mostly written by Byun G and Van. Their music style can be categorized as alternative rock and post-grunge.

== Members ==
- Sunghwan (성환) — Bass (2002–present), Lead vocals (2004–2007)
- Jihwan (지환) — Lead guitar (2002–present)
- Kyungjun (김경준) — Lead vocals (2019–present)
- Junho (박준호) — Guitar (2019–present)
- Taehee (조태희) — Drums (2023–present)

=== Past ===
- Van (반) — Lead vocals (2002–2004; 2007–2015; his death)
- Ansu (안수) — Lead guitar (2002–2004; 2007–2016)
- Koopa (쿠파) — Drums (2002–2023)

== Discography ==
=== Studio albums ===
List of studio albums, with selected details, chart positions, and sales
Title	Album details	Peak chart positions			Sales
Title	Album details	KOR	US Heat	US World	Sales
Shade	Released: May 10, 2012; Label: Rolling Cultureone; Formats: CD, digital download; Track listing: 1. Royal Straight Flush; 2. Shade (Title); 3. M.K. Dance; 4. This Time; 5. Noname; 6. You Never Mind; 7. Down; 8. Dual-log; 9. L I F E 10. What U Need; 11. Noname(Piano Ver.)	—	—	—	
Aluminum	Released: June 4, 2013; Label: Rolling Cultureone; Formats: CD, digital download	—	—	—	
3	Released: December 29, 2022; Label: BV Entertainment; Formats: CD, digital download	—	—	—	

=== Extended Plays ===
Songs captured with "" is translated title.

List of extended plays, with selected details, chart positions, and sales
Title	Album details	Peak chart positions			Sales
Title	Album details	KOR	US Heat	US World	Sales
Answer Me! Is This What You NEED??	Released: April 2007; Label: Independent; Formats: CD, digital download; Track listing: 1. What You NEED (Vocal Sunghwan ver.); 2. L I F E (Vocal Sunghwan ver.); 3. "If I open my eyes" (Vocal Sunghwan ver.); 4. Answer Me (Vocal Sunghwan ver.); 5. Alien (Vocal Van ver.); 6. "Just like this as is" (Vocal Van ver.); 7. Run (Vocal Van ver.)	—	—	—	
Calling You	Released: December 22, 2009; Label: BV Entertainment; Formats: CD, digital download; Track listing: 1. This time reprise 2. "The sea in my old drawer" (cover of song by the band Panic); 3. M.K. Dance; 4. "Song of the fossil" 5. Answer me	—	—	—	
Project. Nabla	Released: January 13, 2017; Label: BV Entertainment; Formats: CD, digital download; Track listing: 1. Trust (Intro); 2. Justice For Them; 3. noname Pt. 2; 4. Run (feat. Byun Sung-hwan); 5. Justice For them (instrumental); 6. noname Pt. 2 (instrumental); 7. Run (Instrumental)	—	—	—	

=== Singles ===
- "Alien" (as B.August) (2005)
- "Down" (2011)
- "RIDE" (2013)
- "Not Yours" (2019)
- "Crash It, Burn it, Break It" (2022)
- "Is It Love?" (2024)
- "Please Don't Fall" (2025)
- "Body and Soul" (2025)

== Awards ==
- August 2006, received 2nd Prize at Music Contest for National University Students sponsored by Suwon City
- November 2008, won Grand Prize at YAMAHA Asian Beat Korea Final
- February 28, 2009, won Grand Prize and Best Composer Award at YAMAHA Asianbeat Grand Final (in Hong Kong)
