= Hathaw9y =

South Korean indie pop band

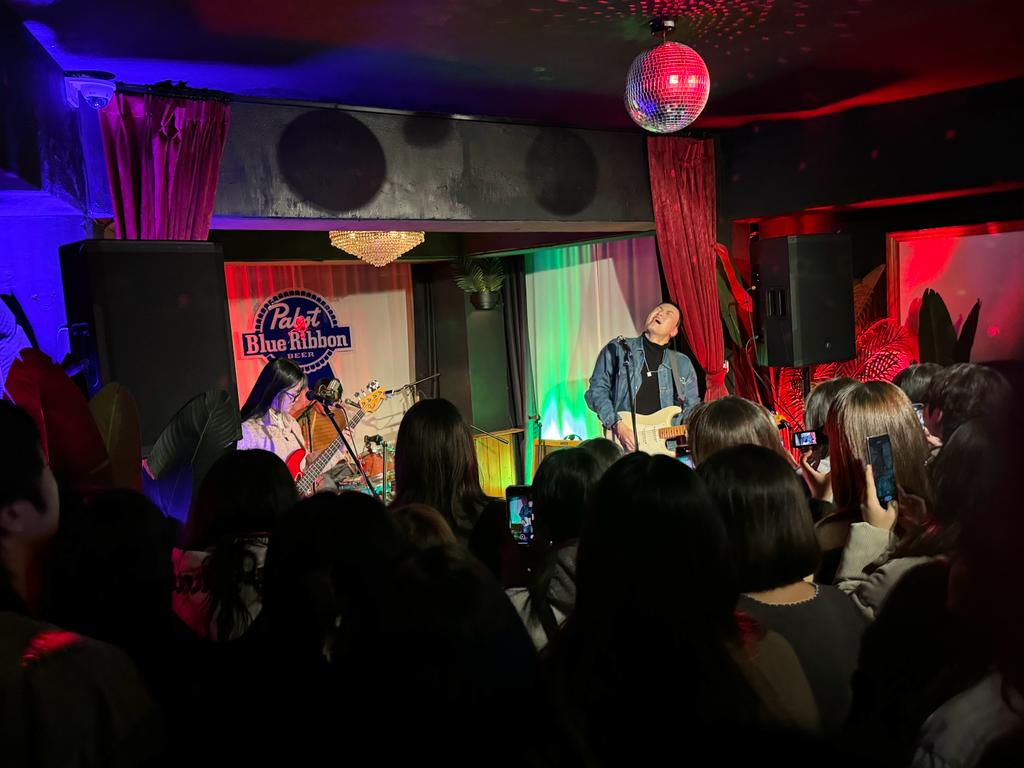
- Hathaw9y in 2023

Background information
- Origin: Busan, South Korea
- Genres: Indie pop; indie rock; dream pop
- Years active: 2020-present
- Label: Poclanos
- Members: Kang Kiwi; Choi Seyo; Lee Teukmin

Hathaw9y (Korean: 해서웨이) is a South Korean indie pop band. The band currently consists of Kang Kiwi, Choi Seyo and Lee Teukmin. Since their formation in 2020, the band has released a studio album Essential (2023).

== Background ==
Hathaw9y was formed in Busan in 2020. Kang Kiwi and Choi Seyo were members of the same band before, and Lee Teukmin learned to play guitar from Kang Kiwi. The band is named after Donny Hathaway. They released their EP Boy Loves Hayley in November. In 2021, they released an EP Woo Scribbling Night, and they joined performances with Gong Joong Geu Neul, Cadejo and Platform Stereo.

In 2022, they performed at the Pentaport Rock Festival, and in August they released an EP Love Sand with Bosudong Cooler. They appeared on The EBS space and were introduced as a rising band in Busan along with Say Sue Me. In 2023 they released their first studio album, Essential.

== Discography ==
=== Studio albums ===
- Essential (2023)

=== EPs ===
- Boy Loves Hayley (2020)
- Woo Scribbling Night (2021)
- Sweet Violet Flame (2022)
- Love Sand (2022) (with Bosudong Cooler)
