= Romantic Punch =

South Korean rock band

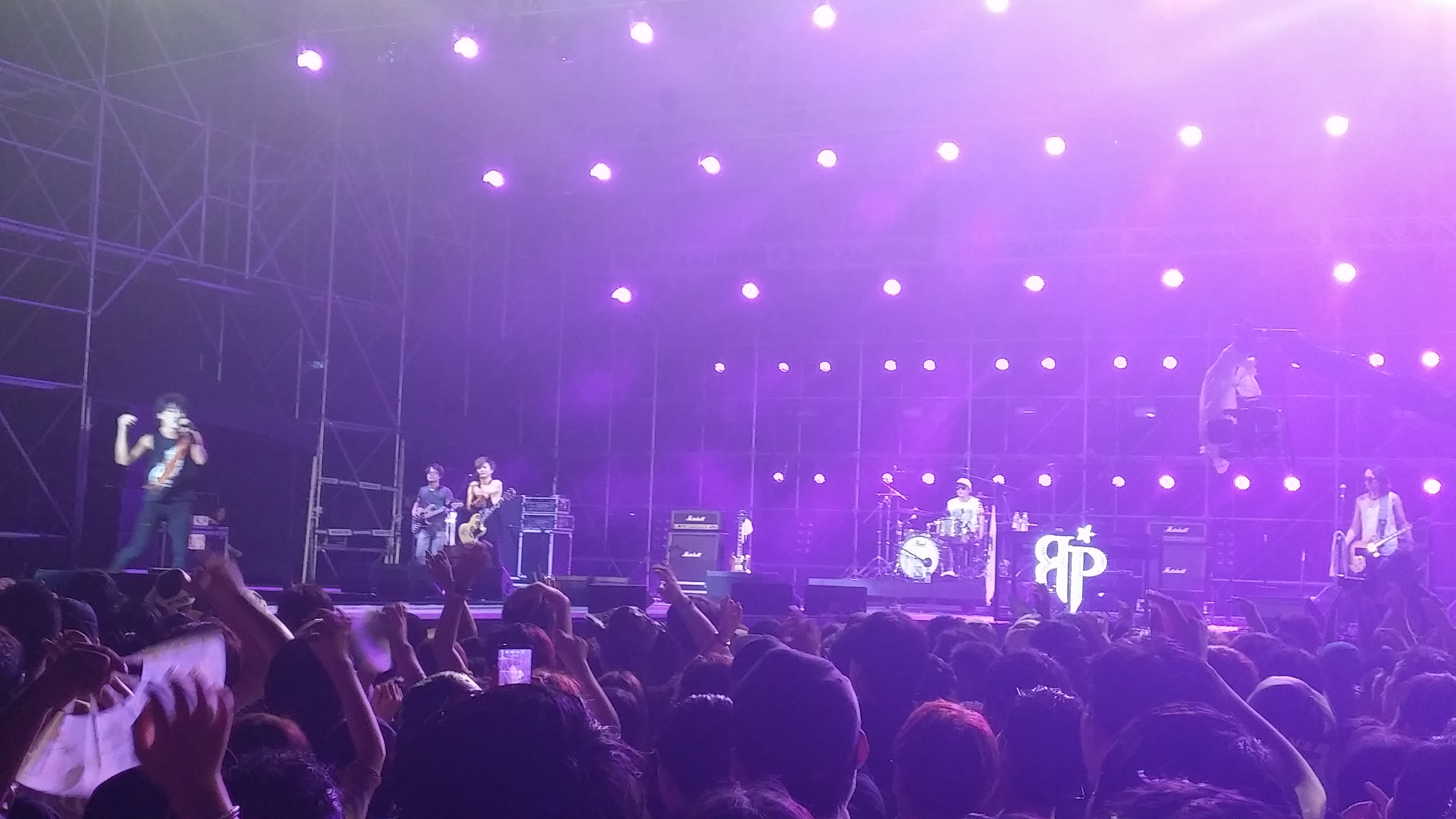
- Busan Rock Festival, August 9, 2015

Background information
- Origin: South Korea
- Genres: Rock
- Years active: 2003–present
- Labels: Mnet Media; Mirrorball Music
- Members: In-hyuk (vocal); Konchi (guitar); Lazy (guitar); Tricky (drum)
- Past members: Hana (bass); Cha Je-hyeon (drum)
- Website: Cyworld Official Club Site

Romantic Punch is a rock band based in South Korea, which currently has four members. The band was formed in July 2003 as a Christian indie band "WA★DISH" (Wash the Dishes) and changed its name to "Romantic Punch" in May 2009. They originally had five members, but, Park Hana (the group's bassist), who was on pregnancy leave at the time, left the group on March 9, 2015. No specific reason or explanation was given for her departure.

Besides playing at various rock festivals, they perform their solo concert titled "Romantic Party" at regular intervals. Their fan club is expanding continuously and currently has more than ten thousand members.

In 2014 they have staged more than 1000 street concerts in various locations and regions in Korea.

Their management agency is "Queen Entertainment" based in Seoul, Korea. In January 2013, they signed a contract with "Kiss Entertainment" as their management office in Japan, but after 2013, the band have had no major activities in Japan.

== Members ==
- In-hyuk (Full Name: 배인혁, Birthday: June 9) - Vocal
- Konchi (Full Name: 강호윤, Birthday: November 30) - Guitar
- Lazy (Full Name: 권영환, Birthday: August 10) - Guitar
- Tricky (Full Name: 고용진, Birthday: March 11) - Drum (2009-)

== Discography ==
=== Album ===
- Midnight Cinderella (2010)
- Glam Slam (2013)
- SOS(2020)

=== Mini-album ===
- Bright Sunlight Day (햇살 밝은 날) (2004) - released album from "WA★DISH" age
- Saturday Night (Feb. 28, 2006) - released album from "WA★DISH" age
- Romantic Punch (2009)
- It's Yummy (2011)
- Silent Night (2012)

== Award ==
- 2003 - MBC "Korea Music Festival" Amateur Rock Concert - 1st place
- 2011 - olle "Music Indie Award" Artist of the Month - Awarded
- 2011 - KB Year-End National Rock Festival Contest - Grand Prize
- 2012 - KBS2TV "Top Band Season 2" - 2nd Place

== Live performances ==
- 2009 to Present - Romantic Punch solo concert "Romantic Party" (53rd Romantic Party in May 2014)
- 2009 to Present - Street performance over 1000 times
- 2009 - 2009 Pentaport Rock Festival
- 2010 - 2010 Jisan Valley Rock Festival
- 2012 - 2012 Pentaport Rock Festival
- 2012 - Super Sonic 2012
- 2013 - Green Plugged 2013, 2013 Pentaport Rock Festival

Also playing in various music events

- In Japan, they had live performances in Okayama (2013) and Tokyo (2012, 2013).

== Major tie-up ==
- 2009 - SBS "Green Saver" - theme song
- 2012 - NARUTO SD - theme song (*In Korea only)
- 2012 - Mabikino - OST
- 2012 - tvn drama "My Cute Guys" OST "Ready-Merry-Go!"

== Appearances and media ==
- 2009 - EBS "Space Compathy"
- 2012 - KBS "Top Band Season 2"
- 2013 - KBS "7080 Concert", Mnet "MUST", etc.
- 2014 - MBC "SHOW CHAMPION"
