= Thornapple (band) =

South Korean indie rock band

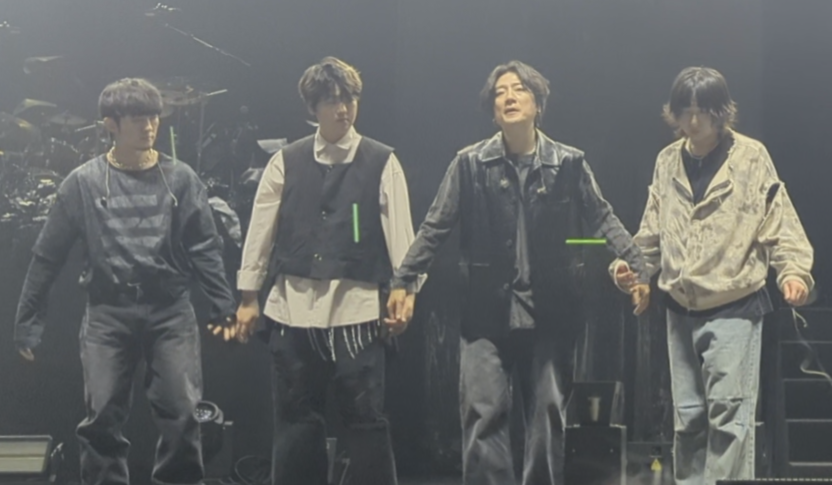
- Thornapple Band

Background information
- Origin: Seoul, South Korea
- Genres: Indie rock; alternative rock
- Years active: 2009–present
- Label: Happy Robot Records
- Members: Yoon Seonghyeon; Hong Dongkyoon; Bang Joseph
- Past members: Oh Jeongmin; Han Seungchan; Shim Jaehyeon

Thornapple (Korean: 쏜애플) is a South Korean indie rock band. The band currently consists of Yoon Seonghyeon, Hong Dongkyoon and Bang Joseph. Since their formation in 2009, the band has released three studio albums: I Often Stammer and Forget the Way to Sleep (난 자꾸 말을 더듬고 잠드는 법도 잊었네) (2010), Strange Weather (이상기후) (2014) and Enlightenment (계몽) (2019).

== History ==
Thornapple was formed in 2009. They released their debut studio album I Often Stammer and Forget the Way to Sleep (난 자꾸 말을 더듬고 잠드는 법도 잊었네). Overall, they were greatly influenced by Radiohead in music, and they also mentioned in interviews that Radiohead is a role model for both musicality and behavior. They said that the ever-changing appearance deserves to be emulated as a creative company. In 2010, and after the release, the members joined the military. While they were in the military, the album began to gain popularity among indie fans. They appeared on Mnet's TV show, The Era of the Band (밴드의 시대), and they signed a contract with Happy Robot Records.

In 2014, they released their second studio album Strange Weather (이상기후). Kim Banya of IZM described the album as "Like a deadly poisonous apple, the temptation of the album continues. If you take a bite of this album, you will suffer from dizziness and irritating abnormal symptoms." They released the EP Capital Disease (서울병) in 2016, and had a national tour.

In 2018, they had a solo concert, but it was hastily changed to an instrumental concert due to vocal cord nodule from vocalist Yoon Seonghyeon. With him completely cured, a new concert was held in December. In 2019, they released their third studio album Enlightenment (계몽), which was nominated for Best Modern Rock Album at the Korean Music Awards.

In 2023, they released the EP Animal (동물). In an interview with IZM, they said, "Enlightenment is like the end of what we've been talking about. We had a lot of thoughts about what else we could talk about now, but as we went through a mentally difficult period, we came up with an abstract image of my next album, and that was the starting point of this album, Animal."

In 2024, the bassist Shim Jaehyeon left the band to pursue a solo career.

In 2026, they released the EP My Century (나의 세기). Their agency MPGM stated that "This EP is a work that features an expanded sound and bold musical experimentation compared to before," adding that, "Starting with the release, we plan to sequentially showcase various content and performances, so we will be able to show a new trend to the fans who have waited for a long time." Thornapple also announced an Extended Play film, available for streaming on CGV on June 10th, 2026 until June 23rd, 2026. The film was performed off the coast of Busan, presenting the "music and mood of the new album" in film format. They held a 'My Century' concert in Seoul on August 15th-16th of 2026 and Busan on August 29th-30th of 2026.

== Discography ==
=== Studio albums ===
- I Often Stammer and Forget the Way to Sleep (난 자꾸 말을 더듬고 잠드는 법도 잊었네) (2010)
- Strange Weather (이상기후) (2014)
- Enlightenment (계몽) (2019)

=== EPs ===
- Capital Disease (서울병) (2016)
- Animal (동물) (2023)
- My Century (나의 세기) (2026)

== Controversy ==
In 2015, the band was involved in a controversy due to a friend of Yoon Seonghyeon disclosing misogynistic remarks the vocalist made in the past, including “I need to leave this country that has a female president,” and “I hate listening to music that smells like uterus.” In the same year, the bassist Shim Jaehyeon uploaded a blog post that included homophobic remarks, such as “It seems as though young people nowadays easily accept homosexuality, and that is a serious problem... That open mind is going to open the door to hell soon."
