= Gate Flowers =

South Korean hard rock band

- Origin: Seoul, South Korea
- Genres: Hard rock
- Years active: 2005-2006, 2008-2015, 2023-present
- Labels: Echobrid
- Members: Park Geunhong; Yeom Seungshik; Lee Insan; Jeon Sangjin
- Past members: Yoo Jaein; Yang Jeongeun

Gate Flowers (Korean: 게이트 플라워즈) is a South Korean hard rock band. The band currently consists of Park Geunhong, Yeom Seungshik, Lee Insan and Jeon Sangjin. Since their formation in 2005, the band has released the studio album Times (2012).

== Career ==
Gate Flowers was formed in 2005 in Seoul, but disbanded in 2006, and reunited in 2008. In October 2009, they were honoured rookies on EBS Space. They released the EP Gate Flowers in 2010. In 2011, they won the Rookie of the Year award at the Korean Music Awards.

They gained huge popularity when they appeared in Korean TV show Top Band in 2011. In 2012, they released their first studio album, Times. And in 2013 they toured the UK.

In 2014 they released the EP Neulcuen Baemn (늙은 뱀), and in 2015 they disbanded.

In 2023, they announced their reunion with new members Lee Insan and Jeon Sangjin. They released a new single, All In. They joined the lineup of the DMZ Peace Train Music Festival.

== Members ==
=== Current members ===
- Park Geunhong – vocals (2005-2006, 2008–2015, 2023-present)
- Yeom Seungshik – guitar (2005-2006, 2008–2015, 2023-present)
- Lee Insan – bass (2023–present)
- Jeon Sangjin – drums (2023–present)

=== Past members ===
- Yoo Jaein – bass (2008-2015)
- Yang Jeongeun – drums (2005-2006, 2008–2015)

== Discography ==
=== Albums ===
- Times (2012)

=== Extended plays ===
- Gate Flowers (2010)
- Neulcuen Baemn (늙은 뱀) (2014)
