= Kim Sa-rang (singer) =

South Korean rock musician (born 1981)

- Born: December 3, 1981 (age 44)
- Origin: South Korea
- Genres: Rock
- Occupations: Singer-songwriter; record producer
- Instruments: Guitar; bass guitar; drums; piano
- Years active: 1999–present
- Labels: SINE Entertainment; Rason Entertainment
- Website: ksarang.net

- Kim Sa-rang
- Hangul: 김사랑
- Hanja: 金仕朖
- RR: Gim Sarang
- MR: Kim Sarang

Kim Sa-rang (Korean: 김사랑; born December 3, 1981) is a South Korean rock singer-songwriter.

== Biography ==
Kim debuted in 1999 with his first album, I Am 18 Years Old, on which he single-handedly took care of the composition, lyrics, arrangement, and instrumentals. After his second album in 2001, Kim retreated from the public eye, though he continued to work in music production and perform occasional live gigs. Kim returned in 2007 with the release of his third album, U Turn. It features ten new songs, mostly leaning towards band sound with a relaxing mood, simple guitar arrangements, and emotionally honest lyrics.

On September 1, 2009, Kim released his EP Behind the Melody, containing five songs.

He performed at the concert "Return" at the beginning of 2017.

== Discography ==
=== Studio albums ===
| Album # | Album Information | Track listing |
|---|---|---|
| 1st | Vol.1 – I Am 18 Years Old (나는 18살이다): Released: November 22, 1999; Language: Korean | 1. Mind Control (Instrumental); 2. Keep The Groove; 3. Mojorida; 4. 4d 5. Go (Instrumental); 6. Feeling; 7. Dream; 8. Promise; 9. Gate (Instrumental); 10. Rain; 11. U 12. Chaos (Instrumental); 13. (Hidden Track) |
| 2nd | Vol.2 – Nanotime: Released: June 21, 2001; Language: Korean | 1. 무죄 (Innocence); 2. 웃어 (Laugh); 3. 신의 이름으로 (In The Name of God); 4. Wack; 5. 떠나 (Leave); 6. D.M.A; 7. M-U=600×[D]; 8. Snob; 9. A.D 10601; 10. 2; 11. 왜? (Why?); 12. 나 (Me); 13. Run; 14. Never; 15. 이룰수 없는 꿈 (Unattainable Dream); 16. Good Night |
| 3rd | Vol.3 – U-Turn: Released: August 21, 2007; Language: Korean | 1. U-Turn; 2. 괜찮아 (It's OK); 3. 히스테리 (Hysteria); 4. 위로 (Consolation); 5. 하루살이 (A Day in My Life); 6. 2등 (Second place); 7. Yellow Planet; 8. Mad AI; 9. Mud Candy; 10. 비오는 날 (Rainy Day) |

=== EPs ===
| EP information | Track listing |
|---|---|
| Behind the Melody: Released: September 1, 2009; Language: Korean | 1. 취중괴담 (Blabbering Under Intoxication); 2. A+; 3. Loser; 4. 일기 (Diary); 5. 취중괴담 (Demo ver.) |

=== Digital singles ===
| Single information | Track listing |
|---|---|
| "Goodbye": Released: July 21, 2010; Language: Korean | 1. Goodbye; 2. Goodbye (Instrumental) |

== Awards ==
| Year | Award-giving body | Category | Work | Result |
|---|---|---|---|---|
| 2007 | Mnet Asian Music Awards | Best Music Video | "Consolation" | Nominated |
