= Block Party Music and Art Festival =

Music festival in Seoul, South Korea

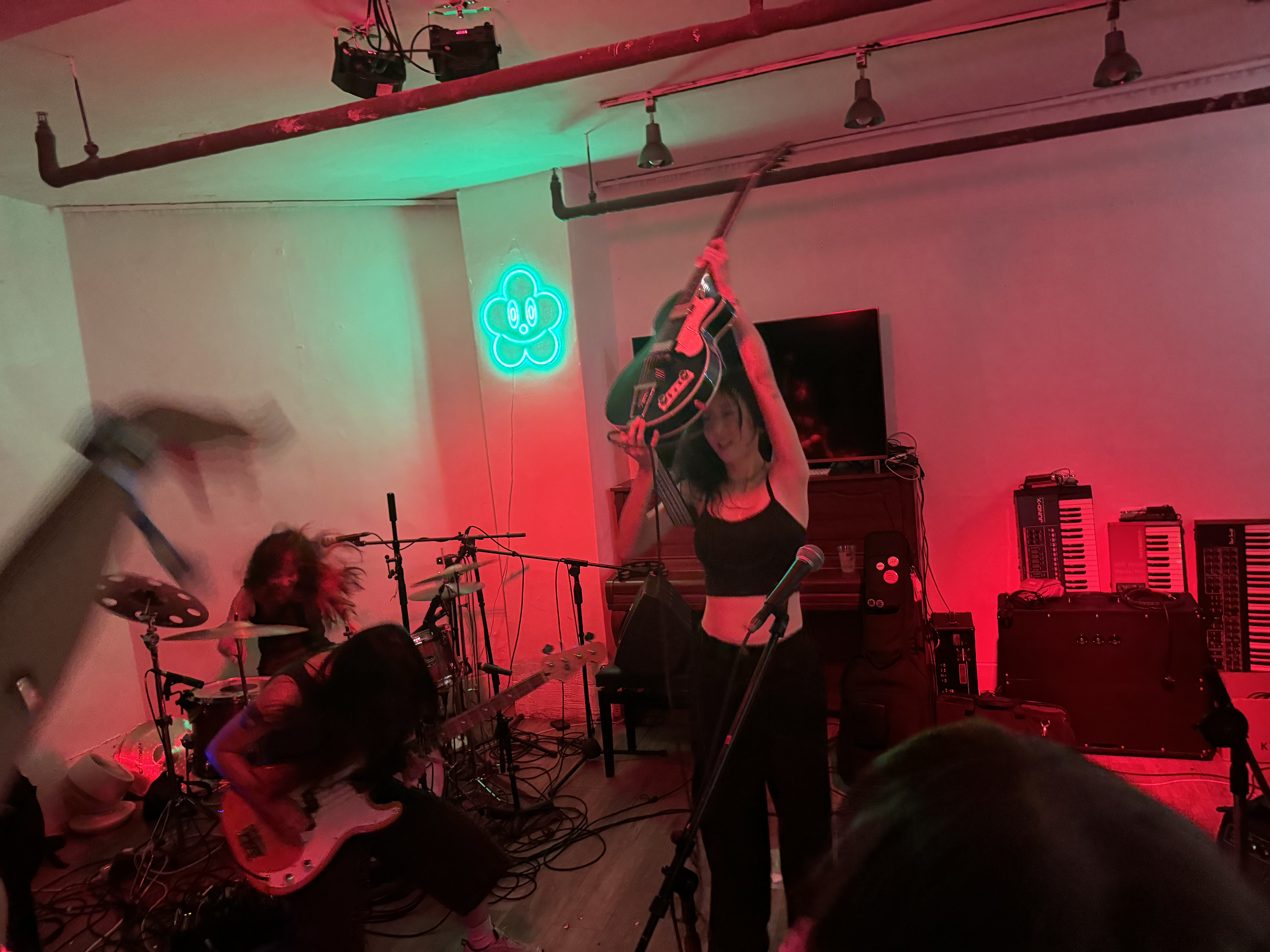
- Punk rock band Sailor Honeymoon performs at Togul Studio, Block Party Music and Art Festival 2024
- Genre: Rock, Alternative rock, Indie rock, World music, Punk rock, Electronic music, Folk music
- Dates: September 11-13, 2026 (Block Party); 19-20 June 2026 (Busan Calling)
- Locations: Haebangchon, Seoul, South Korea (Block Party); Around PKNU, Busan, South Korea (Busan Calling)
- Years active: 2022 - present (Block Party); 2025 - present (Busan Calling)
- Founder: Jamie Finn

Block Party Music and Art Festival (Korean: 블록 파티 뮤직 앤 아트 페스티벌) is a music festival held in Haebangchon, Seoul, South Korea. The festival takes the form of a block party and is held at various pubs and live performance halls in Haebangchon.

The festival first began in 2022. In addition to music performances, the festival includes drag shows, stand-up comedy, wrestling, performance art, magic show, and more. Ten venues joined the festival in 2023 and 12 venues in 2024.

Organiser Jamie Finn announced that 2024 will be the last Block Party festival, and in June 2025 he hosted the similar Debaser Festival, located in Busan with four venues. But he reversed the decision to end the Block Party festival and stated that a new one would take place in September 2025.

In 2026, the name of Debaser Festival was changed to Busan Calling Music Festival.

== Block Party Music and Art Festival ==
=== 2022 ===
In 2022, Block Party announced the first line-up involving Asian Glow, Haepaary, Brokenteeth and Seoul Electric Band. The festival ran for only one day on 24 September, with five venues.

	Saturday, 24 September
The Studio HBC	Tuesday Beach Club; Ultramodernista; Asian Glow; OurR; Haepaary; Love X Stereo; Galaxy Express; Hyangni; Bulgogidisco; GoryMurgy
Pet Sounds	Deadbeat Club; Echo and the Machine; Seoul Electric Band; Ohchill; Billy Carter; Pop Ents
Phillies	Fairy; Brokenteeth; Homtown Buddy; Hongbi; Desert Flower; 18Fevers; Sailor Honeymoon; Incestrual Lust; Yangbans; Cotoba; Oily Rag
The Hidden Cellar	Kana; Nam Kyung Un; Seth Mountain; Jinu Konda; Geoffery Lewis; Sagong; Kowon Tree
Southside Parlor	Ned Darlington; Pylat; Eundohee; Sehee; Jay Marie; OddSong

=== 2023 ===
In 2023, the festival extended the period to two days and announced its first lineup, which includes Kim Oki and Kirara.

	Saturday, 7 October	Sunday, 8 October
Southside Parlor	Chorion; Yoonseung; Big Baby Driver; Kim Il Du; Horea; Jacqui; Sil-A	Rae Bae; Lee Earth; Haepa; Jinaoking; Big Phony; OddSong; XTIE
The Studio HBC	The Jonnybirds; Care Less; Sink to Rise; Pentasonic; Fire Squad; Galaxy Express; Rumkicks; 18Fevers; Gritty Kitty; Equinox	Two Day Old Sneakers; Daisy Gun; ...Whatever That Means; Winningshot; Kim Oki Saturn Ballad; Mandong
Phillies	Anthony Wallace; Jinu Konda; Geoffrey Lewis; Seth Mountain; Truh Sonism; J. Rovia	Seven Sense; Xen; Jeni Wai; Tracy Scott; Humberto; 92Euce
Togul Studio	Nam Kyung Un; MADDYXP; Ejo & the Midgets; Beacon; Drinking Boys and Girls Choir; FØG; Nice Legs; Pop Ents; Yojung; GoryMurgy	Quite Nice Noise; Lizz Kalo; Far East Asian Tigers; Chasedae; Yangbans; 87Dance; Kirara; Animal Divers; Fat Hamster & Kang New
Pet Sounds	Pylat; Frankly; Orange Flavored Cigarettes; Wings of the Isang; Leenalchi; Lucy Valentine; The Sound	Sucozy; Room306; Deadbuttons; Audrey No; Cadejo; Moskva Surfing Club; Goths on the Beach; The Reseters
Living Room	Chunli; Gingerpop; Ovalike; Hex Eyez	Taeyu; Narsis; Malgo; Pablo Winchester; Airbear

=== 2024 ===
In 2024, the festival had 12 venues. The lineup included Minhwi Lee and Sombra and Noridogam, Kim Chunchu's side project, who was a member of Silica Gel.

	Saturday, 21 September	Sunday, 22 September
Southside Parlor	June Green; Kim Mokin; Seonghyeon; Yeoyu and Seolbin; Dave Beck	Jinu Konda; Park Jihui; Summer of Thoughts; Angie
The Studio HBC	Nahua; Care Less; Duoxini; The Geeks; 18Fevers; Pop Ents; LA Galbi; Soumbalgwang; Adios Audio; MADDYXP	Absolute Monsters; Fail Fast; Idiots; Echo & the Machine; Desert Flower; Fat Hamster & Kang New; Yamagata Tweakster; Sombra
Togul Studio	Taeyu; Sucozy; Kontrajelly; Ahn Maru; Narotic; Wah Wah Wah; Goonam; BøJEONG; Kirara	Big Baby Cam; Blue Turtle Land; Hoa; Kusnue; Cacophony; Minhwi Lee; Sailor Honeymoon; Yangbans
Pet Sounds	Rainbow 99; Noridogam; Sally Everywhere; Gyojung; Cottonstick; Verycoybunny; Quite Nice Noise; Bandits; Ohchill	Dabda; Gwon.U; Seoul Electric Band; Texas Flood; Pylat; Johnnivan; Hyangni; Cloud Underground
Boogie Woogie	Honey Jam Sam; Wonho & the Time Machine; Mimi Sisters; Pentasonic; Bibimbeat; Jay Marie; Djembe Cola	Blue Messengers; Concorde; Cadejo; WACK; Meotjinsaeng; Tracy Scott Band
Phillies	Gino Brann; Dave Palmer & Friends; Johnnybirds; Trash and Joongmo; Steve Manning; Soki Yue; Chorion; Sabbaha	Jeni Wai Band; Geoffrey Lewis; Soombee; Sil-A; Ha Heon Jin; Seth Mountain; Tommy Powell

=== 2025 ===
In 2025, the lineup included Jang Pill Soon and TENGGER.

	Saturday, 20 September	Sunday, 21 September
UPLIFT	Claudine; Splish Splash Club; Oh Heejung; Rainbow99; Lunar Isles; Kontrajelly; Big Baby Cam; Fat Hamster & Kang New	Ant Wallace; Xen; Jinu Konda; 1.5Iterations; Jihwi Park; Pretty City Lights; Meeroo Choi; Jisu
Pet Sounds	Blackwoodendoor; Sally Everywhere; DDBB; Omm..; Grand Soul Central; Zzzaam; PCR; Goonam; DJ Emo Kimchi	Men & Them; Ghost Bookstore; Atom Music Heart; Room Sound; Huijun Woo; Narotic; Re:nier; DJ Fuckin' Cat
Subriot HBC	Sabbaha; Care Less; Rux; HarryBigButton; Green Flame Boys; 18Fevers; Asian Spice House; Johnnivan; SOMBRA; 64ksana; DJ Jamie	Sanbo; Pylat; Hammering; Damdamgugu; Crystal Tea; Chip Post Gang; Peach Truck Hijackers; Pop Ents; DJ SUKI
Togul Studio	Mars Hotel; Socialclub Hyangwu; Daisy Gun; Windy City; Freekind; Omar & the Eastern Power	Jang Pill Soon; Lily Eat Machine; Skittles; Xin Seha; Gyojung; Pishu
Blue Moon	Chiyoonhae; Danpyunsun X Boram Lee; Honey Jam Sam; TENGGER; Electric Eels	—N/a
Boogie Woogie	—N/a	Mustang & the Free Lady; Ricotta Jazz Family; Ha Heon Jin; Djembecola; Bibimbeat; Gritty Kitty; Otis Lim
Casa Amigo	The Jonnybirds; Geoffrey Lewis; Jeni Wai	—N/a
Special Stage	Jessica Ko	Yangbans

=== 2026 ===
In 2026, the festival was extended to three days, from 11 to 13 September. The festival collaborated with Fred Perry, and Togul’s name was changed to Fred Perry Togul Stage.

	Friday, 11 September	Saturday, 12 September	Sunday, 13 September
Togul Fred Perry Stage	Music Mantra; Ghost Bookstore; Bulgogi Disco; Leenalchi; Tiger Disco; Luke No-Wave & DJ Jamie	Valo; The Suicide Diary; othersmayforgetyoubutnoti; Mimi Sisters; Oysters; Lang Lee; Sogumm	Kim Il Du; Samui; Varnish; Lucy Valentine; Thama; Moskva Surfing Club; OBSG
Dankyard	—N/a	Glassgirl; Pylat; Kimbanourke; Ye Ram; Ha Heon Jin	1.5Iterations; Moher; English Yangban; Onee; Sunwashere
Subriot HBC	—N/a	Little Boys; Palecistus; Komagens; 18Fevers; Hollow Jan; Hard-Ons; PCR; Snake Chicken Soup; Y2K92; Luke No-Wave & DJ Jamie	Gawthrop; LA Galbi; Kuang Program; Barbie Dolls; Socialclub Hyangwu; 800 Gondomar; Cha Cha and the Cousins
Boogie Woogie	—N/a	—N/a	Kim Oki the Exocist; Crystal Murray; Nahzam Sue & Moonsun; Munan; Cadejo; Ureuk and the Gypsies
UPLIFT	—N/a	Big Baby Cam; Tomatomat; Jessica Ko; Ejae; Sokodomo; Cyrrca; Fat Hamster & Kang New; Ahnmaru; Guinneissik; DJ Jia	Eubene; Xen Sapphire; The Lavelies; Moonsomoon; Ellica; Happy Izoko; Maddyxp; Silly Silky; DJ Yes Yes
Pet Sounds	—N/a	Park Hwi No; BB Bomb; Skasucks; Drinking Boys and Girls Choir; Daisy Gun; QU; Pop Ents; Express!!!; DJ Funkin' Cat	Chip Post Gang; Cultgazer; The Godot; Nokenok; Yajasu; Mineo Kawasaki; Wack
Dialogue	—N/a	Olivia Song; Geoffrey Lewis; Honey Jam Sam	—N/a
Coca-Cola Outdoor Stage	—N/a	—N/a	Sayang; Windy City; J-Tong; Yangbans

== Busan Calling Music Festival ==
=== 2025 Debaser Festival ===
In 2025, Jamie Finn announced the Debaser Festival, a similar form of festival to the Block Party Festival in Busan, running from 6 to 7 June.

	Friday, 6 June	Saturday, 7 June
OL'55	Men And Them; Ilgyne; Barbie Dolls; Daisy Gun; The Vastards; Daddy o Radio	ddbb; othersmayforgetyoubutnoti; Peach Truck Hijackers; Sindosi; Pop Ents; Zero Zero; Kim Oki Luv Luv; Jam Party
Dengue Fever	—N/a	John Givens; Xeuda; Ha Heon Jin; Jinaoking & Tomoya Ogishiba; Gino Brann; Kuna; 9Dimensions; The 4April
Ovantgarde	—N/a	Yajasu; Bandits; Erøtic Wørms Exhibitiøn; Leenalchi; Haepaary; 18Fevers; Soumbalgwang; Tiger Disco; DJ Jamie
Moment	—N/a	Big Baby Cam; Cloud Underground; Airy; Fat Hamster & Kang New; Lionclad

=== 2026 ===
In 2026, he renewed the festival the Busan Calling Music Festival.

	Friday, 19 June	Saturday, 20 June
HQ Gwangan	Bandits; Mosshill; Seoul Electric Band	—N/a
Dengue Fever	—N/a	Liquid Arts Network; Plurals; Smokin' Lee; Tomoya Ogishiba; Kuna; The Jonnybirds; Big Baby Cam; Yamagata Tweakster
Ovantgarde	—N/a	Crystal Tea; Maggie's Garden; End These Days; ddbb; Yajasu; Erøtic Wørms Exhibitiøn; Danpyunsun and the Moments Ensemble; Fat Hamster & Kang New; Kirara; DJ Jamie, DJ Funkin Cat
OL'55	—N/a	Barbie Dolls; Ilgyne; Drinking Boys and Girls Choir; Tetrapod; Beatniq; Roots Redeem; Rumkicks
Nogada	—N/a	Lang Lee; Huijun Woo; Moonsomoon; Daisy Gun

== See also ==
- List of music festivals in South Korea
- List of music festivals
