= Festival the Sub =

Music festival in Seoul, South Korea

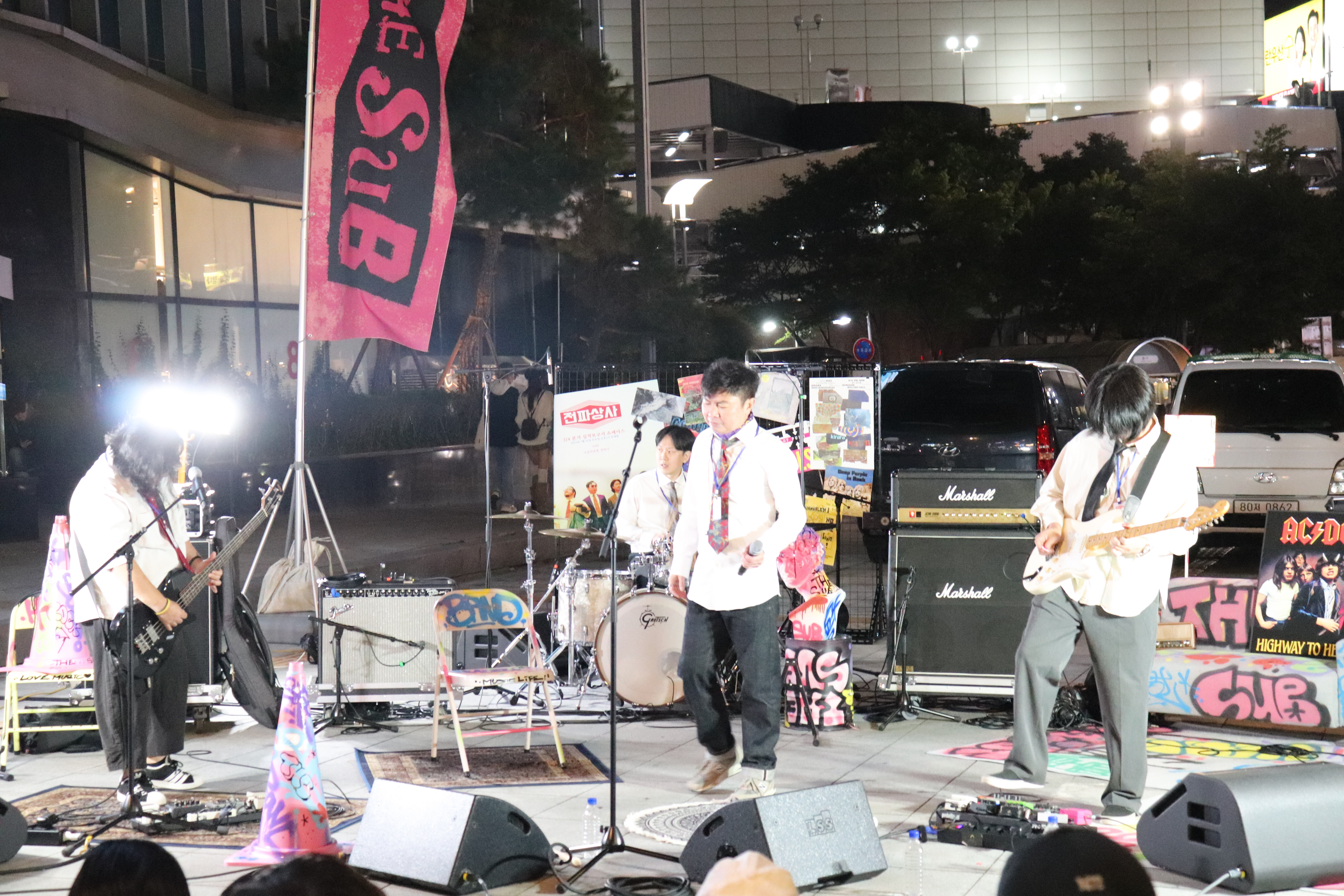
- Zeonpasangsa performing at Festival the Sub 2023
- Genre: Rock, Alternative rock, Indie rock, World music, Punk rock, Electronic music, Folk music
- Dates: October 12, 2025
- Locations: Hongdae street, Seoul, South Korea
- Years active: 2022 - present
- Website: https://www.honguju.com/

Festival the Sub (Korean: 페스티벌 더 서브) is a music festival held in Hongdae street, Seoul, South Korea. The festival has been held for free every year since 2022 to revitalise the subculture of the Hongdae area.

The festival is hosted by the nonprofit Honguju Social Cooperative. Except for those held in Sinchon in 2023, the festival has been held on the street in front of Sangsang Madang, where Theater Zero, a symbol of Hongdae's culture in the past was located in 1998.

== Line-ups ==
=== 2022 ===
In 2022, the Sub the first line-up involving Desert Flower, Say Sue Me, Dabda and Galaxy Express.

	Sunday, 18 September
Sangsang Madang street	Desert Flower; Soumbalgwang; Dabda; Slant; Say Sue Me; Galaxy Express

=== 2023 ===
In 2023, The festival moved to Sinchon, and announced a lineup that included two stages. Bands from South Gyeongsang Province, including Kim Il Du and Seaweed Mustache, joined the lineup.

	Sunday, 8 October
Star Square	Moskva Surfing Club; Seaweed Mustache; Cadejo; Zeonpasangsa
Myeongmul Stage	Yamagata Tweakster; Panema; Kim Il Du; Kirara

=== 2024 ===
In 2024, under the subtitle "DIY Independent Festival" the festival announced a talk session between lineups and music critics.

	Sunday, 22 September
Sangsangmadang Street	Amateur Amplifier; Danpyunsun & The Moments Ensemble; GoryMurgy; Drinking Boys and Girls Choir; Asian Chairshot; Dabda; HarryBigButton
Talk Session	Kim Yoonha; Ha Bakguk; Danpyunsun; Jeong Jiyeon

=== 2025 ===
In 2025, they announced a lineup that included Green Flame Boys and Leenalchi.

	Sunday, 12 October
Sangsangmadang Street	Adios Audio; Far East Asian Tigers; Green Flame Boys; Duoxini; Fat Hamster & Kang New; Leenalchi

== See also ==
- List of music festivals in South Korea
- List of music festivals
