= DMZ Peace Train Music Festival =

South Korean annual music festival held in Cheorwon

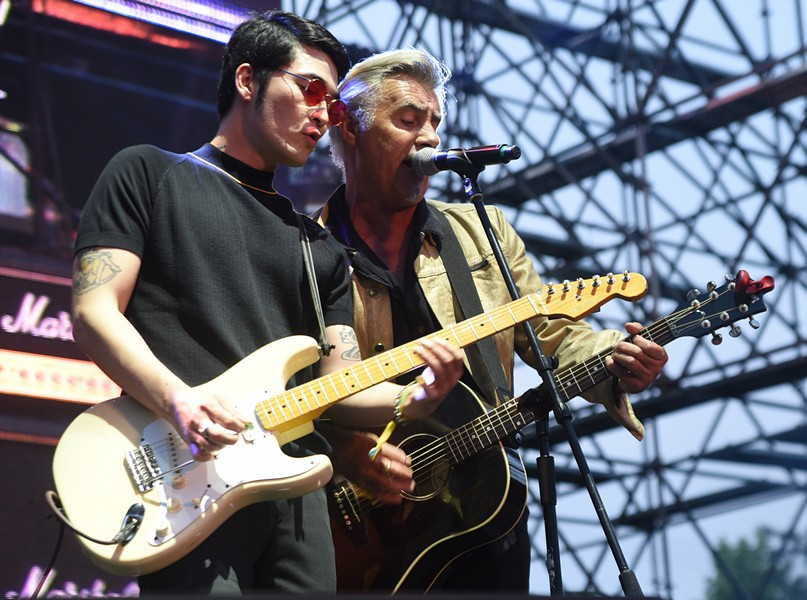
- Cha-Cha formerly of Korean punk band No Brain and Glen Matlock formerly of UK punk band Sex Pistols perform together at DMZ Peace Train Festival 2018 on June 24 in Cheorwon County.
- Genre: Rock, alternative rock, indie rock, world music, punk rock, electronic music, folk music
- Dates: June 13-15, 2025
- Locations: Cheorwon, South Korea
- Years active: 2018 - present
- Website: DMZ Peace Train Music Festival

DMZ Peace Train Music Festival is a music festival held in Cheorwon County, Gangwon Province, South Korea. It is held close to the border with North Korea, and is intended to promote peace and unification at a place symbolizing division of the Korean Peninsula. It was held as relations between the two Koreas warmed up.

Hosted by Seoul City, Cheorwon County, and Gangwon Province, the event was created when Glastonbury Festival and The Great Escape Festival main booker Martin Elbourne visited Korea in 2017 and visited the DMZ with Zandari Festa organizers Dalse Kong Yoon-young and Lee Dong-yeon. Elbourne returned in January 2018 and convinced Seoul Mayor Park Won-soon, Gangwon Governor Choi Moon-soon and Culture Minister Do Jong-hwan to fund the festival. In 2019 the event has additional sponsorship support from the Korea Tourism Organization. The festival is managed domestically, while Elbourne serves on the advisory committee alongside Stephen Budd of Africa Express and Martin Goldschmidt of Cooking Vinyl.

== Location ==
The festival was held in various locations in Seoul and Cheorwon in its first two years. Seminars were held at Seoul's Platform Changdong 61, June 21-22, prior to the main festival days. On June 23-24, Goseokjeong Pavilion in Cheorwon right outside the DMZ served as the main venue for the free festival, with smaller limited-access events held within the DMZ at Woljeong-ri station and the ruins of the Workers' Party of Korea headquarters. Some participants took the DMZ Train to Cheorwon for a special program.

For 2019, DMZ Peace Train Music Festival was held on June 5-9 at Goseokjeong, as well as around the ruins of the former headquarters of the Workers’ Party of Korea as well as near Woljeong-ri station and Soisan mountain. Talks were held at Platform Changdong 61 on June 5 and 6.

North Korea was alerted about the festival so the noise would not be misunderstood.

Contrary to many participants' expectations, they reported the festival was light-hearted and the location peaceful.

== Tickets ==
The first year was free entry, with 12,000 attendees RSVPing their attendance. For the second year, tickets are being sold in order to help the local economy and prevent no-shows. Festivalgoers receive vouchers equivalent to the ticket price which may be redeemed at local businesses.

== Line-ups ==
=== 2018 ===
Sex Pistols founding bassist Glen Matlock made headlines when he agreed to perform the festival, requesting organisers only cover his airfare. Matlock performed solo, as well as with Korean punk bands Crying Nut and No Brain member Cha-Cha.

It was reported the organizers wanted to invite North Korean musicians to perform, although that ended up not happening.

Saturday, June 23	(South Korea) Adoy; (South Korea) Bahngbek; (South Korea) Billy Carter; (South Korea) Bluse Power; (South Korea) Cha Jin Yeob Collective A; (South Korea) Galaxy Express; (South Korea) Hitchhiker; (South Korea) Idiotape; (South Korea) Kang San-eh; (South Korea) Kiha & the Faces; (South Korea) Kirara; (South Korea) Lee Sang-soon; (South Korea) NST & The Soul Sauce; (South Korea) Sunwoo Jung-a; (France) Kid Francescoli; (Japan) Mitsume; (United Kingdom) Newton Faulkner; (Thailand) Phum Viphurit; (Japan) Txako; (France) Vadou Game; (Palestine) Zenobia
Sunday, June 24	(South Korea) Bahngbek; (South Korea) Cha Seung-woo (No Brain); (South Korea) Crying Nut; (South Korea) Jambinai; (South Korea) Lee Seung-hwan; (South Korea) Life and Time; (South Korea) Say Sue Me; (South Korea) Se So Neon; (South Korea) SsingSsing; (Japan) Anoice; (Scotland) Colonel Mustard and the Dijon 5; (United Kingdom) Glen Matlock; (France) Joyce Jonathan; (Taiwan) No Party for Cao Dong

=== 2019 ===
The second festival took place during a stall in US-DPRK negotiations.

The number of foreign acts increased from 12 to 17. Seoul Community Radio hosted a new dance stage at the event.

Former Velvet Underground member John Cale was announced as one of the foreign headliners, along with Korean-Chinese rock legend Cui Jian and Seun Kuti, son of Nigerian musician Fela Kuti, and Danish punk band Iceage. Additionally two former North Koreans performed: pianist Kim Cheol-woong and Korean-Japanese producer DJ Little Big Bee, who was banned from visiting South Korea until recently.

The following performed in the main festival site at Goseokjeong.

Friday, June 7	(South Korea) MKIT RAIN; (South Korea) Kingston Rudieska; (Nigeria) Seun Kuti & Egypt 80; (South Africa) Rhea Blek; (Cuba) Guampara Music; (Spain) Xavi Sarria
Saturday, June 8	(South Korea) Kim Sa-wol X Kim Hae-won; (South Korea) Numnum; (South Korea) Dead Buttons; (South Korea) Sonyen; (South Korea) Sultan of the Disco; (South Korea) Jannabi; (South Korea) Hellivision X Kim Oki; (South Korea) Hyukoh; (China) Cui Jian; (United Kingdom) Fujiya & Miyagi; (Japan) Little Big Bee; (Japan) Lucie, Too; (Hungary) Mongooz and the Magnet; (Thailand) Palmy
Sunday, June 9	(South Korea) Gureung Train; (South Korea) Stella Jang; (South Korea) Amado Lee Jaram Band; (South Korea) Jung Tae-chun Park Eun-ok; (South Korea) George; (South Korea) Colde; (South Korea) So!YoON!; (Taiwan) Elephant Gym; (Denmark) Iceage; (United Kingdom) John Cale; (France) Last Train; (United Kingdom) Peace

There were also special performances held at more sensitive locations within the DMZ, including a 10-person band featuring indie musicians and dancers inspired by military music.

Friday, June 7	1600	Soisan Mountain	(South Korea) Yoon Jae-won
Friday, June 7	1900	Workers' Party HQ	(South Korea) Kim Sa-wol X Kim Hae-won; (South Korea) Kim Ji-won (of Billy Carter); (South Korea) Bek Hyunjin; (South Korea) Ambiguous Dance Company
Saturday, June 8	1300	Woljeong-ri station	(South Korea) Kim Cheol-woong; (South Korea) Wussami; (South Korea) Jeongmilla

=== 2022 ===
The 2020 and 2021 festivals were cancelled due to the COVID-19 pandemic. The festival was changed to a fee, and all-day tickets were sold for 66,000 won

The following performed in the main festival site at Goseokjeong.

Saturday, October 1	(South Korea) Balming Tiger; (South Korea) Bongjeingan; (South Korea) Soumbalgwang; (South Korea) CHS; (South Korea) Yoon Soo Il Band; (South Korea) Lang Lee; (South Korea) Car, the Garden; (South Korea) Haepaary; (South Korea) Hyodo and Bass; (France) Bandit Bandit; (Palestine) Makimakkuk; (United States) Starcrawler
Sunday, October 2	(South Korea) OKFM; (South Korea) Kim Il Du and Bulsechul; (South Korea) Nerd Connection; (South Korea) Nucksal X Cadejo; (South Korea) No Brain; (South Korea) Bulgogidisco; (South Korea) Leenalchi X Ambiguous Dance Company; (South Korea) Han Young Ae; (Hungary) Bohemian betyars; (Thailand) HYBS; (France) The Inspector Cluzo

As in 2019, there was also a concert at Woljeong-ri station, and two artists participated. It received only 150 attendees.

Saturday, October 1	150	Woljeong-ri Station	(South Korea) Lang Lee; (South Korea) Jaehoon Kim

=== 2023 ===
In 2023, they moved the festival week to September, and announced the first line-up involving HMLTD and Mild High Club. Also Neu!'s Michael Rother was included in the lineup later. From that year, the festival run a new camping site called Peace Camp.

The following performed in the main festival site at Goseokjeong.

Saturday, September 2	(South Korea) 250; (South Korea) Gate Flowers; (South Korea) Verycoybunny; (South Korea) Silica Gel; (South Korea) CIFIKA; (South Korea) Wah Wah Wah; (South Korea) Idiotape; (South Korea) Lee Sang Eun; (South Korea) Hypnosis Therapy; (Wales) Chroma; (Japan) DYGL; (Germany) Michael Rother; (Hong Kong) 南洋派對N.Y.P.D.; (Syria) TootArd
Sunday, September 3	(South Korea) Meaningful Stone; (South Korea) My Aunt Mary; (South Korea) Sogumm; (South Korea) Soombee; (South Korea) Adoy; (South Korea) Choi Beck Ho; (South Korea) Jambinai; (Colombia) Frente Cumbiero; (United Kingdom) HMLTD; (Thailand) Kiki; (United States) Mild High Club; (France) Onra

=== 2024 ===
In 2024, they moved the festival week to June, and announced the line-up involving Porridge Radio, Silica Gel , Kim Soo-chul and The Orb.

The following performed in the main festival site at Goseokjeong.

Saturday, June 15	(South Korea) 9 And the Numbers; (South Korea) Glen Check; (South Korea) Dabda; (South Korea) Seaweed Mustache; (South Korea) Balming Tiger; (South Korea) Uhuhboo Project; (South Korea) Omar and the Eastern Power; (South Korea) Yoon Jiyoung; (South Korea) E Sens; (South Korea) Kirara; (France) Meule; (United Kingdom) The Orb; (United Kingdom) Yellow Days
Sunday, June 16	(South Korea) Kim Soo-chul; (South Korea) Cadejo; (South Korea) Snake Chicken Soup; (South Korea) Silica Gel; (South Korea) Tabber; (South Korea) Hanroro; (Taiwan) 9m88; (Japan) Gliiico; (Japan) Johnnivan; (Japan) No Buses; (United Kingdom) Porridge Radio

As in 2024, there was also a morning stage at Sudogukteo, and two shows participated.

Sunday, June 16	Sudogukteo Morning Stage	(South Korea) Minhwi Lee, Kim Haram; (South Korea) CIFIKA, Kim Doeon and Nancy Boy

=== 2025 ===
In 2025, the festival announced the line-up involving Japanese Breakfast, Lambrini Girls, HiTech and Télépopmusik. They extended the festival schedule to three days. Kula Shaker joined the festival's lineup, but it was cancelled due to the artist's reasons.

The following performed in the main festival site at Goseokjeong.

Friday, June 13	(South Korea) CHS; (South Korea) Cadejo; (South Korea) Liquid Sound; (South Korea) Idiotape; (South Korea) Kirara
Saturday, June 14	(South Korea) Goonam; (South Korea) Kim Minkyu; (South Korea) Kim Hyeoncheol; (South Korea) Danpyunsun & The Moments Ensemble; (South Korea) Babo; (South Korea) Samui; (South Korea) Sumin; (South Korea) Green Flame Boys; (United States) HiTech; (France) ko Shin Moon; (Japan) Minami Deutsch; (France) Télépopmusik; (Taiwan) The Chairs
Sunday, June 15	(South Korea) Meaningful Stone; (South Korea) Noridogam; (South Korea) Love & Peace; (South Korea) Wah Wah Wah; (South Korea) Jooyoung; (South Korea) Jisokuryclub; (South Korea) Creespy; (Indonesia) Ali; (United States) Japanese Breakfast; (United Kingdom) Lambrini Girls; (Japan) Tendouji

As in 2025, there was also a special morning stage, and two artists participated.

Sunday, June 14	Special Morning Stage	(South Korea) Min Cloudia; (South Korea) Kim Oki

=== 2026 ===
In 2026, the festival announced the line-up involving Thurston Moore Group, Nourished by Time, Lewis OfMan and Mildlife. They extended the festival schedule to three days. The festival added a midnight rave stage.

The following performed in the main festival site at Goseokjeong.

Friday, June 12	(South Korea) Kim Jaehoon; (South Korea) Animal Divers; (South Korea) National Pigeon Unity; (South Korea) Wah Wah Wah
Saturday, June 13	(South Korea) Galaxy Express; (South Korea) The Volunteers; (South Korea) Sailor Honeymoon; (South Korea) Effie; (South Korea) Otis Lim; (South Korea) Yi Sung Yol; (South Korea) Cha Cha and the Cousins; (South Korea) Funkafric; (Indonesia) Batavia Collective; (United Kingdom) Deadletter; (Japan) FCO.; (United States) Nourished by Time; (United States) Thurston Moore Group
Sunday, June 14	(South Korea) Bek Hyunjin; (South Korea) Shin In Ryu; (South Korea) Insooni; (South Korea) Electron Sheep; (South Korea) Peppertones; (South Korea) Peach Truck Hijackers; (Thailand) GYMV; (France) La Flemme; (France) Lewis OfMan; (Australia) Mildlife; (Japan) Tricot

As in 2026, there was also a special morning stage, and two artists participated.

Sunday, June 15	Special Morning Stage	(South Korea) Moher; (South Korea) Haepa

== See also ==
- List of music festivals in South Korea
- List of music festivals
