= Colonel Mustard and the Dijon 5 =

Scottish band

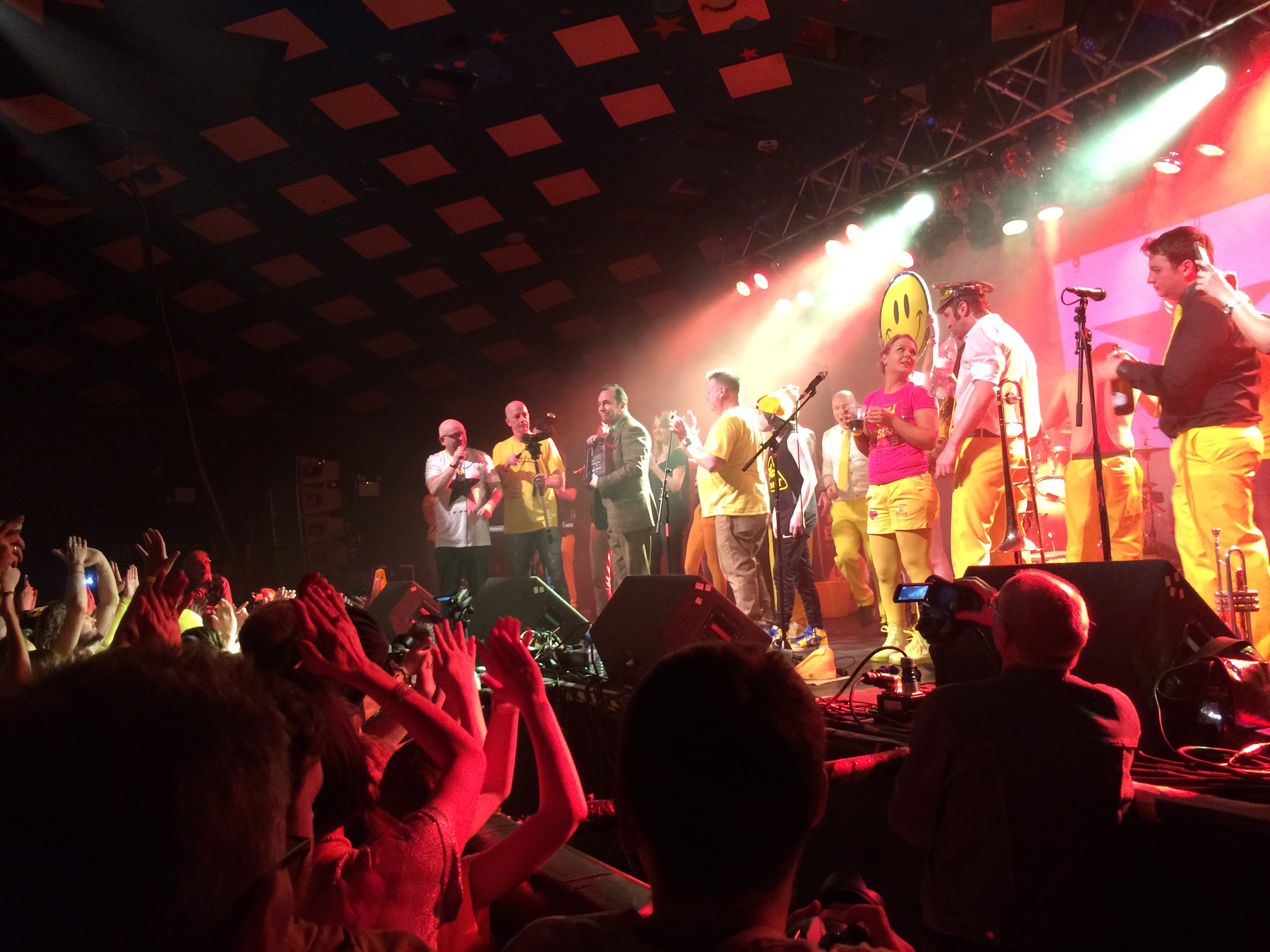
- Colonel Mustard & the Dijon 5's set at Glasgow Barrowlands on 5 March 2016.

Background information
- Origin: Glasgow, Scotland
- Genres: Alternative; comedy; dance; rock
- Members: John McAlinden; Gary Mortimer; Chris Grant; Craig Ross; Mark Laing; Kirstin McNair; Greg Halbert; Nicola Thorne; Mikey Grant; Fathom Ross; Gary Penders
- Website: http://www.colonelmustarddijon5.com/

Colonel Mustard & the Dijon 5 are a Scottish alternative/comedy/dance/rock group based in Glasgow.

The band consists of Colonel John Thomas McMustard and 9 other members. The Band motto is "expect the unexpected"

The band is associated with "The Yellow Movement," described as “a creative movement to affect positive change and spread happiness and joy, all while wearing yellow, the colour of sunshine.” The band headlined the March into Pitlochry Festival in 2016, and along with seven other bands took the 'Yellow Movement' to the Zandari Festa festival in Seoul, South Korea in October 2017 and the DMZ Peace Train Music Festival below the border of North Korea in late June 2018.

According to former band member David Blair, the origin of the band's name came from "a shaman from Dijon [who] presented the band name to the Colonel at the Glastonbury Stone Circle in 1997 when he was just John McAlinden"

The band's diverse musical influences are brought together to produce their unique sound:

“We love so many different genres as a band so it is about pulling from different areas and trying to create our own melting pot. We try to make people who come along to see us feel part of the band – we want to make music that will get the crowd involved in whatever song it may be.”

== Discography ==
- Party To Make Music To Party To Make Music To Party To 1 (debut album).
- Peace Love & Mustard (Electric Honey Records).
- The DiffiCULT Number 2

== Members ==
The band has 11 current members including:

- John McAlinden aka Colonel John Tomas Mustard (Singer)
- Gary Mortimer aka Archduke Mortimer Winthorpe 3rd Marquis of Denmark (Bass)
- Chris Grant aka Queef L@tina aka The Rant (guitar)
- Craig Ross aka Hamoaglaphonic (drums)
- Mark Laing aka DJ5 (beats, acoustic guitar)
- Kirstin McNair aka Badges McBuffters (trumpet)
- Greg Halbert aka Vanilla Johnson (trombone)
- Nicola Thorne aka Bobby Snoobins (sax)
- Mikey Grant (keys)
- Fathom Ross aka Full Fathom Five (backing vocals)

Other members include:

- Roddy Dickson aka Bongo Gorilla (mad bongos 'n' that)

Former members include:

- Becky Robb (backing vocals),
- Nicolette Gibbs (backing vocals)
- Chinley Biggins (bass),
- Moonchuck McMungus (sax),
- La Guapa (trumpet)
- David Blair aka The Dijancer
- Colin Syme aka The Inflatable Ginger Party Vortex aka Disco Colin (keys)

== Awards and honours ==
- Best Live Act at the Scottish Alternative Music Awards 2015
- Best UK at the Pure M Awards 2015
- Filling the Glasgow Barrowland Ballroom in 2016
