= ...Whatever That Means =

South Korean melodic punk band

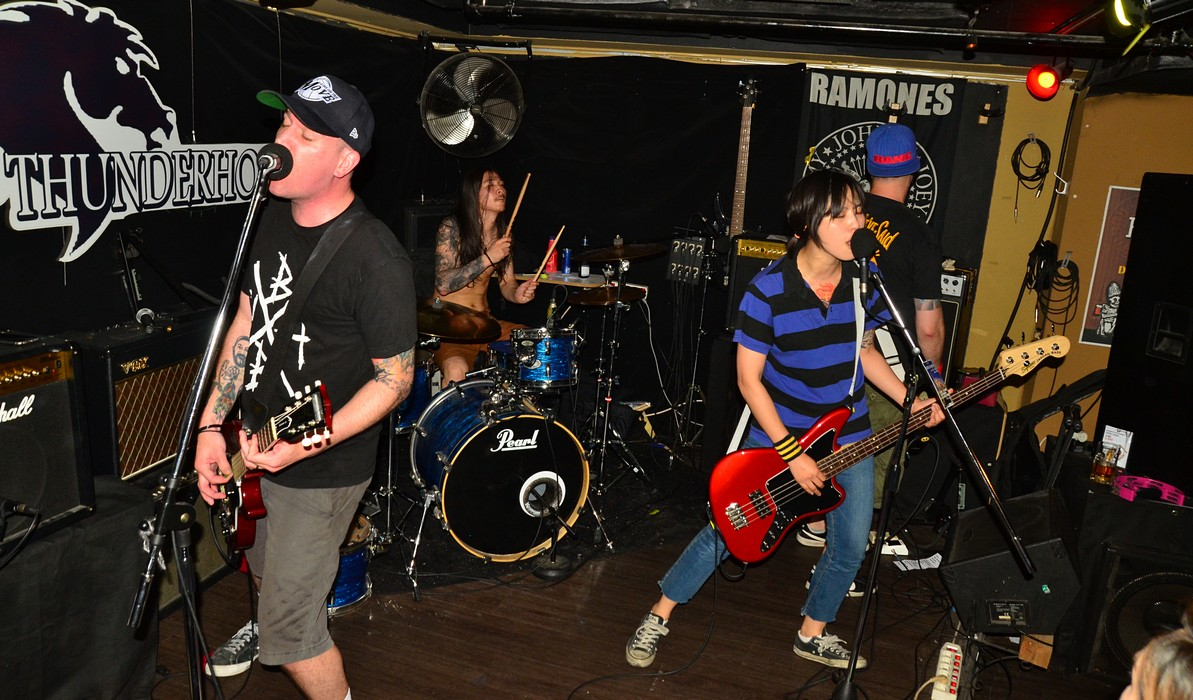
- Seoul punk band ...Whatever That Means perform in Thunderhorse Tavern on 28 May 2016.

Background information
- Origin: Seoul, South Korea
- Genres: Punk rock
- Years active: 2009–present
- Labels: World Domination, Inc.
- Members: Jeff Moses; Trash Yang Moses; Bialy; Woojoon

...Whatever That Means is a South Korean melodic punk band based in Seoul, South Korea. Alternative Press called them the "pop-punk face of the Korean music scene." The two key members are married couple Jeff and Trash. Both are promoters who have organized concerts and brought foreign bands to Korea. They organize annual Halloween shows and previously managed the monthly 2nd Saturdays concert series. They have been associated closely with the venues Club Spot, Ruailrock, Club SHARP, and Thunderhorse Tavern.

They run Thunderhorse Studios with Thunderhorse Tavern ex-owner Kirk Kwon. They featured prominently in the 2014 documentary Us and Them: Korean Indie Rock in a K-Pop World. They also appear in Ken Robinson's documentary film Ash. Their influences include Gob, Face to Face, Descendents/ALL, Bad Religion, Social Distortion, and The Ataris.

== Origins ==
Jeff and Trash got married in Seoul on February 28, 2009. After, they had a concert at Club Spot. Jeff had wanted to perform, but didn't have a band or a name yet, so the poster was designed by artist and original guitarist Ric Comly, to say "Jeff ...whatever that means." Trash later joined the band as bassist and they continued performing as ...Whatever That Means.

== The Purge Movement ==
In 2010, ...Whatever That Means formed a coalition with other notable Korean punk bands Rux and the Swindlers to create the Purge Movement, aimed at fighting gentrification in the Hongdae area. Referencing purging of gentrifying factors in the area including repetitive, uncreative street performers, they organized concerts in Hongdae Playground. They also intended to raise awareness of non-mainstream music and support live music venues rather than compete with them by getting more people interested.

== World Domination, Inc. ==
The band toured the US in 2011 and 2016, using their label World Domination, Inc. to promote culture of Korea and its punk scene abroad. The 2011 tour was a precursor to a hiatus, while Jeff earned a master's degree in Pennsylvania.

For both tours, they released compilations titled "Them and Us." The first compilation was recorded on the stage at Club Spot, and the second was made in Thunderhorse Studios. Both compilations contain around 10 bands performing an original song and a cover from a bigger band, a strategy to encourage US listeners to give unknown bands a try. They were given out for free on tour Moses also helped fellow Korean bands Full Garage and Skasucks tour the west coast US.

From the tour, they made contact with US punk band Burn Burn Burn, recording a split album together. Burn Burn Burn came to Korea for a tour managed by World Domination, Inc.

...Whatever That Means toured Malaysia and Singapore in early 2015, where they made connections with the local music scenes, facilitating exchanges and bringing bands to Korea, starting with Iman's League.

On August 1, 2019, the label released "World Domination Vol.1, a four-song compilation of bands from four countries. The four bands are skatepunk band Sidecar from Busan, emotive punk band Social Circuit from Malaysia, power punk band Mable's Marbles from the U.S. and dirty rock 'n' roll band DFMK from Mexico. Hints were given that the second volume in the series would feature ska.

== IT'S A FEST! ==
In celebration of the 10th anniversary of the label and band, as well as the marriage of Jeff and Trash, WDI announced a free two-day underground music festival to be held June 15 and 16, 2019, at Hanagae Beach on Muuido, and introduced a crowdfunding campaign on Tumblbug to support the festival.

The lineup included Galaxy Express, Drinking Boys and Girls Choir, 57, Green Flame Boys, Talkbats, Burning Hepburn, A'Z Bus, Gumiho, Winning Shot, Drive Shower, Smoking Goose, Shin Hantae & Reggae Soul, Romantiqua, Sidecar, Lazybone, and WTM. Foreign acts include Singapore's Iman's League, China's The Sino Hearts, and Malaysia's Half-Asleep.

The second year of the festival was scheduled for June 20 and 21, 2020 but needed to be cancelled due to the COVID-19 global pandemic. The cancelled lineup included foreign bands Green Eyed Monster and Akabane Vulgars on Strong Bypass, both from Japan, and Social Circuit from Malaysia. Local bands included Crying Nut, Galaxy Express, No.1 Korean, National Pigeon Unity, Burning Hepburn, ...Whatever That Means, Chain Reaction, Daddy O Radio, Shin Hantae & Reggae Soul, Ultralazy, Winningshot, Gumiho, Jonny'spark, BEACON, and 444.

Post-Pandemic, IT'S A FEST! returned to Muuido in June 2023. Like 2019, the main festival ran all day on Saturday and Sunday. The lineup included 19 punk, ska, and hardcore bands from Korea, Japan, Singapore, and France. The festival also expanded to include an acoustic night on the beach on Friday night to work as a soft opening for the fest. IT'S A FEST! will be returning as a yearly festival at Hanagae Beach on Muuido.

== Recording Studios ==
Jeff and Trash were involved in Thunderhorse Studios, co-owned with Kirk Kwon who owned the former venue Thunderhorse Tavern. On August 19, 2019, Thunderhorse Studios announced its closing at the end of September. Since then, Jeff has opened his own recording studio named Binary Studios. Binary Studios originally began as a home studio, but in 2022 Jeff opened Binary Studios in its new location in the Mangwon neighborhood in Seoul. Binary Studios has worked with many bands from the Korean scene such as Green Flame Boys, Beacon, WinningShot, Monkey Gang War, Sweet Gasoline, and more. The studio has also engineered and produced albums for Iman's League from Singapore.

== SHARP Ink and Rebellion Ink ==
Trash was a tattooist at SHARP Ink in Mangwon-dong, run by Ryu Jinsuk of Skasucks. She tattooed "Jeff sucks" on a member of Burn Burn Burn after receiving a donation from punk zine Broke in Korea. In November 2019 she opened her own tattoo shop, Rebellion Ink.

== Members ==
- Jeff Moses – guitar, vocals
- Trash Yang Moses – bass, vocals
- Bialy – guitar, vocals
- HwangYong - drums

== Past members ==
- Ric Comly – pretend lead guitarist
- Alex Kyllo - lead guitar
- Hong9 – drums
- Mizno – drums
- 5baeng – lead guitar
- Woojoon - drums
- Gwangya – drums

== Discography ==
- The Newest Hope (2010)
- Sounds from the Explosion (2011)
- Them and Us: Korea's Punks at Club Spot (2011)
- Honggu Goes To Prison – cover song EP (2013)
- Sixty-Eight, Twenty-Two (2014)
- Asian Prodigy single – Chinkees cover (2014)
- Them and Us 2: Korea's Punks at Thunderhorse Studios (2016)
- Blowing Minds & Melting Faces – split with Burn Burn Burn (2016)
- Revolving Doors (2020)
- Them and Us 3: Korea's Punks at Binary Studios (2022)
- Singles 2009–2023 (2023)
- Split EP with The Skippers (Japan) (2023)
