= Ureuk and the Gypsies =

South Korean avant-garde music band

- Ureuk and the Gypsies performing at Block Party Music and Art Festival 2026

Background information
- Origin: South Korea
- Genres: avant-garde music; gugak; experimental rock
- Years active: 2023-present
- Label: Mirrorball
- Members: Jo Seokhyeong; Son Heejoon; Lee Joonha (Fin Fior); Lee Seungmoon; Oh Joonyoung; Le Sannah; Kim Jihu; Kim Jihong
- Past members: Kang Youngjo (Yordan); Park Hyeonmin; Yang Kyuseok

Ureuk and the Gypsies (Korean: 우륵과 풍각쟁이들) is a South Korean avant-garde music band. The band consists of Jo Seokhyeong, Son Heejoon, Lee Joonha, Lee Seungmoon, Oh Joonyoung, Le Sannah, Kim Jihu and Kim Jihong. Since their formation in 2023, the band has released two studio albums Ureuk and the Gypsies (2023) and Spirits Unbound (풍류) (2025).

== History ==
Ureuk and the Gypsies was formed in 2023. They released a self-titled studio album in January 2023 only through bandcamp. Music critic Seong Hyein described the track 보신각 시나위 (해맞이 타령 Ⅱ) as "Compared to other teams that started in jazz, the attitude of using gugak is radically different, and the unique energy feels interesting."

They performed with the Chinese band Gong Gong Gong, and later released their second studio album, Spirits Unbound, in 2025. They perform at the Zandari Festa in 2025 and in 2026, they support Shame, and perform at the Pentaport Rock Festival.

== Discography ==
=== Studio albums ===
- Ureuk and the Gypsies (2023)
- Spirits Unbound (풍류) (2025)
