= Socialclub Hyangwu =

South Korean post-punk music band

- Origin: South Korea
- Genres: post-punk; gothic rock; riot grrrl
- Years active: 2023-present
- Labels: Mirrorball; Blue Tangerine
- Members: Jeon Dain; Jeong Youngho; Kim Gawon; Bae Hyeonmin
- Past members: Yang Jeongoh

Socialclub Hyangwu (Korean: 향우회) is a South Korean post-punk band. The band consists of Jeon Dain, Jeong Youngho, Kim Gawon and Bae Hyeonmin. Since their formation in 2023, the band has released an EP album The Panic Tool (2025).

== History ==
Socialclub Hyangwu was formed in 2023. They released their first EP, The Panic Tool, in 2025. The EP featured Jeong Kihoon of Moskva Surfing Club as the engineer, and Kang Dongsoo of Soumbalgwang as the producer.

== Discography ==
=== EPs ===
- The Panic Tool (2025)
