= Rux =

South Korean street punk band

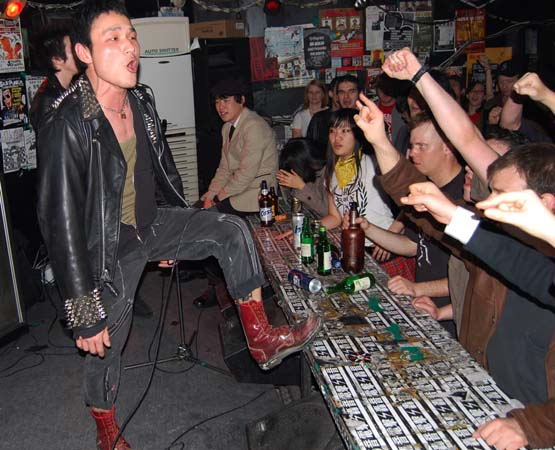
- Jonghee of Rux performs in Skunk Hell on March 31, 2007.

Background information
- Origin: Seoul, South Korea
- Genres: Punk rock
- Years active: 1996 - 2011; 2020
- Labels: Dope Records; Skunk Label
- Members: Won Jong-hee; Jung Yeawon; Lee Eun-gyo; Bae Ji-sung

Rux is an influential street punk band from South Korea. They formed in 1996 and released their first recording in 1999. Lead vocalist Won Jong-hee, the only remaining original member, also ran Skunk Label and owned the punk music venue Skunk Hell. They gained notoriety in 2005 when friends of the band undressed on stage during the live nationwide broadcast of an episode of MBC concert show Music Camp.

== History ==
Rux was formed in 1996 when the punk music scene centered on Club Drug and Crying Nut. The name "Rux" is synonymous with "Ruckus".

Rux released several songs on compilations and went through numerous personnel changes before releasing the seven-song compilation I Gatta Go. The title refers to conscription in South Korea for all Korean males, which frequently breaks up Korean bands. Following the release, the band went on hiatus from 1999 to 2002 while Won Jong-hee served in the military.

=== Skunk Label ===
Won Jong-hee owned and operated Skunk Label, a DIY record label for Korean punk bands founded in July 1998. Skunk Label went on hiatus while Won served his military duty. After Won returned in 2002, Skunk Label released We are the Punx in Korea, a 30-track compilation CD that has been described as the "Rosetta stone" of Korean punk rock.

=== Skunk Hell ===
Under the banner of Skunk Label, Won operated two live music venues, called Skunk Hell.

The first venue, located between Hongik University and Sinchon, was an obscure basement venue described as the size of a "good-sized living room".

The second Skunk Hell opened in Hongdae area in January 2004 in the former location of Club Drug. Eventually weekly management of the live music schedule was handed over to Ryu Cheol-hwan of punk band Suck Stuff. At the end of 2008, Skunk Hell officially closed its doors, with Ryu and Won citing waning finances and the inability to secure a liquor licence, as well as market saturation of competing live music venues. Skunk Hell closed its doors and Skunk Label fell out of use, as both Rux and Suck Stuff were quickly signed to Dope Records.

Skunk Hell opened in its third location in Mullae-dong in 2015.

== Band members ==
- Won Jong-hee (원종희): Vocals
- Lee Eungyo (이은교): drums
- Yonghee (용희): bass
- Zacomo: guitar
- Jinu Konda: guitar

=== Former members ===
- Ryu Myung-hoon (류명훈): Drums
- Lee Hyun-hee (이현희): Guitars
- Yoon Hyung-sick (윤형식): Bass
- Lee Hyung-wi (Guitar)
- Lee Seung-bok (Bass)
- Kang Dol-il (Drums)
- Park Jun-young (Guitar)
- Kim Seuk-yun (Drums)
- Lee Ju-hyun (Bass)
- Park Gun-woo (Guitar)
- Paul Bricky (Bass)
- Joey Queen (Guitar)
- Lee Dong-hoon (Drums)
- Lee Tae-sun (Bass)
- Jung Yeawon (정예원): guitar
- Bae Jisung (배지성): bass

== Discography ==
=== Albums ===
- [2004.07.01] Where are We Going? (우린 어디로 가는가)
- [2007.08.17] Rux the Ruckus Army
- [2009.06.25] Eternal Children (영원한 아이들)

=== Live albums ===
- (2005) The Skunx 2005 Live

=== Mini-Albums ===
- [1999.05.01] I Gatta Go
- [2005.06.29] Another Conception

=== Singles ===
- [2011.09.02] Dirty Punk (더러운 양아치)

=== Digital Singles ===
- [2008.03.24] Last 10 Seconds
- [2009.04.07] Wreck (만신창이)
- [2010.06.15] Out of the Blue

=== Compilations ===
- [1998.??.??] 98 Punk Daejanchi ~ Our Minds are All the Same (#1 Budutga, #2 Don't Wake Up, #3 Lock, #4 Another Face)
- [1999.??.??] 3000 Punk (#7 45, #25 Sub)
- [1999.03.22] Club Hardcore, Assa Obang (#6 Headless Fish, #14 Street)
- [2003.07.05] We Are the Punx in Korea (#7 Our Minds are All the Same)
- [2006.04.20] 2006 Skunk Compilation "Strike! Strike! Strike!!" (#6 And Again, #12 When I Die, #17 Oworui Norae 2)
- [2008.09.16] No Future for You (#5 Everybody's Wicked)
- [2010.08.02] Burning Hepburn - Life Goes on (Burning Hepburn) (#3 Life Goes on) (feat. Rux, Crying Nut)
