= Album 1 =

Studio album by Slant
- Released: 26 February 2021
- Genre: Hardcore punk
- Length: 16:55
- Label: Iron Lung Records
- Producer: Tits Belair

Slant chronology
Vain Attempt (2019)	Album 1 (2021)	Demo 2023 (2023)

Album 1 (Korean: 1집; RR: Iljib) is the debut studio album by South Korean hardcore punk band Slant. The album was released on 26 February 2021 through Iron Lung Records. The album was nominated for Best Metal & Hardcore Album at the 2022 Korean Music Awards.

== Critical reception ==
Andrew Sacher of BrooklynVegan stated "Album 1 is an album that’s just impossible to stand still to, with a drummer that sounds like he’s propelling every other member of the band to play faster." Dan Southgate of DIY Conspiracy said Yeji's vocals on the album as "The way it breaks up slightly, humanising the inhuman noises emanating from her". Lim Heeyoon, a member of the Korean Music Awards, described the album as "The texture is punk, but structurally, the text is meticulous and attractive enough to be attached to any rock or metal machine (genre) with "heavy" or "extreme" in front of it."

== Track listing ==
No.	Title	Length
1.	"Enemy"	1:40
2.	"Terminal"	1:42
3.	"How Did It Feel?"	1:42
4.	"Stagnation"	1:35
5.	"Travesty"	1:48
6.	"Prison"	1:44
7.	"Effigy"	1:16
8.	"Violent Minds"	1:30
9.	"Modern Addictions"	1:31
10.	"Casualty"	2:27
