= Peach Truck Hijackers =

South Korean rock band

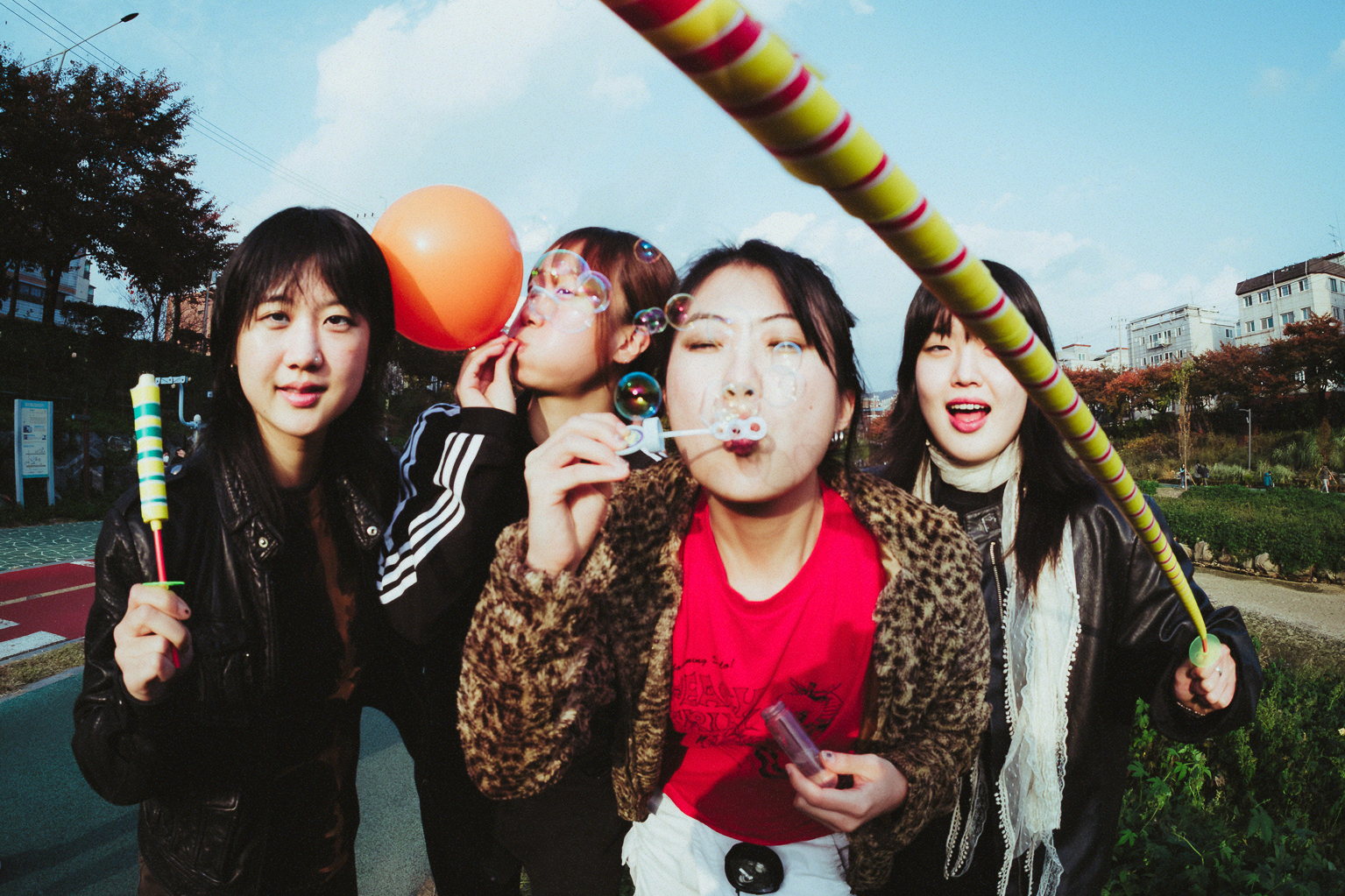
- From left to right: Lee Sejeong, Kim Gyuri, Lee Chung-Kyoung, Lee Jeonghyo

Background information
- Origin: Seoul, South Korea
- Genres: Rock; indie rock; post-punk
- Works: Peach Truck Hijackers (self-titled album, 2025)
- Years active: 2024- present
- Label: Poclanos
- Members: Lee Sejeong; Kim Gyuri; Lee Chung-Kyoung; Lee Jeonghyo
- Website: Peach Truck Hijackers

Peach Truck Hijackers (Korean: 피치트럭하이재커스) is a South Korean indie rock band based in Seoul. The band currently consists of Lee Chung-Kyoung (vocals, guitar), Lee Jeonghyo (guitar), Kim Gyuri (bass), and Lee Sejeong (drums).

Since their formation in 2024, They have released one studio album Peach Truck Hijackers (November 18, 2025).

== Career ==
Peach Truck Hijackers was formed by the four members all attending university as design students. Since their formation they worked with a number of bands as designers and created zines for their own album release.

Their debut self titled album was recorded and mixed with the help of fellow Korean indie musician Kim Byung-Kyu of Say Sue Me at the Busan band's recording studio Beachtown Music. Both Kim and Kang Dong-Soo of Soumbalgwang produced the album.

Before album release they performed many concerts across Korea and played festivals like Block Party, Not a Fest, and Debaser Festival in Busan. They were nominated at the 23rd annual Korean Music Awards in 2026 for Rookie of the Year and best rock album.

== Discography ==
=== Studio albums ===
| Title | Album details |
|---|---|
| Peach Truck Hijackers | Released: November 18, 2025; Distributer: Poclanos |

== Awards and nominations ==
| Year | Award | Category | Result | Ref. |
|---|---|---|---|---|
| 2026 | Korean Music Awards | Rookie of the Year | Nominated | |
| 2026 | Korean Music Awards | Best Rock Album | Nominated | |
