= Kim Cheol-woong =

North Korean defector and pianist (born 1974)

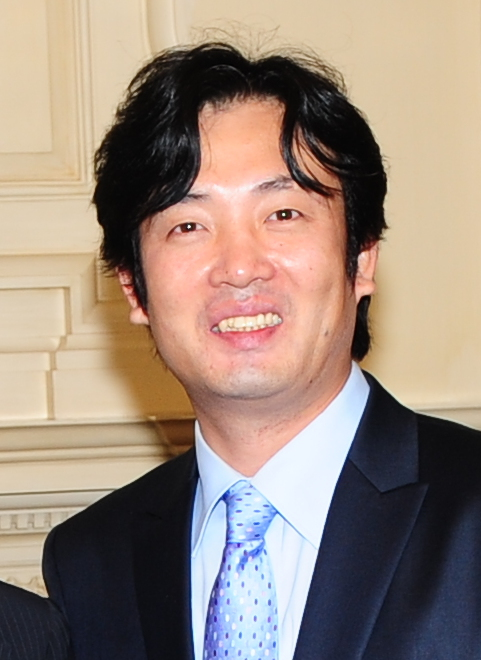
- Kim in 2008
- Born: 1974 (age 51–52); North Korea
- Education: Pyongyang University of Music and Dance; Moscow Conservatory
- Occupation: Pianist
- Known for: 2001 defection to South Korea

Korean name
- Hangul: 김철웅
- Hanja: 金哲雄
- RR: Gim Cheolung
- MR: Kim Ch'ŏrung

Kim Cheol-woong (Korean: 김철웅, born 1974) is a North Korean pianist who defected to South Korea.

== Early life ==
Kim Cheol-woong grew up in a prominent North Korean family. His father was the head of their provincial party, which is like a provincial governor, and his mother was a university leader. His grandmother founded the first and largest department store in Pyongyang and was the president of the department store until 1992. Kim started practicing piano when he was five years old. Kim's musical skills were spotted at an early age.

In 1981, at age eight, he was admitted into the Pyongyang University of Music and Dance. Over the next fourteen years, he suffered through rigorous training to perform tunes glorifying Kim Jong Il. After his graduation, he was sent to Tchaikovsky Conservatory in Moscow from 1995 to 1999 to study. Moscow was fascinating to the twenty-one year old who had not been exposed to music outside North Korea. He felt like he had discovered a new world.

Upon his return home, he was named lead pianist in the State Symphony Orchestra. He also took a liking to Jang Song-thaek's niece, who had attended school with him since he was eight. Kim had only thought of her as a friend, until he returned home from Russia. Planning on proposing to her, Kim practiced "'A Comme Amour'," a romantic number by pianist Richard Clayderman. A song commonly played in elevators, restaurants, and hotel lounges around the world and especially popular in east Asian countries.

== Defection ==
In October 2001, as he was practicing the song, someone reported him to the State Security Department. Because of his parents status, all he had to do was to write a ten-page self-criticism paper, but it still took a heavy toll on him. Unlike the North Koreans who left due to famine, Kim, who had enjoyed a life of privilege, fled because of his unhappiness about restriction on his life as an artist.

He took a leave from the symphony saying he had a relative pass away and he told his parents he was going to another city to perform. His mother had hid some American money, about 2000 dollars, which he took when he left.

Kim was told if he crossed the Tumen River, he could get to the free world through China. He headed toward the river and had no trouble at ID inspection points because he was a Pyongyang citizenship card holder. Arriving at the river in the middle of the night, he was found by the undercover army. He remembered the 2000 dollars and gave it to them. In turn, they helped him cross the river and directed him to a small village. There, he informed the people he could play piano, but they did not care, they needed someone to work. So he worked, cutting and harvesting rice and woodcutting at a lumber mill.

In the spring of 2002, a fellow defector informed him of a church run by a Korean-Chinese pastor. The church had a piano. He joined the underground bible study group in an effort to play the piano. The church also provided food and shelter for the refugees. He couldn't help crying when he saw the piano. The pianist wouldn't let him touch it at first, not believing he knew something about the instrument. Others petitioned on his behalf and he was allowed to play.

While living in China, he learned South Korea would provide refuge for North Korean defectors. He had the missionaries from the church he attended make him a fake passport. However, he was caught by immigration authorities trying to get out at the Beijing airport, spent 3 months in Chinese prison, and put on a train to be sent back to North Korea. He miraculously escaped through the window after the police unbound him to let him use the restroom.

Two months later, he was detained in China as he tried to cross into Mongolia. After spending another six months in prison, he was sent to a North Korean prison camp. The investigator who was in charge of him, knew who he was. The investigator said he knew his father. The investigator had attained his position only a month earlier because of Kim's father. Thanks to the investigator, he was categorized as an ordinary person, not as Kim Cheol-woong. He was released three days later.

Right after he was released, he went to the Tumen River. Kim bought another forged passport and this time the Chinese officials bought it. He arrived in South Korea in December 2002.

== Life after defection ==
In 2004, Kim began teaching at Hansei University. He later became known internationally as a concert pianist, and started his own orchestra in South Korea.

On 17 April 2009, Kim performed in a benefit concert at Carnegie Hall's Zankel Hall in New York City fulfilling a dream he has had since defecting.
