= Haepaary =

South Korean electronic band

- Origin: South Korea
- Genres: Electronic music; gugak
- Years active: 2020-present
- Members: Choi Hyewon; Park Minhee
- Website: haepaary.com

Haepaary (Korean: 해파리, stylized as HAEPAARY) is a South Korean electronic music duo. The group consists of Choi Hyewon and Park Minhee. They released their 2021 EP Born by Gorgeousness and won the Best Dance & Electronic Album and single at the 2022 Korean Music Awards.

== Career ==
Haepaary was formed in 2020. Park Minhee is completed Intangible Cultural Heritage, and Choi Hyewon is an artist based on traditional percussion instruments. They interviewed that they were first inspired by traditional Korean music such as Jongmyo Jeryeak and Namchang songs in determining their musical style. Their EP Born by Gorgeousness was released on 28 May 2021, and they had an online concert in South by Southwest.

They won the Best Dance & Electronic Album and single at the 2022 Korean Music Awards. They performed at various Korean music festivals, such as the ACC World Music Festival and the DMZ Peace Train Music Festival.

== Discography ==
=== EPs ===
- Born by Gorgeousness (2021)

=== Digital Singles ===
- A Shining Warrior - A Heartfelt Joy (2021)
- A Sendoff for Ancestor Spirits (2021)
- Go to Gpd and Then (2021)
- Nothing to Envy (2022)

=== 7" Singles ===
- Nothing to Envy b/w "Go to Gpd and Then" limited pressing of 500 copies (2023) self-released
