= Sailor Honeymoon =

South Korean punk band

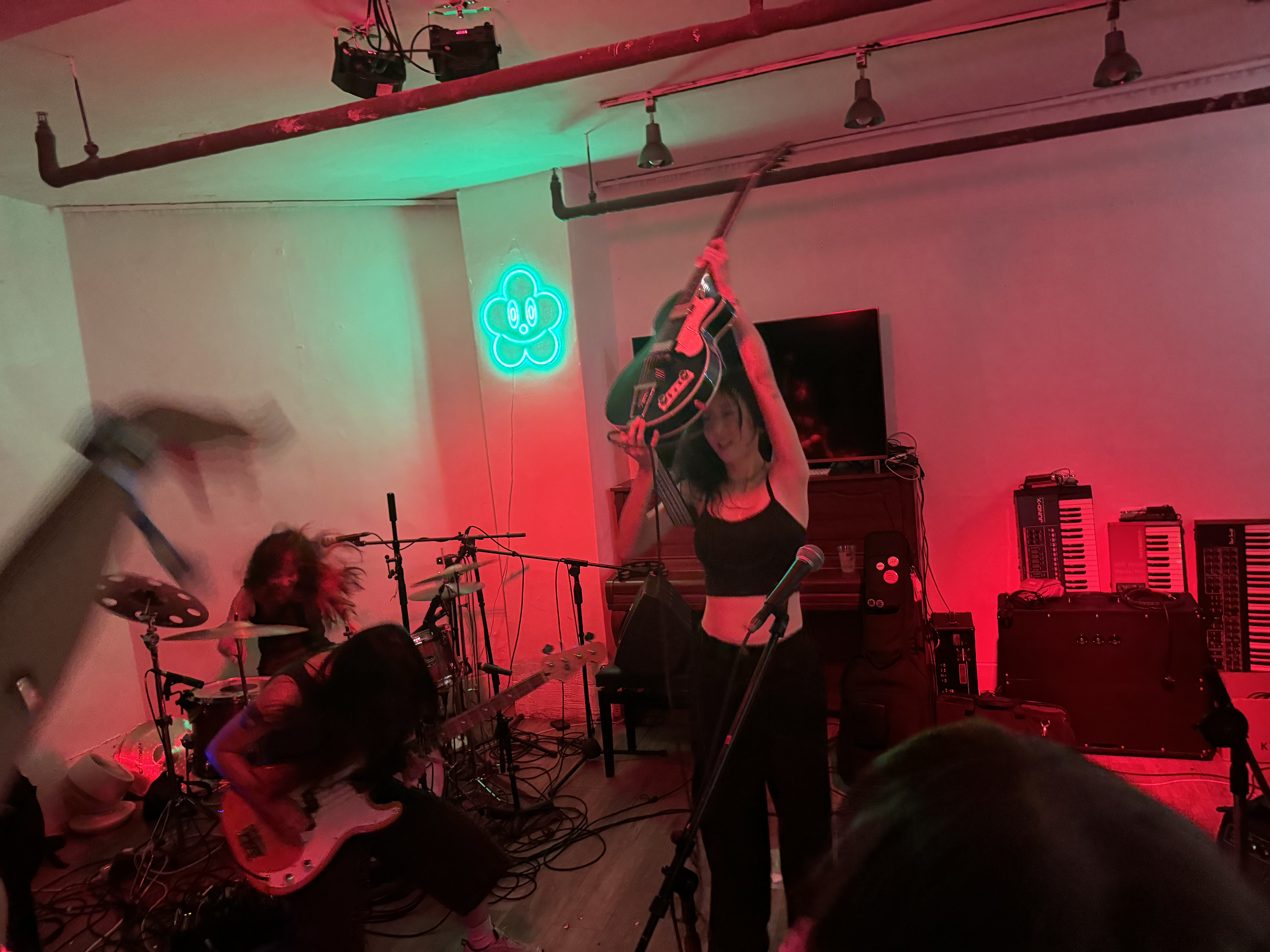
- Sailor Honeymoon performing at Block Party Music and Art Festival 2024

Background information
- Origin: Seoul, South Korea
- Genres: Punk rock; riot grrrl
- Years active: 2022-present
- Label: Good Good
- Members: Zaeeun Shin; Abi Raymaker; Kim Yerim
- Past members: Meaningful Stone; HUNJIYA; Mio Si

Sailor Honeymoon (Korean: 세일러 허니문) is a South Korean punk rock band, based in Seoul. The band currently consists of Abi Raymaker (drummer and vocalist), Zaeeun Shin (guitarist and vocalist) and Kim Yerim (bassist). Since their formation in 2022, the band has released the self-titled EP in 2024. Their music is classified as punk rock, and NME described their style of music as "while their short, sharp songs tackle the plights of patriarchy, periods and problematic friends, Sailor Honeymoon do so in a way that puts humour front and centre".

== History ==
Zaeeun and Abi first met at the South Korean concert hall Senggi Studio, at the time Abi was working on a video project and Zaeeun was DJing. They later formed a band by improvising with indie artists Meaningful Stone and HUNJIYA. Zaeeun is also a member of the band Gyojung, and Abi is also a member of the band Deadbeat Club.

They had their first performance at Block Party Music and Art Festival in 2022, and in 2023 they released their first single, Cockroach. On 10 January 2024, they released their second single, Bad Apple. They described the single as "about realising one of your friends is kind of a closed bigot." Their self-titled EP was released on 30 April. They performed at the Pentaport Rock Festival in South Korea, The Great Escape in England in 2024, and Primavera Sound in Spain in 2025.

== Members ==
=== Current members ===
- Abi Raymaker – drums, vocals
- Zaeeun Shin – guitar, vocals
- Kim Yerim – bass

=== Past members ===
- Meaningful Stone – bass
- HUNJIYA – bass
- Mio Si – bass

== Discography ==
=== Studio albums ===
- The Worst of Sailor Honeymoon (2026)

=== Extended plays ===
- Sailor Honeymoon (2024)
