= Slant (band) =

South Korean hardcore punk band

- Origin: Seoul, South Korea
- Genres: Hardcore punk
- Years active: 2018-present
- Labels: Iron Lung Records
- Members: Yeji; Yuying; Dongwoo; Garrett; Gunny

Slant (Korean: 슬랜트) is a South Korean hardcore punk band. Since their formation in 2018, the band has released a studio album 1집 (2021).

== Career ==
Slant debuted in 2018 when they released a demo album Demo 2018. The vocalist Yeji is a tattoo artist, and the other members have worked in other bands before. They signed with American record label Iron Lung Records, and released EP Vain Attempt in 2019.

In 2021, they released their first full-length album 1집. Dan Southgate of DIY Conspiracy described the album as "With the ten tracks on offer clocking in at around seventeen minutes, Slant manage to keep your attention throughout without having to cover too much sonic ground." The album was nominated for the Best Metal & Hardcore Album at the 2022 Korean Music Awards.

In 2023, they released their second demo album, Demo 2023, and Stereogum's Tom Breihan described them as "Slant is making revved-up, anthemic old-school hardcore punk".

== Discography ==
=== Studio albums ===
- 1집 (2021)

=== EPs ===
- Vain Attempt (2019)

=== Demo albums ===
- Demo 2018 (2018)
- Demo 2023 (2023)
