= Tengger (band) =

South Korean punk rock band

- Origin: South Korea
- Genres: Electronic
- Years active: 2005-present
- Labels: Busy Bodies
- Members: Itta; Marqido; Raai

Tengger (Korean: 텐거, stylised as TENGGER) is a South Korean electronic music band. The band consists of a couple, Korean musician Itta, and Japanese musician Marquido. Their son, Raai, later joined the band.

== History ==
Tengger was formed in 2005 by Itta and Marquido, with the band name 10 (Ten). The band's name was later changed after their son was born. The band name Tengger means "big sky without boundaries" in Mongolian.

They created an experimental style of work in 2014, including the release of Minishiko, which they recorded while touring temples in Japan. In 2019, they released their new album Spiritual 2, which Pitchfork described the band as "Tengger's music is fascination with devotional sound-making." In 2023, they released their new studio album TENGGER.

== Discography ==
=== Studio albums ===
- Minishiko (2014)
- Spiritual (2017)
- Segye (2017)
- Spiritual 2 (2019)
- Nomad (2020)
- Earthing (2022)
- TENGGER (2023)
