= Kimbanourke =

South Korean indie folk musician

- Born: 1999
- Origin: Mungyeong, North Gyeongsang Province, South Korea
- Genres: psychedelic folk, chamber pop
- Years active: 2023–present
- Label: Poclanos

Kimbanourke (Korean: 김반월키; born 1999) is a South Korean indie folk musician. He has released a studio album Absence (빈자리) (2024).

== Career ==
Kimbanourke was born and raised in Mungyeong. He made his 2023 debut under the name of May Lily through his debut album Your Embraces Were Warm. He began to gain popularity through his first studio album, Absence, Music critic Seo Jeongmingab reviewed the album as "Kimbanourke's extraordinary sound leads to different acceptance of situations and emotions expressed in lyrics."

In 2025, he released his new album Glad You’re Doing Well under the name of Mary Lily. He participated in the 10th anniversary compilation of Korean music label Poclanos.

== Musical style ==
Kimbanourke mentioned Tim Buckley, Jim O'Rourke and Sufjan Stevens as musicians affected. His music is classified as psychedelic folk and chamber pop.

== Discography ==
=== As May Lily / Mary Lily ===
Studio albums

- Your Embraces Were Warm (2023)
- Glad You’re Doing Well (2025)

=== As Kimbanourke ===
- Absence (빈자리) (2024)
