= 18Fevers =

Punk band from South Korea

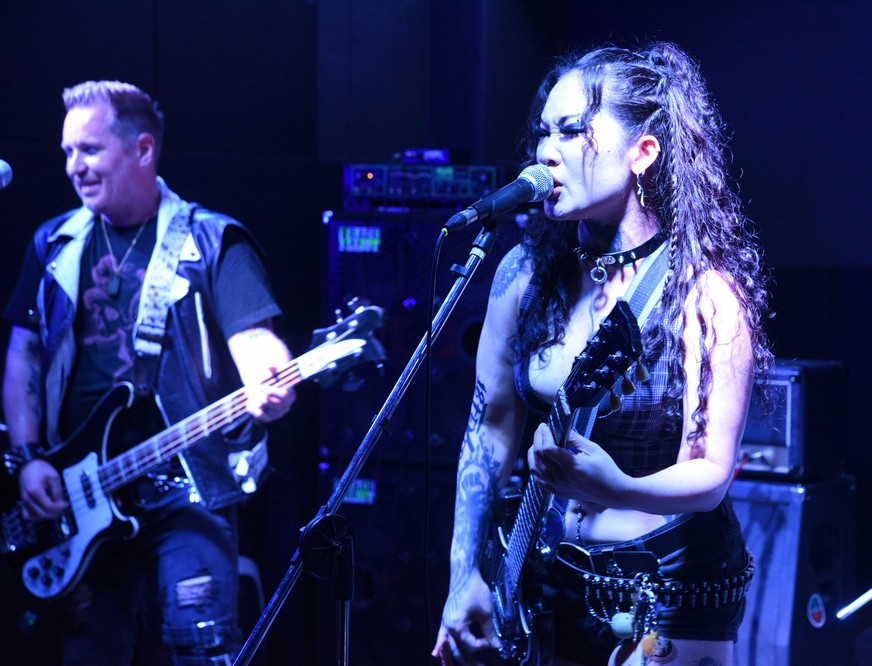
- 18Fevers performs at Club Victim in Hongdae, 30 June 2024.

Background information
- Origin: Seoul, South Korea
- Genre: punk
- Years active: 2021-current
- Members: Christmas Kwon (guitar, vocals), Mathew Nolan (bass), Garik Luallin (drums), Former Members: SAAE (lead guitar), Yuhee (lead guitar), Jennifer Ward (lead guitar)

18Fevers (Korean: 18피버스) is a punk rock band from Seoul, South Korea, formed in 2021. The band quickly gained an international following for their unique blend of punk, goth, and dance-punk elements. They termed this sound "Death Punk Disco," initially as a joke.

The band has toured the UK and US. It has also performed with several touring international bands in Korea, including Steve Caballero's band Urethane, We Outspoken, War Lovers, and US ska-punk supergroup Mutiny.

== Rebellion Festival ==
18Fevers was included on the lineup at Rebellion Festival 2023, 2024, and 2026.

The band got its first chance to play Rebellion Festival several years after bassist Mathew Nolan submitted his previous band, Gumiho, to play in 2019, before the pandemic struck and Gumiho broke up. Having established a relationship with festival organisers, he was able to get 18Fevers invited in 2023.

== Music ==
18Fevers has collaborated with various other musicians. Christmas and former member SAAE provided guest vocals on the Rumkicks song "Proud of Madness".

Former member SAAE, the band's founding guitarist, came out to her bandmates as transgender early in the band's history. Christmas also provided vocals on a track for the US ska-punk band Mutiny.

18Fevers wrote the song "Let Me Live" as an anti-transphobia anthem, dedicated to Byun Hui-su, who took her own life in 2021 after being discharged from the ROK Army. The song was featured on the 2026 knifetwister records benefit compilation Not In Our City 2.

== Discography ==
=== Albums ===
- Tactical (2026) single
- Death: Live ‘26 (2026) live EP featuring 7 songs recorded live in Seoul
- The Collection (2025) vinyl collection of all past recordings
- Burn Like Fire (2024) collab with Fat Hamster
- Cut Me Up (2024) 3-song EP
- Death Punk Disco (2023) 5-song EP
- Danse Macabre (2023) Fat Hamster remix
- Save Your Venom (2022) 3-song EP
- Danse Macabre (2022) single
- Nothing Helps (2021) single
