= Kontrajelly =

South Korean new wave music band

- Origin: South Korea
- Genres: new wave music; indie rock
- Years active: 2015-present
- Label: Mirrorball
- Members: Shin Yoojeong; Kim Yeongoo
- Past members: Shin Gwanyong; Park Hyeonwook

Kontrajelly (Korean: 콘트라젤리) is a South Korean new wave music band. The band consists of Shin Yoojeong and Kim Yeongoo. Since their formation in 2015, the band has released three studio albums Rhetoric (미사여구뿐) (2024), Konsequence (2025) and Koprime (서로소) (2026).

== History ==
Kontrajelly was formed in 2015, and they released an EP Sequence the same year. They released their first studio album Rhetoric (미사여구뿐) in 2024. Yves of Tonplein described the track Floral Shoes as "It's a track that recklessly throws a melody and goes on the road as if the place our feet touch is the road".

In 2025, they released their second studio album, Konsequence. They described their music as "tesco Rock," a term combining techno, disco, and rock. In 2026, they released their third studio album, Koprime.

== Discography ==
=== Studio albums ===
- Rhetoric (미사여구뿐) (2024)
- Konsequence (2025)
- Koprime (서로소) (2026)
