= Wah Wah Wah =

South Korean psychedelic rock band

- Origin: Seoul, South Korea
- Genres: Psychedelic rock
- Years active: 2021-present
- Labels: Good Boy Records
- Members: Kim Soohyeon; Seo Wonseok; Lee Joonseob; Choi Woonghee; Oh Hamking
- Past members: Jeong Bongkil

Wah Wah Wah (Korean: 와와와; RR: Wawawa) is a South Korean psychedelic rock band. The band currently consists of Kim Soohyeon, Seo Wonseok, Lee Joonseob, Choi Woonghee and Oh Hamking. Since their formation in 2021, the band has released three studio albums Oh, Wow! (2021), Midnight Breakfast (2022) and Burnt Crispy Beats (2024).

== Career ==
Wah Wah Wah was formed by Kim Soohyeon, a former leader of DTSQ. Choi Woonghee is a member of Silica Gel, Lee Joonseob is a member of DSTQ, and Seo Wonseok is a member of Dead Buttons. They released their first full album Oh, Wow! in 2021.

They released Midnight Breakfast in 2022 and their third album Burnt Crispy Beats, which was influenced by krautrock, in 2024. They performed at Korean festivals such as DMZ Peace Train Music Festival and Countdown Fantasy. They have participated in the Korea Spotlight, a programme to support the overseas expansion of Korean pop music held in Australia.

== Members ==
=== Current members ===
- Kim Soohyeon – guitar, vocals
- Seo Wonseok – drums
- Lee Joonseob – bass
- Choi Woonghee – guitar
- Oh Hamking – vjing

=== Past members ===
- Jeong Bongkil – bass

== Discography ==
=== Studio albums ===
- Oh, Wow! (2021)
- Midnight Breakfast (2022)
- Burnt Crispy Beats (2024)
