= Snake Chicken Soup =

South Korean alternative rock band

- Origin: South Korea
- Genres: alternative rock
- Years active: 2022-present
- Members: Choi Wonbin; Choi Seok; Park Jongyong

Snake Chicken Soup (Korean: 스네이크치킨수프) is a South Korean alternative rock band consisting of Choi Wonbin, Choi Seok, and Park Jongyong. Formed in 2022, the band has released one studio album, Homemade Fast Food (2024).

== History ==
Snake Chicken Soup formed in 2022. Choi Wonbin was previously a member of Wetter, Choi Seok was a member of Getto Bombs, and Park Jongyong worked with Idiotape under the name DR. In 2023, the band released the EP 보양 補陽. They performed at the 2024 DMZ Peace Train Music Festival and released their debut studio album Homemade Fast Food later that year.

== Discography ==
=== Studio albums ===
- Homemade Fast Food (2024)
