= Bulgogi Disco =

South Korean indie rock band

- Origin: South Korea
- Genres: indie rock
- Years active: 2019-present
- Label: EMA
- Members: Lee Hyunsong; Kim Donghyeon; Kim Hyeongkyoon; Hwang Seongwook

Bulgogi Disco (Korean: 불고기디스코) is a South Korean indie rock band. The band consists of Lee Hyunsong, Kim Donghyeon, Kim Hyeongkyoon and Hwang Seongwook. Since their formation in 2019, the band has released a studio album BULGOG!D!SCO (2019).

== History ==
Bulgogi Disco was formed in 2019. Lee Hyunsong, a member of the band, was a member of the Koxx. They released their first studio album BULGOG!D!SCO in the same year. In 2021, they released the COVID-19 pandemic themed EP DISCOVID. In 2023, they released an EP, DAGAGA.

== Musical style ==
Bulgogi Disco is described as a band that makes records based on disco sounds from the 1970s and 1980s.

== Discography ==
=== Studio albums ===
- BULGOG!D!SCO (2019)

=== EPs ===
- DISCOVID (2021)
- DAGAGA (2023)
