= XTIE =

Hong Kong singer and songwriter (born 1994/1995)

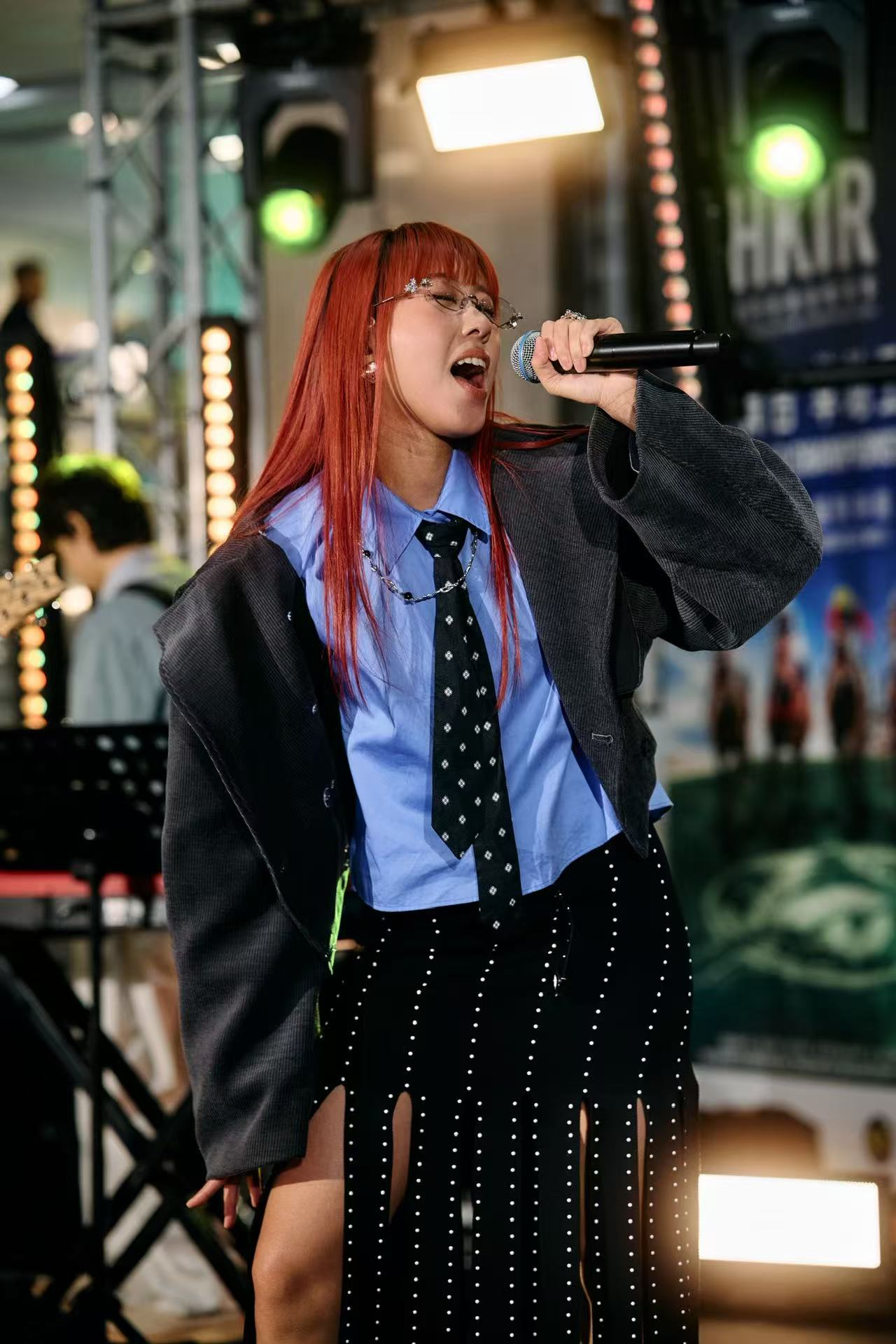
- XTIE in Sha Tin Racecourse, 2025

Background information
- Born: Cristie Lam; 1994 or 1995 (age 30–31); British Hong Kong
- Genres: Pop, electropop, dance-pop, indie pop
- Occupations: Singer, record producer, composer, lyricist, arranger
- Instruments: Vocals, piano, synthesizer
- Years active: 2016–present (music producer); 2020–present (artist)
- Label: Solar Rye Records (self-owned)
- Website: https://www.xtieofficial.com/

Cristie Lam (born 1994/1995), known professionally as XTIE, is a Hong Kong record producer, singer, and songwriter. Her musical style incorporates dance-pop, electronic music, House, Drum & Bass, and UK garage.

== Life and career ==
=== Early life and education ===
XTIE was born and raised in Hong Kong. She learned to play the piano and synthesizers, and participated in musical theatre.

=== 2016–2020: Career Beginnings ===
After graduating from University, she started producing and writing for school plays, community musical theatre while having a full time office job on the side.

=== 2020–2024: Pop Music Production and APOLLO-23 ===
XTIE began her pop music career in music production, working on projects including the theme song for the ViuTV television program King Maker IV (2021). She has collaborated with Hong Kong artists such as Janice Vidal and Alfred Hui.

She debuted as a solo artist in 2020 with the single "Flower Town". She subsequently released several singles, including "Virgo". In 2023, XTIE released her debut EP, APOLLO-23, which included the singles "Spaceship", "Skin", and "Field of Gold". The track "Skin" was featured in the Recording Academy's Press Play series; she was the first artist from Hong Kong to appear in the series. She performed at the FOCUS Wales festival in 2023.

In 2024, XTIE released the single "Lost in Between" in collaboration with Finnish songwriter and musician Anniina Timonen. It was described as addressing themes such as imposter syndrome and the experiences of under-represented artists in the music industry. The collaboration began after the two artists first met at a K-pop songwriting camp in 2021 during the COVID-19 pandemic, initially working together remotely before later meeting in person in Seoul to film the song's music video.

=== 2025–present: Rocket Science and relocation to Los Angeles ===
In August 2025, her single "Rocket Science" was included on the Spotify editorial playlist It's a Hit!. At the same year, XTIE released 852+, a single exploring the complex emotions of migration across Third culture kids and the wider diaspora. . In October 2025, she released the self-produced single Star Potential, co-written with Anniina Timonen. Blending UK garage with Cantonese folk motifs, the track explores themes of ambition, self-doubt, and the personal sacrifices of pursuing an international music career while away from home during the Mid-Autumn Festival. In May 2026, she followed up with the single Attachment Theory. Both tracks, along with her previous release Rocket Science were included as singles for her forthcoming debut album.

In April 2026, she headlined her first sold out show in Hong Kong The Rocket Science Experiment

In August 2026, XTIE announced her relocation to Los Angeles after obtaining permanent residency in the United States through an Extraordinary Ability visa to further her music career. On August 7, 2026, she released a dance-pop and house remixed cover of Joey Yung's hit "心花怒放" (Bloom) as a farewell song to Hong Kong, sung in Cantonese.

== Artistry ==
Her work spans genres including dance-pop, House, Drum & Bass, and UK Garage. Her track Star Potential combines UK Garage with elements of Cantonese folk melodies.

== Personal life ==
XTIE has eczema. She has stated that the condition influenced her perspective on body image and served as inspiration for her 2023 single "Skin."

== Discography ==
=== As lead artist ===
==== Extended plays ====
- APOLLO-23 (2023)

Album
APOLLO-23 (EP)
Details
- Release Date: 2 June 2023
- Label: XTIE
- Formats: CD, digital download, streaming

No.	Title	Writer(s)	Producer(s)	Length
1.	"Flower Town"	XTIE	XTIE	3:26
2.	"Spaceship"			3:23
3.	"Virgo"			3:36
4.	"Skin"			3:48
5.	"#FF"			3:49
6.	"麥田看守員"	XTIE, Chung Suet Ying		3:31
7.	"Cloud 9"	XTIE	XTIE, Kepatime	5:05
Total length:				26:42

- Xmas Night Shift (2024)

Album
Xmas Night Shift (EP)
Details
- Release Date: 13 December 2024
- Label: Solar Rye Records/The Cutest Label
- Formats: digital download, streaming

No.	Title	Writer(s)	Producer(s)	Length
1.	"Santa why are you so late?"	Julita Kusy, XTIE	XTIE	2:36
2.	"Christmas Miracle"	Julita Kusy		2:35
3.	"Miranda"	XTIE		2:40
4.	"No More You Under My Xmas Tree"			3:05
Total length:				10:58

==== Singles ====
- "Flower Town" (2020)
- "Virgo" (2020)
- "Spaceship" (2023)
- "Skin" (2023)
- "Field of Gold (麥田看守員)" (2023)
- "New Classic" (2023)
- "Lost in Between" (2024)
- "Crying on the Plane" (2024)
- "+852" (2025)
- "Rocket Science" (2025)
- "Star Potential" (2025)
- "Anti Gravity" (2025)
- "Attachment Theory" (2026)
- "Bloom (心花怒放)" (2026)
