= Crystal Tea =

South Korean indie rock musician

- Born: Cha Soojeong; 25 November 1990 (age 35)
- Origin: Busan, South Korea
- Genres: Indie rock, pop rock
- Years active: 2014–present
- Label: Poclanos

Cha Soojeong (Korean: 차수정; born 25 November 1990), better known by her stage name Crystal Tea (크리스탈 티), is a South Korean indie rock musician. She has released a studio album High School Musical (하이스쿨 뮤지컬) (2024).

== Career ==
Crystal Tea was born in Busan in 1990. Her commercial debut came with the two-track single Boys' Caravan (보이즈 캐러밴) on 13 February 2014. She returned with the extended play Pink Movie (핑크 무비) in May 2020. A follow-up, Pink Movie Director’s Cut, appeared in 2021.

Crystal Tea released her first studio album, High School Musical (하이스쿨 뮤지컬), on 17 August 2024. Korean music webzine IZM reviewed the album, describing it as a diary-like, high-teen film-inspired collection that distils adolescent feelings with bright but finely drawn writing.

== Discography ==
=== Studio albums ===
- High School Musical (하이스쿨 뮤지컬) (2024)

=== EPs ===
- Pink Movie (핑크 무비) (2020)
- Pink Movie Director's Cut (핑크 무비 감독판) (2021)
