= Cadejo (band) =

South Korean funk band

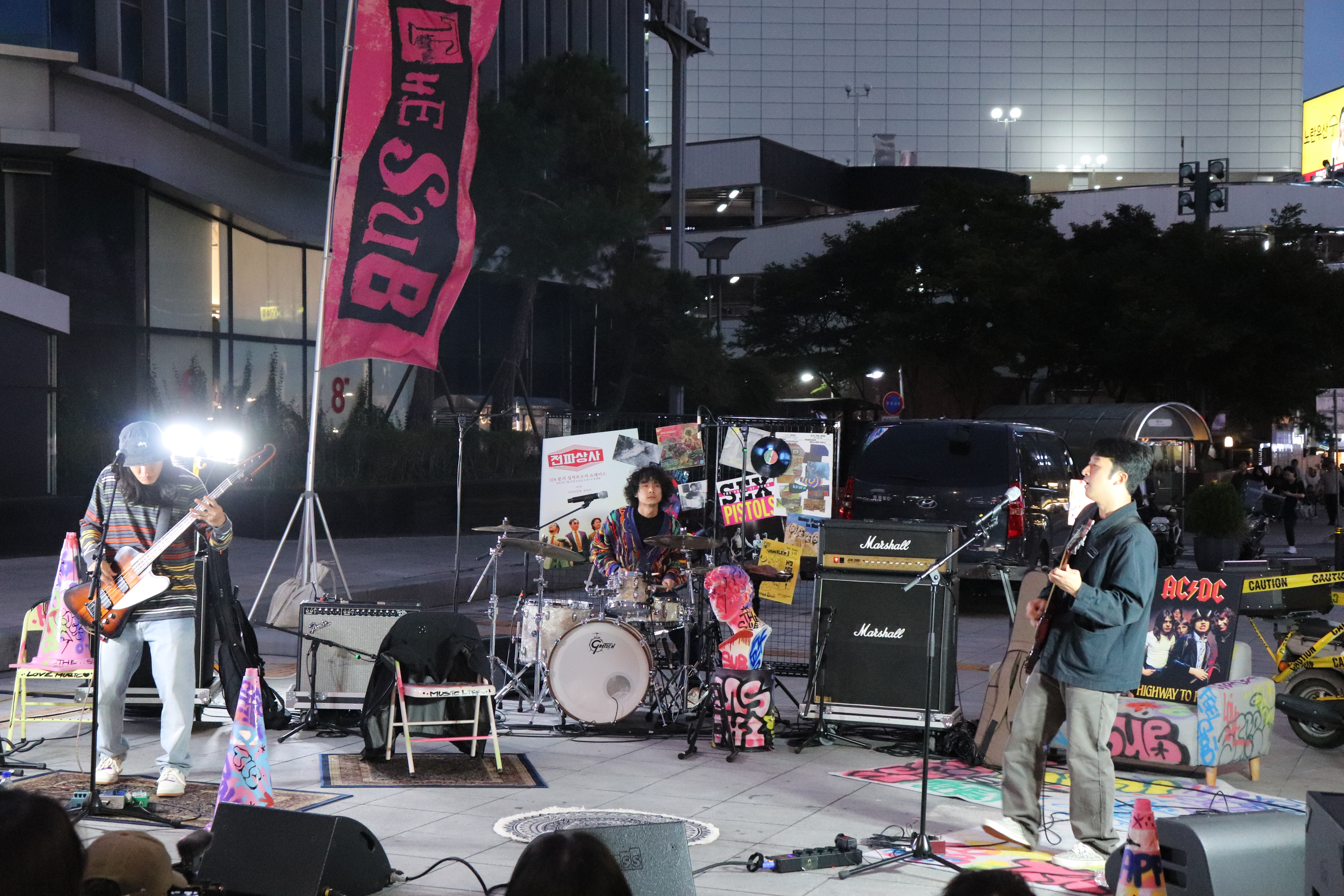
- Cadejo performing at The Sub Festival 2023

Background information
- Origin: Seoul, South Korea
- Genres: Funk; blues rock
- Years active: 2017-present
- Labels: Tron Music; Poclanos
- Members: Lee Taehoon; Kim Jaeho; Kim Dabin
- Past members: Camelo

Cadejo (Korean: 까데호) is a South Korean funk band. The band currently consists of Lee Taehoon, Kim Jaeho and Kim Dabin. Since their formation in 2017, the band has released three studio albums: Freesummer (2019), Freebody (2020) and Freeverse (2023). They also released their collaboration EP Sincerely Yours (2022) with rapper Nucksal, and their collaboration album Gangnam Oasis (2022) with Lee Hee-moon.

== Career ==
Cadejo was formed in 2017. The band members come from various bands, including Funkafric Booster, Airship and NuTrip. They released an EP Mixtape in 2018.

In 2019, they released their first studio album Freesummer, Kim Doheon of IZM described the album as "Cadejo brought together a dense completeness and a pleasant vibe in this album.". The album was nominated for the Golden Indie Music Awards in Taiwan. They performed with rock band BAADA on The EBS space.

In 2020, they released their second studio album Freebody through Tron Music. The album was nominated for Best R&B & Soul Album at the 2021 Korean Music Awards. They released an EP Sincerely Yours (당신께) in 2022 with rapper Nucksal, the album won Best Rap & Hip Hop Album, and track Good Morning Seoul (굿모닝 서울) won Best Rap & Hip Hop Song at the 2023 Korean Music Awards. They performed at the DMZ Peace Train Music Festival in October. They released their collaboration album Gangnam Oasis (강남 오아시스) with fusion gugak musician Lee Hee-moon.

In 2023, Guitarist Lee Taehoon participated in Jowall's new single Seol-i (설이). they released their third studio album Freeverse.

== Discography ==
=== Studio albums ===
- Freesummer (2019)
- Freebody (2020)
- Gangnam Oasis (강남 오아시스) (2022) (with Lee Hee-moon)
- Freeverse (2023)

=== EPs ===
- Mixtape (2018)
- Sincerely Yours (당신께) (2022) (with Nucksal)
