= Kim Il Du =

South Korean folk musician

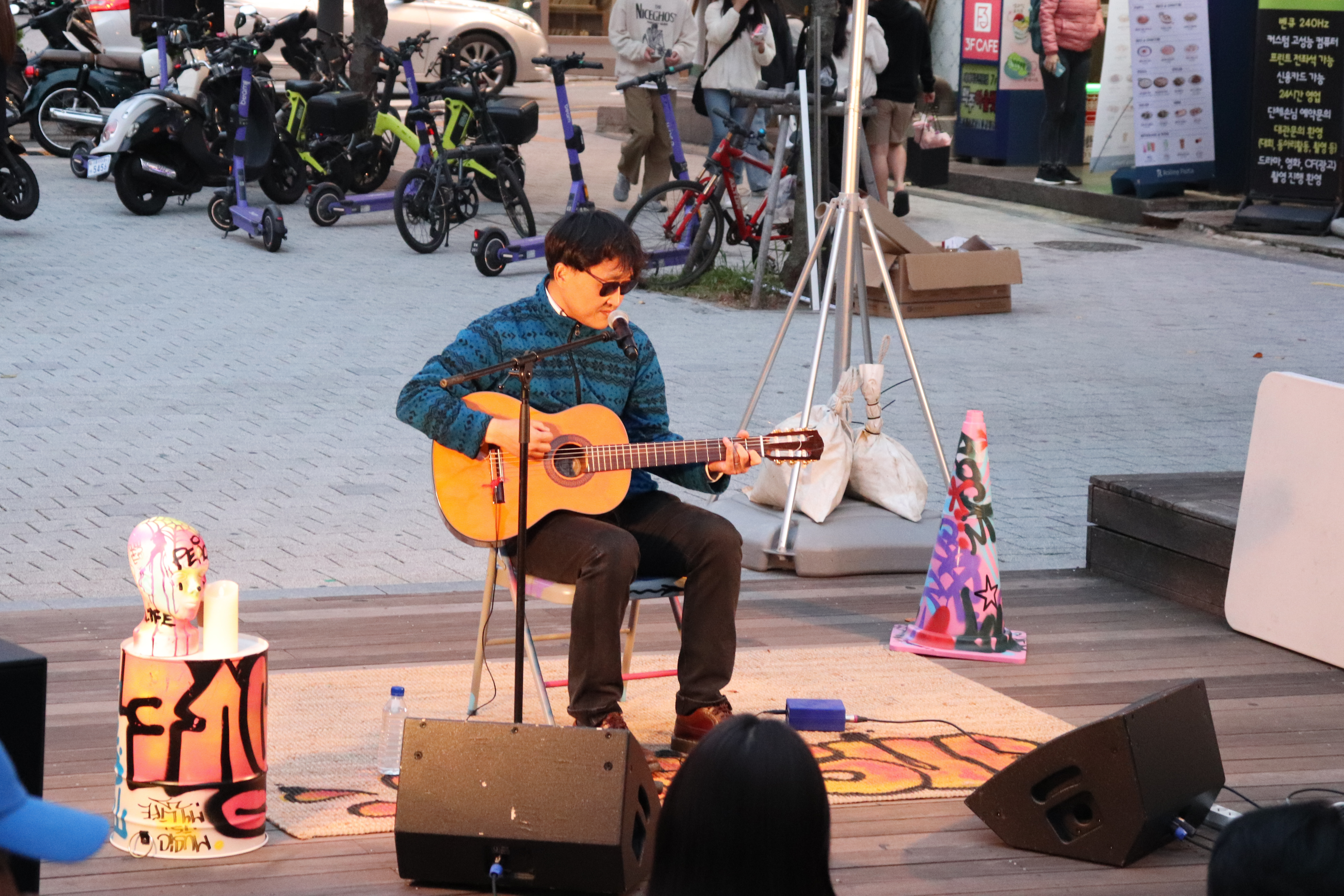
- Kim Il Du performing at The Sub Festival 2023

Background information
- Born: August 13, 1978 (age 46)
- Origin: Busan, South Korea
- Genres: Folk music
- Years active: 2011–present
- Labels: BGBG Records; CTR Sound

Kim Il Du (Korean: 김일두) (born 13 August 1978) is a South Korean folk singer-songwriter. He debuted as a member of punk band Suspens, The hustlers and Genius, and released his first solo EP No Problem (문제없어요) in 2011. His album Soul of Moon and Star (달과 별의 영혼) (2015) was nominated for the 2016 Best Folk Album at the 2016 Korean Music Awards.

== Career ==
Kim Il-doo was born in Busan in 1978. Prior to his solo debut, he was a member of a punk band called Suspens, The hustlers and Genius, and his solo EP No Problem (문제없어요) was released in 2011. He released his first studio album A Pretty and Clear Soul (곱고 맑은 영혼) in 2013.

In 2015, he released his second studio album, Soul of Moon and Star (달과 별의 영혼) through BGBG Records. Hong Eunsol of IZM described the album as a "Inside the pretty words "moon" and "star," the "inner side of the times" is definitely wriggling." The album was nominated for Best Folk Album at the 2016 Korean Music Awards.

He released his third studio album, Dream in Dream (꿈 속 꿈) In 2020, and his fourth studio album New Season (새 계절) in 2021. He worked with Kim Changhee and Engler Hashim on the electronica album I AM NOT I. Kim Il Du participated in Say Sue Me's album The Last Thing Left and saxophonist Kim Oki's album Love Flower. He formed a band called Kim Il Du and Bulsechul (김일두와 불세출) and performed at the DMZ Peace Train Music Festival in 2022 and the Pentaport Rock Festival in 2023.

== Discography ==
=== Studio albums ===
- A Pretty and Clear Soul (곱고 맑은 영혼) (2013)
- Soul of Moon and Star (달과 별의 영혼) (2015)
- Dream in Dream (꿈 속 꿈) (2020)
- New Season (새 계절) (2021)

=== EPs ===
- No Problem (문제없어요) (2011)
