= Zandari Festa =

Music festival in Seoul, South Korea

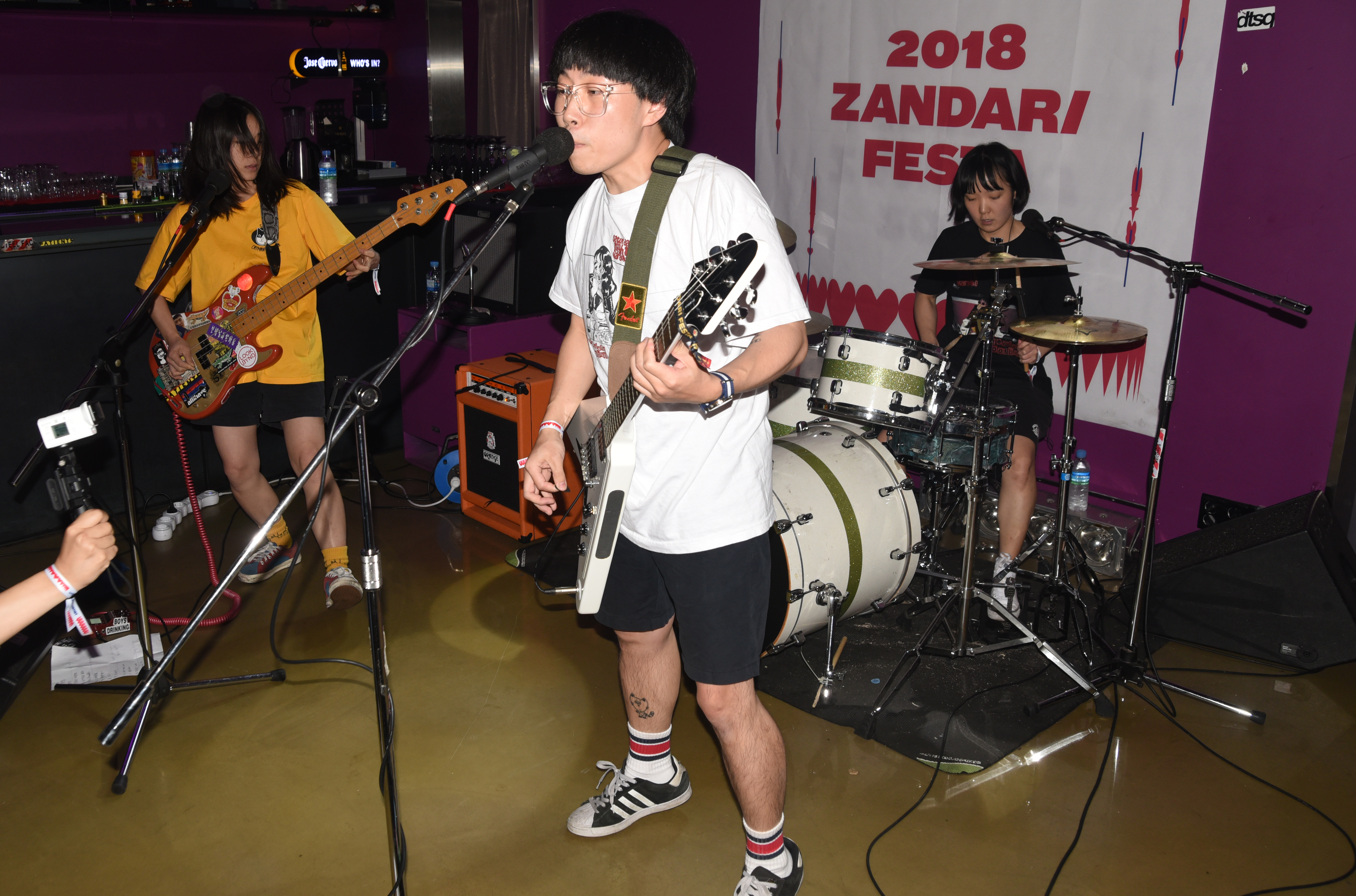
- Daegu skatepunk band Drinking Boys and Girls Choir perform in Club Steel Face at Zandari Festa 2018 on Oct. 6, 2018.
- Genre: Rock, Alternative rock, Indie rock, World music, Punk rock, Electronic music, Folk music, Hip hop
- Dates: Fall
- Locations: Hongdae, Seoul, South Korea
- Years active: 2012 - present
- Website: Zandari Festa

Zandari Festa is a three-day music festival and showcase held in various live music venues and other locations in the area around Hongik University in Seoul.

Every year, it offers around 100 music acts from Korea and around the world, as well as music industry delegates representing festivals and labels. In cooperation with foreign embassies, each year it offers national showcases. There are also conference events, secret shows, and various other networking events throughout the festival. There are many networking opportunities and a lot of deals get made at or because of Zandari. The 2019 edition features a Focus Wales showcase and a Music BC showcase from British Columbia, Canada.

The 2015 event saw 261 acts playing in two dozen venues. The 2016 event had over 160 bands, 56 of which represented 18 foreign countries, with 163 individual concerts at 12 venues. In 2018 the number of music acts was capped at 100 and the music venues were reduced in order to improve the experience, including for the over 60 delegates.

The festival coincides with Mu:Con, another Korean music showcase more closely run by the government, and foreign delegates are able to attend both.

The Korean organizers in 2018 also started DMZ Peace Train Music Festival.

== Name ==
Zandari is a historic name for the area. Zandari means "small bridge," and its presence is still marked in local neighborhoods Seogyo-dong and Donggyo-dong, signifying the west and east sides of a stream that used to run through the area.

Many streets and other place names take their name from Zandari, including West Bridge Live Hall which is a literal English translation of Zandari.

The use of the name was intended to evoke a bridge that closes the gap between Korea and the outside world.

"Festa" is a word commonly used in Korea for festival.

== Location ==
The list of venues changes every year due to a high turnover rate of businesses in the area.

The Hongdae area had been known as ground zero for Korea's indie music scene, but gentrification has weakened its prominence.

== Notable events ==
Former Sex Pistols bassist Glen Matlock performed at Zandari 2018.

In 2017, Elis Paprika became the first Mexican artist to perform at Zandari Festa, with a show at SangSang Madang. She went back to Zandari Festa in 2018, and performed at The Convent.

Many Korean acts have made useful industry connections at the festival, being invited to play overseas festivals or signing record deals, including Busan's Say Sue Me and Daegu's Drinking Boys and Girls Choir.

In 2013, K-pop group Crayon Pop made a surprise appearance, performing with metal band L.O.D.

== See also ==
- List of music festivals in South Korea
- List of music festivals
