= Rumkicks =

All-girl punk band from South Korea

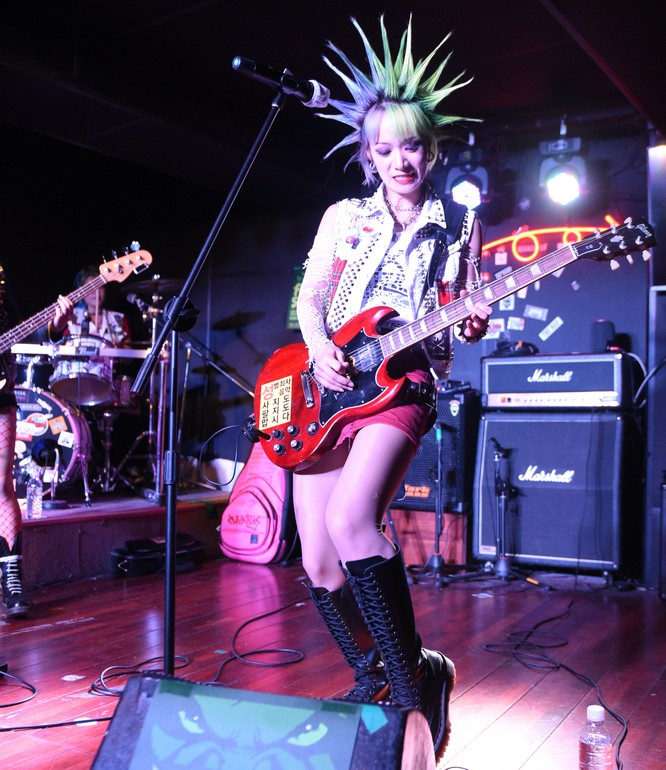
- Yeawon of Rumkicks performs at Boojik in Gwangju, Korea, 11 February 2023

Background information
- Origin: Seoul, South Korea
- Genres: punk
- Years active: 2018-current
- Label: SBÄM
- Members: Jeong Yeawon (guitar, vocals)

Rumkicks (Korean: 럼킥스) is a punk rock band from Seoul, South Korea, formed in 2018 by Jeong Yeawon and bassist Choi Seun.

The name Rumkicks was chosen to be something neutral that doesn't hint at the members' gender. Yeawon said it doesn't have any deeper meaning, and she doesn't particularly like rum. She added that she took some inspiration from Australian band The Rumjacks.

Known for their spiky look and genuine, fed-up lyrics that address social issues and mental health, Rumkicks have turned heads all around the world. They have toured extensively, including the UK, the US, Europe, China, and Japan.

They've been included on the lineup at Rebellion Festival 2022, 2023 and 2024. At their debut appearance in 2022, they wore hanbok.

== History ==
Yeawon started listening to punk music in elementary school. To hide her punk lifestyle, she wears a black wig at work.

During a January 2023 Indonesia tour, Yeawon was hit in the head with a water bottle thrown from the crowd, between songs while she was talking about struggling for acceptance in the punk scene. The perpetrator was identified and kicked out of his band.

On April 2, 2025, the band signed to SBÄM Records.

== Music ==
Rumkicks' sound is alternatingly described as pogo punk and pop-punk. They have often described their sound as "post-Chosun punk," named after the "Chosun punk" sound of pioneering Korean punk label Drug Records in the 1990s.

Some of their negative experiences and mistreatment as women in the punk scene have inspired their songs.

When someone touched Yeawon's hair spikes without permission, it triggered a conflict that inspired the song "Don't Touch My Head."

When a Facebook group named "Punk is Everywhere" shared their photos without permission, they received many negative comments. In response, they released the song "Punk is Nowhere."

They are strong proponents of mental health, having released the song "Proud of madness" featuring members of fellow Korean punk band 18Fevers.

Recently, Rumkicks was featured on a song intended as an anthem for women by Canadian punk band Bad Skin.

== Discography ==
=== Albums ===
- Hit A Nerve (SBÄM Records, 2025)
