= Fat Hamster & Kang New =

South Korean electronic musical duo

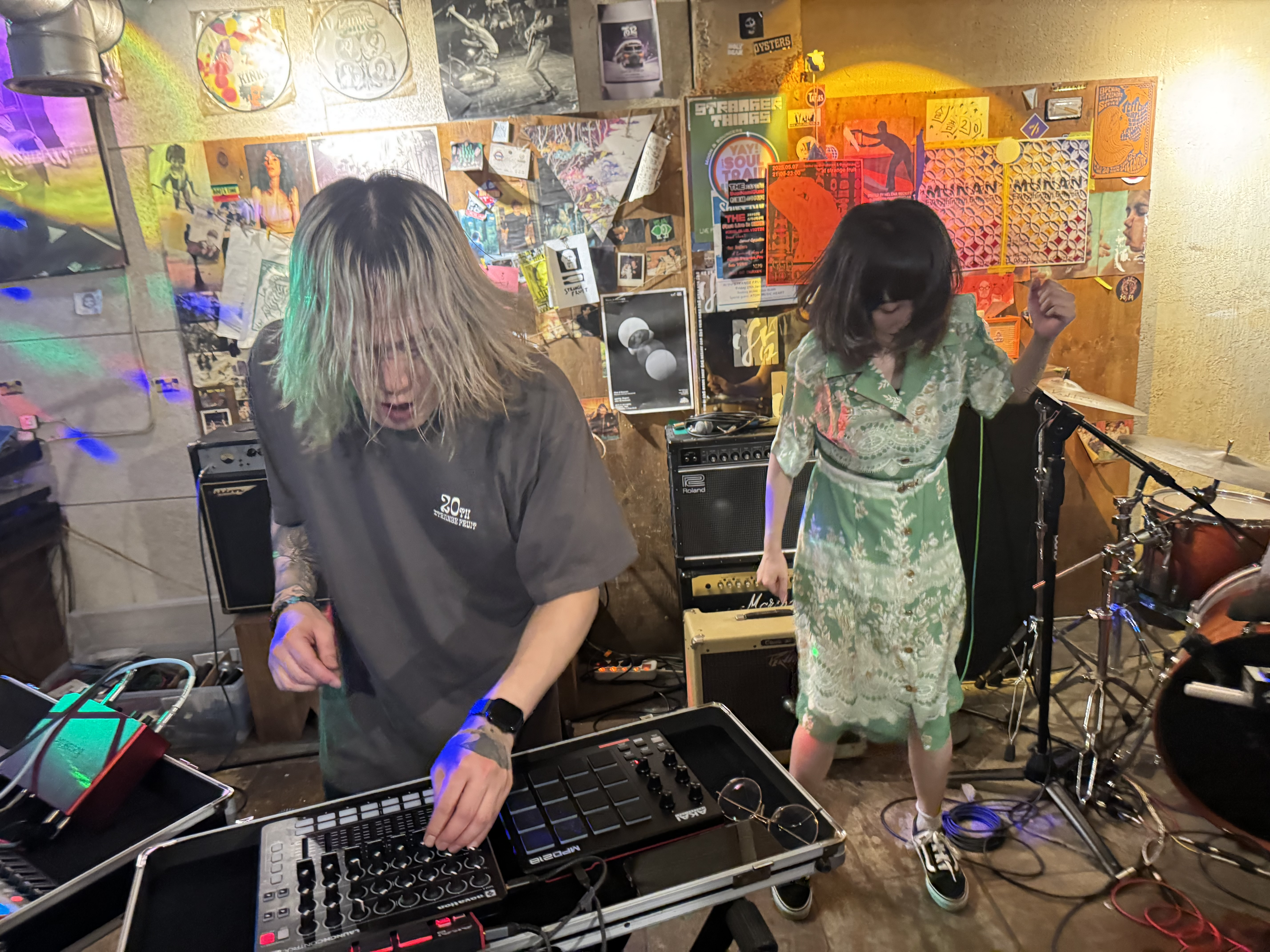
- Fat Hamster & Kang New in 2025

Background information
- Origin: Seoul, South Korea
- Genres: Electronic
- Years active: 2016-present
- Label: LetzRatz
- Members: Fat Hamster; Kang New

Fat Hamster & Kang New (Korean: 팻햄스터 & 캉뉴) is a South Korean electronic musical duo. The band currently consists of Fat Hamster and Kang New. The group has released a studio album Brains in a Vat (2025).

== Career ==
Fat Hamster and Kang New have collaborated frequently since establishing the indie label LetzRatz in 2016. Fat Hamster was a vocalist of a rock band and majored in classical music. They completed a successful tour in Japan in 2023, and also participated in remixes of 18Fevers and HarryBigButton.

They released their first single, Live Fast, Die Young, on 24 April 2025 under the group. Their first studio album, Brains in a Vat, was released on 9 May. They toured including major Korean festivals such as the Asian Pop Festival.

== Discography ==
=== Studio albums ===
- Brains in a Vat (2025)
