= Goonamguayeoridingstella =

South Korean psychedelic rock band

- Origin: Seoul, South Korea
- Genres: psychedelic rock
- Years active: 2005-2025
- Members: Joh Ung; Kim Jeongwook; Yoo Joohyeon; Ahn Hongin; Lee Jihyang
- Past members: Lee Kihak; Lim Byeonghak; Park Taesik; Kim Naeon; Lee Seola

Goonamguayeoridingstella (Korean: 구남과여라이딩스텔라), also known as Goonam, is a South Korean psychedelic rock band. The band currently consists of Joh Ung, Kim Jeongwook, Yoo Joohyeon, Ahn Hongin and Lee Jihyang. Since their formation in 2005, the band has released four studio albums We Are Clean (우리는 깨끗하다; 2007), Friendship Motel (우정모텔; 2011), Sun Power (썬파워; 2015), Moraenae Fantasy (모래내판타지; 2019) and 1969 (2023).

== Career ==
Goonamguayeoridingstella was formed in 2005 by Joh Ung and Lim Byeonghak. The band's name means "the old man and woman rode stella". They released their first studio album We Are Clean (우리는 깨끗하다) in 2007. In 2011, they released their second studio album, Friendship Motel (우정모텔), which the Korean Music Awards nominated for best modern rock album, describing as "Goonam is a group that has established their own format and content that is hard to find in Korean music".

They founded label Asia Records, and released their third studio album, Sun Power (썬파워), in 2015. In 2019, they released their fourth studio album Moraenae Fantasy (모래내판타지). They said they had their studio in the Moraenae Market in Seodaemun-gu, where they recorded an album for a year. In 2023, they released their fifth studio album, '1969'. In September 2025, they announced that they would go around the rest of the tour and then disband.

== Discography ==
=== Albums ===
- We Are Clean (우리는 깨끗하다; 2007)
- Friendship Motel (우정모텔; 2011)
- Sun Power (썬파워; 2015)
- Moraenae Fantasy (모래내판타지; 2019)
- 1969 (2023)
