= Drinking Boys and Girls Choir =

Three-piece punk band from Daegu, South Korea

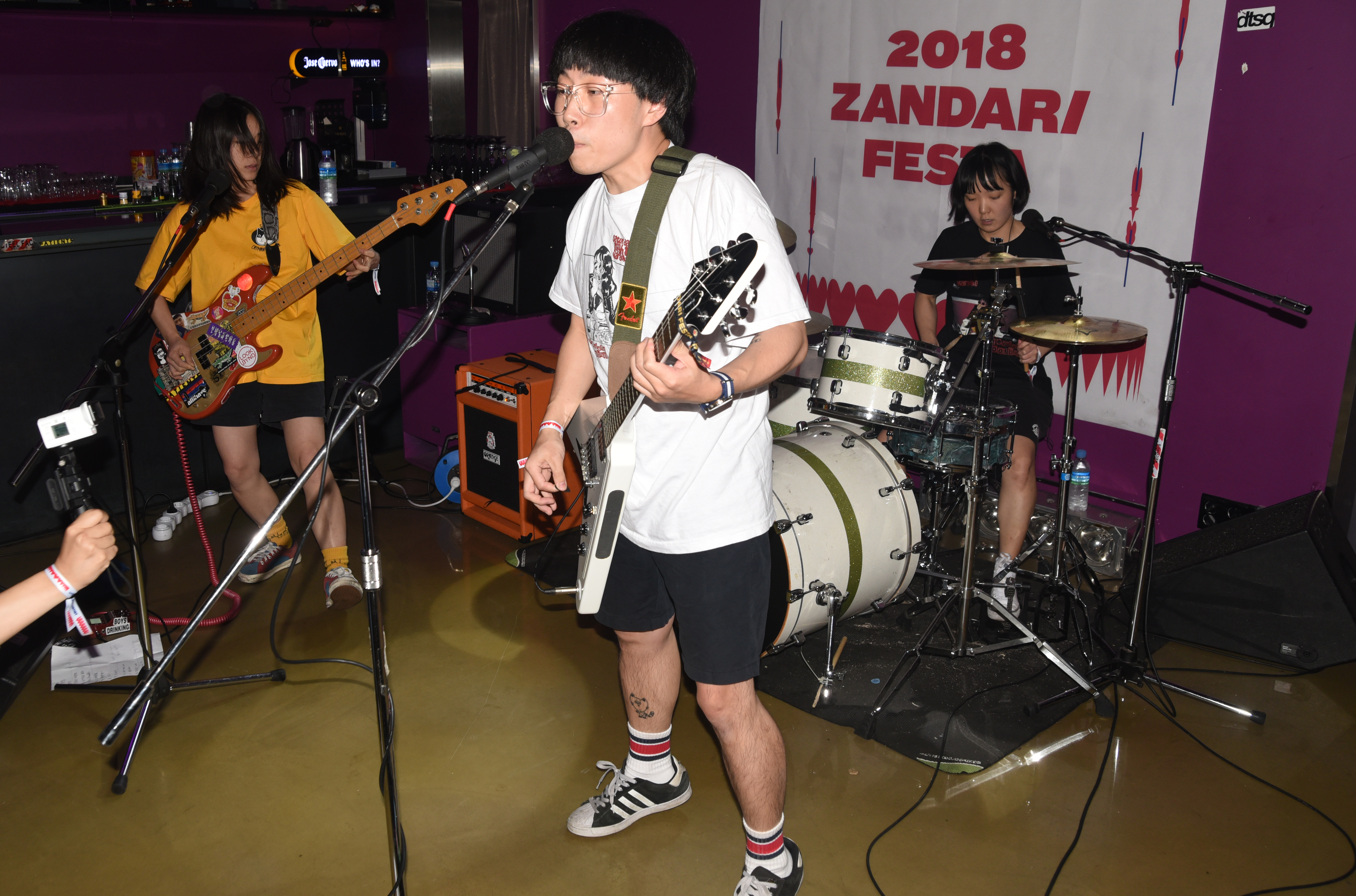
- Drinking Boys and Girls Choir performing in Seoul South Korea, 2018 (L-R: Meena Bae, former member Bondu Seo, Myeong-jin Kim)

Background information
- Also known as: DBGC
- Origin: Daegu, South Korea
- Genres: punk, skate punk
- Years active: 2012-current
- Label: Damnably
- Members: Meena Bae (bass, vocals); Myeong-jin Kim (drums, vocals); Megan Nisbet (guitar, vocals)
- Website: https://drinkingboysandgirlschoir.com/

Drinking Boys and Girls Choir is a punk rock band from Daegu, South Korea, made up of bassist/singer Meena Bae, drummer/singer Myeong-jin Kim, and guitarist/singer Megan Nisbet . The band's name reflects their love of drinking, their youth-oriented fashion style, and their gender inclusiveness. The band is active in the LGBT Pride community in their mostly conservative home city. They cite the Japanese bands Hi-Standard, Dustbox, and Judy and Mary as influences, as well as the Korean bands Crying Nut, and ...Whatever That Means.

== History ==
Bae and Kim, who are both from Daegu, first met in 2007 through the Korean punk scene. In 2009 they formed the Seoul-based all-women punk band Chicken and Mayo ABC, but eventually returned to Daegu. Bae and Kim formed Drinking Boys and Girls Choir in 2013 with guitarist Bondu Seo. Inspired by the local 1990s-2000s punk scene in Daegu, the band resisted moving to Seoul and preferred to nurture a sustainable local scene. Their first release was the EP We Are in 2015.

The band went on hiatus in 2017 for Kim to recover from a serious motorcycle accident. They then reconvened and began touring internationally when able to take time off from their day jobs. During the first show of a tour of Indonesia in 2018, an audience member smoked marijuana and passed out, and the venue owner called the police thinking he was dead. The police locked the band and audience in the venue and lectured them on drug use. A later show on the tour was also shut down by the Indonesian police.

Drinking Boys and Girls Choir then recorded their first full-length album Keep Drinking, which was released by Damnably/Electric Muse in 2019. The band then embarked on an international tour, often supporting Damnably label mates Otoboke Beaver and Say Sue Me. Starting during this period, the band plays regularly at South Korean music festivals, with several appearances at the annual Zandari Festa. They traveled to the United States to appear at the 2019 SXSW festival.

Seo then retired from the band. After a brief European tour opening for Otoboke Beaver before the COVID-19 pandemic, this lineup recorded the album Marriage License which was titled after the process that must be followed for same-sex couples to receive recognition in South Korea. Marriage License was released in May 2021 and received favorable reviews from Spin and Paste, and was featured on radio programs by KEXP in the United States and CBC in Canada. Spin included Marriage License in its list of best punk albums of 2021, and Bandcamp listed it as one of their best albums of 2021.

After the COVID-19 pandemic, Drinking Boys and Girls Choir endeavored to develop a better local gig circuit in South Korea by organizing DIY tours with similar bands in Daegu, Seoul, and Busan. They also played at several international festivals during this period, and in 2021 contributed to the compilation album We, Do It Together which addressed misogyny in the South Korean indie scene.

Junghoon Han left the band in 2023. Bae and Kim then received a message from Scottish guitarist/singer Megan Nisbet, who was a fan of the band and could speak Korean. Nisbet volunteered to move to South Korea to join the band, and her offer was accepted. This lineup released the standalone single "History" in February 2024 and then embarked on an extensive North American tour opening for Otoboke Beaver.

== Members ==
Current

- Meena Bae - bass, vocals (2012–present)
- Taeyang Kim - guitar (2026)
- Minsoek Kang - Drums

Former

- Bondu Seo - guitar, vocals (2012–2019)
- So-yeon Park - guitar, vocals (2012-2015)
- Jung-hoon Han - guitar, vocals (2021–2023)
- Myeong-jin Kim - drums, vocals (2012–2026)
- Megan Nisbet - guitar, vocals (2023–2026)

== Discography ==
- 우리는, (We are,) (EP, 2015)
- Keep Drinking (2018)
- Marriage License (2021)
- Hey, Listen To Me (EP, 2023)
- DBGC Live in Busan (2024)
