= Moskva Surfing Club =

South Korean shoegaze band

- Origin: Seoul, South Korea
- Genres: Shoegaze; post-rock
- Years active: 2019-present
- Labels: Blue Tangerine Records
- Members: Jeong Kihoon; Jeong Hyeonjin; Myeong Jinwoo; Kim Kyuri

Moskva Surfing Club (Korean: 모스크바서핑클럽) is a South Korean shoegaze band. The band currently consists of Jeong Kihoon, Jeong Hyeonjin, Myeong Jinwoo and Kim Kyuri. Since their formation in 2019, the band has released two studio albums Low Flight (저공비행) (2021) and Foggy Sunshine (짙은햇살) (2023).

== Background ==
Moskva Surfing Club was formed in 2019 and was a trio at the time, but they turned into a four-member band in 2020. The band name comes from Surfing Coffee, a cafe that member Myeong Jinwoo saw when he travelled to Moscow. All 4 members are members of the same university club.

In 2021, the band released their first studio album Low Flight (저공비행), and in December, they released the single Anna O. They participated in the EBS Hello Rookie Contest. In 2023 they performed at the Pentaport Rock Festival, and they released their second studio album Foggy Sunshine (짙은햇살).

== Discography ==
=== Studio albums ===
- Low Flight (저공비행) (2021)
- Foggy Sunshine (짙은햇살) (2023)
