= Galaxy Express (band) =

South Korean rock band

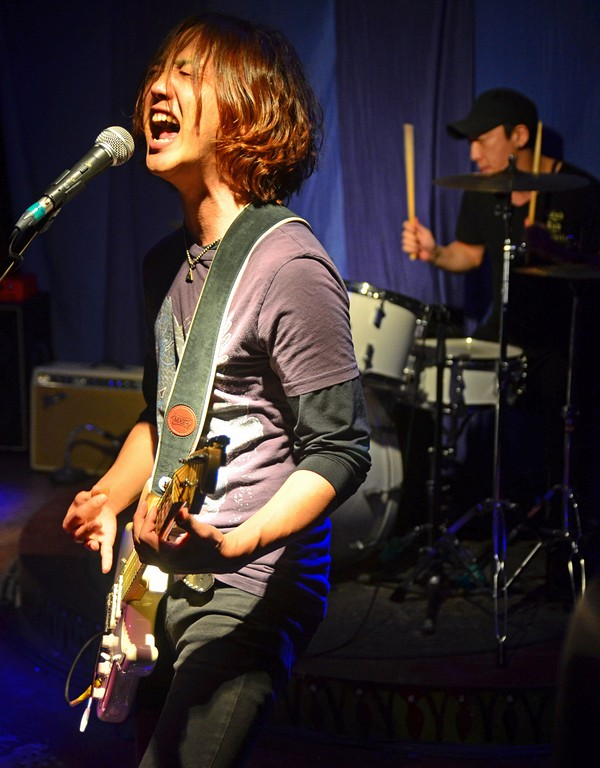
- Galaxy Express performed at Club Ta for the Steel Face compilation release.

Background information
- Origin: Seoul, South Korea
- Genres: Garage rock, punk rock, psychedelic rock
- Years active: 2006–present
- Label: Love Rock Company
- Members: Lee Ju-hyun; Park Jong-hyun; Jeon Yonghyeon
- Past members: Yoon Hong-gu; Kim Hee-kwon
- Website: http://galaxyexpress.co.kr/

Galaxy Express (Korean: 갤럭시 익스프레스) is a punk rock, garage rock band from South Korea that formed in 2006. The trio, which is known for its energetic stage presence, is one of the most popular rock bands in South Korea and has received international acclaim.

== Career ==
Galaxy Express was formed in 2005 and debuted in 2007 with the EP, To The Galaxy. In 2007, drummer Yoon Hong-gu suffered a hand injury, leading to the recruitment of Kim Hee-kwon, a percussionist with a background in classical music. Their first full-length album, 2008's Noise On Fire, won Best Rock Album at the 2009 Korean Music Awards.

To make their second full-length album, 2010's Wild Days, the band posted songs online and asked fans for feedback before recording final versions. The entire process of writing and recording the album took less than one month. This experiment helped Galaxy Express win the award for Musician of the Year at the 2011 Korean Music Awards.

In 2011, Galaxy Express took part in the Seoulsonic tour of North America, performing at major music festivals Canadian Music Week and South by Southwest, and at concerts in New York and Los Angeles. Their travels were documented in the 2012 documentary Turn It Up to 11, Part 2: Wild Days.

Galaxy Express returned to the Canadian Music Festival in 2012 and South by Southwest in 2012, 2013, and 2017. The band has also performed in France, Taiwan, and Hong Kong.

In 2013, band member Lee Ju-hyun was arrested in South Korea for marijuana possession, cultivation, and smoking. At the time, Galaxy Express was participating in the Mnet competition show Band Generation, and had advanced to the final round. While the band won the competition, Mnet did not air the final episode. Several days after Lee's arrest, band member Park Jong-hyun was investigated for smoking marijuana.

The band released their third album, Galaxy Express, in 2012 and their fourth album, Walking on Empty, in 2015. In 2018, Kim Hee-kwon left the band. In the first half of 2022, singer-songwriter and city pop musician Jeon Yonghyeon joined the band as the new drummer.

== Band members ==
- Lee Ju-hyun: bass, vocals
- Park Jong-hyun: guitar, vocals
- Jeon Yonghyeon: drums

== Discography ==
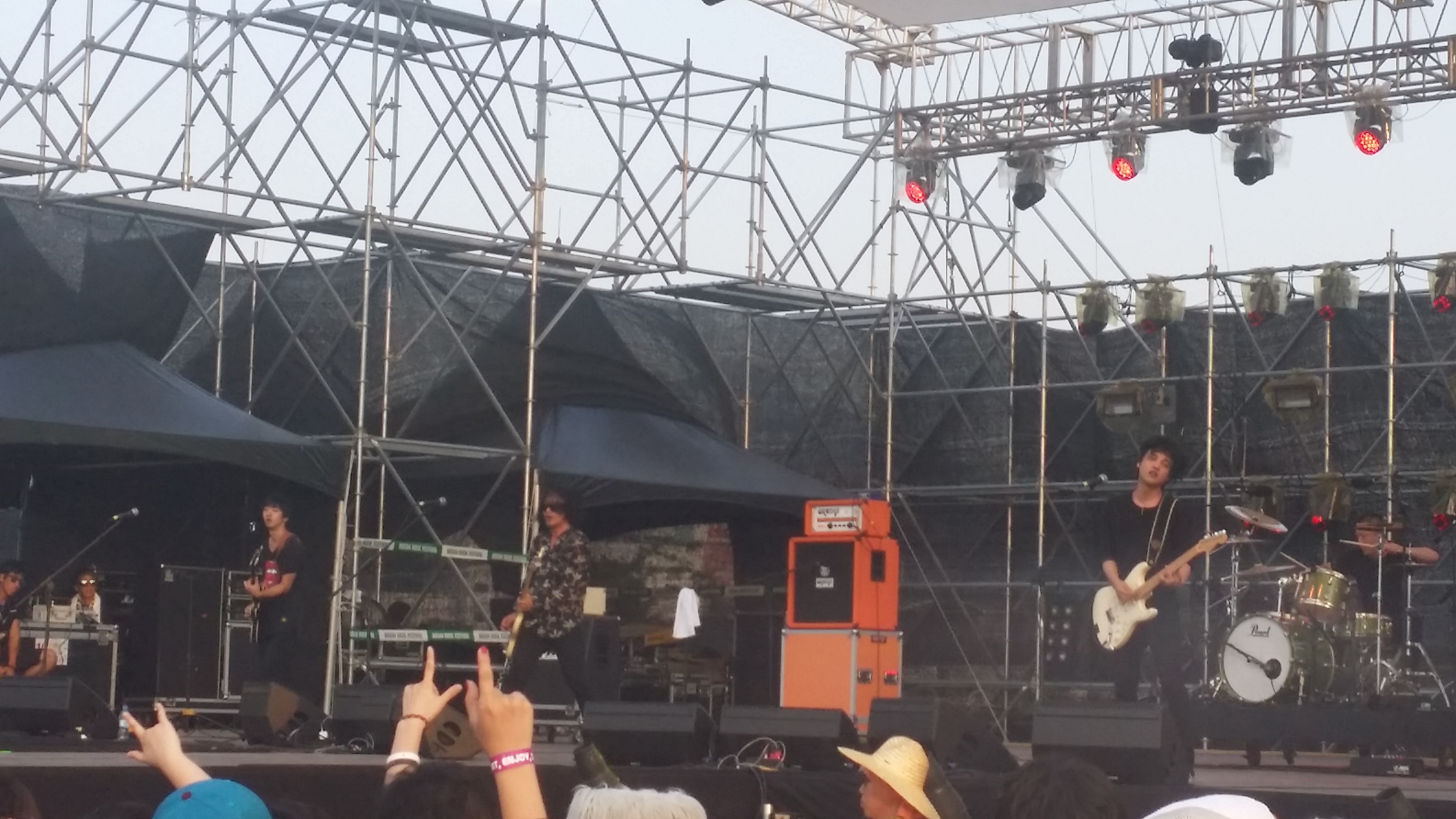
At the Busan Rock Festival in 2015.

=== Studio albums ===
- Noise on Fire (2008)
- Wild Days (2010)
- GALAXY EXPRESS (2012)
- Walking on Empty (2015)
- Electric Jungle (2018)
- Destroyer Black (2023)
- Wars Band (2025)

=== Singles, EP ===
- To the Galaxy (EP) (2007)
- Ramble Around (EP) (2007)
- Come On & Get Up! (EP) (2009)
- Naughty Boy split with Crying Nut (2011)
- Turn it up! (EP) (2020)
- DOWN (EP) (2020)
- Forget it (EP) (2020)
- LAIKA (EP) (2021)
- You Again EP (2021)
- The way (redux version) (EP) (2021)
- Don't Care Anymore (Single) (2023)
- Choose the Bad One (Single) (2023)

== Awards ==
=== Mnet KM Music Festival (MAMA Awards) ===
Year	Category	Recipient	Result
2008	Discovery of the Year	Galaxy Express	Won

=== Korean Music Awards ===
Year	Category	Recipient	Result
2009	Best Rock Album	Noise on Fire	Won
2011	Musician of the Year	Galaxy Express	Won
