= Soumbalgwang =

South Korean indie rock band

- Origin: Busan, South Korea
- Genres: Post-hardcore; post-punk; garage rock
- Years active: 2016–present
- Labels: Osoriworks
- Members: Kang Dong-soo; Kim Seong-been; Ma Jae-hyun; Park Seong-gyu
- Past members: Ahn Seong-hyun; Kim Ki-tae; Kim Bo-kyeong; Kim Ki-young

Soumbalgwang (Korean: 소음발광) is a South Korean post-hardcore band consisting of members Kang Dong-soo, Kim Seong-been, Ma Jae-hyun and Park Seong-gyu. Since their formation in 2016, the band has released their studio albums, Fuze (도화선) (2020) and Happiness, Flower (기쁨, 꽃) (2021) and Fire & Light (불과 빛) (2024).

== Career ==
Soumbalgwang was established in Busan in 2016 and there have been many member replacements since its formation. In 2019, they released an EP Huh (풋) inspired by the track name of the Onnine Ibalgwan's debut album Pigeon is a Rat in the Sky (비둘기는 하늘의 쥐), and they released its studio album, Fuze (도화선), in 2020.

Their second studio album, Happiness, Flower (기쁨, 꽃)was released in 2021. The album was produced by Kim Byung-kyu, a guitarist of Korean rock band Say Sue Me. In March 2022, they won the Best Rock Album and Best Rock Song at the Korean Music Awards.

== Discography ==
=== Studio albums ===
Title	Album details
Fuze (도화선; Dohwaseon)	Released: September 23, 2020; Label: Osoriworks; Format: Digital download, streaming, CD
Happiness, Flower (기쁨, 꽃; Gibbeum, Ggot)	Released: October 6, 2021; Label: Osoriworks; Format: Digital download, streaming, CD
Fire & Light (불과 빛; Bulgwabit)	Released: October 7, 2024; Label: Osoriworks; Format: Digital download, streaming, CD

=== EP ===
Title	Album details
Huh (풋; poot)	Released: March 4, 2019; Label: Osoriworks; Format: Digital download, streaming, CD

== Awards and nominations ==
Year	Award	Category	Nominated work	Result	Ref.
2022	Korean Music Awards	Best Rock Album	Happiness, Flower	Won	
2022	Korean Music Awards	Best Rock Song	Dance	Won	
2024	Korean Music Awards	Best Rock Album	Fire & Light		
