= Power Andre 99 =

2023 studio album by Silica Gel

Studio album by Silica Gel
- Released: 20 December 2023
- Genre: Indie rock; psychedelic rock; neo-psychedelia; art rock; indietronica; noise pop
- Length: 1:14:00
- Label: Magic Strawberry Sound

Silica Gel chronology
Silica Gel (2016)	Power Andre 99 (2023)

Singles from Power Andre 99
- 1. "Kyo181" Released: 23 August 2020; 2. "NO PAIN" Released: 25 August 2022; 3. "Mercurial" Released: 15 March 2023; 4. "Tik Tak Tok (feat. So!YoON!)" Released: 19 August 2023

Power Andre 99 (stylized as POWER ANDRE 99) is the second studio album by South Korean indie rock band Silica Gel. It was released on 20 December 2023. It is the first album since the band's 2018 hiatus, the first as a four-member group, and the first under the record label Magic Strawberry Sound. Power Andre 99 features 18 tracks, including a guest contribution from So!YoON! of the indie rock band Se So Neon.

== Release ==
On 23 August 2020, the band released the first single from the album, "Kyo181". The second single, "NO PAIN", was released on 25 August 2022. The same year, "NO PAIN" won at the 2022 Korean Music Awards for Best Modern Rock Song. On 15 March 2023, the band followed up with the third single "Mercurial".

The fourth single "Tik Tak Tok", featuring So!YoON!, was released on 19 August 2023.

=== Machine Boy EP ===
The singles "Mercurial" and "NO PAIN", along with unreleased singles "Budland", "T", "Realize" and "MachineboyGong", were compiled into the EP Machine Boy on 25 April 2023. "Tik Tak Tok" went on to win Best Modern Rock Song at the 2024 Korean Music Awards, and Machine Boy won Best Modern Rock Album the same night.

=== Concert film ===
In 2024, a concert film, also named Power Andre 99, documented a live performance of the album at the Blue Square Mastercard Hall in Yongsan. The film had its theatrical debut on June 26 across 29 CGV theaters and offered meet and greets between fans and the band members, along with promotional A3 posters for those who attended.

== Critical reception ==
Power Andre 99 picked up three nominations at the 2025 Korean Music Awards, for Album of the Year, Musician of the Year, and Best Modern Rock Album. KMA committee member Kim Du-wan stated "Silica Gel's second full-length album, released after a seven-year wait, is overwhelming from the process to the result", while Lee Su-jeong described "a sound that is different from existing bands, and this achievement is proven by the trophies they have already won at the Korean Popular Music Awards several times."

Seo Seongdeok of Weverse Magazine described Power Andre 99 as the band's "second chapter" coming to a close, as Silica Gel "let us know what sort of music they make as a band. In essence, we have here a band with members who talk about their individual hopes, rather than vague expectations of the future." Chris P of Korean Indie wrote how "Silica Gel's precise and specific rock foundation centers every song they create. The layers they play on each song changes and that's what maintains the optimal freshness level. Power Andre 99 is a new classic."

Annika Bjork of The Georgetown Independent stated the album "offers listeners a vibrant trip through our otherwise dull, mechanized, capitalist landscape", encouraging fans to listen to the album in order, "since innovative transitions pull listeners through the lush trip that is the album. The deeper you go, the more difficult it becomes to discern where one song stops and the next begins."

== Track listing ==
No.	Title	Length
1.	"On Black"	4:07
2.	"Eres Tu"	3:04
3.	"Juxtaposition"	4:12
4.	"Realize"	4:19
5.	"Gosan"	3:11
6.	"Andre99"	3:23
7.	"Babyface"	3:29
8.	"NO PAIN"	3:41
9.	"The Rim"	4:45
10.	"T"	1:04
11.	"Tik Tak Tok (featuring So!YoON!)"	6:15
12.	"Budland"	4:30
13.	"Ryudejakeiru"	4:09
14.	"APEX"	5:30
15.	"Ondine"	3:38
16.	"Mercurial"	3:31
17.	"MachineboyGong"	9:24
18.	"PH-1004"	1:57
