= Now (Se So Neon album) =

2025 studio album by Se So Neon

<NOW>

Studio album by Se So Neon
- Released: 15 August 2025
- Recorded: 2023–2024
- Genre: R&B; indie rock; k-pop; art rock
- Length: 44:05
- Language: Korean, English
- Label: AWAL
- Producer: Kenny Gilmore; Hwang So-yoon

Singles from Now
- 1. "Jayu" Released: 5 February 2021; 2. "Kidd" Released: 27 July 2023; 3. "Twit Winter" Released: 16 May 2025; 4. "Remember!" Released: 20 June 2025; 5. "New Romantic" Released: 18 July 2025

Now (stylized as <NOW>) is the debut studio album by South Korean indie rock band Se So Neon. It was released on 15 August 2025 through AWAL. Primarily recorded in Los Angeles and New York from 2023 to 2024, Now features 12 tracks produced by Hwang So-yoon, Jon Nellen, Kim Han-joo, Mike Bozzi and Kenny Gilmore.

In the years leading up to the release of Now, the band had gone through constant lineup changes ultimately resulting in Se So Neon becoming a 1-person project. In February 2025, after the departure of Park Hyun-jin, Hwang So-yoon was the only remaining member of the group, and had spent the past two years on hiatus working on a full-length release for Se So Neon.

Now was supported by 5 singles: "Jayu" and "Kidd", which were released before the album entered full-time production, are the only songs on Now that came out prior to the departures of Park and U-su. The remaining singles, "Twit Winter", "Remember!" and "New Romantic", were all released in early 2025 to promote the album.

== Background and release ==
In February 2021, Se So Neon released the single, "Jayu". At the time, the song was a non-album single, but it would become the only track on Now produced when the band had three members: Hwang So-yoon, Park Hyun-jin and U-su. Later, in 2023, after the departure of U-su, the single "Kidd" was released. "Kidd" was the final song released by Se So Neon as a multi-member project.

Hwang So-yoon, the band's only remaining member, focused on solo projects outside of Se So Neon in 2023. After the release of Episode 1: Love, Hwang "felt anxious" about Se So Neon's next steps and began recording for a potential debut album in New York, spending 10 hours a day in the studio. Additionally, songs were also recorded in California and South Korea, before Hwang eventually mastered the album in Los Angeles. Park Hyun-jin departed the band in February 2025, but was able to contribute to Now during recording.

On May 16, 2025, Se So Neon released their first single as a solo project featuring a music video self-directed by Hwang. The song, titled "Twit Winter", is co-produced by Hwang and Kenny Gilmore, and mixed by Nathan Boddy. On May 19, the band announced a North American tour that would take place later in that year to promote an upcoming album.

On June 19, Se So Neon released the second single "Remember!", inspired by the death of Hwang's close friend Ryuichi Sakamoto. The song, co-produced by Hwang and Jon Nellen, also featured a music video self-directed by Hwang. The same day, the band officially revealed the name and release date of Now.

On July 18, the third single "New Romantic" was released, alongside an English version of the song. Similarly, the band had previously included English versions for the singles "Twit Winter" and "Remember". The same day, the band announced they would be performing at the Yebisu Brewery's Garden Hall in Tokyo to promote the album's release, as well as appearing as headliners at the 2025 Setouchi Triennale music festival.

== Composition ==
The album features songs predominantly produced by Hwang So-yoon, Jon Nellen, and Kenny Gilmore. The tracks "Kidd", "Jayu" and "New Romantic" were co-written and co-produced by Kim Han-joo, the lead vocalist of Silica Gel.

== Track listing ==
Now track listing
No.	Title	Writer(s)	Producer(s)	Length
1.	"Twit Winter"	Hwang So-yoon; Kenny Gilmore	Hwang So-yoon; Kenny Gilmore	4:22
2.	"Remember"	Jake Sherman; Kirinji	Hwang So-yoon; Jon Nellen	3:31
3.	"New Romantic"	Hwang So-yoon; Jon Nellen; Kim Han-joo	Hwang So-yoon; Jon Nellen	2:57
4.	"Now"	Hwang So-yoon; Park Hyun-jin	Hwang So-yoon	4:14
5.	"Secret Police"	Hwang So-yoon; Jon Nellen; Jake Sherman		3:40
6.	"Small Heart"	Hwang So-yoon; Ludwig Persik	Hwang So-yoon; Ludwig Persik	4:14
7.	"Eden"	Hwang So-yoon		1:20
8.	"Jayu"	Hwang So-yoon; Park Hyun-jin; Kim Han-joo; Kim Donghyun	Hwang So-yoon; Kim Han-joo	3:52
9.	"Kidd"	Hwang So-yoon; Kim Han-joo	Hwang So-yoon; Kim Han-joo	3:47
10.	"3Revolution"	Hwang So-yoon; Park Hyun-jin; Kim Donghyun; Kim Doeon		4:59
11.	"p and q"	Hwang So-yoon; Vishal Nayak; Jon Nellen; Park Hyun-jin		3:14
12.	"O"	Hwang So-yoon; Kim Han-joo		3:55
