= 21st Korean Music Awards =

Music award ceremony

- Date: February 29, 2024
- Location: Seoul, South Korea

Highlights
- Most awards: Silica Gel; NewJeans (3)
- Most nominations: Beenzino; NewJeans; Silica Gel (5)
- Musician of the Year: Silica Gel
- Album of the Year: Beenzino – Nowitzki
- Song of the Year: NewJeans – "Ditto"
- Website: koreanmusicawards.com

The 21st Korean Music Awards was held in Seoul, South Korea on February 29, 2024. Hosted by the Korean Music Awards Selection Committee and sponsored by the Ministry of Culture, Sports and Tourism and the Korea Creative Content Agency, the ceremony recognized the best music released in South Korea between December 1, 2022, and November 30, 2023.

Unlike other South Korean music awards, the Korean Music Awards are based on musical achievement rather than record sales. Winners are determined by the Korean Music Awards Selection Committee panel comprising music critics, radio show producers, academics, and other music industry professionals.

Nominations were announced on January 26, 2024. Girl group NewJeans, rapper Beenzino, and rock band Silica Gel received the most nominations with five. With three, NewJeans and Silica Gel won the most awards.

== Winners and nominees ==
=== Main awards ===
Winners are listed first, highlighted in boldface, and indicated with a double dagger (‡). Nominees are listed in alphabetical order.

**Album of the Year**: **Beenzino – Nowitzki**‡; Lee Jin-ah – Hearts of the City; NewJeans – Get Up; Silica Gel – Machine Boy; Yeoyu and Solbin – Comedy	**Song of the Year**: **NewJeans – "Ditto"**‡; Beenzino – "Travel Again" (featuring Cautious Clay); H1-Key – "Rose Blossom"; Jung Kook – "Seven" (feat Latto); Silica Gel – "Tik Tak Tok" (featuring So!YoON!)
**Musician of the Year**: **Silica Gel**‡; Beenzino; Carina Nebula; Jung Kook; NewJeans; Wave to Earth	**Rookie of the Year**: **Kiss of Life**‡; Dongyi; H1-Key; Hanel; Mihyang Moon; NO.LINK
**Best K-Pop Album**: **NewJeans – Get Up**‡; Billlie – The Billage of Perception: Chapter Three; Jung Kook – Golden; Kiss of Life – Born to Be XX; Tomorrow X Together – The Name Chapter: Freefall	**Best K-Pop Song**: **NewJeans – "Ditto"**‡; Fifty Fifty – "Cupid"; H1-Key – "Rose Blossom"; Ive – "I Am"; Jung Kook – "Seven" (feat Latto)
**Best Pop Album**: **Lee Jin-ah – Hearts of the City**‡; Cacophony – DIPUC; Kim Se-jeong – Door; Kim Su-young - Round and Round; Parc Jae-jung – Alone; Yoon Ji-young – In My Garden	**Best Pop Song**: **AKMU – "Love Lee"**‡; Dean – "Die 4 You"; Parc Jae-jung – "Let's Say Goodbye"; Yoon Ji-young – "In My Garden"; Yoon Seok-cheol & Sejin – "Cocktail Paradise"
**Best Rock Album**: **OVerdrive Philosophy – 64 see me**‡; Bongjeingan – 12 Languages; Ohchill – The Burning City; Thornapple – Animal; Touched – Yellow Supernova Remnant; Zeonpasangsa – Second Quarter Results	**Best Rock Song**: **Seoul Electronic Band – Ghost Writers**‡; Gate Flowers – "All In"; Ohchill – "Something's Wrong"; OVerdrive Philosophy – "Soju & Soul"; Zeonpasangsa – "I'm Blues Man"
**Best Modern Rock Album**: **Silica Gel – Machine Boy**‡; Dabda – Yonder; Jungwoo – Cloud Cuckoo Land; Parannoul – After the Magic; Wave to Earth – 0.1 Flaws and All	**Best Modern Rock Song**: **Silica Gel – "Tik Tak Tok" (featuring So!YoON!)**; Cho Yong-pil – "Feeling of You"; Dabda – "Flower Tail"; Jungwoo – "Cloud Cuckoo Land"; Verycoybunny – "Now or Never"
**Best Electronic Album**: **Yetsuby – My Star My Planet My Earth**‡; Cifika – ION; Hypnosis Therapy – Psilocybin; No. Link – Move That; Otot – 21st Century Electronic Duo	**Best Electronic Song**: **Cifika – "Hush"**‡; Guinneissik – "Farewell Two Shell"; Hypnosis Therapy – "JONGNO"; Kirara – "Numbers"; Mount XLR – "Acid Wasp"
**Best Rap & Hip-Hop Album**: **Beenzino – Nowitzki**‡; Kid Milli – Beige; Lonbonabeat! – Trapstar Lifestyle; O'Domar – Propaganda X; Skyminhyuk – Liberation	**Best Rap & Hip-Hop Song**: **E Sens – "What the Hell"**‡; Beenzino – "Travel Again" (featuring Cautious Clay); Lobonabeat! – "Young Boy" (feat. Oygli); Kid Milli – "25" (feat. Yang Hong-won); Skyminhyuk – "14-23"
**Best R&B & Soul Album**: **Jerd – Bomm**‡; BRWN – Yours Truly; Crush – Wondergo; Hoody – Sailing; Youra – (1)	**Best R&B & Soul Song**: **Youra – "Motif"**‡; Jerd – "Closed" (feat. Jjangyou); Soul Delivery – "Whiskey" (with Sole and Thama); Sumin – "Closet" (feat. Uhm Jung-hwa); Thama – "Bump It Up"
**Best Folk Album**: **Yeoyu and Solbin – Comedy**‡; Heo Jeong-hyuk – Bud Days; Hwang Pu-ha – Two Faces; Jeong Mil-ah – Riverside; Lee Hyung-ju – To Cherish; Lee Min-hwi – Hometown to Come	**Best Folk Song**: **Yeoyu and Seolbin – "Like the Stars in the Night Sky"**‡; Hwang Pu-ha – "Fire"; Hwang Pu-ha – "Inept"; Jeong Mil-ah – "Describe"; Lee Min-hwi – "Hometown to Come"
**Best Jazz Instrumental Album**: **Soojung Lee – Four Seasons**‡; Heo Daeuk – Will It Be Spring Tomorrow?; Jung Su-min – Intrinsic Nature; Lim Mi-jung – Flow; Song Nam-hyun – The Verdant Hill	**Best Jazz Vocal Album**: **Kim Yu-jin – Extraordinary**‡; Carina Nebula – Good Match; Moon Mi-hyang – I Wished On the Moon; Sunny Kim, Vardan Ovsepian & Ben Monder – Liminal Silence; Vardan Ovsepian and Song Yi-jeon – Lawless Heart
**Best Metal & Hardcore Album**: **Mahatma – Reason for Silence**‡; Doguul – If These Bodies Could Talk; Hollow Jan – Confusion; Noeazy – Behind the Mask	**Best Global Contemporary Album**: **Dongyi – a method for capsaicinoid analysis**‡; Ensemble Sinawi – Cosmos; Hanel – Vals del Sí; Iseul Kim's Two Voices – Evolving

=== Special awards ===
- Lifetime Achievement Award – Kang Tae-hwan
