= Here to Stay =

Here to Stay may refer to:

- Here to Stay (Freddie Hubbard album)
- Here to Stay (Schon & Hammer album)
- Here to Stay (Greg Sczebel album)
- Here to Stay (The Slickee Boys album)
- Here to Stay (TRPP album)
- "Here to Stay", song by Pat Metheny Group from the 1995 album We Live Here
- "Here to Stay" (Korn song), 2002
- "Here to Stay" (Christina Aguilera song)
- "Here to Stay" (New Order song), 2002
- Here to Stay (Deuteronomium album), an album by the band Deuteronomium
- "Here to Stay", a 2020 song by Meghan Trainor from Treat Myself
- Here to Stay (TV series), a Canadian dramatic television anthology miniseries
