= Tik Tak Tok =

Single by Silica Gel

from the album Power Andre 99
- Language: Korean
- B-side: "T"
- Released: August 19, 2023
- Genre: Indie rock
- Length: 6:15
- Label: Magic Strawberry Sound; Sony Music Publishing Korea; Kakao Entertainment
- Songwriter(s): Choi Woong-hee; Hwang So-yoon; Kim Geon-jae; Kim Han-joo; Kim Min-su

Silica Gel singles chronology
"Mercurial" (2023)	"Tik Tak Tok" (2023)	"S G T A P E - 02" (2024)

Music video
- "T + Tik Tak Tok (feat. So!YoON!)" on YouTube

"Tik Tak Tok" (Korean: 틱택톡) is a song by South Korean indie rock band Silica Gel from their second studio album, Power Andre 99 (2023). The song was written by band members Choi Woong-hee, Kim Geon-jae, Kim Han-joo, and Kim Min-su alongside Se So Neon vocalist Hwang So-yoon, who features on the track as a guest collaborator under her stage name So!YoON!. The single was released on 19 August, 2023 by Magic Strawberry Sound, Kakao Entertainment and Sony Music Publishing Korea alongside the B-side track "T".

== Background ==
On August 5, 2023, the song was previewed during Silica Gel's appearance at the 2023 Pentaport Rock Festival, and received a positive response from fans. Magic Strawberry Sound described it as "a song that is perfect for a summer festival" and a "new and brave sound".

== Reception ==
"Tik Tak Tok"
A sample of the song's 4-minute long guitar solo that was praised by critics, performed by lead guitarist Kim Chun-chu.

Upon release, "Tik Tak Tok" received positive reviews from Korean music critics, who praised So!YoON!'s appearance, the production and 4-minute long guitar solo. KMA Selection Committee member Bae Soon-tak pointed out the dynamic synthesizer riff at the beginning of the song, calling it "promise and proof that this is the Silica Gel sound" and praised the "unforgettable and powerful guitar solo", labelling "Tik Tak Tok" as "the rock of 2023."

In March 2023, "Tik Tak Tok" was nominated for Song of the Year at the 21st Korean Music Awards and won Best Modern Rock Song, with Hong Jeong-taek calling it "a work that pours out the band's accumulated performance skills, ideas and energy in a dense development. From the hooking riff, the vocal line that accurately recognizes the timing of the ending and stab, to the guitar solo that runs wild for half the song. This song competes to reveal almost all the elements that make up the band in its most intense form."

In December 2023, "Tik Tak Tok" won the award for Best Music Style at the Melon Music Awards.

== Charts and awards ==
Chart performance for "Tik Tak Tok"
Chart (2023)	Peak position
South Korea (Melon Hot 100)	37
South Korea (Melon Latest Release)	11

Awards and nominations

Award	Year	Category	Nominee / Nominated work	Result	Ref.
Korean Music Awards	2024	Best Modern Rock Song	"Tik Tak Tok" (featuring So!YoON!)	Won	
Korean Music Awards	2024	Song of the Year	"Tik Tak Tok" (featuring So!YoON!)	Nominated	
Melon Music Awards	2023	Best Music Style	"Tik Tak Tok" (featuring So!YoON!)	Won	
