= 20th Korean Music Awards =

2023 South Korean music awards ceremony

- Date: March 5, 2023
- Location: Seoul, South Korea

Highlights
- Most awards: 250 (4)
- Most nominations: NewJeans (6)
- Musician of the Year: 250
- Album of the Year: 250 – Ppong
- Song of the Year: Younha – "Event Horizon"
- Website: koreanmusicawards.com

The 20th Korean Music Awards was held in Seoul, South Korea on March 5, 2023. Hosted by the Korean Music Awards Selection Committee and sponsored by the Ministry of Culture, Sports and Tourism and the Korea Creative Content Agency, the ceremony recognized the best music released in South Korea between December 1, 2021, and November 30, 2022.

Unlike other South Korean music awards, the Korean Music Awards are based on musical achievement rather than record sales. Winners are determined by the Korean Music Awards Selection Committee panel comprising music critics, radio show producers, academics, and other music industry professionals.

Nominations were announced on February 9, 2023. Newcomer girl group NewJeans received the most nominations with six, including in all three daesang categories. Producer 250 won the most awards of the night with four, while NewJeans won a total of three awards; 250 also served as the producer for the works NewJeans were nominated for.

== Winners and nominees ==
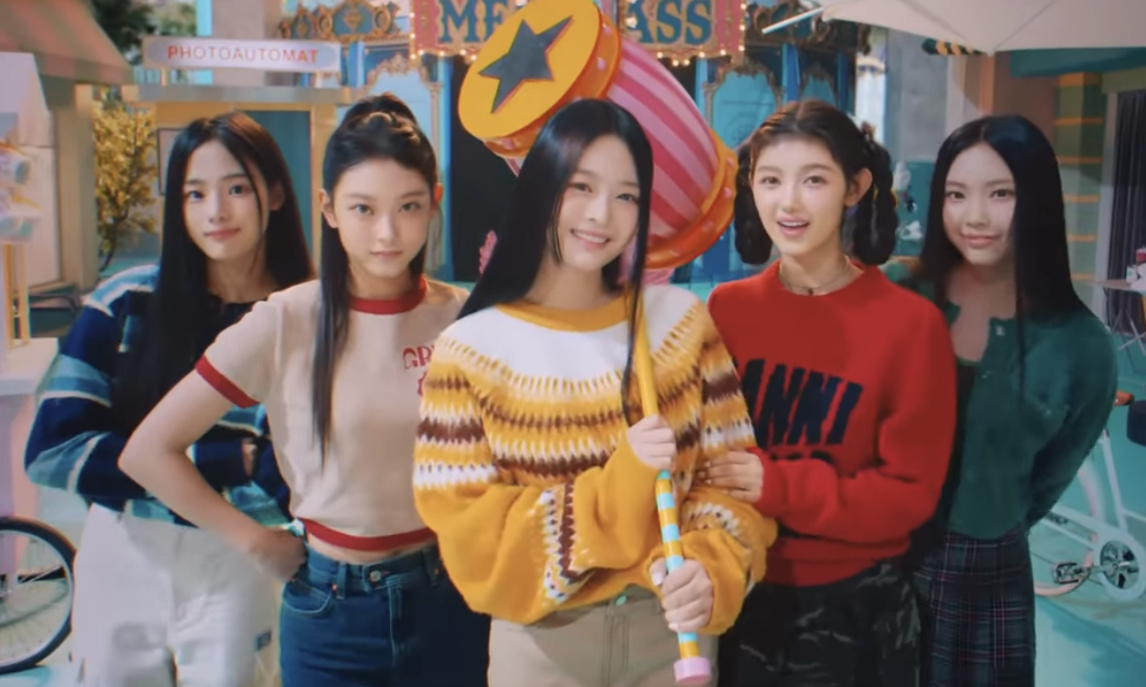
NewJeans is the ceremony's most nominated artist

=== Main awards ===
Winners are listed first, highlighted in boldface, and indicated with a double dagger (‡). Nominees are listed in alphabetical order.

**Album of the Year**: **250 – Ppong**‡; The Black Skirts – Teen Troubles; Line and Circle – Night and Day; NewJeans – New Jeans; Nucksal, Cadejo – Sincerely Yours; Song Young-joo – Atmosphere	**Song of the Year**: **Younha – "Event Horizon"**‡; (G)I-dle – "Tomboy"; Ive – "Love Dive"; Jang Ki-ha – "Envy None"; NewJeans – "Attention"; Silica Gel – "No Pain"
**Musician of the Year**: **250**‡; Jang Ki-ha; NewJeans; Nucksal, Cadejo; Younha	**Rookie of the Year**: **NewJeans**‡; Hanroro; Ive; Le Sserafim; Kim Yu-jin; Sion
**Best K-Pop Album**: **NewJeans – New Jeans**‡; (G)I-dle – I Love; (G)I-dle – I Never Die; Le Sserafim – Antifragile; Taeyeon – INVU	**Best K-Pop Song**: **NewJeans – "Attention"**‡; (G)I-dle – "Tomboy"; Ive – "Love Dive"; Le Sserafim – "Antifragile"; Red Velvet – "Feel My Rhythm"
**Best Pop Album**: **Lee Chan-hyuk – Error**‡; Choi Beck-ho – Moment; Jang Ki-ha – Levitation; Light & Salt – Here We Go; Lim Young-woong – Im Hero	**Best Pop Song**: **Younha – "Event Horizon"**‡; 250 – "It Was All a Dream"; Jang Ki-ha – "Envy None"; Lee Chan-hyuk – "Panorama"; Wonpil – "A Journey"
**Best Rock Album**: **Concorde – Supersonic Airliner**‡; ABTB – iii; BadLamb – Universal Anxiety; Lanalogue – Stereo Out!; OVerdrive Philosophy – OVerdrive Philosophy	**Best Rock Song**: **Jambinai – "From the Place Been Erased" (feat. Sunwoo Jung-a)**‡; BadLamb – "Love, Lies, Bleeding"; Concorde – "Rainbow Flowers Are Blooming"; HarryBigButton – "Thelma & Louise"; OVerdrive Philosophy – "Painful Truth"
**Best Modern Rock Album**: **The Black Skirts – Teen Troubles**‡; The Bowls – Blast From the Past; Huckleberryfinn – The Light of Rain; Say Sue Me – The Last Thing Left; TRPP – Here to Stay	**Best Modern Rock Song**: **Silica Gel – "No Pain"**‡; Cho Yong-pil – "Moment"; Hanroro – "Let Me Love My Youth"; Huckleberryfinn – "Tempest"; Say Sue Me – "To Dream"
**Best Electronic Album**: **250 – Ppong**‡; Glen Check – Bleach; Pierre Blanche – Ego; Salamanda – Ashbalkum; Two Tone Shape – Every Minute	**Best Electronic Song**: **250 – "Bang Bus"**‡; Glen Check – "4ever"; Kirara – "Stargaze"; Pierre Blanche – "Infinite Circle" (feat. Rondo Mo); Taeyeon – "INVU" (Moon Kyoo Remix)
**Best Rap & Hip-Hop Album**: **Nucksal, Cadejo – Sincerely Yours**‡; C Jamm – Ghenn; Lee Hyun-jun – Lost in Translation; Paloalto – Dirt; Qim Isle – Some Hearts Are for Two	**Best Rap & Hip-Hop Song**: **Nucksal, Cadejo – "Good Morning Seoul"**‡; Lee Hyun-jun – "White Lighter"; Lobonabeat! – "Birthday" (feat. Bill Stax); Paloalto – "Priceless" (feat. toigo); Zico – "New Thing" (prod. by Zico, feat. Homies)
**Best R&B & Soul Album**: **A.Train – Private Pink**‡; Che – Kpop; Joe Layne – Life O Life; Rad Museum – Rad; Slom – Weather Report; Soul Delivery – FoodCourt	**Best R&B & Soul Song**: **Bibi – "Jotto"**‡; A.Train – "Something Beautiful" (feat. Meaningful Stone, Simun, Seo Bo-kyung); Sion – "Braindead"; Slom – "Anirago" (feat. Zion.T); Soul Delivery – "Nugs" (with Thama)
**Best Folk Album**: **Line and Circle – Night and Day**‡; Bae Young-gyoung – You My Blue; Kim Mok-in – Stored Images; Lucid Fall – Voice Beside Guitar; Summer of Thoughts – Hands	**Best Folk Song**: **Line and Circle – "Night and Day"**‡; Bae Young-gyoung – "I Love You" (feat. Sunnie); Kim Mok-in – "Walking in the City" (feat. Dajung); Lucid Fall – "A Small Handful of Songs"; Summer of Thoughts – "Rambler" (with Park Hye-li)
**Best Jazz Album**: **Song Young-joo – Atmosphere**‡; Hoo Kim Big Band – Common Heritage of Humankind; Kim Jung-sik – Hangul, Improvisation; Mandong – Big Sun; Yu Tae-sung – Michelangelo	**Best Jazz Vocal Album**: **Kim Yu-jin – A Piece and the Whole**‡; Kim Ju-hwan – Candy: Memories of Nat King Cole Trio; Maria Kim – Stellive Vol. 16 Two for the Road; Song Yi-jeon & Vinicius Gomes – Home; Youn Sun-nah – Waking World
**Best Metal & Hardcore Album**: **Madmans Esprit – I See Myself Through You Who See Us Through Me**‡; Dog Last Page – Drunken Dream; Nuclear Idiots – Nclridts; Seaweed Mustache – Bombora"; Visceral Explosion – Human Meat Distribution Process	**Best Global Contemporary Album**: **Jung Jae-il – Psalms**‡; Baum Sae – Communication; Hwang Gina – Short Film; Ji Park, BlankFor.ms, VRI String Quartet – Syntropy; Park Jiha – The Gleam; Sinnoi – Illumination

=== Special awards ===
- Achievement Award – Love & Peace
