= Smoke Sprite =

Single by So!YoON! featuring RM

from the album Episode 1: Love
- Language: English
- Released: March 14, 2023
- Genre: Indie rock
- Length: 4:02
- Label: Magic Strawberry Sound
- Songwriters: Hwang So-yoon; RM; Chae Lin Suh
- Composers: Te Rim; Chi Yoon-hae; Hwang So-yoon; RM
- Producer: Hwang So-yoon

So!YoON! singles chronology
| "Bad" (2023) | "Smoke Sprite" (2023) |

RM singles chronology
| "Wild Flower" (2022) | "Sprite Smoke" (2022) | "Don't Ever Say Love Me" (2023) |

Music video
- "'Smoke Sprite' (feat. RM of BTS) Official MV" on YouTube

"Smoke Sprite" is a song by South Korean musician So!YoON! from her second studio album, Episode 1: Love (2023). The song was written by Hwang, Chae Lin Suh and RM of BTS who features on the track as a guest collaborator. The single was released on March 14, 2023 by Magic Strawberry Sound with an accompanying music video to promote the release of the album.

== Background ==
In the summer of 2022, Hwang and RM were working on their individual albums when they met by chance in a recording studio. While sharing their work with each other, Hwang showed RM an early demo of the "Smoke Sprite" instrumental, leading the pair to collaborate on developing the song. On the first day of writing the lyrics, RM kneeled down in front of Hwang while suggesting the chorus line "Take on my knees".

On March 9, 2023, Hwang released a teaser video for the single which revealed a 10-second snippet of the chorus, along with a variety of shots from the upcoming music video.

The music video for "Smoke Sprite" portrays Hwang in a series of surreal scenarios, such as floating in a pool of water, running through snowy mountains with a sunburn, and shooting herself with a bow.

== Reception ==
Upon release, "Smoke Sprite" received positive reviews from music critics, with Mary Siroky of Consequence describing the song as "effortlessly cool".

The Bias List gave it a rating of 8/10, calling it a "much more alternative sound than the glossy K-pop surrounding it". Dr. Colette Balmain of View of the Arts gave "Smoke Sprite" a rating of 4.5/5, discussing the "visual and lyrical eroticism" of the song, and comparing Hwang's use of personas in the music video to Cindy Sherman's Untitled Film Stills.

== Chart performance ==
Chart performance for "Smoke Sprite"
| Chart (2023) | Peak position |
|---|---|
| Hungary (HUN) | 39 |
| Japan (JPN Dig) | 36 |
| United Kingdom (UK Down) | 15 |
| United States (US Dig) | 9 |
