= Silica Gel (album) =

Studio album by Silica Gel
- Released: 12 October 2016
- Genres: Indie rock, psychedelic rock
- Length: 50:03
- Label: BGBG Records

Silica Gel chronology
| Silica Gel (2016) | Power Andre 99 (2023) |

Silica Gel (Korean: 실리카겔) is the debut studio album by South Korean indie rock band Silica Gel. The album was released on 12 October 2016.

== Background ==
The band released their EP Pure Sun (새삼스레 들이켜본 무중력 사슴의 다섯 가지 시각) in August 2015. They signed with the label after sending their demo to BGBG Records, and began recording their first studio album.

== Critical reception ==
Professional ratings
Review scores
| Source | Rating |
|---|---|
| IZM | 3/5 stars |

Kang Minjeong of IZM described Silica Gel as "extremely present, fierce [and] the birth of a band full of youth". Selection committee member for the Korean Music Awards Choi Jiho labeled the album as "the world of plastic lyricism of synth-pop in the 80s and capitalist freaks created by post-punk. It is deeply rooted in the tradition of the genre. Somewhere between this tradition and the tension of injustice, this album exists". That night, the band won Rookie of the Year.

== Track listing ==
| No. | Title | Length |
|---|---|---|
| 1. | "Visus" ("비경") | 3:26 |
| 2. | "Pupilla" ("눈동자") | 4:20 |
| 3. | "9" | 4:05 |
| 4. | "Creek" ("강") | 2:52 |
| 5. | "Everybody Does" ("모두 그래") | 4:54 |
| 6. | "Orange" | 4:35 |
| 7. | "Lover" ("연인") | 3:36 |
| 8. | "Hrm" | 5:42 |
| 9. | "Sister" | 5:21 |
| 10. | "Woong's Theme" | 2:34 |
| 11. | "Intro (for Memory)" ("Intro (for 기억)") | 1:43 |
| 12. | "Memory" ("기억") | 6:55 |
