= Cho Ju-bin =

South Korean criminal (born 1995)

- 조주빈
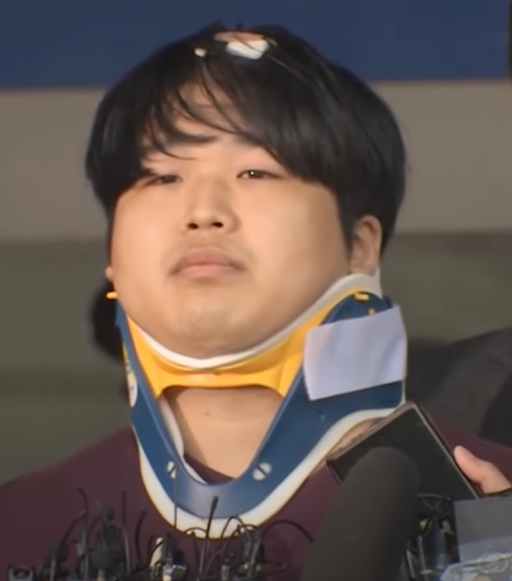
- Cho in 2020
- Born: 14 October 1995 (age 31); Incheon, South Korea
- Education: Inha Technical College
- Known for: Nth room case

Cho Ju-bin (Korean: 조주빈; born 14 October 1995) is a South Korean criminal who was convicted of blackmail and sexual harassment as part of the "Nth Room" case. He previously used the username "Baksa".

== Biography ==
Born in 1995, Cho studied Information and Communications at Inha Technical College.

== Implication in Nth room case ==
In early 2020, the Nth room case garnered national attention in South Korea. On March 23, the Seoul Broadcasting System revealed the personal information of the suspect, Cho, after conducting its own investigation. The next day, police also confirmed his identity.

Cho was widely accused of sexual harassment, with some of the victims being minors, including secondary school students. It was also reported that he threatened Sohn Suk-hee, a former news anchor.

In an interview on March 25, Cho seemingly thanked law enforcement for their investigation by saying "Thank you for putting the brakes on the life of a devil that could not be stopped."

== Sentence ==
On November 26, 2020, Cho was found guilty of his crimes and sentenced to forty years in prison, with an additional five years were added in February 2021 for 'concealing criminal proceeds'. He reportedly said he wanted to apologize to his victims, whilst the courts claimed that based on his statements, such as those in his blog, that Cho was not truly remorseful for his crimes. Whilst appealing the court's decision Cho created a blog on Naver which contained six articles, including denunciation of the South Korean judicial system and his reasons for appeal. The blog was subsequently shut down by Naver, who responded publicly, saying, "After receiving a number of reports about Cho's blog, we have decided to shut down the site due to its violations of our operating policy."

Cho is being held at Seoul Detention Center in Gyeonggi Province.
