= Wave to Earth =

South Korean indie rock band

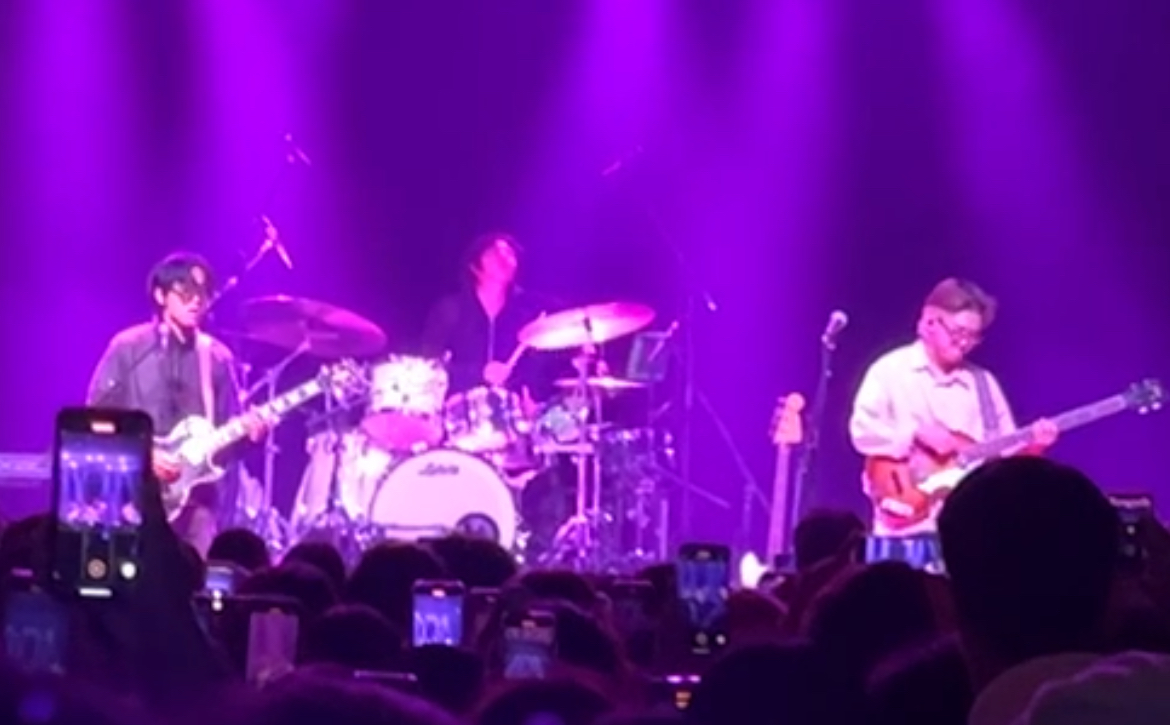
- Wave to Earth in 2023

Background information
- Origin: Seoul, South Korea
- Genres: Indie rock; Soft rock; Jazz-pop
- Years active: 2019–present
- Label: WAVY
- Members: Daniel Kim; Dong Q; John Cha
- Website: wave-to-earth.com

Wave to Earth (Korean: 웨이브투어스; stylized in all lowercase) is a South Korean indie rock band that consists of lead vocalist and guitarist Daniel Kim, drummer Dong Q, and bassist John Cha. Since their formation in 2019, they have released one studio album, 0.1 Flaws and All. in 2023 and their third extended play Play with Earth! 0.03 in 2024.

== Name ==
The band's name, Wave to Earth, originated from the art collective "we are not 0.00", also known as "we are not yeong", which was co-founded by vocalist and guitarist Daniel Kim and a friend who later became responsible for the band's album artwork and music videos. As the band was initially established as part of the collective, the members wanted to incorporate the letters "we" from its name into the band's identity. The name was further inspired by an experience in which Kim saw a large ocean wave, leaving a strong impression on him. He envisioned the band as contributing a new and distinctive wave to the Korean music industry, which inspired the band to adopt its name.

== History ==
Wave to Earth was formed when Daniel Kim and Dong Q were in middle school. They said they formed a band with the ambition of "showing music that makes a new wave." They debuted with the single "Wave" on August 23, 2019, with a new member John Cha. While the three of them are the official members, other regular partners of the band include member Jeon Min (saxophone), and Hong Seungki, in charge of the band's artwork. The band's unique sound, blending soft indie rock with jazz influences, has garnered an international fanbase, particularly through streaming platforms, marking them as a standout in South Korea's indie scene. They released two EPs in January 2020: Wave 0.01 and Summer flows 0.02. They signed with WAVY, the label where Colde is the owner, in 2021. They had a live performance with La Poem on Naver Onstage. In 2023, they released their first studio album, 0.1 Flaws and All. Following the release of 0.1 Flaws and All., the band released a documentary on the process of creating their new album on their YouTube channel. The band did a studio lock-in and completely lived with each other while creating the album, having fun during the day and working through the night. Daniel describes the memories as fun, fulfilling and challenging. Daniel Kim described the album's A-side as centered on love and happiness, not romantic love, but affection for his band-mates, friends, and family, and an appreciation of the time spent with them. The B side takes a darker twist on love, taking on themes of heartbreak and desire. They were included in the lineup of South Korean rock festivals, including the Seoul Jazz Festival and Pentaport Rock Festival, and The Other Festival in Indonesia. Wave to Earth completed a sold-out North American tour in September 2023. On September 6, 2024, they released their studio album entitled Play with Earth! 0.03. On August 6th 2026, the band released their latest album, bad pieces.

== Band members ==
- Daniel Kim – lead vocals, guitars (2019–present)
- John Cha – bass guitar (2019–present)
- Dong Q – drums, percussion (2019–present)

=== Session and touring members ===
- Jeon Min – saxophone
- Ban Si-on – keyboards
- Hong Seungki – artwork

== Artistry ==
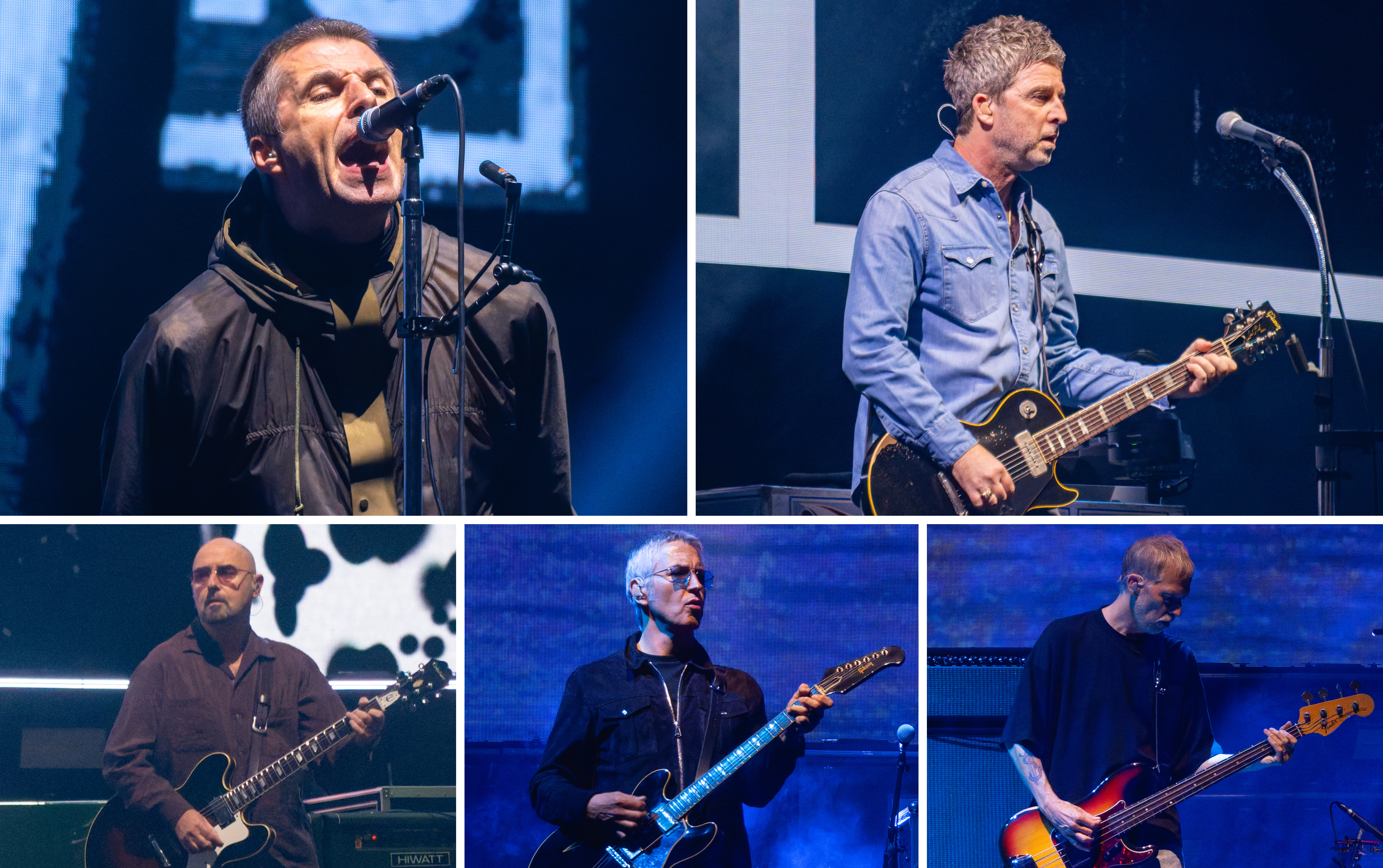
Wave to earth's major influences include oasis (left) and Sunset Rollercoaster (right).

The band's musical identity is rooted in the artists who first inspired its members to pursue music. Lead vocalist and guitarist Daniel Kim credits musicians like Radiohead, Oasis, Jeff Buckley, Ryan Beatty, Unknown Mortal Orchestra, Oscar Jerome, Ellegarden, and King Krule as the artists who sparked his passion for creating music and influences. Drummer Dong Q points to Oasis, along with Sunset Rollercoaster, and bassist John Cha cited artists such as Tame Impala, Boy Pablo, Vacations, Prince, Bon Iver, and Benny Sings. Additionally, Daniel Kim has cited Sunset Rollercoaster as a core blueprint for the band's trajectory and musical framework.

== Discography ==
=== Studio albums ===
Title	Album details	Peak chart positions	Sales
Title	Album details	KOR	Sales
0.1 Flaws and All.	Released: 20 April 2023; Label: Wavy; Formats: CD, LP, digital download	20	KOR: 14,057
Bad Pieces	Released: 7 August 2026; Label: Wavy; Formats: CD, digital download	45	KOR: 4,572

=== Compilation albums ===
Title	Album details	Peak chart positions	Sales
Title	Album details	KOR	Sales
Uncounted 0.00	Released: 14 May 2024 (limited); Label: Wavy; Formats: LP	16	KOR: 9,077

=== EPs ===
Title	EP details	Peak chart positions	Sales
Title	EP details	KOR	Sales
Wave 0.01	Released: 2 January 2020; Label: We Are Not 0.00; Formats: CD, digital download	55	KOR: 4,166
Summer Flows 0.02	Released: 4 August 2020; Label: We Are Not 0.00; Formats: CD, digital download	53	KOR: 4,026
Play with Earth! 0.03	Released: 6 September 2024; Label: Wavy; Formats: CD, LP, digital download, streaming	17	KOR: 10,570

=== Singles ===
- "Wave" (2019)
- "Light" (2019)
- "Surf." (2020)
- "Pueblo" (2020)
- "Daisy" (2021)
- "Noelle Vague" (2021)
- "Calla" (2022)
- "Dried Flower" (2022)
- "Heaven and Hell" (2026)
- "Courage" (2026)

== Awards and nominations ==
Name of the award ceremony, year presented, category, nominee of the award, and the result of the nomination
Award ceremony	Year	Category	Nominee / Work	Result	Ref.
Korean Music Awards	2024	Musician of the Year	Wave to Earth	Nominated	
Korean Music Awards	2024	Best Modern Rock Album	0.1 Flaws and All.	Nominated	
Korean Music Awards	2025	Best Modern Rock Song	"Annie."	Nominated	
Seoul Music Awards	2025	Band Award	Wave to Earth	Won	
