= Hwang So-yoon =

South Korean singer and guitarist

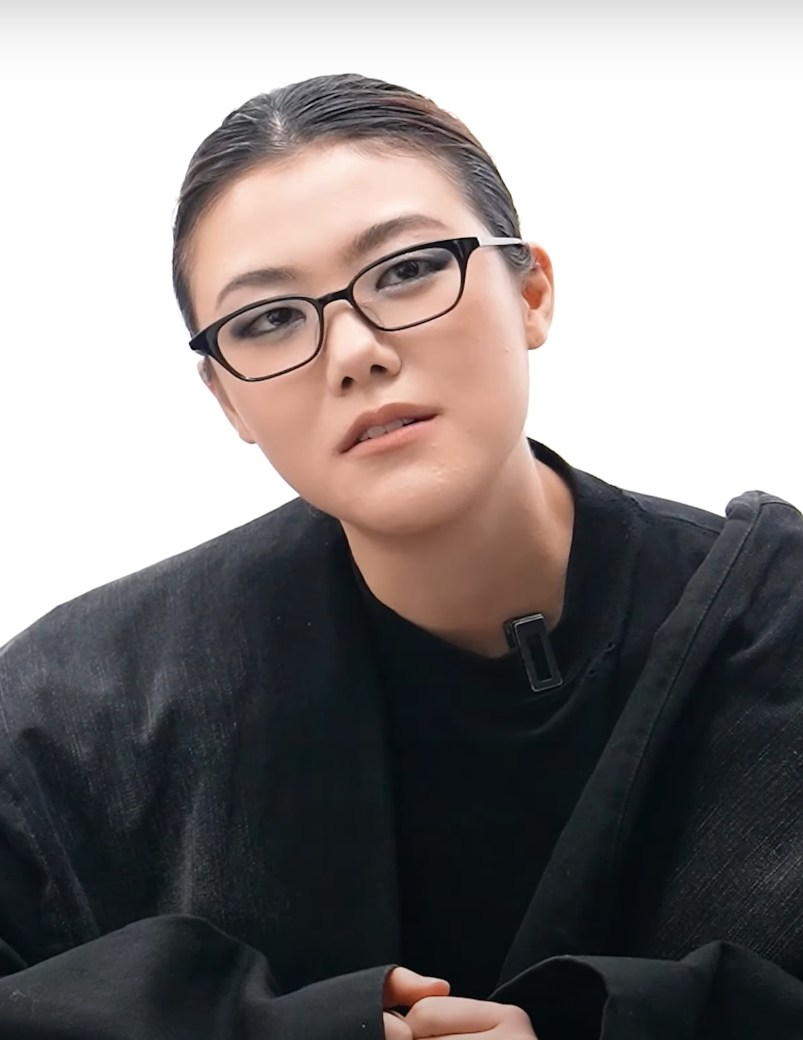
- Hwang in 2025
- Born: May 23, 1997 (age 29); Seoul, South Korea
- Other name: So!YoON!
- Occupations: Singer; songwriter; guitarist
- Years active: 2016–present
- Musical career
- Genres: Korean indie; pop rock; soul
- Instruments: Vocals, guitar
- Label: AWAL; Magic Strawberry Sound
- Member of: Se So Neon

Korean name
- Hangul: 황소윤
- RR: Hwang Soyun
- MR: Hwang Soyun

Hwang So-yoon (Korean: 황소윤; born 23 May 1997) is a South Korean musician. Hwang came to prominence as the lead vocalist of the indie rock band Se So Neon, of which she remains the band's only member. Initially a guitarist and pianist, Hwang is known primarily for her vocal range and lyricism, and is the recipient of eight Korean Music Award wins and nominations.

Since 2019, Hwang has performed under the solo moniker So!YoON! with two studio albums: So!YoON! (2019) and Episode 1: Love (2023). As a soloist, Hwang has collaborated with artists such as RM of BTS, Silica Gel, Phum Viphurit, Hoshi & Woozi of Seventeen, Park Ji-yoon and Enhypen. Hwang has also produced music for other artists, including Audrey Nuna and Teezo Touchdown.

== Career ==
=== As a member of Se So Neon ===
In 2016, at age 18, Hwang founded Se So Neon with drummer Gangto and bassist Fancy Moon. In 2017, the group had released their first EP Summer Plumage (여름깃), and won Rookie of the Year and Best Rock Song at the Korean Music Awards.

By 2018, both members had left to perform their mandatory military service, with Hwang recruiting Park Hyun-jin and U-su to take their place.

In 2020, Hwang and Se So Neon were named Fender's Global Artist of the Year, and were nominated for three additional Korean Music Awards. In 2021, the group were the only Korean act to be included in YouTube Music's global foundry program.

In 2023, Se So Neon's performance at Sungkyunkwan University was boycotted by students after social media comments by Hwang surfaced online. Hwang had previously publicly responded to the Nth Room scandal in 2020 by sharing an op-ed which criticized South Korean society for downplaying sexual exploitation and due to the high number of members in the Telegram chats, called for all men to be treated as potential criminals.

In 2024, Hwang and Se So Neon performed at SXSW despite a boycott by over 100 artists over the festival's sponsorship by the United States Department of Defense. Two days after the performance, the band released an apology expressing their regret, citing ignorance due the lack of Gaza-related coverage in South Korean media and extending condolences to civilians affected by the Gaza war.

After the departure of U-su in 2022, and Park Hyun-jin in 2025, Hwang remains the only active member of Se So Neon. On August 15, 2025, the band released their debut album Now.

=== Solo career ===
In 2018, Hwang began to release music under a solo moniker, So!YoON!. Her name was stylized "to build a new character and deliver the energy that's embedded within the way it's written". In July 2018, Hwang appeared on YB's single "Drifting Free". In October 2018, she appeared on Prep's single "Don't Look Back" alongside Shownu of Monsta X.

Hwang's debut solo album So!YoON! was released on May 21, 2019 and includes features from Sumin, Mid-Air Thief and Sam Kim. The album is a blend of indie rock, electronic and dream pop, and alternative R&B and was designed to show Hwang's musical ability to expand into different genres. In choosing an album cover, Hwang sent a handwritten letter to Australian artist Patricia Piccinini to use her sculpture "The Rookie" as a basis for the artwork. To promote the album, Hwang appeared on the covers of Marie Claire Korea and GQ Korea.

From 2019 to 2022, Hwang had a string of appearances as a featured artist for various Korean indie artists. She appeared on Avin's studio album TRANCE (2019) in the song "OMW" with Dbo. In August 2020, Hwang featured on "Do Not Disturb" by Woo. In April 2022, Hwang appeared on "Fort" by Kim Doeon.

In August 2019, Hwang expressed an interest in collaborating with Thai songwriter Phum Viphurit during an interview with GQ Korea. A year later, in October 2020, Hwang released the single "Wings" with Viphurit. The same month, Vogue Korea named her as one of the biggest female musicians in South Korea. In June 2022, Hwang performed the official Korean version of "Be Sweet" by Japanese Breakfast.

On March 14, 2023, Hwang released her sophomore studio album Episode1 : Love. The album includes lead single "Smoke Sprite" featuring RM of BTS, who Hwang met without intending to spark a collaboration with. After sharing their music to each other, they decided to write "Smoke Sprite" together. The album also features guest contributions from Jibin and Park Ji-yoon. In the music video for "Bad", Hwang portrayed a same-sex relationship, telling NME "there are many shapes and forms of love, and I just wanted to best visualize it. I wasn't particularly focused on it being the same-sex relationship, [but] I knew that gender shouldn't hold importance when representing love".

On August 19, 2023, Hwang co-wrote and featured on "Tik Tak Tok" by indie rock band Silica Gel. The song was nominated for multiple awards at the Korean Music Awards, including Song of the Year. In December 2023, Hwang performed a concert for Tiny Desk Korea, the international version of NPR's Tiny Desk series.

In September 2024, Hwang appeared at Alexander McQueen's 2025 Spring/Summer show.

On March 10, 2025, Hwang collaborated with Hoshi X Woozi to release "Pinocchio" on the duo's debut single album Beam.

== Personal life ==
Hwang So-yoon was born on 23 May, 1997, in Seoul, South Korea.

Hwang has reported feeling like a "stranger" in South Korea ever since her childhood, confirming this was the reasoning behind the title of Se So Neon's EP Nonadaptation (2020):

When I came back to Korea after a while, I felt like a stranger.

In fact, it's not just because I've been in Korea for a long time. Even though I was born and raised in Seoul, I always lived with the feeling of being a "stranger". I guess the word non-adaptation was deeply engraved in me. So, the title of my second EP was Nonadaptation, and there's a song with the same name. Rather than the environment or any specific events, I think the way I feel about this city is unfamiliar.

— Hwang So-yoon, during an interview with Eyesmag

Since 2025, Hwang has resided in Los Angeles, United States.

== Discography ==
=== Studio albums ===
List of studio albums
Title	Details
So!YoON!	Released: May 21, 2019; Label: Magic Strawberry Sound; Formats: Digital download, streaming, LP, CD
Episode 1: Love	Released: March 14, 2023; Label: Magic Strawberry Sound; Formats: Digital download, streaming, LP, CD

=== Singles ===
==== As lead artist ====
List of singles, showing year released and album
Title	Year	Album
"Holiday"	2019	So!YoON!
"Wings" (with Phum Viphurit)	2020	Non-album single
"Bad"	2023	Episode 1: Love
"Canada"	2023	Episode 1: Love
"Smoke Sprite" (featuring RM)	2023	Episode 1: Love
"Hwal Hwal" (활활)	2025	When Life Gives You Tangerines (OST from the Netflix Series)

==== As featured artist ====
List of singles as featured artist, showing album name and year released
Title	Year	Album
"Drifting Free" (YB featuring So!YoON!)	2018	Non-album single
"Don't Look Back" (Prep featuring Shownu & So!YoON!)	2018	Line by Line
"OMW" (Avin featuring So!YoON! & Dbo)	2019	Tranche
"Do Not Disturb" (Woo featuring So!YoON!)	2020	Black Out
"Like a Vampire" (Tabber featuring So!YoON!)	2020	Deep End Mix Tape
"Mom" (이수호 featuring So!YoON!)	2021	Monika
"Fort" (Kim Doeon featuring So!YoON!)	2022	Damage
"Be Sweet" (Korean Version) (Japanese Breakfast featuring So!YoON!)	2022	Non-album single
"Forever" (Rad Museum featuring So!YoON!)	2022	RAD
"Witch" (Lee Young-ji featuring So!YoON! & Jay Park)	2022	Show Me the Money 11
"Tik Tak Tok" (Silica Gel featuring So!YoON!)	2023	Power Andre 99
"E-Girl" (Sokodomo featuring So!YoON!)	2024	Sweet Heart
"Interplanetary Hoppin" (Lava La Rue featuring So!YoON!)	2024	Starface
"Pinocchio" (Hoshi X Woozi featuring So!YoON!)	2025	Beam
"No Way Back" (Enhypen featuring So!YoON!)	2026	The Sin: Vanish

=== Songwriting and production credits ===
List of songs produced by So!YoON! for other artists, showing year released, artist name, and name of the album
Song	Year	Artist	Album	Lyricist	Producer	Vocals
"Starving" (featuring Teezo Touchdown)	2024	Audrey Nuna	Trench	No	Yes	Yes

== Awards and accolades ==
Awards and nominations
Award	Year	Category	Nominee	Result	Ref.
Shinhan Card Rookie Project	2016	—N/a	Se So Neon	Silver	
Korean Music Awards	2018	Rookie of the Year	Se So Neon	Won	
Korean Music Awards	2018	Best Rock Song	"The Wave" (파도)	Won	
Korean Music Awards	2018	Best Rock Album	Summer Plumage	Nominated	
Korean Music Awards	2020	Best Rock Song	"Go Back" (집에)	Nominated	
Korean Music Awards	2021	Best Rock Album	Nonadaptation	Nominated	
Korean Music Awards	2021	Best Rock Song	"Nan Chun" (난춘)	Nominated	
Korean Music Awards	2024	Best Modern Rock Song	"Tik Tak Tok" (featuring So!YoON!)	Won	
Korean Music Awards	2024	Song of the Year	"Tik Tak Tok" (featuring So!YoON!)	Nominated	
Melon Music Awards	2023	Best Music Style	"Tik Tak Tok" (featuring So!YoON!)	Won	

Year-end lists
Publication	List	Work	Ref.
Pitchfork	The 35 Best Rock Albums of 2020	Nonadaptation	
Paste	The 40 Best Rock Albums of 2020	Nonadaptation	
