= Play with Earth! 0.03 =

2024 studio album by Wave to Earth

EP by Wave to Earth
- Released: September 6, 2024
- Genres: Soft rock; indie rock; dream pop
- Length: 25:04
- Label: Wavy
- Producer: Daniel Kim

Wave to Earth chronology
0.1 Flaws and All (2023)	Play with Earth! 0.03 (2024)	Bad Pieces (2026)

Play with Earth! 0.03 (stylized in all lowercase) is the third extended play by the South Korean indie rock band Wave to Earth, released on September 6, 2024, through Wavy. It follows their 2023 debut album, 0.1 Flaws and All.

== Background and recording ==
Wave to Earth released their debut studio album, 0.1 Flaws and All in 2023. They only had two months to produce Play with Earth! 0.03.

== Production and composition ==
=== Overview ===
The album is primarily a soft rock, indie rock, and dream pop album. Play with Earth! 0.03 keeps the band's usual sound from their last projects. It exhibits their signature blend of comfort, excitement, and melancholy with their youthfulness and playfulness.

=== Songs ===
The intro track, "Are You Bored?" is a short instrumental with qualities of lo-fi music and synth-pop. The title track, "Play With Earth!", is upbeat and contains an aquatic ambience that reminisces of the band's 2020 EP Wave 0.01. The third song, "Annie.", is the band's first explicit song and is a joyful narrative of the narrator getting over a girl who told lies about him. "Pueblo" was a song originally released in 2020 and is a more livelier song with elements of pop rock. "Beck." shows the narrator having insecurities about chasing his dreams, but later finding that he has his friends with him. The last two songs, "Slow Dive" and "Holyland", are slower, more soothing songs; the first half of the latter song is influenced by R&B and soul.

== Release and promotion ==
Play with Earth! 0.03 was released on September 6, 2024. To support the album, Wave to Earth embarked on their second world tour.

== Track listing ==
All tracks are written by Daniel Kim, except where noted. All music is composed by Daniel Kim.

Play with Earth! 0.03 track listing
No.	Title	Writer(s)	Length
1.	"Are You Bored?"		1:51
2.	"Play with Earth!"		3:01
3.	"Annie."	Daniel Kim; Soonjong Cha	3:20
4.	"Pueblo - Remastered 2024"		3:47
5.	"Beck."		4:06
6.	"Slow Dive"		4:33
7.	"Holyland"	Kim; Cha; Donggyu Shin	4:22
Total length:			25:04

Extended edition (bonus track)
No.	Title	Writer(s)	Length
8.	"Annie. (clean)"	Kim; Cha	3:20
Total length:			28:25

Notes

- All tracks are stylized in lowercase.

== Charts ==
Weekly chart performance for Play with Earth! 0.03
Chart (2024–2025)	Peak position
South Korean Albums (Circle)	17
US Top Album Sales (Billboard)	43
