= Bad Pieces =

Studio album by Wave to Earth
- Released: August 7, 2026
- Genre: Indie rock
- Length: 42:37
- Languages: English, Korean
- Label: Wavy
- Producer: Daniel Kim

Wave to Earth chronology
| Play with Earth! 0.03 (2022) | Bad Pieces (2026) |

Singles from Bad Pieces
- 1. "Heaven and Hell" Released: May 15, 2026; 2. "Courage" Released: August 7, 2026; 3. "Hyang" Released: August 7, 2026

Bad Pieces (stylized in all lowercase) is the second studio album by South Korean indie rock band Wave to Earth, released by Wavy on August 7, 2026. Primarily written by Daniel Kim, the album contains 11 tracks, including two title tracks, "Courage" and "Hyang", and the pre-release single "Heaven and Hell". To promote the album, the band embarked on The Pieces Tour from September to December 2026.

== Background and release ==
After a hiatus of one year and eight months, Wave to Earth has announced their return with a pre-release single, "Heaven and Hell", which was released on May 15, 2026. The band has been building anticipation for the comeback since April by sharing teasers through fan communities and social media, including videos of the filming location in Mexico and behind-the-scenes footage. On July 10, the band released a pre-release video titled "Babo" through their official social media accounts and YouTube channel. On August 7, the band has released their new album, Bad Pieces.

The music video for the single "Courage", released alongside Bad Pieces, was inspired by the bed-in anti-war protest held by John Lennon and Yoko Ono in 1969 in response to the Vietnam War. Following the album's release, Wave to Earth also released a music video for the single "Hyang" on August 14, 2026, featuring actor Lee Sang-yi as its protagonist. The video depicted the revival of past memories through Lee's facial expressions, gaze, and movements, conveying the song's emotional themes without dialogue. On August 25, the band also released a music video for "Everything Comes and Goes", featuring Justin Min as an ordinary man who walks and runs through the city from night until dawn without a clear destination. The video portrayed his repeated, uncoordinated dance movements as an expression of anxiety and emptiness.

== Composition ==
=== Music and lyrical themes ===
In an interview with Arena Homme + Korea, the members described Bad Pieces as a romantic album in terms of its lyrics, sound, and overall arrangement. Daniel Kim explained that despite its romantic atmosphere, the album's production process was demanding due to the tight schedule, with the members often having to work mechanically and out of obligation. John Cha revealed that the album's release date had been set before all the tracks were completed, adding that the members nevertheless sought to create something meaningful as artists. He described the album as an attempt to find romance amid an otherwise unromantic process. When asked about the first song composed for the album, Kim identified "Talking 'Bout U", the opening track, explaining that its creation gave the members a sense of something growing within the group, which he compared to the development of a living organism.

Bad Pieces expands upon the lo-fi jazz foundation that introduced Wave to Earth to an international audience, incorporating new instruments and a broader range of sonic elements. The band attributed this musical evolution to a growing understanding of their artistic identity, prioritizing an honest representation of their experiences and emotions over repeating the formula of their previous work. The album incorporates instruments such as nylon-string guitar and the Minimoog into the band's established sound, while adopting a more restrained musical approach that emphasizes simplicity over technical complexity. Daniel Kim stated that the album featured greater creative contributions from John Cha and Dong Q than the band's previous releases. He described its central theme as preserving childlike innocence amid the transition into adulthood, which he viewed as the closing of the group's first chapter of life.

In an interview with Hit Parader, Daniel Kim described "Skylark" as the most challenging track on the album to write, citing its unfamiliar musical direction and lengthy production process. He explained that the group overcame creative blocks by revisiting their early musical influences, particularly Motown, while the song features a danceable rhythm reminiscent of Michael Jackson's musical style. In an interview with Ones to Watch, Kim revealed that "Heaven and Hell" originated from a demo by John Cha, which he initially described as a happy and lighthearted song. Kim later reworked the track with a darker and more introspective approach.

=== Songs ===
Bad Pieces opens with "Talking 'Bout U", an indie pop track characterized by spacious guitar shimmer and subdued vocals, establishing the album's warm, atmospheric sound while exploring infatuation and the realization that one's thoughts continually return to a particular person The second track, "Everything Comes and Goes", maintains the album's subdued atmosphere through its circular, dreamlike presentation, exploring the impermanence of life and the inevitability of memories, emotions, and experiences passing over time. "Babo", a gentle acoustic ballad and the album's second pre-release single, is characterized by its stripped-back arrangement and explores the vulnerability of recognizing one's feelings for someone only after failing to act on them, with its Korean title translating to "fool" or "idiot". The following track, "Sing It All Again", shifts toward personal growth and healing, using imagery of purity, blooming gardens, and finding one's way back home to convey the search for self-understanding and a sense of belonging. "Skylark" continues the album's folk-psychedelic direction, exploring the difficulty of letting go of a relationship through fading memories and the recurring image of a skylark as a metaphor for releasing someone rather than holding onto them.

The sixth track, "Courage", is an emotionally raw ballad with a soft-rock sway, exploring vulnerability, mutual hurt, and the uncertainty that accompanies changing relationships, ultimately expressing the desire to find the strength to confront these feelings. "Cherry Flavoured Love Inside Your Heart" follows with a more reassuring perspective on love and belonging, encouraging self-acceptance and finding meaning in shared moments despite the uncertainty of whether relationships will last forever. The eighth track, "Hyang", a double title track whose Korean title translates to "scent" or "fragrance", explores how sensory memories, particularly the lingering aroma of another person, can evoke recollections of a past relationship, while its reference to being a fool recalls the earlier track "Babo". "You" returns to the difficulties of maintaining a relationship, portraying the contradiction between recognizing the pain experienced by both individuals and desperately wanting to preserve their emotional connection. The album concludes with "Heaven and Hell" and "Closing", with the former questioning moral judgment and encouraging a return to childlike openness, while the latter uses sunset and changing seasons as imagery for accepting loss, embracing uncertainty, and finding reassurance in the possibility of new beginnings.

== Promotion ==
On May 18, 2026, Wave to Earth announced The Pieces Tour, a world tour spanning 30 cities. The tour was organized as an extension of the promotional activities for the band's second studio album, Bad Pieces. Additionally, the band has held a seven-day pop-up event titled Wave to Earth Pop-Up Event – Lost & Found at The Hyundai Seoul from October 22 to 28. Organized alongside the tour, the event introduced the concept of the band's second studio album, Bad Pieces, to domestic fans ahead of their Seoul concert in December. It featured the album's central theme of fragmented pieces coming together to form a sense of sincerity.

== Reception ==
According to IZM, Bad Pieces retains Wave to Earth's signature lo-fi sound while incorporating variations in its musical arrangements and more refined production. The album explores themes of love, loss, and memories, presenting familiar emotions through a renewed perspective. The magazine also highlighted the jazz influences in "Everything Comes and Goes" and the raw musical textures of "Sing It All Again", while describing "Courage" as featuring Beatles-inspired melodies and lyrics about parting. The review noted that the album maintains the band's characteristic warmth and emotional depth while reflecting their musical development.

"Heaven and Hell" was ranked eighth on Billboard's The 25 Best K-Pop Songs of 2026 (So Far): Staff Picks, with the publication praising its gradual buildup of layered vocals, guitars, and percussion. They also highlighted its cinematic arrangement and extended runtime, describing it as a deliberate return for the band following a 20-month hiatus.

== Track listing ==
All tracks are written by Daniel Kim, additional writers were noted.

Bad Pieces track listing
| No. | Title | Writer(s) | Length |
|---|---|---|---|
| 1. | "Talking 'Bout U" | John Cha; Jiwoo | 4:14 |
| 2. | "Everything Comes and Goes" | | 4:19 |
| 3. | "Babo" | | 2:51 |
| 4. | "Sing It All Again" | | 3:55 |
| 5. | "Skylark" | Cha | 3:06 |
| 6. | "Courage" | Cha | 3:11 |
| 7. | "Cherry Flavoured Love Inside Your Heart" | Dong Q | 4:28 |
| 8. | "Hyang" | | 3:16 |
| 9. | "You" | Wave to Earth | 4:21 |
| 10. | "Heaven and Hell" | Cha | 4:28 |
| 11. | "Closing" | | 4:22 |
| Total length: | | | 42:37 |

=== Notes ===
- All track titles are stylized in all lowercase.

== Personnel ==
These credits were adapted from Melon.

=== Musicians ===
- Daniel Kim – vocals (all tracks); chorus (tracks 1, 2, 4–7, 9–11); guitars (tracks 1–7, 9–11); bass (track 1); synthesizers (tracks 1, 4, 5, 8, 11); CP70 (tracks 7, 8); Minimoog (tracks 4, 8, 10); Mellotron (track 6); Rhodes (track 11); songwriting (tracks 1–11); lyrics (tracks 1–8, 10, 11)
- John Cha – bass (tracks 1, 2, 5–9, 11); fretless bass (track 5); synthesizers (track 5); Minimoog (track 10); keys (track 10); songwriting (tracks 1, 5, 6, 10); lyrics (tracks 1, 5, 6, 10)
- Dong Q – drums (tracks 1, 2, 4–9, 11); programmed drums (track 10); CP70 (track 9); songwriting (tracks 7, 9)
- Van Sion – Rhodes and CP70 (track 2); CP70 (tracks 4, 6); organ (track 7)
- Jeon Min – saxophone (tracks 2, 11)
- Jiwoo – lyrics (track 1)
- Wave to Earth – lyrics (track 9)

=== Technical ===
- Daniel Kim – production, recording, mixing (all tracks)
- John Cha – mastering (all tracks)

== Charts ==
Weekly chart performance for Bad Pieces
| Chart (2026) | Peak position |
|---|---|
| South Korean Albums (Circle) | 45 |
