= Episode 1: Love =

2023 studio album by So!YoON!

Studio album by So!YoON!
- Released: 14 March 2023
- Genre: R&B; neo-soul; neo-psychedelia; art pop; k-pop; art rock
- Length: 38:09
- Language: English, Korean
- Label: Magic Strawberry Sound

So!YoON! chronology
So!YoON! (2019)	Episode 1: Love (2023)

Singles from Episode 1: Love
- 1. "Bad" Released: 17 February 2023; 2. "Canada" Released: 17 February 2023; 3. "Smoke Sprite (feat. RM)" Released: 14 March 2023

Episode 1: Love (stylized as Episode1 : Love) is the sophomore studio album of South Korean musician Hwang So-yoon under her solo moniker So!YoON!. It was released on 14 March 2023 through Magic Strawberry Sound, and is Hwang's final album to be released by the label. Episode 1: Love features 11 tracks, including appearances from RM of BTS, Jibin of Y2K92, and Park Ji-yoon.

== Release ==
On 17 February 2023, Hwang released "Bad" and "Canada" into an EP under the name Prologue: Love. In the music video for "Bad", Hwang portrays herself kissing a woman in various scenes, leading to surprise at her representation of a same-sex relationship. In her explanation of the music video, Hwang stated "there are many shapes and forms of love, and I just wanted to best visualize it. I wasn't particularly focused on it being a same-sex relationship, [but] I knew that gender shouldn't hold importance when representing love". In response to the reception, Hwang admitted "the backlash wasn't as much as I had imagined".

On 14 March 2023, the day of the album's release, Hwang dropped the lead single "Smoke Sprite" featuring RM of BTS. Hwang and RM had met the previous summer to share songs with each other. Upon hearing Hwang's demo of "Smoke Sprite", the pair collaborated to write the lyrics and produce the track together.

On 13 April 2023, Hwang released a commentary album for Episode 1: Love, featuring narration from herself and the album's collaborators to provide insight into the creative process behind each song. The album also included recordings from Song Tae-jong, the music video director of "Bad".

== Critical reception ==
Upon release, Mary Sirosky of Consequence described the album's lead single "Smoke Sprite" as "effortlessly cool" while The Bias List gave it a rating of 8/10, calling it a "much more alternative sound than the glossy K-pop surrounding it".

Kathleen Herrera of The K Meal called the broader album a "non-skip masterpiece" that has a "very alternative sound [which] is cohesive and beautiful".

On aggregate site Album of the Year, Episode 1: Love has a rating of 76/100 based on 102 ratings.

== Track listing ==
No.	Title	Length
1.	"IN (Void)"	2:36
2.	"Smoke Sprite (feat. RM)"	4:02
3.	"Till the sun goes up"	3:36
4.	"Bad"	4:00
5.	"Why don't you take me out? - Skit"	2:50
6.	"Gave you all my love (feat. Jibin)"	4:13
7.	"Zone out; - Skit"	0:35
8.	"Exit"	3:37
9.	"Love (a secret visitor) (feat. Park Ji-yoon)"	4:14
10.	"Canada"	4:55
11.	"Out"	3:28
