= End Theory =

Studio album by Younha
- Released: November 16, 2021
- Genre: Future bass; electronic; rock; R&B
- Length: 39:36
- Language: Korean
- Label: C9

Younha chronology
Unstable Mindset (2020)	End Theory (2021)

Singles from End Theory
- 1. "Stardust" Released: November 16, 2021; 2. "Event Horizon" Released: March 30, 2022

End Theory: Final Edition cover

End Theory is the sixth studio album by South Korean singer Younha. It was released on November 16, 2021, through C9 Entertainment. It consists of eleven tracks, including the lead single "Stardust". The reissue version of the album, titled End Theory: Final Edition, was released on March 30, 2022.

The lead single "Event Horizon" from the reissue End Theory: Final Edition emerged as a major commercial success in South Korea topping the Circle Digital Chart in November 2022 and achieving a PAK on several music charts.

== Background and composition ==
End Theory contains stories about different kinds of "end", like the end of the Earth, of a relationship, or of the universe, and conveys the singer's messages through metaphors related to the cosmos. It took eleven months to complete it, as Younha started working on it at the beginning of the COVID-19 pandemic. In an interview with Esquire Korea, the singer explained that she thought of using the end as a theme when she started thinking she needed to make an album to comfort people who couldn't meet and were waiting for it to end, "like singing a song about peace when war breaks out. To do that, you need to know what's at the end. [...] There should always be hope."

Younha wrote the lyrics, and sometimes the music, for most of the 11 songs; among them, the selection of the title track fell on pop ballad "Stardust", as she thought it showed the preciousness and the importance of the process from a beginning to an end better than the others. The song, which talks about the precious beings met on planet Earth and what true love is, was composed by her best friend and member of composition team Urban Zakapa Kwon Sun-il, with Younha penning the lyrics, and started from the question "What kind of useful person am I?" "P.R.R.W." stands for Process, Result and Reason Why.

Aside from Younha and Kwon, the producing team includes Jewno and James Son; the latter joined after appealing, through Kwon, to participate, leading Younha to ask him for a demo out of curiosity. The collaboration with Sarah Kang on "Tik-Tok" was born at the suggestion of Younha after seeing an acoustic live performance of Kang playing the guitar outdoors, and they worked on the song through video calls. The Korean title, which translates to "6 years and 230 days", refers to the days left to the destruction of the Earth.

On March 30, 2022, End Theory was repackaged as End Theory: Final Edition adding three additional songs, "C/2022YH", "Event Horizon" and "Black Hole", based on rock music. "C/2022YH", whose Korean title means "comet", is a pop rock fast tempo song with a 16-bit piano riff; "Event Horizon" is the name of the outer boundary of a black hole, a completely uncharted territory that Younha compared to a breakup, when no one knows what will happen next; "Black Hole" is a future bass pop song where she tells a black hole she will never forget the moment it was a star. Younha took charge of the lyrics and composition of all three songs.

== Critical reception ==
Professional ratings
Review scores
Source	Rating
IZM	4/5 stars

Son Gi-ho from IZM gave the album 4 out of 5 stars; he called it "intense" from the first track, stating: "All the songs in the album are sincere to capture both the person who rescued her and the music," and concluding "The light reached after countless attempts and failures gives Younha a chance to grow on her own and becomes a medium in the name of hope that will unite her and the public again. In that way, a solid galaxy that will not be shaken by any adversity is born."

Art Insight wrote: "Younha's End Theory doesn't erase the existence of sadness and failure from life, but looks straight ahead. [...] It contains confidence for tomorrow and gives support and comfort with a trustworthy message of 'I will be by your side'."

End Theory was featured on Time's list of the best K-pop songs and albums of 2021, while Billboard chose "Stardust" as the 13th best K-pop song of 2021 for its simplicity made of "simple, beautiful chord progression that grows naturally within the song's orchestral production."

== Accolades ==
Awards and nominations
Organization	Year	Category	Result	Ref.
Korean Music Awards	2023	Song of the Year (Daesang) (for "Event Horizon")	Won	
Korean Music Awards	2023	Best Pop Song (for "Event Horizon")	Won	

Music program awards
Song	Program	Date	Ref.
"Event Horizon"	Inkigayo	November 27, 2022	
"Event Horizon"	Inkigayo	December 4, 2022	
"Event Horizon"	Inkigayo	December 11, 2022	
"Event Horizon"	Music Bank	December 23, 2022	

== Track listing ==
End Theory track listing
No.	Title	Lyrics	Music	Arrangement	Length
1.	"P.R.R.W."	Younha; James Son	Younha; Jewno	Jewno	3:14
2.	"Big Picture" (나는 계획이 있다)	Kim Su-ji (Lalala Studio)	Younha; Jewno	Jewno	3:20
3.	"Oort Cloud" (오르트구름)	Danke (Lalala Studio)	Jewno; KZ; Hoff	Jewno	3:26
4.	"Wish" (물의 여행)	Danke	Younha; Jewno	Jewno	2:54
5.	"How U Doing" (잘 지내)	Younha	Younha	Jewno	4:05
6.	"Highlight" (반짝, 빛을 내)	Younha; Danke	Younha; Jewno; Jade	Jewno	3:29
7.	"Tik-Tok" (6년 230일)	Younha	Sarah Kang	Patrick Hizon; Jewno; Lee Ha-eun	3:28
8.	"Truly"	Younha	Younha	Jewno	3:35
9.	"Stardust" (별의 조각)	Younha	Kwon Sun-il	Jewno	3:50
10.	"Here" (하나의 달)	Younha	Younha; James Son	Kim Dong-min; Shaun	4:41
11.	"Savior"	Younha; James Son	James Son	Shaun	3:34
Total length:					39:36

End Theory: Final Edition track listing
No.	Title	Lyrics	Music	Arrangement	Length
1.	"Oort Cloud" (오르트구름)				3:26
2.	"C/2022YH" (살별)	Younha	Younha; Jewno	Jewno	3:15
3.	"Wish" (물의 여행)				2:54
4.	"Highlight" (반짝, 빛을 내)				3:29
5.	"Tik-Tok" (6년 230일)				3:28
6.	"P.R.R.W."				3:14
7.	"Big Picture" (나는 계획이 있다)				3:20
8.	"Truly"				3:35
9.	"Stardust" (별의 조각)				3:50
10.	"Here" (하나의 달)				4:41
11.	"Event Horizon" (사건의 지평선)	Younha	Younha; Jewno	Jewno; Shaun	5:00
12.	"Black Hole"	Younha	Younha; Jewno; Shaun; Samin; Hardy	Jewno; Shaun	3:08
13.	"Savior"				3:34
14.	"How U Doing" (잘 지내)				4:05
Total length:					50:59

== Charts ==
=== Weekly charts ===
Weekly chart performance for End Theory
Chart (2021)	Peak position
South Korean Albums (Gaon)	15

Weekly chart performance for End Theory: Final Edition
Chart (2022)	Peak position
South Korean Albums (Gaon)	16

=== Monthly charts ===
Monthly chart performance for End Theory
Chart (2021)	Peak position
South Korean Albums (Gaon)	68

Monthly chart performance for End Theory: Final Edition
Chart (2022)	Peak position
South Korean Albums (Gaon)	84
