= Bye Bye Badman (band) =

South Korean indie pop band

- Origin: Seoul, South Korea
- Genres: Indie pop; indie rock; synth-pop
- Years active: 2009-present
- Labels: C9 Entertainment, Magic Strawberry Sound
- Members: Jeong Bongkil; Gwak Minhyeok; Luli Lee; Gooreum
- Past members: Jeong Hansol

Bye Bye Badman is a South Korean indie pop band. The band currently consists of Jeong Bongkil, Gwak Minhyeok, Luli Lee and Gooreum. Since their formation in 2009, the band has released two studio albums: Light Beside You (2011) and Authentic (2015). Their band name is derived from the track on The Stone Roses' album The Stone Roses. They won Rookie of the Year at the 2012 Korean Music Awards.

== Career ==
Bye Bye Badman was formed in July 2009, and all but one was a high school student at the time of their formation. In 2010, they performed at the Jisan Valley Rock Festival. They released their self-title EP in 2011, and in the same year, they won the Grand prize in the EBS Hello Rookie Contest. They released their first studio album Light Beside You, and won Rookie of the Year at the 2012 Korean Music Awards.

In 2013 they released the EP Because I Want To. They stopped performing after the EP's release and began to take a break, and the band said they needed time to recharge because they ran nonstop for about three years and were trying to concentrate on working on the album. In 2015, they released their second studio album Authentic. In 2016, they signed with C9 Entertainment.

In 2017, they released an EP Wave (너의 파도). In 2018, they released a single Daisy featuring Kim Yoon-ju of Rooftop Moonlight. Member Jung Bongkil later joined the supergroup TRPP as a member, and Luli Lee released her first solo studio album Fade Away Like a Dream in 2022.

== Discography ==
=== Studio albums ===
- Light Beside You (2011)
- Authentic (2015)
- Bad Timing (2025)

=== EPs ===
- Bye Bye Badman (2011)
- Because I Want To (2013)
- Wave (너의 파도) (2017)
