= Salamanda (band) =

South Korean ambient artist

Salamanda is a South Korean left field ambient duo composed of Uman Therma and Yetsuby who met in 2018.

== Background ==
Jimin Sung and Yejin Jang have their own solo projects called Uman Therma and Yetsuby respectively. However, as part of the Salamanda duo, Sung uses the pseudonym Sala while Jang uses the pseudonym Manda.

Yetsuby started playing piano at 4 years old and studied composition at university. Uman Therma did not have any musical education. The two met in 2018 and began working together as Salamanda. Yetsuby is based out of Seoul and Uman Therma is based out of Gyeonggi. Yetsuby grew up in a Christian family.

Salamanda draws inspiration from the spirits in Studio Ghibli animations and use field recordings throughout their music. They also draw inspiration from old video games and NASA space videos.

In 2020, they released their first EP under the record label Tonal Unity. At the time, both of them lived in Mullae-dong, a very industrial neighborhood, which influenced the sound of the EP.

In 2022, Salamanda released their album ashbalkum, which was produced by Human Pitch. The title of the album is a Korean phrase that means reality is a dream. The album was inspired by Uman's artwork of a bathtub.

Sala cites Japanese artist WaqWaq Kingdom's album Shinsekai as a major inspiration. Manda cites 7th Issue by K-Pop artist Seo Taiji as a major inspiration.

Ashbalkum was nominated for best electronic album in the 20th Korean Music Awards.

Salamanda was featured on a compilation album produced by the Ilmin Museum of Art.

== Discography ==
=== Studio albums ===
- Sphere (2021)
- ashbalkum (2022)
- In Parallel (2023)

=== Extended Plays ===
- Our Lair (2019)
- Allez! (2020)
- Glass Cage (2021)

=== Singles ===
- "Our Lair" (2021)
- "Open Sesame" (2021)
- "Let it Rain" (2021)
- "Dumbo Cage" (2021)
- "Crystal Heart" (2021)
- "Agnus my dei" (2021)
- "Florisa 5 ma gosh what should i do?" (2021)
- "Kali" (2021)
- "Happy Quarantine" (2021)
- "Overdose" (2022)
- "Melting Hazard" (2022)
- "Catching Tails" (2022)
- "Coconut Warrior" (2022)
- "Sharing Prosperity" (2022)
- "Truffle Sprinkles" (2022)
- "Drink Wisdom" (2022)

=== Guest appearances ===
- Anchorsong – "Windmills (Salamanda Remix)" (2023)
- yingtuitive – "blue – Salamanda Remix" (2025)

=== Compilation appearances ===
- "Aiya" from The Songs for the NOT-YETs (2020)
- "Beyond Time" from Seasons 2020 (F/W) (2020)
- "Fin Immature" from Taraxia (2022)
- "Truffles Sprinkles" from Chill Pill Volume IV (2022)
- "Kind Regards" from "A Better Place" (2022)
- "κρήνη της νύμφης" from To Illustrate (2022)
- "Drink Wisdom" from it wasn't really me (2022)
- "Mockingbird" from Gudu & Friends Vol. 1 (2023)
- "Mirror Mirror" from UwU all starz (2023)
- "Windmills (Salamanda Remix)" from Shapes: Collide (Compiled by Robert Luis) (2023)
- "Windmills (Salamanda Remix)" from Tru Thoughts 2023 (2023)
- "Baraka - Salamanda Remix" from Hailu Remixes (2024)
