= Here to Stay (TV series) =

- Genre: Drama anthology
- Country of origin: Canada
- Original language: English
- No. of seasons: 1
- No. of episodes: 6

Production
- Running time: 60 minutes

Original release
- Network: CBC Television
- Release: 28 November 1976 – 9 January 1977

Here to Stay is a Canadian drama television anthology miniseries that aired on CBC Television from 1976 to 1977.

== Premise ==
Six different dramatic productions were featured, all relating to the experience of those immigrating to Canada.

== Scheduling ==
Hour-long episodes were broadcast Sundays at 9:00 p.m. (Eastern) from 28 November 1976 to 9 January 1977. The final film in this series was effectively the 1977 season debut of CBC's For The Record series.

== Episodes ==
- The Day My Grandad Died (David Peddie producer; Rene Bonniere director; Michael John Nimchuk writer)
- Honour Thy Father (David Peddie producer; Tony Ferris director; Nika Rylski writer)
- Kaleshnikoff (Philip Keatley producer)
- Maria (Stephen Patrick producer; Allan King director; Rick Salutin writer)
- Turncoat (Beverly Roberts producer; Alan Cooke director; Jonah Royston writer)
- Yesterday Was Years Ago (Eoin Sprott producer; René Bonnière director; Anna Reiser writer)
