= Here to Stay (TRPP album) =

2022 album by TRPP

Studio album by TRPP
- Released: September 17, 2022
- Genre: Shoegaze, dream pop
- Length: 52:23
- Label: Magic Strawberry Sound

TRPP chronology
| TRPP (2021) | Here to Stay (2022) |

Here to Stay is the second studio album by South Korean shoegaze band TRPP. The album was released on 17 September 2022. The album is an album released a year after TRPP's first full-length self-titled album, and the album was recorded focusing on the life in one structure.

== Critical reception ==
Professional ratings
Review scores
| Source | Rating |
|---|---|
| IZM | 3/5 stars |

Son Minhyeon of IZM reviewed "Here to Stay is a process in which chance encounters result in new discoveries, and TRPP is an interesting serendipity in themselves." Kim Byeongwoo of Music Y reviewed the track Here To Stay "The track retains the unique self-meditation character of shoegaze, but it has a strong sound that seems to have hardened the wick compared to their first album." The member of the selection committee for the Korean Music Awards Bae Soontak described the album as "The album where the melody permeates the hearing while swimming in the sea of noise like a ray of light" and nominated it for the 2023 Best Modern Rock Album.

== Track listing ==
| No. | Title | Length |
|---|---|---|
| 1. | "Here to Stay" | 6:17 |
| 2. | "Clue" | 3:50 |
| 3. | "Play" | 4:08 |
| 4. | "Lifetime" | 2:40 |
| 5. | "Reflection" ("반사") | 3:55 |
| 6. | "Meditation" ("명상") | 5:26 |
| 7. | "Higher Than the Sun" | 2:52 |
| 8. | "Little Boy / The Darkest Day" | 4:14 |
| 9. | "Dodgy" | 3:57 |
| 10. | "Rainbow Spell" | 4:36 |
| 11. | "Oblivion" | 4:24 |
| 12. | "Furykawa" | 1:37 |
| 13. | "Circle" | 5:27 |
