= Ohchill =

South Korean alternative rock band

- Origin: Jeonju, South Korea
- Genres: alternative rock
- Years active: 2014-present
- Label: Mirrorball
- Members: Yoon Joonhong; Kim Seol

Ohchill (Korean: 오칠, stylised as OHCHILL) is a South Korean alternative rock band, formed in Jeonju. The band currently consists of Yoon Joonhong and Kim Seol. Since their formation in 2014, the band has released two studio albums Oh, Two Animals (2019) and The Burning City (2023).

== History ==
Ohchill was formed in Jeonju in 2014, and Yoon Joonhong and Kim Seol are both from Jeonju. The band's name comes from Biffy Clyro's album Blackened Sky's track 57. They released EP 57 in 2014.

Their first studio album, Oh, Two Animals, was released in 2019. Kim Seongdae of the Korean Music Awards was nominated for Best Rock Album, describing the album to Queens of the Stone Age.

In 2023, they released their second studio album, The Burning City. Music Y's Lee Arim described the album as "The Burning City is music that seems to show the fierceness of life confronting the crazy world without expediency through honesty and highlights the aspect of maturity and moderation." The album was nominated for the 2024 Korean Music Awards.

== Members ==
- Yoon Joonhong – vocals, guitar
- Kim Seol – vocals, drums

== Discography ==
=== Studio albums ===
- Oh, Two Animals (2019)
- The Burning City (2023)

=== Extended plays ===
- 57 (2014)
