= Silica Gel (band) =

South Korean indie rock band

Silica Gel 실리카겔
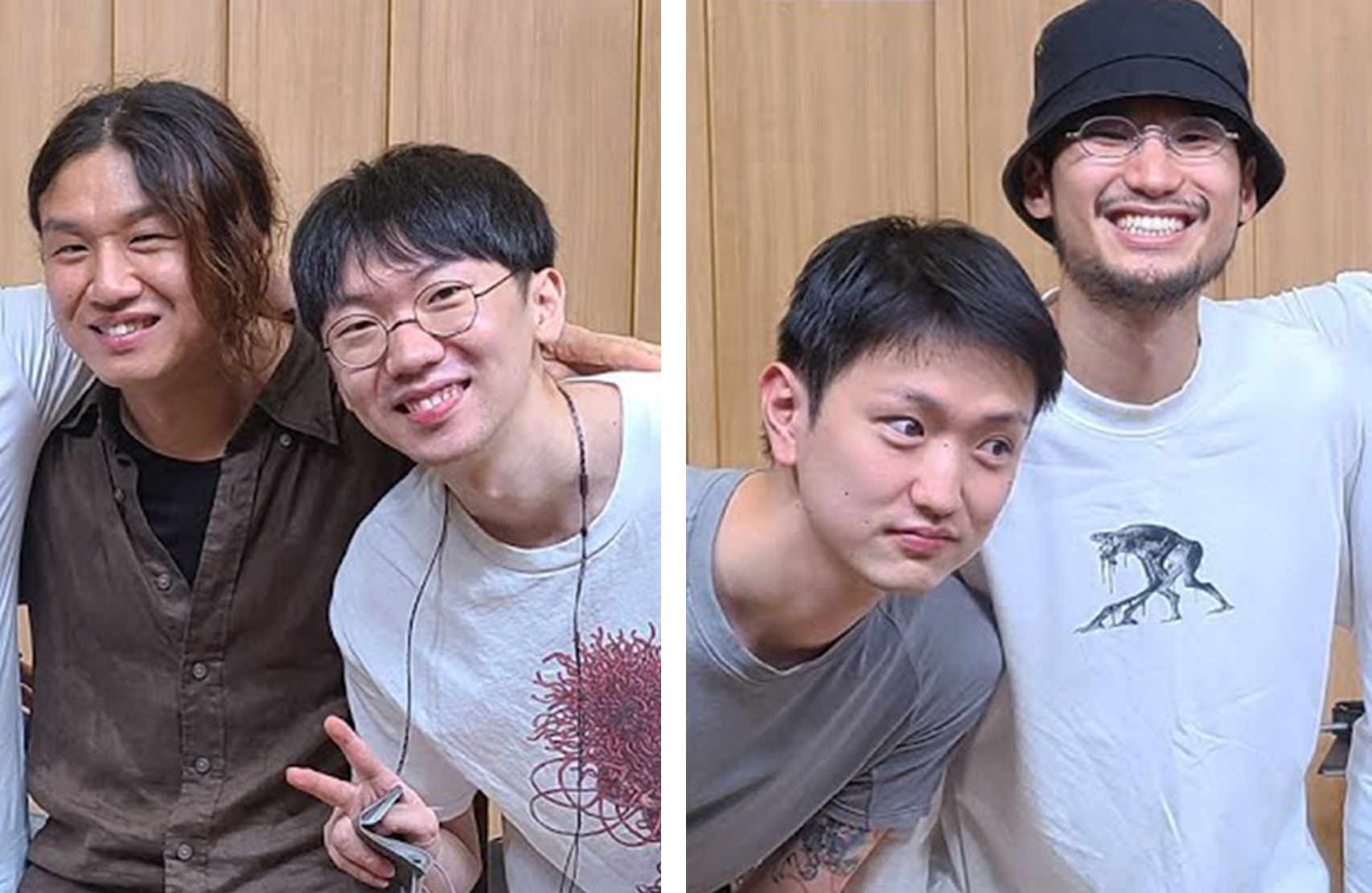
- Silica Gel in 2022; From left to right: Geon-jay, Chunchu, Han-joo, Choi Woong-hee

Background information
- Origin: Ansan, South Korea
- Genres: Indie rock; psychedelic rock; neo-psychedelia; art rock; indietronica; noise pop
- Years active: 2013–present
- Labels: CAM; BGBG Records; Magic Strawberry Sound
- Members: Kim Geon-jay; Kim Min-su (Chunchu); Kim Han-joo; Choi Woong-hee
- Past members: Koo Kyung-mo; Kang Dong-hwa; Lee Dae-hee; Kim Min-young

Silica Gel (Korean: 실리카겔) is a South Korean indie rock band, formed in Ansan in 2013 and based in Seoul. The band currently comprises Kim Han-joo (vocalist and keyboardist), Kim Geon-jay (drummer), Kim "Chunchu" Min-su (guitarist and vocalist), and Choi Woong-hee (bassist). The band's members chose the name after noticing silica gel in their gum container before the 2013 Pyeongchang Biennale Art Festival.

Since their formation, the band has released three studio albums: Silica Gel (2016), Power Andre 99 (2023) and Ballad of You (2026). At the Korean Music Awards, they won Rookie of the Year in 2017, Best Modern Rock Song in 2022 and 2023, and Musician of the Year in 2024.

Kim Min-su (Chunchu) also has a solo music career under the name Noridogam, Kim Han-joo is a producer and has already worked with artists such as Balming Tiger and RM, and Geon-jay is a member of the experimental trio SETSETSET, a band which specializes in percussion music.

In an interview for their third studio album Ballad of You, Han-joo named Dave Fridmann, BJ Burton and Joe Zawinul as his main inspirations, Geon-jay mentioned King Gizzard & The Lizard Wizard were the ones he used as references, while Woong-hee remarked Tame Impala and MGMT were "like the Bible to me".

== Career ==
=== 2013–2017: Formation, Silica Gel, EPs ===
Silica Gel was formed in 2013 by eight students from Seoul Institute of the Arts in Ansan. Originally, they received attention for their initial style of combining band music with VJing.

In 2015, they released their first EP, Pure Sun, and in 2016 they released their debut studio album, the self-titled Silica Gel. Between 2016 and 2018, the band won the EBS Hello Rookie Contest Grand Prize and Best New Artist of the Year at the Korean Music Awards.

In 2017, they released a single, "Space Angel", a collaboration with South Korean band Parasol. In November, they released the EP SiO2.nH2O.

=== 2018–2021: Hiatus, lineup changes, singles ===
From 2018 to 2020, the band went on a 2-year hiatus while members performed their mandatory military service. Kim Han-joo said they spent this period seeking ways to improve the band's potential. During the hiatus, bassist Koo Kyung-mo left the band permanently.

Silica Gel returned as a 4-member group in 2020, starting with their single "Kyo181". Their 2021 single "Desert Eagle" won Best Modern Rock Song at the 19th Korean Music Awards.

On the 16th of November of 2020, Silica Gel performed for the first time under their concert series Syn.THE.Size, a play on the word synthesize. However, the first edition, titled Syn.THE.Size #1, was a notable exception due to it being a livestream instead of a proper venue, and also the only one that featured opening acts, those being the korean hip-hop duo Y2k92 and singer-songwriter So!YoON!.

=== 2022–2024: Power Andre 99, concert film, festivals ===
In March 2022, Silica Gel had the second edition of their show series titled Syn.THE.Size at the Nodeul Island Live House. In August 2022, they released their single "No Pain", which became a breakthrough song on the South Korean charts. "No Pain" won the award for Best Modern Rock Song at the 20th Korean Music Awards.

In April 2023, they released the EP Machine Boy. They performed at various rock festivals throughout the year, including Pentaport Rock Festival and the DMZ Peace Train Music Festival. They released the single "Tik Tak Tok" (틱택톡) with So!YoON! in August. On 20 December 2023, more than 7 years after their previous album, Silica Gel released their second studio album Power Andre 99. In 2024, a concert film, also named Power Andre 99, documented a live performance of the album at the Blue Square Mastercard Hall in Yongsan. The film had its theatrical debut on June 26 across 29 CGV theaters and offered meet and greets between fans and the band members, along with promotional A3 posters for those who attended.

In February 2024, the band won Musician of the Year at the 21st Korean Music Awards. Throughout 2024, they performed at Primavera Sound 2024 in Spain, Vivid Sydney in Australia, Festival Les Escales in France, and also had their third solo show titled Syn.THE.Size Ⅲ. On July 26, Silica Gel were the opening support act for Noel Gallagher's High Flying Birds during the South Korean leg of their tour. On October 4, the band performed at the Busan International Rock Festival and unveiled new sound equipment for future tours.

On May 28, the band released a cover of "Lost!" by RM. The original song was included in RM's second solo album Right Place, Wrong Person in which production contributions were made by Kim Han-joo. On 1 July, upon expiry of their contract, Silica Gel left the record label Magic Strawberry Sound after 4 years with the company. They had released Power Andre 99 and Machine Boy through the label.

In November, the group won Best Asian Creative Artist at the 15th Golden Indie Music Awards in Taiwan. In December, the band held a free concert with tickets distributed through a lottery system at the KT&G SangSang Madang in Hongdae. Over 50,000 people registered for the lottery.

=== 2025–present: Ballad of You, awards, touring ===
In February 2025, Power Andre 99 received three nominations at the 22nd Korean Music Awards for Album of the Year, Musician of the Year, and Best Modern Rock Album.

On 9 June 2025, the band were announced as headliners for the Asian Pop Festival in Incheon. On 2 July, Spotify hosted Speakeasy Live, a mystery concert in Seonsu-dong that promoted a surprise artist and sold tickets through a lottery system. On the day of the concert, the artist was revealed to be Silica Gel, who performed in an intimate setting and previewed their upcoming single "NamgungFefere" (南宮Fefere), which featured Japanese Breakfast. On 10 July, NamgungFefere was released on streaming platforms. On August 30th and 31st, they had the fourth edition of their solo concert, Syn.THE.Size X, which expanded the series to a tour by including shows in Tokyo and Osaka. The "X" in the title is a nod to the 10th anniversary of the band's debut with the EP Pure Sun.

On 11 December 2025, the band released the single "BIG VOID", a track which marked the beginning of a transition for Silica Gel, moving away from the heavy and metallic sound they were known for since Power Andre 99 and introducing more experimental arrangements and a more colourful, psychedelic energy. On 15 and 29 December, they performed on THE FIRST TAKE's F/T Songs No.620 and No.625.

In May 2026, they made a cryptic post on social media revealing two of their projects' release dates, that being Ballad of You and its single, "Molecular Gastronomy", though the names were only announced later on. On 21 May 2026, the band announced the new entry to their tour series, Syn.THE.Size: Ballad of You. The tour will promote their album Ballad of You and once again expanded the series, now including venues at major Asian cities such as Hong Kong, Kuala Lumpur, Taipei, Bangkok and Singapore.

On 30 June 2026, they released the single "Molecular Gastronomy", and on 17 July, Silica Gel performed on Tatsuya Kitani's Hugs Vol.6, a self-organised joint concert, alongside Amazarashi and Tatsuya Kitani himself.

On 2 August 2026 they performed at Incheon Pentaport Rock Festival, where they previewed "Crybaby" and "Melatonin 88mg". On 9 August, the band performed a set at Apple Myeongdong, previewing another song from their upcoming album, "Accident", as well as getting their own curated playlist on Apple Music. On 20 August, Ballad of You was officially released, receiving critical acclaim. The album was heavily inspired by Ozamu Tezuka's unfinished manga series Phoenix, as well as Haruomi Hosono's eighth solo studio album S-F-X.

== Band members ==
=== Current ===
- Kim Han-joo – lead vocals, keyboards, piano, rhythm guitar (2013–present)
- Kim Min-su (known as "Chunchu") – lead guitar, vocals (2013–present)
- Kim Geon-jay – drums, percussion (2013–present)
- Choi Woong-hee – bass guitar (2018–present)

=== Former ===
- Koo Kyung-mo – bass guitar (2013–2018)
- Kang Dong-hwa – VJ (2013–2016)
- Lee Dae-hee – VJ (2013–2018)
- Kim Min-young – VJ (2013–2018)

== Discography ==
=== Studio albums ===
- Silica Gel (실리카겔) (2016)
- POWER ANDRE 99 (2023)
- Ballad of You (2026)

=== Extended plays ===
- Pure Sun (새삼스레 들이켜본 무중력 사슴의 다섯가지 시각) (2015)
- SiO2.nH2O (2017)
- Machine Boy (2023)

=== Singles ===
- "Two Moons" (두 개의 달) (2016)
- "sister" (2016)
- "Space Angel" (2017)
- "Kyo181" (2020)
- "Hibernation" (2021)
- "S G T A P E - 01" (2021)
- "Desert Eagle" (2022)
- "I'MMORTAL" (2022)
- "No Pain" (2022)
- "Mercurial" (2023)
- "Tik Tak Tok" (2023)
- "S G T A P E - 02" (2024)
- "Namgung FEFERE" (南宮FEFERE) (2025)
- "BIG VOID" (2025)
- "S G T A P E - 03" (2026)
- "Molecular Gastronomy" (2026)

== Awards and nominations ==
Award	Year	Category	Nominee / Nominated work	Result	Ref.
Korean Music Awards	2017	Best New Artist	Silica Gel	Won	
Korean Music Awards	2017	Best Modern Rock Album	Silica Gel	Nominated	
Korean Music Awards	2022	Best Modern Rock Song	"Desert Eagle"	Won	
Korean Music Awards	2023	Best Modern Rock Song	"No Pain"	Won	
Korean Music Awards	2023	Song of the Year	"No Pain"	Nominated	
Korean Music Awards	2024	Musician of the Year	Silica Gel	Won	
Korean Music Awards	2024	Best Modern Rock Album	Machine Boy	Won	
Korean Music Awards	2024	Album of the Year	Machine Boy	Nominated	
Korean Music Awards	2024	Best Modern Rock Song	"Tik Tak Tok" (featuring So!YoON!)	Won	
Korean Music Awards	2024	Song of the Year	"Tik Tak Tok" (featuring So!YoON!)	Nominated	
Korean Music Awards	2025	Album of the Year	Power Andre 99	Nominated	
Korean Music Awards	2025	Best Modern Rock Album	Power Andre 99	Nominated	
Korean Music Awards	2025	Musician of the Year	Silica Gel	Nominated	
Golden Indie Music Awards	2024	Best Asian Creative Artist	Silica Gel	Won	
Korea Popular Culture and Arts Awards	2024	Minister of Culture, Sports and Tourism Commendation	Silica Gel	Won	
Melon Music Awards	2023	Best Music Style	"Tik Tak Tok" (featuring So!YoON!)	Won	
