= 0.1 Flaws and All =

Studio album by Wave to Earth
- Released: April 20, 2023
- Genre: Indie rock
- Length: 53:25
- Label: Wavy
- Producer: Kim Daniel

Wave to Earth chronology
Summer Flows 0.02 (2020)	0.1 Flaws and All (2023)	Play with Earth! 0.03 (2024)

Singles from 0.1 Flaws and All
- 1. "Nouvelle Vague" Released: November 24, 2021; 2. "Calla" Released: June 8, 2022; 3. "Dried Flower" Released: October 11, 2022

0.1 Flaws and All. (stylized in all lowercase) is the debut studio album by the South Korean indie rock band Wave to Earth. The album was released on April 20, 2023.

== Background ==
0.1 Flaws and All is recorded with a bright pop sound on A side and a jazz sound on B side that drives its "dark atmosphere". Kim Daniel said in an interview: "I think everyone can be perfect when they acknowledge their flaws rather than ignore or hide them. I wanted to deliver this message."

== Track listing ==
Disc 1
No.	Title	Length
1.	"Bad"	4:23
2.	"Sunny Days"	4:08
3.	"Peach Eyes"	3:05
4.	"Evening Glow"	3:36
5.	"Pink Horizon"	0:59
6.	"Pink"	4:27
7.	"Calla"	4:19
8.	"Love." ("사랑으로")	5:07

Disc 2
No.	Title	Length
1.	"Homesick"	5:06
2.	"Dried Flower"	3:39
3.	"Sunburn"	3:32
4.	"Akira"	2:42
5.	"Nouvelle Vague"	3:49
6.	"So Real"	4:33

Notes

- All tracks are stylized in lowercase.

== Personnel ==
These credits were adapted from Melon.

=== Musicians ===
- Daniel Kim – guitar (tracks 1–11, 13, 14); synthesizers (tracks 1–9, 11, 12); piano (track 9); Rhodes (track 12); strings (track 5); songwriting (tracks 1–3, 6–14); lyrics (tracks 1, 2, 6–11, 13, 14)
- John Cha – bass (tracks 1–14); songwriting (tracks 3, 4); lyrics (tracks 3, 4)
- Dong Q – drums (tracks 1–14); piano (track 7)
- Jonggeun Cho – synthesizers (track 1); keys (track 6); piano (track 8); Rhodes (tracks 10, 11, 13, 14)
- Min Jeon – saxophone (tracks 6, 10, 11, 13, 14)
- Wave to Earth – songwriting (track 5); arrangement (tracks 1–14)

=== Technical ===
- Daniel Kim – production, recording, mixing (all tracks)
- John Cha – mastering (tracks 1, 3–14)
- Calbi / Fallone – mastering (track 2)
- Colde – executive production

== Charts ==
Weekly chart performance for 0.1 Flaws and All
Chart (2023)	Peak position
South Korean Albums (Circle Chart)	20
