= TRPP (band) =

South Korean indie rock band

- Origin: Seoul, South Korea
- Genres: Shoegaze; dream pop
- Years active: 2021-present
- Labels: Magic Strawberry Sound
- Members: Chi Chi Cliché; Furukawa Yukio; Elephant 999

TRPP is a South Korean shoegaze band. The band was formed by singer-songwriter Yoon Jiyoung, Kang Wonwoo of IlloYlo, and Jeong Bonggil of Bye Bye Badman using their pseudonyms Chi Chi Cliché, Furukawa Yukio and Elephant 999. Since their formation in 2021, the band has released two studio albums: TRPP (2021) and Here to Stay (2022).

== History ==
The TRPP was formed in 2021. According to their interviews, the band's members consisted of Chi Chi Cliché (Korean: 치치 클리셰, a Chinese-French woman who settled in South Korea), Furukawa Yukio (Korean: 후루가와 유키오, a Japanese man who runs a ramen restaurant), and Elephant 999 (Korean: 엘리펀트 99, a man of unknown nationality who even forgot his name). But they are actually a band formed by singer-songwriter Yoon Jiyoung, Kang Wonwoo of IlloYlo, and Jeong Bonggil of Bye Bye Badman, creating a fictional universe. They released their single Pause in May 2021, and their first studio album TRPP in July. They released the OST track of the South Korean television series Inspector Koo.

In May 2022, they appeared on The EBS space with shoegaze band FOG. They released their second studio album Here to Stay on 17 September 2022. Son Minhyeon of IZM described the band as "In the process of accidental encounters leading to new discoveries, TRPP is an interesting serendipity in themselves." during a review of the album. The album was nominated for best modern rock album at the 2023 Korean Music Awards.

== Discography ==
=== Studio albums ===
- TRPP (2021)
- Here to Stay (2022)
