= Se So Neon =

South Korean indie rock band

Se So Neon 새소년
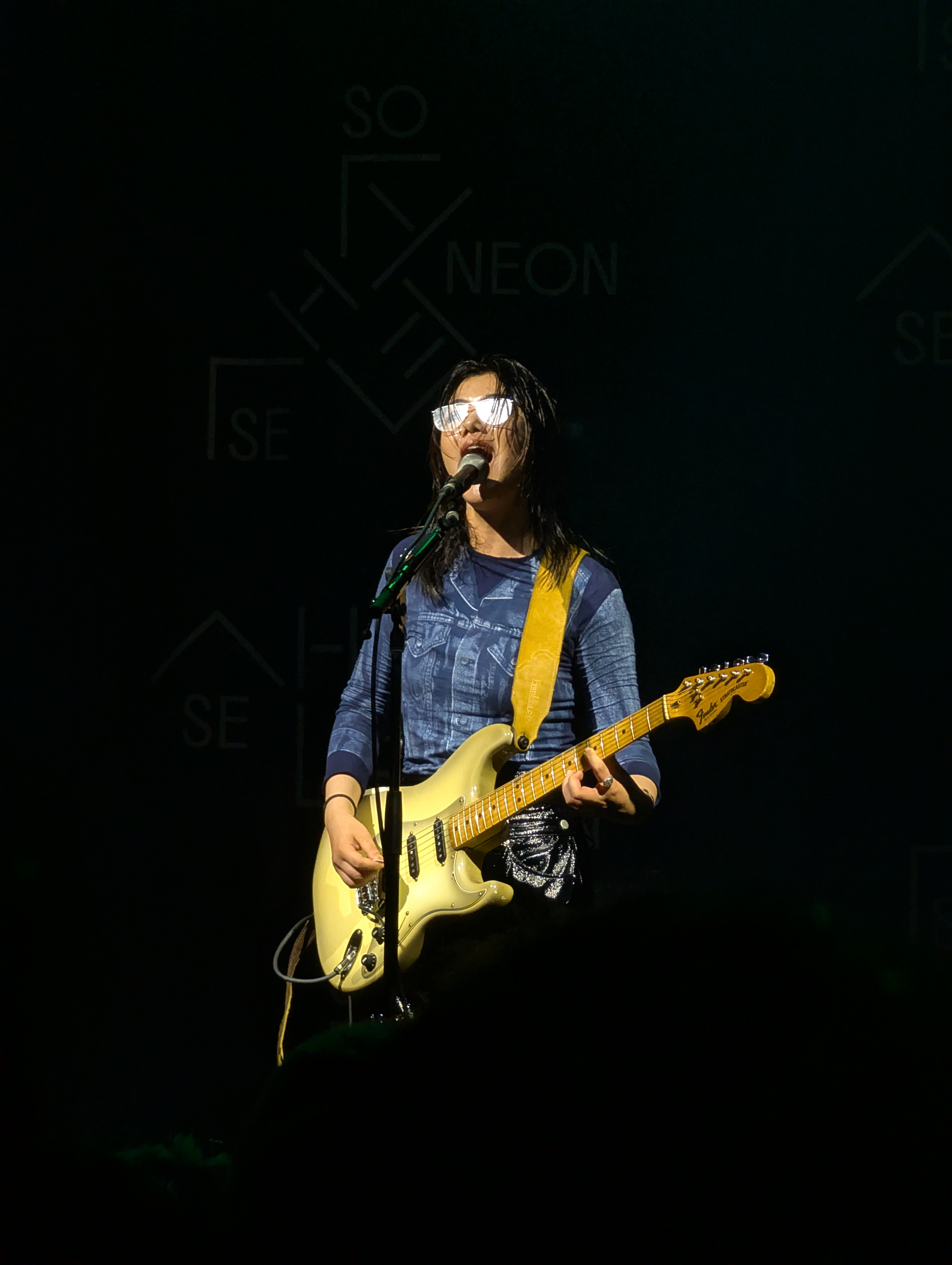
- Se So Neon performing at The Regency Ballroom on 9-23-2025

Background information
- Origin: Seoul, South Korea
- Genres: Indie rock; psychedelic rock
- Years active: 2016-present
- Labels: AWAL; BGBG Records; Magic Strawberry Sound
- Members: Hwang So-yoon
- Past members: Park Hyun-jin; Fancy Moon; Gangto; U-su

Se So Neon (Korean: 새소년; RR: Saesonyeon; pronounced [sɛ.so.njʌn]; commonly stylized in all caps) is a South Korean indie rock band. The band currently consists of lead vocalist and guitarist Hwang So-yoon. Since its formation in 2016, the band has released the album Now (2025), and EPs Summer Plumage (2017) and Nonadaptation (2020). In 2018, the band won the awards for Rookie of the Year and Best Rock Song at the Korean Music Awards.

== History ==
=== 2016–2018: Formation, awards and Summer Plumage ===
Se So Neon was established in 2016 and began as a project band between Hwang So-yoon and Gangto. Their name translates to 'new kids' or 'new boys', and was chosen by Hwang after coming across an issue of the now-defunct children's magazine Sae So Nyeon in a bookstore. Shortly after formation, the band recruited bassist Fancy Moon to become a trio.

In October 2017, the band released its first EP여름깃 (Summer Plumage) through BGBG Records. The EP went on to be nominated for Best Rock Album at the Korean Music Awards, while its lead single "The Wave" won an award for Best Rock Song. During the ceremony, Se So Neon also won the award for Rookie of the Year.

In December 2018, Se So Neon announced Gangto and Fancy Moon had left the band to perform their military service. They were replaced by Park Hyun-jin on bass and U-su on drums, who were recruited by Hwang through a self-tape audition.

=== 2019–2024: Nonadaptation and lineup changes ===
In 2020, Se So Neon were named Fender's Global Artist of the Year. In 2021, the group were the only Korean act to be included in YouTube Music's global foundry program.

In February 2020, Se So Neon released its second EP Nonadaptation under Magic Strawberry Sound. The EP received a nomination for Best Rock Album at the Korean Music Awards, along with a Best Rock Song nomination for its lead single "Go Back".

In February 2021, the band released the single "Jayu". It was followed by more singles such as "Joke" and "Kidd".

In August 2022, the band announced the departure of U-su, citing his wish to continue activities as a solo drummer.

In 2023, Se So Neon's performance at Sungkyunkwan University was boycotted by students after social media comments by Hwang surfaced online. Hwang had previously publicly responded to the Nth Room scandal in 2020 by sharing an op-ed which criticized South Korean society for downplaying sexual exploitation and due to the high number of members in the Telegram chats, called for all men to be treated as potential criminals.

In 2024, Se So Neon performed at SXSW despite a boycott over the festival's sponsorship by the United States Department of Defense. Two days after the performance, the band released an apology expressing their regret, citing ignorance due the lack of Gaza-related coverage in South Korean media and extending condolences to civilians affected by Israel's invasion of Palestine.

=== 2025–present: Transition to solo project and debut album Now ===
In February 2025, the band announced the departure of bassist Park Hyun-jin, leaving Hwang So-yoon as the only remaining active member.

On May 16, 2025, Se So Neon released their first single as a solo project featuring a music video self-directed by Hwang. The song, titled "Twit Winter", is co-produced by Hwang and Kenny Gilmore, and mixed by Nathan Boddy. On May 19, the band announced a North American tour that would take place later in that year to promote an upcoming album.

On June 19, the band released the second single "Remember!" and officially revealed their debut studio album Now, which is scheduled for release on August 15, 2025. The album will include 12 tracks, including the previously released singles "Jayu" and "Kidd", along with new songs such as "Secret Police", "Small Heart", and "3Revolution".

On July 18, the third single "New Romantic" was released, alongside an English version of the song. Similarly, the band had previously included English versions for the singles "Twit Winter" and "Remember". The same day, the band announced they would be performing at the Yebisu Brewery's Garden Hall in Tokyo to promote the album's release, as well as appearing as headliners at the 2025 Setouchi Triennale music festival.

On August 15, the band's debut album Now was released.

== Members ==
Current members

- Hwang So-yoon – lead vocals, guitar (2016–present)
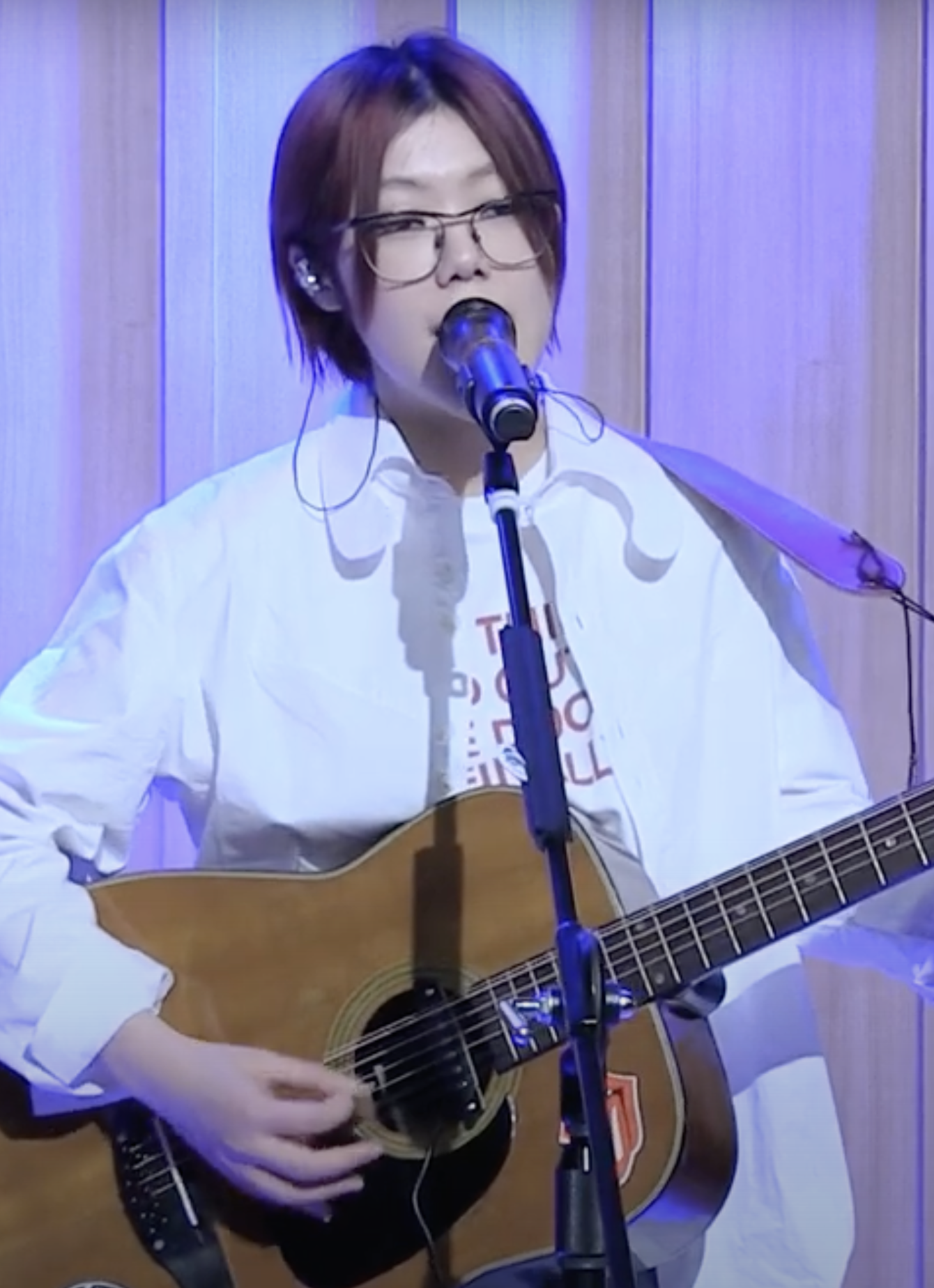
  Se So Neon performing in 2021

Former members

- Park Hyun-jin – bass guitar, backing and occasional lead vocals (2018–2025)
- U-su – drums, percussion, backing vocals (2018–2022)
- Gangto – drums, percussion (2016–2018)
- Fancy Moon – bass guitar (2016–2018)

== Discography ==
=== Albums ===
Title	Album details	Peak chart positions	Sales
Now	Released: 15 August 2025; Label: AWAL; Formats: LP, Digital download	—N/a	—N/a

=== Extended plays ===
Title	Album details	Peak chart positions	Sales
Title	Album details	KOR	Sales
Summer Plumage (여름깃)	Released: 26 October 2017; Label: BGBG Records; Formats: LP, CD, Digital download	57	—N/a
Nonadaptation (비적응)	Released: 18 February 2020; Label: Magic Strawberry Sound; Formats: CD, Digital download	13	—N/a

=== Singles ===
Title	Release details	Album
"Long Dream" (긴 꿈)	Released: 20 June 2017; Label: BGBG Records; Formats: LP, CD, digital download, streaming	Summer Plumage
"The Wave" (파도)	Released: 26 September 2017; Label: BGBG Records; Formats: Digital download, streaming	Summer Plumage
"Go Back" (집에)	Released: 4 October 2019; Label: BGBG Records, Magic Strawberry Sound; Formats: Digital download, streaming	Nonadaptation
"Cat (Digging Club Seoul Version)"	Released: 10 December 2019; Label: Magic Strawberry Sound; Formats: Digital download, streaming	Non-album single
"Nan Chun" (난춘)	Released: 10 May 2020; Label: Magic Strawberry Sound; Formats: Digital download, streaming	Non-album single
"Jayu" (자유)	Released: 5 February 2021; Label: Magic Strawberry Sound; Formats: Digital download, streaming	Now
"Joke" (joke!)	Released: 23 November 2021; Label: Magic Strawberry Sound; Formats: Digital download, streaming	Non-album single
"Kidd"	Released: 27 July 2023; Label: Magic Strawberry Sound; Formats: Digital download, streaming	Now
"Twit Winter"	Released: 16 May 2025; Label: AWAL; Formats: Digital download, streaming	Now
"Remember!"	Released: 19 June 2025; Label: AWAL; Formats: Digital download, streaming	Now
"New Romantic"	Released: 18 July 2025; Label: AWAL; Formats: Digital download, streaming	Now

== Awards and accolades ==
Awards and nominations
Year	Award	Category	Nominee	Result	Ref.
2016	Shinhan Card Rookie Project	—N/a	Se So Neon	Silver	
2018	Korean Music Awards	Rookie of the Year	Se So Neon	Won	
2018	Korean Music Awards	Best Rock Song	"The Wave" (파도)	Won	
2018	Korean Music Awards	Best Rock Album	Summer Plumage	Nominated	
2020	Korean Music Awards	Best Rock Song	"Go Back" (집에)	Nominated	
2021	Korean Music Awards	Best Rock Album	Nonadaptation	Nominated	
2021	Korean Music Awards	Best Rock Song	"Nan Chun" (난춘)	Nominated	

Year-end lists
Publication	List	Work	Ref.
Pitchfork	The 35 Best Rock Albums of 2020	Nonadaptation	
Paste	The 40 Best Rock Albums of 2020	Nonadaptation	
