= Nth Room case =

2020 criminal child pornography and sexual blackmail case in South Korea

The "Nth Room" case (Korean: n번방 사건) is a criminal case involving blackmail, cybersex trafficking, child pornography, and the spread of sexually exploitative videos via the Telegram app between 2018 and 2020 in South Korea. A man nicknamed god god (later identified as Moon Hyung-wook, 문형욱) sold sexual exploitation videos on Telegram channels and groups.

A copycat crime, known as the "Doctor's Room", (박사방; 博士房; baksabang) was operated by a man using the screen name Doctor (박사; Baksa, later identified as Cho Ju-bin), who is accused of blackmailing dozens of women, forcing them to take sexually exploitative videos, with some involving rape.

The number of confirmed victims is at least 103, including 26 minors. It was revealed that the victims' pictures were shared and sold to over 260,000 IDs (narrowed down to about 60,000 users, taking into consideration overlapping profiles) and were paid for anonymously in cryptocurrency.

A Netflix documentary about the case, entitled Cyber Hell: Exposing An Internet Horror, was released in 2022. In 2021, the press stated that the accounts on many platforms were not real. From 2021 to 2024, the site named 'nth room' was closed 5 times.

== Cases ==
=== "Nth Room" ===
A user nicknamed "God God", who was later identified as Moon Hyung-Wook, created eight groups simply named after their ordinal numeral (hence the name "Nth Room"), and uploaded sexually exploitative pornography. Another user nicknamed "Watchman" advertised the link to these groups in another Telegram group named "Godam Room".

=== Doctor's Room ===
A user nicknamed "Doctor" (later identified as Cho Ju-bin) posted part-time job offerings on Twitter, seeking to gather personal information from women and girls who answered the offers. In the "Doctor's Room", the sexually exploitative pornography was distributed via a Telegram chatroom and was only accessible via a cryptocurrency payment. "Doctor", who appeared in July 2019, coerced women to appear in pictures and videos, then uploaded the content. When reports first emerged, personal information of the reporter was found and released. In addition, a high school student in Incheon was running various Telegram chatting rooms that distributed child abuse and sexual assault towards children, links for buying drugs and also shared tricks on how to deal with police investigations.

== Reports and investigation ==
Reports of such illegal content being shared on Telegram were appearing throughout 2019. For instance, the Seoul Shinmun, through undercover journalism, found a secret Telegram room distributing child abuse and sexual assault towards children in January. In the same manner, Sisa Journal in April that year reported that Telegram was being used as a platform for sharing illegal pictures and videos.

In the beginning, when the case became known on male-dominated online communities, a man reported the "Nth Room" case by contacting 112. The police, however, did not consider the report credible and ignored it. The first known people to investigate the Nth room case were two female university students in July 2019, going by the team name of Team Flame. On August 12, the Electronic Times was the first media outlet to report on the case. The case went on to have a huge social impact and ignite public fury.

The lead operator Baksa was arrested, but his accomplice and Telegram users who shared the videos for money remain unknown. While police got the list of people who bought the videos and were investigating, over five million people signed a national petition demanding public disclosure of the identities of users who shared in the chatroom. The number of members in Doctor's Room, including all paid and free users, was confirmed to be 15,000.

On March 25, 2020, Korean virtual and cryptocurrency operators agreed to cooperate with authorities on this case after concluding that the leaders and subscribers of the Nth Room paid with virtual currency. By April 27, almost 40 people were identified through tracing cryptocurrency transfers.

== Suspects ==
Nth room case diagram
Nth Room				Doctor's Room
Moon ("God God")	→	Shin ("Kelly")	←	Cho ("Doctor"); Kang ("Butta"); Lee ("Ikiya")
Moon ("God God")	transferred to	Shin ("Kelly")	modeled after	Cho ("Doctor"); Kang ("Butta"); Lee ("Ikiya")
↑ modeled after		↑ promoted		Cho ("Doctor"); Kang ("Butta"); Lee ("Ikiya")
Second Nth Room		Godam Room		Cho ("Doctor"); Kang ("Butta"); Lee ("Ikiya")
Bae ("Loli Daejang Taebeom")		Jeon ("Watchman")		Cho ("Doctor"); Kang ("Butta"); Lee ("Ikiya")

On March 23, 2020, the Seoul Broadcasting System disclosed the identity of the "Doctor's Room" suspect Cho Ju-bin. On March 24, following a decision of the Personal Information Disclosure Review Committee of the Seoul Metropolitan Police Agency, an official identity disclosure measure was taken, based on Article 25 of the Act on Special Cases Concerning the Punishment of Sexual Crimes. This was the first case where an official identity disclosure measure had been taken for a sexual criminal. An accomplice of Cho, Nam Kyung-eup (남경읍), was revealed on July 15, 2021.

Meanwhile, the user with the nickname "Watchman" who was known as the mastermind and the individual who made the "Nth Room" popular was arrested in September 2019. He was revealed as Jeon, a 38-year-old company worker, who had received a suspended sentence for pornography distribution in the past. Jeon was indicted on suspicion of operating an Internet site featuring illegal recordings and sentenced to an imprisonment of 3 years and 6 months by the prosecution. However, since it was revealed during the trial that there was a connection with the "Nth Room", an application is underway for the resumption of the hearings.

Shin, the prior operator of "Nth Room" who had inherited it from "God God", was a man in his 30s who had previously received a suspended sentence for violating the Act on the Protection of Children and Youth Against Sex Offenses, and was taken into police custody in September 2019. He received a sentence of one-year imprisonment in the first hearing, and since the prosecution did not appeal, it is foreseen that this sentence will become final in the second hearing.

God God claimed he could not be caught according to information released to JTBC News. He claimed he never used his own phone and all currency was transferred through gift vouchers so it cannot be traced. He also revealed he was confident that if he abandoned his phone, there would be no evidence against him even if he turned himself in.

Moon Hyung-wook (문형욱), nicknamed God God, was arrested and charged in May, and detained on May 12, 2020. His personal information was released on May 13. In April 2021, Moon Hyung-wook was sentenced to 34 years in prison. An accomplice to Moon, Ahn Seung-jin (안승진), was revealed June 22, 2020.

On November 26, 2020, Cho was sentenced to 40 years in prison.

== Domestic reactions ==
Lee In-young, the parliamentary leader of the ruling Democratic Party of Korea, promised the party will bring the case to parliament. The main opposition United Future Party condemned the case, in which they said that they will forward the case to parliament to prohibit any kind of child pornography. The party also urged the Democratic Party to not just focus on the upcoming general election but to also cooperate with them to forward their bill. Its chairman, Hwang Kyo-ahn, however, created controversy by saying not all suspects involved in the case deserved the same punishment.

The Supreme Court of South Korea also announced its plans to make sentences harsher on digital sex crimes following public outcry.

== Prevention law of Nth room ==
=== Revision of the Sexual Violence Punishment law ===
Before the revision, only the distribution, sale, lease, and provision of illegal photographs were subject to punishment; the current law added regulations that also sentenced those who possess, purchase, store, and watch illegal sexual photographs up to three years in prison or fined up to 30 million won. Even if the video was filmed by one's self, the law clarified the rule that if someone spreads it against their own will, the disseminator would be punished and the sentence will be raised.

A new rule implemented a prison sentence of more than one year and three years respectively, on those who threaten or coerce using photographs that can cause sexual shame. This act is most commonly known as blackmail.

In the case of special robbery and rape, a person could be sentenced to up to three years in prison for preliminary and conspiracy charges; the legal sentence for illegal filming and production was further strengthened.

=== Revision of criminal law ===
The age for rape of minors was raised from 13 to 16. Rape in Korea is not defined by consent for any age range.

(1) A person who has sexual intercourse with or commits an indecent act on another who is under 13 years of age shall be punished under Article 297, 297-2, 298, 301, or 301-2. <Amended on Dec. 29, 1995; Dec. 18, 2012; May 19, 2020>

(2) A person 19 years of age or older who has sexual intercourse with or commits an indecent act on another who is 13 years of age or older but under 16 years of age shall be punished under Article 297, 297-2, 298, 301, or 301-2. <Newly Inserted on May 19, 2020>

Rape in Korea is defined per article 3297 of the criminal act is as follows: Article 297 of Criminal Act is the most basic form of a sex crime in Korean Law. According to Article 297, a person 1) by means of violence or intimidation 2) having sexual intercourse with 3) another consists of a crime “rape.”

As some perpetrators would not be sentenced because up to 70 victims' assaults and threats have not been proven to have led to actual crimes, they could also be sentenced to up to three years in prison for preliminary and conspiracy charges against those who planned rape and similar rape.

=== Hiding of crime profits ===
In the case of digital sexual violence crimes, the opinion that "it is not easy to prove the relevance between individual crimes and criminal profits, so it is difficult to withdraw criminal profits," eased the burden of proof.

=== Revision of the Youth Protection law ===
The children and adolescents who are subject to prostitution were identified as victims. Individuals who have committed simple sex crimes against children and adolescents as well as those who have committed simple sex crimes are subject to personal disclosure.

== National petition and government response ==
On March 26, the Ministry of Public Administration and Security's resident registration number change committee said it would submit an application for changing the resident registration number, which is recognized as a victim of the "N" incident, as an "emergency agenda" and process it as quickly as possible within three weeks. The original legal deadline is six months and usually takes three months.

=== Petition for international cooperation ===
On January 2, 2020, a new Cheong Wa Dae national petition was posted and 219,705 people signed the petition for an international cooperative investigation. As of March 1, National Police Agency Commissioner General Min Gap-ryong released a video clip and a full text of the answers to the petition.

=== National Assembly's petition ===
On January 15, 2020, 100,000 people agreed to the National Assembly's petition for international cooperation with police, the establishment of a digital sex crime department, raising sentencing standards for digital sex crimes, and the National Assembly's Legislation and Judiciary Committee on February 10. The result of the review, which was not to be referred to the plenary session (not to be referred to the plenary session), was because the purpose of the petition was reflected in the "Partial Amendment of the Act on the Punishment of Sexual Violence Crimes", which was passed by the First Subcommittee on the Legislation and Judiciary Committee's on March 3, 2020. However, it was criticized for being hasty. According to the Project ReSET, the revised bill only covers the creation and distribution of the so-called deepfake, and "does not reflect the strengthening of the sentencing standards, improvement of the investigation system, or international announcement investigation." It has been revealed that despite the provision of related data books, the remarks made in the process have been controversial, with more than a month of information not being properly identified.

=== Petition for the disclosure of all key suspects and participants ===
A petition calling for the personal and photo line of the key suspect, "Dr. Doctor," was filed on March 18 in the Cheong Wa Dae National Petition, and a petition was filed on March 20 calling for the disclosure of all participants in the Telegram Secret Room. By March 24, more than 2.57 million and 1.85 million people participated, respectively. The doctor's request for personal disclosure and photo line received the most consent in the history of the petition.

On the afternoon of March 24, National Police Agency Commissioner General Min Gap-ryong and Gender Equality and Family Minister Lee Jung-ok responded to the petition, and promised to set up a special digital sex crime investigation headquarters and prepare digital sex crime sentencing standards.

== Gender relations ==
South Korean gender profiling led to the blackmailing of female individuals. For example, in regards to the "Nth room case", women wanting to become models are given job offers through social media, leading to them taking pornographic imagery of themselves. Users like Cho Joo-bin then blackmail these individuals threatening to release the content to their families.

== Sentencing ==
On November 26, 2020, Cho Joo-bin was found guilty of his crimes and sentenced to a total of 40 years' imprisonment. Cho reportedly said that he wanted to apologize to his victims. The sentence was upgraded to 42 years in prison in October 2021, according to the Netflix documentary Cyber Hell: Exposing an Internet Horror.

Additionally, the documentary reported that Moon Hyeong-Wook was sentenced to 34 years in prison in November 2021. It also reported that by collaborating with cryptocurrency companies, 3,757 people linked to the Nth Room crimes have been arrested as of December 2020, of whom 245 have been imprisoned.

== See also ==
- List of sexual abuses perpetrated by groups
- Child grooming
- Intimidation
- Sex trafficking in South Korea
