= Magic Strawberry Sound =

South Korean independent label

- Founded: 2008
- Founder: Kim Hyeong-soo
- Distributor: Mount Media
- Genre: Rock music, independent music
- Country of origin: South Korea
- Location: Seoul, South Korea
- Official website: msbsound.com

Magic Strawberry Sound is an independent record label based in Seoul, South Korea. The label was founded by Kim Hyeong-soo in 2008, and he is a musician who works under the name Oldfish. In 2017, the label founded its sub-label, Peaches Label, and in 2018, BGBG records became an affiliated label.

== Artists ==
- Ahn Da-young
- Cheeze
- Ha Sangwook
- KONA
- Marrakech
- So Soo Bin
- yebit
- Soyou

== Former artists ==
- 10cm
- Bye Bye Badman
- Choi Jungyoon
- Cho Joonhee
- Humbert
- Jeong Chasik
- Kim Suyoung
- Kuonechan
- Minsu
- Lucite Tokki
- Parkmoonchi
- Playbook
- Rainbow 99
- Rooftop Moonlight
- SANAGO
- Sejin
- Se So Neon
- Silica Gel
- Song So-hee
- So!YoON!
- Sunwoo Jung-a
- TRPP
- Yoon Jiyoung
- Yozoh
- YUN DDan DDan
