= 19th Korean Music Awards =

2022 South Korean music awards ceremony

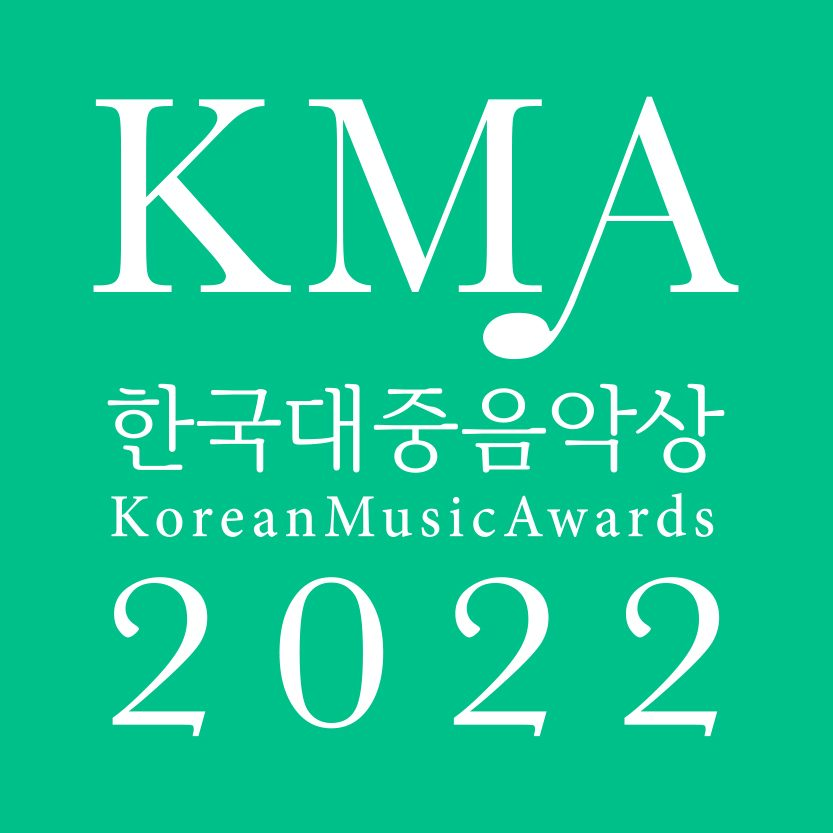
- Promotion poster
- Date: March 1, 2022
- Location: Nodeul Live House, Nodeulseom, Seoul, South Korea

Highlights
- Most awards: Aespa (3)
- Most nominations: Lang Lee (6)
- Website: koreanmusicawards.com

The 19th Korean Music Awards ceremony was held at Nodeul Live House, Nodeulseom, Seoul, on March 1, 2022, and was streamed online. It recognised the best music released in South Korea between December 2020 and November 2021. It was hosted by the Korean Music Awards Selection Committee and sponsored by the Ministry of Culture, Sports and Tourism and the Korea Creative Content Agency.

== Criteria ==
Unlike other South Korean music awards, the Korean Music Awards are based not on record sales but on musical achievement. The winners were determined by the Korean Music Awards Selection Committee, a panel composed of music critics, radio show producers, academics and other music industry professionals.

== Winners and nominees ==
The nominees for the 19th Korean Music Awards were announced on February 9, 2022. Folk singer Lang Lee was the most nominated artist with six nominations, followed by Aespa, IU and AKMU with four. BTS was nominated for the fifth consecutive year. For the first time, K-pop artists were nominated in independent categories, having previously been nominated in the pop and dance/electronic categories.

=== Main awards ===
Winners are listed first, highlighted in boldface, and indicated with a double dagger (‡). Nominees are listed in alphabetical order.

**Album of the Year**: **Lang Lee – There is a Wolf**‡; AKMU – Next Episode; Chun Yong-sung – Drowned; IU – Lilac; Kim Hyun-chul – City Breeze & Love Song	**Song of the Year**: **Aespa – "Next Level"**‡; AKMU – "Nakka" (with IU); BTS – "Butter"; Lang Lee – "There is a Wolf"; Lee Mu-jin – "Traffic Light"
**Musician of the Year**: **BTS**‡; IU; Kim Hyun-chul; Lang Lee; The Volunteers	**Rookie of the Year**: **Aespa**‡; Haepaary; Lee Mu-jin; Since; STAYC
**Best K-Pop Album**: **Chungha – Querencia**‡; Aespa – Savage; BoA – Better; CL – Alpha; Shinee – Atlantis	**Best K-Pop Song**: **Aespa – "Next Level"**‡; BTS – "Butter"; STAYC – "ASAP"; Tomorrow X Together – "0X1=Lovesong (I Know I Love You)"; Weeekly – "After School"
**Best Pop Album**: **IU – Lilac**‡; AKMU – Next Episode; eAeon – Fragile; Jeong Cha-sik – Night Driving; Kim Hyun-chul – City Breeze & Love Song	**Best Pop Song**: **AKMU – "Nakka" (with IU)**‡; IU – "Lilac"; Lee Mu-jin – "Traffic Light"; Lee Seung-hwan & Sunwoo Jung-a – "How Could You"; Wendy – "When This Rain Stops"
**Best Rock Album**: **Soumbalgwang – Happiness, Flower**‡; Atom Music Heart – Exile of iZm; Pakk – Chilgasal; Trap – Trap; Zeonpasa – Psyche of Eons	**Best Rock Song**: **Soumbalgwang – "Dance"**‡; Badlamb – "Noon Moment"; Trap – "One Corner"; Wabi King – "Rock & Roll Night" (featuring Shin Young); Zeonpasa – "Lie"
**Best Modern Rock Album**: **Wings of the Isang – The Borderline Between Hope and Despair**‡; Bosudong Cooler – Sand; Jannabi – The Land of Fantasy; The Volunteers – The Volunteers; Yang Chang-keun – Wave	**Best Modern Rock Song**: **Silica Gel – "Desert Eagle"**‡; Leaves Black – "Farewell, My Books!"; Meaningful Stone – "Dancing in the Rain"; The Volunteers – "Let Me Go!"; Wings of the Isang – "Twenty Years Old"
**Best Electronic Album**: **Haepaary – Born By Gorgeousness**‡; Haihm – Owhere; Joyul – Earwitness; Leesuho – Monika; Net Gala – Shinpa	**Best Electronic Song**: **Haepaary – "Go to GPD and Then"**‡; Doildoshi – "Forest Illumination"; Eobchae – "The Song of Hope"; Kirara – "HRT"; Moonsun – "Tom"
**Best Rap & Hip-Hop Album**: **Choi LB – Independent Music**‡; Changmo – Underground Rockstar; Los – Skandalouz; Mild Beats – Fragment; Unofficialboyy & Haifhaif – Net, Trap, Launcher, Capture	**Best Rap & Hip-Hop Song**: **Changmo – "Taiji"**‡; Bill Stax – "420 Flow" (featuring Lobonabeat); Don Mills – "Daebak Life" (featuring Northfacegawd, Uneducated Kid); Los – "Blue Lemonade" (featuring Hwaji); Since – "Spring Rain" (featuring Rakon)
**Best R&B & Soul Album**: **Thama – Don't Die Colors**‡; Dvwn – It's Not Your Fault; Jerd – A.M.P.; Mind Combined – Circle; Sogumm – Precious; Sumin & Slom – Miniseries	**Best R&B & Soul Song**: **Sumin & Slom – "The Gonlan Song"**‡; Hiko – "Time Goes By" (featuring George); Lee Hi – "H.S.K.T." (featuring Wonstein); Thama – "Blessed" (featuring G.Soul); Youra – "Mimi"
**Best Folk Album**: **Lang Lee – There is a Wolf**‡; Chun Yong-sung – Drowned; Jang Pill-soon – Petrichor; Jeon Ho-kwon – Cosmos; Lee Joo-young – Ballad	**Best Folk Song**: **Chun Yong-sung – "Barley Tea" (featuring Kang Mal-geum)**‡; Lang Lee – "There is a Wolf"; Jang Pill-soon – "Petrichor"; Lang Lee – "The Generation of Tribulation"; Lee Joo-young – "It's Snowing" (featuring Earip)
**Best Jazz Album**: **Jihye Lee Orchestra – Daring Mind**‡; Lee Jiyeun Jazz Orchestra – Blue Flower; Nam Yoo-sun – Things We Lost & Found; SB Circle – Pseudoscience; Yongseok Lee – The New Old One	**Best Jazz Vocal Album**: **Maria Kim – With Strings: Dream of You**‡; Bu-young Lee – Love, Like A Song; Golden Swing Band – Golden Rules; Kim Ju-hwan – My Funny Valentine: Kim Ju-hwan Sings Richard Rodgers Songbook; Korea Jazz Guardians – We All Started in Jazz Club
**Best Metal & Hardcore Album**: **Agnes – Hegemony Shift**‡; Ambroxiak – Detritus of Elysian Creation; Crux – Who Defines What's Divine; Hammering – Libera Me; Slant – 1st Album; Spit On My Tomb – Necrosis

=== Special awards ===
- Achievement Award – Devils
- Selection Committee Special Award – Han Kyung-rok, Korea Jazz Guard
