= Believe in the Moment =

Studio album by Onnine Ibalgwan
- Released: July 12, 2004
- Genre: Indie rock
- Length: 47:55
- Label: EMI

Onnine Ibalgwan chronology
Pop Song of the Dream (2002)	Believe in the Moment (2004)	Most Ordinary Existence (2008)

Believe in the Moment (Korean: 순간을 믿어요; RR: Soonganeul miteoyo) is the fourth studio album by South Korean indie rock band Onnine Ibalgwan. The album was released on 12 July 2004.

== Background ==
After the release of his third album Pop Song of the Dream, the band's bassist Lee Sangmoon died of a Wilson's disease, and vocalist Lee Seokwon divorced. Among the tracks on the album, Days in Heaven (천국의 나날들) is a track in memory of Lee Sangmoon, and Pop Song of the Dream (꿈의 팝송) is a song for Lee Seokwon's ex-wife. They interviewed about the album as "In this album Believe in the Moment, we have completely broken the principle of unity."

== Critical reception ==
Professional ratings
Review scores
Source	Rating
Music Y	4.5/5 stars
Weiv	6/10

Lee Minhee of IZM reviewed "They do not lose their pride, believe in the moment as they say, and go on a new trip in search of more partners with their personalities different from the vitality of the main stream, and with their skills that they have honed over a long time." Jeong Byeongwook of Music Y described "Believe in the Moment contains a story about a break-up that is probably more honest than the sixth album People Who Stay Alone, that was prepared for the last. They have always lived with separation and solitude in their images, and their consistency deserves love." Kim Tae of Weiv said "If the music of Onnine ibalgwan has dealt with the unknowable emptiness and loss mainly through the wound of a broken heart, Believe the Moment is telling "realistic" stories facing clear objects."

== Track listing ==
No.	Title	Length
1.	"As the Wind Blows" ("바람이 부는대로")	4:11
2.	"Without Sun" ("태양 없이")	5:08
3.	"Three Four" ("셋넷")	2:55
4.	"Pop Song of the Dream" ("꿈의 팝송")	6:21
5.	"Believe in the Moment" ("순간을 믿어요")	4:13
6.	"With Sorrows that Never Disappear, I Become" ("사라지지 않는 슬픔과 함께 난 조금씩")	5:24
7.	"#1"	3:44
8.	"Deep Sigh" ("깊은 한숨")	5:12
9.	"Daddy-Long-Legs" ("키다리아저씨")	3:03
10.	"Sunflower" ("해바라기")	2:30
11.	"Days in Heaven" ("천국의 나날들")	5:15
