= Pop Song of the Dream =

Studio album by Onnine Ibalgwan
- Released: October 17, 2002
- Genre: Indie rock
- Length: 37:09
- Label: Universal Records

Onnine Ibalgwan chronology
Reminiscences (1998)	Pop Song of the Dream (2002)	Believe in the Moment (2004)

Pop Song of the Dream (Korean: 꿈의 팝송; RR: Kkumui papsong) is the third studio album by South Korean indie rock band Onnine Ibalgwan. The album was released on 17 October 2002.

== Background ==
Prior to the production of the third album, bassist Jeong Moojin, drummer Jeon Daejeong, and guitarist Lee Neungryong joined the band. Lee Seokwon said in an interview that dreams and pop songs on the album's name have a double meaning, and he said "It can be a good pop song like a dream, or a simple combination of dreams and pop songs." Unlike their second album Reminiscences, in which Lee Seokwon and Jeong Daewook composed most of the songs, all the band members participated in the composition without putting too much boundaries between composition and arrangement in the album.

== Critical reception ==
Professional ratings
Review scores
Source	Rating
Music Y	4.5/5 stars
Weiv	7/10

Lee Minhee of IZM described the record as "If they showed the "development" of their first album Pigeon is a Rat in the Sky through their second album Reminiscences, the third album Pop Song of the Dream is a "reversal" of their previous albums." Yoo Seongeun of Music Y reviewed that they had the result of popular success where they could have new dreams through the album. Cha Woojin of Weiv said Pop Song of the Dream is an album that shows the appearance of Onnine Ibalgwan that changes with the passage of time, and it is an album that allows us to infer how they will change in the future.

== Track listing ==
No.	Title	Length
1.	"Heaven (One and Only Love)" ("헤븐 (단 한번의 사랑)")	3:14
2.	"Did You Forget About Me?" ("나를 잊었나요?")	4:17
3.	"It's Okay" ("괜찮아")	4:18
4.	"A Man's Heart" ("남자의 마음")	2:50
5.	"Running While Crying" ("울면서 달리기")	3:27
6.	"Times in 2002" ("2002년의 시간들")	3:59
7.	"Boring Sunday" ("지루한 일요일")	2:28
8.	"Underprivileged Star" ("불우스타 (不遇Star)")	3:20
9.	"Good-Bye" ("안녕")	1:54
10.	"The Look" ("표정")	3:37
11.	"Barbershop Someday" ("언젠가 이발관")	3:45
