= Most Ordinary Existence =

Studio album by Onnine Ibalgwan
- Released: August 8, 2008
- Genre: Indie rock
- Length: 43:41
- Label: Ssamji Music

Onnine Ibalgwan chronology
Believe in the Moment (2004)	Most Ordinary Existence (2008)	People Who Stay Alone (2017)

Most Ordinary Existence (Korean: 가장 보통의 존재; RR: Gajang Botongeui Jonjae) is the fifth studio album by South Korean indie rock band Onnine Ibalgwan. The album was released on 8 August 2008. The album is considered one of the best albums in Korean rock music history, and won the Album of the Year and Best Modern Rock Album at the 2009 Korean Music Awards.

== Background ==
The album has been recorded since early 2005, and Lee Seokwon said the reason why it came out in 2008 as "We had to keep doing it until we got the results we wanted, so the work had to be long." The album has undergone numerous rework, and its release date has been postponed five times.

In an interview with Cine21, Lee Seokwon had an interview comparing their fourth album Believe in the Moment and this album, he described as "In Believe in the Moment, the lyrics were written conventionally and popular on purpose, but in this album, there was a goal to write lyrics that were very characteristic, personal, and clear in narrative at the opposite point." Lee said the album as a concept album.

== Critical reception ==
Professional ratings
Review scores
Source	Rating
IZM	4/5 stars
Music Y	4.5/5 stars
Weiv	8/10

Yoon Jihoon of IZM reviewed "Most Ordinary Existence is a small "incident" because it is a feat that has overcome the inherent limitations of an indie band that released a new song in four years amid the recession in the record industry, and moreover, a concept album unfamiliar to Korea." Kim Yongmin of Music Y said "Many indie bands have built their own territory with genres and band references, but the first-generation indie band Onnine Ibalgwan has escaped its previous mark in Most Ordinary Existence." The music critic Kim Jakka said, "I feel like I'm reading a novel, not listening to music. I feel like I'm looking at a painter's collection of paintings arranged chronologically."

== Track listing ==
No.	Title	Length
1.	"Most Ordinary Existence" ("가장 보통의 존재")	5:21
2.	"Are You Turning into a Devil?" ("너는 악마가 되어가고 있는가")	4:53
3.	"Beautiful Thing" ("아름다운 것")	4:52
4.	"Tiny Heart" ("작은 마음")	3:58
5.	"Unexpected Truth" ("의외의 사실")	5:01
6.	"Alibi" ("알리바이")	3:36
7.	"The Truth Over 100 Years" ("100년 동안의 진심")	2:29
8.	"Life is a Taboo" ("인생은 금물")	4:06
9.	"I am" ("나는")	4:14
10.	"Gently, Gently" ("산들산들")	5:11
