= Playing God (album) =

Studio album by Lang Lee
- Released: 13 July 2016
- Genre: Folk, indie pop
- Length: 36:08
- Label: Somoim, Poclanos
- Producer: Kim Kyeongmo

Lang Lee chronology
Yon Yonson (2012)	Playing God (2016)	There is a Wolf (2021)

Playing God (Korean: 신의 놀이; RR: Sineui nori) is the second studio album by South Korean singer-songwriter Lang Lee. The album was released on 13 July 2016. The album's track Playing God (신의 놀이) won the Best Folk Song at the 2017 Korean Music Awards.

== Background ==
Playing God was produced by Kim Kyeongmo, a member of Sunkyeol, and the album was only available online at the time of release. In an interview with Cine21, she said the album covered "misogyny and violence, and illness and death," and interviewed the album as "I think a work should be a little unfamiliar to the consumers from the beginning. I don't care if it's the way I always go, but when there's a dark place, people get interested" about the album's composition.

== Critical reception ==
Professional ratings
Review scores
Source	Rating
IZM	3.5/5 stars
Music Y	4/5 stars
Weiv	9/10

Hyeon Minhyeong of IZM reviewed "This 'play,' which started from extremely personal experiences, is meaningful because it forms a consensus with those who 'know' their own hamartia beyond their own satisfaction, as she said, defining the value of art's existence as 'comfort'." Jeon Daehan of Weiv said "Lang Lee's Playing God is heterogeneous. It's a music, but it's not just music, it's poetic and novel, but it doesn't mean poetry and fiction itself. It's a strange thing, but it's good music and interesting literature."

== Track listing ==
No.	Title	Length
1.	"Playing God" ("신의 놀이")	2:53
2.	"To Find the family" ("가족을 찾아서")	4:05
3.	"Into the Story" ("이야기 속으로")	2:26
4.	"Sadly Angry" ("슬프게 화가 난다")	4:22
5.	"Laugh, At the Humour" ("웃어, 유머에")	2:43
6.	"A Friend of Tokyo" ("도쿄의 친구")	3:21
7.	"The Ordinary Person" ("평범한 사람")	2:46
8.	"Everyone in The World Started to Hate Me" ("세상 모든 사람들이 나를 미워하기 시작했다")	6:57
9.	"Why Do I Know" ("나는 왜 알아요")	4:07
10.	"Good News, Bad News" ("좋은 소식, 나쁜 소식")	2:28
