= Rough Draft in Progress =

Studio album by Hollow Jan
- Released: December 19, 2006
- Genre: Post-rock, screamo, post-hardcore
- Length: 59:53
- Label: Dope Entertainment

Hollow Jan chronology
Hyacinthus Orientalis of Purple (2005)	Rough Draft in Progress (2006)	Day Off (2014)

Rough Draft in Progress is the debut studio album by South Korean rock band Hollow Jan. The album was released on 19 December 2006 through Dope Entertainment. The album won the Best Rock Album at the 2008 Korean Music Awards.

== Background ==
In 2005, they released the EP Hyacinthus Orientalis of Purple, and they subsequently recorded their first album. They interviewed that they were all office workers with another job, and it was hard to match the time, so it wasn't even easy for all five of them to get together and practice. Regarding the lack of time, they said, "It's album that's unfortunate. Especially in terms of sound. we have a lot of regrets that we wish we had more time."

== Critical reception ==
Na Wonyoung of Weiv said, "Rough Draft In Progress combines the most extreme and emotional genres to sing despair and hope.". The member of the selection committee for the Korean Music Awards Na Dowon described the album as "It is not easy to answer the question of what good music is, but there is no reason to hesitate to listen to Rough Draft in Progress as an example of good music. And most of all, it's a beautiful work," and it won the Best Rock Album.

Publication	List	Rank	Ref.
Music Y	Album of the Year of 2007	1	

== Track listing ==
No.	Title	Length
1.	"Dvaita"	2:29
2.	"Spotless"	6:35
3.	"Nachthexen"	6:44
4.	"Tragic Flaw"	2:09
5.	"Invisible Shadow"	8:33
6.	"Empty"	5:44
7.	"Out of Existence"	7:14
8.	"Water From the Same Source"	6:29
9.	"Agnosticism"	4:26
10.	"Blaze the Trail"	9:30
Total length:		59:53
