= Shin Hae Gyeong =

South Korean shoegaze musician

- Also known as: The Mirror
- Born: 1990 (age 34–35)
- Origin: Seoul, South Korea
- Genres: Dream pop, shoegaze
- Years active: 2014–present
- Labels: Awake, BESPOK

Shin Hae Gyeong (Korean: 신해경; born 1990) is a South Korean shoegaze musician. Shin Hae Gyeong is a stage name and originated from Yi Sang's real name, Kim Hae-Gyeong. He has released an album: In Dreams, In Dreams (속꿈, 속꿈) (2020).

== Career ==
Shin Hae Gyeong started music by learning music from Wings of the Isang's member Moon Jeongmin, and made his debut in 2014 with the song 언젠가 (Someday). His stage name was The Mirror when he debuted, and he later changed his stage name to Shin Hae Gyeong.

He released the EP My Reversible Reaction (나의 가역반응) in 2017. His ep was all sold out in two weeks, and he was nominated for Best New Artist at the 2018 Korean Music Awards. In 2018, he released the single Damdadi (담다디), and he appeared in You Hee-yeol's Sketchbook and The EBS space.

He released his first studio album In Dreams, In Dreams (속꿈, 속꿈) in 2020. The member of the selection committee for the Korean Music Awards Kim Jakka described the album as "armed with the excellent composition embodied in the stave and the dreamlike sound that cannot be implemented" and nominated for best modern rock album. In 2021, he signed with the indie label BESPOK, and he released a single Xanax (감정둔마). He interviewed that he was in the worst state of emotion when he worked on his first studio album, and that he felt relieved when he made the single.

In 2022, he released the EP Neap Paradise (최저낙원).

== Discography ==
=== Studio albums ===
- In Dreams, In Dreams (속꿈, 속꿈) (2020)

=== EPs ===
- My Reversible Reaction (나의 가역반응) (2017)
- Neap Paradise (최저낙원) (2022)
