= Salpoori =

Studio album by Pakk
- Released: 29 August 2017
- Genre: Post-rock; sludge metal
- Length: 46:57
- Label: Mirrorball Music
- Producer: Pakk

Pakk chronology
A Wail (2016)	Salpoori (2017)	Chilgasal (2021)

Salpoori (Korean: 살풀이) is the debut studio album by South Korean post-rock band Pakk. The album was released on 29 August 2017. The vocalist of the band Dabda Kim Jiae featured in the album, and the album was nominated the Best Metal & Hardcore Album at the 2018 Korean Music Awards.

== Background ==
Since the band's EP A Wail (곡소리) release in 2016, they have started to work on their first studio album, and several songs that had been planned for the third album of Kim Daein's solo project Jelly Boy were included in this album. The band decided to make a concept album under the theme of Salpuri, a Korean shamanic dance, and named most of the tracks in one letter. Kim Daein described the album as "a salpuri against evil air that are full of this world."

== Critical reception ==
Kim Dongseok of Music Y reviewed the album as "Like a screamo recited without screaming, the song becomes a sorcery and is constantly transformed differently with the riff," and the album was named the first place in 2017 Album of the Year. Chung Byungwook of Indiepost described the album as "The sound of Salpoori, which combines such western traditions into Korean-native psychedelics while mixing griddle, sludge metal, and hardcore punk, is clearly unique to this album." Cho Ildong, a member of the selection committee for the Korean Music Awards, said "Salpoori sounds like an aesthetics of contradiction and a hot gutpan that reproduces contradictory reality in a cutthroat way."

Publication	List	Rank	Ref.
Music Y	Album of the Year of 2017	1	

== Track listing ==
No.	Title	Length
1.	"Water Dropper" ("연적 (硯滴)")	1:54
2.	"Distress" ("곤 (困)")	4:57
3.	"Cursing Ritual" ("살 (煞)")	5:26
4.	"Collabo" ("협 (協)")	3:34
5.	"Detrimental" ("해 (害)")	3:11
6.	"Eviller" ("악 (惡)")	4:23
7.	"Cowardice" ("겁 (怯)")	4:42
8.	"Melancholy Cries of Ghost" ("유 (䰰)") (featuring Kim Jiae)	4:23
9.	"Destroy" ("파 (破)")	4:42
10.	"Re-" ("재 (再)")	7:47
11.	"Water Rest" ("여적 (餘滴)")	1:58
