= Reminiscences (album) =

Studio album by Onnine Ibalgwan
- Released: December 1, 1998
- Genre: Indie rock
- Length: 54:48
- Label: Shinara Music

Onnine Ibalgwan chronology
Pigeon is a Rat in the Sky (1996)	Reminiscences (1998)	Pop Song of the Dream (2002)

Reminiscences (Korean: 후일담; RR: Hooildam) is the second studio album by South Korean indie rock band Onnine Ibalgwan. The album was released on 1 December 1998.

== Background ==
In November 1996, they released their debut studio album The Pigeon is the Sky's Rat, since then, the members have changed a lot, and Lee Seok-won was commissioned for an animation music project, but the project was cancelled. The bassist Lee Sangmoon and drummer Kim Taeyoon joined as new members ahead of their second album.

== Critical reception ==
Professional ratings
Review scores
Source	Rating
Music Y	4/5 stars

Yoon Jihoon of IZM reviewed, "Reminiscences was a foreshadowing of that small but passionate cheer, and it remains an unforgettable afterword." Park Byeongwoon of Music Y described the album as "Compared to the first album The Pigeon is the Sky's Rat, which secretly embedded dagger despite its soft and clean appearance, Reminiscences shows signs of contemplating the mature performance as a band and the composition of the album." In 2008, the album was ranked 68th on the list of Korea's top 100 popular music albums led by Kyunghyang Shinmun, and critic Moon Jeongho reviewed it as "In conclusion, Reminiscences is far from a "textual masterpiece" that forces admiration only on record grounds. The album is an album that you listen to without any time to accumulate dust even if it is displayed in the most distant place from the audio."

== Track listing ==
No.	Title	Length
1.	"Yuri" ("유리")	3:47
2.	"Yesterday I Met a Shooting Star" ("어제 만난 슈팅스타")	5:11
3.	"Paradise Lost" ("실낙원")	4:26
4.	"Dream Pop Song" ("꿈의 팝송")	5:34
5.	"Heart with No Purity" ("순수함이라곤 없는 정")	4:03
6.	"What is Next Song?" ("다음 곡은 뭐죠?")	1:55
7.	"One Given Day" ("어떤 날")	5:04
8.	"Nameless Taxi" ("무명 택시")	4:13
9.	"Inshallah" ("인샬라")	3:09
10.	"Star of a Life" ("인생의 별")	6:17
11.	"Plaintive Confession" ("청승 고백")	7:29
12.	"Your Secret Garden" ("너의 비밀 화원")	3:43
