= My Reversible Reaction =

EP by Shin Hae Gyeong
- Released: 22 February 2017
- Genre: Dream pop, shoegaze
- Length: 23:54
- Label: Young, Gifted & Wack Records, Poclanos
- Producer: Shin Hae Gyeong

Shin Hae Gyeong chronology
My Reversible Reaction (2017)	In Dreams, In Dreams (2020)

My Reversible Reaction (Korean: 나의 가역반응; RR: Naeui gayeokbaneung) is the extended play (EP) by South Korean singer-songwriter Shin Hae Gyeong. The album was released on 22 February 2017.

== Background ==
Shin Hae Gyeong debuted in 2014 and previously worked under the stage name The Mirror before the album. He changed his stage name to Shin Hae Gyeong, named after Yi Sang's real name Kim Hae-Gyeong, while reading his poetry collection. The album's name also comes from his poet Weird Reversible Reaction (이상한 가역반응).

== Critical reception ==
Professional ratings
Review scores
Source	Rating
IZM	3.5/5 stars

Park Soojin of IZM reviewed "My Reversible Reaction has an attractive confidence and detailed joints that push the flow of the song." Kim Seonghwan of Music Y described the album's track Everything to Me (모두 주세요) as "It's a track that makes the title track even in the consistent composition of the album and easily conveys the characteristics of musician Shin Hae Gyeong at once." Music critic Bae Soontak said, "My Reversible Reaction is an album that builds impressive moments with a fairly clear melody in the air that seems to be floating, and a fairly intense rhythm appears when you think it's 'a bit calm'."

== Track listing ==
No.	Title	Length
1.	"Ennui" ("권태")	4:36
2.	"Downfall" ("몰락")	3:41
3.	"Everything to Me" ("모두 주세요")	4:04
4.	"A Forgotton Season" ("잊었던 계절")	1:53
5.	"Danae" ("다나에")	3:27
6.	"Chemical Equilibrium" ("화학평형")	6:13
