= Pigeon Is a Rat in the Sky =

Studio album by Onnine Ibalgwan
- Released: November 9, 1996
- Genre: Indie rock
- Length: 50:45
- Label: Seokisidae, King Records

Onnine Ibalgwan chronology
| Pigeon Is a Rat in the Sky (1996) | Reminiscences (1998) |

Pigeon Is a Rat in the Sky (Korean: 비둘기는 하늘의 쥐; RR: Bidoolgineun haneuleui Jwi) is the debut studio album by South Korean indie rock band Onnine Ibalgwan. The album was released on 9 November 1996.

== Background ==
In 1990s, Lee Seokwon lied about being a vocalist of a band that didn't exist, to participate in the rock music gathering, which is the beginning of Onnine Ibalgwan. When he even appeared on KBS' radio broadcast and lied about a band that didn't exist, and it grew out of control. He later dreamt of becoming an actual musician, and with the help of Yoon Byeongjoo of Noise Garden, he formed a real band. The album's booklet does not contain any information about composition, and Lee Seokwon was only involved in vocal melody and composition on the album.

== Critical reception ==
Professional ratings
Review scores
| Source | Rating |
|---|---|
| Music Y | 4.5/5 stars |
| Weiv | 8/10 |

Kim Byeongwoo of Music Y reviewed "Pigeon is a Rat in the Sky is a product of the "band" called the "Onnine Ibalgwan" and commemorates the happiest childhood of the "group" centered around the band." Jang Hoyeon of Weiv said "When the Korean indie scene was formed, the debut album of Onnine Ibalgwan Pigeon is a Rat in the Sky is remembered as an album that announced a new sensibility in the topography of Korean indie and also showed the epitome of guitar pop." The album ranked 34th in the top 100 Korean albums hosted by Kyunghyang Shinmun, and music critic Cho Wonhee said "They secured contemporaneity with Western pop music, showed their ability to extract bright melodies from simple chord work, and the virtues of the new band's first album vary from formal beauty that overcame the mannerisms of Korean pop music at the time."

== Track listing ==
| No. | Title | Length |
|---|---|---|
| 1. | "Poo-Hut" ("푸훗") | 3:11 |
| 2. | "Admiration" ("동경") | 3:07 |
| 3. | "Can't Show You This" ("보여줄 순 없겠지") | 3:23 |
| 4. | "Rat is You" ("쥐는 너야") | 6:24 |
| 5. | "Birthday Mood" ("생일 기분") | 4:04 |
| 6. | "Stop Walking, Start Chasing" ("산책 끝 추격전") | 6:30 |
| 7. | "Fan Club" ("팬클럽") | 3:59 |
| 8. | "Roland Gorilla" ("로랜드 고릴라") | 3:09 |
| 9. | "Commercial Grunge" ("상업그런지") | 3:33 |
| 10. | "Empire of Hatred" ("미움의 제국") | 5:59 |
| 11. | "Boy" ("소년") | 4:32 |
| 12. | "Funny Afternoon" ("우스운 오후") | 2:54 |
