= Radical Is a Relative Concept =

Studio album by Sunkyeol
- Released: January 20, 2015
- Genre: Shoegaze, dream pop
- Length: 31:47
- Label: Somoim

Sunkyeol chronology
Sunkyeol (2010)	Radical Is a Relative Concept (2015)

Radical Is a Relative Concept (Korean: 급진은 상대적 개념; RR: Geubjineun sangdaejeok gaemyeom) is the debut studio album by South Korean shoegaze band Sunkyeol. The album was released on 20 January 2015.

== Background ==
Radical Is a Relative Concept was recorded between Seoul and Yorkshire, England. The cover image of the album is a photo of a struggleist taken at a cafe in Myeong-dong, which is a photo of photographer Park Jung-geun. The band interviewed that there was no political meaning about the image, and that they used the image because they wanted an album cover with a heterogeneous feel. They released the album only as a CD for half a year, after which they released online streaming. Kim Kyeongmo said "Usually people don't seem to buy CDs or MP3s if they listen to streaming first, so we wanted to release CDs first and experiment it" why they released the music only on CD.

== Critical reception ==
Jeong Goowon of Weiv reviewed "It's not without an ear-catching melody, but the melody line is an album that is constantly disrupted by the sound of other instruments that perform their initial utility due to continuous repetition, weathering, or randomly interrupting." Park Sohyeon of Art Insight described the track Our Relationship is Overrated (우리의 연애는 과대평가되어있어) of the album as "It's lonely, but if you listen to a cozy sound, you can look into our hearts."

== Track listing ==
No.	Title	Length
1.	"We Will Call it Music" ("음악이라 부르기로 한다")	4:37
2.	"Still Young" ("아직 어려")	3:51
3.	"We Are Monarchs, We Are Also Servants" ("우린 군주이고 하인이어라")	2:52
4.	"Our Relationship is Overrated" ("우리의 연애는 과대평가되어있어")	4:02
5.	"Repeated Hypnosis" ("반복되는 최면")	1:34
6.	"Sit Me Down Here" ("나를 여기 앉히네")	2:17
7.	"The Place to Put the Mind On" ("마음을 둘 곳")	4:45
8.	"The Tide has Turned" ("세는 역전되었어")	2:44
9.	"Swinging Swing" ("흔들거리는 그네")	1:44
10.	"Radical is a Relative Concept" ("급진은 상대적 개념")	3:21
