= But, All the Shining Things Are =

Studio album by Dabda
- Released: June 7, 2020
- Genre: Math rock, post-rock
- Length: 43:18
- Label: Poclanos

Dabda chronology
Island of Each (2016)	But, All the Shining Things Are (2020)	Yonder (2023)

Singles from But, All the Shining Things Are
- 1. "Journey" Released: 19 May 2020

But, All the Shining Things Are is the debut studio album by South Korean rock band Dabda. The album was released on 7 June 2020.

== Background ==
Dabda described the album as "The story about a person who can't escape from futility and lethargy and his or her own way of living and his or her gaze. We sometimes fall into nihilism as a defense against anxiety and fear encountered in the process of visiting rather than finding meaning due to the weight of painful life, and we tried to prove the process of brilliantly breaking by collecting pieces of these eyes." Prior to the album release, they released the track Journey along with Naver Onstage Live release.

== Critical reception ==
Yang Soha of Ton Plein reviewed "Dabda's But, All The Shining Things Are continues to run with its colourful sounds, performances, and lyrics." Cho Ildong of Music Y described the track Journey as "Two guitars that go unnoticed, but can't forget the tone made of rebives and phasers, play over the changing rhythmic battery."

== Track listing ==
No.	Title	Length
1.	"Light Comes Back"	2:43
2.	"Summer Game" ("여름놀이")	4:15
3.	"Journey"	4:56
4.	"Playing Alone" ("혼자놀기")	4:52
5.	"Look of a Dream" ("꿈의 표정")	5:11
6.	"Sway and Waver" ("흔들흔들")	4:55
7.	"Stars," ("별아")	1:03
8.	"Piercing the Black Night" ("검은 밤을 가르던")	4:42
9.	"Polydream"	6:41
10.	"Dull" ("무딘")	3:59
