= Aseul =

South Korean electropop musician

- Also known as: Yukari
- Born: Lee Soojeong
- Origin: Incheon, South Korea
- Genres: Electropop, synthpop
- Years active: 2012–present
- Labels: Astro Kidz; Poclanos

Lee Soojeong (Korean: 이수정), better known by her stage name Aseul (Korean: 아슬), is a South Korean electropop musician. She released two studio albums: Echo (2012) under the stage name Yukari, and New Pop (2016) under the stage name Aseul.

== Career ==
Aseul was born in Incheon. She majored in electronic digital music at Kyonggi University Seoul campus, and she moved to Seoul for the university. She debuted under the stage name Yukari and released her studio album Echo in 2012.

Lee changed her stage name to Aseul, she said the reason she changed her stage name was to be more serious. and released her studio album New Pop in 2016. The album was nominated for the Best Dance and Electronic Album at the 2017 Korean Music Awards. She released the EP Asobi in 2018, performed on Zandari Festa.

In 2020, she released the EP Slow Dance. The member of the selection committee for the Korean Music Awards Lee Jaehoon described the album's track, Bye Bye Summer, as "This is what romantic sounds are like," and the track won the Best Dance & Electronic Song. In 2021, she participated in Wings of the Isang's album The Borderline Between Hope and Despair.

== Discography ==
=== Studio albums ===
- Echo (2012) (as Yukari)
- New Pop (2016)

=== EPs ===
- Asobi (2018)
- Slow Dance (2020)

=== Singles ===
- Always with You (2018)
- Sandcastles (2018)
- Joke (2019)
- Fade Away (2019)
- Tell Me I Am Dreaming (2023)
