= Day Off =

A day off is a non-working day.

It may also refer to:

- Day Off (album), South Korean album
- Day Off (film), French film
- Day Off (TV program), former Philippine TV series
- Days Off (EP)
- A Day Off, a 1968 South Korean drama film
- Day Off, 2023 Taiwanese film starring Lu Hsiao-Fen, Fu Meng-po, Annie Chen and Beatrice Fang

== See also ==
- Paid time off
