= In Dreams, In Dreams =

Studio album by Shin Hae Gyeong
- Released: June 16, 2020
- Genre: Dream pop, shoegaze
- Length: 32:13
- Label: Poclanos

Shin Hae Gyeong chronology
My Reversible Reaction (2017)	In Dreams, In Dreams (2020)	Neap Paradise (2022)

In Dreams, In Dreams (Korean: 속꿈, 속꿈; RR: Sokkoom sokkoom) is the debut studio album by South Korean dream pop artist Shin Hae Gyeong. The album was released on 16 June 2020.

== Background ==
Shin Hae Gyeong succeeded through the 2017 EP My Reversible Reaction (나의 가역반응), and In Dreams, In Dreams was recorded as a follow-up concept for a narrator described in the previous ep as a person who can't be caught moving between helpless reality and confused dreams. The fifth track Monologue (독백), depicts loneliness and sadness, and Shin Hae Gyeong interviewed the track as his favourite track.

== Critical reception ==
Professional ratings
Review scores
Source	Rating
IZM	3/5 stars

Jang Joonhwan of IZM described the album as "In Dreams, In Dream has a lower concentration of bible reverberation and exploration enthusiasm than during My Reversible Reaction when the sun never set, but there is no disagreement that this album is the kindest and most comfortable work to enter the worldview established by Shin Hae Gyeong." Kim Byeongwoo of Music Y reviewed, "He is well aware that it is difficult to protect his world entirely, which is why he carefully starts the album in a way that extends the sanctions on his previous work. He start so carefully and fill his world closely, but it does not stop as an extension of its previous EP, but extends elsewhere."

Publication	List	Rank	Ref.
Music Y	Album of the Year of 2020	8	

== Track listing ==
No.	Title	Length
1.	"Reminiscence" ("회상")	1:58
2.	"And Then" ("그 후")	4:32
3.	"Someday" ("어떤날")	3:38
4.	"Colors of You" ("그대는 총천연색")	4:30
5.	"Monologue" ("독백")	2:12
6.	"Butterfly Dream" ("접몽")	2:58
7.	"Dreaming of You" ("그대의 꿈결")	4:55
8.	"Crocus" ("크로커스")	2:36
9.	"Like a Blooming Season" ("꽃 피는 계절처럼")	4:54
