= Yonder (EP) =

EP by Dabda
- Released: 25 August 2023
- Recorded: May 2023
- Genre: Math rock
- Length: 25:11
- Label: Electric Muse
- Producer: Dabda

Dabda chronology
But, All the Shining Things Are (2020)	Yonder (2023)

Yonder is the extended play (EP) by South Korean math rock band Dabda. The album was released on 25 August 2023.

== Background ==
The album was recorded in May 2023 at Sangsang Madang Recording Studio in Chuncheon. The album's theme is admiration and desire for nature, which was influenced by the band's trip to Thailand. Dabda described the EP as "A catalyst to boost the energy of the band, which had subsided due to the pandemic."

== Critical reception ==
Music critic Seojeongmingab reviewed "Yonder is an album that drives you as if you're going to run faster than the Earth's rotation and revolution instead of walking slowly and falling asleep." Kim Seonghwan of Music Y described the album's track One, World, Wound as "The song that shines with the musical growth of a band that challenges a piece of art rock/metal with the precision of mass rock."

== Track listing ==
No.	Title	Length
1.	"Playing With Fire" ("불놀이")	4:39
2.	"Flower Tail"	5:21
3.	"Origin" ("기원")	4:06
4.	"Cloud City" ("구름도시")	5:49
5.	"One, World, Wound"	5:16
