= The Borderline Between Hope and Despair =

Studio album by Wings of the Isang
- Released: 7 September 2021
- Genre: Post-rock
- Length: 75:07
- Label: Mirrorball Music
- Producer: Wings of the Isang

Wings of the Isang chronology
Stream of Consciousness (2016)	The Borderline Between Hope and Despair (2021)	Contain Both a Moment and Eternity (2023)

Singles from The Borderline Between Hope and Despair
- 1. "No Longer Human" Released: 16 November 2017; 2. "Incense" Released: 29 November 2017

The Borderline Between Hope and Despair (Korean: 희망과 절망의 경계; RR: Heuimanggwa Jeolmangeui Gyeonggye) is the second studio album by South Korean post-rock band Wings of the Isang. The album was released on 7 September 2021. South Korean singer-songwriter Aseul featured two tracks - Shadow (그림자) and Eternity (영원), and the album won The Best Modern Rock Album at the 2022 Korean Music Awards.

== Critical reception ==
Park Byeongwoon of Music Y reviewed "Just like the flow of Stream of Consciousness, their previous album, The Borderline Between Hope and Despair also leaves a strong and faint lingering feeling as if it were poking the lungs." The member of the selection committee for the Korean Music Awards Hong Jeongtaek described the album as "The Borderline Between Hope and Despair is a heavy resonance album with maturity, reflection, and a bit of romance", and the album won Best Modern Rock Album.

== Track listing ==
No.	Title	Length
1.	"Shadow" ("그림자") (featuring Aseul)	8:01
2.	"Gravity" ("중력")	7:18
3.	"Illusion" ("일루션")	4:47
4.	"Twenty Years Old" ("스무살")	5:26
5.	"Home" ("홈")	7:02
6.	"Youth" ("푸른봄")	5:10
7.	"One Day, the Sky That I Stood Still and Looked at While Walking on the Crosswalk in Front of Dunchon-Dong Station" ("어느 날 둔촌동역 앞 횡단보도를 걷다가 가만히 서서 바라본 하늘")	6:32
8.	"Incense" ("향")	8:02
9.	"No Longer Human" ("인간실격")	8:51
10.	"Eternity" ("영원") (featuring Aseul)	13:58
