= 11111101 =

Studio album by Idiotape
- Released: 11 November 2011
- Genre: Electronic, new rave
- Length: 54:21
- Label: DooRooDooRoo Artist Company
- Producer: Idiotape

Idiotape chronology
0805 (2010)	11111101 (2011)	Tours (2014)

11111101 is the debut studio album by South Korean electronic music group Idiotape. The album was released on 11 November 2011. The album won The Best Dance & Electronic Album at the 2012 Korean Music Awards.

== Critical reception ==
11111101 is described as the most innovative combination of electronic music and rock music. Music Y's Yeolsimhi described the album as "Based on experience in various genres and an understanding of their respective tools, works that take on the attitudes and methods of rock and electronica in a wonderful way" and named it first place in 2011 album of the year. The member of the selection committee for the Korean Music Awards Lee Daehee reviewed "11111101 was the best discovery in Korean pop music in 2011, with the playfulness of an analog synthesiser and the uprightness of a drum that seems to have been heard of somewhere.", and the album won The Best Dance & Electronic Album.

Publication	List	Rank	Ref.
Music Y	Album of the Year of 2011	1	

== Track listing ==
No.	Title	Length
1.	"Pluto"	4:50
2.	"080509"	6:55
3.	"Melodie"	5:00
4.	"Sunset Strip"	4:32
5.	"Idio_T"	5:42
6.	"Heyday"	4:30
7.	"Toad Song"	5:28
8.	"Even Floor"	5:26
9.	"Wasted"	6:17
10.	"League"	5:41
