= Onnine Ibalgwan =

South Korean modern rock band

Sister's Barbershop
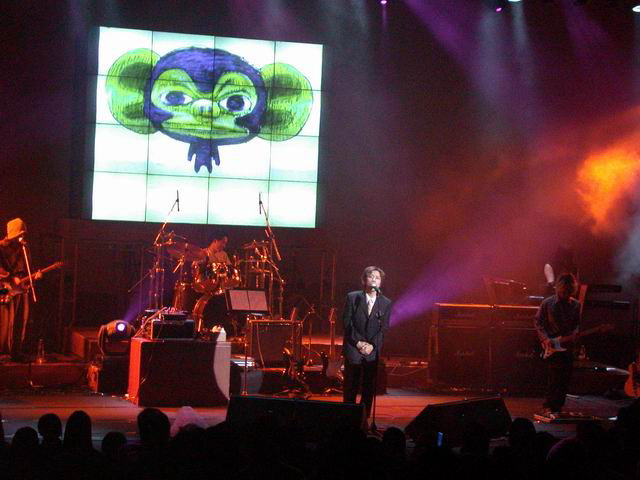
- Sister's Barbershop in December 2002.

Background information
- Origin: Seoul, South Korea
- Genres: Rock
- Years active: 1996–2017
- Past members: Lee Seok-won; Lee Neung-ryong; Jeon Dae-jeong; Jeong Dae-wuk; Jeong Mu-jin; Ryu Gi-deok; Yu Cheol-sang; Lee Sang-mun; Kim Tae-yun
- Website: Official website

Onnine Ibalgwan (Korean: 언니네이발관), also known as Sister's Barbershop, was a South Korean modern rock band. The group debuted in 1996 with the album, Pigeon is a Rat in the Sky, which received rave reviews from critics and music fans. The group disbanded in 2017.

== Discography ==
- Pigeon is a Rat in the Sky (비둘기는 하늘의 쥐), 1996
- Reminiscences (후일담), 1998
- Pop Song of the Dream (꿈의 팝송), 2002
- Believe in the Moment (순간을 믿어요), 2004
- Most Ordinary Existence (가장 보통의 존재), 2008
- People Who Stay Alone (홀로 있는 사람들), 2017

== Awards ==
=== Korean Music Awards ===
Year	Category	Recipient	Result
2009	Album of the Year	Most Ordinary Existence	Won
2009	Best Modern Rock Album	Most Ordinary Existence	Won
2009	Best Modern Rock Song	"Beautiful Thing"	Won
