= Stream of Consciousness (Wings of the Isang album) =

Studio album by Wings of the Isang
- Released: 16 September 2016
- Genre: Post-rock
- Length: 84:18
- Label: Mirrorball Music
- Producer: Wings of the Isang

Wings of the Isang chronology
The Story of You and Me (2013)	Stream of Consciousness (2016)	The Borderline Between Hope and Despair (2021)

Stream of Consciousness (Korean: 의식의흐름; RR: Uisiguiheureum) is the debut studio album by South Korean post-rock band Wings of the Isang. The album was released on 6 September 2016. The album won The Best Modern Rock Album at the 2017 Korean Music Awards.

== Background ==
Wings of the Isang was named The EBS space's Hello Rookie in 2014 and received attention. The label Mirrorball Music said the album as "it's a double album on two CDs with a total of 11 songs and more than 84 minutes of running time by seeking changes and trying new styles while maintaining the existing framework for the past three years."

== Critical reception ==
Professional ratings
Review scores
Source	Rating
IZM	3.5/5 stars
Music Y	4/5 stars

Kim Sungdae of Music Y reviewed "Wings of the Isang's music is like a tear, it pursues beauty to the bone and at the same time drives listeners to a corner with a huge sound that is likely to tear this Earth", and the album was named first place in 2016 Album of the Year. The member of the selection committee for the Korean Music Awards Lee Taehoon, reviewed the album as "detailed sensibility, beautiful melody, grand sound and explosive energy", and the album won the best modern rock record in 2017.

Publication	List	Rank	Ref.
Music Y	Album of the Year of 2016	1	

== Track listing ==
No.	Title	Length
1.	"Stream of Consciousness" ("의식의흐름")	7:26
2.	"Crimson Sky" ("붉은하늘")	7:27
3.	"Cosmos" ("코스모스")	8:36
4.	"New Era" ("신세계")	7:05
5.	"Snowy Eye" ("눈")	8:02
6.	"Wings" ("날개")	5:15
7.	"Forgotten" ("망각")	7:13
8.	"May" ("오월")	7:09
9.	"Lost" ("상실의시대")	7:29
10.	"Dark Sea" ("검은바다")	7:50
11.	"Void Circle" ("공")	10:46
