= Sunkyeol =

South Korean indie rock band

- Origin: Seoul, South Korea
- Genres: Shoegaze
- Years active: 2010-present
- Labels: Somoim Records
- Members: Kim Kyeongmo; Cho Yonghoon; Cho Incheol; Lee Hyeji; Joe Hollick

Sunkyeol (Korean: 선결) is a South Korean shoegaze band. The band currently consists of Kim Kyeongmo, Cho Yonghoon, Cho Incheol, Lee Hyeji and Joe Hollick. Since their formation in 2010, the band has released a studio album Radical is a Relative Concept (급진은 상대적 개념) (2015).

== Career ==
Sunkyeol was formed in 2010, Kim Kyeongmo and Joe Hollick have been making music together in London since 2005. released a self-titled EP the same year.

In 2015, they released their first studio album, Radical is a Relative Concept (급진은 상대적 개념). The album cover used a photo of a struggleist taken in Myeong-dong in 2011 by Park Jung-geun. They said in an interview that the image was used as an album cover because it gave a heterogeneous feeling, and that there was no political meaning. The album was initially produced only on CD, and online streaming was released six months later. The album was highly supported by South Korean indie fans and topped the K-Indie Chart, a music chart that counts South Korea's pure record sales. Members Kim Kyeongmo and Lee Hyeji participated in Lang Lee's second album Playing God, which was released in 2016.

== Discography ==
=== Studio albums ===
- Radical is a Relative Concept (급진은 상대적 개념) (2015)

=== EPs ===
- Sunkyeol (2010)
