= Différance (album) =

Studio album by Jambinai
- Released: 2 February 2012
- Genre: Post-rock
- Length: 44:32
- Label: GMC Records

Jambinai chronology
Jambinai (2010)	Différance (2012)	A Hermitage (2016)

Re-mastered version cover
- Re-mastered version cover

Différance (Korean: 차연; RR: Chayeon) is the debut studio album by South Korean post-rock band Jambinai. The album was released on 2 February 2012. The album's name comes from Différance, a concept created by French philosopher Jacques Derrida. The album won the best jazz and crossover crossover album at the 2013 Korean Music Award. In 2014, the album was re-released as a remastered version.

== Critical reception ==
Professional ratings
Review scores
Source	Rating
IZM	3.5/5 stars

Kim Banya of IZM described the album as "Différance is the album that unravel the scope and boundaries of expression by crushing and destroying musical instruments." The member of the selection committee for the Korean Music Awards Cho Ildong reviewed "Jambinai's Différance is a wake-up call for those who have fixed crossover as a genre as well as its own musical completeness," and the album won the best jazz and crossover crossover album.

== Track listing ==
No.	Title	Length
1.	"Time Of Extinction" ("소멸의 시간")	2:56
2.	"Grace Kelly"	3:21
3.	"Glow Upon Closed Eyes" ("감긴 눈 위로 비추는 불빛")	6:30
4.	"Paramita Pt. 1" ("바라밀다 Part. 1")	4:20
5.	"Paramita Pt. 2" ("바라밀다 Part. 2")	4:16
6.	"Hand Of Redemption" ("구원의 손길")	4:48
7.	"Empty Pupil Pt. 1" ("텅빈 눈동자 Part. 1")	3:57
8.	"Empty Pupil Pt. 2" ("텅빈 눈동자 Part. 2")	4:44
9.	"Connection"	9:40
