= Pakk =

South Korean post-rock band

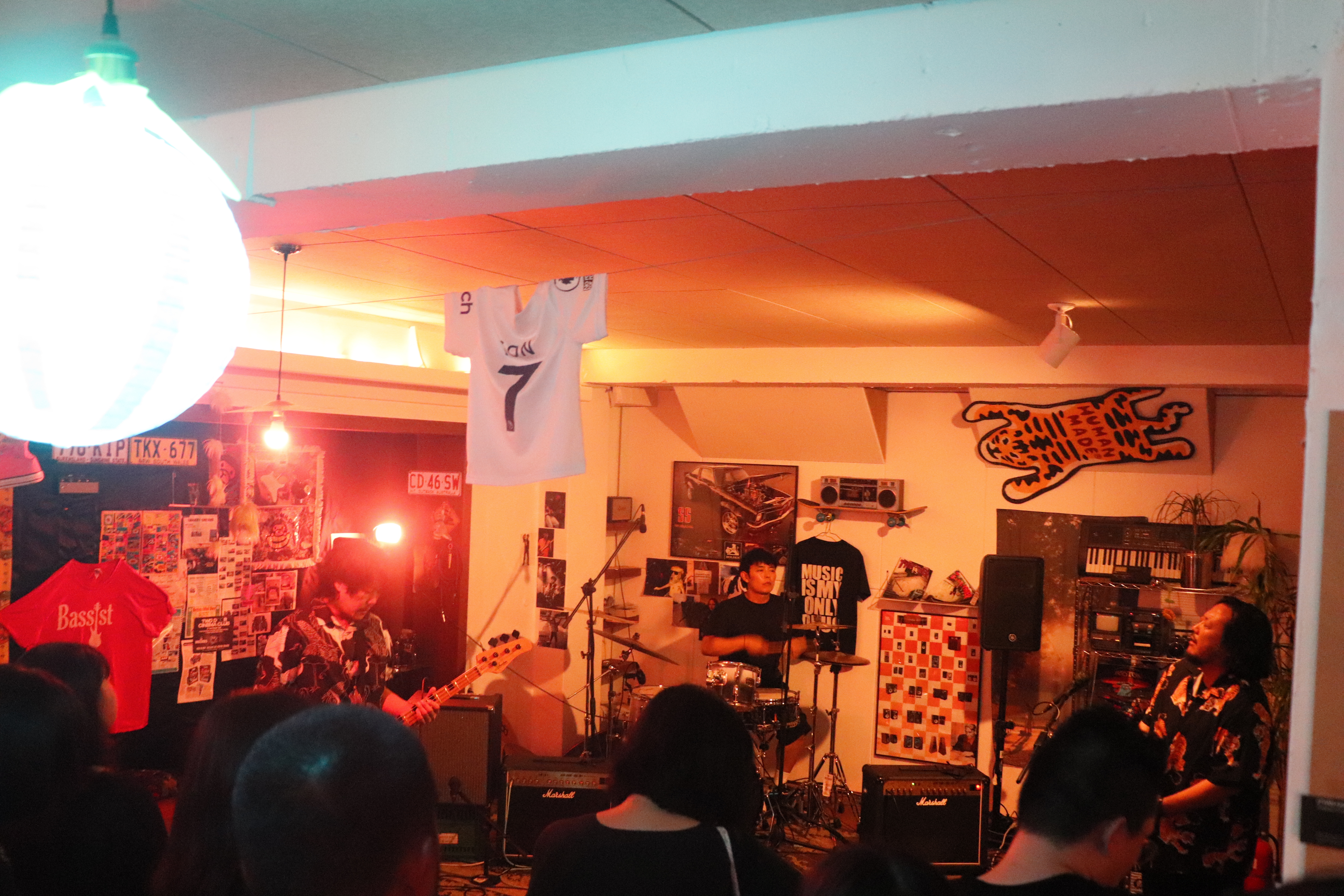
- Pakk in 2026

Background information
- Origin: Seoul, South Korea
- Genres: Post-rock; post-hardcore
- Years active: 2014-present
- Label: Mirror Ball Records
- Members: Park Hyeonseok; Kim Daein; Kim Taeho

Pakk (Korean: 팎) is a South Korean post-rock band. The band currently consists of Park Hyeonseok, Kim Daein and Kim Taeho. Since their formation in 2014, the band has released two studio albums Salpoori (살풀이) (2017) and Chilgasal (칠가살) (2021). Their music is described as music that accuses the contradictions of the real world through the shamanistic worldview.

== Career ==
Pakk was formed in 2014, and member Kim Daein is also a member of Apollo 18, Jelly Boy and Zeonpasa. In 2016, they released an EP A Wail (곡소리), released in cassette tape format, and the recording was done in a one-take.

In 2017, Pakk released his first studio album Salpoori (살풀이). Music Y named the album first place in the album of the year 2017. The album was nominated for Best Metal & Hardcore Album at the 2018 Korean Music Awards.

In 2021, they released their second album, Chilgasal (칠가살). The selection committee for the Korean Music Awards Kim Seongdae described the album as "the album that digs into the dark and humid social aspects of Korea and accuses them by music", and nominated the album to the 2022 Best Rock Album. In 2022, they had a joint concert with Lee Ilwoo from Jambinai.

== Discography ==
=== Studio albums ===
- Salpoori (살풀이) (2017)
- Chilgasal (칠가살) (2021)

=== EPs ===
- A Wail (곡소리) (2016)
