= Day Off (album) =

Studio album by Hollow Jan
- Released: March 10, 2014
- Genre: Post-rock, post-hardcore
- Length: 61:40
- Label: Dope Entertainment

Hollow Jan chronology
Rough Draft in Progress (2006)	Day Off (2014)	Confusion (2023)

Day Off is the second studio album by South Korean rock band Hollow Jan. The album was released on 10 March 2014 through Dope Entertainment.

== Background ==
After the success of their debut studio album Rough Draft in Progress released in 2006, they went on hiatus. After that, it was re-united for the live club Sam's last concert before closing, 20002011 in 2011, and with this opportunity, they recorded their second album. The album is a concept album about death, and it tells different stories of death throughout from Day 0 to Day 7.

== Critical reception ==
Professional ratings
Review scores
Source	Rating
IZM	3.5/5 stars

Lee Kiseon of IZM reviewed "Hollow Jan broke down typicality and built the result with a strong commitment to the genre and a belief in the message." The member of the selection committee for the Korean Music Awards Lim Heeyoon nominated the album for best rock album, describing it as "An album like an auditory detail depicting a tumult on the verge of extinction."

Publication	List	Rank	Ref.
Music Y	Album of the Year of 2014	8	

== Track listing ==
No.	Title	Length
1.	"Day 0: Purple Night"	1:33
2.	"Day 1: Perfect Ending"	8:28
3.	"Day 2: The Day Before"	13:21
4.	"Day 3: The Day After"	10:56
5.	"Day 4: Invitation of the Wind"	4:47
6.	"Day 5: The Ugly Dancing of the Tramp Clown"	8:40
7.	"Day 6: Return to Universe"	4:04
8.	"Day 7: Poem of the Ocean"	9:51
Total length:		61:40
