= Dabda =

South Korean math rock band

- Origin: Seoul, South Korea
- Genres: Math rock; post rock
- Years active: 2013-present
- Labels: Mirror Ball Music, Tron Music
- Members: Lee Seunghyeon; Kim Jiae; Park Jungwoong; Noh Keohyeon
- Past members: Lee Joseph; Bae Sangeon; Park Heesoo

Dabda (Korean: 다브다) is a South Korean math rock band. The band currently consists of Lee Seunghyeon, Kim Jiae, Park Jungwoong, and Noh Keohyeon. Since their formation in 2014, the band has released the studio album But, All the Shining Things Are (2020).

== History ==
Dabda was formed in Seoul. Lee Seunghyeon and Kim Jiae attended the same university in Daejeon, and later met other members after they moved to Seoul. The band name is derived from the Five stages of grief, from the book On Death and Dying by Elizabeth Kubler-Ross. They released their first single, 황금사자 in 2013, and were introduced as rookies on EBS in 2014.

In 2016, they released their first EP Island of Each (저마다 섬). KBS World Radio described the album as "Deep, Azure-Coloured, Immersive Music". In 2018, they released their new single, Look of a Dream (꿈의 표정). They won the Grand Prize in the Super Rookie at the Pentaport Rock Festival. In 2019, they performed with Yeseo, George, and Rich Mix at the K-Music Showcase 2019 hosted by The Korean Cultural Centre UK.

In 2020, they were joined by Park Heesoo after past bassist Bae Sangeon left, and released their first full-length album, But, All the Shining Things Are. After the album's release, Park Heesoo left the band, and Noh Keohyeon, a producer of the existing band, newly joined as a bassist. In 2021, they released their collaboration single Jungle Gym with Japanese math rock band Toe. In 2023, they released a new EP Yonder. Lee Arim of Music Y Magazine described the album's track One, World, Wound as "It makes Frida Kahlo's portrait overlap, leaving a long lingering impression like a flame that never goes out"

== Members ==
=== Current members ===
- Lee Seunghyeon – drums (2013–present)
- Kim Jiae – vocals (2013–present)
- Park Jungwoong – guitar (2025–present)
- Noh Keohyeon – bass (2021–present)

=== Past members ===
- Lee Joseph – guitar (2013–2025)
- Bae Sangeon – bass (2013–2019)
- Park Heesoo – bass (2020)

== Discography ==
=== Albums ===
- But, All the Shining Things Are (2020)

=== Extended plays ===
- Island of Each (저마다 섬) (2016)
- Yonder (2023)
- ON(百) (2026)
