= A Hermitage =

Studio album by Jambinai
- Released: 17 June 2016
- Genre: Post-rock
- Length: 47:07
- Label: Bella Union

Jambinai chronology
Différance (2012)	A Hermitage (2016)	Onda (2019)

A Hermitage (Korean: 은서; RR: Eunseo) is the second studio album by South Korean post-rock band Jambinai. The album was released on 17 June 2016 through Bella Union.

== Background ==
After the success of their first studio album Différance, Jambinai gained popularity by performing at World Village Festival and WOMEX. They signed with the British label Bella Union, and they began recording their second album.

== Critical reception ==
Professional ratings
Aggregate scores
Source	Rating
Metacritic	82/100
Review scores
Source	Rating
AllMusic	4/5 stars
Consequence	B
IZM	4/5 stars
The Line of Best Fit	7/10
Q	4/5 stars
Record Collector	4/5 stars
Uncut	8/10

A Hermitage was well received by music critics. On review aggregator website, Metacritic, A Hermitage received an average rating of 82 out of 100 based on six professional critic reviews, indicating "generally favorable reviews". Adam Kivel of Consequence described the album as "experimental outfit blends traditional Korean music with sky-cracking post-rock." Alun Hamnett of Record Collector reviewed "Genuinely experimental, A Hermitage is a tremendously exciting release which demonstrates there is still new territory to be explored in heavier music; it need not always rely on tried and tested formulae."

== Track listing ==
No.	Title	Length
1.	"Wardrobe"	3:07
2.	"Echo of Creation"	4:21
3.	"For Everything That You Lost"	7:13
4.	"Abyss" (featuring Ignito)	7:05
5.	"Deus benedicat tibi"	4:29
6.	"The Mountain"	6:58
7.	"Naburak"	7:30
8.	"They Keep Silence"	6:24
