= Onda (album) =

Studio album by Jambinai
- Released: June 7, 2019
- Genre: Post-rock
- Length: 50:27
- Label: Bella Union

Jambinai chronology
| A Hermitage (2016) | Onda (2019) | Apparition (2022) |

Onda (Korean: 온다, stylized in all caps) is the third studio album by South Korean rock band Jambinai. It was released on June 7, 2019, by Bella Union. The album won the Best Rock Album at the 2020 Korean Music Awards.

== Background ==
Jambinai gained popularity in Europe, performing at the Glastonbury Festival, Hellfest, and Roskilde Festival, and pre-released the single Square Wave in 2018. The album's name Onda has a double meaning, "온다 (come)" in Korean, and means "wave" in Spanish.

== Critical reception ==
Professional ratings
Aggregate scores
| Source | Rating |
|---|---|
| Metacritic | 80/100 |
Review scores
| Source | Rating |
| AllMusic | 4/5 stars |
| IZM | 4/5 stars |
| PopMatters | 8/10 |
| The Skinny | 2/5 stars |
| Sputnikmusic | 4.2/5 |
| Uncut | 8/10 |

Onda was well received by music critics. On review aggregator website, Metacritic, Onda received an average rating of 80 out of 100 based on eight professional critic reviews, indicating "generally favorable reviews". Paul Simpson of AllMusic reviewed "Onda is both grander and more restrained than its predecessors, achieving a vast, wide-open sound that is equally focused and direct." Hans Kim of PopMatters described Onda as "a project that interweaves diasporic influences just as heterophony interweaves distinct melodies." The selection committee for 2020 Korean Music Awards Park Byeongwoon described the album as an electric performance of bursting sound, folk instruments that produce their own dynamics, and the performance added to it as a work that created a more dramatic scene beyond simple layers, and the album won the Best Rock Album.

| Publication | List | Rank | Ref. |
|---|---|---|---|
| Music Y | Album of the Year of 2019 | 1 | |

== Track listing ==
| No. | Title | Length |
|---|---|---|
| 1. | "Sawtooth" | 7:39 |
| 2. | "Square Wave" | 5:03 |
| 3. | "Event Horizon" | 3:55 |
| 4. | "Sun. Tears. Red." | 5:51 |
| 5. | "In the Woods" | 13:16 |
| 6. | "Small Consolation" | 5:18 |
| 7. | "ONDA Prelude" | 2:18 |
| 8. | "ONDA" | 7:07 |
