= People Who Stay Alone =

Studio album by Onnine Ibalgwan
- Released: June 1, 2017
- Genre: Indie rock
- Length: 47:05
- Label: Blue Boy
- Producer: Lee Seokwon

Onnine Ibalgwan chronology
Most Ordinary Existence (2008)	People Who Stay Alone (2017)

Singles from People Who Stay Alone
- 1. "Dancing Alone" Released: 17 December 2015

People Who Stay Alone (Korean: 홀로 있는 사람들; RR: Holo itneun saramdeul) is the sixth and final studio album by South Korean indie rock band Onnine Ibalgwan. The album was released on 1 June 2017. After the album, the band was disbanded, and frontman Lee Seokwon retired from the musician. South Korean singer-songwriter IU featured in the album's track, Everybody Knows the Secret (누구나 아는 비밀). The album was nominated for best modern rock album at the 2018 Korean Music Awards.

== Background ==
People Who Stay Alone has been recorded since 2010. Lee Seokwon interviewed to have been under great stress from the long recording period of the band's fifth album Most Ordinary Existence, and he targeted and worked on the band's sixth album as his last before retirement. He posted a story about his last album on his blog, he said "I wasn't comfortable with the broadcasting station and couldn't get used to being in front of the camera. I would like to you to listen to my last voice."

== Critical reception ==
Professional ratings
Review scores
Source	Rating
IZM	4/5 stars
Music Y	4/5 stars

Lee Kiseon of IZM reviewed "People Who Stay Alone kept this stance intact and added musical perfection to make the message shine." Kim Byeongwoo of Music Y said "People Who Stay Alone is both an end point and a starting point with the traces of Onnine Ibalgwan. The hearts that they started leading Onnine Ibalgwan are also clearly engraved on this album." The member of the selection committee for the Korean Music Awards Choi Jiho described the album as a "People Who Stay Alone, which was announced as the last work, highlights the values of Onnine Ibalgwan with well-refined productions."

Publication	List	Rank	Ref.
Music Y	Album of the Year of 2017	2	

== Track listing ==
No.	Title	Length
1.	"Shake Your Body Move Your Mind" ("너의 몸을 흔들어 너의 마음을 움직여")	3:45
2.	"Sun Shines Over the Window" ("창밖엔 태양이 빛나고")	6:26
3.	"Everybody Knows the Secret" ("누구나 아는 비밀") (featuring IU)	4:13
4.	"What's Heart" ("마음이란")	4:48
5.	"Condolences" ("애도")	6:02
6.	"Bad Dream" ("나쁜 꿈")	5:46
7.	"Time We Won't Miss Forever" ("영원히 그립지 않을 시간")	4:27
8.	"People Who Stay Alone" ("홀로 있는 사람들")	5:45
9.	"Dancing Alone" ("혼자 추는 춤")	5:53
