= Zeonpasa =

South Korean progressive rock band

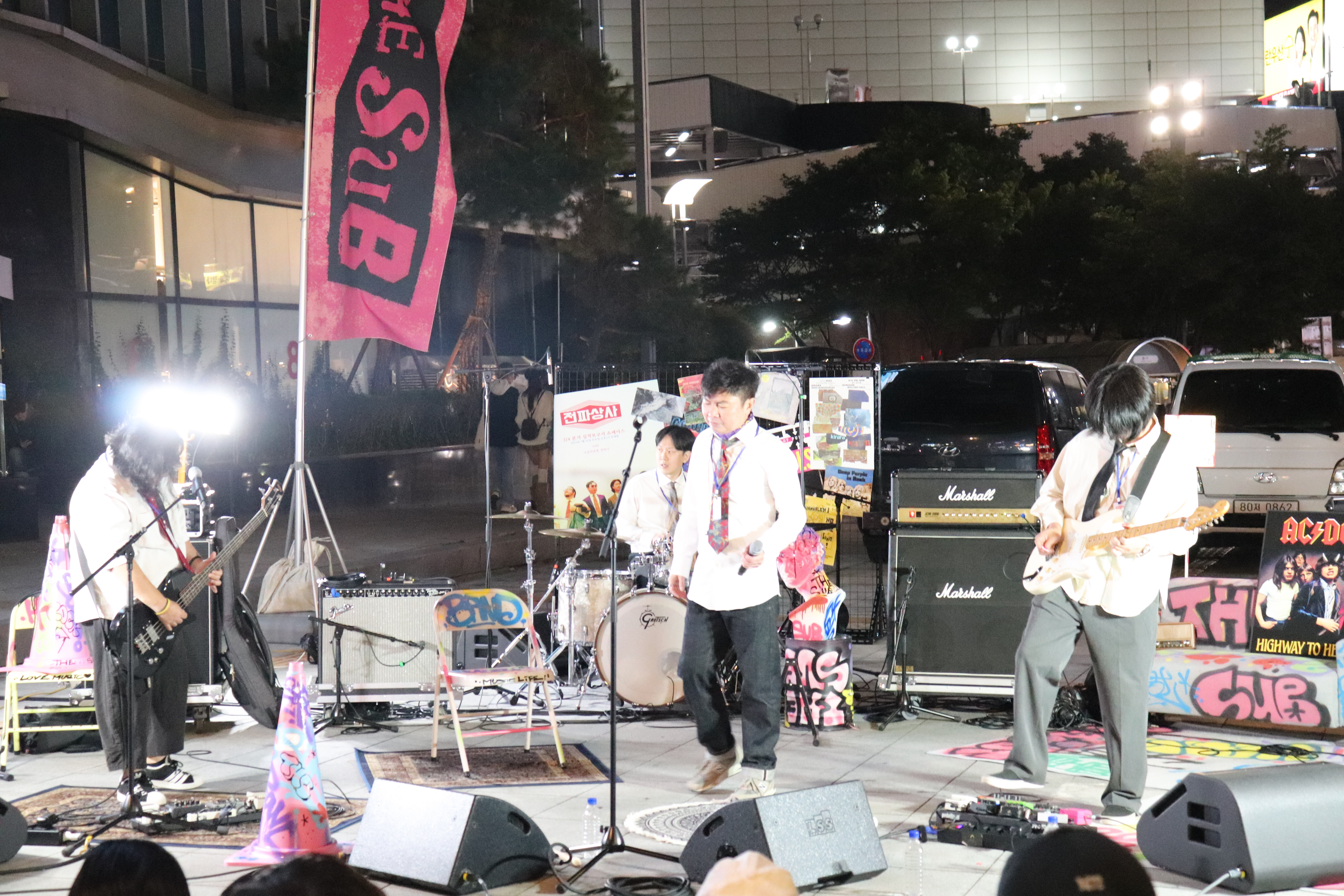
- Zeonpasangsa performing at The Sub Festival 2023

Background information
- Also known as: Zeonpasangsa
- Origin: Seoul, South Korea
- Genres: Progressive rock; math rock
- Years active: 2019-present
- Label: Mirror Ball Records
- Members: Kim Daein; Yoon Sunghoon; Kang Minseok; Im Won-hee (member of Zeonpasangsa)

Zeonpasa (Korean: 전파사) is a South Korean progressive rock band. The band currently consists of Kim Daein, Yoon Sunghoon and Kang Minseok. Since their formation in 2019, the band has released a studio album Psyche of Eons (억겁의 싸이-키) (2021). The album was nominated for Best Rock Album at the 2022 Korean Music Awards. They have also been working as a band called Zeonpasangsa (Korean: 전파상사), which was joined by South Korean actor Im Won-hee as a vocalist for the band from 2022.

== Career ==
Zeonpasa was formed in 2019, with Kim Daein being a member of Apollo 18 and Pakk, and Yoon Sunghoon and Kang Minseok being members of Modsdive. They released their first full-length album Psyche of Eons (억겁의 싸이-키) in 2021. Jeonjainhyeng of Music Y reviewed "Psyche of Eons gives the band a pleasure out of clise and satisfies both genre charm and curiosity for listeners", and the album was named the first place of Album of the Year in 2021. The album was nominated for Best Rock Album, and the track The Lie (거짓말) nominated for Best Rock Songs at the 2022 Korean Music Awards.

In 2022, actor Im Won-hee went to see the band's performance, and the band that suggested him a vocalist. Zeonpasa released their single Shinbam (신바람) with him in September 2022, and later formed a project band Zeonpasangsa in the form of Im Won-hee participating as a vocalist in the band. Zeonpasangsa's album Second Quarter Earnings Report (2/4분기 실적보고서) was released in 2023.

== Discography ==
=== Studio albums ===
- Psyche of Eons (억겁의 싸이-키) (2021)

=== EPs ===
- Second Quarter Earnings Report (2/4분기 실적보고서) (2023) (as Zeonpasangsa)
