= Chilgasal =

Studio album by Pakk
- Released: 21 October 2021
- Genre: Post-rock; post-metal
- Length: 49:22
- Label: Mirrorball Music
- Producer: Pakk

Pakk chronology
Salpoori (2017)	Chilgasal (2021)

Chilgasal (Korean: 칠가살; Hanja: 七可煞) is the second studio album by South Korean post-rock band Pakk. The album was released on 21 October 2021. The album was nominated the Best Rock Album at the 2022 Korean Music Awards.

== Background ==
The name of the album was influenced by Chilgasal, the seven punishment types that the Heroic Corps regulated as a part of the independence movement and the liquidation of pro-Japanese group during the Japanese occupation. The track in the album Infectious Gest (손 (損)) is a song about the COVID-19 pandemic, which depicts the COVID-19 as a guest who has damaged everything.

== Critical reception ==
The selection committee for the Korean Music Awards Kim Seongdae described the album as "the album that digs into the dark and humid social aspects of Korea and accuses them by music", and nominated the album to the 2022 Best Rock Album.

== Track listing ==
No.	Title	Length
1.	"Contagion" ("여역 (癘疫)")	2:17
2.	"Prematurely" ("요 (夭)")	6:02
3.	"Pseudo" ("사 (似)")	4:33
4.	"Infestation" ("충 (蟲)")	6:43
5.	"Brutal White" ("참 (獑)")	5:41
6.	"Charging Innocence" ("판 (判)")	4:29
7.	"Infectious Gest" ("손 (損)")	6:03
8.	"Entreat" ("도 (禱)")	9:21
9.	"Ritual for Contagion" ("여제 (癘祭)")	4:13
