= Idiotape =

South Korean electronic music band

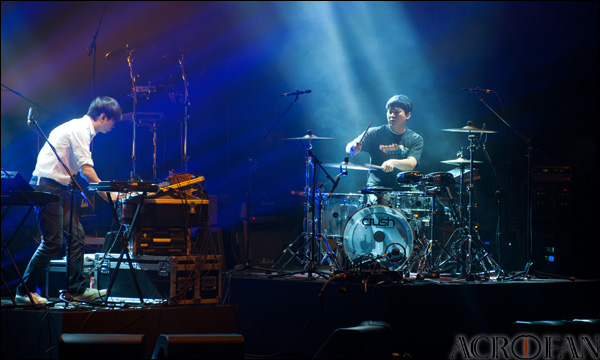
- From left: Dguru and DR at Cho Yong-pil 19th New Album Release 'Hello' Showcase 2013.

Background information
- Origin: South Korea
- Genre: Electronica
- Years active: 2010–present
- Label: DRDR AC
- Members: Dguru; Zeze; DR
- Website: idiotape.com

Idiotape is a South Korean electronic music band. They released their debut EP 0805 in July 2010 and their first album 11111101, a year later, which won "Best Dance & Electronic Album" at the 2012 Korean Music Awards. They have performed at multiple music festivals at home and around the world.

== History ==
=== Formation and members ===
The members are Dguru (producer and deejay), Zeze (synth) and DR (drums).

The band was initially formed in 2007, when members Dguru and Zeze met in the Seoul club scene, and started the band with a guitarist, who later left. The current band was formed in 2010, when drummer DR, formerly of the Seoul pop punk, pop rock band Sugar Donut, joined them.

Their name is a combination of the words "idiot" and "tape", which combined, minus one "t", also produced "idiot" and "ape"; and is a reflection of their nostalgia for cassettes, which they grew up with, and the use of analog equipment, which they favored.

=== Sound and influence ===
They were influenced by Korean classic rock from the 1960s and 1970s, and a wide range of bands, including The Doors, Radiohead, Metallica and Pantera. They are known for their analog sound, but still credit their rock influences. During a 2014 interview with WNUR-FM's Danny Hwang in Chicago Zeze said, "We for starters, began because we wanted to do electronic music, make an electronic band. But generally, in a way, I don't think we're too different from the average rock band. It's just that sounds we like happen to be synthesizers or other electronic instruments and I think we make the music we like using those instruments. And we try not to limit ourselves in terms of the sound or genre. It's more like we're doing whatever we want to do."

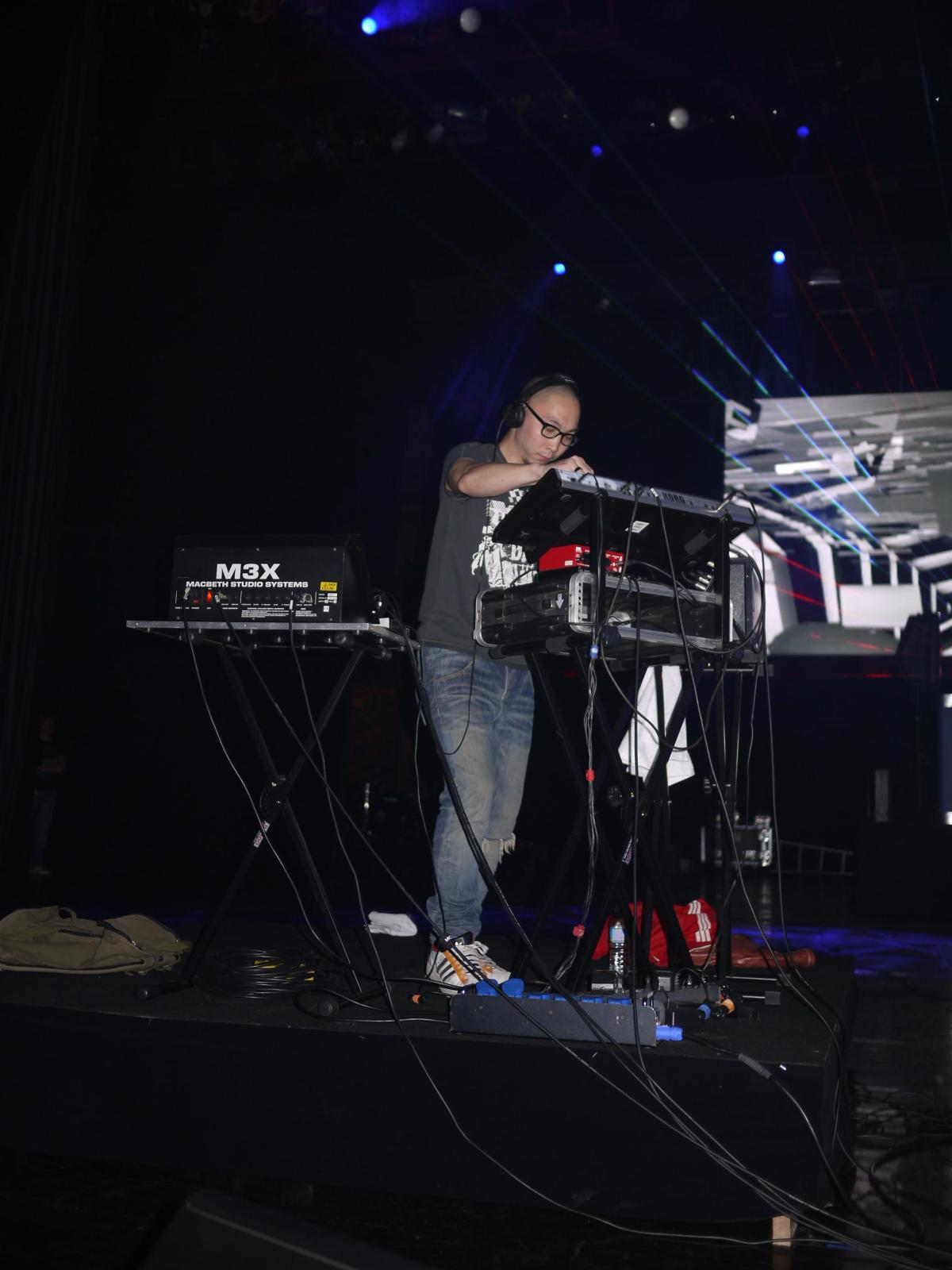
Zeze at Global Gathering 2010.

=== Touring and festivals ===
In March 2011, they were part of the first group of Seoulsonic bands, along with Vidulgi OoyoO and Galaxy Express, who performed at the Canadian Music Week in Toronto and SXSW in Austin, Texas, following up with a U.S. tour, including concerts in New York (The Knitting Factory) and Los Angeles (The Roxy). They performed at SXSW again in 2014 at K-Pop Night Out at SXSW. They have also opened for Fatboy Slim at Global Gathering Korea and performed at other festivals, including, the Pentaport Rock Festival, Glastonbury Festival, Exit Festival, Rencontres Trans Musicales, Summer Sonic Festival, Future Music Festival, Fusion Festival, Paléo Festival, Mundial Festival Netherlands, FMM Sines, Ansan Valley Rock Festival, Midem, and Ultra Korea 2016.

== Discography ==
=== Studio albums ===
Title	Album details	Peak chart positions
Title	Album details	KOR
11111101	Released: November 11, 2011; Label: VU Records; Formats: LP, CD, digital download	66
Tours	Released: July 30, 2014; Label: VU Records; Formats: CD, digital download	53
Dystopian	Released: June 16, 2017; Label: HIGHGRND; Formats: CD, digital download	43
Subhuman	Released: November 11th, 2026; Label: CAM	

=== Extended plays ===
Title	Album details	Peak chart positions
Title	Album details	KOR
0805	Released: July 13, 2010; Label: VU Records; Formats: CD, digital download	—
RE	Released: April 20, 2016; Label: VU Records; Formats: CD, digital download	50
"—" denotes release did not chart.

== Awards and nominations ==
Year	Award	Category	Nominated work	Result	Ref.
2012	Korean Music Awards	Best Dance & Electronic Album	11111101	Won	
