= Hollow Jan =

South Korean post-rock band

- Origin: Seoul, South Korea
- Genres: Post-rock; post-hardcore; screamo
- Years active: 2003-present
- Labels: Dope Entertainment
- Members: Lim Hwan taek; Kim kyung Chan; Lee Kwang jae; Jung woo yong; Choi Hyun Jin

Hollow Jan (Korean: 할로우 잰) is a South Korean rock band. Since their formation in 2003, the band has released two studio albums: Rough Draft in Progress (2006) and Day Off (2014). Their album Rough Draft in Progress won Best Rock Album at the 2008 Korean Music Awards.

== Career ==
Hollow Jan was formed in October 2003. They released the EP Hyacinthus Orientalis of Purple in 2005. The band expressed themselves as a "two-job (a newly coined Korean term in 2000s that refers to people who have multiple careers)" band because all the members are also working in office jobs.

In 2006, they released their first studio album Rough Draft in Progress. The album won the Best Rock Album at the 2008 Korean Music Awards. They were included in the lineup for the 2009 Pentaport Rock Festival and the 2012 Jisan Valley Rock Festival.

They released their second album Day Off in 2014. The member of the selection committee for the Korean Music Awards Lim Heeyoon nominated the album for best rock album, describing it as "An album like an auditory detail depicting a tumult on the verge of extinction." In 2015, they appeared and performed on The EBS space with Urban Zakapa.

In 2023, they released an EP titled Confusion (다떠위다).

== Discography ==
=== Albums ===
- Rough Draft in Progress (2006)
- Day Off (2014)

=== Extended plays ===
- Hyacinthus Orientalis of Purple (2005)
- Confusion (다떠위다) (2023)
- 'An Inaudible Voice' (2024)
