= Psyche of Eons =

Studio album by Zeonpasa
- Released: September 30, 2021
- Genre: Progressive rock, math rock
- Length: 67:22
- Label: Mirrorball Music

Zeonpasa chronology
Psyche of Eons (2021)	Second Quarter Earnings Report (2023)

Psyche of Eons (Korean: 억겁의 싸이-키; RR: Oekgeobeui Ssaieki) is the debut studio album by South Korean progressive rock band Zeonpasa. The album was released on 30 September 2021.

== Critical reception ==
Jeonjainhyeong of Music Y reviewed "Psyche of Eons refers to the energy that runs to the end with their genre techniques based on a sense of support at the same time, accepting new legacies of the past. It gives the band a pleasure out of clise and satisfies both genre charm and curiosity for listeners," and the album was named first place on the album of 2021. The member of the selection committee for the Korean Music Awards Seong Woojin described the album as "Psyche of Eons is unfamiliar and reluctant at first, but it is a feast of old-fashioned restaurants rock sounds that you enjoy once you taste them and dip various sauces: such as psychedelic rock, post-rock, and old songs." and the album was nominated for best rock album, and the track The Lie (거짓말) was nominated for best rock song.

Publication	List	Rank	Ref.
Music Y	Album of the Year of 2021	1	

== Track listing ==
No.	Title	Length
1.	"Night Market" ("야시장")	5:28
2.	"Elephant" ("코끼리")	6:56
3.	"The Lie" ("거짓말")	9:32
4.	"Sudden Shower" ("소나기")	6:51
5.	"Full Moon" ("보름달")	4:16
6.	"Asura" ("아수라")	7:30
7.	"Mirage" ("신기루")	6:02
8.	"Psyche" ("싸이키")	7:34
9.	"Bian Lian" ("변검술")	10:08
10.	"108" ("일공팔")	3:05
