= Lang Lee =

South Korean indie folk musician

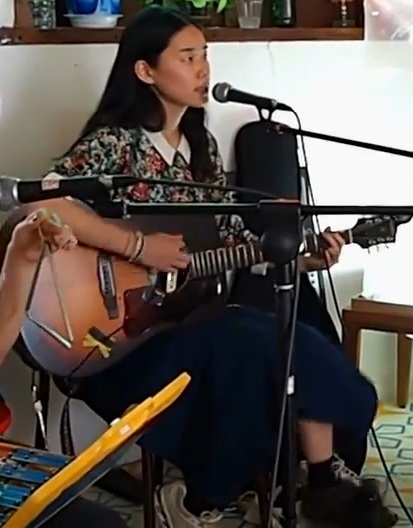

Background information
- Born: January 5, 1986 (age 39)
- Origin: Seoul, South Korea
- Genres: Indie folk, folk-pop
- Years active: 2011–present
- Labels: Your Summer; Somoim

Lang Lee (Korean: 이랑; born January 5, 1986) is a South Korean indie folk singer-songwriter, composer and author. She has released three albums: Yon Yonson (욘욘슨) (2012), Playing God (신의 놀이) (2016) and There is a Wolf (늑대가 나타났다) (2021).

== Career ==
Lang Lee was born in Seoul in 1986. She majored in film production at the Korea National University of Arts and started music with the recommendation of singer-songwriter Vad Hahn. She composed the music for the 2011 short film Byeonhaeya Handa.

Her first studio album Yon Yonson (욘욘슨) was released in 2012. Park Eunseok of the Korean Music Awards described the album as "The album surprised critics with its methodology that couldn't be more opposing while sensuous electronica is the mainstream trend", and nominated the album's track You Don't Even Know It Well (잘 알지도 못하면서) for the 2013 Korean Music Awards' Best Modern Rock Song.

She released her second album Playing God (신의 놀이) in 2016, with Sunkyeol's member Kim Kyeongmo as a producer. She also released a book of the same name with the release of the album. She won the Best Folk Song at the 2017 Korean Music Awards, and performed a celebration of immediately auctioning her trophy with her speech. Her actions caused controversy, but it was rated as a successful celebration as she gained public attention. In 2017, she had a concert with her close musician Minhwi Lee in Paris.

In 2020, she released a new single The Generation of Tribulation (환란의 세대). In 2021, she released her third studio album There is a Wolf (늑대가 나타났다), and she performed at The EBS space. The album won Album of the Year and the Best Folk Album at the 2022 Korean Music Awards. In 2022, she composed the soundtrack for More, a documentary film about drag artists.

== Discography ==
=== Solo studio albums ===
- Yon Yonson (욘욘슨) (2012)
- Playing God (신의 놀이) (2016)
- There is a Wolf (늑대가 나타났다) (2021)
