= Bosudong Cooler =

South Korean indie rock band

- Origin: Busan, South Korea
- Genres: Indie rock, indie folk
- Years active: 2017–2025
- Members: Seulhan Goo; Minji Kim; Sangwon Lee; Woongyu choi
- Past members: Juri Jung; Yanggang Lee

Bosudong Cooler (Korean: 보수동쿨러) is an indie rock/folk rock band based in Busan, South Korea. Its members are Minji Kim (guitar, vocals), Seulhan Goo (guitar, backing vocals), Sangwon Lee (bass), and Woongyu choi (drums).

The group formed in 2017 and has released one full-length album, Sand (2021), three singles—"Kill Me" (2018), "Cotton" (2018), and "We Live in the Jurassic Park" (2020)—and one extended plays, Yeah, I Don't Want It (2019).

Sand was nominated for Best Modern Rock Album at the 2021 Korean Music Awards. The band released a collaboration EP Love Sand (2022) with their fellow band Hathaw9y.

== Band members ==
Current members

- Minji Kim – vocals, guitar (2020–present)
- Seulhan Goo – guitar, backing vocals (2017–present)
- Sangwon Lee – bass guitar (2019–present)
- Woongyu Choi – drums (2017–present)

Former members

- Juri Jung – vocals, guitar (2017–2020)
- Yanggang Lee – bass guitar (2017–2018)

== Discography ==
=== Albums ===
Title	Details
Sand	1st full length: Released: 30 November 2020; Formats: LP, CD, digital download

=== Extended plays ===
Title	Details
Yeah, I don't want it.	Released: 28 June 2019; Formats: EP, CD, digital download
Love Sand	Released: 8 August 2022; Formats: digital download

=== Singles ===
Title	Year
Kill Me	2018
Cotton	2018
We Live in the Jurassic Park	2020
James	2023
Betty	2023

=== Music videos ===
- "Kill me" (2018)
- "Cotton" (2018)
- "0308" (2019)
- "We live in the Jurassic Park" (2020)
- "Sand" (2021)
- "O Rang Dae" (2021)

== Awards and nominations ==
Year	Award	Category	Nominated work	Result
2021	Korean Music Awards	Best Modern Rock Album	Sand	Nominated
