= Jambinai =

Korean post-rock band

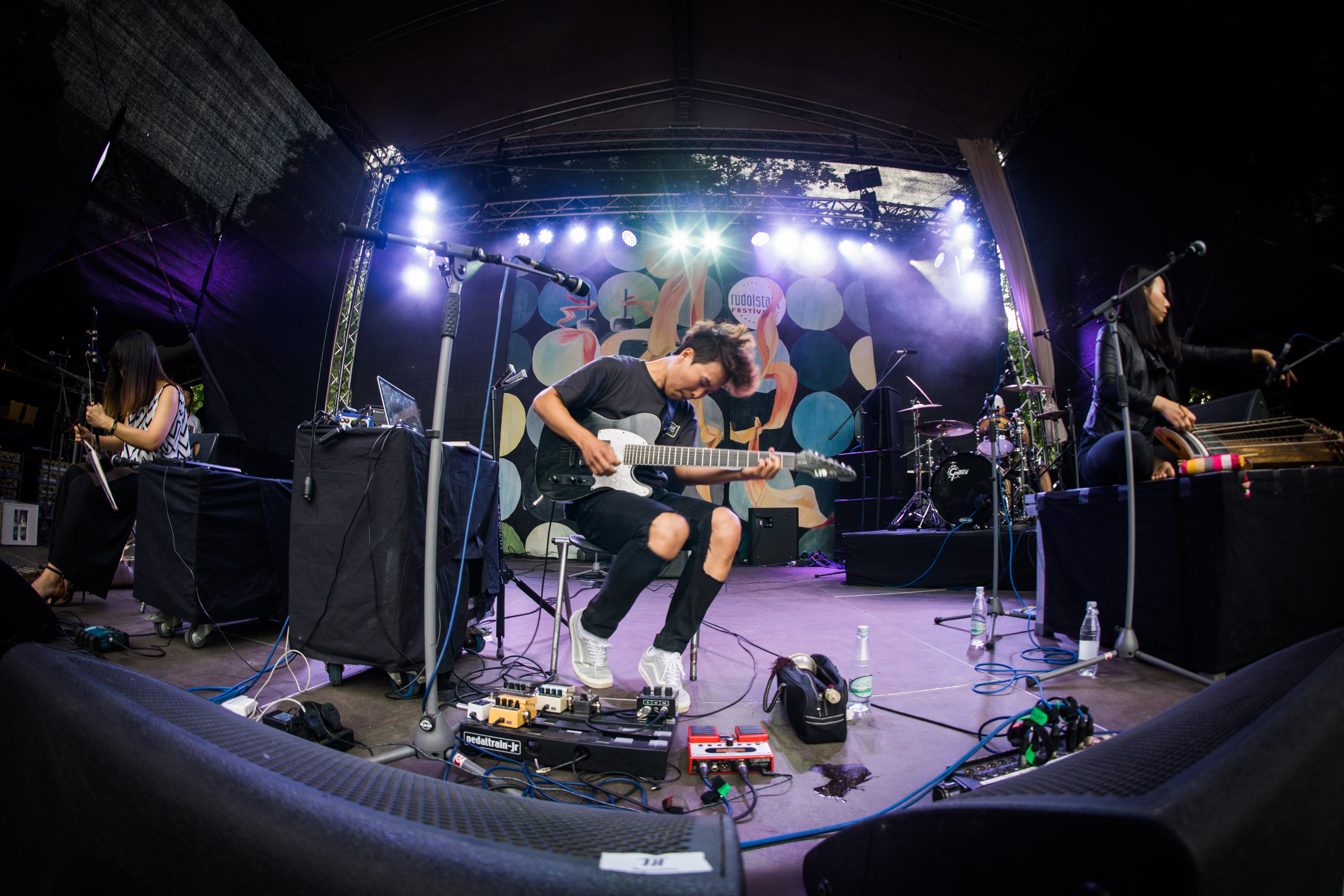
- Jambinai at Rudolstadt-Festival 2016

Background information
- Also known as: 잠비나이
- Origin: Seoul, South Korea
- Genres: Post-rock, experimental rock, Korean folk
- Years active: 2009–present
- Labels: The Tell-Tale Heart; Bella Union
- Members: Kim Bo-mi; Lee Il-woo; Sim Eun-yong; Yu Byeong-koo; Choi Jae-hyuk
- Website: Jambinai Facebook

Jambinai (Korean: 잠비나이) are a South Korean post-rock band formed in Seoul in 2009. The band currently consists of Kim Bo-mi, Lee Il-woo, Sim Eun-yong, Yu Byeong-koo and Choi Jae-hyuk. Their debut album Différance won the award for Best Crossover Album at the 2013 Korean Music Awards. Their second album Hermitage was released in 2016 on Bella Union.

During the 2018 Winter Olympics closing ceremony in Pyeongchang, Jambinai performed with an orchestra of geomungo players.

== Musical style ==
Jambinai are known for combining rock music instrumentation (drums, bass guitar, electric guitar) with the use of traditional Korean folk music instruments (haegeum, piri, geomungo). Furthermore, they have been compared to bands like Explosions in the Sky, Godspeed You! Black Emperor, and Mogwai.

== Members ==
- Kim Bo-mi – haegeum, vocals
- Lee Il-woo – electric guitar, piri, taepyeongso, vocals
- Sim Eun-yong – geomungo, vocals
- Yu Byeong-koo – bass guitar, backing vocals
- Choi Jae-hyuk – drums

Touring musicians

- Ryu Myung-Hoon – drums
- Ok Ji-hoon – bass guitar
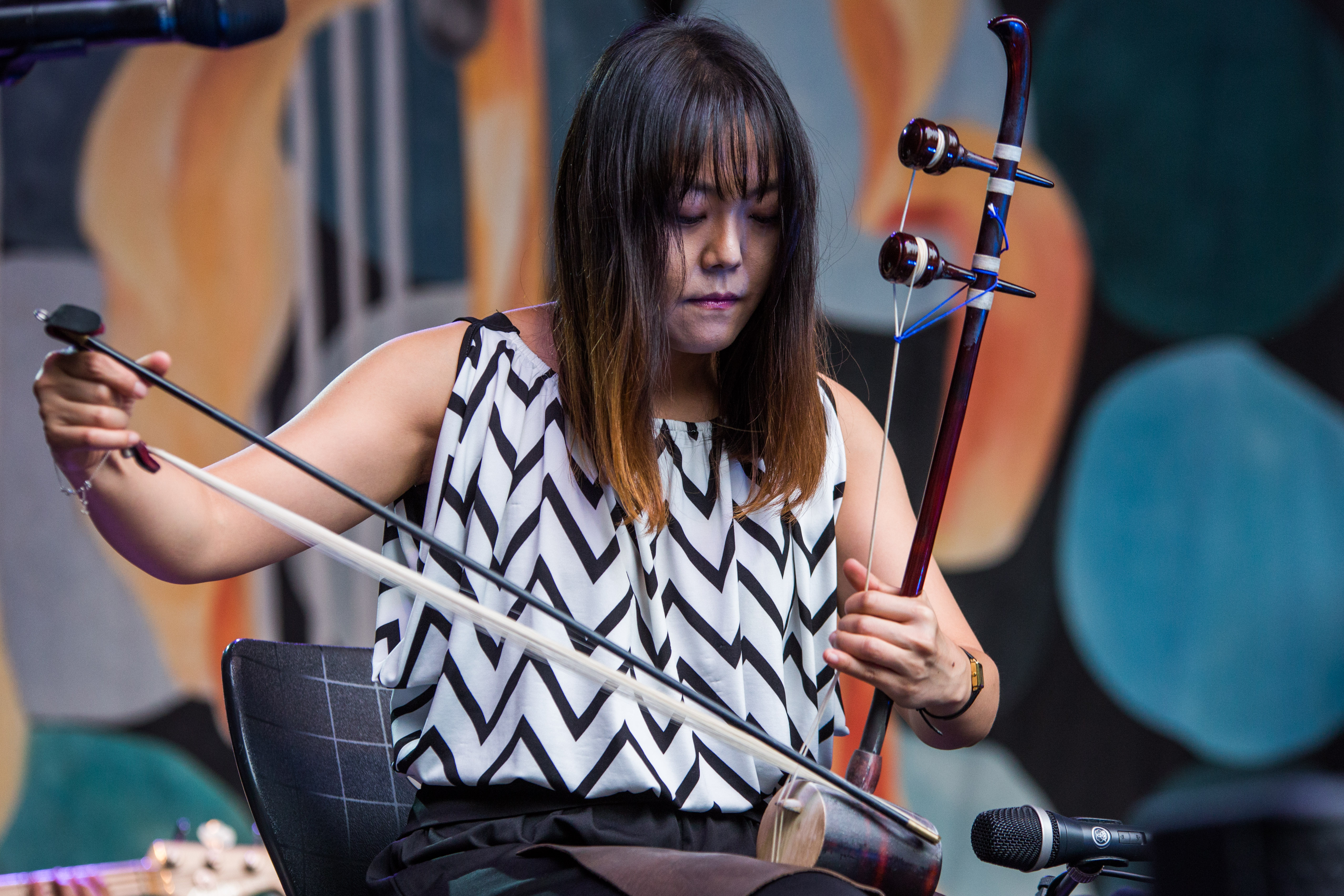
Kim Bo-mi playing the haegeum

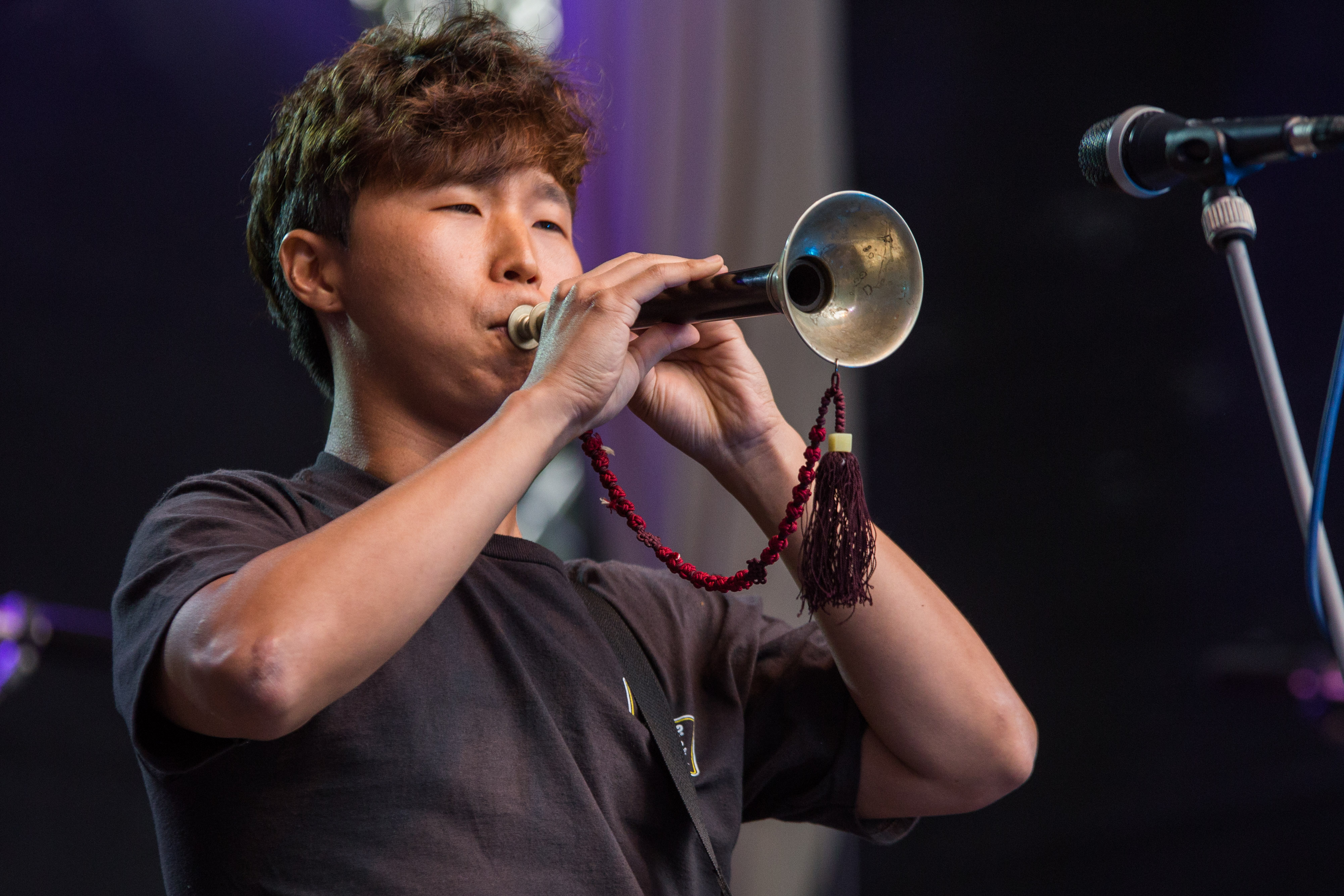
Lee Il-woo playing the taepyeongso

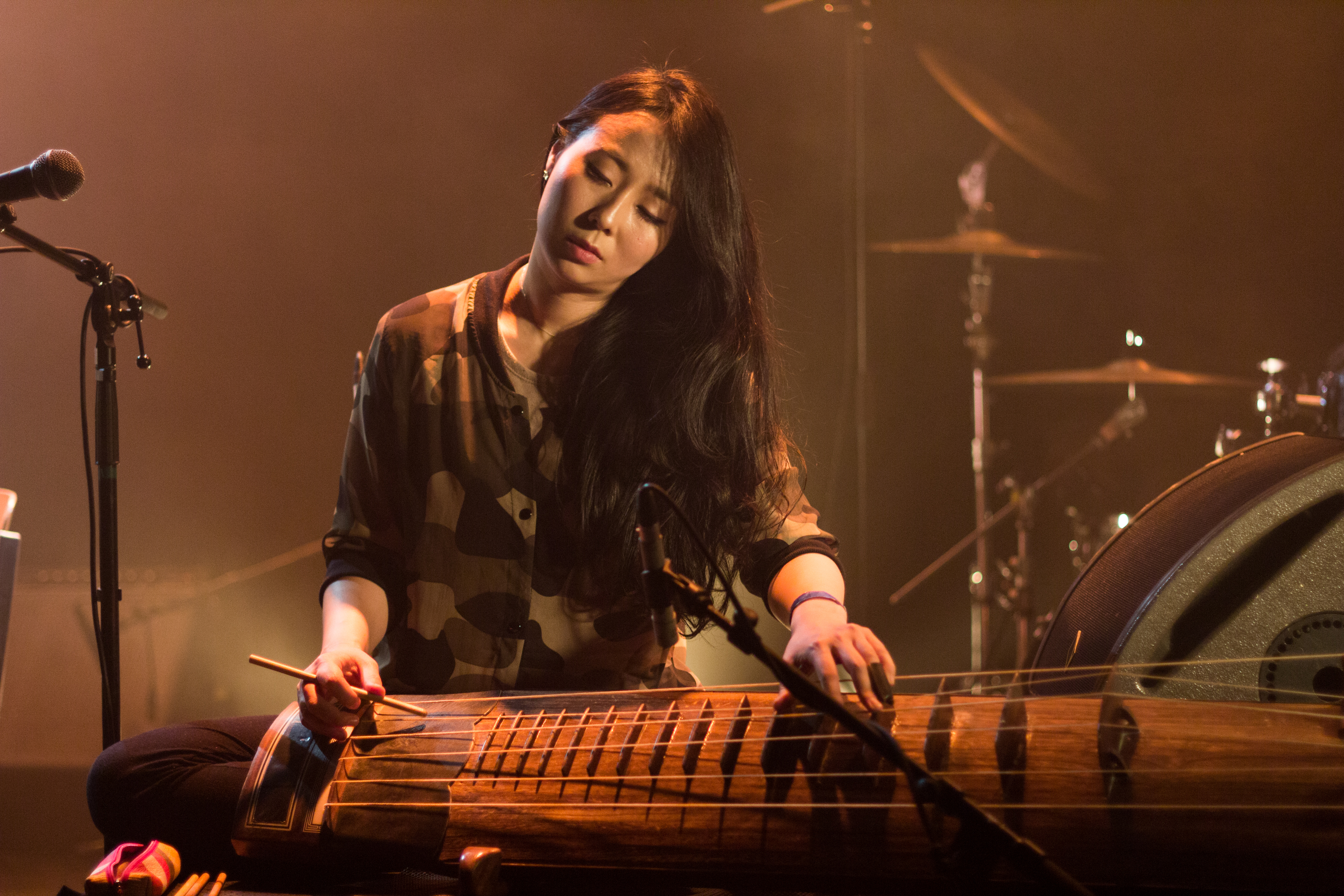
Sim Eun-yong playing the geomungo

== Discography ==
Studio albums

- Différance (2012) on GMC Records
- A Hermitage (2016) on Bella Union
- ONDA (2019) on Bella Union

EPs

- Jambinai (2010) on GMC Records
- Apparition (2022) on Bella Union

== Awards and nominations ==
Year	Award	Category	Nominated work	Result	Ref.
2013	Korean Music Awards	Best Crossover Album	Différance	Won	
2013	Korean Music Awards	Best Jazz & Crossover Performance	Différance	Nominated	
2015	Korean Music Awards	Committee Choice Special Award	—N/a	Won	
2017	Korean Music Awards	Best Rock Album	Hermitage	Nominated	
2020	Korean Music Awards	Best Rock Album	ONDA	Won	
2020	Korean Music Awards	Best Rock Song	"ONDA"	Won	
