= Wings of the Isang =

South Korean post-rock band

- Origin: Seoul, South Korea
- Genres: post-rock
- Years active: 2011-present
- Labels: LOCH Arts & Music; Mirror Ball Records
- Members: Moon Jeongmin; Lee Choonghoon; Kim Taebong; Jeon Minkyoo
- Past members: Ha Taejin; Kim Jinwon

Wings of the Isang (Korean: 이상의날개) is a South Korean post-rock band. The band currently consists of Moon Jeongmin, Lee Choonghoon, Kim Taebong and Jeon Minkyoo. Since their formation in 2011, the band has released two studio albums Stream of Consciousness (의식의흐름) (2016) and The Borderline Between Hope and Despair (희망과 절망의 경계) (2021). They won the Best Modern Rock Album in 2017 and 2022 Korean Music Awards.

== Career ==
Wings of the Isang were formed in 2011. The band began with the duo band Detuned Radio, later they recruited additional members and re-founded the band. They tried to name the band Wings (날개) at first, but they changed it to the current band name because friends around them called it related to Yi Sang's novel The Wings. They released the EP Lost in 2011. In 2014, they were named the Hello Rookie of the Month in The EBS space.

In 2016, they released their first studio album Stream of Consciousness (의식의흐름). The album won the Best Modern Rock Album and was nominated for Album of the Year at the 2016 Korean Music Awards. In 2017, they released the single No Longer Human (인간실격) inspired by the novel No Longer Human by Osamu Dazai.

In 2021, they released their second studio album, The Borderline Between Hope and Despair (희망과 절망의 경계). Yoo Seongeun of Music Y, described the album's track Twenty Years Old (스무살) as "It is a song where you can feel the belief in unfolding the narrative that only Wings of the Isang can do without wavering without letting go of the passage of time and the emotion of loss", the track was nominated for Best Modern Rock Song at the Korean Music Awards. And the album won Best Modern Rock Album.

== Discography ==
=== Studio albums ===
- Stream of Consciousness (의식의흐름) (2016)
- The Borderline Between Hope and Despair (희망과 절망의 경계) (2021)

=== EPs ===
- Lost (상실의시대) (2011)
- The Story of You and Me (너와 나의 이야기) (2013)
