= Weiv =

South Korean online magazine

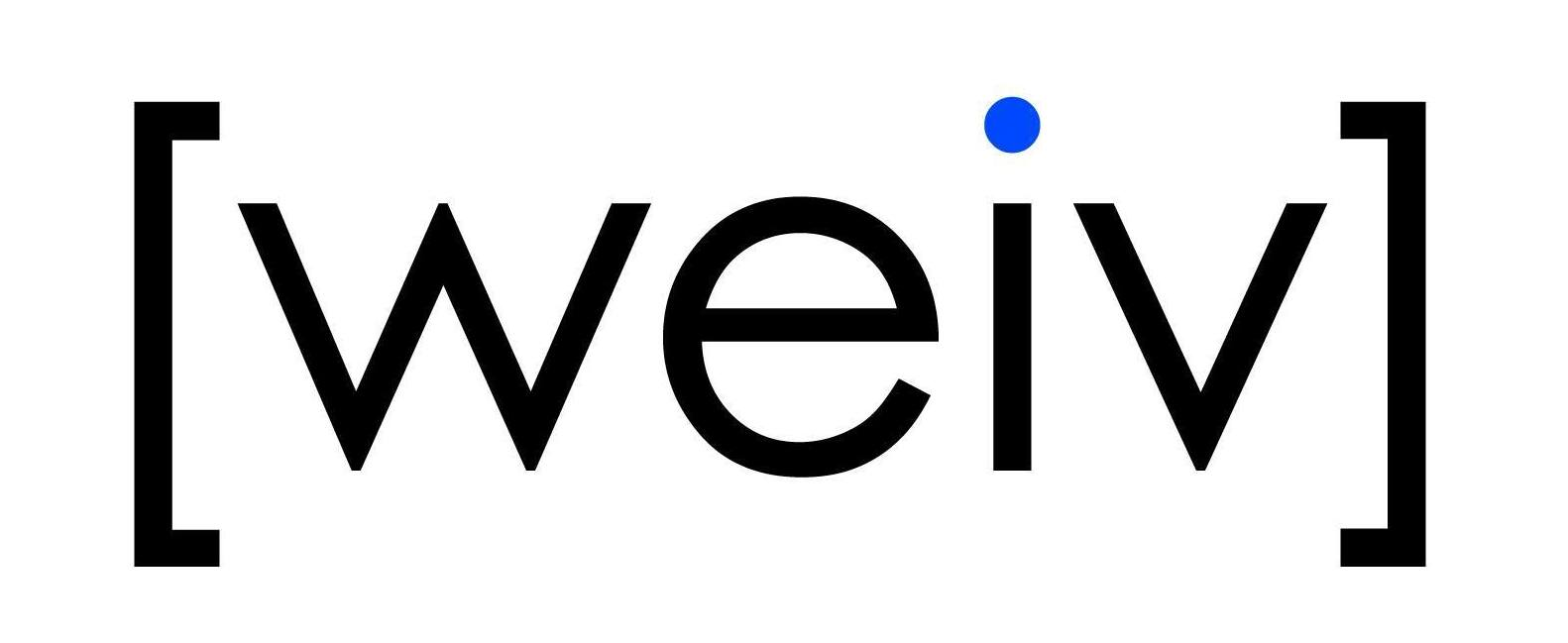
- Website type: Online magazine
- Available in: Korean
- Owner: Jeong Koo-won
- Creator: Shin Hyeon-joon
- Website: weiv.co.kr
- Launched: 1999
- Current status: Active

Weiv (Korean: 웨이브, stylised in [weiv]) is a South Korean online magazine that publishes music reviews, articles, and interviews with artists. The webzine was founded in August 1999 by Shin Hyeon-joon, a professor at Sungkonghoe University, and Choi Min-woo, the second owner, is also a member of the judge for the Korean Music Awards. The webzine's editor Mimyo is the chief editor of Idology.
