= Music Y =

South Korean online magazine

- Website type: Online magazine
- Available in: Korean
- Owner: Cho il-dong
- Creator: Cho il-dong
- Website: musicy.kr
- Launched: 2006 (unofficial); 2014 (official)
- Current status: Active

Music Y (Korean: 음악취향Y) is a South Korean online magazine that publishes music reviews, articles, and interviews with artists. The magazine was officially founded in 2014, and was previously an unofficial webzine in the form of a Naver cafe where critics gathered since 2006. The chief editor Cho il-dong is the main judge of the Korean Music Awards. The editors of the magazine both participated as members of the selection committee in the 100 Korean popular music albums, 2007 edition organised by Kyunghyang Shinmun, and the 2018 edition organised by The Hankyoreh and Melon.

== Annual report ==
=== Album of the Year ===
| Year | Artist | Album (first place) | Source |
|---|---|---|---|
| 2006 | Mowg | Journal | |
| 2007 | Hollow Jan | Rough Draft in Progress | |
| 2008 | Verbal Jint | Framed | |
| 2009 | Seoul Electric Band | Life Is Strange | |
| 2010 | Crash | The Paragon of Animals | |
| 2011 | Idiotape | 11111101 | |
| 2012 | Lowdown 30 | 1 | |
| 2013 | Sunwoo Jung-a | It's Okay, Dear | |
| 2014 | 9 and the Numbers | Treasure Island | |
| 2015 | E Sens | The Anecdote | |
| 2016 | Wings of the Isang | Stream of Consciousness | |
| 2017 | Pakk | Salpoori | |
| 2018 | Dark Mirror Ov Tragedy | The Lord Ov Shadows | |
| 2019 | Jambinai | Onda | |
| 2020 | ABTB | daydream. | |
| 2021 | Zeonpasa | Psyche of Eons | |
| 2022 | 250 | Ppong | |
| 2023 | O'Domar | Propaganda X | |
| 2024 | Soumbalgwang | Fire & Light | |
| 2025 | Lee Chan-hyuk | EROS | |

=== Rookie of the Year ===
| Year | Artist | Album (first place) | Source |
|---|---|---|---|
| 2007 | Galaxy Express | Ramble Around | |
| 2008 | Deb | Parellel Moon | |
| 2009 | Phonebooth | The Way To Live On | |
| 2010 | TV Yellow | Strange Ears | |
| 2011 | Neon Bunny | Seoulight | |
| 2011 | Bye Bye Badman | Light Beside You | |
| 2012 | Busker Busker | Busker Busker 1st Album | |
| 2013 | Kim Oki | Cherubim's Wrath | |
| 2014 | Kim Sa-wol X Kim Hae-won | Secret | |
| 2015 | Billy Carter | Billy Carter | |
| 2016 | Bolbbalgan4 | Red Planet | |
| 2017 | Se So Neon | Summer Plumage | |
| 2018 | Airy | Seeds | |
| 2019 | Sogumm | Sobrightttttttt | |
| 2020 | Yukika | Soul Lady | |
| 2021 | Oait | oa!t | |
| 2022 | 250 | Ppong | |
| 2023 | Min Soo Hong | Triviality | |
| 2024 | Kim Sun Bin | Where I Come From ? | |
| 2025 | Peach Truck Hijackers | Peach Truck Hijackers | |

=== Single of the Year ===
| Year | Artist | Single (first place) | Source |
|---|---|---|---|
| 2008 | Kiha & The Faces | "Cheap Coffee" | |
| 2009 | Broccoli, You Too? | "Song is Universal" | |
| 2010 | Hot Potato | "Propose" | |
| 2011 | MC Meta and DJ Wrecks | "Mookkakkihi" | |
| 2012 | Psy | "Gangnam Style" | |
| 2013 | Cho Yong-pil | "Bounce" | |
| 2014 | Soyou X Junggigo | "Some" | |
| 2015 | E Sens | "The Anecdote" | |
| 2016 | Savina & Drones | "Don't break your heart" | |
| 2017 | Red Velvet | "Red Flavor" | |
| 2018 | Mommy Son | "Mommy Jump" | |
| 2019 | Jclef | "Mama, See" | |
| 2020 | Leenalchi | "Tiger is Coming" | |
| 2021 | Budung | "Guess Who?" | |
| 2022 | NewJeans | "Attention" | |
| 2023 | NewJeans | "Ditto" | |
| 2024 | Danpyunsun and the Moments Ensemble | "Independent" | |
| 2025 | Lee Chan-hyuk | "Endangered Love" | |
