= 1st Korean Music Awards =

2004 awards in South Korea

The first edition of the Korean Music Awards was held on March 17, 2004, recognizing music released in 2003. The event was organized by Munhwa Ilbo and Cultural Action, with support from KT, the Korea Sports Promotion Foundation, and KTF. It originated from a perception in early 2003 that South Korea's popular music industry was facing a crisis. A selection committee was formed in September of the same year, and the awards ceremony was announced on February 23, 2004.

Nominees were selected through an initial review by the selection committee and announced on February 28. Following the announcement, online voting was conducted. Hosted by Kim Kwang-jin and Lee Sang-eun, the ceremony took place at the 600th Anniversary Hall at Sungkyunkwan University. Despite Asoto Union, Big Mama, and Loveholics receiving the most nominations (4 each), no artist won more than once. The event was broadcast live by OhmyNews and Music City, while Mnet aired a recorded version. On April 2, a public forum was held to gather opinions about the event. While the ceremony faced some criticism, it was praised for challenging conventional, politically motivated music awards organized by broadcasting companies.

== Background ==
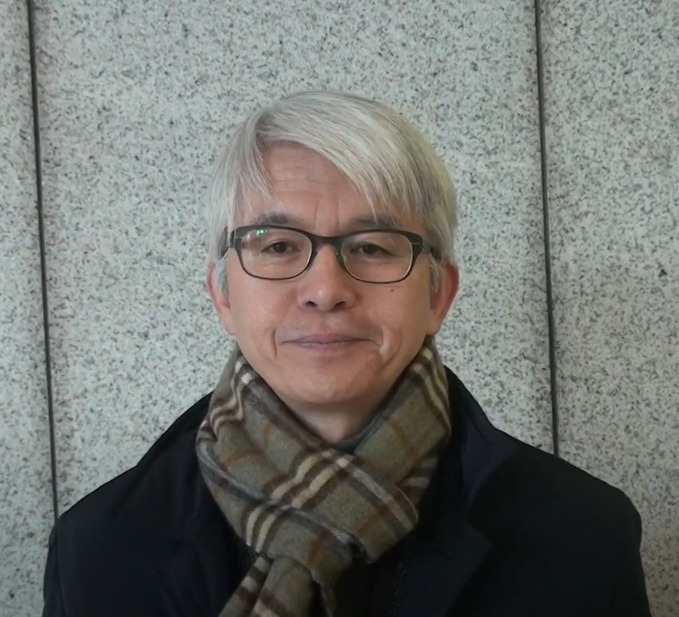
Selection Committee Chair Kim Chang-nam

Discussions about an alternative music awards ceremony, distinct from those held by broadcasting companies, began in early 2003. Kim Chang-nam, a professor at Sungkonghoe University, stated that the event began with "an awareness that our popular music is in a serious crisis, both culturally and industrially."

In early September 2003, the Coalition for the Reform of Popular Music (hereafter referred to as CRPM) held discussions to address issues surrounding the existing seven music awards ceremonies, (Note: This refers to the KBS Music Awards, MBC Ten Singers Music Festival, SBS Gayo Daejeon, KMTV Music Awards, Mnet Music Video Festival, Sports Seoul's High1 Seoul Music Awards, and the Golden Disc Awards presented by Ilgan Sports and the Korea Music Content Association.) deliberating on issuing statements about these problems during the year-end, a time when many of these ceremonies were held. In the subsequent meeting, participants agreed to establish an award focused on music rather than commercial considerations, supported by sponsors and media partnerships. Cultural Action, a civic organization, brought together individuals, leading to the first meeting of the selection committee in late September. During this meeting, a 17-member selection committee was formed, including Kim Chang-nam as chair, alongside critics, journalists, and radio producers. The committee reached a consensus on establishing a new award for popular music. At the time, discussions included Munhwa Ilbo's role in securing sponsorships and Cultural Action's participation. At this time, the name of the awards ceremony had not been finalized, and they temporarily used the title 'Korean Good Music Awards' (Korean Good Music Awards, KGMA).

During the second meeting, the general award categories and selection principles were discussed. However, due to difficulties in securing sponsorship, financial challenges arose. In January 2004, some members of the organizing committee suggested that only the results chosen by the judges should be disclosed to the public. Despite this, KT's sponsorship was ultimately secured, and additional support was provided by the National Sports Promotion Corporation and KT Freetel. Following this, on February 23, 2004, the organization held a press conference and announced that the inaugural Korean Popular Music Awards would take place on March 17, 2004, at Sungkyunkwan University's 600th Anniversary Hall. The event was intended to be modeled after the Grammy Awards.

The selection committee chair, Kim Chang-nam, explained the purpose of the event as creating a ceremony that would "guarantee the quality of music and ensure objective authority," moving away from the tokenistic music awards typically held by broadcasting companies. Regarding the selection of candidates, the awards would be centered around albums and songs rather than individual artists, focusing on the quality of the work rather than sales figures. Im Jin-mo, a member of the selection committee, remarked during the press conference that unlike the 1980s, when there was consensus on award winners among both experts and fans, the current state of the music industry, where artists like Lee Hyori dominate, creates a sense of emptiness for both experts and fans. Lee Dong-yeon, another member of the selection committee and a member of the Culture and Social Research Institute at the Culture Solidarity, expressed that one of the goals of the event was to overcome the formal dichotomy of mainstream vs. alternative and popular vs. specialized music.

== Ceremony ==
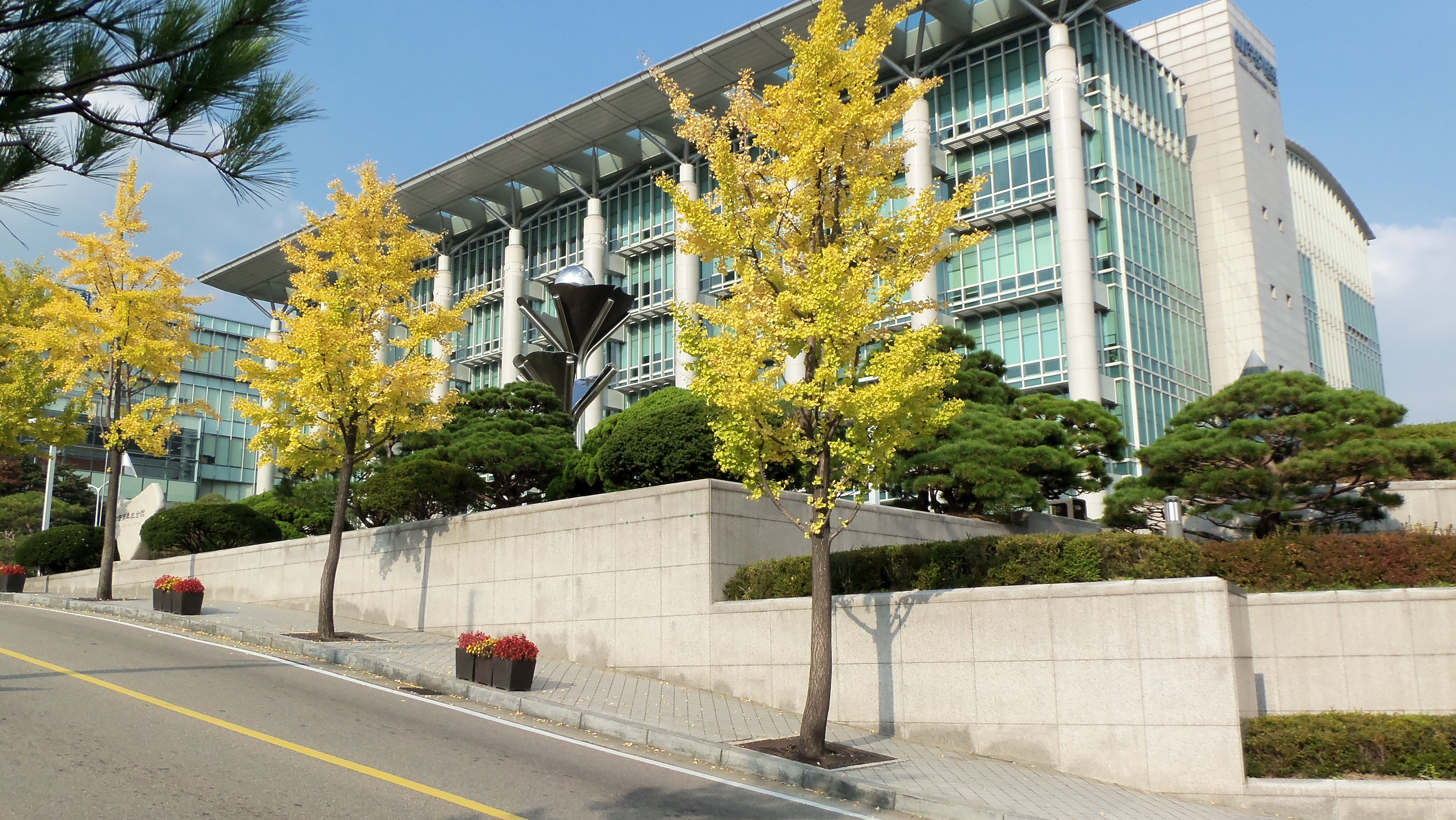
The ceremony was held at Sungkyunkwan University's 600th Anniversary Hall.

The nominees for the ceremony were announced on February 28, 2004. While five nominees were standard for each category, six albums were nominated for Album of the Year due to a tie, and Blue Dawn was additionally nominated for Rookie of the Year based on unanimous agreement following a committee member's suggestion. Online voting began after the nominees were announced and continued until the day before the ceremony, March 16. Results from the selection committee and online voting were weighted 80% and 20%, respectively. According to Lee Dong-yeon, many first-round nominees were artists recommended by netizens.

The ceremony took place on March 17, 2004, at Sungkyunkwan University's 600th Anniversary Hall. Kim Kwang-jin served as the male host, while Lee Sang-eun was selected as the female host after considering candidates such as Lee So-ra and Kim Yoon-ah. The event, which lasted two and a half hours, was divided into two parts and included 14 award categories. A total of 12 performances were held, including Cocore's opening act and Lee Jung-sun's closing act, all without performance fees. Presenters included Han Dae-soo, Kang San-ae, Ahn Heung-chan, Joo Sang-kyun, Jeon Yu-seong, and Jung Hye-won of Coloring Baby 7 Princesses. The selection committee established a principle of conducting a revote when the score difference between the top and remaining candidates was within one point. As a result, revotes occurred in categories such as Album of the Year (The The Band, Florist, Like the Bible), Female Artist of the Year (Lee Sang-eun, BoA, Lee Soo-young), Male Artist of the Year (Cho Yong-pil, Wheesung), and Best Rock Music (Cocore, Nell). The Special Jury Award, originally intended for one recipient, was given to two: Asoto Union and Jeon Kyung-ok, following committee discussions.

The ceremony emphasized its non-commercial nature, distributing approximately 400 invitations to the public on a first-come, first-served basis via the official website. The event was broadcast live on OhmyNews and Music City, and a recorded version aired on Mnet.

== Nominees and winners ==
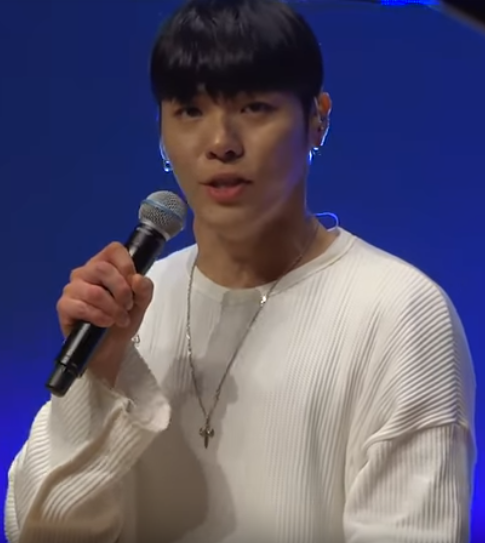
Wheesung (pictured) won the Male Artist of the Year award.

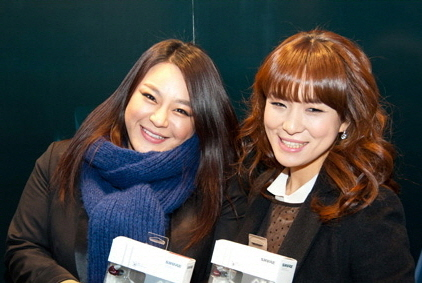
Big Mama (pictured) was nominated in four categories, including Artist of the Year – Group and Album of the Year.

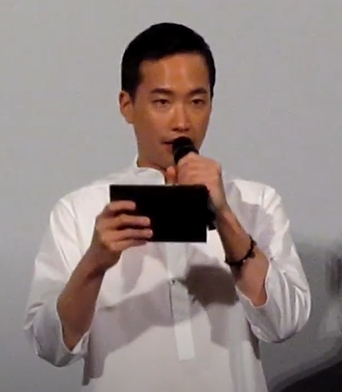
Jung Jae-il (pictured) won the New Artist of the Year award and was nominated for Song of the Year for "Tears Flower."

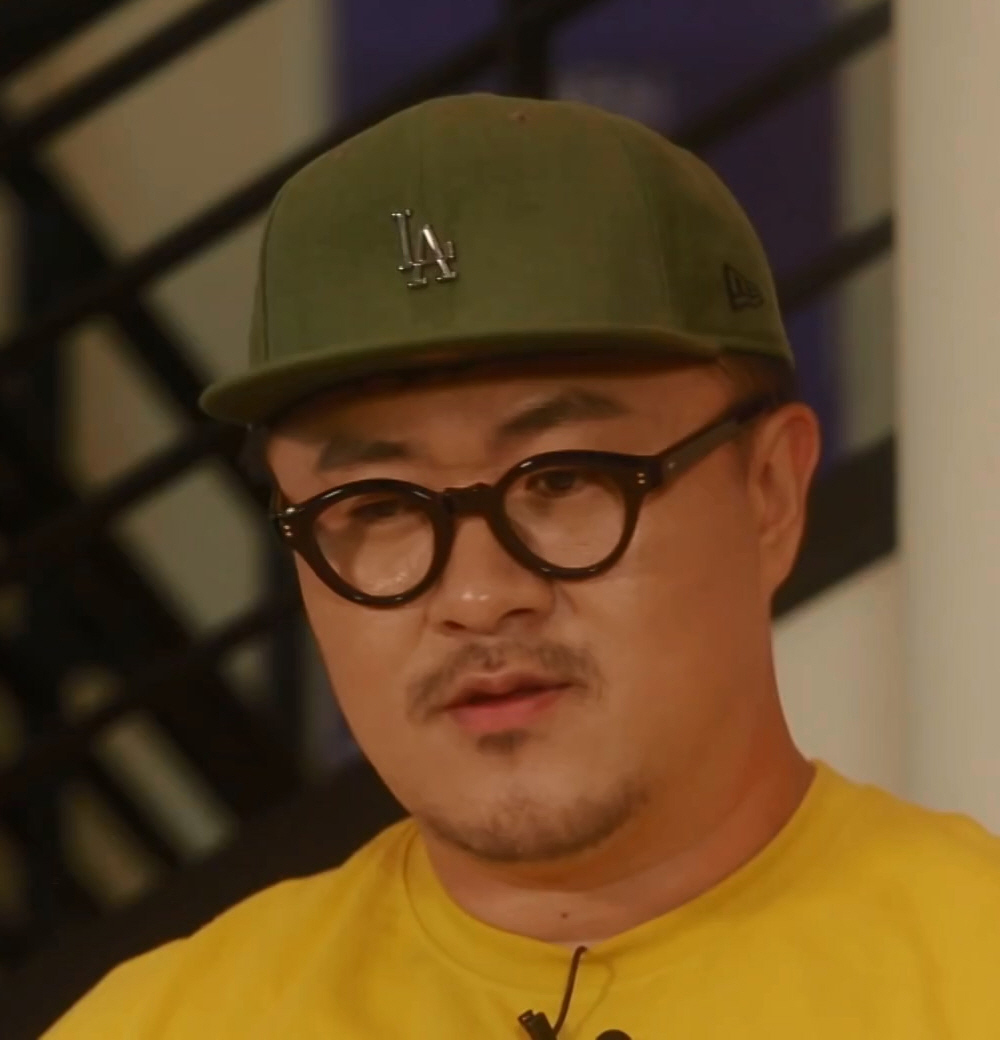
Defconn (pictured) won the Best Hip-Hop & Dance category.

Winners are listed first, highlighted in boldface, and indicated with a double dagger (‡).

**Album of the Year**: **The The – The The Band** (‡); Loveholics – Florist; Big Mama – Like the Bible; Asoto Union – Sound Renovates a Structure; Yi Sung Yol – This Day, At This Time....; Cocore – Super Stars	**Song of the Year**: **Loveholics – "Loveholic"** (‡); The The – "You"; Delispice – "Confession"; Yoon Gun – "By Chance"; Jung Jae-il – "Tear Flower"
**Male Artist of the Year**: **Wheesung** (‡); Yoon Gun; Yi Sung Yol; Lee Juck; Cho Yong-pil	**Female Artist of the Year**: **Lee Tzsche** (‡); BoA; Lee Soo-young; Han Young Ae; BMK
**Group of the Year**: **Big Mama** (‡); The The; Delispice; Loveholics; Asoto Union	**New Artist of the Year**: **Jung Jae-il** (‡); Big Mama; Asoto Union; Jeju Sonyeon; bluedawn; Tim
**Best Rock Album**: **Cocore – Super Stars** ‡; Nell – Let It Rain; Delispice – Espresso; Loveholics – Florist; Sweater – Humming Street	**Best Hip-Hop & Dance Album**: **Defconn – Lesson 4 the People** ‡; Drunken Tiger – Foundation; Leessang – Jae, Gyebal; Epik High – Map of the Human Soul; Joosuc – Superior Vol.1: This Iz My Life; MC Sniper – Intro
**Best R&B & Ballad Album**: **Yoon Gun – Yoon Gun** ‡; Big Mama – Like the Bible; Asoto Union – Sound Renovates a Structure; Jo Kyu-chan – Single Note; Wheesung – It's Real	**Best Crossover Album**: **Na Yoon-sun – Down By Love** ‡; Lee Byung-woo – Absorption; Jeon Gyeong-ok – Love Sick; DJ Soulscape – Lovers; JS Culture – Missing
**Best Film & Drama Music**: **Lee Byung-woo – Untold Scandal** ‡; Kim Jun-seok – Singles; Jo Yeong-wook – Oldboy; Bang Jun-seok – ...ing; Won Il – Sky Blue	**Best Label**: **Fluxus Music** ‡; Cabaret Sound; M-Boat
**Special Jury Award**: **Asoto Union** ‡; **Jeon Gyeong-ok** ‡	**Lifetime Achievement Award**: **Lee Jung-seon** ‡ (Note: The Munhwa Daily reported that the candidates for the Lifetime Achievement Award were Cho Yong Pil, Lee Jung Seon, and Han Dae Su, but only Lee Jung Seon is mentioned in the Korean Music Awards archive. The Korean Music Awards archive indicates that Lee Jung Seon won the award. In later years, Han Dae Su and Cho Yong Pil received the Lifetime Achievement Award in 2005 and 2006, respectively.)

== Nominees in multiple categories ==
=== Four nominations ===
- Loveholics
- Big Mama
- Asoto Union (Note: Asoto Union was nominated in four categories at the time of the nominations announcement but won the Special Jury Award at the ceremony.)

=== Three nominations ===
- The The
- Delispice
- Yoon Gun

=== Two nominations ===
- Jung Jaeil
- Lee Seung Yeol
- Cocore
- Wheesung

== Reactions and aftermath ==
Before the ceremony, Ohmynews' Ju Cheol-hwan expressed full understanding of the award's establishment purpose but raised concerns about "how the authenticity of popular music would be judged". Kim Chang-nam wrote in the Munhwa Ilbo that although there were many challenges in organizing the ceremony, "at least we have clearly and successfully made our first step". Jo Seong-jin, the editor-in-chief of Hot Music, pointed out issues with the small and unrepresentative selection committee compared to global awards like the Grammys and criticized the involvement of Cultural Action and the Munhwa Ilbo as the event's organizers. Kim Chang-nam acknowledged the criticism regarding the number of judges and the involvement of a media company, stating, "Who would sponsor an award ceremony run by civic groups?" He also mentioned that more genre categories, especially for heavy metal, would be considered in the future.

After the ceremony, on April 2, Cultural Action hosted a public debate. Ju Cheol-hwan, who participated, argued that discussions with the PD Association and other stakeholders were necessary, while Lee Jong-hyun, the former representative of Master Plan, criticized the serious tone of the ceremony, likening it to a "movement-based award ceremony". Seoul Newspaper's Park Sang-sook noted that the Korean Music Awards "brought a fresh wind" and served as a signal for the abolition of traditional music awards. Articles from Yonhap and Herald Economy also highlighted the positive reception of the Korean Music Awards in articles reviewing Korean music in 2004.
