= Siesta (disambiguation) =

A siesta is a short nap taken in the early afternoon, often after the midday meal.

Siesta may also refer to:

- Siesta (film), directed by Mary Lambert
- SIESTA (computer program), an ab-initio materials simulation software
- Prince Polo, a chocolate bar also sold under the name Siesta
- Siesta (album), an album by Zzzaam

== Places ==
- Siesta Key, Florida
- Siesta Beach, Florida
- Siesta Shores, Texas

== See also ==
- The Siesta (disambiguation)
