= High fashion (disambiguation) =

High fashion, or haute couture, is the creation of exclusive custom-fitted high-end fashion design.

High fashion may also refer to:

- High Fashion (film)
- "High Fashion" (Roddy Ricch song)
- "High Fashion" (Addison Rae song)

Haute couture may also refer to:

- Haute Couture (album)
- Haute Couture (EP)
