= My Aunt Mary =

South Korean pop rock band

- Origin: Seoul, South Korea
- Genres: Pop rock; jangle pop
- Years active: 1995-2009, 2022-present
- Labels: Fluxus Music
- Members: Jeong Soonyong; Han Jinyoung; Park Jeongjoon
- Past members: Lee Jeyoon

My Aunt Mary (Korean: 마이앤트메리) is a South Korean rock band. The band currently consists ofJeong Soonyong, Han Jinyoung and Park Jeongjoon. Since their formation in 1995, the band has released 5 studio albums My Aunt Mary (1999), 2002 Rock n' Roll Star (2001), Just Pop (2004), Drift (2006) and Circle (2008). They are known as the first generation of Korea's leading indie band along with Onnine Ibalgwan and Delispice.

== Career ==
My Aunt Mary was formed in 1995 by an indie club in Hongdae called Drug. They tried to name the band "Oggi Gomo (옥이 고모)" which was influenced by the actual name of the vocalist Jeong Soonyong's aunt, but they were worried that the band looked humorous so they changed to name the band My Aunt Mary.

They released their self-titled debut studio album My Aunt Mary in 1999. In 2001, they released their second album, 2002 Rock n' Roll Star. in 2004, founding member Lee Jeyoon left the band to study abroad, and the band made a song called 공항 가는 길 for him.

In 2005, they released their third album, Just Pop. The album received critical acclaim and won the 2005 Korean Music Awards's Album of the Year. It also ranked 71st on the all-time Korean album 100 list.

In 2008, they released their fifth album, Circle, and hosted two concerts, "First Circle" and "Another Circle". After 2009, the band has had a temporary hiatus. Jueong Soonyong has released solo songs under the name Thomas Cook, and Han Jinyoung has joined the Yellow Monsters as a bassist.

In 2022, they announced a reunion, and in 2023, they released EP Right Now. They joined the lineup of Korean rock festivals such as the DMZ Peace Train Music Festival.

== Discography ==
=== Albums ===
- My Aunt Mary (1999)
- 2002 Rock n' Roll Star (2001)
- Just Pop (2004)
- Drift (2006)
- Circle (2008)

=== Extended plays ===
- Right Now (2023)
