= Munhwa =

Munhwa (Hangul: 문화, Hanja: 文化) means "culture" in Korean.

It may refer to:

- Munhwa Broadcasting Corporation, one of the leading South Korean television and radio networks.
- Munhwa Ilbo, a daily newspaper in South Korea.
- Munhwa Ryu, one of the great aristocratic houses of Goryeo and Joseon dynasty.
- Munhwaŏ (North Korean standard language), the North Korean standard version of the Korean language.
