= Gongjoong Doduk (album) =

Studio album by Gongjoong Doduk
- Released: February 9, 2015
- Genre: Psychedelic folk; psychedelic pop; folktronica; neo-psychedelia
- Length: 32:05
- Label: Foundation
- Producer: Gongjoong Doduk

Gongjoong Doduk chronology
| Gongjoong Doduk (2015) | Crumbling (2019) |

Gongjoong Doduk (Korean: 공중도덕) is the debut studio album by South Korean musician Gongjoong Doduk, currently called Mid-Air Thief. The album was released on 9 February 2015. The album was nominated for Best Modern Rock Album of the Year at the 2016 Korean Music Awards.

== Background ==
Gongjoong Doduk debuted under the name Hyoo in 2012, and worked on everything by himself when making his first studio album. Starting with this album, he changed his style of music to folktronica.

== Critical reception ==
Jeong Byeongwook of Music Y described Gongjoong Doduk as an "album like an eloquent speaker that talks according to the flow of consciousness, but does not confuse listeners with their elegant speech skills, but rather misleads them." Park Joonwoo of Weiv said: "The freshness created by guitars, vocals, and other sounds is still an inspiration to listeners a long time after the album was released."

| Publication | List | Rank | Ref. |
|---|---|---|---|
| Music Y | Album of the Year of 2015 | 7 | |
| Weiv | The best Korean albums of 2015 | N/A | |

== Track listing ==
| No. | Title | Length |
|---|---|---|
| 1. | "White Room" ("하얀방") | 4:24 |
| 2. | "Seismic" ("지진파") | 3:31 |
| 3. | "Parasol" ("파라솔") | 2:00 |
| 4. | "Woo" ("우") | 4:26 |
| 5. | "Swamp" ("늪지대") | 6:19 |
| 6. | "Moons" ("달들") | 3:04 |
| 7. | "Maybe" ("아마") | 1:18 |
| 8. | "The Knot" ("매듭") | 7:03 |
