= Deconstruction (Kim Changhyun album) =

Studio album by Kim Changhyun
- Released: 21 November 2017
- Genre: Jazz
- Length: 58:59
- Label: TAL

Kim Changhyun chronology
| Oblivion (2014) | Deconstruction (2017) | Representation (2018) |

Deconstruction (Korean: 해체; RR: haeche) is the studio album by South Korean jazz bassist Kim Changhyun. The album was released on 21 November 2017.

== Background ==
Kim Chang-hyun won the Best Jazz & Crossover Performance at the 2015 Korean Music Awards through EP Oblivion (망각) released in 2014, and performed several performances based on postcolonialism. Saxophonist Kim Seongwan and drummer Kim Seonki participated in the album as sessions, and TAL described it as a work that dismantles overlapping memories through the process of finding his identity and reconstructs emotions that have been ignored due to the imbalance of history.

== Critical reception ==
Kim Heejoon of MM Jazz described the album as the process of assimilation of performers according to the flow is naturally captured, so unlike the previous album, it is better to listen to the entire album continuously than to listen to separate tracks. Jazz Space selected it as one of the 15 best jazz albums of 2017, and described it as a work that shows that some of the disbanded organisations seek to reunite and that we are under each other's influence no matter how free.

== Track listing ==
| No. | Title | Length |
|---|---|---|
| 1. | "Deconstruction, pt. 1" | 1:22 |
| 2. | "Deconstruction, pt. 2" | 1:37 |
| 3. | "Deconstruction, pt. 3" | 2:51 |
| 4. | "Deconstruction, pt. 4" | 2:14 |
| 5. | "Deconstruction, pt. 5" | 3:05 |
| 6. | "Deconstruction, pt. 6" | 3:21 |
| 7. | "Deconstruction, pt. 7" | 2:39 |
| 8. | "Deconstruction, pt. 8" | 4:31 |
| 9. | "Deconstruction, pt. 9" | 2:51 |
| 10. | "Deconstruction, pt. 10" | 2:02 |
| 11. | "Deconstruction, pt. 11" | 2:57 |
| 12. | "Deconstruction, pt. 12" | 2:29 |
| 13. | "Deconstruction, pt. 13" | 2:43 |
| 14. | "Deconstruction, pt. 14" | 2:39 |
| 15. | "Deconstruction, pt. 15" | 3:01 |
| 16. | "Deconstruction, pt. 16" | 3:39 |
| 17. | "Deconstruction, pt. 17" | 3:41 |
| 18. | "Deconstruction, pt. 18" | 2:58 |
| 19. | "Deconstruction, pt. 19" | 2:34 |
| 20. | "Deconstruction, pt. 20" | 5:45 |
| Total length: | | 58:59 |
