= Garion (band) =

South Korean hip hop group

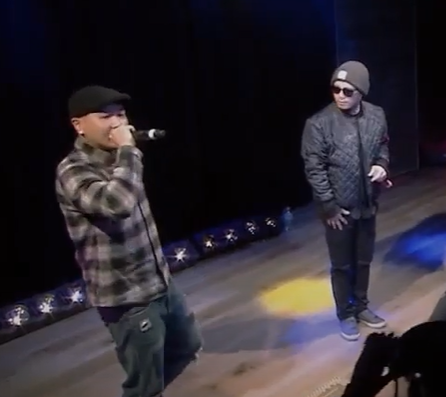

Background information
- Origin: South Korea
- Genre: Korean hip hop
- Years active: 1998-present
- Members: MC Meta; Naachal
- Past members: J-U

Garion (Korean: 가리온) is a South Korean hip hop group that pioneered Korea's underground hip-hop scene. The group currently consists of rappers MC Meta and Naachal. They are notable for rapping entirely in Korean.

== History ==
=== Debut ===
Garion formed in 1998 after Naachal and MC Meta met at a concert where MC Meta was performing as a member of the hip hop group Blex. They named themselves Garion after a mythical white horse with a black mane that lives in Mount Paektu. Producer J-U joined the group in November.

=== First album and first major award ===
Garion released their first album, Garion, in January 2004. Most songs on the album are from the group's hip hop club days in the 1990s and 2000s. The album was not a mainstream hit but received praise from Korea's underground hip-hop scene for its groundbreaking raps that were entirely in Korean. It was later chosen as one of the 100 "Masterpieces of Korean Popular Music."

In 2005, they released the single, "무투" ("Mutu"), which went on to win Best Hip Hop Song at the 2006 Korean Music Awards.

=== Second album ===
On June 24, 2010, it was officially announced that Garion will come back with their second album called Garion2 (가리온2) in August. Nevertheless, because of Naachal's health problem and MC Meta's personal problems, they announced that they are expecting to release their album in September and that DJ Skip became their new assistant DJ. The album was released in October. After the release, it was applauded by the masses and the two members actively held concerts. Before long, Naachal became a rap teacher in FnC academy and is teaching students until now. In 2011, Garion2 (가리온2) received 'The Best Album of the Year', 'The Best Hip-hop Album of the Year', and 'The Best Hip-hop song of the Year' in the Korean Music Awards. In 2012, MC Meta and Naachal became the founders of the crew 'Bulhanddang' (불한당, 不汗党).

== Members ==
=== MC Meta ===
MC Meta had many solo career for a long time and even continued after Garion was formed. He had some collaboration works with DJ Soulscape and Da Crew (다 크루). He often held a class in Haja Center and taught hip-hop. Some of these students made a label called Soul Company (소울 컴퍼니), and thinking MC Meta as a spiritual leader. From April 2011 to August, MC Meta released four singles, collaborated with DJ Wreckx. Before long, studio album was released and was also praised by the listeners.

=== Naachal ===
Naachal didn't have any solo careers until the release of 《Mutu(무투(武鬪)》. He was busy on his school but also there was a rumor that Naachal didn't prefer featuring on another track. He also had some bad health problems. However, after the release of 《Mutu(무투(武鬪)》, he participated in many songs and in May 2009, released a project album called Golden Boy Training Academy with Issac Squab.

=== J-U ===
J-U started his career as a producer in 1995 in Germany and when he returned to Korea, he participated in concerts in hip-hop club Honey. Then he moved to Club MP and met with MC Meta and Naachal. After his succession from Garion, people thought he quit his career as a producer.

== Discography ==
=== Albums ===
- Garion (2004)
- Garion 2 (2010)
- Garion 3 (2024)
- Garion 4(2026)

=== Mini albums ===
- 15th Anniversary Album (2013)
- 15th Anniversary Album (Instrumental) (2013)

=== Singles ===
- "무투" (2005)
- "그 날 이후" (2005)
- "거짓 2013" (2013)
- "Heritage" (2016)
- "이야기" (2016)

== Awards and nominations ==
=== Korean Music Awards ===
Year	Category	Nominated work	Result	Ref
2006	Best Hip Hop Song	"무투"	Won	
2011	Album of the Year	Garion 2	Won	
2011	Best Hip Hop Album	Garion 2	Won	
2011	Best Hip Hop Song	"Most Urgent" (feat. NUCK)	Won	

=== Hiphopplaya Awards ===
Year	Category	Nominated work	Result	Ref
2011	Album of the Year	DJ AND MC (by MC Meta & DJ WRECKX)	Nominated	
2011	Featuring of the Year	MC Meta	Nominated	
2014	Single of the Year	"YGGR" (by Illionaire Records feat. MC Meta)	Won	
2014	Single of the Year	"무언가" (by Huckleberry P feat. Ignito & MC Meta)	Nominated	
