= Seoul Electric Band =

South Korean indie band

- Origin: Seoul, South Korea
- Genres: psychedelic rock; indie rock
- Years active: 2003–2012, 2014–present
- Members: Shin Yoon Chul; Kang Daehee; Kim Elisa; Honnip
- Past members: Shin Suk Cheol; Lee Kitae; Park Jiman; Kim Jeongwook; Oh Hyeongseok; Son Kyeongho

Seoul Electric Band (Korean: 서울전자음악단; RR: Seoul jeonja eumakdan) is a South Korean rock band. The band currently consists of Shin Yoon Chul, Kang Daehee, Kim Elisa and Honnip. Since their formation in 2003, the band has released three studio albums: Turn Up the Volume (볼륨을 높여라; 2004), Life Is Strange (2009) and Hope It's a Dream (꿈이라면 좋을까; 2014).

== Career ==
Seoul Electronic Band was formed in 2003 by Shin Yoon Chul, who is the son of iconic Korean guitarist Shin Joong-hyun. At the time of formation, the band consisted of Shin, his younger brother Shin Seok Chul, and bassist Kim Jungwook. The band's name Seoul Electric Band was influenced by the Pyongyang Electronic Band (평양전자음악단) in Pyongyang. The band released their first album, Turn Up the Volume (볼륨을 높여라) in 2004.

They left Seoul to record their second album and spent two years living and recording in Gwangju, Gyeonggi. In 2009, they released their second album Life is Strange, and they won the 2010 Korean Music Awards for Rock Album of the Year, Musician of the Year, and Album of the Year.

They announced their disbandment in 2012, but regrouped two years later. In 2014, they released their third album, Hope It's a Dream (꿈이라면 좋을까). In 2019, the band members were reorganised into Shin Yoon Chul, Kang Daehee, Kim Elisa and Honnip. In 2023, they released the single Ghost Writer and won Best Rock Music at the Korean Music Awards 2024. In 2025 they released the single It Rains (비가 되어 내려).

== Discography ==
=== Albums ===
- Turn Up the Volume (볼륨을 높여라; 2004)
- Life Is Strange (2009)
- Hope It's a Dream (꿈이라면 좋을까; 2014)
