= Kim Changhyun =

South Korean jazz bassist

- Origin: South Korea
- Genres: Jazz, free jazz
- Label: The Arts Label

Kim Changhyun (Korean: 김창현) is a South Korean jazz bassist. He is a member of Neo Traditional Jazz Trio and Tiologue.

He released the album Reverberation (잔향) in 2012, and EP Oblivion (망각) in 2014. Oblivion was based on postcolonialism, and the album won the Best Jazz & Crossover Best Performance Award at the 2015 Korean Music Awards. He released the album Deconstruction (해체) in 2017, and Kim Heejoon of MM Jazz described the album as a free jazz work attempted by Kim Chang-hyun's long-talked-about awareness of the right shift in perception, being awake, and dealing with reality with a subjective gaze. He is a professor of music at Dankook University.

== Discography ==
=== Studio albums ===
- Reverberation (잔향) (2012)
- Deconstruction (해체) (2017)
- Representation (관념) (2018)
- Noise (소음) (2019)
- Absolute Distance (2023)

=== EPs ===
- Oblivion (망각) (2014)
- Intuition (직관) (2021)
- Contemplation (관조) (2021)
- Binary Connect (2022)
