= W.A.N.D.Y =

Studio album by Loro's
- Released: October 2, 2014
- Genre: Post-rock
- Length: 71:28
- Label: Mirrorball Records

Loro's chronology
Dream(s) (2009)	W.A.N.D.Y (2014)

W.A.N.D.Y (initialism for We Are Not Dead Yet) is the second studio album by South Korean post-rock band Loro's. The album was released on 2 October 2014. The album won Album of the Year at the 2015 Korean Music Awards.

== Background ==
Do Jaemyeong interviewed that the band recorded the band's second album after he was discharged from the military, but it took a long time. The band said the recording period was long, but that's why they were able to record in more detail. The album's track Senna is a tribute to Brazilian racing driver Ayrton Senna, who died in an accident at the age of 34.

== Critical reception ==
Professional ratings
Review scores
Source	Rating
IZM	3.5/5 stars

Na Wonyoung of Weiv reviewed, "Loro's explored their inner self with Pax and their dream with Dream(s), comes out of W.A.N.D.Y and explores you, us, the world, and the stories in it. The result of a long journey and the declaration that we are not dead are beautifully combined." The member of the selection committee for the Korean Music Awards Lee Kyeongjoon described the album as "W.A.N.D.Y maintained the superb view of post-rock presented by the first album Pax, but expanded its scope to progressive rock through post-britpop, and in the process, it showed smartness that did not fall into "the promiscuity arising from overdrive.""

== Track listing ==
No.	Title	Length
1.	"W.A.N.D.Y"	5:23
2.	"U"	6:20
3.	"A Place Where We Shall Meet" ("여기 우리가 만나는 곳")	4:38
4.	"Let's Dance" ("춤을 추자")	7:29
5.	"Undercurrent"	6:05
6.	"Homo Separatus"	7:19
7.	"Monster"	6:30
8.	"Babel"	5:10
9.	"Homevideo"	5:24
10.	"Senna"	3:30
11.	"We Are Not Dead Yet"	6:34
12.	"Hymn of Farewell" ("송가")	7:06
