= Mid-Air Thief =

South Korean musician

- Also known as: Hyoo; Gongjoong Doduk; Shadow Community; Bird's Eye Batang; Bird's Eye Thief
- Origin: South Korea
- Genres: Psychedelic pop; neo-psychedelia; folktronica; psychedelic folk
- Years active: 2012–present
- Labels: Foundation; Topshelf Records

- Mid-Air Thief
- Hangul: 공중도둑
- RR: Gongjung doduk
- MR: Kongjung toduk

Mid-Air Thief (Korean: 공중도둑) is a pseudonymous South Korean musician. He has released four studio albums: Gongjoong Doduk (2015), Crumbling (2018), Flood Format (2022), and Flash (2025), all released under different aliases. Crumbling won Best Dance & Electronic Album at the 2019 Korean Music Awards and garnered an online cult following for the artist.

Mid-Air Thief has stated that he refuses to disclose his age, birth name or place of residence. Additionally he has never shown his face, only letting himself be photographed while masked. As of 2025 he has never performed live under any of his known aliases. (Note: He talked about preparing and rehearsing with a live band in 2019, but no such thing manifested publicly.)

== Career ==
Mid-Air Thief started his career in 2012 using the stage name Hyoo (휴), releasing two mini albums that same year. His sound at this time has been compared to the output of Flying Lotus' record label Brainfeeder. It was under this alias that Mid-Air Thief signed to Foundation Records, a South Korean independent label in Seoul, for three years. In 2015, the project changed its name to Gongjoong Doduk (공중도덕, Public Morality) and released its self-titled debut album, which was nominated for Best Modern Rock Album at the 2016 Korean Music Awards. His name would change again to Mid-Air Thief (공중도둑) after finding out that rappers Dok2 and The Quiett released a song called "공중도덕" as part of the 2016 South Korean reality competition show, Show Me the Money 5.

In 2018, Mid-Air Thief released his second album, Crumbling, which features vocals and lyrics by South Korean singer Summer Soul. The album gained attention in online music communities. The cover art was made by Mid-Air Thief's nephew, a design major at Hongik University. Crumbling was nominated for both Album of the Year and Best Dance & Electronic Album at the 2019 Korean Music Awards, and won Best Dance & Electronic Album, something which displeased Mid-Air Thief as he didn't think the "Dance/Electronic" label fit the album. It was collaborator Summer Soul who accepted the award in Mid-Air Thief's name. The album was re-released for the U.S. in 2019 by Topshelf Records.

Using yet another alias, he released two songs ("Restless Song" and "Halcyon’s Coffin") under the group project Shadow Community at the end of 2019.

2021 saw the release of the sci-fi anime series Sonny Boy featuring exclusive music by Mid-Air Thief on its soundtrack.

The following years saw minimal interaction with the public—as of late 2025, the artist hasn't given a single interview since 2019. 2022 saw the release of Flood Format (손을 모아), via his Bandcamp page and under the name Bird's Eye Batang (새눈바탕). He would change his name once more, this time to Bird's Eye Thief (새눈도둑) for the release of Flash in 2025.

== Influences ==
Mid-Air Thief has spoken about being a big fan of British electronic musician Aphex Twin and Canadian singer-songwriter Andy Shauf. It was American producer Richard Swift that moved Mid-Air Thief to mix his music using an analogue mixer and master it using cassette tapes.

== Discography ==
Studio albums

| Title | Album details |
|---|---|
| Gongjoong Doduk (공중도덕; Gongjungdodeog) | Released: February 9, 2015; Label: Foundation, Topshelf Records; Format: Digital download, streaming, CD, cassette, LP |
| Crumbling (무너지기; Muneojigi) | Released: July 31, 2018; Label: Self-released, Topshelf Records; Format: Digital download, streaming, CD, cassette, LP |
| Flood Format (손을 모아; Soneul Moa) | Released: May 12, 2022; Label: Self-released, Botanical House; Format: Digital download, streaming, CD, LP |
| Flash | Released: October 22, 2025; Label: Self-released; Format: Digital download, streaming |

== Awards and nominations ==
| Year | Award | Category | Nominated work | Result | Ref. |
|---|---|---|---|---|---|
| 2016 | Korean Music Awards | Best Modern Rock Album | Gongjoong Doduk | Nominated | |
| 2019 | Korean Music Awards | Best Dance & Electronic Album | Crumbling | Won | |
| 2019 | Korean Music Awards | Album of the Year | Crumbling | Nominated | |
