= Glen Check (band) =

South Korean rock band

- Origin: Seoul, South Korea
- Genres: Electronic, indie
- Years active: 2011–present
- Labels: Soundholic, BANA
- Members: Kim June-one; Zayvo
- Past members: Kang Hyuk-jun; Ryu Jeon-yeol; Choe Tae-geun

Glen Check (Korean: 글렌체크) is a South Korean indie synth-pop band, consisting of Kim June-one (vocals, guitar) and Zayvo (guitar, synthesizer). They debuted in 2011 with the EP Disco Elevator, and released their first full-length album, Haute Couture, in 2012.

== History ==
Kim June-one (김준원) and former member Kang Hyuk-jun (강혁준) were both born in South Korea, but spent much of their childhoods abroad, listening mostly to Western music. They met after returning to South Korea, while attending Busan International High School, where they decided to pursue music as a career. After graduation, they formed a band called The Closure, which Kim later described as being "quiet and boring."

They changed the band's name to Glen Check, and began releasing electropop and synth-pop music, starting with their first EP, 2011's Disco Elevator. Their first full-length album, 2012's Haute Couture, was met with rave reviews from critics, and won Best Dance & Electronic Album at the 2013 Korean Music Awards. The band's second album, 2013's Youth!, also won Best Dance & Electronic Album the following year at the 2014 Korean Music Awards, and Billboard called the album track "Young Generation" one of the best South Korean songs of 2013.

In 2014, Glen Check performed at the South by Southwest music festival as part of a Korean rock showcase. That same year, Melissa Locker of Time singled out Glen Check as her favorite band from South Korea, praising their "edgy '80s energy" and "style that's nearly impossible not to dance to."

In 2017, the band released its first album in four years, the EP The Glen Check Experience. The album was a departure from their synth-pop sound and featured genres including psychedelic rock, old school hip hop, acid jazz, and techno. The album charted at number 38 on South Korea's Gaon Album Chart. Billboard named it as one of the twenty best South Korean albums of the year and described it as "perhaps the most sonically adventurous album on the list." On 3 August 2018, the band released the track "Velvet Goldmine".

They released the single Dive Baby, Dive on 13 September 2021. This was followed by the release of the song "Raving" and the announcement of a new album, Bleach, released on 5 March 2022.

The track "Dazed and Confused" on Bleach was chosen as the theme song for the 2024 Netflix show The Boyfriend, a landmark series that was the first gay-dating show on Japanese television. A second track on the album, "4ever," was used as a leitmotif, or recurring refrain, to highlight key moments in the series, such as when two cast members progressed their relationship or when an individual showed emotional growth.

In 2026, the group released a new single "Bloom" through Netflix Music, in conjunction with Season 2 of The Boyfriend. The track plays a similar role to "4ever", with recurring snippets played throughout the show during moments of dramatic tension, impending choice, or relationship development.

== Artistry ==
Glen Check is notable for only singing in English. While the band have cited Western music as being an influence on them, they were also inspired by African music and traditional Korean music on their album Haute Couture. For Cliché, they looked to funk and disco music from the 1970s and 1980s for their inspiration. The band has said that they do not want their sound to be limited, and that they plan to experiment in many different styles. Glen Check places an emphasis on the visual aspects of their live shows and have been noted for their stage design.

== Band members ==
=== Current members ===
- Kim June-one – lead vocals, guitars (2011–present)
- Zayvo – guitars, synthesizers (2023–present)

=== Former members ===
- Kang Hyuk-jun – bass guitar, synthesizers (2011–2025)
- Ryu Jeon-yeol – drums, percussion (2011–2012)
- Choe Tae-geun – drums, percussion (2011)

== Discography ==
=== Studio albums ===
Title	Album details	Peak chart positions	Sales
Title	Album details	KOR	Sales
Haute Couture	Released: 28 February 2012; Label: Soundholic; Track listing: 1. The Naked Sun; 2. Vogue Boys And Girls; 3. French Virgin Party; 4. The Flashback; 5. Rebellion; 6. Bataille!; 7. Au Revoir; 8. Concorde; 9. 60's Cardin; 10. Racket; 11. Vivid	—	N/A
Youth!	Released: 19 November 2013; Label: Soundholic; Track listing Disc 1: 1. The Match Open; 2. Pacific; 3. Summer Hearts; 4. Youth In Revolt; 5. Paint It Gold; 6. Anthem For The Wild Souls; Disc 2: 1. Young Generation; 2. I've Got This Feeling; 3. Brooklyn; 4. The Coast; 5. Jordan	—	N/A
Bleach	Released: 3 March 2022; Label: EMA Recordings; Track listing: 1. Acid Test; 2. Dazed & Confused; 3. Waves; 4. Dive Baby, Dive; 5. Sins; 6. Sometimes You Gotta Shake It Off; 7. Blush; 8. Bliss; 9. Raving; 10. Long Strange Days Pt.2; 11. Runaway; 12. 4ever 13. I Feel Like Ridin' Slow	—	N/A
"—" denotes releases that did not chart.

=== Extended plays ===
Title	Album details	Peak chart positions	Sales
Title	Album details	KOR	Sales
Disco Elevator	Released: February 11, 2011; Track listing: 1. Disco Elevator; 2. Metro; 3. Dressing Room (Demo); 4. Dressing Room (Acoustic)	—	N/A
Au Revoir	Released: September 29, 2011; Label: Soundholic; Track listing: 1. Au Revoir; 2. 60's Cardin	—	N/A
Cliché	Released: September 28, 2012; Label: Soundholic; Track listing: 1. Blood, Sweat & The Beat; 2. ’84; 3. Leather; 4. Want You Back; 5. ’84 The Original	—	N/A
The Glen Check Experience	Released: August 13, 2017; Label: BANA; Track listing: 1. Dreaming Kills; 2. Follow the White Rabbit; 3. Long Strange Days, Pt. 1; 4. Mayhem; 5. Rude & Confused	38	N/A
"—" denotes releases that did not chart.

=== Remix albums ===
Title	Album details
'84	Released: December 11, 2012; Label: Soundholic; Track listing: 1. '84; 2. '84 (Arno Grieco Remix); 3. '84 (Acid Punk Dynamite); 4. '84 (Surrender! Remix); 5. '84 (Juneoney Remix)
I've Got This Feeling Remixes	Released: March 19, 2014; Label: Soundholic; Track listing: 1. I've Got This Feeling; 2. I've Got This Feeling (Kartell Remix); 3. I've Got This Feeling (Lorenz Rhode Remix); 4. I've Got This Feeling (Tesla55 Remix); 5. I've Got This Feeling (Cabinett Remix)
Pacific Remixes	Released: June 5, 2014; Label: Soundholic; Track listing: 1. Pacific; 2. Pacific (Moullinex Remix); 3. Pacific (Justin Faust Remix); 4. Pacific (Les Loups Remix); 5. Pacific (Glen Check "Summer" Remix)
Paint It Gold Remixes	Released: July 16, 2014; Label: Soundholic; Track listing: 1. Paint It Gold; 2. Paint It Gold (Anoraak Remix); 3. Paint It Gold (Jean Tonique Remix); 4. Paint It Gold (Like Likes Remix); 5. Paint It Gold (Knuckle G Remix)

== Awards ==
=== Korean Music Awards ===
Year	Category	Recipient	Result	Ref
2013	Best Dance & Electronic Album	Haute Couture	Won	
2014	Best Dance & Electronic Album	Youth	Won	
2023	Best Electronic Album	Bleach	Nominated	
2023	Best Electronic Song	4ever	Nominated	
