= Dreamtalk =

Studio album by 3rd Line Butterfly
- Released: 21 September 2012
- Genre: Indie rock, psychedelic rock
- Length: 60:40
- Label: Beatball Records

3rd Line Butterfly chronology
Ice Cube (2012)	Dreamtalk (2012)	Divided by Zero (2017)

Dreamtalk is the fourth studio album by South Korean rock band 3rd Line Butterfly. The album was released on 21 September 2012. The album won the 2013 Korean Music Awards for album of the year, the best modern rock album, and the best modern rock song.

== Background ==
In 2012, 3rd Line Butterfly released EP Ice Cube, and soon after that, there were member changes, with Seo Hyeonjeong joining as a new drummer. They went on a South by Southwest festival and a European tour, and immediately began recording their fourth album after returning to South Korea. The track Jeju Wind 20110807 collected the wind sound of Jeju Island with strong winds on 7 August 2011.

== Critical reception ==
Professional ratings
Review scores
Source	Rating
IZM	4/5 stars

Kim Banya of IZM described the album as "Dreamtalk has just come to a halt in front of us on with old wheel." The selection committee member of the Korean Music Awards Kim Jakka said "Dreamtalk has poetic lyrics that cross sound experimentation, lyricism, and abstraction, which are rarely seen in Korean pop music, to the fullest extent, raising the value of the album", and the album won Album of the Year.

Publication	List	Rank	Ref.
Weiv	The best Korean albums of 2012	N/A	

== Track listing ==
No.	Title	Length
1.	"Smoke Hot Coffee Refill" ("스모우크핫커피리필")	4:30
2.	"Into a Dream" ("꿈속으로")	5:17
3.	"Story Undone" ("넌 어느새 난 또다시")	4:10
4.	"Utterly Sexy" ("니가 더 섹시해 괜찮아")	3:23
5.	"You and Me" ("너와나")	4:09
6.	"Today, the Day of Separation" ("헤어지는 날 바로 오늘")	4:45
7.	"Hello"	4:39
8.	"Incense" ("향")	5:03
9.	"J Says"	4:37
10.	"Nothing There" ("다시 가보니 흔적도 없네")	4:23
11.	"Cucurucucú Paloma" ("쿠쿠루쿠쿠 비둘기")	6:14
12.	"Jeju Wind 20110807" ("제주바람 20110807")	8:03
13.	"Alpha-Bits" ("끝말잇기")	1:27
