= Shin Jeong-ah =

South Korean criminal (born 1972)

- Born: 28 April 1972 (age 54); North Gyeongsang, North Gyeongsang Province
- Education: Jungkyung High School, Seoul
- Known for: fabricating academic records

- Shin Jeong-ah
- Hangul: 신정아
- Hanja: 申貞娥
- RR: Sin Jeonga
- MR: Sin Chŏnga

Shin Jeong-ah (born 28 April 1972) is a South Korean woman who lied about her academic background to become an assistant art professor at Dongguk University and chief curator at Sungkok Art Museum. She created an international scandal shortly after her appointment in July 2007 as joint artistic director of the 2008 Gwangju Biennale, when she was found to have fabricated her academic credentials that she had graduated from the University of Kansas and Yale University. Shin was sentenced to 18 months in prison, and Dongguk University unsuccessfully sued Yale University in U.S. court for at least $50 million in damages.

== Early life ==
Shin claimed that at age 23 in 1995, she was rescued after being trapped for eight hours under the rubble of the Sampoong Department Store collapse.

== Educational background ==
While applying to Dongguk University and the 2008 Gwangju Biennale, Shin said she earned BFA (1994) and MBA (1995) degrees at the University of Kansas, and a Ph.D. from Yale University in April 2005. Shin submitted to Dongguk what she called her dissertation, "Guillaume Apollinaire: Catalyst for primitivism, for Picabia and Duchamp," which was later found to have been submitted to the University of Virginia in 1981 by Greek scholar Ekaterini Samaltanou-Tsiakma. Shin's highest level of completed education was found to be high school.

== Timeline of scandal ==
=== 2005 ===
- 1 September 2005 – Dongguk University, a Buddhist-affiliated university, hires Shin as an assistant professor with the strong backing of Hong Ki-sam, then-president of Dongguk. Questions arise as to her credentials after the art department rejects hiring her because of her lack of academic background saying that she studied Western art history and not Buddhist art history, the department's focus.
- 5 September 2005 – A Dongguk University administrator sends a registered letter to Yale University Graduate School Associate Dean Pamela Schirmeister, requesting that she verify the authenticity of a letter that Shin had presented to Dongguk as a certification of her degree during the hiring process.
- 22 September 2005 – Schirmeister confirms via fax that Shin received her doctorate from Yale, stating that "I am confirming that the attached letter was issued by the Yale Graduate School and signed by me."

=== 2007 ===
- April 2007 – The Korea College Art Association reports that Shin's diploma is a forgery after receiving a letter from Professor Christine Mehring of Yale University saying that Shin was never one of her students and that she had never read any papers written under her name.
- 11 June 2007 – Yale University informs Dongguk University that Shin did not receive a doctorate from them, stating that the degree confirmation fax letter sent in 2005 by Schirmeister is "not authentic" and a forgery. Yale also tells Korean media that it had not received a registered letter in 2005 asking whether Shin had received a doctorate from Yale.
- 4 July 2007 – Shin is appointed as artistic co-director of the 2008 Gwangju Biennale, Korea’s biggest arts event.
- 11 July 2007 – Lee Sang-il, Dongguk University’s dean of academic affairs, holds a press conference on campus, stating that "Yale University notified us that Shin has never registered with the school, let alone received a doctoral degree."
  - The University of Kansas tells Yonhap News Agency that although Shin attended the school from 1992 to 1996, she did not graduate.
- 12 July 2007 – Gwangju Biennale foundation revokes its decision to appoint Shin as co-director of its 2008 event.
- 16 July 2007 – Shin flies to New York and begins her stay in the U.S. saying she would go to Yale to collect evidence that can prove her claims.
- 20 July 2007 – Dongguk University fires Shin for fabricating her academic records including a bachelor's degree from the University of Kansas and a doctorate from Yale University.
  - Dongguk University also files complaints to the prosecution for further investigation on others involved in the scandal.
- August 2007 – Dongguk University sends Yale University an e-mail saying it had located the U.S. Postal Service tracking record showing that its 2005 registered letter was signed for by a Yale staff member.
- 11 October 2007 – Shin and Byeon Yang-kyoon are imprisoned.
- 29 December 2007 – Yale University officials issue a statement both expressing their regrets and admitting to the error.

=== 2009 ===
- April 2009 – Shin is released from prison after serving for 18 months.

=== Lawsuits ===
On 27 March 2008, Dongguk University sued Yale University for at least $50 million, claiming Yale's actions had "severely tarnished" Dongguk University's reputation, sparked a criminal probe, cost employees their jobs, and led to a decline in donations, government grants and student applications. Yale called the error an administrative mistake and stated that the lawsuit was without merit.

Yale also noted that Dongguk failed to take action after the Korea College Art Association reported she had not received her doctorate from Yale. Dongguk fired Shin on July 20, 2007, "long after Shin's lies unraveled," court papers said. Yale also responded by saying that in addition to Dongguk's delayed reaction to the notice and own involvement in the scandal, "we think the jury will certainly consider the fact that the chairman of Dongguk's board was convicted of soliciting and receiving an illegal government subsidy from Ms. Shin's lover, who was an adviser to the Korean president." The suit was eventually dismissed in 2012.

A South Korean court handed down a suspended one-year jail term to former presidential aide Byeon Yang-kyoon, with whom Shin was romantically linked. Shin and Byeon made headlines in 2007 after Byeon used his influence to get Shin hired by Dongguk University. He was forced to step down as an aide to then-President Roh Moo-hyun because of the scandal. Byeon was ordered to conduct 160 hours of community service for exercising his influence to provide state tax benefits to a Buddhist temple founded by a former Dongguk University official who helped hire Shin as a professor.

In the course of reporting on Shin's troubles, daily newspaper Munhwa Ilbo printed nude photos of Shin on 13 September 2007, claiming that they were evidence of her inappropriate relationship with Byeon Yang-kyoon. However, the KPEC rejected Munhwa Ilbo's explanation, and ordered the daily to apologise, stating that it had damaged the dignity of all print media. Shin's lawyer stated that she planned to sue the newspaper for libel. Munhwa Ilbo published the apology on the front page of their 18 October 2007 edition; however, the apology itself attracted criticism from the Korea Sexual Violence Relief Center, and the KPEC indicated that they would review the matter again to decide whether the newspaper's statement actually constituted a proper apology. In the end, Shin filed suit over the photos and the newspaper's coverage of her, receiving W150 million (US$113,000) in compensation in December 2008.

== In popular culture ==
Miss Ripley is a 16-episode MBC Television series that is loosely based on Shin Jeong-ah's story.
