= Loro's =

South Korean post-rock band

- Origin: Seoul, South Korea
- Genres: Post-rock
- Years active: 2005-present (on hiatus from 2015)
- Labels: Oreum Entertainment
- Members: Do Jaemyeong; Choi Jongmin; Jane; Bok Namgyu; Kim Seok
- Past members: Jinsil

Loro's (Korean: 로로스) is a South Korean rock band. The band currently consists of Do Jaemyeong, Choi Jongmin, Jane, Kim Seok and Bok Namgyu. Since their formation in 2005, the band has released 2 studio albums: Pax (2008) and W.A.N.D.Y (2014). They won Rookie of the Year in 2009 and Album of the Year in 2015 at the Korean Music Awards. They are currently on hiatus from 2015.

== Career ==
Loro's was formed in Hongdae in 2005 by Do Jaemyeong, Choi Jongmin, Jane, Bok Namgyu, Kim Seok and Jinsil. Do Jaemyeong was a former member of shoegaze band Zzzaam. They released their first single Scent Of Orchid in 2006. In 2007, they were named Hello Rookie in The EBS space.

In 2008, they released their first studio album Pax. They won the Rookie of the Year at the 2009 Korean Music Awards. In 2009, they released an EP Dream(s), and Na Wonyoung of Weiv described the ep as "Dream(s) is a machine-like song where everything works perfectly in perfect composition, including performance, emotion, composition, narrative, texture, space, everything".

In 2014, they released their second studio album, W.A.N.D.Y. With the album, they won the 2015 Korean Music Awards for Album of the Year and The Best Modern Rock Album. They were invited to the Midem, a music fair in Cannes. In March 2015 they released the single "Time". The member Jinsil left the band to focus on his new band Life and Time.

In July 2015, they announced that they would be on hiatus. Do Jaemyeong said the reason was the members' withdrawal, and his willingness to keep the band disappeared because of that. In a 2017 interview, he interviewed that the band had not broken up, but was preparing again to be with the new members. Do Jaemyeong released his solo debut studio album Under the Sign of Saturn (토성의 영향 아래) in 2017.

== Discography ==
=== Albums ===
- Pax (2008)
- W.A.N.D.Y (2014)

=== Extended plays ===
- Dream(s) (2009)
