= Zzzaam =

South Korean shoegaze band

zzzaam
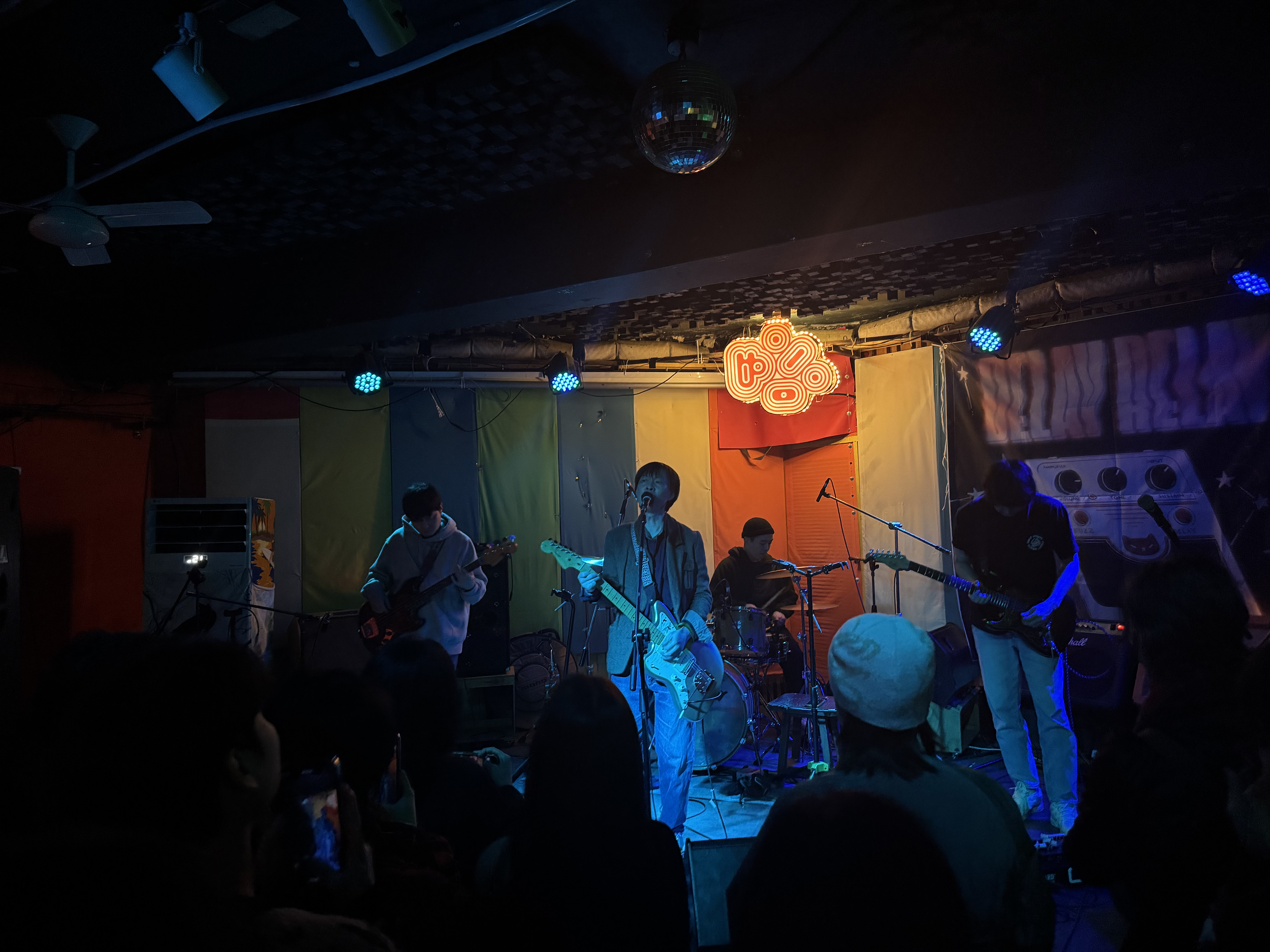
- Zzzaam in 2025

Background information
- Origin: Seoul, South Korea
- Genres: Shoegaze; dream pop
- Years active: 1997–present
- Labels: Cavare (Past); Poclanos (Distributor); Independent
- Members: Park Seongwoo; Do Jaemyeong; Jang Daewon; Park Seungjoon
- Past members: Lee Minsoo; Lee Wooram; Kim Namyoon; Lee Nana; Choi Sohee

zzzaam (Korean: 잠) is a South Korean shoegaze band. The band consists of Park Seongwoo, Do Jaemyeong, Jang Daewon and Park Seungjoon as of 2026. Since their formation in 1997, the band has released 4 albums: Siesta (낮잠) (2000), Requiem #1 (2002) and Mirror Play (거울놀이) (2004), and shine (2024).

== History ==
Zzzaam was formed in 1997 at the live club Drug, and the band name is a combination of "zzz" and "잠" ("sleep" in Korean). In 2000, they released their first studio album Siesta (낮잠). They gained popularity with indie fans in the late 1990s and mid-2000s, mainly at the Hongdae club scene along with Crying Nut, No Brain, Lazy Bone and Weeper.

They released their second album Requiem #1 in 2002. Both the first and second albums were produced with only a small quantity of physical albums, but they continued their career by forming a fanatic base. In 2004, they released their third studio album Mirror play (거울놀이). The band was dormant since the 2004 album, during which time the former bassist Choi Sohee pursued a solo musician career under the stage name Sorri (소히), and Do Jaemyeong was active as a member in the band Loro's.

In 2023, zzzaam announced the resumption of band activities, with their first and second albums remastered and released online. The remastered version of the album was well received, with John Wohlmacher of Beats Per Minute described the album Siesta as "A mysterious and intriguing listen, Siesta sounds like no other shoegaze album, yet is clearly ingrained in the core dynamics of its aesthetics and should be on every aficionado's radar." They released new singles Sleeptalking not sleeptalking (잠꼬대 아닌 잠꼬대) and The Moment of Breakup (Yeah Yeah) (헤어짐의 순간 (예예)). Kim Byungwoo of Music Y reviewed "There is enough continuity of the band, and it is an impeccable comeback in terms of introducing a new band."

Following the release of their fourth album Shine(빛나) in 2024, the band has remained actively engaged in the music scene. In 2026, they released the single "Maria" through Poclanos as a pre-release ahead of their upcoming 5th album. They described the song as "a resonant cry of salvation toward a noble, sublime, sacred and dignified soul".

== Discography ==
=== Albums ===
- Siesta (낮잠) (2000)
- Requiem #1 (2002)
- Mirror Play (거울놀이) (2004)
- shine (빛나) (2024)
