= Flood Format =

Studio album by Bird's Eye Batang
- Released: 22 May 2022
- Genre: Electronic music
- Length: 33:19
- Label: The Vault
- Producer: Mid-Air Thief

Bird's Eye Batang chronology
Crumbling (2018)	Flood Format (2022)

Flood Format (Korean: 손을 모아; RR: Soneul Moa; lit. Hand in Hand) is the third studio album by South Korean musician Mid-Air Thief, released under the moniker Bird's Eye Batang (Korean: 새눈바탕; RR: Saenunbatang). The album was released on 22 May 2022.

== Critical reception ==
Music critic Seojeongmingab reviewed "Flood Format is the album that is not wrong even if it "breaks from all notions that formal laws of beauty exist." Jang Joonhwan of IZM said "Warm films of Mid-Air Thief, finely released by cooling and opening and closing." Manneung Chobo of Tonplein described the album's track Spin & Stone (돌고 돌) as "the song that deviates from the artist's existing method that presupposes irregularities."

== Track listing ==
No.	Title	Length
1.	"Slippery Smile" ("미손 미끌")	4:02
2.	"Tongue Tracers" ("혓것")	3:53
3.	"Spin & Stone" ("돌고 돌")	5:45
4.	"Ripplippling" ("빙의빙")	2:21
5.	"Towards" ("윙윙")	1:08
6.	"Brux Batang" ("브럭스 바탕")	5:07
7.	"The Wider the Wheel" ("산신")	7:19
8.	"Are Your Wings Swept?" ("수")	3:44
