= Suzanne (album) =

2015 album by Kim Sa-wol

Studio album by Kim Sa-wol
- Released: October 27, 2015
- Genre: Folk
- Length: 39:13
- Label: Mirrorball Records
- Producer: Kim Hae-won

Kim Sa-wol chronology
Suzanne (2015)	Romance (2018)

Suzanne (Korean: 수잔) is the debut studio album by South Korean singer-songwriter Kim Sa-wol. The album was released on 27 October 2015. The album won the Best Folk Album at the 2016 Korean Music Awards.

== Background ==
Kim Sa-wol released the album Secret with Kim Hae-won in 2014, and her first solo studio album was also produced by him. She once described the album as "a record of the days when she lived as a woman in her 20s in Seoul."

== Critical reception ==
Professional ratings
Review scores
Source	Rating
IZM	3.5/5 stars

Kim Seonghwan of Music Y reviewed "Kim Sa-wol embodies her experiences and thoughts as stories that are independent and have a consistent flow one by one through a speaker collectively referred to as Suzanne. Kim Hae-won's arrangement direction also leads listeners to focus on the charm of her vocals, which capture both pure and tender sensibility and secret sensual energy." Lee Seonyeob of Weiv described the album as "It's a collection of essays written by a persona, Suzanne full of Kim Sa-wol's voice using the sound of an acoustic guitar as a letter paper,"

Publication	List	Rank	Ref.
Music Y	Album of the Year of 2015	9	
Weiv	The best Korean albums of 2015	7	

== Track listing ==
No.	Title	Length
1.	"Suzanne" ("수잔")	2:55
2.	"Beautiful" ("아름다워")	3:59
3.	"Exhale" ("콧바람")	3:23
4.	"Signal" ("접속")	4:24
5.	"Map of Dreams" ("꿈꿀 수 있다면 어디라도")	3:33
6.	"Something in the Air" ("향기")	3:41
7.	"Young Girls" ("젊은 여자")	2:34
8.	"Freak" ("악취")	4:59
9.	"Bird" ("새")	3:28
10.	"John" ("존")	3:15
11.	"Bedside" ("머리맡")	3:02
