= The Monotones (South Korean band) =

South Korean rock band

- Origin: Seoul, South Korea
- Genres: Indie rock; punk rock
- Years active: 2012-2018
- Labels: Pandawhale
- Past members: Cha Seung-woo; Hoon Jo; Ha Seonhyeong; Choi Wookno; Park Hyeonjoon; Kim Seyoung

The Monotones (Korean: 더 모노톤즈) is a South Korean rock band. The band formed in 2012 and disbanded in 2018. The band was formed by Cha Seung-woo, who was a member of No Brain and The Moonshiners, and Park Hyeonjoon, who was a member of Pipi Band. Their only studio album Into the Night (2015) won the Best Rock Album at the 2016 Korean Music Awards.

== Career ==
The Monotones was formed in late 2012, and was first formed by Cha Seung-woo from No Brain, and Park Hyun-joon from Pippi Band. The band's formation came shortly after the breakup of Cha's previous band, The Moonshiners. Vocalist Kim Seyoung and drummer Choi Wookno have joined as new members later, but Kim Seyoung leaves the band due to health problems after first five performances. The Monotones posted a recruitment announcement to find new vocalists, and Hoon Jo sent them demo tapes to apply it. He then joined the band as a new vocalist.

Park Hyeonjoon left the band while recording their first studio album, and Ha Seonhyeong joined as a new member. In 2015, they released their first studio album Into the Night. Lee Sooho of IZM described the album as "It's an album that brought together great dalants and produced excellent Garage punk opus." Into the Night was nominated for Album of the Year and Best Rock Album at the 2016 Korean Music Awards, and won Best Rock Album.

In 2016, they released the single End of the Summer (여름의 끝). They supported the concert of Liam Gallagher and Foo Fighters in 2017.

They were about to release their documentary film Into the Night in 2018, but members Choi Wookno and Ha Seonhyeong were involved in sex scandal rumours, and the band announced their disbandment with the suspension of the release of a film. After the band broke up, Cha Seung-woo became a solo musician under the stage name Cha Cha, and Hoon Jo has been active since forming his new band, Atom Music Heart.

== Discography ==
=== Albums ===
- Into the Night (2015)

=== Singles ===
- "End of the Summer" (여름의 끝; 2016)
