= Mickey 17 (soundtrack) =

Mickey 17 (Original Motion Picture Soundtrack)

Film score by Jung Jae-il
- Released: February 28, 2025
- Recorded: 2022–2025
- Studios: Abbey Road Studios, London; Teldex Studio, Berlin; Rottenbiller Studio, Budapest
- Genre: Film score
- Length: 39:57
- Label: WaterTower Music
- Producer: Jung Jae-il

Jung Jae-il chronology
| Squid Game (season 2) (2024) | Mickey 17 (Original Motion Picture Soundtrack) (2025) | Squid Game (season 3) (2025) |

Mickey 17 (Original Motion Picture Soundtrack) is the film score composed by Jung Jae-il to the 2025 science fiction black comedy film Mickey 17 directed by Bong Joon Ho, starring Robert Pattinson, Naomi Ackie, Steven Yeun, Toni Collette and Mark Ruffalo. Mickey 17's score is composed by Jung Jae-il which was released through WaterTower Music on February 28, 2025.

== Background ==
Jung Jae-il was announced as the film's composer, by Warner Bros., having previously composed Joon-ho's Okja (2017) and Parasite (2019). Jae-il considered Mickey 17 as the closest to his personal music taste among other film scores he composed, describing it as "classical and intimate". The score was under production for three years and was recorded at the Abbey Road Studios, London, Teldex Studio, Berlin and the Rottenbiller Studio, Budapest. It was released through WaterTower Music on February 28, 2025, a week prior to the film's release. A vinyl edition of the album was scheduled for release in May 2025.

== Critical reception ==
Jonathan Broxton of Movie Music UK wrote "Jae-Il Jung's score is full of idiosyncratic choices that an established Hollywood composer would likely never make, and the fact that director Joon-Ho Bong encouraged this approach is commendable; [...] this is what makes Mickey 17 the success that it is. The surprising instrumental palette, the unexpected tonal shifts, and the general quirkiness of its overall sound, combines with some genuinely beautiful romantic writing and some excellent action material, resulting in a score which – like the film that it accompanies – swings for the fences, and is perhaps a little overly-ambitious, but nevertheless works in spite of itself." Filmtracks wrote "the 49-minute album drags considerably but is never unpleasant, making for an easy but forgettable listening experience outside of the terrible and sickening religious source song for the villains in "Rejoice in the Lord" at the presentation's end. Like the film itself, there was too much potential for a really fantastic parody here that was left unexplored, despite the impressive action at the climax."

Anton Smit of Soundtrack World called it as a "terrific score" and praised Jae-il's ability to translate the "dark comedic elements into the score very well". Ben of Soundtrack Universe wrote "With its largely tonal soundscape and heavy influence from various Classical pieces, Mickey 17 is a rather wonderful score that showcases both Jung's talents at the keyboard as well as his musical wit. While those wishing to hear Jung's more contemporary or atmospheric writing from Squid Games might be disappointed, that shouldn't stop one from exploring this decadently subversive Neo-Classical score of surprising beauty."

Joshua Abraham of The Battalion wrote "The film's score also deserves a shout-out. Jung Jae-il, who composed "Parasite," "Okja" and "Squid Games," has such a recognizable tone in his composition that works effectively across these productions. The quiet parts are soft and contemplative, but the extravagant sequences are loud and chaotic, working in tandem with the themes that Bong wants to emphasize." David Rooney of The Hollywood Reporter and Jacob Aller of The A.V. Club called it "parodic", while Tim Grierson of Screen International called it a "quirky score".

== Track listing ==
| No. | Title | Length |
|---|---|---|
| 1. | "Bon Appetit" | 2:31 |
| 2. | "Immigrant" | 2:42 |
| 3. | "Frog" | 1:39 |
| 4. | "Nasha" | 5:26 |
| 5. | "Vaccine" | 1:38 |
| 6. | "Multiple" | 2:30 |
| 7. | "Barnes" | 2:12 |
| 8. | "Calm Before the Storm" | 0:44 |
| 9. | "Umma" | 2:58 |
| 10. | "Ulsang" | 1:07 |
| 11. | "Attention" | 1:57 |
| 12. | "Arrival" | 1:58 |
| 13. | "Nasha Is Amazing I" | 1:01 |
| 14. | "Bon Appetit with Strings" | 1:08 |
| 15. | "Mayhem" | 3:47 |
| 16. | "Corridor of Love" | 3:14 |
| 17. | "Why Kill Luco?" | 1:41 |
| 18. | "Set Off" | 3:00 |
| 19. | "Chaos" | 3:55 |
| 20. | "Nasha Is Amazing II" | 3:17 |
| 21. | "Rejoice in the Lord" (Mark Ruffalo, Toni Collette, Daniel Henshall and Anamaria Vartolomei) | 1:00 |
| Total length: | | 49:25 |

== Personnel ==
- Music composer and producer: Jung Jae-il
- Score recorded by: Lewis Jones, René Möller, Dénes Rédly
- Score recorded at: Abbey Road Studios, London; Teldex Studio, Berlin; Rottenbiller Studio, Budapest
- Score mixed by: Byungkeuk Kim
- Score mixed at: Abbey Road Studios, London
- Pro-tools operator: George Oulton, Marta Di Nozzi, Yejee Lee, Lukas Kohn
- Score coordinator: Lim Yeon Jung
- Score orchestrated and conducted by: James Brett
- Additional orchestrator: Balint Sapszon
- Music preparation by: Dave Hage, Yejee Lee
- Orchestra: London Symphony Orchestra
- Orchestra leader: Andrej Power
- Choir: The London Voices
- Music clearance: Jackie Joseph

== Release history ==
Release history and formats for Mickey 17 (Original Motion Picture Soundtrack)
| Region | Date | Format(s) | Label(s) | Ref. |
|---|---|---|---|---|
| Various | February 28, 2025 | Digital download; streaming | WaterTower Music | |
| Various | May 30, 2025 | LP | Waxwork Records | |
