= Into the Night (The Monotones album) =

Studio album by The Monotones
- Released: November 19, 2015
- Genre: Punk rock
- Length: 54:41
- Label: Mirrorball Records

Into the Night is the first and only studio album by South Korean punk rock band, The Monotones, released on November 19, 2015. The album won the Best Rock Album at the 2016 Korean Music Awards.

== Background ==
The Monotones began working on the album after announcing the recruitment of a new vocalist following the sudden departure of Kim Seyoung. A year later, Hoon Jo joined as the new vocalist and the band began recording their debut album. During the recording process, Park Hyeonjoon left the band, leading the band to describe the period as a "Recording of hell."

== Critical reception ==
Professional ratings
Review scores
Source	Rating
IZM	4/5 stars

Lee Sooho of IZM described the album as "It's an album that brought together great talents and produced excellent Garage punk opus." The member of the selection committee for the Korean Music Awards Lee Kyeongjoon reviewed "Into the Night is a clever record that explores the past with agility but never misses modernity."

== Track listing ==
No.	Title	Length
1.	"Blow Up"	3:18
2.	"A"	4:23
3.	"The Beat Goes On"	4:02
4.	"Popo"	4:59
5.	"Into the Night"	5:10
6.	"Brown Eyed Girl"	4:33
7.	"Watchman"	4:28
8.	"Winter Song"	2:28
9.	"Mr.K" ("K군의 어느 하루")	4:07
10.	"Baby You're So Cold"	3:00
11.	"Glorious Day"	4:44
12.	"Rita"	4:44
13.	"Zero"	4:45
