= 3rd Line Butterfly =

South Korean indie rock band

- Origin: Seoul, South Korea
- Genres: Indie rock; alternative rock; psychedelic rock
- Years active: 1999-present (on hiatus from 2019)
- Label: Oreum Entertainment
- Members: Nam Sangah; Kim Namyoon; Seo Hyeonjeong
- Past members: Seong Kiwan; Park Hyeonjoon; Kim Kyuhyeong; Choi Changwoo; Kim Sangwoo

3rd Line Butterfly (Korean: 3호선 버터플라이) is a South Korean rock band. The band currently consists of Nam Sang Ah, Kim Namyoon and Seo Hyeonjeong. Since their formation in 1999, the band has released 5 studio albums: Self-Titled Obsession (2000), Oh! Silence (2002), Time Table (2004), Dreamtalk (2012) and Divided by Zero (2017). Their album Dreamtalk won Album of the Year at the 2013 Korean Music Awards. They temporarily went on hiatus after their concert in February 2019. 3rd Line Butterfly have since released their first new record in eight years, Hwanhee Ultraviolet, in August 2025.

== Career ==
3rd Line Butterfly was formed in 1999 by Seong Kiwan, Nam Sangah, Kim Sangwoo and Park Hyeonjoon. Nam Sangah and Kim Sangwoo were ex-members of the band Huckleberry Finn. They released their first studio album Self-Titled Obsession in 2000, and participated in the 2002 drama Ruler of Your Own World on the soundtrack. In 2002, they released their second album Oh! Silence. They released their third album Time Table in 2004, and had a break before 2009.

During the long break, the band members had hard time to make music, and member Kim Namyoon said to the band members, "2009 is the band's 10th anniversary, so if we can't release an album again, let's break up. If we can't do this, we can't do it forever." And they released an EP Nine Days or a Million in 2009. The track Deep Night, in the Fog (깊은 밤, 안개 속) was nominated for Song of the Year at the Korean Music Awards. In 2012, they released their fourth studio album Dreamtalk, and they won Best Modern Rock Album, Best Modern Rock Song, and Album of the Year at the 2013 Korean Music Awards. They performed at the 2012 South by Southwest festival, and they had a European tour in 2014.

In 2017, they released their fifth album Divided By Zero. Music Y named the album fourth place in album of the year, describing it as "They play a very clever role in enhancing the quality of the album itself". Founding member Seong Kiwan left the band straight after the album was released, and formed his own other band, AASSA. In 2018, they performed at the K-Music Showcase hosted by the Korea Creative Content Agency, Korean Cultural Centre UK and Rich Mix in London.

3rd Line Butterfly announced that they would be on hiatus of after their final concert in February 2019 After the concert, vocalist Nam Sangah immigrated to France, her husband's hometown. Drummer Seo Hyeonjeong said in an interview that the announcement was not a break up of the band.

In 2025, 3rd Line Butterfly announced their resumption of activities with the release of a new single that July. This was followed by their release of the Hwanhee Ultraviolet EP and an appearance at the Pentaport Rock Festival in August.

== Discography ==
=== Albums ===
- Self-Titled Obsession (2000)
- Oh! Silence (2002)
- Time Table (2004)
- Dreamtalk (2012)
- Divided by Zero (2017)
- Hwanhee Ultraviolet (2025)

=== Extended plays ===
- Nine Days or a Million (2009)
- Ice Cube (2012)
