= Kim Sa-wol =

South Korean singer-songwriter

- Origin: South Korea
- Genre: Folk
- Occupation: Singer-songwriter
- Years active: 2014–present

Korean name
- Hangul: 김사월
- RR: Gim Sawol
- MR: Kim Sawŏl

Kim Sa-wol (Korean: 김사월) is a South Korean singer-songwriter. She debuted in 2014 with the extended play Secret, a collaboration with singer Kim Hae-won. The duo won Best New Artist and Best Folk Album the following year at the 2015 Korean Music Awards. She has since released the full-length albums Suzanne (2015), Romance (2018) and Heaven (2020).

== Discography ==
=== Studio albums ===
Title	Album details	Peak chart positions	Sales
Title	Album details	KOR	Sales
Suzanne (수잔)	Released: October 27, 2015; Label: Poclanos; Format: CD, digital download	35	KOR: 2,020
Romance (로맨스)	Released: September 16, 2018; Label: Poclanos; Format: CD, digital download	49	KOR: 1,300
Heaven (헤븐)	Released: September 14, 2020; Label: YG Plus; Format: CD, digital download	69	KOR: 1,100
Default	Released: March 19, 2024; Label: Poclanos; Format: CD, digital download	—	
"—" denotes releases that did not chart or were not released in that region.

=== Extended plays ===
Title	Album details	Peak chart positions	Sales
Title	Album details	KOR	Sales
Secret (비밀) Collaboration with Kim Hae-won	Released: October 10, 2014; Label: Poclanos; Format: CD, digital download	—	
Drive (드라이브)	Released: September 24, 2021; Label: Poclanos; Format: CD, digital download	85	
"—" denotes releases that did not chart or were not released in that region.

== Awards and nominations ==
Year	Award	Category	Nominated work	Result	Ref.
2015	Korean Music Awards	Best New Artist	Kim Sa-wol (with Kim Hae-won)	Won	
2015	Korean Music Awards	Best Folk Album	Secret (with Kim Hae-won)	Won	
2015	Korean Music Awards	Album of the Year	Secret (with Kim Hae-won)	Nominated	
2015	Korean Music Awards	Song of the Year	"Secret"	Nominated	
2015	Korean Music Awards	Best Folk Song	"Secret"	Nominated	
2016	Korean Music Awards	Best Folk Album	Suzanne	Won	
2016	Korean Music Awards	Album of the Year	Suzanne	Nominated	
2016	Korean Music Awards	Song of the Year	"Bedside" (머리맡)	Nominated	
2016	Korean Music Awards	Best Folk Song	"Bedside" (머리맡)	Nominated	
2019	Korean Music Awards	Best Folk Album	Romance	Won	
2019	Korean Music Awards	Best Folk Song	"Someone"	Won	
2019	Korean Music Awards	Musician of the Year	Kim Sa-wol	Nominated	
2021	Korean Music Awards	Best Folk Album	Heaven	Nominated	
2021	Korean Music Awards	Best Folk Song	"Key"	Nominated	
