= Jung Jae-il =

South Korean composer and musician (born 1982)

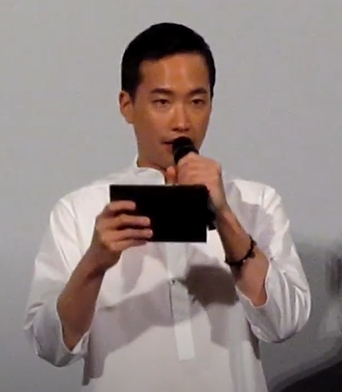
- Jung in 2017
- Born: May 7, 1982 (age 44); Seoul, South Korea
- Education: Seoul Jazz Academy
- Occupations: Composer; musician
- Years active: 1997–present
- Musical career
- Genres: New-age; contemporary jazz; ballad; folk
- Instruments: Piano; guitar; bass guitar
- Formerly of: Giggs; Puri

Korean name
- Hangul: 정재일
- Hanja: 鄭在日
- RR: Jeong Jaeil
- MR: Chŏng Chaeil

Jung Jae-il (Korean: 정재일,Korean pronunciation: [tɕʌŋ tɕɛ il]; born May 7, 1982) is a South Korean composer known for writing the scores of the 2019 Academy Award-winning film Parasite and Netflix's Squid Game, which earned him a nomination for Outstanding Original Main Title Theme Music at the 74th Primetime Creative Arts Emmy Awards.

== Biography ==
Jung Jae-il was three years old when he first played piano, and he picked up the guitar at nine. When he was 13, he posted an ad in the magazine Hot Music, "to find bass drums and vocals to do a style of music that is similar to the British heavy metal band Carcass". Jung graduated from Seoul Jazz Academy.

In 1999, he joined the band Gigs (which Jung Won-yong, vocalist Lee Juck, and guitarist Han Sang-won were also part of) on bass guitar. He released his first solo album, Tear Flower (눈물꽃), in 2003. In 2007, he played with the band Puri on their second album.

Jung performed on the piano during the April 2018 inter-Korean summit.

In 2021, he won the Hollywood Music in Media Awards for Best Score in a TV Show for Squid Game.

== Partial discography ==
=== Studio albums ===
- Tear Flower (눈물꽃) (2003)

=== Film ===
Year	Title	Director	Studio
1997	Bad Movie	Jang Sun-woo	Miracin Korea Film Company
2001	Flower Island	Song Il-gon	C&Film Production
2002	Resurrection of the Little Match Girl	Jang Sun-woo	Kihwik Cine
2003	Wonderful Days	Kim Moon-saeng	Palisades Tartan
2004	Temptation of Wolves	Kim Tae-kyun	Showbox
2007	Venus and Mars	Han Ji seung	Cinema Service
2009	Marine Boy	Yoon Jong-seok	CJ Entertainment
2009	Baram (Wish)	Lee sung han	Sidus F&H
2014	Sea Fog	Shim Sung-bo	Next Entertainment World
2017	Okja	Bong Joon-ho	Netflix (international), Next Entertainment World (South Korea)
2019	Parasite	Bong Joon-ho	Barunson E&A
2022	Broker	Hirokazu Kore-eda	CJ Entertainment
2025	Twinless	James Sweeney	Republic Pictures
2025	Mickey 17	Bong Joon-ho	Warner Bros. Pictures
2026	Possible Love	Lee Chang-dong	Netflix

=== Television ===
Year	Title	Director	Original network
2021–2025	Squid Game	Hwang Dong-hyuk	Netflix
2026	Ponies	Susanna Fogel	Peacock

=== Video games ===
Year	Title	Developer	Publisher	Notes	Ref(s)
TBA	Woochi the Wayfarer	LoreVault	Nexon Games		

== Awards and nominations ==
Award	Year	Category	Nominated work/nominee	Result	Ref.
Baeksang Arts Awards	2022	Technical Award (Music)	Squid Game	Won	
Blue Dragon Film Awards	2026	Best Music	Possible Love	Pending	
Buil Film Awards	2019	Best Score	Parasite	Won	
Grand Bell Awards	2020	Best Original Music Score	Parasite	Won	
Hollywood Music in Media Awards	2019	Best Original Score – Feature Film	Parasite	Nominated	
Hollywood Music in Media Awards	2021	Best Original Score for a TV Show or Limited Series	Squid Game	Won	
Hollywood Music in Media Awards	2021	Best Main Title Theme for a TV Show (Foreign Language)	Squid Game	Nominated	
Korean Music Awards	2004	Best New Artist	Jung Jae-il	Won	
Korean Music Awards	2004	Song of the Year	"Tear Flower"	Nominated	
Korean Music Awards	2010	Best Jazz & Crossover Performance	The Methodologies (with Kim Chaek)	Won	
Korean Music Awards	2010	Best Jazz Album	The Methodologies (with Kim Chaek)	Nominated	
Korean Music Awards	2015	Best Crossover Album	bari, abandoned (with Han Seung-seok)	Won	
Korean Music Awards	2018	Best Crossover Album	And There, the Sea at Last (with Han Seung-seok)	Won	
Primetime Creative Arts Emmy Awards	2022	Outstanding Original Main Title Theme Music	Squid Game	Nominated	
Chanel Next Prize	2021	Winners of the Chanel Next Prize	Jung Jae-il	Won	
