= Just Pop =

Studio album by My Aunt Mary
- Released: July 22, 2004
- Studio: Fluxus Studio
- Genre: Pop rock, jangle pop
- Length: 47:30
- Label: Seoul Record
- Producer: My Aunt Mary

My Aunt Mary chronology
2002 Rock n' Roll Star (2001)	Just Pop (2004)	Drift (2006)

Just Pop is the third studio album by South Korean pop rock band My Aunt Mary. The album was released on 22 July 2004. The album won the 2005 Korean Music Awards for Album of the Year and Best Modern Rock Album.

== Background ==
The album was recorded at Fluxus Studio. The first track of this album Road to the Airport (공항 가는 길) is a song for Lee Jeyoon, who left the band to study abroad after the release of their second album 2002 Rock n' Roll Star. The band interviewed "The word we've been using since we released our first album in 1999 was Just Pop. We do not insist on the legitimacy of rock. It means that we will make a song that will be our favourite song, regardless of the genre's format." about the album's name.

== Critical reception ==
Professional ratings
Review scores
Source	Rating
IZM	4/5 stars
Music Y	4.5/5 stars
Weiv	7/10

Kim Byeongwoo of Music Y described the album as "The 'space' that achieved Just Pop is worth remembering for a long time. The charm of this album comes from its wide space." Weiv reviewed "My Aunt Mary's third album Just Pop gives the impression that they have set their course properly." The member of the selection committee for the Korean Music Awards Lee Dongyeon said "Just Pop is a masterpiece that broadens the common denominator between mainstream and non-mainstream and at the same time informs the unnecessary boundary, which fits well with the purpose of the Korean Music Awards."

== Track listing ==
No.	Title	Length
1.	"Road to the Airport" ("공항 가는 길")	4:00
2.	"Memories of Memory" ("기억의 기억")	4:24
3.	"Golden Glove" ("골든 글러브")	3:22
4.	"Dead Ball" ("데드볼")	1:06
5.	"Childhood Friend" ("소꿉친구")	3:57
6.	"Circle" ("원")	4:06
7.	"Wave Surfing" ("파도타기")	4:02
8.	"4.20" ("4시 20분")	5:28
9.	"Lucky Day" ("럭키 데이")	3:35
10.	"It's Raining" ("비가 내려")	3:57
11.	"Weariness" ("싫증")	4:41
12.	"Fairy Tale"	4:53
