= Crumbling (album) =

Studio album by Mid-Air Thief
- Released: July 31, 2018
- Genre: Folktronica
- Length: 44:04
- Language: Korean; English
- Label: Self-released
- Producer: Mid-Air Thief

Mid-Air Thief chronology
Gongjoong Doduk (2015)	Crumbling (2018)	Flood Format (2022)

Crumbling (Korean: 무너지기; RR: Muneojigi) is the second studio album by South Korean folktronica artist Mid-Air Thief. The album features vocals by South Korean indie singer-songwriter Summer Soul. It was released on July 31, 2018. It was nominated at the Korean Music Awards in 2019 in the categories "Album of the Year" and "Best Dance & Electronic Album" and won the latter.

== Background ==
The album gained attention from online music communities such as Album of The Year and Rate Your Music, where on the former, it is currently the 3rd highest-rated album of 2018 and on the latter, the 4th highest.

== Release ==
Crumbling was released independently in South Korea on July 31, 2018 and in United States on August 7, 2018. It was released in Japan on December 4, 2018 by Botanical House. The album was reissued on September 20, 2019 by Topshelf Records.

== Critical reception ==
Weiv described Crumbling as "the power of faint sounds." Reggie MT of Tiny Mix Tapes declared that the album is "much like its spiritual predecessor, alternately chillaxed and maximalist, calming and rousing." It ranked on Pretty Much Amazing's 2018: Year in Review list at number 22, while the writer stated that "at first listen, Mid-Air Thief sounds like a Grizzly Bear clone, but upon further listening, this is pacific island pop you didn't know you wanted."

== Track listing ==
All lyrics written by Mid-Air Thief and Summer Soul; all music written by Mid-Air Thief.

No.	Title	Length
1.	"Why?" ("왜?")	4:41
2.	"Ahhhh, These Chains!" ("쇠사슬")	5:07
3.	"Gameun Deut" ("감은 듯")	5:03
4.	"Curve and Light" ("곡선과 투과광")	4:20
5.	"Crumbling Together" ("함께 무너지기")	9:38
6.	"Protector" ("수호자")	5:22
7.	"Dirt" ("흙")	6:21
8.	"No Answer" ("무소식")	3:32

== Personnel ==
Credits adapted from the liner notes of Crumbling.

=== Musicians ===
- Mid-Air Thief – instruments, music
- Summer Soul – backing vocals
- Ko Jae-Hyun – instruments

=== Artwork ===
- Shin Hye-Jung – artwork
