= Sky Blue (film) =

2003 South Korean animated film

- Korean theatrical release poster
- Hangul: 원더풀 데이즈
- RR: Wondeopul deijeu
- MR: Wŏndŏp'ul teijŭ
- Directed by: Kim Moon-saeng
- Written by: Kim Moon-saeng; Park Jun-Yong
- Produced by: Hwang K. S.; Kyeong Hag Lee
- Starring: Ji Hoon Choi; Yeong Seon Eun; In Seong O; Kim Jong-kook
- Music by: Won Il; Jung Jae-il
- Production companies: Endgame Entertainment; Masquerade Films; Maxmedia; Tin House Productions
- Distributed by: Palisades Tartan (English releases); Gainax (Japan); Pathé (France)
- Release date: July 17, 2003
- Running time: 86 minutes (original release); 95 minutes (director's cut)
- Country: South Korea
- Languages: Korean; English
- Budget: $13 million

Wonderful Days (released in the US and UK as Sky Blue) is a South Korean adult animated science fiction film released in 2003, written and directed by Kim Moon-saeng. It features backdrops rendered using photo-realistic computer-generated imagery (CGI), comparable to those in the film Final Fantasy: The Spirits Within, along with the use of highly detailed models for some of the backdrops into which the cel animated characters were then animated. However, convincing CGI animation of humans (especially human movement) was not attempted. The backgrounds in the film were shot with traditional motion control techniques, then processed to look like computer graphics. The vehicles were all rendered, and the characters were cel animated.

== Plot ==
Wonderful Days is set in the year 2142. Environmental pollution has led to a breakdown of human civilization. A technologically advanced city named Ecoban was built and it harvests energy from the DELOS System, which uses pollution in a carbonite catalyzed reaction to generate power. Carbonite extraction is carried out by people who live outside the city in the surrounding wasteland. Among them is an enigmatic young man known as Shua. He ends up in a love triangle with his childhood friend, a girl named Jay, and her superior, Ecoban security commander Cade as his rival.

The film deals with environmental destruction, pollution and class struggle.

== Voice cast ==
Character	Korean voice actor	English voice actor
Shua	Choi Ji Hoon; Maeng Se-chang (Young)	Marc Worden; Cathy Cavadini (Young)
Jay	Eun Yeong Seon; Kim Hee-jung (Young)	Cathy Cavadini; Rebecca Wink (Young)
Cade/Simon	Oh In Seong	Kirk Thornton
Commander Locke	Tak Won-Je (Theatrical Cut); Yu In-chon (Director's Cut)	David Naughton
Dr. Noah	Kim Byung-kwan (Theatrical Cut); Ki Joo-bong (Director's Cut)	David Naughton
Woody	Kim Sung Min	Rebecca Wink
Cheyenne/Karen	Eun Seo-woo	Cathy Cavadini
Goliath/Cheol-han (철한)	Si Yeong-joon	Bob Papenbrook
Zed/David	Ahn Yong Wook	Andrew Ableson
Moe/Joe	Park Ji Hoon	Karl Wiedergott
Maya/Etha	Yeo Min-jeong	Sunmin Park
Governor	Kim Myung-kook	Bob Papenbrook
Typon	Kim Soo-jung	Bob Papenbrook
Dispatcher	TBA	Jamie Simone
Sentry	TBA	Mark Lindsay
Digger Leader	TBA	Andrew Ableson
Digger Foreman	TBA	Karl Wiedergott
Trooper(s)	TBA	Jeffrey Winter; Marc Scarpa; Mark Lindsay

== Production ==
Kim Moon-saeng made his feature directorial debut after having previously directed commercials for various advertising agencies.

Along with CG effects, a set of miniatures for buildings, mechanics, and characters were built and filmed with HDW-F900 which was co-developed by Sony and Lucasfilm and one of two prototype Frazier lens (the other was used for Star Wars by Lucasfilm).

Micah Wright and Jay Lender contributed to the script of the film, although they have not been credited in the final film.

== Releases ==
The film has been released in numerous Western countries such as the US and Great Britain under the title Sky Blue. The Western release was edited from the Korean version, with two minutes cut and additional music by Sam Spiegel being added. Other Western countries such as France and Finland have kept its original title—which is a Hangul transliteration of the English phrase "Wonderful Days" (it would be rendered in Revised Romanization as "Wondeopul Deijeu"). An all-region 2-disc collector's edition DVD to the dubbed version of the film was released in the UK on November 14, 2005. A Blu-ray of the film was eventually released in the UK on June 8, 2008. A planned North American Blu-ray release from Palisades Tartan was cancelled following the company's closure.

In Japan, the film was adapted by Gainax. According to adaptation director Hiroshi Yamaga, Gainax changed the direction of the film to make the dialogue less "alien" to Japanese viewers.

The film was released on DVD in Korea on September 6, 2003. On May 27, 2004, the film was re-released on a 3-disc limited original edition DVD in Korea that features a director's cut of the film. This version includes 9 minutes of additional footage that wasn't present in the original cut, plus a few changes to the dialogue. On May 15, 2013, the director's cut was released on Blu-ray, but uses the bonus material from the DVD to the theatrical cut.

== Festivals ==
Wonderful Days was screened at the following film festivals:

- Sitges International Film Festival, 2003;
- San Sebastian International Film Festival, 2003;
- Cannes Film Festival, 2003;
- Sundance Film Festival, 2004;
- Brussels Fantasy Film Festival, 2004;
- Annecy International Animation Film Festival, 2004;
- Venice Film Festival, 2004;
- Tokyo Film Festival, 2004;
- London Film Festival, 2004;
- Holland Animation Film Festival, 2004;
- San Francisco Film Festival, 2004;
- Grand Prix Anim'arts, Gérardmer, 2004;
