= The Siesta =

The Siesta may refer to:

- The Siesta (Van Gogh), painting by Vincent van Gogh
- The Siesta (Paul Gauguin), painting by Paul Gauguin

== See also ==
- Siesta
