= Siesta (album) =

Studio album by Zzzaam
- Released: 2000
- Genre: Shoegaze, dream pop
- Length: 47:31
- Label: Self-released (2000); Poclanos (2023)

Zzzaam chronology
Siesta (2000)	Requiem #1 (2002)

Siesta (Korean: 낮잠; RR: natjam) is the debut studio album by South Korean shoegaze band Zzzaam. The album was released in 2000 and was initially released in limited physical CDs only, and the remastered version was released with online streaming on 15 January 2023.

== Background ==
Zzzaam was formed in 1997 and gained popularity by performing at several live clubs in Hongdae. The album was initially produced with only a limited number of CDs. The band had been inactive for a long time since the release of their third album in 2004, but announced online streaming of the album with the resumption of activities in 2023.

== Critical reception ==
John Wohlmacher of Beats Per Minute reviewed "Combining the distorted, psychedelic folk of The Velvet Underground with the guitar washes of Slowdive and Pale Saints and the hazy vocals of Kevin Shields, Seoul’s zzzaam created a sound that is wholly unique." Na Wonyoung of Weiv described the album as "They made an album that felt like they were taking a shallow nap on a drowsy day: moving between reality and dreams of sleeping with various shoegaze noises." Visla Magazine's Jeong Imyong said "Other works on the theme of 'sleep' are usually extended to 'dream' and expressed as a floating sound, but Siesta depicts somewhere between the increasingly blurred consciousness and unconsciousness, excluding techniques."

== Track listing ==
No.	Title	Length
1.	"Fragrance (Reminiscent of Rain)" ("향 (비의 연상에서)")	3:03
2.	"Fragrance (Reminiscent of Dust)" ("향 (먼지의 연상에서)")	6:19
3.	"Joke" ("농담")	3:35
4.	"Siesta" ("낮잠")	8:18
5.	"Hesitation" ("망설임")	5:29
6.	"Blurredly" ("흐리게")	5:47
7.	"Let's Go to the Beach" ("해변으로가요")	3:20
8.	"?"	5:51
9.	"Sunday"	2:14
10.	"Flu" ("독감")	3:35
