= Haute Couture (album) =

Studio album by Glen Check
- Released: February 28, 2012
- Genre: Electropop, synth-pop
- Length: 37:11
- Label: Soundholic
- Producer: Glen Check

Glen Check chronology
Disco Elevator (2011)	Haute Couture (2012)	Youth! (2013)

Haute Couture is the debut studio album by South Korean electropop band Glen Check. The album was released on February 28, 2012. The album won the Best Dance & Electronic Album at the 2013 Korean Music Awards.

== Background ==
Glen Check went to France and Belgium during the production of the Haute Couture. They said they referred to the sounds of percussion played by street players and sounds from the cathedral in there. They interviewed IZM that they focused the most on synth-pop style of the album, referencing music by Joy Division, New Order, and Duran Duran.

== Critical reception ==
Professional ratings
Review scores
Source	Rating
IZM	3.5/5 stars
Weiv	8/10

Kim Banya of IZM reviewed "Their ability lies in a 'sense of balance' that doesn't lose its balance. No instrument claims or disputes itself, and the order of the album is also balanced with tension and relaxation." Cha Woojin of Weiv described "Most of the tracks on Haute Couture have the impression of a melody on top of a drum, and on that solid foundation, the melody flies to its heart's content."

== Track listing ==
No.	Title	Length
1.	"The Naked Sun"	4:04
2.	"Vogue Boys And Girls"	4:19
3.	"French Virgin Party"	3:10
4.	"The Flashback"	3:54
5.	"Rebellion"	3:17
6.	"Battaille!"	1:13
7.	"Au Revoir"	2:39
8.	"Concorde"	3:59
9.	"60's Cardin"	3:18
10.	"Racket"	3:28
11.	"Vivid"	3:50
Total length:		37:11
