= Lee Tzsche =

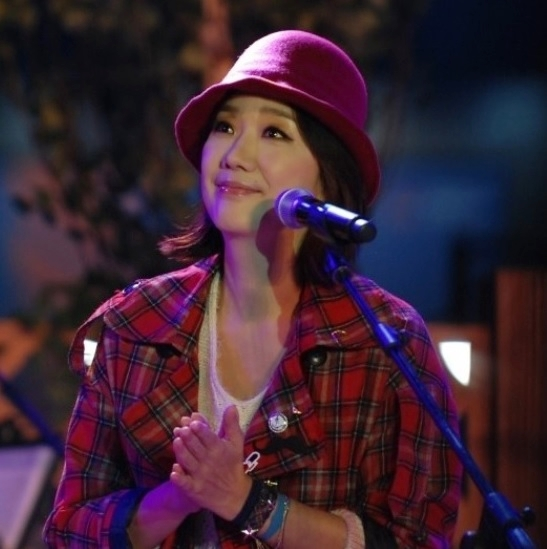
- Lee in 2014
- Born: Lee Sang-eun; March 12, 1970 (age 56); Seoul, South Korea
- Education: Hanyang University (dropped out)
- Alma mater: Pratt Institute
- Occupations: Singer; songwriter
- Years active: 1988–present
- Musical career
- Genres: Pop; ballad
- Instrument: Vocals
- Label: Breeze Music

Korean name
- Hangul: 이상은
- Hanja: 李尙恩
- RR: I Sangeun
- MR: I Sangŭn

Stage name
- Hangul: 리채
- RR: Richae
- MR: Rich'ae

Lee Sang-eun (Korean: 이상은; born March 12, 1970), also known by the stage name Lee Tzsche (Korean: 리채), is a South Korean singer-songwriter. She debuted in 1988 and released 15 full-length albums. She won the Rookie Artist Award at the 1988 Golden Disc Awards and Female Musician of the Year at the 2004 and 2006 Korean Music Awards.

== Biography ==
She debuted at the MBC Riverside Music Festival in 1988, singing another composer's song. At the time, she maintained a unisex look and she became popular, but she grew disenchanted with the entertainment business and, taking a sabbatical, went to Japan and the US to study art.

Her second career as a musician began with 'Slow day' (1991), a short but impressive album with adolescent girl's feel to it. 'Begin' (1992) was a transitional album - it had an R&B or house sound with the producer Kim Hong-soon, but few fans appreciated the change.

The 5th and self-titled album 'Lee Sang-eun' (1993) showed more musical maturity. Soon she went to Japan and worked with Japanese musicians, most notably Takeda Hajimu (竹田元). Her 6th album 'GongMuDoHaGa(公無渡河歌)' (1995) has been called 'an introspective reflection.' It has been suggested that she did 'far better' in Japan than her native country, and she received wide name recognition and was regarded as an artist rather than a pop idol. The rich and overlapped sound production showed her ambition as a music director. She returned to simple sounds in the 7th album 'OiRobGo UtGin GaGe' (1997). With her back-band, the Penguins (with Takeda Hajimu) she became a troubadour with a serene mood.

From the 8th and self-titled 'Lee Tszche' (1997), she released albums aimed at the worldwide market with Toshiba EMI. She recorded in America with American session musicians. Half of the tracks were English versions of her older songs, and the other half were new tracks in English. It led to a second English album 'Asian Prescription' (1999). In 2001 she featured on a song on CB Mass's album Massmatics, titled 흔적.

== Discography ==
=== Studio albums ===
- (1989) Happy Birthday
- (1989) I'll Love (사랑할거야)
- (1991) Slow Days (더딘하루)
- (1992) Begin
- (1993) Lee Sang-eun
- (1995) Gongmudohaga (공무도하가)
- (1997) Lonely Funny Store (외롭고 웃긴 가게)
- (1998) Lee-Tzsche
- (1999) Asian Prescription
- (2001) Endless Lay
- (2003) Mysterium (신비체험)
- (2005) Romantopia
- (2007) The Third Place
- (2010) We Are Made of Stardust
- (2014) LuLu
- (2019) fLoW

== Awards ==
Year	Award	Category	Nominated work	Ref.
1988	Golden Disc Awards	Rookie Artist Award	"Dam-da-di" (담다디)	
2004	Korean Music Awards	Female Musician of the Year	Mysterium	
2006	Korean Music Awards	Female Musician of the Year	Romantopia	
