= Bluedawn =

South Korean musical duo

- Hangul: 푸른새벽
- Revised Romanization: Pureun Saebyeok
- McCune–Reischauer: P'urŭn Saebyŏk

Bluedawn was an indie folk rock duo from South Korea.

The band members included Dawn (real name: Han Hui-Jeong, 한희정; voice, acoustic guitar, piano and programming) and Ssoro (sometimes spelled "Sorrow"; real name: Jeong Sang-Hun, 정상훈; electric guitar, acoustic guitar, voice, and programming). The group was active in the early 2000s and released two albums and one CD containing two EPs. Their 2003 album Bluedawn features the additional musicians Orange_drink (drums) and yjroom (electric guitar) on the song "Sonyeon" ("소년").

The duo disbanded in late 2006 or early 2007, following the recording of their final album, When Spring Comes (보옴이 오면). Dawn is expected to release her first solo album on the Pastel Music label.

On November 16, 2012, Jeong Sang-Hun announced on his Twitter account that Bluedawn would be reuniting to release a Christmas album in December 2012.

== Discography ==
- 2003 - Bluedawn (Lo-fi cavare sound)
- 2005 - Submarine Sickness + Waveless (Pastel Music)
- 2006 - When Spring Comes (보옴이 오면) (CJ Media Line)
- 2012 - Blue Christmas
