= Kim Moon-saeng =

South Korean animator and film director

Kim Moon-saeng (Korean: 김문생, born 1 January 1961) is a South Korean animator, director and screenwriter.

== Biography ==
Kim is one of the best-known commercial directors in Korea. His experience has been focused on special effects with animation film for over 15 years. During this period, he has directed more than 200 TV commercials including products like Fanta (Buzz 2-D & 3-D complex animation: awarded gold medal at the 27th Creative Award USA, Korean Broadcasting Commercial Award 1988, Seoul Int'l Creative Animation Festival Award 1996, Pinnacle finalist 1997). From 1998, he has worked with Hong Kong–based international advertising agencies such as Oglivy & Mather and JWT. He also serves as a professor at the Kaywon Art School, teaching film design.

== Wonderful Days ==
In 2003, Kim created the post-apocalyptic animated film Wonderful Days (called Sky Blue in the US and UK), his first and so far only feature film to date. It tells the story of an ethnic group of people known as Diggers who attempt to destroy the last, polluting city on Earth.
