= Munhwa Ilbo =

South Korean daily newspaper

- Type: Daily newspaper
- Format: Print, online
- Owner: Munhwa Ilbo Co.
- Founded: 1991; 35 years ago
- Political alignment: Conservatism
- Language: Korean
- Website: munhwa.com

Korean name
- Hangul: 문화일보
- Hanja: 文化日報
- Lit.: Culture Daily
- RR: Munhwa ilbo
- MR: Munhwa ilbo

Munhwa Ilbo (Korean: 문화일보) is a daily newspaper in South Korea. It was established in August 1990, and printed its first issue on 1 November 1991.

== History ==
Munhwa Ilbo was formerly owned by the Hyundai; however, Hyundai relinquished their control of the newspaper after the 1997 Asian financial crisis, at the same time as their competitor Hanwha gave up its own daily, the Kyunghyang Shinmun. Munhwa Ilbo was Hyundai's first target for separation as it begin trying to slim down its vast business empire; the divestiture was part of a larger trend at the time of chaebol selling off non-core assets and reducing excessive diversification. The newspaper was officially established as a separate financial entity in May 1998.

They opened an online edition in May 1997. Since April 2005, they have had a partnership for sharing of news content and photographs with No Cut News.

== Incidents ==
In January 2002, Munhwa Ilbo began to publish a serial novel Gangan Namja (강안남자) about the sexual exploits of a divorced car salesman, which attracted some public controversy. From 2002 to 2006, the newspaper received 28 warnings from the Korea Press Ethics Commission (KPEC) over the novel's content. On 2 November 2006, the presidential Blue House cut 57 of its subscriptions to the newspaper. They claimed it was because female employees of the Blue House had protested about Gangan Namja. Fellow dailies The Chosun Ilbo, JoongAng Ilbo, and The Dong-A Ilbo criticised the Blue House's action as "government coercion of the press". However, Kim U-ryong of the Hankuk University of Foreign Studies and Kim Eon-gyeong of the Citizens' Coalition for Democratic Media both described the novel as "obscene" and criticised its publication in a newspaper read by young people. Grand National Party spokeswoman Na Kyung-won issued a statement opining that the real reason for the Blue House's subscription cancellation was Munhwa Ilbo's criticism of the presidential administration, an accusation which a Blue House spokesman denied.

On 13 September 2007, Munhwa Ilbo printed nude photos of Dongguk University professor Shin Jeong-ah, claiming that they were evidence of Shin's inappropriate relationship with university president Byeon Yang-kyoon. However, the KPEC rejected Munhwa Ilbo's explanation, and ordered the daily to apologise, stating that they had damaged the dignity of all print media. Shin's lawyer stated that she planned to sue the newspaper for libel. They published the apology on the front page of their 18 October 2007 edition; however, the apology itself attracted criticism from the Korea Sexual Violence Relief Center, and the KPEC indicated that they would review the matter again to decide whether the newspaper's statement actually constituted a proper apology. In the end, Shin filed suit over the photos and the newspaper's coverage of her, receiving W150 million (US$113,000) in compensation in December 2008.
