= Korean Music Awards =

South Korean music award

- Current: 23rd Korean Music Awards
- Korean Music Awards trophy
- Awarded for: Excellence in music
- Sponsored by: Ministry of Culture, Sports and Tourism; Korea Creative Content Agency
- Country: South Korea
- First award: March 17, 2004; 22 years ago
- Website: Official website

- Korean Music Awards
- Hangul: 한국대중음악상
- Hanja: 韓國大眾音樂賞
- RR: Hanguk daejungeumaksang
- MR: Han'guk taejungŭmaksang

The Korean Music Awards (Korean: 한국대중음악상; lit. 'Korean Popular Music Awards') is an annual South Korean music awards show that honors both mainstream and underground musical artists from a variety of genres. Unlike other major South Korean music awards, which largely rely on record sales to determine winners, the Korean Music Awards distributes awards based on the recommendations of a panel of judges consisting of music critics, radio show producers, academics, and other professionals within the industry. The first ceremony was held in 2004, and is regarded as one of the most prestigious music awards in the country.

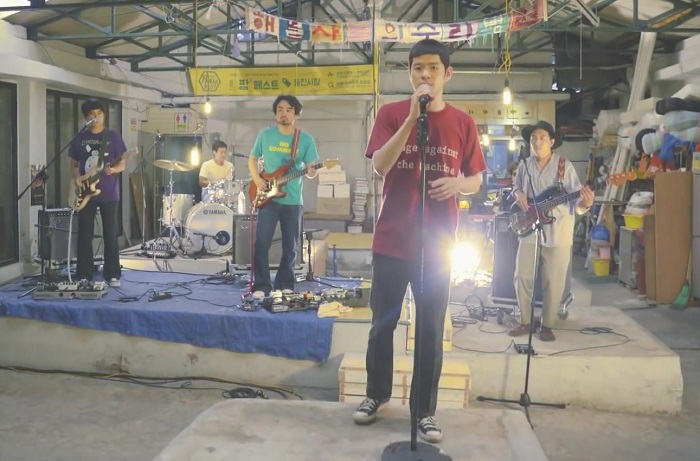
Kiha & The Faces is the only artist to win all three Grand Prizes (Musician, Album & Song of the Year.) The band is also the joint most decorated artist in KMA history with 7 awards, along with BTS.

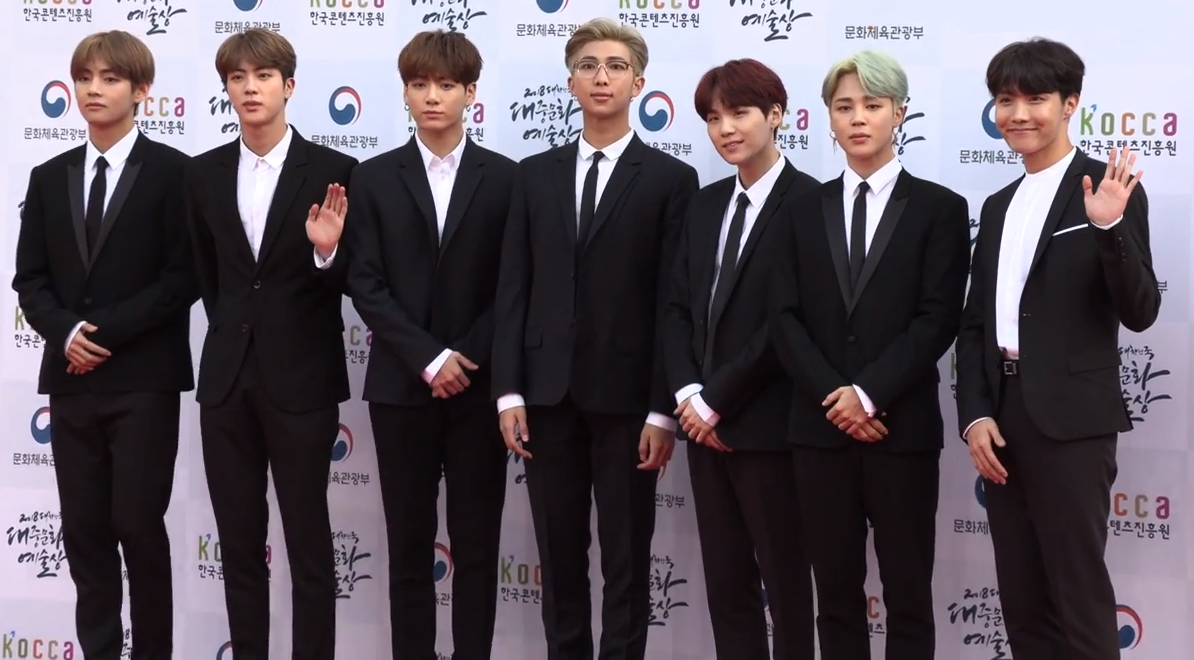
7-time award winner BTS made history in 2019 by becoming the first artist to win Musician of the Year two years in a row. At the 18th Awards ceremony, they became the first artist to win Song of the Year twice.

== Ceremonies ==
Edition	Year	Date	Ref.
1st	2004	March 17	
2nd	2005	March 22	
3rd	2006	April 14	
4th	2007	March 6	
5th	2008	March 5	
6th	2009	February 26	
7th	2010	March 30	
8th	2011	February 23	
9th	2012	February 29	
10th	2013	February 28	
11th	2014	February 28	
12th	2015	February 26	
13th	2016	February 29	
14th	2017	February 28	
15th	2018	February 28	
16th	2019	February 26	
17th	2020	February 27	
18th	2021	February 28	
19th	2022	March 1	
20th	2023	March 5	
21st	2024	February 29	
22nd	2025	February 27	
23rd	2026	February 26	

== Categories ==
The event currently has approximately 20 categories, including the Musician of the Year, Album of the Year, Song of the Year, Rookie of the Year, and genre awards in pop, rock, modern rock, metal & hardcore, folk, dance & electronic, hip hop, R&B & soul, and jazz & crossover music.

== Musician of the Year (Grand Prize) ==
Year	Winner(s)		
2026	Hanroro	—	—
2025	Lee Seung-yoon	—	—
2024	Silica Gel	—	—
2023	250	—	—
2022	BTS	—	—
2021	Leenalchi	—	—
2020	Kim Oki	—	—
2019	BTS	—	—
2018	BTS	—	—
2017	Jay Park	—	—
2016	Deepflow	—	—
2015	Lee Seung-hwan	—	—
2014	Sunwoo Jung-a	—	—
2013	Psy	—	—
2012	Kiha & The Faces	—	—
2011	Galaxy Express	—	—
2010	Seoul Electric Band	—	—
2009	Toy	—	—
2008	Yi Sung-yol	—	—
2007	Lee Ji-hyung	Park Seon-joo	No Brain
2006	Cho Kyu-chan	Lee Tzsche	W
2005	Lee Seung-chul	Lee So-ra	Clazziquai Project
2004	Wheesung	Lee Tzsche	Big Mama

Note: The award for Musician of the Year was divided into Male, Female and Group awards from 2004 to 2007.

== Album of the Year (Grand Prize) ==
Year	Winner	Album
2026	Chudahye Chagis	Sosuminjok
2025	Danpyunsun and the Moments Ensemble	Hail to the Music
2024	Beenzino	Nowitzki
2023	250	Ppong
2022	Lang Lee	There is a Wolf
2021	Jeongmilla	CheongPa Sonata
2020	Baek Yerin	Our Love Is Great
2019	Jang Pill Soon	Soony Eight:소길花
2018	Kang Tae-gu	bleu
2017	Jo Dong-jin	As A Tree
2016	E Sens	The Anecdote
2015	Loro's	W.A.N.D.Y
2014	Yoon Young-bae	Dangerous World
2013	3rd Line Butterfly	Dreamtalk
2012	Kiha & The Faces	Kiha & The Faces
2011	Garion	Garion 2
2010	Seoul Electric Band	Life Is Strange
2009	Sister's Barbershop	Most Ordinary Existence
2008	Lee Juck	Songs Made of Wood
2007	Swallow	Aresco
2006	Second Moon	Second Moon
2005	My Aunt Mary	Just Pop
2004	The The	The The Band

== Song of the Year (Grand Prize) ==
Year	Winner	Song
2026	Lee Chan-hyuk	"Endangered Love"
2025	Aespa	"Supernova"
2024	NewJeans	"Ditto"
2023	Younha	"Event Horizon"
2022	Aespa	"Next Level"
2021	BTS	"Dynamite"
2020	Jannabi	"For Lovers Who Hesitate"
2019	BTS	"Fake Love"
2018	Hyukoh	"Tomboy"
2017	Bolbbalgan4	"Galaxy"
2016	Big Bang	"Bae Bae"
2015	So-you & Junggigo	"Some"
2014	Cho Yong-pil	"Bounce"
2013	Psy	"Gangnam Style"
2012	IU	"Good Day"
2011	Hot Potato	"Confession"
2010	Girls' Generation	"Gee"
2009	Kiha & The Faces	"Cheap Coffee"
2008	Lee Juck	"It's Fortunate"
2007	Lee Han-chul	"Superstar"
2006	Yoon Do-hyun	"It Must Have Been Love"
2005	Cho PD	"Friend"
2004	Loveholics	"Loveholic"

== Rookie of the Year ==
Year	Winner
2026	Huijun Woo
2025	Sanmanhan
2024	Kiss of Life
2023	NewJeans
2022	Aespa
2021	Meaningful Stone
2020	Sogumm
2019	Airy
2018	Se So Neon
2017	Silica Gel
2016	Hyukoh
2015	Kim Sa-wol & Kim Hae-won
2014	Rock 'n Roll Radio
2013	404
2012	Bye Bye Bad Man
2011	Gate Flowers
2010	Guckkasten, Apollo 18
2009	Loro's
2008	Younha
2007	The Mustangs
2006	Second Moon, Sogyumo Acacia Band
2005	MOT
2004	Jung Jae-il

== Genre Awards ==
=== Best Pop Album ===
Year	Winner	Album
2026	Lee Chan-hyuk	Eros
2025	John Park	PSST!
2024	Lee Jin-ah	Hearts of the City
2023	Lee Chan-hyuk	Error
2022	IU	Lilac
2021	Yerin Baek	Every Letter I Sent You
2020	Yerin Baek	Our Love Is Great
2019	Jang Pill Soon	Soony Eight:소길花
2018	IU	Palette
2017	Jo Dong-jin	As A Tree
2016	Ravie Nuage	Youth
2015	Akdong Musician	Play
2014	Sunwoo Jung-a	It's Okay, Dear
2013	Busker Busker	Busker Busker 1st Album
2012	Neon Bunny	Seoulight
2011	Cho Kyu-chan	9
2010	Lee So-ra	7th Album
2009	Kim Dong-ryool	Monologue
2008	Lee Juck	Songs Made of Wood
2007	Park Seon-joo	A4rism
2006	W	Where the Story Ends
2005	Clazziquai Project	Instant Pig

=== Best Pop Song ===
Year	Winner	Song
2026	Lee Chan-hyuk	"Endangered Love"
2025	Bibi	"Bam Yang Gang"
2024	AKMU	"Love Lee"
2023	Younha	"Event Horizon"
2022	AKMU	"Nakka" (with IU)
2021	BTS	"Dynamite"
2020	Baek Yerin	"Maybe It's Not Our Fault"
2019	BTS	"Fake Love"
2018	Red Velvet	"Red Flavor"
2017	Wonder Girls	"Why So Lonely"
2016	Big Bang	"Loser"
2015	So-you & Junggigo	"Some"
2014	Cho Yong-pil	"Bounce"
2013	Busker Busker	"Yeosu Night Sea"
2012	IU	"Good Day"
2011	10cm	"Tonight I'm Afraid of the Dark"
2010	Lee So-ra	"Track8"
2009	Toy	"Passionate Goodbye"
2008	Lee Juck	"It's Fortunate"
2007	Lee Han-chul	"Superstar"
2006	Lucid Fall	"Oh, Love"

=== Best K-Pop Album ===
Year	Winner	Album
2026	Jennie	Ruby
2025	Aespa	Armageddon
2024	NewJeans	Get Up
2023	NewJeans	New Jeans
2022	Chungha	Querencia

=== Best K-Pop Song ===
Year	Winner	Song
2026	Jennie	"Like Jennie"
2025	Aespa	"Supernova"
2024	NewJeans	"Ditto"
2023	NewJeans	"Attention"
2022	Aespa	"Next Level"

=== Best Rock Album ===
Year	Winner	Album
2025	Soumbalgwang	Fire & Light
2024	OVerdrive Philosophy	64 See Me
2023	Concorde	Supersonic Airliner
2022	Soumbalgwang	Happiness, Flower
2021	ABTB	Daydream
2020	Jambinai	ONDA
2019	Life and Time	Age
2018	Lowdown 30	B
2017	ABTB	Attraction Between Two Bodies
2016	The Monotones	Into The Night
2015	Danpyunsun and the Sailors	Animal
2014	Yellow Monsters	Red Flag
2013	Jung Cha-shik	Turbulent Modern Times
2012	Kiha & The Faces	Kiha & The Faces
2011	Crash	The Paragon of Animals
2010	Seoul Electronic Band	Life Is Strange
2009	Galaxy Express	Noise On Fire
2008	Hollow Jan	Rough Draft in Progress
2007	The Mustangs	The Mustangs
2006	Black Hole	Hero
2005	Vassline	Blood of Immortality
2004	Cocore	Super Stars

=== Best Rock Song ===
Year	Winner	Song
2025	Lee Seung-yoon	"Anthems of Defiance"
2024	Seoul Electric Band	"Ghost Writers"
2023	Jambinai	"from the place been erased (feat. Sunwoo Jung-a)"
2022	Soumbalgwang	"Dance"
2021	ABTB (feat. YoonChul Shin)	"Daydream"
2020	Jambinai	"ONDA"
2019	Life and Time	"Jamsugyo"
2018	Se So Neon	"The Wave"
2017	Jun Bum Sun And The Yangbans	"Revolution"
2016	Lowdown 30	"More Burning"
2015	Asian Chairshot	"Haeya"
2014	Yellow Monsters	"Red Flag"
2013	Jung Cha-shik	"Street Musician"
2012	Kiha & The Faces	"That Kind of Relationship"
2011	Gate Flowers	"Reserves"
2010	Guckkasten	"Mirror"
2009	Kiha & The Faces	"Cheap Coffee"
2008	Mary Epic	"Can't be Happy Without You"
2007	Strikers	"Turn Back Time"
2006	Black Hole	"Life"

=== Best Modern Rock Album ===
Year	Winner	Album
2025	Danpyunsun and the Moments Ensemble	Hail to the Music
2024	Silica Gel	Machine Boy
2023	The Black Skirts	Teen Troubles
2022	Wings of the Isang	The Borderline Between Hope and Despair
2021	Jo Dongik	Blue Pillow
2020	The Black Skirts	THIRSTY
2019	Say Sue Me	Where We Were Together
2018	Hyukoh	23
2017	Wings of the Isang	Stream of Consciousness
2016	The Koxx	The New Normal
2015	Loro's	W.A.N.D.Y
2014	Yoon Young-bae	Dangerous World
2013	3rd Line Butterfly	Dreamtalk
2012	Lee Seung-yeol	Why We Fail
2011	9 and the Numbers	9 and the Numbers
2010	The Black Skirts	201
2009	Sister's Barbershop	Most Ordinary Existence
2008	MOT	Strange seasons
2008	Huckleberry Finn	Fantasies... My Disillusionment
2007	Swallow	Aresco
2006	Mongoose	Dancing Zoo
2005	My Aunt Mary	Just Pop

=== Best Modern Rock Song ===
Year	Winner	Song
2025	Lee Seung-yoon	"Waterfall"
2024	Silica Gel	"Tik Tak Tok (feat. So!YoON!)"
2023	Silica Gel	"No Pain"
2022	Silica Gel	"Desert Eagle"
2021	Leenalchi	"Tiger Is Coming"
2020	Jannabi	"For Lovers Who Hesitate"
2019	Say Sue Me	"Old Town"
2018	Hyukoh	"Tomboy"
2017	9 and the Numbers	"Song for Tuvalu"
2016	Hyukoh	"Comes and Goes"
2015	9 and the Numbers	"Hide and Seek"
2014	Yoon Young-bae	"Dangerous World"
2013	3rd Line Butterfly	"The Day We Breakup is Today"
2012	Lee Seung-yeol	"Not Coming Back"
2011	Broccoli, You Too?	"Graduation"
2010	Broccoli, You Too?	"Universal Song"
2009	Sister's Barbershop	"Beautiful thing"
2008	Lee Seung-yeol	"Adonai"
2007	Roller Coaster	"Popular Song"
2006	Seoul Electric Band	"Come into My Dream"

=== Best Metal & Hardcore Album ===
Year	Winner	Album
2025	Seaweed Mustache	2
2024	Mahatma	Reason For Silence
2023	Madmans Esprit	I See Myself Through You Who See Us Through Me
2022	Agnes	Hegemony Shift
2021	Remnants of the Fallen	All the Wounded and Broken
2020	Method	Definition of Method
2019	Dark Mirror ov Tragedy	The Lord ov Shadows
2018	Abyss	Recrowned
2017	Remnants of the Fallen	Shadow Walk
2016	Method	Abstract

=== Best Folk Album ===
Year	Winner	Album
2025	Moher	Kaleidoscope
2024	Yeoyu and Seolbin	Comedy
2023	Line and Circle	Night and Day
2022	Lang Lee	There is a Wolf
2021	Jeongmilla	ChungPa Sonata
2020	Chun Yongsung	Year of Kim Il-sung’s Death
2019	Kim Sa-wol	Romance
2018	Kang Tae-gu	bleu
2017	Minhwi Lee	Borrowed Tongue
2016	Kim Sa-wol	Suzanne
2015	Kim Sa-wol & Kim Hae-won	Secret

=== Best Folk Song ===
Year	Winner	Song
2025	Kang A-sol	"Anyone But Me"
2024	Yeoyu and Seolbin	"Like the Stars in the Night Sky"
2023	Line and Circle	"Night and Day"
2022	Chun Yong-sung	"Barley Tea" (feat. Kang Mal-geum)
2021	Jeongmilla	"Departing from Seoul Station"
2020	Chun Yongsung	"Heavy Snow Watch"
2019	Kim Sa-wol	"Someone"
2018	Kang Tae-gu	"bleu"
2017	Lang Lee	"Playing God"
2016	Kwon Tree	"April, 2014"
2015	Kwon Tree	"Childhood"

=== Best Dance & Electronic Album ===
Year	Winner	Album
2025	Net Gala	Galapaggot
2024	Yetsuby	My Star My Planet My Earth
2023	250	Ppong
2022	Haepaary	Born By Gorgeousness
2021	Mogwaa	Open Mind
2020	Lim Kim	Generasian
2019	Mid-Air Thief	Crumbling
2018	Idiotape	Dystopian
2017	Kirara	Moves
2016	Trampauline	MARGINAL
2015	HEO	Structure
2014	Glen Check	Youth
2013	Glen Check	Haute Couture
2012	Idiotape	11111101
2011	2NE1	To Anyone
2010	Brown Eyed Girls	Sound-G
2009	W&Whale	Hardboiled
2008	House Rulez	Mojito
2007	Uhm Jung-hwa	Prestige

=== Best Dance & Electronic Song ===
Year	Winner	Song
2025	Mount XLR	"Oving"
2024	Cifika	"Hush"
2023	250	"Bang Bus (뱅버스)"
2022	Haepaary	"Go to GPD and Then"
2021	Aseul	"Bye Bye Summer"
2020	Lim Kim	"SAL-KI"
2019	Yeseo	"Honey, Don't Kill My Vibe"
2018	CIFIKA	"My Ego"
2017	Hitchhiker	"$10"
2016	Flash Flood Darlings	"Star"
2015	Yoon Sang	"If You Wanna Console Me"
2014	Exo	"Growl"
2013	f(x)	"Electric Shock"
2012	2NE1	"I Am the Best"
2011	Miss A	"Bad Girl Good Girl"
2010	Brown Eyed Girls	"Abracadabra"
2009	W&Whale	"R.P.G Shine"
2008	Wonder Girls	"Tell Me"
2007	Peppertones	"Superfantastic"

=== Best Rap & Hip Hop Album ===
Year	Winner	Album
2025	B-Free & Hukky Shibaseki	Free Hukky Shibaseki & the God Sun Symphony Group: Odyssey. 1
2024	Beenzino	Nowitzki
2023	Nucksal & CADEJO	Sincerely Yours
2022	Choi LB	Independent Music
2021	Khundi Panda	GAROSAWK
2020	C Jamm	Keung
2019	Bassagong	Tang-A
2018	Viann & Khundi Panda	Reconstruction
2017	Hwaji	Zissou
2016	E Sens	The Anecdote
2015	Hwaji	Eat
2014	Paloalto	Chief Life
2013	Soriheda	Soriheda 2
2012	Simo & Mood Schula	Simo & Mood Schula
2011	Garion	Garion2
2010	Drunken Tiger	Feel gHood Muzik: The 8th Wonder
2009	Verbal Jint	Framed
2008	Epik High	Remapping The Human Soul
2007	The Quiett	Q Train
2006	Dynamic Duo	Double Dynamite
2005	Bobby Kim	Beats Within My Soul
2004	Defconn	Lesson 4 The People

=== Best Rap & Hip Hop Song ===
Year	Winner	Song
2025	G-Dragon	"Power"
2024	E Sens	"What the Hell"
2023	Nucksal & CADEJO	"Good Morning Seoul"
2022	Changmo	"Taiji"
2021	Swervy	"Mama Lisa"
2020	E Sens	"Son of a"
2019	XXX	"Gonju Gok"
2018	Woo Won-jae	"We Are"
2017	BewhY	"Forever"
2016	Deepflow	"Cut Cut Cut"
2015	B-Free	"Hot Summer"
2014	Bulhandang Crew	"Robber"
2013	G-Dragon	"One of a Kind"
2012	MC Meta & DJ Wreckx	"Yes, Yes, Ya’ll"
2011	Garion	"Most Urgent" (feat. NUCK)
2010	San E	"Rap Genius"
2009	Dynamic Duo	"Mother's Soup"
2008	Drunken Tiger	"8:45 Heaven"
2007	Koonta & NuoliuNce	"Holding On" (feat. Sean2slow)
2006	Garion	"Mutu"

=== Best R&B & Soul Album ===
Year	Winner	Album
2025	Sumin & Slom	Miniseries 2
2024	Jerd	Bomm
2023	A.Train	PRIVATE PINK
2022	Thama	Don't Die Colors
2021	Sunwoo Jung-a	Serenade
2020	Samuel Seo	The Misfit
2019	Jclef	flaw, flaw
2018	Hippy Was Gipsy	Tree
2017	Jay Park	Everything You Wanted
2016	Samuel Seo	Frameworks
2015	Crush	Crush on You
2014	Zion.T	Red Light
2013	Naul	Principle of My Soul
2012	Boni	1990
2011	Jinbo	Afterwork
2010	Ra.D	Realcollabo
2009	Taeyang	Hot
2008	Yoon Mi-rae	Yoonmirae
2007	Funkafric Booster	One
2006	Windy City	Love Record: Love, Power And Unity
2005	Gummy	It's Different
2004	Yoon Gun	Yoon Gun

=== Best R&B & Soul Song ===
Year	Winner	Song
2025	Jung-in & Mild Beats	"Blame"
2024	Youra	"(Motif)"
2023	Bibi	"Jotto"
2022	Sumin & Slom	"The Gonlan Song"
2021	Chudahye Chagis	"Ritual Dance"
2020	Jclef	"mama, see"
2019	Sumin	"Your Home" (feat. Xin Seha)
2018	Rico	"Paradise"
2017	jeebanoff	"Sungbuk-gu Kids"
2016	Dean	"Pour Up"
2015	Zion.T	"Yanghwa BRDG"
2014	Jinbo	"Fantasy"
2013	Naul	"Wind Memory"
2012	Junggigo	"Blind"
2011	Deez	"Sugar"
2010	Jungyup	"You Are My Lady"
2009	Taeyang	"Only Look at Me"
2008	Yoon Mi-rae	"What's Up! Mr. Good Stuff"
2007	Heritage	"Starlight" (feat. P-Type)
2006	Windy City	"Love Supreme"

=== Best Jazz Performance Album ===
Year	Winner	Album
2025	Jihye Lee Orchestra	Infinite Connections
2024	Soojung Lee	Four Seasons
2023	Youngjoo Song	Atmosphere
2022	Jihye Lee Orchestra	Daring Mind

=== Best Jazz Vocal Album ===
Year	Winner	Album
2025	Nam Ye-ji	Old Songs, Tmmm
2024	Yujin Kim	Extraordinary
2023	Yujin Kim	A Piece and the Whole
2022	Maria Kim	With Strings: Dream of You

=== Best Global Contemporary Album ===
Year	Winner	Album
2025	Bando	Shape of the Land
2024	Dongyi	a method for capsaicinoid analysis
2023	Jung Jae-il	Psalms

== Discontinued awards ==
=== Best Jazz & Crossover Album – Jazz ===
Year	Winner	Song
2021	MALO	Song Changsik Song Book
2020	Kim Oki	Spirit Advance Unit
2019	Sunji Lee	Song of April
2018	Lee Jiyeun Contemporary Jazz Orchestra	Feather, Dream Drop
2017	Choi Sung Ho Singularity	When The Wind Blows
2016	BuYoung Lee	Little Star
2015	Lee Seon-ji	The Night Of The Border
2014	Na Yoon-sun	Lento
2013	Lee Won-sool	Point Of Contact
2012	BG Salon	Repeat, Pause, Play
2011	Na Yoon-sun	Same Girl
2010	Song Young-joo	Love Never Fails
2009	Na Yoon-sun	Voyage

=== Best Jazz & Crossover Album – Crossover ===
Year	Winner	Song
2021	Leenalchi	SUGUNGGA
2020	Black String	Karma
2019	near east quartet	near east quartet
2018	Han Seung-seok & Jung Jae-il	And There, The Sea At Last
2017	Second Moon	Pansori Chunhyang-ga
2016	The NEQ	PASSING OF ILLUSION
2015	Han Seung-seok & Jung Jae-il	Bari abandoned
2014	Salon de Oh Soo-gyeong	Salon de Tango
2013	Jambinai	Différance
2012	Park Joo-won	Fiesta of Sadness
2011	La Ventana	Nostalgia and the Delicate Woman
2010	Park Joo-won	Time Of The Gypsies
2009	Miyeon & Park Je-chun	Dreams From The Ancestor
2004	Na Yoon-sun	Down By Love

Note: The 2004 award was named "Best Crossover Album".

=== Best Jazz & Crossover Album ===
Year	Winner	Song
2008	WoongSan	Yesterday
2007	Seo Young Do Trio	Circle
2006	Second Moon	Second Moon
2005	Jeon Je-deok	Jeon Je-deok

=== Best Jazz & Crossover Song ===
Year	Winner	Song
2008	WoongSan	"Yesterday"
2007	Jangeun Bae Trio	"Secret Place"
2006	Triologue	"It Rain"

=== Best Jazz & Crossover Performance ===
Year	Winner	Song
2021	Soojin Suh	Colorist
2020	Jangeun Bae and Liberation Amalgamation	JB Liberation Amalgamation
2019	Youngjoo Song	Late Fall
2018	Hogyu "Stiger" Hwang Quartet	Straight, No Chaser
2017	Black String	Mask Dance
2016	Cho Eun-min	Oriental Fairy Tale
2015	Kim Changhyun	Oblivion
2014	Kim Oki	Cherubim's Wrath
2013	Kang Tae-hwan	Sorefa
2012	Song Young-joo	Tale of A City
2011	Lee Pan-geun Project	A Rhapsody in Cold Age
2010	Kim Chaek & Jung Jae-il	The Methodologies

=== Best Film & TV Soundtrack Album ===
Year	Winner	Album
2013	Jo Yeong-wook	Nameless Gangster: Rules of the Time OST
2012	Jo Seong-woo	Late Autumn OST
2011	Various artists	Bravo, Jazz Life OST
2010	Lee Byung-woo	Mother OST
2009	Yang Bang-ean	Asian Corridor In Heaven OST
2008	Kim Sang-heon	Que Sera Sera OST
2007	Bang Jun-seok	Radio Star OST
2006	Jo Yeong-wook	Lady Vengeance OST
2005	Various artists	Ireland OST
2004	Lee Byung-woo	Untold Scandal OST

=== Best Performance ===
Year	Winner	Album
2008	Yesanjok	Yesanjok
2007	Seo Young Do Trio	Circle
2006	Triologue	Speak Low
2005	Mowg	Desire

=== Record Label of the Year ===
Year	Winner
2006	Pastel Music
2005	Cavare Sound / JNH
2004	Fluxus Music

=== Group Musician of the Year Netizen Vote ===
Year	Winner
2015	Infinite
2014	EXO
2013	Busker Busker
2012	Infinite
2011	f(x)
2010	Girls' Generation
2009	Wonder Girls

=== Female Musician of the Year Netizen Vote ===
Year	Winner
2016	IU
2015	Park Ye-eun
2014	Lee Hi
2013	Lena Park
2012	IU
2011	Kim Yuna
2010	Baek Ji-young
2009	Younha

=== Male Musician of the Year Netizen Vote ===
Year	Winner
2016	Park Jin-young
2015	Jay Park
2014	G-Dragon
2013	Jay Park
2012	Verbal Jint
2011	Taeyang
2010	Jungyup
2009	Kiha & The Faces

=== Rock Musician of the Year Netizen Vote ===
Year	Winner
2008	No Brain

=== Modern Rock Musician of the Year Netizen Vote ===
Year	Winner
2008	Nell

=== Hip Hop Musician of the Year Netizen Vote ===
Year	Winner
2008	Epik High

=== Pop Musician of the Year Netizen Vote ===
Year	Winner
2008	Younha

=== Dance & Electronic Musician of the Year Netizen Vote ===
Year	Winner
2008	Big Bang

=== R&B & Soul Musician of the Year Netizen Vote ===
Year	Winner
2008	Brown Eyed Soul

=== Jazz & Crossover Musician of the Year Netizen Vote ===
Year	Winner
2008	Na Yoon-sun

== Special awards ==
=== Committee Choice Special Award ===
Year	Winner
2025	Live Club Day
2024	Hakchon Theatre
2022	Han Kyung-rok / Korea Jazz Guard
2021	Earkey Project
2020	SEOUL Record Fair
2017	Yoon Min-seok
2016	Park Je-chun
2015	Jambinai
2014	Naver On Stage
2013	Jara Island International Jazz Festival
2012	Working People Documentary – ‘Factory of Dreams’
2011	Super Session
2010	Shim Jeong-rak
2009	Kim Doo-soo
2008	Bbang Compilation 3, ‘History of Bbang’
2007	The EBS space
2006	Yeon Young-seok
2005	Lee Ki-yong
2004	Asoto Union / Jeon Gyeong-ok

=== Achievement Award ===
Year	Winner
2025	Lee Ho-jun
2024	Kang Tae-hwan
2023	Love & Peace
2022	Devils
2021	Deulgukhwa
2020	Kim Soo-chul
2019	Yang Hee-eun
2018	Lee Jang-hee
2017	Kim Hong-tak
2016	Kim Hwee-gab
2015	Song Chang-sik
2014	Park Sung-yeon
2013	Kim Min-ki
2012	Lee Pan-geun
2011	Son Suk-woo
2010	Cho Dong-jin
2009	Sanulrim
2008	Shin Jung-hyeon
2007	Jung Tae-chun
2006	Cho Yong-pil
2005	Han Dae-soo
2004	Lee Jung-sun

== Records ==
=== Most awarded overall ===
This list includes artists who won awards in any category, including the discontinued "netizen vote" awards.

Awards	Artist
7	BTS
7	Kiha & The Faces
6	Aespa
6	IU
6	NewJeans
6	Silica Gel
5	Hyukoh
5	Jung Jae-il
5	Kim Sa-wol
5	Na Yoon-sun
5	Younha
4	250
4	Baek Yerin
4	Garion
4	Jambinai
4	Jay Park
4	Lee Juck
4	Second Moon

=== Most grand prizes ===
This list includes artists who won the most grand prize awards, which are Musician of the Year, Album of the Year, and Song of the Year.

Awards	Artist
5	BTS
3	Kiha & The Faces
2	Aespa
2	Lee Juck
2	Lee Tzche
2	Psy
2	Seoul Electric Band
2	250

== General references ==
- 2021 winners: Ham, Nayan (2021-02-28). "". Sports Dong-A. (in Korean). Retrieved 2021-02-28
- 2019 winners: Kim, Su-jeong (2019-02-27). "BTS, 한국대중음악상 '올해의 음악인' 수상… "상 의미 잘 안다". No Cut News. (in Korean). Retrieved 2018-02-27
- 2018 winners: Jang Jin-ri (2018-02-28). "'대중음악상' 방탄소년단, 올해의 음악인…혁오·강태구 '3관왕'". Osen. (in Korean). Retrieved 2018-02-28.
- 2017 winners: Park, Su-jeong (2017-02-28). "'한국대중음악상' 박재범·볼빨간·조동진, 올해를 빛낸 음악인(종합)". The Korea Herald (in Korean). Retrieved 2018-02-25.
- 2016 winners: Jeong Yu-jin (2016-02-29). "빅뱅3관왕·이센스2관왕·혁오2관왕(종합) [13th 한국대중음악상]". Osen (in Korean). Retrieved 2018-02-25.
- 2015 winners: Kwon, Seok-jeong (2015-02-27). "10현장, 한국대중음악상이 증명한 것들". Ten Asia (in Korean). Retrieved 2018-02-25.
- 2014 winners: Yang Eun-ha (2014-02-28). "윤영배, 제11회 한국대중음악상 음반상 3관왕(종합)". News1 Korea (in Korean). Retrieved 2018-02-25.
- 2013 winners: Seo Jeong-min (2013-02-28). "버터플라이·싸이 ‘화려한 귀환’…인디·비주류 음악 대중속으로". The Hankyoreh (in Korean). Retrieved 2018-02-25.
- 2012 winners: Seo Jeong-min (2012-02-29). "장기하와 얼굴들 4관왕 ‘뭘 그렇게 놀래?’". The Hankyoreh (in Korean). Retrieved 2018-02-25.
