= Delispice =

South Korean rock band

Delispice 델리스파이스
- Genres: Alternative rock; Indie rock
- Years active: 1995–present
- Labels: Music Design; Fresh; Moonrise; Music Valley
- Members: Kim Min-kyu; Jun Jun-ho; Seo Sang-joon
- Past members: O In-rok; Choi Jae-hyeok; Lee Seung-gi; Lee Yo-han; Yang Yong-joon

Delispice (Korean: 델리스파이스), sometimes rendered as Deli Spice, is a South Korean rock band.

== History ==
The band formed in the 1990s in the Hongdae Club area, which was at that time a popular area for punk rock and indie rock bands. The group members met on a rock appreciation chatroom in Hitel, an early Internet communication platform. Kim Min-kyu, the group's guitarist and lead vocalist, wanted to form a band influenced by Anglophone rock groups like U2 and REM.

The band's debut album, Delispice, was released in 1997; its title song (i.e., its lead single) was "Mask", but after the song "Chau Chau" was used in the 2002 film Who Are U?, it became the album's most publicly visible song, and one of Delispice's best-known tracks. Their second album followed in 1999, by which time the group had undergone several line-up changes. This album includes a cover of a song by the group Sanulrim.

A third album was released in 2000 (whose title translates in English to Sad but True), with darker lyrical themes; four songs from this album were banned from rotation by a Korean broadcasting agency. A fourth album, Drrr..., followed in 2001, and a fifth, Espresso, in early 2003. Espresso featured the single "Confession", which was included on in the television drama Reply 1997 and became one of the band's most successful songs.

The band released further albums in 2006 and 2011. The 2011 release, Open Your Eyes, was issued in a Japanese special edition which included a live version of "Chau Chau", and the group toured Japan following its release. In 2014, they released a three-song EP called Time Machine, with two of the songs issued in 5.1 surround sound.

Lead vocalist and guitarist Kim Min-kyu released four solo albums as Sweet Pea before retiring the stage name in 2017. He has also started his own independent record label, Moonrise, and produces the albums it releases.

== Legacy ==
The first album, Deli Spice was placed in 18th rank for 'Top 100 Albums of Korean Pop Music'. This list was made by newspaper The Hankyoreh and Korean online music company Melon, and commented it as 'An indie masterpiece that shaped basis of the Korean modern rock'.

== Members ==
Current

- Kim Min-kyu (guitar, lead vocals)
- Jun Jun-ho (bass guitar, vocals)
- Seo Sang-joon (drums; guest member)

Former

- O In-rok (drums) - After the 1st album, he left
- Choi Jae-hyeok (drums) - After the 6th album, he left
- Lee Seung-gi (keyboard) - During the recording of the 2nd album, he left
- Lee Yo-han (keyboard)
- Yang Yong-joon (keyboard) - After the 3rd album, he left

== Discography ==
=== Studio albums ===
Title	Album details	Peak chart positions	Sales
Title	Album details	KOR	Sales
Deli Spice	Released: August 8, 1997; Label: Music Design; Format: CD, cassette	No data	No data
Welcome To The Delihouse	Released: March 3, 1999; Label: Music Design; Format: CD, cassette	—	—N/a
Sad But True... (슬프지만 진실…)	Released: February 11, 2000; Label: Music Design; Format: CD, cassette	33	KOR: 11,560+
DRRRR!	Released: September 1, 2001; Label: Fresh Entertainment; Format: CD, cassette	—	—N/a
Espresso	Released: February 1, 2003; Label: Fresh Entertainment; Format: CD, cassette	14	KOR: 39,138+
bombom	Released: February 13, 2006; Label: Moonrise; Format: CD	17	KOR: 9,476+
Open Your Eyes	Released: September 29, 2011; Label: Mirrorball Music; Format: CD, digital download	—	—N/a
"—" denotes release did not chart.

=== Extended plays ===
Title	EP details	Peak chart positions
Title	EP details	KOR
Contact (聯 (연))	Released: August 23, 2012; Label: Mirrorball Music; Format: CD, digital download	—
Time Machine (타임머신)	Released: March 21, 2014; Label: Mirrorball Music; Format: CD, digital download	42
"—" denotes release did not chart.
