= List of South Korean musicians =

This is a list of musical artists that are of South Korean nationality. They may not necessarily be of full Korean ancestry, sing in Korean language, or reside in South Korea.

== 0-9 ==
- 015B
- 100%
- 10cm
- 14U
- 15&
- 1Punch
- 1Team
- 1the9
- 1TYM
- 2000 Won
- 24Hours
- 24K+
- 250
- 2AM
- 2BiC
- 2Eyes
- 2NB
- 2NE1
- 2PM
- 2YOON
- 3rd Line Butterfly
- 3YE
- 4L
- 4Men
- 4Minute
- 4Ten
- 5tion
- 5urprise
- 5Zic
- 8Eight
- 8Turn

== A ==
- A Train To Autumn
- AA
- AB6IX
- A.C.E
- Achime
- A.cian
- Acid Angel from Asia
- Adora
- Adoy
- Aespa
- After School
- Ahn Byeong-woong
- Ahn Eak-tai
- Ahn Jae-wook
- Ahn Ye-eun
- Ailee
- Aimers
- A-Jax
- Ajoo
- AKMU
- Alex Chu
- AleXa
- Ali
- Alice
- All(H)Ours
- Almeng
- AlphaBat
- Ampers&One
- An Yu-jin
- Anda
- Andrew Choi
- Andy Lee
- AOA
- AOA Black
- AOA Cream
- Aoora
- Apeace
- Apink
- Apollo 18
- April
- A-Prince
- Arie
- Arie Band
- Argon
- Ariaz
- Arin
- Aron
- Artms
- As One
- Aseul
- Ash Island
- Asian Glow
- Astro
- ATBO
- Ateez
- Autumn Vacation
- Aziatix

== B ==
- B.D.U
- B1A4
- Baby Vox
- Baby Vox Re.V
- Babylon
- Babymonster
- Bada
- Badkiz
- Bae Cheol-soo
- Bae Ho
- Bae Jin-young
- Bae Ki-sung
- Bae Seul-ki
- Bae Suzy
- BAE173
- Baechigi
- Baek A-yeon
- Baek Ji-young
- Baek Yerin
- Badvillain
- Baekho
- Baekhyun
- Bahngbek
- Bamseom Pirates
- Bandage
- Bang Ye-dam
- Bang Yong-guk
- B.A.P
- Basick
- Bassagong
- Bastarz
- Battle
- BB Girls
- B-Bomb
- BDC
- Be.A
- Beast
- Beatwin
- Beenzino
- Bek Hyunjin
- BE'O
- Bernard Park
- Berry Good
- Bestie
- Bewhy
- B.I
- Bibi
- B.I.G
- Big Brain
- Big Mama
- Big Mama King
- Big Star
- Big Naughty
- BigBang
- Bigflo
- Bill Stax
- Billlie
- Bizniz
- Bizzy
- Black Beat
- Black Nut
- Black Pearl
- Blackpink
- Blackswan
- Blady
- Blank2y
- Blitzers
- Block B
- Bloo
- Bluedawn
- BM
- BoA
- Bob Girls
- Bobby
- Bobby Kim
- Bohemian
- Boi B
- Bolbbalgan4
- Bona
- Bongjeingan
- Boohwal
- Boom
- Bosudong Cooler
- Botopass
- B.O.Y
- Boyfriend
- BoyNextDoor
- Boys Republic
- BoyWithUke
- Boys24
- Brave Brothers
- Brian Joo
- Broccoli, You Too?
- Broken Valentine
- Brokenteeth
- Brown Eyed Girls
- Brown Eyed Soul
- Brown Eyes
- BSS
- BtoB
- BtoB 4U
- BtoB Blue
- BTS
- BugAboo
- Bulldog Mansion
- Bulssazo
- Bumkey
- Bumzu
- Bursters
- Busker Busker
- Busters
- Buzz
- Bvndit
- Bye Bye Badman
- Byul
- Byul.org

== C ==
- C Jamm
- C-Clown
- C-REAL
- Cadejo
- Can
- Candy Shop
- Car, the Garden
- CB Mass
- Celeb Five
- Cha Eun-woo
- Cha Tae-hyun
- Chaeyoung
- Chakra
- Chancellor
- Chang Ho-chirl
- Chang Kiha
- Changjo
- Changmin
- Changmo
- Changsub
- Chansung
- Chanyeol
- Cheetah
- Cheeze (band)
- Cheeze (singer)
- Chen
- Cherry Bullet
- Cherry Filter
- Cho PD
- Cho Yong-pil
- Cho Young-nam
- Chocolat
- Choi Byung-chan
- Choi Hyun-suk
- Choi Jin-young
- Choi Jung-hoon
- Choi Min-ho
- Choi Min-hwan
- Choi Ye-na
- Choi Yoo-jung
- Choi Yu-jin
- Choi Yu-ree
- Choiza
- Chun Myung-hoon
- Chungha
- Chunja
- Chuu
- Cignature
- Ciipher
- CIX
- CL
- CLASS:y
- Clazzi
- Clazziquai
- CLC
- Cleo
- Click-B
- Clon
- Clover
- CNBLUE
- CocoSori
- Code Kunst
- Co-Ed School
- Colde
- Coogie
- Cool
- Cotoba
- Crash
- Cravity
- Craxy
- Crayon Pop
- Cream
- Crezl
- Cross Gene
- Crown J
- Crucial Star
- Crush
- Crying Nut
- CSR

== D ==
- D1ce
- Dabda
- Daesung
- Dahyun
- Dal Shabet
- Dami Im
- Dana
- Danny Ahn
- Danpyunsun and the Sailors
- D.Ark
- Davichi
- Dawn
- Day6
- Daybreak
- D-Crunch
- Dean
- Decadent
- December
- Deepflow
- Defconn
- Delispice
- Deulgukhwa
- Deux
- D.Holic
- DIA (group)
- Dia (singer)
- DickPunks
- Diealright
- DinDin
- Diva
- DJ Doc
- DJ Shine
- DJ Tukutz
- DKB
- DKZ
- DMTN
- D.O.
- Do Han-se
- Doah
- Dok2
- Don Malik
- Double S 301
- Doyoung
- DPR Ian
- DPR Live
- Dreamcatcher
- DreamNote
- Drinking Boys and Girls Choir
- Drippin
- Drug Restaurant
- Drunken Tiger
- Duetto
- D-Unit
- Dvwn
- Dynamic Duo

== E ==
- E Sens
- eAeon
- Eastern Sidekick
- Eddy Kim
- Eden
- El7z Up
- E'Last
- Electron Sheep
- Elly
- Eluphant
- End These Days
- Enhypen
- ENOi
- Epex
- Epik High
- Eric Mun
- Eric Nam
- Eru
- Eun Ji-won
- Euna Kim
- Eunha
- Eunhyuk
- Eunjung
- Eve
- Even of Day
- Everglow
- Every Single Day
- EvoL
- Evnne
- EXID
- Exo
- Exo-CBX
- Exo-SC
- Exy

== F ==
- Fanatics
- Fantasy Boys
- Fat Cat
- Favorite
- F.Cuz
- Fiestar
- Fifty Fifty
- Fin.K.L
- F-iV
- Flower
- Flowsik
- Fly to the Sky
- Forestella
- Forte di Quattro
- From the Airport
- Fromis 9
- F.T. Island
- F-ve Dolls
- f(x)

== G ==
- g.o.d
- G2
- Gaeko
- Gaeul
- Gaho
- Gain
- Galaxy Express
- Gangkiz
- Garion
- Gary
- Gate Flowers
- Gavy NJ
- GD X Taeyang
- GD & TOP
- G-Dragon
- GFriend
- Geeks
- Geenius
- Genius Nochang
- Ghost9
- Giant Pink
- Gideon Gee-Bum Kim
- (G)I-dle
- Gill
- Gilme
- Giriboy
- Girl Friends
- Girl's Day
- Girlkind
- Girls' Generation
- Girls' Generation-Oh!GG
- Girls' Generation-TTS
- Giuk
- Glam
- Glen Check
- G.NA
- Global Icon
- Golden Child
- Golden Girls
- Goo Hara
- Good Day
- Goofy
- Got the Beat
- Got7
- GP Basic
- Gray
- GreatGuys
- Green Flame Boys
- GroovyRoom
- G.Soul
- Guckkasten
- Gugudan
- Gugudan SeMiNa
- Guinneissik
- Gummy
- #Gun
- GWSN
- Gyeongree

== H ==
- H1-Key
- Ha Dong Qn
- Ha Hyun-sang
- Ha Hyun-woo
- Ha Sung-woon
- Ha:tfelt
- Haepaary
- Haha
- Hahn Dae-soo
- HALO
- Han
- Han Dae-soo
- Han Sangcheol
- Han Seung-woo
- Han Seung-yeon
- Han Sun-hwa
- Han Terra
- Han Yo-han
- Hana
- Hangzoo
- Hanhae
- Hani
- Haon
- Harisu
- HarryBigButton
- Hash Swan
- HashTag
- Hathaw9y
- H&D
- HeartB
- Heechul
- Heize
- Hello Venus
- Heo Ga-yoon
- Heo Young-ji
- Heo Young-saeng
- H-Eugene
- Hi Suhyun
- High4
- Highlight
- Hinapia
- Hippy Was Gipsy
- History
- HNB
- Holland
- Hollow Jan
- Homies
- Homme
- Honey G
- Honey Popcorn
- Honeyst
- Hong Jin-young
- Hong Kyung-min
- Hoody
- Hooni Yongi
- Hoony
- Hoppipolla
- Horan
- Hoshi
- H.O.T.
- Hot Issue
- Hotshot
- Hoya
- Huh Gak
- Huh Yunjin
- Hui
- Humming Urban Stereo
- Hwang Chi-yeul
- Hwang Jung-eum
- Hwang Min-hyun
- Hwasa
- Hwayobi
- Hyeeunyee
- Hyelin
- Hyeongseop X Euiwoong
- Hynn
- Hyojung
- Hyolyn
- Hyomin
- Hyoyeon
- Hyukoh
- Hyun Bin
- Hyun Jin-young
- Hyun Young
- Hyuna
- Hyungdon and Daejun

== I ==
- iamnot
- I.B.I.
- Ibadi
- Ichillin'
- Iconiq
- Idiotape
- IITERNITI
- iKon
- I'll
- ILLIT
- Illson
- ILY:1
- I.M
- Im Chang-jung
- Im Hyun-sik
- Imfact
- Infinite
- Infinite F
- Infinite H
- Innovator
- Insooni
- I.O.I
- Irene
- Iron
- Irris
- Isak N Jiyeon
- Itzy
- IU
- Ive
- Ivy
- IZ
- Iz*One

== J ==
- J Rabbit
- Ja Mezz
- Jae
- Jaehyun
- Jambinai
- Jamie
- Jang Dae-hyeon
- Jang Deok Cheol
- Jang Dong-woo
- Jang Hyuk
- Jang Hyun-seung
- Jang Keun-suk
- Jang Minho
- Jang Myung Sun
- Jang Na-ra
- Jang Sa-ik
- Jang Wooyoung
- Jang Woo-hyuk
- Jang Won-young
- Jane Jang
- Jannabi
- Jaurim
- Jay B
- Jay Park
- Jazzyfact
- JBJ
- JBJ95
- JeA
- Jennie
- Jenny Bae
- Jeon Hye-bin
- Jeon In-kwon
- Jeon Ji-yoon
- Jeon So-mi
- Jeong Dong-won
- Jeong Se-woon
- Jeongyeon
- Jero
- Jerry.K
- Jessi
- Jessica Jung
- Jewelry
- J.Fla
- J-Hope
- Jihae
- Jihyo
- Jimin
- Jin
- Jinjin
- Jinjin & Rocky
- Jinu
- Jinusean
- Jinwoon
- Jinyoung
- Jisoo
- Jiyeon
- JJ Project
- JJCC
- JK Kim Dong Uk
- J'Kyun
- J-Min
- Jo Gwang-il
- Jo Jung-chi
- Jo Kwang-min
- Jo Kwon
- Jo Sung-mo
- Jo Woo-chan
- Jo Young-min
- Jo Yu-ri
- John Park
- Jonghyun
- Joo
- Joo Hyun-mi
- Joo Young-hoon
- Joohoney
- Jooyoung
- Jowall
- Joy
- JQT
- JR
- jtL
- Jun Hyo-seong
- Jun Jin
- Jun. K
- Jun.Q
- Jung Dong-ha
- Jung Eun-ji
- Jung Hyung-don
- Jung Il-hoon
- Jung Joon-young
- Jung Yong-hwa
- Junggigo
- Jung-in
- Jungkook
- Jungmo
- Junhyung
- Juniel
- Junoflo
- Junsu
- Jus2
- Just B
- Justhis
- Jvcki Wai
- J-Walk
- JYJ

== K ==
- K
- KARA
- KARD
- Kahi
- Kai
- Kan Mi-youn
- Kang Chan-hee
- Kang Daniel
- Kang Ji-young
- Kang Min-hyuk
- Kang Min-kyung
- Kang San-eh
- Kang Seung-yoon
- Kang Si-ra
- Kang Ye-seo
- Kangin
- Kangnam
- Kangta
- Kangta & Vanness
- Kanto
- Kasper
- Kassy
- Katie
- KCM
- Kebee
- Kei
- Keith Ape
- Kep1er
- Key
- Khundi Panda
- Kid Milli
- Kiggen
- Kiha & The Faces
- Kihyun
- Killagramz
- Kim Ah-joong
- Kim Bada
- Kim Bum-soo
- Kim C
- Kim Chang-wan
- Kim Cheon-heung
- Kim Da-hyun
- Kim Do-yeon
- Kim Dong-han
- Kim Dong-wan
- Kim Gun-mo
- Kim Heechul & Kim Jungmo
- Kim Ho-joong
- Kim Hyo-yeon
- Kim Hyun-joong
- Kim Hyun-sik
- Kim Hyung-jun
- Kim Jae-hwan
- Kim Jae-joong
- Kim Jang-hoon
- Kim Jeong-hoon
- Kim Ji-hoon
- Kim Jin-pyo
- Kim Ji-soo
- Kim Ji-woong
- Kim Jin-woo
- Kiim Jo-han
- Kim Jong-hyun
- Kim Jong-kook
- Kim Jong-seo
- Kim Jun-ho
- Kim Jung Mi
- Kim Ki-bum
- Kim Kwang-seok
- Kim Kyu-jong
- Kim Kyung-ho
- Kim Min-jong
- Kim Min-ki
- Kim Min-seok
- Kim Nam-joo
- Kim Na-young
- Kim Sa-rang
- Kim Se-hwang
- Kim Se-jeong
- Kim Se-yong
- Kim Seung-soo
- Kim So-hee (born 1917)
- Kim So-hee (born 1995)
- Kim So-hee (born 1999)
- Kim Soo-chul
- Kim Soo-hee
- Kim Soo-hyun
- Kim Sung-jae
- Kim Sung-kyu
- Kim Tae-won
- Kim Tae-woo
- Kim Wan-sun
- Kim Woo-jin
- Kim Ximya
- Kim Yeon-ji
- Kim Yeon-woo
- Kim Yo-han
- Kim Young-ho
- Kingston Rudieska
- Kino
- Kirara
- Kiss
- Kiss of Life
- Kisum
- KittiB
- K-Much
- KNK
- Koo Jun-hoe
- Koo Jun-yup
- Koreana
- Koyote
- K-Pop
- +(Kr)ystal Eyes
- Krystal Jung
- Ku Hye-sun
- Kuang Program
- K.Will
- Kwon Eun-bi
- Kwon Hyeop
- Kwon Hyun-bin
- Kwon Jin-ah
- Kwon So-hyun
- Kwon Yu-ri
- Kyuhyun

== L ==
- L
- La Poem
- Laboum
- Ladies' Code
- Lady
- Lady Jane
- Lapillus
- Laysha
- LC9
- Le Sserafim
- LEDApple
- Lee Byung-hun
- Lee Chaeyeon
- Lee Chan-hyuk
- Lee Chan-won
- Lee Dong-gun
- Lee Donghae
- Lee Eun-mi
- Lee Hi
- Lee Hong-gi
- Lee Hye-ri
- Lee Hyori
- Lee Hyun
- Lee Hyun-woo
- Lee Jae-won
- Lee Ji-hoon
- Lee Jin-hyuk
- Lee Jong-hyun
- Lee Joon-gi
- Lee Juck
- Lee Jun-young
- Lee Jung
- Lee Jung-hyun
- Lee Jun-ho
- Lee Know
- Lee Mi-ja
- Lee Min-ho
- Lee Min-hyuk
- Lee Min-woo
- Lee Moon-sae
- Lee Nan-young
- Lee Seong-jong
- Lee Seung-chul
- Lee Seung-gi
- Lee Seung-hwan
- Lee Seung-hyub
- Lee Soo-man
- Lee Soo-young
- Lee So-ra
- Lee Su-hyun
- Lee Su-jeong
- Lee Sun-hee
- Lee Tae-il
- Lee Tzsche
- Lee Young-ji
- Leellamarz
- Leeseo
- Leessang
- Leeteuk
- Legit Goons
- Lena Park
- Leo
- Lexy
- Lightsum
- Lil Boi
- Lim Jae-hyun
- Lim Jeong-hee
- Lim Jeong-hyun
- Lim Kim
- Lim Yoon Taek
- Lim Young-woong
- LimeLight
- Lip Service
- Liz
- Lizzy
- Loco
- Longguo & Shihyun
- Loona
- Loona 1/3
- Loona yyxy
- Loopy
- Loossemble
- Loptimist
- Loro's
- Louie
- Love X Stereo
- Loveholics
- Lovelyz
- LPG
- Lucid Fall
- Lucite Tokki
- Lucky J
- Lucy
- Luminous
- Lun8
- Luna
- Lunafly
- Lunarsolar
- Luv
- Lyn

== M ==
- Mad Clown
- Madmans Esprit
- Madtown
- Maeng Yu-na
- Mamamoo
- Mamamoo+
- MAP6
- Mark Lee
- Maronnier
- Masta Wu
- Max Changmin
- Maya
- MayBee
- Maywish
- MBLAQ
- MC Gree
- MC Mong
- MC Sniper
- MC the Max
- MCND
- Meaningful Stone
- Meenoi
- Melody Day
- MeloMance
- Messgram
- MFBTY
- M.I.B
- Michelle Lee
- Microdot
- Mid-Air Thief
- Mighty Mouth
- M.I.L.K
- Mimiirose
- Min Hae-kyung
- Min Hyo-rin
- Min Kyung-hoon
- Min Sun-ye
- Minah
- Mind U
- Minhwi Lee
- Minho
- Mino
- Minos
- Minzy
- Mirae
- Mirani
- Miryo
- Miss $
- Miss A
- Mithra Jin
- Miyeon
- MJ
- MOBB
- Momoland
- Monday Kiz (band)
- Monday Kiz (singer)
- Monni
- Monsta X
- M.O.N.T
- Moon Hee-jun
- Moon Tae-il
- Moonbin
- Moonbin & Sanha
- Moonbyul
- Moskva Surfing Club
- Mot
- M.Pire
- Mr.Mr
- MSG Wannabe
- M. Street
- Mudd the Student
- Mukimukimanmansu
- Mushvenom
- MustB
- MVP
- MXM
- My Aunt Mary
- MyB
- Myname
- Mystic Puzzle
- Myteen

== N ==
- Na Hoon-a
- Na Yoon-sun
- Nada
- Nafla
- Nam Hyun-joon
- Nam Ji-hyun
- Nam Jin
- Nam Tae-hyun
- Nam Woo-hyun
- Nam Yu-jin
- Namgida Band
- Narsha
- Nasty Nasty
- Nastyona
- Nature
- Naul
- Nayeon
- NC.A
- NCT
- NCT 127
- NCT DoJaeJung
- NCT Dream
- NCT U
- Nell
- Nemesis
- NeonPunch
- N.EX.T
- NewJeans
- Newkidd
- N.Flying
- Nicole Jung
- Niel
- Nine Muses
- Nine Muses A
- Nmixx
- No Brain
- No Min-woo
- No Respect for Beauty
- Noeazy
- Noel
- Noir
- Noizegarden
- NOMAD
- Norazo
- Nowz
- NRG
- NS Yoon-G
- N-Sonic
- n.SSign
- NST & The Soul Sauce
- NTB
- N-Train
- NTX
- NU'EST
- NU'EST W
- Nucksal

== O ==
- Oathean
- Odd Eye Circle
- offonoff
- Oh! Brothers
- Oh Ha-young
- OHHYUK
- Oh My Girl
- Okasian
- Old Times
- Olltii
- Omega X
- One
- One Day
- One Pact
- One Way
- Onestar
- Oneus
- Onew
- Onewe
- ONF
- Ong Seong-wu
- OnlyOneOf
- Orange Caramel
- Outsider

== P ==
- P1Harmony
- Pakk
- Paloalto
- Papaya
- Paran
- Parannoul
- Parasol
- Park Bom
- Park Bo-ram
- Park Cho-rong
- Park Gyu-ri
- Park Hyo-shin
- Park Jeong-hwa
- Park Ji-hoon
- Jisung
- Park Ji-yoon
- Park Jin-young
- Park Jung-min
- Park Kyung
- Park Myung-soo
- Park Sang-min
- Park Shin-hye
- Park So-jin
- Park Wan-kyu
- Park Woo-jin
- Park Yong-ha
- Park Yoo-chun
- Patti Kim
- Paul Kim
- Peakboy
- Peggy Gou
- Penomeco
- Pentagon
- Peppertones
- pH-1
- Phantom
- Pia
- Pink Fantasy
- Pixy
- Play the Siren
- Playback
- P.O
- P.O.P
- POW
- Pretty Brown
- Primary
- Primrose
- Pristin
- Pristin V
- Psy
- P-Type
- Punch
- Punchnello
- Pungdeng-E
- Puretty
- Purple Kiss
- Purple Rain
- Purplebeck

== Q ==
- QBS
- Qri
- QWER

== R ==
- RabidAnce
- Ra.D
- Rain
- Raina
- Rainbow
- Rainz
- Raspberry Field
- Ravi
- Red Velvet
- Red Velvet – Irene & Seulgi
- Reddy
- Redsquare
- R.ef
- Refund Sisters
- Ren
- Rescene
- RGP
- Rhythm Power
- Riize
- RM
- Rocket Punch
- Rocky
- Rocoberry
- Roh Tae-hyun
- Rolling Quartz
- Romantic Punch
- Romeo
- Rooftop Moonlight
- Roo'ra
- Rosé
- Rothy
- Rowoon
- Roy Kim
- Royal Pirates
- Rubber Duckie
- Rubber Soul
- Rumble Fish (band)
- Rumble Fish (singer)
- Running Man Brothers
- Rux
- Ryeowook
- Ryu Si-won
- Ryu Su-jeong

== S ==
- S
- Sam Kim
- Samuel
- Samuel Seo
- San
- San E
- Sanchez
- Sandara Park
- Sanha
- Sanulrim
- Saturday
- Say Sue Me
- Se So Neon
- Seaweed Mustache
- Sechs Kies
- Second Moon
- Secret
- Secret Number
- Seenroot
- SeeYa
- Sehun
- Seo Eun-kwang
- Seo In-guk
- Seo In-young
- Seo Taiji
- Seo Taiji and Boys
- Seohyun
- SeolA
- Seomoon Tak
- Seori
- S.E.S.
- Seulgi
- Seulong
- Seunghan
- Seungkwan
- Seungmin
- Seungri
- Seven
- Seven O'Clock
- Seventeen
- Sevenus
- SF9
- SG Wannabe
- Shannon
- S#arp
- Shaun
- She'z
- Shim Chang-min
- Shim Mina
- Shin Bo-ra
- Shin Hae Gyeong
- Shin Hae-chul
- Shin Hye-sung
- Shin Joong-hyun
- Shin Jung Hyun & Yup Juns
- Shin Jung-hwan
- Shin Seung-hun
- Shin Sung-woo
- Shinchireem
- Shindong
- Shinee
- Shinhwa
- Shinvi
- Shownu X Hyungwon
- Shu-I
- Sik-K
- Silica Gel
- Sim Soo-bong
- Simon Dominic
- Sinawe
- Since
- S.I.S
- Sistar
- Sistar19
- Sister's Barbershop
- Siwon
- Skarf
- Skasucks
- Skull
- Skye
- Slant
- Sleepy
- SM the Ballad
- Smacksoft
- Snuper
- So Chan-whee
- Sobangcha
- Sohee
- Sohyang
- Sokodomo
- Solar
- Solbi
- Solid
- Solji
- Son Dam-bi
- Son Na-eun
- Son Dong-woon
- Son Seung-yeon
- Sonamoo
- Song Chang-sik
- Song Dae-kwan
- Song I-han
- Song Ji-eun
- Song So-hee
- Song Yuvin
- Songgolmae
- Soohyun & Hoon
- Soojin
- Sooyoung
- Soran
- Sorea Band
- Sori
- Soumbalgwang
- South Club
- Soyeon
- Soyou
- Spectrum
- Speed
- Spica
- SS501
- SSAK3
- SSAW
- SsingSsing
- Standing Egg
- STAYC
- Stella Jang
- Stellar
- Stony Skunk
- Stray Kids
- Street Guns
- Suga
- Sugar
- Suho
- Sulli
- Sultan of the Disco
- Sung Mikyung
- Sung Si-kyung
- Sungha Jung
- Sunghoon
- Sunkyeol
- Sunmi
- Sunny
- Sunny Days
- Sunny Hill
- Sungmin
- Sunwoojunga
- Super Junior
- Super Junior-D&E
- Super Junior-H
- Super Junior-K.R.Y.
- Super Junior-L.S.S.
- Super Junior-M
- Super Junior-T
- SuperM
- Supernova
- Supreme Team
- Suran
- Sweet Sorrow
- Swervy
- Swing Girls
- Swings
- Swingz

== T ==
- Tablo
- Tae Jin-ah
- Taecyeon
- Taegoon
- Taemin
- Taeyang
- Taeyeon
- Taeyong
- Tahiti
- Tak Jae-hoon
- Take
- TAN
- T-ara
- T-ara N4
- Target
- Tasty
- Teen Teen
- Teen Top
- Teddy Park
- Tei
- Tempest
- TFN
- The Barberettes
- The Blue
- The Boss
- The Boyz
- The East Light
- The Freaks
- The Geeks
- The Grace
- The Jadu
- The Kim Sisters
- The KingDom
- The Koxx
- The Legend
- The Monotones
- The New Six
- The One
- The Quiett
- The RockTigers
- The Rose
- The SeeYa
- The Solutions
- The VANE
- Thornapple
- Thunder
- Tiffany Hwang
- Tiger JK
- Tim
- Tin Tin Five
- Tiny-G
- T-max
- TO1
- Togeworl
- Toheart
- Tomorrow X Together
- Tony Ahn
- T.O.P
- Touch
- Toy
- Trade L
- TraxX
- TRCNG
- Treasure
- Trendz
- Tri.be
- Triple H
- TripleS
- Trish Doan
- Tritops
- Trouble Maker
- Troy
- TRPP
- TST
- T.T.Ma
- Turbo
- Turtles
- Tutti
- TVXQ!
- Twice
- twlv
- Two Two
- Two X
- TWS
- Tymee
- Typhoon

== U ==
- U-BeS
- Ugly Duck
- Uhm Jung-hwa
- U-KISS
- U-Know
- U-Kwon
- Ulala Session
- UN
- UNB
- U;Nee
- Unicorn
- Unis
- Uni.T
- Uniq
- Universe Cowards
- Unnies
- Untouchable
- UP10TION
- Uptown
- Uptown 3000
- Urban Zakapa

== V ==
- V
- Vanilla Unity
- Vanner
- Varsity
- Vassline
- VAV
- Verbal Jint
- Verivery
- Vibe
- Victon
- VIINI
- Vincent & Roses
- Vinxen
- Viviz
- VIXX
- VIXX LR
- Vodka Rain
- Voisper
- V.O.S
- Vromance

== W ==
- W24
- Waker
- Walking After U
- Wanna One
- Wanted
- Wassup
- Waterfire
- wave to earth
- Wax
- We Are The Night
- We Girls
- We in the Zone
- Weeekly
- WEi
- Weki Meki
- Wendy
- Whang Bo-ryung
- ...Whatever That Means
- Wheein
- Wheesung
- Wings
- Wings of the Isang
- Wink
- Winner
- WJMK
- WJSN
- Wonder Boyz
- Wonder Girls
- Wonho
- Wonpil
- Wonstein
- Woo Jin-young
- Woo Won-jae
- woo!ah!
- Woody
- Woodz
- Wooseok
- Wooseok x Kuanlin
- Woosung
- Woozi
- WSG Wannabe
- ₩uNo

== X ==
- X1
- X-Cross
- Xdinary Heroes
- Xeno-T
- Xikers
- Xiumin
- Xodiac
- XXX
- Xlov (music group)

== Y ==
- Yang Da-il
- Yang Dong-geun
- Yang Hee-eun
- Yang Hong-won
- Yang Hyun-suk
- Yang Yo-seob
- Yangbans
- Yangpa
- YB
- Year 7 Class 1
- Yeeun
- Yeo In-hyeok
- Yeonjun
- Yeri
- Yerin
- Yesung
- Yezi
- Yim Jae-bum
- YMGA
- Yong Jun-hyung
- Yoo Ara
- Yoo Chae-yeong
- Yoo Hwe-seung
- Yoo Jae-ha
- Yoo Seon-ho
- Yoo Seung-jun
- Yoo Seung-woo
- Yoo Yeon-jung
- Yoo Young-jin
- Yooa
- Yoochun
- Yook Sung-jae
- Yoon Bok-hee
- Yoon Do-hyun
- Yoon Do Hyun Band
- Yoon Doo-joon
- Yoon Hyun-sang
- Yoon Ji-sung
- Yoon Jong-shin
- Yoon Mi-rae
- Yoon Sang
- Yoona
- You Hee-yeol
- Young Cream
- Young K
- Young Posse
- Youngjae
- Youngtak
- Younha
- Younite
- Youra
- Yubin
- Yugyeom
- Yuju
- Yuk Ji-dam
- Yumdda
- Yunhway
- Yura
- Yurisangja

== Z ==
- Zack Kim
- ZE:A
- Zelo
- Zene the Zilla
- Zeonpasa
- Zerobaseone
- Zia
- Zick Jasper
- Zico
- Zion.T
- Zior Park
- Zizo
- Zzzaam

== See also ==
- List of North Korean musicians
- Lists of musicians
- Culture of South Korea
- Traditional music of Korea
- List of individual K-pop artists
