= Kim Jung-mi =

Kim Jung-mi or Kim Jung Mi is a Korean name and may refer to:

- Kim Jung-mi (footballer)
- Kim Jung Mi (singer) (born 1953)
- Kim Jung-mi (sport shooter)
- Kim Jung-mi (writer)
