= Noeazy =

Korean metalcore band

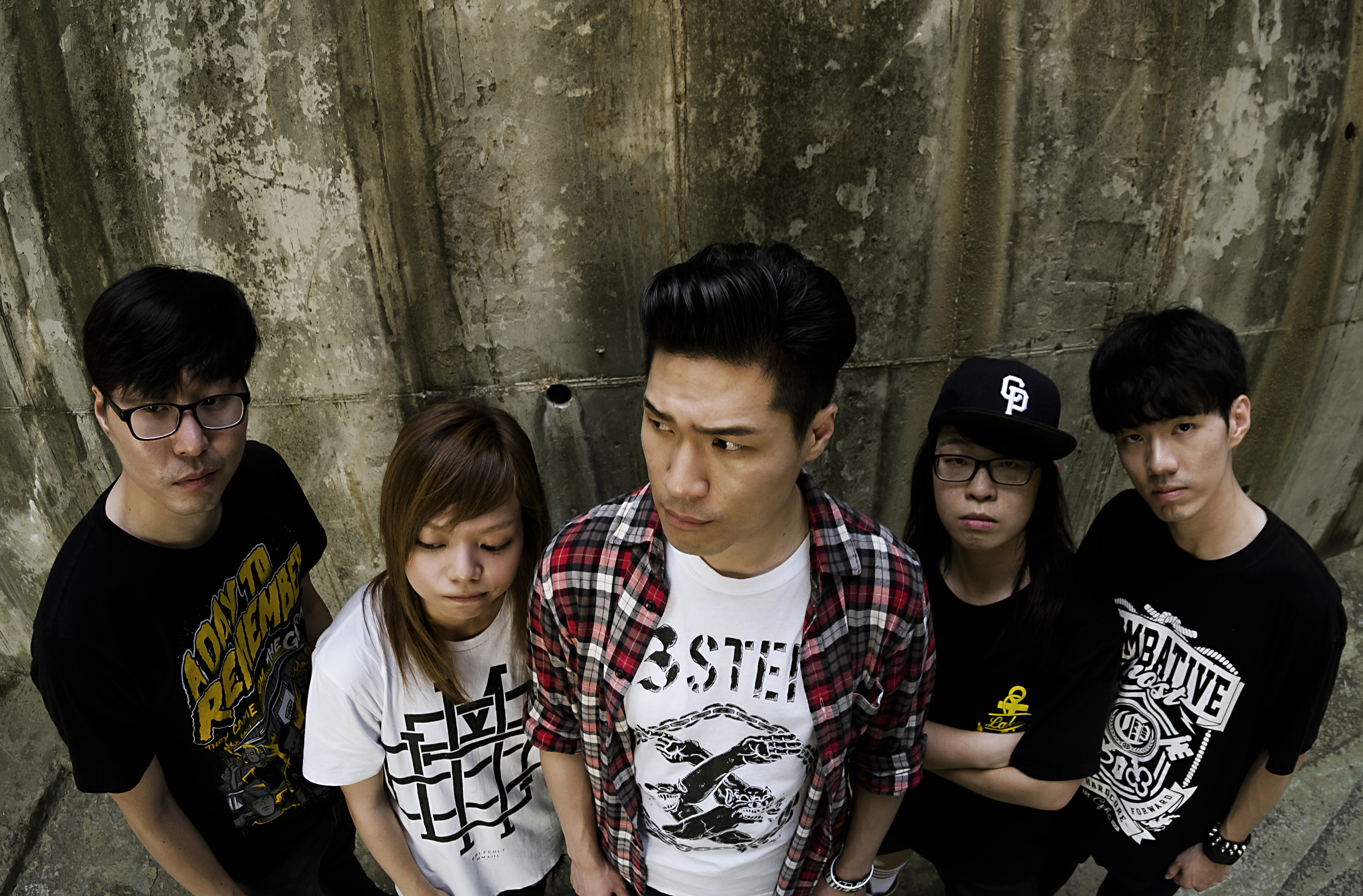
- Noeazy members

Background information
- Origin: Daejeon, South Korea
- Genres: Metalcore
- Years active: 2006–present
- Members: Gursong Yoo; Hyungki Kim; Jungjoon Park; Yuna Kang; Hayoung Cho
- Website: www.bandnoeazy.com

Noeazy (노이지) is a Korean metalcore band from Daejeon, South Korea. Formed in 2006, the band aims to spread awareness of heavy metal and rock music in South Korea.

== History ==
The band was founded as a student club by the members when they were undergraduate students at KAIST in 2006 and band activities continued even as they started their graduate studies. The name Noeazy is a combination of the word "noisy" and "not easy", stylized with a 'z' instead of an 's'.

Noeazy started off playing cover songs of popular bands before producing their own music, playing in campus festivals and a variety of indie music festivals in South Korea. In 2008, two of their songs were included in the Daejeon Indie Pride Compilations album, an album designed to showcase local talent from the Daejeon area. Noeazy released their first EP, The Mirror, later that year in December.

Their first album, Discrepancy, was released in 2010. Noeazy played in the Ssamzi Sound Festival where they received the Sumun Gosu award, which is awarded to talented up-and-coming bands. The band released a compilation album in collaboration with the Japanese band Gates of Hopeless in 2012 and followed it up with their second solo album in 2013, Land of Abomination. Music videos for the songs Genesis and Decay were created for the album's release. In 2015, Noeazy was invited to play in the 2015 Beyond the Ocean Tour in Seoul and Busan with other Korean rock and metal bands such as Messgram and End These Days. Noeazy's second EP, Bioshock, was released in December 2015.

In 2016, the band won the Korean Emergenza finals and was invited to participate in the Taubertal-Festival (de) in Rothenburg ob der Tauber, Germany as the Korean representatives. This marked their first show in Europe. They later celebrated their 10th anniversary by holding a concert in Club Sharp in Seoul.

Noeazy released their third album, Triangle, on 26 June 2018.

== Members ==
=== Current ===
- Gursong Yoo – Vocals (2006–present)
- Hyungki Kim – Guitar (2006–present)
- Yuna Kang – Drums and Band Leader (2006–present)
- Hayoung Cho – Bass (2007–present)

=== Previous ===
- Sea Kim – Guitar (2006–2007)
- Seongsan Park – Bass (2006–2007)
- Jungjoon Park – Guitar (2006–2021)

== Discography ==
=== Albums ===
- Discrepancy (2010)
- Noeazy vs Gates of Hopeless (2012)
  - Collaboration with Gates of Hopeless
- Land of Abomination (2013)
- Triangle (2018)

=== EPs ===
- The Mirror (2008)
- Bioshock (2015)

== Awards and nominations ==
- 2007: KAIST Music Festival Grand Prize
- 2010: EBS SPACE (ko) July's Hello Rookie
- 2010: Ssamzi Sound Festival Sumun Gosu
- 2016: Emergenza Korea Winners
- 2016: Emergenza Best Drummer
