= So Chan-whee =

South Korean singer

- 소찬휘
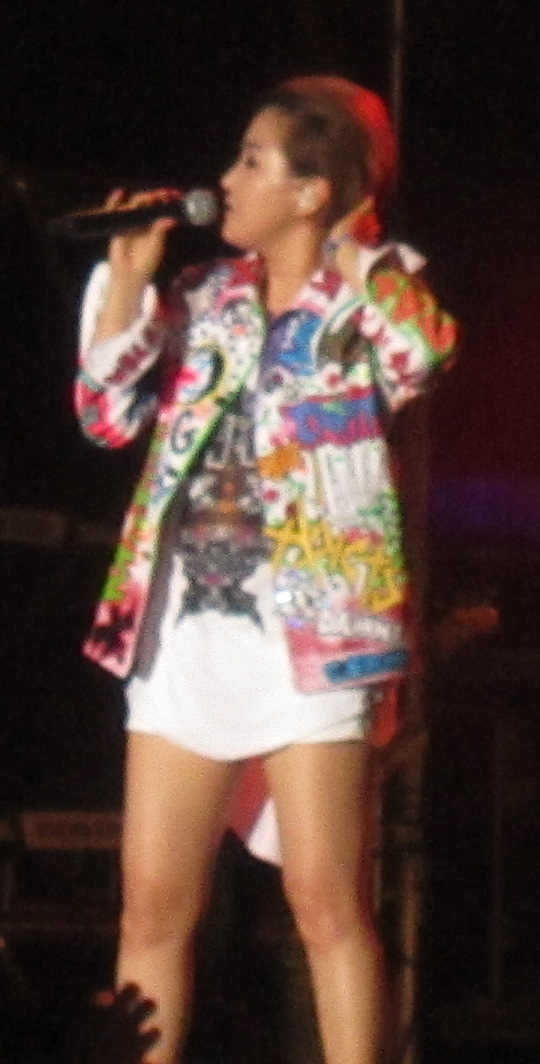
- So Chan-whee in 2015
- Born: Kim Kyoung-hee (김경희); January 20, 1972 (age 54); Myeongil, Seoul, South Korea
- Occupation: Singer
- Musical career
- Origin: South Korea
- Genres: Pop
- Occupation: Singer
- Instrument: Vocals
- Years active: 1996—present
- Label: Wide Entertainment

Korean name
- Hangul: 김경희
- RR: Gim Gyeonghui
- MR: Kim Kyŏnghŭi

Stage name
- Hangul: 소찬휘
- RR: So Chanhwi
- MR: So Ch'anhwi
- Website: chanwhee.co.kr

Kim Kyoung-hee (Korean: 김경희, born January 20, 1972), better known by her stage name So Chan-whee (Korean: 소찬휘), is a South Korean singer, best known for her 2000 song, "Tears".

== Personal life ==
Kim dated Roy of the Street Guns band (previously known as The RockTigers) in 2014. On January 1, 2017, their agency announced their upcoming marriage in the earlier half of that year. Kim and Roy were married on April 25, 2017.

== Discography ==
=== Albums ===
1. Cherish, 1996
2. Then To Now, 1997
3. Another..., 1998
4. First Bridge, March 2000
5. Red Change, 2001
6. Beginning, 2002
7. The True, 2005
8. The Begin Again, 2006

=== OSTs ===
- KBS: Thank you, Life! aka: Gracias à la vida OST, 2006
- Born To Be Free OST Witch's Court, 2017
- "Bad Girls" OST Red Shoes, 2021
