= List of Korean musicians =

List of Korean musicians may refer to:

- List of North Korean musicians
- List of South Korean musicians
