= Chunaengjeon =

Korean court dance

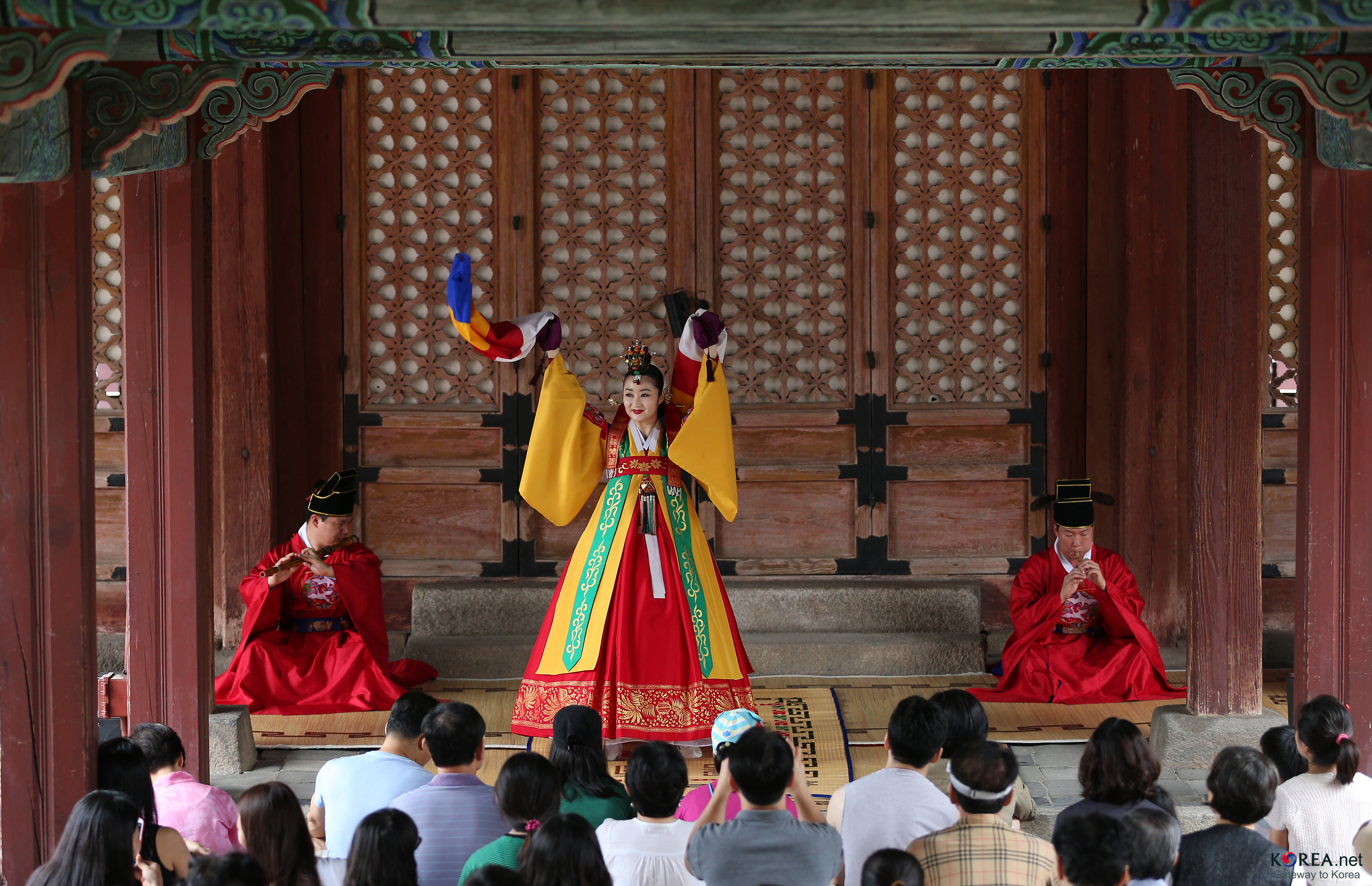
Chunaengjeon

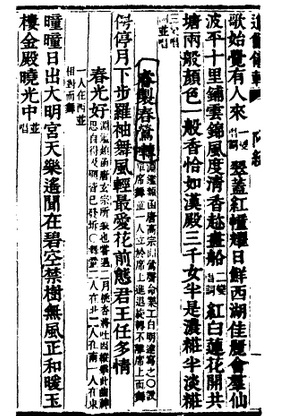
Jinchan Uigwe about Chunaengjeon

Chunaengjeon or Dance of Spring Oriole (춘앵전) is a Korean court dance (jeongjae) created during the later period of Joseon Dynasty.

== History ==
The oldest document providing brief information about Chunaengjeon is Jinchan Uigwe (Manual of Court Banquet) published in 1848. According to Jinchan Uigwe text, Chunaengjeon have existed in Joseon court since 1649, but only then under Crown Prince Hyomyeong's tutelage it was revised and perfected. The dance was presented on the 40th birthday of Queen Sunwon in 1828. Jinchan Uigwe wrote that the Korean Chunaengjeon originated from a Chinese oriole dance which was created by Tang Gaozong's court musician.

It is written :

According to Chinese encyclopedia Yuanchien Leihan of 1701, Emperor Gaozong from Tang listened to nightingale singing and ordered court musician Po Ming Chien to express it into musical composition. A mat was provided and girl dancer danced on it. Moving back and forth, and turning around, she dances only on the mat. The song text is as follows: "Walking in the moonlight, wind through sleeves, standing before a flower, yearning for a lover

The manual of 1828 did not contain dance choreography. Both 1829 and 1848's Uigwes also provided same information. The first book that contained the dance choreography was Manual of Court Dance ("Jeongjae Mudo Holgi") of 1893. It comprised the choreography of 37 Chinese and Korean dances in the form of manuscript. During Japanese occupation of Korea, court dance was banned. Therefore, only five court dances originally inherited; Cheoyongmu, Mugo, Pogurak, Geommu, and Chunaengjeon. Eventually, court dances were performed in entertainment house (gyobang).

One of the last original skill holder of Chunaengjeon was Kim Cheon-heung (1909–2007). At the age of 15 he performed Chunaengjeon in front of Emperor Sunjong. During period of Japanese occupation, he only focused on preserving traditional music. After Korean independence in 1945, he began to revive the dance in Yi Wang-jik Court Music Association.

== Characteristics ==
Chunaengjeon is the only solo Korean court dance. It shares the same basic pattern and movement with other court dances. Among Joseon court dances it is praised as "the flower of court dance".

The most important movement is hwajeontae, when the dancer imitates a bird perching on a flower by putting the colorful sleeves behind and smiling. This is a movement hard to find in other court dances and the highlight of the dance. The quality of smile decides the quality of the dancer.

The dancer dances on a floral-pattern mat (hwamunseok) with defined and controlled steps. The costume is called yellow aengsam. The headdress can be lotus coronet for a male dancer and jokduri for a female dancer. Another peculiarity is that they are not wearing shoes, only traditional socks beoseon. Court music piece pyeongjo hoesang is played to accompany the dance.

== Link ==
- (in English)Last Court Dances Kim Cheon-heung dies
