= Messgram =

- Origin: Hongdae Seoul, South Korea
- Genres: Metal; punk rock; alternative rock; Post-Hardcore
- Years active: 2011–present
- Label: IONE ENT
- Members: Ji-young Kim; Soojin Lee; Chanhyun; Yushik Shin; Nameless
- Website: messgram.com

Messgram (메스그램) is a Korean rock, post-hardcore band based in Seoul. Formed in the winter of 2011, the group was founded by Lee Soo-jin, who is a drummer in the band, with a goal of creating high quality rock and metal music in Korean indie music scene. They released their first EP, This Is A Mess But It's Us, on April 8, 2014.

== History ==
=== Formation and First EP (2011–2014) ===
Soojin Lee was seeking for members to create a new band. He, finally, formed a band named Messgram in the winter of 2011. They explained that the mess in the band name means a disordered condition and the gram means a unit that gathers the mess, in other words, people with a different style and taste gathered and formed a band, a unity that organizes a mess that each individual has created. Some members had to leave and in 2016 the band structure was finally completed: Jiyoung (clean vocal), Yushik (guitar), Chanhyun (bass), Soojin (drums), Nameless (unclean vocal and synth). The band released their debut EP, This Is A Mess But It's Us, on April 8, 2014. In early November 2014, they drew public's attention by making a remake of Seo Taiji's single Soyeokdong.

=== New Vocalist and Second EP (2015–present) ===
In 2015, vocalist YK announced that she would be leaving the band and so Messgram held a Facebook contest to search for a new vocalist. Through the contest, they found and recruited Kim Jiyoung (김지영), another female vocalist. The band's first release with Jiyoung was a Silent Scream in 2015 which was a theme song for the Korean MMORPG Arpiel. Later that year, Messgram was invited to participate in the 2015 edition of the Beyond the Ocean Tour with other Korean bands such as Noeazy and End These Days. They finished off the year with the release of another single, This Is a Mess, But It's Us.

== Musical style ==
Messgram's music have adapted to a wide variation of musical types such as early 1990s post-grunge, metal, trance and post-hardcore forging into a new genre.

== Band members ==
- Jiyoung – vocals (2015–present)
- Yushik Shin – lead guitar (2011–present)
- Chanhyun – bass (2016–present)
- Soojin Lee – drums (2011–present)
- Jahnny Shin – vocals, keyboards (2011–present)

== Past members ==
- YK – vocals (2011–2015)
- Shrek Kang – bass (2011–2016)

== Discography ==
=== Studio albums ===
- Cheers for the Failures (2020)

=== Extended plays ===
- This Is A Mess But It's Us (2014)
- Eternal Craving (2016)

=== Singles ===
- Silent Scream (2015)
- Patterns (2015)
- Blue Trace (2016)
- Toys of God (2019)

== Awards and nominations ==
- 2013: YAMAHA Asian Beat Final (3rd place)
- 2014: Samick Music school SIMS Residency Program: Unite with 2ne1 Contest (won)
- 2014: Band Diablo's Funding 21 Power Up Project Final (nominated)
- 2014: Dong-du-cheon Rock Festival Final Entries (nominated)
- 2014: Ssamzi Sound Festival Final Round (nominated)
- 2014: Redbull Live on the Road (3rd place)
- 2014: Hwacheon Trout Rock Festival (3rd place)
- 2019: 제3회 ‘ALL STAR 아티스트 페스티벌’(ALL STAR Artist Festival) organised by Seoul Pops Orchestra (1st place)
