= Swimming to Sea =

- South Korean film poster
- Directed by: Dae-Hee Lee
- Written by: Dae-Hee Lee
- Starring: Hyen-jee Kim; Young-jun Si; Young-mi Ahn; Kyeng-soo Hyen; Ho-san Lee
- Distributed by: CJ Entertainment
- Release dates: April 2012 (Jeonju Film Festival); July 25, 2012 (South Korea)
- Running time: 78 minutes
- Country: South Korea
- Language: Korean

Swimming to Sea (Korean: 파닥파닥; RR: Padakpadak) is a 2012 South Korean adult animation film written and directed by Dae-Hee Lee. It stars Hyen-jee Kim, Young-jun Si, Young-mi Ahn, Kyeng-soo Hyen and Ho-san Lee. It premiered at the 2012 Jeonju International Film Festival, and was released on July 25, 2012 to South Korean theaters. It was later distributed on Steam on June 6, 2016 as Padak by the comic book publisher eigoMANGA.

Although the film was well-received by critics in South Korea, it was met with mixed reviews elsewhere, mainly criticizing the cheap animation and screenplay.

== Plot ==
A mackerel from the ocean is placed in the fish tank of a seafood restaurant in a Korean fishing village. She is driven to escape after witnessing another mackerel being prepared as food. Her tank is co-inhabited by a group of farm fish consisting of a striped beakfish named Bream, a domi fish named Nollaemi (Ms. Snapper in English), a sleepy sea bass named Bar, a saltwater eel named Jooldom, and a youthful greenling named Spotty. They are ruled by an old flatfish, whom they refer to as "The Master," who hides underneath a grate and instructs the tank's fish to prolong their survival by playing dead when humans approach the restaurant. The fish derive sustenance from dead and dying fish that are periodically dropped into their tank. After witnessing the mackerel leap out of the tank in an unsuccessful escape attempt, the shocked farm fish christen her with the nickname "Padak" (or "Flappy"). Each night, the Master, who falsely claims to also be from the ocean, gives riddles to the farm fish loosely based on stories of the ocean told to him by a mate who had been eaten before the other fish arrived in the tank.

Following a violent confrontation between Flappy and the Master, Jooldom grants Flappy permission to provide the night's riddle. Flappy uses the opportunity to encourage the group to ponder a means of escape. Bar proposes that the king crabs in the tank below theirs are able to break the glass walls, and can be convinced to do so by Flappy, who can speak their language. The night's meeting ends with Flappy being beaten by the group after she questions the Master's authority. The next day, as the restaurant's tanks are being cleaned, Flappy and Spotty make another unsuccessful escape attempt, in which Flappy abandons her own effort when Spotty's progress is impeded by humans. That night, Flappy, in spite of her hunger and out of stubborn pride against the Master, declines to join in devouring a dying halibut, who mocks the Master's cowardice before his death. Flappy leaps into the king crab tank, where she is nearly killed until a young boy mischievously scoops her out of the tank and places her in the restaurant's aquarium. The starved Flappy devours all but one of the aquarium's clownfish before injuring herself on a knight decoration's sword and losing consciousness.

Spotty's own attempt to speak to the king crabs in their tank results in his death, and his body is placed in the farm fish's tank. As the Master suddenly defends Spotty's body from being devoured by Jooldom, Flappy is returned to the tank as well, and she attacks the Master after seeing him over Spotty's mutilated corpse, thinking he was the one who killed him. Their struggle is cut short when the Master is scooped by the restaurant chef and placed on his counter. As the chef prepares other dishes, the Master witnesses the happenings within the restaurant and fears for his life, only to be spared when the customer changes his order to mackerel. When the Master is returned to the tank, Flappy apologizes to him for her misunderstanding and encourages him to move forward before she is taken and served ikizukuri-style. The next morning, the Master makes his own leap outside the tank, and with the aid of the sword fragment that had been embedded into Flappy, he escapes the chef's clutch and successfully reaches the sea as the rest of the fishes watch from the tank.

After the credits, the Master is shown arriving at a coral reef which is filled with marine life.

== Cast ==
Hyen-jee Kim as Padak / Flappy, a spirited wild Pacific chub mackerel.

Young-jun Si as the Master, an old flatfish and the longest surviving fish of Tank.

Ho-san Lee as:

- Jooldom, an apathetic whitespotted conger eel who plays second-in-command to the Master.
- Bar, a tired sea bass who is never fully awake.

Young-mi Ahn as:

- Spotty, a young and optimistic spotty-bellied greenling fish who is the only one to truly listen to Padak.
- Nollaemi / Ms. Snapper, a sarcastic domi fish.

Kyeng-soo Hyen as Bream, a striped beakfish who enjoys nibbling off the other fish’s tails.

== Production ==
The movie was originally intended to be in 2D because the director believed they could not get the facial features right with 3D. However, it would take too long to do in 2D and he realized that 3D animation could get the desired results.

There were many completed scenes that were cut, the opening song sung by Padak in her original school and how she was caught.

Another cut song was a personal one from the Master, who would have sung while on the chopping block, cut just like the opening song for being unfitting in the narrative. The song can be seen on the channel and is available in the movie's official soundtrack, Padak Wild, produced by Yona.

There was supposed to be an additional scene after the Master escaped into the sea depicting Jooldom, Nollaemi, Bream, and Bar establishing a new cult, not unlike the one the Master once had, once a few more fishes are dropped into their tank, with riddles and other features. It was meant to further showcase the commentaries on human nature, but was cut due to time constraints.
