= Junk Drunk Love =

Studio album by Legit Goons
- Released: 31 August 2017
- Genre: Hip hop
- Length: 50:38
- Label: Self-released

Legit Goons chronology
| Camp (2016) | Junk Drunk Love (2017) | Rockstar Games (2019) |

Junk Drunk Love is the third studio album by South Korean hip hop collective Legit Goons. The album was released on 31 August 2017. The album won the 2018 Korean Hip-hop Awards Album of the Year.

== Background ==
Junk Drunk Love is an album that compares the life of an unknown musician to unhealthy junk food and hangovers. At the time of the recording, Legit Goons had to make a music video, but they didn't have enough budget, and they were later able to complete the music video with the help of Nucksal.

== Critical reception ==
Professional ratings
Review scores
| Source | Rating |
|---|---|
| Rhythmer | 4/5 stars |

Lee Jinseok of Rhythmer described the album as "While the crew's color has become darker than before, production and wrapping have unprecedented sophistication", and reviewed the album as a compilation album by the crew as a work with ideal elements. The selection committee for 2018 Korean Music Awards Kim Jeongwon praised the concept in the album's distinctive painty, slick tone and manner, and the album nominated for the Best Rap & Hip Hop Album.

== Track listing ==
| No. | Title | Length |
|---|---|---|
| 1. | "Intro" | 0:46 |
| 2. | "7-Eleven" | 3:26 |
| 3. | "Bad Thangs" | 3:40 |
| 4. | "Skit: Junk Drunk Love" | 1:07 |
| 5. | "Junk Drunk Love" | 4:30 |
| 6. | "Young Scooter" | 3:51 |
| 7. | "Trucker" | 3:53 |
| 8. | "Surf Shop" | 4:21 |
| 9. | "Very Paradise" ("너무나파라다이스") | 4:45 |
| 10. | "Highway Inn" | 3:27 |
| 11. | "Get Fresh" | 3:41 |
| 12. | "Hawaiian Wolf" | 3:27 |
| 13. | "Orange" | 4:15 |
| 14. | "Outro" | 1:50 |
| 15. | "What We Did Last Summer" ("지난 여름 우린") | 3:39 |
