= Ssamzi Sound Festival =

South Korean indie music festival

Ssamzie Sound Festival
- Genre: Rock, Indie
- Dates: Late September or early October
- Locations: Seoul, South Korea
- Years active: 1999–2014
- Founders: Ssamzi
- Website: www.ssamziesoundfestival.com

Ssamzie Sound Festival was an annual indie music festival held in South Korea from 1999-2014. The first version of the festival was held in Yonsei University, with 20 local bands performing. The festival started out as a free one-day-festival, but as the festival got more attention it grew. The "Sumun Gosu" was a gateway to success in a career for Korean indie band.

== 1999 line-up ==
23 October, Yonsei University

| Moorim Gosu | Dr. Core 911; Delispice; Loop; Uh-uh-bu Project; Wonderbird; Junky; Crying Nut; Crash; Hip Poket |
| Sumun Gosu | Naked; Nell; Riverside Black Dog; Irish; Ayln; Indian Summer; Core Magazine; Hammer |
| Special Guest | Gong Myung; Ssamzi fest Band; Honey Family |

== 2000 line-up ==
7 October, Yonsei University

| Moorim Gosu | No Brain; Dr. Core 911; Delispice; Diablo; Rainy Sun; Lazyborn; Rollercoaster; Uh-Uh-Boo Project; Yoon Do-Hyun Band; Johnny Royal; Cosmos; Cocore; MP All Star |
| Sumun Gosu | The Ring; The Ear; Sweater; Starbucks; Upper; Wish; Funny Poweder; Pia; La C |

== 2001 line-up ==
6 October, Yonsei University

| Moorim Gosu | Gong-Myung; No Brain; Lazyborn; Bulldog Mansion; Uh-Uh-Boo Project; Sister's Barbershop; Lee Sang-Eun; Crying Nut; Pia; Herbukji; Huckleberryfinn; Hwang Bo-Ryung Band |
| Sumun Gosu | Dead End; Hot Potato; Layered Sunten; Madfret; Sugardonut; Watermelon; Taboo; Freddy House |
| Mool-gunner-on Gosu | Lolita No.18; Snailramp; Young Punch |

== 2002 line-up ==
5 October, Sungkyunkwan University

| Moorim Gosu | 3rd Line Butterfly; No Brain; Lazyborn; Rollercoaster; Samchung; Sugardonut; Shin Hae-Cheol Band; Uh-Uh-Boo Project; Jaurim; Johnny Royal; Cocore; Crash |
| Sumun Gosu | Ghetto Bombs; Nastyona; Dabang; Biuret; Schizo; Uhm Project; Joly Brothers Band; Hooky Club |
| Special Gosu | Dr. Core 911; Psy |

== 2003 line-up ==
3 October, Ewha University

| Moorim Gosu | GumX; Nell; Delispice; Rock Tigers; Love Holic; Leessang; Sugardonut; Schizo; Cocore; Crash; Fortune Cookie; Pia; Han Dae-Su |
| Sumun Gosu | The Come; Rumble Fish; Slopman; Unroot; Cloud Kookoo Land; Hooligan |
| Special Gosu | Baek Ji-Young |

== 2004 line-up ==
2 October, Sungkyunkwan University

| Moorim Gosu | Ghetto Bombs; Wiretrap in My Eyes; Nastyona; Rux; Lazyborn; My Ant Mary; Vasco + Maximum Crew; Bulldog Mansion; Schizo; Sugardonut; Siderique; Sister's Baborshop; Lee Sang-Eun; Lee Seung-Hwan; In Sooni; Jaurim; Cho PD; Joosuk; Fortune Cookie; Pia; Cocore; Huckleberryfinn |
| Sumun Gosu | Repair Shop; Vanilla Unity; Haeryeong; Hollow Jan; Head Trip |
| Mool-Gunner-On Gosu | Tokyo Shock Boys; Ska Rockets; Polysics |
| Special Gosu | Kim Jin-Pyo; JK Kim Dong-Uk; Crash |

== 2005 line-up ==
2 October, Hanyang University

| Moorim Gosu | Ghetto Bombs; Kim Chang-Wan; Nell; No Brain; Delispice; Rock Tigers; Rux; Rumble Fish; Vasellin; Viva Soul; Sahon; Seoul Electronic Band; Sugardonut; Spit Fire; Uh-Uh-Boo Project; Sister's Baborshop; Oh! Brothers; Windy City; I.F; Jaurim; Jang Phil-Soon; Jeon Jae-Duk; Joosuk; Casker; Crying Nut; Pia |
| Sumun Gosu | Shadow Palace; The Soul Engine; Drive Shower; Monni; Superkids |
| Mool-Gunner-On Gosu | Cocobat |
| Special Gosu | Psy |

== 2006 line-up ==
30 September, Olympic Park

| Moorim Gosu | Kim Jang-Hoon; Nell; No Brain; Dynamic Duo; Moonshine Fairy's Grand Slam; Lazyborn; Vanilla Unity; Biuret; Sugardonut; Schizo; Shim Su-Bong; Epikhigh; YB; Lee Sang-Eun; Lee Ji-Hyung; Cocore; Trans Fixion; Fortune Cookie; Prana; Pia; Hachi and TJ; Maximum Crew (with DJ Tactics); Morning of Oul |
| Sumun Gosu | Golden Pops; Lolos; Starbow; Cockrasher; Coolage |
| Mool-Gunner-On Gosu | Nicotine; Emeralds; Ellegarden |
| Special Gosu | Hyun Jin-Young |

== 2007 line-up ==
30 September, Hangang Nanji Park

| Moorim Gosu | Nell; No Brain; Dynamic Duo; Dr. Core 911; Drunken Tiger; MOT; Mongoos; Vasellin; Vasco & B-Boy All Mighty; VOY; Spring Summer Autumn Winter; Sugardonut; Superkids; The Strikes; Sister's Baborshop; Omega 3; Windy City; Lee Sang-Eun; Lee Seung-Hwan; Jang Sa-Ik; Crying Nut; Crash; Fortune Cookie; Pia; Hollow Jan; DJ Baram; DJ Jinu; DJ Yeonjun & RYOO |
| Sumun Gosu | Gukkasten; Ninesin; The Plastic Day; Minaeri; Hello Sea |
| Mool-Gunner-On Gosu | Yama Arashi; Nude Voice; Towa Tei; Yenn Destal from Modjo & Play Paul; Jonny Fiasco |
| Special Gosu | Bigbang |

== See also ==
- List of music festivals in South Korea
- List of indie rock festivals
