= Namgida Band =

South Korean indie folk music trio

- Origin: Jeju Island, South Korea
- Genres: Indie folk, folk, acoustic
- Years active: 2012–present
- Members: Ryu Jun-young; Jo Kyung-rae; Hong Chang-ki
- Website: Official Facebook page

Namgida Band (Korean: 남기다밴드) is a South Korean indie folk music group formed in Jeju Island in 2012. The trio is composed of Ryu Jun-young (guitar, lead vocals), Hong Chang-ki (drum, percussion), and Jo Kyung-rae (viola). the local band performs mainly in Jeju Island.

The group made its debut in 2014 with their digital single "Leaving It Behind in the Road" (Korean: 길에 남기다; RR: Gire namgida).

== Members ==
- Ryu Jun-young (류준영; born June 28, 1989) - guitar, lead vocals
- Hong Chang-ki (홍창기) - drum, percussion
- Jo Kyung-rae (조경래) - viola

== Discography ==
=== Digital singles ===
"Leaving It Behind in the Road" (2014)

"Leaving It Behind in the Road (길에 남기다)"

Single by Namgida Band
- Released: January 7, 2014
- Genre: Indie folk; folk; acoustic
- Length: 4:28
- Label: Digital Records
- Songwriter: Ryu Jun-young

Namgida Band singles chronology
"Leaving It Behind in the Road (길에 남기다)" (2014)	"Leaving You Behind" (2014)

No.	Title	Lyrics	Music	Length
1.	"Leaving It Behind in the Road" (길에 남기다; Gire namgida)	Ryu Jun-young	Ryu Jun-young	4:28
Total length:				4:28

"Leaving You Behind" (2014)

"Leaving You Behind (너를 남기다)"

Single by Namgida Band
- Released: June 27, 2014
- Genre: Indie folk; folk; acoustic
- Length: 3:44
- Label: Digital Records
- Songwriter: Ryu Jun-young

Namgida Band singles chronology
"Leaving It Behind in the Road" (2014)	"Leaving You Behind (너를 남기다)" (2014)

No.	Title	Lyrics	Music	Length
1.	"Leaving You Behind" (너를 남기다; Neoreul namgida)	Ryu Jun-young	Ryu Jun-young	3:44
Total length:				3:44
