= Colde =

South Korean singer-songwriter

- Born: Kim Hee-soo; May 10, 1994 (age 32)
- Origin: South Korea
- Genres: R&B; Hip hop
- Occupation: Singer-songwriter
- Years active: 2016–present
- Label: WAVY
- Member of: Off On Off

Korean name
- Hangul: 김희수
- RR: Gim Huisu
- MR: Kim Hŭisu

Kim Hee-soo (Korean: 김희수; born May 10, 1994), better known as Colde (Korean: 콜드), is a South Korean singer-songwriter. He debuted in 2016 as a member of the indie duo Off On Off. As a solo artist he has released the extended plays Wave (2018), Love Part 1 (2019), Idealism (2021), and Love Part 2 (2023).

Colde was part of the lineup for the Grand Mint Festival 2020 which took place from October 24-25, 2020 at Olympic Park in Seoul, South Korea.

== Discography ==
=== Extended plays ===
| Title | Album details | Peak chart positions | Sales |
| Title | Album details | KOR | Sales |
|---|---|---|---|
| Wave | Released: September 13, 2018; Label: Wavy; Formats: CD, LP, digital download | 23 | KOR: 1,035 |
| Love Part 1 | Released: May 31, 2019; Label: Wavy; Formats: CD, LP, digital download | 22 | KOR: 7,544 |
| Idealism (이상주의) | Released: January 25, 2021; Label: Wavy; Formats: CD, LP, digital download | 40 | KOR: 2,000 |
| Love Part 2 | Released: May 4, 2023; Label: Wavy; Formats: CD, digital download | 25 | KOR: 7,106 |
| Icy Baby | Released: August 14, 2026; Label: Wavy; Formats: digital download | — | |

=== Single albums ===
| Title | Album details | Peak chart positions | Notes |
| Title | Album details | KOR | Notes |
|---|---|---|---|
| Your Dog Loves You | Released: March 28, 2018; Label: Wavy; Formats: CD, digital download | 49 | —N/a |
| Poem (시) | Released: November 29, 2018; Label: Wavy; Formats: CD, digital download | 42 | —N/a |
| Control Me (마음대로) | Released: September 5, 2019; Label: Wavy; Formats: CD, digital download | 61 | KOR: 175 |
| After Love | Released: December 8, 2023; Label: Wavy; Formats: digital download | — | —N/a |

=== Singles ===
| Title | Year | Peak chart positions | Album |
| Title | Year | KOR | Album |
|---|---|---|---|
| "Your Dog Loves You" (헷갈려) (feat. Crush) | 2018 | — | Your Dog Loves You |
| "Sunflower" (헷갈려) | 2018 | — | Wave |
| "String" (선) (feat. Sunwoo Jung-a) | 2018 | — | Wave |
| "Poem" (시) | 2018 | — | Poem |
| "Loss" (상실) | 2019 | — | SM Station Season 3 |
| "WA-R-R" (와르르 ♥) | 2019 | — | Love Part 1 |
| "Scent" (향) | 2019 | — | Love Part 1 |
| "Control Me" (마음대로) | 2019 | — (Note: "Control Me" did not enter the Gaon Digital Chart, but it peaked at number 194 on the component Download Chart.) | Control Me |
| "The Museum" (미술관에서) | 2021 | — (Note: "The Museum" did not enter the Gaon Digital Chart, but it peaked at number 79 on the component Download Chart.) | Idealism |
| "A Song Nobody Knows" (아무도 모르는 노래) | 2021 | — | Idealism |
| "Light" (빛) | 2021 | — (Note: "Light" did not enter the Gaon Digital Chart, but it peaked at number 172 on the component Download Chart.) | Non-album singles |
| "I'm In Love" | 2021 | — (Note: "I'm In Love" did not enter the Gaon Digital Chart, but it peaked at number 112 on the component Download Chart.) | Non-album singles |
| "My Lips Like Warm Coffee" (내 입술 따뜻한 커피처럼) (with Chungha) | 2021 | 61 | Non-album singles |
| "When Dawn Comes Again" (또 새벽이 오면) (feat. Baekhyun) | 2021 | 113 | Love Part 2 |
| "New Vision" (with Jeon So-yeon) | 2021 | — | Non-album singles |
| "Enough" (충분해) (with Jung Yumi and APRO) | 2021 | — | Non-album singles |
| "Happy Birthday" (생일을 축하해) | 2022 | — | Non-album singles |
| "Fresh" | 2022 | — (Note: "Fresh" did not enter the Gaon Digital Chart, but it peaked at number 194 on the component Download Chart.) | Non-album singles |
| "Cat" (묘) | 2022 | — (Note: "Cat" did not enter the Circle Digital Chart, but it peaked at number 192 on the component Download Chart.) | Non-album singles |
| "Don't Ever Say Love Me" (다시는 사랑한다 말하지 마) (feat. RM) | 2023 | — (Note: "Don't Ever Say Love Me" did not enter the Circle Digital Chart, but it peaked at number 31 on the component Download Chart.) | Love Part 2 |
| "I'm Still Here" (난 아직도) | 2023 | — | Love Part 2 |
| "Heartbreak Club" (이별클럽) (feat. Lee Chan-hyuk) | 2023 | — | Love Part 2 |
| "if you love me (demo)" | 2023 | — | After Love |
| "I'm Okay" (아무렇지 않아) | 2023 | | After Love |
| "All in Motion" (feat. Yung Fazo, APRO (아프로), SKOPE) | 2025 | - | Non-album single |

=== Soundtrack appearances ===
| Title | Year | Peak chart positions | Album |
| Title | Year | KOR | Album |
|---|---|---|---|
| "Confused" (헷갈려) (with Zion.T) | 2019 | 89 | Yoo-plash (Hangout with Yoo OST) |
| "Where Love Begins" (사랑은 그곳에서) | 2020 | — | Eccentric! Chef Moon OST |
| "Treasure" (보물) | 2020 | — | Backstreet Rookie OST |
| "Its You" | 2021 | — | Blue Birthday OST |
| "Star" | 2023 | — (Note: "Star" did not enter the Circle Digital Chart, but peaked and debuted at number 70 on the Circle Download Chart.) | See You in My 19th Life OST |
| "Moonrise" | 2025 | | My Dearest Nemesis OST |
"—" denotes releases that did not chart.

=== Other charted songs ===
| Title | Year | Peak chart positions | | Album |
| Title | Year | KOR | US World | Album |
|---|---|---|---|---|
| "It Takes Time" (시간이 들겠지) (Loco feat. Colde) | 2018 | 2 | — | Non-album single |
| "So, It Ends?" (그러니까) (Heize feat. Colde) | 2019 | 32 | — | She's Fine |
| "Daum" (Heize feat. Colde) | 2019 | 69 | — | Late Autumn |
| "Rain Song" (비 오는 날 듣기 좋은 노래) (Epik High feat. Colde) | 2021 | 23 | — | Epik High Is Here |
| "Cheers" (치열) (with Code Kunst, Lee Chan-hyuk & Sogumm) (Note: "Cheers" was released in collaboration with Elle Korea.) | 2021 | — (Note: "Cheers" did not enter the Circle Digital Chart, but peaked and debuted at number 158 on the Circle Download Chart.) | — | RECONNECT |
| "Hectic" (with RM) | 2022 | — | 6 | Indigo |
"—" denotes releases that did not chart.

== Awards and nominations ==
| Year | Award | Category | Nominated work | Result | Ref. |
|---|---|---|---|---|---|
| 2019 | Korean Hip-hop Awards | Best R&B Album | Wave | Nominated | |
| 2020 | Korean Hip-hop Awards | Best R&B Track | "WA-R-R" | Nominated | |
| 2020 | Korean Music Awards | Best R&B and Soul Album | Love Part 1 | Nominated | |
| 2020 | Korean Music Awards | Best R&B and Soul Song | "WA-R-R" | Nominated | |
