= Legit Goons =

South Korean hip hop collective

- Origin: Seoul
- Genres: Hip hop
- Years active: 2014–present
- Members: Bassagong; blnk; Jayho; Jaedal; Code Kunst; iDeal; Biglightbeatz; Authentic; Yosi; Kwon Ohjoon; Cocky; Lee Donggeon; Cha Yejoon; Booroo; Haepari; Kim Ganzi
- Past members: Colson; Eumko PD; Jake; Horim

Legit Goons South Korean musical collective. They started their career in 2014 with their first studio album Change the Mood. They released their second studio album Camp in 2016.

Their 2017 third studio album Junk Drunk Love won the 2018 Korean Hip-hop Awards Album of the Year and was nominated for Best Rap Album at the 2018 Korean Music Awards.

Their music is expressed as music with B-class sentiments and is well received by critics for its unique style of music. They released their fourth album Rockstar Games in 2019 and performed with Loopy and Nafla on The EBS space.

== Discography ==
=== Studio albums ===
- Change The Mood (2014)
- Camp (2016)
- Junk Drunk Love (2017)
- Rockstar Games (2019)
- Family Sitcom (2022)
