= M.I.B (band) =

2011–2017 South Korean hip hop group

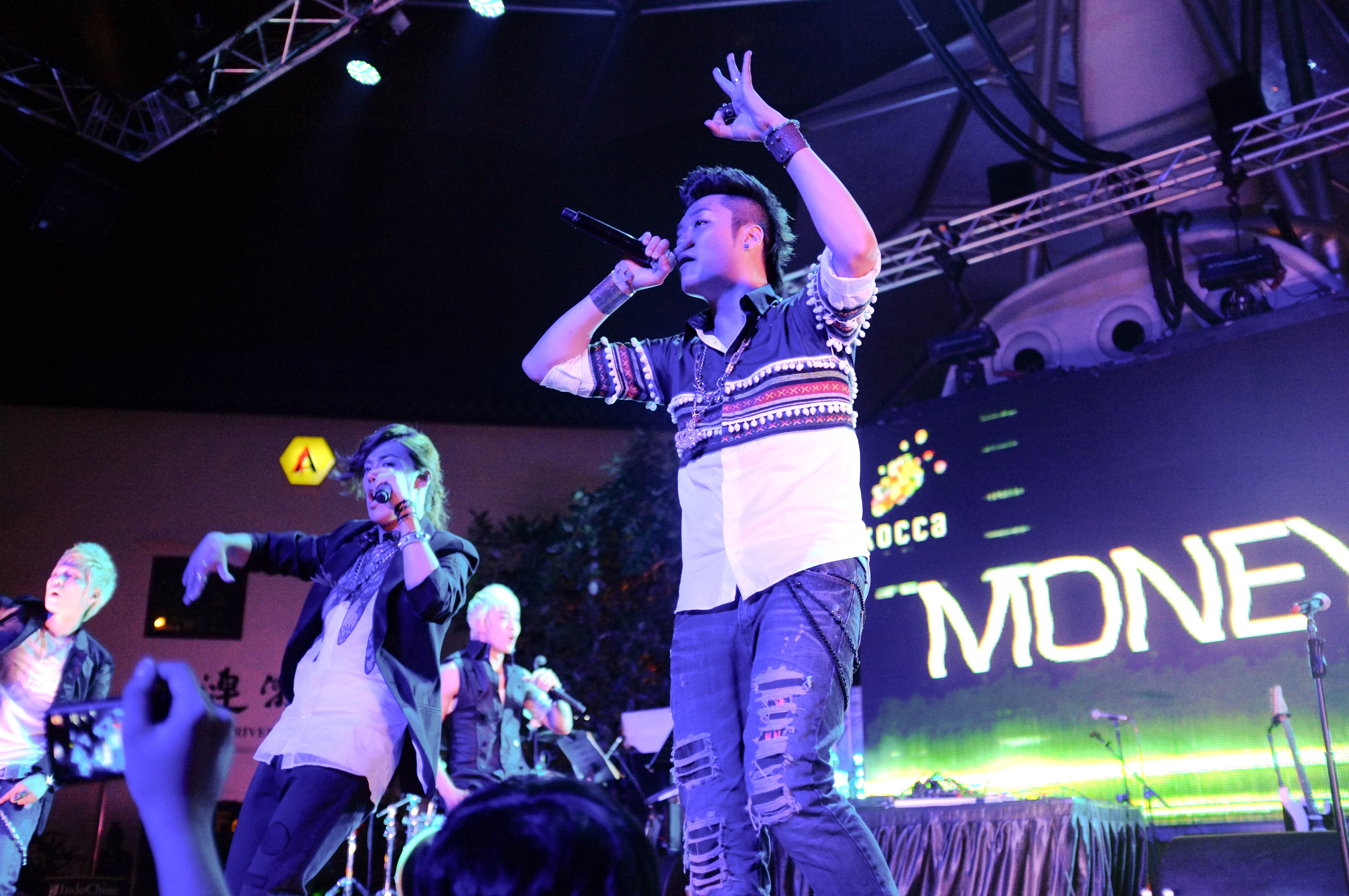
- M.I.B performing in Singapore, on July 1, 2011

Background information
- Also known as: Most Incredible Busters
- Origin: South Korea
- Genres: Hip hop; dance-pop; electropop; R&B; electronica
- Years active: 2011–2017
- Labels: Jungle Entertainment
- Past members: 5Zic; Young Cream; SIMS; KangNam
- Website: Official website

M.I.B (Korean: 엠아이비; known as Most Incredible Busters) was a South Korean hip hop quartet from Jungle Entertainment. Jungle Entertainment reported that 1.7 million USD was invested for the group's debut album since 2009. The album was personally produced and four tracks were part of a solo spin-off to show that each member can stand on their own. Their self-titled album, Most Incredible Busters, was released on October 25. They officially disbanded on January 4, 2017.

== Career ==
=== Pre-debut ===
As part of a spin-off style showcase, each member released the music video of their solo song. Starting with 5zic's "Beautiful Day" on October 6 and ending with Kang Nam's "Say My Name" on October 17. Before their debut performance on M! Countdown, they performed at the Muse Live at Music Hall to showcase their album.

=== 2011–17: Most Incredible Busters, dorm accident, Illusion, and The Maginot Line and disbandment ===
On October 26, 2011, the group made their debut on M! Countdown with the song "G.D.M." (Girls, Dreams, Money) from their self-titled album Most Incredible Busters.

In January 2012, M.I.B. performed as the opening act for the Highlight Festival 2012, in which artists such as Jay Park and Far East Movement performed. M.I.B. also opened for will.i.am at will.i.am's special club performance in Seoul the following month. The group also stated that they were working on an album to be released in March.

On April 5, 2012, a fire broke out in the band's dorm. Three stylists were killed; two were killed immediately while the other died in the hospital in critical condition after regaining consciousness. As such, their comeback activities were postponed for nearly two months until the release of their EP, Illusion on May 30.

In 2013, M.I.B. embarked on their first tour in Japan, selling out concerts in Osaka, Nagoya, and Tokyo. The group also announced that they are working on their debut Japanese album.

On March 31, 2014, M.I.B. released their second studio album, The Maginot Line. The music video for the title track, "Chisa Bounce", was released on the same day.

On January 4, 2017, Signal Entertainment announced the disbandment of the group.

== Members ==
- KangNam (Namekawa Yasuo (滑川康男))
- 5Zic (Kim Han-gil Korean: 김한길)
- Young Cream (Kim Seo-An Korean: 김서안)
- Sims (Sim Jong-su Korean: 심종수)

== Discography ==
=== Albums ===
==== Studio albums ====
Title	Album details	Peak chart positions	Sales	Track listing
Title	Album details	KOR	Sales	Track listing
Korean
Most Incredible Busters	Released: October 25, 2011; Label: Jungle Entertainment; Distributor: CJ E&M; Format: CD, digital download	20	KOR: 1,278+	Track list: 1. Men Comin’; 2. 모두 다 뻔해; 3. G.D.M; 4. Complicated; 5. Beautiful Day (Feat. BEE) (5zic solo); 6. Do U Like Me (Cream solo); 7. Hands Up (SIMS solo); 8. Say My Name (KangNam solo); 9. Who Am I 10. My Way; 11. Who’s Next
The Maginot Line	Released: March 31, 2014; Label: Jungle Entertainment; Distributor: CJ E&M; Format: CD, digital download	16	KOR: 4,153+	Track list: 1. 놀고들 있네 (So Cocky); 2. 치사 Bounce (Chisa'Bounce); 3. 들이대 (Dash (Men In Black)); 4. 너부터 잘해 (Let's Talk About You) (feat. Bomi); 5. 강강수월래 (Gangkang Suwollae); 6. Dirty Sexy Money; 7. 담배를 입에 물기 전에 (Let Me Say Before I Smoke) (feat. HIME); 8. M.I.B가 나.가.신다2 (M.I.B Is Coming2) (feat. TEM); 9. Skit; 10. 낭독 (Reading)

==== Extended plays ====
Title	Album details	Peak chart positions	Sales	Track listing
Title	Album details	KOR	Sales	Track listing
Korean
Illusion	Released: May 30, 2012; Label: Jungle Entertainment; Distributor: CJ E&M; Format: CD, digital download	15	KOR: 1,665+	Track list: 1. 더치페이 (Dutch Pay) (Feat. Hafsa); 2. 나만 힘들게 (Only Hard For Me); 3. Celebrate (Feat. Tasha– 윤미래 (Yoon Mi Rae)); 4. Celebrate (Konrad OldMoney Remix) (Feat. Tasha – 윤미래 (Yoon MiRae); 5. Celebrate (Dubstep Remix) (Feat. TEM); 6. G.D.M (Konrad OldMoney Remix) (Feat. Tiger JK, Bizzy); 7. 낙화/落花 (The Falling Flower)
Money In The Building	Released: April 10, 2013; Label: Jungle Entertainment; Distributor: CJ E&M; Format: CD, digital download	14	KOR: 1,721+	Track list: 1. Money In the Building; 2. 끄덕여줘! (Nod Along!); 3. Hello Goodbye (Feat. Tasha– 윤미래 (Yoon MiRae); 4. 난장판 (Mess) (Feat. MFBTY); 5. M.I.B가 나.가.신다 (M.I.B is coming)

=== Singles ===
Title	Year	Peak chart positions		Sales (digital)	Album
Title	Year	KOR	KOR Hot 100	Sales (digital)	Album
"Beautiful Day" (5Zic solo (feat. BEE))	2011	—	—		Most Incredible Busters
"Hands Up" (SIMS solo)	2011	—	—		Most Incredible Busters
"Say My Name" (KangNam solo)	2011	155	—	KOR: 31,342+	Most Incredible Busters
"G.D.M"	2011	144	—	KOR: 42,156+	Most Incredible Busters
"Celebrate"	2012	59	69	KOR: 117,664+	Illusion
"Only Hard For Me"	2012	70	—	KOR: 83,489+	Illusion
"Nod Along!"	2013	94	90	KOR: 60,213+	Money In the Building
"Dash" ("Men In Black")	2013	56	54	KOR: 142,361+	The Maginot Line
"Let's Talk About You" (feat. Bomi of A Pink)	2013	38	93	KOR: 78,453+	The Maginot Line
"치사 Bounce" ("Chisa'Bounce")	2014	61	—	KOR: 28,646+	The Maginot Line
"—" denotes releases that did not chart or were not released in that region.
