= Zick Jasper =

South Korean rapper

- Born: Kim Han-gil; July 26, 1988 (age 38); Ilsan, South Korea
- Occupations: Rapper; beatboxer
- Musical career
- Also known as: 5Zic
- Genres: Hip hop; K-pop
- Years active: 2011–present
- Label: Jungle Entertainment
- Formerly of: M.I.B
- Website: m-i-b.co.kr

- Zick Jasper
- Hangul: 김한길
- RR: Gim Hangil
- MR: Kim Han'gil

Kim Han-gil (Korean: 김한길; born July 26, 1988) better known by his stage name Zick Jasper (직 재스퍼), formerly 5Zic, is a South Korean rapper and beatboxer. He was a former member of the hip-hop group M.I.B, where he served as a rapper and the leader of the group. He made his recording debut with the single "Beautiful Day" just before his debut with the group. He is currently signed under Jungle Entertainment.

== Biography ==
=== 1988–2016: Early life and career beginnings ===
Zick Jasper was born on July 26, 1988, in Ilsan, South Korea. He debuted as a member of M.I.B, under the label Jungle Entertainment on October 25, 2011, with the title track "G.D.M" aka "Girls, Dreams, Money." His solo debut single "Beautiful Day" was released on October 7, 2011, as part of M.I.B's individual-member promotions before the group's debut. He has already served his mandatory military enlistment, having entered the military at the age of 18, and serving from July 2007 to July 2, 2009.

He was recently featured in Lyn's new song, "Blood Type AB Woman".

Zick Jasper had been seen on Show Me the Money 5 with group member SIMS and was said to be both judged by Gray but were eliminated during preliminary round.

== Discography ==
=== Album ===
| Title | Album details | Peak chart positions | Track listing |
| Title | Album details | Gaon | Track listing |
|---|---|---|---|
| Exhibition Mixtape #1 | Released: July 28, 2015; Label: Signal Entertainment Group, Jungle Entertainment; Format: CD, digital download | 45 | Tracks: 1. "Zick Jasper"; 2. "Bilbo Baggins"; 3. "Run Muthaxxxxx" (feat. SIMS); 4. "Hungry" (feat.Wutan, Don Mills); 5. "Monster"; 6. "We Make a Heaven of Hell" (feat.Roydo); 7. "007 Bang" (feat.Qwala, Nucksal); 8. "Seoul to LA" (feat. Ed-Two & ZEE); 9. "Chillin' on My Bed" (feat. Roydo); 10. "Smokin' Blues" (feat. Nop.K) |

=== Singles ===
| Title | Year | Peak chart positions | Album |
| Title | Year | Gaon | Album |
|---|---|---|---|
| "Beautiful Day" | 2011 | — | Most Incredible Busters (M.I.B) |
| "Hyena" | 2014 | — | Non-album single |
| "Hyena II" | 2014 | — | Non-album single |
| "Chillin' on My Bed" | 2014 | — | Non-album single |
| "Primetime" | 2016 | — | Exhibition Mixtape #1 |
"—" denotes releases that did not chart or were not released in that region.

== Filmography ==
=== Television series ===
| Year | Network | Show | Role | Notes |
|---|---|---|---|---|
| 2012 | Mnet | W. Military Academy | Himself | Regular cast |
| 2013 | MBC | MBC Star Diving Show | Himself | Episode 2 |
