= Mystic Puzzle =

South Korean electronic music group

- Origin: South Korea
- Genres: Electronica, Hip-Hop
- Years active: 2008
- Label: Mirrorball Music
- Past members: Mr. Sync; Asher

Mystic Puzzle (Korean: 미스틱 퍼즐) was a South Korean project group consisting of Mr. Sync and Asher. They debuted with the album Mystic Puzzle Land on January 16, 2008.

== Discography ==
=== Studio albums ===
Title	Album details	Peak chart positions	Sales
Title	Album details	KOR	Sales
Mystic Puzzle Land	Release date: January 16, 2008; Format: CD; Label: Mirrorball Music; Track listing: 1. Souvenir (Intro); 2. Love Train; 3. A Fairy Tale (Feat. Epik High); 4. 그런 얘기... (Feat. Gary of Leessang); 5. Newness (Feat. Addsp2ch, 넋업샨 of Infinite Flow, DJ QnA); 6. 소년의 꿈 7. 그 때, 그 날처럼; 8. 숨 (Interlude); 9. Mystic Puzzle (Feat. TBNY); 10. 달이 지다.; 11. Confession (Feat. Jiae); 12. Ready for Flight (Flight Voyage Intro); 13. Flight Voyage; 14. Enigmatic Life (Feat. MYK); 15. Reaching for the Dream (Outro)	27	KOR: 1,432
