= DJ Tactics =

DJ Tactics (Dmitry Vinokurov)
- Born: Dmitry Vinokurov; Moscow, Russia
- Genres: Hip hop; Electronic
- Occupations: record producer; DJ; event organiser; creative director
- Instruments: Synthesizers; drum machines; Pro Tools; Samplers; Turntables
- Years active: 1999–present
- Website: www.djtactics.ru

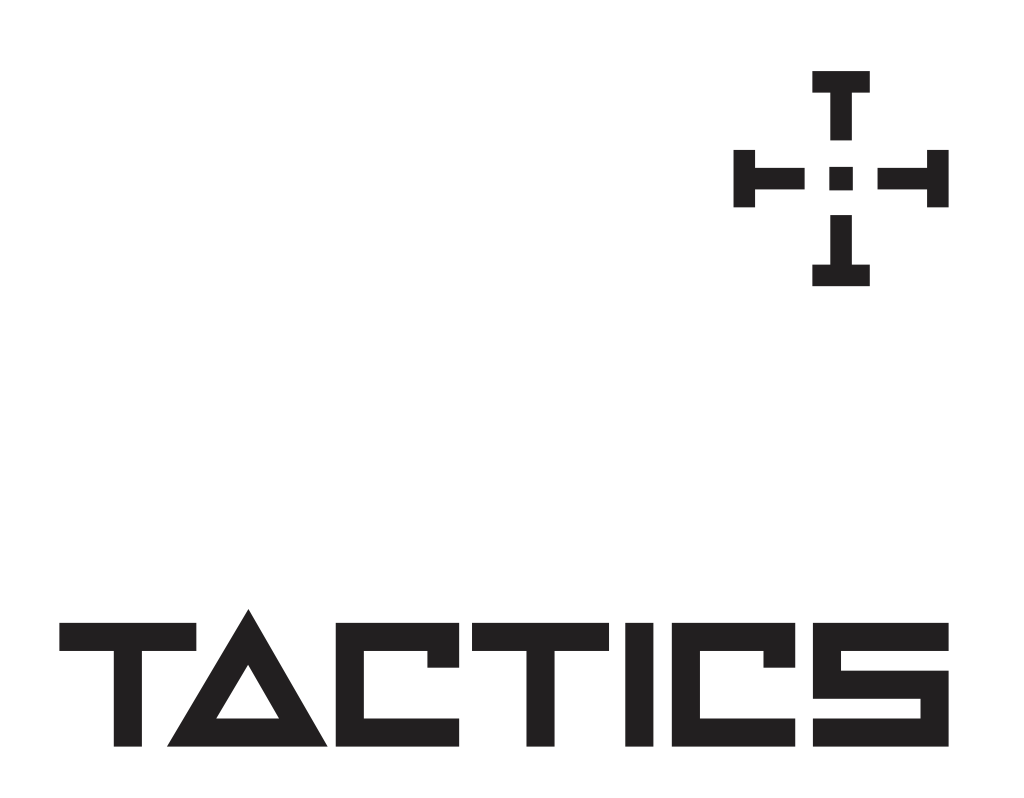
DJ Tactics logo

Dmitry Vinokurov, also known as DJ Tactics — DJ, sound producer, and cultural figure from Russia, Moscow. His career has started in the late 1998 as a DJ and sound producer. His scene name comes from the parallel to the ways of using different tactics in approaching particular styles and genres, it sends a message of diversity that can be applied to mixing, recording and scratching. His style is described by Rolling Stone magazine as “Addicted to phat beats and making the crowd head nod over the beats”. His main styles are Hip-Hop, Electronic, Funk/Soul and Turntablism.

== Career ==
In 2001 at the age of 14 he began experimenting with scratching (turntablism), that led into working with Vestax company that invited DJ Tactics to organise a first Vestax Extravaganza championship in Russia to send a first ever Russian champion to the World Finals. In 2002 he organised and judged Vestax Extravaganza Russian Finals that led to the world finals in London’s Fabric Club.

Established, in 2013 he co-founded Flammable Beats —a DJ- and Promo-group in Russia, specialising in hip-hop, funk, soul, reggae and electronic music genres that played a role in popularising these music genres on a Russian club scene in 2000x.

In 2020 a movie director Tatyana Chekhova filmed and released a documentary movie about the group and their impact on the Russian club scene in 2000x — Box of matches.

His music career was always followed by the extreme sports events, he performed on the most of extreme events in 2000x including snowboard, skateboard, BMX extreme sports events in Russia.

In 2007 a New York Times wrote in the article about Moscow club scene — "One way to measure the heat at a private club in Moscow is to find out whether DJ Tactics is in the house."

Flammable Beats also hosts a self-named radio show on 100.1 FM radio Silver Rain and releasing podcasts every month.

Tactics has worked with various Russian acts like; Basta, Timati, Sergei Voronov, The Cross Roadz, Guf, Ligalize, Slovetski, Slim, Krip-a-krip, Strizh, DC MC, Dunya, Jamal, and TGK.

In 2009 he started touring with Russian hip-hop group CENTR as a tour DJ doing 100 different cities allover Russia.

In 2012 he was invited to work with the Russian pop/rock legend, music composter and vocalist Grigory Leps.

In 2015 Tactics was nominated as DJ of the Year on Jägermeister Awards.

Tactics has opened shows for international acts like Wu-Tang Clan, Method Man, GZA, Ghostface Killah, Redman, the trio De La Soul, DJ Premier, Mix Master Mike, The Beat Junkies, Invisibl Skratch Piklz, Matisyahu, Janelle Monáe, Snoop Dogg, Diplo, DJ Todd Terry, Nightmares on Wax, Mad Professor and others.

In 2017 he performed as soloist in a famous Concerto for turntables piece by Gabriel Prokofiev in the House of the Unions with symphonic orchestra.

In 2012 he launched his author show on YouTube — Tactics of Sound. The show about teaching the knowledge of music production and DJing.

Show featured guests like; Afrika Bambaataa, George Clinton, DJ Zinc, Kid Koala, Invisibl Skratch Piklz, DJ Nu-mark, DJ J Rocc, DJ Jazzy Jeff, Neil McLellan.

Tactics has also worked and endorsed a number of brands like: Vestax, Digidesign, Urei, Denon, Universal Audio, Skullcandy, Ultrasone, ADAM, Serato, Pioneer DJ, DC Shoes.

In 2019 Tactics was invited by the Tele2 communications company to feature on their special projects, where people could send a voice message to their social networks inboxes and specialised bot will propose them to use one of 3 beats from DJ Tactics to put their voice messages on and send back the mixed result.

During his career he released a number of mixtapes, self-releases and featured on various releases, as well as composed soundtracks for movies and advertisements.

Pipomixes website reviewed his release Cold Blood Chillin' Vol. 2 as "This might be the best mix I've heard this year. All sorts of acapella's blended over funky breaks and other diverse tracks. Highly Recommended."

== Non music career ==
Throughout his career he organised various DJ and dance related events;

- DMC DJ World (2008 - to the present).
- ITF (International Turntablist Federation (2003 - 2005)) later IDA (International DJ Association (2014 - 2017)).
- Worked as a creative director at Rolling Stones Bar 2012 - 2015.
- Boiler Room (2019 at Krasnaya Polyana, Russia).
- Launched an educational project for kids with the Department of Culture of Moscow.
- Rewind series for DC Shoes
- G-Shock Skratch 2014 DJ competition

== TV and show appearances ==
- Appeared as a main DJ throughout the whole show on MuzTV TV channel in the show — Battle for Respect.
- Appeared as a main DJ throughout the whole show on MTV — Beats and Vibes.
- Appeared as a main DJ in Versus Battle YouTube show about lyrically battling MCs.
- Appeared as a main DJ and host throughout the whole show in — Tactics of Sound.
- Appeared in two episodes as a guest judge on the show — Voice of the Streets

== Music projects ==
- Tactics x Dazz-La (Tactics and mc Dazz-la, UK),
- Mean Barbados (Tactics and Sergei Voronov, RU),
- Lofi Rumba (avantgarde, lofi, hip-hop)

== Discography and Production ==
=== Releases by year ===
==== 2020 ====
- Ozz (single)
- Good Times Instrumentals (EP)
- Wabi Sabi (EP)
- Versus (EP)
- TeleBeats (EP)

=== Movie and Advertisement production ===
- Nevalashka

=== Featurings ===
- With Баста ft. Гуф:
  - Другая волна
  - Не все потеряно пока
  - Соответсвенно
- Crip a crip - 40 строк
- Strizh ft. Amir - Движуха

=== Mixtapes ===
- 2003 - The Mixtape
- 2004 - RapRu Special
- 2012 - Love and Happiness feat. DJ Pirumov
- 2013 - Cold Blood Chillin' Vol. 1
- 2015 - Wild Fifteen
- 2016 - Cold Blood Chillin' Vol. 2
- 2016 - Earthquake
- 2017 - Crown Jewels
- 2018 - CD is Dead
- 2018 - Love and Arrows for Esquire
- 2019 - Mercy Dem Gone
