= Vodka Rain =

Vodka Rain (보드카 레인)
- Genres: soft rock, indie
- Years active: 2007 - present
- Labels: MUSICABAL
- Members: Ahn Seung-joon (안승준); Lee Hae-wan (이해완); Joo Yoon-ha (주윤하); Seo Sang-joon (서상준)

Vodka Rain is a South Korean indie band that formed in 2005. The band signed to MUSICABAL and released their debut album The Wonder Years in 2007. The band's current members include Ahn Seung-joon, Lee Hae-wan, Joo Yoon-ha, and Seo Sang-joon.

== Band members ==
- Ahn Seung Joon - Vocals
- Lee Hae-wan - Guitar
- Joo Yoon-ha - Bass
- Seo Sang-joon - Drums

== Discography ==
=== Vodka Rain ===
- 1집 The Wonder Years (2007)
- Vodka Rain (2007)
- 2집 Flavor (2008)
- 숙취 (2009)
- 이분쉼표 (2009)
- 3집 Faint (2010)

=== Compilation albums ===
- MBC 음악여행 라라라 Live Vol.10 (2010)
- SAVe tHE AiR Green Concert (2011)
- Found Tracks Vol.5 (2011)

== Controversy ==
In 2011, Vodka Rain's "Night Time Restaurant" was banned by the Ministry of Gender Equality and Family. Vodka Rain and several other indie bands entered a class action lawsuit against the Ministry of Gender Equality and Family to return their songs to the market.
