= Noizegarden =

South Korean rock band

- Origin: Seoul, South Korea
- Genres: Grunge, alternative metal, stoner rock, sludge metal, heavy metal
- Years active: 1992–1999
- Label: Bay
- Past members: BJ Yoon; Gun Park; SM Lee; Jaemin Yum; Kyungwon Park

Noizegarden, stylized nOiZeGaRdEn, was a rock band from Hondae, Seoul, in South Korea, active in the 1990s.

== Former band members ==
- Bak Geon (Vocals) (died 2016)
- Yoon Byeong-Ju (Guitars)
- Yeom Je-Min (Bass)
- Bak Gyeong-Weon (Drums)
- Lee Sang-Moon (Bass)
- Bak Yeong-Joong (Drums)

== Discography ==
- nOiZeGaRdEn (1996)
- ...But Not Least (1999)
