= Hahn Dae-soo =

South Korean folk rock musician (born 1948)

- Born: March 12, 1948 (age 77), Busan, South Korea
- Genres: Folk rock
- Occupation: Singer-songwriter
- Instrument(s): Vocals, guitar
- Years active: 1966–present
- Labels: Shinsaekae Record

Korean name
- Hangul: 한대수
- Hanja: 韓大洙
- RR: Han Daesu
- MR: Han Taesu

Hahn Dae-soo (Korean: 한대수; born March 12, 1948) is a South Korean folk rock singer-songwriter.

== Early life ==
Han Dae-soo was born in Busan, South Korea in 1948. His grandfather was Han Yeong-gyo, a prominent theologian in South Korea, who founded Yonsei University with Horace Grant Underwood. When Hahn was 100 days old, his father Hahn Chang-suk, who was attending Seoul National University, left for Cornell University in the United States to study nuclear physics. His father disappeared while studying nuclear physics, and his mother remarried seven years later. Hahn was raised by his grandparents, and attended elementary school in Busan until he was ten. In 1958, he and his grandparents moved to New York, where he spent the next four years at PS 125 Elementary School in Harlem. He then returned to Busan for his third year of middle school and first year of high school. During this time, his grandfather continued to search for his son in the United States, and when Hahn was 17, the FBI found Hahn's father on Long Island, New York. His father had a large local printing business with an American wife and a new family, and had completely forgotten the Korean language. Hahn, who was in his first year of high school, immediately moved to the United States to live with his father. Hahn's father never told Hahn what had happened after he studied nuclear physics until the day he died. Although his father allowed Hahn to live in his home, their relationship did not improve beyond that. As a high school student, Hahn saw his father only twice a week, and he composed songs and played guitar in the attic of their Long Island home. Hahn later graduated from A.G. Berner High School. In 1966, he enrolled at the University of New Hampshire to study veterinary medicine, but dropped out after a year and left his father's home to study at the New York Institute of Photography. While living there, Hahn studied photography during the day and worked as a cook's assistant at night. Meanwhile, Hahn wrote songs and performed at open mic nights in the West Village in front of hippie audiences.

== Music career ==
In 1968, Hahn Dae-soo, who was working in the photography industry, returned to South Korea due to his mother's persuasion and in protest of the U.S. stance on the Vietnam War. In 1969, he was performing music in Korea's underground scene when he was drafted into the South Korean military. He then spent three years in the South Korean Navy as a gunner on a warship. During that time, several artists like Yang Hee-eun and Kim Min-gi covered his songs and included them on their albums. In 1974, he released his first album Long Way, which included the song "Give Me Water."

His first and second albums, Rubber Shoes (1975), though not explicitly anti-government, were enough to attract the attention of South Korea's dictatorship system. His songs "Give Me Water," "Land of Happiness," and "Song of Hope" were banned for overturning the system, and Hahn was placed on a blacklist. He then returned to New York at the persuasion of his wife, who was a fashion and visual director at the time.

In New York, he formed a post-punk rock band called Genghis Khan and performed at CBGB. Although the band never released an album, some of their recordings were later included on the 13th CD of The Box (2005). They gained some popularity through performances at CBGB and Trude Heller's but soon disbanded. Hahn continued his career as a photographer until 1989.

In 1989, the producer of his first album contacted him, and they began working on Hahn's third album, Infinity (1989). Although the album was critically acclaimed, it did not become a hit on the South Korean charts. In 1990, he released his fourth album, Loss of Memory, with jazz guitarist Jack Lee. in 1991, with pianist Lee Woo-chang and his brother Jack Lee, Hahn released his fifth album, Angels' Talkin'.

In 1997, his rock festival performance in Fukuoka, Japan, was released on CD. In 1999, he released his seventh album, Age of Reason, Age of Treason, in New York, and in 2000, he formed a band in Korea with Lee Woo-chang and Kim Do-kyun to release Eternal Sorrow. He later released albums such as Source of Trouble (2002) and The Hurt (2004). In July 2021, he performed at the Lincoln Center in New York under the title "You Are Here." In 2024, he released his 15th album, Blue Skies White Clouds.

== Personal life ==
Seventeen years later, Hahn's father was found in New York by the FBI after his disappearance. Over time, he recognized his former family but could not remember the Korean language. At the time of his discovery, Hahn's father was married to an Italian-American woman with nine children and was running a large printing business, though people around him did not understand how he had come to start the business.

In 1969, Hahn married Kim Myeong-shin, a fashion and visual director, but they divorced 20 years later. In 1992, while searching for an apartment in Brooklyn, Hahn met Oxana, a Russian-American 22 years his junior who worked in New York's financial sector. They married immediately, and in 2007, they had a daughter. The couple briefly settled in Seoul, but returned to New York after their daughter struggled to adjust to the South Korean public education system. Oxana battled alcohol dependence throughout her life and died in 2024.

== Discography ==
As	Year	Album title
Hahn Dae-soo	1974	멀고 먼-길 (Long Long Road)
Hahn Dae-soo	1975	고무신 (Rubber Shoes)
Hahn Dae-soo	1989	무한대 (Infinity)
Hahn Dae-soo with Jack Lee Band	1990	기억상실 (Loss of Memory)
Hahn Dae-soo with Lee Woo-chang	1991	천사들의 담화 (Angel's Talkin')
Hahn Dae-soo	1999	이성의 시대, 반역의 시대 (Age of Reason, Age of Treason)
Hahn Dae-soo	1999	1975 고무신~1997 후쿠오카 (1975 Rubber Shoes~1997 Fukuoka)
Hahn Dae-soo	2000	영원한 고독 (Eternal Sorrow)
Hahn Dae-soo	2002	고민 (Source of Trouble)
Hahn Dae-soo	2004	상처 (The Hurt)
Hahn Dae-soo	2005	2001 라이브 (2001 Live)
Hahn Dae-soo	2005	더 박스 (The Box, 13CDs + 1DVD)
Hahn Dae-soo	2006	욕망 (The Urge, 1CD + 1DVD)
Hahn Dae-soo	2006	한대수 도올 광주라이브 (Hahn Dae Soo & Doul/Kwang-ju Live, 2CDs)
Hahn Dae-soo	2007	Best of Hahn Dae Soo (2CDs)

== Bibliography ==
- 물 좀 주소 목마르요 ("Give Me Some Water, I'm Thirsty"), Gasowon, July 1998, ISBN 9788974680701
- 한대수 사는 것도 제기랄 죽는 것도 제기랄 ("Living is bullshit, dying is bullshit"), Achimiseul, July 2000, ISBN 9788988996034
- 침묵 ("Silence"), Blue Media, October 2002, ISBN 9788971751176
- 작은 평화 ("Little Peace"), Sigongsa, November 2003, ISBN 9788952734969
- 나는 행복의 나라로 갈테야 ("I will go to the land of happiness"), Achimiseul, September 2005, ISBN 9788988996522
- 올드보이 한대수 ("Old Boy Hahn Dae-soo"), Tree of Thoughts, November 2005, ISBN 9788984984998
- 뚜껑 열린 한대수 ("I Stand Alone"), Seon, November 2011, ISBN 9788963120508
- 사랑은 사랑, 인생은 인생 ("Love is love, life is life"), Book House, April 2015, ISBN 9788956059976
- 나는 매일 뉴욕 간다 ("I go to New York every day"), Book House, June 2019, ISBN 9791164050192
- 바람아 불어라 ("Ode to the wind"), Book House, March 2016, ISBN 9788956051536
- 삶이라는 고통 ("The pain of life"), Book House, October 2023, ISBN 9791164052189.
