= Zack Kim =

Korean guitarist

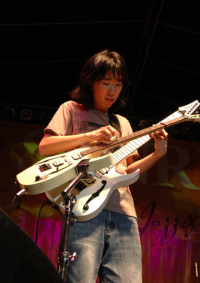

Background information
- Also known as: Zack Kim
- Born: May 5, 1983 (age 43)
- Genre: Instrumental rock
- Instruments: Guitar
- Years active: 1993–present

Zack Kim Yong Woon or Zack Kim is a Korean guitarist.

== Sources ==
- LeOuf, Nikouf: "Zack Kim and the Cosmic Funk Express", Les Cakos du Web, May 8, 2006
