= Yeo In-hyeok =

Inhyeok Yeo
- Born: 2 March 1987 (age 39)
- Origin: Seoul, South Korea
- Genre: Pop
- Occupation: Singer
- Instruments: Vocals; vocal percussion
- Years active: 2013–present
- Website: inhyeokyeo.wixsite.com/inhyeokyeo

Inhyeok Yeo (Korean: 여인혁, Japanese: よういんひょく) is an a cappella singer who is best known for singing each part of a music score using only his own voice.

== Career ==
In 2013, he started making cover versions of music videos on YouTube, including a quick succession of the covers of Michael Jackson's "Thriller", "BAD", Stevie Wonder's "I Wish", Christopher Cross's "Sailing" and Eric Clapton's "Change the World". These cover songs became hits worldwide and gained over three million views.

His current goal is to win a Grammy Award.

== Personal life ==
When he was 4th grade, he moved to Japan and lived in Kasugai, Aichi for 3 years. He returned to Korea for middle school. He graduated from Kyoto University with a degree in Economics. While he was a Kyoto University student, he joined the Kyoto a cappella circle, "CrazyClef". He is from the same a cappella circle as Kenichi Maeyamada.

== Discography ==
=== Albums ===
==== As lead artist ====
Title	Details	Certifications
One Man Acapella	Released: 27 August 2014; Formats: CD, digital download	

==== As featured artist ====
Title	Year	Album
Gentle kiss (Kei Owada featuring Inhyeok Yeo)	2014	A Part of Me
All I Care (Polyphonix featuring Inhyeok Yeo)	2015	O [Obelisk]
Air on the G String	2016	Musica Piccolyno Adventure of the Piccolyno I

=== Others ===
- Power Rangers Dino Force Brave Opening theme "Zyuden Sentai Kyoryuger Brave" (as a chorus)

== Filmography ==
=== Television ===
Year	Title	Role	Ref.
2013	Osaka Honwaka TV	Himself	
2013	Good! Morning	Himself	
2014	NexT	Himself	
2016	Unbelievable (TV series)	Himself	
2016	Information Live Miyane-Ya	Himself	
2016	Mezamashi TV	Himself	

=== Commercials ===
Year	Company	Promoting	Theme	Soundtrack	Country	Ref.
2016	Jupiter Telecommunications	Company Brand	J:COM's 5 services	J:COM Song	Japan	
