= Street Guns =

South Korean rock and roll band

Street Guns 스트릿건즈
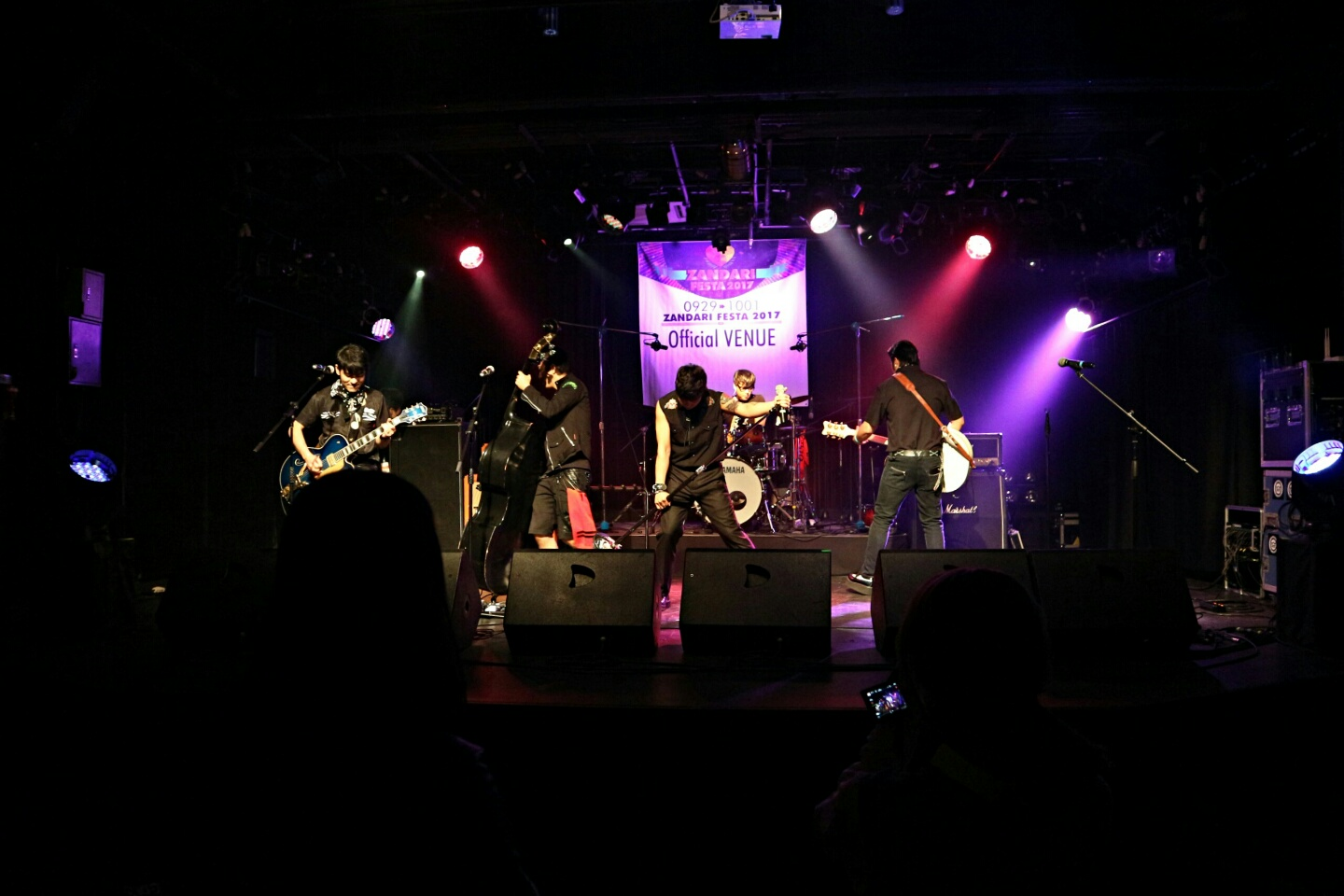
- Street Guns performing during Zandari Festa 2017

Background information
- Origin: Seoul, Korea
- Genres: Rock 'n' roll Rockabilly; Kimchibilly
- Instruments: Vocals; Guitars; Double bass Drums
- Years active: 2014–present
- Labels: Tiger Records
- Members: Tiger; Roy kyu-kyu Chul-soo
- Past members: Jeff
- Website: reverbnation.com/streetguns

Street Guns (Korean: 스트릿건즈) is a South Korean rock and roll band formed in 2014.

== Background ==
Formed in 2014, the band Street Guns consists of Tiger (박성호) and Roy (김경률) formerly from The RockTigers. They auditioned amateur vocalists and Chul-soo was chosen. They made their debut performance at the Club FF on March 1, 2014.

== Discography ==
=== Studio albums ===
- Ordinary Band (2015)
- The Second Bullet(세컨뷸렛) (2019)

== Current members ==
- Tiger – Guitar
- Roy – Double bass
- kyu-kyu – Guitar
- Chul-soo – Vocals
- In-sun 'the good boy' – Drum

== Former members ==
- Jeff – Drums
