= Uptown 3000 =

Uptown 3000 was a Korean American hip hop duo on the record label The Machine Group CEO Alvin & Calvin Waters which consisted of Carlos Galvan a.k.a. "Cali-Mexci" and Steve Kim a.k.a. "Kwon". The duo was a spinoff of Uptown, a Korean hip hop group which was active in the late 1990s whose sales reached 6 million. The duo is considered defunct as the original Uptown made its comeback in Korea in 2006, which Kim and Galvan were a part of. The group has been credited with being the first Korean hip hop group to closely resemble anything similar to American style hip hop.

== Return to Korea ==
In 2006, Kim and Galvan returned to Korea to re-form Uptown with Chris Jung. They released a new album, Testimony.

== Appearances ==
- The duo was featured in the PBS documentary film Los Angeles Now.

== Discography ==
- Same Book, Different Chapter (2003) (The Machine Group CEO Alvin & Calvin Waters)
