= Cream (rapper) =

South Korean rapper

Young Cream
- Born: Kim Gi Seok
- Genre: Hip hop
- Occupations: Rapper; record producer
- Years active: 2011–present
- Label: 769 Entertainment

Young Cream (Korean: 영크림) is a South Korean rapper and producer. He made his debut as a solo artist with the single "042" in January 2017.

== Biography ==
=== 1990–2013: Early life and career beginnings ===
Young Cream was born on February 14, 1990, in Daejeon, South Korea. He debuted as a member of M.I.B (band), under the label Jungle Entertainment on October 25, 2011, with the title track "G.D.M" a.k.a. "Girls, Drinks, Money."

=== 2017: Solo career ===
Following the disbandment of M.I.B, Cream started his solo career in January 2017 with the single "042". Later that year, he released "Better Know" featuring J-Boog on April 9.

== Discography ==
For Young Cream's work with M.I.B, see M.I.B's discography.

=== Singles ===
Title	Year	Album
"042"	2017	Non-album singles
"Better Know" (feat. J-Boog)	2017	Non-album singles
"Night" (밤이면)	2017	Non-album singles
"BANANA" (Feat. Blino)	2017	Non-album singles
"Stomp" (Feat. Los, Gento)	2017	Non-album singles

== Filmography ==
=== Television series ===
Year	Network	Show	Role	Notes
2012	Mnet	W. Military Academy	Himself	Regular cast
