= Kim Jung-mi (writer) =

South Korean writer (born 1963)

Kim Jung-mi (Korean: 김중미; born 1963) is a South Korean writer. She graduated in education from Korea National Open University. She began writing when in 2000 her story Gwaengiburimal a-ideul (괭이부리말 아이들 The Children of Gwaengiburimal) won the grand prize in the Changbi Good Children's Book Contest. She has written children's books Jongibap (종이밥 Paper Meal), Nae dongsaeng ayeongi (내 동생 아영이 My Little Sister Ayeong), Ttongbada-e gega sanda (똥바다에 게가 산다 A Crab Lives in a Sea of Poop), and young adult novels Modu kkameon (모두 깜언 Everyone Come On), Jokeowa na (조커와 나 The Joker and I), as well as picture books Yukbeongileul jikyeora ttukttak (6번길을 지켜라 뚝딱 Let's Protect Road Number 6), and Moyeora! Uranginhyeonggeukdan! (모여라! 유랑인형극단! Gather Around! The Travelling Puppet Show!). She has also written Dasi gileul tteonada (다시 길을 떠나다 Once Again On the Road), which portrays the life of Mun Jeong-hyeon.

== Life ==
Kim Jung-mi was born in Incheon. In 1987 during her 20s, she established herself in a poor neighbourhood of Manseok-dong, Dong District, Incheon with the opening of Gichatgilyeop gongbubang (기찻길옆 공부방 The Study Room by the Railroads). In 2000, she wrote Gwaengiburimal a-ideul (괭이부리말 아이들 The Children of Gwaengiburimal), which tells the stories of poor children and neighbors in Manseok-dong. The novel won the grand prize in the Changbi Good Children's Book Contest, and she became renowned as a writer. After moving to the countryside in Ganghwa in 2001, she also made a study room in Ganghwa. Now she goes between Ganghwa and Manseok-dong, meeting and helping children. As the study room's programs became expanded to include cultural arts activities, the study room's name changed to Gichatgilyeop Jageun Hakgyo (기찻길옆작은학교 The Small School by the Railroads).

== Writing ==
Kim's works come from her communal life that she had spent with children. In her major work, as well as her first book Gwaengiburimal a-ideul, Gwaengiburimal is another name for a poor neighborhood situated in Manseokdong Incheon. When she was 24, Kim went into this poor area and established herself there by setting up a study room. After 10 years of caring for poor children in Gwaengiburimal and leading a communal life, she wrote the stories of those she had met during her time there into the novel Gwaengiburimal a-ideul. By the answering the question, "there's still a place that's that poor?", Kim became a writer, and Gwaengiburimal later became the cradle of many stories that Kim wrote.

After Gwaengiburimal a-ideul, Kim has continued to write about the lives of people neglected and cast out to the dark corners of society, with a realistic, yet compassionate view. In Nae dongsaeng ayeongi (내 동생 아영이 My Little Sister Ayeong), the protagonist Ayeong is growing up in a poor family, and has Down syndrome. Modu kkameon (모두 깜언 Everyone Come On) portrays the reality of the countryside, which has been long neglected by South Korean society. In the short story collection Jokeowa na (조커와 나 The Joker and I), the titular short story talks about domestic violence and the issue of disability. In another story "Kkeumeul jikineun camera" (꿈을 지키는 카메라 The Camera That Guards Dreams), she depicts people who have lost their homes due to redevelopment. Also, in "Bulpyeonhan Jinsil" (불편한 진실 The Uncomfortable Truth) and "Naegedo nalgaega itseotda" (내게도 날개가 있었다 I Had Wings Too Once), the author looks into the issue of school violence.

As such, Kim takes interest in the lives of people situated in neglected areas of society, and portrays their lives in a realistic way. Therefore, the virtue of her works is that they're realistic, and descriptive. This is because the author writes from her background of having lived as a community with such people.

== Works ==
- Geunal, goyangiga naegero watda (그날, 고양이가 내게로 왔다 That Day, a Cat Came To Me), 2016.
- Kkoteun maneulsurok jotda (꽃은 많을수록 좋다 It's Better to Have More Flowers), 2016.
- Gyeot-e seoda (곁에 서다 Standing Beside), 2015.
- Modu kkameon (모두 깜언 Everyone Come On), 2015.
- Yukbeongileul jikyeora ttukttak (6번길을 지켜라 뚝딱 Let's Protect Road Number 6), 2014.
- Ttongbada-e gega sanda (똥바다에 게가 산다 A Crab Lives in a Sea of Poop), 2013.
- Neoyeong nayeong gureombi-eseo nolja (너영 나영 구럼비에서 놀자 Let's All Play at Gureombi), 2013.
- Jokeowa na (조커와 나 The Joker and I), 2013.
- Dasi gileul tteonada (다시 길을 떠나다 Once Again On the Road), 2011.
- Moyeora! Uranginhyeonggeukdan! (모여라! 유랑인형극단! Gather Around! The Travelling Puppet Show). 2009.
- Kkotseomgogae chingudeul (꽃섬고개 친구들 Friends From the Flower Island Hill), 2008.
- Geodaehan ppuri (거대한 뿌리 The Great Root), 2006.
- Beullusiaui gawibawibo (블루시아의 가위바위보 Blusia's Rock Paper Scissors), 2004.
- Nae dongsaeng ayeongi (내 동생 아영이 My Little Sister Ayeong), 2002.
- Gwaengiburimal a-ideul (괭이부리말 아이들 The Children of Gwaengiburimal), 2000.

=== Works in Translation ===
- 纸饭 (Chinese)
