= Bassagong =

South Korean rapper (born 1986)

Bassagong 김진우
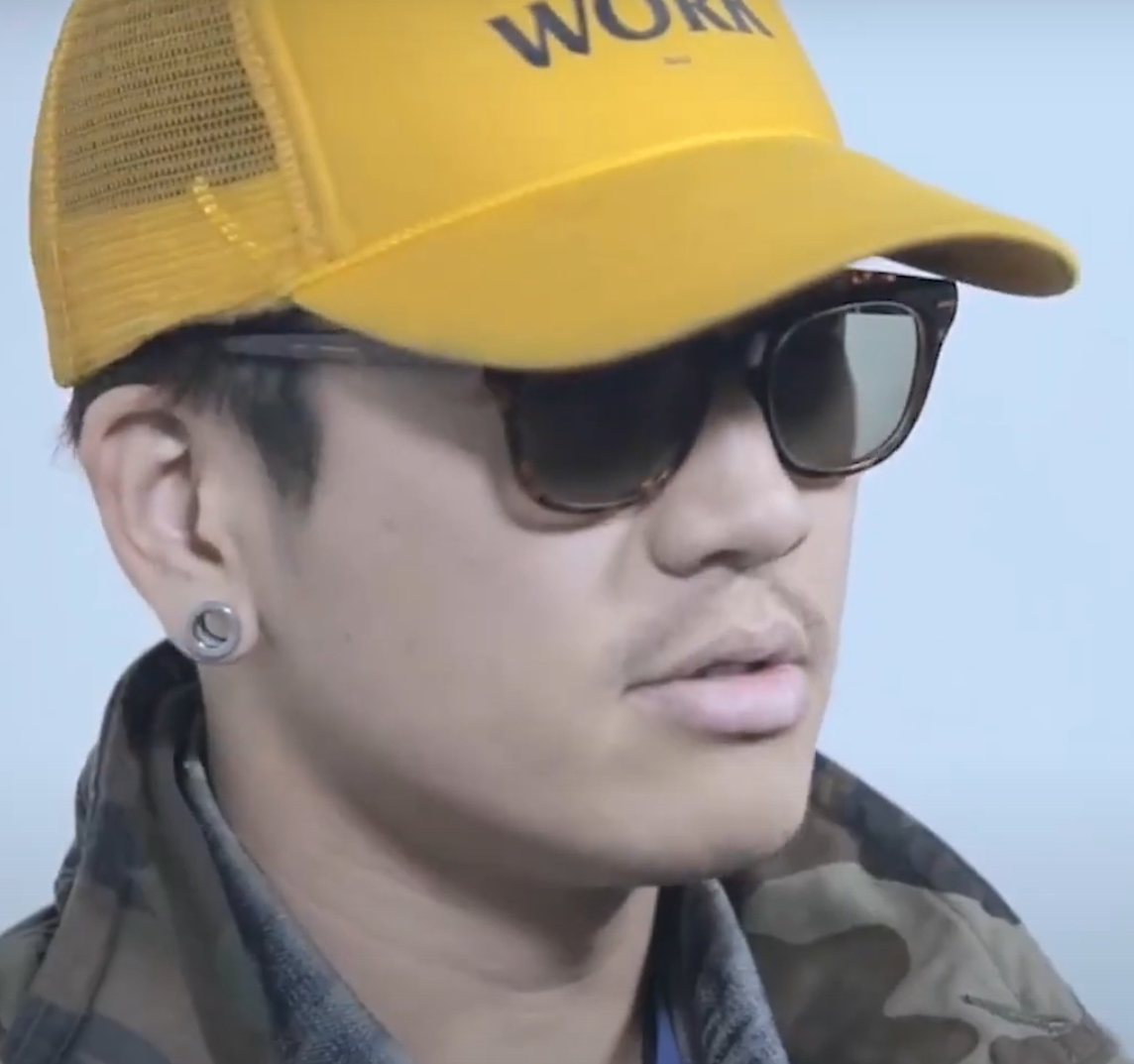
- Bassagong in 2019

Background information
- Born: September 1, 1986 (age 38); Bucheon, Gyeonggi-do, South Korea
- Genres: Hip hop
- Occupation: Rapper
- Instrument: Vocals
- Years active: 2013–present
- Member of: Legit Goons

Korean name
- Hangul: 김진우
- RR: Gim Jinu
- MR: Kim Chinu

Kim Jin-woo (Korean: 김진우; born September 1, 1986), known by his stage name Bassagong (뱃사공), is a South Korean rapper. He released his debut studio album, Chulhangsa on July 23, 2015. He is a member of the hip hop collective Legit Goons.

== Controversy ==
In 2022, rapper Don Mill's wife accused Bassagong of filming her body without her consent and sharing it to a group chat in 2018. Seoul Mapo Police Station investigated the issue and sent the case to the prosecution.

== Discography ==
=== Studio albums ===
Title	Details	Peak chart positions	Sales
Title	Details	KOR	Sales
Chulhangsa (출항사)	Released: July 23, 2015; Label: Legit Goons; Formats: CD, Digital download	—	—
Tang-A (탕아)	Released: July 18, 2018; Label: Super Jam Records; Formats: CD, Digital download	48	KOR: 500
"—" denotes releases that did not chart.

=== Extended plays ===
Title	Details	Peak chart positions	Sales
Title	Details	KOR	Sales
Giraffe (기린)	Released: January 16, 2020; Label: Super Jam Records; Formats: CD, Digital download	52	KOR: 944
"—" denotes releases that did not chart.

=== Singles ===
Title	Year	Peak chart positions	Album
Title	Year	Gaon	Album
As lead artist
"27.9"	2013	—	Non-album singles
"Gypsy"	2014	—	Non-album singles
"Chulhangsa" (출항사)	2015	—	Chulhangsa
"HBD" (축하해)	2018	—	Tang-A
"Rodeo" (로데오)	2018	—	Tang-A
"Comfort" (위로)	2019	—	Non-album singles
"Rock&Roll Baby" (락앤롤 베이비) feat. G2, Changmo	2019	—	Non-album singles
"Rainbow" (레인보우) feat. YDG	2019	—	Non-album singles
"Go First" (먼저가)	2020	—	Giraffe
Collaborations
"7" with Arwwae feat. Donutman, Chaboom	2016	—	Non-album single
"—" denotes releases that did not chart.

== Awards and nominations ==
Award ceremony	Year	Category	Nominee(s)/work(s)	Result	Ref.
Korean Music Awards	2019	Best Hip Hop Album	Tang-A	Won	
