= Off On Off =

South Korean R&B group

- Origin: Seoul, South Korea
- Genres: Contemporary R&B; electronica
- Years active: 2016–present
- Labels: HIGHGRND
- Members: Colde; 0Channel

Off On Off (Hangul: 오프온오프, stylized as offonoff) is a South Korean duo under HIGHGRND in Seoul, South Korea. They debuted on September 21, 2016, with "Bath".

== Members ==
- Colde – vocalist
- 0Channel – producer, DJ（New Stage Name – EOH）

== Discography ==
=== Studio albums ===
Title	Album details	Peak chart positions	Sales
Title	Album details	KOR	Sales
Boy.	Released: July 24, 2017; Label: HIGHGRND, KT Music; Formats: CD, digital download; Track listing: 1. in the car 2. Cigarette (feat. Tablo, MISO); 3. gold (feat. Dean); 4. Good2me (feat. PUNCHNELLO); 5. Boy; 6. Photograph; 7. Film Roll; 8. Dance (춤); 9. Midnight; 10. Moon, 12:04am 11. homeless door (feat. Rad Museum); 12. Overthinking	27	KOR: 2,196

=== Single albums ===
Title	Album details	Peak chart positions	Sales
Title	Album details	KOR	Sales
Photograph	Released: November 8, 2016; Label: HIGHGRND, KT Music; Formats: CD, digital download	88	—

=== Singles ===
Title	Year	Peak chart positions	Sales (DL)	Album
Title	Year	KOR	Sales (DL)	Album
"Bath"	2016	—	—	Non-album single
"Photograph"	2016	—	—	Boy.
"Boy"	2017	—	—	Boy.
"Dance" (춤)	2017	—	—	Boy.
"—" denotes releases that did not chart.
