= Kim Jung Mi (singer) =

South Korean singer (born 1953)

Kim Jung Mi (Korean: 김정미; born 23 April 1953) is a South Korean psychedelic rock singer.

== Life ==
Kim was born on April 23, 1953, in Seoul, as the second daughter of Kim Sun Sung, an entrepreneur who owned a transportation company. In 1971, when she was in her last year of high school, Kim joined Shin Jung-hyeon's band to record film soundtracks for The Women in the Waiting Room and Wolves and Cats. She continued her singing career as a vocalist for Shin Jung Hyun & Yup Juns, and recorded Now. However, after six years of musical success, Kim was forced to leave the scene in 1977 due to repetitive censorship criticizing her "vulgar voice". During the 1975 Marijuana Incident, Kim was arrested and all the music albums she produced were believed to have been discarded. Kim released the song "Spring" (also known as "Haenim") for her album Now in 1973, which recently gained popularity after its use as the introduction song for South Korean television drama When Life Gives You Tangerines (2025).
