= Kim Cheon-heung =

South Korean musician

Kim Cheon-heong (Korean: 김천흥; Hanja: 金千興; February 9, 1909 – August 18, 2007) was designated as the first ingan-munhwage on 21 December 1968 for the jongmyo jerye which is an Important Cultural Property of Korea. He was the master of haegeum and ilmu (일무; 佾舞), which is a kind of Korean traditional dance during jongmyo jerye.

== Biography ==
Kim was born in Seoul, Korea. When he was 13, he started studying Korean traditional dance at Joseon's royal music school (이왕직아악부 아악생 양성소) in 1922. He was called "the last boy dancer" (무동; 舞童) of the Joseon Dynasty because he performed at the last king, Sunjong of the Korean Empire's 50th birthday celebration in 1923. He also learned haegeum and other Korean traditional musical instruments including the ajaeng from the master Lee Sun-yong. He extended the Joseon Dynasty's royal dances to 40 types from an original 12 types. He died at the age of 98.

== Career ==
- 1998 Honorary Chairman of the Performing Arts, Korea
- 1992~1993 President of the Republic of Korea Academy of Arts, Theatre, Film, and Dance Division
- 1983 Leader of Important Intangible Cultural Properties of Korea Performing Arts Company
- 1978 Member of The National Academy of Arts of the Republic of Korea
- 1973 President of corporation Daeakhoe (대악회)
- 1961 Committee of Cultural Properties
- 1955 Director of Kim Cheon-heong Classical Dance Institute
- 1951 Research, Advisory Committee of the National Gugak Center
- 1940 Music instructor at Ewha Woman's College, Oxford University, Hanyang University

In 2002, he donated about 2000 resources on the traditional music of Korea, which he had gathered for 80 years, to the University of Hawaii where he had been a visiting professor.

== Awards ==
- 1997 Bangilyoung Gukaksang
- 1983 Korean Gukak
- 1970 The Republic of Korea Academy of Arts
- 1969 The Second Korea Culture Award
- 1968 Cultural Preservation Achievement Award
- 1960 Seoul City Culture Award
