= Nastyona =

South Korean indie rock band

- Origin: Busan, South Korea
- Genres: Alternative rock; Jazz rock
- Years active: 2002-present
- Members: Yona
- Past members: Lee Ho Jin (guitars), Lee Yong Jin (drums), Park Cheol Woo (bass, guitars), Yim Tae Hyeok (bass), Son Hee Nam (guitars), Do Eun Ho (bass), Yong Seung Hun (drums)

Nastyona (Korean: 네스티요나) is a South Korean indie rock band formed in Busan in 2002.

== Members ==
=== Yona ===
Frontwoman Yona (Birth name: Jang Irang) was born on March 23, 1982 (age 44) and is from South Korea. She has been the lead vocalist, keyboardist, songwriter, and lyricist since its origins in 2002 and is the only constant member of this band. She was the clue that made up the name of Yona, the role in the film Snowpiercer.

- Individual activities: She produced the songs in the 'Padak (2012 film)' as musical director and released several solo albums like 《Hello My Tiger》,《Undo Redo》,《Twinkle》.

=== Past members ===
- Lee Yong Jin (SIYA) is a drummer of the band Leenalchi and a member of the band Ondahl with his older brother Lee Ho Jin.
- Yim Tae Hyeok is active as a singer-songwriter TETE.
- Son Hee Nam is a guitarist of the band Asian Chairshot.

== Discography ==
No.	Album details	Track listing
1	《Bye Bye My Sweet Honey》 Released : April 8, 2004	1. Present; 2. Cause You're My Mom; 3. Covered; 4. Song For My Father; 5. Like this (이렇게); 6. If She Finally Comes; 7. Secret; 8. Good Night My Brother
2	《Nine Moods》 Released : April 10, 2007	1. Nine Moods (아홉가지 기분); 2. Irreversible (돌이킬 수 없는); 3. Needle (바늘); 4. A Story Perhaps Destined from the Beginning (어쩌면 처음부터 정해져 있던 이야기); 5. Empty; 6. The Night That Never Fades (사라지지 않는, 밤); 7. Tete; 8. Judith; 9. Jordan River (요단강); 10. To My Grandfather; 11. In a Dream (꿈속에서) (Feat. Jood From Vivasoul); 12. Until I Fall Asleep (잠들 때까지); 13. Hug (포옹)
3	《Another Secret》 (Note: 2009 Korean Music Awards nominations for Best Rock Album); Released : September 4, 2008	1. Another Secret; 2. Rumor (Note: 2009 Korean Music Awards nominations for Best Rock Song); 3. The Heavy Snow (폭설); 4. Struggle (티격); 5. You Are Also Like Me (너도 나처럼); 6. I Do; 7. Boy Meets Girl; 8. The Impossible Operation (불가능한 작전); 9. My September; 10. Please Stay With Me (내곁에 있어줘); 11. Cat Child (묘아) (Another Ver.); 12. Insommnia (불면증); 13. The Star, To You 17 Years Old (별, 열일곱의 너에게); 14. The Heavy Snow (폭설) (Piano Ver.)
4	《Don't Die》 Released : May 8, 2015	1. Don't Die (죽지마요)
5	《The Perfect Scar.13》 Released : December 25, 2023	1. The Perfect Scar.13 (완벽한 흉터.13); 2. The Perfect Scar.13 (완벽한 흉터.13) (piano ver.)
6	《Iguanaz.11》 Released : February 23, 2024	1. Iguanaz.11; 2. Iguanaz.11 (piano ver.)
7	《Bama.17》 Released : May 3, 2024	1. Bama.17 (밤아.17); 2. Bama.17 (밤아.17) (piano ver.)
8	《Irang.12》 Released : June 24, 2024	1. Irang.12 (이랑.12)
9	《Worst case scenario》 Released : September 13, 2024	1. Worst case scenario
10	《THEO》 Released : November 12, 2024	1. THEO
11	《PALE BLUE DOT》 Released : December 25, 2025	1. PALE BLUE DOT; 2. PALE BLUE DOT - Instrumental
12	《NIGHT.26》 Released : April 15, 2026	1. NIGHT.26; 2. NIGHT.26 - Instrumental
13	《RUMOR.26》 Released : September 11, 2026	1. RUMOR.26; 2. RUMOR.26 - Instrumental

== Filmography ==
- The EBS space (EBS, July 8, 2007)
