= End These Days =

South Korean metalcore and hardcore band

- Origin: Busan, South Korea
- Genres: Metalcore, Hardcore
- Years active: 2013 - Present
- Labels: Watch Out! Records
- Members: Yul; Yang Jin Hyun; Dogui; Jun; WooKwon
- Website: https://www.facebook.com/endthesedays/

End These Days is a metalcore and hardcore band from Busan, South Korea that was founded in 2013. They are currently associated with Watch Out! Records.

== History ==
End These Days was formed in the summer of 2013 by four South Koreans and one Australian national. The band is based in Busan and made their debut playing in local events. In order to promote the South Korean metal scene, End These Days founded the Beyond the Ocean Tour in 2014, a yearly concert showcasing South Korean metalcore and hardcore bands. Since the band's guitarist Mitch is from Australia, the yearly tour also serves as an annual celebration for the band. After the 2015 show, End These Days released their demo 10,000 Miles Beyond the Ocean for free distribution over the internet.

End These Days started gaining popularity in 2015 and participated in the Busan Rock Festival, one of South Korea's largest rock musical festivals. The band made their international debut when they were invited to perform at the School of Mosh music festival in Hanoi, Vietnam in 2016 alongside other prominent Asian bands such as King Ly Chee. Since then, End These Days has also occasionally held shows in Japan in addition to their regular shows in the major South Korea cities: Seoul, Daejeon, Daegu, Busan, and Gwangju.

After years of only releasing singles and EPs, End These Days released their first album, Ambivalence, in 2017. The album features two tracks with guest vocals from prominent bands. The first single in the album, Solace, includes guest vocals from Ryo of Crystal Lake, a popular Japanese metalcore band, and the song Misty features Ki Seok Seo from The Geeks, one of Korea's first hardcore punk bands. In February 2018 the album was nominated for the Best Metal and Hardcore Album for the 15th Korean Music Awards.

== Style ==
End These Days has stated that their music is influenced by metalcore bands such as the Architects, The Ghost Inside, and Northlane. Yul, the vocalist, typically uses a screaming style and the band frequently mixes elements from different genres of metal.

== Members ==
- Yul (Vocals)
- Yang Jin Hyun (Guitar)
- Jun (Bass)
- Dogui (Guitar)
- WooKwon (Drums)

== Discography ==
=== Albums ===
- Ambivalence (2017)

=== EPs ===
- All I Have x End These Days (2014)
- Dead End (2020)

=== Singles ===
- We Stand For You (2014)
- Echoes / Exodus (2014)
- Unbreakable / Everlasting (2016)

=== Demos ===
- 10,000 Miles Beyond the Ocean (2015)
