= The RockTigers =

South Korean rock and roll band

The RockTigers 락타이거즈
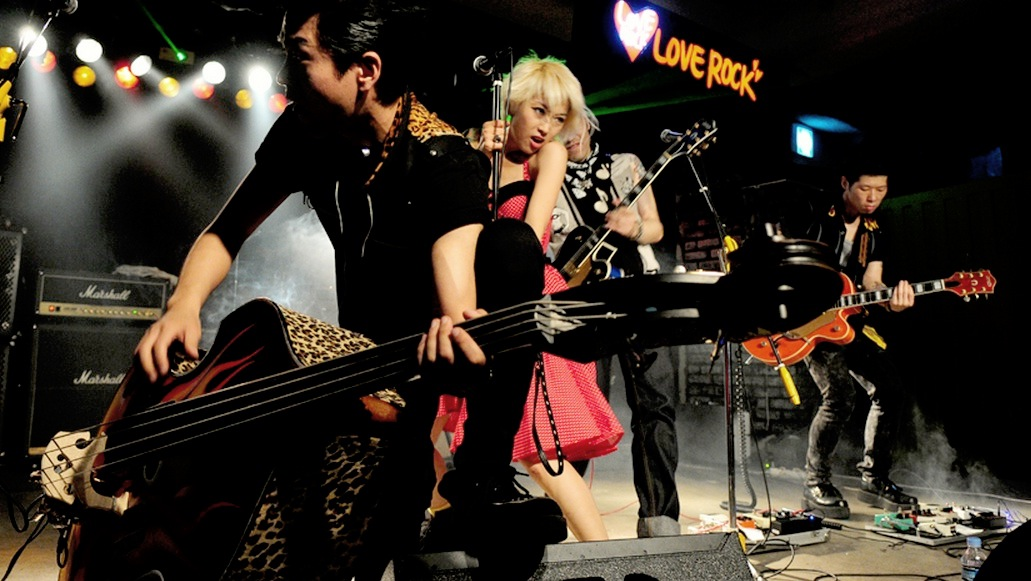
- The RockTigers in 2010

Background information
- Origin: Seoul, Korea
- Genres: Rock 'n' roll Rockabilly; Kimchibilly
- Instruments: Vocals; Guitars; Double bass
- Years active: 2001–2013
- Labels: Tiger Records
- Past members: Velvet Geena; Tiger; Roy; Eddie Tarantula
- Website: The RockTigers

The RockTigers (Korean: 락타이거즈, also written as The Rock Tigers, The Rocktigers) were a South Korean rock and roll band from 2001 to 2013. The RockTigers had a style that was rooted in the 1940s and 1950s jump blues, boogie-woogie, and rockabilly that sets them apart from other Korean indie bands.

== Background ==
They branded their style of music as "kimchibilly" to represent their Korean take on the style, referring to Korea's representative food kimchi, and for years held monthly "Kimchibilly Nights." The term was coined by a foreign fan of the band.

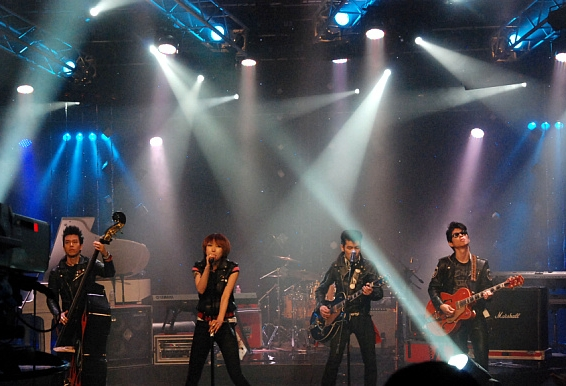
The RockTigers performing at OBS station in 2011

Although not part of the Korean mainstream, The RockTigers have developed a cult following, especially among the expat community and tourists, with their energetic live shows around the Hongdae club scene.

== Discography ==
=== Studio albums ===
- Come On Let's Go (2003)
- Oldies But Goodies (2007)
- Taste The Kimchibilly (2008)
- Rock 'N' Roll Licence (2010)
- Rockabilly Coaster (2010) (Japan only)
- Electric Travel (2011)
- Shut Up And Deal (2013)

=== Compilations ===
- 문화사기단 합동음반 제1호/Culture Fraud Company Compilation No. 1 (2002) "Sex Machine"
- 문화사기단 크리스마스 컴필레이션/Culture Fraud Company Christmas Compilation (2002) "Leather Bike Jacket Boy"

== Members ==
Velvet Geena - Vocals
Tiger - Guitar
Roy - Double bass
Eddie Tarantula - Guitar
