= 2012 Melon Music Awards =

2012 South Korean music award ceremony

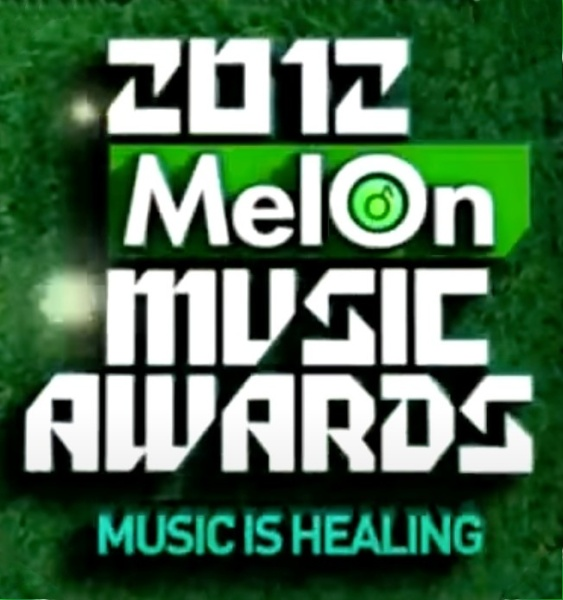
- Date: Friday, December 14, 2012
- Location: Olympic Gymnastics Arena
- Country: South Korea

Highlights
- Most awards: Psy (4)
- Most nominations: Psy (5)
- Song of the Year: "Gangnam Style"
- Album of the Year: Busker Busker 1st Album
- Artist of the Year: Beast
- Website: Melon Music Awards website

Television/radio coverage
- Network: JTBC2; JTBC4; 1theK; KakaoTV; Daum; Melon

The 2012 Melon Music Awards were held on Friday, December 14, 2012, at the Olympic Gymnastics Arena in Seoul, South Korea. Organized by Kakao M through its online music store Melon, the 2012 ceremony was the event's fourth edition since its offline launch in 2009. The award winners were determined by combining digital sales data and voting conducted by netizens online.

The 2012 ceremony was the show's largest ceremony at the time, attracting an audience of over 11,000 people. It was directed under the theme of "Music is Healing" and was broadcast live globally via YouTube as well as cable television channels domestically.

Psy was the most nominated and awarded act of the night, where he won four awards including Song of the Year with "Gangnam Style", Global Artist, Top 10 Artist and Best Music Video. Beast and Busker Busker were awarded with Artist of the Year and Album of the Year, respectively. B.A.P and Ailee additionally won the Best New Artist Awards.

== Performers ==
List of performances at 2012 Melon Music Awards
| Artist(s) | Song(s) |
|---|---|
| Rhythm Power; Simon Dominic; Dynamic Duo | "Sanaee" "Cheerz" "Friday Night" |
| K.Will; Hoya; Dongwoo | "Please Don't..." |
| B.A.P | "Warrior" |
| T-ara | "Sexy Love" "Lovey-Dovey" |
| Infinite | "The Chaser" |
| Sistar | "Alone" |
| Nell | "White Night" "Cliff Parade" |
| Ailee; Huh Gak | "Heaven" "A Someone Who Loves Me" "You Raise Me Up" |
| 2NE1 | "I Love You" |
| Beast | "It's Not Me" "Beautiful Night" |

== Winners and nominees ==
=== Main awards ===
Winners and nominees are listed below. Winners are listed first and emphasized in bold.

| Top 10 Artists (Bonsang) | Song of the Year (Daesang) |
|---|---|
| **Psy**; **Busker Busker**; **Big Bang**; **2NE1**; **Sistar**; **Huh Gak**; **Beast**; **IU**; **Infinite**; **T-ara** | **Psy – "Gangnam Style"**; Busker Busker – "Cherry Blossom Ending"; Sistar – "Alone"; IU – "You & I"; Trouble Maker – "Trouble Maker" |
| Artist of the Year (Daesang) | Album of the Year (Daesang) |
| **Beast**; Busker Busker; Big Bang; Psy; IU | **Busker Busker – Busker Busker 1st Album**; IU – Last Fantasy; Big Bang – Alive; G-Dragon – One of a Kind; Psy – Psy 6 (Six Rules), Part 1 |
| Best New Artist | Best Rap/Hip Hop Award |
| **B.A.P**; **Ailee**; Ulala Session; Lee Hi; Juniel | **Dynamic Duo – "Without You"**; Epik High – "Its Cold"; Verbal Jint – "Pretty Enough"; Leessang – "Someday"; Primary – "See Through" |
| Best Rock Award | Best R&B/Ballad Award |
| **Nell – "The Day Before"**; CNBLUE – "Hey You"; F.T. Island – "Severely"; 10cm – "Fine and Thank You"; Rubber Fish – "Dont Live Like That" | **K.Will – "Please Don’t"**; Ailee – "Heaven"; 2AM – "I Wonder If You Hurt Like Me"; Baek Ji-young – "Voice"; Noel – "Fading Away" |
| Best OST Award | Hot Trend Award |
| **Eunji & Seo In-guk – "All For You" (from Reply 1997)**; Lyn – "Back in Time" (from Moon Embracing the Sun); Lee Jong-hyun – "My Love" (from A Gentleman's Dignity); Huh Gak – "One Person" (from Big); Noel – "To Live" (from Padam Padam) | **Trouble Maker** **– "Trouble Maker"**; Roy Kim & Jung Joon-young – "Becoming Dust"; Hyungdon & Daejoon – "The Gloomy Song"; Huh Gak & Zia – "I Need You"; Geeks feat. Soyou – "Officially Missing You, Too" |
| Best Pop Song | Popular Netizen Song |
| **Maroon 5 – "Payphone" (feat. Wiz Khalifa)** | **Beast – "Midnight"**; Xiah Junsu – "Love Is Like Snow"; Girls' Generation-TTS – "Twinkle"; Big Bang – "Fantastic Baby"; Shinhwa – "Venus"; IU – "You & I"; Kara – "Pandora"; G-Dragon – "Crayon" |

=== Other awards ===
| Nominees | Winners |
|---|---|
| Songwriter Award | Double Sidekick |
| Global Artist | Psy |
| Music Video of the Year | Cho Soo-hyun – Psy's "Gangnam Style" |
| MBC Music Star Award | Shindong & Kim Shin-young |
