= 2012 Mnet Asian Music Awards =

2012 music awards show

- Date: November 30, 2012
- Venue: Hong Kong Convention and Exhibition Centre, Hong Kong
- Hosted by: Song Joong-ki
- Most awards: Psy (4)
- Most nominations: Psy (6)

Television/radio coverage
- Networks
- South Korea: Mnet; Japan: Mnet Japan, Music On! TV; Southeast Asia: Channel M; Thailand: Bang Channel
- Runtime: around 240 minutes

The 2012 Mnet Asian Music Awards took place on November 30, 2012, at Hong Kong Convention and Exhibition Centre in Hong Kong. The ceremony was the third consecutive Mnet Asian Music Awards to occur outside of South Korea. It was reported by international news agencies such as Agence France-Presse, ITN, and was also broadcast in 85 countries around the world.

Leading the nominees was Psy with six nominations. By the end of the ceremony, Psy had won four awards, the most of any of the nominees, followed by boybands BigBang and Busker Busker with two each, excluding the special awards.

== Background ==
The event marked the fourteenth of the annual music awards. Using its slogan "Music Makes One" for the second consecutive time, MAMA was broadcast live in China, Japan, Hong Kong and Southeast Asia through various channels, as well as in the US and Canada.

During the Red Carpet, artists B.A.P, Davichi, Mike Izon, and Block B performed their songs "No Mercy", "Crash", "I'll Think of You", "Don't Say Goodbye", "Set Fire to the Rain" and "Nillili Mambo" respectively. International artists were seen with their greetings on screen during the main event including Dr. Dre and Jackie Chan.

== Performers ==
The following individuals and groups, listed in order of appearance, performed musical numbers at the ceremony.

Name(s)	Performed	Notes
Song Joong-ki, Jung Jae II, G-Dragon, Ailee, Pia & Bang Yong Guk	"Really", Freestyle rapping, "A Better Tomorrow"	"This Is The Moment" (Opening Act)
Gain, Sistar, Trouble Maker	"Bloom", "Alone", "Trouble Maker"	"Lady Mamalady"
Wang Leehom	"The Things You Never Knew", "Beautiful"	"Picture Your Song"
Epik High ft. Lee Hi	"It's Cold", "Don't Hate Me"	"HATE Mental Hospital"
Wooyoung, Park Jin-young (JYP)	"Sexy Lady", "DJ Got Me Goin' Crazy", "You're the One", "Gonna Make You Sweat (Everybody Dance Now)"	"The Memorial Of JYP"
Roy Kim	"Passing By", "누구를 위한 삶인가"	"My Way"
Adam Lambert	"Whataya Want from Me", "Trespassing"	"Time For Miracle"
EXO and SHINee	"Mama", "Warrior's Descendant", "Mirotic", "Lucifer", "Sherlock"	"Time Loop 2012"
Super Junior	"Spy", "Mr. Simple", "Sexy, Free & Single"	"Super Junior Never Die"
Li Yuchun, Natthew, TimeZ	"Hello Baby", "She's Bad", "Idol Hooray"	(Asian Acts)
Gaeko of Dynamic Duo, Zico, Double K, Loco, Davichi and Chuija	Various freestyle rapping	"Beats Rock The World"
BigBang	"Crayon", "Fantastic Baby"	"Monster In Me"
Seo In-young, B.o.B, and K.Will	"Anymore", "Airplanes", "Nothin' on You"	"The Tie Between Hong Kong"
Psy ft. Hyuna	"Gangnam Style"	"The Worldwide Phenomenon"

== Presenters ==
2012 Mnet Asian Music Awards host

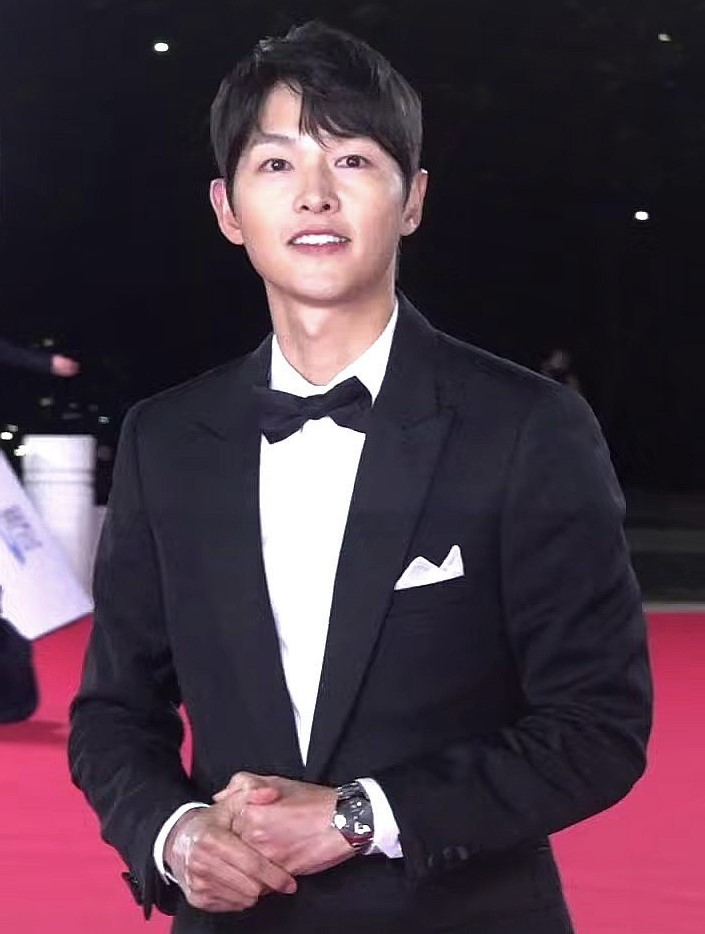
Song Joong-ki

- Song Joong-ki – welcome address
- Choi Minho and Jung Eun-ji – presented Best New Female Artist
- Simon Yam – presented Best Dance Performance - Solo
- Han Ga-in – presented Best Male Group
- Kim Kang-woo – Best Female Group
- Jung Il-woo – introduced performer Wang Leehom and presented the Overall Best Asian Artist
- Jung Gyu-woon and Chae Yeon – presented Best Collaboration Performance and Mnet PD's Choice
- Huang Tsz Ting – introduced performers Epik High ft. Lee Hi
- Jung Il-woo and Jo Yoon-hee – presented Best Dance Performance - Male Group and Female Group
- Han Chae-young – introduced performer Roy Kim
- Kim Sung-soo and Go Joon-hee – presented Best Vocal Performance - Solo and Group
- Krystal Jung – introduced performer Adam Lambert
- Kim Hyo-jin – presented International Favorite Artist
- Peng Yuyan and Bai Baihe – presented Best OST
- Han Ye-seul – introduced performers SHINee and EXO
- Han Chae-young – presented Best Music Video
- Victoria Song – presented TVB Choice Award
- Kim Hyo-jin – introduced performer Li Yuchun
- Park Shin-hye and Yoon Shi-yoon – presented Best New Asian Group
- Jung Suk-won and Yun-gil Jeong – presented Best Style in Music
- Angelababy – presented Guardian Angel Worldwide Performer
- Danny (대니) – Guest host - Introduced Hip-hop performers
- Shin Bora and Ailee – presented Best Rap Performance
- Bolin Chen – presented Best Male Artist
- Choi Ji-woo – presented Best Line Award, introduced performers Big Bang
- Song Seung-heon – presented Best Global Group
- Song Joong-ki – introduced performer Psy
- Yoo Seung-jun, Helen Yao and Zhang Lanxin – Introduced the three grand awards through the movie CZ12
- Jackie Chan and Han Ye-seul – presented Artist of the Year
- Song Seung-heon and Han Ga-in – presented Album of the Year
- Choi Ji-woo and Jung Woo-sung – presented Song of the Year
- Song Joong-ki – Closing remarks

== Winners and nominees ==
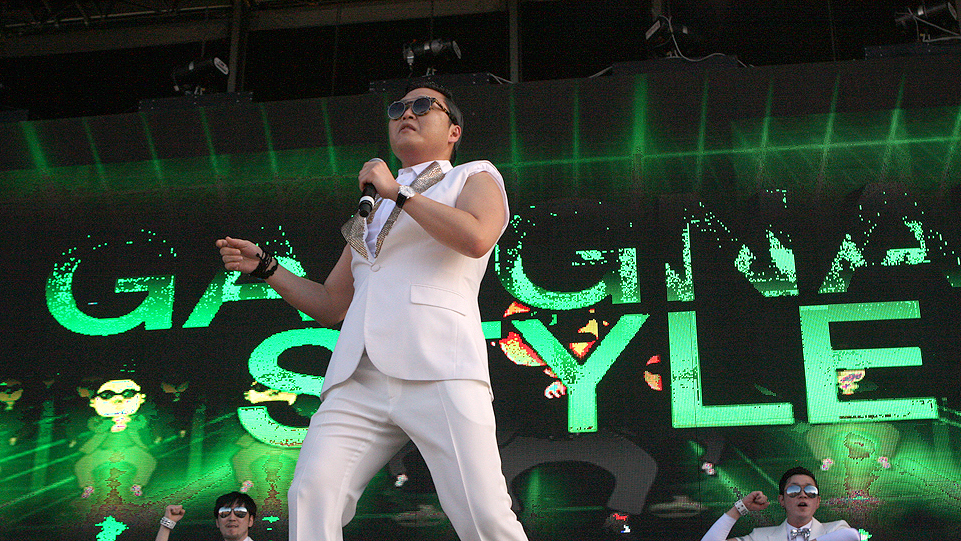
Psy, Song of the Year and more

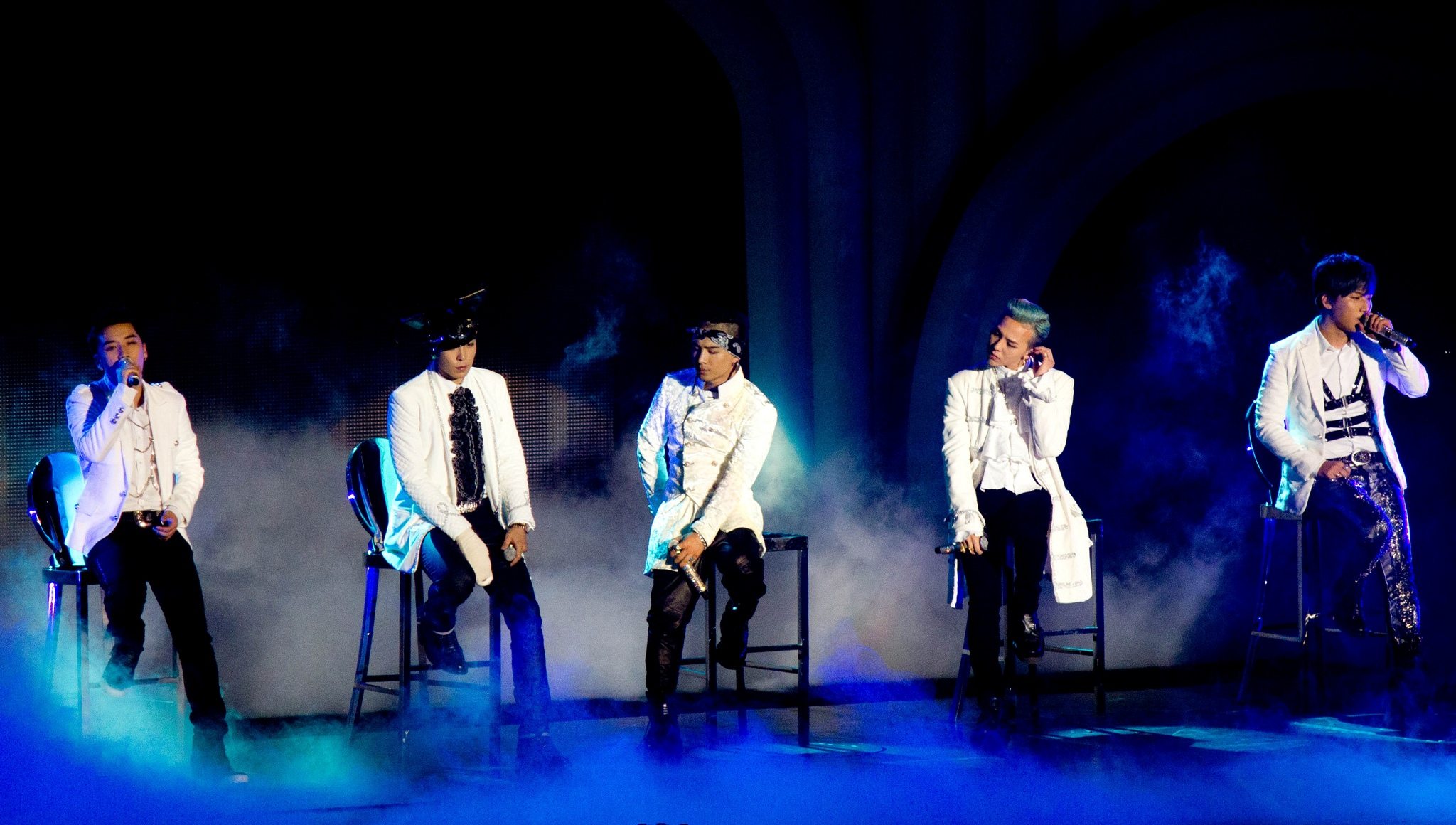
BigBang, Artist of the Year and more

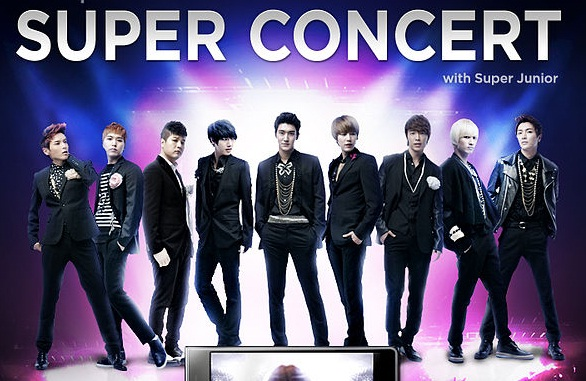
Super Junior, Album of the Year and more

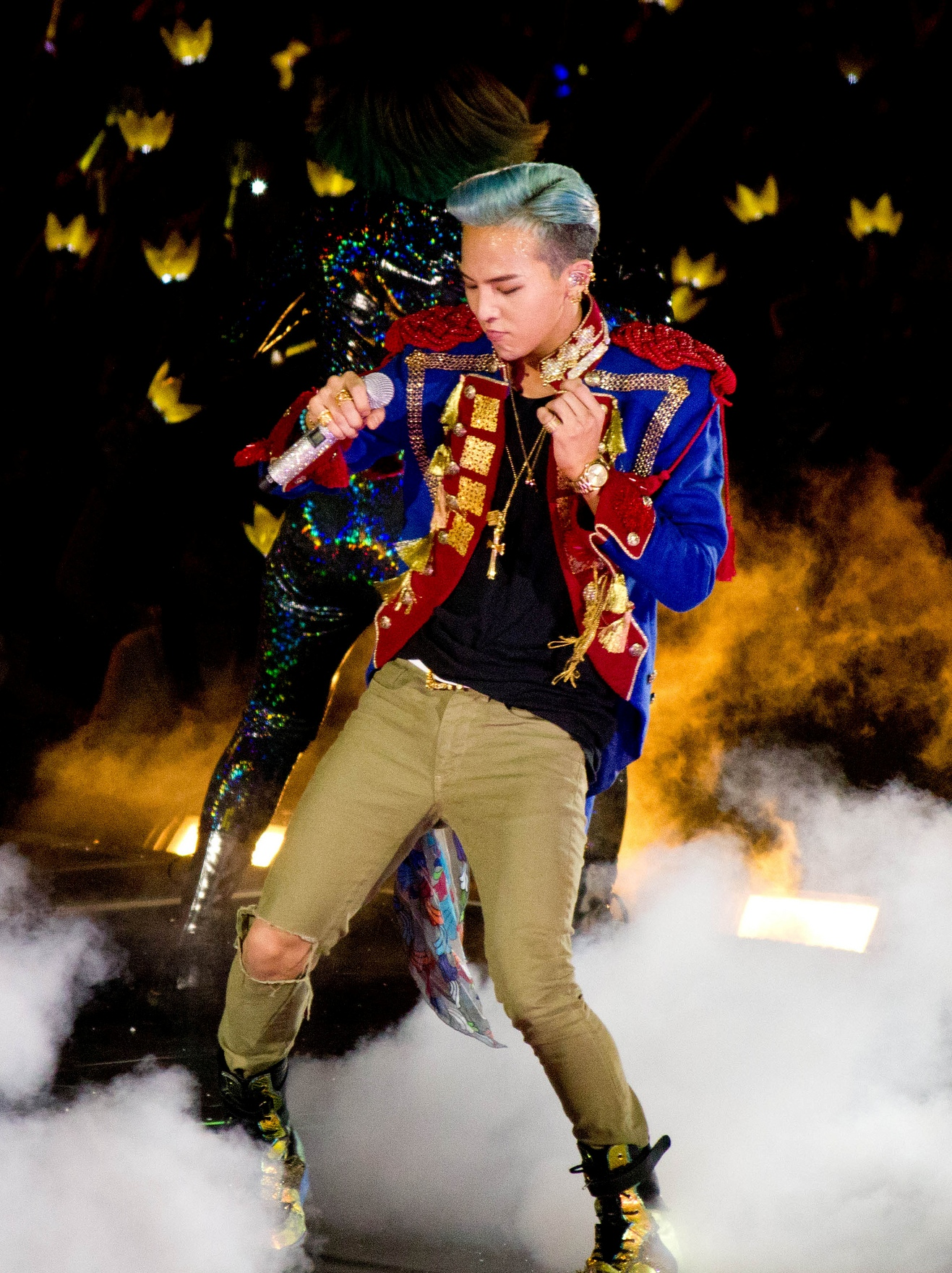
G-Dragon, Best Male Artist

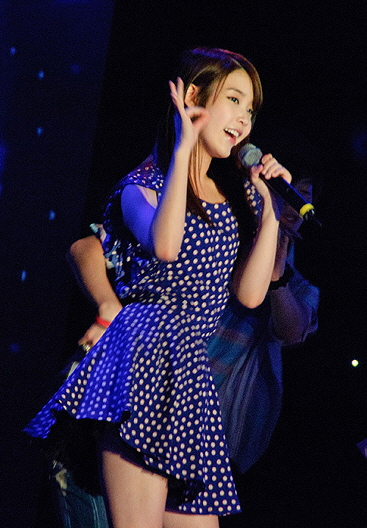
IU, Best Female Artist

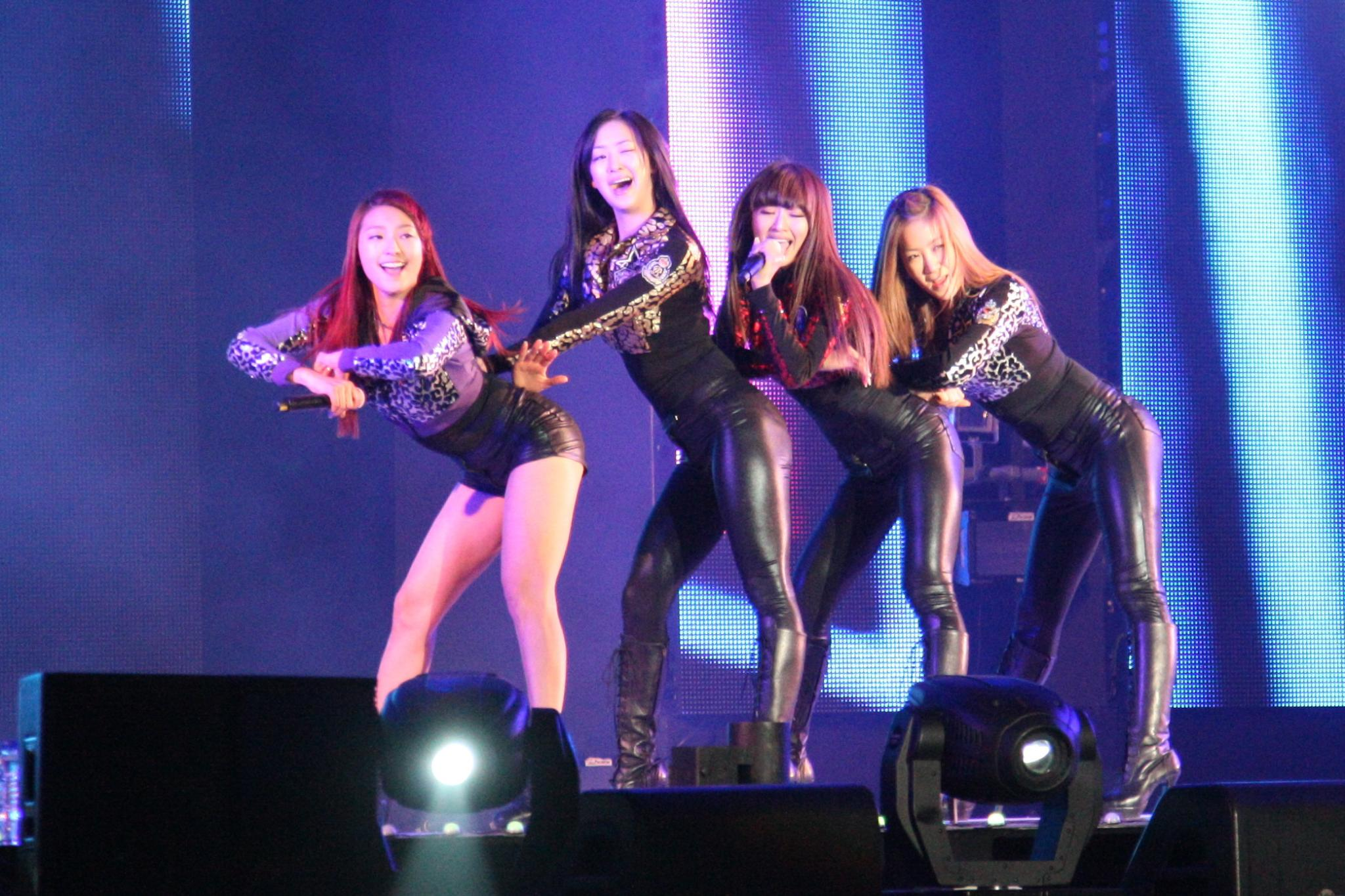
Sistar, Best Female Group

Best Dance Performers

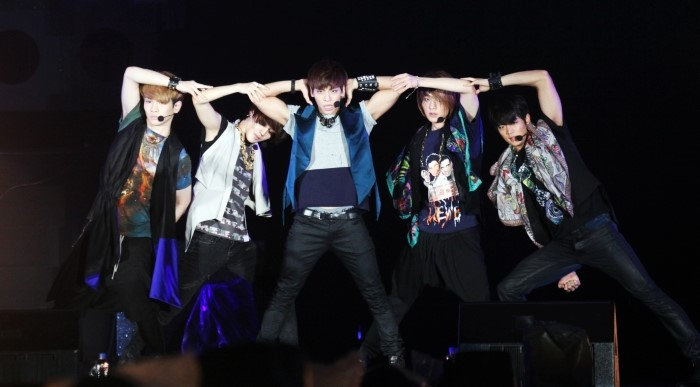
Shinee

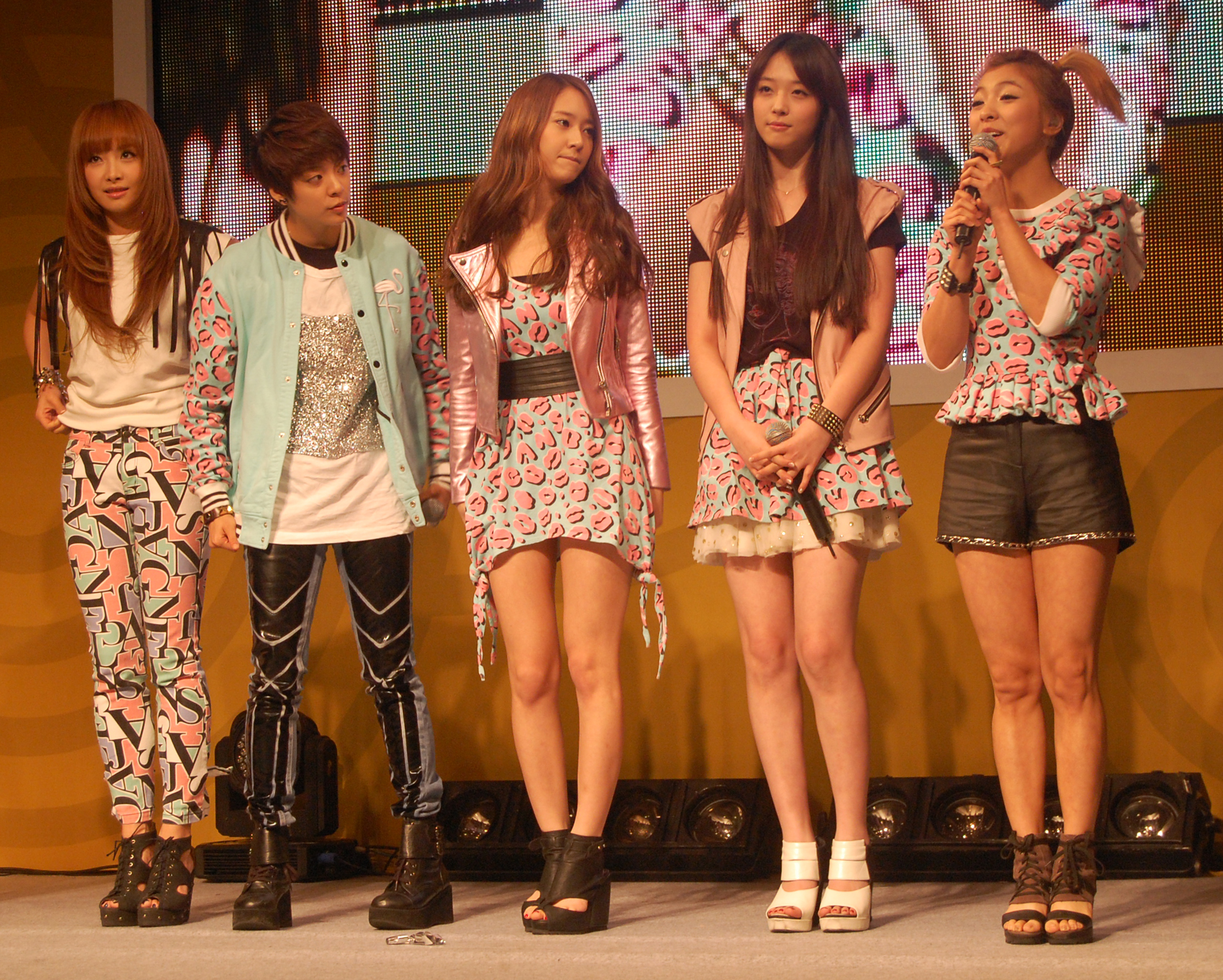
f(x)

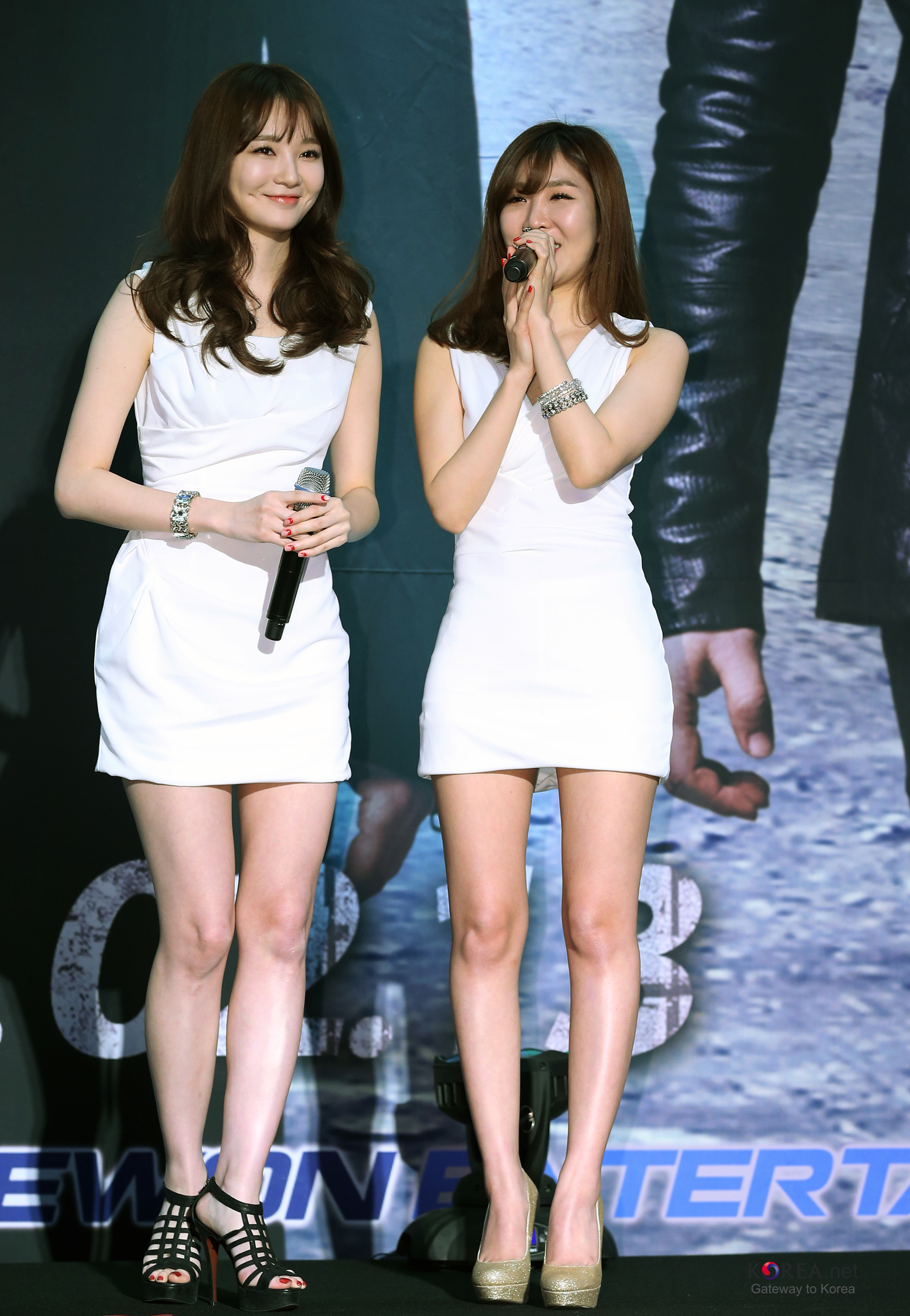
Davichi, Best Vocal Performer – Group

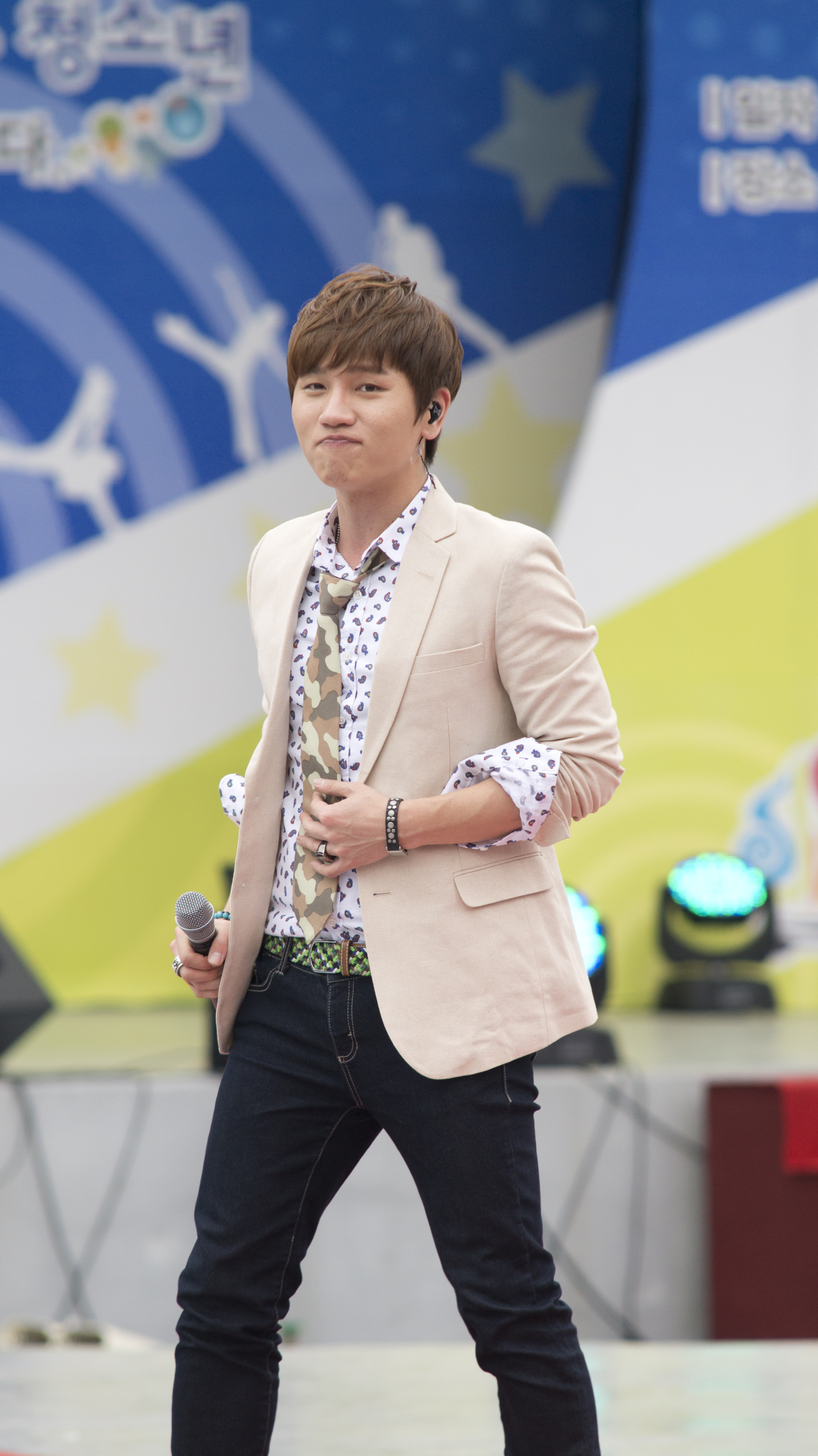
K.Will, Best Vocal Performer – Solo

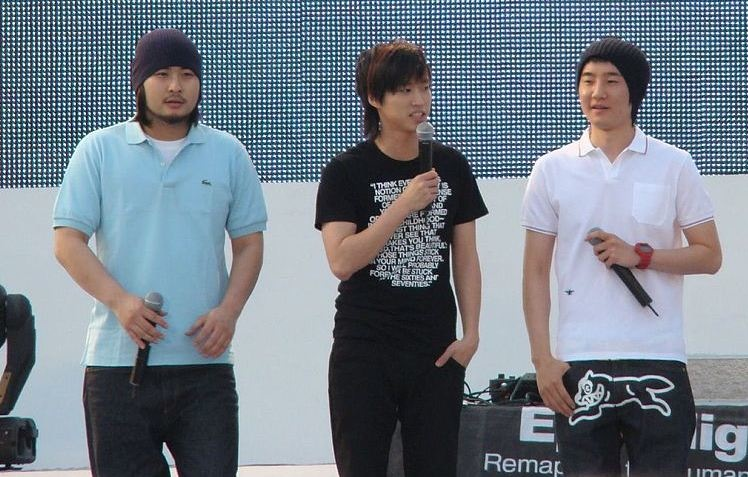
Epik High, Best Rap Performers

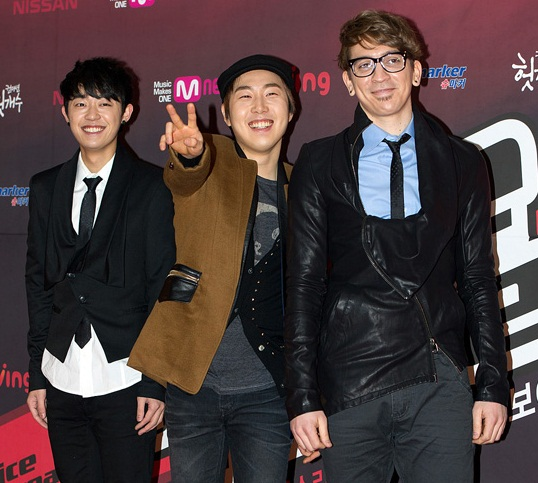
Busker Busker, New Male Artist and Band Performers

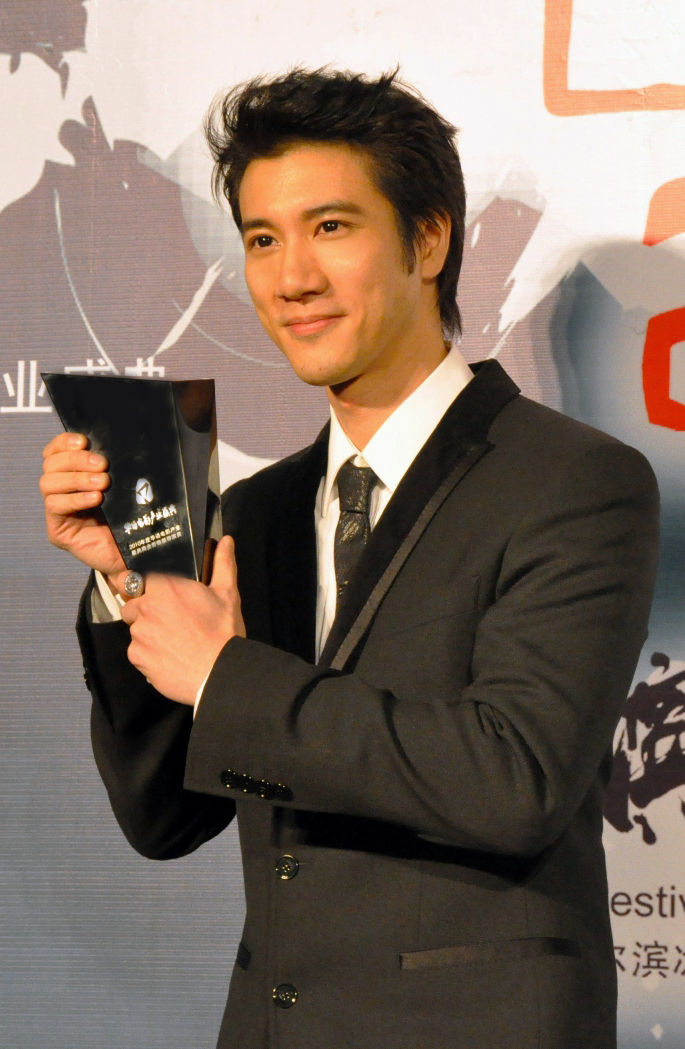
Wang Leehom, Overall Best Asian Artist

Best Asian Artist

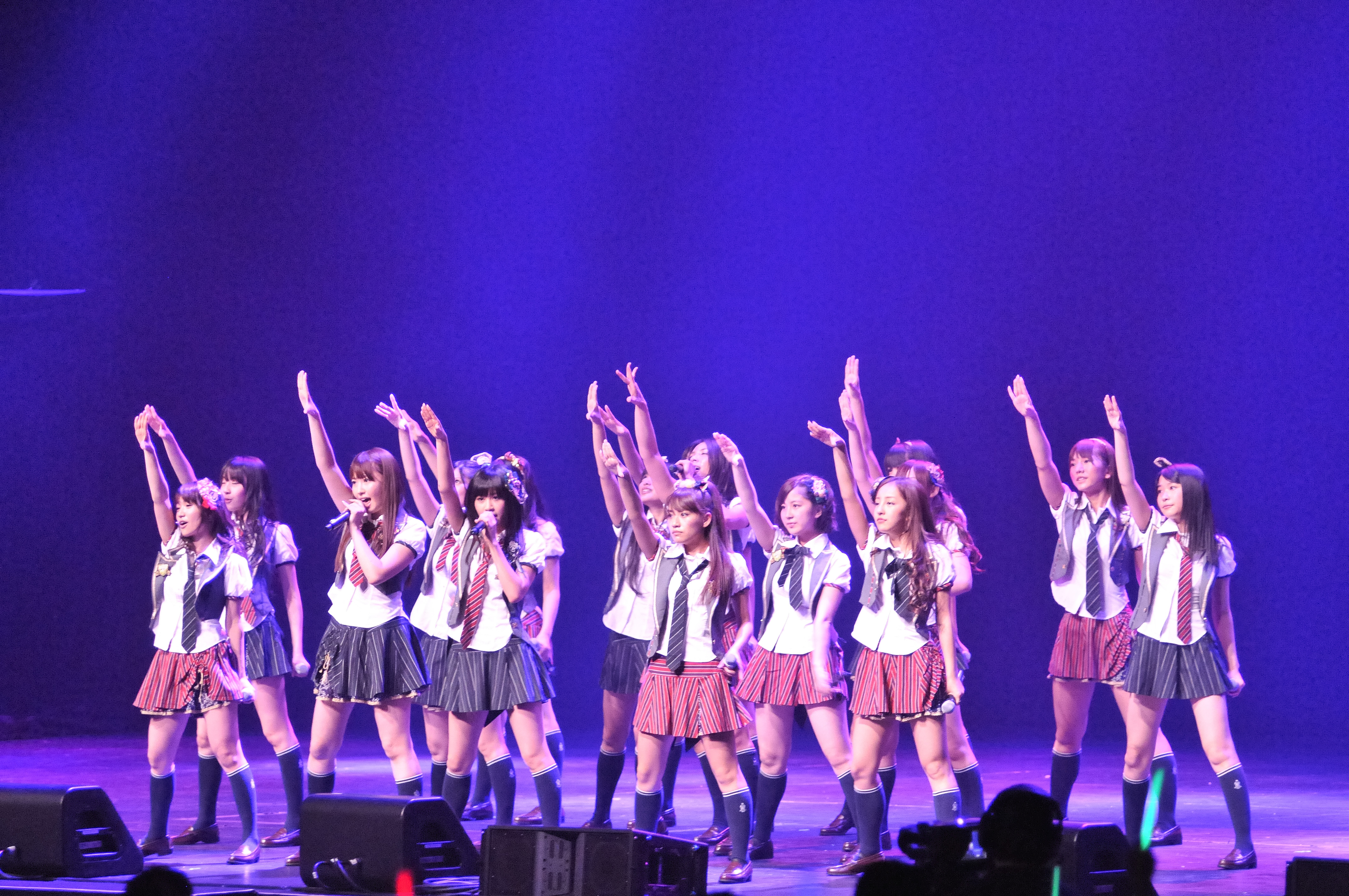
AKB48

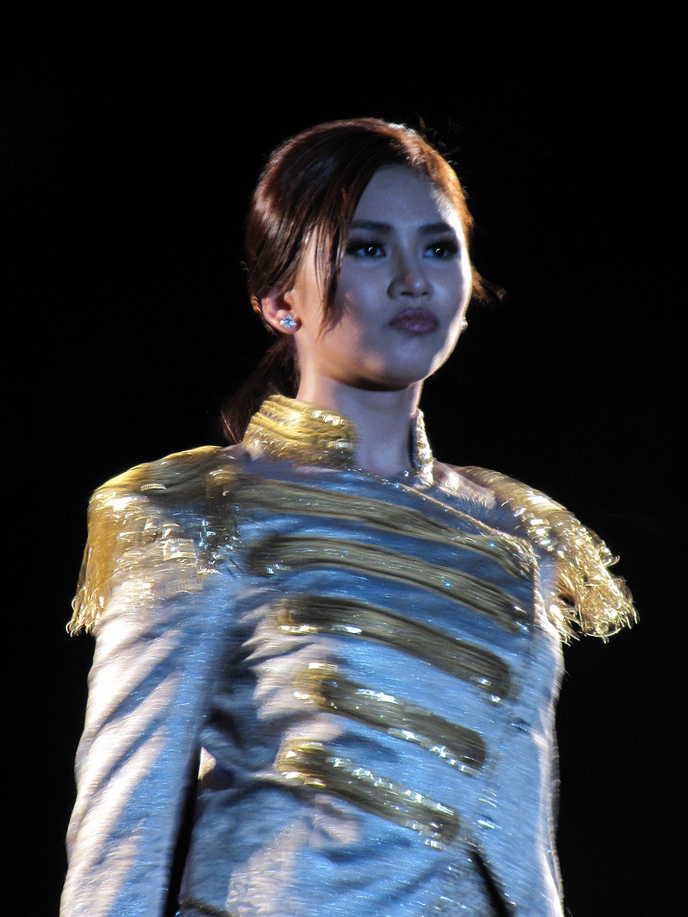
Sarah Geronimo

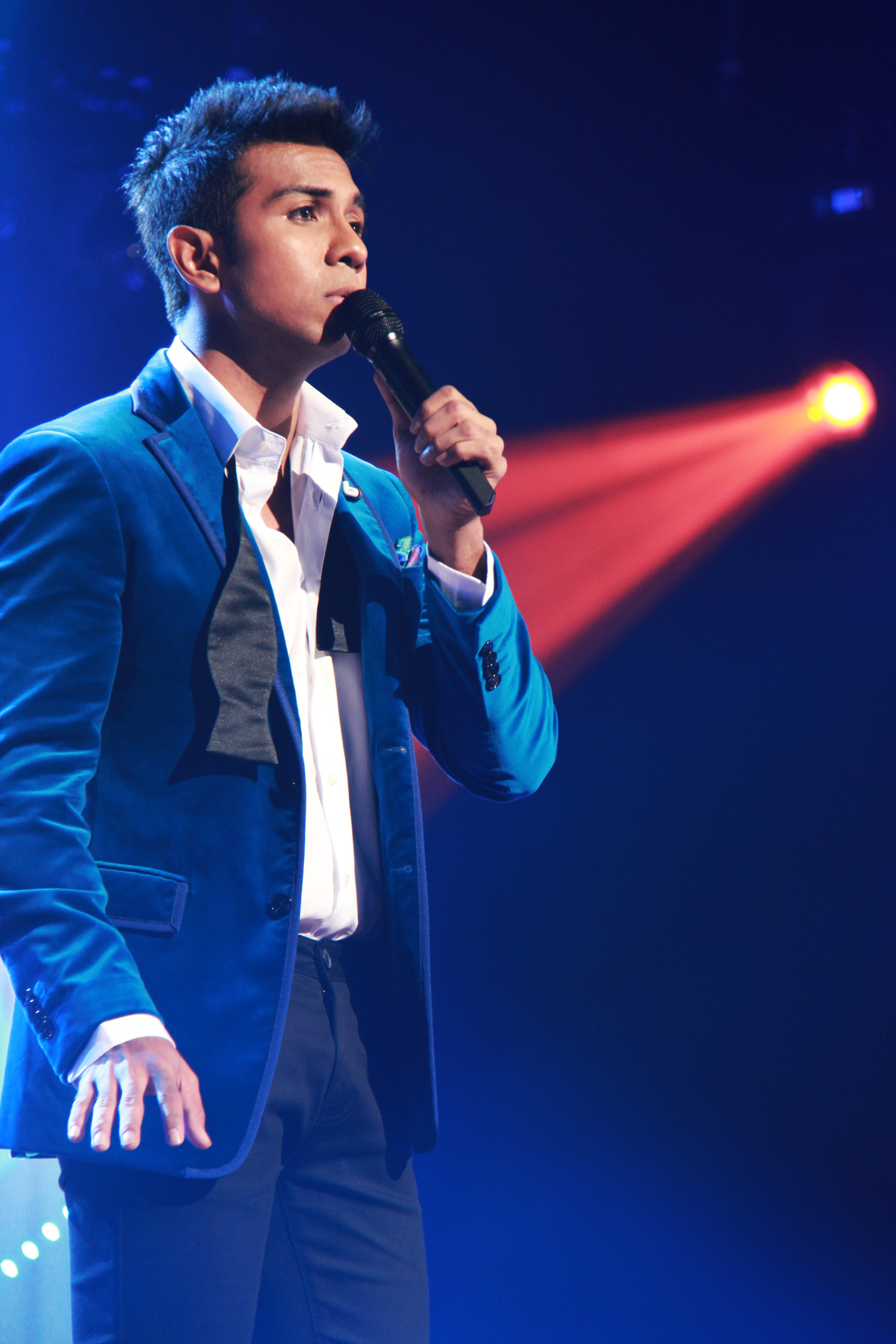
Taufik Batisah

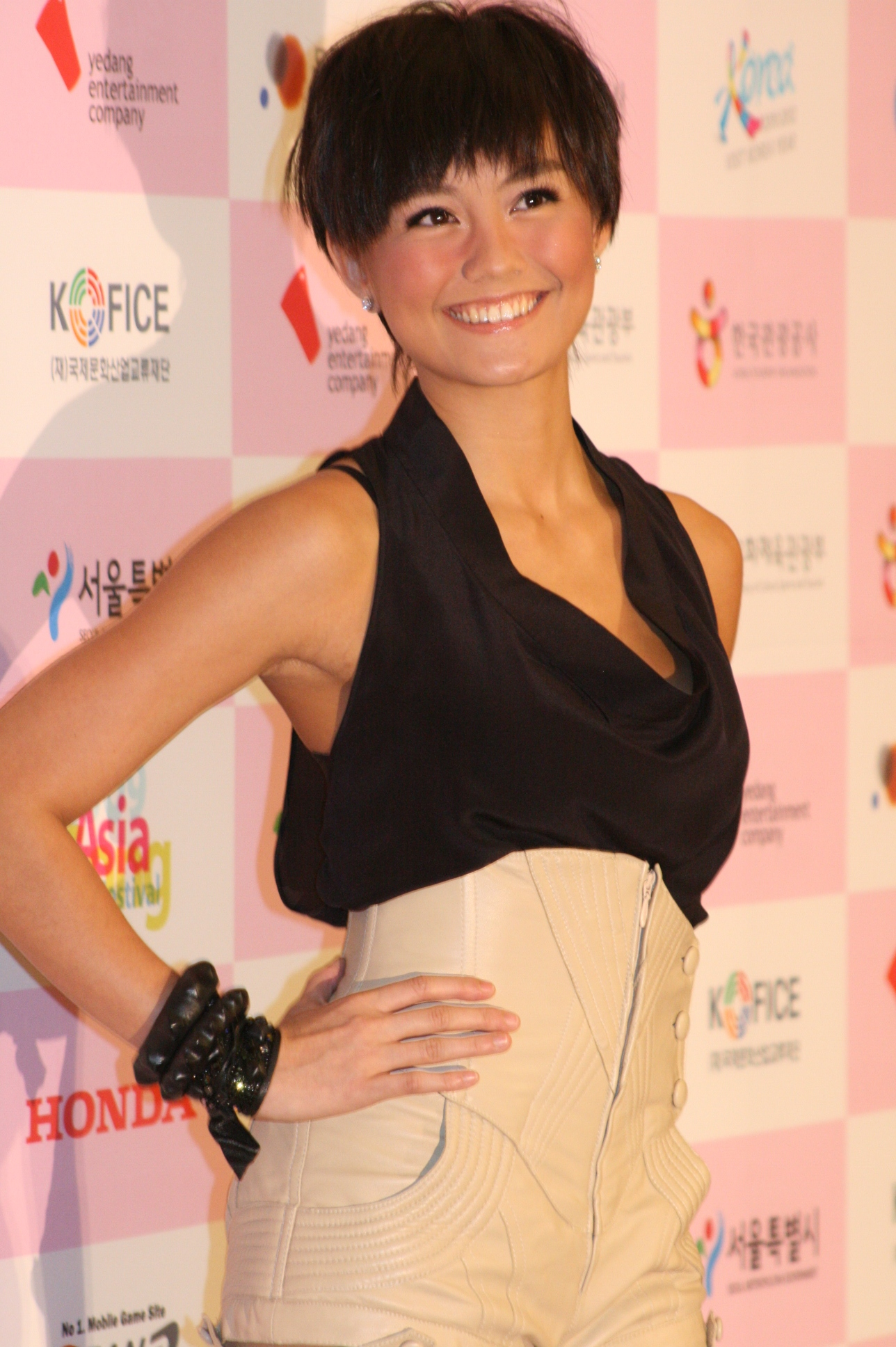
Agnez Mo

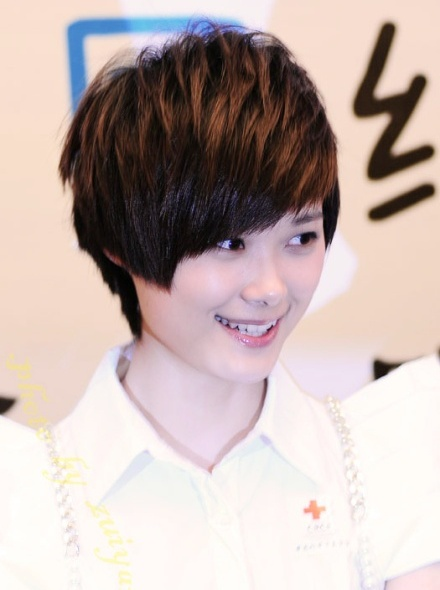
Li Yuchun

Winners are listed first and highlighted in boldface.

Song of the Year (daesang)	Artist of the Year (daesang)
**Psy – "Gangnam Style"**; Busker Busker – "Cherry Blossom Ending"; IU – "You & I"; Sistar – "Alone"; Super Junior – "Sexy, Free & Single"	**BigBang**; Busker Busker; Super Junior; Psy; Sistar
Album of the Year (daesang)	Best Music Video
**Super Junior – Sexy, Free & Single**; G-Dragon – One of a Kind; TVXQ – Catch Me; Busker Busker – Busker Busker 1st Album; BigBang – Alive	**Psy – "Gangnam Style"**; BigBang – "Monster"; Gain – "Bloom"; Infinite – "The Chaser"; Naul – "Memory Of The Wind"
Best Male Artist	Best Female Artist
**G-Dragon**; K.Will; Park Jin-young (JYP); Se7en; Psy	**IU**; Baek Ji-young; BoA; Gain; G.NA
Best Male Group	Best Female Group
**BigBang**; TVXQ; Beast; Super Junior; Shinhwa	**Sistar**; 2NE1; Girls' Generation-TTS; KARA; T-ara
Best Dance Performance – Male Group	Best Dance Performance – Female Group
**SHINee – "Sherlock"**; Beast – "Beautiful Night"; Super Junior – "Sexy, Free & Single"; MBLAQ – "This Is War"; Infinite – "The Chaser"	**f(x) – "Electric Shock"**; 4Minute – "Volume Up"; Miss A – "Touch"; Secret – "Poison"; Sistar – "Alone"
Best Dance Performance – Solo	Best Band Performance
**Psy – "Gangnam Style"**; BoA – "Only One"; Hyuna – "Ice Cream"; Park Jin-young (JYP) – "You're The One"; Seo In-young – "Let's Dance"	**Busker Busker – "Cherry Blossom Ending"**; 10cm – "Fine Thank You And You"; CNBLUE – "Hey You"; F.T. Island – "Severely"; Nell – "The Day Before"
Best Vocal Performance – Group	Best Vocal Performance – Solo
**Davichi – "Will Think Of You"**; 2AM – "I Wonder If You Hurt Like Me"; Noel – "I Miss You"; Urban Zakapa – "I Hate You"; 4Men – "The Man, The Woman"	**K.Will – "I Need You"**; Baek Ji-young – "Voice"; IU – "You And I"; John Park – "Falling"; Huh Gak – "The Person Who Once Loved Me"
Best OST	Best Rap Performance
**Seo In-guk & Jung Eun-ji – "All For You" (Reply 1997)**; Lyn – "Back In Time" (Moon Embracing the Sun); Lee Jong-hyun – "My Love" (A Gentleman's Dignity); Taeyeon – "Missing You Like Crazy" (The King 2 Hearts); Huh Gak – "One Person" (Big)	**Epik High – "Up"**; Dynamic Duo – "Without You"; Leessang – "Someday"; Mighty Mouth – "Bad Boy"; Verbal Jint – "You Deserve Better"
Best New Male Artist	Best New Female Artist
**Busker Busker**; B.A.P; Exo; John Park; Ulala Session	**Ailee**; AOA; Spica; Juniel; Hello Venus
International Favorite Artist	Best Collaboration Performance
**Psy – "Gangnam Style"**	**Trouble Maker – "Trouble Maker"**; Davichi & T-ara – "We Were In Love"; Park Jin-young (JYP) & Gain – "Someone Else"; Huh Gak & Zia – "I Need You"; Skull & Haha – "Busan Vacance"
Best Global Group – Female	Best Global Group – Male
**Kara**; 2NE1; f(x); Girls' Generation-TTS; Wonder Girls	**Super Junior**; Beast; BigBang; CNBLUE; TVXQ

Special Awards

- Mnet PD's Choice: **BAP**
- Overall Best Asian Artist: **Wang Leehom**
  - Asian Artist Award:

AKB48
Sarah Geronimo
My Tam
Taufik Batisah
Agnes Monica
Chris Lee (Li Yuchun)

- Best New Asian Group:

Exo
TimeZ
Natthew

- TVB Choice Award: **Joey Yung**
- Best Style in Music: **Son Ga-in**
- Guardian Angel Worldwide Performer: **BigBang**
- Best Line Award: **Super Junior**

== Multiple awards ==
=== Artist(s) with multiple wins ===
The following artist(s) received two or more wins (excluding the special awards):

Awards	Artist(s)
4	Psy
2	BigBang
2	Busker Busker
2	Super Junior

=== Artist(s) with multiple nominations ===
The following artist(s) received two or more nominations:

Nominations	Artist(s)
6	Psy
6	Super Junior
5	Busker Busker
5	BigBang
4	Sistar
3	Gain (Note: Including collaborations.)
3	Park Jin-young (JYP)
3	Huh Gak
3	IU
3	TVXQ
3	Beast
2	G-Dragon
2	Infinite
2	K.Will
2	John Park
2	Davichi
2	T-ara
2	KARA
2	2NE1
2	f(x)
2	Girls' Generation-TTS
2	CNBLUE

== Broadcast ==
Network	Country
Mnet	South Korea
tvN	South Korea
CJ E&M channels	South Korea
Mnet Japan	Japan
TVB	Hong Kong
MyTV-Cambodia	Other countries around the world
KM	Other countries around the world
Mnet America	Other countries around the world
Channel M	Other countries around the world
Myx Philippines	Other countries around the world
Studio 23 now ABS-CBN Sports and Action ( PHILIPPINES )	Other countries around the world
And all other channels that carried Mnet Asian Music Awards in Japan, Malaysia, Indonesia, Singapore and Europe.
