= Lim Kim =

South Korean singer (born 1994)

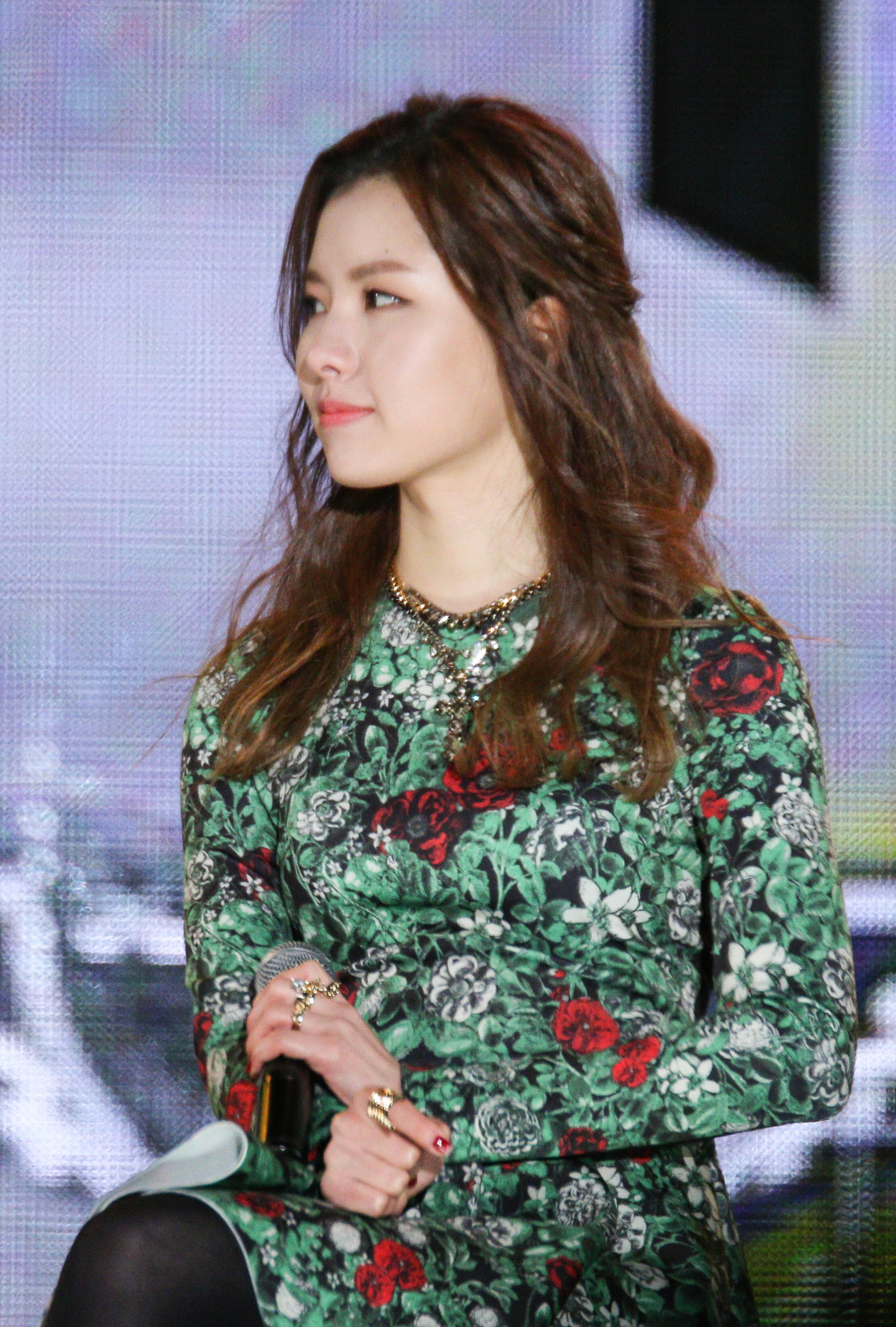
- Lim Kim in 2014

Background information
- Born: Kim Ye-rim; January 21, 1994 (age 32); Seoul, South Korea
- Genres: K-pop, indie pop, folk rock
- Occupation: Singer
- Years active: 2011–2016; 2019–
- Label: New Entry

Korean name
- Hangul: 김예림
- Hanja: 金藝琳
- RR: Gim Yerim
- MR: Kim Yerim

Lim Kim (born January 21, 1994), birth name Kim Ye-rim (Korean: 김예림), is a South Korean singer and a member of the band Togeworl with Do Dae-yoon. She competed in the Superstar K3 singing competition as a member of Togeworl, placing third. In 2013, Kim debuted as a solo singer, and is known for the song "All Right." She left Mystic Entertainment after her contract ended in 2016.

== Biography ==
Kim was born in South Korea. For high school, she decided to go overseas, and attended Leonia High School in New Jersey. While attending high school in 2011, she heard about the New York City auditions for the South Korean singing competition Superstar K3. She asked a fellow Korean student Do Dae-yoon, who was known as a great guitarist at the school, to audition together, even though she did not know him well. He agreed, and they formed the band Togeworl. Togeworl managed to pass the audition, and flew to Seoul to compete. The duo were successful, and were picked to be mentored by singer-songwriter Yoon Jong-shin. Eventually they finished third in the competition, after Ulala Session and Busker Busker.

After the competition, Kim and Do remained in South Korea, where they continued to receive musical training, and signed a contract with Mystic89. Togeworl released their first song in February 2012 for the soundtrack for the TVN variety show The Romantic. Kim began attending high school in Bundang District, Seoul in March 2012.

In March 2012, Kim made an appearance in the drama Flower Band, and released two songs for the soundtrack, "Two Months" and "Love U Like U," which was a duet with L from the boyband Infinite.

Though Togeworl planned to debut in 2013, member Do Dae-yoon had to return to the United States, due to issues with high school. Because of this, it was decided Kim should debut as a solo artist before reuniting as a duo.

In June 2013, Kim released the extended play A Voice, led by the song "All Right." The song was successful, reaching number two on Gaon's singles chart. Then, she released a second extended play in September, Her Voice, and a full-length album in November called Goodbye 20.

In April 2015, she released her third extended play, Simple Mind. The track "Awoo" was the only K-pop song included on Spin's 101 Best Songs of 2015, coming in at No. 51. In the article, Andrew Unterberger praised the song, saying "no [American] pop song this year breathed like this Korean emoji of a pop song" and calling it "a kinetic environment bursting with creativity, synthesis, and an intrinsic passion". Billboard's 20 Best K-Pop Songs of 2015 ranked the song at No. 8, claiming that Kim outdid herself and praising the song's "mix of woozy synths, trance-like chants, and trappy snares [...] pulled off with a sense of sophistication that's hard to make believable."

On May 30, 2016, Mystic Entertainment posted an official statement announcing Kim's departure from the label after her contract has ended.

After an over-three-year hiatus, Lim Kim released "Sal-ki", her first published song as a rapper, on May 24, 2019. Her new EP Generasian was released independently on October 15, 2019. Generasian won the award for Best Dance & Electronic Album and "Sal-ki" won Best Dance & Electronic Song at the 2020 Korean Music Awards.

On December 9, 2021, Kim signed a contract with New Entry.

== Artistry ==
Kim is known for her empowering lyrics, which demonstrate her interpretation of what it means to be a modern-day woman and attempt to tear down the Orientalist stereotypes of the West.

== Discography ==
=== Studio albums ===
| Title | Album details | Peak chart positions | Sales |
| Title | Album details | KOR | Sales |
|---|---|---|---|
| Goodbye 20 | Released: November 18, 2013; Label: Mystic89; Format: CD, digital download; Track list: 1. "Goodbye 20"; 2. "What Should I Do To You" (널 어쩌면 좋을까); 3. "Number 1"; 4. "Colorring" (컬러링); 5. "Alice" (캐럴의 말장난); 6. "All Right"; 7. "Without Knowing It All" (잘 알지도 못하면서); 8. "Urban Green"; 9. "Rain"; 10. "Voice" (feat. Swings); 11. "Say Love" (사랑한다 말해요); 12. "Drunken Shrimp"; 13. "Truth Never Matters" (언제 진실이 중요했던 적 있었니); 14. "Urban Green" (English version) | 13 | KOR: 2,753 |

=== Extended plays ===
| Title | Album details | Peak chart positions | Sales |
| Title | Album details | KOR | Sales |
|---|---|---|---|
| A Voice | Released: June 17, 2013; Label: Mystic89; Format: CD, digital download; Track list: 1. "Number 1"; 2. "Colorring" (컬러링); 3. "Alice" (캐럴의 말장난); 4. "All Right"; 5. "Without Knowing It All" (잘 알지도 못하면서) | 15 | KOR: 1,632 |
| Her Voice | Released: September 9, 2013; Label: Mystic89; Format: CD, digital download; Track list: 1. "Urban Green" (Korean version); 2. "Rain"; 3. "Voice" (feat. Swings); 4. "Say Love" (사랑한다 말해요); 5. "Drunken Shrimp"; 6. "Truth Never Matters" (언제 진실이 중요했던 적 있었니); 7. "Urban Green" (English version) | 16 | KOR: 2,035 |
| Simple Mind | Released: April 27, 2015; Label: Mystic89; Format: CD, digital download; Track list: 1. "Awoo"; 2. "Love Game" (알면 다쳐); 3. "Wind" (바람아) (feat. Beenzino); 4. "You First" (먼저 말해); 5. "No More"; 6. "Upgrader"; 7. "Paper Bird" (종이새) | 16 | KOR: 1,773 |
| Generasian | Released: October 15, 2019; Label: Lim Company/Independent; Format: streaming, digital download | — | |

=== Single albums ===
| Title | Album details | Peak chart positions |
| Title | Album details | KOR |
|---|---|---|
| Naver Music Showcase (김예림의 가로수길 카페에서 : 네이버뮤직 음악감상회) | Released: December 24, 2013; Label: Mystic89; Format: CD, digital download; Track list: 1. "Urban Green"; 2. "Rain" | — |
| Beat House Live # 2 (비트하우스 라이브 No. 2 – 김예림) | Released: September 22, 2015; Label: Mystic89; Format: CD, digital download; Track list: 1. "Think About` Chu"; 2. "Rain" | — |

=== Singles ===
| Title | Year | Peak chart positions | | Sales | Album |
| Title | Year | KOR Gaon | KOR Hot 100 | Sales | Album |
As lead artist
| "Colorring" (컬러링) | 2013 | 16 | 7 | KOR: 423,056 | A Voice |
| "All Right" | 2013 | 2 | 3 | KOR: 1,062,112 | A Voice |
| "Rain" | 2013 | 5 | 7 | KOR: 359,368 | Her Voice |
| "Voice" feat. Swings | 2013 | 7 | 14 | KOR: 273,220 | Her Voice |
| "I'm Asking You" (부탁할게요) | 2013 | 85 | — | KOR: 54,905 | The Suspicious Housekeeper OST |
| "Goodbye 20" | 2013 | 12 | 18 | KOR: 199,516 | Goodbye 20 |
| "Happy Me" (행복한 나를) | 2013 | 4 | 3 | KOR: 543,552 | Reply 1994 OST |
| "Awoo" | 2015 | 22 | —N/a | KOR: 183,694 | Simple Mind |
| "Love Game" (알면 다쳐) | 2015 | 29 | —N/a | KOR: 105,000 | Simple Mind |
| "Who Are You?" (너, 누구니) | 2015 | — | —N/a | —N/a | Hello Monster OST |
| "Stay Ever" feat. Verbal Jint | 2015 | — | —N/a | KOR: 27,813 | Non-album singles |
| "Sal-ki" | 2019 | — | —N/a | —N/a | Non-album singles |
| "Yellow" | 2019 | — | — | —N/a | Generasian |
| "Mong" | 2019 | — | — | —N/a | Generasian |
| "All Right Remix" | 2020 | — | — | —N/a | Non-album singles |
| "Mago" | 2021 | — | — | —N/a | Non-album singles |
| "Falling (Prod. by DPR Cream)" | 2021 | — | — | —N/a | Non-album singles |
| "Falling" | 2021 | — | — | —N/a | Begin Again Open Mic OST |
| "The Moment" | 2021 | — (Note: "The Moment" did not enter the Circle Digital Chart, but peaked at number 196 on the Circle Download Chart.) | — | —N/a | Reflection of You OST |
| "Veil" | 2022 | — | — | —N/a | Non-album singles |
| "Damn Cold" | 2023 | — | — | —N/a | Non-album singles |
| "Lion" | 2023 | — | — | —N/a | Webtoon Singer - Jeongnyeon OST |
| "Confess To You" | 2023 | — | — | —N/a | King the Land OST |
| "Already One Year" (벌써 일년) | 2023 | — | — | —N/a | A Time Called You OST |
| "ULT" (궁) | 2024 | — (Note: "ULT" did not enter the Circle Digital Chart, but peaked at number 117 on the Circle Download Chart.) | — | —N/a | Non-album single |
Collaborations
| "Love U Like U" with L | 2012 | 27 | 48 | KOR: 233,449 | Flower Band OST |
| "Soap" (비누) with Lee Seung-hwan | 2013 | 43 | — | KOR: 51,614 | Fall to Fly |
| "Christmas Wishes" (크리스마스 소원) with Park Ji-yoon, Jang Jae-in, Puer Kim | 2013 | 43 | — | KOR: 111,761 | Mystic Holiday 2013 |
| "Roommate" (룸메이트) with Eddy Kim | 2014 | 40 | — | KOR: 106,525 | Roommate OST |
| "Winter of Haeundae" (겨울 해운대) with Zizo | 2014 | 64 | —N/a | KOR: 42,717 | Non-album singles |
| "Myung Soo House Ddok Bbok I" (명수네 떡볶이) with Park Myung Soo & UL | 2014 | 2 | —N/a | KOR: 520,923 | Non-album singles |
| "His Habit" with Kim Hyun Joong | 2014 | — | —N/a | —N/a | Timing |
| "A Little Close" (해요 말고 해) with High4 | 2014 | 29 | —N/a | KOR: 95,715 | Hi High |
| "Are You a Grown Up?" (어른 맞니) with Kei G Travus | 2015 | 90 | —N/a | KOR: 23,472 | Non-album singles |
| "Coffee" (커피) with Yoo Jae-hwan | 2015 | 5 | —N/a | KOR: 566,792 | Non-album singles |
| "Imagine" with Ha Dong-kyun | 2021 | — | —N/a | —N/a | Begin Again Open Mic OST |
| "Say Something" with Ha Dong-kyun | 2021 | — | —N/a | —N/a | Begin Again Open Mic OST |
| "Love Me Crazy" with Jamie | 2023 | — (Note: "Love Me Crazy" did not enter the Circle Digital Chart, but peaked at number 138 on the Circle Download Chart.) | —N/a | —N/a | SM Station Season 4 |
| "Romantico" with TETE | 2023 | — | —N/a | —N/a | Non-album singles |
| "First Night" (초야) with Kim Chang-wan | 2025 | — (Note: "First Night" did not enter the Circle Digital Chart, but peaked at number 73 on the Circle Download Chart.) | —N/a | —N/a | Non-album singles |
"—" denotes release did not chart.

=== Other charted songs ===
| Title | Year | Peak chart positions | | Album |
| Title | Year | KOR Gaon | KOR Hot 100 | Album |
|---|---|---|---|---|
| "Without Knowing It All" (잘 알지도 못하면서) | 2013 | 25 | 31 | A Voice |
| "Alice" (캐럴의 말장난) | 2013 | 68 | — | A Voice |
| "Say Love" (사랑한다 말해요) | 2013 | 66 | 61 | Her Voice |
| "Urban Green" | 2013 | 81 | — | Her Voice |
| "Drunken Shrimp" | 2013 | 87 | — | Her Voice |
| "Truth Never Matters" (언제 진실이 중요했던 적 있었니) | 2013 | 88 | — | Her Voice |
| "What Should I Do To You" (널 어쩌면 좋을까) | 2013 | 57 | 40 | Goodbye 20 |
| "No More" | 2015 | 96 | | Simple Mind |
| "Wind" (바람아) feat. Beenzino | 2015 | 63 | —N/a | Simple Mind |
"—" denotes release did not chart.

=== Participation in albums ===
| Title | Year | Peak chart positions | | Artist(s) | Album |
| Title | Year | KOR Gaon | KOR Hot 100 | Artist(s) | Album |
|---|---|---|---|---|---|
| "Last Scene" (라스트 씬) | 2014 | — | —N/a | philtre feat. Choiza & Lim Kim | Philtre : Scene #2 |
| "Someone I Know" (아는 남자) | 2014 | — | —N/a | Cho Hyung Woo feat. Lim Kim | Him |
| "My Ballad" | 2014 | 60 | —N/a | Swings feat. Lim Kim | Vintage Swings |
| "Pianissimo" | 2014 | 16 | —N/a | Toy feat. Lim Kim | Da Capo |
| "Gondry" (공드리) | 2015 | — | —N/a | Primary & Oh Hyuk feat. Lim Kim | Lucky You! |
| "Yellow (Only Onstage Ver.)" | 2020 | — | —N/a | Lim Kim | Only Onstage: 10 |
| "Waterfall" | 2022 | — (Note: "Waterfall" did not enter the Circle Digital Chart, but peaked at number 103 on the Circle Download Chart.) | —N/a | Minho feat. Lim Kim | Chase |
"—" denotes release did not chart.

== Filmography ==
=== Television ===
| Year | Title | Role |
|---|---|---|
| 2014 | Entertain Us | Herself |
| 2013 | Running Man | Herself |
| 2013 | Monstar | Choi Kyung (young) |
| 2012 | Flower Band | Ye-Rim (fictional character) |
| 2012 | Superstar K3 | Herself |

== Awards and nominations ==
| Year | Award | Category | Work | Result |
|---|---|---|---|---|
| 2013 | 5th Melon Music Awards | Best Newcomer | Herself | Won |
| 2013 | 15th Mnet Asian Music Awards | Best New Female Artist | Herself | Nominated |
| 2014 | 28th Golden Disk Awards | Best Newcomer | Herself | Won |
| 2014 | 20th Korea Entertainment Arts Awards | Best Ballad Artist | Herself | Won |
| 2014 | 16th Mnet Asian Music Awards | Best OST | "Happy Me" (Reply 1994) | Nominated |
| 2020 | 17th Korean Music Awards | Best Dance & Electronic Album | Generasian | Won |
| 2020 | 17th Korean Music Awards | Album of the Year | Generasian | Nominated |
| 2020 | 17th Korean Music Awards | Best Dance & Electronic Song | "Sal-ki" | Won |
| 2020 | 17th Korean Music Awards | Song of the Year | "Sal-ki" | Nominated |
| 2020 | 17th Korean Music Awards | Artist of the Year | Herself | Nominated |
