= Kim Ye-lim (disambiguation) =

Kim Ye-lim or Kim Ye-rim (Korean: 김예림) may refer to:

- Kim Ye-lim (born 2003), South Korean figure skater
- Lim Kim (born 1994), South Korean singer for Togeworl, born Kim Ye-rim
- Yeri (singer) (born 1999), South Korean singer for Red Velvet, born Kim Ye-rim
