= Cherry Blossom Ending =

Single by Busker Busker

from the album Busker Busker 1st Album
- Released: March 29, 2012
- Genre: Alternative rock
- Length: 4:20
- Label: CJ E&M Music
- Songwriter: Jang Beom-jun

Busker Busker singles chronology
"Cherry Blossom Ending" (2012)	"If You Really Love Me" (2012)

Music video
- "Cherry Blossom Ending" on YouTube

"Cherry Blossom Ending" (Korean: 벚꽃 엔딩; RR: Beotkkot Ending) is a song by South Korean indie band Busker Busker, from their debut studio album Busker Busker 1st Album. The song was written by band member Jang Beom-jun and was released on March 29, 2012, by CJ E&M Music. The song is well known for re-entering the music charts every spring in South Korea, earning the nicknames "Spring Carol" and "Cherry Blossom Zombie". As of 2021, "Cherry Blossom Ending" has received over 8,000,000 digital downloads according to Gaon, making it the best-selling single in the country.

== Background and release ==
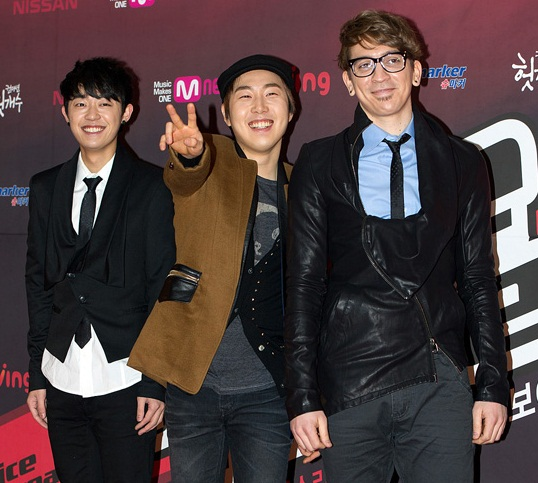
Busker Busker in 2012

Indie band Busker Busker became well known in 2011 through the third season of Mnet's talent show Superstar K. The band consisted of lead vocal and guitarist Jang Beom-jun, bassist Kim Hyung-tae, and drummer Brad Moore. They were the runner-up act in the competition and signed with Mnet's parent company CJ E&M Music. Their debut album, simply named Busker Busker 1st Album, was released on March 29, 2012. "Cherry Blossom Ending" served as the album's single and was accompanied by a music video (produced by Digipedi). Before this, Busker Busker had only released cover songs.

"Cherry Blossom Ending" was described as a "romantic ballad with an addictive rhythm". Lyrically, it expresses feelings of affection for a "special someone", and wanting to walk together in a street filled with cherry blossoms. Jang, who wrote the song, said, "It’s a song a guy would pen while thinking about the woman he wanted to walk under the cherry blossoms in spring with". It was first performed on March 26 at Busker Busker's debut showcase at Times Square in Yeongdeungpo. It was also promoted on various music shows, their own television show (Busker Busker Show) and their first concert titled "Youth Bus", held on May 5–6.

== Commercial performance ==
"Cherry Blossom Ending" was a commercial success, with over 2 million total downloads by May 2012. It was one of the top ten most downloaded songs for six consecutive weeks. It topped the Billboard K-pop Hot 100 two weeks in a row, on April 14 and 21, 2012. It topped the chart again a year later in April 2013, and peaked at number 5 in April 2014, the year the chart was discontinued. The song was number 7 on the year-end K-Pop Hot 100 in 2012, and number 21 at the end of 2013.

The song also performed well on the Gaon Digital Chart. It entered the chart at number 3, and topped the chart for the next two weeks. It was number 2 on the 2012 year-end chart, with about 3.4 million total downloads. The song peaked at number 2 in March 2013, and was number 14 on the 2013 year-end chart, with nearly 1.2 million downloads. It re-entered the chart in March 2014, peaking at number 8, and was number 111 on the 2014 year-end chart, selling over 700,000 downloads that year. In March 2015, it peaked at number 13, and was number 99 on the 2015 year-end chart, with over 640,000 downloads. In March 2016, it charted for the fifth consecutive year, peaking at number 16. That year, the Gaon Music Chart published a series of graphs showing that the song begins to re-appear in January every year, peaking the first week of March when the weather starts to get warmer.

In November 2015, music streaming site Mnet.com revealed that "Cherry Blossom Ending" was the most downloaded and streamed song in the past nine years (2006–2015). It has been known as "Cherry Blossom Pension" because songwriter and lead singer Jang Beom-jun was able to purchase a building in the affluent neighborhood of Daechi-dong with the song's royalties. Jang's earnings from the song totaled 4.6 billion won (US$3.8 million) as of March 2016. Its reappearance on the charts every year earned it the nicknames "Spring Carol" and "Cherry Blossom Zombie". "I Will Go to You Like the First Snow" which has re-entered music charts every winter has been described as the 'sadder, winter, immortal cousin' to "Cherry Blossom Ending". As of September 2018, "Cherry Blossom Ending" has sold over 7.5 million digital copies in South Korea, making it the best-selling single there since the Gaon Chart was established in 2010.

== Critical reception ==
Culture critic Kim Heon-sik said "Cherry Blossom Ending" was successful because it includes themes reminiscent of the spring season, such as "a cool breeze, cherry blossoms flying in the air and couples who hold hands at festivals for the flowers." He also said the contrast between its "cheerful melodies" and sad lyrics contributed to its success. Composer Brave Brothers said the song "brings out some nostalgia, and makes listeners comfortable", while pop culture critic Kang Tae-gyu said it became a hit because "people were reminded of the love that passed them by around this time last year". Park Jin-young praised the song on Twitter, saying the song was "so beautiful that it was sad" and it inspired him to spend the day making music.

Billboard staff included "Cherry Blossom Ending" in their list of the "20 Best K-pop Songs of 2012". They wrote: "Busker Busker brought something new and sweet this year with their smash debut hit. The indie band proved it was a sound to be heard above the din with its concoction of Beom-June Jang's charismatic vocals atop simple melodies."

== Accolades ==
The song was nominated for Song of the Year at the 2012 Mnet Asian Music Awards, and won the award for Best Band Performance. It also won Song of the Month (April) at the Cyworld Digital Music Awards and Song of the Year (April) at the Gaon Chart K-Pop Awards.

Awards
Year	Organization	Award	Result
2012	Cyworld Digital Music Awards	Song of the Month – April	Won
2012	Mnet Asian Music Awards	Song of the Year	Nominated
2012	Mnet Asian Music Awards	Best Band Performance	Won
2012	Gaon Chart K-Pop Awards	Song of the Month – April	Won

Music program wins
Program	Date	Ref.
M! Countdown (Mnet)	April 12, 2012	

== Charts ==
=== Weekly charts ===
Chart (2012)	Peak position
South Korea (Gaon)	1
South Korea (K-pop Hot 100)	1

=== Year-end charts ===
Chart (2012)	Position
South Korea (Gaon)	2
South Korea (K-pop Hot 100)	7
Chart (2013)	Position
South Korea (Gaon)	14
South Korea (K-pop Hot 100)	21
Chart (2014)	Position
South Korea (Gaon)	111
Chart (2015)	Position
South Korea (Gaon)	99

== Sales ==
Country	Sales
South Korea (Gaon)	8,000,000
