= Busker Busker 1st Album =

Studio album by Busker Busker
- Released: March 29, 2012
- Genre: Alternative rock
- Length: 35:00
- Language: Korean
- Label: CJ E&M Music

Busker Busker chronology
Busker Busker 1st Album (2012)	Busker Busker 1st Wrap Up Album (2012)

Singles from Busker Busker 1st Album
- 1. "Cherry Blossom Ending" Released: March 29, 2012

Busker Busker 1st Album (Korean: 버스커 버스커 1집; RR: Beoseukeo Beoseukeo Iljip) is the debut studio album by South Korean indie band Busker Busker. It was released by CJ E&M Music on March 29, 2012. All eleven tracks on the album are written by band member Jang Beom-jun. The album was a commercial success, topping the Gaon Album Chart and selling 100,000 physical copies in two months. The lead single, "Cherry Blossom Ending", was also a chart-topper, and re-enters the charts every spring. Due to the song's continued popularity, the album has also charted every year since release.

== Background, release and promotion ==
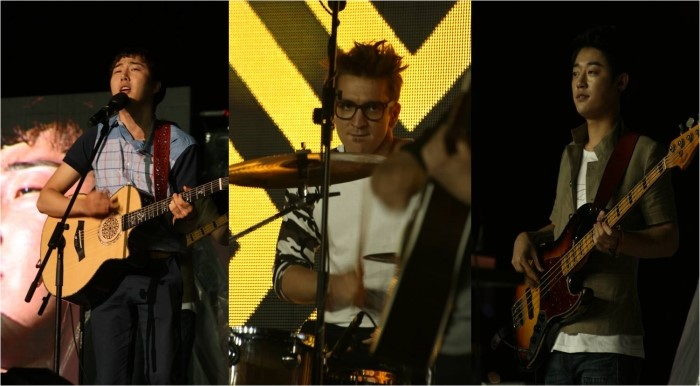
Busker Busker at Expo 2012 in Yeosu

Indie band Busker Busker was the runner-up of the televised talent show Superstar K3 in 2011. The band was from Cheonan and consisted of lead vocalist and guitarist Jang Beom-jun, bassist Kim Hyung-tae, and drummer Brad Moore. Moore, an American, was a professor at Sangmyung University before the show, and Jang and Kim were students majoring in animation. They were very popular during the show, and the songs they recorded made millions of dollars (USD), but they didn't get to keep any of the profits. After the show ended, they refused the standard record deal offered and accepted by the other contestants. They eventually accepted a six-month contract with CJ E&M Music on condition that they could write their own songs, play they own instruments, choose the production staff, and record in Cheonan instead of Seoul. Busker Busker 1st Album was recorded and mixed in only three weeks, and was released on March 29, 2012, in both CD and digital formats. A song from the album, "Ideal Type", was pre-released the week before on March 22. Before this, the band had only released cover songs.

Busker Busker's debut showcase was held on March 26 at Times Square in Yeongdeungpo. They performed "First Love", "Yeosu Night Sea" and "Cherry Blossom Ending" for the first time at the showcase. The album was then promoted with performances of "Cherry Blossom Ending" on South Korea's music shows. A one-hour special, Busker Busker Show, aired on Mnet on March 30. That same day, tickets went on sale for their first concert, with all 1,800 tickets selling out within five minutes. The concert, titled "Youth Bus", was held on May 5–6.

== Composition ==
All eleven songs on the album were written by Jang Beom-jun and are based on his personal experiences and emotions. They were originally written in an acoustic style, and were rearranged with strings, keyboards, drums and electric guitars for the album. Jang wrote "Yeosu Night Sea" one night after passing by a beach in Yeosu. Some of the songs, including "Spring Wind", "First Love" and "At the Entrance to the Alley", are about "painful but unforgettable" love. "Cherry Blossom Ending" is about wanting to walk in a street filled with cherry blossoms with the one you love. Jang said he got his inspiration from girls he dated and broke up with in the past, and he was also inspired by rock band Sister's Barbershop.

== Chart performance ==
The album was a commercial success, selling 100,000 physical copies and over 13 million digital songs in two months. It sold more than 12,000 copies by April 2, and became hard to find in stores, with employees saying they "didn't know the debut album of a new singer would sell so fast". It entered the Gaon Album Chart at number 3, and topped the chart the following week. It was number 11 on the year-end chart, with 136,234 total copies sold. Songs from the album were also successful digitally, especially "Cherry Blossom Ending", which topped the K-Pop Hot 100 for two consecutive weeks. All eleven tracks from the album charted in the top 23 of the Gaon Digital Chart the week of April 1, with six tracks in the top ten. The top three songs of the week were "Cherry Blossom Ending", "First Love" and "Yeosu Night Sea". All eleven tracks charted in the top 36 of the K-Pop Hot 100 the week of April 14, and six tracks made the top 10 the following week.

The album re-entered the Gaon Album Chart in 2013, peaking at number 10 the week of March 17, and charted at number 62 on the year-end chart, selling an additional 25,161 copies. It also charted the next two years in March, peaking at numbers 25 and 49, respectively. In March 2016, it charted for the fifth consecutive year, peaking at number 22. This is due to the popularity of "Cherry Blossom Ending", which re-enters the Gaon Digital Chart every spring.

== Reception and accolades ==
Singer-songwriter Yoon Do-hyun, singer Hahm Eun-jung and actor Jo Jung-suk all praised "Yeosu Night Sea", with Yoon saying it "sounds like a great song even when someone like me in his forties sings it". "Cherry Blossom Ending" was also praised by critics and musicians, and was one of Billboard's "20 Best K-pop Songs of 2012".

Busker Busker 1st Album won Album of the Year at the 2012 MelOn Music Awards. It was nominated for Album of the Year at the 2012 Mnet Asian Music Awards, and "Cherry Blossom Ending" won the award for Best Band Performance. The album also won Best Pop Album at the 2013 Korean Music Awards, while "Yeosu Night Sea" won Best Pop Song.

== Track listing ==
English-language song titles are from the K-Pop Hot 100.
No.	Title	Lyrics	Music	Arrangement	Length
1.	"Spring Wind" (봄바람; Bombaram)		Jang Beom-jun; Kim Ji-su		1:48
2.	"First Love" (첫사랑; Cheotsarang)	Jang Beom-jun; Jang Gi-jun	Jang Beom-jun	Bae Yeong-jun	3:31
3.	"Yeosu Night Sea" (여수 밤바다; Yeosu Bambada)	Jang Beom-jun	Jang Beom-jun	Jang Beom-jun; Bae Yeong-jun; Kim Ji-su	4:41
4.	"Cherry Blossom Ending" (벚꽃 엔딩; Beotkkot Ending)	Jang Beom-jun	Jang Beom-jun	Jang Beom-jun; Kim Ji-su	4:22
5.	"Ideal Type" (이상형; Isanghyeong)	Jang Beom-jun; Hwang Yong-ha	Jang Beom-jun	Jang Beom-jun; Bae Yeong-jun	3:25
6.	"Loneliness Amplifier" (외로움증폭장치; Oeroum Jeungpokjangchi)	Jang Beom-jun	Jang Beom-jun	Jang Beom-jun; Bae Yeong-jun	3:05
7.	"An Alley Way" (골목길; Golmok-kil (Note: Also translated as "An Alley"))		Jang Beom-jun	Jang Beom-jun; Bae Yeong-jun	0:34
8.	"At the Entrance to the Alley" (골목길 어귀에서; Golmok-kil Eogwieseo)	Jang Beom-jun	Jang Beom-jun	Jang Beom-jun; Bae Yeong-jun	3:18
9.	"Calling You" (전활 거네; Jeonhwal Geone)	Jang Beom-jun	Jang Beom-jun	Jang Beom-jun; Bae Yeong-jun; Kim Ji-su	3:13
10.	"The Flowers" (꽃송이가; Kkotsong-iga (Note: Also translated as "Bloom"))	Jang Beom-jun	Jang Beom-jun	Jang Beom-jun; Bae Yeong-jun; Gi Hyeon-seok	3:24
11.	"Perfume" (향수; Hyangsu)	Jang Beom-jun	Jang Beom-jun	Jang Beom-jun; Bae Yeong-jun	3:39
Total length:					35:00

== Charts ==
=== Weekly charts ===
Chart (2012)	Peak position
South Korea (Gaon Album Chart)	1

Chart (2013)	Peak position
South Korea (Gaon Album Chart)	10

Chart (2014)	Peak position
South Korea (Gaon Album Chart)	25

Chart (2015)	Peak position
South Korea (Gaon Album Chart)	49

Chart (2016)	Peak position
South Korea (Gaon Album Chart)	22

=== Year-end charts ===
Chart (2012)	Peak position
South Korea (Gaon Album Chart)	11

Chart (2013)	Peak position
South Korea (Gaon Album Chart)	62
