= Generasian =

EP by Lim Kim
- Released: October 15, 2019
- Recorded: 2016–2019
- Genre: Electronica
- Length: 20:53
- Languages: Korean, English
- Labels: Lim Company; Universal Music Korea
- Producers: Lim Kim; No Identity

Lim Kim chronology
Simple Mind (2015)	Generasian (2019)

Singles from Generasian
- 1. ""Yellow" on YouTube" Released: October 15, 2019; 2. ""Mong" on YouTube" Released: February 28, 2020

Generasian is the fourth extended play by South Korean singer Lim Kim. Released on October 15, 2019, by Universal Music Korea and Lim Company, the extended play is Kim's first independent release since Simple Mind (2015), and subsequently her first since she left Mystic Entertainment in 2016. A dominant electronica record with worldbeat incorporation, Generasian finds Kim "exploring and centering" her identity as an Asian woman, further growing away from her previous musical direction. Preceded by a non-album single "SAL-KI" on May 24, 2019, the extended play spawned two singles, "Yellow" on October 15, and "Mong" on February 28, 2020.

Upon its release, Generasian received critical acclaim for showcasing Kim's artistic growth and the extended play's Oriental influence. Though it remained uncharted, both the extended play and "SAL-KI" earned the singer a total of five nominations at the 2020 Korean Music Awards, tying with Baek Ye-rin and Jannabi as the most nominated acts of the year. The extended play eventually won the award of Best Dance & Electronic Album, while "SAL-KI" won the award of Best Dance & Electronic Song.

== Background and release ==
Generasion is Lim Kim's first EP released after her last album Simple Mind, released in April 2015. October 16, 2019, the music video for the first title track "Yellow" was released. On February 28, 2020, the "Mong" music video was released on YouTube.

== Track listing ==
All tracks are written by Lim Kim. All tracks are produced by Lim Kim and No Identity.

Digital
No.	Title	Length
1.	"민족요 (Entrance)"	3:13
2.	"Yellow"	3:02
3.	"Mong"	4:43
4.	"Digital Khan"	3:54
5.	"Yo-Soul"	2:57
6.	"민족요 (Exit)"	3:16
Total length:		21:05

== Awards and nominations ==
Year	Award	Category	Nominated work	Result	Ref.
2020	17th Korean Music Awards	Best Dance & Electronic Album	Generasian	Won	
2020	17th Korean Music Awards	Album of the Year	Generasian	Nominated	

== Release history ==
Region	Date	Format	Label	Ref.
Worldwide	October 15, 2019	Streaming, digital download	Universal Music Korea, Lim Company	
