= Togeworl =

South Korean folk pop duo

Togeworl 투개월
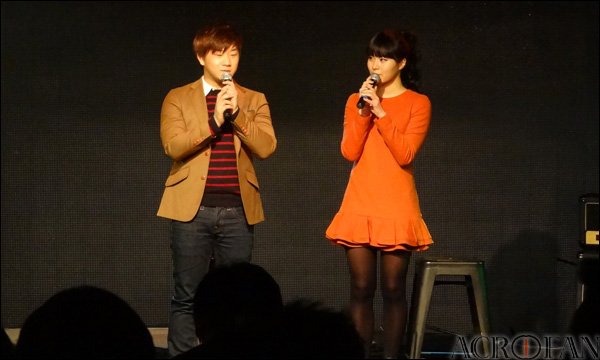
- Togeworl performing in 2012. (from left): Denny Do, Lim Kim

Background information
- Also known as: Two Months
- Origin: South Korea
- Genres: K-pop, folk rock
- Years active: 2011–present (hiatus)
- Label: Mystic89
- Members: Lim Kim; Denny Do
- Website: Official Label Site at archive.org

Korean name
- Hangul: 투개월
- RR: Tugaewol
- MR: T'ugaewŏl

Togeworl (Korean: 투개월, also known as Two Months) is a South Korean folk pop duo, that was formed in New Jersey in 2011. They are known for debuting and competing in the Korean singing competition Superstar K3, placing third. The duo went on an indefinite hiatus in 2013, with vocalist Lim Kim subsequently debuting as a solo musician.

== Biography ==
The duo consists of vocalist Lim Kim (Korean name: Kim Ye-rim; 김예림) and vocalist/guitarist Denny Do (Korean name: Do Dae-yoon; 도대윤). Both Do and Kim were born in South Korea; however, the pair met in high school when they both attended Leonia High School in Leonia, New Jersey, United States. After hearing that Do was a talented guitarist, Kim approached Do to audition together for the New York City auditions of the South Korean singing competition Superstar K3. He agreed, and they auditioned together as Togeworl, which translates to "two months" in Korean. They chose the name to symbolize that they had auditioned together after only knowing each other for two months. They auditioned with the songs "Virtual Insanity" by Jamiroquai and "Romantico" by Tete.

After passing the audition, the duo flew to Seoul to compete in the show to compete. Eventually, they were chosen to be mentored on the show by Korean singer-songwriter Yoon Jong Shin. During the competition, the duo covered many artists such as The Classic's "Fox," Lady Gaga's "Poker Face" and "Brown City" Brown Eyed Soul. "Fox" charted at number two on the Billboard Korea K-Pop Hot 100 and number three on the Gaon Singles Chart, selling more than 2,000,000 music downloads in 2011. Togeworl finished third overall in the competition, behind Ulala Session and Busker Busker.

Following the competition, Kim and Do remained in South Korea, where they continued to receive musical training and signed a contract with Mystic89, the label owned by Yoon Jong Shin. They released their first song in February 2012, on the soundtrack for the TVN variety show The Romantic.

Togeworl planned to debut properly in 2013, however, Do Dae-yoon had to return to the United States, due to issues with graduating high school. Because of this, it was decided that Lim Kim should debut as a solo artist before Togeworl reunited.

On May 24, 2013, Togeworl released a single called "Number 1," celebrating their second anniversary. In June, Lim Kim debuted as a solo musician, and her song "All Right" reached number two on Gaon's singles chart. She released a full-length album, Goodbye 20, in November 2013.

== Discography ==
=== Singles ===
Year	Title	Peak positions		Sales	Album
Year	Title	KOR	Hot 100 K-Pop	Sales	Album
2012	"The Romantic"	16	14	KOR (DL): 718,000	The Romantic OST Part 1
2013	"Number 1"	6	5	KOR (DL): 625,000	Non-album singles
2014	"Talk to Me" (톡투미)	12	17	KOR (DL): 170,000	Non-album singles
"—" denotes releases that did not chart or were not released in that region.

==== Other charted songs ====
Year	Title	Peak positions		Album
Year	Title	KOR	Hot 100 K-Pop	Album
2011	"Fox" (여우야) (The Classic cover)	2	2	SuperstarK 3 Top11 Part 1
2011	"Poker Face" (Lady Gaga cover)	3	8	SuperstarK 3 Top11 Part 2
2011	"Brown City" (Brown Eyed Soul cover)	5	7	SuperstarK 3 Top11 Part 3
2011	"Snail" (달팽이) (Panic cover)	11	38	SuperstarK 3 Top11 Part 4
2011	"What Do You Think" (니 생각) (Yoon Jong-shin cover)	11	46	SuperstarK 3 Top11 Part 5
2011	"Romantico" (Tete cover)	13	15	SuperstarK 3 Top11 Part 6
2011	"Juliette" (Busker Busker and Togeworl; Shinee cover)	27	29	Next 11
