= Jang Beom-june =

South Korean singer-songwriter (born 1989)

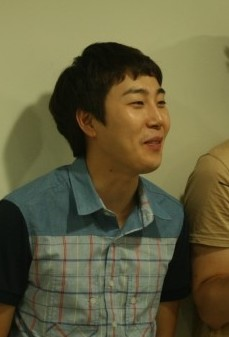
- Jang in 2012

Background information
- Born: May 16, 1989 (age 37)
- Origin: South Korea
- Genre: Indie rock
- Occupation: Singer-songwriter
- Instrument: Guitar
- Years active: 2011–present

Korean name
- Hangul: 장범준
- Hanja: 張凡俊
- RR: Jang Beomjun
- MR: Chang Pŏmjun

Jang Beom-june (Korean: 장범준; born May 16, 1989) is a South Korean singer-songwriter. He debuted in 2011 on the music audition television program Superstar K 3 as a member of the indie rock trio Busker Busker. He released his self-titled, first solo album in 2014, which topped real-time music charts and included the No.1 hit single, "Difficult Woman." His second album, released in 2016, was similarly successful and spawned the No.1 hit, "Fallen In Love (Only With You)." After being discharged from his mandatory military service in 2018, Jang released his third album in 2019, which included the hit single "Every Moment With You." Later in 2019, his song, "Your Shampoo Scent In The Flowers," from the soundtrack to the television series Be Melodramatic, reached No. 1 on South Korean music charts.

== Personal life ==
Jang is married to actress Song Ji-soo. The couple has a daughter named Jang Jo-ah and a son named Jang Ha-da. The children have appeared on the South Korean variety show The Return of Superman alongside their father.

== Discography ==
=== Studio albums ===
Title	Album details	Peak chart positions	Sales
Title	Album details	KOR	Sales
Jang Beom June 1st Album	Released: August 19, 2014; Label: Busker Busker; Formats: CD, digital download	4	KOR: 12,732
Jang Beom June 2nd Album	Released: March 25, 2016; Label: Busker Busker; Formats: CD, digital download	4	KOR: 10,000
Jang Beom June 3rd Album	Released: March 21, 2019; Label: Busker Busker; Formats: CD, digital download	10	KOR: 5,856
Jang Beom June 4th Album (History of Nerds)	Released: March 20, 2025; Label: Pink Romantic Acoustic Shuffle; Formats: CD, digital download	30	KOR: 3,963

=== Extended plays ===
Title	Album details	Peak chart positions	Sales
Title	Album details	KOR	Sales
Buscar Buscar	Released: July 20, 2025; Label: Pink Romantic Acoustic Shuffle; Formats: CD, digital download, streaming	47	KOR: 1,891

=== Singles ===
Title	Year	Peak chart positions	Sales	Certifications	Album
Title	Year	KOR	Sales	Certifications	Album
"Difficult Woman" (어려운 여자)	2014	1	KOR: 525,727	—N/a	Jang Beom June 1st Album
"No Words Can Describe My Love for You" (사랑에 어떤 말로도 (사말로도))	2014	14	KOR: 160,509	—N/a	Jang Beom June 1st Album
"To the Rain" (빗속으로)	2016	7	KOR: 383,620	—N/a	Jang Beom June 2nd Album
"Falling in Love Immediately" (사랑에 빠져요 (금세 사랑에 빠지는))	2016	19	KOR: 284,828	—N/a	Jang Beom June 2nd Album
"Spend Christmas with Me" (집에 가지 않는 연인들)	2016	46	KOR: 71,577	—N/a	Non-album single
"Every Moment with You" (당신과는 천천히)	2019	2	—N/a		Jang Beom June 3rd Album
"Karaoke" (노래방에서)	2019	6	—N/a	KCMA: Platinum (Streaming)	Jang Beom June 3rd Album
"Can't Sleep" (잠이 오질 않네요)	2020	3	—N/a	KCMA: Platinum (Streaming)	Non-album single
"As You Wish" (추적이는 여름 비가 되어)	2021	22	—N/a		Jang Beom June Single
"Silver Pantheon" (실버판테온)	2021	131	—N/a		Jang Beom June Single
"Go Back" (고백)	2021	32	—N/a		Non-album single
"Silent Rainfalls" (소리 없는 비가 내린다)	2025	TBA	—N/a		Jang Beom June 4th Album (History of Nerds)

=== Soundtrack appearances ===
Title	Year	Peak chart positions	Sales	Certifications	Album
Title	Year	KOR	Sales	Certifications	Album
"Reminisce" (회상)	2016	9	KOR: 401,791	—N/a	Signal OST
"Reaching Hand" (손 닿으면)	2019	—	—N/a		Search: WWW OST
"Your Shampoo Scent in the Flowers" (흔들리는 꽃들 속에서 네 샴푸향이 느껴진거야)	2019	1	—N/a	KCMA: 3× Platinum (Note: Certification for streaming)	Be Melodramatic OST
"I Like You" (나는 너 좋아)	2021	36	—N/a		Hospital Playlist Season 2 OST
"I Will Make You Happy" (행복하게 해줄게)	2022	98	—N/a		Our Beloved Summer OST

=== Other charted songs ===
Title	Year	Peak chart positions	Sales	Album
Title	Year	KOR	Sales	Album
"The One I Love" (사랑이란 말이 어울리는 사람 (사말어사))	2014	3	KOR: 390,603	Jang Beom June 1st Album
"Scarlet Road" (주홍빛 거리)	2014	9	KOR: 172,960	Jang Beom June 1st Album
"Sinpung Station Exit No. 2 Blues" (신풍역 2번 출구 블루스)	2014	21	KOR: 139,883	Jang Beom June 1st Album
"Crush" (무서운 짝사랑)	2014	20	KOR: 145,695	Jang Beom June 1st Album
"Fallen Leaves Ending" (낙엽 엔딩)	2014	6	KOR: 213,336	Jang Beom June 1st Album
"I Feel You In My Heart" (내 마음이 그대가 되어 (내마그))	2014	7	KOR: 188,220	Jang Beom June 1st Album
"Fallen in Love (Only with You)" (사랑에 빠졌죠 (당신만이))	2016	1	KOR: 823,415	Jang Beom June 2nd Album
"She Smiles" (그녀가 웃었죠)	2016	27	KOR: 146,463	Jang Beom June 2nd Album
"I Should Leave You" (떠나야만해)	2016	28	KOR: 143,391	Jang Beom June 2nd Album
"Spring Rain" (봄비)	2016	15	KOR: 320,185	Jang Beom June 2nd Album
"Without You By My Side (A New Song Called Wedding March)" (그녀가 곁에 없다면 (결혼 행진곡을 활용한 신곡))	2016	5	KOR: 470,490	Jang Beom June 2nd Album
"Teasing Girl" (애태우는 여자)	2016	35	KOR: 121,508	Jang Beom June 2nd Album
"To Hongdae" (홍대와 건대 사이)	2016	26	KOR: 234,085	Jang Beom June 2nd Album
"A New Song Called Lullaby" (자장가를 활용한 신곡)	2016	40	KOR: 114,739	Jang Beom June 2nd Album
"Kiss" (키스)	2016	47	KOR: 112,298	Jang Beom June 2nd Album
"Cute Girl" (귀여운 여자)	2016	43	KOR: 115,882	Jang Beom June 2nd Album
"Ulala" (울랄라)	2016	53	KOR: 103,466	Jang Beom June 2nd Album
"Cigarette" (담배)	2016	51	KOR: 110,253	Jang Beom June 2nd Album
"I'm Erasing the Night" (밤을 지워가네)	2016	41	KOR: 117,102	Jang Beom June 2nd Album
"Ilsan" (일산으로)	2019	28	—N/a	Jang Beom June 3rd Album
"Always" (그모습 그대로)	2019	34	—N/a	Jang Beom June 3rd Album
"Phone Call to Mom" (엄마 용돈 좀 보내주세요)	2019	67	—N/a	Jang Beom June 3rd Album
"This Night" (이밤)	2019	54	—N/a	Jang Beom June 3rd Album
"Why" (왜)	2019	66	—N/a	Jang Beom June 3rd Album
"Imagination" (상상속에서)	2019	84	—N/a	Jang Beom June 3rd Album

== Filmography ==
=== Television ===
Year	Title	Role	Note	Ref.
2011	Superstar K 3	Himself	Contestant as member of Busker Busker	
2016	Infinite Challenge	Himself	Contestant who worked with Park Myung Soo during the Wedding Singers Special	
2019	The Return of Superman	Himself	Cast member alongside his two children	
2020	Hangout with Yoo	Himself	A member of indoor concert	

== Awards and nominations ==
Year	Award	Category	Nominated work	Result	Ref.
2016	Mnet Asian Music Awards	Best OST	"Reminisce"	Nominated	
2016	Mnet Asian Music Awards	Best Vocal Performance (Male Solo)	"Fallen In Love (Only With You)"	Nominated	
2017	Gaon Chart Music Awards	Singer of the Year (March)	"Fallen In Love (Only With You)"	Won	
2019	Melon Music Awards	Top 10 Artist	—N/a	Won	
2019	Mnet Asian Music Awards	Best OST	"Your Shampoo Scent In The Flowers"	Nominated	
2019	Mnet Asian Music Awards	Best Vocal Performance (Solo)	"Karaoke"	Nominated	
