= Busker Busker =

South Korean indie pop band

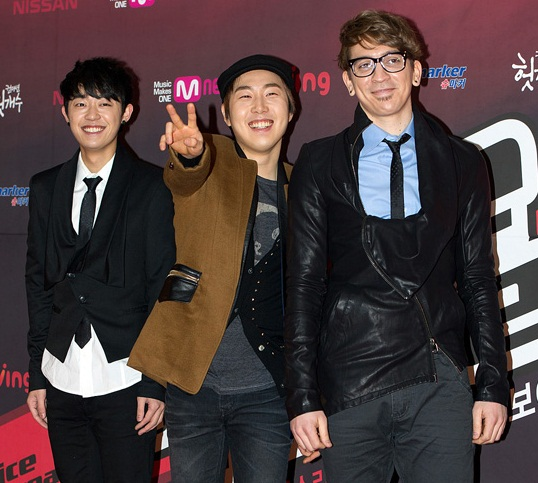
- Busker Busker in February 2012

Background information
- Origin: Cheonan, South Korea
- Genres: Pop rock; soft rock; indie rock; folk rock
- Years active: 2011–2013 (Note: Indefinite hiatus)
- Labels: Chungchun Music, CJ E&M Music
- Past members: Jang Beom-june; Kim Hyung-tae; Brad Moore

Busker Busker (Korean: 버스커 버스커) is a South Korean indie band who rose to fame through their runner-up performance in the South Korean music audition television program Superstar K3 on Mnet. The band consists of guitarist and vocalist Jang Beom-june, bassist Kim Hyung-tae and drummer Brad Moore.

Busker Busker 1st Album and its single "Cherry Blossom Ending" were released in March 2012. The band's six-month contract with CJ E&M came to an end in 2012, and they then joined Chungchun Music, releasing Busker Busker 2nd Album in September 2013. In December 2013, they announced they had temporarily disbanded yet the members have repeatedly hinted at a reunion.

== Career ==
=== Before Superstar K3 ===
The group Busker Busker was founded by the band's guitarist and lead singer, Jang Beom-jun (장범준). His vision was to create a busking art group that focused on street performances and sought to bring an artistic cultural presence to the streets of Korea. His vision included all art mediums, not just music, and he sought to create festivals that would showcase the budding talents of local artists. Members of Busker Busker included university students, mostly from the Cheonan campus of Sangmyung University. Prior to Brad Moore joining the band, the band's name was Pinky Pinky and was only a subset of the total Busker Busker group. The band's drummer had to leave the band in order to keep his compulsory commitment to join the South Korean Army.

At that time, Jang and Kim Hyung-tae (김형태) were both university students at Sangmyung University where Moore also worked as an English instructor. They met and the three became the new bandmates, renaming the band Busker Busker. However, the band was still a loose formation, as many members of the Busker Busker group would rotate in and out of band performances. The Busker Busker group set up multiple performances in the summer of 2011 in a local Cheonan park, which is where the Busker Busker band's fame began to escalate. At the same time, Jang, Kim, and Moore were participating in the Superstar K3 auditions as a trio, because they were the only members of the band that were able to participate in the process. After their auditions aired on TV, the band solidified as a trio. Moore stood out as he is Caucasian and spoke only a little Korean.

=== Participation in Superstar K3 ===
Busker Busker auditioned for the third season of the survival audition show Superstar K. They were eliminated after performing the song "Juliette" with another auditioning group, Togeworl. However, despite only making it to the Top 48 of tryout contestants, it happened that Yeri Band, originally in the Top 10, dropped out. As a result, Busker Busker, along with another band (Haze), were given a second chance to appear on the TV show and signed on to be a part of the show's new Top 11. Busker Busker's first song on the show, "Tokyo Girl", was extremely popular and the band survived the first elimination round as well as achieved their first chart-topping release. After repeating their previous success, the band managed to avoid elimination. Eventually, only the last three groups remained which included Busker Busker, Ulala Session, and Togeworl. Going into the second-to-last show, the three groups were asked to honor a promise they had made earlier on the show, that if they were to end up in the Top 3 of Superstar K3, they would strip dance. They performed in Hongdae in front of a group of onlookers. After the live performances of the second-to-last show, and the live voting was completed, it was determined that Busker Busker and Ulala Session were to be the final two groups remaining. The last episode of the season was the final competition between the two remaining groups, with Ulala Session taking the top place.

=== Busker Busker 1st Album and Busker Busker 1st Wrap Up Album (2012) ===
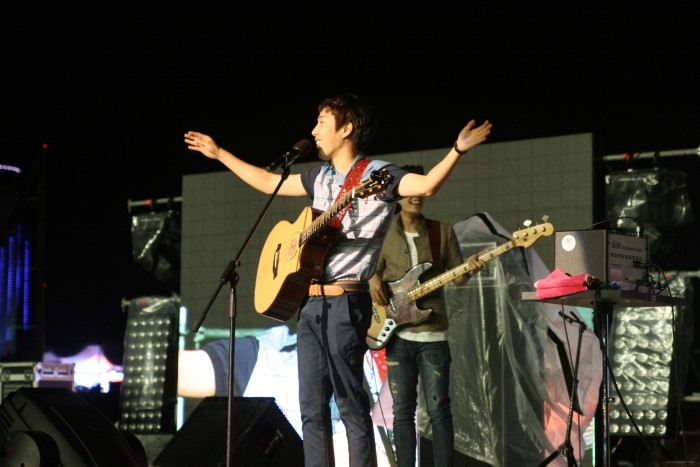
The band at the Expo 2012

After the completion of Superstar K3, the group had been highly elusive and took time off from public activities to determine their music direction, in part due to the difficulty the band had practicing. In addition, while the band was scheduled to take part in a Superstar K3 Top 11 Concert Tour, Moore returned home for the Christmas holidays. As a result, the band temporarily found a new drummer for the concert while Moore traveled to America. After Moore returned on January 12, the band resumed practices in order to prepare and record their first album as a separate entity from the Superstar K3 TV show.

On March 29, 2012, Busker Busker released their first album, which was simply titled Busker Busker 1st Album. All songs on the album were written by Jang, including the lead single "Cherry Blossom Ending". The album quickly became a national sensation, with every song on the album entering the K-Pop Hot 100 and Gaon Digital Chart. The album sold over 50,000 copies during its first three weeks. On June 21, Busker Busker released Busker Busker 1st Wrap Up Album, which contained music not included in their first album. Some of the songs on this wrap up album were recorded during the first album's preparation, but they were left out as they didn't coincide with the album's spring theme. After their "Youth Bus" encore concerts on June 22 and 23, they ceased promotional activities. At the end of the year their first album sold over 136,000 copies. After their six-month contract with CJ E&M Music ended, they joined Chungchun Music.

In March 2013, "Cherry Blossom Ending" was called the "carol of spring" as it topped the music charts a year after its release. It charted for the ninth consecutive year in March 2020.

=== Busker Busker 2nd Album and "indefinite" hiatus ===
Following the great success of their first album, Busker Busker released a second album on September 25, 2013. "Love, At First" served as the album's lead single. After promotion ended for their second album, Busker Busker announced they were temporarily disbanding, putting the band on an indefinite hiatus. They have not been active since. Jang debuted as a solo artist in 2014, Kim started the media art studio "PigRabbit" and Moore focused on his Drum-DJ band "Brad Project".

== Members ==
- Jang Beom-june – lead vocals, guitar
- Kim Hyung-tae – bass guitar, backing vocals
- Brad Moore – drums, percussion

== Discography ==
=== Studio albums ===
Title	Album details	Peak chart positions	Sales
Title	Album details	KOR	Sales
Busker Busker 1st Album	Released: March 29, 2012; Label: CJ E&M Music; Format: CD, LP, digital download	1	KOR: 179,324
Busker Busker 2nd Album	Released: September 25, 2013; Label: Chungchun Music Inc.; Format: CD, digital download	1	KOR: 76,041

=== Extended plays ===
Title	Album details	Peak chart positions	Sales
Title	Album details	KOR	Sales
Busker Busker 1st Wrap Up Album	Released: June 21, 2012; Label: CJ E&M Music; Format: CD, digital download	1	KOR: 50,595

=== Singles ===
List of songs, with selected chart positions
Title	Year	Peak chart positions		Sales	Album
Title	Year	KOR	KOR Hot	Sales	Album
"I Believe"	2011	7	14	KOR: 1,222,720	Superstar K3 Top 11 Part 7
"People in Seoul" (Note: English-language song titles are from the K-pop Hot 100) (서울사람들)	2011	3	3	KOR: 2,214,649	Non-album single
"Neo-ege Juneun Seonmul" (너에게 주는 선물) (with Superstar K3)	2011	41	—	KOR: 245,455	Next 11: Superstar K Season 3 Top 11
"Cherry Blossom Ending" (벚꽃 엔딩)	2012	1	1	KOR: 8,000,000	Busker Busker 1st Album
"If You Really Love Me" (정말로 사랑한다면)	2012	1	1	KOR: 3,132,393	Busker Busker 1st Wrap Up Album
"Love, at First" (처음엔 사랑이란게)	2013	1	1	KOR: 1,844,959	Busker Busker 2nd Album
"—" denotes releases that did not chart or were not released in that region.

=== Other charted songs ===
List of songs, with selected chart positions
Title	Year	Peak chart positions		Sales	Album
Title	Year	KOR	KOR Hot	Sales	Album
"Tokyo Girl" (Note: Also translated as "Dream Girl") (동경소녀)	2011	1	1	KOR: 3,354,585	Superstar K3 Top 11 Part 1
"Livin' la Vida Loca"	2011	17	35		Superstar K3 Top 11 Part 2
"The Station" (Note: Also translated as "Bus Stop") (정류장)	2011	6	10		Superstar K3 Top 11 Part 3
"Finally Met You" (Note: Also translated as "Met You by Chance") (어쩌다 마주친 그대)	2011	8	15		Superstar K3 Top 11 Part 4
"Makgeolli-Na" (Note: The literal meaning is "Thick Rice Wine") (막걸리나)	2011	2	3		Superstar K3 Top 11 Part 5
"You are Different" (Note: Also translated as "You're Different") (그댄 달라요)	2011	11	14		Superstar K3 Top 11 Part 6
"Juliette" (줄리엣) (with Togeworl)	2011	28	29		Next 11: Superstar K Season 3 Top 11
"Spring Wind" (봄바람)	2012	18	22		Busker Busker 1st Album
"First Love" (첫사랑)	2012	2	4		Busker Busker 1st Album
"Yeosu Night Sea" (여수 밤바다)	2012	3	5	KOR: 3,756,755	Busker Busker 1st Album
"Ideal Type" (이상형)	2012	7	9		Busker Busker 1st Album
"Loneliness Amplifier" (외로움증폭장치)	2012	6	8		Busker Busker 1st Album
"An Alley Way" (Note: Also translated as "An Alley") (골목길)	2012	23	36		Busker Busker 1st Album
"At the Entrance to the Alley" (골목길 어귀에서)	2012	15	23		Busker Busker 1st Album
"Calling You" (전활 거네)	2012	11	16		Busker Busker 1st Album
"The Flowers" (Note: Also translated as "Bloom") (꽃송이가)	2012	8	10		Busker Busker 1st Album
"Perfume" (향수)	2012	13	24		Busker Busker 1st Album
"It's Hard to Face You" (Note: Also translated as "It's So Hard to Face You") (그댈 마주하는건 힘들어 (그마힘))	2012	3	4		Busker Busker 1st Wrap Up Album
"Neon Sign" (네온사인)	2012	8	9		Busker Busker 1st Wrap Up Album
"Showers" (Note: Also translated as "A Shower") (소나기 (주르르루))	2012	6	6		Busker Busker 1st Wrap Up Album
"Please Wait" (Note: Also translated as "Please Wait for Me") (기다려주세요)	2012	12	12		Busker Busker 1st Wrap Up Album
"Autumn Night" (가을밤)	2013	9	9		Busker Busker 2nd Album
"Too Much Regret" (잘할 걸)	2013	2	2		Busker Busker 2nd Album
"Love Is Timing" (사랑은 타이밍)	2013	3	3		Busker Busker 2nd Album
"Cool Girl" (시원한 여자)	2013	5	7		Busker Busker 2nd Album
"Your Lips" (Note: Also translated as "Lip") (그대 입술이) (with Chae Ji-yeon of Putput)	2013	4	4		Busker Busker 2nd Album
"Juliette" (줄리엣)	2013	8	11		Busker Busker 2nd Album
"Beautiful Age" (아름다운 나이)	2013	7	8		Busker Busker 2nd Album
"Night" (밤)	2013	6	6		Busker Busker 2nd Album

=== Music videos ===
List of music videos, showing year released with directors
Title	Year	Director(s)
"Cherry Blossom Ending"	2012	Digipedi
"If You Really Love Me"	2012	M-Media Works
"Love, At First"	2013	Unknown

== Awards ==
Year	Awards
2011	Cyworld Digital Music Awards: Rookie of the Month (October) ("Tokyo Girl"); Cyworld Digital Music Awards: Song of the Month (October) ("Tokyo Girl")
2012	Cyworld Digital Music Awards: Song of the Month (April) ("Cherry Blossom Ending"); 6th Mnet 20's Choice Awards: 20's Online Music Award; 14th Mnet Asian Music Awards: Best New Male Artist; 14th Mnet Asian Music Awards: Best Band Performance ("Cherry Blossom Ending"); 4th Melon Music Awards: Album of The Year (Daesang) (Busker Busker 1st Album); 4th Melon Music Awards: 2012 Top 10
2013	2nd Gaon Chart K-Pop Awards: Song of The Year (April) ("Cherry Blossom Ending"); 10th Korean Music Awards: Best Pop Album (Busker Busker 1st Album); 10th Korean Music Awards: Best Pop Song ("Yeosu Night Sea"); 10th Korean Music Awards: Netizens' Choice Music Group of the Year; 5th Melon Music Awards: 2013 Top 10; 5th Melon Music Awards: Album of The Year (Daesang) (Busker Busker 2nd Album); 15th Mnet Asian Music Awards: Best Band Performance ("Love, At First")

== Notes ==
Awards and achievements
Preceded by Huh Gak	14th Mnet Asian Music Awards - Best New Male Artist; 2012	Succeeded by Roy Kim
Preceded by CN Blue	14th Mnet Asian Music Awards - Best Band Performance; 2012–2013	Succeeded by CN Blue
