= Superstar K 3 =

- Season 3
- Promotional poster
- Hosted by: Kim Sung-joo; Ahn Hye-Kyung
- Judges: Lee Seung-chul; Yoon Mi-rae; Yoon Jong-shin
- Winner: Ulala Session
- Runner-up: Busker Busker
- Finals venue: Kyung Hee University Grand Peace Hall

Release
- Original network: Mnet; KM
- Original release: August 11 – November 11, 2011

Season chronology
- ← Previous; Superstar K 2 Next → Superstar K 4

Superstar K 4 (Korean: 슈퍼스타 3) is the third season of the South Korean television talent show series Superstar K, broadcast by M.net. The theme song for this season, "Fly" is written by producer Park Keun-tae and sung by Super Junior-K.R.Y. It was released on 14 April 2011 and debuted at the preliminary round in Busan on 24 April till the final show in November. It was also the first season within the show's three-year history to allow group acts to compete.

== Broadcasting time ==
=== Broadcast ===
| Network | Broadcasting Dates | Broadcasting Time |
|---|---|---|
| Mnet · KM | August 12, 2011 – November 11, 2011 | Every Friday at 11:00 PM (KST). |

== TOP 11 ==
- Originally to consist of the TOP 10 finalists; however, the team "Yery Band" were subsequently removed from the show and were replaced by the contestants "Haze" and "Busker Busker". This meant that the final line-up became the TOP 11.

| Name/Group Name | Age | Place of Audition | Profession | Final Standing |
|---|---|---|---|---|
| Ulala Session (울랄라 세션) (임윤택, 박광선, 박승일, 김명훈) | 32, 22, 31, 29 | Daejeon | Choreographer, Self-Employed, 의류업, Amateur Photographer | Winner |
| Togeworl (투 개월, Two Months) (김예림, 도대윤) | 18, 19 | United States of America | Student, Student | TOP 3 |
| Yery Band (예리밴드) (Note: Complained about the staff and editors of Superstar K3, and were forced to give up their entry in the Top 10.) (한승오, 유예리, 김하늘, 김선재) | 40, 25, 27, 27 | Daejeon | Musician & Music Studio Operator, Vocal Instructor | Voluntarily Evicted |
| Min Hoon Ki (민훈기) | 23 | Incheon | College Student | TOP 11 |
| Kim Do Hyun (김도현) | 19 | Busan | High School Student, Ssireum Athlete | TOP 5 |
| Chris Golightly (크리스 골라이틀리) (Note: Prior to starring in Superstar K3, Chris had appeared in the TOP 24 for Season 9 of American Idol. However, it was stated that Chris had a music contract with a company which ran contrast with the American Idol's rules which disallowed the existence of a contract during the audition period - and was thus disqualified from the competition.) | 29 | Seoul B | Composer and Singer | TOP 7 |
| Christina Love Lee (크리스티나 러브 리) | 26 | United States of America | Music Therapist | TOP 4 |
| Lee Gun Yul (이건율) | 23 | Incheon | College Student | TOP 9 |
| Lee Jung Ah (이정아) | 25 | Seoul A | College Student | TOP 9 |
| Shin Ji Soo (신지수) | 19 | Incheon | High School Student | TOP 7 |
| Haze (헤이즈) (Note: Passed the auditions, and filled the vacant position left by the abstaining of Yery Band.) (신동주, 이승준, 송석민, 정재현, 변종필) | 28, 27, 28, 28, 25 | Daegu | College Student, College Student, Musician, College Graduate, College Student | TOP 11 |
| Busker Busker (버스커 버스커) (장범준, 김형태, 브래드(Brad Moore)) | 23, 21, 28 | Daejeon | College Student, College Student, University Professor | Runner-Up |

| Order | Episode 8 | Episode 9 | Episode 10 | Episode 11 | Episode 12 | Episode 13 | Episode 14 |
|---|---|---|---|---|---|---|---|
| 1 | Haze | Christina | Chris | Ulala Session | Togeworl | Busker Busker | Busker Busker |
| 2 | Min Hoon Ki | Lee Gun Yul | Kim Do Hyun | Busker Busker | Christina | Togeworl | Ulala Session |
| 3 | Christina | Lee Jung Ah | Busker Busker | Christina | Busker Busker | Ulala Session | |
| 4 | Lee Gun Yul | Chris | Shin Ji Soo | Kim Do Hyun | Ulala Session | | |
| 5 | Kim Do Hyun | Kim Do Hyun | Ulala Session | Togeworl | | | |
| 6 | Lee Jung Ah | Shin Ji Soo | Christina | | | | |
| 7 | Chris | Togeworl | Togeworl | | | | |
| 8 | Busker Busker | Busker Busker | | | | | |
| 9 | Shin Ji Soo | Ulala Session | | | | | |
| 10 | Ulala Session | | | | | | |
| 11 | Togeworl | | | | | | |

Note

- The order is based on the order in which the above contestants performed.
- Super-Save Scheme: The contestant who scores the highest score from the judges will be exempted from being eliminated regardless of the poll results.

Winner
Super-Save
Dropout
