= Ulala Session =

South Korean boy band

- Origin: Seoul, South Korea
- Genres: K-pop
- Years active: 2011–present
- Labels: Ulala Company
- Members: Kim Myung-hoon; Park Seung-il; Choi Do-won
- Past members: Lim Yoon-taek; Park Kwang-sun; Goon Jo; Ha Jun-seok

Ulala Session (Korean: 울랄라 세션) is a South Korean boy band that rose to fame after winning the 2011 television talent show Superstar K 3. The group currently consists of members Kim Myung-hoon, Park Seung-il, Choi Do-won. The group originally included Lim Yoon-taek, who died from gastric cancer in 2013, and Park Kwang-sun, who left after enlisting in the military in 2015. Choi Do-won and Ha Jun-seok joined the group in 2016.

== Career ==
Prior to their appearance on Superstar K3, the group was not widely known in South Korea, performing "anywhere, even in the middle of a schoolyard if there was a stage."

During Superstar K3, audiences responded particularly fondly to lead singer Lim's battle with stomach cancer. This led to some speculation that Ulala Session was making up the story of Lim's cancer as a way to garner sympathy during the competition; Lim responded in July 2012 by bringing his doctor on SBS's One Night in TV Entertainment to confirm the diagnosis.

On 11 February 2013, Lim Yoon-taek, leader of Ulala Session, died from gastric cancer.

== Discography ==
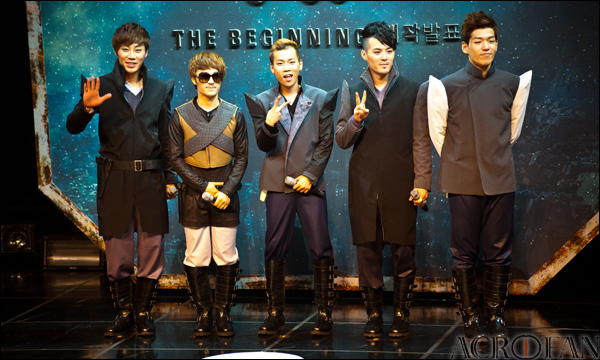
In July 2012

=== Studio albums ===
Title	Album details	Peak chart positions	Sales
Title	Album details	KOR	Sales
reJOYce	Released: November 19, 2014; Label: Ulala Company; Formats: CD, digital download	22	KOR: 798+

=== Extended plays ===
Title	Album details	Peak chart positions	Sales
Title	Album details	KOR	Sales
Ulala Sensation	Released: May 10, 2012 (Part 1), May 17, 2012 (Part 2); Label: Stone Music Entertainment; Formats: CD, digital download	5	KOR: 24,497+
Memory	Released: June 27, 2013; Label: Ulala Company; Formats: CD, digital download	10	KOR: 2,299+

=== Singles ===
Title	Year	Peak chart positions		Album
Title	Year	KOR Gaon	KOR Hot 100	Album
As lead artist
"With You" (너와 함께)	2011	8	6	Non-album single
"Beautiful Night" (아름다운 밤)	2012	4	5	Ulala Sensation Part 1
"Used It All Up" (다 쓰고 없다)	2012	14	10	Ulala Sensation Part 2
"Fonky" feat. Sul Woon Do	2013	46	—	Non-album single
"To Lover" (사랑하는 이에게) originally by Deux	2013	43	—	Deux 20th Anniversary Tribute
"I'll Be There" (한사람)	2013	17	—	Memory
"Those Who Are Crying Now" (지금 우는 사람들)	2014	35	—	Memory
"Talk of Dreams" (꿈의 대화) originally by Joo Young-hoon	2014	29	—	Joo Young-hoon 20th Anniversary
"Anxious Heart" (애타는 마음) with IU	2014	4	—N/a	Non-album single
"I'll Come to You" (내가 갈게)	2014	86	—N/a	reJOYce
"Beautiful" (아름다운 한컷) feat. Wutan	2017	—	—N/a	Non-album single
"—" denotes song did not chart. The Kpop Hot 100 chart was discontinued between May 2014 and May 2017.

=== Soundtrack appearances ===
Title	Year	Peak chart positions		Album
Title	Year	KOR Gaon	KOR Hot 100	Album
"Falling Moon" (달의 몰락) originally by Hyeon-Cheol Kim	2011	3	6	Superstar K 3 OST
"Open Arms" originally by Journey	2011	1	2	Superstar K 3 OST
"Beautiful Girl" (미인) originally by Shin Jung-hyeon	2011	7	14	Superstar K 3 OST
"Bad Guy" (나쁜 남자) originally by Rain	2011	19	47	Superstar K 3 OST
"Western Sky" (서쪽 하늘) originally by Lee Seung-chul	2011	1	1	Superstar K 3 OST
"Swing Baby" originally by J.Y. Park	2011	6	8	Superstar K 3 OST
"Goodbye Day"	2012	7	4	Bridal Mask OST
"Tuesdays When It Rains" (화요일에 비가 내리면) originally by Park Mi-kyung	2012	57	96	Immortal Songs 2 OST
"A Small Pond" (작은 연못) originally by Kim Min-ki	2012	97	—	Immortal Songs 2 OST
"Pathetic" (비창) originally by Lee Sang-woo	2012	33	33	Immortal Songs 2 OST
"Draw You Out" (그려본다)	2013	42	—	Scandal OST
"The Moon Cries" (달이 웁니다)	2013	75	—	Golden Rainbow OST
"Love Fiction"	2014	13	—N/a	It's Okay, That's Love OST
"With My Tears" (내 눈물 모아)	2015	26	—N/a	Persevere, Goo Hae Ra OST
"Family" (가족)	2015	—	—N/a	Persevere, Goo Hae Ra OST
"Maybe" (그랬나봐) with U Sung-eun	2015	63	—N/a	Persevere, Goo Hae Ra OST
"She Is Smiling" (그녀가 웃잖아) with U Sung-eun, Jinyoung, Min Hyo-rin	2015	—	—N/a	Persevere, Goo Hae Ra OST
"Listen" (들려)	2016	—	—N/a	Blow Breeze OST
"Don't Be Depressed" (우울해하지 말아요)	2018	—	—	Ugly Miss Young-Ae OST
"Waikiki Wonderland" (와이키키 원더랜드)	2018	—	—	Welcome to Waikiki OST
"Stay"	2018	—	—	Queen of Mystery 2 OST
"Run Through Time" (시간을 달려)	2018	—	—	A Poem a Day OST
"Timid Man" (소심한 남자)	2022	—	—	It's Beautiful Now OST
"—" denotes song did not chart. The Kpop Hot 100 chart was discontinued between May 2014 and May 2017.

=== Other charted songs ===
Title	Year	Peak chart positions		Album
Title	Year	KOR Gaon	KOR Hot 100	Album
"U-La-La"	2012	32	20	Ulala Sensation Part 1
"Urbanic"	2012	52	37	Ulala Sensation Part 1
"I'm Happy" (난 행복해)	2012	59	46	Ulala Sensation Part 2
"Wedding Singer"	2012	75	59	Ulala Sensation Part 2
"Dynamite" feat. T (Yoon Mi-rae)	2012	34	27	Ulala Sensation Part 2
"Fertilizer" (거름)	2013	28	—	Memory
"—" denotes song did not chart.
