= Korean indie =

Independent music from South Korea

Korean indie, referring to independent music in South Korea, developed in the 1990s in Hongdae, an area of Northwestern Seoul. It is widely regarded as the counterpart to K-pop; whereas K-pop is characterized by a commercialized image targeting a specific audience, Korean indie emphasizes the authentic messages of musicians. The most successful indie band during Korean indie's early stages was Crying Nut, who achieved historic mainstream crossover by selling over 100,000 copies of their 1998 debut album and winning multiple industry awards; however, following the scene's 2005 broadcast incident, The Black Skirts helped revive the underground scene with his album 201. He later became a seminal figure of the korean indie scene, often recognised as "Godfather of Modern Korean Indie" or "Seoul's indie Institution".

Furthermore, Hyukoh is widely recognised as the band who made korean indie music popular globally reaching billboard charts. Jannabi is widely known as korea's most loved indie rock band (duo) with albums such as legend. Car, the garden is widely recognised one of leading contemporary pillars alongside acts such as Silica Gel who won Musician of the year in 2024 and Wave to Earth who won best band award in 2025.

== Background ==
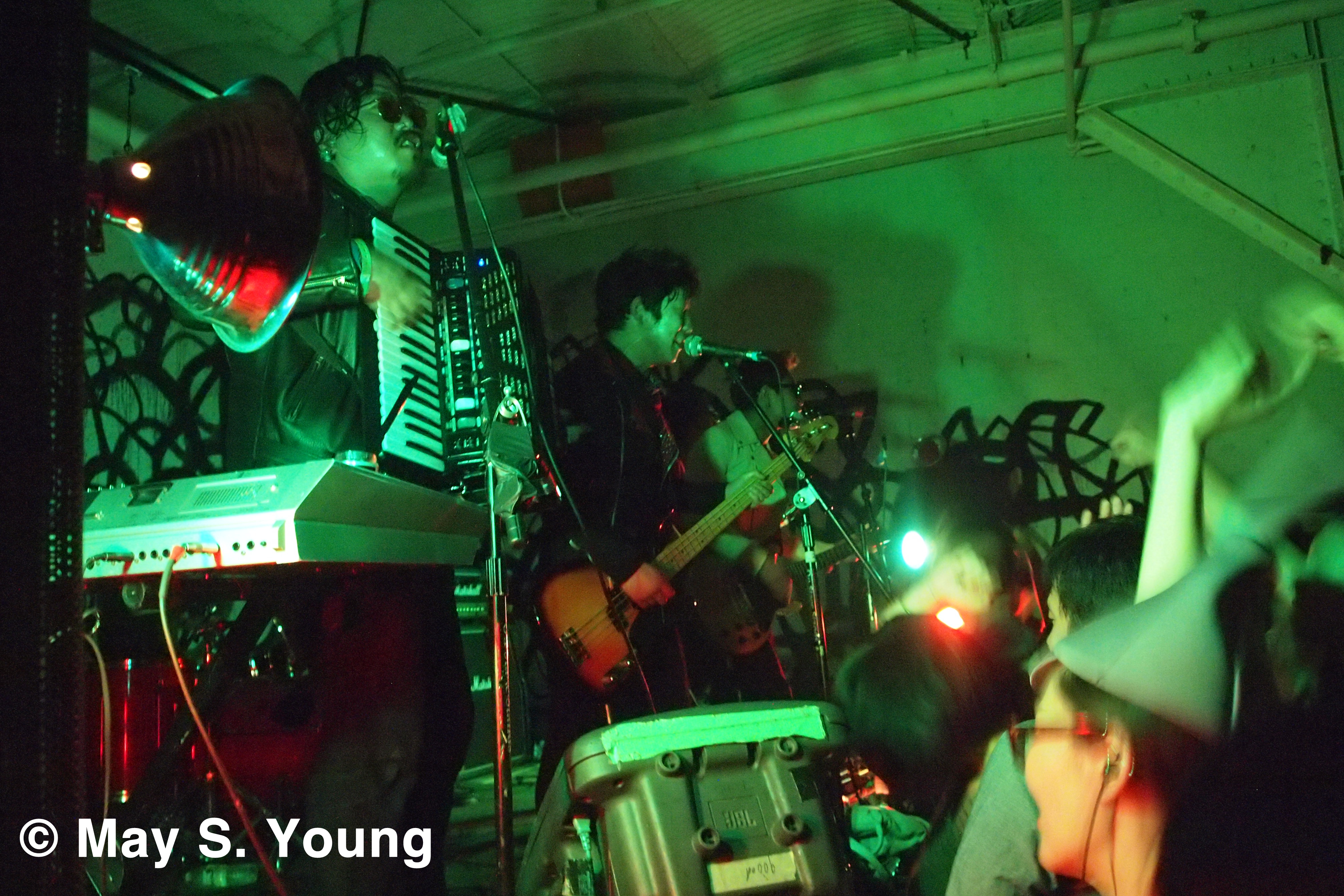
Popular indie group Crying Nut

South Korea's first modern wave of indie music began after the end of the military regime in 1987, coinciding with the rise of South Korea's popular culture during the early to mid-1990s. While experienced rock musicians tried to revive their musical careers, the younger generation developed a new punk and rock community in the Hongdae area of Seoul. New artists from this era include the bands Crying Nut, Pippi Band, and Seo Taiji and Boys. As a punk rock group, Crying Nut was formed in 1993 and is “Korea's most successful indie band”, selling over 100,000 copies of their debut album in 1998. Pippi Band was an unconventional indie grunge band that debuted in 1995 with a lead singer who dressed and acted in a unique manner. Seo Taiji and Boys, despite their mainstream success, is still considered a part of innovative Korean indie of the time because they were a self-produced and self-promoted group.

Korean culture, including the music industry, was notably changed after the 1997 Asian Financial Crisis. It was a difficult time for South Korean indie music; economic slowdown, the development of digital music, and increased incidences of piracy all meant fewer CD sales for artists. The gentrification of Hongdae in the mid-2000s also contributed to the end the first wave of Korean indie music. Another factor in the fall of the first wave was an incident on an MBC television program, Live Music Camp, in 2005. During a live performance by a South Korean punk rock band, Rux, two men from another indie band, Couch, stripped nude and exposed themselves on national television. This incident negatively impacted public opinion of both the ongoing indie music scene and MBC.

Influencial indie rock musician The Black Skirts

After the mid 2000s, alongside the Korean wave, came a second wave of Korean indie with The Black Skirts in 2008, the solo project of musician Jo hyu il who completely altered the scene with his debut and continued stay as the most influential rock musician over next 15 years of the korean indie scene alongside acts such as Kiha & the Faces, Broccoli, You Too?, and 9 and the Numbers. Kiha & The Faces were able to connect with a new audience thanks to their 2008 hit single, "Ssaguryeo Keopi" (English: Cheap Coffee). Another successful band was Broccoli, You Too?, an authentic indie pop band that gained popularity through their first album No More Encore, released in 2008. An indie rock group influenced by retro sounds, 9 and the Numbers, was also successful with their eponymous debut album in late 2009.

By the time the second wave occurred, indie music in South Korea had become more diverse compared to its rock-dominated past. Mellow, acoustic sounds began to gain popularity. Due to globalization, young rock groups started incorporating English lyrics into their music, in contrast with the former nationalistic era, when musicians were accused of copying Western-style music.

Although Korean indie is often considered subculture, influence from mass and viral media has made the internet the primary platform for indie music, giving individuals who wish to create music an easy opportunity to do so while also providing them a chance for viral success. Additionally, more financial support is being given to indie musicians in the form of concerts and festivals hosted by large corporations. Korean indie has also spread to other countries; Jambinai, the most successful overseas Korean indie band, and an increasing number of other indie groups have been performing abroad in locations such as Asia, Europe, and North America.

== Local scenes ==
=== Shinchon ===
Until commercialization in the 1990s, underground music and student culture thrived in Sinchon, a university district in Seoul, during the 1970s and 1980s.

=== Hongdae ===
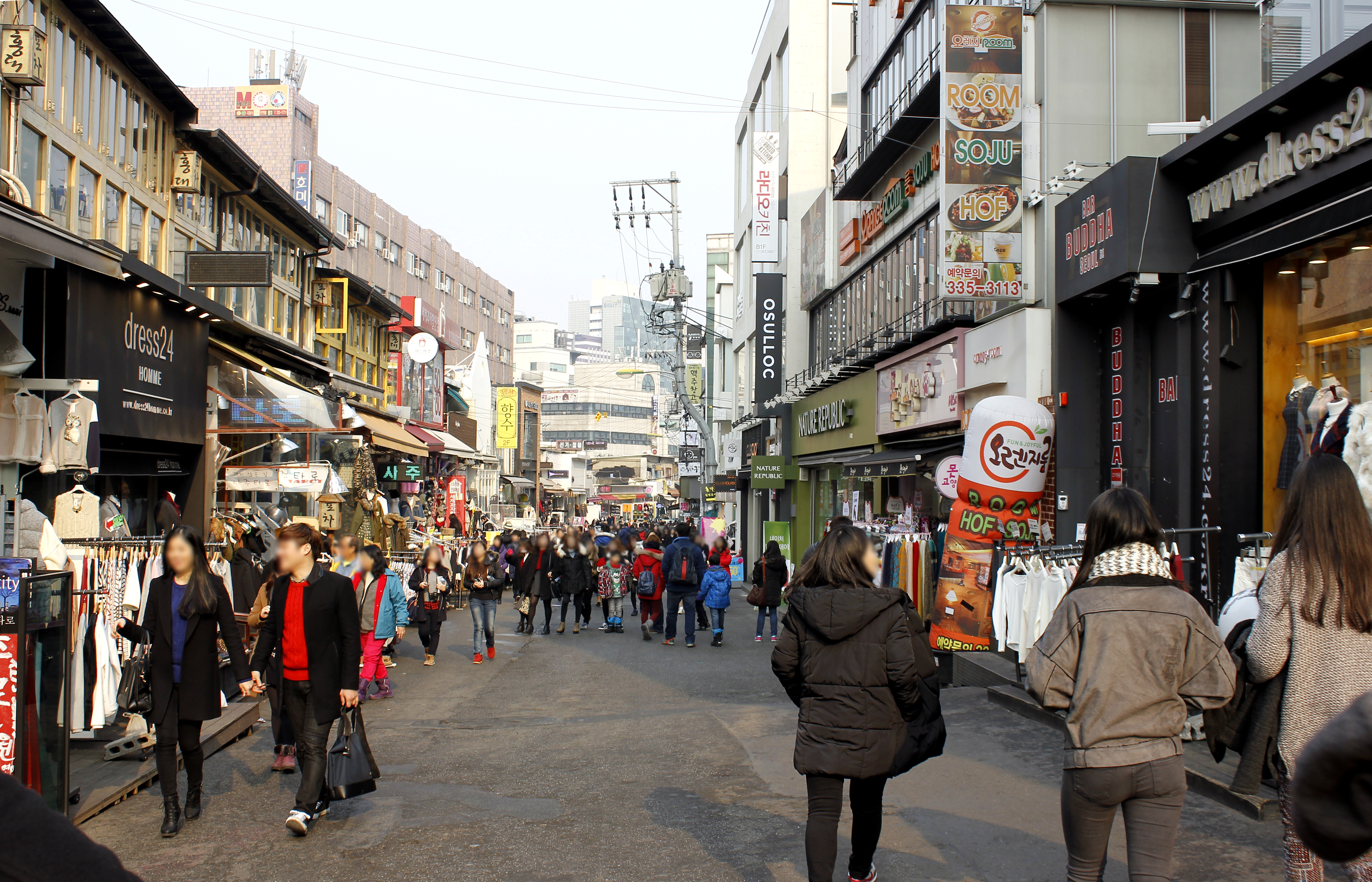
Hongdae Street in Seoul

Situated in northwestern Seoul, Hongdae is home to a vibrant and diverse indie music culture and to Hongik University, an institution with a prestigious art program. Having developed as the center of subculture since the 1990s, cheap rent enabled the establishment of numerous underground clubs, live music venues, record stores, and studios, gathering talented indie musicians. Groups such as Crying Nut and No Brain are both indie bands that gained fame from a small club in Hongdae called Spot. One of the most famous clubs in Hongdae is Drug, which opened in 1994 and established their record label in 1996, having played a crucial part in the underground music scene. Although Hongdae experienced a period of mass gentrification during the mid-2000s economic boom, it remains a significant indie music scene, with over 40 underground clubs, and attracting more than 500 new indie bands each year.

=== Gwanak ===
Gwanak, the working-class area of Southern Seoul, played a crucial role in the development of Korean indie music. It produced talented artists such as Kim Namhun and Change Kiha, both members of Nunco Band. Famous for being the home of the renowned school, Seoul National University, student activism, political protest, and music were key elements of its culture until the 1990s. In the early 2000s, activities such as the campus song movement made Gwanak a center for experimentation in musical styles, including the fusion of folk and rock, a crucial milestone in Korean music history. The indie label Boongaboonga Records (BGBG) was established in 2004 as a result of Gwanak’s music culture.

== Music festivals ==
Music festivals that include Korean indie performances
Years	Festival Name	Country, Venue
2006–present	Pentaport Rock Festival	South Korea
2000–present	Busan Rock Festival	South Korea
2018–present	DMZ Peace Train Music Festival	South Korea
2022–present	Block Party Music and Art Festival	South Korea
2012–present	Zandari Festa	South Korea
2007–present	Grand Mint Festival	South Korea
2015	K-Indie Rock Showcase	UK
2007–?	Korea-Japan Oi! Festival	South Korea and Japan
2014–present	SXSW “K-Pop Night Out”	USA
1999–2014	Ssamzi Sound Festival	South Korea

== Labels ==
- Antenna (record label)
- Around Us Entertainment
- Baljunso
- Konnect Entertainment
- Music Farm (record label)
- Pastel Music

== Korean indie groups ==
- 92914
- 10cm
- Autumn Vacation
- Bolbbalgan4
- Busker Busker
- Bye Bye Badman
- Bye Bye Sea
- Clazziquai
- Cheeze
- Cherry Filter
- Coffee Boy
- Crying Nut
- Danpyunsun and the Sailors
- Diealright
- Eastern Sidekick
- From the Airport
- Galaxy Express
- The Geeks
- Glen Check
- Green Flame Boys
- Guckkasten
- Hathaw9y
- Humming Urban Stereo
- Hyukoh
- Jannabi
- Jaurim
- Kiha & The Faces
- Kingston Rudieska
- The Koxx
- Love X Stereo
- Loveholics
- Mot
- Nell
- Nemesis
- No Brain
- Rooftop Moonlight
- Onnine Ibalgwan
- Pia
- Raspberry Field
- The Black Skirts
- The RockTigers
- The Rose
- Rolling Quartz
- Rubber Duckie
- Rumble Fish
- Rux
- Shinchireem
- ...Whatever That Means
- Skasucks
- SURL
- Swingz
- Vanilla Unity
- Vrose
- Walking After U
- Wave to Earth
- Zzzaam

== See also ==
- Independent music
- Music of South Korea
