= Luna discography =

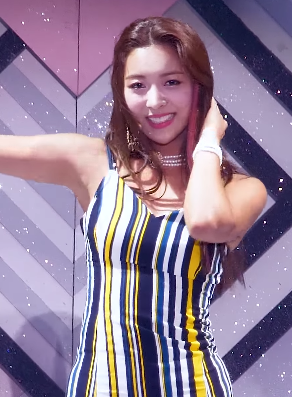
- Luna at SMTOWN LIVE in July 2017
- EPs: 1
- Singles: 25
- B-sides: 5
- Music videos: 22
- Soundtrack appearances: 24

The discography of South Korean singer-songwriter Luna consists of one extended play, twenty-five singles, including ten as a lead artist, eight collaborations, seven as a featured artist (including one as Luna Snow), and twenty-four soundtrack appearances.

== Extended plays ==
Title	Details	Peak chart positions		Sales
Title	Details	KOR	US World	Sales
Free Somebody	Release date: May 31, 2016; Label: SM Entertainment; Formats: CD, digital download	5	3	KOR: 10,318+

== Singles ==
=== As lead artist ===
Title	Year	Peak chart positions		Sales	Album
Title	Year	KOR	US World	Sales	Album
"Don't Cry for Me"	2015	32	—	KOR (DL): 85,335+	Non-album single
"Free Somebody"	2016	57	8	KOR (DL): 75,339+	Free Somebody
"Night Reminiscin'" (그런 밤) (With Yang Da-il)	2018	— (Note: "Night Reminiscin'" did not enter the Gaon Digital Chart, but appeared at number 92 on the component Download Chart.)	—	—N/a	Non-album singles
"Even So"	2019	—	22	—N/a	Even So
"Do You Love Me" (featuring George)	2019	—	23	—N/a	Even So
"Bye Bye" (안녕 이대로 안녕)	2019	—	—	—N/a	Even So
"It Hurts And Hurts" (아프고 아파도)	2020	—	—	—N/a	X-MAS Project Vol.2
"Madonna"	2021	— (Note: "Madonna" did not enter the Gaon Digital Chart, but appeared at number 98 on the component Download Chart.)	—	—N/a	Non-album singles
"If It's Our Last Time" (우리 마지막이라면)	2025	—	—	—N/a	Non-album singles
"Cotton Candy"(With Kylie of KIIRAS)	2026	—	—	—N/a	Non-album singles
"—" denotes releases that did not chart or were not released in that region.

=== As featured artist ===
Title	Year	Peak chart positions		Sales	Album
Title	Year	KOR	US World	Sales	Album
"Get Down" (SHINee featuring Luna)	2009	—	—	—N/a	2009, Year of Us
"Ten Years" (Donghae & Eunhyuk featuring Luna)	2014	—	—	—N/a	Ride Me
"Dream Drive" (Play the Siren featuring Luna)	2014	—	—	—N/a	Dream Drive
"We Own the World" (Justin Oh featuring Luna and Amber)	2015	—	—	—N/a	Non-album single
"It Was Love" (사랑이었다) (Zico featuring Luna)	2016	5	20	KOR (DL): 827,623+	Break Up 2 Make Up
"Still" (NakJoon (Bernard Park) featuring Luna)	2018	—	—	—N/a	Non-album single
"Flight Mode" (Marvel Rivals) (Luna Snow featuring Luna)	2026	—	—	—N/a	Non-album single
"—" denotes releases that did not chart or were not released in that region.

=== Collaborations ===
Title	Year	Peak chart positions		Sales	Album
Title	Year	KOR	US World	Sales	Album
"Wave" (with R3hab, Amber and Xavi&Gi)	2016	—	5	—N/a	SM Station Season 1
"Heartbeat" (with Amber, featuring Ferry Corsten & Kago Pengchi)	2016	—	6	—N/a	SM Station Season 1
"It's You" (그대라서) (with Shin Yong-jae)	2016	95	—	KOR (DL): 23,501+	SM Station Season 1
"Tell Me It's Okay" (괜찮다고 말해줘) (with Junhyung)	2017	—	—	—N/a	Non-album singles
"Honey Bee" (with Hani and Solar)	2017	—	—	KOR (DL): 63,673+	Non-album singles
"Lower" (with Amber)	2018	—	4	—N/a	S.M. Station Season 2
"Free Somebody (with everysing)" (with Heda)	2018	—	—	—N/a	S.M. Station Season 2
"When the night is over" (with UL, featuring Danny Jung)	2022	—	—	—N/a	Non-album singles
"—" denotes releases that did not chart or were not released in that region.

== Soundtrack appearances ==
Title	Year	Peak chart positions		Album
Title	Year	KOR	KOR Hot.	Album
"Hard but Easy" (어렵고도 쉬운) (with Krystal)	2009	—	—	Invincible Lee Pyung Kang OST
"Spread its Wings" (with Krystal and Amber)	2010	—	—	Master of Study OST
"Calling Out" (불러본다) (with Krystal)	2010	—	—	Cinderella's Sister OST
"Beautiful Day" (아름다운 날)	2010	—	—	Please Marry Me OST
"Beautiful Day" (아름다운 날) [Slow Version]	2010	—	—	Please Marry Me OST
"And I Love You" (너를 사랑하고) (with Yesung)	2010	—	—	The President OST
"Jump" (with Jeong Hyeong-don)	2011	—	—	Enjoy Today OST
"It's Me" (나야) (with Sunny)	2012	25	16	To the Beautiful You OST
"It's Okay" (괜찮아)	2012	—	—	Cheongdam-dong Alice OST
"U+Me"	2013	—	—	TalesWeaver OST
"Start of Something New" (with Ryeowook)	2013	—	—	High School Musical on Stage! OST
"Shine Your Way" (with Kyuhyun)	2013	—	—	The Croods OST
"Healing Love" (with Choi(LU:KUSS))	2015	98	—	Kill Me, Heal Me OST
"Only You" (그대만 살아서)	2015	—	—	The Merchant: Gaekju 2015 OST
"Dream" (드림)	2016	—	—	The Lightning Man's Secret OST
"Joyland" (조이랜드) (with Han Seung-hyeon, Lee Soo-wan, Kim Bo-seon and Lee Jae-yoon)	2016	—	—	The Lightning Man's Secret OST
"Thunderbolt Princess" (번개공주)	2016	—	—	The Lightning Man's Secret OST
"Where Are You"	2017	—	—	Bad Thief, Good Thief OST
"Another Day" (하루 또 하루) (with Song Chang-eui)	2017	—	—	Rebecca OST
"Could You Tell Me" (말해줄래요)	2017	—	—	The King in Love OST
"Is It Love?" (사랑일까요)	2018	—	—	Should We Kiss First? OST
"Bluffing"	2018	—	—	The Player OST Part. 4
"Take Me Now"	2020	—	—	Forest OST Part. 1
"Cheers"	2020	—	—	Graceful Friends OST Part. 4
"Falling Flowers" (꽃날)	2020	—	—	Almost Famous OST Part. 6
"—" denotes releases that did not chart or were not released in that region.

== Other appearances ==
Title	Year	Other artist(s)	Album
"Let's Go"	2010	Various Artists	Group Of 20
"For a Thousand Days" (천일동안) [Lee Sung-hwan Cover]	2012	—N/a	Immortal Songs 2
"Traveling Together" (동행) [Choi Sung-soo Cover]	2012	—N/a	Immortal Songs 2
"Needlessly" (공연히) [Yoo Shi-nae Cover]	2012	Amber Liu	Immortal Songs 2
"Fool" (바보)	2012	—N/a	Immortal Songs 2
"I Don't Know" (알 수 없어) [Cho Ja-moon Cover]	2012	—N/a	Immortal Songs 2
"Sunny Day" (해뜰날) [Song Daek-wan Cover]	2012	—N/a	Immortal Songs 2
"Salt Doll" (소금인형)	2015	—N/a	Immortal Songs 2 EP.341
"Just a Love" (사랑일뿐야)	2015	Amber Liu	Sugarman
"I Will Survive"	2015	Solar, Ailee, Eunji	2015 Gayo Daejun Limited Edition
"Sound of Your Heart" (너의 목소리)	2016	Various Artists	Non-album single
"Father" (아버지)	2017	Park Jinyoung	Immortal Song – Singing The Legend (2017 Family Special)
"Dear My Family" (re-issue from 2012 release)	2017	Various Artists	Non-album single
"A Farewell Tour" (이별여행) [Won Mi-yeon Cover]	2019	—N/a	MBC '1st Place Now is?'
"Starlight Compass" (별빛 나침반)	2021	Dream-I	I will protect you
"Rain and You" (비와 당신) [ Lee Mu-jin Cover]	2021	—N/a	The Playlist Part. 8

== Music videos ==
Title	Year	Director
As lead artist
"Hard but Easy" (어렵고도 쉬운) [Studio Video] (with Krystal)	2009	—N/a
"Shine Your Way" (Studio Video) (with Kyuhyun)	2013	—N/a
"Start of Something New" (Studio Video) (with Ryeowook)	2013	—N/a
"U+Me"	2013	—N/a
"One Day One Chance" (with Changmin, Key, Xiumin, Suho and Seulgi)	2016	—N/a
"Dream" (드림) [Studio Video]	2016	—N/a
"Joyland" (조이랜드) (with Han Seung-hyeon, Lee Soo-wan, Kim Bo-seon and Lee Jae-yoon)	2016	—N/a
"Wave" (with R3hab, Amber and Xavi&Gi)	2016	VM PRODUCTION
"Free Somebody"	2016	Shin Hee Won
"Heartbeat" (with Amber, featuring Ferry Corsten & Kago Pengchi)	2016	—N/a
"It's You" (with Shin Yong-jae)	2016	—N/a
"Sound of Your Heart" (with Lee Dong-woo, Yesung, Sunny, Seulgi, Wendy, Taeil and Doyoung)	2016	—N/a
"Tell Me It's Okay" (with Jun-hyung)	2017	—N/a
"Honey Bee" (with Hani and Solar)	2017	Naive Creative Production
"Another Day" (하루 또 하루) [Studio Video] (with Song Chang-eui)	2017	—N/a
"This Is Me" (Influencers Cover) (with Bradlee, Aquamarin, Ilonka, Eline, Carolina, Manoela, Conchita, Toby, Will, Bully, Jamie Natalia, Joshua, Kimberley, Ekin and Lola)	2017	—N/a
"This Is Me" (Studio Video)	2017	—N/a
"Lower" (with Amber)	2018	—N/a
"Free Somebody (with everysing)" (with Heda)	2018	—N/a
"Night Reminiscin'" (그런 밤) (with Yang Da-il)	2018	Kim Sunhyuk
"Even So" (운다고)	2019	Han Tae-ho (a.k.a. thoyarino)
"Do You Love Me" (feat. George)	2019	—N/a
"BYE BYE" (안녕 이대로 안녕)	2019	—N/a
As featured artist
"Dream Drive" (Play the Siren featuring Luna)	2014	—N/a
"It Was Love" (사랑이었다) (Zico featuring Luna)	2016	SEP
"Still" (NakJoon (Bernard Park) featuring Luna)	2018	—N/a

== See also ==
- f(x) discography
- Amber Liu discography
- List of SM Entertainment artists
