= Kasper (singer) =

South Korean rapper (born 1993)

Kasper 캐스퍼
- Born: Lee Se-rin; April 17, 1993 (age 33); United States
- Genre: Hip hop
- Occupations: Singer; rapper; YouTuber
- Years active: 2014–present
- Labels: Baljunso (2014–2016); DSP Media (2016–2018)

Korean name
- Hangul: 이세린
- RR: I Serin
- MR: I Serin

Lee Se-rin (Korean: 이세린; born April 17, 1993), known by the stage name Kasper, is an American singer, rapper, and YouTuber. She is best known as a contestant of Show Me the Money 4, Unpretty Rapstar 2, and as a former member of co-ed hip-hop group Play the Siren. She debuted as a solo artist with her debut single, "Lean on Me", in January 2017.

== Career ==
=== YouTube (2010–present) ===
Kasper started a YouTube channel "KASPER 캐스퍼" on February 9, 2010. Also around 2012, she has been around YouTube sharing content on the channel "WishTrendTV". Where she talks about how it is in the industry and your go to tips on the Korean entertainment.

=== Play the Siren (2014–2016) ===
In 2014, Kasper joined the urban hip-hop group Play the Siren, which was managed under SM Entertainment's subsidiary indie label Baljunso. They debuted with their song "Dream Drive", featuring f(x)'s Luna in July 2014. During 2015, the group disbanded, Kasper was the final one to leave after the group and stayed with Balijunso until 2016.

=== Unpretty Rapstar (2015) ===
During 2015, Kasper joined Unpretty Rapstar Season 2 where she competed against artists including 4Minute's Jiyoon, Sistar's Hyolyn, Wonder Girls' Yubin, Fiestar's Yezi, as well as YG Trainee Sua and Clover's Gilme. Kasper was eliminated in episode 8 alongside Cosmic Girls, Exy. Kasper gave a negative opinion of the show's editing, saying that she was disappointed at how she was "made into the concept the show wanted me to be," and that they "played with human relationships."

=== Solo career (2016–present) ===
During the middle of 2016, Kasper has signed a contract with DSP Media. DSP spoke out on the recruitment of Kasper into DSP Media. By stating ""KASPER is a hip hop singer where she has potential to improve and have good energy. She has the kind of image where she will be good at acting as a lover or girl crush. We will try our best for KASPER to become a better artist." On January 18, 2017 Kasper made her official solo debut with her single "Lean on Me" under her new label DSP Media. Her video came out after the release on DSP Media's YouTube channel.

In August 2018, Kasper used social media to surprise her fans that her first mini-album titled "Time Is Up" will be released on August 8, 2018. While she also uploaded a music video teaser for her next single "Clouds".

== Discography ==
=== Extended plays ===
Title	Details	Peaks	Sales
Title	Details	KOR	Sales
Time is Up	Released: August 8, 2018; Labels: Music&New; Formats: digital download	—N/a	

=== Singles ===
Title	Year	Peak chart positions		Sales	Album
Title	Year	KOR	KOR Hot	Sales	Album
"Lean on Me"	2017	—	—	—N/a	Non-album singles
"Clouds"	2018	—	—	—N/a	Time is Up
"—" denotes releases that did not chart or were not released in that region.

=== Featured artist ===
Year	Song	With	Ref.
2014	"Cypher"	Squalla, Baekbum, Chichi, Siren	
2015	"Don't Stop" (prod. by D.O)	Heize, Ash-B, Hyolyn, Yubin, Gilme, Ahn Soo Min, Yezi, Sua, KittiB, Truedy	

== Filmography ==
=== Music videos ===
Year	Song	Director
2017	"Lean On Me"	—N/a
2018	"Clouds"	—N/a

=== Television ===
Year	Title	Role	Network
2015	Show Me the Money 4	Contestant	Mnet
2015	Unpretty Rapstar 2	Contestant	Mnet
2016	Show Me the Money 6	Contestant	Mnet
2017	Society Game	Contestant	tvN
