= Emergenza =

Festival for unsigned bands

- Location: Worldwide (began in Rome)
- Years active: 1992–present
- Website: Emergenza.live

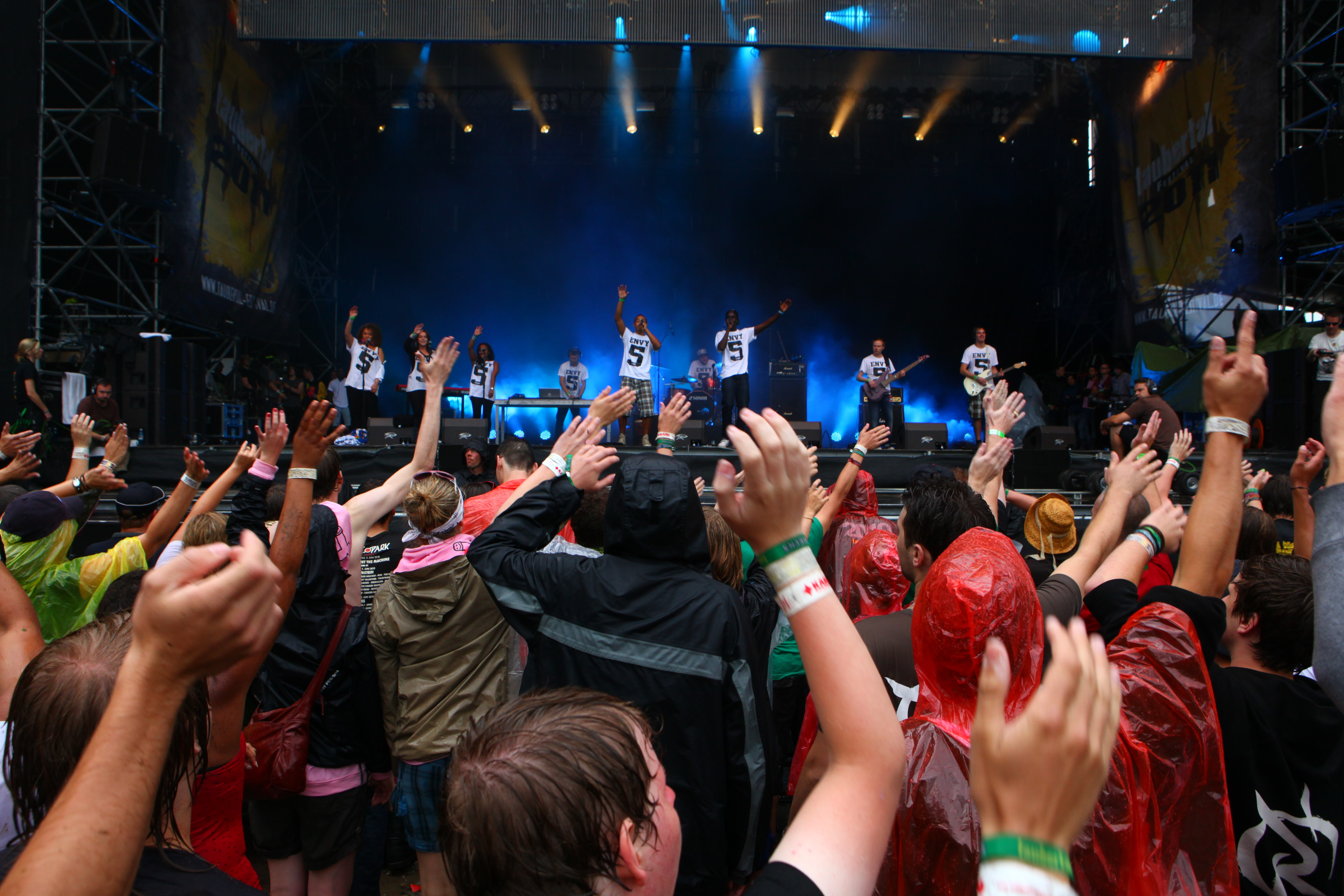
Envy from Oslo, Norway at Emergenza Barcelona 2011

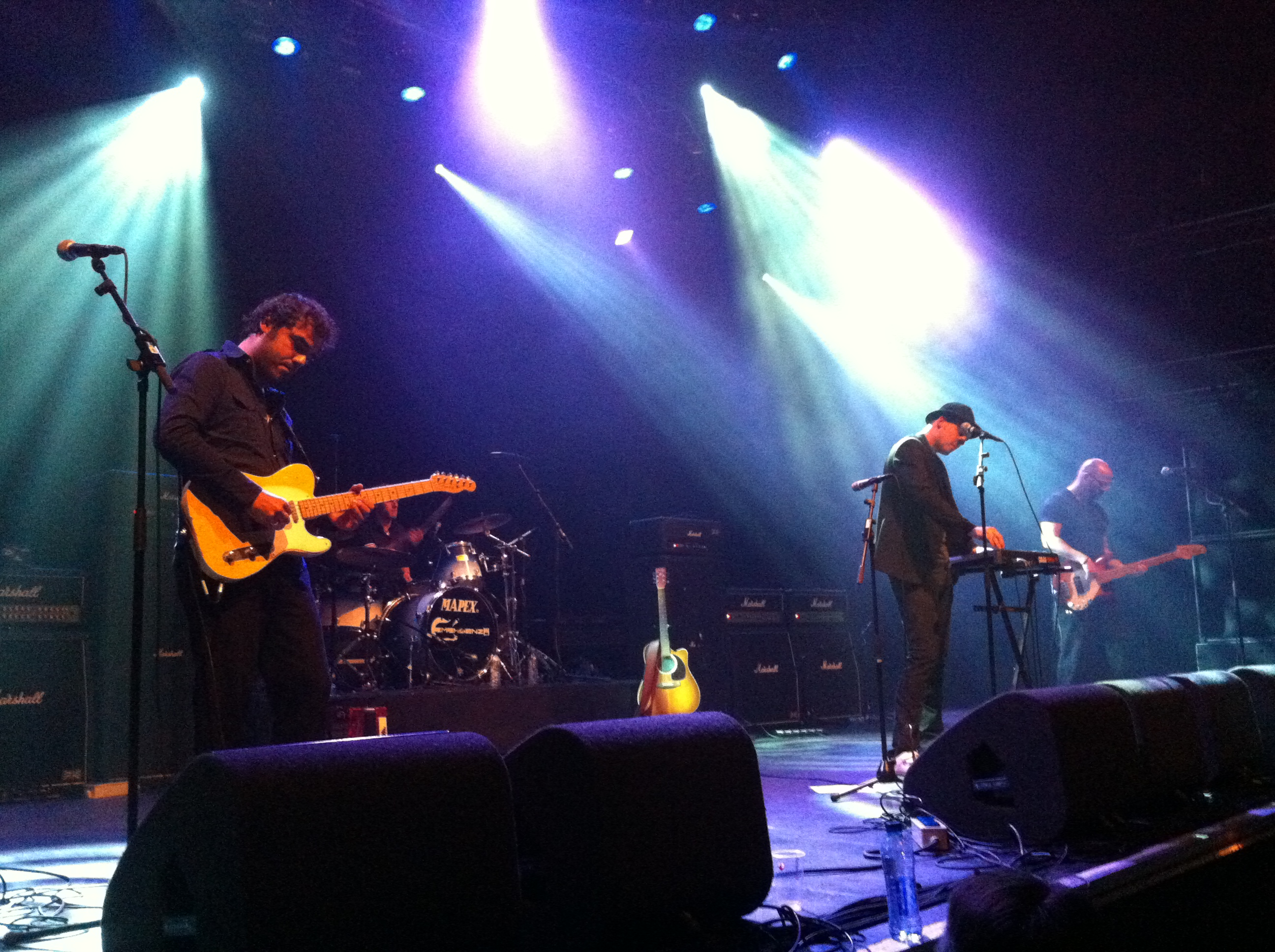
Knuckles of Frisco on Emergenza Benelux 2011

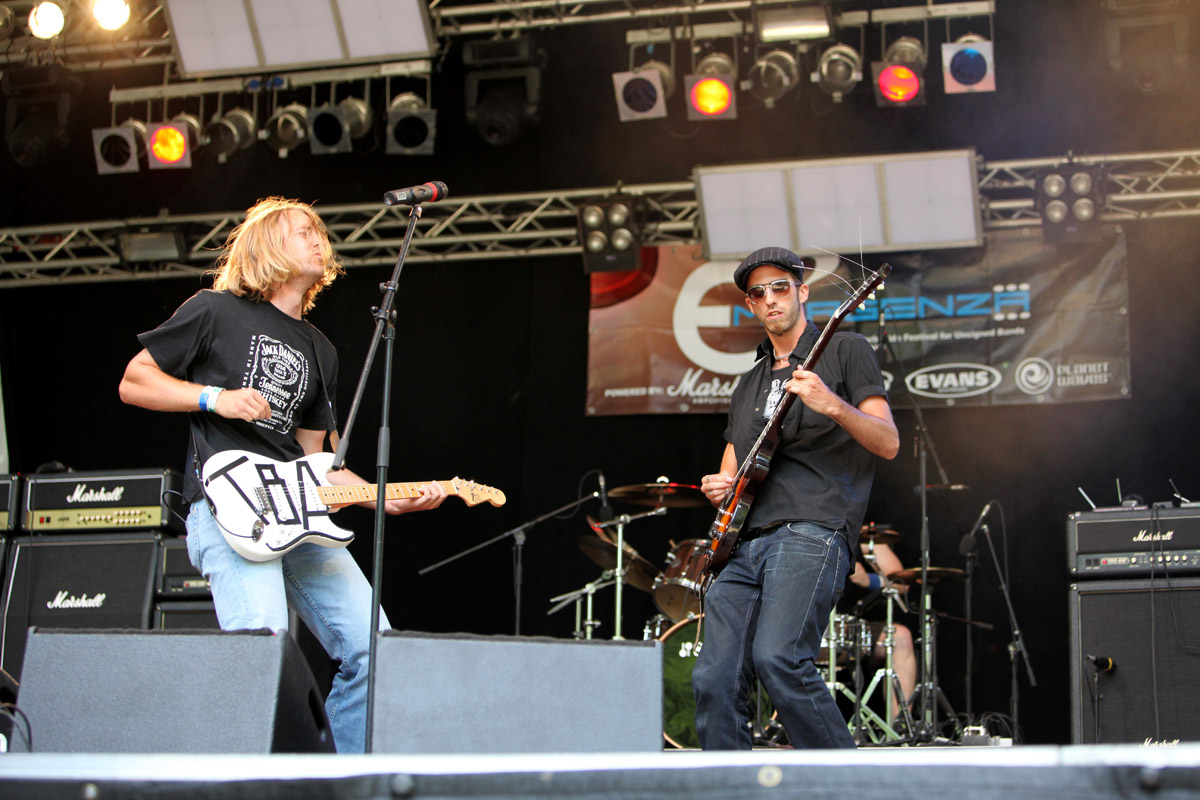
TBA from Prague, Czech Republic at Emergenza Barcelona 2009

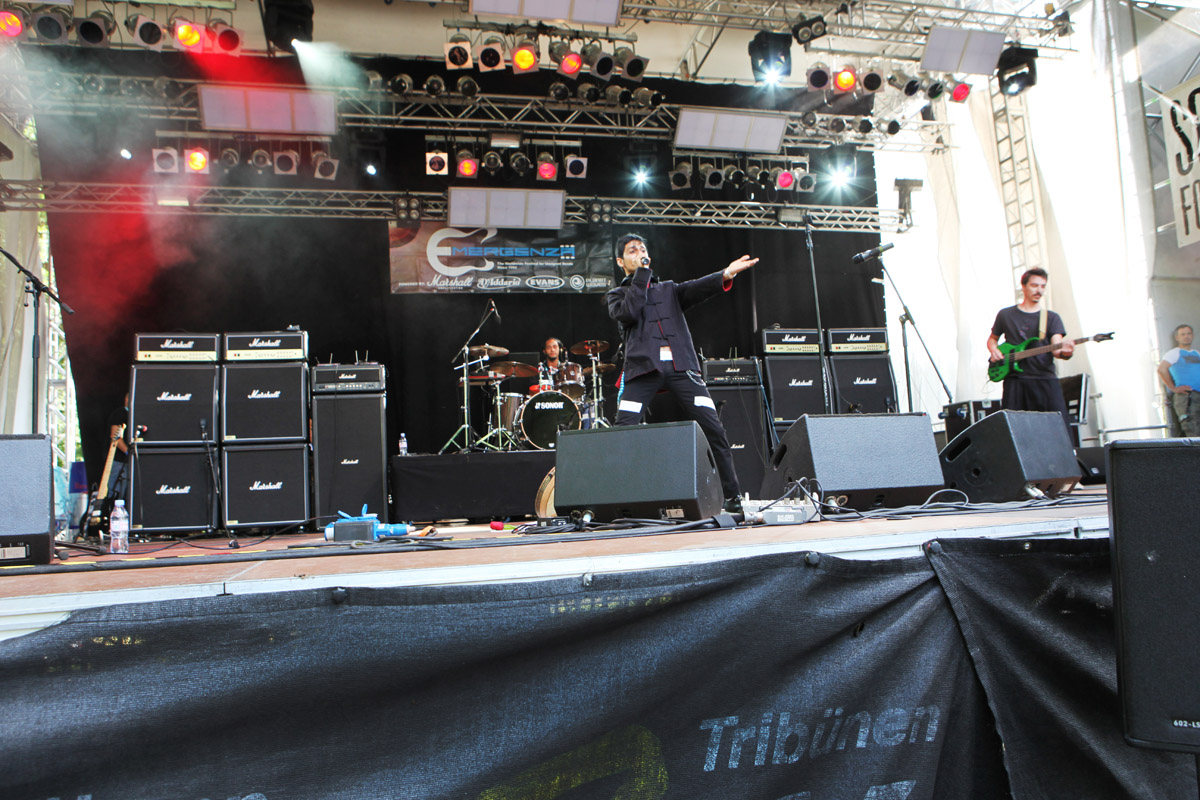
Yaseede from Padova, Italy at Emergenza Barcelona 2009

Emergenza is an annual music festival for unsigned bands. Its concerts have been held in more than 150 cities around the world.

Annually, a series of global elimination rounds takes place in various countries. Advancing bands are selected based on audience reception of their performances, with the ultimate winners determined by Emergenza judges during regional and final concerts.

== History ==
The Emergenza Festival had its origins in 1992 when a group of musician friends organized its inaugural event in Rome, Italy, with an initial audience of 245 attendees. Over the course of five months, attendance grew significantly, reaching three thousand. During the same year, the festival released its first compilation album.

From 1993 to 2003, Emergenza produced a total of 54 albums, including both live and studio recordings. In 1995, the official Emergenza logo was introduced.

The festival expanded beyond Italy on January 7, 1996, with its first concert held at the Gibus Club in Paris, France, attracting 113 participating bands. The following year marked the debut of the Emergenza European Final at the London Astoria in the United Kingdom, drawing an audience of 2,500.

In 2001, the festival crossed the Atlantic Ocean and landed in Montreal, Canada. By 2002, Emergenza had expanded to five cities, and in 2003, it featured over 700 bands across 190 events during its first U.S. season. The following year, 2,876 musicians participated in the United States, and an impressive sixteen thousand performed for audiences in Europe and Canada. By 2005, the festival had reached seventy North American cities.

Emergenza continued to grow, extending its reach to Japan and Australia in 2006, with shows in Sydney, Melbourne, Adelaide, and Tokyo. Later, Perth in Western Australia and Brisbane were included in Australia's roster. From 2008 to 2010, the festival expanded its presence to the Czech Republic, Slovenia, Russia, and New Zealand.

== International finals ==
=== 2023 ===
Year	Finalist Band	City/Country	Place
2023	The Rock Boy	France	—
2023	Afternoon Astronauts	Finland	—
2023	Grell	Germany	—
2023	Indra	Italy	—
2023	Oscar Kusko	Sweden	—
2023	Catch The Fox	Norway	—
2023	Wojtek	Denmark	—
2023	TRAinnovation	Japan	Winner

=== 2018 ===
Year	Finalist Band	City/Country	Place
2018	MELANCHOLIA	Italy	1
2018	COAST DOWN	Germany	2
2018	PANACHE!	France	3
2018	TAYLOR BEADLE-WILLIAMS	Australia	4
2018	MAGGIE PETKOVIC	Norway	5
2018	ART IN CRIME	Germany	6
2018	THAN	Japan	7
2018	I REVOLT	Finland	8
2018	TAM TEPLO	Russia	9
2018	Nerd Connection	South Korea	9
2018	MASSFACE	Russia	11
2018	DJOCY SANTOS	The Netherlands	12
2018	SAINT CITY ORCHESTRA	Switzerland	13
2018	THE KLETS	Belgium	14
2018	ALFA MARTIANS	France	15
2018	YESTERDAY IS HISTORY	Switzerland	16
2018	PETTY THINGS	Germany	17
2018	VEIRA	Poland	18
2018	TROPIC ACID	Spain	19
2018	BREAK UP LINES	Canada	20
2018	RAIN	Denmark	21

=== 2017 ===
Year	Finalist Band	City/Country	Place
2017	THE AGENCY	Denmark	1
2017	VOSEM PO GRINVICHU	Russia	2
2017	THE TREUEMEN	Germany	3
2017	SNARE COVER	Japan	4
2017	FRANK E LE FORME SONICHE	Italy	5
2017	OAKS ABOVE	Canada	6
2017	AMOLI	Norway	7
2017	DELIRIOUS MOB CREW	Switzerland	8
2017	ANVILED	Poland	9
2017	UNDERWOODS	Italy	10
2017	INTERIEUR NUIT	France	11
2017	CALLUM CHYNOWETH BAND	Australia	12
2017	61 MINDS	Belgium	13
2017	WALKING AFTER U	South Korea	14
2017	SEMPERFIELD	Germany	15
2017	HUANASTONE	Sweden	16
2017	STILL AWAKE	Germany	17
2017	TIME FOR ACTION	Spain	18
2017	BEATS UNLIMETED CREW	The Netherlands	19
2017	PLEINS PHARES	France	20

=== 2016 ===
Year	Finalist Band	City/Country	Place	Prize
2016	Gain Eleven	Sweden	1	
2016	Ku.dA	Italy	2	
2016	Noeazy	South Korea	3	Best Drummer
2016	Lady Moustache	Germany	4	
2016	Tri-Hidden Panic	France	5	Best Singer
2016	Orjazzmic	Spain	6	Best Bassist
2016	Skizzoidman	Japan	7	
2016	Owing to the Rain	Germany	8	
2016	Earthist	Italy	9	
2016	Hometown Lights	Canada	10	
2016	Rooftop Sailors	Switzerland	11	
2016	Sno	Norway	12	Best Keyboard
2016	Kellem	France	13	
2016	Octavian	Australia	14	
2016	Enter Rana	Finland	15	Best Guitarist
2016	Kressi	Russia	16	
2016	Jack Rabbit	Netherland	17	
2016	Madmagus	Belgium	18	
2016	Antiplan	Poland	19	
2016	Demian	Germany	20	
2016	Sweet Sleep	Japan	21	

=== 2015 ===
Year	Finalist Band	City/Country	Place	Prize
2015	Ninja Beats	Japan	1	
2015	Green Light District	Finland	2	
2015	Casablanca Drivers	France	3	
2015	Pravada	Russia	4	Best Drummer
2015	Love Cream	Australia	5	Best Singer
2015	Iréne	Sweden	6	
2015	Cedric	Germany	7	
2015	Candy Robbers	Belgium	8	
2015	Alfen	Denmark	9	
2015	Death Koolaid	UK	10	
2015	Lee Youn Chan Band	South Korea	11	Best Guitarist
2015	Syndicate	Germany	12	
2015	Schoko	Germany	13	Best Bassist
2015	Pora Wiatru	Poland	14	
2015	Siren	Italy	15	
2015	The II Romans	Switzerland	16	
2015	The Plugs	France	17	
2015	Pop James	Italy	18	
2015	Les Funktionnaires	Canada	19	
2015	To By Four	The Netherlands	20	

=== 2014 ===
Year	Finalist Band	City/Country	Place	Prize
2014	The Scheen	Norway	1	
2014	The Kitchies	France	2	2nd Best Drummer
2014	Shata QS	Poland	3	Best Singer
2014	Mercury White	Australia	4	
2014	Achille's Family	France	5	Best Drummer
2014	Oak and Willow	Italy	6	2nd Best Bass
2014	The Shouting Men	Germany	7	Best Bass
2014	Mr. Serious and Groove Monkeys	Germany	7	2nd Best Guitar
2014	Guesstimate	Spain	9	
2014	Blue Machine	Denmark	10	Best Guitar
2014	Face	Switzerland	11	
2014	Roadcrew	The Nederland	12	
2014	Thekenpoet	Germany	13	
2014	The Asphere's	Japan	14	
2014	Swim	Russia	15	
2014	Carlos Candido Band	Canada	16	
2014	David Pear	UK	17	
2014	Yabanci Degiliz	Turkey	18	

=== 2013 ===
Year	Finalist Band	City/Country	Place	Prize
2013	Obsolete Radio	France	1	
2013	Goldmouth	Germany	2	Best Guitarist
2013	Ordinary People	Italy	3	Best Bassist
2013	Cuervo	Australia	4	2nd Best Bassist
2013	Shout	Finland	5	
2013	Taro & Jiro	Japan	6	2nd Best Guitarist
2013	Finalstair	Germany	7	Best Drummer
2013	Hey! Elizabeth	Italy	7	
2013	Collect Call From Mars	Netherland	9	
2013	Cities Lullabies	France	10	
2013	Straight Jack Cat	Poland	11	
2013	Noyze	Canada	12	
2013	Rocco	Russia	13	Best Singer
2013	Awesome Arnold	Switzerland	14	
2013	Flowers in Syrup	Germany	15	
2013	Black Orchid Empire	UK	16	2nd Best Drummer
2013	Negative Nancy	Sweden	17	
2013	Vucaque	Spain	18	
2013	Kaos	Turkey	19	

=== 2012 ===
Year	Finalist Band	City/Country	Place	Prize
2012	Hurricane Love	Sweden	1	
2012	The Joking	France	2	Best bassist
2012	Rhys Crommin & The Toms	Australia	3	
2012	Avaivartika	Japan	4	2nd-best bassist
2012	The Blennies	Italy	5	2nd-best drummer
2012	Mari!Mari!	Russia	6	2nd-best guitarist
2012	Dudes	Norway	5	
2012	Odette	Spain	8	Best drummer
2012	The Carnabys	UK	9	Best guitarist
2012	Jimmy Dee	Netherlands	10	
2012	Disconnected Blind	Canada	11	
2012	Alcapell	Germany	12	
2012	Wellbad	Germany	13	
2012	Chico	Poland	14	
2012	Buddies	France	15	
2012	I Come From the Sun	Germany	16	Best singer
2012	Caffeine	Czech Republic	17	
2012	Mono Band	Turkey	18	

=== 2011 ===
Year	Finalist Band	City/Country	Place	Prize
2011	Envy	Oslo, Norway	1	Winning Band
2011	LSD on CIA	Copenhagen. Denmark	2	2nd band, best bass player
2011	Ruby Cube	Toulouse, France	3	Best guitar player
2011	S.H.E.	Tokyo, Japan	4	
2011	LeBelle	Melbourne, Australia	5	Woodbrass prize
2011	Emmecosta	Gothenburg, Sweden	6	2nd-best drummer
2011	Cafe Jazz	Dresden, Germany	5	Best drummer
2011	Cours Toujours	Montreal, Canada	8	Best singer
2011	Rag Dolls	Basilea, Switzerland	9	
2011	No Comment Band	Minsk, Belarus	10	2nd-best bass player
2011	Downhill	Bratislava, Slovakia	11	
2011	Filthy Whisky	London. UK	12	
2011	Mathieu Neil	Paris, France	13	
2011	Knuckles of Frisco	Arnhem, Netherlands	14	2nd-best guitar player
2011	Kerouac	Dublin, Ireland	15	
2011	Professor Grabowski	Munich, Germany	16	
2011	Cyrene	Barcelona, Spain	17	
2011	F.O.O.S.	Turin, Italy	18	

=== 2010 ===
Year	Finalist Band	City/Country	Place	Prize
2010	Hanatochiruran	Tokyo, Japan	1	Winning band, 2nd-best bass player
2010	Waldo & Marsha	Århus, Denmark	2	2nd band
2010	Barton Fink	Montreal, Canada	3	2nd-best drummer
2010	Modern Error	Sydney, Australia	4	
2010	Phases Cachés	Paris, France	5	Best bass player
2010	Factory Brains	Stockholm, Sweden	6	Best guitar player
2010	Waste	Bayreuth, Germany	7	Best singer
2010	Pop-Porn	Prague, Czech Republic	8	Best drummer
2010	Sir James	Tilburg, Netherlands	9	2nd-best guitar player
2010	Manolo Panic	Zurich, Switzerland	10	
2010	C.A.N.	Paris, France	11	
2010	Stepanov's Starlings	St. Petersburg, Russia	12	
2010	Brothorst	Oberursel, Germany	13	
2010	Stardust	Florence, Italy	14	
2010	Envy Assured	London, UK	15	
2010	The Melillo Brothers	New York, USA	16	
2010	Wednesday Fall	Barcelona, Spain	17	

=== 2009 ===
Year	Finalist Band	City/Country	Place	Prize
2009	Kid Galahad	Gothenburg, Sweden	1	Winning band, best drummer
2009	Werner Krauss	Leipzig, Germany	2	2nd band
2009	YaSeeDee	Ferrara, Italy	3	Best bass player
2009	The Wallpapers	Paris, France	4	
2009	The Reefs	Melbourne, Australia	5	2nd-best drummer
2009	Guru Guru	Tokyo, Japan	6	2nd-best guitar player
2009	The Excess	Munich, Germany	7	Best guitar player
2009	Back Pocket Memory	Los Angeles, USA	8	
2009	Lily Sparks	New York, USA	9	Best singer
2009	Year of the Dog	Helsinki, Finland	10	
2009	The Vlegels	Tilburg, Netherlands	11	Best Drummer
2009	Kaodic	Montreal, Canada	12	2nd-best bass player
2009	Leet	Hamburg, Germany	13	
2009	The Winter Kicks	London, UK	14	
2009	Gorodskaya Kultura	Moscow, Russia	15	
2009	TBA	Prague, Czech Republic	16	
2009	Clock N' Works	Paris, France	17	
2009	Susan's Red Nipples	Barcelona, Spain	18	

=== 2008 ===
Year	Finalist Band	City/Country	Place	Prize
2008	Gloria Cycles	Brighton, UK	1	Winning band
2008	The Mad Trist	Maastricht, Netherlands	2	2nd band
2008	A Match for the Curious	Toronto, Canada	3	2nd-best guitar player
2008	Auregan	Paris, France	4	Best performer
2008	The Vandolls	Sydney, Australia	5	Best guitar player
2008	Temple Hill	New York, USA	6	Best bass player
2008	Tako Lako	Copenhagen, Denmark	7	Best drummer
2008	Crossed Keys	Los Angeles, USA	8	
2008	The King Size	Treviso, Italy	9	
2008	Namaste	Paris, France	10	
2008	The Ran	Helsinki, Finland	11	
2008	Tash	Stuttgart, Germany	12	
2008	Die Fischer	Munich, Germany	13	
2008	Drowning Fate	Frankfurt, Germany	14	2nd-best drummer
2008	Aerial View	Nancy, France	15	
2008	PXR	Budapest, Hungary	16	
2008	Katarsick	Barcelona, Spain	17	
2008	Dizastro	Chicago, USA	18	

=== 2007 ===
Year	Finalist Band	City/Country	Place	Prize
2007	Fire Flies	New York, USA	1	Winning band, best drummer
2007	The New Hotness	Los Angeles, USA	2	2nd band
2007	Für Kerstins Letzte	Munich, Germany	3	3rd band
2007	La Tête Ailleurs	Paris, France	4	
2007	McGoozer	London, UK	5	Best singer
2007	Park Avenue	Milan, Italy	6	Best guitar player
2007	The 101's	Tilburg, Netherlands	7	2nd-best drummer
2007	Monorev	Bern, Switzerland	8	
2007	Thalamus	Stockholm, Sweden	9	Best bass player
2007	Sunset Drivers	Montreal, Canada	10	Mentioned guitar player, mentioned bass player
2007	The Jerks	Stuttgart, Germany	11	
2007	Furykane	Paris, France	12	
2007	Metro Vox	Chicago, USA	13	
2007	Mirramaze	Oslo, Norway	14	
2007	No One Cares	Barcelona, Spain	15	
2007	4th Street Traffic	London, UK	16	
2007	Stillroom	Dublin, Ireland	17	

=== 2006 ===
Year	Finalist Band	City/Country	Place	Prize
2006	The Sessions	Vancouver, Canada	1	Winning band
2006	The New Brand	Copenhagen, Denmark	2	2nd band, best original song, 2nd-mentioned drummer
2006	My Baby Wants to Eat Your Pussy	Munich, Germany	3	3rd-best band, best drummer, best singer, 2nd-best bass player, best rhythm, best electric-guitar player
2006	Berto Ramon	Chicago, USA	4	Best visual & sound performance
2006	Concubine	Tilburg, Netherlands	5	Mentioned drummer
2006	Sujeto K	Valencia, Spain	6	Mentioned bass player, 2nd-mentioned guitar player
2006	The Echoes	Dallas, USA	7	
2006	Verse of Trek	Bordeaux, France	8	
2006	Son	Cologne, Germany	9	
2006	Humano	Granada, Spain	10	
2006	Bawdy Festival	Paris, France	11	
2006	The Greed	Stockholm, Sweden	12	Best rhythm guitar, 2nd-best drummer, best guitar arrangements, mentioned guitar player
2006	Cabiria	Milan, Italy	13	
2006	Captain Cutthroat	Boston, USA	14	2nd-best drummer
2006	Lament	Leipzig, Germany	15	Best acoustic-guitar player
2006	Dear Catastrophe	Dublin, Ireland	16	
2006	Daily Blowjob	Florence, Italy	17	
2006	Ill System	London, UK	18	
2006	Vile Conundrum	San Francisco, USA	19	Best bass player
2006	Kid at the Back	London, UK	20	
2006	Flashmob	Basel, Switzerland	21	
2006	Hellrazor	Vancouver, Canada	22	

=== 2005 ===
Year	Finalist Band	City/Country	Place	Prize
2005	Rock Hard Power Spray	Århus, Denmark	1	Winning band, best electric-guitar player
2005	Natives of the New Dawn	Detroit, USA	2	2nd band, best singer, best performance, best guitar arrangements
2005	LIK...ID	Paris, France	3	
2005	Echovalve	Chicago, USA	4	Best bass player
2005	Kimono	Berlin, Germany	5	
2005	Indra	Manchester, UK	6	Best drummer
2005	Pummel	Edinburgh, UK	7	
2005	The Naives	Madrid, Spain	8	Best original song
2005	Band Called Pharisee	Chicago, USA	9	
2005	Sixteenth Solid Spread	Barcelona, Spain	10	Best rhythm guitar
2005	Stonefield	Cologne, Germany	11	
2005	The Perfect Guardaroba	Ancona, Italy	12	
2005	Blush	Basel, Switzerland	13	Best acoustic-guitar player
2005	Seven Stories	Montreal, Canada	14	
2005	Ska'n'Ska	Stockholm, Sweden	15	
2005	Kill the Nice Guy	Florence, Italy	16	
2005	Lazuright	Lindau, Germany	17	
2005	Fast Friday	Luxembourg, Luxembourg	18	
2005	Hindoslem	Vienna, Austria	19	Best bass player
2005	Chugga-Chugga	Paris, France	20	

=== 2004 ===
Finalist Band	City/Country	Place	Prize
Mr Brown	Hamburg, Germany	1	Winning band
Lexxi	Glasgow, UK	2	2nd band
Les Breauvachons	Paris, France	3	Best acoustic-guitar player, best visual & sound performance
Fluttr	Boston, USA	4	
Pete Möss	Montreal, Canada	5	Best rhythm-guitar player, best singer
Idioterne	Madrid, Spain	6	Best drummer
Glasshouse	Philadelphia, UK	7	
Einshoch6	Munich, Germany	8	
Lost Property Office	Rome, Italy	9	
Mellophone	Århus, Denmark	10	Best original song
Running Against Radar	Toronto, Canada	11	
Granvista	Gothenburg, Sweden	12	
Addicted	Milan, Italy	13	
Fevertree	Bournemouth, UK	14	Best guitar player
Ego	Barcelona, Spain	15	Best bass player, best keyboard player
Alta Pressione	Florence, Italy	16	
Mē Sages	Paris, France	17	
Pretty Overdosed	Vienna, Austria	18	Best drummer
Elfish	Zurich, Switzerland	19	Best bass player
Klartext	Berlin, Germany	20	

=== 2003 ===
Finalist Band	City/Country	Place	Prize
Nervous Nellie	Stockholm, Sweden	1	Winning band
Dead by Chocolate	Bologna, Italy	2	2nd band, second-best guitar
La Suite Mosquito	Barcelona, Spain	3	
No Radical Change	Florence, Italy	4	Third-best drummer
Muff	Hannover, Germany	5	
Sirupop	Vienna, Austria	6	
Slave to the Squarewave	Toronto, Canada	7	Second-best guitar
Toupé	Southampton, UK	8	Best bass, second-best drummer, best show, best arrangements
Klem	Paris, France	9	Best drummer
Sutrapumo	Copenhagen, Denmark	10	
Elikan Dew	Berlin, Germany	11	
Inborn	Luxembourg, Luxembourg	12	
Revoc On	Milan, Italy	13	
Jove	London, UK	14	Best singer
Bist	Munich, Germany	15	Best bess player, best keyboard player
Inertia	Rome, Italy	16	
Broken Pictures	Montreal, Canada	17	
Flangers	Montpellier, France	18	
BSK	Zurich, Switzerland	19	
Duke	Bordeaux, France	20	Best guitar, second-best bass
Crave	Madrid, Spain	21	
Sleeping Sun	Ruhrgebiet, Germany	22	Second-best guitar
Toadstool	Genoa, Italy	23	
Mahout Operator	Frankfurt, Germany	24	
Adrenalin	Cologne, Germany	25	
Maechtig	Hamburg, Germany	26	

=== 2002 ===
Finalist Band	City/Country	Place	Prize
Munshy	Paris, France	1	Winning band, best guitar, best drummer, best singer, best live show
Kerosin	Berlin, Germany	2	2nd band, 3rd-best drummer
Stone Park	Stockholm, Sweden	3	2nd-best drummer, best original song
Direct Line	Montreal, Canada	4	Third-best drummer
Orange Marmalade	Zurich, Switzerland	5	
Ners	Bologna, Italy	6	
Uncle Rock	London, UK	7	Second-best guitar
The Grand	Copenhagen, Denmark	8	
Verdrengungskuntler	Hamburg, Germany	9	
Jay Kod	Brussels, Belgium	10	Best bass
Itchy Poopzkid	Mannheim, Germany	11	
Desert Rain	Dortmund, Germany	12	

=== 2001 ===
Finalist Band	City/Country	Place	Prize
Willowtree	Stockholm, Sweden	1	Winning band
Sincere	Brussels, Belgium	2	2nd band
Morris	Copenhagen, Denmark	3	Best song
Sore!	Hamburg, Germany	4	Best guitar
Mindjuice	Munich, Germany	5	Best guitar
Athenais	Montpellier, France	6	Best singer
Pimate Pookie	Hannover, Germany	7	Best show
Thaibnakkel	Frankfurt, Germany	8	Best bassist
Deadline	Munich, Germany	9	
Tiger Fernandez	Luxembourg, Luxembourg	10	
13 Ampsun	London, UK	11	
Big-Tingsagwan	Paris, France	12	Best drummer
Free Fall	Dortmund, Germany	13	Best bassist
330 Mle	Vienna, Austria	14	
Zero Tre	Florence, Italy	15	
Rearview	Cologne, Germany	16	
Frozen Peas	Zurich, Switzerland	17	
Introdusco	Milan, Italy	18	
Variety	Karlsruhe, Germany	19	Best bassist
Drew	Rome, Italy	20	

=== 2000 ===
Finalist Band	City/Country	Place	Prize
Altzheima	Karlsruhe, Germany	—	
Zen	Rome, Italy	—	
Big Bang	Paris, France	—	
L.D.C.	Luxembourg, Luxembourg	—	
The Oujia Problem	London, UK	—	

No places were awarded this year.
