= Jang Hye-jin (singer) =

South Korean singer (born 1965)

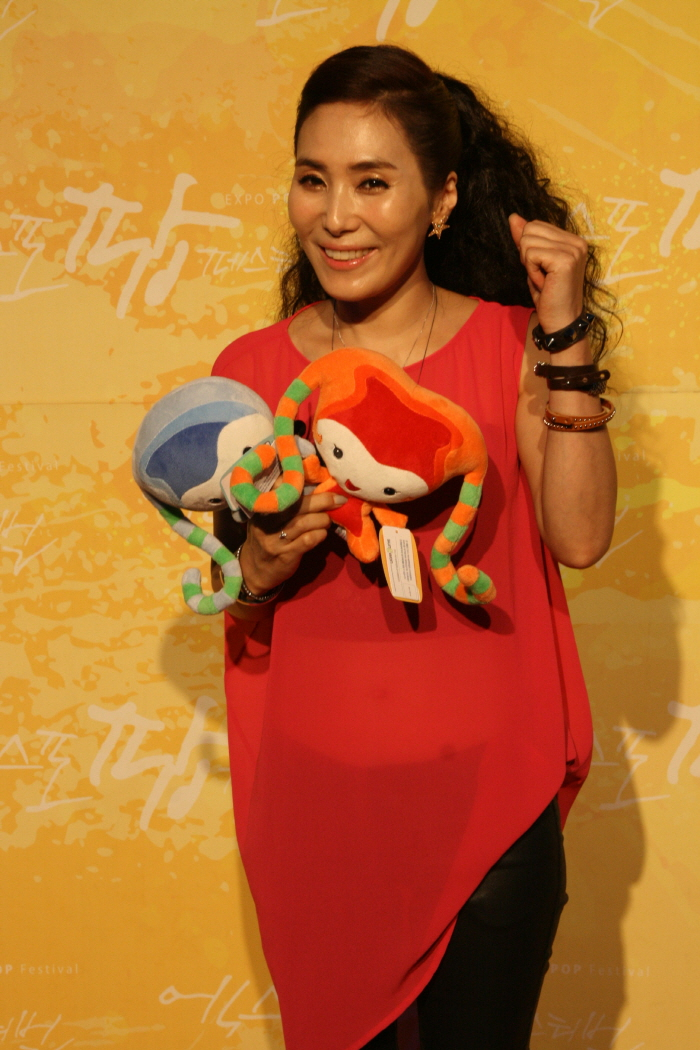
- Born: Lee Nam-mi; 15 May 1965 (age 61); South Korea
- Occupation: Singer
- Musical career
- Genres: Pop; R&B; Ballad
- Instrument: Vocals
- Years active: 1987–present
- Labels: Jellyfish Entertainment (2017–present); CAN Entertainment (2016–2017); Baljunso (2015–2016)
- Website: Jang HyeJin

Korean name
- Hangul: 이남미
- RR: I Nammi
- MR: I Nammi

Stage name
- Hangul: 장혜진
- RR: Jang Hyejin
- MR: Chang Hyejin

Lee Nam-mi (Korean: 이남미; born 15 May 1965) known professionally as Jang Hye-jin (장혜진) is a South Korean singer.

== Discography ==
=== Album ===
- 1991: 1st album "In My Dreams Always" (꿈속에선 언제나)
- 1992: 2nd album "White"
- 1994: 3rd album "Before The Party"
- 1996: 4th album "Temptation"
- 1998: 5th album "Dream"
- 2001: 6th album & Best Album "It's My Life"
- 2006: 7th album "4 Season Story"

=== Single ===
- 2015: 오래된 사진
- 2015: Ordinary 0325
- 2015: Ordinary 0508
- 2015: Ordinary 0710
- 2015: Ordinary 0817

=== OST ===
- 2002: Glass Slippers OST – For Your Love
- 2005: My Rosy Life OST – Rosy Life
- 2006: One Fine Day OST – Tears Falling
- 2007: White Tower OST – Body Temperature
- 2008: Between Dog and Wolf OST – Hidden Sky
- 2009: Cain and Abel OST – Painful Breakup (Sad Theme)
- 2010: Bad Guy OST – Don't Laugh, Don't Cry (ft 4MEN)
- 2010: Jejoongwon OST – That's Life
- 2011: Royal Family OST – Tears
- 2011: Man of Honor l OST – It's Because of Love
- 2012: Faith OST – Bad Guy
- 2012: Rascal Sons OST – One
- 2020 When My Love Blooms OST - The Season Like You

== Filmography ==
=== Television series ===
- 2011: I Am a Singer
- 2012: Top Band
- 2015: King of Masked Singer
- 2016: Fantastic Duo (Episode 5 & 6)
- 2016: Duet Song Festival (Episode 19)

== Awards ==
Award	Year	Category	Nominee/Nominated work	Result	Ref.
Gaon Chart Music Awards	2019	Artist of the Year – Digital Music (June)	"Drunk on Love" (with Yoon Min-soo)	Won	
Korea Entertainment Arts Awards	2011	Ballad Award	Jang Hye-jin	Won	
