= Walking After U =

South Korean rock band

Walking After U 워킹 애프터 유
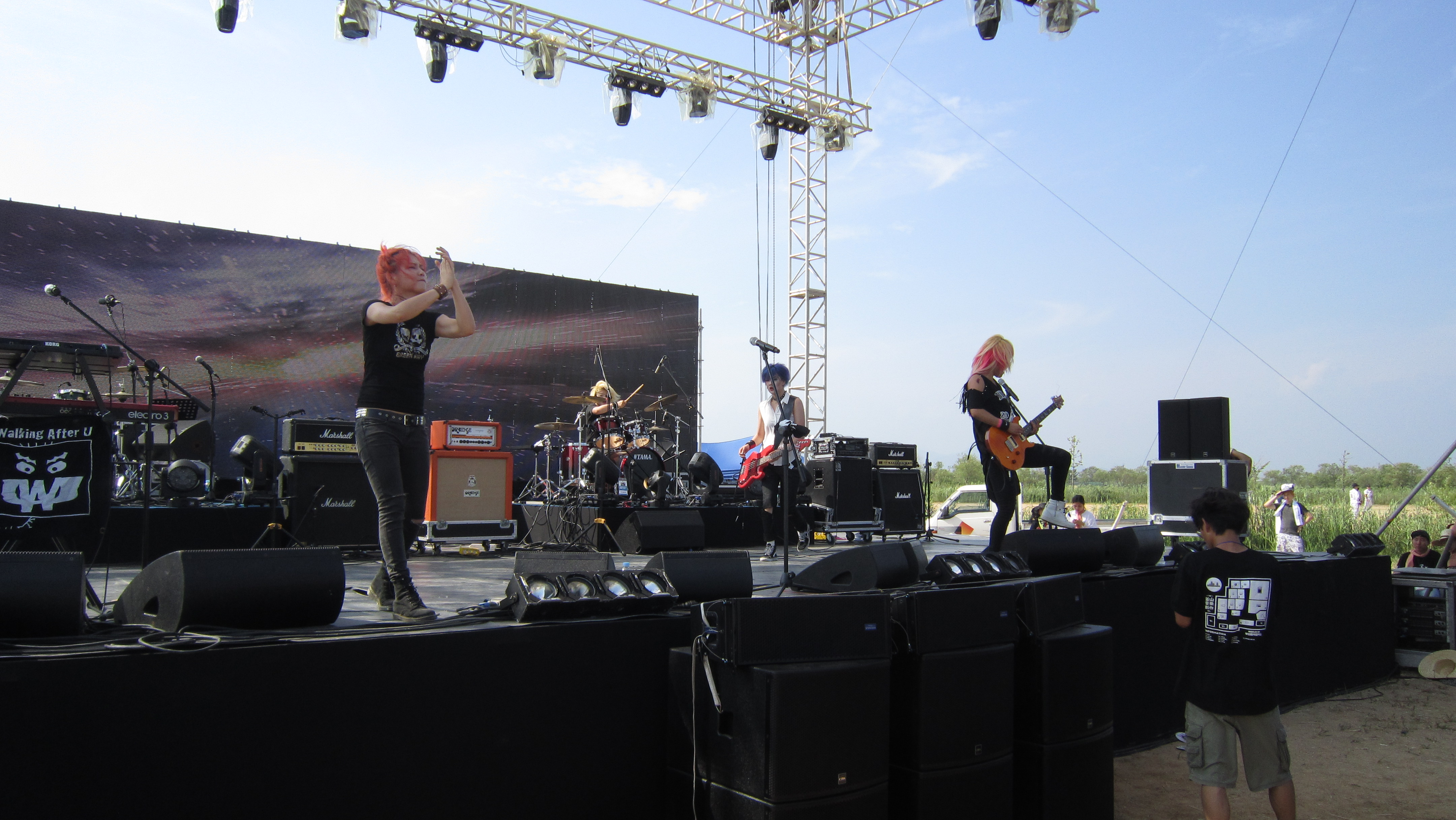
- Walking After U in Busan Rock Festival on 8 August 2015

Background information
- Also known as: WAU
- Origin: Seoul, South Korea
- Genres: emo rock, indie rock, modern rock
- Years active: 2014–present
- Labels: LODIS Company Co., Ltd
- Spinoff of: Rubber Duckie, Swingz
- Members: Haein, A-zzang, Hangyum
- Past members: Baemi, Song Jia, Minyeong, Sunny

Walking After U (Korean: 워킹애프터유) is a South Korean female rock band based in Seoul, South Korea. It was formed in 2014 as a merger of Rubber Duckie and Swingz.

== Members ==
=== Current ===
- Baek Haein 백해인 (lead vocals, guitar)
- Seo Ahyeon "A-zzang" 서아현 (drums, backup vocals)
- Jo Hangyum 조한겸 (bass)

=== Former member ===
- Bae Mihye "Baemi" 배미헤 (bass, backup vocals)
- Song Jia 송지아 (guitar, backup vocals)
- Cho Minyeong 조민영 (bass, backup vocals)
- Kim Seonghee "Sunny" 김성희 (keyboard, backup vocals)

== History ==
The band is a merger originating from a collaboration at the Girls' Rock Festival Season 6 between Rubber Duckie and Swingz. Rubber Duckie was led by technical guitarist Jia starting in the early 2000s, along with (then) drummer Sunny. Rubber Duckie had attained much recognition as a strong female rock group, and had released two singles and a full album. Swings was led by vocal and bassist Haein, along with drummer A-zzang. Swings received much critical acclaim and mainstream popularity when proceeding through several elimination rounds on 'Top Band - Season 2'. Both Rubber Duckie and Swings were featured in episode "Breaking Down Our Prejudice" of Arirang TV's program "Rock on Korea" in July 2013.

After the Girls' Rock Festival, and much discussion by management of both bands, an agreement was reached to draw talent and form a single new band. Walking After U drew from both bands' previous work, taking strengths and finding a new style. Many songs in the current repertoire still come from one of the previous bands' catalogs.

In 2017, Walking After U represented South Korea at the Emergenza World Band Competition after they won the national round at Hongdae V-Hall in Seoul.

Walking After U competed in Mnet's band competition Great Seoul Invasion in 2022, in which they performed their song You in the first round with positive reaction from the other competing bands, but weren't chosen by any of the team leaders. They however scored high in the band pool system and were then chosen by judges No Min-woo and N.Flying's Jaehyun and Hun. In the second round of the competition, they performed an arrangement of DNA by BTS as part of a mini mission and were praised for their interpretation of the song by the judges, but did not advance to the next round.

== Touring ==
After releasing their debut album in 2014, Walking After U toured South Korea extensively. Playing in clubs, bars, coffee shops, and concert venues, the band focused on building a wide fanbase. Following their Korean tour, they also performed in other East Asian countries, including a club tour in Tokyo. They also toured in South Korea after they released their albums Running Wild (2016) and Arirang (2018).

In 2023, they performed across South Korea as part of their tour The most important thing is not to lose your mind. With more than 40 performances, the tour lasted from April to September.

== Discography ==
=== Compilation albums ===
- Different Color #blue (2022)
- Walking After U (2023)

=== Extended plays ===
- Unleash (2014)
- Running Wild (2016)
- Arirang (2018)
- Six of Swords (2020)
- Are We Ready? (2021)
- Annyeong (2022)
