= Play the Siren =

South Korean hip hop group

- Origin: Seoul, South Korea
- Genre: Hip hop
- Years active: 2014–15
- Label: Baljunso
- Past members: Kasper; Squalla; Chi Chi; CJ; Siren; Beckbum
- Website: baljunso1991.co.kr

Play the Siren (Korean: 플레이 더 사이렌, also stylized as PLAY THE SIREN) was a South Korean hip-hop group that debuted in 2014 with the single "Dream Drive".

== History ==
=== Pre-debut ===
Play the Siren as a hip-hop crew brought the genre of urban music to Korea by combining electronic music and hardcore rap. They made a mix tape on Baljunso's official Youtube channel and one of the members, Kasper as a solo artist did the same thing on her Youtube channel.

=== 2014: Debut with Dream Drive and "Cypher" ===
SM Entertainment acquired Baljunso in 2014. The two companies launched a showcase titled Baljunso World Wide Promotion in Hongdae on March 8 and it featured performances including HLIN, Love and Peace, and 015B's Jang Ho Il project band. Following the announcement, SM Entertainment assisted to debut Play the Siren in the music industry with their single album, Dream Drive in July.

On July 17, they released a teaser which featured Luna of f(x). She participated in their song and music video. The song is addictive and powerful EDM sound with R&B genre, while the group's focus is hip hop and R&B, they work to combine different. On July 21, the music video has released on Baljunso and SM Entertainment official YouTube, and debut on Music Bank.

On 23 July, the song "Cypher" was released, making it their first comeback and their first full rap song.

=== 2015: Green Light, "I'll Be There" and split ===
A teaser for their upcoming comeback Green Light was uploaded to YouTube on April 19, 2015, eight days prior to the official release. This time, there were only three members: Kasper, Siren and Beckbum. On July 16, a comeback was released but only starred member Siren, supposing that either it was his solo debut or that he's the only remaining member of Play the Siren. The song "I'll Be There" featured singer Miel from the girl group Bay.b. With the departure of numerous members one by one—CJ, Squalla, ChiChi and ultimately Kasper—Play the Siren split up in August 2015.

== Former members ==
- Squalla (Park Jun-woo; 박준우)
- Chi Chi (Kim Chae-won; 김채원)
- Kasper (Ellen Serine Lee)
- Siren (Lee Man-sung; 이만성)
- Beckbum (Jung Baek-beom; 정백범)
- CJ (씨제이, 말빈)

== Discography ==
=== Single albums ===
Album information	Tracklist
Dream Drive: Released: July 21, 2014; Length: 11:36; Language: Korean; Label: Baljunso KT Music	1. "Dream Drive (Trap ver.)" (feat. Bay.B); 2. "Dream Drive (Piano ver.)" (feat. Monday Kiz); 3. "Dream Drive" (feat. Luna of f(x))
Green Light: Released: April 28, 2015; Length: Language: Korean; Label: Baljunso KT Music	

== Filmography ==
=== Music videos ===
Year	Title	Duration	Video
2014	"Dream Drive"	4:09	"Dream Drive (feat. Luna of f(x))" MV
2014	"Cypher"	3:47	"Cypher" MV
2015	"Green Light"	3:11	"Green Light" MV
2015	"I'll Be There"	3:27	"I'll be there" MV
