= Rubber Duckie (band) =

South Korean all-female indie rock band

Rubber Duckie 러버더키
- Origin: Bucheon, South Korea
- Genres: Indie rock, modern rock
- Years active: 2010–present
- Members: Jia, Sunny (2011-)
- Past members: Baemi (-2013), Baeky (-2010)

Rubber Duckie is South Korean all-female indie rock band. The band was formed originally in 2004 in Bucheon, but went on hiatus a year later. The band returned to perform in Hongdae, Seoul in late 2009. They were featured on Arirang Radio's program "Music180 - Musician Search" in July 2010 and in the episode "Breaking Down Our Prejudice" of Arirang TV's program "Rock on Korea" in July 2013. In June 2013 Rubber Duckie collaborated on stage with another all-female indie rock band Swingz and formed project group "Walking After U".

== Members ==
=== Current ===
- Jia (guitar, vocals, leader)
- Sunny (drums, vocals)

=== Former ===
- Baemi (bass guitar, vocals)
- Baeky (drums, vocals)

== Discography ==
=== Singles ===
- I Am A Single, February 2010
- 고맙다 수원, September 2010
- Come on, March 2013

=== Albums ===
- 미운오리 이야기, August 2011
