= Vrose =

South Korean rock band

Vincent & Roses 빈센트앤로즈
- Origin: Seoul, South Korea
- Genres: K-rock; Indie rock Modern rock
- Years active: 2009 - present
- Label: None
- Members: Lee Hyun-jae; Ryu Eun-ho; Lim Jong-ho; Lee Hyuhng-gu; Lim Jae-young

Vincent & Roses (Korean: 빈센트앤로즈) is a South Korean rock band. Formed in 2009, with Vincent (Lee Hyun-jae) on vocals and rhythm guitar; Ryu (Ryu Eun-ho) on lead guitar; Odin (Lim Jong-ho) on bass; Alan (Han Joo-soo) on keys; and S (Gwak Jung-hoon) on drums.
The band's name is derived from the members' names: Vincent and the initial of each member's alias.
The band initially planned to start out with an electronica-based sound, but later altered this and now have a combination of rock and roll, jazz, classic, and modern rock.

== History ==
VROSEs was formed in 2009 by leader and vocalist Vincent. They began playing at live clubs around Hongik University, such as Sapiens7, FB, and later at Abbey Road, located near Korea University.
Vincent & Roses started out as a five-man band; with Vincent (vocal, rhythm guitar), Ryu (lead guitar), Odin (bass), S (drums) and Alan (keyboard). Sometime in June 2009, drummer S left the band and was replaced with Raccoon. In mid-August 2009, Alan, for personal reasons, left the band.
They were nominated first place at the Dongducheon Rock Festival (Gyeongi Province, South Korea) on August 15, 2009, and second place at Jecheon International Music and Film Festival, later the same day.

== Members ==
Current members

- Vincent (Lee Hyun-jae) – lead vocals, (February 2009 – present)
- Ryu (Ryu Eun-ho) – lead guitars, (February–June 2009, August 2009 – present )
- Odin (Lim Jong-ho) – bass, backup vocals (February 2009 – present)
- Su-zi (Lee Hyung-gu) – rhythm guitar, (July 2009 – present)
- Raccoon (Lim Jae-young) – drums (June 2009 – present)

Former members

- S (Gwak Jung-hoon) – drums (February~June 2009)
- Alan (Han Joo-soo) – keyboard (February~August 2009)

== Other websites ==
- Official Site(Korean)
