= Baljunso =

South Korea indie label founded in 1991

- Parent company: SM Entertainment
- Founded: 1991; 34 years ago
- Founder: Kang Byung-yong
- Genre: Korean indie; Korean hip hop; rock
- Country of origin: South Korea
- Location: Seoul
- Official website: baljunso1991.co.kr (Archived)

Baljunso (Korean: 발전소; stylized in all caps) is a South Korean indie label founded in 1991 by Kang Byung-yong, former director of CAN Entertainment. Baljunso was acquired by SM Entertainment in 2014.

== History ==
Baljunso, an indie label, was established in 1991 by Kang Byung-yong, the former CEO of Can Entertainment, who discovered many artists such as Kim Jong-seo, Jang Hye-jin, Park Sang-min, and Can. Kang stated that the establishment of the record label is to revive hip-hop and band music associated with non-mainstream music genres rather than the idol music form that has been the foundation of influential K-pop. SM Entertainment invested in the label to emphasize the variety of K-pop and globalize the industry. It then became an affiliate label of SM establishing local and international distribution, marketing, and further businesses for the company. On February 26, 2014, SM announced that the label would hold a launching ceremony called Baljunso World Wide Promotion on March 8 at Mapo District, Seoul, and will be broadcast live through SM Town's official YouTube channel, Genie, and Ustream. The label announced that they would debut Play the Siren, an urban music group that plays diverse genres of music based on rap. On January 21, 2015, Baljunso reported that Jang Hye-jin signed a contract with the label and planned a new song to be released on January 26.

== Artists ==
All names listed are adapted from Baljunso's artist page on its official website.

- HLIN
- Wasted Johnnys
- Sinchon Tigers

=== Former artists ===
- Play the Siren (2014–2015)
- Jang Hye-jin (2015–2016)
