= Swingz =

South Korean indie rock band

Swingz 스윙즈
- Origin: Daegu, South Korea
- Genres: Indie rock
- Years active: 2010–present
- Label: Limelight
- Members: A-hyun, Haein
- Past members: Misun

Swingz is South Korean indie rock duo originally formed as a trio in Daegu, South Korea. They were featured in episode "Breaking Down Our Prejudice" of Arirang TV's program "Rock on Korea" in July 2013. In June 2013 Swingz collaborated on stage with another all-female indie rock band Rubber Duckie and formed project group "Walking After U".

== Members ==
=== Current ===
- Haein (guitar, vocals)
- A-hyun (drums)

=== Former ===
- Misun (bass guitar, vocals)

== Discography ==
=== Albums ===
- Beginning Of Swingz, October 2011
- Renewal, September 2012
